= Poetry Ireland =

Irish organization for poets and poetry

Poetry Ireland (Irish: Éigse Éireann) is an organisation for poets and poetry, in both Irish and English, in the island of Ireland. It is a private nonprofit organisation that receives support from the Arts Council of Ireland and the Arts Council of Northern Ireland. It was founded in 1978 by John F. Deane and is based in Parnell Square, Dublin. Its thirtieth anniversary in 2008 was celebrated by events all over Ireland culminating in an event at the Irish College in Paris.

== Director ==
The current director is Liz Kelly. Her predecessors have included Niamh O'Donnell, Maureen Kennelly, who is now director of the Arts Council of Ireland, Joe Woods, Theo Dorgan and Rory Brennan.

== Board ==
- Ciarán Benson (Chairperson) Professor Emeritus of Psychology University College Dublin
- Olwen Dawe, policy analyst and consultant
- Peter Fallon, poet, editor and publisher
- Joan McBreen, poet
- Christine Monk, cultural publicist
- Joe Moreau, Managing Partner of Byrne Moreau Connell, Chartered Accountants and Registered Auditors
- Alan Moore, writer and poet
- Paul Muldoon, poet and winner of the Pulitzer Prize for Poetry and the T. S. Eliot Prize
- Jean O'Mahony, Head of Policy and Research in AIB's Corporate Affairs and Strategy Division
- Tristan Rosenstock, TV and radio presenter and musician
- Bill Shipsey, Barrister and the founder of Art for Amnesty

== Publications ==
Poetry Ireland publishes Poetry Ireland Review, a journal of Irish poetry, which is published quarterly and includes the work of both emerging and established Irish and international poets. It appoints a new editor every four issues.

Poetry Ireland's bimonthly newsletter Poetry Ireland News includes information on readings, competitions, festivals, opportunities, articles and essays.

Poetry Ireland has recently launched Trumpet, a literary pamphlet intended to be more accessible than the Review to the casual reader.

== Education ==
Poetry Ireland's Writers in Schools Scheme supports visits by writers to primary and post-primary schools throughout the Republic of Ireland. The program has been running for over thirty years. It has proved to be an enriching and informative scheme for both students and writers. In addition it organises a Poetry Aloud competition for school students speaking (reciting) poetry.

Poetry Ireland has cooperated with Schools Across Borders in a creative writing project.

Poetry Ireland is also involved in the Poets' Chair, a film archive of contemporary Irish poets who write in both English and Irish. The archive is a record of living Irish poets for future generations as well as an invaluable educational resource bringing poets and their work to life through film. It includes recordings of Seamus Heaney, Eavan Boland, Moya Cannon, Louis de Paor, Brendan Kennelly, John Montague, Eiléan Ní Chuilleanáin, Ciarán Carson, Michael Longley, Sinéad Morrissey, Cathal Ó Searcaigh, Gerald Dawe, Máire Mhac an tSaoi, Paul Muldoon and Dennis O'Driscoll.

== Readings ==
Poetry Ireland financially supports more than 120 poetry readings annually.

== Austin Clarke collection ==
Poetry Ireland has transferred a collection of books consisting of the library of Austin Clarke and books formerly owned by the poets John Jordan and Tanya Touwen to the Special Collections at the University College Dublin Library. The collection of 5,000 books were once mainly the property of Austin Clarke. Poetry Ireland also transferred a collection of its papers there.

== Information and resource service ==
Poetry Ireland provides information and resources for both new and established poets, as possible. This includes everything from assessments and writers workshops to readings, copyright and general literary advice.

== Readings ==
Poetry Ireland provides support for readings by poets. Its website provides details on readings and events in Ireland.
