= Icarus (magazine) =

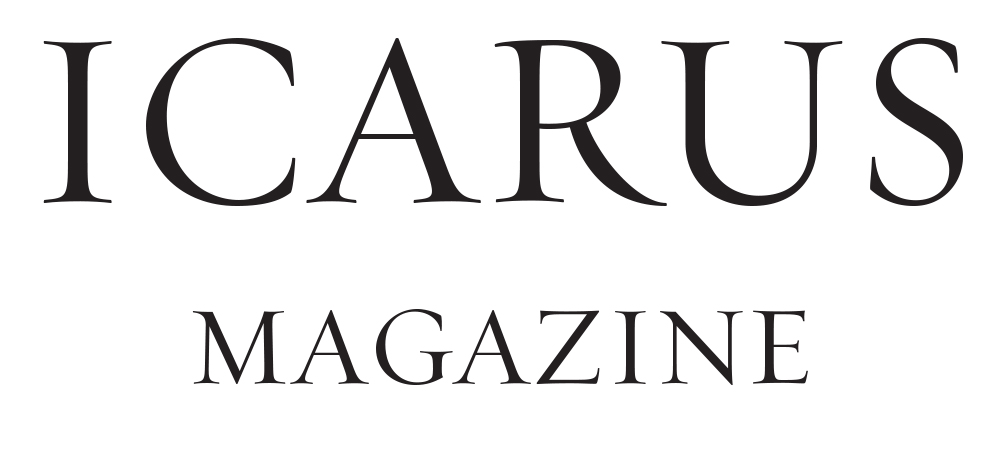
- Editor: Gwenhwyfar Ferch Rhys, Eileen Grant (2025/26)
- Frequency: 2-3 issues per academic year
- Founder: Alec Reid
- Founded: 1950
- Country: Ireland
- Based in: Dublin
- Language: English
- Website: icarusmagazine.com

Icarus is a student literary magazine based in Trinity College Dublin, publishing work by students, alumni and staff of the university. The magazine is the earliest-founded arts publication still extant in Ireland.

The current editors are Gwenhwyfar Ferch Rhys and Eileen Grant.

== History and profile ==
Icarus was founded in 1950 by Alec Reid, and has been published with regularity at least twice a year ever since. The magazine focuses on creative writing and publishes poems, prose and drama written by students, staff and alumni of Trinity College.

Former editors include Rudi Holzapfel, Brendan Kennelly, Derek Mahon, Michael Longley, Iain Sinclair, David Norris, John Haffenden, Maurice Scully, Sebastian Barry, Eiléan Ní Chuilleanáin, David Wheatley, Paul Nash, Selina Guinness, Sue Rainsford, Joanne O'Leary and Jonathan Creasy.

Notable contributors have included John Montague, Seamus Heaney, Paul Durcan, Louis MacNeice, Matthew Sweeney, E. A. Markham, Donald Davie, Dermot Bolger, John F. Deane, Thomas Kinsella, W. R. Rodgers, Frank O’Connor, Edward Lucie-Smith, Eavan Boland, Seamus Deane, Gerald Dawe, Caitriona O'Reilly, Sinéad Morrissey, Justin Quinn, Thom Gunn, Colm Tóibín, Vona Groarke, Brian Keenan, Eilis Ni Dhuibhne, Desmond Hogan, Monk Gibbon, Arland Ussher, Ciaran Carson, Kevin Barry, Cyrus Cassells, Simon Armitage, Lucy Caldwell, and Doireann Ní Ghríofa.
