= Poetry Ireland Review =

Irish poetry journal

- Frequency: Three times a year
- Publisher: Poetry Ireland
- Founded: 1948
- Country: Ireland
- Website: www.poetryireland.ie/publications/

Poetry Ireland Review is a journal of Irish poetry published three times a year by Poetry Ireland, the national Irish poetry organisation.

Poetry Ireland Review publishes the work of both emerging and established Irish and international poets. In line with keeping the journal fresh, vibrant and progressive it usually appoints a new editor for every four journals. An original Poetry Ireland journal appeared in April 1948, edited by David Marcus. It reappeared in Autumn 1962, published by Dolmen Press and edited by John Jordan with an editorial board of James Liddy, James J. McAuley and Richard Weber.

Poetry Ireland Review in its current format appeared in 1981, edited by John Jordan and is administrated by Poetry Ireland.

List of Poetry Ireland Review Editors
John Jordan	1–8
Thomas McCarthy	9–12
Conleth Ellis and Rita E. Kelly	13
Terence Brown	14–17
Ciarán Cosgrove	18–19
Dennis O'Driscoll	20–21
John Ennis and Rory Brennan	22–23
John Ennis	24–25
Micheal O'Siadhail	26–29
Máire Mhac an tSaoi	30–33
Peter Denman	34–37
Pat Boran	38
Seán Ó Cearnaigh	39
Pat Boran	40–42
Chris Agee	43–44
Moya Cannon	45–48
Liam Ó Muirthile	49
Michael Longley	50
Liam Ó Muirthile	51–52
Frank Ormsby	53–56
Catherine Phil Mac Carthy	57–60
Mark Roper	61–64
Biddy Jenkinson	65–68
Maurice Harmon	69–72
Eva Bourke	76
Peter Sirr	77–91
Eiléan Ní Chuilleanáin	92–95
Caitríona O'Reilly	96–99
Paul Muldoon	100
Caitríona O'Reilly	101–104
John F. Deane	105–112
Vona Groarke	113–120
Eavan Boland	121–129
Colette Bryce	130–

== See also ==
- List of literary magazines

== Further information ==
- ‘The Reception of Contemporary Scottish Poetry in Ireland: The Case of Poetry Ireland Review’, by Val Nolan, in The Enclave of My Nation: Cross-currents in Irish and Scottish Studies, eds. Shane Alcobia-Murphy and Margret Maxwell (Aberdeen: AHRC Centre for Irish and Scottish Studies, 2008). ISBN 978-1-906108-03-8
