= Edward O'Dwyer =

Edward O'Dwyer may refer to:

- Edward O'Dwyer (bishop)
- Edward O'Dwyer (poet)
- Edward F. O'Dwyer, American judge
