= Poetry Now Award =

Annual Irish literary prize

- Awarded for: Best Irish poetry collection
- Location: Dún Laoghaire
- Country: Ireland
- Presented by: The Irish Times
- Hosted by: Mountains to Sea dlr Book Festival
- Reward: €2,000 (originally €5,000)
- First award: 2005
- Final award: 2020
- Website: www.poetrynow.ie

The Poetry Now Award was an annual literary prize presented for the best single volume of poetry by an Irish poet. The €5,000 award was first given in 2005 (reduced to €2,500 in 2013) and presented during annual Dún Laoghaire–Rathdown poetry festivals. From 2005 to 2011, it was bestowed during the Poetry Now international poetry festival (the latter event was inaugurated in 1996) which was held in March or April each year. In 2012 and 2013, the award was given during the Mountains to Sea dlr Book Festival, in September ("dlr" stands for "Dún Laoghaire–Rathdown"). As of 2020, The Irish Times newspaper was the sponsor of the award. In 2020, the Mountains to Sea dlr Book Festival was cancelled due to the restrictions relating to COVID-19.

== History ==
=== 2019 ===
Winner: Eileán Ní Chuilleanáin, for The Mother House

=== 2018 ===
Winner: Leontia Flynn, for The Radio

Shortlist:

- Tara Bergin, The Tragic Death of Eleanor Marx
- Leontia Flynn, The Radio
- Conor O'Callaghan, Live Streaming
- Mark Roper, Bindweed
- David Wheatley, The President of Planet Earth

Judges:

- Fran Brearton, John McAuliffe and Gerard Smyth

=== 2017 ===
Winner: Paddy Bushe, for On A Turning Wing

=== 2016 ===
Winner: Caitríona O’Reilly, for Geis

=== 2015 ===
Winner: Theo Dorgan, for Nine Bright Shiners

=== 2014 ===
Winner: Sinéad Morrissey, for Parallax

=== 2013 ===
Winner: Dennis O'Driscoll, for Dear Life, awarded posthumously (he died in December 2012).

Shortlist:

- Catherine Phil MacCarthy, The Invisible Threshold.
- Dennis O'Driscoll, Dear Life.
- Harry Clifton, The Winter Sleep of Captain Lemass.
- James Harpur, Angels and Harvesters.
- Mark Roper, A Gather of Shadow.

Judges: Mary O'Donnell (poet and novelist), Peter Sirr (writer, editor, translator, and former winner), and Ruth Webster (bookseller).

=== 2012 ===
Winner: Michael Longley, for A Hundred Doors.

Shortlist:

- Moya Cannon, Hands.
- Michael Longley, A Hundred Doors.
- John Montague, Speech Lessons.
- Bernard O'Donoghue, Farmers Cross.
- Macdara Woods, The Cotard Dimension.

Judges: Gerald Dawe, James Harpur, and Mary Shine Thompson (all poets).

=== 2011 ===
Winner: Seamus Heaney, for Human Chain.

Shortlist:

- Sara Berkeley, The View from Here.
- Ciarán Carson, Until Before After.
- Dermot Healy, A Fool's Errand.
- Seamus Heaney, Human Chain.
- Paul Muldoon, Maggot.

Judges: Brian Lynch (poet, novelist, and screenwriter), Leanne O'Sullivan (poet), and Borbála Faragó (lecturer and critic).

=== 2010 ===
Winner: Sinéad Morrissey, for Through the Square Window.

Shortlist:

- Ciarán Carson, On the Night Watch.
- Vona Groarke, Spindrift.
- Sinéad Morrissey, Through the Square Window.
- Eiléan Ní Chuilleanáin, The Sun-fish.
- Peter Sirr, The Thing Is.

Judges: John F. Deane, Alan Gillis, and Maria Johnston.

=== 2009 ===
Winner: Derek Mahon, for Life on Earth.

Shortlist:

- Colette Bryce, Self-Portrait in the Dark.
- Ciarán Carson, For All We Know.
- Leontia Flynn, Drives.
- Pearse Hutchinson, At Least For a While.
- Derek Mahon, Life on Earth.

Judges: Kit Fryatt, Sean O'Brien, and Joseph Woods.

=== 2008 ===
Winner: Harry Clifton, for Secular Eden: Paris Notebooks 1994–2004.

Shortlist:

- Harry Clifton, Secular Eden: Paris Notebooks 1994–2004.
- Eamon Grennan, Out of Breath.
- Dave Lordan, The Boy in the Ring.
- Dennis O'Driscoll, Reality Check.
- Matthew Sweeney, Black Moon.

Judges: Philip Coleman, Sasha Dugdale, and William Wall.

=== 2007 ===
Winner: Seamus Heaney, for District and Circle.

Shortlist:

- Seamus Heaney, District and Circle.
- Medbh McGuckian, The Currach Requires No Harbours.
- Paul Muldoon, Horse Latitudes.
- Caitriona O'Reilly, The Sea Cabinet.
- David Wheatley, Mocker.

Judges: Eileen Battersby, Niall MacMonagle, and Maurice Riordan.

=== 2006 ===
Winner: Derek Mahon, for Harbour Lights.

Shortlist:

- John F. Deane, The Instruments of Art.
- Nick Laird, To a Fault.
- Derek Mahon, Harbour Lights.
- Sinéad Morrissey, The State of the Prisons.
- Conor O'Callaghan, Fiction.

Judges: Patrick Crotty, Gerard Fanning, and Fiona Sampson.

=== 2005 ===
Winner: Dorothy Molloy, for Hare Soup, awarded posthumously (she died in January 2004) for her début collection.

Shortlist:

- Paul Durcan, The Art of Life.
- Alan Gillis, Somebody Somewhere.
- Medbh McGuckian, The Book of the Angel.
- Dorothy Molloy, Hare Soup.
- Peter Sirr, Nonetheless.

Judges: Simon Armitage, Selina Guinness, and Colm Tóibín.
