= Wake Forest University Press =

Non-profit publisher located in Wake forest University

- Parent company: Wake Forest University
- Founded: 1975
- Country of origin: United States
- Headquarters location: Winston-Salem, NC
- Publication types: Books
- Official website: wfupress.wfu.edu

Established in 1975, Wake Forest University Press is a non-profit literary publisher located in Winston-Salem, North Carolina, on the campus of Wake Forest University. Although small among university presses, it is a major publisher of Irish poetry in North America.

Wake Forest University Press is an affiliate of the Association of University Presses, and it is a member of the Community of Literary Magazines and Presses (CLMP).

Wake Forest Press publishes poets from the Republic of Ireland and from Northern Ireland. Poets published include Brendan Kennelly, Ciarán Carson, Austin Clarke, Harry Clifton, Denis Devlin, Peter Fallon, Leontia Flynn, Alan Gillis, Vona Groarke, Michael Hartnett, Thomas Kinsella, Michael Longley, Derek Mahon, Richard Murphy, Medbh McGuckian, Paula Meehan, John Montague, Paul Muldoon, Nuala Ní Dhomhnaill, Eiléan Ní Chuilleanáin, Caitríona O'Reilly, Conor O'Callaghan, and Peter Sirr. The Press also published The Donegal Pictures, a book of black-and-white photographs by photographer Rachel Geise (now Brown).

Other noteworthy publications include the anthologies, The Wake Forest Book of Irish Women's Poetry, 1967-2000, revised and expanded in 2011 and published as The Wake Forest Book of Irish Women's Poetry; The Wake Forest Series of Irish Poetry, volumes 1, 2, 3 and 4; and The New North, an anthology of contemporary Northern Irish poetry, funded by the National Endowment for the Arts (NEA) and selected and edited by Chris Agee.

For a number of years, Wake Forest University Press published a bilingual series of 20th-century French poetry, but that series is no longer active.

The Press began when Dillon Johnston, Irish scholar and professor of English, realized how few titles of contemporary Irish poetry were consistently available in the United States. Supported by the administration at Wake Forest, he established the press in 1975. Johnston retired from Wake Forest in 2003, but remains an advising editor.

Jefferson Holdridge, who received his doctorate at University College Dublin, is the press's director and editor. He is also Professor of English at Wake Forest University, specializing in Irish literature. Staff includes Advising Assistant Director Candide Jones, Manager Amanda Keith, and a workforce of student interns.

== See also ==
- List of English-language book publishing companies
- List of university presses
