= Vincent Buckley Poetry Prize =

The Vincent Buckley Poetry Prize is a biennial award that is offered alternately to enable an Australian poet to visit Ireland and to facilitate the visit of an Irish poet to Melbourne. It provides the recipient with a return airfare, a contribution towards living expenses and an honorary fellowship at the Australian Centre in the School of Historical and Philosophical Studies at the University of Melbourne.

The prize was established in 1992 to commemorate the life and work of Vincent Buckley by reflecting his "love of and commitment to both Australian and Irish poetry". Buckley was a poet, critic and Professor of English at the University of Melbourne and the prize was funded through donations from his family and friends.

== The Award ==
The award is made by a committee comprising the director of the Australian Centre, the head of the department of English at the University or the head's nominee, and a practising poet nominated by the dean of the faculty of Arts. Past committee members have included Chris Wallace-Crabbe and former recipient Cate Kennedy.

The first award was made in 1994 and the recipient was Lisa Gorton.

== Winners ==
- 2020: Susannah Dickey
- 2018: Joel Deane
- 2016: James Harpur
- 2014: Dan Disney
- 2012: Miriam Gamble
- 2010: Elizabeth Campbell
- 2008: David Wheatley
- 2006: Bronwyn Lea
- 2004: Mark Granier
- 2002: Cate Kennedy
- 2000: John Montague
- 1998: Aileen Kelly
- 1996: Enda Wyley
- 1994: Lisa Gorton
