= Judge O'Dwyer =

Judge O'Dwyer may refer to:

- William O'Dwyer (1890–1964), Kings County (Brooklyn) Court, New York judge before becoming Mayor of New York City
- Edward F. O'Dwyer (1860–1922), Chief Justice of the New York City court
