= The Weather in Japan =

2000 book of poetry by Michael Longley

- Author: Michael Longley
- Language: English
- Genre: Nature
- Publisher: Wake Forest University Press
- Publication date: 2000
- Pages: 80 pp (paperback)
- ISBN: 9780224060431

The Weather in Japan is a 2000 book of poetry composed by Irish poet Michael Longley and published by Wake Forest University Press in 2000. It won the Irish Times' Literature Prize for poetry, the Hawthornden Prize, and the T. S. Eliot Prize in 2000.

== Content ==
The Weather in Japan is a collection of poems dealing with the malicious battles of the United States pre-Civil War, WWI, and the Holocaust of WWII. He refers to the Odyssey many times in various poems throughout the book. Longley also refers to ancient warfare and its violent as well contemporary battlefields. By placing the soldiers and their hardships into the form of poetry, Longley commits the memory of these men forever to the attention of all who read and re-read this book of poetry. He brings to light the Irish killing their neighbors due to the conflict of the dominance of the British-Protestant over the Catholic-Irish. The longest poem in the collection describes the battlefields and cemeteries of WWI.

== Style ==
Poems in this collection vary widely in length and form and include single line poems as well as elegies and haiku, and various other formats. Many of the poems in this collection refer to images such as flowers and animals.

Longley's aesthetic is reminiscent of a Japanese, Zen-like attitude. Like his other poetry, The Weather in Japan contains short lyrical poems, with an image, observation, or personal reflection. Two of the most used motifs throughout the book are flowers and the patchwork quilt. Another tactic in his writing is to tie his family ancestors to literary ones he has been influenced by.

== Reception ==
According to Wesley McNair's review in the Colby Quarterly, this book of poetry strongly displays Longley's concern towards the cultural differences in his country—Ireland. In McNair's words, "For a writer who believes as Longley does in the value of multiculturalism in Irish society, the artist who creates by bringing together different resources is an important model, demonstrating in his work that by embracing diversity, new orders can be found."

In an article on Longley as a poet and the topic of war, Mümin Hakkioğlu says that Longley "has a great affinity and affection for his predecessors".
