= Jorge Fondebrider =

Argentine poet, critic, and translator

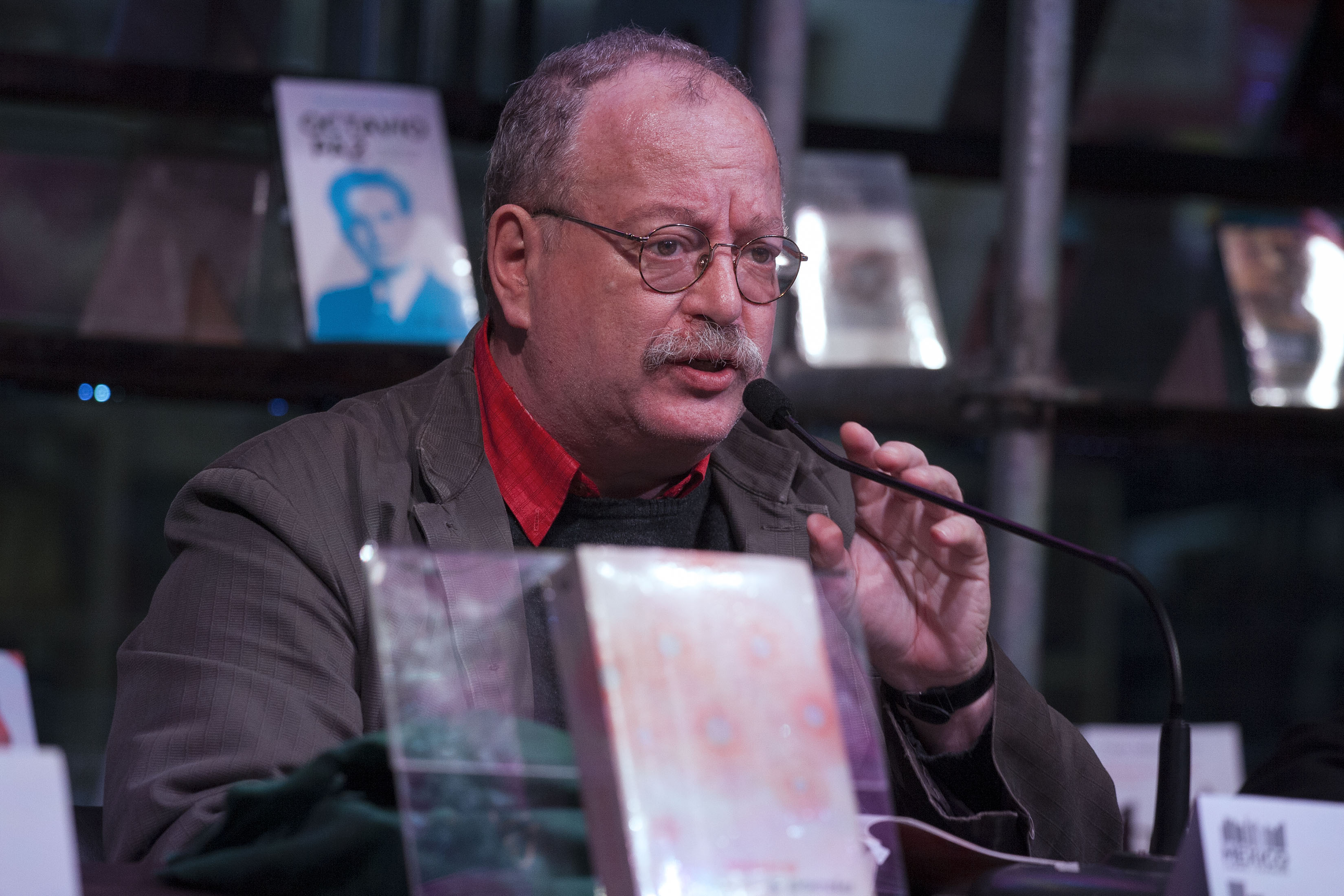
Jorge Fondebrider

Jorge Fondebrider (born in 1956 in Buenos Aires) is an Argentinian poet, critic and translator.

== Career and publications ==
=== Poetry books ===
His published poetry books are Elegías (1983), Imperio de la Luna (1987), Standards (1993), Los últimos tres años (2006), La extraña trayectoria de la luz. Poemas reunidos 1983–2013 (2016) and La suerte que nos toca (2022). Also, he has been translated into English (The Spaces Between, an anthology translated by Richard Gwyn-Meirion House, Glan yr afon, Wales, U.K., Cinnamon Press, 2013) and into Swedish (De tre senaste åren, translated by Martin Uggla - Malmö, Sweden, Siesta Förlag, 2015).

Jorge Fondebrider also published several books on cities and places as La Buenos Aires ajena (2000), a history of the city told by foreigners that visited it from 1536 to 2000; and Versiones de la Patagonia (2003), a history of Patagonia, a part of Argentina, told by confronting different versions of the same facts, La París de los argentinos (2010), a history of Argentinian emigration to France as well as a history of France told by Argentinian witnesses; and Dublín (2019) and Una traducción de París (2023), both a history and travelog of those cities. He has published too Licantropía. Historias de hombres lobos de Occidente (2004 and 2015, and under the new title Historias de los hombres lobos, 2015, 2016 and 2017), a history of werewolfism in the Western world through the ages until the present, and Los cuervos en la histria (2025), a study about the representations of ravens and crows on different cultures sin Prehistory to the present.

=== Anthologies and essays ===
He has edited four anthologies of Argentinian poetry and a number of critical essays on poetry and cultural matters. Among them are Conversaciones con la poesía argentina (1995), Tres décadas de poesía argentina (2006),Una antología de la poesía argentina. 1970-2008 (2008), Giannuzzi. Reseñas, artículos y trabajos académicos sobre su obra (2010), Otro río que pasa. Poesía argentina 1910-2010 (2010), Poésie récente d'Argentine. Une anthologie possible (2013), Cómo se ordena una biblioteca (2014), Cómo se empieza a narrar (2015) Poetas que traducen poesía (2015) and the collected works of César Fernández Moreno (1999) and Joaquín O. Giannuzzi (2009).

=== Translated French and English language literature and essay ===
He also translated many books of contemporary French poetry—Guillaume Apollinaire, Henri Deluy and Yves Di Manno, among others—in the huge anthology Poesía francesa contemporánea. 1940–1997, three volumes by Georges Perec, one by Canadian author Lori Saint-Martin, and annotated versions of Madame Bovary, Three Tales and Bouvard and Pécuchet by Gustave Flaubert, an anthology of short stories by Guy de Maupassant, and Heart of Darkness by Joseph Conrad, as well as Welsh and Scottish authors (among them Richard Gwyn, Patrick McGuinness, Owen Martell, and Tom Pow, respectively) and some Americans (Jack London, Patricia Highsmith, J.P. Donleavy). He is an active promoter of Culture of Ireland in Latin America and has introduced it to a wide range of Spanish-speaking authors, such as Anthony Cronin (Dead as Doornails), Maeve Brennan (The Rose Garden) Claire Keegan (Antarctica, Walk the Blue Fields, Foster,, Small Things Like These), Joseph O'Connor (Ghost Light), and Moya Cannon (two anthologies of her poetry). Together with Gerardo Gambolini, he chose and translated the texts from Poesía irlandesa contemporánea (1999), the first bilingual anthology of contemporary Irish poetry published in a Spanish-speaking country; also, a book on the Ulster cycle, a collection of Irish traditional short stories; a book on Anglo-Scottish ballads; and Peter Street & otros poemas (2008), by the Irish poet Peter Sirr.

== Club de Traductores Literarios de Buenos Aires ==
In 2009 he co-founded with Julia Benseñor the Club de Traductores Literarios de Buenos Aires (https://clubdetraductoresliterariosdebaires.blogspot.com/).
