= Nell Regan =

Poet and non fiction writer

- Born: 1969 (age 56–57); London
- Occupation: Poet
- Writing career
- Genre: Poetry

Nell Regan is an internationally renowned Irish based poet and non fiction writer.

== Life ==
Regan was born in London in 1969 but grew up in Dublin, Ireland. She was educated in University College Dublin, Lancaster University and Goldsmiths, University of London. She is a graduate of The Poets’ House, Donegal. Regan has worked as a documentary researcher. She teaches in Dublin. In 2013 Regan was made artistic director of the West Cork Literary Festival.

In 2011, she participated in the International Writing Program Fall Residency at the University of Iowa in Iowa City, IA.

== Awards ==
- 2007 Dublin City Council Bursary for Literature
- 2012 Fulbright Fellowship
- 2010 Arts Council An Chomhairle Ealaíon Literature Bursary
- in 2011 she was Writer in Residence at the International Writing Programme, Iowa
- In 2013 Writer in Residence at the Centre Culturel Irlandais, Paris.
- 2016 Kavanagh Fellowship
- She has also been shortlisted for the Glen Dimplex New Writing Awards, Strong Awards and Patrick Kavanagh Awards.

== Themes ==
Regan's poetry draws from the issues she is interested in, like history, culture and nature and she has been commissioned by organisations like Cork County Council's Fort Camden Commission.

== Bibliography ==
=== Poetry ===
- Preparing for Spring (Galway, Arlen House, 2007/New York, Syracuse University Press, 2008)
- Bound for Home (Arlen House, 2011)
- One Still Thing (London, Enitharmon, 2014)
- Underworld (Belfast, Lapwing, 2004)

=== Non fiction ===
- Female Activists, Irish Women and Change, (Woodfield Press, 2001)
- Field Day Anthology Vol 4.
