= John Jordan (poet) =

Irish poet and short-story writer

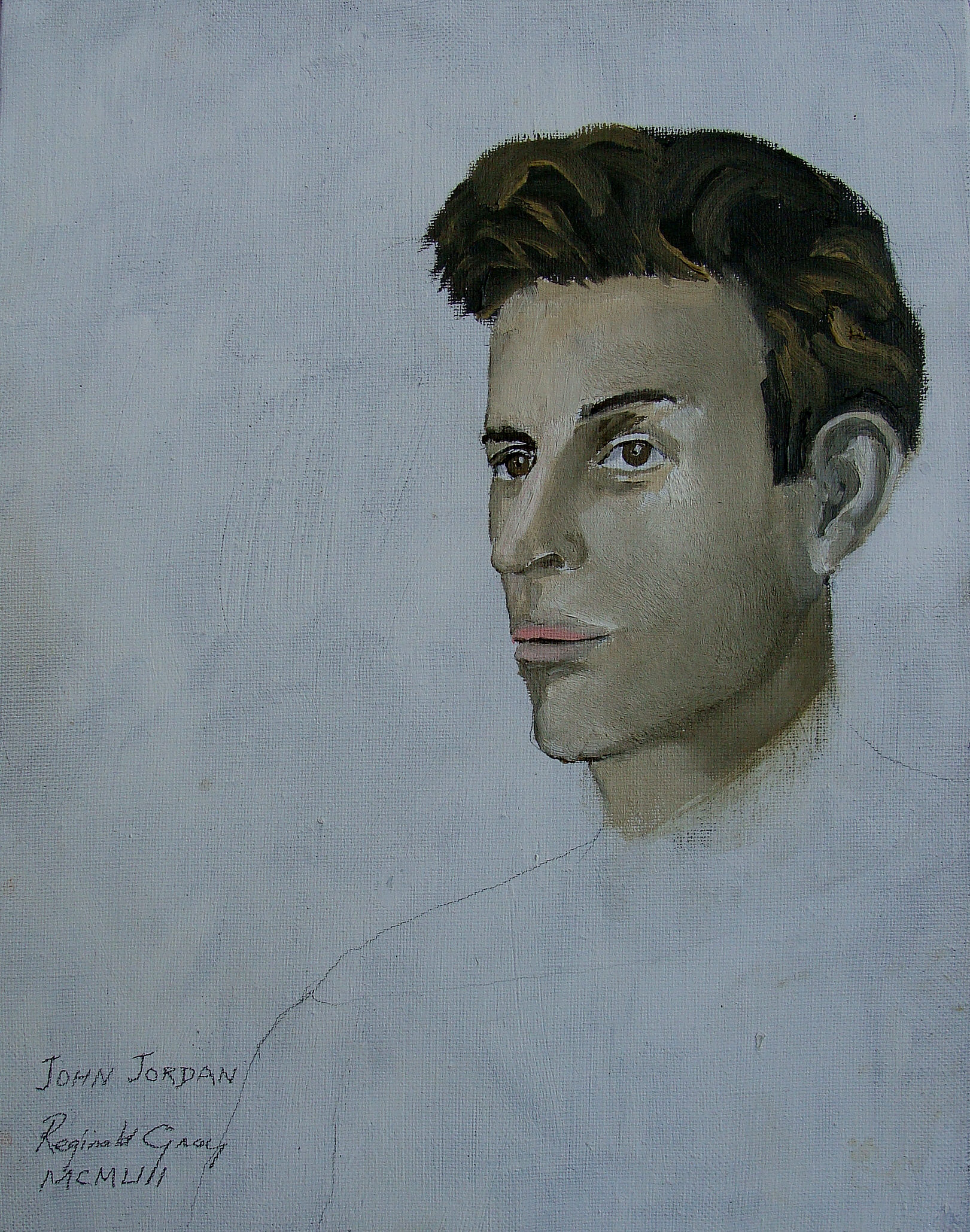
- Portrait by Reginald Gray, 1953
- Born: 8 April 1930; Dublin
- Died: 6 June 1988 (aged 58); Cardiff, Wales
- Education: University College Dublin; Pembroke College, Oxford
- Occupations: Poet, critic, short-story writer

John Jordan (8 April 1930 – 6 June 1988) was an Irish poet and short-story writer.

== Early life and education ==
Born in the Rotunda Maternity Hospital, Dublin on 8 April 1930, Jordan was educated at Synge Street CBS, University College, Dublin (U.C.D.) and Pembroke College, Oxford. In his teens, he acted on the stage of the Gate Theatre, Dublin, before winning a Scholarship in English and French to Oxford University from U.C.D.

== Career ==
In the mid-1950s he returned to U.C.D. as a lecturer in English and taught there until the end of the 1960s. He also lectured on sabbatical leave at the Memorial University in Newfoundland and briefly at Princeton University in the US. A founding member of Aosdána. He was a celebrated literary critic from the late 1950s until his death in June 1988 in Cardiff, Wales, where he had been participating in the Merriman Summer School.

== Publications ==
He was a short-story writer, a poet and a broadcaster. In 1962 he re-founded and edited the literary magazine Poetry Ireland (hoping "in the humblest of ways, to contribute towards the recreation of Dublin as a literary centre"). In this journal, he introduced a number of poets who were to become quite famous later, including Paul Durcan, Michael Hartnett and Seamus Heaney. This series of Poetry Ireland lasted until 1968–69. In 1981 he became the first editor of the new magazine published by the Poetry Ireland Society, called Poetry Ireland Review. Reviewer of novels for The Irish Times; wrote a column for Hibernia; contributed to Envoy and The Irish Press, among others; TV presenter and arts interviewer. Defended Gaelic literature and translated Pádraic Ó Conaire. Edited The Pleasures of Gaelic Literature (Mercier Press, 1977), and his translation of one of Aogán Ó Rathaille's essays was published in The Pleasures of Gaelic Poetry (London: Allen Lane, 1982). Championed the later plays of Seán O'Casey.

His Collected Poems (Dedalus Press) and Collected Stories (Poolbeg Press) were edited by his literary executor, Hugh McFadden, and published in Dublin in 1991. His Selected Prose, Crystal Clear, also edited by McFadden, was published by Lilliput Press in Dublin in 2006. Jordan's Selected Poems, edited with an Introduction by Hugh McFadden, was published in February 2008 by Dedalus Press. Uncollected stories appeared in Penguin Book of Irish Short Stories, Cyphers, and the Irish Press, among other places. His literary papers & letters are now held in the National Library of Ireland.

== Portrait ==
In 1953 the young Irish artist Reginald Gray was commissioned by University College Dublin to design the decor and costumes for their production of "The Kings Threshold" by W.B. Yeats. The leading role was given to John Jordan. During the preparations for the production, Gray started a portrait of Jordan, which he never finished. This work now hangs in The Dublin Writers Museum, Ireland.

== Bibliography ==
=== Collections of poetry ===
- Patrician Stations, New Writers Press (Dublin, 1971)
- A Raft From Flotsam, Gallery Press (Dublin, 1975)
- Blood and Stations, Gallery Press (Dublin, 1976)
- With Whom Did I Share The Crystal, (St. Bruno Press, 1980)
- Collected Poems, Dedalus Press, (Dublin, 1991)
- Selected Poems, Dedalus Press, (Dublin, 2008)

=== Prose ===
- Yarns, Poolbeg Press, (Dublin, 1977)
- Collected Stories, Poolbeg Press, (Dublin, 1991)
- Selected Prose: Crystal Clear, Lilliput Press (Dublin, 2006)

=== Editor ===
- The Pleasures of Gaelic Literature (Mercier Press, 1977)
- Poetry Ireland, 1962–68 [Nos. 1–8]
- Poetry Ireland Review, 1981–
- Special issue on Kate O'Brien, ed. John Jordan, Stony Thursday Book, vol. 7, 1981
