= Tara Bergin =

Irish poet

- Born: Tara Bergin; 1974 (age 51–52); Dublin, Ireland
- Education: Newcastle University

Tara Bergin (born 1974) is an Irish poet.

== Career ==
Tara Bergin was born in 1974 and grew up in Dublin. She moved to England in 2002 and by 2012 she was awarded her PhD from Newcastle University with a thesis on Ted Hughes’s translations of János Pilinszky. Bergin now lives in Yorkshire. She won the Seamus Heaney First Collection Prize in 2014 with her collection This is Yarrow. In 2014 she was also named a Next Generation Poet by the Poetry Book Society. Her second collection, The Tragic Death of Eleanor Marx, was shortlisted for the T. S. Eliot Prize and the Poetry Now Award.

Bergin is now part-time lecturing in Creative Writing (Poetry) in Newcastle University. In 2019 she was a contributor to A New Divan: A Lyrical Dialogue Between East and West (Gingko Library, 2019).

== Books ==
- This is Yarrow. Carcanet. 25 July 2013. ISBN 978-1-84777-287-9.
- The Tragic Death of Eleanor Marx. Carcanet. 7 August 2017. ISBN 978-1-78410-381-1.
