= Enda Wyley =

Irish writer, poet

- Born: Enda Wyley; 17 April 1966 (age 60); Dún Laoghaire, Ireland
- Education: Marino Institute of Education
- Occupations: Poet, Writer

Enda Wyley is an Irish writer of poetry and children's literature.

== Life ==
Enda Wyley was born in Dún Laoghaire, County Dublin in 1966 and lives in Dublin.

She was awarded a B.Ed. by the Marino Institute of Education, Dublin and then worked for twenty years as a primary school teacher.

She obtained an M.A in creative writing from Lancaster University.

She is married to Peter Sirr who is also a poet and they have one daughter.

== Work ==
She writes poetry and children's literature.

She has been the Poet-at-Work in the Coombe Maternity Hospital, Dublin and Writer in Residence at the Marino Institute.

== Works ==
=== Poetry ===
- Eating Baby Jesus (Dedalus Press, 1993)
- Socrates in the Garden (Dedalus Press, 1998)
- Poems for Breakfast (Dedalus Press, 2004)
- To Wake to This (Dedalus Press, 2009)
- Borrowed Space, New and Selected Poems (Dedalus Press, 2014)
- The Painter on his Bike (Dedalus Press, 2019).

=== Children's literature ===
- Boo and Bear (O'Brien Press, 2003)
- The Silver Notebook (O'Brien Press, 2007)
- I Won’t Go to China! (O'Brien Press, 2009)

== Awards ==
- 2026 - Lawrence O’Shaughnessy Poetry Award
- 2015 - Member, Aosdána -
- 2013 - Patrick and Katherine Kavanagh Fellowship for her poetry
- 2011 - Reading Association of Ireland Special Merit Award
- 1996 - Vincent Buckley Poetry Prize

== See also ==
- List of Irish writers
