= Cyrus Cassells =

American poet and professor (born 1957)

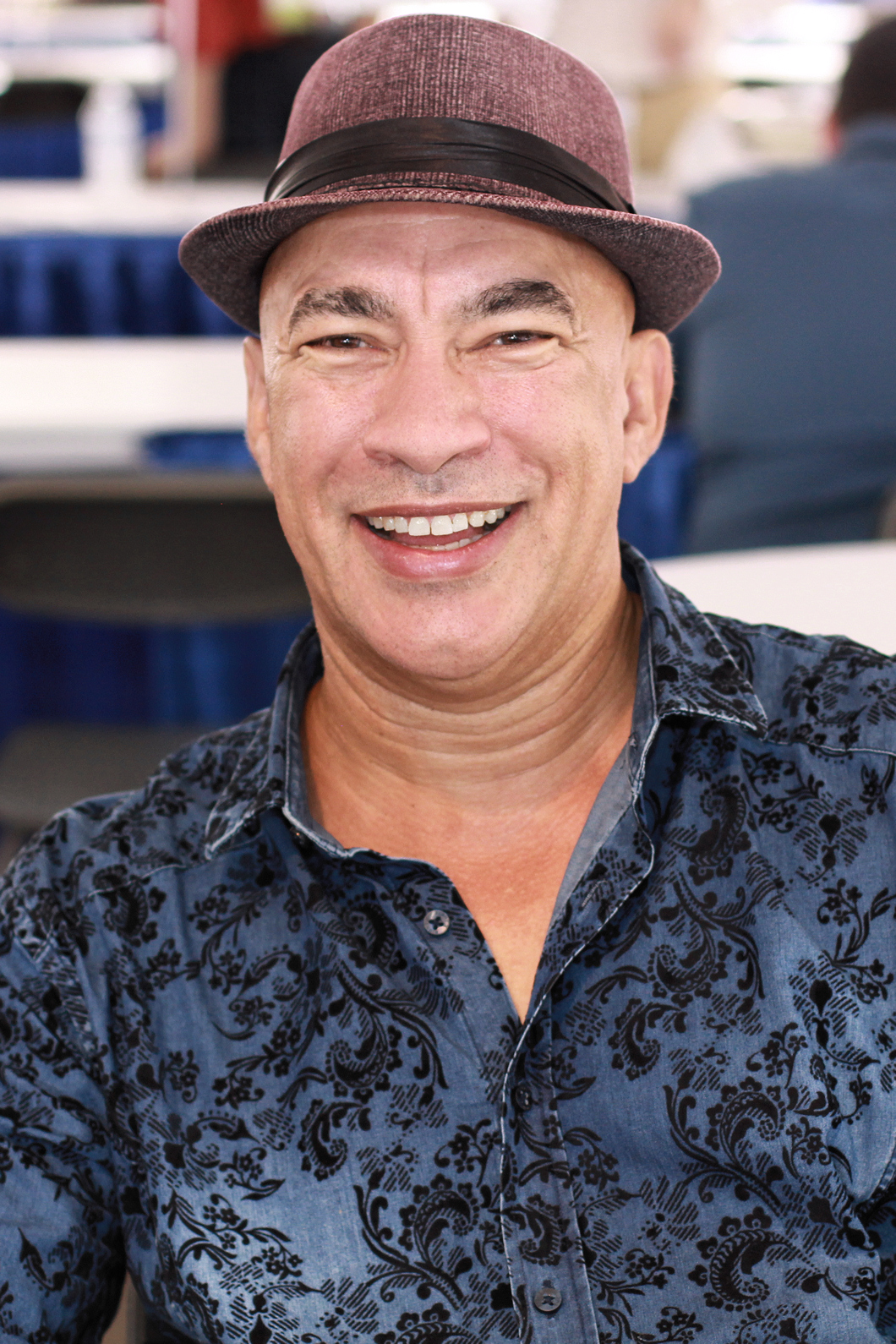
- Cassells at the 2018 Texas Book Festival
- Born: 1957 (age 68–69); Dover, Delaware

Cyrus Cassells (born 1957) is an American poet and professor.

== Life and work ==
Cassells was born in Dover, Delaware, grew up in the Mojave Desert north of Los Angeles, and began writing poetry in high school. He graduated in 1979 from Stanford University with a degree in film and broadcasting, and landed a job creating poetry filmstrips in the film division of a publishing house, where he was working when poet Al Young called to tell him that his manuscript had been selected for publication from the 1981 National Poetry Series competition. He then went on to win the 1981 National Poetry Series competition. He has worked as a translator, film critic, actor, and teacher. Since 1998, he has taught poetry at Texas State University in the MFA creative writing program. He lives in Austin.

Cassells' collection More Than Peace and Cypresses (Copper Canyon Press), and his fifth book, The Crossed-Out Swastika, (2012) were published by Copper Canyon Press. He has won many awards including a 1995 Pushcart Prize, the Lambda Literary Award, and the William Carlos Williams Award. Cassell's poems have appeared in numerous anthologies and in such journals as Ploughshares, Indiana Review, AGNI, The Literati Quarterly, Boston Review, Icarus, and Callaloo.

He is out as gay.

== Poetry collections ==
- A Poet Is Cousin to Life Itself (Tiger Bark Press: March 2027)
- The Man with the Oar on His Shoulder: Poems of Francesc Parcerisas (Tiger Bark Press: March 2027) (translator)
- Lorca to the Umpteenth Power (3: A Taos Press: June 2026)
- Everything in Life Is Resurrection: Selected Poems, 1982–2022 (TCU Press: 2025)
- Is There Room for Another Horse on Your Horse Ranch? (Four Way Books, 2024)
- To The Cypress Again and Again: Tribute to Salvador Espriu (Stephen F. Austin State University Press, 2023) (writer and translator)
- The World That the Shooter Left Us (Four Way Books, 2022)
- More Than Watchmen at Daybreak (Nine Mile Books, 2020)
- Still Life with Children: Selected Poems of Francesc Parcerisas (Stephen F. Austin State University Press, 2019) (translator)
- The Gospel according to Wild Indigo (Southern Illinois University Press, 2018)
- The Crossed-Out Swastika (Copper Canyon Press, 2012)
- More Than Peace and Cypresses (Copper Canyon Press, 2004)
- Beautiful Signor (Copper Canyon Press, 1997)
- Soul Make a Path Through Shouting (Copper Canyon Press, 1994)
- The Mud Actor (Holt, Rinehart and Winston, 1982)

== Honors and awards ==
- 2025 Jackson Poetry Prize, given by Poets & Writers for "a poet of exceptional talent."
- 2025 Named a Best New Poetry Book by the New York Public Library for Is There Room for Another Horse on Your Horse Ranch?
- 2025 Pushcart Prize for "Lorca to the Umpteenth Power"
- 2025-26 Rome Prize in Literature, given by the American Academy in Rome (finalist)
- 2024 The Texas Institute of Letters Souerette Diehl Fraser Award for Best Translated Book for To The Cypress Again and Again: Tribute to Salvador Espriu (Co-winner)
- 2023 Housatonic Book Award in Poetry for The World That the Shooter Left Us (finalist)
- 2023 Regents' Professor, Texas State University
- 2023 University Distinguished Professor, Texas State University
- 2023 Civitella Rainieri Fellowship
- 2022 Poet Laureate Fellowship from The Academy of American Poets
- 2021 Presidential Excellence Award from Texas State University
- 2021-2022 Poet Laureate of Texas
- 2020 The Texas Institute of Letters Souerette Diehl Fraser Award for Best Translated Book for Still Life with Children: Selected Poems of Francesc Parcerisas
- 2019 Guggenheim Foundation Fellowship
- 2019 The National Poetry Series finalist for Is There Room For Another Horse on Your Horse Ranch?
- 2019 Artist in Residence, Helene Wurlitzer Foundation of Taos, New Mexico
- 2019 Resident Fellowship, Mabel Dodge Foundation
- 2019 Finalist, NAACP Image Award for Outstanding Work of Literature—Poetry for The Gospel according to Wild Indigo
- 2019 Finalist, Texas Institute of Letters Helen C. Smith Memorial Award for Best Book of Poetry for The Gospel according to Wild Indigo
- 2019 Finalist, Balcones Prize for Outstanding Poetry Book of 2018 for The Gospel according to Wild Indigo
- 2014 Resident Fellowship, Lannan Foundation, Marfa, Texas
- 2012 Finalist, Balcones Prize for Outstanding Poetry Book of 2012 for The Crossed-Out Swastika
- 2008 Resident Fellowship, Lannan Foundation, Marfa, Texas
- 2006 Rockefeller Foundation Fellowship: Bellagio
- 2005 NEA Literature Fellowship in Poetry
- 2005 Austin Circle of Theaters, B. Iden Payne Award winner: Best Comedy for The Dog in the Manger (Austin Shakespeare cast member)
- 2004 Library Journal Best Poetry Books of the Year for More Than Peace and Cypresses
- 2004 Lannan Literary Selection Book for More Than Peace and Cypresses
- 2003 Austin Circle of Theaters, B. Iden Payne Award nominee, Best Featured Actor in a Drama for Jitney
- 1997 Finalist, Bay Area Book Reviewers Award for Beautiful Signor
- 1997 Lambda Literary Award for Beautiful Signor
- 1997 Sister Circle Book Award for Beautiful Signor
- 1995 Pushcart Prize for "Sung from a Hospice"
- 1995 Finalist, Lenore Marshall Prize for Soul Make a Path through Shouting
- 1994 Publishers Weekly Best Poetry Books of the Year for Soul Make a Path through Shouting
- 1994 William Carlos Williams Award for Soul Make a Path Through Shouting
- 1993 Rockefeller Foundation: Bellagio resident fellowship
- 1993 Lannan Literary Award - Poetry
- 1992 Peter I.B. Lavan Younger Poet Award
- 1992 Finalist, AWP Poetry Prize for Soul Make a Path through Shouting
- 1986 NEA Literature Fellowship in Poetry
- 1984 Resident fellowship, Helene Wurlitzer Foundation of Taos, New Mexico
- 1983 Writer in Residence, The Millay Colony
- 1983 Writer in Residence, Yaddo
- 1983 Bay Area Book Reviewers Award finalist for The Mud Actor
- 1982-83 Resident Fellowship, Fine Arts Work Center, Provincetown, Massachusetts
- 1981 National Poetry Series Prize for The Mud Actor
- 1979 Academy of American Poets Prize (Stanford University)
