= Richard Murphy (poet) =

Anglo-Irish poet (1927–2018)

Richard Kerr Murphy (6 August 1927 – 30 January 2018) was an Anglo-Irish poet.

== Biography ==
=== Early years ===
Murphy was born to an Anglo-Irish family at Milford House, near the County Mayo–Galway border, in 1927. He spent much of his early childhood in Ceylon (now Sri Lanka) where his father William Lindsay Murphy served in the Colonial Service and was active as mayor of Colombo, later becoming Governor General of the Bahamas (in succession to the Duke of Windsor). Murphy received his education at the King's School, Canterbury and Wellington College. He won a scholarship to Magdalen College, Oxford at the age of 17, where he studied English under C.S. Lewis. He was later educated at the Sorbonne, and ran a school in Crete between 1953 and 1954. In his Archaeology of Love (1955), Murphy reflects on his experiences in England and Continental Europe.

His childhood in Ireland was documented in the film The Other Irish Travellers, made by his niece Fiona Murphy.

=== Return to Ireland ===
In 1954, he settled in Cleggan, on the coast of Galway. Several years later, in 1959, he purchased and renovated the Ave Maria, a traditional hooker-type boat, from Inishbofin fisherman, Michael Schofield, which he used to ferry visitors to the island. He purchased Ardoileán (High Island), a small island in the vicinity of Inishbofin, in 1969.

== Personal life ==
Murphy married Patsy Strang. From 1971, he was a poet-in-residence at nine American universities, in Princeton turning his office also into his bedroom, Joyce Carol Oates writing a short story about this. In later years he lived in Sri Lanka, having previously divided his time between Durban, South Africa, where his daughter and her family reside, and Dublin. He was the maternal grandfather of YouTuber Caspar Lee. A memoir of his life and times, The Kick, was published by Granta in 2002, constructed from detailed diaries kept over the course of five decades.

Murphy died at his Sri Lanka home on 30 January 2018.

== Awards and honours ==
- AE Memorial Award for Poetry, 1951
- First prize, Guinness Awards, 1962
- British Arts Council Award, 1967 and 1976
- Irish Arts Council Award (Marten Toonder), 1980
- Fellow of the Royal Society of Literature, 1969
- Member of Aosdána, Ireland, 1982
- American Irish Foundation Literary Award, 1983
- Included in the Oxford Companion to English Literature, 1985
- Poetry Book Society Translation Award, London, 1989
- Society of Authors Foundation Award, 2002

== Bibliography ==
His poetry collections include:

- The Archaeology of Love (Dolmen, 1955)
- Sailing to an Island (Faber, 1963)
- The Battle of Aughrim (Knopf and Faber, 1968; LP recording 1969)
- High Island (Faber, 1974)
- High Island: New and Selected Poems (Harper and Row, 1975)
- Selected Poems (Faber, 1979)
- The Price of Stone (Faber, 1985)
- The Price of Stone and Earlier Poems (Wake Forest University Press, Winston-Salem, 1985)
- New Selected Poems (Faber, 1989)
- The Mirror Wall (Bloodaxe Books, Newcastle upon Tyne, 1989; Wolfhound Press, Dublin, 1989, Wake Forest U. Press, 1989)
- The Mayo Anthology (editor; Mayo County Council, 1990)
- In The Heart Of The Country: Collected Poems (Oldcastle, Co. Meath, Gallery Press, 2000)
- Collected Poems (Wake Forest University Press, Winston-Salem, 2001)
- The Pleasure Ground: Poems 1952–2012 (Bloodaxe Books, Tarset, 2013; Lilliput Press, Dublin, 2012)

Memoirs:

- The Kick. A Life among Writers (Granta, 2002)

Interviews:

- "Richard Murphy – reflections and stories of Seamus Heaney". radionz.co.nz.

Radio New Zealand interview with Richard Murphy following the death of Seamus Heaney in 2013.

- Interview with Richard Murphy: An old spectator hand http://blogs.spectator.co.uk/books/2013/09/interview-with-a-poet-richard-murphy-an-old-spectator-hand/

== See also ==
- Members of Aosdána

== Secondary sources ==
- Welch, Robert (ed.). The Oxford Companion to Irish Literature. p. 383.
