= Edward O'Dwyer (poet) =

Irish poet, author

- Born: 1984 (age 41–42); Limerick, Ireland
- Occupations: Poet; Author; Teacher
- Writing career
- Period: 2014–
- Notable works: The Rain On Cruise's Street (2014); Bad News, Good News, Bad News (2017); Cheat Sheets (2018); Exquisite Prisons (2022)
- Notable awards: Best Single Poem 2018

Edward O'Dwyer is an Irish poet, fiction writer and secondary school teacher.

== Biography ==
Edward O'Dwyer was born in Limerick in 1999. He started writing poems in 2006 after earning a degree in English and Media.

He published his first collection of poems in the book The Rain On Cruise's Street in 2014, which was highly commended in the Forward Prizes. He then wrote Bad News, Good News, Bad News (2017), which contains the poem, ‘The Whole History of Dancing’, which won the Best Original Poem award from Eigse Michael Hartnett Festival 2018. In 2018, O'Dwyer published his first book, Cheat Sheets, a collection of 108 short stories of dark comedies on the theme of infidelity and features on The Lonely Crowd journal’s ‘Best Books of 2018’ list. He has written the follow-up, Are You Waiting For Love?, and, during lockdown, his first novel, The Last Bite. In 2022, O'Dwyer published his latest poetry book, Exquisite Prisons.

In 2010 he was selected for Poetry Ireland's Introduction Series and the same year edited the anthology Sextet for Revival Press, and read in Ljubljana, Slovenia, funded by Culture Ireland. He has represented Ireland at Poesiefestival Berlin, for their European ‘renshi’ project, took part in Poetry Ireland’s Introductions series. He has been nominated for the Hennessy Literary Award for Emerging Poetry, and was nominated by the journal Gloom Cupboard for a Pushcart Prize. Edward O’Dwyer is the Poet Laureate for Poetry Ireland for Adare, County Limerick.

O'Dwyer works as a secondary school teacher in Ireland, where he teaches Religious education, English and History.

== Publications ==
- The Rain On Cruise's Street (Salmon Poetry 2014) ISBN 978-1908836816
- Bad News, Good News, Bad News (Salmon Poetry 2017) ISBN 978-1910669815
- Cheat Sheets (Truth Serum Press 2018) ISBN 978-1925536607
- Exquisite Prisons (Salmon Poetry 2022) ISBN 978-1915022257
