= Ulster Tatler =

Northern Irish magazine

- Editor: Chris Sherry
- Categories: Lifestyle
- Frequency: Monthly
- Founded: 1966
- Company: Ulster Tatler Publications
- Country: Northern Ireland
- Based in: Belfast
- Website: Ulster Tatler

Ulster Tatler is a lifestyle and society magazine based in Belfast, Northern Ireland, which was founded in 1966.

Established in 1966, the Ulster Tatler is Northern Ireland's longest established monthly. It has coverage of events in the Northern Ireland social calendar as well as local fashions. During the early years of The Troubles, it made of point of never making any comment on the political or social problems of the province; rather it reflected the high society and other social events of the time.

The Ulster Tatler was one of the first magazines in Northern Ireland to join the Audited Bureau of Circulations back in 1995 and, as of 2008, had an ABC circulation figure of 10,866 (Jan-Dec 2008). The publication received the IPR "magazine of the year" award for 2006/07.

The magazine awards a prize, Ulster Tatler Award. Past winners have included Carl Frampton, Christine Bleakley and poet Michael Longley.
