= Medbh McGuckian =

Poet from Northern Ireland (born 1950)

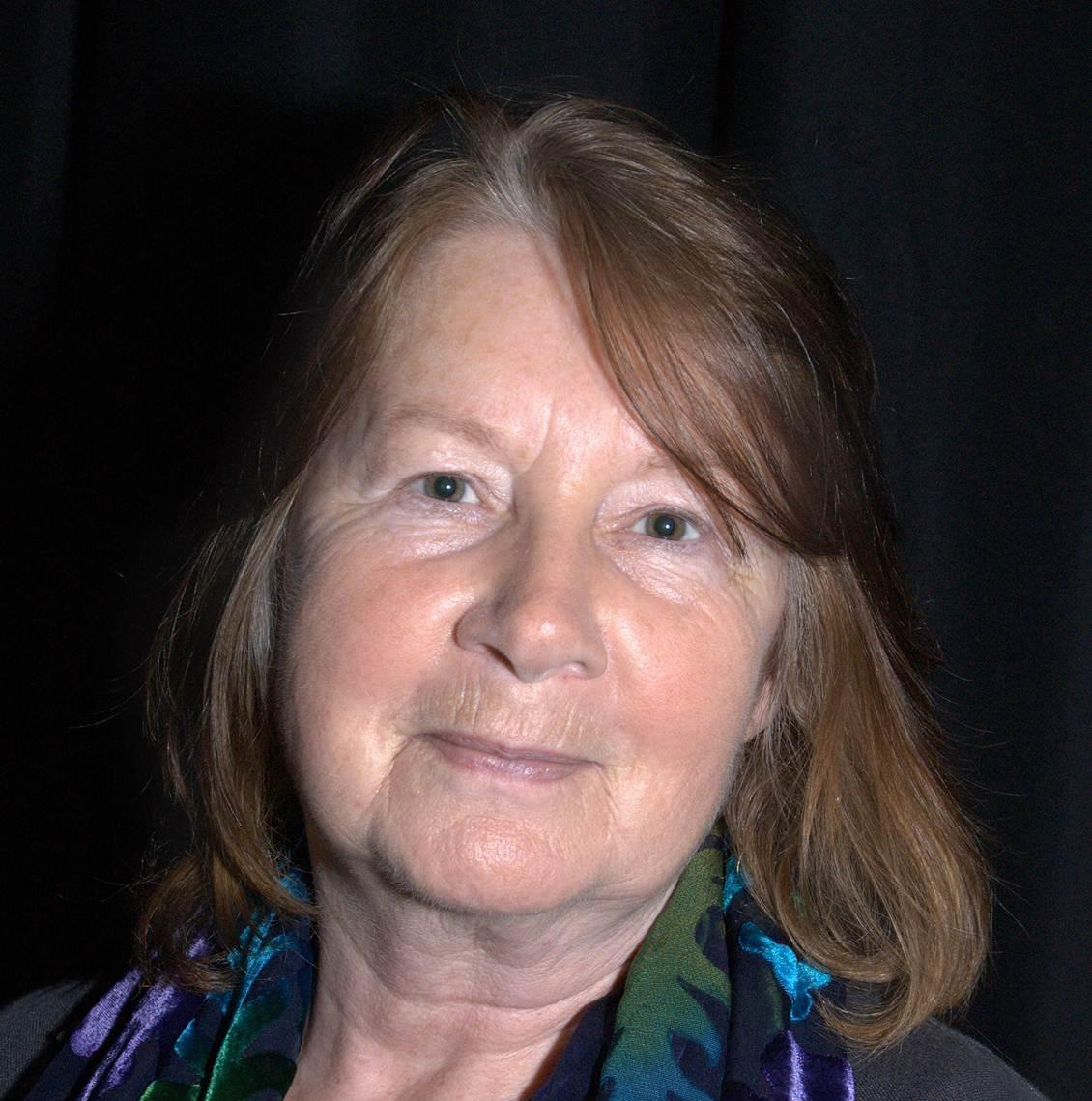
- Born: Maeve McCaughan; 12 August 1950 (age 76); Belfast, Northern Ireland
- Education: Queen's University Belfast
- Occupations: Poet, editor, teacher
- Writing career
- Language: English

Medbh McGuckian (born as Maeve McCaughan on 12 August 1950) is a poet from Northern Ireland.

== Biography ==
She was born the third of six children as Maeve McCaughan to Hugh and Margaret McCaughan in North Belfast. Her father was a school headmaster and her mother an influential art and music enthusiast. She was educated at Holy Family Primary School and Dominican College, Fortwilliam and earned a Bachelor of Arts degree in 1972 and a Master of Arts degree in 1974 at Queen's University Belfast. Maeve McCaughan adopted the Irish spelling of her name, Medbh, when her university teacher, Seamus Heaney, wrote her name that way when signing books to her. She married a teacher and poet, John McGuckian, in 1977.

She has worked as a teacher in her native Belfast at St. Patrick's College, Knock and an editor and was the first female Writer in Residence at Queen's University Belfast (1985–1988). She spent part of a term appointed as visiting poet and instructor in creative writing at the University of California, Berkeley (1991).

== Work ==
McGuckian's first published poems appeared in two pamphlets, Single Ladies: Sixteen Poems and Portrait of Joanna, in 1980, the year in which she received an Eric Gregory Award. In 1981 she co-published Trio Poetry 2 with fellow poets Damian Gorman and Douglas Marshall (poet), and in 1989 she collaborated with Nuala Archer on Two Women, Two Shores. Medbh McGuckian's first major collection, The Flower Master (1982), which explores post-natal breakdown, was awarded a Rooney Prize for Irish Literature, an Arts Council (Ireland) award (both 1982) and an Alice Hunt Bartlett Prize (1983). She is also the winner of the 1989 Cheltenham Prize for her collection On Ballycastle Beach (Wake Forest University Press).

Medbh McGuckian has edited an anthology, The Big Striped Golfing Umbrella: Poems by Young People from Northern Ireland (1985) for the Arts Council of Northern Ireland, written a study of the car in the poetry of Seamus Heaney, entitled Horsepower Pass By! (1999), and has translated into English (with Eiléan Ní Chuilleanáin) The Water Horse (1999), a selection of poems in Irish by Nuala Ní Dhomhnaill. A volume of Selected Poems: 1978–1994 was published in 1997, and among her latest collections are The Book of the Angel (2004) The Currach Requires No Harbours (2007), and My Love Has Fared Inland (2008). The Currach Requires No Harbours includes a poem inspired by the lives of the Wrens of the Curragh.

She was awarded the 2002 Forward Poetry Prize (Best Single Poem) for her poem "She is in the Past, She Has This Grace". She has been shortlisted twice for the Poetry Now Award for her collection, The Book of the Angel, in 2005, and for The Currach Requires No Harbour, in 2007.

== Bibliography ==
=== Poetry collections ===
- Single Ladies: Sixteen Poems (chapbook), Interim Press, 1980
- Portrait of Joanne (chapbook), Ulsterman, 1980
- (With Damian Gorman and Douglas Marshall) Trio Poetry, Blackstaff Press, 1981
- The Flower Master, Oxford University Press, 1982, reprinted as The Flower Master and Other Poems, Gallery Press (County Meath), 1993
- The Greenhouse, Steane, 1983
- Venus and the Rain, Oxford University Press, 1984
- On Ballycastle Beach, Oxford University Press, 1988, reprinted, Gallery Books, 1995
- (With Nuala Archer) Two Women, Two Shores, New Poets, 1989
- Marconi's Cottage, Gallery Press (County Meath), 1991
- Captain Lavender, Wake Forest University Press (Winston-Salem, NC), 1995
- Selected Poems, 1978–1994, Gallery Press (County Meath), 1997
- Shemalier, Wake Forest University Press (Winston-Salem, NC), 1998
- Drawing Ballerinas, Gallery Press (County Meath), 2001
- The Face of the Earth, Gallery Press (County Meath), 2002
- Had I A Thousand Lives, Gallery Press (County Meath), 2003
- The Book of the Angel, Gallery Press (County Meath), 2004
- My Love Has Fared Inland, Gallery Press (County Meath), 2008
- The Currach Requires No Harbours, Wake Forest University Press (Winston-Salem, NC), 2010
- The High Caul Cap, Gallery Press (County Meath), 2012
- Blaris Moor, Gallery Press (County Meath), 2015
- Love, The Magician, Arlen House (County Dublin), 2018
- Marine Cloud Brightening, Gallery Press (County Meath), 2019

=== Other works ===
- (Editor) The Big Striped Golfing Umbrella: Poems by Young People from Northern Ireland, illustrated by Anne Carlisle, Arts Council of Northern Ireland, Belfast, 1985
- Horsepower Pass By! A Study of the Car in the Poetry of Seamus Heaney, University of Ulster, Cranagh Press, Coleraine, 1999
- (Translator, with Eiléan Ní Chuilleanáin) The Water Horse: Poems in Irish by Nuala Ní Dhomhnaill, Gallery Press, 1999
