= David Wheatley (poet) =

Irish poet and critic (born 1970)

David Wheatley (born 1970) is an Irish poet and critic. He was born in Dublin and studied at Trinity College, Dublin, where he edited Icarus. Wheatley is the author of four volumes of poetry with Gallery Press, as well as several chapbooks. He has also edited the work of James Clarence Mangan, and features in the Bloodaxe anthology The New Irish Poets (Bloodaxe, 2005), and the Wake Forest Irish Poetry Series Vol. 1 (Wake Forest UP, 2005).

He teaches at the University of Aberdeen, having previously taught at Hull. He has been shortlisted twice for the Poetry Now Award (2007, 2018), and was awarded The Vincent Buckley Poetry Prize, in 2008.

== Bibliography ==
=== Poetry ===
Collections

- Thirst (Gallery Press, 1997)
- Misery Hill (Gallery Press, 2000)
- Three-Legged Dog (with Caitriona O'Reilly; Wild Honey Press, 2002)
- Mocker (Gallery Press, 2006)
- Architexts (with Cliff Forshaw, David Kennedy and Christopher Reid; Hull City Council, 2007)
- Lament for Ali Farka Touré (Rack Press, 2008)
- Drift (with Cliff Forshaw, David Kennedy, Simon Kerr and Christopher Reid; Hull City Council, 2008)
- Hide (collaborative; Hull City Council, 2010)
- A Nest on the Waves (Gallery Press, 2010)
- Flowering Skullcap (Wurm Press, 2012)
- The Reed Bunting Unseen: A Camouflage Garden for Ian Hamilton Finlay (Wild Honey Press, 2013)
- The President of Planet Earth (Carcanet/Wake Forest UP, 2017)
- Aifric Mac Aodha, Foreign News (as translator, Gallery Press, 2017)
- Sarajevo Street (Bennachie Press, 2018)
- Our Lady of the Snows (Clutag Press, 2018)
- Child Ballad (Carcanet, 2023)

Edited anthologies and collections

- James Clarence Mangan, Poems (Gallery Press, 2003)
- Samuel Beckett, Selected Poems 1930-1989 (Faber and Faber, 2009)
- The Wake Forest Irish Poetry Series, Vol. 4 (Wake Forest University Press, 2017)
- Companions of His Thoughts More Green: Poems for Andrew Marvell (Broken Sleep Books, 2022)
- During the Late and Long Continuing Cold: An Eightieth-Birthday Tribute to Peter Didsbury (with Sean O'Brien, Broken Sleep Books, 2026)

List of poems

Title	Year	First published	Reprinted/collected
One door may conceal another	2019	Wheatley, David (7–20 March 2019). "One door may conceal another". The New York Review of Books. 66 (4): 16.	

=== Novel ===
- Stretto (CB Editions, 2022)

=== Other Prose ===
- Dark and True and Tender (CB Editions, 2012)
- Contemporary British Poetry (Readers' Guides to Essential Criticism) (Palgrave, 2014)
- The Wandering Mountains (Hercules Editions), 2020)
- Stravaig (Broken Sleep Books, 2021)
- The Cambridge History of Irish Women's Poetry (co-edited with Ailbhe Darcy, Cambridge University Press, 2021)

=== Plays ===
- Zero at the Bone (Smithereens Press, 2013)
- Stravaig (Broken Sleep Books, 2021)
