= Rudi Holzapfel =

Irish poet and teacher (1938–2005)

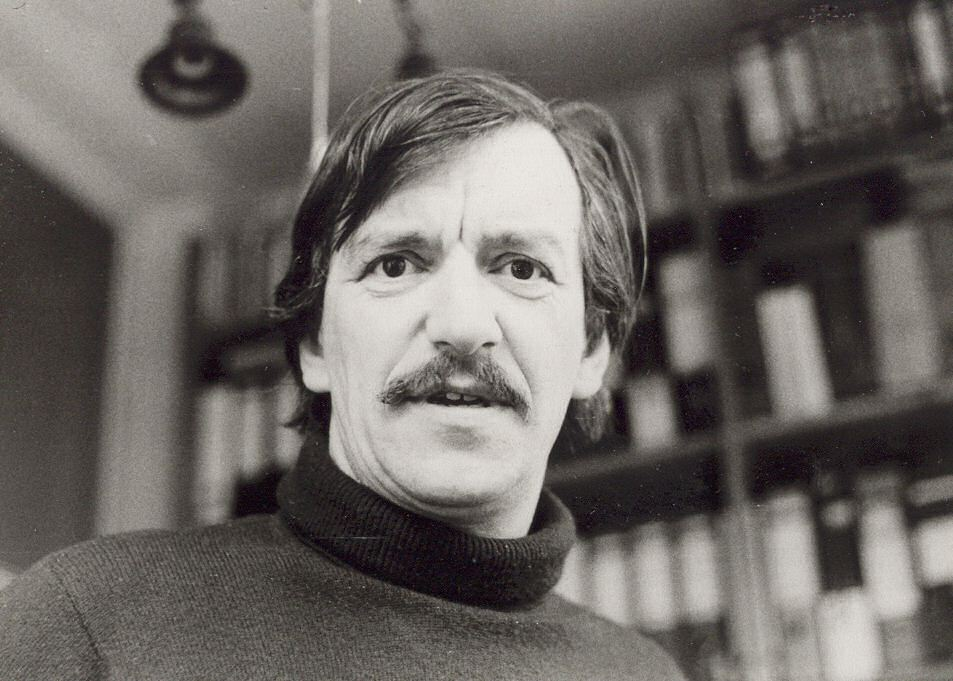
Rudi Holzapfel

Rudolf Patrick (Rudi) Holzapfel (11 December 1938 in Paris, France – 6 February 2005 in Bonn, Germany) was an Irish poet and teacher.

== Early life ==
His father, Rudolf Melander Holzapfel (1900–1982), was a Shakespeare scholar, expert on Old Master paintings, and art dealer. His mother, Mona Trew Holzapfel (1914–1998) and Iris Trew were original members of the Bluebell Girls, founded in 1932, by Margaret Kelly (1910–2004) at the Folies Bergère.

Kelly's dance troupe after December 1933 performed at Paramount cinema (on the Boulevard des Capucines) and later also expanded back to the Folies Bergère. Following the German occupation of Paris in 1940, Kelly produced a show at Le Chantilly, a small cabaret at 10, rue Fontaine, 9th arrondissement of Paris, now the Théâtre Fontaine.

The family relocated to America, living in California between 1946 and 1956, where Rudi Holzapfel graduated from Santa Barbara Catholic High School.

== Education ==
From 1956 to 1970, Holzapfel worked various jobs in England and Ireland, and studied - attaining a M. Litt. with his thesis "Irish Literary Periodicals from 1900 to the Present Day" (1964) - at Trinity College, Dublin, where he edited Icarus. It was during these years that Holzapfel began to identify with Ireland and the cause of Irish nationalism; he has said he would like to be considered a true inheritor of the spiritual legacy of the Gaelic Bards. He began a lifelong study and appreciation of James Clarence Mangan (1803–1849), who he describes as the greatest Irish poet before Yeats. In 1969, Holzapfel published James Clarence Mangan: A Checklist of Printed and Other Sources (Dublin: Scepter).

== Career ==
From 1970 to the late 1980s, Holzapfel lived in Germany, teaching English and Literature, especially at the Emil-Fischer-Gymnasium in Euskirchen. Holzapfel has published more than twenty-five books of poetry, some under his own imprint, Sunburst Press (Blackrock, County Dublin). An early book of poetry, Cast a Cold Eye, was written with Brendan Kennelly (Dolmen Press, 1959). Holzapfel has published with other Irish authors, including Oliver Snoddy and John Farrell, and his work has been anthologized in the Penguin Book of Irish Verse and Modern Irish Poets. With a circle of other Mangan scholars, including Jacques Chuto, Peter Van de Kamp, Peter MacMahon, and Ellen Shannon-Mangan, Holzapfel has edited selections of Mangan's prose and poems for the Irish Academic Press.

Rudi Holzapfel died in Bonn, Germany, on 6 February 2005. His grave is to be found at the Poppelsdorfer Friedhof. His final book of Sonnets, A Tiger Says His Prayers, was published posthumously in 2006.

== Works ==
- Cast a Cold Eye, 1959, with Brendan Kennelly
- Romances [by "rooan hurkey"], 1960, Sunburst Press
- The Rain, the Moon, 1961, with Brendan Kennelly
- The Dark About Our Loves, 1962, with Brendan Kennelly
- Poems: Green Townlands (Leeds), 1963, with Brendan Kennelly
- Transubstantiations, 1963
- The Leprechaun [by "R. Patrick Ward"], 1963
- Why Hitler is in Heaven (satirical ballad), 1964
- Nollaig by Rudi Holzappel [sic] and Oliver Snoddy, 1964
- Translations From The English, 1965, The Museum Bookshop, Dublin
- The Rebel Bloom, Leeds, 1967
- For Love of Ireland (Broadsheet with 9 poems), [the author], Leeds, 1967
- No Road beyond Vallombrosa, 1968
- Parasites Lost, (Rudi Patrick Sebastian Holzapfel and John Joseph Conleth Farrell), 1970, Privately Printed, Cork
- Soledades, n.d., [1974], Sunburst Press
- Whom a Dream Hath Possessed, 1975, Sunburst Press
- A Smile Dies, 1978, Sunburst Press
- Repeat after me [with Hermann Brunken], 1980, Woodway Press, Euskirchen
- Poems Written Swiftly, 1982, Sunburst Press
- Buckshot (Aphorisms), 1983
- Turning and Manipulation, 1986, Sunburst Press
- Ask Silence Why, 1961-1982, selected poems edited by Ellen Shannon-Mangan, Dublin, 1987, Beaver Row Press
- The Light of Loss, December 1987, Sunburst Press
- And Other Poems, 1987, Pioneer Printing, New York
- White Alligators, 1991, Sunburst Press
- For Ronnie, 1993 (single leaf - to be read at the graveside)
- An Cheapach, 1993, Sunburst Press
- Dark Harvest, 1997, Sunburst Press
- Sonnets, 2001, Sunburst Press
- The Thieves of Dream, 2003, Sunburst Press
- A Tiger Says His Prayers, 2006, Sunburst Press
