= John Ennis (poet) =

Irish poet born in Westmeath in 1944

John Ennis is an Irish poet born in County Westmeath in 1944.

== Life ==
He retired as head of the School of Humanities at Waterford Institute of Technology in 2009 and now divides his time between Waterford and County Westmeath. He is a graduate of University College Cork and University College Dublin. He won the Patrick Kavanagh Poetry Award in 1975, the Listowel Open Poetry Competition eleven times, and the Irish American Cultural Institute Award in 1996. He has been editor of Poetry Ireland Review and served on the board of Poetry Ireland for eleven years. From 2003 to 2007, he co-edited three anthologies of Canadian – Irish Poetry. In 2008, Memorial University of Newfoundland awarded him an Honorary Doctorate in Laws for fostering links between Ireland and Newfoundland, and for his poetry. In the 1990s, Seamus Heaney chose him as Ireland's most undeservedly neglected poet.

== Poetry books ==
- Night on Hibernia (Oldcastle, County Meath, The Gallery Press, 1976)
- Dolmen Hill (The Gallery Press, 1977)
- A Drink of Spring (The Gallery Press, 1979)
- The Burren Days (The Gallery Press, 1985)
- Arboretum (Dublin, The Dedalus Press, 1990)
- In a Green Shade (The Dedalus Press, 1991)
- Down in the Deeper Helicon (Dedalus Press, 1994)
- Telling the Bees (Dedalus Press, 1995)
- Selected Poems (Dedalus Press, 1996)
- Tráithníní (Dedalus Press, 2000)
- Near St Mullins (Dedalus, 2002).
- Postponing Ásbyrgi (Three Spires Press, 2012)
- A Pullet for Jack (Book Hub Publishing, 2014)
