= Parallax: And Selected Poems =

Fifth poetry collection by Sinéad Morrisey

- First edition
- Author: Sinéad Morrissey
- Language: English
- Genre: Poetry
- Publisher: Carcanet Press
- Publication date: 28 June 2013
- Media type: Print
- Pages: 69
- ISBN: 9781847774422
- Preceded by: Through the Square Window

Parallax is the fifth poetry collection written by Irish poet Sinéad Morrissey. First published in 2013, by Carcanet Press, the collection of poems focus on the premise of the appearance and position of an object being changed by the change in the position of the observer. In 2015, after becoming the fourth shortlisted poem written by Morrissey, it received the T. S. Eliot Prize.

== Themes and ideas ==
Parallax's theme is the parallax. "Parallax", by definition, means "the apparent displacement or the difference in apparent direction of an object as seen from two different points not on a straight line with the object". The collection focuses on the change in position of an object being changed by the actual viewpoint of the observer.

== Conception ==
Morrissey states in an interview that what inspired the idea and creation of the poems were pictures she would find in books and on the internet. Most notably, images of the slums in Belfast photographed by the Edwardian photographer Alexander Robert Hogg. After the creation of the poetry, she decided on a title after discussing the photographic term "parallax" with her colleague at Queens, the term refers to the disjunction of what the photographer sees through the viewfinder and what is taken through the aperture.

== Reception ==
Parallax has received positive reception from the majority of sources. British poet Ian Duhig, the chair of the final judging panel for the T. S. Eliot Prize, praised the collection as "politically, historically and personally ambitious, expressed in beautifully turned language".

Fran Brearton, reviewing the collection for The Guardian, praises the collection as "a deft exploration of the artificiality of art in framing and containing its subject". She commented on Morrissey's writing, saying that there is more to the poems than what is presented on the surface with her "clarity of style and clean lines", that each poem provides more than what meets the eye, fitting the theme of the poetry collection.
