= Joel Deane =

Australian novelist and poet

- Born: 1969 (age 56–57); Melbourne, Victoria, Australia
- Occupations: Poet, novelist and speechwriter
- Writing career
- Notable awards: 2017 Prime Minister's Literary Awards — Poetry, shortlisted

Joel Deane (born 1969) is an Australian poet, novelist, and speechwriter.

== Bibliography ==
=== Non-fiction ===
- Catch and Kill: The Politics of Power (UQP, 2015) ISBN 978-0-7022-4980-8

=== Fiction ===
- Another (IP, 2004) ISBN 1-876819-25-1
- The Norseman's Song (Hunter, 2010) ISBN 978-0-9807405-2-3
- Judas Boys (Hunter Publishers, 2023) ISBN 9780648848158

=== Poetry ===
- Subterranean Radio Songs Interactive Publications (2005) ISBN 978-1-876819-31-6
- 10 Pound Poems, Picaro Press (2007) ISBN 978-1-920957-47-6
- Magisterium, Australian Scholarly Publishing (2008) ISBN 978-1-74097-179-9
- Year of the Wasp, Hunter Publishers (2016) ISBN 9780994352859

=== Selected book reviews ===
Year	Review article	Work(s) reviewed
2014	Deane, Joel (September 2014). "'Gendered, pornographic, violent' : the making of a new Labor martyr". Australian Book Review. 364: 20–21.	Delahunty, Mary. Gravity : inside the PM's office during her last year and final days. Hardie Grant Books.; Bramston, Troy. Rudd, Gillard and beyond. Penguin.

== Awards ==
- 2016 Queensland Literary Awards — Judith Wright Calanthe Award, shortlisted for Year of the Wasp
- 2017 Prime Minister's Literary Awards – Poetry, shortlisted for Year of the Wasp
- 2018 Vincent Buckley Poetry Prize, winner
