= Miriam Gamble =

Belgian-Irish poet and academic

- Born: 1980 (age 45–46); Brussels, Belgium
- Education: University of Oxford; Queen's University of Belfast
- Writing career
- Notable works: The Squirrels Are Dead (2010); Pirate Music (2014)

Miriam Gamble (born 1980) is a poet who won the Eric Gregory Award in 2007 and the Somerset Maugham Award in 2011. She works as a lecturer at the University of Edinburgh.

== Life and career ==
Miriam Gamble was born in Brussels, Belgium, in 1980 and grew up in Belfast in Northern Ireland. She studied English Language and Literature at the University of Oxford and Modern Literary Studies at Queen's University of Belfast where she also received her PhD in Form, Genre and Lyric Subjectivity in Contemporary British and Irish Poetry. She moved to Scotland in 2010 and began teaching creative writing at the University of Edinburgh in 2012.

Her first collection of poems, The Squirrels Are Dead, was published in 2010 by Bloodaxe Books. Gamble's second collection, Pirate Music, was also published by Bloodaxe Books. Her third, What Planet, was published by Bloodaxe in May 2019 and received the 2020 Pigott Poetry Prize.

== Awards and nominations ==
- 2007 – Eric Gregory Award
- 2010 – Ireland Chair of Poetry Bursary Award
- 2011 – Somerset Maugham Award for The Squirrels Are Dead
- 2012 – Vincent Buckley Poetry Prize
- 2020 – Pigott Poetry Prize
