= Kavanagh Fellowship =

Irish literary award

The Kavanagh Fellowship is an Irish literary award given by the trustees of the estate of Katherine Kavanagh to an Irish poet in his or her middle years, who must be in need of financial assistance.

€20,000 is awarded annually; a sum that may be divided among multiple poets.

== Winners list ==
- 2004: Desmond O'Grady
- 2011: Mark Granier.
- 2013: Gearoid Mac Lochlain, Joseph Woods and Enda Wyley
- 2014: Rody Gorman, Michelle O'Sullivan, Paul Perry.
- 2016: Nell Regan
- 2017: Jean O'Brien
- 2018: Catherine Ann Cullen, Noel Duffy
- 2023: Afric McGlinchey, Judith Mok, David McLoghlin, Noel King
