= Mark Granier =

Irish writer and photographer

Mark Granier born in London, England, is an Irish poet and photographer based in Dublin, Ireland. Poetry Ireland Review describes Granier as, "a poet of individual poems," poems that are, "perfectly operating verbal machines, which are their own fulfillment, with everything concentrated on the final, sealing line."

== Biography ==
Mark Granier was born in London in 1957. He completed an MA in Poetry/Creative Writing with Lancaster University and has been teaching creative writing in University College Dublin for several years. He lives in Dublin with his wife and son.

He has published six poetry collections: Airborne (Salmon Poetry, 2001), The Sky Road (Salmon Poetry, 2007), Fade Street (Salt Publishing, 2010), Haunt (Salmon Poetry, 2015), Ghostlight: New & Selected Poems (Salmon Poetry, 2017) and Everything You Have Always Wanted to Know (Salmon Poetry, 2025). He received five Arts Council bursaries, in 2002, 2008, 2013, 2018 and 2021 (and a Covid 19 Response Award in 2020). Other awards include the Vincent Buckley Poetry Prize in 2004 and The Patrick and Katherine Kavanagh Poetry Fellowship in 2011 and 2016.

The Irish Times describes Granier's Fade Street, in which the title poem is a reflection on a Victorian era photograph, as "ekphrastic." In its review of Fade Street, Poetry Ireland Review, describes Granier as, "well-known for his visual sense."

Mark Granier's photography work includes portraits of some well-known writers and performers such as Allen Ginsberg and Jo Brand. Apart from furnishing the cover photography for his four poetry collections, he has done cover work for a number of publishers, including Faber & Faber, The O’Brien Press, Salmon Poetry, Poetry Ireland Review and The Stinging Fly. The literary/photographic journal Irish Pages published a portfolio of his work in 2011 and his photographs have regularly appeared in The Guardian Weekend Magazine and have been exhibited in two group shows in London (in The Oxo Gallery on The South Bank and The Guardian Offices). In 2012 he was awarded the jury prize in The Open House Photographic competition run by the Architecture Foundation. In 2015 his work was selected by Mark St. John Ellis (of nag Gallery, Dublin) to appear in an open submission competition/exhibition, Home, in the Municipal Gallery in The Lexicon Library in Dún Laoghaire. He was also awarded runner-up prize in this competition. His work has also been exhibited in the 2015 Royal Hibernian Academy annual exhibition in Dublin.

== Works ==
=== Poetry ===
- Airborne (Salmon, 2001)
- The Sky Road (Salmon, 2007)
- Fade Street (Salt, 2010)
- Haunt (Salmon, 2015)
- Ghostlight: New & Selected Poems (Salmon, 2017)
- Everything You Always Wanted To Know (Salmon, 2025)

=== Photography ===
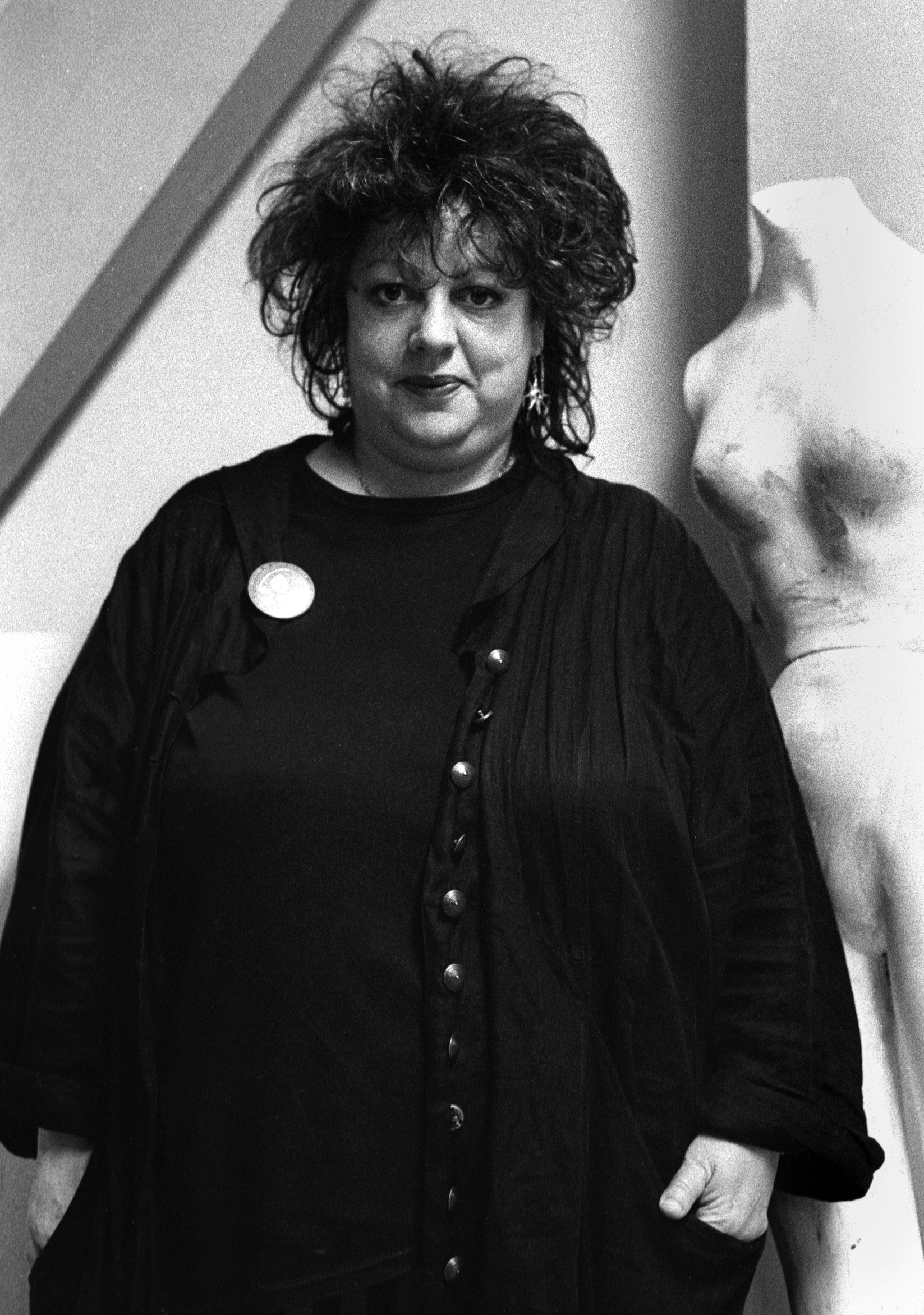
Jo Brand by Mark Granier
