= Michael Longley =

Northern Irish poet (1939–2025)

Michael Longley CBE
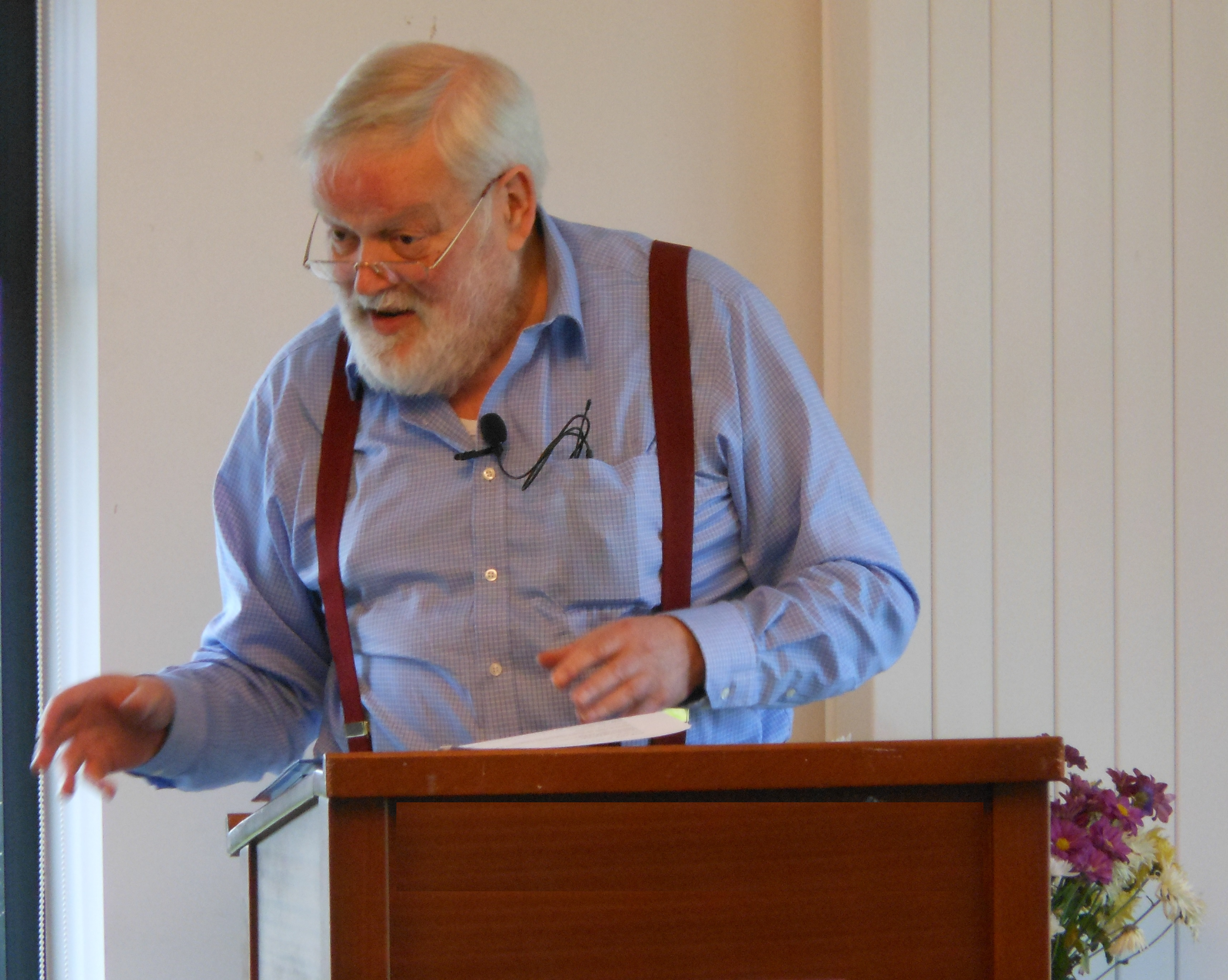
- Longley reading his poetry in 2012
- Born: 27 July 1939; Belfast, Northern Ireland
- Died: 22 January 2025 (aged 85)
- Education: Royal Belfast Academical Institution; Trinity College Dublin
- Writing career
- Notable awards: Whitbread Poetry Prize; T. S. Eliot Prize; Hawthornden Prize

Michael George Longley CBE (27 July 1939 – 22 January 2025) was a Northern Irish poet. In his later years Longley observed: "It's a mystery where poems come from. If I knew where poems came from I would go there ... When I write a poem I am moving into unknown territory and hoping to be surprised by some kind of redemptive eloquence to cast light into dark corners". Following his death, the President of Ireland, Michael D. Higgins, called Longley "a peerless poet".

== Life and career ==
The elder of twin boys, Michael Longley was born in Belfast, Northern Ireland, to parents Richard and Connie (née Longworth) from London; he had an elder sister, Wendy. Longley was educated at RBAI and subsequently read Classics at Trinity College Dublin (TCD), where he edited Icarus. He was the Ireland Professor of Poetry from 2007 to 2010, a cross-border academic post set up in 1998, previously held by John Montague, Nuala Ní Dhomhnaill and Paul Durcan. He was succeeded in 2010 by Harry Clifton. After teaching for several years in Dublin, London and Belfast, he was a director of the Arts Council of Northern Ireland 1970 to 1991. He was part of the Belfast Group of poets that included Seamus Heaney with whom he became close friends, Derek Mahon and Paul Muldoon.

His wife, Edna, is a critic on modern Irish and British poetry. They had three children, Rebecca, Daniel and Sarah. An atheist, Longley described himself as a "sentimental" disbeliever.

In 1994, Longley wrote his most famous poem, "Ceasefire". Composed in hope of a ceasefire between the IRA and loyalist forces, it was released only one day before one came about. The poem adapts a famous scene from the Iliad, where King Priam begs for the body of his son back from the warrior Achilles.

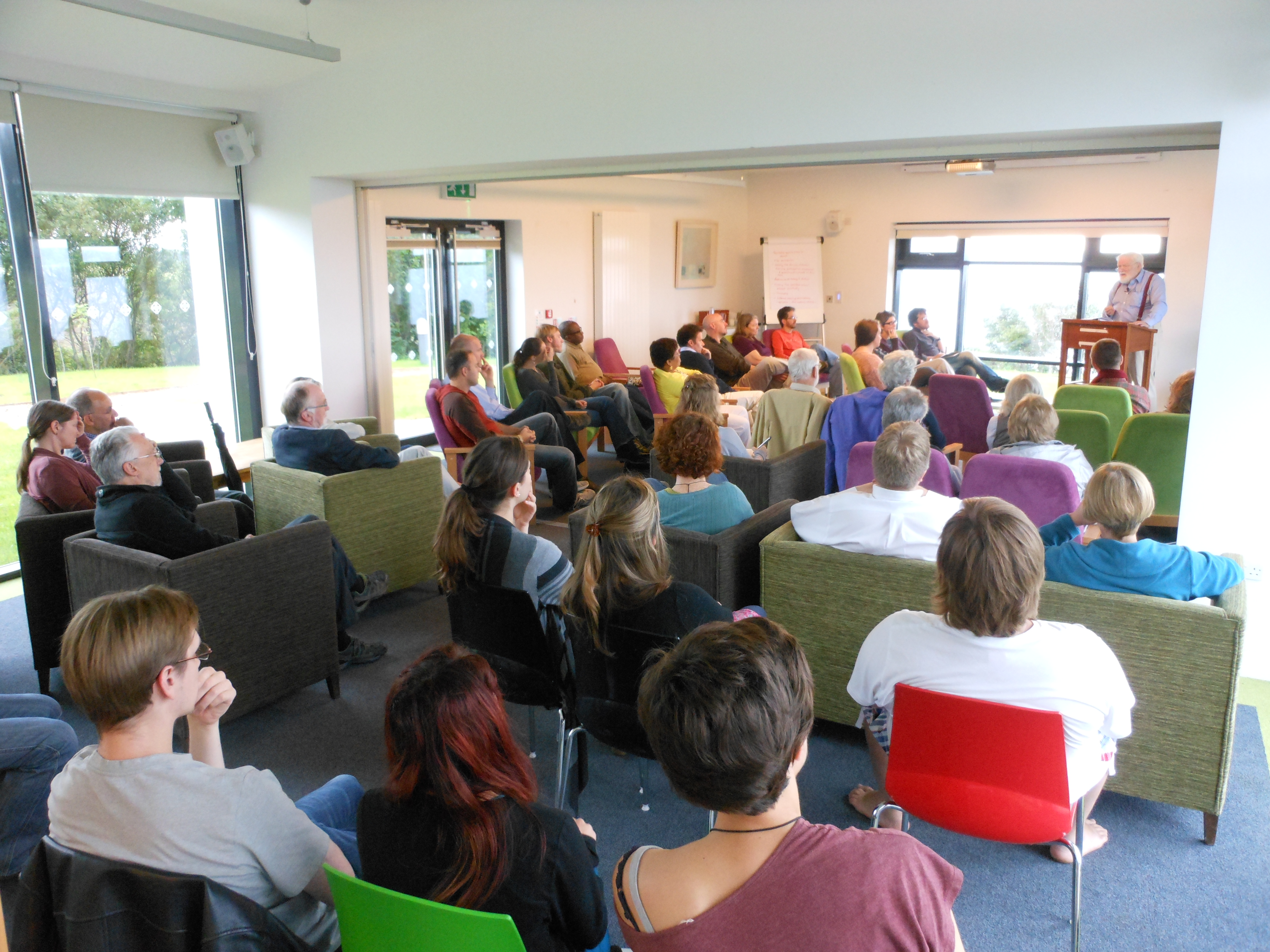
Longley reading his poetry at the Corrymeela Peace Center in Ballycastle, Northern Ireland, July 2012

In October 2002, Longley opposed a decision by Queen's University Belfast to end the teaching of Classics and urged the university's senate to take action. Citing Northern Ireland's recent troubled past, he asked: "Who can bring peace to people who are not civilised?"

On 14 January 2014, he participated in the BBC Radio 3 series The Essay – Letters to a Young Poet. Taking Rainer Maria Rilke's classic text Letters to a Young Poet as inspiration, leading poets wrote a letter to a protege. Longley provided readings of his poetry for the Irish Poetry Reading Archive (UCD).

His twin brother, Peter, died in 2013/14. Longley dedicated the second half of The Stairwell (2014), his tenth collection, to him.

Over 50 years, he spent much time in Carrigskeewaun, County Mayo, which inspired much of his poetry.

Longley died of complications from hip surgery on 22 January 2025, at the age of 85. His funeral took place at All Souls Church, Belfast, on 1 February 2025. During the service mourners, including President Michael D. Higgins, were told that he had entered "people's consciousness".

== List of works ==
=== Poetry: Main collections ===
- 1969: No Continuing City, London: Macmillan: New York: Dufour Editions
- 1973: An Exploded View, London: Victor Gollancz
- 1976: Man Lying on a Wall, London: Victor Gollancz; New York: Transatlantic Arts (1977)
- 1979: The Echo Gate, London: Secker & Warburg; New York: Random House
- 1991: Gorse Fires, London: Secker & Warburg; Winston-Salem, USA: Wake Forest University Press
- 1995: The Ghost Orchid, London: Jonathan Cape; Winston-Salem, USA: Wake Forest University Press (1996)
- 2000: The Weather in Japan, London: Jonathan Cape; Winston-Salem, USA: Wake Forest University Press
- 2004: Snow Water, London: Jonathan Cape; Winston-Salem, USA: Wake Forest University Press
- 2011: A Hundred Doors, London: Jonathan Cape; Winston-Salem, USA: Wake Forest University Press
- 2014: The Stairwell, London: Jonathan Cape; Winston-Salem, USA: Wake Forest University Press
- 2017: Angel Hill, London: Jonathan Cape; Winston-Salem, USA: Wake Forest University Press
- 2020: The Candlelight Master, London: Jonathan Cape; Winston-Salem, USA: Wake Forest University Press
- 2022: The Slain Birds, London: Jonathan Cape; Winston-Salem, USA: Wake Forest University Press

=== Poetry: Selected editions ===
- 1981: Selected Poems 1963–1980, Winston-Salem, USA: Wake Forest University Press
- 1985: Poems 1963–1983, Edinburgh: Salamander Press; Dublin: Gallery Press; Winston-Salem, USA: Wake Forest University Press (1987)
- 1998: Selected Poems, London: Jonathan Cape; Winston-Salem, USA: Wake Forest University Press (1999)
- 2006: Collected Poems, London: Jonathan Cape; Winston-Salem, USA: Wake Forest University Press (2007)
- 2024: Ash Keys: New Selected Poems, London: Jonathan Cape; Winston-Salem, USA: Wake Forest University Press

=== Limited editions and booklets (poetry and prose) ===
- 1965: Ten Poems, Belfast: Festival Publications
- 1968: Secret Marriages, Manchester: Phoenix Press
- 1972: Lares, Woodford Green, London: Poet & Printer
- 1975: Fishing in the Sky: Love Poems, London: Poet & Printer
- 1981: Patchwork, Dublin: The Gallery Press
- 1993: Baucis and Philemon: After Ovid, London: Poet & Printer
- 1994: Birds and Flowers: Poems, Edinburgh: Morning Star
- 1994: Tuppeny Stung: Autobiographical Chapters, Belfast: Lagan Press
- 1997: Ship of the Wind, Dublin: Poetry Ireland
- 1998: Broken Dishes, Newry, Northern Ireland: Abbey Press
- 1999: Out of the Cold, Newry, Northern Ireland: Abbey Press
- 2003: Cenotaph of Snow: Sixty Poems About War, London: Enitharmon Press
- 2005: The Rope-Makers, London: Enitharmon Press
- 2008: A Jovial Hullabaloo, London: Enitharmon Press
- 2015: One Wide Expanse, Dublin: University College Dublin Press
- 2015: Sea Asters, Rochdale, UK: Andrew J Moorhouse, Fine Press Poetry
- 2016: The Dipper's Range, Rochdale, UK: Andrew J Moorhouse, Fine Press Poetry
- 2016: Twelve Poems, Thame, Oxford: Clutag Press
- 2017: Songs for Dead Children: Poetry in Violent Times, London: Faber and Faber
- 2017: Sidelines: Selected Prose, London: Enitharmon Press
- 2019: Ghetto, Rochdale, UK: Andrew J Moorhouse, Fine Press Poetry
- 2020: Homer's Octopus, Rochdale, UK: Andrew J Moorhouse, Fine Press Poetry
- 2022: Metamorphoses, Rochdale, UK: Andrew J Moorhouse, Fine Press Poetry
- 2022: Canticle, Rochdale, UK: Andrew J Moorhouse, Fine Press Poetry
- 2024: Birds & Flowers, Rochdale, UK: Andrew J Moorhouse, Fine Press Poetry

North American editions of Longley's work are published by Wake Forest University Press.

== Awards and honours ==
Gorse Fires (1991) won the Whitbread Poetry Prize. The Weather in Japan (2000) won the T. S. Eliot Prize and the Hawthornden Prize. It also brought him the inaugural Yakamochi Medal in 2018. He received honorary doctorates from Queen's (1995) and Trinity (1999) and was the 2001 recipient of the Queen's Gold Medal for Poetry. Longley was appointed Commander of the Order of the British Empire (CBE) in the 2010 Birthday Honours.

Longley won a 2011 London Awards for Art and Performance. His collection A Hundred Doors won the Poetry Now Award in September 2012.

His 2014 collection, The Stairwell, won the 2015 International Griffin Poetry Prize. In 2015, he received the Ulster Tatler Lifetime Achievement Award. He was awarded the PEN Pinter Prize in 2017. The Chair of the judges, Don Paterson, said: "For decades now his effortlessly lyric and fluent poetry has been wholly suffused with the qualities of humanity, humility and compassion, never shying away from the moral complexity that comes from seeing both sides of an argument."

In 2015 Longley was elected a Freeman of the City of Belfast. In 2018, he was made an honorary fellow of Trinity. He was a fellow of the Royal Society of Literature and the Royal Hibernian Academy of Arts.

In autumn 2021, the School of English at Queen's University opened the Longley Room to honour the poet and his wife. The university also established the Michael Longley scholarship fund, offering two scholarships each year to poetry students of particular merit.

== See also ==
- List of Northern Irish writers
