= Peter Sirr =

Irish poet (born 1960)

Peter Sirr (born 1960) is an Irish poet, born in Waterford, Ireland. He lives in Dublin where he works as a freelance writer and translator.

== Life ==
Peter Sirr was born in Waterford in 1960, before moving to Dublin with his family as a child.

Sirr was educated at Trinity College Dublin. He won the Patrick Kavanagh Poetry Award in 1982, and the poetry prize at Listowel Writers' Week in 1983. He has divided much of his time between Ireland, Italy, and Holland, though he has now settled back in Dublin. He was director of the Irish Writers' Centre from 1991 to 2002, and was editor of Poetry Ireland Review from 2003 to 2007. He was on the shortlist twice for the Poetry Now Award for his collection Nonetheless in 2005 and for The Thing Is in 2010. In 2011, he won the Michael Hartnett Award for The Thing Is.

He has written radio plays and a novel for children, Black Wreath.

Sirr is currently a freelance writer and translator. He lectures part-time at Trinity College Dublin.

A member of Aosdána, he lives in Dublin with his wife Enda Wyley and their daughter.

== Poetry books ==
- Marginal Zones (Gallery Press 1984)
- Talk, Talk (Gallery Press 1987)
- Ways of Falling (Gallery Press 1991)
- The Ledger of Fruitful Exchange (Gallery Press 1995)
- Bring Everything (Gallery Press 2000)
- Nonetheless (Gallery Press 2004)
- Selected Poems 1982-2004 (Gallery Press 2004); Wake Forest University Press, 2005
- The Thing Is (Gallery Press 2009)
- The Rooms (Gallery Press 2014)
- The Gravity Wave (Gallery Press 2019)
- The Swerve (Gallery Press 2023)

== Books for children ==
- Black Wreath (O'Brien Press 2014)
