= Brendan Kennelly =

Irish poet and novelist (1936–2021)

- Born: 17 April 1936; Ballylongford, County Kerry, Ireland
- Died: 17 October 2021 (aged 85); Listowel, County Kerry, Ireland
- Education: Trinity College Dublin; Leeds University
- Occupations: Writer, professor, translator
- Spouse: Margaret O'Brien (m. 1969, divorced)
- Children: Daughter, Doodle Kennelly
- Relatives: Three granddaughters: Meg, Hannah and Grace
- Writing career
- Subject: Oliver Cromwell
- Notable works: "Poetry My Arse" "Book of Judas" "Cromwell" "Begin" "Poem from a three-year old"
- Notable awards: Irish PEN Award; 2010

Timothy Brendan Kennelly (17 April 1936 – 17 October 2021), usually known as Brendan Kennelly, was an Irish poet and novelist. He was Professor of Modern Literature at Trinity College Dublin until 2005. Following his retirement he was a professor emeritus at Trinity College.

== Early life ==
Kennelly was born in Ballylongford, County Kerry, on 17 April 1936. He was one of eight children of Tim Kennelly and Bridie (Ahern). His father worked as a publican and garage proprietor; his mother was a nurse. Kennelly was educated at the inter-denominational St. Ita's College, Tarbert, County Kerry. He was then awarded a scholarship to study English and French at Trinity College Dublin. There he was editor of Icarus and captained the Trinity Gaelic Football Club. He graduated from Trinity in 1961 with first-class honours, before obtaining a Doctor of Philosophy there in 1967. He also studied at Leeds University for one year under the tutelage of Norman Jeffares. He became a fellow of Trinity College Dublin in 1967, and a senior fellow in 1989.

== Poetry ==
Kennelly's poetry can be scabrous, down-to-earth, and colloquial. He avoided intellectual pretension and literary posturing, and his attitude to poetic language could be summed up in the title of one of his epic poems, "Poetry my Arse". Another long (400-page) epic poem, "The Book of Judas", published in 1991, topped the Irish best-seller list.

A prolific and fluent writer, there are more than fifty volumes of poetry to his credit, including My Dark Fathers (1964), Collection One: Getting Up Early (1966), Good Souls to Survive (1967), Dream of a Black Fox (1968), Love Cry (1972), The Voices (1973), Shelley in Dublin (1974), A Kind of Trust (1975), Islandman (1977), A Small Light (1979), and The House That Jack Didn't Build (1982).

Kennelly edited several other anthologies, including "Between Innocence and Peace: Favourite Poems of Ireland" (1993), "Ireland's Women: Writings Past and Present, with Katie Donovan and A. Norman Jeffares" (1994), and "Dublines," with Katie Donovan (1995). He also authored two novels, "The Crooked Cross" (1963) and "The Florentines" (1967), and three plays in a Greek Trilogy, Antigone, Medea, and The Trojan Women.

Kennelly was an Irish language speaker, and translated Irish poems in "A Drinking Cup" (1970) and "Mary" (Dublin 1987). A selection of his collected translations was published as "Love of Ireland: Poems from the Irish" (1989).

== Style ==
Language was important in Kennelly's work – in particular the vernacular of the small and isolated communities in North Kerry where he grew up, and of the Dublin streets and pubs where he became both roamer and raconteur for many years. His language is also grounded in the Irish-language poetic tradition, oral and written, which can be both satirical and salacious in its approach to human follies.

Regarding the oral tradition, Kennelly was a great reciter of verse with tremendous command and the rare ability to recall extended poems by memory, both his own work and others, and recite them on call verbatim. He commented on his use of language: "Poetry is an attempt to cut through the effects of deadening familiarity … to reveal that inner sparkle."

== Personal life ==
Kennelly married Margaret (Peggy) O'Brien in 1969. They were colleagues at the time, and she taught at English at the University of Massachusetts, Amherst at the time of his death. Together, they had one child, Kristen “Doodle” Kennelly. They lived in Sandymount in Dublin before getting divorced, which Kennelly attributed to his overindulgence in alcohol. He ultimately became teetotal in about 1985. Doodle died in April 2021, six months before her father.

Kennelly died at the age of 85 years on 17 October 2021, at a care home in Listowel, County Kerry where he lived in the two years prior to his death.

== Awards and honours ==
- 1967 Æ Memorial Prize
- 1988 Critics Special Harvey's Award
- 1996 IMPAC International Dublin Literary Award
- 1999 American Ireland Fund Literary Award
- 2003 The Ireland Funds of France Wild Geese Award
- 2010 Irish PEN Award

== List of works ==
- Cast a Cold Eye (1959) with Rudi Holzapfel
- The Rain, the Moon (1961) with Rudi Holzapfel
- The Dark About Our Loves (1962) Rudi Holzapfel
- Green Townlands (1963) Rudi Holzapfel
- Let Fall No Burning Leaf (1963)
- The Crooked Cross (1963) novel; ISBN 9780900372780
- My Dark Fathers (1964)
- Up and at It (1965)
- Collection One: Getting Up Early (1966)
- Good Souls to Survive (1967)
- The Florentines (1967) novel
- Dream of a Black Fox (1968) ISBN 9780900372032
- Selected Poems (1969)
- A Drinking Cup, Poems from the Irish (1970) ISBN 9780900372261
- The Penguin Book of Irish Verse (1970, 1981) editor
- Bread (1971) ISBN 9780902996007
- Love Cry (1972) ISBN 9780900372711
- Salvation, The Stranger (1972) ISBN 9780902996106
- The Voices (1973) ISBN 9780950018331
- Shelley in Dublin (1974)
- A Kind of Trust (1975) ISBN 9780902996298
- New and Selected Poems (1976) ISBN 9780902996434
- The Boats Are Home (Gallery Press, 1980) ISBN 9780904011098
- Moloney Up and at It (Mercier Press, 1984) ISBN 9780853427209
- Cromwell (Beaver Row Press, 1983; Bloodaxe Books, 1987) ISBN 9781852240264
- Mary, from the Irish of Muireadach Albanach Ó Dálaigh (Aisling Press, 1987)
- Landmarks of Irish Drama (Methuen, 1988) ISBN 9780413402905
- Love of Ireland: Poems from the Irish (Mercier Press, 1989) [anthology] ISBN 9780853428886
- A Time for Voices: Selected Poems 1960–1990 (Bloodaxe Books, 1990) ISBN 9781852240974
- Euripides' Medea (Bloodaxe Books, 1991) ISBN 9781852241889
- The Book of Judas (Bloodaxe Books, 1991) ISBN 9781852241704
- Breathing Spaces: Early Poems (Bloodaxe Books, 1992) ISBN 9781852242114
- Euripides' The Trojan Women (Bloodaxe Books, 1993) ISBN 9781852242404
- Journey into Joy: Selected Prose, ed. Åke Persson (Bloodaxe Books, 1994) ISBN 9781852242091
- Between Innocence and Peace: Favourite Poems of Ireland (Mercier Press, 1994) [anthology] ISBN 9781856350402
- Poetry My Arse (Bloodaxe Books, 1995) ISBN 9781852243227
- Dublines, with Katie Donovan (Bloodaxe Books, 1996) [anthology] ISBN 9781852242565
- Sophocles' Antigone: a new version (Bloodaxe Books, 1996) ISBN 9781852243647
- Lorca: Blood Wedding (Bloodaxe Books, 1996) ISBN 9781852243548
- The Man Made of Rain (Bloodaxe Books, 1998) ISBN 9781852244545
- The Singing Tree (Abbey Press, 1998) ISBN 9781901617092
- Begin (Bloodaxe Books, 1999) ISBN 9781852244972
- Glimpses (Bloodaxe Books, 2001) ISBN 9781852245757
- The Little Book of Judas (Bloodaxe Books, 2002) ISBN 9781852245849
- Martial Art (Bloodaxe Books, 2003) ISBN 9781852246273 [versions of Martial]
- Familiar Strangers: New & Selected Poems (Bloodaxe Books, 2004) ISBN 9781852246624
- Now (Bloodaxe Books, 2006) ISBN 9781852247485
- When Then Is Now: Three Greek Tragedies (Bloodaxe Books, 2006) ISBN 9781852247430 [versions of Sophocles' Antigone and Euripides' Medea and The Trojan Women]
- Reservoir Voices (Bloodaxe Books, 2009) ISBN 9781852248369
- The Essential Brendan Kennelly: Selected Poems (Bloodaxe Books, UK & Ireland, 2011, Wake Forest University Press, USA, 2011) ISBN 9781930630574
- Guff (Bloodaxe Books, 2013) ISBN 9781852249830
