= Edward F. O'Dwyer =

American judge

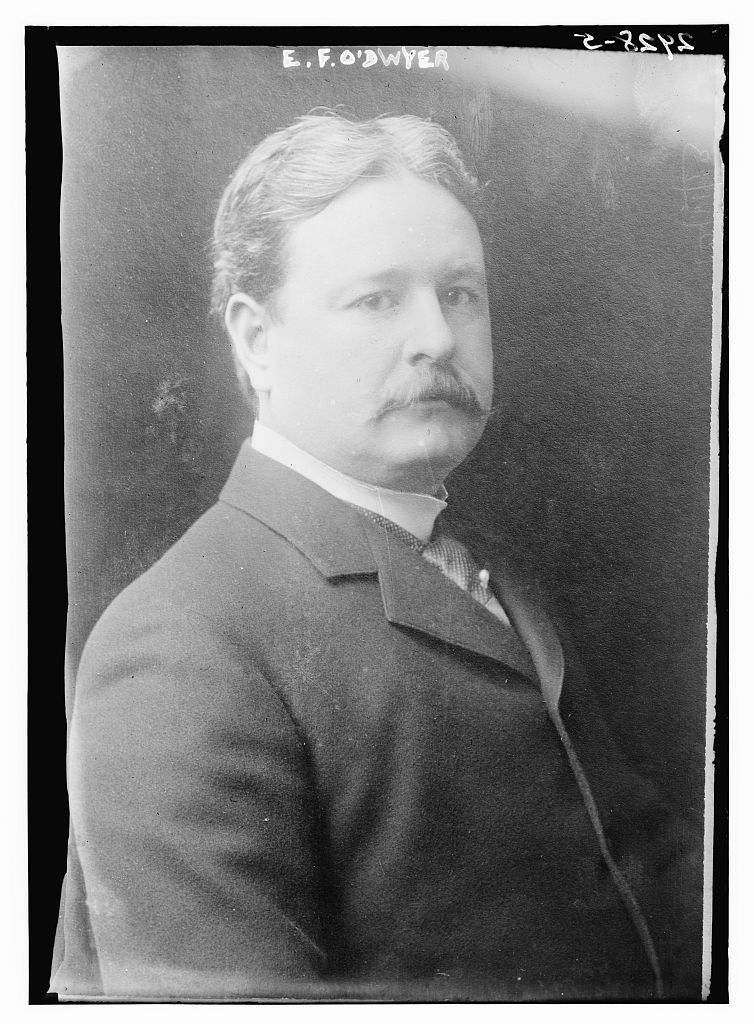

Edward F. O'Dwyer (1860–1922) was Chief Justice of the New York City court and president of the National Democratic Club.
