= Conor O'Callaghan (poet) =

Irish poet

Conor O'Callaghan (born 1968) is an Irish novelist and poet.

== Biography ==
O'Callaghan was born in Newry in 1968 and grew up in Dundalk.

His first volume of poetry, The History of Rain, was published in 1993; this volume won the Patrick Kavanagh award.

His first novel, Nothing on Earth, was published to acclaim in 2016 and was shortlisted for the Kerry Group Irish Novel of the Year. His second novel, We Are Not in the World, appeared in February 2021. He has also published five collections of poetry. His memoir Red Mist: Roy Keane and the Football Civil War (2004) is an account of Roy Keane's departure from the Republic of Ireland's 2002 World Cup squad.

O'Callaghan is a former co-holder of the Heimbold Chair of Irish Studies at Villanova University. In 2026 he is a senior lecturer at Lancaster University.

He was awarded the 2007 Bess Hokin prize by Poetry magazine.

He lives in Sheffield with his wife, Mary Peace, a scholar of eighteenth-century literature.

== Fiction ==
- Nothing on Earth (Doubleday, 2016)
- We Are Not in the World (Doubleday, 2021)

== Poetry ==
- The History of Rain (Gallery Press, 1993)
- Seatown (Gallery Press, 1999)
- Fiction (Gallery Press, 2005)
- The Server Room (Smithereens Press, 2013)
- The Sun King (Gallery Press, 2013)
- The Wake Forest Series of Irish Poetry (Volume III) (2013) (editor)
- Live Streaming (Gallery Press, 2017)

== Non-fiction ==
- Red Mist: Roy Keane and the Football Civil War (Bloomsbury, 2004)
