= Moya Cannon =

Irish poet

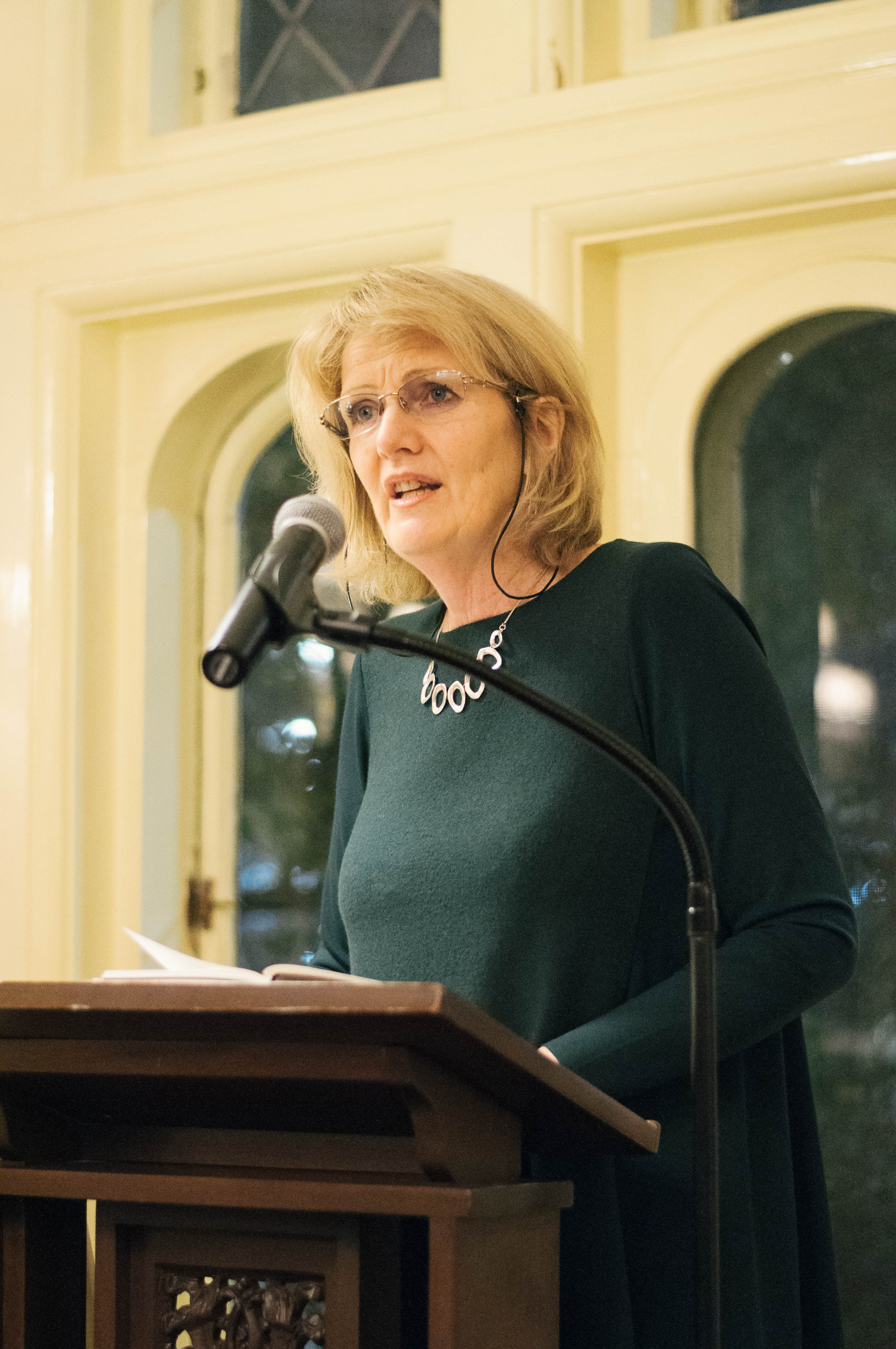
- Irish Poet Moya Cannon at BU Castle. Tuesday, October 10, 2015.
- Born: 1956 (age 69–70); Dunfanaghy, County Donegal, Ireland
- Education: University College Dublin; Corpus Christi College, Cambridge
- Occupations: Poet, writer
- Writing career
- Notable works: Collected Poems; Bunting's Honey
- Website: www.moyacannon.ie

Moya Cannon (born 1956) is an Irish writer and poet with seven published collections, the most recent being Bunting's Honey (Carcanet Press, 2021).

== Life ==
Born and raised as one of six children in Dunfanaghy, County Donegal, Ireland, to teacher parents, Cannon moved to Galway in 1983, where she has spent most of her adult life in Galway, and now lives in Dublin. She studied History and Politics (B.A.) at University College Dublin and International Relations (MPhil) at Corpus Christi College, Cambridge. She then moved to Galway where she worked as a teacher. For several years she taught in a special school for adolescent traveller children. In addition, she taught courses in creative writing at the National University of Ireland, Galway and was co-director of The International Writers' Course at NUIG.

Cannon's first published collection Oar (Salmon Poetry, 1990) won the 1991 Brendan Behan Memorial Award. It was later republished by Poolbeg Press in 1994, and by Gallery Press in 2000, following the latter's publication of The Parchment Boat in 1997. In her poems, history, archaeology, prehistoric art, geology and music figure as gateways to a deeper understanding of our relationship with the earth and with our past. Migration is a core theme, the migrations of birds, of people, of culture.

She has been invited to read in Ireland, Europe, the Americas (North and South), Japan and India. Bilingual selections of her work have been published in Spanish, Portuguese, and German. Winter Birds, a limited edition art book with ink drawings by Sabine Springer, was published in 2005. Winter Birds and Other Poems, a bilingual selection of Cannon's poems with Spanish translations by Jorge Fondebrider, then appeared in 2015.

A recipient of the O'Shaughnessy Award from the University of St. Thomas, St Paul, Minnesota in 2001; she was Heimbold Professor of Irish Studies at Villanova University in 2011. She has been editor of Poetry Ireland Review and is a member of Aosdána.

Published by Carcanet in 2011, her fourth collection Handswas nominated for the 2012 Irish Times/Poetry Now Award. Cannon published her sixth collection, Donegal Tarantella in 2019, praised for its knowledgeable, affectionate and "unerring pared back poems", followed by Collected Poems in 2021, which compiled over three decades of work. Carcanet published Cannon's seventh collection Bunting's Honey in 2025. Praised for being "a landscape of intimate knowledge", it was among Guardian's "best recent poetry" collections, and was a Poetry Book Society Recommendation. Bunting's Honey was partly written during a residency in Paris in 2024.

== Bibliography ==
- Bunting's Honey (Carcanet Press, 2025) ISBN 9781800174894
- Collected Poems (Carcanet, 2021) ISBN 9781800170322
- Donegal Tarantella (Carcanet, 2019) ISBN 9781784107871
- Keats Lives (Carcanet, 2015) ISBN 9781784100605
- Hands (Carcanet, 2011) ISBN 9781847771421
- Carrying the Songs (Carcanet, 2007) ISBN 9781857549225
- Winter Birds (Traffic Street Press, 2005)
- The Parchment Boat (Gallery Press, 1997) ISBN 9781852352011
- Oar (Salmon Poetry, 1990) ISBN 9780948339486
  - Revisions:
  1. Oar (Poolbeg Press, 1994) ISBN 9781897648247
  2. Oar (Gallery Press, 2000) ISBN 9781852352639)

=== Translations ===
- Dos Poetas Irlandesas (Olifante, 2018) ISBN 9788494830280
- Ein Privates Land, German (Offends Feld, 2017) ISBN 9783744875233
- Melodias Migratorias (Encrenca, 2017) ISBN 9788568601099
- Aves De Invierno Y Otros Poemas, Spanish (Pre-Textos, 2015) ISBN 9788416453269
