= Harry Clifton (poet) =

Irish poet (born 1952)

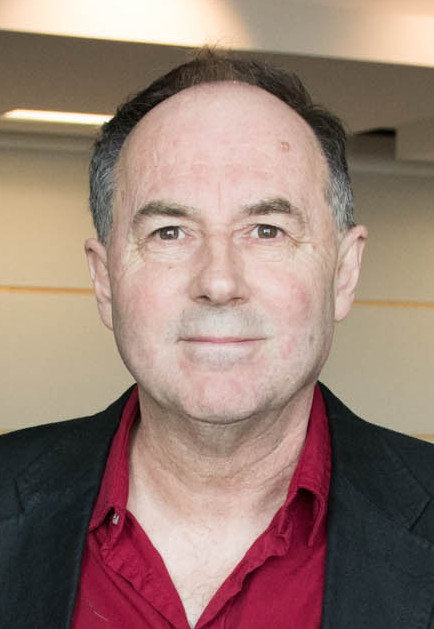
- Clifton in 2017
- Born: 1952 (age 73–74); Dublin, Ireland
- Education: Blackrock College; University College Dublin
- Occupation: Poet
- Spouse: Deirdre Madden
- Writing career
- Notable awards: Patrick Kavanagh Poetry Award (1981); Poetry Now Award (2008)

Harry Clifton (born 1952) is an Irish poet.

== Biography ==
Clifton was born in Dublin, where he was educated at Blackrock College and University College, Dublin. He has three younger brothers and two sisters.

After graduating, Clifton began an extended period of travel outside of Ireland. Many of his experiences from this time had a major influence on his poetry because he believes the true home of the poet is 'not in a place, but in the language itself'.

He has lived in places throughout Europe, Africa and Asia. He lectured at a teacher training college in Nigeria in the early 1970s. He worked as an aid administrator in Thailand for Indo-Chinese refugees in the 1980s. He lived in Italy's Abruzzi Mountains, Switzerland, England and Germany before settling in Paris for ten years.

He was poet-in-residence at the Frost Place in New Hampshire, an International Fellow at the University of Iowa, and a representative for Ireland at the International Writing Program in Iowa. He has held many teaching positions at universities, including Bremen and Bordeaux in France, and Trinity College Dublin and University College Dublin, in Ireland. In 2021, he was made an honorary fellow of Trinity College Dublin.

He now lives in Dublin with his wife, Irish novelist Deirdre Madden, and teaches at University College Dublin.

== Work ==
He has published twelve books of poetry, with work from his first four collections included in The Desert Route: Selected Poems 1973-88, published in 1992 by the Gallery Press in Ireland and Bloodaxe Books in Britain, with a foreword by Derek Mahon. His latest titles are The Winter Sleep of Captain Lemass (2012), The Holding Centre: Selected Poems 1974-2004 (2014), Portobello Sonnets (2017), and Herod's Dispensations (2019), all published by Bloodaxe Books in Britain and Ireland, and by Wake Forest University Press in the United States. A new collection, Gone Self Storm, was published by both publishers in 2023.

He wrote On the Spine of Italy: A Year in the Abruzzi (Macmillan, 1999), a prose work based on the year he spent in Italy. He recorded his life in Paris in Secular Eden: Paris Notebooks 1994–2004 (Wake Forest University Press, 2007).

His poems have been translated into several European languages, with a French translation of selected poems, Le Canto d'Ulysse, published in 1996. He also published a book of stories, Berkeley's Telephone & Other Fictions (Lilliput Press, 2000).

== Critical reception ==
In his foreword to Harry Clifton's first volume of selected poems, The Desert Route (1992), Derek Mahon wrote: 'The poet has taken the world as his province... Quietly, without self-assertion, he [Clifton] has set himself to work in the highest registers. There must be three things in combination, I would suggest, before the poetry can happen: soul, song and formal necessity. Clifton has all three; he has chosen well from his four volumes; and this Selected Poems will place him among the poets who matter'.

Reviewing Secular Eden (2007) in The Irish Times, Fintan O'Toole wrote of Clifton's work: 'His is a universe of aftermaths, hauntings and returns, in which even God...dreams of becoming flesh again', asserting that his book 'captures an Irish voice that is utterly contemporary in its restless movement through time and space'.

Colm Tóibín, also writing in The Irish Times, wrote of The Winter Sleep of Captain Lemass (2012): 'There are moments when you hold your breath... and you sit up in pure delight... there are a number of poems in this book that will be read as long as any poems are read anywhere... The last poem, "Oweniny, Upper Reaches", filled with soft, haunting cadences and strange, ambiguous musings on solitude, memory and the meaning of things, is a masterpiece.'

Commenting on Clifton's work as a whole, C.K. Williams wrote: 'There is so much history in Harry Clifton's poems, so much geography, landscape, cityscape, repeopled precincts of the imagination, so much human drama and comedy; so many people, mythic, unlikely and hauntingly real. And all of it is limned with a masterful formal dexterity and an apparently limitless cultural curiosity.'

== Awards ==
- 1981 : Patrick Kavanagh Poetry Award
- 2008 : Irish Times Poetry Now Award for Secular Eden
- 2012 : shortlisted for Irish Times Poetry Now Award for The Winter Sleep of Captain Lemass
- 2010-2013: Fifth Ireland Professor of Poetry
- member of Aosdána.

== Publications ==
=== Poetry ===
- The Walls of Carthage, Dublin: The Gallery Press, 1977
- The Office of the Salt Merchant, Dublin: The Gallery Press, 1979
- Comparative Lives, Dublin: The Gallery Press, 1982 ISBN 090401133X
- The Liberal Cage, Oldcastle, Co. Meath: The Gallery Press, 1988 ISBN 185235027X
- The Desert Route: Selected Poems 1973-1988, Oldcastle, Co. Meath: The Gallery Press, 1992 ISBN 1852350938; Newcastle upon Tyne: Bloodaxe Books, 1992 ISBN 1852241756;
- Night Train Through the Brenner, Oldcastle, Co. Meath: The Gallery Press, 1994 ISBN 1852351233
- Le Canto d'Ulysse, ed. Nicole Ollier with various translators, Bordeaux: Presses Universitaires de Bordeaux, 1996 ISBN 9782867811753
- Secular Eden: Paris Notebooks 1994-2004, Winston-Salem, NC: Wake Forest University Press, 2007 ISBN 9781930630376
- The Winter Sleep of Captain Lemass, Tarset: Bloodaxe Books, 2012 ISBN 9781852249717; Winston-Salem, NC: Wake Forest University Press, 2012 ISBN 9781930630604
- The Holding Centre: Selected Poems 1974-2004, Tarset: Bloodaxe Books, 2014 ISBN 9781852249717; Winston-Salem, NC: Wake Forest University Press, 2012 ISBN 9781930630666
- Portobello Sonnets, Winston-Salem, NC: Wake Forest University Press, 2012 ISBN 9781930630796; Hexham: Bloodaxe Books, 2017 ISBN 9781780373478
- Herod's Dispensations, Winston-Salem, NC: Wake Forest University Press, 2019 ISBN 9781930630871; Hexham: Bloodaxe Books, 2019 ISBN 9781780374512
- Gone Self Storm, Winston-Salem, NC: Wake Forest University Press, 2023 ISBN 9781943667062; Hexham: Bloodaxe Books, 2023 ISBN 9781780374536

=== Fiction ===
- Berkeley's Telephone & Other Fictions, Dublin: Lilliput Press, 2000 ISBN 9781901866506

=== Non-fiction ===
- On the Spine of Italy: A Year in the Abruzzi, London: Macmillan, 1999 ISBN 978-0333746196
