= Rory Brennan (poet) =

Irish poet

Rory Brennan (born 1945) is an Irish poet, born in Westport, County Mayo. He has worked as a lecturer in Communications at Dublin City University Business School; and also as a presenter and programme-maker in the Education Department of RTÉ Radio. He was Secretary (Director) of Poetry Ireland in the 1980s.

== Poetry Books ==
- Dancing with Luck, The American University Paris, 2016
- Sky Lights, Luces Del Cielo, The Aegean Centre Press, 2012
- The Wind Messages, A chapbook, 1986
- The Old in Rapallo, Salmon Press, 1997.
- The Walking Wounded, Dedalus Press, 1985.
- The Sea on Fire, Dolmen Press, 1978
