= Sinéad Morrissey =

Northern Irish poet (born 1972)

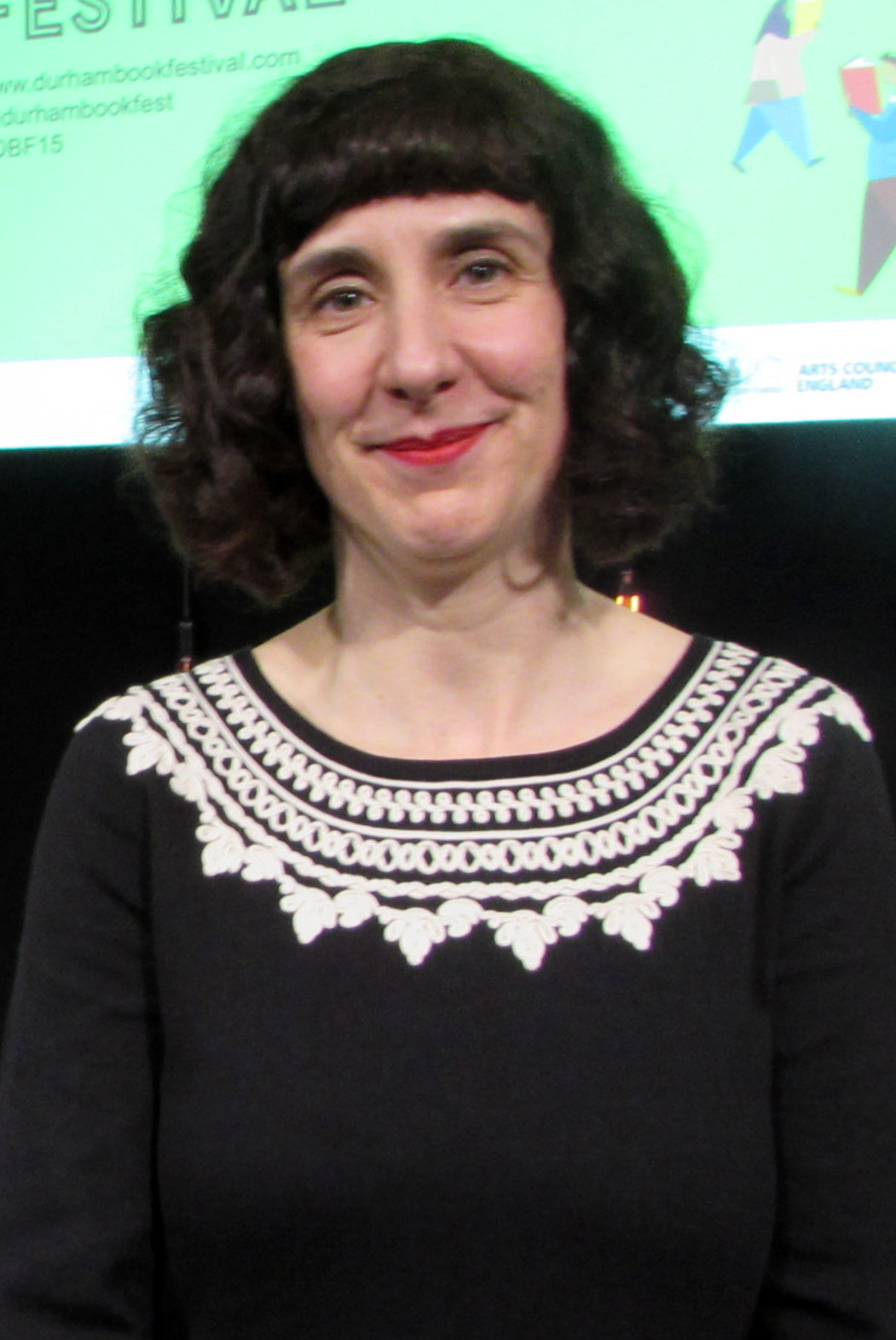
- Durham Book Festival in 2015
- Born: 24 April 1972 (age 54) Portadown, County Armagh
- Occupation: Poet
- Notable works: Parallax (2013)
- Notable awards: Poetry Now Award (2010); T. S. Eliot Prize (2014); Forward Prize (2017)

Sinéad Morrissey (born 24 April 1972 in Portadown, County Armagh) is a Northern Irish poet. In January 2014 she won the T. S. Eliot Prize for her fifth collection Parallax and in 2017 she won the Forward Prize for Poetry for her sixth collection On Balance. In 2024, she was the recipient of the Seamus Heaney Award (Japan). Her memoir, Among Communists, was published by Carcanet Press in March 2026.

== Life ==
In my dream the dead have arrived
to wash the windows of my house.
There are no blinds to shut them out with.

The clouds above the Lough are stacked
like the clouds are stacked above Delft.
They have the glutted look of clouds over water.

The heads of the dead are huge. I wonder
if it’s my son they’re after, his
effortless breath, his ribbon of years ─

but he sleeps on unregarded in his cot,
inured, it would seem, quite naturally
to the sluicing and battering and pairing back of glass

that delivers this shining exterior …

— excerpt from "Through the Square Window"

Raised in Belfast, she was educated at Trinity College, Dublin, where she took BA and PhD degrees. After periods living in Japan and New Zealand she now lives in Newcastle. She was appointed writer-in-residence and then Reader in Creative Writing followed by Professor of Creative Writing at Queen's University, Belfast, where she was also assistant director of the Seamus Heaney Centre. In 2016 she was appointed Professor of Creative Writing at the University of Newcastle. Morrissey has two children.

== Works ==
She has published six collections of poetry: There Was Fire in Vancouver (1996), Between Here and There (2001), The State of the Prisons (2005), Through the Square Window (2009), and Parallax (2013), the second, third and fourth of which were shortlisted for the T. S. Eliot Prize. In 2017 she published her sixth collection On Balance, which was awarded the Forward Prize for Poetry.

== Awards and honours ==
She won the Patrick Kavanagh Poetry Award in 1990. Her collection, The State of the Prisons, was shortlisted for the Poetry Now Award in 2006. The same collection won the Michael Hartnett Poetry Prize in 2005. In November 2007, she received a Lannan Foundation Fellowship for "distinctive literary merit and for demonstrating potential for continued outstanding work". Her poem "Through the Square Window" won first prize in the 2007 British National Poetry Competition. Her collection, Through the Square Window, won the Poetry Now Award for 2010.

In January 2014 Morrissey won the T. S. Eliot Prize for her fifth collection Parallax. The chair of the judging panel, Ian Duhig, remarked that the collection was 'politically, historically and personally ambitious, expressed in beautifully turned language, her book is as many-angled and any-angled as its title suggests.' Soon after, she was appointed the inaugural Belfast Poet Laureate, a position she held from 2014.

In September 2017 Morrissey's sixth collection On Balance was awarded the Forward Poetry Prize for Best Collection. In 2019 she was a contributor to A New Divan: A Lyrical Dialogue between East and West (Gingko Library).

Morrissey was elected a Fellow of the Royal Society of Literature in 2019. In 2020, she won the European Poet of Freedom Award (for On Balance). Most recently, in 2024, she won the Seamus Heaney Award in Japan.

== Bibliography ==
- There Was Fire in Vancouver (Carcanet Press, 1996)
- Between Here and There (Carcanet Press, 2001)
- The State of the Prisons (Carcanet Press, 2005)
- Through the Square Window (Carcanet Press, 2009)
- Parallax: And Selected Poems (Carcanet Press, 2013)
- On Balance (Carcanet Press, 2017)
- Among Communists (Carcanet Press, 2026)

== Pamphlets and Limited Editions ==
- The Italian Chapel - (Metal engravings by Maribel Mas. Published by Andrew J Moorhouse, Fine Press Poetry, 2019)

== Memoir ==
- Among Communists, Carcanet Press, 2026. ISBN 978-1800174061

== See also ==
- List of Northern Irish writers
