= Caitriona O'Reilly =

Irish poet and critic

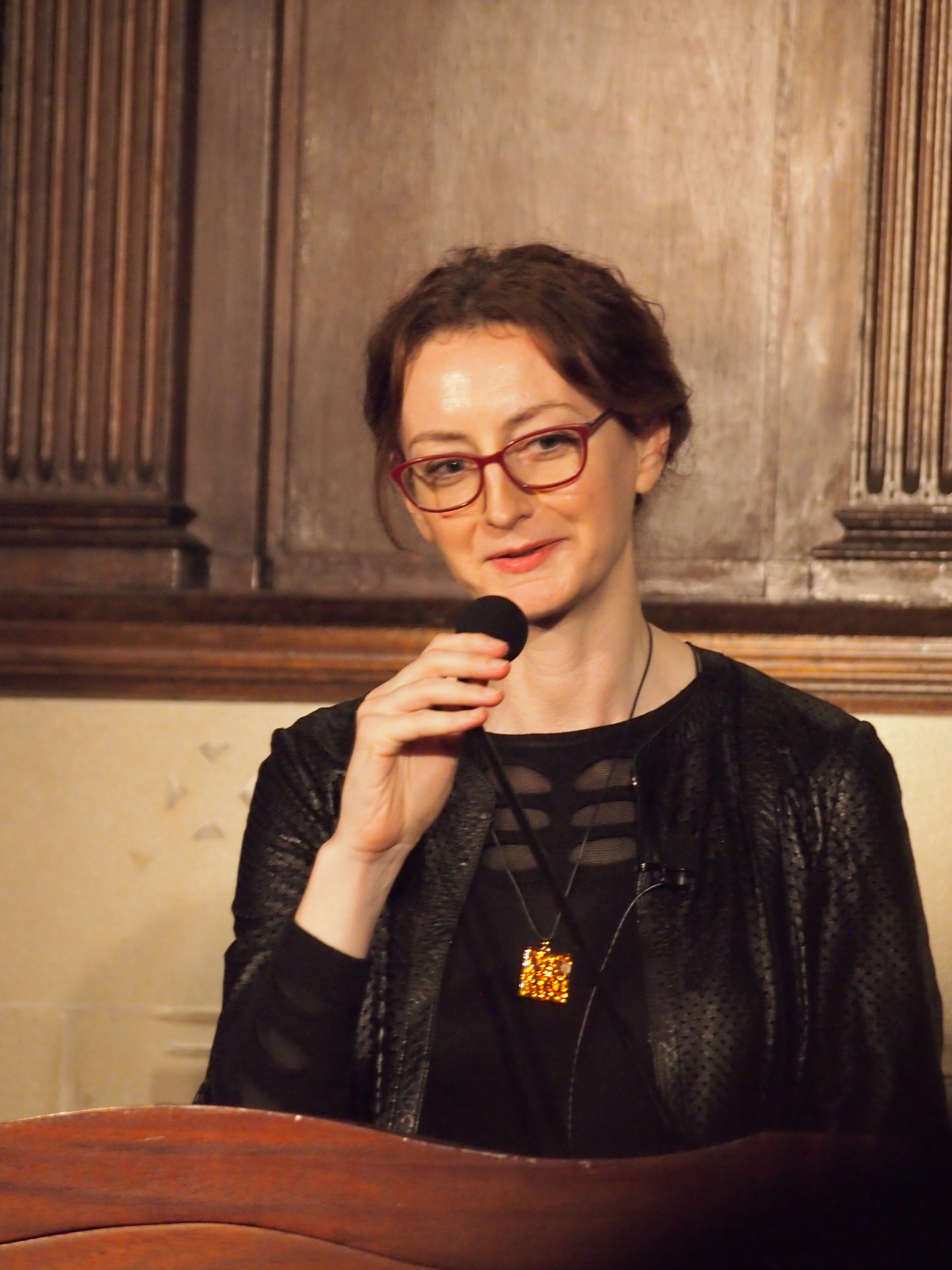
- Education: Trinity College, Dublin
- Writing career
- Genre: Poetry
- Notable awards: Rooney Prize for Irish Literature, Irish Times Poetry Now Award

Caitríona O'Reilly (born 1973) is an Irish poet and critic.

== Life ==
O’Reilly was born in Dublin and grew up in Dublin and Wicklow.

She earned BA and PhD degrees in Archaeology and English at Trinity College, Dublin, where she was awarded a PhD on American poetry, and was awarded the Rooney Prize for Irish Literature for her poetry collection, The Nowhere Birds (2001, Bloodaxe); she has also held the Harper-Wood Studentship from St John's College, Cambridge. She is the co-author (with David Wheatley) of a chapbook, Three-Legged Dog (Wild Honey Press, 2002); her second collection, The Sea Cabinet, followed in 2006. Her poetry can also be found in The Wake Forest Irish Poetry Series Vol.1.

She is a widely published critic, has written for BBC Radio 4, translated from the Galician of María do Cebreiro, and published some fiction. She was a contributing editor of the Irish poetry journal Metre; she has collaborated with artist Isabel Nolan and in 2008 was named editor of Poetry Ireland Review. A third collection, Geis, was published by Bloodaxe and Wake Forest University Press in 2015.

She has worked as 'Poet in Residence' at Wake Forest University and is a lecturer in Creative Writing at King's College, London, having been previously an associate lecturer at Sheffield Hallam University. She lives in Lincoln.

The Sea Cabinet was shortlisted for the Irish Times Poetry Now Award in 2007; Geis won the Irish Times Poetry Now Award in 2016.

== Works ==
- The Nowhere Birds, Bloodaxe, 2001, ISBN 9781852245603
- The Sea Cabinet, Bloodaxe Books, 2006, ISBN 9781852247058
- Geis, Bloodaxe Books, 2015, ISBN 9781780371467; Wake Forest University Press, 2015, ISBN 9781930630734
