= John F. Deane =

Irish poet and novelist

John F. Deane (born 1943 on Achill Island) is an Irish poet and novelist. He founded Poetry Ireland and The Poetry Ireland Review in 1979.

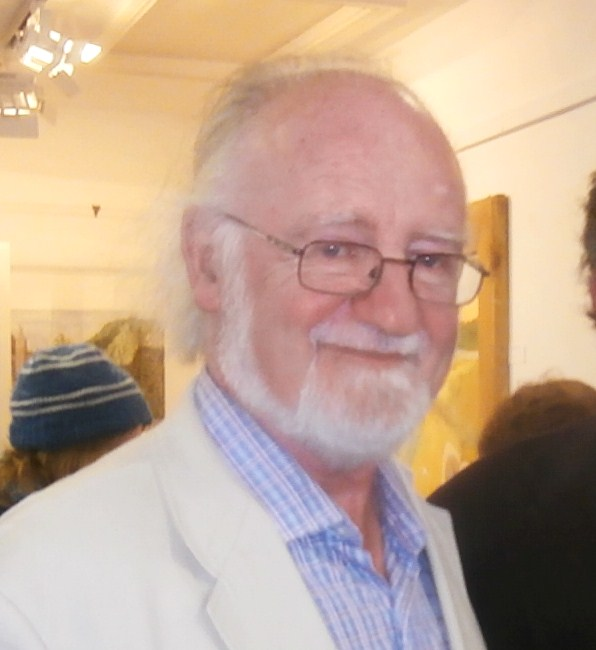
John F. Deane at Feile na Greine, Tech Amergin, Waterville. 2012

== Personal life ==
Deane was educated at the Jesuit-run boarding school Mungret College, Limerick, and University College Dublin studying English and French, he had been training to become a Spiritan priest, in Killshane, Tipperary and Holy Ghost College, Kimmage Manor but became a teacher. Deane married Barbara Sheridan. Barbara was the daughter of music hall performer Cecil Sheridan, and they had two children. Deane got married again in 1984 to Ursula Foran of Drumkeelanmore, Drumshanbo Co Leitrim, and they have one daughter, Mary, born in 1985.

== Career ==
Deane published several collections of poetry and some fiction. He won the O'Shaughnessy Award for Irish Poetry, the Marten Toonder Award for Literature and poetry prizes from Italy and Romania. Deane was elected Secretary-General of the European Academy of Poetry in 1996. Shortlisted for both the T. S. Eliot Prize and the Irish Times Poetry Now Award, he won residencies in Bavaria, Monaco and Paris. He is a member of Aosdána, the body established by the Arts Council to honour artists "whose work had made an outstanding contribution to the arts in Ireland". In 2007, the French Government honoured him by making him Chevalier, Ordre des Arts et des Lettres.

== Bibliography ==
=== Poetry ===
==== Collections ====
- Deane, John F. (1984). Winter in Meath. Dedalus.
- Road with Cypress and Star, Dedalus, 1988
- The Stylized City: Collected and New Poetry, Dedalus, 1991
- Walking on Water, Dedalus Press, 1994
- Christ, with Urban Fox, Daedalus Press, 1997
- Toccata and Fugue: New and Selected Poems, Carcanet, 2000
- Manhandling the Deity, Carcanet, 2003.
- The Instruments of Art, Carcanet, 2005
- A Little Book of Hours, Carcanet, 2008.
- Eye of the Hare, Carcanet, 2011.
- Snow Falling on Chestnut Hill, New & Selected Poems, Carcanet 2012
- Semibreve, Carcanet, 2015
- Dear Pilgrims, Carcanet, 2018
- Naming of the Bones, Carcanet, 2021
- Goldcrest,2015

==== List of poems ====
| Title | Year | First published | Reprinted/collected |
|---|---|---|---|
| The nest | 2014 | Deane, John F. (June–July 2014). "The nest". The London Magazine: 33. | |

=== Novels ===
- In the Name of the Wolf,Blackstaff Press, 1999
- Undertow, Blackstaff Press, 2002

=== Short stories ===
- The Coffin Master, Blackstaff Press, 2002
- "The Heather Fields and Other Stories", Blackstaff Press, 2007
