= 2007 in poetry =

Nationality words link to articles with information on the nation's poetry or literature (for instance, Irish or France).

== Events ==
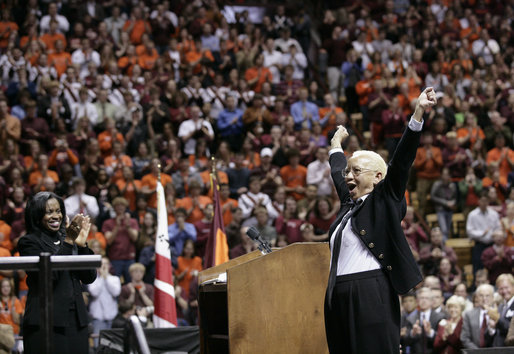
Nikki Giovanni at a Virginia Tech rally

- March 5: a car bomb was exploded on Mutanabbi Street in Baghdad. More than 30 people were killed and more than 100 were wounded. This locale is the historic center of Baghdad bookselling, a winding street filled with bookstores and outdoor book stalls. Named after the famed 10th century classical Arab poet, Al-Mutanabbi, it was an established street for bookselling for hundreds of years and the heart and soul of the Baghdad literary and intellectual community. On March 8, to remember the tragic event, Baghdad poets presented readings on the remains of the street. This was followed by various poetry readings around the United States commemorating the bombing of the historic center of the literary and intellectual community of Baghdad, many of the readings took place in the final weeks of August 2007.
- April 17: Nikki Giovanni, a professor of English at the Virginia Polytechnic Institute and State University in the US state of Virginia, both spoke and recited poetry at the campus convocation commemorating the Virginia Tech massacre of the day before. Giovanni taught the Virginia Tech shooter Seung-Hui Cho in a poetry class. She had previously approached the department chair to have Cho taken out of her class. "We are the Hokies! We will prevail! We will prevail! We are Virginia Tech!" Giovanni said, bringing the audience to its feet and into a spontaneous cheer. Giovanni closed the ceremony with a chant poem, intoning, "We are sad today, and we will be sad for quite a while. We are not moving on. We are embracing our mourning. We are Virginia Tech... We do not understand this tragedy... No one deserves a tragedy."
- August 9: Bangladeshi poet Taslima Nasreen was attacked at a book signing in the Indian state of Andhra Pradesh by a crowd of protesters who shouted for her death. The attackers consisted of lawmakers and members of the All India Majlis-e-Ittehadul Muslimeen party who objected to her writings on religion and oppression of women. After the attack, India criminally charged Nasreen with "hurting Muslim feelings", punishable by up to three years in jail.
- The New Yorker magazine announced that longtime poetry editor Alice Quinn was leaving and, as of November, Paul Muldoon, an Irish native and U.S. citizen, would be taking over what The Chronicle of Higher Education called "one of the most powerful positions in American poetry".
- Scottish poet Alastair Reid read his poem "Scotland" publicly for the last time at a literary festival in St Andrews, then burned the manuscript.
- The Eagles set "An Old-Fashioned Song", a poem by John Hollander, to music (four-part harmony with guitar chords, but mostly singing it a cappella), named it "No More Walks in the Wood" after its first line. They released it on the album, "Long Road Out of Eden". The band added no words to the 21-line poem, and there are no choruses.
- In Russia, the expert board for the Bunin Prize for poetry dissolved itself amid reports of interference and pressure from sponsors. A new expert board was formed and the jury awarded the prize to Andrei Dementyev.
- Reality television contest Prince of Poets is launched in the United Arab Emirates.

== Works published in English ==
Listed by nation where the work was first published and again by the poet's native land, if different; substantially revised works listed separately:

=== Australia ===
- Judith Bishop, Event
- David Brooks, Urban Elegies. Sydney: Island Press (Australia)
- Brook Emery, Uncommon Light, Five Islands Press. ISBN 978-0-7340-3762-6
- Lisa Gorton, Press Release
- Kathryn Lomer, Two Kinds of Silence, University of Queensland Press, ISBN 978-0-7022-3612-9
- David Malouf, Typewriter Music, winner of the 2008 Arts Queensland Judith Wright Calanthe Award
- Les Murray, Selected Poems (Black Inc.) ISBN 978-1-86395-404-4
- Dorothy Porter, El Dorado
- Peter Skrznecki, Old/New World, University of Queensland Press, ISBN 978-0-7022-3586-3
- Rob Walker, "phobiaphobia" (Picaro Press) ISBN 978-1-920957-35-3
- Petra White, The Incoming Tide

==== Australian anthologies ====
- Pretty, Ron (ed.), The Road South: An Anthology of Contemporary Australian Poetry, Kolkota, India: Bengal Creations, 2007. ISBN 978-8-1903-5243-7
- Peter Rose, The Best Australian Poems 2007, Black Inc., ISBN 978-1-86395-417-4

===== Poets in Best Australian Poetry 2007 =====
The Best Australian Poetry 2007 (ISBN 978-0-7022-3607-5), by series editors Bronwyn Lea and Martin Duwell; with 2007 guest editor John Tranter (University of Queensland Press), published work by these 40 poets:

- Robert Adamson
- Judith Bishop
- Pam Brown
- Joanne Burns
- Grant Caldwell
- Chris Edwards
- Michael Farrell
- Barbara Fisher
- Dennis Foley
- Alison Gerber
- Jennifer Harrison
- Dominique Hecq
- Matt Hetherington
- Charles Higham
- Clive James
- Mary Jenkins
- Jill Jones
- S. K. Kelen
- Cath Kenneally
- John Kinsella
- Cameron Lowe
- David McCooey
- Jennifer Maiden
- Graeme Miles
- John Millett
- Pooja Mittal
- Reg Mombassa
- Les Murray
- Louise Nicholas
- Ouyang Yu
- Geoff Page
- Megan Petrie
- Craig Powell
- Michael Riley
- Peter Rose
- Brendan Ryan
- Tracy Ryan
- Michael Sharkey
- Chris Wallace-Crabbe
- Dennis Wild

=== Canada ===
- Joanne Arnott, Mother Time
- Margaret Atwood, The Door
- Yvonne Blomer, A Broken Mirror, Fallen Leaf
- Nicole Brossard, Notebook of Roses and Civilization, translated by Erin Moure (Coach House Books) ISBN 978-1-55245-181-6
- Lorna Crozier, The Blue Hour of the Day
- Don Domanski, All Our Wonder Unavenged (Brick Books), ISBN 978-1-894078-58-0, winner of the Governor General's Book Award
- Patrick Friesen, Earth's Crude Gravities
- Paul Haines, edited by Stuart Broomer, Secret Carnival Workers (Coach House Books) ISBN 978-0-9783426-0-9
- Brian Henderson, Nerve Language
- Sarah Lang, Work of Days (Coach House Books) ISBN 978-1-55245-189-2
- Dennis Lee:
  - The Bard of the Universe. Kentville, NS: Gaspereau Press.
  - Yesno. Toronto: Anansi.
- David McGimpsey, Sitcom (Coach House Books) ISBN 978-1-55245-188-5
- George McWhirter, The Incorrection
- Garry Thomas Morse, Streams
- Erín Moure, O Cadoiro
- George Murray The Rush to Here, ISBN 978-0-88971-229-4
- bpNichol, edited by Lori Emerson and Darren Wershler-Henry, Alphabet Game: A bpNichol Reader (Coach House Books) ISBN 978-1-55245-187-8
- Barbara Nickel, Domain
- Elizabeth Philips, Torch River
- Anne Simpson Quick, ISBN 978-0-7710-8091-3
- Agnes Walsh, Going Around with Bachelors
- Rob Winger, Muybridge's Horse
- Rachel Zolf, Human Resources (Coach House Books) ISBN 978-1-55245-182-3

=== India, in English ===
- Dilip Chitre, As Is, Where Is, (Poetry in English ), Mumbai:Poetrywala; India,
- Dilip Sankarreddy, Wanderings with Poetry, Peacock Books, India
- C. P. Surendran, Portraits of the Space We Occupy (Poetry in English), New Delhi: Harper Collins, India
- Tapan Kumar Pradhan, Kalahandi, New Delhi : Sahitya Akademi

==== Anthologies in India ====
- Jeet Thayil : 60 Indian Poets : 1952-2007, New Delhi : Penguin India

=== Ireland ===
- Pat Boran, New and Selected Poems Dedalus Press, Ireland
- Patrick Cotter general editor, Colm Breathnach and Maurice Riordan 2007 editors, The Best of Irish Poetry 2007 designed to be the first of an annual series.
- Paul Durcan, The Laughter of Mothers, (Harvill Secker)
- Peter Fallon, The Company of Horses, Oldcastle: The Gallery Press, ISBN 978-1-85235-424-4
- Thomas McCarthy and Bríd Ní Bhóráin, editors, Best of Irish Poetry 2008, selections from 50 Irish poets published over a 12-month period, including Ciaran Carson, Harry Clifton, Kerry Hardie, Seamus Heaney, Biddy Jenkinson, Thomas Kinsella, Medbh McGuckian, Paula Meehan, John Montague, Bernard O'Donoghue, Robert Nye, Dennis O'Driscoll, Leanne O'Sullivan, Maurice Riordan, Billy Ramsell, David Wheatley, Liam Ó Muirthile, Celia de Fréine, Cathal Ó Searcaigh, William Wall, published October 2007 (Southword Editions) ISBN 978-1-905002-26-9 (anthology)
- Maurice Riordan, The Holy Land London: Faber and Faber, Irish poet living in and published in the United Kingdom

=== New Zealand ===
- Janet Charman, Cold Snack, Auckland: Auckland University Press
- Andrew Johnston, Sol
- Michele Leggott, Journey to Portugal (Holloway Press) a collection of poems written during a 2004 trip to Portugal and inspired by Fernando Pessoa, Portugal's great Modernist poet. Illustrated by Gretchen Albrecht.
- Paula Green, Making Lists for Francis Hodgkins, Auckland University Press
- Kay McKenzie Cooke, Made for Weather: Poems by Kay McKenzie Cooke, Otago University Press
- Jessica Le Bas, Incognito, Auckland University Press

==== Poets in Best New Zealand Poems ====
These poets wrote the 25 poems selected for Best New Zealand Poems 2006, published this year:

- Hinemoana Baker
- Cherie Barford
- Jenny Bornholdt
- James Brown
- Alistair Te Ariki Campbell
- Geoff Cochrane
- Murray Edmond
- David Eggleton
- Cliff Fell
- Brian Flaherty
- Paula Green
- Bernadette Hall
- Anna Jackson
- Andrew Johnston
- Michele Leggott
- Selina Tusitala Marsh
- Karlo Mila
- Gregory O'Brien
- Brian Potiki
- Chris Price
- Elizabeth Smither
- C. K. Stead
- JC Sturm
- Richard von Sturmer
- Alison Wong

=== United Kingdom ===
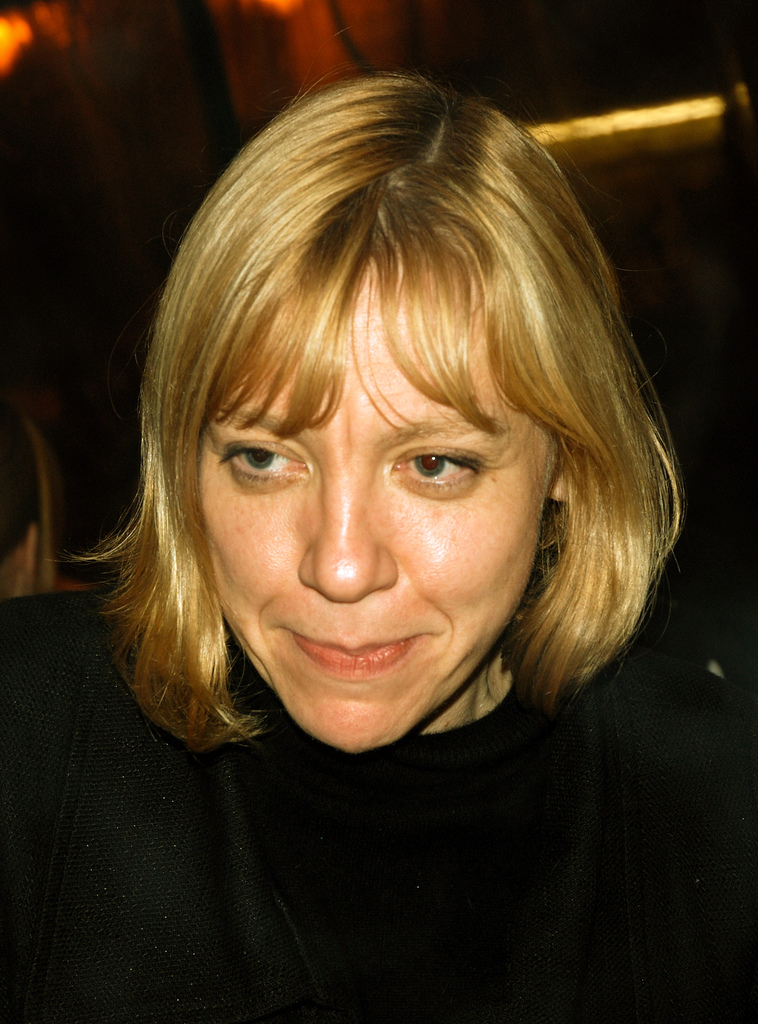
Zoë Skoulding at the Spectrum XXI festival in Paris, 2007

- Simon Armitage, translator, Sir Gawain and the Green Knight: A New Verse Translation, Faber and Faber
- W. H. Auden, Collected Poems, edited by Edward Mendelson (Modern Library) (Anglo-American poet), posthumous
- Dale Craske Remedy The Remedy With New Improved Remedy, Faber
- Carol Ann Duffy:
  - Editor, Answering Back, Picador (anthology)
  - The Hat, Faber and Faber (children's poetry)
- Ian Duhig, The Speed of Dark (Picador), on the short list for the T. S. Eliot Prize
- Alan Gillis, Hawks and Doves (Gallery), on the short list for the T. S. Eliot Prize
- Sophie Hannah, Pessimism for Beginners (Carcanet), on the short list for the T. S. Eliot Prize
- Seamus Heaney: Something to Write Home About, Nicholson and Bass
- Paul Henry, Ingrid's Husband, Seren
- Mimi Khalvati, The Meanest Flower (Carcanet), on the short list for the T. S. Eliot Prize
- Nick Laird, On Purpose (Faber & Faber)
- Frances Leviston, Public Dream (Picador), on the short list for the T. S. Eliot Prize
- Sarah Maguire, The Pomegranates of Kandahar (Chatto), on the short list for the T. S. Eliot Prize
- Edwin Morgan, A Book of Lives (Carcanet), on the short list for the T. S. Eliot Prize
- Daljit Nagra, Look We Have Coming to Dover!, Faber and Faber
- Sean O'Brien, The Drowned Book, Picador, winner of the T. S. Eliot Prize
- Michael O'Neill, The All Sustaining Air: Romantic Legacies and Renewals in British, Irish and American Poetry Since 1900 (scholarship)
- Iona Opie, editor, Mother Goose's Little Treasures, a collection of nursery rhymes
- Maurice Riordan, The Holy Land London: Faber and Faber, Irish poet living in and published in the United Kingdom
- Fiona Sampson, Common Prayer (Carcanet), on the short list for the T. S. Eliot Prize
- Zoë Skoulding, Dark Wires (with Ian Davidson)
- Matthew Sweeney, Black Moon (Jonathan Cape), on the short list for the T. S. Eliot Prize

=== United States ===
- Rae Armantrout, Next Life (Wesleyan University Press), one of the New York Times "100 Notable Books of the Year", 92 pages, ISBN 978-0-8195-6820-5
- John Ash, The Parthian Stations (Carcanet), ISBN 978-1-85754-872-3
- John Ashbery:
  - A Worldly Country: New Poems Ecco/HarperCollins, ISBN 978-0-06-117383-7
  - Notes from the Air: Selected Later Poems, Ecco/HarperCollins, ISBN 978-0-06-136717-5 ISBN
- W. H. Auden, Collected Poems, edited by Edward Mendelson (Modern Library) (Anglo-American poet), posthumous
- Mary Jo Bang, Elegy, Graywolf, winner of the National Book Critics Circle Award
- Roger Bonair-Agard, Tarnish and Masquerade (Cypher Books, Rattapallax Press)
- Yosa Buson (1716–1783), Haiku Master Buson, translated from the Japanese by Edith Shiffert and (posthumous) Yuki Sawa, University of Washington Press, ISBN 978-1-893996-81-6; claimed by the publisher to be "the only translation of the work of this important haiku poet in English"
- Laynie Browne, Daily Sonnets, Counterpath Press
- Charles Bukowski, The Pleasures of the Damned, edited by John Martin, Ecco/HarperCollins
- Kelly Cherry, Hazard and Prospect: New and Selected Poems (Louisiana State University Press), ISBN 978-0-8071-3263-0
- Henri Cole, Blackbird and Wolf (Farrar, Straus and Giroux)
- Jim Daniels, Now Showing (Ahadada Books)
- Edward Dorn:
  - Way More West, edited by Michael Rothenberg, Penguin Books ISBN 978-0-14-303869-6 (posthumous)
  - Ed Dorn Live: Lectures, Interviews, and Outtakes, edited by Joseph Richey, University of Michigan Press ISBN 978-0-472-06862-3 (posthumous), criticism
- Mark Doty, Dog Years (HarperCollins)
- Michael Dumanis, My Soviet Union, (University of Massachusetts Press, Juniper Prize for Poetry)
- Amy England, Victory and Her Opposites, Tupelo Press
- Aaron Fagan, Garage (Salt Publishing)
- Jessica Fisher, Frail-Craft, foreword by Louise Glück (Yale UP)
- Graham Foust, Necessary Stranger, Flood Editions
- Nikki Giovanni, Acolytes: Poems, William Morrow
- Albert Goldbarth, The Kitchen Sink: New and Selected Poems 1972–2007, Graywolf
- Noah Eli Gordon, Novel Pictorial Noise, HarperCollins
- Mildred White Greear, Moving Gone Dancing Archived May 8, 2008, at the Wayback Machine (Fall Line Arts Press), ISBN 978-0-9799379-0-3
- Linda Gregerson, Magnetic North (Houghton Mifflin)
- Paul Guest, Notes For My Body Double, University of Nebraska–Lincoln
- Beth Gylys, Matchbook (La Vita Poetica Press), later set to music by Dan Welcher
- Forrest Hamer, Rift (Four Way Books)
- Matthea Harvey, Modern Life, Graywolf, a finalist for the National Book Critics Circle Award
- Robert Hass, Time and Materials: Poems, 1997–2005 (Ecco/Harper-Collins), one of the New York Times "100 Notable Books of the Year"
- Christian Hawkey, Citizen Of, Wave Books
- Brian Henry, The Stripping Point, Counterpath Press
- Zbigniew Herbert, The Collected Poems: 1956–1998 (Ecco), one of the New York Times "100 Notable Books of the Year"
- Bob Hicok, This Clumsy Living, Pittsburgh University Press
- Anselm Hollo, Guests of Space, Coffee House
- Fanny Howe, The Lyrics, Graywolf Press
- Susan Howe, Souls of the Labadie Tract (New Directions)
- Eugen Jebeleanu, Secret Weapon: The Late Poems of Eugen Jebeleanu, translated from Romanian by Matthew Zapruder, (Coffee House)
- Pierre Joris, Meditations on the Stations of Mansour Al-Halla, 1 – 21, (Anchorite Press, Albany, NY)
- James Browning Kepple, Kim Göransson, Couplet (pretend genius [press]) ISBN 9780977852697
- Henia Karmel and Ilona Karmel, A Wall of Two: Poems of Resistance and Suffering from Kraków to Buchenwald and Beyond, adapted by Fanny Howe, University of California Press
- X. J. Kennedy, In a Prominent Bar in Secaucus: New & Selected Poems 1955–2007, Johns Hopkins University Press
- Karl Kirchwey, The Happiness of This World
- Yusef Komunyakaa and Chad Gracia, Gilgamesh: A Verse Play, Wesleyan University Press
- Hiram Larew, More Than Anything (VRZHU Press) ISBN 978-1-4303-1406-6
- James Longenbach, Draft of a Letter (Spring)
- Martial, Martial: The World of the Epigram, translated by William Fitzgerald, University of Chicago Press (posthumous)
- Michael Meyerhofer Leaving Iowa (Briery Creek Press)
- William Michaelian:
  - Another Song I Know (Cosmopsis Books) ISBN 978-0-9796599-1-1
  - Winter Poems (Cosmopsis Books), ISBN 978-0-9796599-0-4
- Jennifer Moxley The Line (The Post-Apollo Press)
- Ann E. Mullaney, translator, Teofilo Folengo (1491–1544), Baldo, Volume 1, Books I-XII, translated from a blend of Latin and various Italian dialects (Harvard University Press), posthumous
- Laura Mullen, Murmur, Futurepoem Books
- Kate Northrup, Things Are Disappearing Here: Poems Braziller/Persea
- Alice Notley In the Pines (Penguin Books)
- Michael O'Brien, Sleeping and Waking, Flood, a finalist for the National Book Critics Circle Award
- George Oppen, Selected Prose, Daybooks, and Papers (edited by Stephen Cope), University of California Press, 2007 (publication was 2007, but not available until 2008)
- Terry Philips, Oulipoems (Ahadada Books)
- Carl Phillips, Quiver of Arrows: Selected poems (Farrar Straus & Giroux)
- Tom Pickard, The Ballad of Jamie Allan, Flood, a finalist for the National Book Critics Circle Award
- Robert Pinsky, Gulf Music (Farrar, Straus and Giroux), ISBN 978-0-374-16749-3 ISBN 978-0-374-16749-3
- J. E. Pitts The Weather of Dreams (David Robert Books)
- Meghan O'Rourke, Halflife (Norton)
- Bin Ramke, Tendril, Omnidawn
- Donald Revell, A Thief of Strings, Alice James Books
- Adrienne Rich, Poetry and Commitment (Norton)
- Kim Roberts, The Kimnama (VRZHU Press) ISBN 978-1-4303-1407-3
- Martha Ronk, Vertigo, Coffee House Press
- J. Allyn Rosser, Foiled Again, (Fall) Ivan R. Dee
- Jerome Rothenberg, China Notes & The Treasures of DunHuang (Ahadada Books)
- Tadeusz Rozewicz, New Poems, Archipelago, a finalist for the National Book Critics Circle Award
- Leslie Scalapino, Day Ocean State of Stars' Night: Poems & Writings 1989 & 1999–2006 (Green Integer)
- Grace Schulman, The Broken String
- W. G. Sebald, Unrecounted, New Directions
- David Shapiro, New and Selected Poems, 1965–2006 (Overlook Press)
- Ron Silliman, The Age of Huts (complete) (UC Press)
- Tom Sleigh, Space Walk
- Cathy Song, Cloud Moving Hands, University of Pittsburgh Press
- Rod Smith, Deed (Iowa UP)
- Gary Soto, A Simple Plan
- Mark Strand, New Selected Poems, by a Canadian native long living in and published in the United States
- Cole Swensen, The Glass Age, Alice James Books
- Tony Tost, Complex Sleep (Iowa UP)
- David Trinidad, The Late Show: Poems Turtle Point
- Nance Van Winckel, No Starling, University of Washington Press, ISBN 978-0-295-98735-4
- Derek Walcott, Selected Poems, edited by Edward Baugh (Faber), one of the New York Times "100 Notable Books of the Year"
- G. C. Waldrep, Disclamor, BOA Editions
- Philip Whalen, The Collected Poems of Philip Whalen, Wesleyan University Press
- John Wieners, A Book of Prophecies (Bootstrap Press
- C. D. Wright, One Big Self: An Investigation, a book-length poem, Copper Canyon
- C. Dale Young, The Second Person (Four Way Books)
- Kevin Young, For the Confederate Dead, (Knopf)

==== Criticism, scholarship and biography in the United States ====
- Edward Dorn, Ed Dorn Live: Lectures, Interviews, and Outtakes (University of Michigan Press)
- Robert Faggen, editor, The Notebooks of Robert Frost, Harvard University Press
- Sam Hamill, Avocations: On Poets and Poetry, Red Hen
- James Longenbach, The Art of the Poetic Line, Graywolf Press, ISBN 978-1-55597-495-4 ISBN 978-1-55597-495-4
- Janet Malcolm, Two Lives: Gertrude and Alice, about Gertrude Stein and Alice Toklas (Yale University Press), biography
- Karen Marguerite Moloney, Seamus Heaney and the Emblems of Hope, ISBN 978-0-8262-1744-8
- A. David Moody, Ezra Pound: Poet I: The Young Genius 1885–1920
- Adrienne Rich, Poetry and Commitment: An Essay
- Mark Scroggins, The Poem of a Life: A Biography of Louis Zukofsky

==== Anthologies in the United States ====
- Allison Hedge Coke, editor – To Topos/Oregon State University Ahani: Indigenous American Poetry
- Julia Kasdorf and Michael Tyrell, editors, Broken Land: Poems of Brooklyn, anthology (New York University)
- David Lehman, general editor, Heather McHugh, 2007 editor, The Best American Poetry 2007 Scribner ISBN 978-0-7432-9973-2
- Kei Miller, New Caribbean Poetry, including poems by Christian Campbell, Loretta Collins, Delores Gauntlett, Shara McCallum, Marilene Phipps, Jennifer Rahim, Tanya Shirley, and Ian Strachan; Carcanet
- Claudia Rankine and Lisa Sewell, editors, American Poets in the 21st century: The New Poetics, featuring the work of 13 poets: Joshua Clover, Stacy Doris, Peter Gizzi, Kenneth Goldsmith, Myung Mi Kim, Mark Levine, Tracie Morris, Mark Nowak, D.A. Powell, Juliana Spahr, Karen Volkman, Susan Wheeler, and Kevin Young; accompanied by an audio CD of readings from each poet; Wesleyan University Press, ISBN 978-0-8195-6728-4
- Daniel Tobin, editor, The Book of Irish American Poetry: From the Eighteenth Century to the Present, University of Notre Dame Press
- Natasha Trethewey, editor, Jeb Livingood, series editor, Best New Poets 2007: 50 Poems from Emerging Writers (Samovar Press)

===== Poets in The Best American Poetry 2007 =====
These poets appeared in The Best American Poetry 2007, with David Lehman, general editor, and Heather McHugh, guest editor (who selected the poetry) (Scribner ISBN 978-0-7432-9973-2):

- Kazim Ali
- Jeannette Allee
- Rae Armantrout
- Mary Jo Bang
- Nicky Beer
- Marvin Bell
- Christian Bök
- Louis E. Bourgeois
- Geoffrey Brock
- Matthew Byrne
- MacGregor Card
- Julie Carr
- Michael Collier
- Billy Collins
- Robert Creeley
- Mike Dockins
- Sharon Dolin
- Denise Duhamel
- Stephen Dunn
- Russell Edson
- Elaine Equi
- Landis Everson
- Thomas Fink
- Helen Ransom Forman
- Louise Glück
- Albert Goldbarth
- Donald Hall
- Mark Halliday
- Forrest Hamer
- Matthea Harvey
- Robert Hass
- Jane Hirshfield
- Daniel Johnson
- Richard Kenney
- Milton Kessler
- Galway Kinnell
- David Kirby
- Julie Larios
- Brad Leithauser
- Ben Lerner
- Joanie Mackowski
- Amit Majmudar
- Sabrina Orah Mark
- Campbell McGrath
- Leslie Adrienne Miller
- Marilyn Nelson
- Meghan O'Rourke
- Ed Ochester
- Gregory Orr
- Danielle Pafunda
- Chad Parmenter
- Susan Parr
- Peter Pereira
- Robert Pinsky
- David Rivard
- Marya Rosenberg
- Natasha Sajé
- Frederick Seidel
- Alan Shapiro
- David Shumate
- Carmine Starnino
- Brian Turner
- Arthur Vogelsang
- Cody Walker
- Kary Wayson
- Charles Harper Webb
- Joe Wenderoth
- Richard Wilbur
- George Witte
- Theodor Worozbyt
- Harriet Zinnes

=== Other in English ===
- Breyten Breytenbach, Windcatcher: New and Selected Poems, 1964–2006, Harcourt (South African)

== Works published in other languages ==
=== Bangladesh ===
- Chandan chowdhury- Crab of Red river. (Lal kakrar nodi); Balaka prakash, Chittagong, Bangladesh. – Bengali poetry

=== Denmark ===
- Annette Kure Andersen, Andetsteds ("Elsewhere")
- Thomas Boberg, Gæstebogen ("Guest Book")
- Anne-Louise Bosmans, Villa ("Villa")
- Duna Ghali, En have med duft af mand ("A Garden with the Scent of Man")
- Simon Grotrian:
  - Din frelser bliver din klippe ("Your Savior is Your Rock"), psalms
  - Tyve sorte kinder ("Twenty Black Cheeks")
- Lone Hørslev, Lige mig ("Me to a T")
- Niels Lyngsø, 39 digte til det brændende bibliotek ("39 Poems for a Burning Library")
- Henrik Nordbrandt, Besøgstid ("Visiting Hours")
- Palle Sigsgaard, Glitrende støv danser ("Glittering Dust Dances"), a short collection
- Peter Christensen Teilmann, Friværdi ("Equity")

=== French language ===
==== France ====
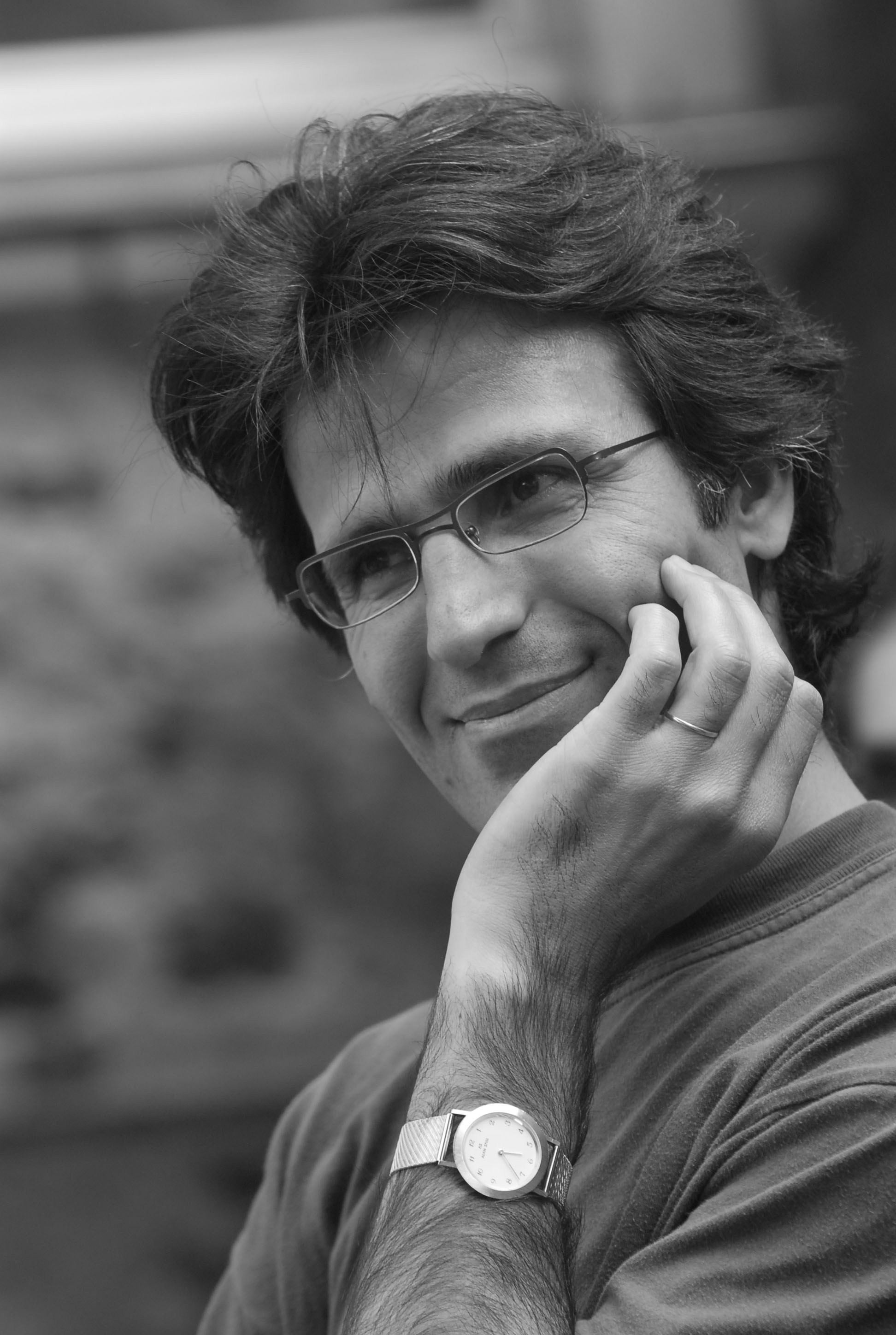
Seyhmus Dagtekin in 2007, a Turkish poet who writes in Turkish, Kurdish and French

- Guillaume Apollinaire, Je pense à toi mon Lou ("I Think of You My Lou"), publisher: Textuel; writings published for the first time
- Seyhmus Dagtekin, Juste un pont sans feu, publisher: Le Castor astral
- Emily Dickinson, Car l'adieu, c'est la nuit, translated from the original English by Claire Malroux, based on the Johnson edition; Gallimard/NRF
- Claude Esteban, La Mort à distance ("Death at a Distance"), published posthumously, publisher: Gallimard
- Louise Gaggini, Les Enfants sont la mémoire des hommes ("Children Are the Memory of Men"), publisher: Multitudes, a poetic tale for the benefit of UNICEF
- Jean Grosjean, Arpèges et paraboles, ("Arpège and parables"), publisher: Gallimard
- Abdellatif Laabi, Mon cher double, La Différence, coll. Clepsydre, Paris, Moroccan author writing in French and published in France

===== Anthologies published in France =====
- L'Année poétique 2007 ("The Poetry Year 2007"), publisher: Seghers; 125 contemporary poems; anthology
- Jean Orizet, editor, Anthologie de la poésie française ("Anthology of French Poetry"), publisher: Larousse, anthology
- Christian Poslianec, editor, Duos d'amour, ("Love Duets"), publisher: Seghers, anthology of love poems

==== Canada, in French ====
- Jacques Allard, editor, Le Bonheur des poètes, publisher: Écrits des Forges, contemporary poetry anthology

=== German ===
- Lindita Arapi, Am Meer, nachts, Albanian poet writing in German
- Christoph Buchwald, series editor, 25. Jahrbuch der Lyrik: Die schönsten Gedichte aus 25 Jahren ("25. Yearbook of Poetry: The most beautiful poems from 25 years"); Frankfurt: Fischer (S.), 410 pages, ISBN 978-3-10-009653-1, an anthology
- Hendrik Jackson, Im Innern der zerbrechenden Schale. Poetik und Pastichen ("Inside the crumbling shell: Poetics and pastiche"), Kookbooks, 144 pages, ISBN 978-3-937445-24-3; Germany
- Monika Rinck, with Daniela Seel (editor), and Andrew Potter (narrator), zum fernbleiben der umarmung ("to stay away from the embrace"), 78 pages, Kookbooks, ISBN 978-3-937445-23-6; Germany
- Ron Winkler, Fragmentierte Gewässer: Gedichte ("Fragmented Waters: Poems"), Berlin Verlag, 83 pages, ISBN 978-3-8270-0695-0

=== Greece ===
- Katerina Iliopoulou, Mister T., Melani editions
- Patricia Kolaiti, ‘Celesteia, Nefeli Publishing; nominated for the 2008 Diavazo First Book Award
- Karaoke Poetry Bar, Athens: Futura Editions, an anthology

=== India ===
In each section, listed in alphabetical order by first name:

==== Malayalam ====
- K. G. Sankara Pillai, KGS Kavithakal 1997–2006, Kottayam, Kerala: D C Books
- Raghavan Atholi:
  - Kanalormmakal, Calicut: Avvaiyar Books
  - Kathunna Mazhakal, Calicut: Mathrubhumi
- Veerankutty, Autograph, Kottayam: DC Books

==== Other in India ====
- Gagan Gill, translator, Devadoot Ki Bajay Kuchh Bhi, poems by Zbigniew Herbert, edited and translated into Hindi from the original Polish; Remadhav Publications, New Delhi, 2007
- Mamta Sagar, Hiige HaaLeya Maile HaaDu, Bangalore: Abhinava Prakashana, Kannada-language
- Mithu Sen, Bashmati Sarir Bagan Ba Gaan, (1995–2005), Kolkata: Nandimukh; Bengali-language
- Rituraj, Asha Naam Nadi, Hindi-language

=== Poland ===
- Ewa Lipska, Pomarańcza Newtona, ("Newton's Orange"); Kraków: Wydawnictwo literackie
- Tadeusz Różewicz, nauka chodzenia, Wrocław: Biuro Literackie
- Tomasz Różycki, The Forgotten Keys

=== Spanish language ===
==== Latin America ====
- Roberto Bolaño, La universidad desconocida, his complete poems, a collection he prepared (posthumous), Chile
- Pablo De Santis, El enigma de Paris, Argentina
- Jorge Nájar, El árbol de Sodoma, Peru

=== Serbia ===
- Dejan Stojanović, Ples vremena (Dance of Time), Konras, Beograd, 2007

=== Other languages ===
- Qaysar Aminpur, Dastur-i zaban-i eshq (“A Grammar of Love”), the best-selling poetry book this year in Iran
- Mahmud Darwish, La uridu li-hadhi al-qasidah an tantahi ("I Do Not Want This Poem to End"), published posthumously; Arabian, Egypt
- Sheida Mohamadi, Aks-e fowri-ye 'eshq-bazi ("A Snapshot of Love-Making"), a (Los Angeles) United States-based author published this year in Tehran, Iran; Persian
- Suzan 'Ulaywan, Bayt min sukkar, ("A House Made of Sugar"), Arabic
- Santiago B. Villafania, Malagilion: Sonnets tan Villanelles, Filipino poet writing in Pangasinan

== Awards and honors ==
=== International ===
- Nobel Prize in Literature: Doris Lessing, Great Britain
- Golden Wreath of Poetry: Mahmoud Darwish (Palestine)

=== Australia ===
- C. J. Dennis Prize for Poetry: Judy Johnson, Jack, Pandanus Press
- Dinny O'Hearn Poetry Prize: The Goldfinches of Baghdad by Robert Adamson
- Kenneth Slessor Prize for Poetry:

=== Canada ===
- Archibald Lampman Award: Monty Reid, Disappointment Island
- Atlantic Poetry Prize: Steve McOrmond, Primer on the Hereafter
- Gerald Lampert Award: Steven Price, Anatomy of Keys
- Governor General's Literary Awards: Don Domanski, All Our Wonder Unavenged (English); Serge Patrice Thibodeau, Seul on est (French)
- Griffin Poetry Prize:
  - Canada, in the English language: Don McKay, Strike/Slip
  - Canada, in the French language: Serge Patrice Thibodeau, Seul on est
  - International, in the English Language: Charles Wright, Scar Tissue; and **"Lifetime Recognition Award" (presented by the Griffin trustees) to Tomas Tranströmer
  - International shortlist: Paul Farley, Tramp in Flames (Picador); Rodney Jones, Salvation Blues (Houghton Mifflin); Frederick Seidel, Ooga Booga (Farrar, Straus, Giroux)
- Pat Lowther Award: Sina Queyras, Lemon Hound
- Prix Alain-Grandbois: François Charron, Ce qui nous abandonne
- Dorothy Livesay Poetry Prize: Don McKay, Strike/Slip
- Prix Émile-Nelligan: Danny Plourde, calme aurore (s'unir ailleurs, du napalm plein l'œil)

=== New Zealand ===
- Prime Minister's Awards for Literary Achievement: Dick Scott, Bill Manhire and Fiona Farrell
- Montana New Zealand Book Awards:
  - Poetry: Janet Frame, for The Goose Bath
  - Jessie Mackay Best First Book of Poetry: Airini Beautrais Secret Heart. Victoria University Press

=== United Kingdom ===
- Costa Award (formerly the Whitbread Awards) for poetry : John Haynes (poet), Letter to Patience (Seren, 2006), a book-length poem; (Judges: Elaine Feinstein, Jeremy Noel-Tod and Deryn Rees-Jones)
- Cholmondeley Award : Judith Kazantzis, Robert Nye, Penelope Shuttle
- David Cohen Prize : Derek Mahon
- Eric Gregory Award : Rachel Curzon, Miriam Gamble, Michael McKimm, Helen Mort, Jack Underwood
- Forward Poetry Prizes:
  - Best collection : Sean O'Brien, for The Drowned Book
  - Best first collection : Daljit Nagra, for Look We Have Coming To Dover!
  - Best single poem : Alice Oswald, for "Dunt"
- Queen's Gold Medal for Poetry : James Fenton
- National Poetry Competition : Sinead Morrissey for Through the Square Window
- T. S. Eliot Prize : Sean O'Brien for The Drowned Book

=== United States ===
- Agnes Lynch Starrett Poetry Prize awarded to Michael McGriff for Dismantling the Hills
- Bollingen Prize: Frank Bidart
- Dwarf Stars Award: Jane Yolen, Last Unicorn
- Lenore Marshall Poetry Prize: Alice Notley, for Grave of Light: New and Selected Poems 1970–2005
- Los Angeles Times Book Prize for poetry: Stanley Plumly, Old Heart: Poems (W. W. Norton)
- National Book Award for Poetry: Robert Hass, for Time and Materials
- The New Criterion Poetry Prize: J. Allyn Rosser, for Foiled Again
- Pulitzer Prize for Poetry (United States): Natasha Trethewey, for Native Guard
- Rhysling Award:
  - Mike Allen, The Journey to Kailash (Long Form)
  - Rich Ristow, The Graven Idol's Godheart (Short Form)
- Wallace Stevens Award: Charles Simic
- Whiting Awards: Paul Guest, Cate Marvin

==== From the Poetry Society of America ====
- Frost Medal: John Hollander
- Shelley Memorial Award: Kimiko Hahn; Judges: Major Jackson, Maurya Simon, and George Stanley
- Writer Magazine/Emily Dickinson Award: James Richardson; Judge: Matthea Harvey
- Cecil Hemley Memorial Award: Yerra Sugarman; Judge: Michael Palmer
- Lyric Poetry Award: Ed Skoog; Judge: Srikanth Reddy
- Lucille Medwick Memorial Award: Wayne Miller; Judge: Tracy K. Smith
- Alice Fay Di Castagnola Award: Rusty Morrison; Judge: Susan Howe
- Louise Louis/Emily F. Bourne Student Poetry Award: Laura Ruffino; Judge: Thomas Sayers Ellis
- George Bogin Memorial Award: Wayne Miller; Judge: Eleni Sikelianos
- Robert H. Winner Memorial Award: Charlene Fix; finalists: Eva Heisler, Rick Hilles
- Norma Farber First Book Award: Kate Colby, Fruitlands Litmus Press; Judge: Rosmarie Waldrop
- William Carlos Williams Award: Matthew Zapruder, The Pijamaist, Copper Canyon Press; finalists: Liam Rector, Elaine Terranova; Judge: Tony Hoagland

=== Awards and honors given elsewhere ===
- Cervantes Prize (Spain): Juan Gelman (Argentina)

== Deaths ==
Birth years link to the corresponding "[year] in poetry" article:

- January 13 – Diké Omeje, English, cancer
- January 19 – Fiama Hasse Pais Brandão (born 1938), Portugal
- February 13 – Elizabeth Jolley, English-born, Australian author, poet and scriptwriter
- February 14 – Emmett Williams, 81, American poet, known for among other reasons, his collaborations with Daniel Spoerri and Claus Bremer in the Darmstadt circle of concrete poetry, dynamic theater, etc., from 1957 to 1959
- February 24 – Julia Casterton, English
- March 19:
  - Shimon Tzabar, 80, Israeli artist, author, poet and former Haaretz columnist, pneumonia
  - Robert Dickson, 62, Canadian professor, award-winning Franco-Ontarian writer and poet, cancer
- March 20 – Rita Joe, 75, Canadian Mi'kmaq poet, of Parkinson's disease.
- May 25 – Len Roberts, 60, American poet, professor
- May 30 – William M. Meredith, 88, American, poet, professor
- May 31 – Sarah Hannah, 40, American poet, professor
- June 2 – John Moriarty, 69, Irish poet and philosopher
- June 7 –; Michael Hamburger, 83, German poet, translator
- June 20 – Nazik al-Mala'ika, 85, Iraqi poet
- June 21 – Mary Ellen Solt, 86, American poet, critic
- June 11 – Mercer Simpson, 81, Welsh poet, critic and academic writing in English
- June 25 – Rahim al-Maliki, 39, Iraqi poet
- June 27 – Dragutin Tadijanović, 101, Croatian poet
- July 1 – Mộng Tuyết, 93, Vietnamese poet
- July 2:
  - Philip Booth, 81, American poet, professor
  - Sandy Crimmins, 55, American poet, performance artist
- July 11 – Noel Rowe (born 1951), Australian, poet, writer, academic and Roman Catholic priest in the Marist order
- July 16 – Dmitri Prigov, 66, Russian poet, artist
- July 18 – Sekou Sundiata, 58, American poet, performance artist
- July 31 – Margaret Avison, 89, Canadian poet
- August 15:
  - Liam Rector, 57, American poet, professor, critic
  - Khalid Alig, 82, Indian poet, journalist
- August 22 – Grace Paley, 84, American poet, short story writer, activist
- August 24 – Robbie Benoit, Canadian cowboy poet and writer
- August 25 – Tarapada Roy (born 1936) Bengali poet, essayist and short-story writer known for his satirical sense of humour
- August 27 – Alberto de Lacerda 78, Portuguese poet
- September 13 – Bill Griffiths, 59, English poet and writer
- October 21 – R. B. Kitaj, 74, American-born artist, a friend of poets, via his portraits of poets Robert Duncan, Robert Creeley, Charles Olson & others
- October 30:
  - James Michie (poet), 80 (born 1927), English poet, translator and publisher
  - Paul Roche, 91 (born 1916), English poet, translator and academic once associated with the Bloomsbury Group
- November 16 – Vernon Scannell, 85 (born 1922), English poet, novelist and biographer
- November 17? – Landis Everson, 81, American poet, had a loose affiliation with the Berkeley Renaissance via his association with Jack Spicer's circle of poets. Everson's work was "rediscovered" only a few years before his death.
- November 17:
  - Siv Cedering, 68, Swedish-American poet, painter, sculptor, illustrator, and author, of pancreatic cancer
  - Meg Campbell (born 1937), New Zealand poet and wife of Alistair Campbell
- November 29 – Jaleh Esfahani, 86 (born 1921), in London, Iranian, a woman
- December 16 – Diane Wood Middlebrook, née Helen Diane Wood, 68, (born 1939), American poet, academic and biographer
- December 30 – Rosemary C. Wilkinson, American poet and Honorary President of the World Academy of Arts and Culture (WAAC)
- Also:
  - Edith Hannah Campion, New Zealand poet and actress
  - Alberto da Cunha Melo, Brazil

== See also ==
- List of poetry awards
