= The Best American Poetry 2007 =

The Best American Poetry 2007, a volume in The Best American Poetry series, was edited by poet Heather McHugh, guest editor, who made the final selections, and David Lehman, the general editor for the series.

This book is the 20th volume in the most popular annual poetry anthology in the United States. Along with popular poets who have often appeared in previous editions, such as Billy Collins, Louise Gluck and Galway Kinnell, the book includes poets of "off-center traditions" such as Rae Armantrout and Christian Bok. Some of McHugh's selections from newer poets "tend toward the experimental," according to a review in Publishers Weekly, which pointed to poems from Ben Lerner and Danielle Pafunda as evidence of this. Publishers Weekly called it a "riskier than usual volume."

Richard Wakefield, reviewing the volume in The Seattle Times, wrote that McHugh's selections were "as eccentric, sometimes as unabashedly goofy, as any in the series' two decades," but among them were a couple of dozen "very fine" poems. Wakefield in particular praised the poems by Carmine Starnino and Brad Leithauser, but called the Nicky Beer selection merely "clever prose arranged as questions and answers," and that poem's inclusion probably due to a common "weakness" among poets for wordplay. McHugh's essay introducing the volume was briefer than those of most of her predecessors, according to Wakefield, but was itself almost worth the cost of the book and contains some phrasing "as good as anything in the volume."

In her review of the book for The Tampa Tribune, Karen Haymon wrote that the poems by established poets generally outshone the work of the lesser-known writers, with plenty of poems "good and worth reading" by established names such as Billy Collins, Donald Hall, and Robert Hass. However, Haymon called a poem by Brian Turner, an Iraq veteran, a pleasant discovery.

== Poets and poems included ==
Listed in alphabetical order by author's name:

Poet	Poem	Publication where poem previously appeared
Kazim Ali	"The Art of Breathing"	Barrow Street
Jeannette Allee	"Crimble of Staines"	Field
Rae Armantrout	"Scumble"	American Poet
Mary Jo Bang	"The Opening"	Verse
Nicky Beer	"Still Life with Half-Turned Woman and Questions"	Beloit Poetry Journal
Marvin Bell	"The Method"	Crazyhorse
Christian Bok	"Vowels"	New American Writing
Louis E. Bourgeois	"A Voice from the City"	Sentence
Geoffrey Brock	"Flesh of John Brown's Flesh: Dec. 2, 1859"	Subtropics
Matthew Byrne	"Let Me Count the Ways"	Poet Lore
Macgregor Card	"Duties of an English Foreign Secretary"	Fence
Julie Carr	"marriage"	POOL
Michael Collier	"Common Flicker"	TriQuarterly
Billy Collins	"The News Today"	Bookforum
Robert Creeley	"Valentine for You"	Crazyhorse
Linh Dinh	"Continuous Bullets over Flattened Earth and A Super-Clean Country"	New American Writing
Mike Dockins	"Dead Critics Society"	Atlanta Review
Sharon Dolin	"Tea Lay"	New American Writing
Denise Duhamel	"Language Police Report"	Sentence
Stephen Dunn	"Where He Found Himself"	Iowa Review
Russell Edson	"See Jack"	Sentence
Elaine Equi	"Etudes"	the tiny
Landis Everson	"Lemon Tree"	American Poetry Review
Thomas Fink	"Yinglish Strophes IX"	Barrow Street
Helen Ransom Forman	"Daily"	Michigan Quarterly Review
Louise Gluck	"Archaic Fragment"	Poetry
Albert Goldbarth	"Stopping by Woods on a Snowy Evening"	New Letters
Donald Hall	"The Master"	American Poetry Review
Mark Halliday	"Best Am Po"	POOL
Forrest Hamer	"Initiation"	American Poetry Review
Matthea Harvey	"From The Future of Terror/Terror of the Future Series"	Bomb
Robert Hass	"Bush's War"	American Poetry Review
Jane Hirshfield	"Critique of Pure Reason"	Ploughshares
Daniel Johnson	"Do Unto Others"	Barrow Street
Richard Kenney	"Auguries"	Southwest Review
Milton Kessler	"Comma of God"	Sentence
Galway Kinnell	"Hide-and-Seek, 1933"	Beloit Poetry Journal
David Kirby	"Ode to the Personals"	Five Points
Julie Larios	"What Bee Did"	The Cortland Review
Brad Leithauser	"A Good List"	The New Criterion
Ben Lerner	"From Angle of Yaw"	Beloit Poetry Journal
Joanie Mackowski	"When I was a dinosaur"	POOL
Amit Majmudar	"By Accident"	The Antioch Review
Sabrina Orah Mark	"The 10 Stages of Beatrice"	Conduit
Campbell McGrath	"Ode to the Plantar Fascia"	POOL
Leslie Adrienne Miller	"On Leonardo's Drawings"	The Kenyon Review
Marilyn Nelson	"Etymology"	Literary Imagination
Meghan O'Rourke	"Peep Show"	The Kenyon Review
Ed Ochester	"Voltaire at Cirey, 1736"	Barrow Street
Gregory Orr	"From Concerning the Book; That Is the Body of the Beloved"	RATTLE
Danielle Pafunda	"Dear Pearce & Pearce, Inc."	Denver Quarterly
Chad Parmenter	"A Tech's Ode to Genome Computer"	The Kenyon Review
Susan Parr	"Swooping Actuarial Fauna and Ecstatic Cling"	Alaska Quarterly Review
Peter Pereira	"Nursmaid's Elbow"	New England Review
Robert Pinsky	"Stupid Meditation on Peace"	The New Yorker
Robert Pinsky	"Louie Louie"	American Poetry Review
David Rivard	"The Rev. Larry Love is Dead"	TriQuarterly
Marya Rosenberg	"If I Tell You You're Beautiful, Will; You Report Me?: A West Point Haiku Series"	Hanging Loose
Natasha Saje	"F"	Beloit Poetry Journal
Frederick Seidel	"The Death of the Sha"	Raritan Quarterly Review
Alan Shapiro	"Country Western Singer"	The Virginia Quarterly Review
David Shumate	"Drawing Jesus"	Gulf Coast
Carmine Starnino	"Money"	New American Writing
Brian Turner	"What Every Soldier Should Know"	American Poet
Arthur Vogelsang	"The Family"	Colorado Review
Cody Walker	"Coulrophobia"	Tarpaulin Sky
Kary Wayson	"Flu Song in Spanish"	Alaska Quarterly Review
Charles Harper Webb	"Big"	Michigan Quarterly Review
Joe Wenderoth	"The Home of the Brave"	Sacramento News & Review
Richard Wilbur	"From Opposites and More Opposites"	American Poet
George Witte	"At Dusk, the Catbird"	The Vocabula Review
Theodor Worozbyt	"An Experiment"	Crazyhorse
Harriet Zinnes	"Remiss Rebut"	Colorado Review

== Publishing information ==
The book is published by Scribner.

224 pages

Hardcover: ISBN 978-0-7432-9972-5

Paperback: ISBN 978-0-7432-9973-2

ISBN 0-7432-9973-6

== See also ==
- 2007 in poetry
