= Paul Guest =

Paul Guest may refer to:

- Paul Guest (poet) (fl. 1990s–2020s), American poet and memoirist
- Paul Guest (rower) (1939–2026), Australian rower, family law barrister, and judge
  - Paul Guest Prize, contemporary Australian drawing prize named for the judge
