= Gulf Coast (magazine) =

American literary magazine

Gulf Coast: A Journal of Literature and Fine Arts
- Editor: Nick Rattner
- Categories: Literary magazine
- Frequency: Biannual
- Circulation: 2,500
- First issue: 1986; 40 years ago
- Company: Department of English, University of Houston
- Country: United States
- Based in: Houston, Texas
- Language: English
- Website: www.gulfcoastmag.org
- ISSN: 0896-2251

Gulf Coast: A Journal of Literature and Fine Arts is a literary magazine from Houston, Texas. Founded in 1986 by Donald Barthelme and Phillip Lopate, Gulf Coast was envisioned as an intersection between the literary and visual arts communities. As a result, Gulf Coast has partnered with the University of Houston's Creative Writing Program, the Museum of Fine Arts, Houston, and the Menil Collection to showcase some of the most important literary and artistic talents in the United States. Faculty editors past and present include Mark Doty (1999–2005), Claudia Rankine, (2006) Nick Flynn (2007–2020), francine j. harris 2020-present. The magazine publishes poetry, fiction, creative nonfiction, and translation.

Released in April and October, the print magazine has a readership of over 3,000. Gulf Coast is a student-run non-profit publication, and all of the editorial positions are two-year terms. In addition to literature, Gulf Coast explores the visual arts. Each issue features two artists, along with short essays on the work from the art editor.

In 2007, Heather McHugh chose David Shumate's Drawing Jesus, which first appeared in Gulf Coast, for The Best American Poetry 2007, and Stephen King listed Peter Bognanni's The Body Eternal and Sandra Novack's Memphis, again premiering in Gulf Coast, among the 100 Distinguished Stories in The Best American Short Stories 2007. Gulf Coast featured artists Robyn O'Neil and Amy Blakemore have been featured in the Whitney Biennial.

== History ==
The magazine was originally named Domestic Crude (1983–1985), a reference to one of the Houston area's main industries. It was a 64-page student-run publication with magazine formatting. Phillip Lopate, who contributed work to the first several issues, provided editorial guidance. In 1986, the magazine was renamed Gulf Coast: A Journal of Literature and Fine Arts.

== Gulf Coast Prize ==
Each year, the magazine presents the Gulf Coast Prizes in Poetry, Fiction, and Nonfiction. Outside judges name the winners, who each receive a $1,500 honorarium and are published in the magazine's Winter/Spring issue; two runners-up in each genre will each receive a $250 second prize. Past judges for the prizes include Eula Biss, Eavan Boland, Terrance Hayes, Susan Howe, Antonya Nelson, and Natasha Trethewey.

== Barthelme Prize ==
Gulf Coast also awards the annual Donald Barthelme Prize for Short Prose which awards $1,000 and publication to one prose poem, micro-essay, or short story of five hundred words or less. The Barthelme Prize was inaugurated by editors emeriti Sean Bishop and Laurie Cedilnik in 2008. Past judges for the Barthelme Prize include Beckian Fritz Goldberg and Mary Robison.

== Translation Prize ==
The Gulf Coast Prize in Translation, which awards $1,000 and publication, recognizes a work translated into English from another language. The prize alternates between poetry and prose each year.

== See also ==
- List of literary magazines
