= Sandra Novack =

American novelist

- Born: 1972 (age 52–53); Bethlehem, Pennsylvania, U.S.
- Occupation: Writer
- Education: Vermont College of Fine Arts (MFA)
- Genre: Literary fiction

Website
- sandranovack.com

Sandra Novack (born 1972) is an American writer of a novel and short stories. Her debut novel, Precious, was a Booklist Top 10 First Novels of 2009.

== Early life and education ==
Novack was born in Bethlehem, Pennsylvania, in 1972, to Joanne Novack, a court systems operator at Lehigh County Courthouse, and Joseph Novack, a millwright at Bethlehem Steel.

She earned an MA in literature from the University of Cincinnati in 1999. In 2003, she received her Master of Fine Arts from Vermont College of Fine Arts in Montpelier, Vermont.

== Career ==
Novack's short stories have been published in The Gettysburg Review, The Iowa Review, Gulf Coast, Descant, and Chattahoochee Review.

Stephen King named Novack's story "Memphis" a "Distinguished Story" in The Best American Short Stories, published in 2007. She has been nominated three times for a Pushcart Prize, and her nonfiction work "Hunk" was nominated as a runner-up for the 2006 Iowa Review Award, and she is a recipient of the 2010-2011 Christopher Isherwood Foundation Fellowship and 2011 Illinois Arts Council grant.

Her short story collection, Everyone But You, was published by Random House in 2011. Her work has been translated into Dutch.

== Personal life ==
Novack lives in Oak Park, Illinois.

== Works ==
=== Novels ===
- Precious (2009)

=== Short stories ===
- Everyone But You (2011)
