= Ed Skoog =

American poet (born 1971)

- Born: 1971 (age 54–55); Topeka, Kansas, U.S.
- Education: Kansas State University; University of Montana (MFA)
- Occupation: Poet

Ed Skoog (born 1971, in Topeka, Kansas) is an American poet.

== Life ==
Skoog graduated from Kansas State University, and from the University of Montana, with an MFA. He worked at the New Orleans Museum of Art and the New Orleans Center for Creative Arts. He taught at Tulane University, and the New Orleans Center for Creative Arts. He lived in southern California, where he was chair of creative writing at Idyllwild Arts Academy. He was writer-in-residence at the Hugo House. He has been the Jennie McKean Moore Writer-in-Washington Fellow at George Washington University. Most recently, he was a visiting writer at the University of Montana.

His poems have been published in Poetry, American Poetry Review, Ploughshares, Threepenny Review, and The Paris Review.

Skoog's debut collection, Mister Skylight (Copper Canyon Press, 2009), is an alert to disasters and to the hope of rescue. Interior dramas of the self play out in a clash of poetic traditions, exuberant imagery, and wild metaphor. His second book of poems, Rough Day (Copper Canyon Press, 2013), a 2013 Lannan Literary Selection, finds unity in a fixation on American events and landscapes. His newest collection, Run the Red Lights, balances the domestic and private with the exhilaration of public performance.

He was the judge for the 2019 Burnside Review Press Book Award.

== Awards ==
- 2005 Marble Faun Prize in Poetry by the Pirate’s Alley William Faulkner Society
- 2007 Lyric Poetry Award from the Poetry Society of America
- 2012 Lannan Foundation Residency Fellowship

== Works ==
- Run The Red Lights. Copper Canyon Press. 2016. ISBN 978-1-55659-503-5.
- Rough Day. Copper Canyon Press. 2013. ISBN 978-1-55659-434-2.
- Mister Skylight. Copper Canyon Press. 2009. ISBN 978-1-55659-293-5.
- King of Sweden: poems. University of Montana. 1996.
- "West Coast", Narrative, Summer 2009
- "Little Song", Narrative
- "Like Night Catching Jackrabbits in Its Barbed Wire", American Poetry Review, Vol. 37 No. 2
- "The Reinvention of Suffering", Body, August 2012.
