= Kazim Ali =

American poet, novelist, essayist, and professor (born 1971)

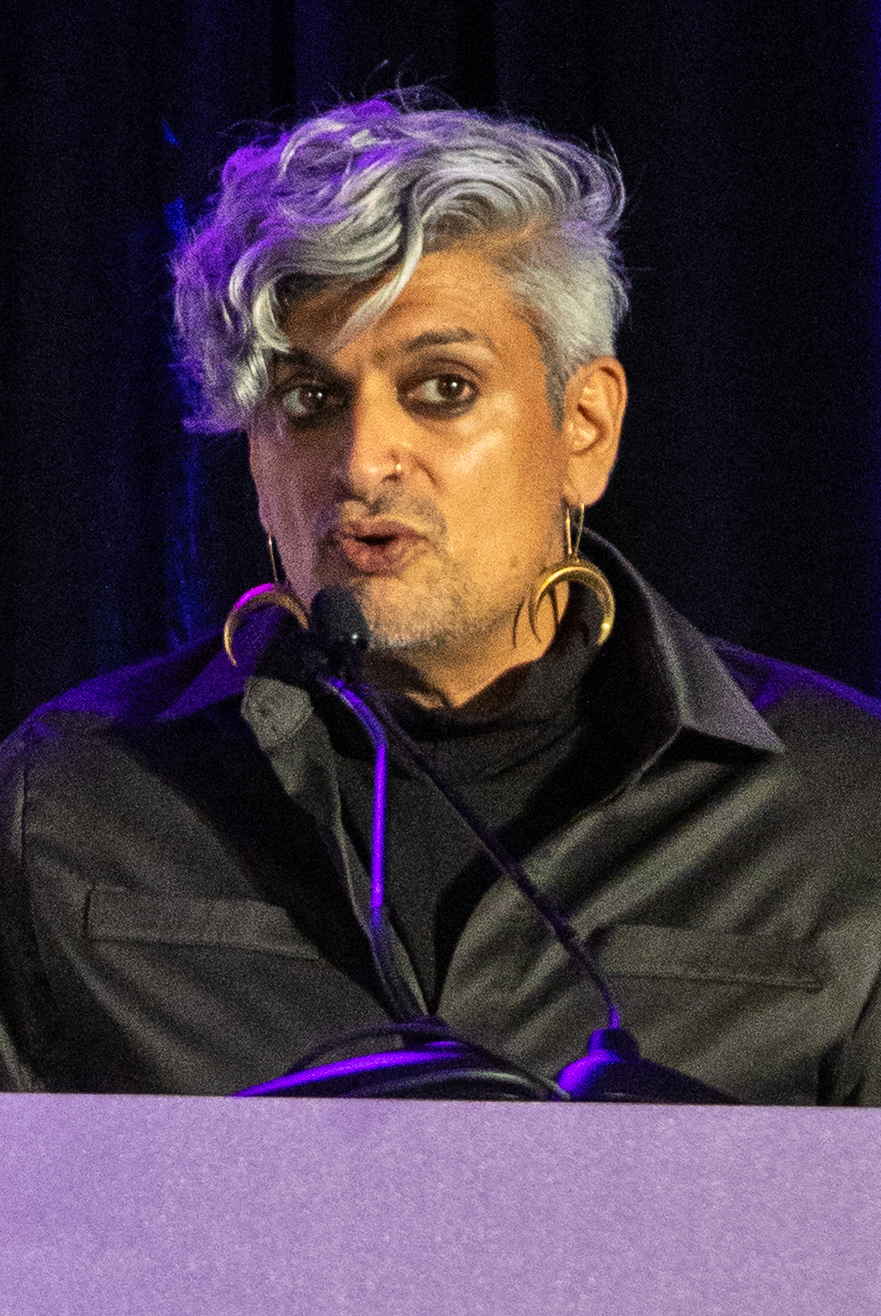
- Ali at AWP 2025
- Born: April 5, 1971 (age 55); United Kingdom
- Education: University at Albany, SUNY (BA, MA); New York University (MFA)
- Writing career
- Genre: poetry

Kazim Ali (born April 5, 1971) is an American poet, novelist, essayist, and professor. His most recent books are Inquisition (Wesleyan University Press, 2018) and All One's Blue (Harper Collins India, 2016). His honors include an Individual Excellence Award from the Ohio Arts Council. His poetry and essays have appeared in literary journals and magazines including The American Poetry Review, Boston Review, Barrow Street, Jubilat, The Iowa Review, West Branch and Massachusetts Review, and in The Best American Poetry 2007.

== Life ==
Kazim Ali was born in the UK to parents of Indian descent, and raised in Canada and the United States. He received B.A. and M.A. degrees in English Literature from the University at Albany, and an MFA in creative writing from New York University.

In 2003, he co-founded the independent press Nightboat Books, served as its publisher from 2004 to 2007, and currently serves as a founding editor.

Ali is professor of literature and creative Writing at University of California, San Diego, and has taught in the Stonecoast MFA Program in Creative Writing at the University of Southern Maine. Previously, he taught in the Liberal Arts Department of The Culinary Institute of America, at Shippensburg University of Pennsylvania, at Monroe College, and at Oberlin College.

== Awards and honors ==
- 2009: Individual Excellence Award from the Ohio Arts Council
- 2014: Best Translated Book Award, poetry, one of two runners-up for The Oasis of Now by Sohrab Sepehri, translated from the Persian by Kazim Ali and Mohammad Jafar Mahallati
- 2014: Ohioana Book Award in poetry for Sky Ward

== Published works ==
Poetry

- The Far Mosque (Alice James Books, 2005)
- The Fortieth Day (BOA Editions, Ltd., 2008)
- Bright Felon (Wesleyan University Press, 2009)
- Sky Ward (Wesleyan University Press, 2013)
- All One's Blue (HarperCollins India, 2016)
- Inquisition (Wesleyan University Press, 2018)

Fiction

- Quinn's Passage (BlazeVOX Books, 2004)
- The Disappearance of Seth (Etruscan Press, 2009)
- Wind Instrument (Spork Press, 2014)
- Uncle Sharif's Life in Music (Sibling Rivalry Press, 2016)
- The Secret Room (Kaya Press, 2017)

Nonfiction

- Orange Alert: Essays on Poetry, Art and the Architecture of Silence (University of Michigan Press, 2010)
- Fasting for Ramadan: Notes on a Spiritual Practice (Tupelo Press, 2011)
- Resident Alien: On Border-Crossing and the Undocumented Divine (University of Michigan Press, 2015)
- Anaïs Nin: An Unprofessional Study (Agape Editions, 2017)
- Silver Road: Essays, Maps & Calligraphies (Tupelo Press, 2018)
- Northern Light: Power, Land, and the Memory of Water (Goose Lane Editions / Milkweed Editions, 2021)

Translations

- Water's Footfall, Poems of Sohrab Sepehri, translated by Kazim Ali and Mohammad Jafar Mahallati (Omnidawn Press, 2011). ISBN 978-1-890650-55-1.
- The Oasis of Now, Poems of Sohrab Sepehri, translated from the Persian by Kazim Ali and Mohammad Jafar Mahallati (BOA, 2013). ISBN 9781938160226.
- L'Amour by Marguerite Duras (Open Letter Books, 2013)
- Abahn Sabana David by Marguerite Duras (Open Letter Books, 2016)

== Anthologies ==
- Mad Heart Be Brave: Essays on the Poetry of Agha Shahid Ali (University of Michigan Press, 2017)
