= Thomas Fink (poet) =

American poet

- Born: Thomas Fink; 1954 (age 71–72)
- Known for: poetry, literary criticism

Thomas Fink (born 1954) is a poet and literary critic. He is the author of 13 books of poetry, two books of criticism, and a literature anthology, and he has co-edited two critical anthologies. He was featured in the 2007 edition of Scribner's The Best American Poetry. Fink is a professor of English at City University of New York—LaGuardia.

== Works ==
=== Books of Poetry ===
- A Pageant for Every Addiction. Marsh Hawk Press. 2020
- Hedge Fund Certainty Meritage Press and I. e. Press. 2019.
- Selected Poems & Poetic Series. Marsh Hawk Press. 2016.
- Joyride. Marsh Hawk Press. 2013.
- Peace Conference. Marsh Hawk Press. 2011.
- Autopsy Turvy. Meritage Press. 2010.
- Clarity and Other Poems. Marsh Hawk Press. 2008.
- No Appointment Necessary. Moria Poetry. 2006.
- After Taxes. Marsh Hawk Press. 2004.
- Gossip. Marsh Hawk Press. 2001.
- Surprise Visit. Domestic Press. 1993.
- Or Current Resident. Marsh Hawk Press. 2025.
- Zeugma. Marsh Hawk Press. 2025.

=== Books of Criticism and Edited Books ===
- Reading the Difficulties: Dialogues with Contemporary American Innovative Poetry. University of Alabama Press. 2014.
- "Burning Interiors": David Shapiro's Poetry and Poetics. Fairleigh Dickinson University Press. 2007.
- "A Different Sense of Power": Problems of Community in Late Twentieth-Century U.S. Poetry. Fairleigh Dickinson University Press. 2001.
- Literature around the Globe. Kendall/Hunt. 1994.
- The Poetry of David Shapiro. Fairleigh Dickinson University Press. 1993.
- Reading Poetry with College and University Students: Overcoming Barriers and Deepening Engagement. Bloomsbury Academic. 2022.
