= Rod Smith (poet) =

American poet, editor and publisher (born 1962)

- Born: 1962 (age 63–64); Gallipolis, Ohio, U.S.
- Writing career
- Genre: poetry

Rod Smith (born 1962) is an American poet, editor and publisher.

== Life ==
He was born in Gallipolis, Ohio. He grew up in Northern Virginia and moved to Washington, D.C., in 1987. Smith has authored several collections of poetry, including In Memory of My Theories, Protective Immediacy, and Music or Honesty. He has taught creative writing at George Mason University where he is finishing his MFA. Smith currently teaches Cultural Studies at Towson University, and was a visiting writer at the Iowa Writers' Workshop in the Spring of 2010. Smith is co-editor of The Selected Letters of Robert Creeley, along with Kaplan Harris and Peter Baker (University of California Press, 2014).

== Publishing and the DC poetry community ==
In 1984, along with Wayne Kline, Rod Smith began the journal Aerial Magazine, a poetry magazine devoted to avant-garde and experimental writing. Soon after, Smith began publishing books under the name EDGE Books. Smith published the first Edge Book in 1989.

After Rod Smith moved to Washington, D.C., in 1987, he became part of the DC poetry community which included the writers Tina Darragh, Lynne Dreyer, P. Inman, Doug Lang, Joan Retallack, Phyllis Rosenzweig, and others. This group expanded over the years to include such writers as Leslie Bumstead, Jean Donnelly, Buck Downs, Cathy Eisenhower, Heather Fuller, Mark McMorris, Carol Mirakove, Maureen Thorson, Ryan Walker, Mel Nichols, Tom Orange, and Mark Wallace.

During the 1980s Smith began intense self-study in poetry and poetics, particularly Ezra Pound, Gertrude Stein, William Carlos Williams, John Ashbery, Frank O'Hara, and George Oppen. He met John Cage in Rockville, Maryland in 1987 and saw him regularly, playing chess (usually losing), in Washington and New York until Cage's death in 1992.

Smith’s own poetry is written, as Lisa Jarnot writes, “With the sweeping vision of Whitman, the noun-play of Gertrude Stein, and the slant political commentary of the New York School”.

Smith managed Bick's Books from 1989 to 1992 and since 1993 has managed Bridge Street Books in Washington. While at Bick's and as a founding curator with Buck Downs, Joe Ross, and Sylvana Straw of the DCAC "In Your Ear" series he organized readings for Charles Bernstein, Cage, Kevin Davies, Carolyn Forche, Bob Perelman, Tom Raworth, Leslie Scalapino, Diane Ward, and others.

== Books ==
=== Poetry ===
- "Touché", (Wave Books, 2015)
- Deed, (Iowa City, IA: University of Iowa Press, 2007) ISBN 9781587296192
- Fear the Sky, (narrow house, 2005)
- Music or Honesty, (New York: Roof Books, 2003). ISBN 9781931824071
- Poèmes de l'araignée, (Bordeaux, France: Un bureau sur l'atlantique, 2003).
- The Good House (New York: Spectacular Books, 2001)
- The New Mannerist Tricycle - with Lisa Jarnot & Bill Luoma (Philadelphia: Beautiful Swimmer, 2000)
- Protective Immediacy (New York: Roof, 1999)
- The Lack (love poems, targets, flags...) (Elmwood, CT.: Abacus, 1997).
- In Memory of My Theories (Oakland: O Books, 1996) ISBN 9781882022298
- A Grammar Manikan, Object 5: featuring Rod Smith, (New York, NY: Object, 1995).
- The Boy Poems, (Washington, DC: Buck Downs Books, 1994). ISBN 9781886353015

=== in Anthologies ===
- "A Tract," in "Telling It Slant: Avant-Garde Poetics of the 1990s", ed Mark Wallace and Steven Marks, (Tuscaloosa: University of Alabama Press, 2002).
- Four poems from In Memory of My Theories and Protective Immediacy, in Antologija novije americke poezije, ed. Dubravka Djuric et al. (Serbia: Oktoih, 2001).
- "Ted's Head," in 100 Days, ed. Andrea Brady and Keston Sutherland, (Cambridge, UK: Barque Press, 2001).
- “4 poems from In Memory of My Theories,” in New (American) Poetry, ed. Lisa Jarnot, Leonard Schwartz, and Chris Stroffolino, (Hoboken, NJ: Talisman House, 1997).
- "from CIA Sentences," in A Poetics of Criticism, ed. Juliana Spahr, Mark Wallace, Kristen Prevallet, and Pam Rehm, (Buffalo: Leave Books, 1994).
- “XCII (cinder-sifter)” and poetics statement, in o blek 12: Writing from the New Coast, ed. Peter Gizzi, Connell McGrath, and Juliana Spahr, (Stockbridge: The Garlic Press,1993).
