= Joanie Mackowski =

American poet and teacher, born 1963

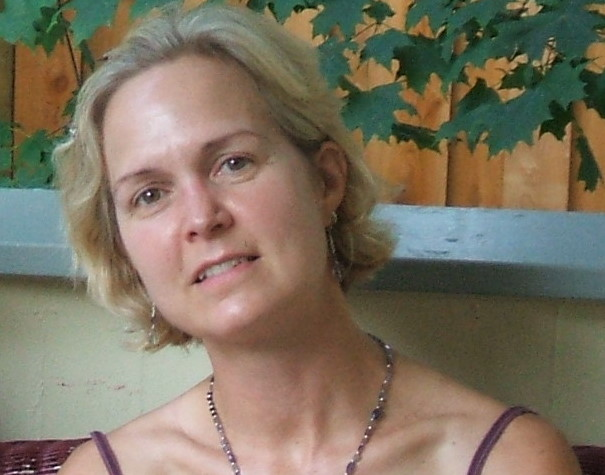
- Born: 1963 (age 62–63); Illinois, U.S.
- Education: Wesleyan University; University of Washington; University of Missouri (PhD)
- Occupation: Poet
- Writing career
- Notable awards: Kate Tufts Discovery Award (2003); Writer Magazine/Emily Dickinson Award (2008)

Joanie V. Mackowski (born 1963, in Illinois) is an American poet. She has published three volumes of poetry, and her works have won multiple awards. She taught creative writing on the faculty of the English department of Cornell University.

== Early life and education ==
Born in Illinois in 1963, Mackowski grew up in Darien, Connecticut.

She completed a B.A. in English at Wesleyan University. At the University of Washington she earned both an M.F.A. in English (Poetry) in 1991, and also an M.A. in English in 1993. She was a Stegner Fellow in Poetry at Stanford University.

In 2004 Mackowski earned a Ph.D. at the University of Missouri Columbia with three emphases: creative writing (poetry); American poetry (19th and 20th centuries); and history of poetics. Her dissertation was titled Conversation Pieces: original poems, with an introductory chapter, "Rethinking Poetic Voice".

== Career ==
In Mackowski's early career, she held adjunct professorships at Seattle Central Community College, from 1995–1996; Roger Williams University, Portsmouth, Rhode Island, from 1997 – 1998; and Stanford University's writing and critical thinking department in 2000. Mackowski was a graduate fellow at the University of Missouri–Columbia's English department from 2000 – 2004, and was as an assistant professor in English and comparative literature at the University of Cincinnati's McMicken College from 2004 – 2010.

At the University of Missouri, Mackowski taught in a new service-learning program, exploring how the arts spark social change:

When Mackowski taught creative writing and service learning she didn't require her students to write poetry about their experiences. Instead she wanted them to think about art in a larger context. "I like to teach them to let their exploration with language lead them to a subject rather than start with the subject and try to poeticize it," she says. "So what we ended up thinking about was the relationship between poetry and society."

— Jenna Kaegel

In 2010 Mackowski accepted an assistant professor position in the English department at Cornell University. In 2013 she was promoted to an associate professorship with tenure, teaching creative writing. She has since retired from teaching.

Mackowski has also been an editor at Reconfigurations, and her work has appeared in Prairie Schooner and The Antioch Review. Her poem, "When I was a dinosaur", was listed in The Best American Poetry 2007; "Boarding: Hamaris thysbe", by Mackowski, was listed in The Best American Poetry 2009.

== Awards, honors ==
- 2008 Poetry Society of America's Emily Dickinson Award
- 2003 Kate Tufts Discovery Award, $10,000 award for an emerging "poet of promise."
- 2000 Award Series in Poetry Associated Writing Programs
- 2000 Rona Jaffe Foundation Grant, Rona Jaffe Foundation
- 2000 Wallace Stegner Fellowship, Stanford University
- 2000 Donald Hall Prize for Poetry

== Publications ==
=== Books ===
- Mackowski, Joanie (2002). The Zoo (Pitt Poetry Series) (Kindle ed.). University of Pittsburgh Press. ISBN 082295768X.
- Mackowski., Joanie (2004). Tails (poems). University of Missouri-Columbia.
- Mackowski, Joanie (2010). View from a Temporary Window (Pitt Poetry Series). University of Missouri-Columbia. ISBN 978-0822960553.

=== Poems ===
- "Bad Annunciation", Slate, Sept. 4, 2007
- "Ants". Poetry. April 2000.
- "Iceberg Lettuce". Poetry. January 1999.
- "One Afternoon". Poetry. July–August 2007.
- "Tea Party". Poetry. July 2006.

=== Anthologies ===
- Heather McHugh, David Lehman, ed. (2007). "When I was a dinosaur". The Best American Poetry 2007. Simon and Schuster. ISBN 978-0-7432-9972-5.
- David Wagoner, David Lehman, eds. "Boarding: Hemaris thysbe", The Best American Poetry 2009, Simon & Schuster, ISBN 978-0-7432-9977-0
- David Yezzi, ed. Five Poems. The Swallow Anthology of New American Poets, OUP/Swallow Press, 2009, ISBN 978-0-8040-1121-1

== Reviews ==
Richard Kenney wrote:

Here's wildness and art, in right proportion: the wildness is surprise without swagger; the art is graceful and mostly disappearing, and otherwise a little extravagant. As in the case of jugglery (another of Joanie Mackowski's mastered arts), loopiness is nothing without the catch. Dropped clubs, flat cakes, flat notes--where but in poetry is a native gift for clumsiness, sedulously conserved, so praised?
