= Kate Colby =

American writer

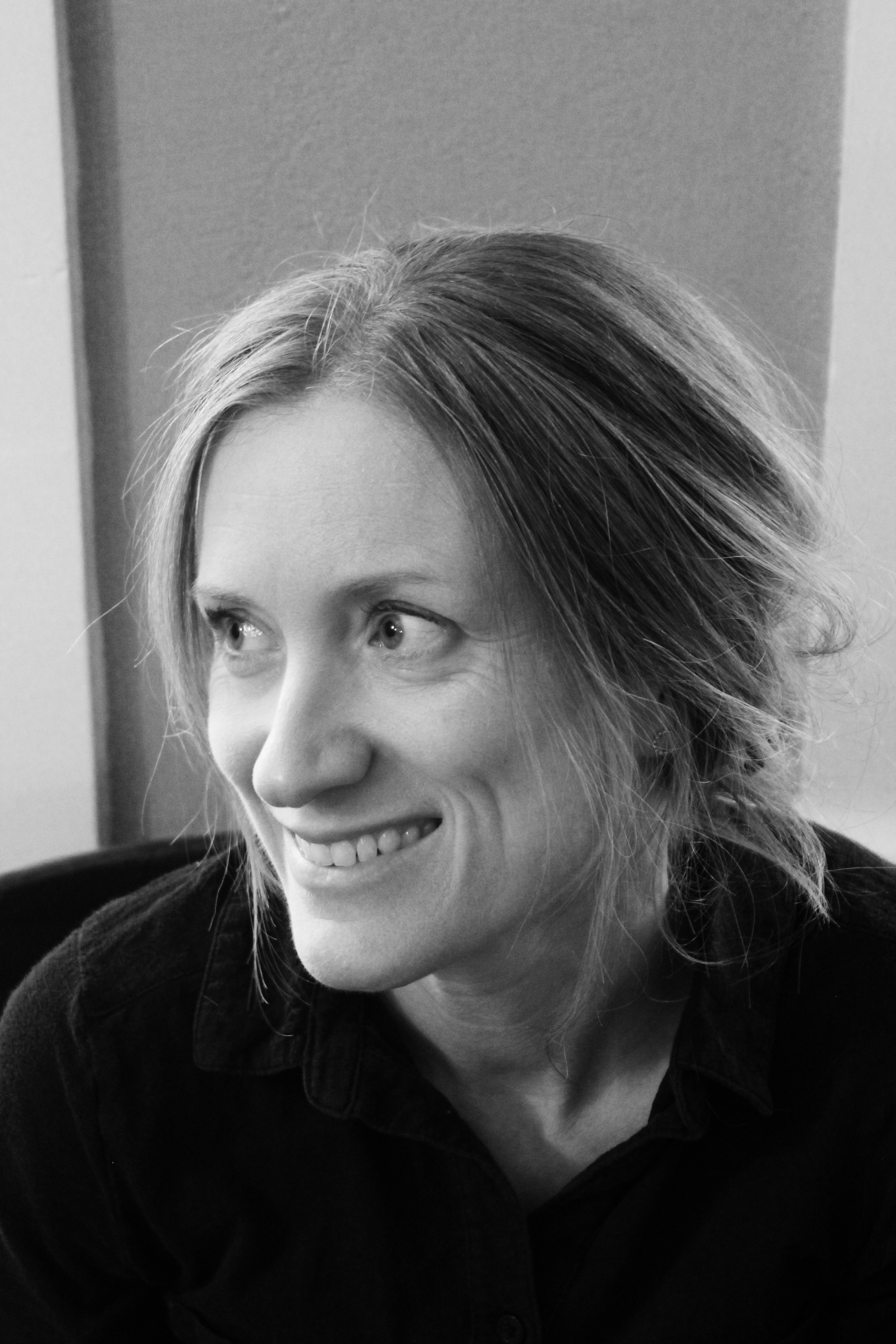
- Colby in 2016
- Born: 1974 (age 51–52); Boston, Massachusetts
- Education: Wesleyan University (B.A.); California College of the Arts (M.F.A.)
- Occupations: Poet; essayist

Kate Colby (born 1974, Boston) is an American poet and essayist. She grew up in Massachusetts and received her undergraduate degree from Wesleyan University and an MFA from California College of the Arts. She worked for several years as a curator at Yerba Buena Center for the Arts, on the board of The LAB art space, and later as a grant writer and copyeditor. Her first poetry collection, Fruitlands (2006), won the Norma Farber First Book Award from the Poetry Society of America and her third book, Beauport (2015), was a finalist for Foreword Reviews' Poetry Book of the Year Award. Her poems and essays have appeared in Conjunctions, Harper's, Literary Hub, The Nation, The Paris Review and Poetry, among other journals and periodicals, and has been featured at the RISD, deCordova and Isabella Stewart Gardner museums. She lives in Providence, Rhode Island and teaches poetry at University of Pennsylvania.

== Awards and Fellowships ==
- 2007 Norma Farber First Book Award, Fruitlands. Selected by Rosmarie Waldrop.
- 2011 Finalist for Foreword Reviews' Poetry Book of the Year Award for Beauport
- 2013 Fellowship in Poetry, Rhode Island State Council for the Arts
- 2017 Strochlitz Research Grant, Thomas J. Dodd Research Center, University of Connecticut
- 2017-2018 Woodberry Poetry Room Creative Fellowship, Harvard University

== Works ==
=== Poetry Collections ===
- Fruitlands. Litmus Press. 2006. ISBN 978-0-9723331-9-1.
- Unbecoming Behavior. Ugly Duckling Presse. 2008. ISBN 978-1-933254-40-1.
- Beauport. Litmus Press. 2010. ISBN 978-1-933959-11-5.
- The Return of the Native. Ugly Duckling Presse. 2011. ISBN 978-1-933254-77-7.
- Blue Hole. Furniture Press. 2015. ISBN 978-1-940092-11-9.
- I Mean. Ugly Duckling Presse. 2015. ISBN 978-1-937027-45-2.
- The Arrangements. Four Way. 2018. ISBN 978-1-945588-21-1.
- Reverse Engineer. Ornithopter. 2022. ISBN 978-1-942723-12-7.

Essay Collections

- Dream of the Trenches. Noemi Press. 2019. ISBN 978-1-934819-80-7.
- Paradoxx. Essay Press. 2025. ISBN 979-8-9861352-8-1.
