= Robbie Benoit =

Canadian writer

Cover of Robbie Benoit's Tall Yukon Tales

Robbie Benoit (?–2007) was a Canadian poet and writer. A longtime resident of Whitehorse, Yukon, he is best known for his Tall Yukon Tales.

Benoit was born in northwestern Quebec. After moving to the Yukon as a young man, he worked for many years in the mining industry. After a fall down a mineshaft at Ketza River, he quit mining and left the Yukon. Shortly after this he took up dog breeding and showing, and won Best of Breed at the Westminster in 2001 with his Komondor named Oscar.

He first released his CD Tall Yukon Tales, a collection of original verse about life in the Yukon, on November 18, 2004.

In 2005, he was diagnosed with cancer of the gall bladder, which then spread to his brain. Later that year, his cancer had gone into remission, and on December 16, 2005, he recorded a program called "To Hell with Cancer" alongside several other Whitehorse entertainers which was later broadcast on CBC Radio's Sounds Like Canada. (He had initially wanted to call the show "Cancer Can Kiss My Ass" but changed it after host Shelagh Rogers indicated this title would probably be unsuitable for broadcast on the radio.)

In 2007, his cancer returned and spread to his liver, and was diagnosed as terminal. On March 30, 2007, he recorded a program "To Hell With Cancer Part Deux" in Whitehorse, also appearing on Sounds Like Canada, as a fundraiser to record another album before his death. On this program, Shelagh Rogers inducted him as the first member of the "Order of Sounds Like Canada" (a semi-humorous reference to the Order of Canada).

Benoit died on August 24, 2007, At 8:15 am.
