= Ahadada Books =

Ahadada Books Logo

Ahadada Books is a small press based in Tokyo, Japan and Toronto, Ontario, Canada, specializing in new and experimental poetry and prose. Established in 1998 by Jesse Glass, it includes such authors as Alan Halsey, Geraldine Monk, Eileen Tabios, Yoko Danno, Jack Foley, Skip Fox, David B. Axelrod, Jonathan Chaves (professor), Grace Ocasio, Phillip Terry, Simon Perchik, Hugh Seidman, Richard Peabody, Jim Daniels, Rane Arroyo, Pierre Joris, Dayana Stetco, Jerome Rothenberg, Burton Watson, Lou Rowan, Tom Bradley, Tom Clark, Michael Heller, Don Wellman, among others.

Fluxus, Performance Art, Plays, Mail Art, Concrete poetry and Haptic Poetry as well as text-based work are part of the publishing agenda of the press.

Ahadada Books also publishes translations from Asian languages and Sino-Japanese related materials. African-American and Native American authors will also be featured in their publications.

In 2009, Ahadada Books established the on-line literary review Ekleksographia, which features a revolving editorship.
