= Maurya Simon =

American poet, essayist, and visual artist

Maurya Simon (born December 7, 1950) is an American poet, essayist, and visual artist. She is the author of ten collections of poetry. Her most recent volume of poetry is The Wilderness: New and Selected Poems (Red Hen Press, 2018).

== Early life and education ==
Born in New York City, Simon is the daughter of the Los Angeles visual artist, Baila Goldenthal, and the ethnomusicologist and composer, Robert Leopold Simon. She spent her early years living in Europe with her family, and later moved to Hermosa Beach in southern California, where she lived from 1959–1968. Simon attended the University of California, Berkeley (1968–1971), where she was a student of Robert Grenier, Angela Davis, and Richard Tillinghast. She later received a B.A. from Pitzer College (1980), where she studied with Bert Meyers. At UC Irvine, Simon studied with Charles Wright and earned an M.F.A. in English Literature and Poetry in 1984.

== Personal life ==
Simon married Robert Falk, a behavioral therapist, in 1973. They have two children. She currently serves as a Professor of the Graduate Division and a Professor Emerita at the University of California, Riverside. Simon has lived for over thirty years in the Angeles National Forest of the San Gabriel Mountains in southern California.

== Early influences and career ==
As a child, surrounded by the friends of her parents who were artists, writers, dancers, and musicians, Simon was steeped in an enriching culture of the arts. She has said that growing up with a mother who was a painter and sculptor, and a father, who was a composer, musician, and music scholar, deeply influenced her writing by instilling in her an understanding that poetry is both a vocal and imagistic art. Simon's study of the violin for ten years (1955–1965) reinforced her conviction that the human body and voice contain and rhythmically express the music of language. Her mother's visual art inspired Simon to become an artist herself, and it also heightened her sense of how a poem's visual imagery creates a kind of magnetic force field for all aspects of the work.

Simon's poetry is also influenced by the two years (1970–1971 and 1990–1991) during which she lived and studied in Chennai and Bangalore, South India, and where she studied Hinduism, classical Tamil, and yoga with famed yogi, T.K.V. Desikachar. She also lectured about contemporary American poetry at Bangalore University in 1991, as well as serving in 2006 as a University of California visiting poet and faculty member at Lund University in southern Sweden.

Simon's poems have appeared in more than two hundred literary magazines and journals, including Poetry, The New Yorker, The Georgia Review, The Gettysburg Review, The Los Angeles Times Book Review, The Hudson Review, Ploughshares, The Kenyon Review, Grand Street, Orion, Salmagundi, TriQuarterly, Prairie Schooner, and The Southern Review. Her work has also appeared in over two dozen poetry anthologies, including Garrison Keillor's More Good Poems (for Hard Times), W.W Norton, 2005.

Maurya Simon has published nine books of poetry. Her first two volumes were published to much acclaim by Copper Canyon Press in 1986 and 1989. Her third volume won the annual Peregrine (Gibbs) Smith Poetry Award in 1989. She has published three subsequent volumes of poetry with Red Hen Press in Los Angeles, including Ghost Orchid, which was nominated for a National Book Award. Simon received a National Endowment for the Arts award in 2000, the same year during which the University of Georgia Press published her long poetic suite, A Brief History of Punctuation, in a distinguished chapbook series. Elixir Press published her novel in verse, The Raindrop's Gospel, in 2010. Her most recent book of poetry, The Wilderness, New & Selected Poems, is forthcoming from Red Hen Press in 2018.

== List of publications ==
- The Enchanted Room (1986) Copper Canyon Press
- Days of Awe (1989) Copper Canyon Press
- Speaking in Tongues (1990) Gibbs Smith Books
- The Golden Labyrinth (1995) University of Missouri Press
- A Brief History of Punctuation (2002) Sutton Hoo Press
- Ghost Orchid (2004) Red Hen Press
- Weavers (2005) Blackbird Press
- Cartographies, Uncollected Poems, 1980-2005 (2008) Red Hen Press
- The Raindrop's Gospel: The Trials of St. Jerome & St. Paula (2010) Elixir Press
- Questions My Daughters Asked Me, Answers I Never Gave Them (2014) Blackbird Press
- The Wilderness: New & Selected Poems, 1980-2016 (2018) Red Hen Press

== Honors and awards ==
- Visiting Artist, American Academy in Rome, 2002 & 2007
- Fellow, Vermont Studio Center, 2005
- Nominee, National Book Award in Poetry, 2004
- Fellow, Djerassi Resident Artists Program, 2006
- Fellow, The MacDowell Colony, 2001, 1999
- Univ. of Calif. Faculty Exchange: Lund University, Sweden, 2000
- NEA Fellowship in Poetry 1999-2000
- Fellow, Baltic Center for Writers & Translators, Visby, Sweden, 1997
- Fellow, Hawthornden Castle, Edinburgh, Scotland, 1995
- Mary Caroline Davies Award, 1993, & Celia B. Wagner Award, 1994, Poetry Society of America
- Fellow, Center for Ideas & Society, U.C. Riverside, 1993
- Fulbright/Indo-American Fellowship, 1990–91
- Nominee for 1991 McArthur Fellowship
- Peregrine Smith Poetry Award, 1989
- Nominee, Lamont Prize, Academy of American Poets, 1989
- Roberts Writing Award, 1989
- First Prize, SCCA International Poetry Contest, 1987
- Emerging Writer Award, 1987
- First Prize, National Federation of State Poetry Societies, 1984
- University Award, Academy of American Poets, 1984
