= Arthur Vogelsang =

American poet, teacher and editor (born 1942)

Arthur Vogelsang (born January 31, 1942) is an American poet, teacher and editor.

== Early life and education ==
Vogelsang was born in 1942 in Baltimore, Maryland. He received an MA from the Writing Seminars at Johns Hopkins University where he met his future wife, filmmaker Judith Ayers. He lived in New York City from 1966–68, and worked as an Editing Supervisor for the McGraw-Hill Book Company in College Textbooks and the International Division. In 1970 he earned an MFA from the Iowa Writers Workshop.

== Literary career ==
Vogelsang has written seven books of poetry. In 1983 he published A Planet. Next came Twentieth Century Women in 1988, which was included in John Ashbery's Contemporary Poetry Series., Cities and Towns was published in 1996, and won the Juniper Prize. In 2003 he released Left Wing of a Bird, and later in 2011 Expedition: New & Selected Poems.

Vogelsang's poetry appears in a number of anthologies, including The Best American Poetry, The Pushcart Prize, and the Norton anthology American Hybrid. His work has been published in Boston Review, The New Yorker, and Poetry; and online at Evergreen Review, Plume, and Zocalo Public Square.

He was an editor/publisher of The American Poetry Review from 1973-2006. With Stephen Berg and David Bonanno, Vogelsang edited the anthology The Body Electric, America’s Best Poetry from The American Poetry Review, (W.W. Norton & Co., 2000), with an introduction by Harold Bloom.

Vogelsang started his own publishing company, Metro Book Co., in 1983, and published poet Gerald Stern’s Rejoicings in 1984, and Michael Burkard’s The Fires They Kept, in 1986. The company operated until 2002.

Between 1971 and 1980, Vogelsang, Jonathan Katz and A.G. Sobin edited a literary quarterly, The Ark River Review, from Wichita, Kansas, and published the work of many authors, including Kenneth Rexroth, Donald Justice, Mark Doty, Ted Kooser, Stephen Dunn, Gerard Malanga, Albert Goldbarth, Michael Ryan, James Tate, and William Stafford.

Vogelsang has taught at the University of Nevada MFA/PhD Program, University of Southern California, University of Redlands, Kansas Arts Commission Workshops, and the University of Iowa Writers’ Workshops.

He lives in Los Angeles with his wife Judith.

== Books ==
- Orbit (University of Pittsburgh Press, 2016)
- Expedition: New & Selected Poems (The Ashland Poetry Press, 2011)
- Left Wing of a Bird (Sarabande Books, 2003)
- Cities and Towns (University of Massachusetts Press, 1996; awarded the Juniper Prize)
- Twentieth Century Women (University of Georgia Press, 1988; selected by John Ashbery for the Contemporary Poets Series)
- A Planet (Holt, Rinehart & Winston, 1983)

== Awards ==
- The Best American Poetry (Scribner, 2007)
- National Endowment for the Arts Fellowship in Poetry, 1996
- Juniper Prize, University of Massachusetts Press, 1996
- California Arts Council Fellowship in Poetry, 1995
- Pushcart Prize, 1995
- The Best American Poetry (Scribner, 1995)
- Winner of the University of Georgia Press Contemporary Poets Series, 1988
- National Endowment for the Arts Fellowship in Poetry, 1985
- National Endowment for the Arts Fellowship in Poetry, 1976
