= Gregory Orr (poet) =

American poet (born 1947)

Gregory Orr (born 1947 in Albany, New York, United States) is an American poet.

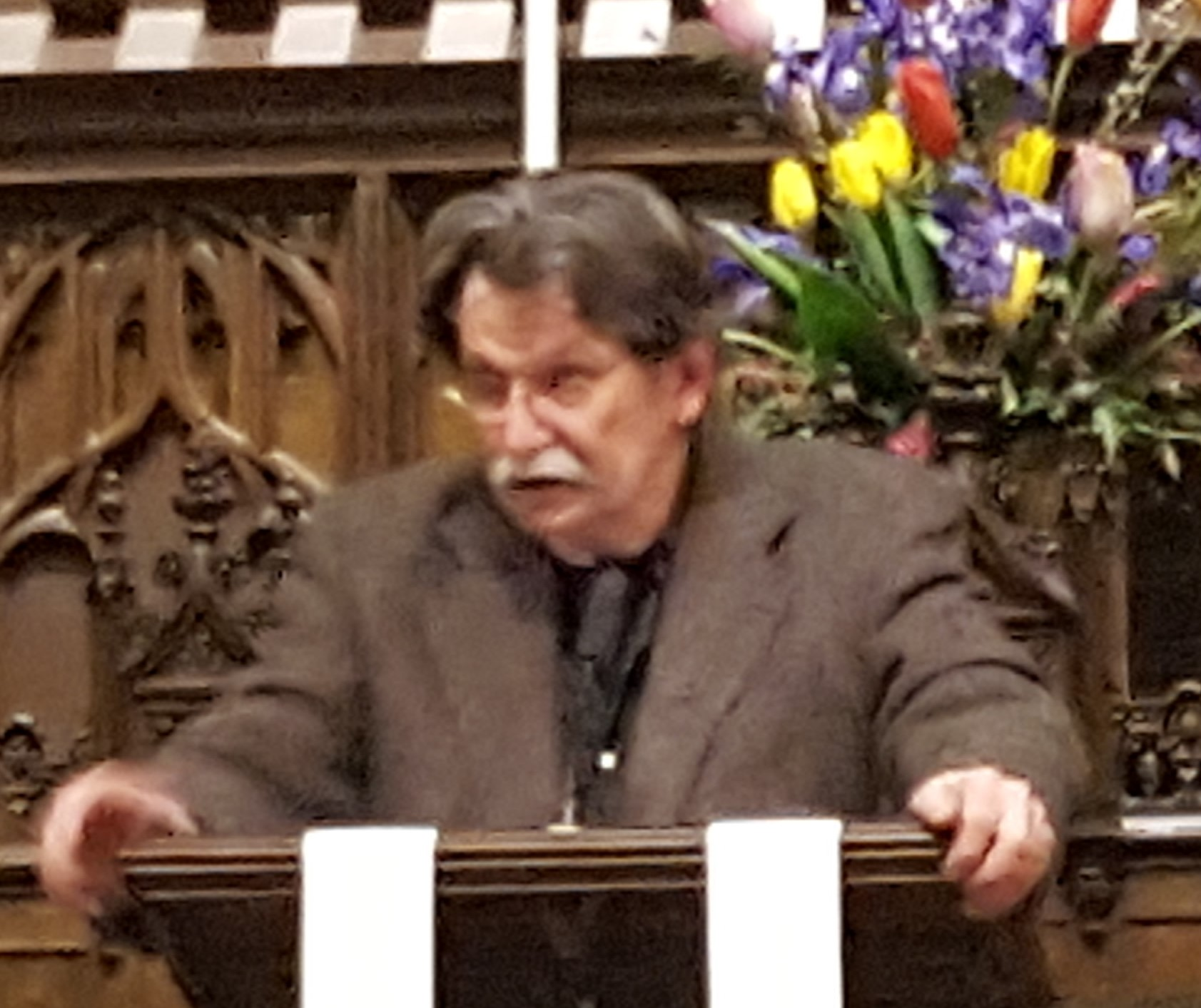
Gregory Orr speaking at Plymouth Congregational Church in Minneapolis, Minnesota on Monday, April 9, 2018.

Featured on National Public Radio's This I Believe, Orr has been the recipient of John Simon Guggenheim Memorial Foundation's Guggenheim Fellowship and the National Endowment for the Arts's fellowship, and of Award in Literature from the American Academy of Arts and Letters.

In 2014 he published an opinion piece in the Sunday Magazine of The New York Times about accidentally killing his younger brother in a hunting accident when he (Orr) was twelve years old, which he wrote in response to the fatal shooting with an Uzi machine gun of a gun instructor by a 9 year old in Arizona.

== Selected works ==
=== Poetry ===
- Burning the Empty Nests (Harper & Row, 1973)
- Gathering the Bones Together (Harper & Row, 1975)
- The Red House (Harper & Row, 1980)
- We Must Make a Kingdom of It (Wesleyan University Press, 1986)
- New and Selected Poems (Wesleyan University Press, 1988)
- City of Salt (University of Pittsburgh Press, 1995)
- Orpheus & Eurydice (Copper Canyon Press, 2001)
- The Caged Owl: New and Selected Poems (Copper Canyon Press, 2002)
- Concerning the Book That Is the Body of the Beloved (Copper Canyon Press, 2005)
- How Beautiful the Beloved (Copper Canyon Press, 2009)
- River Inside the River (W. W. Norton & Company, 2013)
- The Last Love Poem I Will Ever Write (W. W. Norton & Company, 2019)
- Selected Books of the Beloved (Copper Canyon Press, 2023)

=== Criticism ===
- A Primer for Poets and Readers of Poetry (W.W. Norton & Company, 2018)
- Stanley Kunitz: An Introduction to Poetry (Columbia University Press, 1985)
- Richer Entanglements: Essays and Notes on Poetry and Poems (University of Michigan Press, 1993)
- Poets Teaching Poets: Self and the World (University of Michigan Press, 1996) (edited by Voigt and Orr)
- Poetry as Survival (University of Georgia Press, 2002)

=== Memoir ===
- The Blessing (Milkweed Editions, 2019 revised reissue)
