= Milton Kessler =

Milton Kessler (1930-2000) was a poet and academic who spent most of his career at Binghamton University. He was one of the founders of the institution's creative writing program.

== Life ==
Born in Brooklyn, New York, Kessler grew up in New York City in a Jewish family. He was a volunteer spear carrier and prop boy at the New York Metropolitan Opera as a teenager, and he had classical training as a singer. He worked selling cloth at The Sample in Buffalo, New York as a young adult, and he married his wife, Sonia, while working a range of modest jobs.

He received his Bachelor of Arts from the University at Buffalo (later subsumed by the State University of New York) in 1957. Following non-degree graduate studies at Harvard University during the 1957–1958 academic year, he moved to the University of Washington, where he briefly served as a teaching assistant and received his Master of Arts in English in 1962. From 1958 to 1963, he was an assistant instructor and doctoral student in English at Ohio State University, where he was informally mentored by John Crowe Ransom of nearby Kenyon College. During this period, Ransom recommended Kessler for a Robert Frost Fellowship in poetry at the Bread Loaf Writers' Conference in the summer of 1961.

After publishing his first collection of poetry in 1963, he abandoned his doctoral studies. A lectureship in English at Queens College (1963-1965) led to a tenure-track post at Binghamton University as an associate professor of English in 1965; there, his students included 1968 class valedictorian and future public intellectual Camille Paglia. Paglia later wrote that the biggest impact on her thinking were the classes taught by Kessler:

The way I was trained to read literature by Milton Kessler, who was a student of Theodore Roethke, he believed in the responsiveness of the body, and of the activation of the senses to literature. And oh did I believe in that. Probably from my Italian background -- that's the way we respond to things, with our body. From Michelangelo, Bernini, there's this whole florid physicality leading right down to the Grand Opera, the great arias.

In 1968, he signed an anti-war letter to The New York Review of Books. His work appeared in Oregon Literary Review and The Nation. His fourth book, Sailing Too Far, was published by Harper & Row in 1973 and became widely noted. He also served three terms (1973-1975; 1978–1979; 1985) as director of Binghamton's creative writing program and became a full professor in 1974. Throughout his career, he held visiting professorships, fellowships and lectureships at various institutions, including Ben-Gurion University of the Negev (1971-1972), the University of Haifa (1973; 1981), the University of Hawaiʻi (1975), Keio University (1978) and Antwerp University (1985). In addition, he was a frequent Yaddo (1965-1976; 1990; 1992) and MacDowell (1966; 1979) artist-in-residence.

=== Illness ===
Around 1970, Kessler had a brief bout with thyroid cancer, an affliction he shared with poet Paul Blackburn. Boarding a bus after a visit to Binghamton, Blackburn told Kessler, "How warm to share a common disease." Blackburn died not long after.

After Kessler's death, Binghamton University established a poetry award in his honor, the Milton Kessler Memorial Prize for Poetry.

== Works ==
- "Zero". The Los Angeles Times. September 2, 1990.

=== Books ===
- Free Concert: New and Selected Poems. Etruscan Press. 2002. ISBN 978-0-9718228-4-9.
- Riding first car: learning the boxes. Black Bird Press. 1995. (Chapbook)
- The Grand Concourse. State University of New York at Binghamton. 1990. ISBN 978-0-938621-02-7.
- Sailing Too Far. Harper & Row. 1973. ISBN 978-0-06-012354-3.
- Woodlawn North. Illustrator Robert Ernst Marx. Impressions Workshop. 1970. ISBN 0-932052-68-1.
- Called home: a sequence of poems : 1964-66. The Black Bird Press. 1967. (Chapbook)
- A Road Came Once. Ohio State University Press. 1963.

=== Anthologies ===
- Heather McHugh; David Lehman, eds. (2007). "Comma of God". The Best American Poetry 2007. Simon and Schuster. ISBN 978-0-7432-9972-5.
- Liz Rosenberg, ed. (1996). The invisible ladder: an anthology of contemporary American poems for young readers. Macmillan. ISBN 978-0-8050-3836-1.
