= Nicky Beer =

American poet

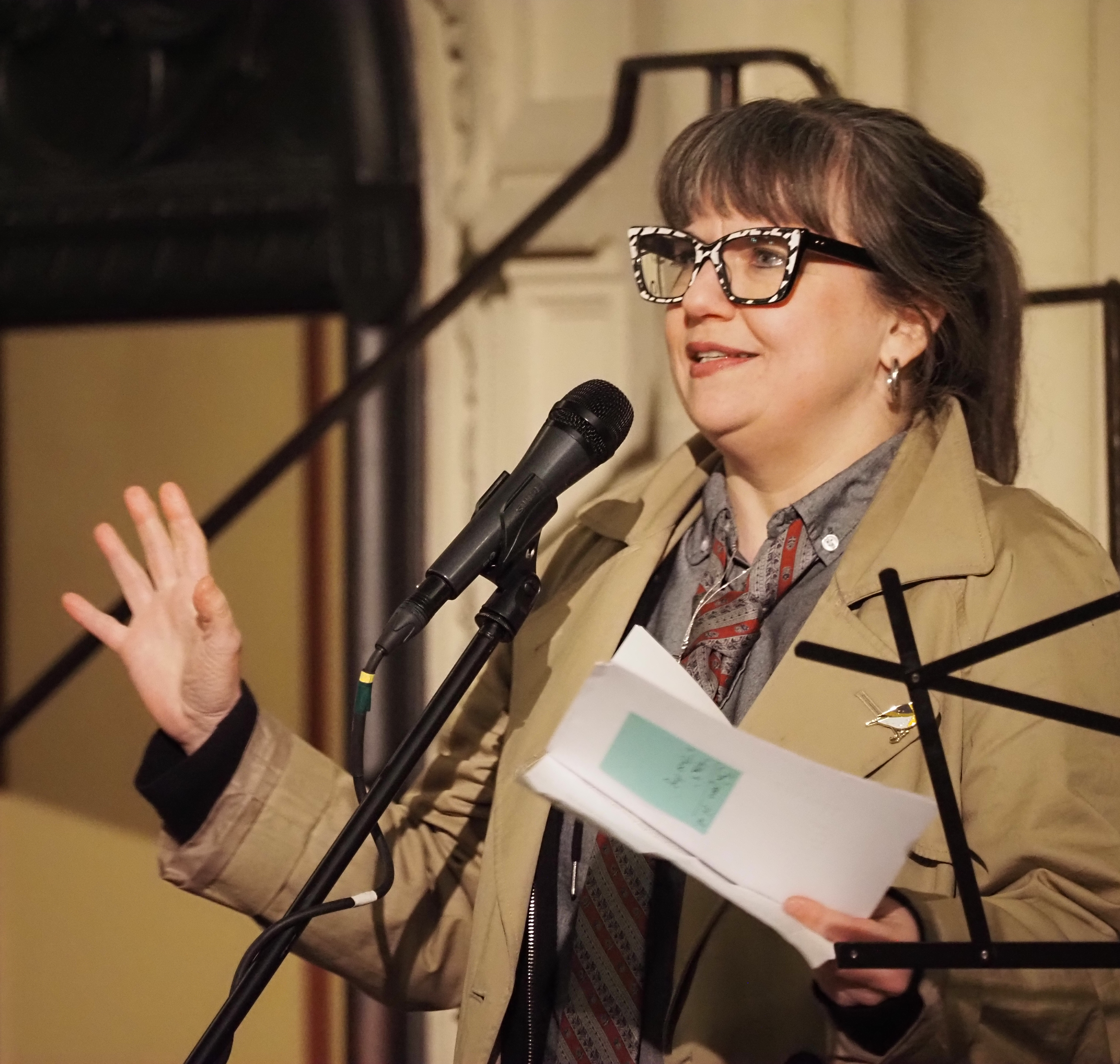
- Born: 1976 (age 49–50)
- Education: Yale University; University of Houston; University of Missouri
- Occupation: Poet
- Employer: University of Colorado Denver
- Notable work: Real Phonies and Genuine Fakes
- Awards: Guggenheim Fellowship (2023); Lambda Literary Award for Bisexual Poetry (2023)

Nicole C. Beer (born 1976) is an American poet. A 2017 MacDowell Fellow and 2023 Guggenheim Fellow, she is Associate Professor of English at University of Colorado Denver (CU Denver) Department of English. One of her poetry books, Real Phonies and Genuine Fakes, won the 2023 Lambda Literary Award for Bisexual Poetry.

== Biography ==
Nicole C. Beer was born in 1976 to William R. Beer, a sociologist who worked as a professor at Brooklyn College, and Rose (née Salisbury). She was raised in Northport, New York and went to Northport High School.

She later obtained her BA in Sociology (1998) from Yale University, MFA in Creative Writing and Literature (2003) from the University of Houston, and her PhD in English (2007) from the University of Missouri. After spending a year as a visiting poet at Murray State University (2008-2009), she moved to the University of Colorado Denver (CU Denver) Department of English as a senior instructor, before being promoted to assistant professor in 2011 and associate professor in 2016.

She was originally inspired to go into poetry after seeing the William Blake poem "The Tyger" on PBS, and she had been writing poems by the time she was in fourth grade. She became a 2007 National Endowment for the Arts Creative Writing Fellow in Poetry. In 2009, she joined CU Denver's literary journal Copper Nickel as their poetry co-editor, and after its founder Jake Adam York's death in 2012, she became one of his two literary executors in 2013. Her first two poetry books, The Diminishing House (2010) and The Octopus Game (2015), won the Colorado Book Award for Poetry. In 2023, she won the Lambda Literary Award for Bisexual Poetry for her next book Real Phonies and Genuine Fakes, which she had worked on during her 2017 stint at the MacDowell Colony. In 2023, she was appointed a Guggenheim Fellow in Poetry.

At CU Denver, she teaches classes in creative writing, poetry, and literary studies (particularly in intersection with women's studies and LGBT studies). She also works as a juror in poetry contests, including outside of Colorado and for the Academy of American Poets Prize and The Scholastic Art & Writing Awards.

Beer is bisexual and queer.

== Publications ==
=== Books ===
- The Diminishing House (2010)
- The Octopus Game (2015)
- Real Phonies and Genuine Fakes (2022)
