= Cody Walker (poet) =

American poet, essayist, and educator (born 1967)

- Born: January 28, 1967 (age 59); Baltimore, Maryland, U.S.
- Education: University of Wisconsin (BA); University of Arkansas (MFA); University of Washington (PhD)
- Occupations: Poet, essayist, educator
- Website: www.codywalker.net

James Cody Walker (born January 28, 1967) is an American poet, essayist, and educator.

== Family ==
His brother Clay Walker is the Mayor of Denali Borough, Alaska.

== Academic studies ==
Walker holds a Bachelor of Arts from the University of Wisconsin, a Master of Fine Arts from the University of Arkansas, and a Ph.D. from the University of Washington.

== Career ==
A longtime writer-in-residence in Seattle Arts & Lectures' Writers in the Schools program, he was elected Seattle Poet Populist in 2007. He has been described as "Seattle's prince of the poetic one-two punch". In 2009, he spent a term as the Amy Clampitt Resident Fellow in Lenox, Massachusetts.

His work appears in The Cortland Review, The Best American Poetry, Slate, Parnassus, Light, and The Yale Review. He currently teaches English at the University of Michigan, and writes regularly for The Kenyon Review.

== Awards ==
He is a co-recipient of the 2009 Amy Clampitt Residency Award and author of the poetry collection Shuffle and Breakdown. Walker received the James Boatwright III Prize for Poetry from Shenandoah in 2003 and a Distinguished Teaching Award from the University of Washington in 2005. In 2010, he won Cartoon Caption Contest #226 in The New Yorker.

== Works ==
- "Poetry"; "Warmer Still"; "Cinque Poesie", Courtland Review, February 2003, Issue 22
- "St. Louis / January 1891"; "Wheeling / February 1892", Courtland Review, November 2007, Issue 37
- "Petronius"; “The Mould of a Dog Corpse”, Mare Nostrum, Volume III
- Shuffle and Breakdown, was published in 2008 by The Waywiser Press.
