= Natasha Sajé =

American poet

Natasha Sajé (born June 6, 1955, in Munich, West Germany) is an American poet. Her memoir Terroir was a finalist for the Lambda Literary Award for Bisexual Literature.

== Life ==
She grew up in New York City, and New Jersey. She graduated from the University of Virginia, Johns Hopkins, and the University of Maryland, College Park.

She taught at Westminster College, where she is now Emeritus, and Vermont College.

Her work appeared in The New York Times, The Gettysburg Review, The Kenyon Review, New Republic, Parnassus, Ploughshares, Shenandoah, and The Writers Chronicle.

== Awards ==
- 2020 Pushcart Prize XLIV
- 2015 15 Bytes Award, Vivarium
- 2008 Alice Fay Di Castagnola Award
- 2004 Utah Poetry Book of the Year, Bend
- 1993 Agnes Lynch Starrett Poetry Prize, Red Under the Skin
- Towson State Prize in Literature

== Books ==
=== Poetry ===
- Red Under the Skin. Pittsburgh. 1994. ISBN 978-0-8229-3865-1., 2nd printing 1996
- Bend. Tupelo Press. 2004. ISBN 978-1-932195-03-3.
- The Art of the Novel. 2004.
- Vivarium. Tupelo Press. 2014. ISBN 978-1-936797-44-8.

=== Criticism ===
- Windows and Doors: A Poet Reads Literary Theory. University of Michigan Press. 2014. ISBN 978-0472035991.

=== Creative Nonfiction ===
- Terroir: Love, Out of Place. Trinity University Press. 2020. ISBN 9781595349323.

== Other works ==
- "Against Fireworks". America Magazine. July 17, 2020.
- "The Alfred Hitchcock Dream". Shenandoah. Spring 2020.
- "Slipskin". Rhino Magazine. Spring 2020.
- "Correspondence". The Maine Review. April 28, 2020.
- "Dear Jolene". Verse Daily. 2019.
- "Dear Jolene" (PDF). Copper Nickel. Fall 2019.
- "Alive". Poetry Magazine. March 2019.
- "on beauty". Plume Poetry. February 2019.
- "to the Phaestos disc". Plume Poetry. February 2019.
- Sajé, Natasha (April 17, 2009). "Down to 'The Wire'". The New York Times.
- "T". Gettysburg Review. Autumn 2005. Archived from the original on 2008-05-11.
- "The Tunnel". Virginia Quarterly Review: 700–701. Autumn 2003. Archived from the original on 2013-04-05.
- "The Statues". Ploughshares. Spring 2002. Archived from the original on February 10, 2007.
- "Graphology". Ploughshares. Spring 2002. Archived from the original on February 10, 2007.
- "The Philosopher's Name Was Misspelled Everywhere". Ploughshares. Spring 2002. Archived from the original on February 10, 2007.
- "Agoraphobia". Virginia Quarterly Review: 673–674. Autumn 1994. Archived from the original on 2013-04-04.
