= Barrow Street (magazine) =

American poetry magazine

- Cover of the Winter 2012/2013 issue
- Categories: literary magazine
- Frequency: annual
- Founded: 1998
- Company: Barrow Street Press
- Country: United States
- Based in: New York City
- Language: English
- Website: www.barrowstreet.org
- ISSN: 1522-2160

Barrow Street is an annual American poetry magazine founded in 1998 and based in New York City. The small journal publishes prominent poets and its poems have been reprinted in anthologies such as The Best American Poetry series.

Some of the poets whose work has appeared in the magazine include Kim Addonizio, Billy Collins, David Lehman, Richard Lehnert, Jeffrey Levine, Robert Wrigley and Rachel Zucker.

The editors also run Barrow Street Press, a small literary nonprofit press with annual book contests for both poetry and prose.

The most recent issue of Barrow Street was published in Winter 2022/2023.
