= Leslie Adrienne Miller =

American poet

Leslie Adrienne Miller (born 1956) is the author of six collections of poems.

Professor of English at the University of St. Thomas in St. Paul, Minnesota, Miller holds a B.A. from Stephens College, an M.A. from the University of Missouri, and an M.F.A. from the Iowa Writers' Workshop and a Ph.D. from the University of Houston.

Her poems have appeared in The Kenyon Review, North American Review, Antioch Review, Georgia Review, The American Poetry Review, Prairie Schooner and New England Review.

== Works ==
- Y: Poems (Graywolf Press, 2012)
- The Resurrection Trade (Graywolf Press, 2007)
- Eat Quite Everything You See (Graywolf Press, 2002)
- Yesterday Had a Man in it (Carnegie Mellon University Press, 1998)
- Ungodliness (Carnegie Mellon University Press, 1994)
- Staying Up For Love (Carnegie Mellon University Press, 1990)
