= Julie Carr =

American poet

Julie Carr (born 1966) is an American poet who was awarded a 2011 National Endowment for the Arts Fellowship for Poetry.

She graduated from Barnard College with a BA in 1988, from New York University with an MFA in 1997, and from University of California, Berkeley with a Ph.D. in 2006. She teaches at University of Colorado.

Her work has appeared in Volt, Verse, New American Writing, Parthenon West, Boston Review, Verse, Bombay Gin, Denver Quarterly, Colorado Review, American Letters and Commentary, and Public Space.

She is co-publisher of Counterpath Press.

== Awards ==
- 2009 National Poetry Series
- 2009 Ahsahta Press Sawtooth Poetry Prize
- 2011 National Endowment for the Arts Fellowship for Poetry.

== Works ==
- "house/boat", Boston Review, April/May 2002
- "from Voc Ed", Tarpaulin Sky Fall Winter 2005
- Mead: An Epithalamion. University of Georgia Press, 2004, ISBN 978-0-8203-2684-9
- Equivocal. Alice James Books, 2007, ISBN 978-1-882295-63-0
- Sarah—of Fragments and Lines. Coffee House Press, 2010, ISBN 978-1-56689-251-3
- 100 Notes on Violence. Ahsahta Press, 2010, ISBN 978-1-934103-11-1
- Contributed to The &NOW Awards 2: The Best Innovative Writing. &NOW Books, 2013.
- Someone Shot My Book. University of Michigan Press, 2018, ISBN 978-0-472-03720-9

=== Anthologies ===
- "marriage", The Best American Poetry 2007 Simon and Schuster, 2007, ISBN 978-0-7432-9973-2
- Not for Mothers Only: Contemporary Poems on Child-Getting and Child-Rearing, Fence Books, 2007, ISBN 978-0-9771064-8-6

== Reviews ==
In her first book, Mead: an Epithalamion (2004), Julie Carr employed marriage as both a theme and as the starting point for her poetic inquiries into relation and interconnection. Her second book, Equivocal (2007), goes a step farther in its scope, exploring specifically the roles and bonds of mother and child, and of child-becoming-mother, as well as opening into questions of family, history, and identity. In this investigation, Carr seeks to confront issues of an individual’s responsibility to others, whether they be a child, parent, spouse, or the world itself.
