= Amit Majmudar =

American novelist and poet

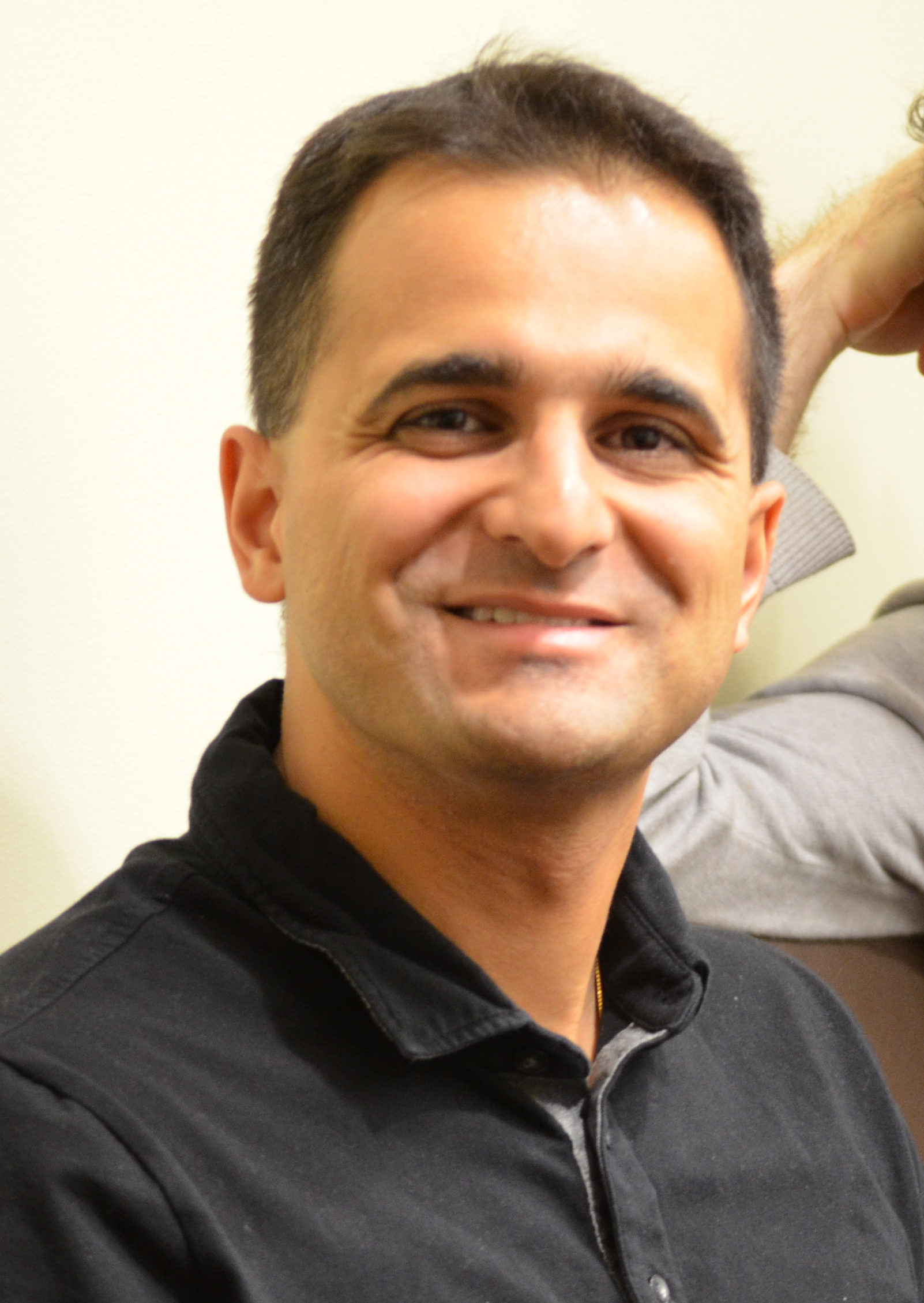
- Majmudar at the Neustadt Festival 2015
- Born: 1979 (age 46–47)
- Education: University of Akron (BS); Northeast Ohio Medical University (MD)
- Occupations: Novelist; poet
- Spouse: Ami
- Children: 3

Amit Majmudar (born 1979) is an American novelist and poet. In 2015, he was named the first Poet Laureate of Ohio.

== Life ==
Majmudar, a son of Gujarati Indian immigrants, grew up in the Cleveland area. He earned a BS at the University of Akron and an MD at Northeast Ohio Medical University. He is a diagnostic radiologist specializing in nuclear medicine practicing full-time in Columbus, Ohio, where he lives with his wife Ami and his twin sons, Shiv and Savya, and daughter Aishani.

His poems have appeared in The Antioch Review, Image, Poetry, National Poetry Review, Smartish Pace, River Styx, and The New Yorker.

== Bibliography ==
=== Novels ===
- Partitions, Metropolitan Books, 2011.
- The Abundance: A Novel. Metropolitan Books. 2013. ISBN 978-0-8050-9658-3.
- Sitayana, Penguin, 2019.

=== Poetry ===
Collections

- Entrance. Ohm Publishing. 1997. ISBN 978-0-9658704-9-8.
- 0°, 0°: Poems. Northwestern University Press. 2009. ISBN 978-0-8101-2625-1.
- Heaven and Earth. Story Line Press. 2011.
- Dothead, Knopf, 2016

Translations

- Godsong : a verse translation of the Bhagavad Gita

Anthologies

- Resistance, rebellion, life : 50 poems now / edited and introduced by Amit Majmudar
