= Landis Everson =

American poet (1926–2007)

Landis Everson (October 5, 1926 – November 17, 2007) was an American poet. In the late 1940s, he was a member of the Berkeley Renaissance along with his friends Robert Duncan, Jack Spicer, and Robin Blaser. Everson was the inaugural recipient of the Emily Dickinson Award from the Poetry Foundation.

== Overview ==
Everson was born and grew up in Coronado, California. He attended the University of Redlands in Southern California.

Everson, Spicer, and Blaser participated in a poetry group that met on Sundays up until 1960. Duncan was excluded from this group. Around this time James Herndon published Everson's pamphlet Postcard from Eden. His work also appeared in John Ashbery & Harry Mathews's Locus Solus in 1962.

Jack Spicer died in 1965; Robin Blaser moved to Vancouver; and Everson stopped writing poetry.

The Boston poet Ben Mazer came across Everson's work while putting together a special feature on the Berkeley Renaissance for Fulcrum. Mazer's interest encouraged Everson to start writing poetry again.

His collection, Everything Preserved: Poems 1955-2005 (ISBN 1555974538), edited by Mazer, was published in 2006. This volume collects the poems Everson wrote in his two periods of writing: between 1955 and 1960, and between 2003 and 2005. Toward the end of his life, Everson lived in San Luis Obispo, California.

== Death and legacy ==
The initial reports of Everson's death were shrouded in mystery. Marin County wire services reported that it was an apparent suicide using a World War Two standard-issue service revolver.
