= Brad Leithauser =

American writer

Brad E. Leithauser
- Born: February 27, 1953 (age 73); Detroit, Michigan, U.S.
- Education: Harvard University
- Occupations: Novelist; essayist; poet; teacher
- Years active: 1982–present
- Employer(s): Mount Holyoke College; Johns Hopkins University

Brad E. Leithauser (born February 27, 1953) is an American poet, novelist, essayist, and teacher. After serving as the Emily Dickinson Lecturer in the Humanities at Mount Holyoke College and visiting professor at the MFA Program for Poets & Writers at the University of Massachusetts Amherst, he is now on faculty at the Johns Hopkins Writing Seminars.

== Biography ==
Leithauser was born in 1953 in Detroit, Michigan. He is an alumnus of the Cranbrook School in Bloomfield Hills, Michigan and a graduate of Harvard College and Harvard Law School. He worked for three years as a research fellow at the Kyoto Comparative Law Center in Japan. Leithauser has lived in Japan, Italy, England, Iceland, and France. He was married to the poet Mary Jo Salter for many years (they divorced in December 2011) and previously taught at Mount Holyoke College. In January, 2007, Leithauser joined the faculty of Johns Hopkins University in Baltimore, Maryland.

Leithauser's work has appeared in The New York Times, The New York Review of Books, Time, The New Yorker, and The New Criterion.

He is on the editorial board of the literary magazine The Common, based at Amherst College.

Leithauser is the uncle and godfather of Hamilton Leithauser, lead singer of The Walkmen.

== Awards and grants ==
- Ingram Merrill Foundation Grant
- MacArthur Fellowship
- 1982 Guggenheim Fellowship
- 1984 Younger Poets Award from Academy of American Poets
- Medal of the Order of the Falcon (awarded by the President of Iceland)

== Bibliography ==
=== Poetry collections ===
- Hundreds of Fireflies Knopf, 1982, ISBN 978-0-394-74896-2
- Cats of the Temple, Knopf, 1986, ISBN 978-0-394-74152-9
- The Mail from Anywhere, Knopf, 1990, ISBN 978-0-394-58586-4
- The Odd Last Thing She Did, Alfred A. Knopf, 1998, ISBN 978-0-375-40141-1
- Lettered creatures: light verse. David R. Godine Publisher. 2004. ISBN 978-1-56792-275-2.
- Curves and Angles. Random House Digital, Inc. 2006. ISBN 978-0-307-26528-9.
- Toad to a Nightingale. David R. Godine Publisher. 2007. ISBN 978-1-56792-341-4.

=== Novels ===
- Equal Distance, Knopf, 1985; New American Library, 1986, ISBN 978-0-452-25818-1
- Hence, Knopf, 1989
- Seaward, Knopf, 1993
- The Friends of Freeland, A.A. Knopf, 1997, ISBN 978-0-679-45083-2
- A Few Corrections. Random House Digital, Inc. 2001. ISBN 978-0-375-72558-6.
- Darlington's Fall: A Novel in Verse, Alfred A. Knopf, 2002, ISBN 978-0-375-41148-9
- The Art Student's War, Random House Digital, Inc., 2009, ISBN 978-0-307-27111-2
- The Promise of Elsewhere, Alfred A. Knopf, 2019, ISBN 978-0-525-65503-9

=== Essay collections ===
- Penchants and Places, A.A. Knopf, 1995

=== Edited volumes ===
- The Norton Book of Ghost Stories (1994) ISBN 0-393-03564-6

=== Anthologies ===
- Katharine Washburn; John F. Thornton, eds. (1997). "The Saving Minutes". Dumbing down: essays on the strip mining of American culture. W. W. Norton & Company. ISBN 978-0-393-31723-7.
