= Paul Guest (poet) =

American poet and memoirist

- Born: Chattanooga, Tennessee, U.S.
- Education: University of Tennessee at Chattanooga; Southern Illinois University (MFA)
- Occupations: Poet; memoirist
- Writing career
- Notable awards: Whiting Award (2007)

Paul Guest is an American poet and memoirist.

== Early life and education ==
Paul Guest was born in Chattanooga, Tennessee. When he was twelve, Guest broke the third and fourth vertebrae in his neck in a bicycle accident, bruising his spinal cord and paralyzing him from the neck down. He is a quadriplegic.

He graduated from University of Tennessee at Chattanooga and from Southern Illinois University with an M.F.A. in 1999.

== Career ==
Guest's poems have appeared in Best American Poetry, Poetry, The Nation, The Georgia Review, American Poetry Review, Ploughshares, Harper's, The Paris Review, Tin House, The Kenyon Review, The Missouri Review, Slate and elsewhere. They are also published in collections as books.

== Honors and awards ==
- 2011 Guggenheim Fellowship in Poetry
- 2010 Barnes & Noble Discover Great New Writers series
- 2007 Whiting Award
- 2006 Prairie Schooner Book Prize in Poetry
- 2002 New Issues Press Poetry Prize

== Published works ==
=== Poetry collections ===
- I Hope For Everything. BOA Editions. (forthcoming in 2028)
- Because Everything Is Terrible. Diode Editions. 2018. ISBN 978-1939728234.
- My Index of Slightly Horrifying Knowledge. Ecco. 2008. ISBN 978-0-06-168516-3.
- Notes For My Body Double. University of Nebraska Press. 2007. ISBN 978-0-8032-6035-1.
- Exit Interview: Poems. New Michigan Press. 2006. ISBN 978-0-9762092-7-0.
- The Resurrection of the Body and the Ruin of the World. New Issues, Western Michigan University. 2003. ISBN 978-1-930974-27-2.

=== Memoir ===
- One More Theory About Happiness. Ecco. 2010. ISBN 9780061685170.
