= Harriet Zinnes =

American writer (1919–2019)

- Born: Victoria Harriet Fich; April 18, 1919; Hyde Park, Boston
- Died: November 30, 2019 (aged 100); New York City
- Education: Hunter College, Brooklyn College, New York University
- Occupations: Poet; fiction writer; professor; critic
- Spouse: Irving Zinnes (1916 – 1979)
- Writing career
- Language: English
- Notable works: Entropisms (Gallimaufry, 1978); Blood & Feathers (Schocken, 1988, Reprinted: Asphodel/Moyer Bell, 1993) Whither Nonstopping (2005); Light Light or the Curvature of the Earth (2009); Weather Is Whether (2012); Harriet Zinnes: New & Selected Poems (2014)

Harriet Zinnes (April 18, 1919 – November 30, 2019) was an American poet, fiction writer, translator, art critic, literary scholar and professor. She is associated with poets such as Karl Shapiro, Delmore Schwartz, and Allen Ginsberg, and the writer Anaïs Nin.

Growing up in the early 20th century, Zinnes's poetic and critical output, as with her peers', was concerned with the complex transition between aesthetic and social tensions associated with high modernism and postmodern literature and art. Her creative writing practice was informed by her extensive work on Ezra Pound, her translations of Jacques Prévert, her art criticism, her marriage to a physicist, and her interest in painting and conceptual art.

== Life and education ==
Zinnes was born Victoria Harriet Fich in Hyde Park, Massachusetts, to Assir N. Fich and Sara (Goldberg) Fich. Her father, a Russian immigrant from a long line of musicians, played a significant role in Zinnes's youth, as he was the one that moved the family from Massachusetts to New York City. He also talked about literature and philosophy with the young Harriet and the rest of the family. Zinnes recounts growing up in Massachusetts, and then in New York City. As told to Contemporary Authors, Harriet lived “in Norwood, a small town, until the depression and until my restless father (a practicing pharmacist but a former singer at the Metropolitan Opera and a law student) thought New York City would provide more financial and professional possibilities. He was wrong. ... Tranquility to me after this move was rare. My classmates scoffed at my accent and my shy town ways.”

Her early traumas and responsibilities, as well as her father's unhappiness, became a central theme in Zinnes's early poetic writing. She associates this unorthodox childhood with her writing practice: “I withdrew,” Zinnes told Contemporary Authors. “I had been writing since I was six years old – everyone always called me a poet: teasingly, affectionately, and perhaps in that American way, a bit scoffingly at one who seemed not to be able to cope with the practical. Things were still difficult when I reached college age. In Massachusetts I would have gone to Latin High, and then to Radcliffe, perhaps. Instead, living in New York, I went to Washington Irving High School (then a fine academic school), and found my way as a writer. I became editor of the school paper – and wrote poem after poem.”

She received her bachelor's degree at Hunter College (now Hunter College of the City University of New York) in 1939. While she studied at Hunter College, Zinnes became more involved in the New York art scene. At Hunter, she noticed a lack of intellectual rigor throughout the literature department. Because of this, she was drawn to the philosophy department: “I found philosophy more challenging than literature classes that were geared not even to the New Criticism. The professors were still teaching literature as if it were merely a manifestation of history.”

On September 24, 1943, Zinnes married Irving I. Zinnes, a physicist working on his PhD at NYU at the time, and later a professor of physics at Fordham University. The metaphysical currents of her writing, tied to different notions of science and philosophy, demonstrate the ways in which non-aesthetic resources came to inform her writing. Borrowing language and concepts from physics, she was able to create a broader, experimental relationship between disciplines.

Zinnes went on to complete her master's degree at Brooklyn College (now Brooklyn College of the City University of New York) in 1944, and her Ph.D., in 1953 at New York University. Her dissertation was on Alexander Pope's long poem Dunciad (1743), which became a major formal influence on Zinnes's own poetic output, even as a force to work against. As Eric Williamson puts it, “Whereas Pope's work is limited by the notion of form in the Neoclassical tradition, Zinnes's work is free of form and limited only by the imagination.”

Zinnes taught at a variety of schools including Rutgers University, University of Geneva, and Queens College of the City University of New York. It was at Queens College where she would spend most of her career, teaching there between 1949 and 1953, returning in 1962, and eventually attaining the rank of full professor. Except for a brief stint as visiting professor in Geneva from 1969 to 1971, she continued teaching at Queens until she retired in 1989, finishing her career as professor emerita.

Along with being a professor, Zinnes's career is also marked by her work as an editor. From 1942 to 1943 Zinnes worked as an editor of Raritan Arsenal Publications Division, and an associate editor at Harper's Bazaar Magazine from 1944 to 1946. Zinnes was also a contributing editor at Denver Quarterly and Hollins Critic.

== Literary career ==
Zinnes, who had done important work as a translator, professor, editor and art critic, was fundamentally a poet and fiction writer. She authored 11 books of poetry and 2 collections of short stories. Her writing, informed by many disparate traditions and styles, demonstrates the various currents and trends of the American literary tradition in the 20th century, from the “found poem” à la William Carlos Williams and Marcel Duchamp, to the ekphrastic verse, to the “proprioceptive” “composition by field” championed by Charles Olson in his essay “Projective Verse”, to the more cerebral poetics trends of the 1960s.

Zinnes said that her major early influences were Ezra Pound, T.S. Eliot, James Joyce, Gertrude Stein, and the French poets Stephane Mallarme, Charles-Pierre Baudelaire, and Paul-Toissaint-Jules Valery, which can be seen in two of her early publications (An Eye For An Eye and I Wanted to See Something Flying). Other influences include the erotic writing of Anaïs Nin, the stream-of-consciousness long poems of the Beat Generation, and the conceptual techniques of artists such as Robert Smithson and Marcel Duchamp, who brought non-aesthetic objects into the aesthetic sphere (see Entropisms).

As with her poetry, Zinnes's fiction is also more concerned with the literary experiment (see Lover, The Radiant Absurdity of Desire).

In 1988, Schocken Books published Blood and Feathers, Zinnes's translation of selected poems by mid-century French poet and screenwriter Jacques Prévert. The book received a second printing in 1993, when it was republished by Moyer Bell.

Zinnes was also a member of the International Association of Art Critics and a formidable art critic herself. She used her critical visual acumen to inform both her poetry and her work as a literary scholar. In a compendium on the poet Ezra Pound's relationship to the arts (see her edited collection of Pound's art writing, Ezra Pound and the Visual Arts), she writes that “Pound's art criticism … is … not just occasionally significant in itself but is also of special interest as the continuation by an American writer of a tradition [of poetry].”

In addition to her several books of poetry, Zinnes was published in numerous journals and periodicals, including AGNI, American Poetry Review, Denver Quarterly, The Manhattan Review, and NY Arts.

== Critical reception ==
Burt Kimmelman, in his article "The Dead and the Living: Hugh Seidman's Late Poems", wrote:

I’ve thought a lot about William Bronk's concise, dense, late statements. They don't possess the majestic sweep of his poems at middle age (in terms of line length, overall volume, the philosophical punch in the solar plexus). Bronk's late poems, however, hold their own, and they do seem typically Bronk. For me the comparison here is with someone like Harriet Zinnes; her late poems — their ethereal, sprightly, fleetingly brilliant statements seeming to have come from beyond the veil — are exciting in their exquisite lightness yet fascination that doesn't dissipate. Zinnes's last poems are supremely graceful, intelligent, paradoxically profound in their sheer defiance of gravity. Yet I'd not be surprised to find readers of her work, over the years, keeping to mind poems of hers written when she was at, say, full strength, which they know well, feeling the late poems to be a distinct leave-taking. They strike me as drawing upon the same wellspring of insight, finally, and as possessing an eerie gracefulness — less on display in her work of middle age, obfuscated there by something grander in presentation. That earlier work, not diminished by what would come, probably remains what her readers will embrace.

American Book Review noted: "Zinnes expects the reader to know modern art and much literature. She makes use of simple language ....Her wit demands a highly intellectual reader; memories do not degenerate into nostalgia but convert experience into sharply expressed realities the reader may share..."

== Selected works ==
=== Books ===
- An Eye for an I (Folder Editions, 1966)
- I Wanted to See Something Flying (Folder Editions, 1976)
- Entroprisms (Gallimaufry, 1978)
- Lover (Coffee House Press, 1988)
- Blood & Feathers (Schocken, 1988, Reprinted: Asphodel/Moyer Bell, 1993)
- My, Haven't the Flowers Been? (Magic Circle Press, 1995)
- The Radiant Absurdity of Desire (Avisson Press, 1998)
- Drawing on the Wall (Marsh Hawk Press, 2002)
- Whither Nonstopping (Marsh Hawk Press, 2005)
- Light Light or the Curvature of the Earth (Marsh Hawk Press, 2009)
- Weather Is Whether (Marsh Hawk Press, 2012)
- New & Selected Poems (Marsh Hawk Press, 2014)

=== Chapbooks ===
- Waiting and Other Poems (Goosetree Press, 1964)
- Book of Ten (Bellevue Press, 1981)
- Book of Twenty (Ancient Mariners Press, 1992)
- Plunge (Wild Honey Press, 2001)
- Listening to The Rain (Wild Honey Press, 2002)
- I Am Not a River (Moyer Bell, 2006)

=== Anthologies, translations, and criticism ===
- Ravishing Disunities (Wesleyan University Press, 2000)
- Blood & Feathers (Schocken, 1988. Reprinted: Asphodel / Moyer Bell, 1993)
- Ezra Pound and the Visual Arts (New Directions, 1980)
- Add I Shudder at Your Touch (Roc, 1991, reprinted 1992)
