= Forrest Hamer =

American poet (born 1956)

Forrest Hamer (born 1956) is an American poet, psychologist, and psychoanalyst. He is the author of three poetry collections, most recently Rift (Four Way Books, 2007). His first collection, Call & Response, (Alice James Books) won the Beatrice Hawley Award, and his second, Middle Ear (Roundhouse Press), received the Northern California Book Award. He has received fellowships from the Bread Loaf Writers’ Conference and the California Arts Council, and he has taught at the Callaloo Creative Writing Workshops.

His poetry has been anthologized in Poet’s Choice: Poems for Everyday Life, The Geography of Home: California’s Poetry of Place, The Ringing Ear: Black Poets Lean South, Blues Poems, Word of Mouth: An Anthology of Gay American Poetry, and three editions of The Best American Poetry; and has appeared in many magazines and literary journals including The American Poetry Review, Beloit Poetry Journal, Kenyon Review, Callaloo, Ploughshares, Shenandoah, TriQuarterly, and ZYZZYVA. He was educated at Yale University and the University of California - Berkeley. He lives in Oakland, California.

== Published works ==
- Rift. Four Way Books. 2007. ISBN 978-1-884800-75-7.
- Middle Ear. Roundhouse. 2000. ISBN 978-0-966669-16-9.
- Call and Response. Alice James Books. 1995. ISBN 978-1882295-06-7.

== Sources ==
- Four Way Books > Author Page > Forrest Hamer
- The Poetry Center at Smith College > Forrest Hamer Bio
- Alice James Books > Author Page > Forrest Hamer
