= Sharon Dolin =

American author, entrepreneur, and community activist

- Born: Brooklyn, New York
- Education: Cornell University, University of California at Berkeley

Sharon Dolin is an American poet, translator, and essayist, who is noted for her work in ekphrasis—writing in dialogue with art.

== Life ==
Born and raised in Brooklyn, New York, she lives in Manhattan, where she is Associate Editor of Barrow Street Press and directs Writing about Art in Barcelona. Dolin earned her B.A. degree from Cornell University in 1977, an M.A. from University of California at Berkeley in 1982, and a Ph.D. from Cornell University in 1990. Dolin received the Witter Bynner Fellowship from the Library of Congress and the AWP Donald Hall Prize for Poetry.

Dolin co-founded the Center for Book Arts Letterpress Poetry Chapbook Competition as well as the CBA Broadside Reading Series. She has taught at The Cooper Union, Hofstra University, The New School (where she was Writer-in-Residence at Eugene Lang College from 2006 to 2012), the Unterberg Poetry Center of the 92nd Street Y, and Poets House.

== Published works ==
- Dolin, Sharon (2020). Hitchcock Blonde: A Cinematic Memoir. Terra Nova Press. ISBN 9781949597080.
- Dolin, Sharon (2016). Manual for Living. University of Pittsburgh Press. ISBN 9780822964063.
- Dolin, Sharon (2012). Whirlwind. University of Pittsburgh Press. ISBN 9780822962212.
- Dolin, Sharon (2008). Burn and Dodge. University of Pittsburgh Press. ISBN 9780822960058.
- Dolin, Sharon (2004). Realm of the Possible. Four Way Books. ISBN 9781884800573.
- Dolin, Sharon (2003). Serious Pink. Marsh Hawk Press. ISBN 9780971333260.
- Dolin, Sharon (1995). Heart Work. The Sheep Meadow Press. ISBN 9781878818423.

== Translations ==
- Gorga, Gemma (2019). Book of Minutes. Oberlin College Press. ISBN 9780997335552.. Translated from the Catalan by Sharon Dolin.
