= Mike Dockins =

American poet

Mike Dockins (born 1972) is an American poet. He is the author of Slouching in the Path of a Comet, published in 2007 by Sage Hill Press. The book has been critically well received. His poem "Dead Critics Society" was selected for inclusion in 2007's Best American Poetry Anthology, edited by Heather McHugh, and also appeared on Verse Daily. His poems have appeared in Greensboro Review, Meridian, and Cimarron Review.
