= Albert Goldbarth =

American poet (born 1948)

- Born: January 31, 1948 (age 78); Chicago, Illinois, U.S.
- Education: University of Illinois (BA); University of Iowa (MFA)
- Occupations: Poet; Essayist; Professor
- Writing career
- Period: 1970s–present
- Genres: Poetry; Essays
- Notable awards: National Book Critics Circle Award (1991, 2001); Mark Twain Award for Humorous Poetry (2008); National Endowment for the Arts Fellowship; Guggenheim Fellowship

Albert Goldbarth (born January 31, 1948) is an American poet. He has won the National Book Critics Circle award for "Saving Lives" (2001) and "Heaven and Earth: A Cosmology" (1991), the only poet to receive the honor two times. He also won the Mark Twain Award for Humorous Poetry, awarded by the Poetry Foundation, in 2008. Goldbarth is a fellow of the National Endowment for the Arts and the John Simon Guggenheim Memorial Foundation.

The poetry of Albert Goldbarth is widely praised, and he has published extensively, with more than 30 collections to his credit, including poetry and essays. He is known for his prolific production, his gregarious tone, his eclectic interests - especially in science and scientists - and his distinctive "talky" style. In his review of Kitchen Sink, David Baker of The Kenyon Review says: "Albert Goldbarth is ... a contemporary genius with the language itself ... There is simply no contemporary poet like him." Goldbarth was awarded The Chad Walsh Poetry Prize by the Beloit Poetry Journal in 1994.

Goldbarth received his BA from the University of Illinois in 1969 and his MFA from the University of Iowa in 1971. Goldbarth taught at Cornell University and from 1977 to 1987 at the University of Texas at Austin. From 1987 to 2018, he served as the Adelle V. Davis Distinguished Professor of Humanities at Wichita State University, which houses the Goldbarth Archive in Ablah Library.

== Works ==
- Coprolites (1973, poetry)
- Jan 31 (1974, poetry)
- Opticks (1974, poetry)
- Keeping (1975, poetry)
- Comings Back (1976, poetry)
- Curve, Overlapping Narratives (1977, poetry)
- Different Fleshes, a Novel/Poem (1979, poetry)
- Ink, Blood, Semen (1980, poetry)
- The Smuggler's Handbook (1980, poetry)
- Faith (1981, poetry)
- Eurekas (1981, poetry)
- Goldbarth's Book of Occult Phenomena (1982, poetry)
- Who Gathered and Whispered Behind Me (1981, poetry)
- Original Light (1983, poetry)
- Arts & Sciences (1986, poetry)
- Sympathy of Souls (1990, essays)
- Delft (1990, essay-poem)
- Popular Culture (1990, poetry)
- Heaven and Earth, A Cosmology (1991, poetry)
- The Gods (1993, poetry)
- Across the Layers (1993, poetry)
- Marriage, and Other Science Fiction (1994, poetry)
- Great Topics of the World, Essays (1994, essays)
- Adventures in Ancient Egypt (1996, poetry)
- A Lineage of Ragpickers, Songpluckers, Elegiasts & Jewelers (Time Being Books, 1996)
- Beyond (1998, poetry)
- Dark Waves and Light Matter (1999, essays)
- Many Circles (2001, essays)
- Saving Lives (2001, poetry)
- Combinations of the Universe (2002, poetry)
- Pieces of Payne (2003, novel)
- Budget Travel through Space and Time (Graywolf Press, 2005, poetry)
- Griffin (2007, essays)
- The Kitchen Sink: New and Selected Poems 1972-2007 (Graywolf Press, 2007, poetry)
- To Be Read in 500 Years: Poems (Graywolf Press, 2009, poetry)
- The End of Space (2012, essays)
- Everyday People (2012, poetry)
- Keats's Phrase (2012, poetry)
- Selfish (Graywolf Press, 2015, poetry)
- The Adventures of Form and Content: Essays (Graywolf Press, 2017, essays)
- The Loves and Wars of Relative Scale (Lost Horse Press, 2017, poetry)
- The Now (University of Pittsburgh Press, 2019, poetry)
- Between Sleeping and Waking (Lost Horse Press, 2020, poetry)
- Other Worlds (University of Pittsburgh Press, 2021, poetry)
- Everybody (Lynx House Press, 2022, poetry)
- History (and Pre-) (Lynx House Press, 2024, poetry)
- Ludd Light (Loose Dog Press, 2025, poetry)
- The Wonder-World (BOA Editions, forthcoming 2027, poetry)

== See also ==
- Poetry
