= David Shumate =

American poet

- Occupation: Poet
- Writing career
- Notable awards: Agnes Lynch Starrett Poetry Prize (2003)

David Shumate is an American poet.

== Life ==
Shumate is the author of three books of prose poems published by the University of Pittsburgh Press: Kimonos in the Closet (2013), The Floating Bridge (2008) and High Water Mark (2004), winner of the 2003 Agnes Lynch Starrett Poetry Prize.

Shumate's poetry has been anthologized in Good Poems for Hard Times, The Best American Poetry, and The Writer’s Almanac. He was awarded an NEA Fellowship in poetry in 2009, and a Creative Renewal Fellowship by the Arts Council of Indianapolis in 2007.

Shumate has taught at Marian University. He lives in Zionsville, Indiana.

== Awards ==
- 2003 Agnes Lynch Starrett Poetry Prize
- 2005 Best Books of Indiana competition
- 2007 Creative Renewal Fellowship-Arts Council of Indianapolis
- 2009 NEA Creative Writing Fellowship

== Works ==
- "Plum", AGNI
- "In the Next America", Double Room
- "Afternoon Nap", Arabesques Review
- High Water Mark. University of Pittsburgh Press. 2004. ISBN 978-0-8229-5858-1.
- The Floating Bridge: prose poems. University of Pittsburgh Press. 2008. ISBN 978-0-8229-5989-2.
- Kimonos in the Closet, University of Pittsburgh Press, 2013

=== Anthologies ===
- Heather McHugh; David Lehman, eds. (2007). "Drawing Jesus". The Best American Poetry 2007. Simon and Schuster. ISBN 978-0-7432-9973-2.
- Ed Ochester, ed. (2007). American poetry now: Pitt poetry series anthology. University of Pittsburgh Press. ISBN 978-0-8229-4310-5.
