= Gregory O'Donoghue =

Irish poet

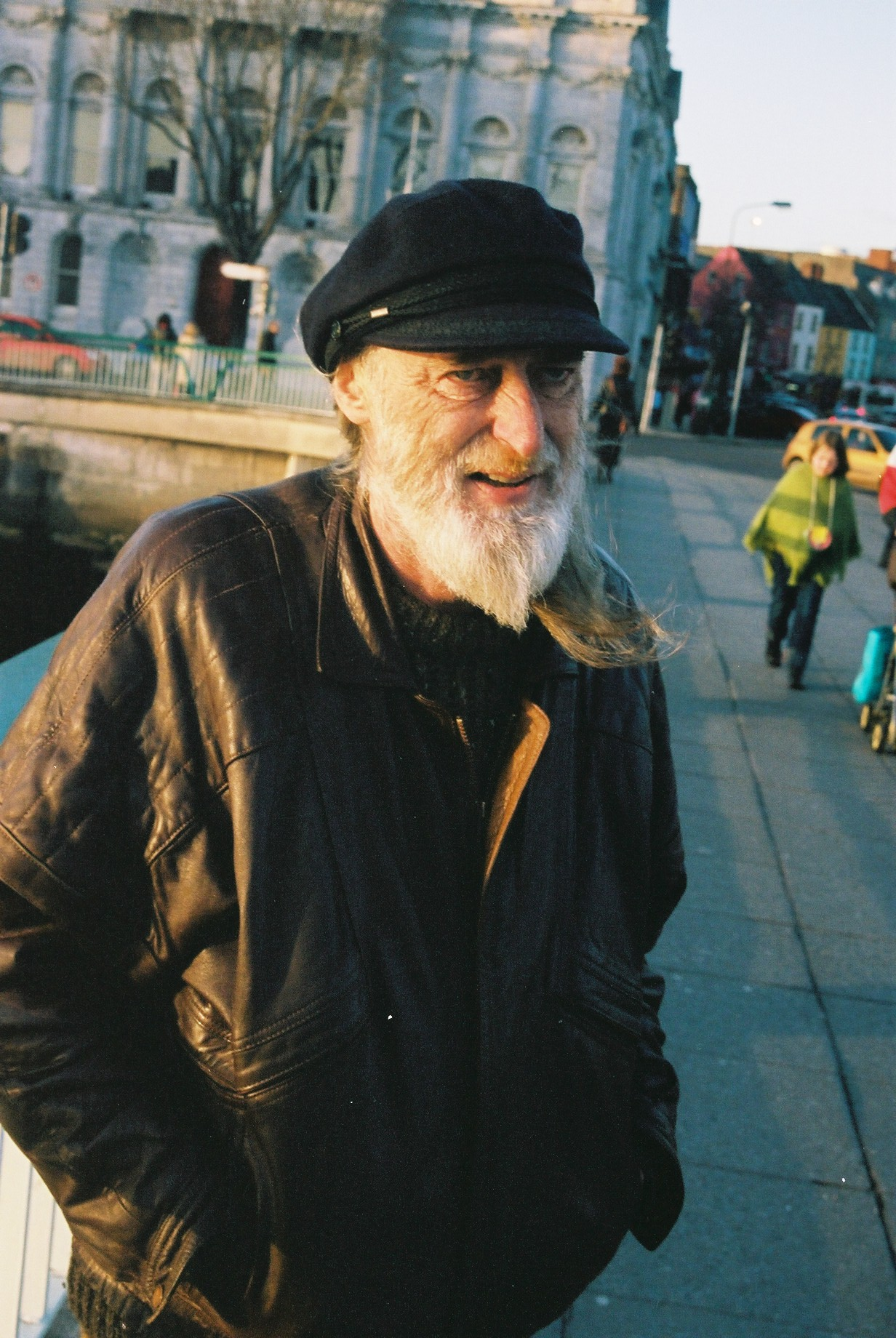
Gregory O'Donoghue in 2004

Gregory O'Donoghue (1951–2005) was an Irish poet.

Gregory O'Donoghue was born in Cork in 1951, son of the poet and playwright Robert O’Donoghue. He studied English literature at University College Cork under Sean Lucy and John Montague and was part of what Thomas Dillon Redshaw has described as "that remarkable generation" which also included Theo Dorgan, Maurice Riordan, Gerry Murphy, Thomas McCarthy, Greg Delanty and Seán Dunne. After completing an MA he studied for a doctorate at Queen's College Ontario, Canada, where he later taught.

O’Donoghue published his first book Kicking (1975) with the Gallery Press when he was 24 and became the youngest poet to be included in the Faber Book of Irish Verse. In 1980 he crossed the Atlantic to settle in Lincolnshire in the United Kingdom where he worked freight trains between South Derbyshire and King's Cross, Nottingham and Skegness. His book Making Tracks (Dedalus 2001) was largely influenced by this experience.

In the early 1990s O'Donoghue returned to Cork. He published an interim collection The Permanent Way in 1996 with the local Three Spires Press and subsequently became workshop leader at the Munster Literature Centre and poetry editor of the journal Southword. In 2004 he was the recipient of an artist's bursary from Cork City Council. In 2005 he published A Visit to the Clockmaker, translations of a selection of work by the Bulgarian poet Kristin Dimitrova. Seven months later he died unexpectedly. His final collection Ghost Dance (Dedalus) was published posthumously in 2006.

O'Donoghue is often seen as a poet of the Irish emigration experience. In New Hibernia Review Spring 2000, Thomas Dillon Redshaw wrote:

Gregory O'Donoghue ... made an early start with Kicking in 1975, published after he became a wandering scholar and had emigrated to Canada. O'Donoghue recently returned to Cork after spending a decade in Lincolnshire working for the British rail system. And that distinctive émigré experience—one shared by many Irish since the days of Carlyle—lies at the heart of O'Donoghue's finely crafted sequence "Roads." Our readers will find in O'Donoghue's lines not simply craft, but an intelligence that peers gracefully around the edges of "Paddy-works" themes and labour clichés.

== Poetry ==
- Kicking, The Gallery Press, Dublin 1975
- The Permanent Way, Three Spires Press, Cork 1996
- Making Tracks, Dedalus, Dublin 2001
- Ghost Dance, Dedalus, Dublin 2006

== Translations ==
- A Visit to the Clockmaker by Kristin Dimotrova (in collaboration with Dimitrova) Southword Editions, Cork 2005
- The Belling by Lazlo Lator (in collaboration with divers hands) Southword Editions, Cork 2005

== Gregory O'Donoghue Prize ==
The Munster Literature Centre established a prize in his memory, the Gregory O'Donoghue International Poetry Prize, which has been awarded annually since 2010.
