= Seán Lucy =

Irish poet and educator

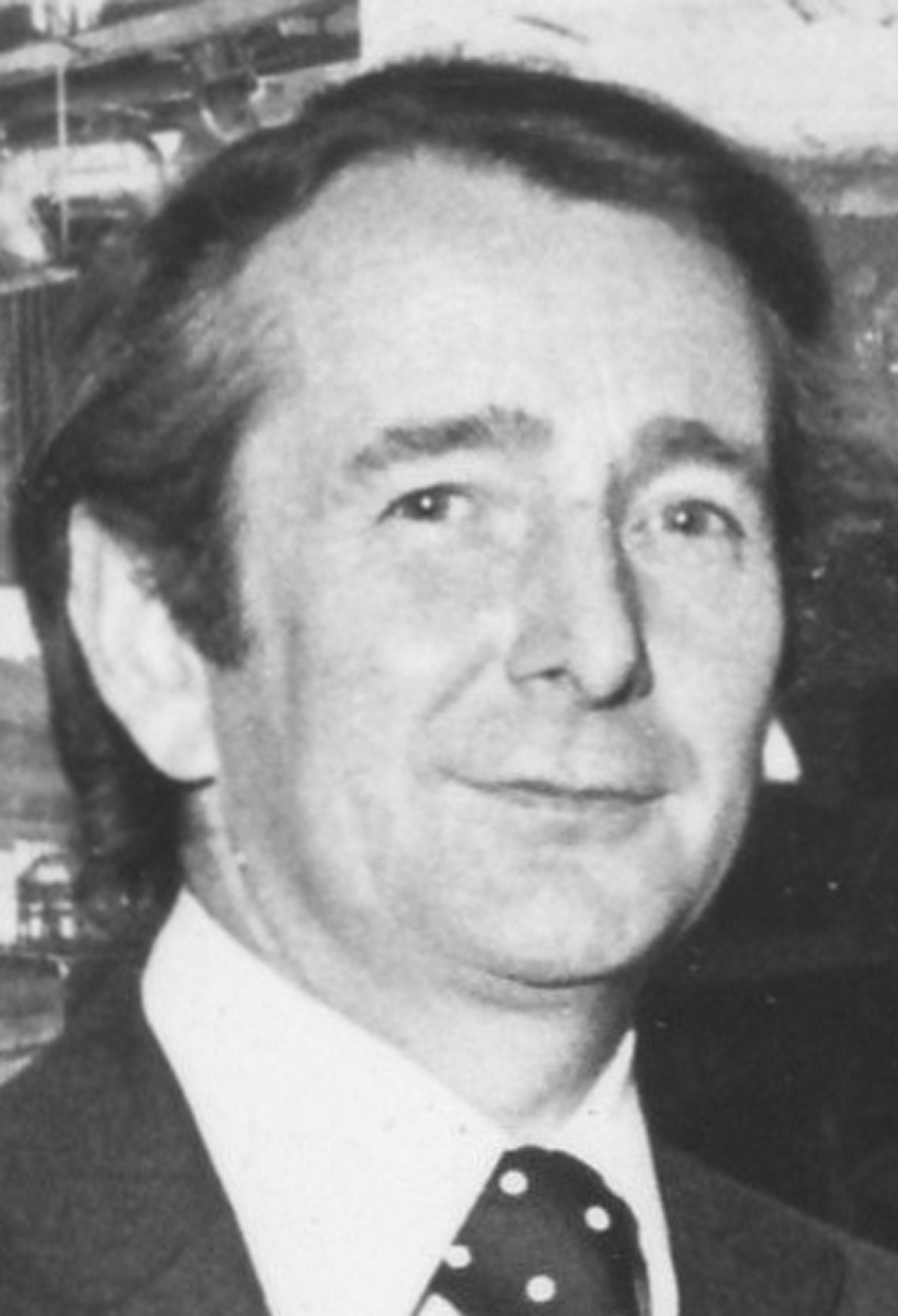
- Seán Lucy, c. 1975
- Born: March 12, 1931; Bombay, British India
- Died: July 25, 2001 (aged 70)
- Education: University College Cork (BA, MA)
- Occupations: Poet, critic, educator
- Writing career
- Language: English

Seán Lucy (12 March 1931 – 25 July 2001) was an Irish poet and educator.

== Biography ==
Lucy was born in Bombay, British India in 1931. His father was an Irish officer in the British army, who resigned his commission in 1935 to resettle the family in Ireland. Lucy was enrolled at Glenstal Abbey School, and later attended University College Cork, where he earned his bachelor's and master's degrees.

In 1954, he moved to England, where he served two years as an education officer in the British army. He subsequently taught for four years at Prior Park College in Bath as a Senior English Master. During this time, he married Patricia Kennedy, his first wife, with whom he had five children.

Lucy returned to Ireland in 1960 and joined the English faculty at University College Cork (UCC) in 1962, where he eventually became professor and department chair. The composer Sean O Riada, who lectured in music at the university from 1963 to 1971, was a friend. During this time, he published his first major critical work, TS Eliot and The Idea of Tradition (1960). He continued to write and edit critical works in English and Irish including Love Poems of the Irish (1967), as well as his own creative works in poetry. A collection, Unfinished Sequence and Other Poems was published in 1979. Also in 1979, he co-founded the University College Cork, Summer School for American students. During the 1980–81 academic year, he served as visiting professor in the English department at Loyola University Chicago.

Following his early retirement from UCC in 1986, Lucy moved to Chicago and married his second wife, fellow poet, Susan Leah Lederman. During these years, he taught Irish Literature at Loyola University, the Newberry Library and the Irish American Heritage Center. He died of a heart attack in 2001 following a traffic accident.

Lucy was involved in bringing the poet John Montague to the English Department at UCC, and the poets and writers Greg Delanty, William Wall, Theo Dorgan, Sean Dunne, Maurice Riordan, Gerry Murphy and Thomas McCarthy were students of Montague and Lucy at UCC in the 1970s.
