= Matthew Sweeney =

Irish poet (1952–2018)

- Born: 6 October 1952; Lifford, County Donegal, Ireland
- Died: 5 August 2018 (aged 65); Cork University Hospital, Ireland
- Resting place: Clonmany New Cemetery, County Donegal
- Education: University College Dublin; Polytechnic of North London; University of Freiburg (BA)
- Occupation: Poet
- Spouse: Rosemary Barber
- Partner: Mary Noonan
- Children: Nico (daughter); Malvin (son)
- Writing career
- Genre: Poetry
- Notable work: Horse Music
- Movements: "Alternative Realism" "Imagistic Narrative"

Matthew Gerard Sweeney (6 October 1952 – 5 August 2018) was an Irish poet. His work has been translated into Dutch, Italian, Hebrew, Japanese, Latvian, Mexican Spanish, Romanian, Slovak and German.

According to the poet Gerard Smyth: "I always sensed that in the first instance [Sweeney] regarded himself as a European rather than an Irish poet – and rightly so: like the German Georg Trakl whom he admired he apprehended the world in a way that challenged our perceptions and commanded our attention." Sweeney's work has been considered "barely touched by the mainstream of English writing" and more so by the German writers Kleist, Büchner, Kafka, Grass and Böll, as well as the aforementioned Trakl. According to Poetry International Web, Sweeney would be among the top five most famous Irish poets on the international scene.

== Biography ==
Sweeney was born in Lifford, County Donegal, in 1952. Growing up in Clonmany, he attended Gormanston College (1965–70). He then read sciences at University College Dublin (1970–72). He went on to study German and English at the Polytechnic of North London, spending a year at the University of Freiburg, before graduating with a BA Honours degree in 1978.

He met Rosemary Barber in 1972. They married in 1979 and had two children – Nico and Malvin – before the couple went their separate ways in the early 21st century. Having lived in London for many years until 2001, Sweeney separated from Rosemary and went to live in Timișoara (Romania) and Berlin (Germany). In 2007, he met his partner, Mary Noonan, and in early 2008 he moved to Cork to live with her there.

Sweeney died in Cork from motor neuron disease on 5 August 2018.

== Work ==
Sweeney produced numerous collections of poetry for which he won several awards. His novels for children include The Snow Vulture (1992) and Fox (2002). He authored a satirical thriller, co-written with John Hartley Williams, and entitled Death Comes for the Poets (2012).

Bill Swainson, Sweeney's editor at Allison and Busby in the 1980s, recalls: "As well as writing his own poetry, Matthew was a great encourager of poetry in others. The workshops he animated, and later the residencies he undertook, were famous for their geniality and seriousness and fun. Sometime in the late 1980s I attended one of these workshops in an upstairs room of a pub in Lamb's Conduit Street, Bloomsbury, where the poems were circulated anonymously and carefully read and commented on by all. Around the pushed-together tables were Ruth Padel, Eva Salzman, Don Paterson, Maurice Riordan, Jo Shapcott, Lavinia Greenlaw, Michael Donaghy, Maura Dooley and Tim Dooley." Sweeney later had residencies at the University of East Anglia and London's Southbank Centre, among many others. He read at three Rotterdam Poetry Festivals, in 1998, 2003 and 2009.

His final year saw the publication of two new collections: My Life As A Painter (Bloodaxe Books) and King of a Rainy Country (Arc Publications), inspired by Baudelaire's posthumously published Petits poèmes en prose. Having been diagnosed with motor neuron disease the previous year (a fate that had earlier befallen a sister of his), Sweeney died aged 65 at Cork University Hospital on 5 August 2018, surrounded by family and friends. He had continued writing up until three days before he died. In an interview shortly before his death, he was quizzed on his legacy, to which he gave the response: "Mostly what awaits the poet is posthumous oblivion. Maybe there will be a young man in Hamburg, or Munich, or possibly Vienna, for whom my German translations will be for a while important – and might just contribute to him becoming a German language poet with Irish leanings." Among those attending a special ceremony on 8 August 2018 at the Triskel Arts Centre in Cork city to celebrate Sweeney's life were fellow poets Jo Shapcott, Thomas McCarthy, Gerry Murphy, Maurice Riordan and Padraig Rooney. On 9 August 2018, Sweeney was buried in Clonmany New Cemetery in County Donegal.

== Awards ==
- 1984: New Statesman Prudence Farmer Award
- 1987: Cholmondeley Award
- 1999: Arts Council Writers' Award
- 2001: Arts Council of Ireland Writers' bursary
- 2007: T. S. Eliot Prize (shortlist)
- 2008: Poetry Now Award (shortlist) for his collection Black Moon
- 2011: The Steven Kings Award
- 2012: Maria Elsa Authors and Poets Award
- 2014: Piggot Poetry Prize (for Horse Music)
- Elected a member of Aosdána

== Works ==
Poetry

- A Dream of Maps. Dublin: Raven Arts Press. 1981. ISBN 978-0-906897-17-1.
- A Round House. London: Allison & Busby/Dublin: Raven Arts Press. 1983. ISBN 978-0-906897-66-9.
- The Lame Waltzer. London: Allison & Busby/Dublin: Raven Arts Press. 1985. ISBN 978-0-85031-644-5.
- Blue Shoes. London: Secker & Warburg. 1989. ISBN 978-0-436-50844-8.
- Cacti. Secker & Warburg. 1992. ISBN 978-0-436-50842-4.
- The Bridal Suite. London: Jonathan Cape. 1997. ISBN 978-9984-510-75-0.
- A Smell of Fish. Jonathan Cape. 2000. ISBN 978-0-224-06067-7.
- Up on the Roof: New and Selected Poems. Illustrator David Austen. Faber & Faber. 2001. ISBN 978-0-571-20728-2.
- Selected Poems. Jonathan Cape. 2002. ISBN 978-0-224-06212-1. (Canadian edition, A Picnic on Ice, Signal Editions, Véhicule Press, 2002)
- Sanctuary. Jonathan Cape. 2004. ISBN 978-0-224-07345-5.
- Black Moon. Jonathan Cape. 2007. ISBN 978-0-224-08092-7.
- The Night Post. Salt Publishing. 2010. ISBN 978-1-84471-484-1.
- Horse Music. Bloodaxe Books. 2013. ISBN 978-1-85224-967-0.
- Inquisition Lane. Bloodaxe Books. 2015. ISBN 978-1-78037-148-1.
- My Life as a Painter. Bloodaxe Books. 2018. ISBN 978-1-78037-414-7.
- King of a Rainy Country, Arc Publications, September 2018
- Contributor to A New Divan: A Lyrical Dialogue Between East and West, Gingko Library, 2019. ISBN 978-1-909942-28-8

Editor

- (with Jo Shapcott) Emergency Kit: Poems for Strange Times. Faber & Faber. 1996. ISBN 978-0-571-17207-8.
- (with Ken Smith and Felix Post) Beyond Bedlam: Poems Written out of Mental Distress. Anvil Press Poetry. 1997. ISBN 978-0-85646-296-2.
- The New Faber Book of Children's Verse. Faber & Faber. 2001. ISBN 978-0-571-21905-6.
- Irish Poems. Macmillan. 2005. ISBN 978-0-333-98748-3.

Novel

- Death Comes For The Poets. MUS. 2012. ISBN 978-0-9572136-0-9. Satirical crime novel, co-written with John Hartley Williams

Criticism

- Writing Poetry. Teach Yourself series. McGraw-Hill. 2008. ISBN 978-0-07-160250-1. With John Hartley Williams

== See also ==
- List of University of Freiburg people
