= Seán Dunne (poet) =

Irish poet (1956–1995)

Seán Dunne (1956–1995) was a poet born in Waterford, Ireland.

== Career ==
Dunne edited several anthologies, beginning with The Poets of Munster (1985) and finishing with the Ireland Anthology which was completed posthumously by George O'Brien and Dunne's partner Trish Edelstein. He released 3 collections of poems. Dunne's collections of poems were all well received, and in order of release are: Against the Storm (1985), The Sheltered Nest (1992) and Time and the Island. The account of his childhood In My Father's House, published in 1991, was a bestseller.

== Life ==
Dunne's father was Richard Dunne. His mother died in 1960 when Dunne was four. Seán attended Scoil Lorcain primary school in St Johns Park and Mount Sion secondary school in Waterford city, where he wrote for the school magazine and participated in organising poetry and music evenings. He attended University College Cork (UCC) where he was taught by Sean Lucy and John Montague and was part of a stream of talent issuing from the university in that period, which included Maurice Riordan, Gregory O'Donoghue, Theo Dorgan, Thomas McCarthy, William Wall, Gerry Murphy, Greg Delanty and others. He became part of a group referred to as "the Cork poets", despite not being from Cork himself. He was active in student politics, as detailed in his memoir The Road to Silence.

After college Dunne settled in Cork where he worked in the city library and continued to write and publish poems. Around this time he began to make a living from freelance journalism. He joined the Cork Examiner daily newspaper as a columnist.

Dunne died on 3 August 1995 of a heart problem, aged 39.

He had three children. His son, Gavin Dunne, is a successful independent musician based in Cork.

== Sean Dunne Writers Festival ==
In 1996 Waterford City Council inaugurated the Seán Dunne Writers Weekend in his honour. In 2002, under the auspices of the Waterford City Arts Office it became a festival, at which the Seán Dunne Young Writers Awards were issued. The festival featured writers and poets such as John McGahern, playwright and author Danny Morrison, Tom Paulin, Conor O'Callaghan and MacDara Woods, with performance poets Eamon Carr and Raven. It also featured others from contemporary Irish Literature, as well as former Taoiseach Garret FitzGerald and Scottish writer A. L. Kennedy.

In 2012, Waterford Library took charge of the festival and, soon after, it was realigned and rebranded as The Waterford Writers Weekend. Today Seán's legacy lives on with his books available from The Gallery Press. There are also readings of his work at the annual Waterford Poetry Day and a poetry competition in his honour for primary school children.
