= Dedalus Press =

Irish poetry publisher

Dedalus Press is one of the major publishers of contemporary poetry in Ireland (with more than 150 titles currently in print).

== History ==
Founded in 1985 by poet and fiction writer John F. Deane, since January 2005 it has been run by poet and editor Pat Boran and manager Raffaela Tranchino. At present the press publishes approximately 8 new book-length publications each year, concentrating on contemporary poetry from Ireland but also regularly issuing anthologies and individual volumes by international writers in translation (often in bilingual formats). It also occasional publishes bilingual (Irish/English) volumes of the work of Irish language writers, which to date includes book by Doireann Ní Ghríofa, Paddy Bushe and Ceaití Ní Bheildiúin. Among the many Irish or Ireland-based poets published by the press are Paula Meehan, Mark Roper, Gerry Murphy, Theo Dorgan, Enda Wyley, Patrick Deeley, Gerard Smyth, Macdara Woods, Mary Noonan and Grace Wells.

Significant anthologies published by Dedalus include Wingspan: A Dedalus Sampler (2006, ed. Pat Boran); Flowing, Still: Irish Poets on Irish Poetry (2009), a prose update to the Poetry Ireland anthology Watching the River Flow (Duffy & Dorgan, eds.); The Bee-Loud Glade (2009, ed. Pat Boran), which included an audio CD of poems set to music by Roger Gregg’s Crazy Dog Audio Theatre; Shine On (ed. Pat Boran) featuring some 50 Irish poets and fiction writers in support of those affected by mental ill-health (2011); Airborne: Poetry from Ireland (2012, ed. Pat Boran) on Apple’s iBooks platform; the bestselling If Ever You Go: A Map of Dublin in Poetry and Song (2014, eds. Pat Boran and Gerard Smyth), selected as the Dublin One City, One Book title for that year; the poetry and prose anthology The Deep Heart’s Core: Irish Poets Revisit A Touchstone Poem (2017, eds. Pat Boran and Eugene O'Connell); Writing Home: The ‘New Irish’ Poets (2019, eds. Pat Boran and Chiamaka Enyi-Amadi); The Word Ark: A Pocket Book of Animal Poems, illustrated by Gaetano Tranchino (2020, ed. Pat Boran); and Local Wonders: Poems of Our Immediate Surrounds (2021, ed. Pat Boran).

As well as Dedalus Press titles, Dedalus represents Thomas Kinsella's Peppercanister series of pamphlets, Iggy McGovern's occasional publications from Quaternion Press and titles from Pat Boran's independent imprint, Orange Crate Books.

According to MEAS report providing statistics for Irish poetry publications, Dedalus Press in 2018 was the joint-fourth most prolific poetry press on the Island of Ireland.

== Notable poets published by the press ==
- Paula Meehan
- Macdara Woods
- Theo Dorgan
- Doireann Ní Ghríofa
- Gerry Murphy
- Eva Bourke
- Ciaran O'Driscoll
