= Greg Delanty =

Irish poet (born 1958)

Greg Delanty (born 1958) is an Irish poet. An issue of the British magazine, Agenda, was dedicated to him.

== Early life and education ==
Delanty was born in Cork City, Ireland, and is generally placed in the Irish tradition, though he is also considered a Vermont and US poet appearing in various US anthologies. He lives for most of the year in America, where he is the poet in residence at Saint Michael's College, Vermont. He became an American citizen in 1994, retaining his Irish citizenship. He is a past president of the Association of Literary Scholars, Critics, and Writers.

Irish novelist Colum McCann, who has himself resettled in America, described Delanty as the "poet laureate of the contemporary Irish-in-America". McCann said: "Delanty has catalogued an entire generation and its relationship to exile. He is the laureate of those who have gone".

Greg Delanty attended University College Cork (UCC) where he was taught by Sean Lucy and John Montague, and was among a group of notable writers who emerged at the university in that period, including Maurice Riordan, Gregory O'Donoghue, Thomas McCarthy, William Wall, Gerry Murphy, and Seán Dunne. Equally important to him, were the poets who wrote in Irish, in UCC, such as Liam Ó Muirthile, Nuala Ní Dhomhnaill, Louis DePaor and Colm Breathnach.

== Writing career ==
At UCC Delanty edited the university magazine Quarryman and published his first poems in The Cork Examiner. As an editor of two issues of Quarryman he published poems by poets writing in Irish (without translation) and English, and was the first to do so in Ireland. He also solicited poems from fellow students and poets throughout Ireland and beyond, such as Seamus Heaney, Paul Durcan, Edwin Morgan and David Gascoyne.

The entry in The Oxford Companion to Modern Poetry (second edition) on Delanty states that:

In 1983, Delanty received the distinguished Patrick Kavanagh Poetry Award (given to an Irish poet who has not previously published a book), and in 1986 his first full-length work, Cast in the Fire (Dolmen Press) appeared. That same year he received the Allan Dowling Poetry Fellowship, judged by Christopher Ricks, the award of $20,000 stipulated that he had to travel to the United States for a brief period.
Since 1987, Delanty has been associated with Saint Michael College, Vermont, initially as a teacher and currently as poet-in-residence. It is here that his poems began to explore the themes of exile and family which would dominate his later work. His collection American Wake (Blackstaff, 1995), which envisions a fifth Irish province ‘where all exiles naturally land’, was followed by The Hellbox (Oxford University Press, 1998), whose title alludes to the printing trade to which his father had devoted his life. The Blind Stitch (Carcanet, 2001), extends the geography of Delanty's poems to include India, and was followed by The Ship of Birth (Carcanet Press, 2007), a collection inspired by fatherhood and committed to ‘affirming the sustaining continuity of life’. Collected Poems 1986-2006 was published by Carcanet/Oxford Poets in 2006.

Among other entries on Greg Delanty are The Oxford Companion to Irish Literature (Oxford University Press, 1996) and The Encyclopedia of the Irish in America (Notre Dame University Press, 1999)." After Delanty’s Collected Poems 1986-2006 (Carcanet Press, 2006) he has expanded his range both in form and content especially with his latest book of poems The Greek Anthology, Book XVII (Oxford Poets of Carcanet Press, England, 2012), which was released in the U.S. in 2015 as Book Seventeen (LSU Press). In an interview with the Poetry Society that took place when the Carcanet edition was published, he was asked about this book, and he used the Greek Anthology form as a way to "conjure old and new ways of looking at our contemporary world".

Other poetry collections include The New Citizen Army (Combat Paper Press), which was a book of political poems concerned with war and climate change and the general complicity of our modern lives. The covers of this book were actually made from pulped uniforms of US soldiers and the whole book was designed and produced by US military veterans.

The next book Loosestrife (Fomite, Burlington, Vermont, 2011) is a progression from that edition and has many of the same poems in it. Many of the poems in both The New Citizen Army and Loosestrife were actually taken from his previous books of poems.

He is the lead poet in the anthology So Little Time: Words and Images for a World in Climate Crisis, (Green Writers Press, Vermont 2014). The book originally was to be set around Delanty's own poems, via a suggestion to the Publisher by the environmentalist Bill McKibben, and Delanty in turn suggested that other poets be asked also, and many of the poets included were invited by him.

Bill McKibben in his envoy to So Little Time described him as "The great Vermont poet". A 2006 article in The Sunday Times said that "Greg Delanty's poems are a subtle combination of political activism and private contemplation".

His poems are widely anthologized and have appeared in American, Irish, Italian, English, Australian, Japanese and Argentinean anthologies, including the Norton Introduction to Poetry, Field Day Anthology of Irish Writing, American Poets of the New Century, 20th Century Irish Poems, Contemporary Poets of New England and The Penguin Book of Irish Poetry. His Individual poems have been published in such publications as The Atlantic formally The Atlantic Monthly, the New Statesman, The New Republic, American Scholar, The Irish Times, PN Review, and The Times Literary Supplement.

Greg Delanty is the Co-Editor with Michael Matto of the critically acclaimed and best seller on Amazon The Word Exchange: Anglo-Saxon Poems in Translation (Introduced by Seamus Heaney). New York: W.W. Norton, 2010.

Some of his other translations include Seán Ó Ríordáin's Selected Poems in Translation and Selected Poems of Kyriakos Charalambides (Cork: Southword Editions, 2005). He has also translated Aristophanes ‘The Knights’ which he retitled ‘The Suits’, and Euripides’ ‘Orestes’, which he wanted to translate to ‘The Family’, but the chance of title occurred during the actual printing of the book so it was too late to alter. Both these classical plays were translated for The Complete Greek Drama Series (Penn Greek Drama Series, 1998)

Delanty edited, with Nuala Ni Dhomhnaill, Jumping Off Shadows: Selected Contemporary Irish Poetry (Cork UP, 1995) and, with Robert Welsh, The Selected Poems of Patrick Galvin (Cork UP, 1995). He has read widely in the United States and Europe, including the Library of Congress.

Many of his poems have been broadcast on radio and television, from Garrison Kellior The Writer's Almanac to the BBC (British Broadcasting Corporation) and Radio Teilifis Éireann (Raidió Teilifís Éireann—Irish National TV and Radio Broadcasting). He also has been interviewed extensively. Two interviews worth noting are the Vermont PBS interview with Fran Stoddart in the program ‘Profiles’; and the other interview with David Hanley in the RTÉ poetry programme ‘The Enchanted Way’.

The National Library of Ireland has acquired Greg Delanty's papers up to 2010.

== Awards ==
Greg Delanty has received numerous awards including the Patrick Kavanagh Poetry Award (1983), the Allen Dowling Poetry Fellowship (1986), the Wolfers-O’Neill Award (1996–97), the Austin Clarke Award (1996), National Poetry Competition Prizewinner (Poetry Society of England, 1999) an Arts Council of Ireland Bursary (1998–99), and an award from the Royal Literary Fund (1999). He has been granted a Guggenheim Fellowship for poetry for 2007–2008.

== Bibliography ==
- Cast in the Fire Dolmen Press, 1986,
- Southward Louisiana State University Press, 1992,
- American Wake Blackstaff Press, 1995,
- The Hellbox Oxford University Press, 1998,
- The Blind Stitch Carcanet, 2001,
- Collected Poems 1986-2006 Carcanet, 2006,
- The Ship of Birth, LSU Press, 2007,
- The Word Exchange: Anglo-Saxon Poems in Translation, co-editor, W. W. Norton & Company, 2010,
- Loosestrife, Fomite, 2011,
- So Little Time: Words and Images for a World in climate Crisis, Green Writers Press, Vermont 2014,
- Book Seventeen Louisiana State University Press, 2015
- Selected Delanty: poems and translations by Greg Delanty chosen and introduced by Archie Burnett, Un-Gyve Press, 2017
- The Professor of Forgetting, Louisiana State University Press, 2023
