= Celtic Tiger =

Irish economy between 1995 and 2007

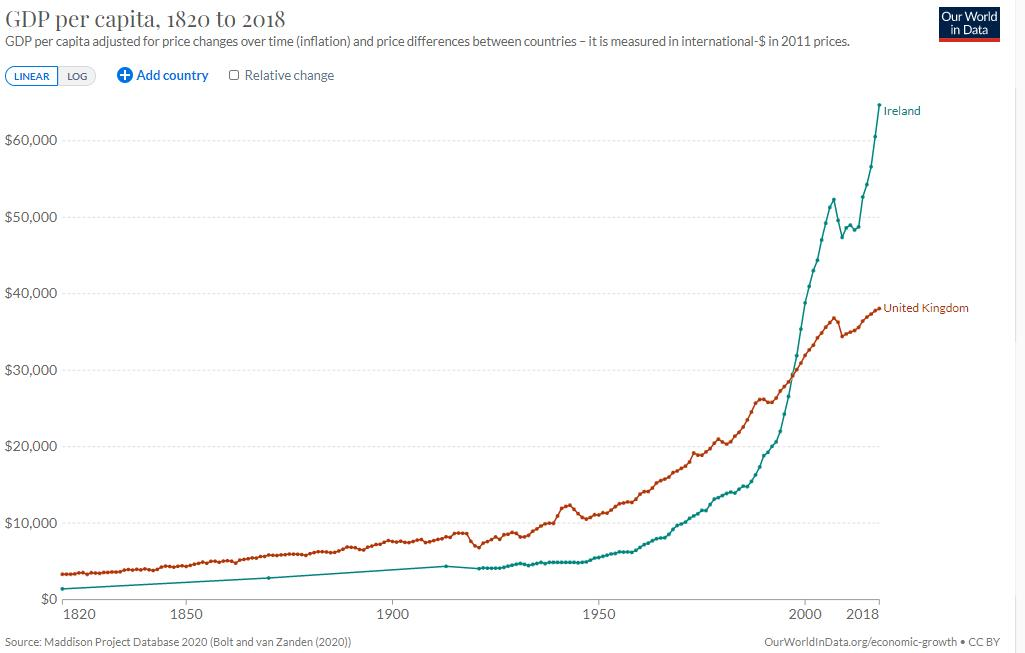
Historical GDP per capita development of Ireland and the UK

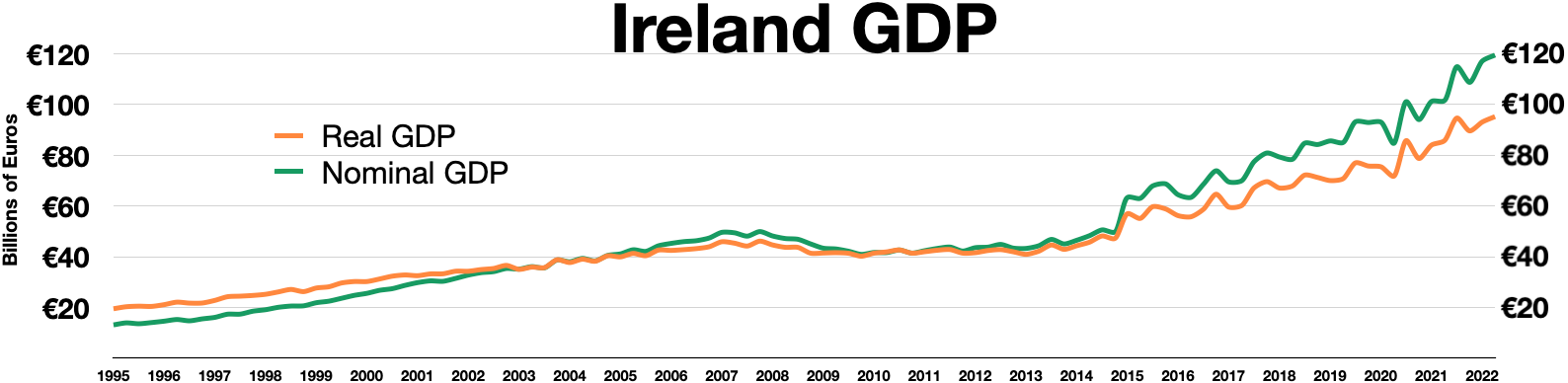
Ireland GDP Real GDP (chained 2010 Euros) Nominal GDP

The "Celtic Tiger" (Irish: An Tíogar Ceilteach) is a term referring to the economy of Ireland from the mid-1990s to the end of the first decade of the 21st century, a period of rapid real economic growth fuelled by foreign direct investment. The boom was dampened by a subsequent property bubble in 2007 which brought forth a severe economic downturn culminating in 2008's Great Recession.

At the start of the 1990s, Ireland was a relatively poor country by Western European standards, with high poverty, high unemployment, inflation, and low economic growth. The Irish economy expanded at an average rate of 9.4% between 1995 and 2000, and continued to grow at an average rate of 5.9% during the following decade until 2008, when it fell into recession. Ireland's rapid economic growth has been described as an example of a Western country matching the growth of East Asian nations, i.e. the 'Four Asian Tigers'.

The economy underwent a dramatic reversal from 2008, affected by the Great Recession and ensuing European debt crisis, with GDP contracting by 14% and unemployment levels rising to 14% by 2011. The recession lasted until 2014. In 2015, the economy posted a growth rate of 6.7% marking the beginning of a new period of strong economic growth.

== Term ==
The colloquial term "Celtic Tiger" has been used to refer to the country itself, and to the years associated with the boom. The first recorded use of the phrase is in a 1994 Morgan Stanley report by Kevin Gardiner. The term refers to Ireland's similarity to the East Asian Tigers: Hong Kong, Singapore, South Korea, and Taiwan during their periods of rapid growth between the early 1960s and late 1990s. An Tíogar Ceilteach, the Irish language version of the term, appears in the Foras na Gaeilge terminology database and has been used in government and administrative contexts since at least 2005.

The Celtic Tiger period has also been called "The Boom" or "Ireland's Economic Miracle". During that time, the country experienced a period of economic growth that transformed it from one of Western Europe's poorer countries into one of its wealthiest. The causes of Ireland's growth are the subject of some debate, but credit has been primarily given to state-driven economic development; social partnership among employers, government and trade unions; increased participation by women in the labour force; decades of investment in domestic higher education; targeting of foreign direct investment; a low corporation tax rate; an English-speaking workforce; and membership of the European Union, which provided transfer payments and export access to the Single Market.

During the 2008 financial crisis, the Celtic Tiger had all but died. Some critics, such as David McWilliams, who had been warning about impending collapse for some time, concluded: "The case is clear: an economically challenged government, perniciously influenced by the interests of the housing lobby, blew it. The entire Irish episode will be studied internationally in years to come as an example of how not to do things."

Historian Richard Aldous stated the Celtic Tiger has now gone the "way of the dodo". In early 2008, many commentators thought a soft landing was likely, but by January 2009, it seemed possible the country could experience a depression. In early January 2009, The Irish Times, in an editorial, declared: "We have gone from the Celtic Tiger to an era of financial fear with the suddenness of a Titanic-style shipwreck, thrown from comfort, even luxury, into a cold sea of uncertainty." In February 2010, a report by Davy Research concluded that Ireland had "largely wasted” its years of high income during the boom, with private enterprise investing its wealth "in the wrong places". It compared Ireland's growth to other small eurozone countries such as Finland and Belgium – noting that the physical wealth of those countries exceeds that of Ireland because of their "vastly superior" transport infrastructure, telecommunications network, and public services.

== Tiger economy ==
From 1995 to 2000, GDP growth rate ranged between 7.8 and 11.5%; it then slowed to between 4.4 and 6.5% from 2001 to 2007. During that period, the Irish GDP per capita rose dramatically to equal, then eventually surpass, that of all but one state in Western Europe. Although GDP does not represent the standard of living, and the GNP remained lower than the GDP, in 2007, the GNP achieved the same level as of some other Western European countries'.

=== Causes ===
Historian R. F. Foster argues the cause was a combination of a new sense of initiative and the entry of American corporations such as Intel. He concludes the chief factors were low taxation, pro-business regulatory policies, and a young, tech-savvy workforce. For many multinationals, the decision to do business in Ireland was made easier still by generous incentives from the Industrial Development Authority. In addition European Union membership was helpful, giving the country lucrative access to markets that it had previously reached only through the United Kingdom, and pumping huge subsidies and investment capital into the Irish economy. Frederic Mishkin has also suggested that the economic boom partly resulted from the austerity plan of Charles Haughey (Taoiseach from 1987 to 1992). People and businesses expected a stable economy, boosting their confidence to spend and invest due to anticipated stability in output.

==== Tax policy ====
Many economists credit Ireland's growth to a low corporate taxation rate (10 to 12.5% throughout the late 1990s). Since 1956, successive Irish governments have pursued low-taxation policies.

==== European Union Structural and Cohesion Funds ====
Since joining the EU in 1973, Ireland has received over €17 billion in EU Structural and Cohesion Funds. These are made up of the European Regional Development Fund (ERDF) and the European Social Fund (ESF) and were used to increase investment in the education system and to build physical infrastructure. These transfer payments from members of the European Union, such as Germany and France, were as high as 4% of Ireland's gross national product (GNP). Ireland is unique among cohesion countries, having allocated up to 35% of its Structural Funds to human resource investments, compared with an average of around 25% for other cohesion fund recipients. The Irish economy's increased productive capacity is sometimes attributed to these investments, which made Ireland more attractive to high-tech businesses, though the libertarian Cato Institute has suggested that the EU transfer payments were economically inefficient and may have actually slowed growth. The conservative Heritage Foundation also attributed to transfer payments no significant role in causing growth.

==== Trade within the European Union ====
Ireland's membership in the EU since 1973 helped the country gain access to Europe's large markets. Ireland's trade had previously been predominantly with the United Kingdom.

==== Industrial policies ====
In the 1990s, the provision of subsidies and investment capital by Irish state organisations (such as IDA Ireland) encouraged high-profile companies, such as Dell, Intel, and Microsoft, to locate in Ireland; these companies were attracted to Ireland because of its EU membership, relatively low wages, government grants, and low tax rates. Enterprise Ireland, a state agency, provides financial, technical, and social support to start-up businesses. Additionally, the building of the International Financial Services Centre in Dublin led to the creation of 14,000 high-value jobs in the accounting, legal, and financial management sectors.

In July 2003, the government established the Science Foundation Ireland on a statutory basis to promote education for highly skilled careers, particularly in biotechnology and information and communications technology, with the additional purpose to invest in science initiatives that aim to further Ireland's knowledge economy.

==== Geography and demographics ====
The time zone difference allows Irish and British employees to work the first part of each day while US workers sleep. US firms were drawn to Ireland by cheap wage costs compared to the UK, and by the limited government intervention in business compared to other EU members, and particularly to countries in Eastern Europe. Growing stability in Northern Ireland brought about by the Good Friday Agreement further established Ireland's ability to provide a stable business environment.

Irish workers can communicate effectively with Americans – especially compared to those in other low-wage, non-English-speaking EU nations, such as Portugal and Spain; this factor was vital to U.S. companies' choosing Ireland for their European headquarters. It has also been argued that the demographic dividend from the rising ratio of workers to dependents due to falling fertility, and increased female labour market participation, increased income per capita.

== Impact of economic growth ==
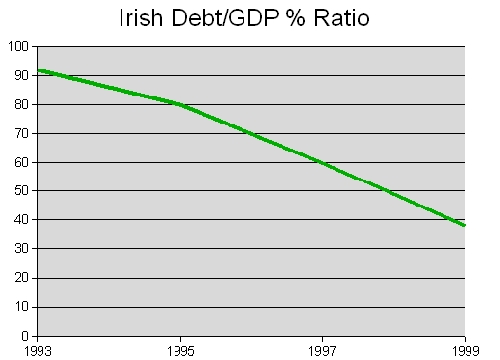
Public debt as a percentage of GDP dropped significantly over the 1990s.

Ireland was transformed from one of the poorest countries in Western Europe to one of the wealthiest. Disposable income soared to record levels, enabling a huge rise in consumer spending with foreign holidays accounting for over 91% of total holiday expenditure in 2004. However, the gap between the highest and lowest income households widened in the five-year period to 2004–2005; in response, the Economic and Social Research Institute (ESRI) stated in 2002: "On balance, budgets over the past 10 to 20 years have been more favourable to high income groups than low income groups, but particularly so during periods of high growth". Unemployment fell from 18% in the late 1980s to 4.5% by the end of 2007, and average industrial wages grew at one of the highest rates in Europe. Inflation brushed 5% per annum towards the end of the "Tiger" period, pushing Irish prices up to those of Nordic Europe, even though wage rates are roughly the same as in the UK. The national debt had remained constant during the boom, but the GDP to debt ratio rose, due to the dramatic rise in GDP.

The new wealth resulted in large investments in modernising Irish infrastructure and cities. The National Development Plan led to improvements in roads, and new transport services were developed, such as the Luas light rail lines, the Dublin Port Tunnel, and the extension of the Cork Suburban Rail. Local authorities enhanced city streets and built monuments such as the Spire of Dublin. An academic said in 2008 that the jumbo breakfast roll became "perhaps the ultimate symbol of our contemporary Celtic Tigerland", product of Irish conglomerate IAWS and eaten by busy workers buying food in filling station convenience stores.

Ireland's trend of net emigration was reversed as the republic became a destination for immigrants. This significantly changed Irish demographics and resulted in expanding multiculturalism, particularly in the Dublin, Cork, Limerick, and Galway areas. It was estimated in 2007 that 10% of Irish residents were foreign-born; most of the new arrivals were citizens of Poland and the Baltic states, many of whom found work in the retail and service sectors. A study conducted in 2006 found that many Irish people regarded immigration as an important factor for economic progress. Within Ireland, many young people left the rural countryside to live and work in urban centres. Many people in Ireland believe that the growing consumerism during the boom years eroded the country's culture, with the adoption of American capitalist ideals. While Ireland's historical economic ties to the UK had often been the subject of criticism, Peader Kirby argued that the new ties to the US economy were met with a "satisfied silence". Nevertheless, voices on the political left have decried the "closer to Boston than Berlin" philosophy of the Fianna Fáil-Progressive Democrat government. Writers such as William Wall, Mike McCormick, and Gerry Murphy have satirised these developments. Growing wealth was blamed for rising crime levels among youths, particularly alcohol-related violence resulting from increased spending power. However, it was also accompanied by rapidly increased life expectancy and very high quality of life ratings; the country ranked first in The Economist's 2005 quality of life index, dropping to 12th by 2013.

The growing success of Ireland's economy encouraged entrepreneurship and risk-taking, qualities that had been dormant during poor economic periods. However, whilst some semblance of a culture of entrepreneurship exists, foreign-owned companies account for 93% of Ireland's exports.

== Slowdown in growth, 2001–2003 ==
The Celtic Tiger's growth slowed along with the slowing in the world economy in 2002 after seven years of high growth.

The economy was adversely affected by a large reduction in investment in the worldwide information technology (IT) industry. The industry had over-expanded in the late 1990s, and its stock market equity declined sharply. Ireland was a major player in the IT industry: in 2002, it had exported US$10.4 billion worth of computer services, compared to $6.9 billion from the US. Ireland accounted for approximately 50% of all mass-market packaged software sold in Europe in 2002 (OECD, 2002; OECD, 2004).

Foot and mouth disease and the 11 September 2001 attacks damaged Ireland's tourism and agricultural sectors, deterring U.S. and British tourists. Several companies moved operations to Eastern Europe and the People's Republic of China because of a rise in Irish wage costs, insurance premiums, and a general reduction in Ireland's economic competitiveness. The rising value of the Euro hit non-EMU exports, particularly those to the U.S. and the United Kingdom.

At the same time, economies globally experienced a slowdown. The US economy grew only 0.3% in April, May, and June 2002 from a year earlier, and the Federal Reserve made 11 rate cuts that year in an attempt to stimulate the US economy. The EU scarcely grew throughout the whole of 2002, and many members' governments (notably in Germany and France) lost control of public finances, causing large deficits that broke the terms of the EMU Stability and Growth Pact.

The economic downturn in Ireland was not a recession but a slowdown in the rate of economic expansion. Signs of a recovery became evident in late 2003, as US investment levels increased once again. Many senior economists have heavily criticised the government for the economic imbalance in favour of the construction industry, and the prospect of sustaining economic growth in the future.

=== Post-2003 resurgence ===
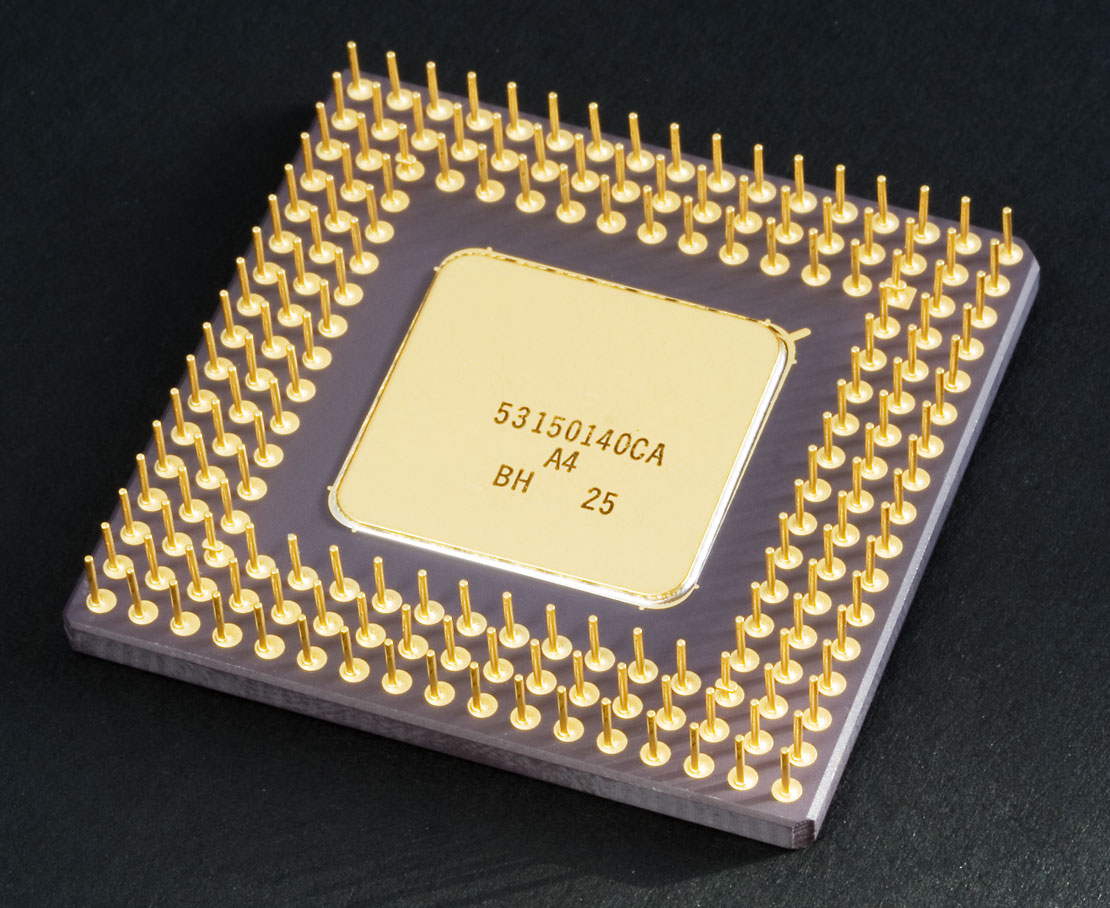
The information technology sector was a significant factor in the Irish economic boom.

After the slowdown in 2001 and 2002, Irish economic growth began to accelerate again in late 2003 and 2004. Some of the media considered that an opportunity to document the return of the Celtic Tiger – occasionally referred to in the press as the "Celtic Tiger 2" and "Celtic Tiger Mark 2". In 2004, Irish growth was the highest, at 4.5%, of the EU-15 states, and a similar figure was forecast for 2005. Those rates contrast with growth rates of 1% to 3% for many other European economies, including France, Germany, and Italy. The pace of expansion in lending to households from 2003 to 2007 was among the highest in the euro area

In 2006, there was a surge in Foreign Direct Investment and a net increase of 3,795 in IDA supported jobs, with International and Financial Services having the highest growth rate. The reasons for the continuation of the Irish economic boom were somewhat controversial within Ireland. Some Economists, Civil Rights Activists and Social Commentators have said that the growth throughout this period was merely due to a great increase in property values, and to catch-up growth in employment in the construction sector.

Globally, the U.S. recovery boosted Ireland's economy due to Ireland's close economic ties to the US. The decline in tourism as a result of foot and mouth disease and the 11 September 2001 attacks had reversed itself. The recovery of the global information technology industry was also a factor; Ireland produced 25% of all European PCs, and Apple, Dell (whose major European manufacturing plant was in Limerick), HP, and IBM all had sizeable Irish operations.

There had been a renewed investment by multinational firms. Intel had resumed its Irish expansion, Google created an office in Dublin, Abbott Laboratories was building a new Irish facility, and Bell Labs planned to open a future facility. Domestically, a new state body, Science Foundation Ireland, was established to promote new science companies in Ireland Maturing funds from the SSIA government savings scheme relaxed consumers' concerns about spending and thus fueled retail sales growth.

In September 2009, Tánaiste Mary Coughlan said Ireland had lost ground in international competitiveness every year since 2000.

== Challenges ==
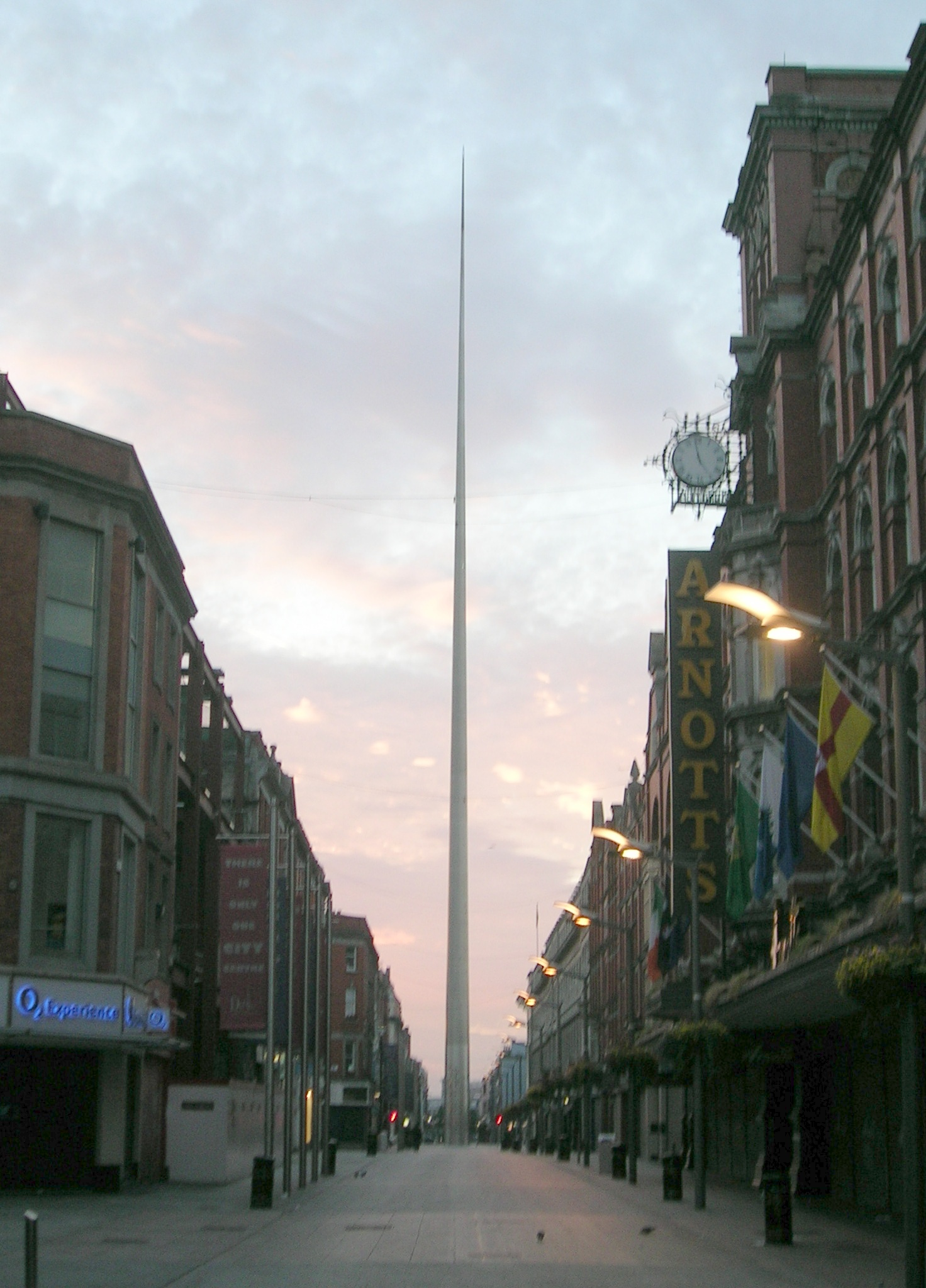
The Spire of Dublin symbolises the modernisation and growing prosperity of Ireland.

=== Property market ===
The return of the boom in 2004 was claimed to be primarily the result of the large construction sector's catching up with the demand caused by the first boom. The construction sector represented nearly 12% of GDP and a large proportion of employment among young, unskilled men. A number of sources, including The Economist, warned of excessive Irish property values. 2004 saw the construction of 80,000 new homes, compared to the UK's 160,000 – a nation that has 15 times Ireland's population. House prices doubled between 2000 and 2006; tax incentives were a key driver of this price rise, and the Fianna Fáil-Progressive Democrats government subsequently received substantial criticism for these policies.

In January 2009, UCD economist Morgan Kelly predicted that house prices would fall by 80% from peak to trough in real terms.

=== Loss of competitiveness ===
Rising wages, inflation, and excessive public spending led to a loss of competitiveness in the Irish economy. Irish wages were substantially above the EU average, particularly in the Dublin region, though many poorer Eastern European states had joined the EU since 2004, substantially lowering the average EU wage below its 1995 level. Low-paid sectors, such as retail and hospitality, remained below the EU-15 average, however. The pressures primarily affect unskilled, semi-skilled, and manufacturing jobs. Outsourcing of professional jobs also increased, with Poland in 2008 gaining several hundred former Irish jobs from the accountancy divisions of Philips and Dell.

=== Promotion of indigenous industry ===
One of the major challenges facing Ireland is the successful promotion of indigenous industry. Although Ireland boasted a few large international companies, such as AIB, CRH, Élan, Kerry Group, Ryanair, and Smurfit Kappa, there are few companies with over one billion euros in annual revenue. The government has charged Enterprise Ireland with the task of boosting Ireland's indigenous industry and launched a website in 2003 with the objective of streamlining and marketing the process of starting a business in Ireland.

=== Reliance on foreign energy sources ===
Ireland relied on imported fossil fuels for over 80% of its energy in 2006. Ireland for many years in the middle twentieth century limited its dependence on external energy sources by developing its peat bogs, building various hydroelectric projects, including a dam at Ardnacrusha on the River Shannon in 1928, developing offshore gas fields, and diversifying into coal in the 1970s. As gas, peat, and hydroelectric power have been almost fully exploited in Ireland, there is a continuously increasing need for imported fossil fuels at a time of increasing concerns about security of supply and global warming. One solution is to develop alternative energy sources, including wind power and, to a lesser extent, wave power.

An offshore wind farm operated between 2005 and 2024 off the east coast near Arklow but ceased operations due to safety concerns. A report by Sustainable Energy Ireland indicated that if wind power were properly developed, Ireland could one day be exporting excess wind power if the natural difficulties of integrating wind power into the national grid are solved. Wind power by November 2009 already accounted for 15.4% of total installed generating capacity in the state. By 2020, the Irish government forecasts that 40% of the country's energy needs will come from renewable sources, well above the EU average.

=== Distribution of wealth ===
Ireland's new wealth is unevenly distributed. The United Nations reported in 2004 that Ireland was second only to the US in inequality among Western nations. There is some opposition to the theory that Ireland's wealth has been unusually unevenly distributed, among them economist and journalist David McWilliams. He cites Eurostat figures which indicate that Ireland is just above average in terms equality by one type of measurement. Moreover, Ireland's inequality persists by other measurements. According to an ESRI report published in December 2006, Ireland's child poverty level ranks 22nd out of the 26 richest countries, and it is the 2nd most unequal country in Europe.

=== Banking scandals ===
The New York Times in 2005 described Ireland as the "Wild West of European finance", a perception that helped prompt the creation of the Irish Financial Services Regulatory Authority. Despite its mandate for stricter oversight, the agency never imposed major sanctions on any Irish institution, even though Ireland had experienced several major banking scandals in overcharging of their customers. Industry representatives disputed the idea that Ireland may be home to unchecked financial frauds. In December 2008, irregularities in directors' loans that had been kept off one bank's balance sheet for eight years forced the resignation of the Financial Regulator. Economic commentator David McWilliams has described the collapse of Anglo Irish Bank as Ireland's Enron.

== Contraction of the Tiger ==
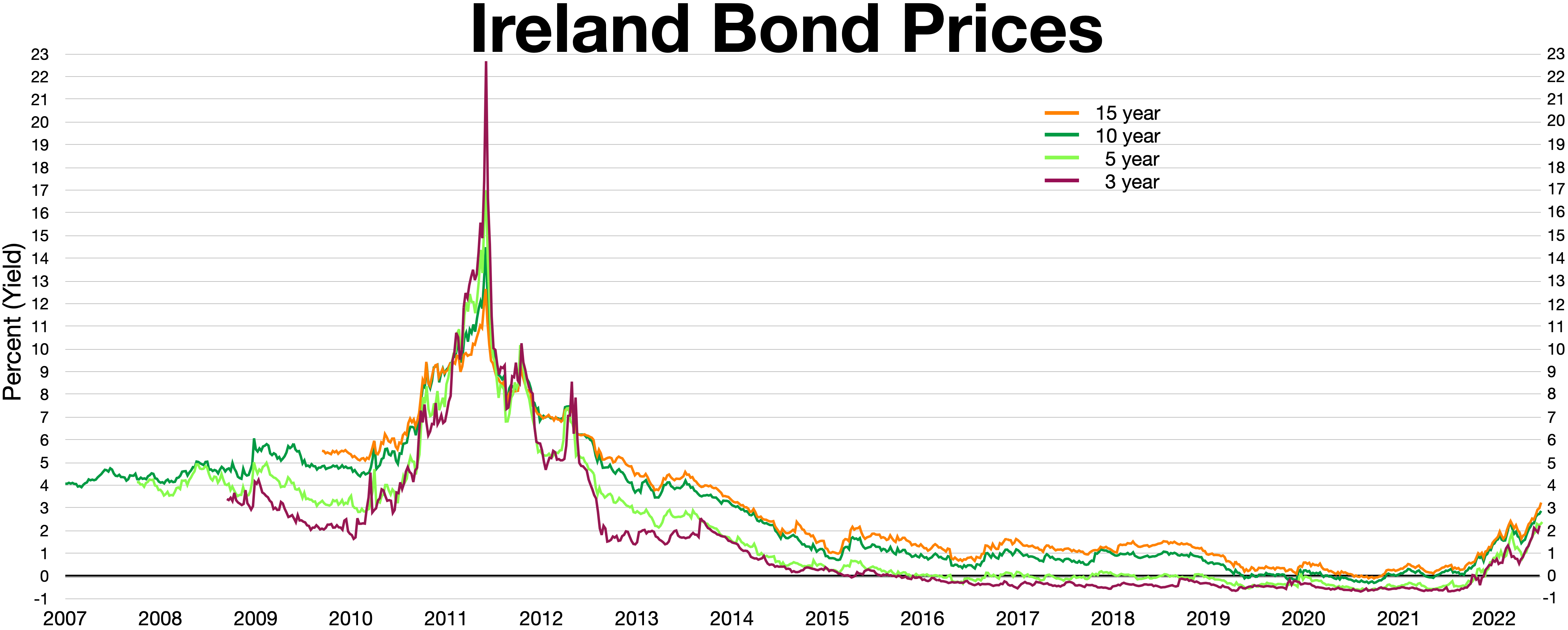
Ireland bond prices, Inverted yield curve in 2011 15 year bond 10 year bond 5 year bond 3 year bond

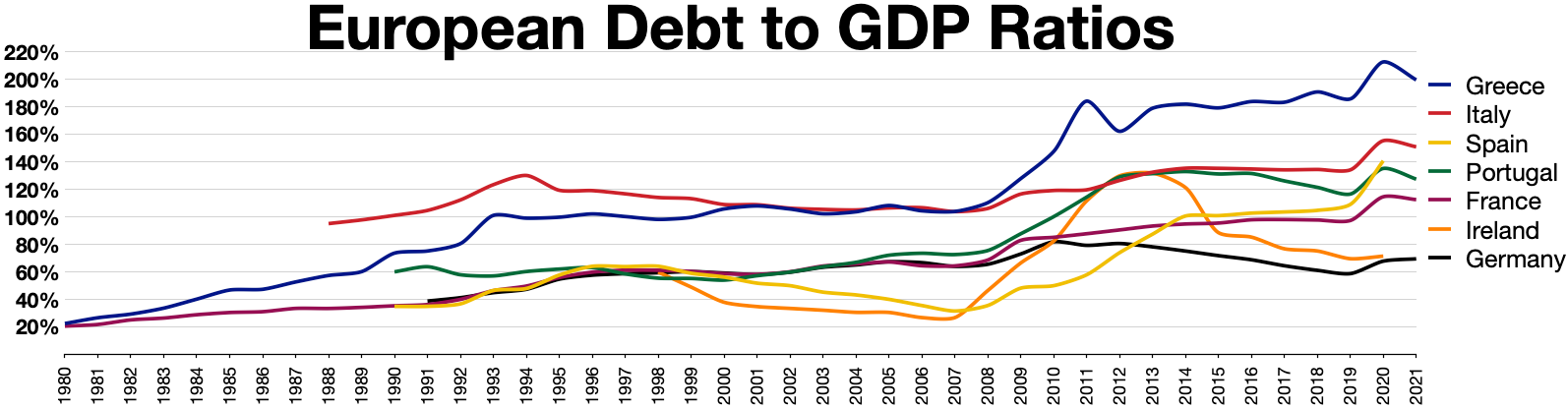
European debt to GDP ratios Greece Italy Spain Portugal France Ireland Germany

In an economic analysis, the Economic and Social Research Institute (ESRI) on 24 June 2008 forecast the possibility the Irish economy would experience marginal negative growth in 2008. This would be the first time since 1983. Outlining possible prospects for the economy for 2008, the ESRI said output of goods and services might fall that year—which would have been the Irish definition of a mild recession. It also predicted a recovery in 2009 and 2010.

In September 2008, Ireland became the first eurozone country to officially enter recession. The recession was confirmed by figures from the Central Statistics Office showing the bursting of the property bubble and a collapse in consumer spending that terminated the boom that was the Celtic Tiger. The figures show the gross domestic product (GDP), which measures the value of all the goods and services produced in the State, fell 0.8% in the second three months of 2008 compared with the same quarter of 2007. That was the second successive quarter of negative economic growth, which is one definition of a recession. The Celtic Tiger was declared dead by October 2008.

In a November 2008 interview in Hot Press, in a grim assessment of where Ireland stood, then Taoiseach Brian Cowen said many people still did not realise how badly shaken the public finances were. By 30 January 2009, Ireland's government debt had become the riskiest in the euro zone, surpassing Greece's sovereign bonds, according to credit-default swap prices. In February 2009, Taoiseach Brian Cowen said that Ireland's economy appeared on course to contract by 6.5% in 2009.

== Aftermath ==
Former Taoiseach Garret FitzGerald blamed Ireland's dire economic state in 2009 on a series of "calamitous" government policy errors. Between the years of 2000 and 2003 the then Finance Minister Charlie McCreevy boosted public spending by 48% while cutting income tax. A second problem occurred when government policies allowed, or even encouraged, a housing bubble to develop, "on an immense scale". However, he wrote nothing of the impact of the European Central Bank's low interest rates which funded the property bubble and further exacerbated the overheating economy

Nobel laureate Paul Krugman posed a prediction, stating: "As far as responding to the recession goes, Ireland appears to be really, truly without options, other than to hope for an export-led recovery, if and when the rest of the world bounces back."

The International Monetary Fund in mid-April 2009 forecast a very poor outlook for Ireland. It projected that the Irish economy would contract by 8 per cent in 2009 and by 3 per cent in 2010 – and that might be on the optimistic side.

On 19 November 2010, the Irish government began talks on a multibillion-dollar economic assistance package with experts from the International Monetary Fund (IMF) and the European Union. Unemployment in Ireland was forecasted to rise almost 17 per cent in 2010, the Economic and Social Research Institute (ESRI) stated in a report published on 28 April 2009, however, the unemployment rate in 2010 steadied at 14%. In 2010, the unemployment rate was at 14.8 per cent, and in order to escape economic downfall, Ireland requested €67.5 billion ($85.7 billion) from the International Monetary Fund and members of the euro area. Taking the money meant accepting austerity.

The economic contraction in Ireland ended in 2015, when the economy began growing. The economy began outpacing the rest of the European Union after this period. The economy of Ireland continued to grow in 2022 rising by 11%, although projected to slow.

== Cultural impact ==
The Celtic Tiger had more than just an economic impact, impacting also Ireland's social backdrop. 2007 research by the Economic and Social Research Institute, prior to the crash, found that fears over wider social inequality, declining community life, and a more selfish, materialist approach to life were largely unfounded, and that the social impact of the Celtic Tiger had largely been positive. The economic boom led to lower levels of emigration and higher immigration than had historically been the case, while the government of the time acknowledged the continuing strain on some public services and that the "provision of social housing, childcare and the integration of newcomers" remained political priorities.

== See also ==
- Baltic Tiger
- Economy of the Republic of Ireland
- Ghost estate
- Green Jersey Agenda
- Gulf Tiger
- PIGS (economics)
- Post-2008 Irish banking crisis
- Tatra Tiger
- Tiger Cub Economies
