= John Montague (poet) =

Irish poet (1929–2016)

- Born: 28 February 1929; Brooklyn, New York, U.S.
- Died: 10 December 2016 (aged 87); Nice, France
- Occupations: Poet; writer; professor
- Spouse: Elizabeth Wassell (m. 1995; d. 2016)
- Children: Oonagh; Sibyl
- Writing career
- Movement: Modernism

John Montague (28 February 1929 − 10 December 2016) was an Irish poet. Born in the United States, he was raised in Ulster in the north of Ireland. He published a number of volumes of poetry, two collections of short stories and two volumes of memoir. He was one of the best-known Irish contemporary poets. In 1998 he became the first occupant of the Ireland Professor of Poetry (essentially Ireland's poet laureate). In 2010, he was made a Chevalier de la Legion d'honneur, France's highest civil award.

== Early life ==
John Montague was born in Brooklyn, New York, on 28 February 1929. His father, James Montague, an Ulster Catholic, from County Tyrone, had emigrated to America in 1925 to join his brother John. Both were sons of John Montague, who had been a JP, combining his legal duties with being a schoolmaster, farmer, postmaster and director of several firms.

John continued as postmaster but James became involved in the turbulent Irish Republican scene in the years after 1916, particularly complicated in areas like County Fermanagh and South Tyrone, on the borders of the newly divided island.

Molly (Carney) Montague joined her husband James in America in 1928, with their two elder sons. John was born on Bushwick Avenue at St. Catherine's Hospital, and spent his earliest years playing with his brothers in the streets of Brooklyn, putting nickels on the trolley lines, playing on a tenement roof, seeing early Mickey Mouse movies.

=== Return to Garvaghey ===
Although uncle John ran a speakeasy, where he employed his brother James, life in New York was difficult during the Great Depression. After Molly became ill in 1933, the three boys were shipped back to Ireland. The two eldest went to their maternal grandmother's house in Fintona, County Tyrone, where they had been born, but John was sent to his father's home at Garvaghey, then maintained by two spinster aunts, Brigid and Freda, who welcomed the boy of four.

From New York to a farm on the edge of the Clogher Valley in County Tyrone was a significant step backwards in time. John did all the usual farming chores. He became a normal Ulster farm child, though haunted by the disparity between what the house in Garvaghey had been, in the days of his grandfather and namesake, and the reduced present. Montague reminisced about the gardens of his Ulster home in his poem, Paths.

=== Education ===
John Montague went first to Garvaghey School and then to Glencull, three miles away, where he was coached by a young and ardent master. Scholarships brought him to St. Patrick's College, Armagh, the junior diocesan seminary and the place where his Jesuit uncle, Thomas Montague, had attended. The poetry collection Time in Armagh reflects on John's time there.

Montague studied at University College Dublin in 1946. He found an extraordinary contrast between the Ulster of the war years and post-war Dublin, where the atmosphere was introverted and melancholy. Stirred by the example of other student poets (including Thomas Kinsella) he began to publish his first poems in The Dublin Magazine, Envoy, and The Bell, edited by Peadar O'Donnell. But the atmosphere in Dublin was still constrained and Montague left for Yale University on a Fulbright Fellowship in 1953.

John had already met Saul Bellow at the Salzburg Seminar in American Studies and now he worked with Robert Penn Warren. He also audited the classes of several Yale critics, including René Wellek and W. K. Wimsatt. He extended his sense of contemporary American literature, attending Indiana Summer School of Letters where he heard Richard Wilbur, Leslie Fiedler, and John Crowe Ransom, who like the Irish poet Austin Clarke, encouraged Montague, finding him a job at the Iowa Writers' Workshop in 1954 and 1955.

== Middle years: 1950s and 1960s ==
From Iowa to UC Berkeley, a year of graduate school convinced Montague that he should return to Ireland. He sailed back to France that summer, to marry his first wife, Madeleine, whom he had met in Iowa, where she was also on a Fulbright; they settled in Herbert Street, Dublin, a few doors down from Brendan Behan. Working by day at the Irish Tourist Office, Montague at last gathered his first book of poems, Poisoned Lands (1961).

That year he also moved to Paris, to a small studio a block away from Samuel Beckett, with whom he slowly became on good drinking terms. There, he also met another neighbour, the French poet Claude Esteban, with whom he became friends - Montague later translated into English and published some of his poems.

A regular rhythm of publication saw the appearance of his first book of stories, Death of a Chieftain (1964), after which the musical group The Chieftains were named, and his second and third books of poems, A Chosen Light (1967) and Tides (1970), the latter both also published by Swallow in the U.S.

All during the 1960s, Montague continued to work on his long poem, The Rough Field, a task that coincided with the outbreak of the Northern Ireland civil rights movement.

A Patriotic Suite appeared in 1966, Hymn to the New Omagh Road and The Bread God in 1968, and A New Siege, dedicated to Bernadette Devlin which he read outside Armagh Jail in 1970. In 1972, the long poem was finally published by Dolmen/Oxford and Montague returned to Ireland, to live and teach in University College Cork, at the request of Sean Lucy. His students at UCC during the 1970s included a number of writers, sometimes collectively referred to as "the Cork poets", that included Gregory O'Donoghue, Sean Dunne, Thomas McCarthy, William Wall, Maurice Riordan, Gerry Murphy, Greg Delanty and Theo Dorgan. In a birthday tribute for his 80th, William Wall wrote: "It would be impossible to overestimate his influence on the young writers who went to UCC (University College Cork) at that time." The Rough Field (1972) was slowly recognised as a major political exploration.

== Later years: 1974–2016 ==
Settled in Cork with his second wife, Evelyn Robson, Montague published an anthology, The Faber Book of Irish Verse (1974) with a book of lyrics, A Slow Dance (1975). Recognition was now beginning to come, with the award of the Irish American Cultural Institute in 1976, the first Marten Toonder Award in 1977, and in 1978, the Alice Hunt Bartlett Prize for The Great Cloak, "the best book of poetry in two years" according to the Poetry Society of Great Britain. A Guggenheim Fellowship in 1979 and 1980 enabled Montague to complete his Selected Poems (1982) and his second long poem, The Dead Kingdom (1984) both co-published by Dolmen (Ireland), Oxford (England), Wake Forest University Press (US) and Exile Editions (Canada).

In 1987, Montague was awarded an honorary doctor of letters by the State University of New York at Buffalo. Governor Mario M. Cuomo presented Montague with a citation in 1987 "for his outstanding literary achievements and his contributions to the people of New York." Montague served as distinguished writer-in-residence for the New York State Writers Institute during each spring semester, teaching workshops in fiction and poetry and a class in the English Department of the University of Albany.

In 1995, Montague and his second wife, Evelyn, separated, and he formed a partnership with American student Elizabeth Wassell (later to be the author of The Honey Plain (1997)). He has 2 daughters with Evelyn, Sibyl and Oonagh.

In 1998, Montague was named the first Irish professor of poetry, a three-year appointment to be divided among Queen's University Belfast, Trinity College Dublin, and University College Dublin. He held this title from 1998 to 2001, when he was succeeded by Nuala Ní Dhomhnaill. In 2008, he published A Ball of Fire, a collection of all his fiction including the short novella The Lost Notebook.

=== Death ===
Montague died at the age of 87 in Nice, France, on 10 December 2016 after complications from a recent surgery. He is survived by his wife Elizabeth Wassell, daughters Oonagh and Sibyl and grandchildren Eve and Theo.

== Style ==
Montague's poems chart boyhood, schooldays, love and relationships. Family and personal history and Ireland's history are also prominent themes in his poetry.

Montague is noted for his vowel harmonies, his use of assonance and echo, and his handling of the line and line break. Montague believed that a poem appears with its own rhythm and that rhythm and line lengths should be based on living speech.

== Awards and honours ==
John Montague was awarded an honorary degree of Doctor of Letters from the University of Ulster, Coleraine on 29 June 2009. In 2000, Montague was awarded The Vincent Buckley Poetry Prize. He was made Chevalier de la Legion d'honneur in 2010 and also received an honorary doctorate from the Sorbonne. In 2016, he received the Bob Hughes Lifetime Achievement Award of the Irish Book Awards.

== List of works ==
- Forms of Exile (poems) The Dolmen Press, 1958
- A Chosen Light (poems) MacGibbon and Kee, 1967
- The Rough Field (poems) The Dolmen Press, 1972
- A Slow Dance (poems) The Dolmen Press, 1975
- A Slow Dance (poems) Wake Forest University Press, 1975
- The Great Cloak (poems) The Dolmen Press, 1978
- The Great Cloak (poems) Wake Forest University Press, 1978
- The Dead Kingdom (poems) Oxford University Press, 1984
- The Rough Field, 4th Ed. Wake Forest University Press, Winston-Salem, 1984
- The Lost Notebook (a novella). Mercier Press, Cork, 1987
- Mount Eagle (poems). Wake Forest University Press, Winston-Salem, 1989
- The Rough Field,5th Ed. (poems). Wake Forest University Press, Winston-Salem, 1989
- Bitter Harvest (an anthology of recent Irish poetry). Scribners, New York, 1989
- The Figure in the Cave (essays). Syracuse University Press, Syracuse, 1989
- Born in Brooklyn (selected American writings). White Pine Press, Buffalo, 1991
- An Occasion of Sin (short stories ). Exile Editions, Toronto; White Pine Press, Buffalo, 1992
- The Love Poems. Exile Editions, Toronto, 1992; Sheep Meadow Press, New York, 1993
- The Rough Field. The Gallery Press, Ireland, 1989
- Time in Armagh (a sequence of poems). The Gallery Press, Ireland, 1993
- Collected Poems The Gallery Press, Ireland, 1995
- Collected Poems Wake Forest University Press, Winston-Salem, 1995
- Smashing The Piano The Gallery Press, Ireland, 1999
- Smashing The Piano Wake Forest University Press, Winston-Salem, 2001
- Drunken Sailor The Gallery Press, Ireland, 2004
- Drunken Sailor Wake Forest University Press, Winston-Salem, 2005
- The Rough Field, 6th Ed. Wake Forest University Press, Winston-Salem, 2005
- The Pear Is Ripe (Memoir) Liberties Press, 2007 ISBN 978-1-905483-25-9
- In My Grandfather's Mansion (Signed Limited Edition), The Gallery Press, Ireland, 2010
- Speech Lessons (poems) The Gallery Press, Ireland, 2011
- Speech Lessons (poems) Wake Forest University Press, Winston-Salem, 2012
- New Collected Poems The Gallery Press, Ireland, 2012
- The Great Bell (Signed Limited Edition) Enitharmon Press, London, 2015

=== Collections ===
- A Ball of Fire ISBN 978-1-905483-45-7
- Poisoned Lands ISBN 0-85105-319-X
- Rough Field ISBN 1-930630-21-2 ISBN 1-85235-045-8 ISBN 1-85235-044-X
- Time in Armagh ISBN 1-85235-112-8
- Tides ISBN 0-85105-177-4
