= Muddy Cup =

1997 book by Barbara Fischkin

Muddy Cup: A Dominican Family Comes of Age in a New America
- Author: Barbara Fischkin
- Genre: Creative nonfiction
- Set in: 1980s and 1990s New York City
- Publisher: Scribner
- Publication date: 1997
- Pages: 368
- ISBN: 978-0-684-80704-1

Muddy Cup: A Dominican Family Comes of Age in a New America is a nonfiction book by Barbara Fischkin, published by Scribner in 1997. The book focuses on a family from the Dominican Republic and their immigration to New York City, and was developed after Fischkin wrote a feature series about the family in the mid-1980s while a reporter at Newsday.

== Background ==
As a reporter for Newsday in the mid-1980s, Barbara Fischkin wrote a weekly feature for a year about members of the Almonte family and their experiences with immigration from the Dominican Republic to New York City.

Fischkin developed the book during ten years after the initial news reporting, and included some of the immigrant experiences of her Jewish parents from Eastern Europe.

The title of the book is from a poem by John Montague with the lines "My mother's memories / of America / A muddy cup / she refused to drink."

== Reception ==
A review by Kathleen Krog published in the Chicago Tribune describes the book as "an engrossing, engaging update of the traditional immigrant saga." Kirkus Reviews states, "Fischkin smoothly and gracefully tells a complex tale by interweaving parents' and children's vastly different perspectives, as well as an account of the Dominican Republic's troubled history."

According to Publishers Weekly, "Although her story focuses on a single family, it reflects the human toll of U.S. immigration policy, which in its effort to limit visas to those who won't become a burden on the welfare system can separate families, as it did the Almontes." Ed Morales, a staff writer for The Village Voice, in a review published in Newsday, notes the role Fischkin's 1980s reporting had on bringing attention and eventual action to address Almonte children who were initially denied entry to the United States, and writes, "While Fischkin shows that the deep ambivalence of the immigrant experience has been passed on to a new generation, she also provides a timely reminder that the suffering and exhilaration of that experience is at the core of American identity."

In a review for Library Journal, Tricia Gray says Fischkin "gives an intimate account of immigrant life in contemporary America, with all the bureaucratic quagmires, language barriers, and transformations that are involved", and that the "masterfully woven tale strikes at the heart of the American identity". Philip Herter writes in a review for the St. Petersberg Times, "Dominican history is key, especially the miserable years of the Trujillo dictatorship, a grim regime supported by Washington, when thousands disappeared and social progress withered. Coming to America, we are reminded, has made sense for a long time."

== See also ==
- Dominican Americans
- American Jews
