= Celia de Fréine =

Irish poet, playwright, screenwriter and librettist

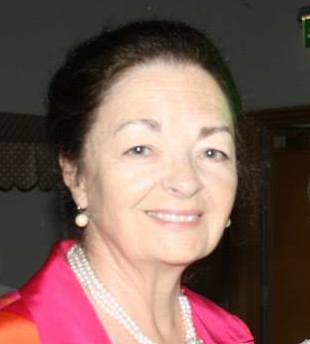
- Occupation: Writer
- Website: www.celiadefreine.com

Celia de Fréine (born 1948) is a poet, playwright, screenwriter and librettist who writes in Irish and English.

== Background ==
Celia de Fréine was born in Newtownards, County Down. At an early age, she moved with her family to Dublin, maintaining strong links with her extended family in the North. She was educated at University College Dublin and Lancaster University. She worked as a civil servant and as a teacher, and now divides her time between Dublin and Connemara.

== Poetry ==
De Fréine has published six collections of poetry.

=== Faoi Chabáistí is Ríonacha ===
Her first collection Faoi Chabáistí is Ríonacha (Cló Iar-Chonnachta, 2001) was awarded Duais Aitheantais Ghradam Litríochta Chló Iar-Chonnachta in 1999. It has been translated to Romanian by Christian Tamas (Ars Longa, Romania 2003) and to Bulgarian by Vergil Nemchev (Orpheus Press, Bulgaria 2003).

"As for the world of de Freine's poems, it is unmistakeable once you are in it. It is like surrealism without any intrusive special effects which might have taken it out of the everyday of experience. Gender is turned inside out..." Bernard O'Donoghue

"And most of these poems have stunning closures that, with well-planned oxymora, waylay the reader's expectations, just as a poem ought." New Hibernia Review

=== Fiacha Fola ===
Her second collection, Fiacha Fola (Cló Iar-Chonnachta, 2004), which gives an account of the Anti-D scandal in Ireland, was awarded Gradam Litríochta Chló Iar-Chonnacht in 2004.

"In this incredibly powerful collection, Celia de Fréine has given us an absolute page-turner. Fiacha Fola is the best collection of poetry I have read this year." Aine Ni Ghlinn

=== Scarecrows at Newtownards ===
Her first collection in English Scarecrows at Newtownards was published by Scotus Press in 2005.

"Bravery, cowardice, risk, trust – de Fréine surveys the disputed frontier of male and female territories with a lucid, ironic but finally humane eye. The death of poetry, I heard someone say. Not with books like this around. More like the death of criticism if poetry like this is not widely praised and recognised." Books Ireland

=== imram : odyssey ===
In 2010 Arlen House published a bilingual collection imram : odyssey which takes its cue from the imram genre of Irish Literature and was inspired by a visit to Slovenia.

=== Aibítir Aoise : Alphabet of an Age ===
Published by Arlen House in 2011, Aibítir Aoise : Alphabet of an Age, draws on a Polish genre that invites the author to discuss what (s)he has observed during his/her life. Usually written in prose, de Fréine has adapted it to poetic form.

=== cuir amach seo dom : riddle me this ===
Published by Arlen House in 2014. The title poem of this collection, which de Fréine wrote while in Slovenia, takes its cue from the riddle, a traditional Slovene form. Also included in the collection are the sequences The Lady and the Unicorn : An Bhean Uasal is an tAonadharcach and Monsanto, written in Paris and Portugal respectively.

=== Other collections and awards ===
De Fréine's poetry has been widely anthologised and has won many additional awards, including the Patrick Kavanagh Award (1994) and the British Comparative Literature Association Translation Award (1999).

== Plays ==
De Fréine's plays have been widely produced and won many awards.

In 2000, Nára Turas é in Aistear was produced by Amharclann de hÍde at The New Theatre, Dublin, and at the Galway Town Hall Theatre.

In 2004, Anraith Neantóige was produced by Aisling Ghéar at Theatre Space @ the Mint, at the Dublin Theatre Festival Fringe and toured nationwide.

"Chruthaigh de Fréine go minic go raibh ar a cumas friotal filíochta a chur ar mhothúcháin mná agus is é baois agus barbarthacht na cogaíochta agus dearcadh na mban ina leith is ábhar do Anraith Neantóige. Tá beirt bhan ina gcónaí le chéile in áit iargúlta ar an sliabh, áit a shíleann siad bheith measartha slán ó na buamaí atá ag titim mórthimpeall orthu. Tagann fear óg aníos ón chathair chucu ó am go céile chun bia a thabhairt dóibh agus siamsaíocht a chur ar fáil." Máiréad Ní Chinnéide, The Irish Times.

Anraith Neantóige was awarded Duais an Oireachtais for best full-length play in 2003; in 2005 Cóirín na dTonn won the same award as did Tearmann in 2006. Tearmann was also awarded Duais Fhoras na Gaeilge at Listowel Writers' Week in the same year. These three plays were published in a collection, entitled Mná Dána by Arlen House in 2009.

Also in 2009, the Abbey Theatre commissioned her short play Casadh which was given a rehearsed reading at the Peacock Theatre in Dublin and at An Chultúrlann in Belfast as part of the Gach Áit Eile series.

In 2013, Beholden was given a rehearsed reading at the National Gallery of Ireland and the Pavilion Theatre, Dún Laoghaire, and in 2012 Present was given a rehearsed reading at the Pavilion Theatre, as part of Pavilion Playwrights 8 X 10. Stamen was given a rehearsed reading as part of 8 x 10 Sex in 2014.

In 1982, Brian Merriman's The Midnight Court, which she translated and dramatised was produced by the Dublin Shakespeare Society at The Studio, North Great George's Street, Dublin. In 2007 the same company produced a revised version at Theatre 36, Dublin as part of their centenary celebrations.

In 2012, Arlen House published three of de Fréine's plays in book form: Desire: Meanmarc; Cúirt an Mheán Oíche: The Midnight Court; and, Plight: Cruachás. This series of plays deals with Brian Merriman and his The Midnight Court.

Other productions include:

- Were Man But Constant (from Shakespeare's comedies), The Studio, North Great George's Street, Dublin, 1982.
- The Courting of Emer, Temple Bar Studios, Dublin, 1985.
- Diarmuid agus Gráinne, Halla Uí Dhonnabháin Rossa, Dublin, 1986.
- I Have Seen The Stars, Dublin Theatre FestivalFringe, 1988.
- Holloway 1918, (Rehearsed Reading), An Béal Bocht, Dublin, 1989.
- Two Girls in Silk Kimonos, (Rehearsed Reading), Peacock Theatre, Dublin, 1991.

== Films ==
In 2007 filmmaker Biju Viswanath developed a series of short films based on her poems. These include Lorg / Quest, Seal / Sojourn, Cluiche / Game and Beatha / Life.

Lorg/ Quest, was screened at the Irish Film Institute during the 2007 Imram Festival of Literature, 2007. It received its US premiere at the Atlanta Indo-American Film Festival in 2008. Seal / Sojourn was screened at this festival also, having premiered at the New Jersey Independent South Asian Cine Fest earlier the same year. Cluiche / Game premiered at the Ranelagh Arts Festival-Minicinefest also in 2008.

In October 2009 the world premiere of Marathon, which she wrote in association with Viswanath, took place during the New York International Film Festival, scooping awards for best screenplay and best cinematography.

== Libretti ==
In 2009, Living Opera, in association with Opera Ireland, presented a showcase performance of the opera The Earl of Kildare at the Mermaid Arts Centre in Bray. Music was composed by Fergus Johnston and the libretto by de Fréine.

== Television ==
Celia de Fréine was a scriptwriter for the TG4 series Ros na Rún between 1997 and 1999. The first script which she wrote was shortlisted for the Celtic Film and Television Festival in 1998.

== Translation ==
De Fréine has translated many European poets into Irish and English, including: Rainer Maria Rilke, Xohana Torres, and Catullus, as well as the Gujarati poets, Ramesh Parekh, Dileep Jhaveri, and Kamal Vora.

== Publications ==
- Faoi Chabáistí is Ríonacha: Cló Iar-Chonnachta 2000; (Romanian translation) Ars Longa, Romania 2003; (Bulgarian translation) Orpheus Press, Sofia.
- Fiacha Fola, Cló Iar-Chonnachta, Connemara, 2004
- Scarecrows at Newtownards, Scotus Press, Dublin, 2005
- Mná Dána, Arlen House, Galway, 2009
- imram : odyssey, Arlen House, Galway, 2010.
- Aibítir Aoise : Alphabet of an Age, Arlen House, Galway, 2011.
- Desire: Meanmarc, Arlen House, Galway, 2012.
- Cúirt an Mheán Oíche : The Midnight Court, Arlen House, Galway, 2012.
- Plight: Cruachás, Arlen House, Galway, 2012.
- cuir amach seo dom : riddle me this, Arlen House, Galway, 2014.

=== Non-fiction ===
- The Decline and Rise of Irish, Irish Writers’ Centre Italo-Irish Literary Exchange brochure, 2013.
- Women Playwrights, Whither?, published in Creation, Publishing, and Criticism (Peter Lang), 2010.
- Writing Poetry in Irish, published in Poetry, Reading it, Writing it, Publishing it (Salmon Poetry), 2009.
- A Soap for TnaG: "Writing Ros na Rún", (New Hibernia Review Vol 3, No 1, Spring 1999).
- On the Border of Memory: Childhood in a Divided Ireland (New Hibernia Review Vol 8, No 1, Spring 2004).

=== Fiction ===
- Prime Cut (short story), shortlisted for the Ian St James Award and published in The New Writer (April 1999).
- Birthday Present, (short story) was published in the anthology Noir by Noir West (Arlen House, 2014).
- An Dara Rogha (novel), a dystopian, post-apocalyptic, speculative fiction novel (LeabhairCOMHAR, 2022)

== Awards ==
- Patrick Kavanagh Award, 1994
- Comórtas Filíochta Dhún Laoghaire (Dán Gaeilge), 1996
- Sparánacht sa Litríocht (An Chomhairle Ealaíon), 1997
- British Comparative Literature Association Translation Award, 1999
- Duais Aitheantais Ghradam Litríochta Chló Iar-Chonnachta, 1999
- Sparánacht sa Litríocht (An Chomhairle Ealaíon), 2000
- Smurfit/Lá International Poetry Award Samhain Festival (Dán Gaeilge), 2003
- Duais an Oireachtais (Award for play Anraith Neantóige), 2003
- Gradam Litríochta Chló Iar-Chonnachta, 2004
- Duais an Oireachtais (Award for play Cóirín na dTonn), 2005
- Duais an Oireachtais(Award for play Tearmann), 2006
- Duais Fhoras na Gaeilge Listowel Writers' Week (for Tearmann), 2006
- Best screenplay (with Biju Viswanath) at the New York International Film Festival, 2009.
- Best international short (with Biju Viswanath) at the New York International Film Festival, 2010.
- Duais an Oireachtais(Award for play Meanmarc), 2010
- Duais an Oireachtais (script teilifíse, Cuir i gCás), 2011
- Sparánacht sa Litríocht (An Chomhairle Ealaíon), 2013

== Sources ==
- Oxford Concise Companion to Irish Literature, Oxford University Press, 2000
- 22 October: Walking the Walk-Political Activism, frontlinedefenders.org. Accessed 3 December 2022.
