= Paddy Bushe =

Irish poet (born 1948)

- Born: Paddy Bushe; 1948 (age 77–78); Dublin, Ireland
- Occupation: Poet

Paddy Bushe is an Irish poet.

== Life ==
Paddy Bushe (Paddy de Buis) was born in Dublin in 1948. He lives in Waterville, County Kerry.

He writes poetry in both English and Irish. He has also translated Chinese poems into English and Irish. In addition, he has translated some of the poems by Sorley MacLean from Scottish Gaelic into Irish.

== Works ==
=== Poetry ===
- Poems With Amergin (Dublin, Beaver Row Press, 1989)
- Teanga (Baile Átha Cliath, Coiscéim, 1990)
- Counsellor (Kerry, Sceilg Press, 1991)
- Digging Towards The Light (Dublin, Dedalus Press, 1994)
- In Ainneoin na gCloch (Coiscéim, 2001)
- Hopkins on Skellig Michael (Dublin, Dedalus Press, 2001)
- The Nitpicking of Cranes (Dedalus Press, 2004)
- To Ring in Silence, new and selected poems (Dedalus Press, 2008)
- My Lord Buddha of Carraig Eanna (Dedalus Press, 2012).
- Second Sight: Poems in Irish with English Versions by the Author (Daedalus Press, 2020)

== Awards ==
- Member, Aosdána
- 2006: Oireachtas na Gaeilge prize for poetry
- 2006: Michael Hartnett Poetry Award
- 2016: The Irish Times Poetry Now Award for On A Turning Wing (Dedalus 2016)

== See also ==
- List of Irish writers
