= Sheila O'Hagan =

Irish writer and poet

Sheila O’Hagan (died 30 December 2017) was a Dublin-based writer and poet.

== Biography ==
Sheila O'Hagan began writing poetry in 1984 while studying at Birkbeck College, London University. She was a teacher of Creative Writing and reviewer, had given a workshop in Wormwood scrubs prison and was Writer-in-residence for County Kildare.

As a mentor and encourager, O'Hagan was a prominent presence on the Dublin writing scene during the 1990s and onwards for about fifteen years. She ran what became known as "The St. Stephen's Green Writers' Workshop" at her apartment on St Stephen's Green, which included many published, or about-to-be-published, and/or prize-winning authors, among them Tom French, Jean O'Brien, John O'Donnell, Mary O'Donnell, Eugene O'Connell, Clar Ni Aonghusa and Alison Maxwell.

She died on 30 December 2017.

== Awards ==
She won the Patrick Kavanagh Poetry Awardin 1991, the Goldsmith Award for Poetry in 1988, and the Hennessey/Sunday Tribune Award for New Irish Poet of the Year in 1992. and the Listowel Writers Week, 1990/1998.

== Poetry books ==
- The Peacock's Eye (Salmon Publishing, 1992)
- The Troubled House (Salmon Publishing, 1995)
- Along the Liffey: Poems & Short Stories (Salmon Poetry, 2009)
