= Gaetano Tranchino =

Sicilian painter (born 1938)

- Born: 1938 (age 87–88); Ortygia, Syracuse, Sicily, Italy
- Died: September 03 2026 Age 88; Siracusa
- Occupation: Painter
- Years active: 1964–2026
- Style: Naïve
- Website: gaetanotranchino.com

Gaetano Tranchino (born 1938) is an Italian naïve painter, primarily known for his still-life works of art. His art mainly depicts scenes from Sicily. According to writer and novelist Leonardo Sciascia, Tranchino's work is influenced by writers such as Jorge Luis Borges and Joseph Conrad.

== Early life ==
Tranchino was born in Syracuse, Sicily, on the island of Ortygia, in 1938. Fina Serena Barbagallo's 2015 monograph discusses Tranchino's upbringing and early career in Ortygia, Syracuse.

== Career ==
Tranchino held his first exhibitions in the 1960s and later presented solo and group shows in Italy and abroad. His work was exhibited in Dublin in 2010 at RUA RED (Tallaght) under the title The Place of Memory, receiving a review in The Irish Times. In 2022, he presented I luoghi della memoria ('Places of Memory'), an exhibition of about twenty paintings featuring motifs of architecture, figures, and objects.

== Style and themes ==
In his 2010 review, Aidan Dunne of The Irish Times points to the storytelling and surreal qualities present in Tranchino’s work. Dunne described the works as "pictorial fables" that combined warmth with controlled nostalgia. Leonardo Sciascia addressed Tranchino’s painting in Corriere della Sera, situating it in relation to memory and literature. The 2015 monograph by Fina Serena Barbagallo surveyed Tranchino’s motifs, development, and references to Sicilian settings.

== Reception ==
Tranchino's work has been discussed by national press critics such as Aidan Dunne in The Irish Times and by Italian literary figures, notably Leonardo Sciascia.

== Illustration and collaborations ==
Tranchino has illustrated books published by Ireland's Dedalus Press. His drawings appear in the anthology The Word Ark: A Pocket Book of Animal Poems (2020), edited by poet Pat Boran.

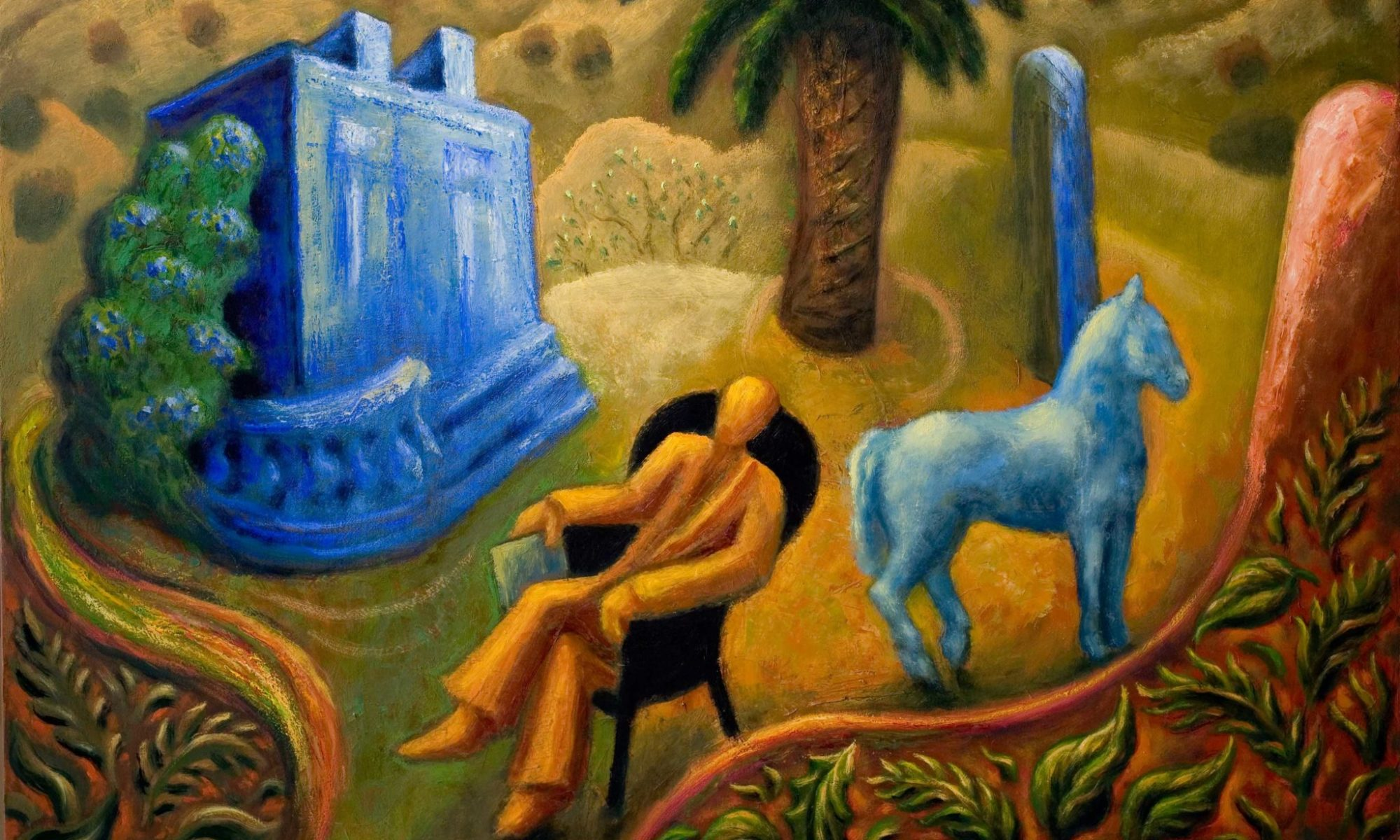
Casa azzurra con giardino / 'Blue house with a Garden'

== Illustrative work ==
Irish poet Pat Boran has featured Tranchino's artwork on several book covers. The anthology The Word Ark: A Pocket Book of Animal Poems includes Tranchino's line drawings as illustrations. Boran also wrote the catalogue introduction to one of Tranchino's exhibitions and is involved with the official Gaetano Tranchino website.
