= Roz Cowman =

Irish poet and critic

- Born: 1942 (age 83–84); County Cork

Roz Cowman (born 1942), is an Irish poet and critic.

== Biography ==
Roz Cowman was born in Cork in 1942. She got her education in the Loreto Convent in Clonmel before going on to study in University College Cork. She worked as a teacher and writes poetry. In 1982 Cowman won the Arlen House/Maxwell House award and an Art's Council Bursary. Cowman won the Patrick Kavanagh Poetry Award in 1985. She has been published in Ireland, Britain and America. Her work is collected into a single anthology, The Goose Herd. Eavan Boland said 'These are poems which have a consistent authority.'

== Bibliography ==
- The Goose Herd (1989)
- The Empty Quarter (1995)
- The Salmon Poets (1996)
- Women Creating Women: Contemporary Irish Women Poets (1997)
- Nobody Else Remembers, but I Remember (1999)
