= Michael Coady (poet) =

Irish poet, writer and journalist (1939–2024)

Michael Coady (1939 – 25 March 2024) was an Irish poet, writer, historian, photographer, genealogist, and journalist.

== Life and career ==
Coady was educated at University College Galway and University College Cork. He was a Heimbold Professor of Irish Studies at Villanova University in the United States. His poetry and short stories have been included in many anthologies. Bursaries from the Arts Council enabled him to travel in the U.S. and Newfoundland and he held a residency in the Irish Cultural Centre in Paris. He was a member of Aosdána.

His awards included The Patrick Kavanagh Poetry Award in 1979, the Lawrence O’Shaughnessy Award in 2004 and he was a prizewinner in the Francis MacManus competition for short stories in 1987 and 1993.

Coady died on 25 March 2024. He was 84.

== Critique of his work ==
His work is noted for its celebration of place, particularly his home town and the people who live there. It has also been praised for its compassion and its successful fusion of literary language with the reported demotic of his community. Coady wrote about the small, intimate, urban community (surrounded by rural countryside) to which he belonged. His literary strategy follows that of Patrick Kavanagh in celebrating the local and parochial.

== Publications ==
=== Poetry books ===
- Two for a Woman, Three for a Man (Gallery Press, 1980)
- Oven Lane (Gallery Press, 1987)
- All Souls (Gallery Press, 1997)
- One Another (Gallery Press, 2003)
- Going by Water (Gallery Press, 2009)

=== Non Fiction ===
The Well of Spring Water (memoir of the Clare musicians Pakie and Micho Russel, 1996)

=== Essays ===
Full Tide - A Miscellany (Relay Books, 1999)
