= Pat Boran =

Irish poet (born 1963)

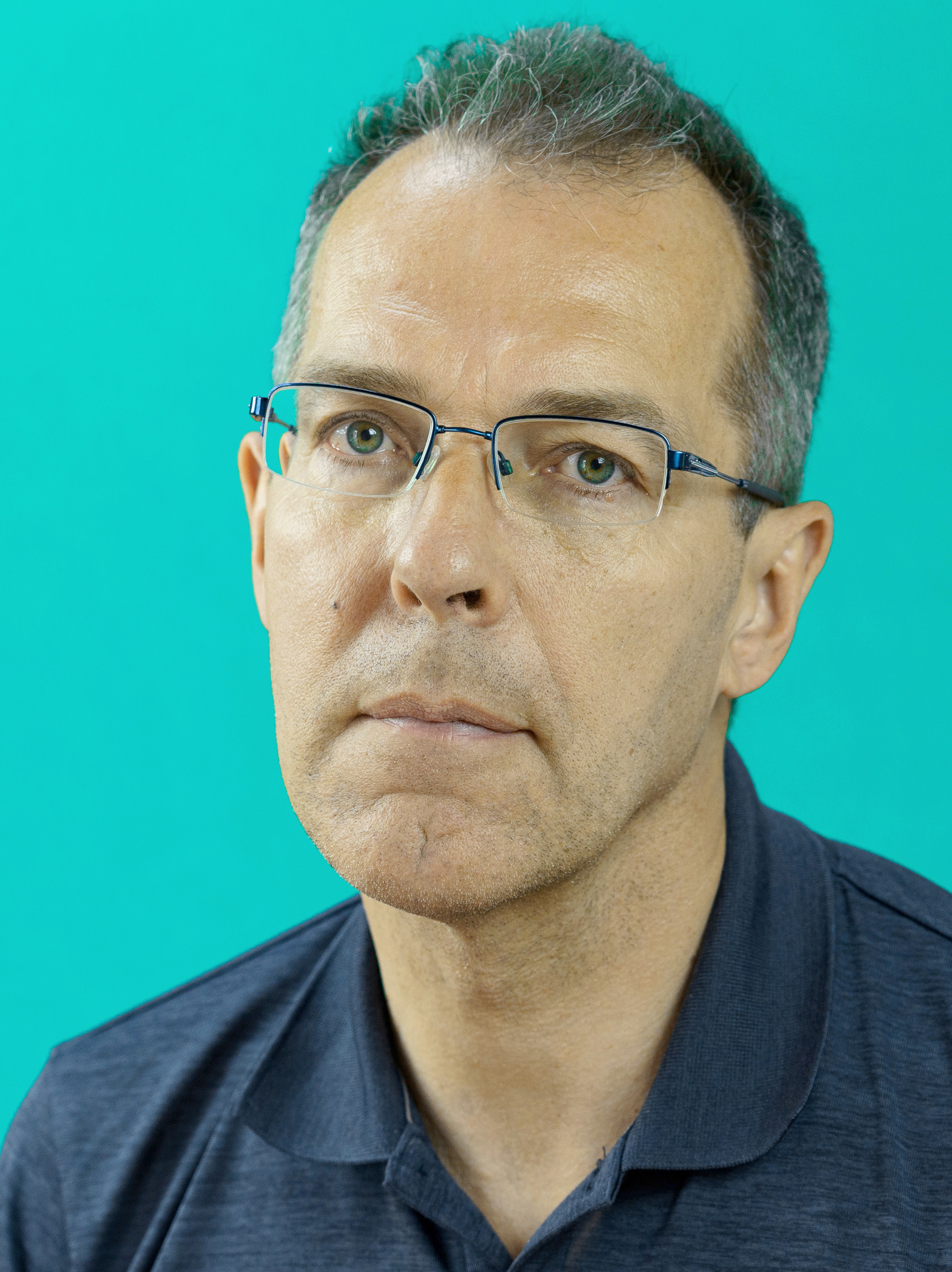
- Born: 1963 (age 62–63); Portlaoise, County Laois, Ireland
- Occupation: Poet
- Writing career
- Notable awards: Patrick Kavanagh Poetry Award (1989)
- Website: patboran.com

Pat Boran (born 1963) is an Irish poet. He has published numerous collections of his work, and is also the publisher of Dedalus Press. In 1989 he won the Patrick Kavanagh Poetry Award.

== Biography ==
Born in Portlaoise, Boran has lived in Dublin for a number of years. He is the publisher of the Dedalus Press which specialises in contemporary poetry from Ireland, and international poetry in English-language translation, and was until 2007 Programme Director of the annual Dublin Writers Festival. Formerly the presenter of "The Poetry Programme", a weekly half-hour poetry programme on RTÉ Radio 1, he has interviewed poets such as Tess Gallagher, Tony Curtis, John Haynes, Gerry Murphy and Jane Hirshfield.

His poetry publications include The Unwound Clock (1990), History and Promise (1991), Familiar Things (1993), The Shape of Water (1996), As the Hand, the Glove (2001) and The Next Life (2012). His New and Selected Poems (2005), with an introduction by the Dennis O'Driscoll, was first published by Salt Publishing UK and was reissued in 2007 by Dedalus Press. Waveforms: Bull Island Haiku, a book-length haiku sequence or rensaku that explores the interplay of flora, fauna and human activity on Dublin Bay's Bull Island was published in 2015 by Orange Crate Books. The book also features the author's own photographs. A Man Is Only As Good: A Pocket Selected Poems was published in 2017, also by Orange Crate Books. In 2019, he published the poetry collection Then Again (Dedalus Press, 2019) and, in 2024, Hedge School (Dedalus Press). Single-poem volumes, illustrated with the author's photographs, include The Statues of Emo Court (Orange Crate Books, 2021), Building the Ark (Orange Crate Books, 2022) and On a Wave of Light (Orange Crate Books, 2023). Volumes of his selected poems have appeared in Italian, Hungarian, Portuguese and Macedonian. His writers' handbook, The Portable Creative Writing Workshop (2005), is now in its fourth edition while his A Short History of Dublin (2000) is published by Mercier Press. In 2007, Boran was elected to the membership of Aosdána, the Irish affiliation of artists and writers. In 2019, Boran co-edited a volume of poetry with Chiamaka Enyi-Amadi, Writing Home: The New Irish Poets.

Since 2020, he has also made more than a dozen short poetry films which have been shown at film and literary festivals in Ireland and abroad.

== Awards and honours ==
- 1989 - Patrick Kavanagh Poetry Award
- 2007 - Elected member of Aosdána
- 2008 - Lawrence O'Shaughnessy Award for Irish Poetry from the University of St. Thomas.

== Works ==
=== Poetry books ===
- 1990: The Unwound Clock (Dedalus Press)
- 1990: History and Promise (IUP)
- 1993: Familiar Things (Dedalus Press)
- 1996: The Shape of Water (Dedalus Press)
- 2001: As the Hand, the Glove (Dedalus Press)
- 2007: New and Selected Poems (Dedalus Press)
- 2012: The Next Life (Dedalus Press)
- 2015: Waveforms: Bull Island Haiku (Orange Crate Books, via Dedalus press)
- 2017: A Man Is Only As Good: A Pocket Selected Poems (Orange Crate Books, distributed by Dedalus Press)
- 2018: o sussurro da corda Selected poems in Portuguese translation by Francisco José Craveiro de Carvalho (ediçóes Eufeme)
- 2019: Then Again (Dedalus Press)
- 2021: The Statues of Emo Court (Orange Crate Books)
- 2021: The Statues of Emo Court A single-poem volume, illustrated with stills from the poet's film of the same name (Orange Crate Books)
- 2022: Building the Ark A single-poem volume, illustrated with stills from the poet's film of the same name (Orange Crate Books)
- 2022: On a Wave of Light A single-poem volume, illustrated with stills from the poet's film of the same name (Orange Crate Books)

=== Anthologies ===
- 2006: Wingspan: A Dedalus Sampler (Dedalus). An introduction to some of the Irish and international poets on the Dedalus list.
- 2008: Flowing Still: Irish Poets on Irish Poetry (Dedalus). Essays by some of the best-known names in contemporary Irish writing.
- 2011: The Bee-Loud Glade: A Living Anthology of Irish Poetry (Dedalus). Anthology of some twenty Irish poets together with accompanying audio CD of selected poems set to music and performed by Crazy Dog Audio Theatre.
- 2011: Shine On: Irish Writers for Shine (Dedalus Press), Irish poets and fiction writers in support of those affected by mental ill health
- 2012: Airborne: Poetry from Ireland (Dedalus Press). Anthology of contemporary Irish poetry exclusive to iBooks platform.
- 2014: If Ever You Go: A Map of Dublin in Poetry and Song (Dedalus Press), edited with Gerard Smyth. Dublin: One City, One Book designated title, 2014.
- 2017: The Deep Heart's Core: Irish Poets Revisit a Touchstone Poem (Dedalus Press), edited with Eugene O'Connell.
- 2020: The Word Ark: A Pocket Book of Animal Poems (Dedalus Press), illustrated by Gaetano Tranchino.

=== Fiction ===
- 1991: Strange Bedfellows (Salmon)
- 1998: All the Way from China (Poolbeg)

=== Non-fiction ===
- 2000: A Short History of Dublin (Mercier)
- 2005: The Portable Creative Writing Workshop (New Island)
- 2009: The Invisible Prison: Scenes from an Irish Childhood (Dedalus Press)
