= Padraig Rooney =

Padraig Rooney (born 1956) is an Irish poet, short-story writer and novelist who was born in Monaghan, Ireland.

== Life ==
Rooney was born in Monaghan, Ireland and studied at Maynooth College and at the Sorbonne. He has travelled extensively all his life, living in Paris, Bangkok, Yokohama, Rome, Budapest and, latterly, in Switzerland. He was the recipient of two Irish Arts Council bursaries. He has taught abroad for many years and currently resides in Switzerland as an IB English teacher.

His poems and stories have appeared in Best Irish Short Stories 2 & 3 (Paul Elek, 1977, 1978), Phoenix Irish Short Stories, Scanning the Century: The Penguin Book of Poetry in the Twentieth Century (Penguin Viking, 1999), Haiku World: An International Poetry Almanac (Kodansha International, 1996), The Haiku Seasons (Kodansha International, 1996), The Backyards of Heaven: An Anthology of Contemporary Poetry (2003), Dancing With Kitty Stobling: The Patrick Kavanagh Award Winners 1971-2003 (Lilliput Press, 2004) and Our Shared Japan: An Anthology of Contemporary Irish Poetry (Dedalus, 2007).

He won the Patrick Kavanagh Poetry Award in 1986, the Poetry Business Book & Pamphlet Competition in 2005 and the Strokestown International Poetry Prize in 2009.

== Publications ==
=== Poetry books ===
- In The Bonsai Garden (Raven Arts Press, 1988)
- The Escape Artist (Smith/Doorstop Books, 2006)
- The Fever Wards (Salt Publishing, 2010)

=== Novels ===
- Oasis (Poolbeg Press 1982)

=== Non-fiction ===
- The Gilded Chalet (Nicholas Brealey, 2015)
