= Ireland and the International Monetary Fund =

Ireland has been a member of the International Monetary Fund (IMF) since 1957, and has contributed to and drawn funds from the fund on occasion, most notably in 2010, when it received an international loan package of 22.5 billion euros to fund programmes to restore the banking system to health, and reduce budget deficits.

== History ==
Ireland has had a long-standing relationship with the International Monetary Fund (IMF) since its entry into Fund membership on 8 August 1957. Ireland has both contributed to and used IMF resources, as well as participated in IMF decision-making, with, as of 2017, a 0.71% voting power. Within the IMF, Ireland has accepted the obligations of Article VIII, Sections 2, 3, and 4 of the Articles of Agreement.

== 2010 bailout ==
During 2010, the IMF had to use its economic bailout capacity to support Ireland and other European Union Member nations as a result of the economic fallout following the Great Recession. During the recession and the subsequent Post-2008 Irish banking crisis the economy went into an economic downfall which led to economic and political turmoil. EU states drew on international funding packages totaling 85 billion euros, of which Ireland received credit of 22.5 billion euros to fund programmes to restore the banking system back to health, and reduce budget deficits.

During the bailout period in 2010 the main focus for the IMF and the EU, and in turn the Government of Ireland, was to get banking systems mobilised properly and to restore the health of the public finance market. This process, which began in December 2010, involved a three-year lending arrangement which was meant to enhance the economy of Ireland and the EU. This was done in three stages, as defined by the IMF and EU. The first stage was to identify those banks that remained viable, and return them to health through reorganisation. The second stage was to recapitalise banks and encourage them to rely on deposit inflows and market-based funding. The third and last stage was to strengthen bank supervision and introduce a comprehensive bank resolution framework. At the time of the bailout the Irish government's National Recovery Plan aimed for savings worth 15 billion euros, roughly 9 percent of the nation's GDP, over the period 2011-14. Savings worth 6 billion euros were undertaken in 2011 alone.

=== Aftermath ===
After the bailout the Irish Government followed the IMF's recommendations in regards to investing in banking reform. On 27 July 2016, the Executive Board of the IMF analysed the progress of Ireland's economy in the Article IV consultation, the fifth post-programme monitoring discussion with Ireland since the bailout. The Article IV report stated that the rebound of the Irish economy was exceptional. Ireland's GDP grew by 7.8 percent in 2015 on the back of strong domestic demand and solid export growth. As of 2017 the economic prosperity in Ireland continued to grow. The Irish Times stated that the IMF expected Irish economy to grow by 3.5% in 2017. However amid the recent external economic risks from other nations activities, most notably Brexit, the March 2017 Article IV consultation has stated that while the medium-term outlook remains positive, that Ireland and the IMF should continue to prepare for any future economic hardships from external factors. As of 20 December 2017, Ireland is no longer in debt to the IMF.
