= Thomas McCarthy (poet) =

Irish poet, novelist, and critic (born 1954)

- Born: 1954 (age 71–72); Cappoquin, County Waterford, Ireland
- Education: University College Cork
- Occupations: Poet, novelist
- Writing career
- Notable works: The Sorrow Garden, Mr Dineen's Careful Parade, The Merchant Prince

Thomas McCarthy (born 1954) is an Irish poet, novelist, and critic, born in Cappoquin, County Waterford, Ireland. He attended University College Cork where he was part of a resurgence of literary activity under the inspiration of John Montague. Among McCarthy's contemporaries, described by Thomas Dillon Redshaw as "that remarkable generation", were the writers and poets Theo Dorgan, Sean Dunne, Greg Delanty, Maurice Riordan and William Wall. McCarthy edited, at various times, The Cork Review and Poetry Ireland Review. He has published seven collections of poetry with Anvil Press Poetry, London, including The Sorrow Garden, The Lost Province, Mr Dineen's Careful Parade, The Last Geraldine Officer, and Merchant Prince. The main themes of his poetry are Southern Irish politics, love and memory. He is also the author of two novels; Without Power and Asya and Christine. He is married with two children and lives in Cork City where he worked in the City Libraries until his retirement. He won the Patrick Kavanagh Poetry Award in 1977. His monograph "Rising from the Ashes" tells the story of the burning of the Carnegie Free Library in Cork City by the Black and Tans in 1920 and the subsequent efforts to rebuild the collection with the help of donors from all over the world.

== Works ==
=== Poetry ===
- 1978 in poetry: The First Convention, Dolmen Press, Dublin
- 1981 in poetry: The Sorrow Garden, Anvil Press, London
- 1984 in poetry: The Non-Aligned Storyteller, Anvil Press, London
- 1989 in poetry: Seven Winters in Paris, Anvil Press, London
- 1996 in poetry: The Lost Province, Anvil Press, London
- 1999 in poetry: Mr Dineen’s Careful Parade: New and Selected Poems, Anvil Press, London
- 2005 in poetry: Merchant Prince, Anvil Press, London
- 2009 in poetry: The Last Geraldine Officer, Anvil Press, London
- 2016 in poetry: Pandemonium, Carcanet Press, Manchester
- 2019 in poetry: Prophecy, Carcanet Press, Manchester

=== Fiction ===
- 1990 in literature: Without Power, Poolbeg Press, Dublin
- 1993 in literature: Asya and Christine, Poolbeg Press, Dublin

=== Nonfiction ===
- 2021: Poetry, Memory and the Party, Gallery Press, Dublin
- 1998: The Garden of Remembrances, New Island Books, Dublin

=== Other works ===
McCarthy is also a contributor to a series of podcasts made by Podcasts.ie (under the Arts Council of Ireland's Literature Project Awards) called The Writer's Passage in which 10 Irish authors take a personal tour through the locations of their books.

== Notes and references ==
- Ryan, Ray. Ireland and Scotland: Literature and Culture, State and Nation, 1966–2000. Oxford University Press, 2002.
