= Gerry Murphy (poet) =

Irish poet

- Born: 1952 (age 73–74); Cork City, Ireland
- Occupations: Poet, swimming instructor
- Writing career
- Notable works: Extracts From The Lost Log Book of Christopher Columbus (1999), End of Part One, New and Selected Poems (2006)

Gerry Murphy is an Irish poet.

== Life and work ==
Gerry Murphy was born in Cork City in 1952. His work is witty, openly intellectual and often satirical and is "highly, self-consciously literary". "Much of the most recent work displays intense absorption of the Roman classics either through direct reference or employment of the pithy epigram."

He attended University College Cork where he was part of a resurgence of literary activity under the inspiration of John Montague. Among his contemporaries, described by Thomas Dillon Redshaw as "that remarkable generation," there were Thomas McCarthy, William Wall, Theo Dorgan, Maurice Riordan, Greg Delanty and Sean Dunne. According to Montague in a brief foreword to the Selected volume (2006), “...what makes Murphy unique among his contemporaries... is his curious integrity, the way he has created an aesthetic out of nearly nothing, ex nihilo.”

After dropping out of university in the early 1970s Murphy spent some years working in London and a year living in an Israeli Kibbutz before returning to Cork in 1980 where he has remained ever since. A champion swimmer, he has made his living primarily as a life guard and swimming pool manager.

Pocket Apocalypse, his translations of the Polish poet Katarzyna Borun-Jagodzinska, appeared in 2005 from Southword Editions. End of Part One: New & Selected Poems features generous selections from all of those books together with some 30 new poems in a section entitled ‘The Psychopathology of Everyday Life’. Gerry's poetry has also come to life on the stage, with a stage adaptation by American playwright Roger Gregg at the Triskel Arts Centre, Cork.

Writing in The Irish Examiner about his 2010 book My Flirtation With International Socialism, poet Thomas McCarthy described him as "indisputably the doyen of the post-Galvin Cork generations, Murphy is a thrilling and provocative master of poetic monologue and social commentary. His habit is to be elliptical in politics, to insert a political jibe or universal truth as adroitly as an assassin’s knife". Fred Johnston, writing in Poetry Ireland Review, described Murphy's work as "catching the chink of light between the savagely political and the everyday".

Other poets cited as possible influences on Murphy's work include the American Charles Simic and the Romanian Marin Sorescu.

== Publications ==
=== Collections ===
- A Small Fat Boy Walking Backwards (Cork, Commons Press, 1988, Three Spires Press, 1992)
- Rio de la Plata and All That (Dublin, Dedalus, 1993)
- The Empty Quarter (Dedalus, 1995)
- Extracts from the Lost Log Book of Christopher Columbus (Dedalus, 1999)
- Torso of an Ex-Girlfriend (Dedalus, 2002)
- End of Part One, New and Selected Poems (Dedalus, 2006)
- My Flirtation With International Socialism (Dedalus, 2010)

=== Translation ===
- His translation of the Polish poet Katarzyna Borun-Jagodzinska was published as Pocket Apocalypse (Cork, Southword Editions, 2005). Intermediary translator was Karolina Barski.
