= William Wall (writer) =

Irish novelist, poet and short story writer

- Born: 6 July 1955 (age 71); Cork City, Ireland
- Education: University College Cork
- Occupations: Novelist, poet
- Writing career
- Notable works: This Is The Country, Alice Falling, No Paradiso, Mathematics & Other Poems
- Website: williamwall.net

William "Bill" Wall (born 6 July 1955) is an Irish novelist, poet and short story writer.

== Early life and education ==
Wall was born in Cork city in 1955, but he was raised in the coastal village of Whitegate. He received his secondary education at the Christian Brothers School in Midleton. He progressed to University College Cork where he graduated in Philosophy and English.

== Career ==
William Wall is the author of nine novels, six collections of poetry and three volumes of short stories. For many years he taught English at Presentation Brothers College, Cork, where he inspired Cillian Murphy to enter acting.

In 1997, Wall won the Patrick Kavanagh Poetry Award. He published his first collection of poetry in that year.

In 2005, This Is The Country appeared. A broad attack on politics in "Celtic Tiger" Ireland, as well as a rite of passage novel, it was longlisted for the Man Booker Prize, and shortlisted for the Irish Book Awards. It can be read as a satirical allegory on corruption, the link between capitalism and liberal democracy exemplified in the 'entrepreneurial' activities of minor drug dealers and gangsters, and reflected in the architecture of business parks and sink estates. This political writing takes the form of "an insightful and robust social conscience", in the words of academic John Kenny. Dr Kenny also focused on what he saw as Wall's "baneful take on the Irish family, his fundamentally anti-idyllic mood" which has "not entirely endeared Wall to the more misty-eyed among his readers at home or abroad". The political is also in evidence in his second collection of poetry Fahrenheit Says Nothing To Me. He is not a member of Aosdána, the Irish organisation for writers and artists. In 2006, his first collection of short fiction, No Paradiso, appeared. In 2017, he became the first European to win the Drue Heinz Literature Prize.

In 2022 he published his seventh novel. It appeared in Italian translation first as La Ballata Del Letto Vuoto, with the English original “Empty Bed Blues” published in 2023. He has described the Italian debut as 'an experiment that so far has gone well'. His next novel was also published first in Italian in May 2024 as “Ti ricordi Mattie Lantry?”. His ninth novel "L'Albero della Libertà" (The Tree of Liberty) appeared in 2025 but only in Italian.

His provocative political blog, The Ice Moon, featured harsh criticism of the Irish government as well as comments on international politics and reviews of mainly left-wing books and movies. He writes for literary journals such as Studi Irlandesi. His work has been translated into several languages and in Italy he won the Premio Lerici Angloliguria, the Premio Carlo Bo and the Premio Conza. He has presented his work at many literary festivals in Ireland and Italy.

He was one of the Irish delegates at the European Writers Conference in Istanbul in 2010.

== Critical response to his work ==
Described by writer Kate Atkinson as "lyrical and cruel and bold and with metaphors to die for", critics have focused on Wall's mastery of language, his gift for "linguistic compression", his "poet's gift for apposite, wry observation, dialogue and character", his "unflinching frankness" and his "laser-like ... dissection of human frailties", which is counterbalanced by "the depth of feeling that Wall invests in his work". A New Yorker review of his first novel declares "Wall, who is also a poet, writes prose so charged—at once lyrical and syncopated—that it's as if Cavafy had decided to write about a violent Irish household". In a recent review, his long poem "Job in Heathrow", anthologised in The Forward Book of Poetry 2010 but originally published in The SHOp, was described as "a chilling airport dystopia". Poet Fred Johnston suggests that Wall's poetry sets out to "list the shelves of disillusion under which a thinking man can be buried". "His apocalyptic vision of the ecological demise of our planet is suffused with humility and resignation where the global catastrophe is transformed "into a universal truth / the days are shorter / today than yesterday"", according to Borbála Faragó. For Philip Coleman "Ghost Estate is a deeply political book, but it also articulates a profound interest in and engagement with questions of aesthetics and poetics".

== Personal life ==
Wall is a longtime sufferer from Still's disease and described his efforts to circumvent the disabling effects of the disease using speech-to-text applications as "a battle between me and the software".

== Publications ==
=== Novels ===
- L'Albero della Libertà (Aboca, Sansepolcro – 2025) ISBN 97888552323446
- Ti ricordi Mattie Lantry? (Guanda, Milano – 2024) ISBN 978-88-235-3363-9
- Empty Bed Blues (New Island, Dublin – 2023) ISBN 978-1-84840-883-8
- La Ballata del Letto Vuoto (Nutrimenti, Rome – 2022) ISBN 978-88-6594-902-3
- Suzy Suzy (Head of Zeus, London – 2019, TBD) ISBN 978-1-78854-549-5
- Grace's Day (Head of Zeus, London – 2018, TBD) ISBN 978-1-78854-547-1
- This Is The Country (Sceptre, London – 2005, TBD) ISBN 978-0-340-82215-9
- The Map of Tenderness (Sceptre, London – 2002) ISBN 978-0-340-82214-2
- Minding Children (Sceptre, London – 2001) ISBN 978-0-340-75188-6
- Alice Falling (Sceptre, London, and WW Norton, New York – 2000) ISBN 978-0-340-75187-9

=== Poetry ===
- Smugglers In The Underground Hug Trade (Doire Press, Galway, Ireland – 2021) ISBN 978-1-907682-83-4
- The Yellow House (Salmon Poetry, Cliffs of Moher, Ireland – 2018) ISBN 978-1-910669-87-7
- Ghost Estate (Salmon Poetry, Cliffs of Moher, Ireland – 2011) ISBN 978-1-907056-70-3
- Fahrenheit Says Nothing To Me (Dedalus Press, Dublin, Ireland – 2004) ISBN 978-1-904556-21-3
- Mathematics And Other Poems (Collins Press, Cork, Ireland – 1997) ISBN 978-1-898256-26-7

=== Short stories collections ===
- No Paradiso (Brandon Books, Daingean, Ireland – 2006) ISBN 978-0-86322-355-6
- Hearing Voices / Seeing Thing (Doire Press, Inverin, Ireland – 2016) ISBN 978-1-907682-44-5
- The Islands (University of Pittsburgh Press, Pittsburgh, PA – 2017) ISBN 978-0-8229-4519-2
