= Theo Dorgan =

Irish poet, editor and librettist

- Born: 1953; Cork, Ireland
- Education: University College Cork
- Occupation: Poet
- Writing career
- Period: 1960s–present

Theo Dorgan is an Irish poet, writer and lecturer, translator, librettist and documentary screenwriter. He lives in Dublin.

== Life ==
Dorgan was born in Cork in 1953 being the eldest child in a family of eight boys and eight girls born to parents Bertie and Rose Dorgan (Nee Myers), and was educated in North Monastery School. He completed a BA in English and philosophy and a MA in English at University College Cork, after which he tutored and lectured at that university, while simultaneously being literature officer at the Triskel Arts Centre in Cork. He was visiting faculty at the University of Southern Maine.

He lives in Dublin with his wife, the poet and playwright Paula Meehan.

== Career ==
After Dorgan's first two poetry collections, The Ordinary House of Love and Rosa Mundi, went out of print, Dedalus Press reissued these two titles in a single volume What This Earth Cost Us. He has also published selected poems in Italian, La Case ai Margini del Mundo, (Faenza, Moby Dick, 1999).

He has edited The Great Book of Ireland (with Gene Lambert, 1991); Revising the Rising (with Máirín Ní Dhonnachadha, 1991); Irish Poetry Since Kavanagh (Dublin, Four Courts Press, 1996); Watching the River Flow (with Noel Duffy, Dublin, Poetry Ireland/Éigse Éireann, 1999); The Great Book of Gaelic (with Malcolm Maclean, Edinburgh, Canongate, 2002); and The Book of Uncommon Prayer (Dublin, Penguin Ireland, 2007).

He has been the series editor of the European Poetry Translation Network publications and director of the collective translation seminars from which the books arose.

A former director of Poetry Ireland (Irish: Éigse Éireann), Dorgan has worked as a broadcaster of literary programmes on both radio and television. He was the presenter of Poetry Now on RTÉ Radio 1, and later for RTÉ Television's books programme, Imprint. He was the scriptwriter for the television documentary series Hidden Treasures. His Jason and the Argonauts, set to music by Howard Goodall, was commissioned by and premiered at the Royal Albert Hall in London in 2004. A series of text pieces by Dorgan feature in the dance musical Riverdance; he was specially commissioned to create them for the theatrical show. His songs have been recorded by a number of musicians, including Alan Stivell, Jimmy Crowley and Cormac Breathnach.

== Awards and recognition ==
Dorgan was awarded the Listowel Prize for Poetry in 1992 and the O'Shaughnessy Prize for Irish Poetry in 2010. A member of Aosdána, he was appointed as a member of the Arts Council (An Chomhairle Ealaíon) from 2003 to 2008. He also served on the board of Cork European Capital of Culture 2005.

He was awarded the 2015 Poetry Now Award for Nine Bright Shiners.

== Works ==
=== Poetry ===
- The ordinary house of love, Salmon Pub., 1990, ISBN 9780948339509
- Rosa Mundi, Salmon poetry, 1995, ISBN 9781897648643
- La casa ai margini del mondo., Translated by M. Giosa, Mobydick, 1998, ISBN 9788881780761
- Sappho's Daughter, Wave Train Press, 1998, ISBN 9780953192304
- La Hija de Safo, Translated by Francisco Castaño, Hiperión Ediciones, 2001, ISBN 9788475176970
- What This Earth Cost Us, Dedalus Press, 2008, ISBN 9781904556947
- Greek, Dedalus Press, 2010, ISBN 9781906614171
- Making Way, New Island Books, 2013, ISBN 9781848402249
- Nine Bright Shiners, Dedalus Press, 2014, ISBN 9781906614980
- Orpheus, Dedalus Press, 2018, ISBN 9781910251300
- Bailéid Giofógacha, Coiscéim, 2019

=== Non-fiction ===
- Sailing for home: a voyage from Antigua to Kinsale, Penguin Ireland, 2004; Penguin Ireland, 2005, ISBN 9781844880492; Dedalus Press, 2010, ISBN 9781906614331
- Time on the Ocean: A Voyage From Cape Horn to Cape Town, New Island Books, 2010, ISBN 9781848400757

Editor

- A Book of Uncommon Prayer. Penguin Books Limited. 5 June 2008. ISBN 978-0-14-191726-9.
- Preghiere non-comuni, Armenia (1 January 2009) ISBN 978-8834422380

=== Translations ===
- Songs of earth and light, Barbara Korun, Southword Editions, 2005, ISBN 9781905002061

== Sources ==
- William Stewart, Steven Barfield, British and Irish poets: a biographical dictionary, 449–2006, McFarland, 2007, ISBN 9780786428915
