= Maurice Riordan =

Irish poet, translator, and editor (born 1953)

- Born: 1953 (age 72–73); Lisgoold, County Cork, Ireland
- Education: University College Cork
- Occupation: Poet
- Writing career
- Notable works: T. S. Eliot Prize; Floods (2000)

Maurice Riordan (born 1953) is an Irish poet, translator, and editor.

Born in Lisgoold, County Cork, his poetry collections include: A Word from the Loki (1995), a largely London-based collection which was a Poetry Book Society Choice and shortlisted for the T. S. Eliot Prize; Floods (2000) which was shortlisted for the Whitbread Poetry Award; The Holy Land (2007) which contains a sequence of Idylls or prose poems. It received the Michael Hartnett Award.

Riordan was educated in St. Colman's College, Fermoy, University College Cork and McMaster University, Ontario, Canada. In 2004 he was selected as one of the Poetry Society's 'Next Generation' poets. He was Poetry Editor of Poetry London from 2005 to 2009 and Editor of The Poetry Review from 2013 to 2017.

Riordan has worked as an anthology editor and literary translator in addition to writing. His collection for children The Moon Has Written You a Poem is adapted from the Portuguese of José Jorge Letria. He has taught at Goldsmiths College and at Imperial College and is emeritus Professor of Poetry at Sheffield Hallam University. He lives in London.

== Publications ==
=== Poetry collections ===
- A Word from the Loki, Faber 1995
- Floods, Faber 2000
- The Holy Land, Faber 2007
- The Water Stealer, Faber 2013
- Shoulder Tap, Faber 2021
- Selected Poems, Faber 2025

=== For children ===
- The Moon Has Written You a Poem, Winged Chariot 2005

=== As editor ===
- A Quark for Mister Mark (with Jon Turney), Faber 2000
- Wild Reckoning (with John Burnside), Calouste Gulbenkian Foundation 2004
- The Best of Irish Poetry (with Colm Breathnach), Southword 2006
- Dark Matter: Poems of Space (with Jocelyn Bell Burnell), Calouste Gulbenkian Foundation 2008
- Hart Crane: Selected Poems, Faber 'Poet to Poet' 2008
- The Finest Music: Early Irish Lyrics in Translation, Faber 2014

=== Translations ===
- Confidential Reports (Immanuel Mifsud), Southword 2005
- The Play of Waves (Immanuel Mifsud), Arc 2017
