= Leland Bardwell =

Irish poet, novelist and playwright (1922–2016)

- Born: Constance Olive Leland Hone; 25 February 1922; India
- Died: 28 June 2016 (aged 94); Sligo, Ireland
- Education: University of London
- Occupations: Novelist, poet, playwright
- Writing career
- Notable works: A Restless Life, Girl on a Bicycle

Constance Olive Leland Bardwell (25 February 1922 – 28 June 2016) was an Irish poet, novelist, and playwright. She was part of the literary scene in London and later Dublin, where she was an editor of literary magazines Hibernia and Cyphers. She published five volumes of poetry, novels, plays and short stories, for which she received the Marten Toonder Award and the Dede Korkut Short Story Award from Turkish PEN. In later life, she moved to Sligo, where she co-founded the Scríobh Literary Festival. Her memoir A Restless Life details her difficult upbringing and her experiences in London and Dublin.

== Early life ==
Bardwell was born Constance Olive Leland Hone in India to Irish parents William Hone and Mary Collis, and moved to Ireland at the age of two. Her father's family were of the Anglo-Irish Hone family. Bardwell had a difficult childhood growing up in Leixlip, County Kildare. She was educated at Alexandra College and briefly studied in Switzerland. She worked in a variety of jobs in Ireland and later Scotland, where, in 1948, she met poet Michael Bardwell. The couple had two children and later separated.

== Literary career ==
Bardwell became a part of the literary scene of Soho in London, where she socialised with fellow writers, including Anthony Cronin, Francis Bacon, Patrick Kavanagh and Anthony Burgess. In the 1950s, she met Fintan McLachlan, with whom she had three children, including the composer John McLachlan. The family moved back to Dublin, where Bardwell worked as a reviewer for Hibernia magazine and as a poetry editor.

From 1970 onward, Bardwell's work was published regularly, starting with her first volume of poetry, The Mad Cyclist, which was later followed by her first novel, Girl on a Bicycle. Bardwell wrote a number of plays and short stories, such as Outpatients, and her works were produced for RTÉ and the BBC. In 1984, Bardwell wrote a musical play, No Regrets, based on the life of Édith Piaf. It opened at the Gaiety Theatre starring Anne Bushnell, and later toured across Ireland.

Bardwell's work was heavily influenced by her difficult upbringing and her experiences in London and Dublin. In her memoir, A Restless Life, she described her life as "a crescendo of madness". She is considered an important poet by her contemporaries, who included Patrick Kavanagh, John Jordan, Paul Durcan, Macdara Woods, Michael Hartnett and the poet Hugh McFadden. On the publication of Bardwell's fourth collection of poetry, The White Beach, Eiléan Ní Chuilleanáin stated "it is good to see her work of the decades collected – it has inspired many Irish poets, male and female, and should be much more widely known", adding that her work was "witty, full of sharp intimate honesty, full of truth and surprises."

In 1975, Bardwell co-founded the long-running literary magazine Cyphers with Pearse Hutchinson Eiléan Ní Chuilleanáin and Macdara Woods, and acted as a co-editor until 2012. She was the recipient of the Marten Toonder Award in 1993, and the Dede Korkut Short Story Award from Turkish PEN in 2010.

In later life, Bardwell moved to Annaghmakerrig in County Monaghan and later to Cloonagh in Sligo, where in 1993 she co-founded the Scríobh Literary Festival. Bardwell was a member of the Irish artists' association Aosdána and acted as one of Patrick Kavanagh's literary executors.

2022 saw her centenary year marked by an arts festival in the Model, Sligo. It was entitled A Single Rose, reflecting her wide interests in the arts, it included film, music, visual art as well as contributions from writers of prose, poetry and memoir. 2022 also saw the publication of posthumous work from Bardwell, in the form of previously unpublished prose and poetry: from Doire Press a novella and eight new stories titled The Heart and the Arrow, and from Salmon Press the Collected Poems which brought together her collections alongside material from early magazines and later work not previously published. Lepus Print also published a commemorative book: My Name Suspended in the Air, with contributions from 33 women artists of all types.

== Published works ==
Poetry

- The Mad Cyclist [New Writers' Press, 1970]
- The Fly and the Bed Bug [Beaver Row Press, 1984]
- Dostoevsky's Grave: Selected Poems [Dedalus Press, 1991]
- The White Beach: New and Selected Poems, 1960-1998 [Salmon Publishing, 1998]
- The Noise of Masonry Settling[Dedalus Press, 2006]
- Them's Your Mammy's Pills [Dedalus Press, 2015]
- My Name Suspended in the Air [Lepus Print, 2022]
- Collected Poems [Salmon Poetry, 2022]

Novels

- Girl on a Bicycle [Irish Writers Co-operative, 1977]
- That London Winter [Co-op Books, 1981]
- The House [Brandon, 1984]
- There We Have Been [Attic Press, 1989]
- Mother to a Stranger [Blackstaff Press, 2002]

Short story collections

- Different Kinds of Love [Attic Press, 1987]
- The Heart and the Arrow [Doire Press, 2022]

Memoir

- A Restless Life [Liberties Press, 2008]

Plays

- Thursday [Trinity College, Dublin, 1974]
- Open Ended Prescription [ Peacock Theatre, Dublin,1979]
- The Edith Piaf Story [National Stadium, Dublin, 1984]
- Jocasta [Dhá Ean Theatre company, Sligo 2001]

Contributions

Ms. Muffet and Others: A Funny, Sassy, Heretical Collection of Feminist Fairytales. Dublin, Attic Press, 1986.
