= Gili =

Gili may refer to:

== People ==
Given name

- Gili Bar-Hillel, Israeli translator
- Gili Cohen, Israeli Olympic judoka
- Gili Haimovitz (born 1993), Israeli taekwando fighter
- Gili Landau (born 1958), Israeli footballer and manager
- Gili Mossinson, Israeli basketball player
- Gili Raanan, Israeli businessman
- Gili Sharir (born 1999), Israeli Olympic bronze medalist judoka

Surname

- Baldomer Gili i Roig, Spanish painter, draftsman and photographer
- Gemma Gili, Spanish footballer
- Gérard Gili, French football manager and player
- Ignacio Gili, Argentine cyclist
- Jaime Gili, artist
- Joan Gili, antiquarian book-seller, publisher and translator
- Jonathan Gili, British filmmaker, editor and director
- Katherine Gili, British sculptor
- Phillida Gili, British children's book illustrator
- Rosa Gili Casals, Andorran academic and politician

== Other ==
- Gili, Iran
- Gili Islands, an archipelago of three small islands off the northwest coast of Lombok, Indonesia.

== See also ==
- Gili Gili, Papua New Guinea
- Gillyweed, in Harry Potter's stories.
