= Peter Fallon (poet) =

Irish poet, editor and publisher

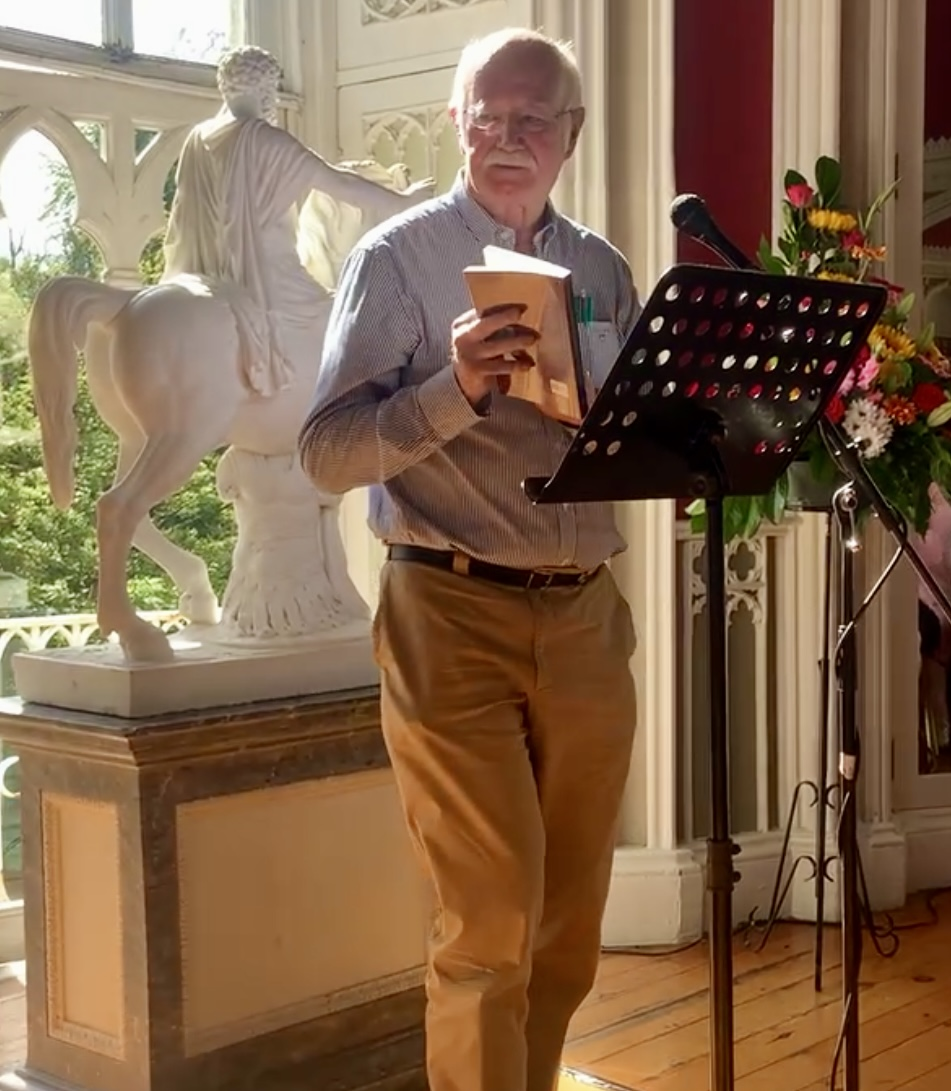
- Fallon at Slane Castle in 2022
- Born: 1951 (age 74–75); West Germany
- Occupations: Poet; editor; publisher; professor
- Years active: 20th and 21st centuries
- Known for: Gallery Press
- Spouse: Jean Barry (m. 1986)
- Children: 3
- Relatives: BP Fallon (brother)
- Awards: Honorary doctorate (Villanova University); membership of Aosdána

Academic background
- Education: St Gerard's School, Bray; Glenstal Abbey School
- Alma mater: Trinity College Dublin

Academic work
- Discipline: Literature
- Sub-discipline: Irish poetry; Irish drama
- Institutions: Trinity College Dublin; Deerfield Academy; Villanova University; Boston College
- Website: Official website

Peter Fallon (born 1951) is an Irish poet, editor and publisher. As of 2023, he has edited and published 500 books of poetry and drama, and ten volumes of his own work have been released since 1971. He was elected a member of Aosdána, Ireland's arts academy, by his peers, and has been a professor at multiple universities, as well as a writer-in-residence and the presenter on multiple literary tours. Fallon is the subject of a 2014 festschrift, which included 17 poems in his honour, including one by Seamus Heaney.

== Early life and family ==
Born in West Germany to Irish parents in 1951, while his father was serving with the British Army, Peter Fallon was brought to Ireland in 1957, at the age of 6, and largely grew up on a farm at Lennoxbrook, near Kells, County Meath. He has one brother, and had one sister. At the age of 9 he was sent to St Gerard's School in Bray, for three years, and then for a period, he attended the Benedictine-run Glenstal Abbey School, which is where he first tried writing poetry.

== Dublin: Poetry, publishing and college ==
Fallon left school at 16, moved to Dublin, with a family home in Churchtown, and took a pre-university course in Science, with thoughts of becoming a veterinary surgeon. He later started to study English Literature at Trinity College.

=== Editorial and publishing career ===
With Eamon Carr, he started, about 1968, a Beat Generation poetry performance group, Tara Telephone, which also developed a publishing arm, Tara Telephone Publications. The group toured as a musical trio, and then expanded. Publications included a literary journal or magazine, Capella, and a broadsheet, The Book of Invasions, both with Jim Fitzpatrick as the lead illustrator; Capella published both works by local poets and contributions from Allen Ginsberg, Adrian Henri, John Lennon and David Bowie. Members of Tara Telephone went on to become co-founders of influential Celtic rock group, Horslips. Fallon himself was an active member of the Dublin Poets' Union.

Fallon has been the editor and publisher of Gallery Press from the beginning, first from suburban Dublin, and latterly of Loughcrew near Oldcastle, County Meath. The press, founded in 1970 when he was 18, is one of Ireland's leading publishers of poetry; it had published 100 books by 1985. For its 25th anniversary, an event was held at the Abbey Theatre, opened by President of Ireland Mary Robinson, with Christy Moore as a special guest and with readings introduced by Seamus Heaney, while its 40th anniversary was marked by multiple events and a one-hour TV show on RTE. In all, Fallon has edited, as of 2023, 500 books of poetry and plays.

Fallon co-founded the Deerfield Press and has also been the fiction editor at O'Brien Press, and co-edited an anthology of children's stories, "The Lucky Bag".

=== Education and own poetry ===
Fallon attended Trinity College, graduating with an honours degree in 1975.

He has had ten collections of his own poetry published over more than 50 years, beginning in 1971, and between 1976 and 1985, performed ten tours in the US. Influences on Fallon's work include a leading Irish poet of the mid-20th century, Patrick Kavanagh, the agrarian poet Wendell Berry and the American poet Robert Frost, and he produced a version of Kavanagh's Tarry Flynn. His work often touches on matters of nature, farming and the sense of place.

== Meath ==
Fallon started to stay in a cottage in the garden area of the Loughcrew estate in northern County Meath in 1975, and bought it and some acres of land in 1984, later living there with his wife and children. He farms actively. He married Jean Barry, who was one of his small team at Gallery Press, in 1986; they have two living children. Fallon has spoken publicly, and written in a fund-raising volume for a sudden-infant death charity, about the death of a third child in infancy.

== Academic postings ==
He was an adjunct professor at Trinity College Dublin, the Heimbold Professor at Villanova University, and the Burns Professor at Boston College. He was poet-in-residence at the Deerfield Academy in Massachusetts twice, including for its bicentennial year, from 1996 to 1997, and "international writer-in-residence" for Indiana Schools in 1976.

== Reception and recognition ==
His work as an editor has been described as making him "an arbiter of taste as well as a lead archaeologist of the layered communities in Irish poetry" while his translation of the Georgics by Virgil has been described as a "work of genius, a work that places Fallon in a great Trinity College classical studies tradition".

Fallon was elected by his peers to membership of Aosdána, the Irish affiliation or academy of creative artists. He was also awarded an honorary doctorate by Villanova University, and an Alumni Award by Trinity College Dublin, and won a prize in the UK National Poetry Competition in 1982, the Meath Merit Award (Arts and Culture) in 1987, and the O'Shaughnessy Poetry Award in 1993.

He was the subject of a Festschrift, Peter Fallon: Poet, Publisher, Editor and Translator, in 2014. The volume includes 17 poems written in his honour, including work by Seamus Heaney. His article was featured on the main page of the English-language Wikipedia in July 2023.

== Works ==
=== Own poetry ===
- Among the Walls (1971)
- Coincidence of Flesh (1972)
- The First Affair (1974)
- The Speaking Stones (1978)
- Winter Work (1983, Gallery Press)
- The News and Weather (1987, Gallery Press)
- Eye to Eye (1993, Gallery Press)
- News of the World: Selected and New Poems (1998, Gallery Press)
- The Company of Horses (2007, Gallery Press)
- Strong, My Love (2014, Gallery Press)

=== Translations ===
- The Georgics of Virgil (2004, Gallery Press), later republished in the Oxford World Classics series

=== As editor ===
- Sense of Ireland (Anthology)
- The Penguin Book of Contemporary Irish Poetry (Anthology, 1990)
- Captivating Brightness (Anthology, co-edited with Des Lally and John Fanning)
- Loughcrew : The Cairns : A Guide To An Ancient Irish Landscape (Jean McMann, After Hours Books, 1994)

In addition, he has edited and published more than 500 volumes of poetry and plays.
