= Tom French (poet) =

Irish poet

- Born: 1966 (age 59–60); Kilkenny, Ireland
- Education: NUI Galway; University of Limerick
- Writing career
- Genre: Poetry

Tom French (born 1966 in Kilkenny) is an Irish poet.

== Life ==
He was born in Kilkenny in 1966 and raised across the border in Tipperary. He graduated from National University of Ireland, Galway and the University of Limerick.

He lives with his family close to the coast of County Meath, where he earns his living in the County library service.

He received bursaries in literature from An Chomhairle Ealaíon/The Arts Council, Ireland in 1999 and 2009. His work has appeared in numerous national and international publications.

== Awards ==
- Ted McNulty prize
- 2002 Forward Poetry Prize Best First Collection
- 2015 The Dermot Healy International Poetry Prize
- 2016 Lawrence O’Shaughnessy Award for Poetry
- 2023 Pigott Prize, Listowel Writers' Week

== Works ==
- Touching the Bones. Gallery Press. 2001.
- The Fire Step. Gallery Press. 2009.
- The Night Ahead. Smithereens Press. 2013.
- Midnightstown. Gallery Press. 2014.
- Taking the Oath. Smithereens Press. 2015.
- The Way to Work. Gallery Press. 2016.
- The Sea Field. Gallery Press. 2020.
- Company. Gallery Press. 2022.
