= Vona Groarke =

Irish poet

Vona Groarke is an Irish poet. In September 2025 she became Ireland Professor of Poetry.

== Biography ==
Groarke has published fifteen books, including nine collections of poetry with the Gallery Press: Shale (1994), Other People's Houses (1999), Flight (2002), Juniper Street (2006), Spindrift (2009), X (2014), Double Negative (2019), Link : Poet and World (2021), and Infinity Pool (2025).

Groarke's translation of the eighteenth-century Irish poem Caoineadh Airt Uí Laoghaire, titled Lament for Art O'Leary, was published by Gallery Books in 2008. She has also written Woman of Winter (2023), a version of the ninth-century Irish poem usually known as 'The Lament of the Hag of Beare', with illustrations by Isabel Nolan.

In 2016 Groarke published two books: Selected Poems, which won the Piggott Prize for Best Irish Poetry Collection, and Four Sides Full, a book-length essay on art frames and much else.

In 2022, New York University Press published Groarke's Hereafter: The Telling Life of Ellen O'Hara, an innovative, mixed-genre account of Irish woman immigrants in late nineteenth-century New York, and their lives and work as domestic servants. Using poetry, prose, history and images to tell its story, Hereafter arose out of Groarke's time as a Fellow of the Cullman Center at the New York Public Library, 2018–19.

Groarke is a former editor of Poetry Ireland Review (issues 113–120, with best-selling special issues on Seamus Heaney, W.B. Yeats and the Rising Generation of Irish poets). She has also been a selector for the Poetry Book Society in the UK; a judge of the Forward Prizes for Poetry, the Pollard Prize and the International Dublin Literary Award; and a poetry reviewer for The Irish Times. Her recent essays on poets and poetry have appeared in the Los Angeles Review of Books, The Poetry Review, P. N. Review, and Poetry Ireland Review.

Groarke has been a co-holder of the Heimbold Chair of Irish Studies at Villanova University and has taught at Wake Forest University in North Carolina. She has taught at the Centre for New Writing at the University of Manchester since 2007.

In 2010, Groarke was elected a member of Aosdána, the Irish academy of the arts. She is the current Poet in Residence with the Yeats Society in Sligo, and Writer in Residence at St John's College, Cambridge. In 2025 she was appointed Ireland Professor of Poetry from September 2025 to November 2028.

== Awards and honours ==
Groarke's work has been recognized with awards including the Brendan Behan Memorial Award, the Hennessy Award, the Michael Hartnett Award, and the Strokestown International Poetry Award.

Her volumes Spindrift, X and Double Negative have all been nominated for the Irish Times Poetry Now Award. Hereafter: The Telling Life of Ellen O'Hara was shortlisted for the Irish Independent / Yeats Society Poetry Prize 2023. Infinity Pool was shortlisted for the 2025 T. S. Eliot Prize.

Groarke was elected a Fellow of the Royal Society of Literature in 2024.

== Books ==
- Shale. Gallery Press. 1995. ISBN 9781852351311.
- Other People's Houses. Gallery Press. 1999. ISBN 9781852352417.
- The Deserted Village. Gallery Press. 2002. ISBN 9781852353360. (Introduction to Oliver Goldsmith poem, with drawings by Blaise Drummond)
- Flight. Gallery Press. 2004. ISBN 9781852353087.
- Flight and Earlier Poems. Wake Forest University Press. 2004. ISBN 9781930630123.
- Juniper Street. Gallery Press. 2006. ISBN 9781930630284.
- Lament for Art O'Leary. Gallery Press. 2008. ISBN 9781852354459.
- Spindrift. Gallery Press. 2009. ISBN 9781852354763.
- X. Gallery Press. 2014. ISBN 9781852355760.
- Selected Poems. Gallery Press. 2016. ISBN 9781852356675.
- Four Sides Full. Gallery Press. 2016. ISBN 9781852356842.
- Double Negative. Gallery Press. 2019. ISBN 9781911337607.
- Link : Poet and World. Gallery Press. 2021. ISBN 9781911338222.
- Hereafter: The Telling Life of Ellen O'Hara. NYU Press. 2021. ISBN 9781479835324.
- Woman of Winter. Gallery Press. 2023. ISBN 9781911338611.
- Infinity Pool. Gallery Press. 2025. ISBN 9781917371094.
