= Derek Mahon =

Irish poet (1941–2020)

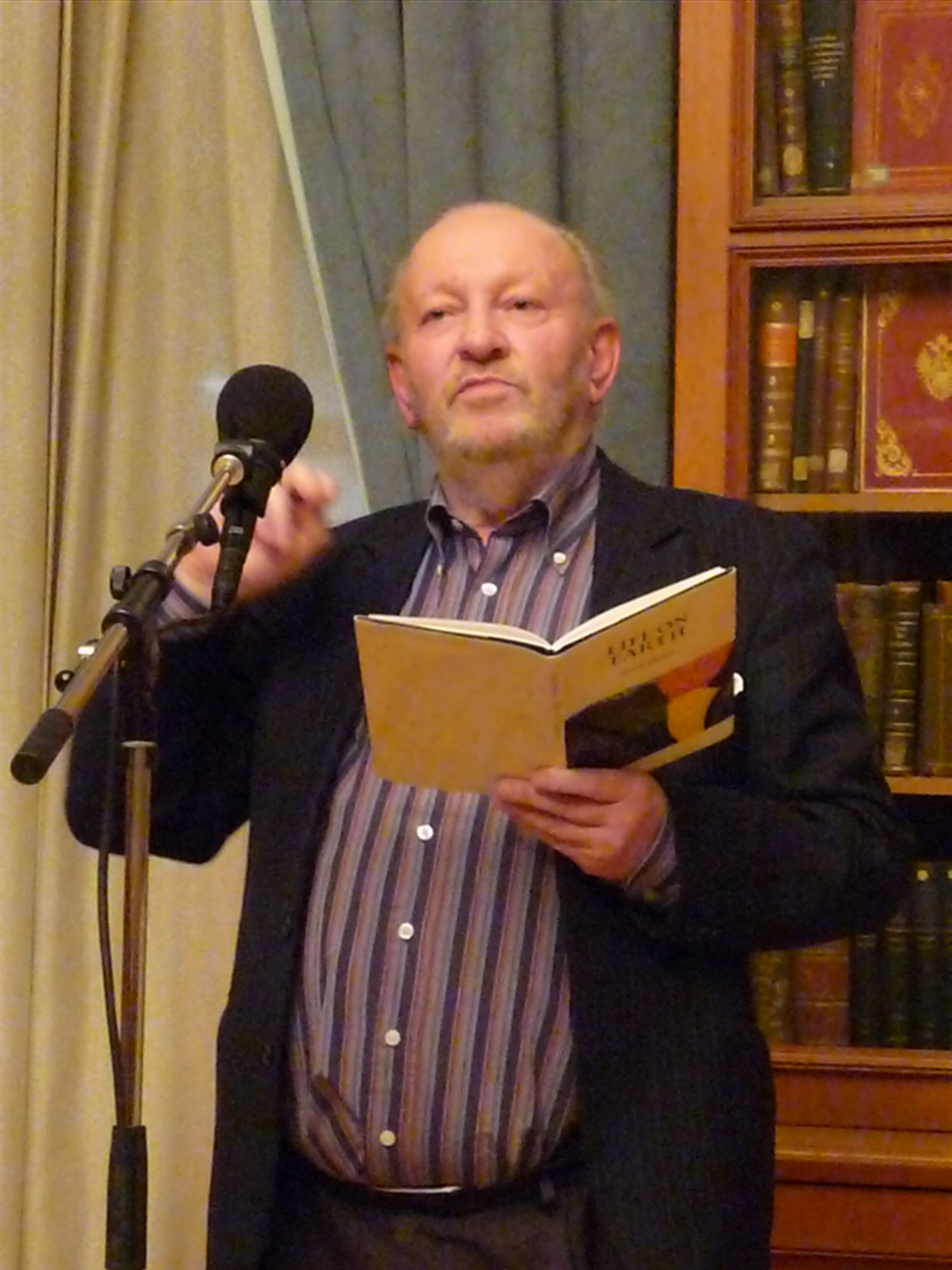
- Mahon in 2010
- Born: 23 November 1941; Belfast, Northern Ireland
- Died: 1 October 2020 (aged 78); Cork, Ireland
- Occupations: Poet; Journalist
- Writing career
- Genre: Poetry
- Movement: Modernism

Norman Derek Mahon (23 November 1941 – 1 October 2020) was an Irish poet. He was born in Belfast, Northern Ireland, but lived in a number of cities around the world. At his death it was noted that his "influence in the Irish poetry community, literary world and society at large, and his legacy, is immense". President of Ireland Michael D. Higgins said of Mahon, "he shared with his northern peers the capacity to link the classical and the contemporary but he brought also an edge that was unsparing of cruelty and wickedness."

== Biography ==
Derek Mahon was born on 23 November 1941 as the only child of Ulster Protestant working-class parents. His father and grandfather worked at Harland and Wolff while his mother worked at a local flax mill. During his childhood, he claims he was something of a solitary dreamer, comfortable with his own company yet aware of the world around him. Interested in literature from an early age, he attended Skegoneill Primary School and then the Royal Belfast Academical Institution, or "Inst".

At Inst he encountered fellow students who shared his interest in literature and poetry. The school produced a magazine in which Mahon published some of his early poems. According to the critic Hugh Haughton his early poems were highly fluent and extraordinary for a person so young. His parents could not see the point of poetry, but he set out to prove them wrong after he won his school's Forrest Reid Memorial Prize for the poem 'The power that gives the water breath'.

Mahon pursued third level studies at Trinity College Dublin in French, English, and Philosophy and where he edited Icarus, and formed many friendships with writers such as Michael Longley, Eavan Boland and Brendan Kennelly. He started to mature as a poet. He left Trinity in 1965 to take up studies at the Sorbonne in Paris.

After leaving the Sorbonne in 1966 he worked his way through Canada and the United States. In 1968, while spending a year teaching English at Belfast High School, he published Night Crossing, his first collection of poems. He later taught in a school in Dublin and worked in London as a freelance journalist. He lived in Kinsale, County Cork. On 23 March 2007, he was awarded the David Cohen Prize for Literature. He won the Poetry Now Award in 2006 for his collection, Harbour Lights, and again in 2009 for his Life on Earth collection.

At times expressing anti-establishment values, Mahon has described himself as, an 'aesthete' with a penchant 'for left-wingery [...] to which, perhaps naively, I adhere.'

His papers are held at Emory University.

In March 2020, at the beginning of the COVID-19 pandemic, RTÉ News ended its evening broadcast with Mahon reading his poem Everything Is Going to Be All Right.

On 1 October 2020, Mahon died in Cork after a short illness, aged 78.

He is survived by his partner Sarah Iremonger and his three children, Rory, Katy, and Maisie.

Mahon features on the Irish Leaving Certificate course with ten of his poems (Grandfather, Day Trip to Donegal, Ecclesiastes, After the Titanic, As It Should Be, A Disused Shed in Co. Wexford, Rathlin, The Chinese Restaurant in Portrush, Kinsale and Antarctica).

== Style ==
Thoroughly educated and with a keen understanding of literary tradition, Mahon came out of the tumult of Northern Ireland with a formal, moderate, even restrained poetic voice. In an era of free verse, Mahon often wrote in received forms, using a broadly applied version of iambic pentameter that, metrically, resembles the "sprung foot" verse of Gerard Manley Hopkins. Some poems rhyme. Even the Irish landscape itself is never all that far from the classical tradition, as in his poem "Achill":

Croagh Patrick towers like Naxos over the water

And I think of my daughter at work on her difficult art

And wish she were with me now between thrush and plover,

Wild thyme and sea-thrift, to lift the weight from my heart.

He has also explored the genre of ekphrasis: the poetic reinterpretation of visual art. In that respect, he was interested in 17th-century Dutch and Flemish art.

== Publications ==
=== Poetry: Main Collections ===
- 1968: Night-Crossing, Oxford University Press
- 1972: Lives, Oxford University Press
- 1975: The Snow Party, Oxford University Press
- 1982: The Hunt By Night, Oxford University Press
- 1995: The Hudson Letter, Gallery Press; Wake Forest University Press, 1996
- 1997: The Yellow Book, Gallery Press; Wake Forest University Press, 1998
- 2005: Harbour Lights, Gallery Press (winner of the 2006 Irish Times Poetry Now Award)
- 2008: Life on Earth, Gallery Press (winner of the 2009 Irish Times Poetry Now Award)
- 2010: An Autumn Wind., Gallery Press
- 2018: Against the Clock, Gallery Press
- 2020: Washing Up, Gallery Press

=== Limited Editions and Booklets (Poetry) ===
- 1965: Twelve Poems, Festival Publications, Belfast
- 1970: Ecclesiastes, Phoenix Pamphlet Poets
- 1970: Beyond Howth Head, Dolmen Press
- 1977: In Their Element, Arts Council of Northern Ireland
- 1979: The Sea in Winter, Gallery Press
- 1981: Courtyards in Delft, Gallery Press
- 1984: A Kensington Notebook, Anvil Press
- 1985: Antarctica, Gallery Press
- 1992: The Yaddo Letter, Gallery Press
- 1999: Roman Script, Gallery Press
- 2001: Resistance Days, Gallery Press
- 2007: Somewhere the Wave, Gallery Press

==== Translations / Versions / Editions ====
- 1982: The Chimeras (a version of Les Chimères, by Nerval), Gallery Press
- 1985: High Time (a version of Molière's A School for Husbands), Gallery Press
- 1986: The School for Wives (after Molière), Gallery Press
- 1988: The Selected Poems of Philippe Jaccottet, Viking Press
- 1996: The Bacchae of Euripides, and Racine's Phaedra, Gallery Press
- 1998: Words in the Air Gallery Press
- 2001: The Seaside Cemetery (a version of 'Le Cimetiere marin' by Paul Valery, Gallery Press
- 2002: Birds (a version of Oiseaux, by Saint-John Perse), Gallery Press
- 2004: Cyrano de Bergerac. (A version of the play by Edmond Rostand), Gallery Press
- 2005: Oedipus (A conflation of Sophocles' Oedipus Rex and Oedipus at Colonus), Gallery Press
- 2006: Adaptations (A collection of versions, rather than translations proper, from poets such as Pasolini, Juvenal, Bertolt Brecht, Paul Valéry, Baudelaire, Rilke and Nuala Ní Dhomhnaill), Gallery Press
- 2011: Raw Material, Gallery Press
- 2013: Theatre, Gallery Press
- 2013: Echo's Grove: Collected Translations, Gallery Press
- 2023: The Adaptations (1975-2020), Gallery Press

=== Poetry: Selected Editions ===
- 1979: Poems 1962–1978, Oxford University Press
- 1991: Selected Poems, Viking Books/ Gallery Press; Paperback: Penguin (1993)
- 1999: Collected Poems, Gallery Press
- 2011: New Collected Poems, Gallery Press
- 2016: New Selected Poems, Faber & Faber; Gallery Press
- 2021: The Poems (1961-2020), Gallery Press

=== Prose ===
- 1996: Journalism: Selected Prose, 1970-1995 Ed. Terence Brown, Gallery Press
- 2012: Selected Prose, Gallery Press
- 2017: The Rain Bridge (for children), Gallery Press
- 2017: Olympia and the Internet, Gallery Press
- 2023: The Prose (1971-2020), Gallery Press

=== As Editor ===
- 2001: Jonathan Swift - Poems selected by Derek Mahon, Faber and Faber

=== Critical studies and reviews of Mahon's work ===
- Enniss, Stephen (2014) After the Titanic: A Life of Derek Mahon, Gill & Macmillan
- Haughton, Hugh (2007) The Poetry of Derek Mahon, Oxford University Press
- Jarniewicz, Jerzy (2013) Ekphrasis in the Poetry of Derek Mahon, NWP Piotrkow, ISBN 978-83-7726-056-2
- Cooke, Belinda (June–July 2014). "Nasty, brutish and short". The London Magazine: 99–104. Review of Echo's grove.
- Autumn Skies: Writers on Poems by Derek Mahon, Gallery Press

== Honours ==
- 1965 – Eric Gregory Award for poetry
- 1989 – Scott Moncrieff Translation Prize
- 1990 – Lannan Literary Awards for Poetry
- 1992 – The Irish Times-Aer Lingus Poetry Prize
- 1995 – Honorary doctorate Trinity College Dublin.
- 2001 – Honorary doctorate NUI Galway – for work reflecting the enduring aesthetic of achievement in contemporary Irish writing.
- 2007 – David Cohen Prize for Literature – in recognition of his 'lifetime's achievement'
- Member, Aosdána
- Irish Academy of Letters Award
- Guggenheim Fellowship
- 2020 – Irish Times Poetry Now award

== See also ==
- List of Northern Irish writers
