= Cyphers (magazine) =

Irish literary magazine

- Editors-in-chief: Eiléan Ní Chuilleanáin, Macdara Woods
- Categories: Poetry
- Founder: Leland Bardwell, Pearse Hutchinson, Eiléan Ní Chuilleanáin, Macdara Woods
- Founded: 1975
- First issue: 1975; 51 years ago
- Final issue Number: 2025; Issue 100 (2025)
- Country: Ireland
- Language: English
- Website: cyphers.ie

Cyphers was a literary magazine publishing poetry and criticism from Ireland and abroad. It was established in 1975 by Leland Bardwell, Pearse Hutchinson, Eiléan Ní Chuilleanáin, and Macdara Woods. Of the four, all but Ní Chuilleanáin are deceased. Bardwell retired in 2012; Woods continued working until the final weeks of his life — even reading submissions while in his hospital bed. The final issue of the magazine, Cyphers 100, was published in December 2025.

The Irish Arts Council funded Cyphers entirely since its third issue (it provided half the required funding for the first two issues; six pounds of the remainder came from the widow of Patrick Kavanagh).

Cyphers started publishing following The Dublin Magazine's closure and as The Lace Curtain's penultimate issue was published. Titles considered by the editors for their new publication included Landrail, The Blackbird, and Waterhouse Clock. The husband of Ruth Brandt — who designed the lettering on the masthead of early editions — decided it. He asked the name of Ní Chuilleanáin's and Woods's black cat. She was called Cypher — a name borrowed from several of Woods' poems — based on the Arabic word for "zero" and also referring to a code.

One of the co-founders commented that though the magazine was commonly thought to intend to support new writers, this was not specifically the case at all, but that it had helped "several emergences" anyway.

== See also ==
- List of literary magazines
