= Balderstone, Greater Manchester =

District of Rochdale, England

Coordinates: 53.5999°N 2.1450°W

Balderstone
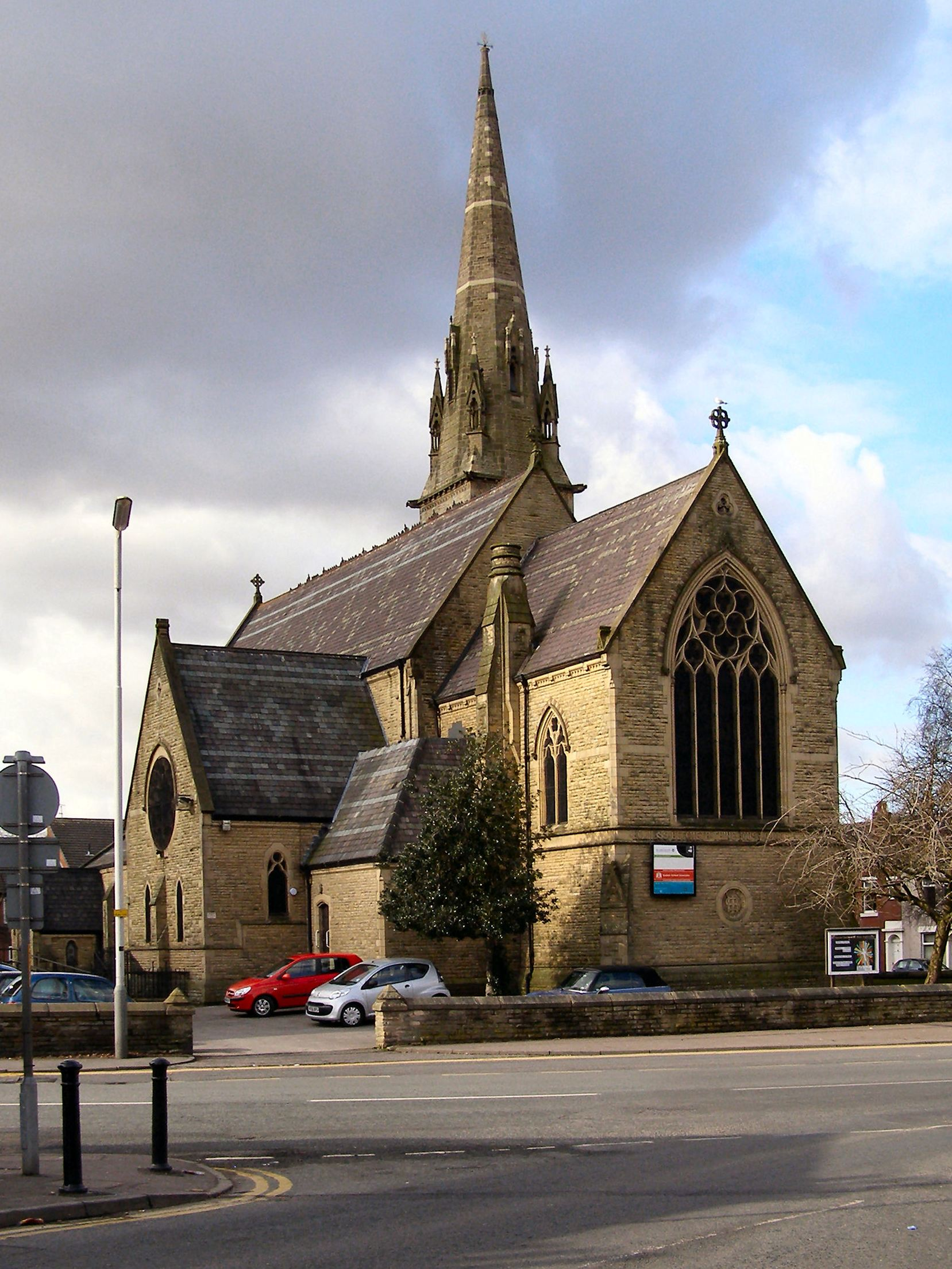
- St Mary's church

- Location within Greater Manchester
- Population: 10,422 (2011 CensusWard=Balderstone and Kirkholt)
- OS grid reference: SD9051
- Metropolitan borough: Rochdale
- Metropolitan county: Greater Manchester
- Region: North West
- Country: England
- Sovereign state: United Kingdom
- Post town: ROCHDALE
- Postcode district: OL11
- Dialling code: 01706
- Police: Greater Manchester
- Fire: Greater Manchester
- Ambulance: North West
- UK Parliament: Rochdale

Balderstone is a district and an electoral ward of the wider Metropolitan Borough of Rochdale in the county of Greater Manchester, England. According to the 2001 census the ward had a population of 9,699. As at the 2011 census the ward was called Balderstone and Kirkholt with a population of 10,422.

== Education ==
School	Description	Ofsted	Website
St Mary's C.E. Primary School, Balderstone	Primary school	105804	website
Balderstone Technology College	Secondary school	105836	

== Religion ==
St Mary's Church on Oldham Road is an Anglican church. It is one of three churches in the South Rochdale Team Ministry of Christ the King; the other two are St Luke's Church, Deeplish and St Peter's Church, Newbold.

== Notable person ==
John Ellis was born in Balderstone and became one of the United Kingdom's executioners. He hanged, or assisted in hanging, over 200 people between 1901 and 1924.
