= Hugh Haughton =

Irish academic & author

Hugh Haughton is an academic, author, editor and specialist in Irish literature and the literature of nonsense.

Born in Cork, Ireland and educated at Leighton Park School and then Cambridge and Oxford, Haughton is a professor at the University of York. He attended cambridge with Booker Prize winner Graham Swift.

Hugh Haughton's research interests lie in twentieth-century Irish literature, modern poetry and poetics in the United Kingdom, United States and Ireland; psychoanalysis and literature; and the literature of nonsense.

He has written widely and his publications include Penguin's centenary edition of Lewis Carroll's Alice in Wonderland and Through the Looking-Glass and the Chatto Book of Nonsense, an anthology of nonsense poetry.

== Publications ==
Hugh Haughton's books include:

- The Chatto Book of Nonsense Poetry (1988) (ed.)
- Rudyard Kipling, Wee Willie Winkie (1988) (ed.)
- Lewis Carroll and John Tenniel, Alice's Adventures in Wonderland: AND Through the Looking-Glass (Penguin Classics) (1998) (ed.)
- The Uncanny (Penguin Modern Classics) by Sigmund Freud (2003) (ed.)
- Second World War Poems (Faber) (2004) (ed.)
- The Poetry of Derek Mahon (Oxford, 2007)
