= Leslie Fowden =

British organic chemist and plant scientist

Professor Sir Leslie Fowden FRS
- Born: 13 October 1925; Wardle
- Died: 16 December 2008 (aged 83); Etheldred House care home, Histon
- Resting place: Cambridge crematorium
- Education: Rochdale Grammar School for Boys; University College London
- Known for: Pioneering the new field of phytochemistry; World authority on plant amino acids; Establishing the complexity and central role of plant nitrogen metabolism in plant growth
- Spouse: Margaret (Peggy) Oakes
- Children: 2
- Scientific career
- Workplaces: Medical Research Council; Cornell University; Rothamsted Research
- Doctoral advisors: Professor Ingold; Professor E. D. Hughes

Sir Leslie Fowden FRS (1925–2008) was a British organic chemist and plant scientist, notable for his pioneering research on phytochemistry and plant amino acids, as well as for his role in promoting agricultural research in the UK.

== Biography ==
Leslie Fowden was born at Birch Hill House, Wardle, Rochdale on 13 October 1925, the only child of Herbert Fowden, an iron turner, and Amy Dorothy (née Rabbich), a cotton minder. He was a diligent student who excelled at mathematics and won a fee-paying scholarship to Rochdale Grammar School for Boys (now Balderstone Technology College), where he studied from 1936 to 1943. He gained five distinctions in the School Certificate Examinations in 1940, including mathematics, physics and chemistry. In the 1942 Higher School Certificate (HSC) he was awarded distinctions for the same three subjects.

Fowden went on to read chemistry at University College (UCL) in a two-year intensive degree course (a special requirement for chemistry students in the war years). Another requirement was that he also had to participate in officer training. He was awarded a first class BSc degree in chemistry with honours, and told that he was the top student in chemistry in the University of London as a whole. He started his PhD in late 1945, supervised jointly by Professor Ingold and by Professor E. D. Hughes of the University College of Wales, Bangor. Ingold was the UK authority on organic reaction mechanisms, and Fowden was set to work investigating nucleophilic substitution in alkyl halides as the alkyl group became progressively larger or more branched in structure. The degree was awarded in 1948, and the main findings were published in 1955.

In 1947 Fowden accepted a post as scientific officer in the Human Nutrition Research Unit of the MRC in London. This was a key moment in his career, marking a move to work of more direct benefit to mankind. He was involved with two projects: (1) on kwashiorkor and a growth-retarding factor in maize bran; and (2) a chromatographic study of peanut protein hydrolysates and their free amino acid content, as part of a scheme to improve post-war nutrition and the economy of Commonwealth countries in East Africa.

Some aspects of the chromatographic work did not fit in with the MRC’s aims, so he accepted a lectureship in plant chemistry, back at UCL, where he had greater freedom. He set up a new lab where the main focus was on the identification and structural analysis of plant non-protein amino acids. He recruited PhD students and technical assistants; they, and later postdoctoral research fellows and foreign visitors, discovered several new plant amino and imino acids. Fowden isolated and characterized non-protein amino acids from a growing number and variety of plants, emphasizing their general importance in plant nitrogen metabolism.

"To isolate an unusual amino acid from the seeds of the lychee (Litchi chinensis) he had to buy large quantities of the fruit from Covent Garden. His UCL colleagues were invited to take home over the weekend as much of the fruit as they wished, provised that the washed stones were returned on the Monday morning".

His researches were recognized by promotion to a readership in 1956.

On 31 January 1955, Leslie Fowden and his family sailed on the America from Southampton to New York, en route to Ithaca, where Fowden took up a Rockefeller Visiting Fellowship to work with Professor F. C. Steward at Cornell. Their work together “provided one of the earliest demonstrations of how chemical data could be used to establish phylogenetic relationships within and between plant families and their constituent genera”. The Fowdens returned to the UK aboard the Queen Mary, arriving on 21 December 1955.

Leslie Fowden made several more trips in the coming years, including:

- A visit in 1957 to Professor Virtanen for three months at the Biochemical Institute in Helsinki
- Several trips to East Germany and the USSR in the early 1960s to attend specialist meetings on plant nitrogen metabolism and visit influential scientists of the Eastern Bloc
- In 1961 he made his first visit to California to lecture at a specialist amino acid meeting and visit University of California campuses. He returned to the University of California, Davis for a seven-month sabbatical in 1963 as a visiting professor. In the summers of 1969 and 1970 Fowden returned to Davis on a NATO Cooperative grant
- He was the first Royal Society visiting professor to the University of Hong Kong in 1967, where he was attached to the Botany Department for four months

These trips strengthened his love of travel and languages.

In 1972 Fowden was invited to fill the post of Director of Rothamsted Experimental Station; he took up the position on 1 April 1973. When he arrived the research being undertaken by some 500 scientists “needed reinvigoration—and new investment—to regain its past reputation for scientific excellence”. Fragmented departments were combined into five new divisions. In 1986 Rothamsted itself was amalgamated with other Stations across the country to form the new Institute of Arable Crops Research (IACR), and Fowden became its inaugural director. He retired in 1988, but did not slow down. He joined the council of the Royal Institution and became a trustee and then Director of the Foundation and Friends of Kew Gardens. He became a scientific adviser to several international agrochemical companies, and maintained visiting professorships at the University of London and the University of Wales Swansea.

== Honours, degrees and awards ==
- 1945 BSc (first class honours) Chemistry, University College, University of London
- 1948 PhD Physical Organic Chemistry, University College
- 1964 Fellow of the Royal Society
- 1966 Fellow of University College London
- 1967 Royal Society Visiting Prof., University of Hong Kong
- 1970 Council of Royal Society
- 1971 Foreign Member of Deutsche Akademie der Naturforsher Leopoldina
- 1978 Foreign Member of Lenin All-Union Academy of Agricultural Sciences of the USSR
- 1981 Corresponding Member of the American Society of Plant Physiologists
- 1982 Birthday Honours Knighthood
- 1986 Foreign Member of the Academy of Agricultural Sciences of the German Democratic Republic
- 1986 Honorary Member of the Phytochemical Society of Europe
- 1989 Lawes Trust Senior Fellow, Rothamsted Experimental Station
- 1991 Foreign Member of the Russian Academy of Agricultural Sciences
- 1992 DSc (honorary), University of Westminster
- 1992 Fellowship of the International Institute of Biotechnology
- 1994 Director of the Foundation and Friends of Kew Gardens

== Family ==
Leslie Fowden married fellow chemistry student Margaret (Peggy) Oakes on 9 July 1949 at the Methodist chapel in East Ham. They had two children:

- Abigail L, born on 13 January 1954. She is now retired but was formerly Professor of Perinatal Physiology at the Department of Physiology, Development and Neuroscience, University of Cambridge
- Jeremy S G, born in 1957 and has served in senior executive positions in eight or more companies. He is currently with Constellation Brands, a leading international producer and marketer of beer, wine, and spirits.

Sir Leslie Fowden died from renal and heart failure at a care home in Histon on 16 December 2008 and was cremated in Cambridge on the 29th.
