= John McLachlan (composer) =

Irish composer (born 1964)

John McLachlan (born 5 March 1964) is an Irish composer.

== Life ==
McLachlan was born in Dublin, son of the writer Leland Bardwell, and studied at the DIT Conservatory of Music and Drama (1982–6), the Royal Irish Academy of Music (1989–97), and Trinity College Dublin (BA 1988), where he received a Ph.D. in musicology in 1999 for a study of the relationship between analysis and compositional technique in the post-war avant-garde. He has also studied privately with Robert Hanson (1989–90) and Kevin Volans (1994–5). He now lives in Inishowen, County Donegal.

He has written numerous articles for The Journal of Music in Ireland (2000–10; now the online Journal of Music). He was executive director of the Association of Irish Composers (AIC; 1998–2012), and in 2007 he was elected to Aosdána.

McLachlan was the featured composer in the RTÉ National Symphony Orchestra's "Horizons" series in 2003 and 2008. He has also represented Ireland at international festivals, including the ISCM World Music Days in Slovenia in 2003 Croatia in 2005 and New Zealand in 2022. In 2006, his work Grand Action was commissioned as a test piece for the AXA Dublin International Piano Competition.

== Music ==
McLachlan's musical aesthetic is largely shaped by a desire to impart a sense of narrative and expectation to his music without recourse to pastiche rhetorical devices. A critic wrote of a recording of McLachlan's piano piece Nine: "The style of each little piece sends one's imagination and musical memory reeling, some of them evoking French Impressionism, some jazzy in feel, some reminiscent of the miniatures for piano of Webern, and none of them in any way, shape or form derivative." Much of his music is structured in contrasting and suddenly changing block-like sections of homogeneous material. The material within these sections is propelled by a rigorous focus on subtle rhythmic and melodic permutations, which result in both surface opacity and gradually increasing tension.

== Select compositions ==
Orchestral

- Concerto for Chamber Orchestra (1988)
- Here Be Dragons (2003)
- Triptych (2004)
- Octala (2007)
- Incunabula (2007)
- Taca (2011)
- The Inishowen Set (2013)

Chamber music

- Two Lyric Sketches (1987; rev. 1991), for string quartet
- Heuristic Pieces (1990; rev. 2003), for clarinet, horn, violin, viola, cello
- Suspirations 1 (1991), for 3 trumpets, horn, trombone
- Suspirations 2 (1991; rev. 1992), for clarinet, oboe, horn, violin, cello, double bass
- Frieze (1993), for flute, oboe, clarinet, horn, percussion, violin, cello, double bass
- Concords (1997), for clarinet, violin, cello, piano
- Meetings with Remarkable Men (2001), for 4 percussionists
- Filament of Memory (2002), for 4 guitars
- Radical Roots (2003), for violin, viola, cello [rescored for 2 pianos, 2005]
- neo-plastic coloured shapes (2003), for string quartet
- The Metal Pig (2004), for clarinet, violin, cello, piano
- Ghost Machine (2004), for violin and piano
- Fragile (2004), for alto flute and guitar
- Leaves Loose (2006), for piccolo/flute/alto-flute/bass-flute, oboe/oboe d'amore/cor anglais, clarinet/bass-clarinet
- Wonder (2008), for clarinet, glockenspiel, organ, e-guitar, violin, double bass
- Extraordinary Rendition (2008), for violin, cello, piano
- Natural Order (2009), for violin, cello, piano
- Five Points, Manhattan (2010), for 7 percussionists
- Where we are (2012), for string quartet
- Fragment (After Lafcadio Hearn) (2016), for speaker and piano
- Deliquescence (Leland Bardwell) (2016), for soprano, clarinet, piano
- Glad it Was the Sun (2016), for string quartet
- Venise en hiver (Jeanine Baude) (1995), for mezzo-soprano, alto sax, piano
- Diomedea (2017), for saxophone and contrabass recorder doubling treble recorder
- Isola (2019), for flute/alto flute and piano
- Headland (2021), for violin, viola, cello, piano, flute, clarinet, bassoon and fixed media
- Atalanta (2023), for viola and piano

Solo instrumental

- Five Movements for Piano (1983)
- Four Short Pieces for Guitar (1988)
- Two Piano Studies (1994)
- From the Strings of a Rainbow (1996), for piano
- Fifteen Easy Miniatures (1998), for piano
- Archaeopteryx (1996; rev. 1997), for piano
- Here Be Dragons (2001; rev. 2003), for organ
- Nuance (2003), for piano
- Grand Action (2005), for piano
- Soft Landing (2009), for organ
- Nine (2011), for piano
- Drinking the Stars (2012), for piano
- Ex Machina (2013), for piano
- Filament(s) I to VI (2014–18), solo pieces for flute, trombone, cello, bassoon, guitar, clarinet
- Sweeney Exulans (2018), for Irish harp
- Under the Flagstones (2018), for organ
- fiaili ceoil (2019), for piano
- Stone Bell and Sandwave (2020), for piano

Choral works

- Two Akhmatova Settings (Anna Akhmatova) (1986), for mixed chorus
- Two Poems in Memoriam Stevie Smith (Leland Bardwell) (1986), for mixed chorus
- Lord, What Love Have I (Psalm 119) (1988), for mixed chorus and organ
- He Wishes for the Cloths of Heaven (W. B. Yeats) (1995), for mixed chorus
- The Eternal Rebel (Eva Gore-Booth) (2016), for soprano, tenor, choir, piano, keyboard, harmonica

Electro-acoustic works

- The Red Thread (2000), for guitar and electro-acoustics
- Golden Circle (2010), for flute, clarinet, violin, cello, piano, electro-acoustics
- Dog Ear (2013) fixed media
- Aurora (2013), for flute/bass-flute, clarinet/bass-clarinet, cello, piano, electro-acoustics
- Sparsa (2015) fixed media
- Sympathetic Strings (2016), for guitar and electro-acoustics
- This is Real (2019), for violin, viola, cello, bass, string orchestra, electro-acoustics
- Twelve Celestial Objects (2020) fixed media
- A fine example of how (not) to live (2023) for clarinets and fixed media, texts Leland Bardwell
- Le dernier bourgeon de l'avenir (2023) fixed media

== Bibliography ==
- Adrian Smith: "McLachlan, John", in: The Encyclopaedia of Music in Ireland, edited by Harry White and Barra Boydell (Dublin: UCD Press, 2013), p. 654–5.
- Benjamin Dwyer: "Interview with John Mclachlan", in: Different Voices: Irish Music and Music in Ireland (Hofheim: Wolke Verlag, 2014), p. 178–191.

== Discography ==
- Drinking The Stars (2023), a double CD of piano music performed by Mary Dullea, in farpoint recordings https://jmclachlan.bandcamp.com/album/drinking-the-stars
- First, CD of six of McLachlan's pieces featuring various musicians including RTE National Symphony Orchestra https://digital.farpointrecordings.com/album/first
- Filament of Memory, Dublin Guitar Quartet, Contemporary Irish https://www.dublinguitarquartet.com/copy-of-deleted-pieces
- Nine, Gothic, Mary Dullea, Metier Records https://divineartrecords.com/recording/gothic-new-piano-music-from-ireland/
- Four Pieces for Guitar, Islands, John Feeley, Overture Music https://www.cmc.ie/shop/islands-contemporary-irish-solo-and-ensemble-works-guitar
- Grand Action, Maria McGarry, CMC CD 9
- Here be Dragons, David Adams, Irish Contemporary Organ Music
- Two Lyric Sketches, Hibernia trio + Ken Rice quartet, AIC CD1

== Writings on Music ==
- Articles by John McLachlan in the Journal of Music
