= Paul Durcan =

Irish poet (1944–2025)

- Pól Mac Duarcáin
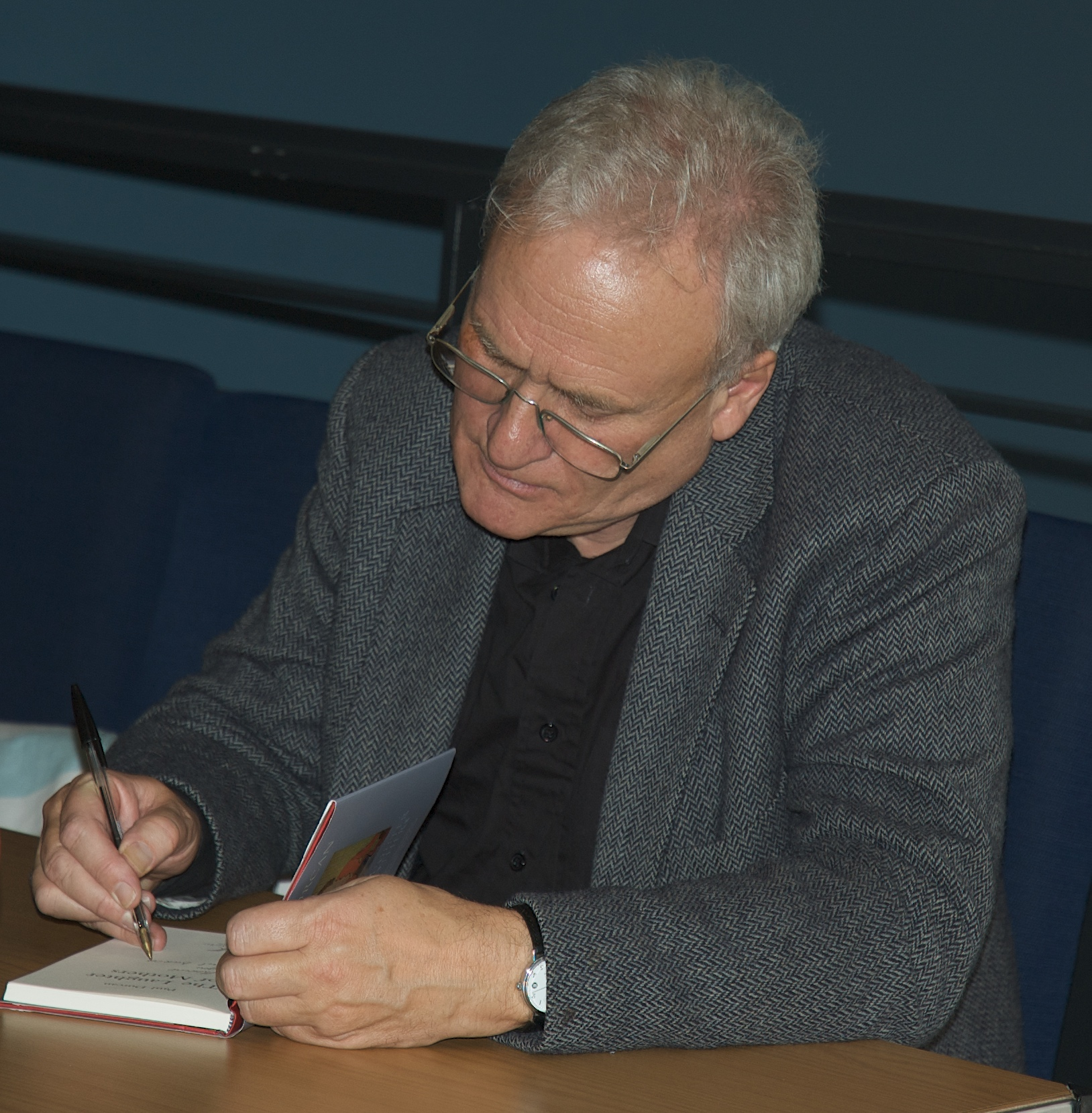
- Durcan in 2008
- Born: 16 October 1944; Dublin, Ireland
- Died: 17 May 2025 (aged 80); Dublin, Ireland
- Occupation: Poet
- Years active: 1967–2016
- Spouse: Nessa O'Neill (m. 1968; div. 1984)
- Children: 2

Paul Francis Durcan (16 October 1944 – 17 May 2025) was an Irish poet who was Ireland Professor of Poetry between 2004 and 2007.

== Early life and education ==
Paul Francis Durcan was born in Dublin on 16 October 1944. He grew up in Dublin and spent his summers in Turlough, County Mayo. His father, John, was a barrister and circuit court judge and his mother Sheila MacBride from Westport was a qualified solicitor.

In the early 1960s, he studied Economics at University College Dublin. While at college, Durcan was committed to St. John of God Hospital. In the 1970s, he studied archaeology and medieval history at University College Cork.

== Career ==
In 1966, Durcan moved to London, where he worked with fellow Irish poet Michael Hartnett as a security guard at the North Thames Gas Board.

Durcan's main published collections include: A Snail in my Prime, Crazy About Women, Greetings to Our Friends in Brazil and Cries of an Irish Caveman.

He appeared on the 1990 Van Morrison album Enlightenment, giving an idiosyncratic vocal performance on the song, "In the Days Before Rock 'N' Roll", which he also co-wrote.

In 2003, he published a collection of his weekly addresses to the nation, Paul Durcan's Diary, on the RTÉ Radio 1 programme Today with.... Between 2004 and 2007, Durcan was the third Ireland Professor of Poetry.

== Recognition ==
Durcan was a founding member of national artists' organisation Aosdána, in 1981. He was shortlisted in 2005 for the Poetry Now Award for his collection, The Art of Life. In 2009, he was conferred with an honorary degree by Trinity College Dublin, and in 2011, he was conferred with an honorary doctorate from University College Dublin.

Durcan was the Ireland Fund Artist-in-Residence in the Celtic Studies Department of St. Michael's College at the University of Toronto in October 2009.

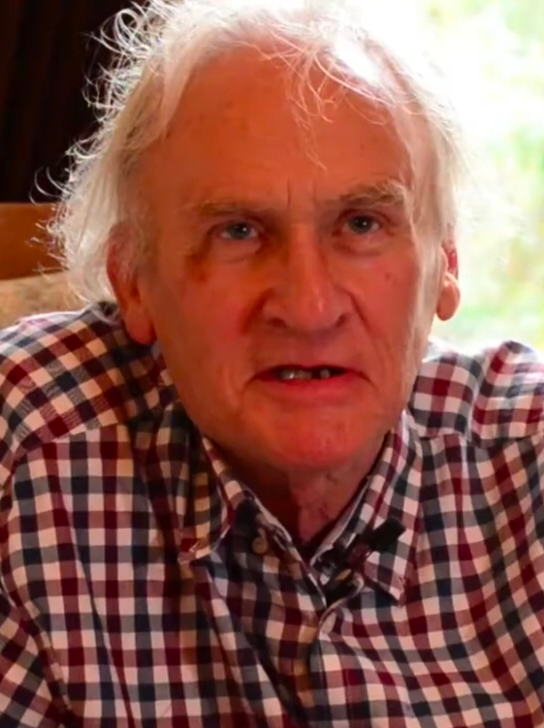
Durcan in 2018

A number of his poems are studied by Irish students for the Leaving Certificate.

== Personal life and death ==
Durcan met Nessa O'Neill, from Dublin, at a wedding at the Shangri la Hotel in 1967; they married the next year and had two daughters. Initially they lived in Barcelona, then London, and then, returning to Ireland, they moved to Cork, where Nessa qualified as a teacher and taught in Cork prison. The marriage ended in early 1984.

Paul had a son Michael John O'Neill in 1988 with another partner. He lived in Ringsend in Dublin's docklands for 35 years, from where he travelled and gave poetry performances all over the world. In the last years of his life, Durcan was in poor health; the National Library of Ireland received his collected papers in 2024.

Durcan died from cardiomyopathy at a care home in Dublin, on 17 May 2025, at the age of 80. Following a traditional Ringsend funeral, he was buried in the old section of Aughavale cemetery in Westport, County Mayo.

== Awards ==
- 1974 – Patrick Kavanagh Poetry Award
- 1989 – Irish American Cultural Institute Poetry Award
- 1990 – The Whitbread Award (for Daddy, Daddy)
- Poetry Book Society choice for The Berlin Wall Café
- 2001 – Cholmondeley Award

== Works ==
- Endsville, with Brian Lynch (New Writers Press, 1967)
- O Westport in the Light of Asia Minor (Anna Livia Press, 1975)
- Sam's Cross (Profile Press, 1978)
- Teresa's Bar (Gallery Press, 1976; revised edition, Gallery Press, 1986)
- Jesus, Break his Fall (Raven Arts Press, 1980)
- Ark of the North (Raven Arts Press, 1982)
- The Selected Paul Durcan (edited by Edna Longley, Blackstaff Press, 1982)
- Jumping the Train Tracks with Angela (Raven Arts Press/Carcanet New Press, 1983)
- The Berlin Wall Café (Blackstaff Press, 1985)
- Going Home to Russia (Blackstaff Press, 1987)
- Daddy, Daddy (Blackstaff Press, 1990)
- Crazy About Women (National Gallery of Ireland, 1991)
- A Snail in My Prime: New and Selected Poems, (Harvill Secker / Blackstaff Press, 1993)
- Give Me Your Hand (MacMillan, 1994)
- Christmas Day (Harvill Press, 1997)
- Greetings to Our Friends in Brazil (Harvill Press, 1999)
- Cries of an Irish Caveman (Harvill Press, 2001)
- The Art of Life (Harvill Press, 2004)
- The Laughter of Mothers (Harvill Press, 2007)
- Life Is a Dream: 40 Years Reading Poems 1967-2007 (Random House UK, 2009)
- Praise In Which I Live And Move And Have My Being (Harvill Secker, 2012)
- The Days of Surprise (Harvill Secker, 2015)
- Wild, Wild Erie: Poems Inspired by Paintings and Sculpture in the Toledo Museum of Art, Ohio (Toledo Museum of Art, 2016)

=== Diary ===
This collection gives a previously unseen view of Durcan's work and a more personal view of him and his poetry. It gives an insight into his childhood.
