= Springhill High School, Rochdale =

Coordinates: 53.6049°N 2.1378°W

Location
- Turf Hill Road; Rochdale, Greater Manchester, OL16 4XA; United Kingdom

Information
- Type: High School; Foundation School
- Closed: 31 August 2010
- Local authority: Rochdale
- Ofsted: Reports
- Headteacher: Annabel Bolt
- Gender: Mixed
- Age: 11 to 16
- Website: https://www.springhillhigh.net

Springhill High School was a co-educational secondary school on Turf Hill Road in Rochdale, Greater Manchester, England. The catchment area consists of the neighbouring areas: Newbold, Kirkholt, Deeplish, Turf Hill and Belfield.

The school closed 31 August 2010 as a result of the Building Schools for the Future program. The school merged with Balderstone Technology College and formed a new school called Kingsway Park High School. The new school is based on the old Spring Hill High School site.
