= Kingsway Park High School =

School in Greater Manchester, England

Location
- Turf Hill Road; Kingsway, Rochdale, Greater Manchester, OL16 4XA; England; 53°36′17″N 2°08′19″W

Information
- Type: Academy
- Established: 1 September 2010
- Local authority: Rochdale
- Trust: Altus Education Partnership
- Department for Education URN: 148790 Tables
- Ofsted: Reports
- Head teacher: Simon Ward
- Gender: Mixed-sex
- Age: 11 to 16
- Enrolment: 1320
- Website: https://www.kingswaypark.org

Kingsway Park High School is an 11–16 mixed secondary School that opened in September 2010. The school is located in the Kingsway area of the Metropolitan Borough of Rochdale in Greater Manchester, United Kingdom. The school has approximately 1320 students on roll, with at least 14 countries represented across this number.

== History ==
The school was established as a result of an amalgamation of Balderstone Technology College and Springhill High School under the Building Schools for the Future program.

The schools trust, Kingsway Learning Trust Limited was established in May 2010 by partner school Middleton Technology School along with Rochdale Sixth Form College and the Rochdale local authority.

Previously a foundation school administered by Rochdale Borough Council and Kingsway Learning Trust, in February 2022 Kingsway Park High School converted to academy status. The school is now sponsored by the Altus Education Partnership.

== School performance ==
In the most recent Ofsted Inspection (September 2013), Kingsway Park High School was awarded "good" in all criteria with Inspectors noting continued improvements in Exam Results along with attendance and other key performance criteria. It is also good to mention that there was a short inspection from Ofsted in July 2017 and February 2025, however no changes were made to the previous ranking.

== New school building ==
Under the Building Schools for the Future program and opening in September 2013, the school receive a new £13 million building built on the former Springhill High School site on Turf Hill Road.
