= Balderstone Technology College =

Location
- Queen Victoria Street; Balderstone, Greater Manchester, OL11 2HJ; England; 53°36′01″N 2°08′59″W

Information
- Type: Grammar School; Technology College
- Motto: "Dare and you will prevail"
- Established: 1953 (as Rochdale Grammar School for Boys)
- Closed: 31 August 2010
- Local authority: Rochdale MBC
- Specialist: Technology
- Department for Education URN: 105836 Tables
- Headteacher: Mr Paul Wright; Mr Nigel Jepson
- Staff: 150
- Gender: Mixed
- Age: 11 to 16
- Enrolment: 785
- Former name: Rochdale Grammar School & Balderstone Community School
- Website: www.btc.ac.uk

Balderstone Technology College was a school in the Balderstone district of the Metropolitan Borough of Rochdale in Greater Manchester, England.

== Location ==
It was situated near the junction of Queensway (A664) and Oldham Road (A671) between Balderstone and Kirkholt. It was in the parish of St Mary, Balderstone.

== History ==
=== Grammar school ===
The school was once called Rochdale Grammar School for Boys, formerly known as Rochdale Municipal High School for Boys on Church Lane. It was administered by Rochdale Education Committee, and moved to Queen Victoria Street in 1953 at a cost of £180,000. A grammar school had been founded in 1565 in Rochdale by Matthew Parker, then Archbishop of Canterbury. There was also Rochdale Grammar School for Girls on Falinge Road, becoming Falinge Park High School.

=== Comprehensive ===
It became a comprehensive in 1967 – the Balderstone High School, then Balderstone Community School in 1972 for boys and girls aged 14–18. In 1992 it became a high school for boys and girls aged 11–16. In 1999 it gained Technology College status.

The school closed on 31 August 2010 as a result of the Building Schools for the Future program. The school merged with Springhill High School and formed a new school called Kingsway Park High School. The building was used to host Kingsway Park High School until 2012 when a new building was built on the former Springhill High School site, Turfhill Road.

== Alumni ==
- Fusilier Conrad Cole, youngest British soldier to die in the Gulf War on 26 February 1991 aged 17, when nine British soldiers of the 3rd Battalion of the Royal Regiment of Fusiliers were killed by an American missile fired from an A-10 which hit a Warrior tracked armoured vehicle.

=== Rochdale Grammar School ===
- James Diggle, Professor of Greek and Latin at Queens' College, University of Cambridge since 1995
- Sir Leslie Fowden, Director from 1973 to 1986 of the Rothamsted Experimental Station
- Glynn Boyd Harte, artist
- Sir Peter Ogden, businessman who founded Computacenter in 1981 and Dealogic in 1983
- Sir Joseph Pilling, KCB, Identity Commissioner since 2009, and Director General from 1991 to 1992 of HM Prison Service
- Cyril Smith MP
- John Taylor, Lecturer in Greek and Latin Language at University of Manchester since 2015
