= Eithne Jordan =

Irish painter (born 1954)

- Born: 1954 (age 71–72); Dublin, Ireland
- Education: Dún Laoghaire College of Art and Design; Berlin University of the Arts
- Known for: Painting
- Movement: Neo-expressionism
- Partner: Michael Cullen
- Children: 1
- Elected: Aosdána (1990)
- Website: eithnejordan.ie

Eithne Jordan RHA (/ˈɛθnə/; born 1954) is an Irish painter, described as a neo-expressionist.

== Career ==
Jordan studied at the Dún Laoghaire College of Art and Design. She was awarded a German Academic Exchange Service (DAAD) scholarship to study at the Berlin University of the Arts in West Berlin.

She was elected to the Royal Hibernian Academy and Aosdána in 1990. According to the Irish Museum of Modern Art, she "looks at the contemporary urban environment and is drawn to anonymous urban spaces, the side spaces, factory roofs, subway tunnels, underpasses, and blank walls – those non-places that are forgotten spaces in cities."

== Personal life ==
Jordan was born in Dublin in 1954. She grew up in Clontarf. Jordan is currently based in Languedoc and Ireland. She lived with fellow artist Michael Cullen for many years; they had one son.
