= Paula Meehan =

Irish poet and playwright

- Paula Meehan, 2009

Paula Meehan (born 1955) is an Irish poet and playwright.

== Life ==
Paula Meehan was born in Dublin in 1955, the eldest of six children. She subsequently moved to London with her parents where she attended St. Elizabeth's Primary School in Kingston upon Thames. She then returned to Dublin with her family where she attended a number of primary schools finishing her primary education at the Central Model Girls' School off Gardiner Street. She began her secondary education at St. Michael's Holy Faith Convent in Finglas but was expelled for organising a protest march against the regime of the school. She studied for her Intermediate Certificate on her own and then went to Whitehall House Senior College, a vocational school, to study for her Leaving Certificate.

Outside school, she was a member of a dance drama group, became involved in band culture and, around 1970, began to write lyrics. Gradually composing song lyrics would give way to writing poetry.

At Trinity College, Dublin, (1972–1977) she studied English, History and Classical Civilization, taking five years to complete her Bachelor of Arts degree. This included one year off, spent travelling through Europe. While a student she was involved in street theatre and various kinds of performance.

After college she travelled again, spending long stretches in Greece, Germany, Scotland and England. She was offered a teaching fellowship at Eastern Washington University where she studied (1981–1983) with James J. McAuley in a two-year programme which led to a Master of Fine Arts degree in Poetry. Gary Snyder and Carolyn Kizer were among the distinguished visiting writers to have a profound influence on her work and on her thought.

She returned to Dublin in 1983.

== Work ==
Meehan has also written poetry for film, for contemporary dance companies and for collaborations with visual artists; her poems have been put to music by songwriters (including Christy Moore) and composers. Her poetry has been extensively published in translation, including substantial collections in French and German.

The 2015 Poetry Competition 'A Poem for Ireland' shortlisted her 1991 poem 'The Statue of the Virgin at Granard Speaks' in the final ten poems. She selected poems for and introduced the Candlestick Press anthology Ten Poems from Ireland in 2017.

Meehan was a judge for the 2020 Griffin Poetry Prize and the 2024 PEN Heaney Prize.

== Recognition ==
In September 2013, Meehan was installed as the Ireland Professor of Poetry by President Michael D. Higgins.

In 2023, she was elected an honorary fellow of Trinity College Dublin.
