= Fattypuffs and Thinifers =

1930 book by André Maurois

- Title page of original French edition
- Author: André Maurois
- Original title: Patapoufs et Filifers
- Translator: Norman Denny
- Illustrator: Jean Bruller
- Language: French
- Genre: Children's literature
- Publisher: The Bodley Head
- Publication date: 1930
- Publication place: France
- English publication date: 1941
- Media type: Print (hardback)
- Pages: 96
- OCLC: 258165503

Fattypuffs and Thinifers (ISBN 1-903252-07-5) is a 1941 translation of the French children's book Patapoufs et Filifers originally written in 1930 by André Maurois. It concerns the imaginary underground land of the fat and congenial Fattypuffs and the thin and irritable Thinifers, which is visited by the Double brothers, the plump Edmund and the thin Terry. Fattypuffs and Thinifers do not mix, and their respective countries are on the verge of war when Edmund and Terry make their visit.

== Plot summary ==
Edmund and Terry find the entrance through the Twin Rock, where a long escalator descends into the bowels of the earth. The underground region is illuminated by large balloons filled with a blue, dazzling gas, which float in the underground sky.

At the bottom of the escalator a narrow quay, Surface-by-the-Sea, borders a large gulf. Edmund and Terry are separated here. Edmund is taken to Fattyborough, the capital of the Fattypuff kingdom, on the ship Fattiport, while Terry is ordered to board the steel vessel Thiniport for Thiniville, capital of the Thinifer Republic.

Edmund soon assumes a position in the administration of Fattypuff, whose inhabitants are friendly and happy. Their architecture is made up of domes, baroques, and other round buildings. Terry also rises through the ranks quickly in the land of the Thinifers, whose citizens are very work focued. Their architecture is all high, sharp spires and thin railway cars, very unlike the land of the Fattypuffs.

For centuries Fattypuffs and Thinifers have been mortal enemies, having fought one another already in the War of the Captive Armies. Their main source of tension lies over ownership of an island in the gulf that separates the countries, and what to call it - the Fattypuffs prefer "Fattyfer," the Thinifers "Thinipuff." Negotiations, in which Edmund and Terry participate, are unsuccessful, and the countries go to war. The Thinifers emerge as the victors, and annex the Fattypuff kingdom.

The consequences of this annexation are unexpected. Many soldiers of the occupying army of the Thinifers begin to marry Fattypuff girls, and return to their homeland with affection for the country that they conquered. The Thinifers begin to adopt Fattypuff cuisine, habits, and attitudes. Consequently, the Thinifer president proclaims that the two peoples form a new nation, the United States of the Underground. King Plumpapuff of the Fattypuffs is made constitutional sovereign, while the Thinifer president is made his chancellor. All distinctions by weight are abolished. A toponymic compromise is reached: the island of Fattyfer-Thinipuff is called Peachblossom Island.

Edmund and Terry are allowed to return home, where their father has been looking for them at the base of the Twin Rock. They spent ten months underground, but only an hour has passed on the surface.

== Reception ==
"To The Times Literary Supplement on 27 December 1941, 'This most amusing fantasy' won pride of place in a review of many juveniles, but purely as comedy..." "From France comes this hilariously nonsensical account of an underground land divided into two countries... The story offers endless possibilities for discussion in the classroom around the subject of politics and international conflicts, but most of all it will be enjoyed for its ingenious plot and zany characterisation. Fritz Wegner's line illustrations play an indispensable part in bringing this story alive." The Irish Independent chose Fattypuffs and Thinifers as one of the top 50 books for children, while Anthea Bell chose it as one of "her top 10 favourite books in translation that she would recommend for children."

George Millar wrote: "Technically, Maurois' book belongs to the subgenre of Hollow Earth fantasies, imagining vast countries stretching in enormous caverns right there under our feet, like Journey to the Center of the Earth penned by Maurois' illustrious countryman. However, the underground location need not be taken too seriously. Maurois was writing a political fantasy and parable, not a physical one.(...) The code is not really difficult to unravel. Two countries who are hereditary enemies, with divergent cultures and ways of life—one endlessly, pedantically precise and methodical, the other addicted to gourmet food and the good things of life - who can they be but Germans and French.(...) On this basis Maurois can be credited with predicting that there would be a new war and that France would be occupied by Germany; he can also be credited with predicting that there would be ultimately a reconciliation and an end to the prolonged enmity between these two countries - even if the actual EU falls a bit short of the complete unification in the story's happy ending...".
