= Ireland Professor of Poetry =

The position of Ireland Professor of Poetry is an academic chair, jointly administered in trust by Queen's University Belfast, Trinity College Dublin, University College Dublin, the Arts Council of Northern Ireland and the Arts Council. The post and the funding for it were put in place to commemorate the awarding of the Nobel Prize in Literature to the poet Seamus Heaney in 1995. A new professor is appointed every three years. During the period of appointment, the professor spends one year attached to each of the three universities, and is in residence at the university for eight weeks during that year, conducting workshops and promoting poetry.

== List of Ireland Professors of Poetry ==
- John Montague (1998)
- Nuala Ní Dhomhnaill (2001)
- Paul Durcan (2004)
- Michael Longley (2007)
- Harry Clifton (2010)
- Paula Meehan (2013)
- Eiléan Ní Chuilleanáin (2016)
- Frank Ormsby (2019)
- Paul Muldoon (2022)
- Vona Groarke (2025)
