= Anne Bushnell =

- Birth name: Anne Kavanagh
- Born: 28 March 1939; Rotunda hospital, Dublin, Ireland
- Died: 21 April 2011 (aged 72)

Anne Bushnell (28 March 1939 – 21 April 2011) was an Irish jazz and blues singer and cabaret performer.

== Early life and family ==
Anne Bushnell was born Anne Kavanagh in the Rotunda Hospital, Dublin on 28 March 1939. She was one of four children of John Kavanagh and Evelyn (née Ledwidge). Her father was a motor mechanic with a business on Arnott Street, Portobello, with the family living in Milltown. Bushnell danced on the stage of the Theatre Royal as a child, and was a junior Irish champion dancer. She attended the St Louis convent school in Rathmines, where she performed in plays and musicals and sang in the school choir. The nuns disapproved of her musical influences, and tried to dissuade her interest in jazz and "the music of the night". Due to the family's financial circumstances, she left school at age 16 and took a job as a typist. She married Tony Bushnell in April 1961. He was a salesman who shared her interest in music. The couple moved to Templeogue, and had a daughter, Suzanne, and a son, Paul. Paul is now a session musician based in Los Angeles, and Suzanne sings with a female vocal harmony group, Fallen Angels.

== Career ==
Bushnell had continued to perform in amateur musicals, and from the early 1960s she sang with an Irish céilí band. With help from her husband's musical family, she sang in Dublin jazz clubs from 1967, emerging as a well respected jazz and blues vocalist and cabaret performer. She competed in the national song contest in 1968 singing Ballad to a Boy, and became a resident singer in the RTÉ Light Orchestra. By the late 1960s, Bushnell was one of the busiest singers in Ireland, singing jingles for radio and TV commercials, and featuring on showband records as a backing singer. She was a regular guest on RTÉ television variety shows from 1970, including hosting Girls, girls, girls.

From 1972 to 1974, Bushnell was part of a group called Family Pride, which was a group of session musicians who recorded together regularly. They competed in the 1973 national song contest, playing in Dublin venues and on radio shows. The group had two top ten Irish hits. Their 1973 album, Family Pride, was not a chart success however. Bushnell represented Ireland at a number of international contests and festivals as a solo artist, releasing a few singles and an unsuccessful album with CBS Records, Are you ready (1977). She was a backing singer for two of Ireland's entries to the Eurovision Song Contest in 1974 and 1980. She was a regular in stage musicals from the mid to later 1970s, in productions such as the tribute shows to Jacques Brel (1974) and Bing Crosby (1978), sometimes performing alongside her brother John Kavanagh. From the late 1970s she appeared in pantomimes with Maureen Potter.

In 1984 Bushnell starred in a musical based on the life of Édith Piaf, No regrets, written specially for her by Leland Bardwell. She was lauded for capturing Piaf's stage presence and husky voice. The show suffered when it had to move from the Gaiety Theatre to the National Stadium. Bushnell reworked it into a successful one-woman show called The Little Sparrow, and also devised a one-woman tribute to Judy Garland. Her cabaret act in the late 1980s was highly successful, featuring big numbers by Brel, Garland, and Piaf. Due to her talent at singing blues and jazz, she was awarded the freedom of New Orleans by its mayor in 1986.

== Later life and death ==
Bushnell struggled with depression brought on initially by an underactive thyroid, and later exacerbated by her father's death and her husband's unemployment in the late 1980s. Disheartened by the lack of recognition in Ireland and her family's financial difficulties, she considered emigrating or returning to her career as a typist. To aid with her depression, she took up painting in 1992, holding a number of exhibitions in Dublin. She continued to sing regularly until her death, often at events for charity. She was awarded the Cheshire Foundation award in 1994 for her charitable work. Bushnell also appeared in the film Agnes Browne. She died on 21 April 2011 in Tallaght Hospital, County Dublin of cancer, and was cremated at Mount Jerome Crematorium.
