= John Kavanagh (actor) =

Irish actor

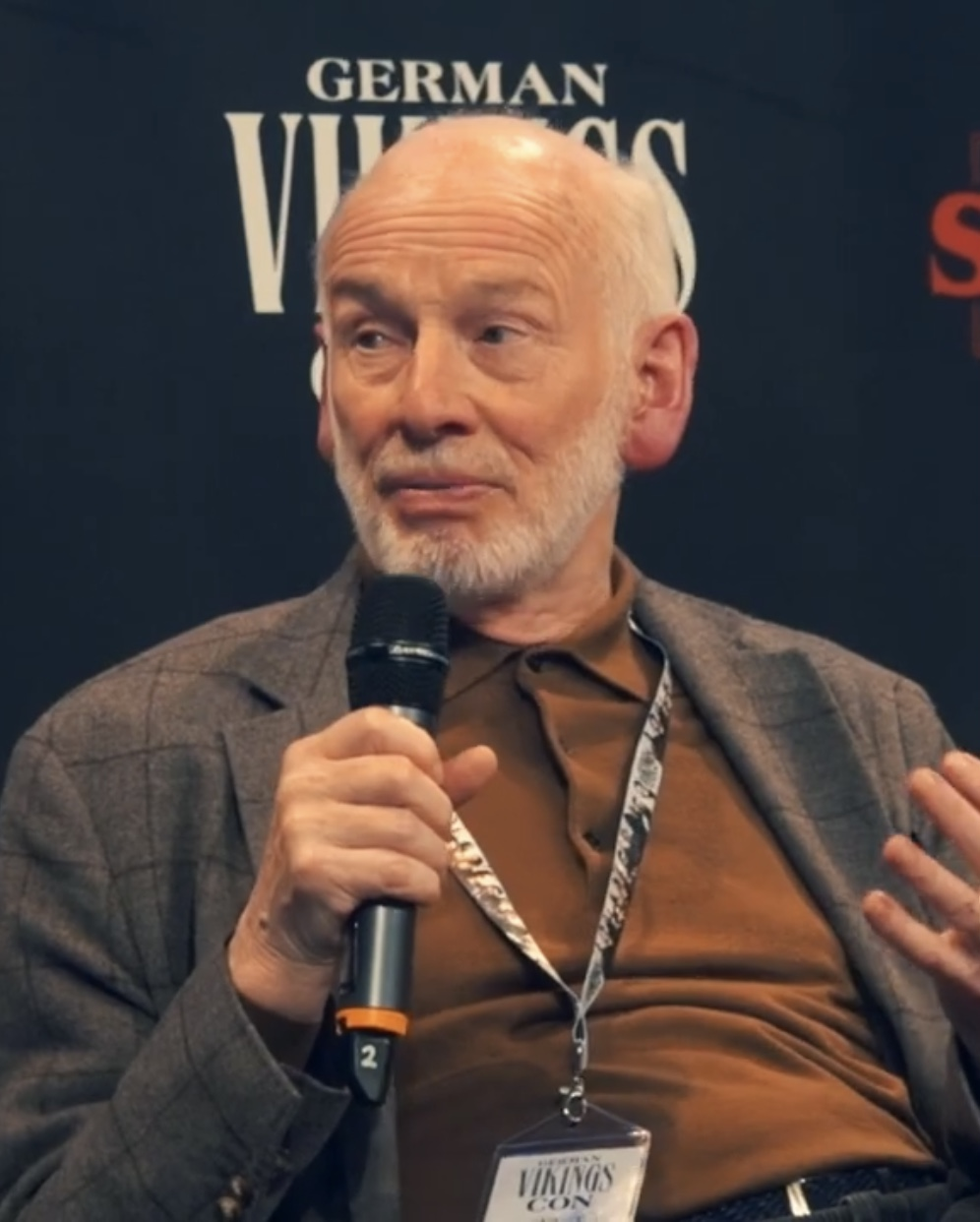
- Kavanagh at the 2022 German Vikings Con
- Born: 1946 (age 79–80)
- Occupation: Actor

John Kavanagh (born 1946) is an Irish actor who has acted on the stage, in over twenty films including Cal (1984), Braveheart (1995) and Alexander (2004), and on television. Most recently, he is known for his portrayal of The Seer in the History Channel series Vikings. He has received a number of accolades, including a Drama Desk Award nomination in 1989 for his role in a revival of Juno and the Paycock.

== Education ==
Kavanagh attended the Brendan Smyth Academy from the age of 19 and then trained at the Abbey Theatre. In 1967, he joined the Abbey company and stayed with them for 10 years before becoming a freelancer.

== Career ==
Kavanagh began his career with the Irish comedy Paddy (1970), where he played the small role of Willie Egan. That same year, he played another small role in the World War II film The McKenzie Break (1970), about a POW camp in Scotland whose prisoners are preparing an escape. A singer as well as an actor, Kavanagh played the lead in the Irish stage production of Jacques Brel Is Alive and Well and Living in Paris in the 1970s (alongside his sister Anne Bushnell). He also starred in the subsequent television production, which aired in December 1978.

The next twelve years brought Kavanagh no new films, though he continued to act on stage. Finally, he decided to return to screen acting with the theatrical film The Ballroom of Romance (1982), which put him in a romance with actress Brenda Fricker. The film was followed up with the small film Attracta (1983), and the made-for-television movie The Country Girls (1984), starring Sam Neill.

Kavanagh's next theatrical film was one of the most famous films of his career: the Irish film Cal (1984), starring Helen Mirren and John Lynch. Kavanagh played Skeffington, Cal's superior in the IRA.

Moving on from this film, Kavanagh acted in a number of films and television series. He participated in the thriller The Fantasist (1986), the crime drama Bellman and True (1987), the action film Joyriders (1988), and the independent film 4 Play: In the Border Country (1991), among others.

Kavanagh's career picked up considerably in the mid-nineties. He acted alongside such classic actors as Mia Farrow and Jim Broadbent in the John Irvin film Widows' Peak (1994). Kavanagh then guest-starred in the Sharpe series (starring Sean Bean and Hugh Fraser), where he played the holy man Father Michael Curtis. That same year, he acted in Braveheart (1995) as one of the nobles who routinely changed sides from Scotland to England in the Scottish wars of independence. Kavanagh next acted in Some Mother's Son (1996), a prison film written by Jim Sheridan, and reunited with Brenda Fricker in Pete's Meteor (1998).

After a number of smaller films, Kavanagh acted in another historical epic: the Oliver Stone film Alexander (2004), starring Colin Farrell, Val Kilmer and Anthony Hopkins. Kavanagh played the role of Parmenion, the old general who questions Alexander's actions. After a plot to kill the young leader is foiled, Parmenion is accused of being the mastermind behind it and is murdered. While the film was a triumph overseas, its domestic box office was a fraction of the budget, and it received negative reviews for a number of reasons. After this, Kavanagh acted in Brian De Palma's murder film The Black Dahlia (2006) which failed at the box office.

Kavanagh rebounded with the successful television series The Tudors (2007), starring fellow Alexander cast member Jonathan Rhys Meyers. Kavanagh played Cardinal Campeggio, who presides over the court that is to rule on Henry VIII's petition for an annulment of his marriage to Catherine of Aragon. In 2012 Kavanagh was cast in Michael Hirst's TV series Vikings.

Kavanagh collaborated as vocalist with Paul Brady on the record The Green Crow Caws, a musical celebration of the words of Seán O'Casey.

== Personal life ==
John Kavanagh is the father of actress Rachel Kavanagh and musician Jamie Kavanagh. Kavanagh's sister, Anne Bushnell, was a jazz, blues and cabaret singer.

== Filmography ==
=== Film ===
- 1970: The McKenzie Break – The Police Inspector
- 1982: The Ballroom of Romance – Bowser Egan
- 1984: Cal – Skeffington
- 1995: Braveheart – Craig
- 1997: The Butcher Boy – Doctor Boyd
- 1997: The Informant – IRA Chief
- 1998: Dancing at Lughnasa – Father Carlin
- 1998: This Is My Father
- 2004: Alexander – Parmenion
- 2006: The Black Dahlia
- 2006: The Tiger's Tail – Harry
- 2007: Closing the Ring – Reverend Smith
- 2013: In Secret – Inspector Michaud
- 2013: The Bachelor Weekend – Fionnán's dad
- 2016: Florence Foster Jenkins – Arturo Toscanini
- 2019: Supervized – Windsor
- 2021: Riverdance: The Animated Adventure

=== Television ===
- 1984: Caught in a Free State – Colonel Brian Dillon
- 1985: The Irish R.M. - Canon Crotty
- 1985: The Price – Kearney
- 1987: The Storyteller - episode "A Story Short" - Beggar
- 1991: Children of the North – Seamus Reilly
- 1993: Lovejoy: Irish Stew – Hennessey
- 1995: Sharpe's Sword – Father Curtis
- 1997: Painted Lady - Michael Longley
- 2007–2008: The Tudors – Cardinal Campeggio
- 2008: Inspector George Gently – Doyle
- 2013–2020: Vikings – The Seer & Pope Leo IV
- 2022: Vikings: Valhalla – The Seer
