= Eiléan Ní Chuilleanáin =

Irish poet and academic (born 1942)

- Born: 1942 (age 83–84); Cork, Ireland
- Education: University College Cork; University of Oxford
- Occupations: Poet, academic
- Title: Ireland Professor of Poetry
- Term: 2016–2019
- Spouse: Macdara Woods
- Relatives: Eilís Dillon (mother)
- Writing career
- Language: Irish, English

Eiléan Ní Chuilleanáin (pronounced [əˈlʲeːnˠ n̠ʲiː ˈxɪl̠ʲənˠaːnʲ]; born 1942) is an Irish poet and academic. She was the Ireland Professor of Poetry from 2016 to 2019.

== Biography ==
Ní Chuilleanáin was born in Cork in 1942, the daughter of Eilís Dillon and Professor Cormac Ó Cuilleanáin. She was educated at University College Cork and the University of Oxford. She lived in Dublin with her late husband Macdara Woods; they have one son, Niall Woods.

She is a Fellow of Trinity College Dublin and an emeritus professor of the School of English which she joined in 1966. Her broad academic interests (notably her specialism in Renaissance literature and her interest in translation) are reflected in her poetry. She retired from full-time teaching in 2011 and a selection of her poems are currently on the syllabus for the Leaving Certificate, the final state examination for secondary school students. Ní Chuilleanáin is a member of Aosdána.

Alongside Pearse Hutchinson, Macdara Woods and Leland Bardwell, Ní Chuilleanáin was founding editor at Cyphers literary magazine, which ran from 1975 to 2025. She has contributed several recitations of her poems, including 'Small' (written after the death of Pearse Hutchinson), to the Irish Poetry Reading Archive.

== Awards ==
Ní Chuilleanáin's first collection won the Patrick Kavanagh Poetry Award in 1973. In 2010 The Sun-fish was the winner of the Canadian-based International Griffin Poetry Prize and was shortlisted for the Poetry Now Award. In 2016, she was appointed Ireland Professor of Poetry by the President of Ireland, Michael D. Higgins.

== Publications ==
=== Poetry collections ===
Ní Chuilleanáin publishes with the Gallery Press in Ireland and Wake Forest University Press in the United States.

- 1972: Acts and Monuments, Dublin: The Gallery Press.
- 1975: Site of Ambush, Dublin: The Gallery Press.
- 1977: The Second Voyage, Dublin: The Gallery Press; Winston-Salem, NC: Wake Forest University Press, 1977, 1991.
- 1981: The Rose Geranium, Dublin: The Gallery Press.
- 1986: The Second Voyage, Dublin: The Gallery Press; Newcastle upon Tyne: Bloodaxe Books; Winston-Salem, Wake Forest University Press, 1991.
- 1989: The Magdalene Sermon, Oldcastle: The Gallery Press (shortlisted for the Irish Times/Aer Lingus Award).
- 1994: The Brazen Serpent, Oldcastle: The Gallery Press; Winston-Salem, North Carolina: Wake Forest University Press, 1995.
- 2001: The Girl Who Married the Reindeer, Oldcastle: The Gallery Press; Winston-Salem, North Carolina: Wake Forest University Press, 2002.
- 2008: Selected Poems, Oldcastle: Gallery Press; London: Faber and Faber; Winston-Salem, North Carolina: Wake Forest University Press, 2009.
- 2009: The Sun-fish, Oldcastle: Gallery Press; Winston-Salem, NC: Wake Forest University Press, 2010 (winner of the 2010 International Griffin Poetry Prize).
- 2015: The Boys of Bluehill, Oldcastle: Gallery Press; Winston-Salem, NC: Wake Forest University Press.
- 2020: Collected Poems, Oldcastle: Gallery Press; Winston-Salem, NC: Wake Forest University Press.

=== Translations ===
- 1999: The Water Horse: Poems in Irish by Nuala Ní Dhomhnaill with Translations into English by Medbh McGuckian and Eiléan Ní Chuilleanáin, Oldcastle: The Gallery Press; Winston-Salem, North Carolina: Wake Forest University Press, 2003.
- 2005: Verbale by Michele Ranchetti, translated by Eiléan Ní Chuilleanáin and others, Dublin: Instituto Italiano di Cultura.
- 2005: After the Raising of Lazarus: Poems Translated from the Romanian by Eiléan Ní Chuilleanáin, poems by Ileana Mălăncioiu, Cork: Southword Editions.
- 2010: Contributions in The Word Exchange: Anglo-Saxon Poems in Translation, in Greg Delanty, Michael Matto eds., New York: W. W. Norton & Company.
- 2010: Legend of the Walled Up Wife by Ileana Mălăncioiu, translated from the Romanian by Eiléan Ní Chuilleanáin, Oldcastle: The Gallery Press.

In addition to the above, Ní Chuilleanáin's poetry is widely anthologised.

=== Selected academic writing ===
- 2001: As I Was Among Captives: Joseph Campbell's Prison Diary, 1922-23, Cork: Cork University Press.
- 2003: The Wilde Legacy, ed., Dublin: Four Courts Press.
- 2010: Heresy and Orthodoxy in Early English Literature, 1350-1680, ed., with John Flood, Dublin: Four Courts Press.
- 2009: Translation and Censorship: Patterns of Communication and Interference, ed., with Cormac Ó Cuilleanáin and David Parris, Dublin: Four Courts Press.
- 2013: Translation, Right or Wrong, ed., with Cormac Ó Cuilleanáin and Susana Bayó Belenguer, Dublin: Four Courts Press.

=== Exhibitions ===
- 2024: 'Ireland's Border Culture' Archive at Trinity College Dublin
