= Girl on a Bicycle =

1977 novel by Leland Bardwell

- First edition (publ. Co-op Books)
- Author: Leland Bardwell
- Language: English
- Publication date: 1977

Girl on a Bicycle is a 1977 novel by Leland Bardwell (her first). The novel is set in 1940s Ireland, and deals with the reality of being Protestant and what it means to be an individual caught up in the momentum of historical change. It is a coming-of-age story for Julie Da Vraire as she makes her way on her own after being socially outcast.

== Reception ==
Anthony Burgess (author of A Clockwork Orange) described the novel as "a period gem". Senator David Norris sees the work as the "best Irish big house novel of the 20th century".

Frances Molloy's No Mate for the Magpie, published in 1985, as well as the works of Mary Dorcey and Evelyn Cordon, have been compared to the style of Girl on a Bicycle.

== Publication history ==
- 1977: Dublin: Irish Writers Co-operative. - 160 pages. - OCLC 3770242. - ISBN 978-0-905441-02-3.
- 2009: Dublin: Liberties Press. - 192 pages. - OCLC 428778356. - ISBN 978-1-905483-79-2.

(Chester Springs, Pennsylvania: Dufour Editions - U.S. distributor).
