= Glynn Boyd Harte =

British illustrator, artist and lithographers (1948-2003)

- Born: 28 April 1948
- Died: 16 December 2003 (aged 55)
- Occupation: Illustrator

Glynn Boyd Harte (28 April 1948 – 16 December 2003) was a British artist, illustrator and author.

== Early life and career ==
Harte was born in Rochdale, his father Herbert worked as a commercial artist and later teaching. Harte always maintained that print was in his blood, his grandfather being a printer by trade and his earliest memory being a garden path made from lithograph stones. He was educated at Rochdale Grammar School, before progressing to the Rochdale School of Art. He later transferred to St Martin's School of Art, where tutor Fritz Wegner encouraged him to move from black and white to colour. He would later join the Royal College of Art in 1970 where his tutors were Brian Robb, Edward Bawden, Paul Hogarth and Peter Blake. The artwork at his final show all sold, much to Harte's surprise.

Some of his early exhibited work at the Royal College included Gertrude Stein With Alice B Toklas Wallpaper, Nice: Jetée Promenade Avec Biscuit and Lady Cunard And Pig, which were created by the mix media of images culled from postcards, newspaper photographs and food packaging. His early enthusiasts included Tom Stoppard, who wrote the introduction for Harte's show at the Thumb gallery in 1976:

Living with the drawings, with their confident assertion of shared humours, breeds as much respect as affection

Stoppard would later recall that Harte was dressed

rather like TS Eliot during his Lloyds bank period

when he first met him.

Dring the 1970s, Stoppard was one of Harte's painted portraits, with others sitting for him included actor John Wood, musician Brian Eno, novelist Isobel Strachey, painter Duncan Grant and the American composer Virgil Thomson. Harte would collaborate with filmmaker and publisher Jonathan Gili to produce several books, including "Weekend In Dieppe", "Sardines à l'huile" and a deluxe illustrated version of Betjeman's "Metro-Land". In 1979, he published a collection of lithographs of London's power stations called "Temple of Power", which included an introduction and architectural notes by Gavin Stamp, and a foreword by John Betjeman. Harte also composed music, with his song "Far Horizons" being selected by the painter Paul Hogarth for his Desert Island Discs.

Hatre exhibited regularly, originally with the Francis Kyle Gallery, while it was Curwen Gallery in Fitzrovia being the most recent. His last to big projects was artist-in-residence during the rebuilding of the Royal Opera House, and his paintings of the work in progress were exhibited on the re-opening night in December 1999. He followed this with studies of various millennium projects, exhibited at the Museum of London in 2000. In later life he turned from colour pencils to watercolours and concentrated his work on architecture.

Harte and his wife were active members of the Art Workers' Guild, which Harte was elected in 1978 and to which he was elected Master in 1996.

== Personal life and death ==
In 1971, he married the historian and painter Caroline Bullock, and they had two sons together. He died from Leukaemia at the age of 55.
