= Fritz Wegner =

Austria-born British illustrator

Fritz Wegner (15 September 1924 – 15 March 2015) was an Austrian-born illustrator, resident in the United Kingdom from 1938.

== Early life and exile ==
Fritz Wegner was born in Vienna on 15 September 1924 into a family of assimilated Jews. Following the Anschluss, a drawing he made of Adolf Hitler to amuse his classmates enraged a Nazi-supporting teacher at his school. As a result, he suffered a terrible beating. His parents arranged for the 13-year-old Fritz to leave Austria, alone, in August 1938 for London. They and his sister were later able to join him in exile.

== Education ==
On the strength of a sketch of a man drawn from memory, he was offered a scholarship to St Martin's School of Art at the age of 14, together with accommodation in Hampstead Garden Suburb with the family of one of his tutors, George Mansell, who also taught him English. Wegner paid his way by helping in Mansell's studio.

As Wegner recalled in an interview: “It was an extremely generous thing to do and indeed I lived with them for several years, learning everything I later knew about lettering, penmanship, gilding and the Roman alphabet. That was the start of an early passion, after which I moved on to doing illustrations.” He studied at St. Martins School of Art from 1939 to 1942.

== Career ==
In 1942 he was classified as a "friendly enemy alien" and assigned to war work on the land in Buckinghamshire, gaining further education from his co-workers, mostly conscientious objectors. He also managed to obtain an appointment as a poster artist for the Buckinghamshire War Agricultural Committee. While living in Buckinghamshire he met the journalist Janet Barber, who was living in a nearby village and they were married two years later. He also submitted cartoons to the Evening Star and later became a lodger in London with the editor of the paper's diary column. Establishing himself in London after the war he became a freelance graphic artist.

Wegner began his long career as a freelance illustrator by working for the magazine Lilliput and drawing book jackets for a range of publishers. Hamish Hamilton was the first publishing house to launch him as an illustrator. During a long relationship with the company he worked on book covers and jackets for adult and children's books, and illustrations for a wide range of children's books. He drew the covers for the English editions of The Catcher in the Rye (1951) and Raymond Chandler's The Long Goodbye. He illustrated religious works by Dorothy L. Sayers such as The Story of Noah's Ark (1956), The Story of Adam and Christ (1953), and The Days of Christ's Coming, (1960) in a slightly medieval style. Some of his illustrations for Mordecai Richler's Jacob Two-Two Meets the Hooded Fang (1975) riff off and rework George Cruikshank's illustrations for Oliver Twist.

Working constantly to support a family of three children, Wegner undertook a range of illustration work for John Bull, Puffin Annual, Radio Times, Farmers Weekly, Everywoman, Woman, and Beauty, as well as postage stamps for Christmas and other festivities and, from 1973, a string of drawings for the American children's magazine, Cricket, which featured running commentary by insect characters.

His work is noted for its historical detail and gentle irreverent humour. One of his most reprinted works is his illustrations for Fattypuffs and Thinifers: “It gave me the opportunity to test my invention and humour, the two ingredients I most wanted to bring to my drawings”. Speaking of his creative process in an interview in 2001, Wegner told Tom Morgan-Jones:

"My one regret is that my roughs are very often better than the finished artwork. They’re more spontaneous, they have a greater creative sparkle and you don’t have to worry too much about sizes and all the constraints you normally have to work with."

Wegner developed a collaborative partnership with Allan Ahlberg, particularly after the death of Ahlberg's wife Janet, his co-author and illustrator, in 1994.

Wegner was a visiting lecturer at St Martin's for 25 years from 1969. (2) He taught a younger generation of British illustrators, among them Sara Midda, Linda Kitson, Patrick Benson, Nick Sharratt, Glynn Boyd Harte, Nicola Bayley, George Hardie, and Phillida Gili.

Wegner was twice shortlisted for the Kurt Maschler Award (for a "work of imagination for children, in which text and illustration are integrated so that each enhances and balances the other"), the first time for his illustrations for Michael Rosen's Till Owlyglass, and then for his work for Brian Alderson's The Tale of the Turnip.

== Personal life ==
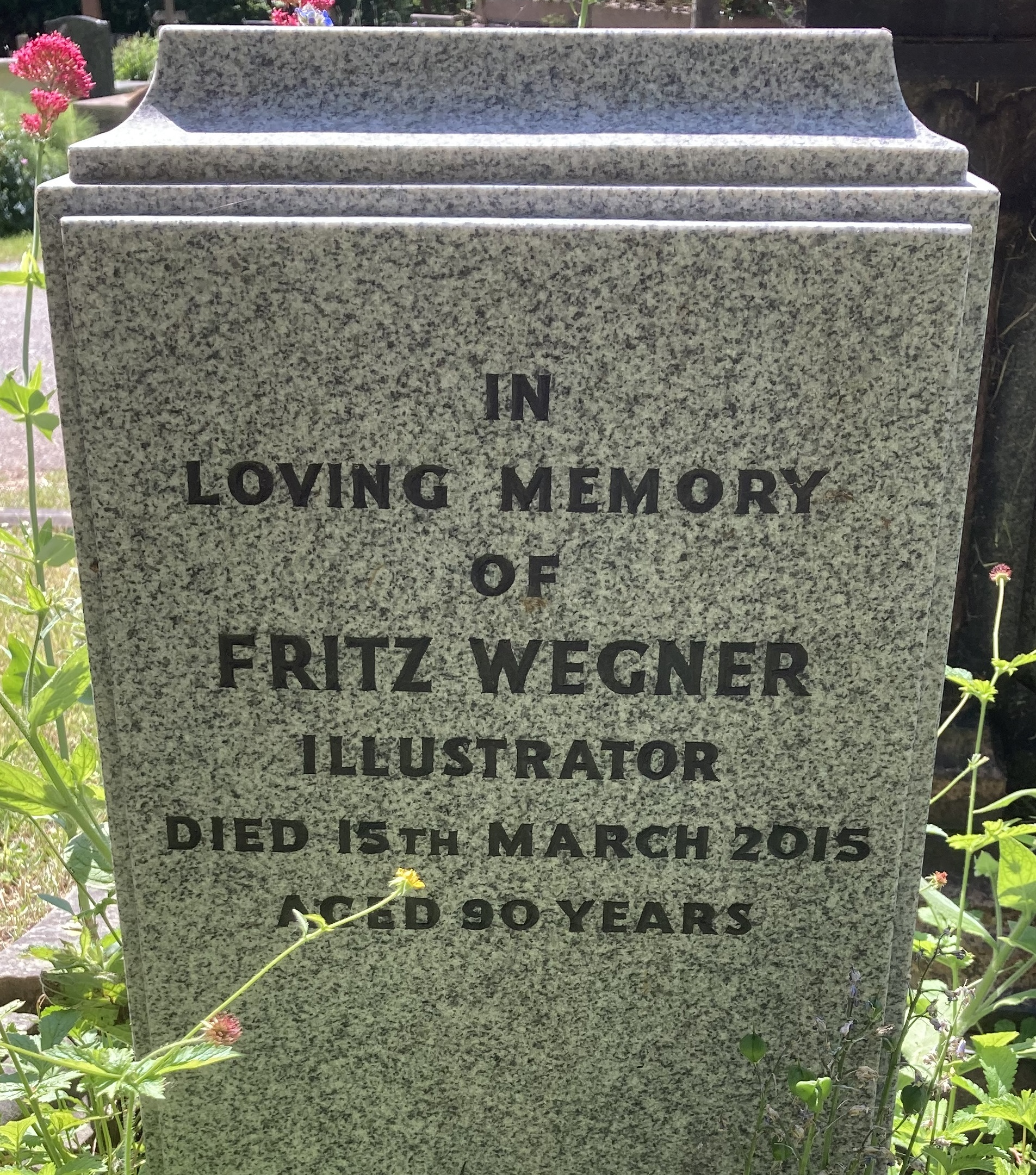
Grave of Fritz Wegner in Highgate Cemetery

Wegner married Janet Barber in 1945, with whom he had a daughter and two sons. His wife and children all survived him. He spent his leisure time painting for pleasure and was a collector of books, paintings, and engravings, as well as of musical instruments and china.

He died on 15 March 2015 and was buried on the eastern side of Highgate Cemetery.

== Bibliography ==
- "The Cats and Rosemary" by Frank Swinnerton (1950)
- "Beginner's Luck" by Oriel Malet (1952)
- "The Story of Adam and Christ" by Dorothy L. Sayers (1953)
- "Enid Blyton's Christmas Story" (1953)
- "The House of the Wind" by Averil Demuth (1953)
- "The funny guy" by Grace Allen Hogarth (1955)
- "The Story of Noah's Ark" by Dorothy L. Sayers (1956
- "The Impractical Chimney-Sweep" by Rosemary Anne Sisson (1956)
- "The Saintmaker's Christmas Eve" by Paul Horgan (1956)
- "Star Girl" by Henry Winterfeld (Translated by Kyrill Schabert) (1957)
- "The Days of Christ's Coming" by Dorothy L. Sayers (1960)
- "The Hamish Hamilton book of princesses" Selected by Sally Patrick Johnson (1963)
- "The Hamish Hamilton Book of Princes" Selected by Christopher Sinclair-Stevenson (1964)
- "Wizards and Witches" by Frances Wilkins (1965)
- "Mother Courage" by Hans Jacob Christoffel von GRIMMELSHAUSEN (Translated by Walter Wallich) (1965)
- "A third French book" by W. F. H. Whitmarsh (1965)
- "Grimm's fairy tales" by Amabel Williams-Ellis (1965)
- "The ghost in the noonday sun" by Sid Fleischman (1966)
- "Baron Munchausen's Marvellous Travels & Adventures" by Raspe R E (translated by Janet Barber) (1967)
- "The House on Fairmount" by William Mayne (1968)
- "Fattypuffs and Thinifers" by André Maurois (1968)
- "Hullabaloo" by Barbara Willard (1969)
- "The great brain" by John D. Fitzgerald (1969)
- "The dribblesome teapots and other incredible stories" by Norman Hunter (1971)
- "Jack the giant-killer" by Joseph Jacobs (1971)
- "The strange affair of Adelaide Harris" by Leon Garfield (1971)
- "Giant Kippernose, and other stories" by John A. Cunliffe (1972)
- "More adventures of the Great Brain" by John D. Fitzgerald" (1972)
- "The story of Snow-White and the Seven Dwarfs" by Jacob Grimm (1973)
- "The voyage of Jim" by Janet Barber (1973)
- "To find a wishing well" by Hylda Lee (1973)
- "The robin and the wren" by Ian Serraillier (1974)
- "The home-made dragon, and other incredible stories" by Norman Hunter (1974)
- "Jacob Two-Two meets the Hooded Fang" by Mordecai Richler (1975)
- "Dust-up at the royal disco, and other incredible stories" by Norman Hunter (1975)
- "More Grimm's fairy tales" by Amabel Williams-Ellis" (1976)
- "The Champion of Merrimack County" by Roger W. Drury (1976)
- "The pleasure garden" by Leon Garfield (1976)
- "Carter is a Painter's cat" by Carolyn Sloan (1979)
- "A Foreign Affair" by John Rowe Townsend (1982)
- "Don't look now but it's Christmas again!" by Fritz Wegner (1983)
- "Guilt and gingerbread" by Leon Garfield (1984)
- "Please Mrs Butler" by Allan Ahlberg (1984)
- "Woof!" by Allan Ahlberg (1986)
- "The sneeze" by David Lloyd (1986)
- "Master Bun the baker's boy" by Allan Ahlberg (1988)
- "Heard it in the playground" by Allan Ahlberg (1989)
- "Till owlyglass" by Michael Rosen (1990)
- "Fritz Wegner's Heaven on Earth" by Fritz Wegner (1992)
- "John Cunliffe's giant stories" by John A. Cunliffe (1994)
- "The giant baby" by Allan Ahlberg (1994)
- "The Better Brown stories" by Allan Ahlberg (1995)
- "The wicked tricks of Till Owlyglass" by Michael Rosen (1997)
- "Ms Cliff the climber" by Allan Ahlberg (1997)
- "The tale of the turnip" by Brian Alderson (1999)
- "Friendly matches" by Allan Ahlberg (2001)
- "My Brother's Ghost" by Allan Ahlberg (2001)
- "The little cat baby" by Allan Ahlberg (2003)
- "The bucket" by Allan Ahlberg (2013)
