= Pearse Hutchinson =

Irish poet, broadcaster and translator

Pearse Hutchinson (16 February 1927 – 14 January 2012) was an Irish poet, broadcaster and translator.

== Childhood and education ==
Hutchinson was born in Glasgow. His father, Harry Hutchinson, a Scottish printer whose own father had left Dublin to find work in Scotland, was Sinn Féin treasurer in Glasgow and was interned in Frongoch in 1919–21. His mother, Cathleen Sara, was born in Cowcaddens, Glasgow, of emigrant parents from County Donegal. She was a friend of Constance Markievicz. In response to a letter from Cathleen, Éamon de Valera found work in Dublin for Harry as a clerk in the Labour Exchange, and later he held a post in the Stationery Office.

Pearse was five years old when the family moved to Dublin, and was the last to be enrolled in St. Enda's School before it closed. He then went to school at the Christian Brothers, Synge Street where he learnt Irish and Latin. Hutchinson was known to write equally well in both Irish and English. One of his close friends there was the poet and literary critic John Jordan. In 1948 he attended University College Dublin where he spent a year and a half, learning Spanish and Italian.

== Travels overseas ==
Having published some poems in The Bell in 1945, his poetic development was greatly influenced by a 1950 holiday in Spain and Portugal. A short stop en route at Vigo brought him into contact for the first time with the culture of Galicia. Later, in Andalusia, he was entranced by the landscape and by the works of the Spanish poets Lorca, Prados and Cernuda: "That early September of 1950," he would later write, "the light walked for me as it never had before, and I walked through the light I'd always longed for".

In 1951 he left Ireland again, determined to go and live in Spain. Unable to get work in Madrid, as he had hoped, he travelled instead to Geneva, where he got a job as a translator with the International Labour Office, which brought him into contact with Catalan exiles, speaking a language then largely suppressed in Spain. An invitation by a Dutch friend led to a visit to the Netherlands, in preparation for which he taught himself Dutch.

He returned to Ireland in 1953, and he became interested in the Irish language poetry of writers such as Piaras Feiritéar and Aonghus Fionn Ó Dálaigh, and published a number of poems in Irish in the magazine Comhar in 1954.

The same year he travelled again to Spain, this time to Barcelona, where he learnt the Catalan and Galician languages, and got to know Catalan poets such as Salvador Espriu and Carles Riba. With the British poet P. J. Kavanagh, he organised a reading of Catalan poetry at the British Institute.

He went home to Ireland in 1957 but returned to Barcelona in 1961, and continued to support Catalan poets. An invitation by the publisher Joan Gili to translate some poems by Josep Carner led to the publication of his first book, a collection of thirty of Carner's poems in Catalan and English, in 1962. A project to publish Hutchinson's translation of Espriu's La Pell de brau (The Bull-skin), fell through some years later. Some of the poems from this project are included in the collection Done into English.

== Return to Ireland ==
In 1963, his first collection of original poems in English, Tongue Without Hands (the title a quotation from the Spanish epic El Cid), was published by Dolmen Press in Ireland. In 1967, having spent nearly ten years altogether in Spain, Hutchinson returned to Ireland, making a living as a poet and journalist writing in both Irish and English. In 1968, a collection of poems in Irish, Faoistin Bhacach (A Lame Confession), was published. Expansions, a collection in English, followed in 1969. Friend Songs (1970) was a new collection of translations, this time of medieval poems originally written in Galaicoportuguese. In 1972 Watching the Morning Grow, a new collection of original poems in English, came out, followed in 1975 by another, The Frost Is All Over.

In October 1971, Hutchinson took up the Gregory Fellowship in Poetry at the University of Leeds, on the recommendation of Professor A. Norman Jeffares. There was some controversy around the appointment following accusations, later retracted, that Jeffares had been guilty of bias in the selection because of their joint Irish heritage. Hutchinson held tenure at the university for three years, and during that time contributed to the university's influential poetry magazine Poetry & Audience; one edition of the magazine, devoted entirely to his poetry, was published as a limited edition.

From 1977 to 1978 he compiled and presented Oró Domhnaigh, a weekly radio programme of Irish poetry, music and folklore for Ireland's national network, RTÉ. He also contributed a weekly column on the Irish language to the station's magazine RTÉ Guide for over ten years. 1981 saw the publication of another translated collection: this time a collaboration with Melita Cataldi, of Old Irish lyrics into Italian. Another collection in English, Climbing the Light (1985), which also included translations from Irish, Italian and Galician, was followed in 1989 by his last Irish collection, Le Cead na Gréine (By Leave of the Sun). The Soul that Kissed the Body (1990) was a selection of his Irish poems translated into English. His most recent English collection was Barnsley Main Seam (1995); the long title poem celebrates the splendours of York Minster and is a homage to the manual workers of the world.

His Collected Poems were published in 2002 to mark his 75th birthday. This was followed in 2003 by Done into English, a selection of many of the translated works he produced over the years; it contains translations of more than sixty poets from over a dozen languages or dialects, including Catalan, Italian, Dutch, Milanese and Irish. 'Every poem in this book has been translated because I liked it', he explained.

A co-editor and founder of the literary journal Cyphers, he received the Butler Award for Irish writing in 1969. He was a member of Aosdána, the state-supported association of artists, from which he received a cnuas (stipend) to allow him to go on writing. He described this as "a miracle and a godsend": "I was fifty-four when I was invited to become a member and frankly I was at the end of my tether. I might have carried on, but I would have been in the gutter because I would have been evicted or I would have gone mad or killed myself or both." A two-day symposium of events was held at Trinity College Dublin, to celebrate his 80th birthday in 2007, with readings from his works by writers including Macdara Woods, Eiléan Ní Chuilleanáin, Paul Durcan and Sujata Bhatt.

In his final collection, At Least for a While (2008), which was shortlisted for the Poetry Now Award, he commented on the replacement of the traditional symbolism of Ireland with the Celtic Tiger: "Music and a small plant/ we had for emblems once./ Better, surely,/ than lion or eagle./ Now our proudest boast/ is a dangerous beast of prey." He lived in Rathgar, Dublin, and died on 14 January 2012.

== Critical opinion ==
Hutchinson's 'unique achievements resist neat classification', writes Michael Kenneally. 'When he writes of privilege and opportunism Hutchinson leaves no aftertaste of self-righteousness'. The Irish Times has described him as 'one of Ireland's most inventive, instructive, and perennially newsworthy poets. ... His poems are often short, they can appear delicate on the page, and they sometimes seem to record glimpses or passing glances, but they always embody and, at their best, articulate Hutchinson's desire for what he once called "true gentleness".'

== Death ==
Pearse Hutchinson died on 14 January 2012, in Dublin, Ireland, aged 84.

== Works ==
- Josep Carner: Poems (Oxford, The Dolphin Press, 1962)
- Tongue Without Hands (Dublin, The Dolmen Press, 1963)
- Faoistin Bhacach (Baile Átha Cliath, An Clóchomhar, 1968)
- Expansions (The Dolmen Press, 1969)
- Watching the Morning Grow (Dublin, The Gallery Press, 1972) ISBN 0-904011-00-3
- The Frost is all Over (The Gallery Press, 1975) ISBN 0-902996-34-7
- Selected Poems (Oldcastle, Co Meath, The Gallery Press, 1980) ISBN 0-904011-28-3
- Climbing the Light (The Gallery Press, 1985) ISBN 0-904011-86-0
- The Soul that Kissed the Body: Selected Poems in Irish with translations into English (Dublin, The Gallery Press, 1990) ISBN 1-85235-060-1
- Le Cead na Gréine, (An Clóchomhar, 1992)
- Barnsley Main seam (The Gallery Press, 1995) ISBN 1-85235-155-1
- Collected Poems (The Gallery Press, 2002) ISBN 1-85235-312-0
- Done Into English: Collected Translations (Dublin, The Gallery Press, 2003) ISBN 1-85235-315-5
- At Least For A While (The Gallery Press, 2008) ISBN 978-1-85235-448-0
- Mooie rode zijden liefde/Beautiful red silk love, bilingual: English/Dutch, translators: Joris Iven and Peter Flynn (Demer Press, ePublisher, Belgium, 1st ed. 2010, 2nd ed. 2012) ISBN 978-90-813070-9-3

== Reviews ==
- Murphy, Hayden (1976), review of The Frost is All Over, in Burnett, Ray (ed.), Calgacus 3, Spring 1976, pp. 55 & 56, ISSN 0307-2029

== Sources ==
- Pearse Hutchinson interview, Poetry Ireland Review, 52nd edition, edited by Liam O Muirthile, 1997.
- Pearse Hutchinson, Introduction, Done Into English, 2003.
- Robert Welch (ed), The Oxford Companion to Irish Literature. Oxford: The Clarendon Press, 1996.
- The Arts Show, RTE Radio 13 December 2007 Interview with Pearse Hutchinson
