= Cecily Brennan =

Irish painter and sculptor

- Born: 1955 (age 70–71); Athenry, Ireland
- Education: National College of Art and Design
- Known for: Painting

Cecily Brennan (born 1955) is an Irish artist who began as a painter but later also produced sculptures. In the 1990s, on behalf of the Irish Department of Foreign Affairs, she chaired the Visual Arts Committee. Her video "Black Tears" (2010), depicting an Irish actress in grief was highlighted in Cork and Dublin galleries.

== Biography ==
Born in 1955 in Athenry in western Ireland, Cecily Brennan studied at the National College of Art and Design, graduating in 1978. Initially working as a painter, her works have been exhibited in the 1980s and 1990s in solo exhibitions at the Project Arts Centre and the Taylor Galleries in Dublin, at Cork's Crawford Art Gallery, and at the Limerick City Gallery. She has also participated in group exhibitions in France, Belgium, the United States and Finland. In the early 2000s, she also produced sculptures, mostly in stainless steel. Some of her sculptural creations were presented at the Taylor Galleries in her "Bandaged Heart" exhibition in 2001.

After becoming a founder member of Dublin's Visual Arts Centre in 1979, Brennan was director of the Project Art Centre from 1983 to 1986. She went on to head the Visual Arts Committee from 1993 to 1997.
