= Jonathan Gili =

Jonathan Gili OBE (19 April 1943 – 1 October 2004) was a British filmmaker, editor and director, who produced numerous and wide-ranging television documentary and features programmes, mostly for the BBC.

== Early life and education ==
Gili was born in Oxford to father Joan Gili, a Catalan publisher and translator, and mother Elizabeth (née McPherson or MacPherson), cookbook author and the daughter of a Scottish-Canadian missionary. He was the brother of the sculptor Katherine Gili. Gili attended Dragon School locally in Oxford, and Bryanston School in north Dorset. He read Greats at New College, Oxford.

== Career ==
Gili began as a freelance film editor. He first directed for the Religious Department of London Weekend Television, but most of his work was made at the BBC in the 1980s and 1990s. Among his most prominent early observational documentaries was the BBC1 film Public School, which featured Westminster School in London, broadcast in late 1979, with huge audience figures and a BAFTA Craft award. There followed a number of highly successful one-off documentaries, including "She Married a Yank" (GI Brides), "To The World's End" (in which the narration consisted entirely of Carl Davis's music), and "The Second Oldest Profession", about salesmen. He contributed three films to the series "Year of the French", including an unforgettable study of a peasant farmer. Then came his many films for "40 Minutes", some of which, such as 'Animal Crackers' and 'The Great North Road' featured Lucinda Lambton. The most memorable of all was "Mixed Blessings", a study of two babies accidentally swapped shortly after birth, and the aftermath for the families.

There followed many documentaries for the "Timewatch" series - histories of the Eiffel Tower, the Empire State Building, The Alaskan Gold Rush, The Oklahoma Outlaw. He worked for nearly two years on a two-part obituary film of Queen Elizabeth, the Queen Mother, narrated by Simon Russell Beale, music by Jonathan Dove, recognised to be the finest of its genre. He was appointed OBE, and received the Grierson Trustees' Award, the top documentary award of the Grierson Trust. (He knew about it, but it was presented posthumously.) "Tales From The Oklahoma Land Runs" won him an award from the Cowboy Hall of Fame.

Gili died from leukemia in 2004, at the age of 61. Leukemia had been diagnosed in 1984, when he was given three years to live. He received experimental treatment from the Hammersmith Hospital and survived 20 years.

Gili did many other things, including publishing books and pictures through his own printing press, Warren Editions. One noted work is a book of Lithographs by Glynn Boyd Harte, based on "Metro-land", the television film by Sir John Betjeman and Edward Mirzoeff.

He was appointed OBE in the 2003 Birthday Honours.
