= Joan Gili =

Catalan antiquarian book-seller, publisher and translator

Joan Gili i Serra (Catalan pronunciation: [ʒuˈaɲ ˈʒili i ˈsɛrə]), also known as John Gili (1907 – 6 May 1998), was a Catalan antiquarian book-seller, publisher and translator.

Joan Gili was born in Barcelona in 1907. His father, Lluis Gili, ran a religious publishing house which also published a cookery book, Sabores, written by his mother, which became a bestseller. While working for his father's company, he developed an interest in English literature, which he wrote about in the Catalan newspaper La Publicitat.

In 1933, he was invited to visit England, and enjoyed the freedom he experienced there so much that he returned in 1934 to live. He opened the Dolphin Bookshop just off Charing Cross Road in London, specialising in Spanish and Latin American books and manuscripts. Some of the manuscripts on Spanish and Catalan history he collected are now in the Houghton Library at Harvard.

He began publishing books himself in 1938. These included textbooks and literary studies, and translations of Miguel de Unamuno, Luis Cernuda, Juan Ramón Jiménez and Pablo Neruda. In 1939, he and Stephen Spender translated a selection of Federico García Lorca's poems, one of the first books to introduce Lorca to an English-speaking audience. In the 1950s, Penguin Books asked him to make prose translations of Lorca's poems; this bilingual edition was a significant influence on several generations of poets and schoolchildren.

A special interest of his was the Catalan language, which at this time was largely suppressed by the Spanish authorities. In 1943, he produced an Introductory Catalan Grammar which long remained in print. He also published translations, many done by himself, of Catalan poets. These included Carles Riba (Poems, 1964; Tankas of the Four Seasons, 1991; Savage Heart, 1993; Bierville Elegies, 1995), Salvador Espriu (Forms and Words, 1980) and Josep Carner (Poems, translated by Pearse Hutchinson, 1962; Nabí, 1996-8). He was a founding member and later president of the Anglo-Catalan Society.

During the Second World War he moved the bookshop to Oxford, where it grew to two floors in a building that had once belonged to the painter Whistler. At first he lived in Park Town in North Oxford. From 1945–69, he lived at 14 Fyfield Road, also in North Oxford, with his family, then moving to Cumnor west of Oxford. In 1948, he became a naturalised British citizen, but although he officially changed his name to John Gili, his friends and family continued to call him Joan.

His role as "unofficial consul of the Catalans in Britain" led eventually to honours, the Creu de Sant Jordi, from the Catalan government, and the Order of Isabella the Catholic from the Spanish government. However, he was reported to be most satisfied by an honorary MA from Oxford University.

He worked until the very end of his life, into his nineties. He married Elizabeth McPherson in 1938. She later produced a translation of his mother's cookery book. They had three children: Jonathan Gili (a documentary filmmaker), Martin Gili (who carried on, and developed Dolphin books), and Katherine Gili (a sculptor).
