= Gallery Press =

Irish literary publishing company

The Gallery Press is an independent Irish publishing company, publishing Irish poetry, drama, and prose by contemporary Irish writers. Founded by poet Peter Fallon as the Gallery Books imprint of Tara Telephone Publications, itself an offshoot of a Beat poetry performance group, it has released more than 500 books by a wide range of artists.

== History ==
Gallery Books began with the release on 6 February 1970 of Answers by Des O'Mahony and Justin McCarthy. Peter Fallon founded the press when he was eighteen years old and has been the editor and publisher for the life of the publisher.

Gallery operated out of a family home in Dublin for many years but now works from a small 19th-century stone house and its adjacent outbuildings, in Loughcrew in the centre of North Meath.

It has been described as the "leading poetry publisher in the Irish Republic".

== Notable writers published by the press ==
- Sara Berkeley
- Ciaran Carson
- Michael Coady
- Gerald Dawe
- Eamon Grennan
- Vona Groarke
- Brian Friel
- Kerry Hardie
- Michael Hartnett
- Seamus Heaney
- Pearse Hutchinson
- Michael Longley
- Medbh McGuckian
- Derek Mahon
- John Montague
- Eiléan Ní Chuilleanáin
