= Macdara Woods =

Irish poet

Macdara Woods (1942 – 15 June 2018) was an Irish poet.

== Biography ==
Woods was born in Dublin, where he attended Gonzaga College and then University College Dublin. He married the poet Eiléan Ní Chuilleanáin. They had one son, Niall, a musician. He lived in Dublin and Umbria. Woods was a founder-editor of the Irish literary magazine Cyphers. He died on 15 June 2018 in St. James's Hospital, aged 76.

== Awards ==
He was elected a member of Aosdána (an organisation established by the Irish Government to honour those who have made an outstanding contribution to the Arts in Ireland) in 1986.

== Publications ==
Poetry collections

- Decimal D. Sec Drinks in a Bar in Marrakesh (1970), New Writers’ Press
- Early Morning Matins (1973), Gallery Press
- The King of the Dead & Other Libyan Tales (1978), Martin, Brian & O’Keeffe
- Stopping the Lights in Ranelagh (1987, reprinted 1988), Dedalus Press
- Miz Moon (1988), Dedalus Press
- The Hanged Man Was Not Surrendering (1990), Dedalus Press
- Notes From the Countries of Blood-Red Flowers (1994), Dedalus Press
- Selected Poems (1996), Dedalus Press
- Knowledge in the Blood, New and Selected Poems (2000, 2007), Dedalus Press
- The Nightingale Water (2001), Dedalus Press
- Artichoke Wine (2006), Dedalus Press
- The Cotard Dimension (2011), Dedalus Press
- Collected Poems (2012), Dedalus Press (in association with the Arts Council of Ireland)
- From Sandymount To The Hill Of Howth (2014) Cyphers, Dublin.
- Music From The Big Tent (2016) Dedalus Press

In Italian:

- Biglietto di Sola Andata (1998) Moby Dick Editrice, Faenza
- Above Pesaro/Con Pesaro ai Miei Piedi (1999) Volumnia Editrice, Perugia

Edited books

- The Kilkenny Anthology (1991), Kilkenny Co. Council.
- (with Jim Vaughan), Present Tense: Words and Pictures (2006), Mayo Co. Council

Woods's work has been translated into many languages. He has collaborated with musicians, notably Brendan Graham (Winter Fire & Snow, performed by Anúna and others), Benjamin Dwyer (In the Ranelagh Gardens), Militia (Above Pesaro/Con Pesaro ai Miei Piedi) and Richard Hartshorne (The Cello Suites).
