= Katherine Gili =

British sculptor (born 1948)

Katherine Gili (born 1948) is a British sculptor. After completing her studies at Bath Academy of Art and St Martin's School of Art, Gili taught at a number of art schools; most notably St Martin's and Norwich between 1972 and 1985.

Her sculpture was exhibited for the first time in 1973 and well over a hundred times since. Gili's career is marked by solo shows in London and New York and by contributions to seminal survey exhibitions at major venues such as the Hayward Gallery. In recent years she has regularly shown in the Royal Academy Summer Exhibitions and notably in 2013 her sculpture "Ripoll" won the Sculpture Prize.

Katherine Gili's work is represented in the Arts Council Collection, Tate and other public and corporate collections in the UK, Switzerland and the USA. Lord Foster selected one of her pieces to stand alongside the Cranfield University Institute of Technology Library which was designed by Foster Associates in 1992.

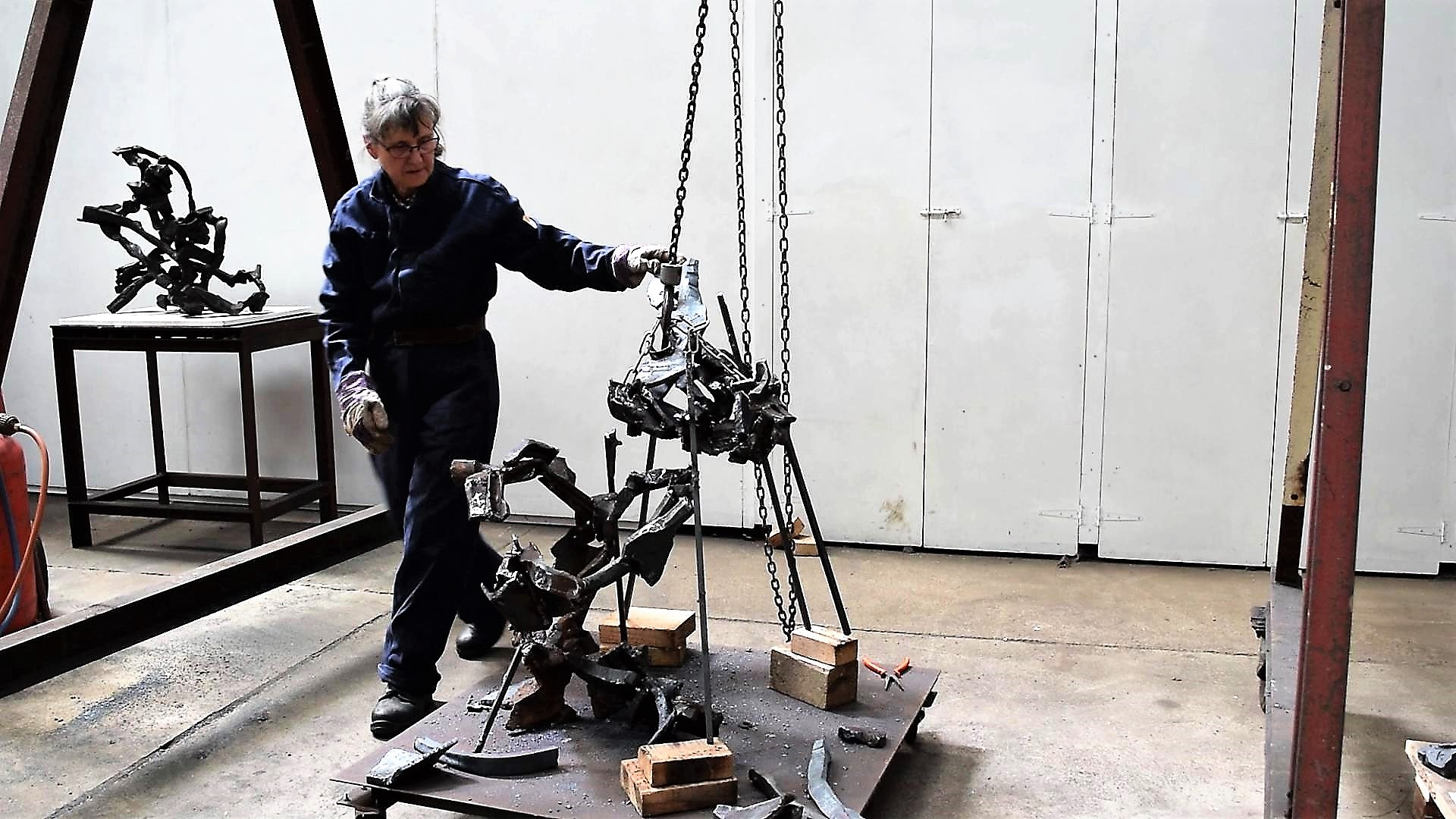
Katherine Gili in her studio, 2017

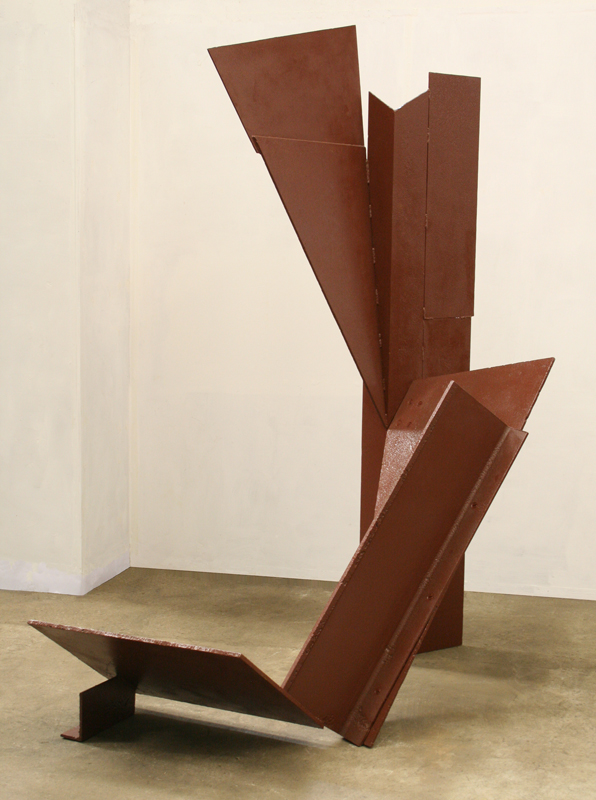
Katherine Gili 'Vertival IV' 1975, Tate Gallery

== Early life ==
Gili was born in Oxford to father Joan Gili, Catalan publisher and translator, and Elizabeth (née McPherson or MacPherson), cookbook author, artist, and the daughter of a Scottish-Canadian missionary. Her brother was filmmaker Jonathan Gili. Gili graduated from Bath Academy of Art in 1970 and then studied for two years at St Martin's School of Art.

== Selected exhibitions ==
=== Solo ===
- Summer Exhibition 2, Selected by Tim Hilton. Serpentine Gallery, Kensington Gardens, London, 1977
- Salander O'Reilly Gallery, New York 1981
- Katherine Gili – A Career Survey; Poussin Gallery 2011
- Artist of the Day, chosen by Jennifer Durrant, Flowers Gallery, London 2014
- Looking for the Physical, Sculpture and Drawings by Katherine Gili, Felix & Spear, London, 2016
- Discovered in the Making, Katherine Gili Sculpture, Felix & Spear, London, 2018
- Sparks Fly, Katherine Gili Sculpture 1974 to 2018, One Canada Square, Canary Wharf, London, 2019

=== Group ===
- The Condition of Sculpture; Hayward Gallery, an international exhibition selected by William Tucker, 1975
- Silver Jubilee Exhibition of Contemporary British Sculpture; Battersea Park 1977
- Annual Stockwell Depot Exhibitions of Painting and Sculpture; 1974–79
- Hayward Annual; 1979
- Have You Seen Sculpture from the Body? Tate Gallery 1984
- Escultura Nueva Reino Unido; Centro Cultural del Conde Duque, Madrid 1988
- Moving Into View: a major display of the Arts Council Collection; South Bank Centre selected by William Packer, 1993
- British Abstract Art, Part 2, Sculpture; Flowers East Gallery, London 1995
- British Figurative Art, Part 2, Sculpture; Flowers East Gallery, London. 1998
- Steel; Canary Wharf, London. 2006
- The Royal Academy Summer Shows 1996, 1997, 2009, 2013, 2014, 2015, 2016

== Awards ==
- Elephant Trust, 1994
- Elected Fellow of the Royal British Society of Sculptors, 1999
- Jack Goldhill Award for Sculpture, Royal Academy, 2013

== Selected Public Collections ==
- Arts Council Collection
- University of Leicester
- City of Lugano Switzerland
- Cartwright Hall, Bradford
- General Electric Corporation, USA
- Henry Moore Institute
- Tate

== Private collections ==
- The Leo and Eileen Herzel Collection USA
- Lord Peter Palumbo collection at Kentuck Knob USA, a house designed by Frank Lloyd Wright
