= Aosdána =

Irish affiliation or academy of creative artists

- Formation: 1981; 45 years ago
- Founder: The Arts Council (of Ireland) (with Taoiseach Charles Haughey from an idea by Anthony Cronin)
- Founded at: Dublin, Ireland
- Type: Academy / artist's association
- Legal status: quango
- Purpose: Association of artists, with provision of financial support to some members
- Professional title: None (some members are designated Saoi or Toscaire)
- Headquarters: Dublin
- Region served: Republic of Ireland
- Members: 248 (max. 250) (2023)
- Official language: English, Irish
- Secretary General: None (administrator delegated from Arts Council)
- Steering: A committee of ten members, the Toscaireacht
- Website: aosdana.artscouncil.ie

Aosdána (/iːsˈdɑːnə/ eess-DAW-nə, Irish: [iːsˠˈd̪ˠaːnˠə]; from aos dána, 'people of the arts') is an Irish association or academy of artists, each of whom must have produced a distinguished body of work of genuine originality. It was created in 1981 by the country's Arts Council on the initiative of a group of writers with support from the Taoiseach (prime minister). Membership, which is by invitation from current members, is limited to 250 individuals; before 2005, it was limited to 200. Its steering body is a committee of ten called the Toscaireacht.

== Formation ==
Aosdána was originally set up by the Arts Council, on the suggestion of writer Anthony Cronin, with support from Charles Haughey, the Taoiseach. Fintan O'Toole said that this served to deflect criticism of Haughey's political actions. The first 89 members were chosen by the Arts Council.

== Membership ==
Members propose new members, with a system of selective voting used to filter applications.

=== Stipend (Cnuas) ===
Some members of Aosdána resident in Ireland receive a stipend, called the Cnuas (pronounced [ˈkn̪ˠuəsˠ], lit. 'collect, store', financial aid from the Arts Council of Ireland intended to allow recipients to work full-time at their art. The value of the Cnuas in 2021 was €20,180 (about £17,000 or US$23,000), having been around €17,000 for some years before that.

=== Honour – Saoi ===
The title of Saoi (lit. "wise one") is a national honour that members of Aosdána can bestow upon a fellow member. No more than seven living members (previously five) can be so honoured at one time. The honour is conferred by the President of Ireland in a ceremony during which a gold torc is placed around the neck of the recipient by the President.

As of February 2025 the Saoithe were:

- Roger Doyle, composer
- Eiléan Ní Chuilleanáin, poet
- Paul Muldoon, poet

Among the deceased holders of the title of Saoi are the Nobel Laureates Samuel Beckett and Seamus Heaney, dramatists Brian Friel and Tom Murphy, novelist Edna O'Brien, filmmaker George Morrison, and the artists Patrick Scott, Louis le Brocquy, and Camille Souter.

== Governance ==
=== Toscaireacht and Assembly ===
The Toscaireacht ("delegation") is a committee of ten members, called Toscairí, of the Aosdána. It meets several times a year to deal with the administration and external relations of Aosdána, reports to every General Assembly, which meets once a year, and sets the assembly's agenda. When new members of Aosdána are proposed, the Toscairí have the task of verifying that the nomination process has been complied with, and also that the candidate is willing to accept membership, before the next stage of election is begun.

=== Toscairí ===
As of 2025, the Toscaireacht members were:

- Cecily Brennan (Chair) (Visual Arts)
- John Scott (Choreography)
- Evelyn Conlon (Literature)
- Jimmy Murphy (Literature)
- Peter Sirr (Literature)
- John McLachlan (Music)
- Gráinne Mulvey (Music)
- Amanda Coogan (Visual Arts)
- Eithne Jordan (Visual Arts)
- Mick O'Dea (Visual Arts)

== See also ==
- List of members of Aosdána
