= 1997 in poetry =

Nationality words link to articles with information on the nation's poetry or literature (for instance, Irish or France).

== Events ==
- January 20 — Miller Williams of Arkansas reads his poem, "Of History and Hope," at President Clinton's inauguration.
- Regeneration (titled Behind the Lines in the United States), a film about World War I poets Wilfred Owen and Siegfried Sassoon, is released. It is based on the novel Regeneration by Pat Barker.
- Jacket online literary magazine founded.

== Works published in English ==
Listed by nation where the work was first published and again by the poet's native land, if different; substantially revised works listed separately:

=== Canada ===
- Michael Barnholden, On the Ropes (Coach House Books) ISBN 978-1-55245-002-4
- Dionne Brand, Land to Light On
- Clint Burnham, Be Labour Reading (ECW Press) ISBN 978-1-55022-344-6
- Kwame Dawes, editor, Wheel and Come again: An Anthology of Reggae Poetry, Fredericton, New Brunswick: Goose Lane.
- Louis Dudek, The Caged Tiger. Montreal: Empyreal Press.
- John Glassco, Selected Poems with Three Notes on the Poetic Process. Ottawa: Golden Dog Press)
- Elisabeth Harvor, The Long Cold Green Evenings of Spring
- Roy Kiyooka, Pacific Windows: The Collected Poems of Roy Kiyooka (posthumous), edited by Roy Miki
- A.M. Klein, Selected Poems. Selected Poems Seymour Mayne, Zailig Pollock, Usher Caplan ed. Toronto: U of Toronto P, 1997. ISBN 0-8020-0734-1 ISBN 0802077536
- Laura Lush:
  - Darkening In, Montreal: Véhicule Press
  - Fault Line, Montreal: Véhicule Press
- Don McKay, Apparatus
- George McWhirter, Incubus: The Dark Side of the Light
- John Reibetanz:
  - Midland Summer
  - Near Finisterre

=== India, in English ===
- R. Parthasarathy Rough Passage ( Poetry in English ). New Delhi: Oxford University Press, India 1977. ISBN 0-19-560690-6
- Jeet Thayil, Apocalypso ( Poetry in English ), London: Aark Arts, 1997, ISBN 1-899179-01-1
- Sudeep Sen, Postmarked India: New & Selected Poems ( Poetry in English ), New Delhi: HarperCollins, ISBN 81-7223-269-1
- Eunice de Souza, editor, Nine Indian Women Poets, New Delhi: Oxford University Press, ISBN 0-19-564077-2
- Svami Bhumananda Sarasvati, editor and translator, Anthology of Vedic Hymns: Being a Collection of Hymns from the Four Vedas, Sahibabad, Ghaziabad: Kusum Lat Arya Pratishthan, India.

=== Ireland ===
- Moya Cannon, The Parchment Boat, Oldcastle: The Gallery Press, ISBN 978-1-85235-201-1
- Michael Coady, All Souls (poems and prose), Oldcastle: The Gallery Press, ISBN 978-1-85235-212-7
- Aidan Murphy, Stark Naked Blues, New Island Books, ISBN 978-1-874597-67-4
- William Wall, Mathematics And Other Poems, Collins Press, Cork ISBN 1-898256-26-8

=== New Zealand ===
- Fleur Adcock, Looking Back, Oxford and Auckland: Oxford University Press (New Zealand poet who moved to England in 1963)
- Jenny Bornholdt, Gregory O'Brien, and Mark Williams, editors, An Anthology of New Zealand Poetry in English, Auckland: Oxford University Press New Zealand (anthology)
- Jenny Bornholdt, Miss New Zealand: Selected Poems
- Diane Brown, Before The Divorce We Go To Disneyland, Tandem Press
- Alan Brunton, Years Ago Today, documentary essay on poetry in the 1960s, Bumper Books
- Allen Curnow, Early Days Yet: New and Collected Poems 1941-1997
- Kendrick Smithyman, Atua Wera, Auckland: Auckland University Press, posthumous
- Paula Green, Cookhouse, Auckland University Press

=== United Kingdom ===
- Fleur Adcock, Looking Back, Oxford and Auckland: Oxford University Press (New Zealand poet who moved to England in 1963)
- Simon Armitage, CloudCuckooLand (sic.)
- Charles Causley, Collected Poems (see also Collected Poems 1975)
- Gillian Clarke, Collected Poems, Carcanet Press, ISBN 1-85754-335-1
- Elaine Feinstein, Daylight, Carcanet
- Lavinia Greenlaw, A World Where News Travelled Slowly, Faber and Faber
- Ted Hughes, Tales from Ovid; a New York Times "notable book of the year" for 1998
- Elizabeth Jennings, In the Meantime
- Jamie McKendrick, The Marble Fly
- Anne MacLeod, Standing by Thistles (Scottish poet)
- Derek Mahon, The Yellow Book. Gallery Press
- Andrew Motion, Salt Water
- Sean O'Brien, The Ideology (Smith/Doorstep)
- Don Paterson, God's Gift to Women
- Peter Reading, Work in Regress
- Peter Redgrove:
  - Orchard End
  - What the Black Mirror Saw: New Short Fiction and Prose Poetry
- Robin Robertson, A Painted Field
- Labi Siffre, Monument
- Anthony Thwaite, Selected Poems 1956–1996
- Charles Tomlinson, Selected Poems 1955–1997

==== Anthologies in the United Kingdom ====
- Thomas Rain Crowe with Gwendal Denez and Tom Hubbard, Writing the Wind: A Celtic resurgence: The New Celtic Poetry: Welsh, Breton, Irish Gaelic, Scottish Gaelic, Cornish, Manx, Cullowhee, NC: New Native Press
- Michael Donaghy, Andrew Motion, Hugo Williams, poets in Penguin Modern Poets 11, Penguin
- Iona Opie and Peter Opie, The Oxford Dictionary of Nursery Rhymes, Oxford: Oxford University Press

==== Criticism, scholarship, and biography in the United Kingdom ====
- R. F. Foster, W. B. Yeats: A Life, Vol. I: The Apprentice Mage, Oxford University Press ISBN 0-19-288085-3

=== United States ===
- Kim Addonizio, Jimmy & Rita (BOA Editions) 1997
- Agha Shahid Ali, The Country Without a Post Office (Indian-born poet of Kashmiri heritage)
- Dick Allen, Ode to the Cold War: Poems New and Selected (Sarabande)
- A.R. Ammons, Glare
- Marvin Bell, Ardor (The Book of the Dead Man, Volume 2) (Copper Canyon Press)
- Wendell Berry, Entries (Washington, D.C.: Counterpoint)
- Frank Bidart, Desire (Farrar, Straus and Giroux), received the Theodore Roethke Memorial Poetry Prize and the 1998 Bobbitt Prize for Poetry; nominated for the Pulitzer Prize, the National Book Award, and the National Book Critics Circle Award
- Allison Hedge Coke, [Dog Road Woman (Coffee House Press), "American Book Award"
- Alfred Corn, Present (Washington: Counterpoint Press)
- Tess Gallagher, At the Owl Woman Saloon (Scribner), a New York Times "notable book of the year"
- Amy Clampitt, The Collected Poems of Amy Clampitt (Knopf), published posthumously, a New York Times "notable book of the year"
- Jorie Graham, The Errancy: Poems (Ecco), a New York Times "notable book of the year"
- Beth Gylys, Balloon Heart (Wind Publications), Winner of the Quentin R. Howard Award.
- Robert Fagles (translator), The Odyssey by Homer (Viking), a New York Times "notable book of the year"
- Susan Hahn, Confession (University of Chicago Press)
- Anthony Hecht and John Hollander, Jiggery-Pokery: A Compendium of Double Dactyls
- Paul Hoover, Viridian (University of Georgia Press)
- Fanny Howe, One Crossed Out
- Jane Kenyon, Otherwise: New and Selected Poems (Graywolf), a New York Times "notable book of the year"
- Maxine Kumin, Selected Poems, 1960-1990 (Norton), a New York Times "notable book of the year"
- Robert Hass, Sun Under Wood: New Poems (Ecco), a New York Times "notable book of the year"
- John Hollander, The Work of Poetry (Columbia University Press)
- Maxine Kumin, Selected Poems, 1960-1990 (W.W. Norton)
- Philip Levine, Unselected Poems (Greenhouse Review Press)
- Sarah Lindsay, Primate Behavior (Grove Press), National Book Award finalist
- William Meredith, Effort at Speech: New and Selected Poems
- W. S. Merwin, Flower and Hand: Poems, 1977-1983 (Port Townsend, Washington: Copper Canyon Press)
- Howard Nemerov, The Collected Poems of Howard Nemerov (which wins the Pulitzer Prize for Poetry, the National Book Award, and the Bollingen Prize)
- Mary Oliver, West Wind: Poems and Prose Poems
- Carl Rakosi, The Earth Suite 1997
- Kenneth Rexroth, Sacramental Acts: The Love Poems
- Rosmarie Waldrop, Another Language: Selected Poems (Talisman House)
- C. K. Williams, The Vigil (Farrar Straus), nominated for the National Book Critics Circle Award
- David Wojahn, The Falling Hour (University of Pittsburgh Press)
- Charles Wright, BlackZodiac (Farrar Straus)

==== Criticism, scholarship, and biography in the United States ====
- Kim Addonizio and Dorianne Laux, The Poet's Companion: A Guide to the Pleasures of Writing Poetry
- Joseph Blotner, Robert Penn Warren: A Biography. (Random House), one of The New York Times "notable books of the year"
- Bonnie Costello, Celeste Goodridge and Cristanne Miller, editors, The Selected Letters of Marianne Moore (Knopf), one of The New York Times "notable books of the year"
- Angela Davis, Blues Legacies and Black Feminism: Gertrude "Ma" Rainey, Bessie Smith, and Billie Holiday, 1997 American Book Award
- Phyllis Grosskurth, Byron: The Flawed Angel (Peter Davison/Houghton Mifflin), one of The New York Times "notable books of the year"
- Douglas Hofstadter, Le Ton Beau de Marot: In Praise of the Music of Language (Basic Books) "ruminations on the art of translation" with a 16th-century French poem as the prime example, one of The New York Times "notable books of the year"
- John Hollander, The Work of Poetry (criticism)
- Sam McCready, A William Butler Yeats Encyclopedia, Greenwood Press (scholarship)
- Nicholas Murray, A Life of Matthew Arnold (Thomas Dunne/St. Martin's), one of The New York Times "notable books of the year"
- Helen Vendler, The Art of Shakespeare's Sonnets (Belknap/Harvard University), one of The New York Times "notable books of the year"

==== Anthologies in the United States ====
- Harold Bloom edits The Best of the Best American Poetry 1988-1997
- Ross and Kathryn Petras, editors, Very Bad Poetry (Vintage)

===== The Best American Poetry 1997 =====
Poems from these 75 poets are in The Best American Poetry 1997, edited by David Lehman, guest editor James Tate:

- Ai
- Sherman Alexie
- Agha Shahid Ali
- A. R. Ammons
- Nin Andrews
- L. S. Asekoff
- Leevester Clay
- John Ashbery
- Marianne Boruch
- Catherine Bowman
- Joseph Brodsky
- Stephanie Brown
- Joshua Clover
- Billy Collins
- Gillian Conoley
- Jayne Cortez
- Robert Creeley
- Carl Dennis
- William Dickey
- Robert Dow
- Thomas Sayers Ellis
- Irving Feldman
- Herman Fong
- Dick Gallup
- Martin Galvin
- Amy Gerstler
- Allen Ginsberg
- Dana Gioia
- Elton Glaser
- Kate Gleason
- Albert Goldbarth
- Jorie Graham
- Donald Hall
- Daniel Halpern
- Robert Hass
- Bob Hicok
- Paul Hoover
- Christine Hume
- Harry Humes
- Don Hymans
- Lawson Fusao Inada
- Richard Jackson
- Gray Jacobik
- George Kalamaras
- Jennifer L. Knox
- Philip Kobylarz
- Yusef Komunyakaa
- Elizabeth Kostova
- Denise Levertov
- Larry Levis
- Matthew Lippman
- Beth Lisick
- Khaled Mattawa
- William Matthews
- Josip Novakovich
- Geoffrey Nutter
- Catie Rosemurgy
- Clare Rossini
- Mary Ruefle
- Hillel Schwartz
- Maureen Seaton
- Vijay Seshadri
- Steven Sherrill
- Charles Simic
- Charlie Smith
- Leon Stokesbury
- Mark Strand
- Jack Turner
- Karen Volkman
- Derek Walcott
- Rosanna Warren
- Lewis Warsh
- Terence Winch
- Eve Wood
- Charles Wright
- Dean Young

=== Other in English ===
- Margaret Avison, Not Yet but Still, Australia

== Works published in other languages ==
Listed by nation where the work was first published and again by the poet's native land, if different; substantially revised works listed separately:

=== French language ===
==== France ====
- Olivier Barbarant, Aragon: la mémoire et l'excès, publisher: Editions Champ Vallon, ISBN 978-2-87673-226-1
- Yves Bonnefoy, L'Encore Aveugle,
- Seyhmus Dagtekin, Artères-solaires, publisher: L'Harmattan; Kurdish Turkish poet writing in French, living in and published in France

==== Canada, in French ====
- Suzanne Jacob, La part de feu, Montréal: Boréal, winner of the prix de la Société Radio-Canada, and prix du Gouverneur général
- Pierre Nepveu, Romans-fleuves, Montréal: Le Noroît

=== Hebrew ===
- Aharon Shabtai, Be-xodesh May ha-nifla’ ("In the Wonderful Month of May")
- Rami Saari, Maslul Ha-k'ev Ha-no"az ("The Route of the Bold Pain")

=== India ===
In each section, listed in alphabetical order by first name:

==== Bengali ====
- Joy Goswami, Kabita-Songroho, Vol. 2, Kolkata: Ananda Publishers, ISBN 81-7215-750-9 (third reprint in 2002)
- Nirendranath Chakravarti, Shondharaater Kobita, Kolkata: Ananda Publishers
- Udaya Narayana Singh, Ashru o Parihaas, Kolkata: Pritoniya
- Subrata Bandyopadhyay, Saodāgara o The final judgement ("Saudagar and the Final Judgement"), Kalakata: De'ja Pābaliśiṃ

==== Other in India ====
- Jiban Narah, Dhou Khela Loralir San, Guwahati, Assam: Nibedon; Indian, Assamese-language
- Jayant Kaikini, Neelimale, Bangalore: Patrike Prakashana, Indian, Kannada-language poet, short-story writer, and screenwriter
- K. G. Sankara Pillai, K.G. Shankara Pillayude Kavithakal 1969-1996, Kottayam, Kerala: D C Books; Malayalam-language
- K. Siva Reddy, Naa Kalala Nadi Anchuna, Hyderabad: Jhari Poetry Circle; Telugu-language
- Kanaka Ha Ma, Papanashini, Puttur, Karnataka: Kannada Sangha; Kannada language
- Namdeo Dhasal, Andhale Shatak, Mumbai: Ambedkara Prabodhini; Marathi-language

=== Poland ===
- Stanisław Barańczak, Zimy i podroze ("Winter and Journeys"), Krakow: Wydawnictwo Literackie
- Ewa Lipska, Ludzie dla poczatkujacych, ("People for Beginners"); Poznan: a5
- Tomasz Różycki, Vaterland, Łódź: Stowarzyszenie Literackie im. K.K. Baczyńskiego
- Piotr Sommer, Nowe stosunki wyrazów. Wiersze z lat siedemdziesiątych i osiemdziesiątych
- Wisława Szymborska: Sto wierszy - sto pociech ("100 Poems - 100 Happinesses")
- Eugeniusz Tkaczyszyn-Dycki, Liber mortuorum

=== Spain ===
- Matilde Camus, Mundo interior ("Inner World")

=== Other ===
- Mario Benedetti, La vida ese paréntesis, Uruguay
- Attilio Bertolucci, La lucertola di Casarola, previously unpublished poems, many written in his youth; Italy
- Christoph Buchwald, general editor, and Ror Wolf, guest editor, Jahrbuch der Lyrik 1997/98 ("Poetry Yearbook 1997/98"), publisher: Beck; anthology
- Chen Kehua, Bie ai moshengren ("Don’t Make Love to Strangers") Chinese (Taiwan)
- Alexander Mezhirov:
  - Позёмка ("Drifting"), Russia
  - Apologii︠a︡ t︠s︡irka: kniga novykh stikhov ("Apologia of the Circus"), including a version of "Blizzard", St. Petersburg, Russia
- Wang Xiaoni, Wode zhili baozhe wo de huo ("My paper wraps my fire"), China

== Awards and honors ==
=== Australia ===
- C. J. Dennis Prize for Poetry: Les Murray, Subhuman Redneck Poems
- Dinny O'Hearn Poetry Prize: Joint winners
  - Dragons in their Pleasant Places by Peter Porter
  - The Wild Reply by Emma Lew
- Kenneth Slessor Prize for Poetry: Anthony Lawrence, The Viewfinder
- Mary Gilmore Prize: Emma Lew - The Wild Reply

=== Canada ===
- Gerald Lampert Award: Marilyn Dumont, A Really Good Brown Girl
- Archibald Lampman Award: Diana Brebner, Flora & Fauna
- 1997 Governor General's Awards: Dionne Brand, Land to Light On (English); Pierre Nepveu, Romans-fleuves (French)
- Pat Lowther Award: Marilyn Bowering, Autobiography
- Prix Alain-Grandbois: Claude Beausoleil, Grand hôtel des étrangers
- Dorothy Livesay Poetry Prize: Margo Button, The Unhinging of Wings
- Prix Émile-Nelligan: Patrick Lafontaine, L’Ambition du vide

=== India ===
- Sahitya Akademi Award : Leeladhar Jagudi for Anubhav Ke Aakash Mein Chaand
- Poetry Society India National Poetry Competition : Ranjit Hoskote for Portrait of a Lady

=== New Zealand ===
- Montana New Zealand Book Awards, First Book Award for Poetry: Diane Brown, Before the Divorce We Go To Disneyland, Tandem Press

=== United Kingdom ===
- Cholmondeley Award: Alison Brackenbury, Gillian Clarke, Tony Curtis, Anne Stevenson
- Eric Gregory Award: Matthew Clegg, Sarah Corbett, Polly Clark, Tim Kendall, Graham Nelson, Matthew Welton
- Forward Poetry Prize Best Collection: Jamie McKendrick, The Marble Fly (Oxford University Press)
- Forward Poetry Prize Best First Collection: Robin Robertson, A Painted Field (Picador)
- T. S. Eliot Prize (United Kingdom and Ireland): Don Paterson, God's Gift to Women
- Whitbread Award for poetry and book of the year: Ted Hughes, Tales from Ovid
- National Poetry Competition : Neil Rollinson for The Constellations

=== United States ===
- Agnes Lynch Starrett Poetry Prize: Richard Blanco, City of a Hundred Fires
- Aiken Taylor Award for Modern American Poetry: Fred Chappell
- American Academy of Arts and Letters Gold Medal in Poetry, John Ashbery
- AML Award for poetry to Susan Elizabeth Howe for Stone Spirits
- Bernard F. Connors Prize for Poetry: John Drury, "Burning the Aspern Papers"
- Bollingen Prize: Gary Snyder
- National Book Award for poetry: William Meredith, Effort at Speech: New & Selected Poems
- Poet Laureate Consultant in Poetry to the Library of Congress: Robert Pinsky appointed
- Pulitzer Prize for Poetry: Lisel Mueller: Live Together: New and Selected Poems
- Rhysling Award:
  - Terry A. Garey, Spotting UFOs While Canning Tomatoes (Long Form)
  - W. Gregory Stewart, Day Omega (Short Form)
- Ruth Lilly Poetry Prize: William Matthews
- Wallace Stevens Award: Anthony Hecht
- Whiting Awards: Connie Deanovich, Forrest Gander, Jody Gladding, Mark Turpin
- Fellowship of the Academy of American Poets: John Haines
- North Carolina Poet Laureate: Fred Chappell appointed.

== Deaths ==
Birth years link to the corresponding "[year] in poetry" article:

- January 19 – James Dickey, 73 (born 1923), American
- April 5 – Allen Ginsberg, 70 (born 1926), of liver cancer, American
- April 27 – Dulce María Loynaz, 94 (born 1902), Cuban
- May 15 – Laurie Lee, 82, English poet, novelist and screenwriter
- August 27 – Johannes Edfelt, 92, Swedish
- October 19 – Stella Sierra, 80, (born 1917), Panamanian
- November 12:
  - James Laughlin, 83, American poet, publisher and man of letters
  - William Matthews, 55, American poet and essayist, of a heart attack
- November 17 – David Ignatow, 83, American poet
- November 30 – Kathy Acker, 53, American postmodernist experimental novelist and punk poet
- December 13 – Claude Roy, pen name of Claude Orland (born 1915), French poet, novelist, essayist, art critic and journalist; an activist in the Communist Party until his expulsion in 1956
- December 20 – Denise Levertov, 74, of lymphoma

== See also ==
- Poetry
- List of years in poetry
- List of poetry awards
