= The Best American Poetry 1997 =

The Best American Poetry 1997, a volume in The Best American Poetry series, was edited by David Lehman and by guest editor James Tate.

== Poets and poems included ==
Poet	Poem	Where poem previously appeared
Ai	"Back in the World"	Quarterly West
Sherman Alexie	"The Exaggeration of Despair"	Urbanus
Agha Shahid Ali	"Return to Harmony 3"	Verse
A. R. Ammons	from "Strip"	The Paris Review
Nin Andrews	"That Cold Summer"	Ploughshares
L. S. Asekoff	"Rounding the Horn"	American Poetry Review
John Ashbery	"The Problem of Anxiety"	Arshile
Marianne Boruch	"Camouflage"	Shenandoah
Catherine Bowman	"No Sorry"	TriQuarterly
Joseph Brodsky	"Love Song"	The New Republic
Stephanie Brown	"Feminine Intuition"	American Poetry Review
Joshua Clover	"The Map Room"	Iowa Review
Billy Collins	"Lines Lost Among Trees "	Poetry
Gillian Conoley	"The Sky Drank In"	American Letters & Commentary
Jayne Cortez	"The Heavy Headed Dance"	Hanging Loose
Robert Creeley	"Won't It Be Fine?"	Grand Street
Carl Dennis	"History"	The New Republic
William Dickey	"The Death of John Berryman"	Poetry
Robert Dow	"How Should I Say This?"	The Massachusetts Review
Thomas Sayers Ellis	"Atomic Bride"	Ploughshares
Irving Feldman	"You Know What I'm Saying?"	Poetry
Herman Fong	"Asylum"	The Gettysburg Review
Dick Gallup	"Backing into the Future"	The World
Martin Galvin	"Introductions"	Poetry
Amy Gerstler	"A Fan Letter"	American Poetry Review
Allen Ginsberg	"Is About"	The New Yorker
Dana Gioia	"The Litany"	The Hudson Review
Elton Glaser	"Smoking"	Shenandoah
Kate Gleason	"After Fighting for Hours"	Green Mountains Review
Albert Goldbarth	"Complete with Starry Night and Bourbon Shots"	Quarterly West
Jorie Graham	"Thinking"	The New Republic
Donald Hall	"The Porcelain Couple"	The New Yorker
Daniel Halpern	"Her Body"	Ploughshares
Robert Hass	"Interrupted Meditation"	Colorado Review
Bob Hicok	"Heroin"	Indiana Review
Paul Hoover	"California"	The New Republic
Christine Hume	"Helicopter Wrecked on a Hill"	Denver Quarterly
Harry Humes	"The Butterfly Effect"	The Gettysburg Review
Don Hymans	"Passacaglia"	Colorado Review
Lawson Fusao Inada	"Making It Stick"	Many Mountains Moving
Richard Jackson	"The Poem That Was Once Called "Desperate"; But Is Now Striving to Become the Perfect Love Poem"	North American Review
Gray Jacobik	"Dust Storm"	Ploughshares
George Kalamaras	"Mud"	New Letters
Jennifer L. Knox	"The Bright Light of Responsibility"	Exquisite Corpse (magazine)
Philip Kobylarz	"A Bill, Posted"	Poetry
Yusef Komunyakaa	"Jeanne Duval's Confession"	Black Warrior Review
Elizabeth Kostova	"Suddenly I Realized I Was Sitting"	Another Chicago Magazine
Denise Levertov	"The Change"	Seneca Review
Larry Levis	"Anastasia and Sandman"	American Poetry Review
Matthew Lippman	"Hallelujah Terrible"	Seneca Review
Beth Lisick	"Empress of Sighs"	Clockwatch Review
Khaled Mattawa	"Heartsong"	Ploughshares
William Matthews	"Vermin"	The New Yorker
Josip Novakovich	"Shadow"	Another Chicago Magazine
Geoffrey Nutter	from "A Summer Evening"	Denver Quarterly
Catie Rosemurgy	"Mostly Mick Jagger"	Cream City Review
Clare Rossini	"Valediction"	Poetry
Mary Ruefle	"Topophilia"	American Poetry Review
Hillel Schwartz	"Recruiting Poster"	Shenandoah
Maureen Seaton	"Fiddleheads"	Green Mountains Review
Vijay Seshadri	"Lifeline"	The Paris Review
Steven Sherrill	"Katyn Forest"	Another Chicago Magazine
Charles Simic	"The Something"	The New Yorker
Charlie Smith	"Beds"	Poetry
Leon Stokesbury	"Evening's End"	The Kenyon Review
Mark Strand	"Morning, Noon and Night"	The Times Literary Supplement
Jack Turner	"The Plan"	Poetry
Karen Volkman	"Infernal"	Chelsea
Derek Walcott	"Italian Eclogues"	The New York Review of Books
Rosanna Warren	"Diversion"	The New Republic
Lewis Warsh	"Downward Mobility"	The World
Terence Winch	"Shadow Grammar"	The World
Eve Wood	"Recognition"	Santa Monica Review
Charles Wright	"Disjecta Membra"	American Poetry Review
Dean Young	"Frottage"	The Gettysburg Review

== See also ==
- 1997 in poetry

Connie Hart The heart is forever
