= 1991 in poetry =

Nationality words link to articles with information on the nation's poetry or literature (for instance, Irish or France).

== Events ==
- Forward Poetry Prize created
- Dana Gioia, writing in The Atlantic Monthly suggests (in an article titled "Can Poetry Matter?") that poets recite the works of other poets at public readings.
- Joseph Brodsky, the United States poet laureate, suggests in The New Republic that an anthology of American poetry be put beside the Bible and telephone directory in every hotel room in the country.

== Works published in English ==
Listed by nation where the work was first published and again by the poet's native land, if different; substantially revised works listed separately:

=== Australia ===
- Les Murray, The Rabbiter's Bounty

==== Anthologies in Australia ====
- Philip Mead and John Tranter, The Penguin Book of Modern Australian Poetry a major anthology of Twentieth century poetry from that nation
- Les Murray, editor, The New Oxford Book of Australian Verse (editor), Melbourne, Oxford University Press, 1986 and Oxford, Oxford University Press, 1991, 1999

=== Canada ===
- Margaret Avison, Selected Poems Canada
- Earle Birney, Last Makings: Poems. Toronto: McClelland & Stewart.
- Don Domanski, Wolf-Ladder (nominated for a Governor General's Award)
- Jeffery Donaldson, Once out of Nature, McClelland & Stewart.
- Louis Dudek, Europe. Erin, ON: Porcupine's Quill, 1991.
- Louis Dudek, Small Perfect Things. Montreal: DC Books.
- Robert Finch, Miracle at the Jetty. Port Rowan, ON: Leeboard Press.
- Dorothy Livesay, The Woman I Am. Montreal: Guernica.
- Laura Lush, Hometown, Montreal: Vehicle Press.
- Anne Marriott, Aqua, Toronto: Wolsak & Wynn.
- Don McKay, Night Field (Canada)
- Roy Miki, In Saving Face: Poems Selected, 1976-1988, Canada
- P. K. Page, The Glass Air: Selected Poems (an expanded edition; original edition published in 1985)
- John Pass, The Hour's Acropolis, shortlisted for the 1993 Dorothy Livesay Poetry Prize, ISBN 1-55017-043-0
- Raymond Souster, Running Out the Clock. Ottawa: Oberon Press.
- George Woodcock, Tolstoy at Yasnaya Polyana & other Poems, Kingston: Quarry Press, Canada

=== India, in English ===
- Gieve Patel, Mirrored, Mirroring ( Poetry in English ), Oxford University Press, New Delhi
- Sujata Bhatt, Monkey Shadows ( Poetry in English ), received a Poetry Book Society Recommendation; Carcanet Press
- Ranjit Hoskote, Zones of Assault ( Poetry in English ), New Delhi: Rupa & Co., ISBN 81-7167-063-6
- Sudeep Sen:
  - Kali in Ottava Rima, Paramount, London, 1992; Rupa, New Delhi, 1991, ISBN 81-7167-235-3
  - New York Times, New Delhi: Rupa, ISBN 81-7167-235-3 (reprinted in 1993, London: The Many Press, ISBN 0-907326-25-0)
- Dilip Chitre, Travelling in a Cage

=== Ireland ===
- Brian Coffey, Poems and Versions 1929–1990, including "Death of Hektor" and "For What for Whom Unwanted"
- Gerald Dawe, Sunday School, Oldcastle: The Gallery Press, ISBN 978-1-85235-063-5
- Paul Durcan, Crazy About Women, including "The Levite and His Concubine at Gibeah"
- Eamon Grennan, As If It Matters, including "Breaking Points", Oldcastle: The Gallery Press
- John Hewitt, Collected Poems, Belfast: The Blackstaff Press
- Michael Longley:
  - Gorse Fires, including "Between Hovers", "Laertes", "Argos" and "The Butchers"
  - Poems 1963–1983, including "In memoriam", "Caravan", "Wounds", "Ghost Town", "Man Lying on a Wall", "Wreaths", "Mayo Monologues" and "The Linen Industry"
- Thomas McGreevy, Collected Poems, including "Homage to Hieronymous Bosch" and "Recessional"
- Medbh McGuckian, Marconi's Cottage, Oldcastle: The Gallery Press
- Paula Meehan, The Man Who Was Marked by Winter, "The Pattern" and "Child Burial", Oldcastle: The Gallery Press
- Bernard O'Donoghue, The Weakness, including "A Nun Takes the Veil" and "The Weakness", Chatto and Windus
- Peter Sirr, Ways of Falling, including "A Few Helpful Hints", Oldcastle: The Gallery Press

=== New Zealand ===
- Fleur Adcock (New Zealand poet who moved to England in 1963):
  - Time-zones, Oxford and New York: Oxford University Press
  - Selected Poems, Oxford and New York: Oxford University Press
- Jenny Bornholdt, Waiting Shelter, New Zealand
- Alan Brunton, Slow Passes 1978–1988
- Lauris Edmond, New and Selected Poems, Auckland: Oxford University Press
- Michele Leggott, Swimmers, Dancers, Auckland : Auckland University Press
- Bill Manhire, Milky Way Bar, New Zealand
- Bob Orr, Breeze

=== United Kingdom ===
- Dannie Abse, There Was a Young Man From Cardiff, autobiography
- Fleur Adcock (New Zealand poet who moved to England in 1963):
  - Time-zones, Oxford and New York: Oxford University Press
  - Selected Poems, Oxford and New York: Oxford University Press
- W. H. Auden, Collected Poems
- George Mackay Brown, Selected Poems 1954–1983
- Wendy Cope, Serious Concerns
- Paul Durcan, Crazy About Women
- Gavin Ewart, Collected Poems 1980–1991
- John Fuller, The Mechanical Body
- Lavinia Greenlaw, The Cost of Getting Lost in Space
- Philip Gross, The Son of the Duke of Nowhere
- Michael Hamburger, Roots in the Air
- Tony Harrison, A Cold Coming
- Seamus Heaney:
  - Seeing Things, Faber & Faber
  - Squarings, Hieroglyph Editions
- Paul Henry, Time Pieces, Seren
- Linton Kwesi Johnson, Tings an' Times
- P. J. Kavanagh, An Enchantment
- Jackie Kay, The Adoption Papers
- Thomas Kinsella, Madonna, and Other Poems
- Kenneth Koch, Selected Poems, Manchester: Carcanet, American poet's book published in the United Kingdom
- Liz Lochhead, Bagpipe Muzak
- Michael Longley, Gorse Fires
- George MacBeth, Trespassing
- Medbh McGukian, Marconi's Cottage
- Jamie McKendrick, The Sirocco Room
- Derek Mahon, Selected Poems. Viking
- Edwin Morgan, Hold Hands Among the Atoms
- Andrew Motion, Love in a Life
- Sean O'Brien, HMS Glasshouse, Oxford University Press
- Christopher Reid, In the Echoey Tunnel
- C. H. Sisson, Antidotes
- Gerard Woodward, Householder

=== United States ===
- Arnold Adoff – In for Winter, Out for Spring
- John Ashbery, Flow Chart
- Gwendolyn Brooks, Children Coming Home
- Robert Creeley, Selected Poems 1945-90
- Billy Collins, Questions About Angels (ISBN 0-8229-4211-9), the winner of the National Poetry Series competition in 1993
- Paul Hoover, The Novel: A Poem (New Directions)
- Howard Nemerov, Trying Conclusions: New and Selected Poems, 1961-1991 (University of Chicago Press)
- Grace Paley, Long Walks and Intimate Talks (stories and poems)
- Kenneth Rexroth, Flower Wreath Hill: Later Poems
- Eleanor Ross Taylor, Days Going/Days Coming Back

==== Poets represented in The Best American Poetry 1991 anthology ====
These 75 poets were represented in The Best American Poetry 1991 edited by David Lehman, with guest editor Mark Strand:

- Johnathon Aaron
- Ai
- Dick Allen
- Julia Alvarez
- John Ash
- John Ashbery
- George Bradley
- Joseph Brodsky
- Gerald Burns
- Amy Clampitt
- Marc Cohen
- Alfred Corn
- Stephen Dobyns
- Stephen Dunn
- Carolyn Forche
- Alice Fulton
- Louise Glück
- Jorie Graham
- Melissa Green
- Debora Greger
- Linda Gregerson
- Allen Grossman
- Thom Gunn
- Donald Hall
- Brooks Haxton
- Daniel Hoffman
- John Hollander
- Paul Hoover
- Ron Horning
- Richard Howard
- Josephine Jacobsen
- Donald Justice
- Vickie Karp
- Robert Kelly
- Jane Kenyon
- Karl Kirchwey
- Carolyn Kizer
- Kenneth Koch
- John Koethe
- Mark Levine
- Laurence Lieberman
- Elizabeth Macklin
- J. D. McClatchy
- James McManus
- James Merrill
- Susan Mitchell
- Gary Mitchner
- A. F. Moritz
- Thylias Moss
- Joyce Carol Oates
- Bob Perelman
- Robert Polito
- Katha Pollitt
- Susan Prospere
- Jack Roberts
- Sherod Santos
- Lloyd Schwartz
- Robyn Selman
- David Shapiro
- Laurie Sheck
- Charles Simic
- David R. Slavitt
- Charlie Smith
- Elizabeth Spires
- David St. John
- Ruth Stone
- Patricia Storace
- James Tate
- Molly Tenenbaum
- David Trinidad
- Chase Twichell
- Derek Walcott
- Rosanna Warren
- Susan Wheeler
- Charles Wright

==== Criticism, scholarship and biography in the United States ====
- William Meredith, Poems Are Hard to Read, criticism
- Jacqueline Vaught Brogan, Part of the Climate: American Cubist Poetry, University of California Press, scholarship
- M.L. Rosenthal, Our Life in Poetry, collection of literary criticism, including the influential "Poetry as Confession", an article appearing in 1959 in which Rosenthall coined the term "confessional" as used in Confessional poetry

== Works published in other languages ==
=== Denmark ===
- Naja Marie Aidt. Så længe jeg er ung ("As Long as I’m Young"), first volume of a poetic trilogy which includes Et Vanskeligt mode ("A Difficult Encounter") 1992, and Det tredje landskap ("The Third Landscape") 1994
- Inger Christensen, Butterfly Valley: A Requiem (Sommerfugledalen), poems (later translated into English by Susanna Nied)
- Klaus Høeck, Salme, publisher: Brøndum
- Søren Ulrik Thomsen, Hjemfalden

=== France ===
- Yves Bonnefoy:
  - Début et fin de neige
  - Là où retombe la flèche
- Claude Esteban, Soleil dans une pièce vide, Flammarion

=== India ===
Listed in alphabetical order by first name:

- K. Siva Reddy, Sivareddy Kavita, Hyderabad: Jhari Poetry Circle, Telugu-language
- Mallika Sengupta, Haghare O Debdasi, Kolkata: Prativas Publication; Bengali-language
- Nirendranath Chakravarti, Aay Rongo, Kolkata: Ananda Publishers; Bengali-language
- Prathibha Nandakumar, Rasteyanchina gaadi ("Cart at the Edge of the Road"), Bangalore: Kannada Sangha, Christ College; Kannada-language
- Rajendra Kishore Panda, Bahubreehi, Jharsuguda: Soubhagya Manjari, Jharsuguda, Oraya-language

=== Poland ===
- Stanisław Barańczak, Biografioly: poczet 56 jednostek slawnych, slawetnych i oslawionych ("Biographies of 56 Celebrated, Famous or Notorious Individuals"), light verse; Poznan: a5
- Stanisław Barańczak, Zwierzeca zajadlosc: z zapiskow zniecheconego zoologa ("Animal Ferocity: From the Notes of a Discouraged Zoologist"), light verse; Poznan: a5
- Czesław Miłosz, Dalsze okolice ("Farther Surroundings"); Kraków: Znak
- Tadeusz Różewicz, Płaskorzeźba ("Bas-Relief"), Wrocław: Wydawnictwo Dolnośląskie
- Jan Twardowski, Uśmiech Pana Boga. Wiersze dla dzieci ("The Smile of God: Poems for Children"), Warsaw: Nasza Księgarnia

=== Spain ===
- Matilde Camus, Tierra de mi Cantabria ("Cantabria, my land")

=== Other languages ===
- Emperor Akihito and Empress Michiko, Tomoshibi ("Light"), Japan, with English translations
- Mario Benedetti, Las soledades de Babel ("The Loneliness of Babel"), Uruguay
- Odysseus Elytis, The Elegies of Oxopetras (Τα Ελεγεία της Οξώπετρας)
- Ndoc Gjetja, Kthimet ("Returns"); Albania
- Alexander Mezhirov, Избранное ("Favorite"), Russia
- Eugenio Montale, Tutte le poesie, edited by Giorgio Zampa. Jonathan Galassi in 1998 called this book the "most comprehensive edition of Montale's poems"; posthumously published; Italy
- Nizar Qabbani, Syrian, Arabic-language poet:
  - Do You Hear the Cry of My Sadness?
  - Marginal Notes on the Book of Defeat
- Rami Saari, Gvarim Ba-tzomet ("Men at the Crossroad"), Israeli writing in Hebrew

== Awards and honors ==
=== Australia ===
- C. J. Dennis Prize for Poetry: Jennifer Maiden, The Winter Baby
- Kenneth Slessor Prize for Poetry: Jennifer Maiden, The Winter Baby
- Mary Gilmore Prize: Jean Kent - Verandahs

=== Canada ===
- Gerald Lampert Award: Diana Brebner, Radiant Life Forms
- Archibald Lampman Award: George Elliott Clarke, Whylah Falls
- 1991 Governor General's Awards: Don McKay, Night Field (English); Madeleine Gagnon, Chant pour un Québec lointain (French)
- Pat Lowther Award: Karen Connelly, The Small Words in My Body
- Prix Alain-Grandbois: Jacques Brault, Il n'y a plus de chemin
- Dorothy Livesay Poetry Prize: Jeff Derksen, Down Time
- Prix Émile-Nelligan: Rachel Leclerc, Les Vies frontalières

=== India ===
- Sahitya Akademi Award : Girija Kumar Mathur for Main Vakt ke Hoon Samne
- Poetry Society India National Poetry Competition : Rajlukshmee Debee Bhattacharya for Punarnava

=== United Kingdom ===
- Cholmondeley Award: James Berry, Sujata Bhatt, Michael Hulse, Derek Mahon
- Eric Gregory Award: Roddy Lumsden, Glyn Maxwell, Stephen Smith, Wayne Burrows, Jackie Kay
- Queen's Gold Medal for Poetry: Judith Wright
- Whitbread Award for poetry (United Kingdom): Michael Longley, Gorse Fires
- National Poetry Competition : John Levett for A Shrunken Head

=== United States ===
- Agnes Lynch Starrett Poetry Prize: Julia Kasdorf, Sleeping Preacher
- Aiken Taylor Award for Modern American Poetry: John Frederick Nims
- AML Award for poetry Philip White for "Island Spring"
- American Academy of Arts and Letters Gold Medal in Poetry, Richard Wilbur
- Bernard F. Connors Prize for Poetry: Donald Hall, "Museum of Clear Ideas"
- Bollingen Prize: Laura Riding Jackson and Donald Justice
- Frost Medal: Donald Hall
- National Book Award for poetry: Philip Levine, What Work Is
- Poet Laureate Consultant in Poetry to the Library of Congress: Joseph Brodsky
- Pulitzer Prize for Poetry: Mona Van Duyn: Near Changes
- Rhysling Award:
  - David Memmott, The Aging Cryonicist in the Arms of His Mistress Contemplates the Survival of the Species While the Phoenix Is Consumed by Fire (Long Form)
  - Joe Haldeman, Eighteen Years Old, October Eleventh (Short Form}
- Ruth Lilly Poetry Prize: David Wagoner
- Whiting Awards: Thylias Moss, Franz Wright
- Fellowship of the Academy of American Poets: J. D. McClatchy

== Births ==
- January 14 – George the Poet (George Mpanga), English spoken word artist

== Deaths ==
Birth years link to the corresponding "[year] in poetry" article:

- January 5 – Vasko Popa (born 1921), Serbian poet
- January 22 – Robert Choquette (born 1905), Canadian novelist and poet
- January 29 – John Glassco (born 1909), Canadian poet, memoirist and novelist
- February 21 – Dorothy Auchterlonie (born 1915), Australian poet, academic and literary critic
- March 10 – Etheridge Knight (born 1931), American poet
- March 22 – Paul Engle (born 1908), American poet, writer, editor, and novelist
- April 7 – R. F. Brissenden (born 1928), Australian poet, novelist, critic and academic
- April 12 – James Schuyler, 67, American poet and a central figure in the New York School, of a stroke
- June 22 – George Thaniel (born 1938), Canadian poet
- July 5 – Howard Nemerov, 71, former U.S. Poet Laureate, of cancer
- September 2 – Laura Riding Jackson, 90, American poet and writer, of a heart attack
- September 24 – Dr. Seuss, 87, American author of children's verse
- September 27 – Roy Fuller (born 1912), English poet and writer
- October 11 – Steven "Jesse" Bernstein (born 1950), American performance poet, suicide
- October 27 – George Barker (born 1913), English poet
- December 14 – John Arlott (born 1914), English cricket commentator and poet
- Also – Clementina Suárez (born 1902), Honduran poet

== See also ==
- Poetry
- List of years in poetry
- List of poetry awards
