= The Best American Poetry 1991 =

The Best American Poetry 1991 book cover

The Best American Poetry 1991, a volume in The Best American Poetry series, was edited by David Lehman and by guest editor Mark Strand.

== Poets and poems included ==
Poet	Poem	Where poem previously appeared
Johnathon Aaron	"The Voice from Paxos"	The New York Review of Books
Ai	"Evidence: From a Reporter's Notebook"	Pequod
Dick Allen	"Talking with Poets"	The Hudson Review
Julia Alvarez	"Bookmaking"	Green Mountains Review
John Ash	"Cigarettes"	Mudfish
John Ashbery	"Of Dreams and Dreaming"	Grand Street
George Bradley	"Great Stone Face"	Partisan Review
Joseph Brodsky	"In Memory of My Father: Australia"	The New Yorker
Gerald Burns	"Double Sonnet for Mickey"	Temblor
Amy Clampitt	"A Whippoorwill in the Woods"	Boulevard
Marc Cohen	"Blue Lonely Dreams"	The Paris Review
Alfred Corn	"Infernal Regions and the Invisible Girl"	Poetry
Stephen Dobyns	"Desire"	Antaeus
Stephen Dunn	"Bringing It Down"	The Georgia Review
Carolyn Forche	"The Recording Angel"	Antaeus
Alice Fulton	"The Fractal Lanes"	The Yale Review
Louise Glück	"Celestial Music"	New Letters
Jorie Graham	"The Phase After History"	The Paris Review
Melissa Green	"The Consolation of Boethius"	The Paris Review
Debora Greger	"The Afterlife"	The New Yorker
Linda Gregerson	"Safe"	The Atlantic Monthly
Allen Grossman	"The Ether Dome (An Entertainment)"	Western Humanities Review
Thom Gunn	"The Beautician"	Ploughshares
Donald Hall	"Tubes"	Boulevard
Brooks Haxton	"Garden"	The Atlantic Monthly
Daniel Hoffman	"Who We Are"	Grand Street
John Hollander	"The See-Saw"	The New Republic
Paul Hoover	"Desire"	o•blék
Ron Horning	"Second Nature"	The New Yorker
Richard Howard	"What Word Did the Greeks Have for It?"	The Threepenny Review
Josephine Jacobsen	"The Woods"	Ploughshares
Donald Justice	"Body and Soul"	Antaeus
Vickie Karp	"Elegy"	The New Yorker
Robert Kelly	"A Flower for the New Year"	o•blék
Jane Kenyon	"Let Evening Come"	Harvard Magazine
Karl Kirchwey	"The Diva's First Song (White's Hotel, London)"	Partisan Review
Carolyn Kizer	"Marriage Song"	Antaeus
Kenneth Koch	"A Time Zone"	The Paris Review
John Koethe	"Morning in America"	American Poetry Review
Mark Levine	"Work Song"	The New Yorker
Laurence Lieberman	"Dark Songs: Slave House and Synagogue"	Pequod
Elizabeth Macklin	"At the Classics Teacher's"	The New Yorker
J. D. McClatchy	"An Essay on Friendship"	Poetry
James McManus	"Smash and Scatteration"	New American Writing
James Merrill	"The 'Ring' Cycle"	The New Yorker
Susan Mitchell	"Sky of Clouds"	Provincetown Arts
Gary Mitchner	"Benedick's Complaints: Ado About Nothing"	Western Humanities Review
A. F. Moritz	"Protracted Episode"	Southwest Review
Thylias Moss	"Lunchcounter Freedom"	Gargoyle (magazine)
Joyce Carol Oates	"Edward Hopper's Nighthawks, 1942"	The Yale Review
Bob Perelman	"Chronic Meanings"	Temblor
Robert Polito	"Evidence"	Pequod
Katha Pollitt	"Night Subway"	The New Republic
Susan Prospere	"Into the Open"	The New Yorker
Jack Roberts	"The New Reforms"	Sites
Sherod Santos	"Two Poems"	The New Yorker
Lloyd Schwartz	"Leaves"	The New Republic
Robyn Selman	"Past Lives"	Ploughshares
David Shapiro	"The Seasons"	American Poetry Review
Laurie Sheck	"Living Color"	Ploughshares
Charles Simic	"Country Fair"	The New Yorker
David R. Slavitt	"The Wound"	Boulevard
Charlie Smith	"The Woman as Figure"	New American Writing
Elizabeth Spires	"The Haiku Master"	The New Criterion
David St. John	"Merlin"	Antaeus
Ruth Stone	"For Seven Women"	Boulevard
Patricia Storace	"War Movie: Last Leave, 1944"	Ploughshares
James Tate	"I Am a Finn"	The Iowa Review
Molly Tenenbaum	"Reminiscence Forward"	Fine Madness
David Trinidad	"Reruns"	Brooklyn Review
Chase Twichell	"Revenge"	Antaeus
Derek Walcott	"Omeros"	Partisan Review
Rosanna Warren	"Song"	The Atlantic Monthly
Susan Wheeler	"Lasting Influence"	The Paris Review
Charles Wright	"Reading Lao Tzu Again in the New Year"	Poetry

== Most-represented publications in this volume ==
Only one poem per poet is represented in any regular volume in the series, but some publications are represented multiple times among the 75 poems picked by the guest editor (Mark Strand, this year).

In order of frequency, these are the publications most represented this year:

The New Yorker	10
Antaeus	6
Paris Review	5
Ploughshares	5
Boulevard	4
The Atlantic Monthly	3
The New Republic	3
Poetry	3
Pequod	3
American Poetry Review	2
Grand Street	2
New American Writing	2
O.blek	2
Partisan Review	2
The Yale Review	2
Western Humanities Review	2

== See also ==
- 1991 in poetry
