= Scheck =

Scheck is a German surname. Notable people with the surname include:

- Barry Scheck (born 1949), American lawyer
- Denis Scheck (born 1964), German literary critic, journalist, television presenter, and translator
- Frank Scheck, American film critic

== See also ==
- Laurie Sheck (born 1953), American poet, writer and academic
- Schleck
