= Matt Clark (writer) =

American writer

- Writing career
- Genre: Short story

Matt Clark (1967–1998) was a prolific short story writer and the author of the novel Hook Man Speaks. He held an MFA from Louisiana State University, and while a graduate student there, he was a fiction editor of the New Delta Review. He became the director of the graduate writing program at LSU at the age of 29, and he died of liver and colon cancer in 1998 at the age of 31.

His friends and fellow authors, Michael Griffith and Josh Russell, are responsible for continued efforts to bring his work to print. Clark's fiction has appeared in The Alaska Quarterly Review, Cream City Review, Paragraph, Gulf Coast, One Story, and Flyway. Clark's unpublished collection of short fiction is titled South/West.

== Style and themes ==
Fascinated by tall tales and urban legends, Clark was in the process of inventing a new kind of Southwest magical realism, part Mark Twain, part Gabriel Garcia Marquez. His most successful story was "The West Texas Sprouting of Loman Happenstance," which was optioned for film. A script was written by Hollywood actor Brent Spiner.

Clark's writing exemplifies a playful and absurd brand of wit.

His writings include several experiments with perspective. In "What I Know About Ham Ratchetslaw" the narrator and hero is actually a goat. In "Baton Rouge: A Doctor Story" the lens focuses in and out between the lives of several doctors and those of mere garden snails. "The Secret Heart of Christ" is simultaneously a story and not a story.

His use of magical realism is seen most clearly in "The West Texas Sprouting of Loman Happenstance", which features a tribe of chameleons piling on top of one another and changing colors in order to recreate famous works of art. In "What I Know About Ham Ratchetslaw, Trombonist", a small town is besieged and encircled by thousands of hypnotized armadillos.

The geography of Clark's stories is usually limited to the southwest region of the United States. His fiction is set primarily in Texas, although he does stray to Louisiana and New Mexico on occasion.

== Bibliography ==
=== Novels ===
- 2001: Hook Man Speaks

=== Short stories ===
- 2014: "The Taffy of Turvyland" published online by New Orleans Review.
- 2014: "Spider Lilies" published online by New Orleans Review.
- 2014: "The Last Eunuch" published online by New Orleans Review.
- 2008: "Legends, Rumors, Lore, and Revelations (Some Incomplete) Involving Leaton Troutwine, a Local Eccentric/Celebrity/Hero (and Gordon’s Owner)" published in The Folklore Muse: Poetry, Fiction, and Other Reflections by Folklorists, Edited by Frank de Caro
- 2006: "The Secret Heart of Christ" in American Short Fiction, vol. 9, issue 35, fall 2006. (also published in a 2008 collection titled New Stories From the Southwest, edited by D. Seth Horton)
- 2006: "The Crowned Heads of Pecos" in the Southwest Review, vol. 91, no. 3, 2006
- 2006: "Ant Opera" in The Yalobusha Review, vol. XI, 2006.
- 2006: "Baton Rouge: A Doctor Story" in One Story issue number 70.
- 1998: "The West Texas Sprouting of Loman Happenstance" in Texas Bound Book II, page 49.
- 1994: "St. Nicholas Suite" in The Alaska Quarterly Review, Vol. 12, No. 3 & 4, Spring/Summer 1994
- 1994: "What I Know About Ham Ratchetslaw, Trombonist - by Clay Henry, World-Famous Beer Drinking Goat (Buy Me a Cold One Today at Inez's Trading Post, Lajitas, TX)" in Gulf Coast issue 6.1, Winter/Spring 1994 (also published in a 1999 collection titled Starting Rumors: America's Next Generation of Writers)
- 1993: "Some Nights" in Cream City Review issue 17.2, Fall 1993

== Matt Clark Editor's Choice Prize ==
The New Delta Review literary magazine gives a yearly award in Clark's honor. The Matt Clark Prizes are awarded to works of fiction and poetry that compellingly challenge expectations, narratively or otherwise, and are conscious about the way they use form.

- 2016–2017 winners: Joe Rupprecht for "I one day hope to become a large swamp" (Winter 2016); Raven Leilani for "Alabastron" (Spring 2017)
- 2015–2016 winners: Anna Lei for "Thug Mentality" and "I Am Not Famous Anymore" (Spring 2016); Mike Smith for "101 Jokes for Epileptic Children" (Fall 2015)
- 2013–2014 winners: Anders Carlson-Wee for "Riding the Owl's Eye" (Winter 2013); Liam Baranauskas for "The Glow" (Summer 2014)
- 2012 winners: Fiction: Lydia Ship for "Black Dog Nothing"; Poetry: Mg Roberts for "Swollen parts: known as succulence"
- 2011 winners: Fiction: Stephanie Dickinson for "Between the Cold Heart and the Blue Dudes", selected by Susan Straight; Poetry: Kate Rutledge Jaffe for "The Modern Hagfish in Form", selected by Johannes Göransson
- 2010 winners: Fiction: David James Poissant for "The Husband"; Poetry: Sharon Charde for "The Story"
- 2009 winner: Poetry: Mark Wagenaar for "Curio"
- 2008 winner: Poetry: Patrick Carrington
