= Christien Gholson =

American-born writer

Christien Gholson is an American-born writer and author of three books: the novel A Fish Trapped Inside the Wind, a book of interconnected prose poems, On the Side of the Crow, and All the Beautiful Dead (along the side of the road). Gholson grew up in the navy and moved around quite a bit, including Italy, Florida, and Belgium. He attended Naropa University and the University of California, Davis. Gholson's work has appeared in various magazines, including The Alaska Quarterly Review, The Cimarron Review, Hanging Loose, The Sun, Quarterly West, and Lady Churchill's Rosebud Wristlet. His first book of poetry, On the Side of the Crow, was published in 2006 and received critical acclaim. His first novel, A Fish Trapped Inside the Wind was published by Parthian Books in June 2011 and received a Booklist starred review. All the Beautiful Dead (along the side of the road) won the 2015 Bitter Oleander Press Library of Poetry Book Award.
