= Cream City Review =

Literary magazine from Milwaukee, Wisconsin

cream city review
- Cover for the Winter/Spring 2020 issue
- Editor-in-Chief: Sass Denny
- Categories: Literary
- Frequency: Biannual Publication
- Founder: Mary Zane Allen
- Founded: 1975
- Country: United States
- Based in: Milwaukee, Wisconsin
- Language: English
- Website: https://uwm.edu/creamcityreview/ Project MUSE journal 592

cream city review is a volunteer-based, non-profit literary magazine published by graduate students at the University of Wisconsin–Milwaukee. Continually seeking to explore the relationship between form and content, the magazine features fiction, poetry, creative nonfiction, comics, reviews of contemporary literature and criticism, as well as author interviews and artwork.

Published biannually, cream city review attracts readers and submissions from around the globe. Approximately 4,000 submissions are received each year from both unpublished and established writers. The journal reflects this mix as it often publishes poets laureate beside artists who are up and coming.

== History ==
Prior to cream city review, the University of Wisconsin-Milwaukee published Cheshire, a student-run magazine started at a predecessor institution, the Wisconsin State College of Milwaukee, in 1931. The original Cheshire ended in 1968, year before the establishment of a Creative Writing program at UWM.

cream city review was founded in 1975 through the Student Union at UW-Milwaukee by Mary Zane Allen with assistance from Wladyslaw Ciesynski and Mitch Lechter who as an Undergraduate at UW- Madison helped found and publish The Wisconsin Review. After working at The Wisconsin Review, Allen desired a similar literary journal for the creative writing department at the UWM. Allen worked with the student union to establish both the magazine and a reading series. Later, the magazine began operating with the support of UWM's English Department.

Over the years, cream city review has evolved from an 8″ X 11″, 50 page, Xeroxed zine to the 175-225 page perfect-bound book format that it is today. The shift to glossy, multicolored covers began in the fall of 1989 after Laurie Buman became art editor. These covers have become one of the magazine's trademarks.

Along with cream city review’s physical publications, the magazine also has a significant digital presence. Starting in March 2019, cream city review began a blog, which features a variety of content, such as numerous authorial readings, reviews, interviews, and event results. cream city review is also present on social media. Specifically, it is on Instagram and Facebook, where the magazine posts poems, art, information about events and submissions, as well as other interactive content. Current and past issues can be found at Project MUSE journal 592.

cream city review's name pays tribute to the publication's home in Milwaukee. Known as "The Cream City," Milwaukee is the birthplace of the yellow-colored brick, made exclusively from clay native to the area. The first "cream" brick was made in 1835. The bricks proved more durable and aesthetically pleasing than the traditional red bricks produced by East Coast kilns and quickly became Milwaukee's most characteristic building material. Cream City bricks remained popular throughout the 19th century and were used widely for ornamental architecture throughout the United States and Europe.

cream city review's continued success is due, in large part, to grants from the Bradley Foundation, the Wisconsin Arts Board, as well as support from the University of Wisconsin–Milwaukee (specifically, the English Department), and the Letters and Science Constituent Alumni Association.

== Current masthead ==
- Editor-in-chief: Sass Denny
- Managing editor: Carly Davis
- Associate editor: Mari Sweetman
- Fiction editors: Damian Massie and Ali Nowac
- Poetry editor: Alec Dumas
- Translation and consulting editor: Sophie Nunberg
- Creative nonfiction editor: Sophie Wolfe

== Previous Mastheads ==
2023-2024

- Editor-in-chief: Camilla Jiyun Nam Lee
- Managing editors: Kathryne David Gargano, Seth Copeland
- Associate editors: Jehane Sharah, Angela Voras-Hills
- Fiction editor: Sasheene Denny, Jehane Sharah
- Poetry editors: Cassandra Bruner, Seth Copeland, Korey Hurni, Syd Vinyard
- Creative nonfiction editor: Sophie Nunberg, Emma Knickelbine
- Art Editor: Sasheene Denny
- Cheshire Editors: Seth Copeland, Wren Dalton
- Interns: Jacob Collins, Alanda Jackson, Gisella Padilla, Hazel Ramos, Keinana Shah
- Advisory board: Liam Callanan (chair)

2021-2022

- Editor-in-chief: Canese Jarboe
- Managing editor: Camilla Jiyun Nam Lee
- Associate editor: Kathryne David Gargano
- Fiction editor: John Thurgood
- Poetry editors: Sasheene Denny, Kathryne David Gargano
- Creative nonfiction editor: Danielle Harms
- Production manager: Kristopher Purzycki
- Web editors: Jeremy Carnes, Geoff Gimse
- Interns: Sakina Schaub, Grayson Trzcinko
- Development manager: Caitlin Scarrano
- Copy editor: kizzy fay
- Advisory board: Liam Callanan (chair), Kimberly Blaeser, Brenda Cárdenas, Dave Clark, George Makana Clark, Rebecca Dunham, Lane Hall

== Past Contributors ==
- Amiri Baraka
- Aimee Bender
- Kate Braverman
- Charles Bukowski
- Robert Olen Butler
- Maxine Chernoff
- Amy Clampitt
- Billy Collins
- Oliver de la Paz
- Tess Gallagher
- Roxane Gay
- Diane Glancy
- Joy Harjo
- Terrance Hayes
- Bob Hicok
- Allison Joseph
- Caroline Knox
- Ted Kooser
- Phillip Levine
- Audre Lorde
- Adrian C. Louis
- J.D. McClatchy
- William Matthews
- Mary Oliver
- Simon Ortiz
- Linda Pastan
- Ricardo Pau-Llosa
- Adrienne Rich
- Alberto Ríos
- Catie Rosemurgy
- Craig Santos Perez
- Denise Sweet
- James Tate
- Mark Turcotte
- Ocean Vuong
- Gordon Weaver
- Benjamin Percy

== See also ==
List of literary magazines
