= Rebecca Aronson =

American poet

Rebecca Aronson is an American poet. She worked as an assistant professor of English at Northwest Missouri State University (NWMSU) located in Maryville, Missouri, until 2008, when she moved to Albuquerque, New Mexico.

== Author ==
Aronson is the author of Creature, Creature. This was her first book of poetry, and was the winner of the 2007 Main-Traveled Roads Poetry Prize. Her poems have also appeared in journals such as Quarterly West, Tin House, Cimarron Review, The Seattle Review, Puerto del Sol, The Rio Grande Review, and others. Her book was also the winner of the Main-Traveled Roads Press poetry contest. Aronson is a contributing editor to The Laurel Review. She also served as co-editor of the GreenTower Press while located at NWMSU. As of 2013 she lived in Albuquerque, New Mexico.

Her book, Ghost Child of the Atalanta Bloom, won the 2016 Orison Books Poetry Prize, and was a finalist for the 2017 New Mexico/Arizona Book Awards.

In 2023, her book of poems, Anchor, won the Kempner Family Book Prize for Best Poetry.
