= West Branch (journal) =

American literary magazine

- Editor: Joe Scapellato
- Categories: Literature
- Frequency: Triannual
- Publisher: Stadler Center for Poetry, Bucknell University
- First issue: 1977
- Country: United States
- Website: westbranch.blogs.bucknell.edu
- ISSN: 0149-6441
- OCLC: 232113785

West Branch is a thrice-yearly American literary magazine based at Bucknell University in Lewisburg, Pennsylvania, and published by the Stadler Center for Poetry. The magazine, which was founded in 1977, publishes poetry, fiction, creative nonfiction, translation and literary criticism.

Joe Scapellato has served as the magazine's editor-in-chief since 2021. In addition to its print magazine, West Branch also publishes West Branch Wired, an online supplement featuring fiction, poetry, and interviews.

West Branch celebrated the publication of its 100th issue in the fall of 2022.

The magazine's editorial focus has been described as demonstrating strong craft, originality, and emotional depth, with editors seeking work that "embrace[s] vivid language and imagery [and is] not afraid to experiment with form and structure, but always with purpose."

== Notable contributors ==
- Kazim Ali
- Jacob M. Appel
- Dorothy Barresi
- Cornelius Eady
- Terrance Hayes
- Harry Humes
- Colette Inez
- Ted Kooser
- C. M. Mayo
- Dennis Nurkse
- Anne Panning
- Edith Pearlman
- Elaine Terranova
- Chase Twichell
- Robert Clark Young

== Honors and awards ==
Works originally published in West Branch have been subsequently selected for inclusion in The Best American Short Stories, The Best American Poetry, and The Pushcart Prize: The Best of the Small Presses. Randy DeVita's story, "Riding the Doghouse," was reprinted in The Best American Short Stories 2007. Marjorie Hudson's story, "The Clearing" received a Pushcart "special mention" in 2008.

== See also ==
- List of literary magazines
