= The Alaska Quarterly Review =

- Discipline: literary journal
- Language: English
- Edited by: Ronald Spatz

Publication details
- History: 1980–present
- Publisher: [Alaska Quarterly Review] (United States)
- Frequency: Biannual

Standard abbreviations
- ISO 4: Alsk. Q. Rev.

Indexing
- ISSN: 0737-268X

Links
- Journal homepage

The Alaska Quarterly Review is a biannual literary journal founded in 1980 by Ronald Spatz and James Liszka at the University of Alaska Anchorage and continued unaffiliated in 2020. Ronald Spatz serves as editor-in-chief. It was deemed by the Washington Post "Book World" to be "one of the nation's best literary magazines." A number of works originally published in The Alaska Quarterly Review have been subsequently selected for inclusion in The Best American Essays, The Best American Poetry, The Best American Mystery Stories, The Best Creative Nonfiction, The Best American Short Stories, The Best American Nonrequired Reading, Prize Stories: The O. Henry Awards, The Beacon Best, and The Pushcart Prize: The Best of the Small Presses.

Notable writers who have contributed to this journal include Pulitzer Prize winner Jane Smiley, Pushcart Prize winner Ira Sadoff and PEN/Hemingway Award recipient Jennifer Haigh. More recent contributors of note include Peter Selgin, Darrin Doyle, Karen Brown, Aryn Kyle, Bonnie Jo Campbell, Matt Clark, Alicia Gifford, Ann Harleman, Christien Gholson, Alison Baker, Jacob M. Appel, John Gamel, Mary Stewart Atwell, Kirstin Allio, Henri Cole, United States Poet Laureate W.S. Merwin, Lorraine M. Lopez, and Sarah Shun-lien Bynum. Contributing editors include former United States Poet Laureate Billy Collins, Olena Kalytiak Davis, Stuart Dischell, Stuart Dybek, Nancy Eimers, Patricia Hampl, Amy Hempel, Jane Hirshfield, Dorianne Laux, Pattiann Rogers, Michael Ryan, Peggy Shumaker, Benjamin J. Spatz, and Elizabeth Bradfield. The late Grace Paley and Maxine Kumin were also long-term contributing editors.

== See also ==
- List of literary magazines
