= The Cimarron Review =

- Discipline: Literary journal
- Language: English
- Edited by: Lisa Lewis

Publication details
- History: 1967–present
- Publisher: Oklahoma State University–Stillwater (United States)
- Frequency: Quarterly

Standard abbreviations
- ISO 4: Cimarron Rev.

Indexing
- ISSN: 0009-6849

Links
- Journal homepage

The Cimarron Review is a major American literary journal published quarterly by the Oklahoma State University. It was founded in 1967, and its current editor is Lisa Lewis. The magazine has its headquarters in Stillwater, Oklahoma.

== Contributors ==
One of the oldest quarterlies in the nation, Cimarron Review publishes work by writers at all stages of their careers, including Pulitzer prize winners, writers appearing in the Best American Series and the Pushcart anthologies, and winners of national book contests. Since 1967, Cimarron has showcased poetry, fiction, and nonfiction with a wide-ranging aesthetic. Cimarron Review has published authors such as Nobel Prize winner José Saramago, John Ashbery, Robert Olen Butler, Mark Doty, Diane Wakoski, Tess Gallagher, Richard Shelton, Richard Lyons, Rick Bass, Pam Houston, William Stafford, Paul Muldoon, Grace Schulman, and many others. Recent contributors of note include short story writers Jacob M. Appel, Gary Fincke, Rebecca Aronson and poet Christien Gholson.
