= Blues Legacies and Black Feminism =

1998 book by Angela Davis

Blues Legacies and Black Feminism: Gertrude "Ma" Rainey, Bessie Smith, and Billie Holiday
- Author: Angela Davis
- Subject: Music history and analysis
- Publisher: Pantheon Books
- Publication date: 1998
- Pages: 427
- ISBN: 9780679771265

Blues Legacies and Black Feminism: Gertrude "Ma" Rainey, Bessie Smith, and Billie Holiday is a 1998 book by American academic, Angela Davis. Davis examines the music of blues singers Bessie Smith, Billie Holiday, and Ma Rainey from a feminist perspective. Davis proposes that the singers gave a voice to the experiences of America's Black working class and Black women through the 1920–1930s leading into the 1940s, that challenged their depictions in wider American culture.

Davis highlights the importance these women had on the early feminist movement. By using their voices and platform to speak out against topics women oftentimes would be forced to avoid. The term "speaking bitterness" was used to describe the strategy these women employed, singing about harsh topics in order to raise awareness. Some of these topics include: sexual freedom, marriage dynamics and domestic violence, economic independence, and cultural identity.

== Commentary and reviews ==
- Brooks, Daphne (10 August 2020). "100 Years Ago, 'Crazy Blues' Sparked a Revolution for Black Women Fans". The New York Times.
- Colby, Michael (February 15, 1998). "Review of Blues Legacies and Black Feminism: Gertrude "Ma" Rainey, Bessie Smith, and Billie Holiday". Library Journal. 123 (3): 144.
- Davis, Francis (March 8, 1998). "Ladies Sing the Blues". The New York Times.
- Graybosch, Anthony (1998). "Blues Legacies and Black Feminism". Newsletter of the Society for the Advancement of American Philosophy. 26 (81): 12–14. doi:10.5840/saap1998268124.
- Hay, Fred J. (1998). "Review of Blues Legacies and Black Feminism: Gertrude "Ma" Rainey, Bessie Smith, and Billie Holiday". Appalachian Journal. 25 (4): 442–445. ISSN 0090-3779. JSTOR 40933926.
- "Review of Blues Legacies and Black Feminism". Kirkus Reviews. December 1, 1997.
- Nicholson, David (12 February 1998). "Feminism and the Blues". The Washington Post.
- Nurse, Donna (February 21, 1998). "Those old black feminist blues". The Globe and Mail.
- Perlah, Jeffery (March 14, 1998). "Blues Legacies And Black Feminism Review". Billboard. Vol. 110, no. 11. p. 24.
- Purnell, Kim L. (October 2001). "Blues Legacies and Black Feminism, by Angela Y. Davis". Women's Studies in Communication. 24 (2): 262–265. doi:10.1080/07491409.2001.10162437.
- Rose, Tricia (February 24, 1998). "Blues Sisters". The Village Voice. p. 139.
- Stewart, Lindsey (December 2021). ""That's Why I Do What I Do": Southern Black feminism in philosophy". Philosophy Compass. 16 (12) e12789. doi:10.1111/phc3.12789.
- Stewart, Lindsey (2017). "Work the Root: Black Feminism, Hoodoo Love Rituals, and Practices of Freedom". Hypatia. 32 (1): 103–118. doi:10.1111/hypa.12309. ISSN 0887-5367. JSTOR 45153602.
- Woldu, Gail Hilson (1999). "Review of Blues Legacies and Black Feminism". Women & Music. 3: 90. ProQuest 223657094.
