= Schleck =

Schleck is a surname, and may refer to a family of Luxembourgish professional road bicycle racers :

- Johny Schleck (born 1942)

and his two sons :

- Andy Schleck (born 1985)
- Fränk Schleck (born 1980)

Other

- Charles Asa Schleck, American catholic prelate
- Schleck is the German for licking
