= William Dickey (poet) =

American poet

William Hobart Dickey (December 15, 1928 – May 3, 1994) was an American poet and professor of English and creative writing at San Francisco State University. He wrote 15 books of poetry over a career that lasted over 30 years.

== Early life and education ==
Dickey was born in 1928 in Bellingham, Washington and was raised in Washington and Oregon. He attended Reed College, graduating in 1951. At Reed, he wrote a novel for his bachelor's thesis and was elected to Phi Beta Kappa Society.

He was awarded a Woodrow Wilson Fellowship and studied at Harvard University (Master of Arts, 1955) and the University of Iowa (Master of Fine Arts, 1956). As a Fulbright scholar, he studied at Jesus College at the University of Oxford from 1959 to 1960.

Dickey was a student of John Berryman at the Iowa Writers' Workshop. He later recalled:

First to have been at Reed College as an undergraduate with Gary Snyder, Philip Whalen and Lew Welch, second to have been in John Berryman's extraordinary and intense poetry workshop with W.D. Snodgrass, Donald Justice, Philip Levine, Paul Petrie, Robert Dana, Constance Urdang, Jane Cooper, Donald Finkel, Henri Coulette—the list continues beyond the capacity of my memory, but it was a course I approached with rapture and fear, owing in part to Berryman's sometimes jagged abruptness, as when, having warned me beforehand that he was going to exhibit the profound mortality of one of my works, he held it out at arm's length in the class, looked at it with loathing, and said "Now, what are we to say about this ridiculous poem?"

== Literary and academic career ==
Dickey's first collection of poetry, Of the Festivity, was selected by W.H. Auden as the winner of the Yale Series of Younger Poets Competition in 1959. In the foreword to the book, Auden wrote:

It is possible to show evidence of great intelligence and sensibility but to be lacking in the first power essential to poetry, the power to speak, Mr. Dickey's lines have both.

Among Dickey's collections of poetry, More Under Saturn won a silver medal from the Commonwealth Club of California in 1972, and The Rainbow Grocery received the Juniper Prize from the University of Massachusetts Press in 1978.

Dickey was an instructor in English at Cornell University from 1956 to 1959 and an assistant professor of English at Denison University from 1960 to 1962. In 1962, he joined the faculty of San Francisco State University and taught as a professor of English and creative writing until his retirement in 1991.

== Personal life ==
Dickey lived in San Francisco with his companion Leonard Sanazaro, a poet who taught English and creative writing at the City College of San Francisco.

Dickey died in 1994 at Kaiser Hospital in San Francisco. The cause was complications from HIV-related surgeries. Shortly before his death, Dickey finished the poem "The Death of John Berryman," about the suicide of his former teacher. It was published posthumously in Poetry (January 1996) and The Best American Poetry 1997.

In 1996, a collection of Dickey's poems and books was deposited at the Gay and Lesbian Center at the San Francisco Public Library.

== Published work ==
Dickey's published works of poetry include:

- Of the Festivity (Yale University Press, 1959)
- Interpreter's House (Ohio State University Press, 1963)
- Rivers of the Pacific Northwest (Twowindows Press, 1969)
- More Under Saturn (Wesleyan University Press, 1971)
- Sheena (Funge Art Centre, Gorey, Ireland, 1975)
- The Rainbow Grocery (University of Massachusetts Press, 1978)
- The Sacrifice Consenting (Pterodactyl Press, 1981)
- Six Philosophical Songs (Pterodactyl Press, 1983)
- Joy (Pterodactyl Press, 1983)
- Brief Lives (Heyeck Press, 1985)
- The King of the Golden River (Pterodactyl Press, 1985)
- In the Dreaming (University of Arkansas Press, 1994)
- The Education of Desire (University Press of New England, 1996)

His poems have also appeared in many anthologies, including:

- The Best American Poetry 1996 ("The Arrival of the Titanic")
- The Best American Poetry 1997 ("The Death of John Berryman")

Dickey also experimented with Hypercard poetry, which is available at the Maryland Institute of Technology in the Humanities (Mechanisms: new media and the forensic imagination By Matthew G. Kirschenbaum)
