= New Delta Review =

American literary magazine

- Discipline: literary journal
- Language: English

Publication details
- History: 1984-present
- Publisher: Creative Writing Program; English Department; Louisiana State University (United States)
- Frequency: Biannually

Standard abbreviations
- ISO 4: New Delta Rev.

Indexing
- ISSN: 1050-415X

Links
- Journal homepage

The New Delta Review is a literary magazine in the United States in print since 1984 and online since 2012. The journal is published biannually with the support of Louisiana State University.

== See also ==
- List of literary magazines
