= Sarah Lindsay =

American poet

Sarah Lindsay (born 1958) is an American poet from Cedar Rapids, Iowa. In addition to writing the two chapbooks Bodies of Water and Insomniac's Lullabye, Lindsay has authored two books in the Grove Press Poetry Series: Primate Behavior (a National Book Award finalist) and Mount Clutter. Her work has been featured in magazines such as The Atlantic, The Georgia Review, The Kenyon Review, The Paris Review, Parnassus, and Yale Review. Lindsay has been awarded with the J. Howard and Barbara M.J. Wood Prize. Her third book of poetry, Twigs and Knucklebones (Copper Canyon Press, 2008), was selected as a "Favorite Book of 2008" by Christian Wiman, editor of Poetry magazine. Her most recent book of poems is Debt to the Bone-Eating Snotflower (Copper Canyon Press, 2013), which was a 2013 Lannan Literary Selection.

Lindsay graduated from St. Olaf College with a B.A. in English and creative writing, and holds an M.F.A. in creative writing from the University of North Carolina at Greensboro. She currently lives in Greensboro, North Carolina, and works as a copy editor at Pace Communications.

== Works ==
- Debt to the Bone-Eating Snotflower (Copper Canyon Press, 2013)
- Twigs and Knucklebones (Copper Canyon Press, 2008)
- Mount Clutter (Grove Press, 2002)
- Primate Behavior (Grove Press, 1997)
- Insomniac's Lullabye
- Bodies of Water
