= Phillip Levine =

American economist

- Born: 1963 (age 62–63)

Academic background
- Education: Cornell University; Princeton University

Academic work
- Discipline: Economics
- Institutions: Wellesley College
- Website: Information at IDEAS / RePEc

Phillip B. Levine (born 1963) is the Katharine Coman and A. Barton Hepburn Professor of Economics at Wellesley College. He is known for his research on the effect of interventions intended to benefit disadvantaged youth, as well as factors that affect the rate of teenage childbearing in the United States. His research has included a study reporting a beneficial effect of Sesame Street on academic achievement in elementary school children. He is also the founder of MyinTuition, a tool that aims to calculate the actual amount a prospective college student will have to pay in tuition, based on students' income, investments, and homeownership. He was inspired to create the tool when he had difficulty determining whether his sons would qualify for financial aid in college. It was originally launched at Wellesley in 2013, and was being used by 31 colleges across the United States as of January 2018.
