= Lloyd Schwartz =

American poet and professor (born 1941)

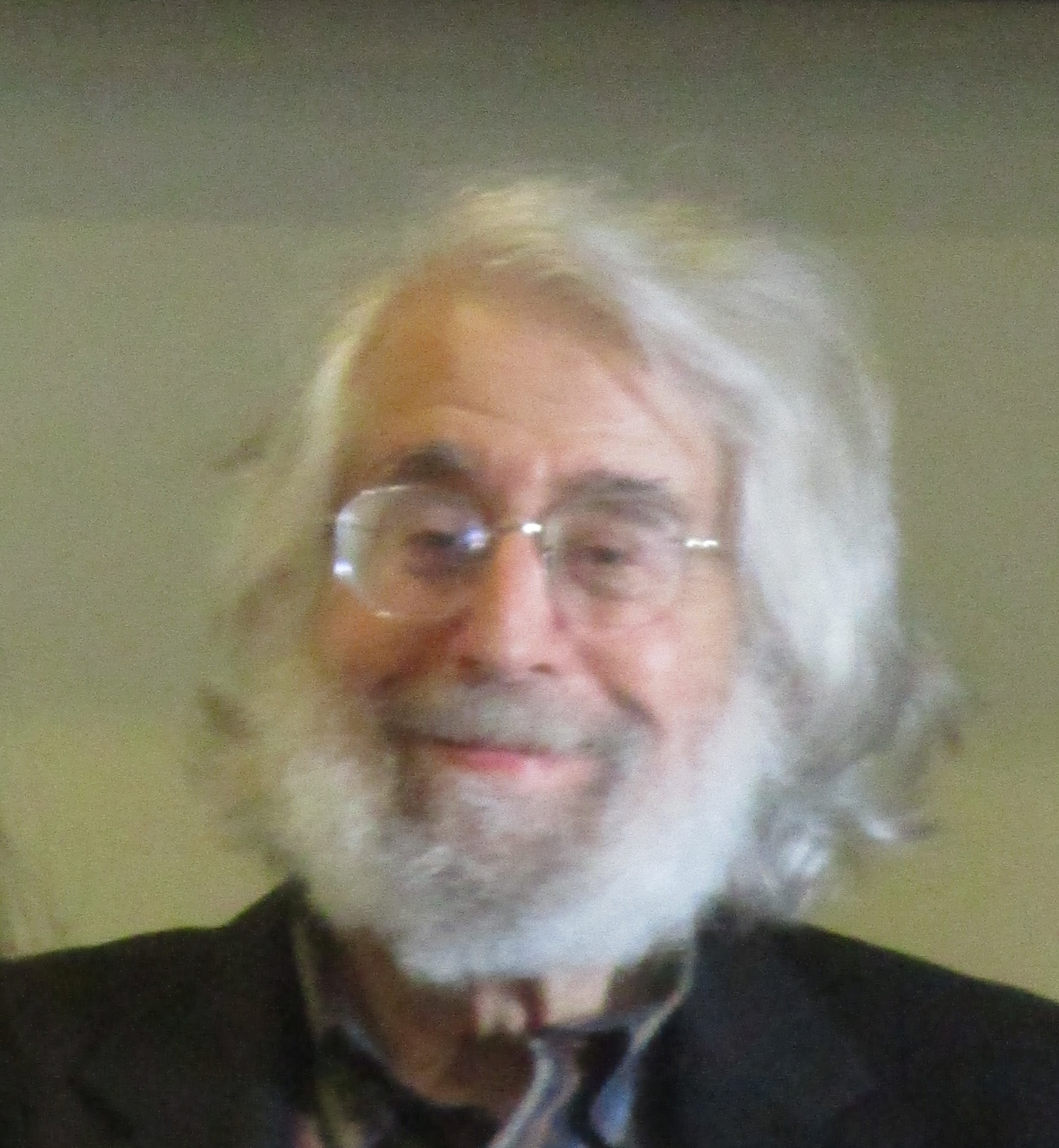
- Portrait of Lloyd Schwartz
- Born: November 29, 1941 (age 84); Brooklyn
- Education: Queens College (BA); Harvard University (MA, PhD)
- Occupation: University of Massachusetts Boston
- Writing career
- Genres: Poetry, Music criticism

Lloyd Schwartz (born November 29, 1941) is an American poet, and the Frederick S. Troy Professor of English Emeritus at the University of Massachusetts Boston. He was the classical music editor of The Boston Phoenix, a publication that is now defunct. He is Poet Laureate of Somerville, Massachusetts (2019–present), was Senior Music Editor at New York Arts and the Berkshire Review for the Arts, and since 1987 has been a regular commentator on classical music and the arts for NPR's Fresh Air. He has been contributing arts reporter for the WBUR website in Boston since 2019.

== Biography ==
Lloyd Schwartz was born in Brooklyn, New York, graduated from Queens College in 1962 and earned his Ph.D. from Harvard in 1976.

Schwartz's books of poetry include Artur Schnabel and Joseph Szigeti Play Mozaart at the Frick Collection (April 4, 1948) and other poems (Arrowsmith Press, 2026), Who's on First? New and Selected Poems (University of Chicago Press, 2021), Little Kisses (University of Chicago Press, 2017, Cairo Traffic (University of Chicago Press, 2000) and the chapbooks He Tells His Mother What He's Working On (Grolier Poetry Press, 2026) and Greatest Hits 1973-2000 (Pudding House Press, 2003), which were preceded by Goodnight, Gracie (University of Chicago Press, 1992) and These People (Wesleyan University Press, 1981). In 1990, he adapted These People for the Poets' Theatre in a production called These People: Voices for the Stage, which he also directed.

Schwartz was awarded the Pulitzer Prize for Criticism in 1994 for his work with The Boston Phoenix. and the Guggenheim Foundation Fellowship in Poetry in 2019. In 2021 he received an Academy of American Poets Poet Laureate Award, and in 2025 he became the fifth recipient of The David Ferry-Ellen LaForge Annual Poetry Award bestowed by Suffolk University and the New England Poetry Club awarded him the Sam Cornish Award, which "honors long-standing poets in New England for their artistic contributions, literary advocacy, and mentorship, recognizing their significant impact on the literary community." He has also received the 2026 Sam Cornish Award from the New England Poetry Club for his poetry and service to the poetry community.

A noted scholar of the poet Elizabeth Bishop, Schwartz served as co-editor of the collection Elizabeth Bishop and Her Art (University of Michigan Press, 1983), of an edition of the collected works of Elizabeth Bishop for the Library of America, entitled Elizabeth Bishop: Poems, Prose, and Letters (2008), and edited the centennial edition of Elizabeth Bishop's Prose for Farrar, Straus and Giroux (2011). He received two consecutive awards from the United States Information Agency to lecture on Elizabeth Bishop and to teach American poetry in Brazil, 1990–1991.

His poems, articles, and reviews have appeared in The New Yorker, The Atlantic, The Wall Street Journal, Vanity Fair, The New Republic, The Paris Review, Ploughshares, Salmagundi, The Harvard Review, The Yale Review, Agni, The Pushcart Prize, The Best American Poetry, and The Best of the Best American Poetry. Between 1968 and 1982 he worked as an actor in the Harvard Dramatic Club, HARPO, The Pooh Players, Poly-Arts, and the NPR series The Spider's Web, playing such roles as Scrooge (A Christmas Carol), the Mock Turtle (Alice in Wonderland), Froth (Measure for Measure), Trofimov (The Cherry Orchard), Zeal-of-the-Land Busy (Bartholomew Fair), The Worm (In the Jungle of Cities), Krapp (Krapp's Last Tape), the Disciple John (Jesus: A Passion Play for Cambridge), and played a leading role in Russell Merritt's short satirical film The Drones Must Die. He also directed two operas, Ravel's L'Heure Espagnole (Boston Summer Opera Theatre) and Stravinsky's Mavra (New England Chamber Opera Group), 1972. He has appeared in The Poets' Theatre performances of Dylan Thomas's Under Milk Wood (2014) and The Word Exchange (2015).
