= Elizabeth Macklin =

American poet (born 1952)

- Born: 1952 (age 73–74); Poughkeepsie, New York, U.S.
- Education: State University of New York at Potsdam; Complutense University of Madrid
- Occupation: Poet
- Website: www.elizabethmacklin.net

Elizabeth Macklin (born 1952 in Poughkeepsie, New York) is an American poet.

== Life ==
She read Spanish literature at SUNY Potsdam, and Complutense University of Madrid. From 1974 to 1999, Macklin worked at The New Yorker, living in New York City.

She spent a year in Bilbao, Spain, until February 2000.

She works as a translator with The Basque Literature Series. Her work has appeared in The Nation, New England Review, The New Republic, The New Yorker, The New York Times, Paris Review, The Threepenny Review, and The Yale Review.

== Awards ==
- 1990 Ingram Merrill poetry prize
- 1993 Guggenheim Fellowship in Poetry
- 1999 Amy Lowell Poetry Travelling Scholarship
- 2005 PEN Translation Fund Grant from PEN American Center

== Works ==
- "Wise". The New Yorker. June 4, 2007.
- Kirmen Uribe. "Danger; Notes on a Loose Piece of Paper; Visit". Graywolf Press. Elizabeth Macklin (trans.). Archived from the original on 2008-05-17.

=== Poetry Books ===
- You've Just Been Told. New York: W. W. Norton. 2000. ISBN 978-0-393-32158-6.
- A Woman Kneeling in the Big City. New York: W. W. Norton. 1992. ISBN 978-0-393-31105-1.

=== Anthologies ===
- Melissa Tuckey, ed. (2018). Ghost Fishing: An Eco-Justice Poetry Anthology. University of Georgia Press. ISBN 978-0820353159.
- Elizabeth Schmidt, ed. (2002). Poems of New York. Knopf. ISBN 978-0-375-41504-3.
- The Penguin Book of the Sonnet, ed. Phillis Levin (Penguin Books, 2001)
- The KGB Bar Book of Poems, ed. David Lehman & Star Black (HarperCollins; 2000)
- Bascove, ed. (1998). Stone and Steel. Godine. ISBN 978-1-56792-081-9.
- Prayers at 3 A.M., ed. Phil Cousineau (Harper San Francisco; 1995)
- Best American Poetry 1993, ed. Louise Glück and David Lehman (Scribners).
- Mark Strand, David Lehman, ed. (1991). Best American Poetry 1991. Scribners. ISBN 978-0-684-19311-3.

=== Essays ===
- "Who Put the Code in the Dagoeneko?" Barrow Street, Fall 2001.
- Molly McQuade, ed. (2000). "It's a Woman's Prerogative to Change Her Mind". By Herself: Women Reclaim Poetry. Graywolf Press.
- "What is American About American Poetry?". Poetry Society of America. Archived from the original on May 15, 2008.

=== Criticism ===
- "Review: 'Blind Man' a sight to behold". Salon Magazine. August 3, 2000. Archived from the original on April 23, 2009.
- Macklin, Elizabeth (October 21, 2001). "A Multitude of Sins NIGHT PICNIC Charles Simic". The New York Times.
- Macklin, Elizabeth (February 4, 2001). "The Road Home, Franz Wright". The New York Times.

=== Translations ===
- Kirmen Uribe (2007). Bitartean Heldu Eskutik (Meanwhile Take My Hand). Greywolf Press. ISBN 978-1-55597-458-9.

== Reviews ==
In May 2000, The New York Times' Deborah Weisgall noted:

Around her poetry Elizabeth Macklin uses grammar as a scaffolding of detachment. She builds precarious platforms that enable her to see her past and her family and to sort through the chaotic pain of memory: to examine the deceptive facets of truth. These poems parse life's sentences. Tension arises from how Macklin tests grammar's ability, both as metaphor and as the raw material of language, to enclose her oblique and urgent questions. Sometimes her grammar is playfully inflected -- she watches, in an altered state, a wisp of smoke rise, "high, highest, higher" -- sometimes dead serious.
