= Mark Levine (poet) =

American poet and non-fiction writer (born 1965)

- Born: 1965 (age 60–61); New York, U.S.
- Education: Brown University (BA); University of Iowa (MFA)
- Occupations: Poet, writer
- Writing career
- Genre: Non-fiction
- Notable awards: Whiting Award (1993)

Mark Levine (born 1965, New York) is an American poet and a writer of non-fiction. He grew up in Toronto, attended Brown University, and the Iowa Writers' Workshop.

He taught at the University of Montana, and at the University of Iowa. His books of poetry include Debt, Enola Gay, The Wilds, Travels of Marco, and Sound Fury. His book of non-fiction is titled F5.

"Debt" was a selection in the National Poetry Series, and he has been the recipient of a Whiting Award and a fellowship from the National Endowment for the Arts (NEA). He has written journalism for The New Yorker, The New York Times Magazine, and numerous other publications.

== Works ==
- Counting the Forests, Boston Review
- Willow, Poetry Daily

=== Books ===
- Debt, Quill/W. Morrow (1993), ISBN 978-0-688-12398-7, a selection of the National Poetry Series
- Enola Gay , University of California Press, (April 11, 2000)
- The Wilds, University of California Press, (2006)
- Travels of Marco, Four Way Books (2016)
