= Jennifer L. Knox =

American poet (born 1968)

- Born: Lancaster, California
- Education: University of Iowa, New York University

Jennifer L. Knox (born 1968) is an American poet.

== Life and career ==
Knox was born in Lancaster, California and grew up in the Mojave Desert. Her father was an accountant from Nova Scotia, and her mother was a speech therapist. She is a dual citizen of the U.S. and Canada. She received her B.A. in English from the University of Iowa, and her M.F.A. in poetry writing from New York University. She has taught poetry writing at Hunter College, New York University, and Iowa State University.

Her first book of poems, A Gringo Like Me, was published in 2005 by Soft Skull Press. A second edition was printed in 2007 by Bloof Books. Her subsequent three books were published by Bloof Books. Her fifth book, Crushing It, was published by Copper Canyon Press in 2020.

From 2016 to 2017, Knox was the developer and curator of Iowa Bird of Mouth, a crowd-sourced poem project.

She lives in Central Iowa, where she and her partner operate Saltlickers, a small spice blend company.

== Awards ==
2016 Iowa Arts Council Fellowship

== Selected works ==
=== Books ===
- Crushing It (Copper Canyon Press, 2020)
- Days of Shame and Failure (Bloof Books, 2015)
- The Mystery of the Hidden Driveway (Bloof Books, 2010)
- Wir Fürchten Uns (Lux Books, Germany, 2008)
- Drunk By Noon (Bloof Books, 2007)
- A Gringo Like Me (Softskull Press, 2005)

=== Poetry ===
- "Managing Your Adult ADHD," The American Poetry Review, v 49 no 3
- "Mr. Big," Poetry. May 2020
- "Full House," Granta (UK). May 1, 2019
- "Finding A Drawer Full of Driver's Licenses," The Kenyon Review, Sept/Oct 2019
- "Pimp my Ride". The New Yorker. June 7, 2010.

=== Essays ===
- “Iowa Bird of Mouth: Keep a 12-Month Crowdsourced Poetry Project in the Air," American Poetry Review, July/August 2018
- “Working Feelings into the Poetry Syllabus," The Washington Post, April 9, 2018
- “Culinary Memoirs of a Non-chef,” The Inquisitive Eater: New School Food, November 8, 2017
- Magma (UK), “I Chose the Poodle: Thwarting Expectations and Shooting Yourself in the Foot with Humour," November 2016

=== Anthologies ===
- The Pushcart Prize: Best of the Small Presses, 2022
- The Best American Poetry (2020, 2011, 2006, 2003 and 1997)
- The Best American Erotic Poems: From 1800 to the Present
- Great American Prose Poems: From Poe to Present
- Free Radicals: American Poets before Their First Books
