= Geoffrey Nutter =

American poet

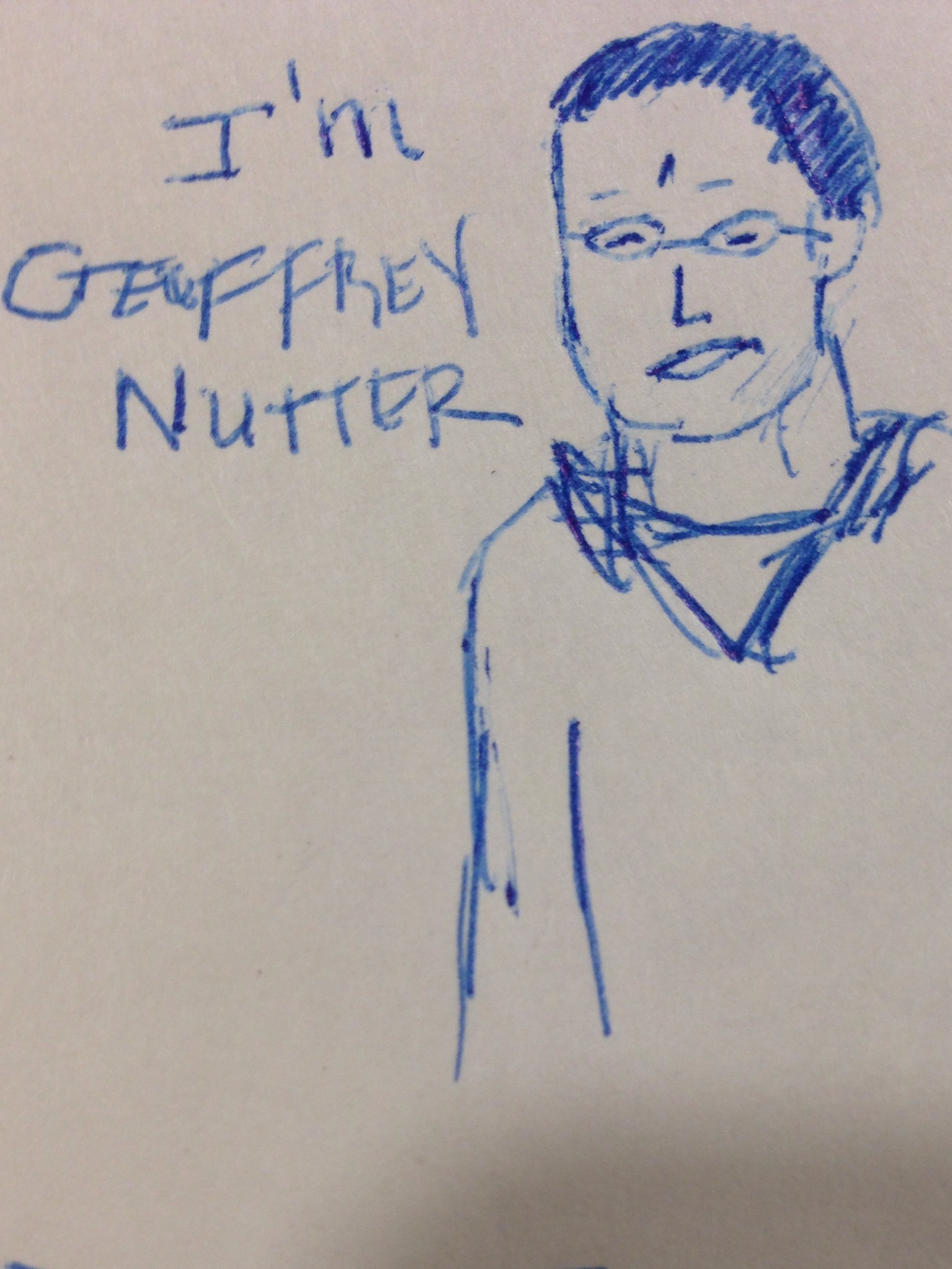
- Pen and ink drawing of Nutter
- Born: USA
- Occupation: Poet

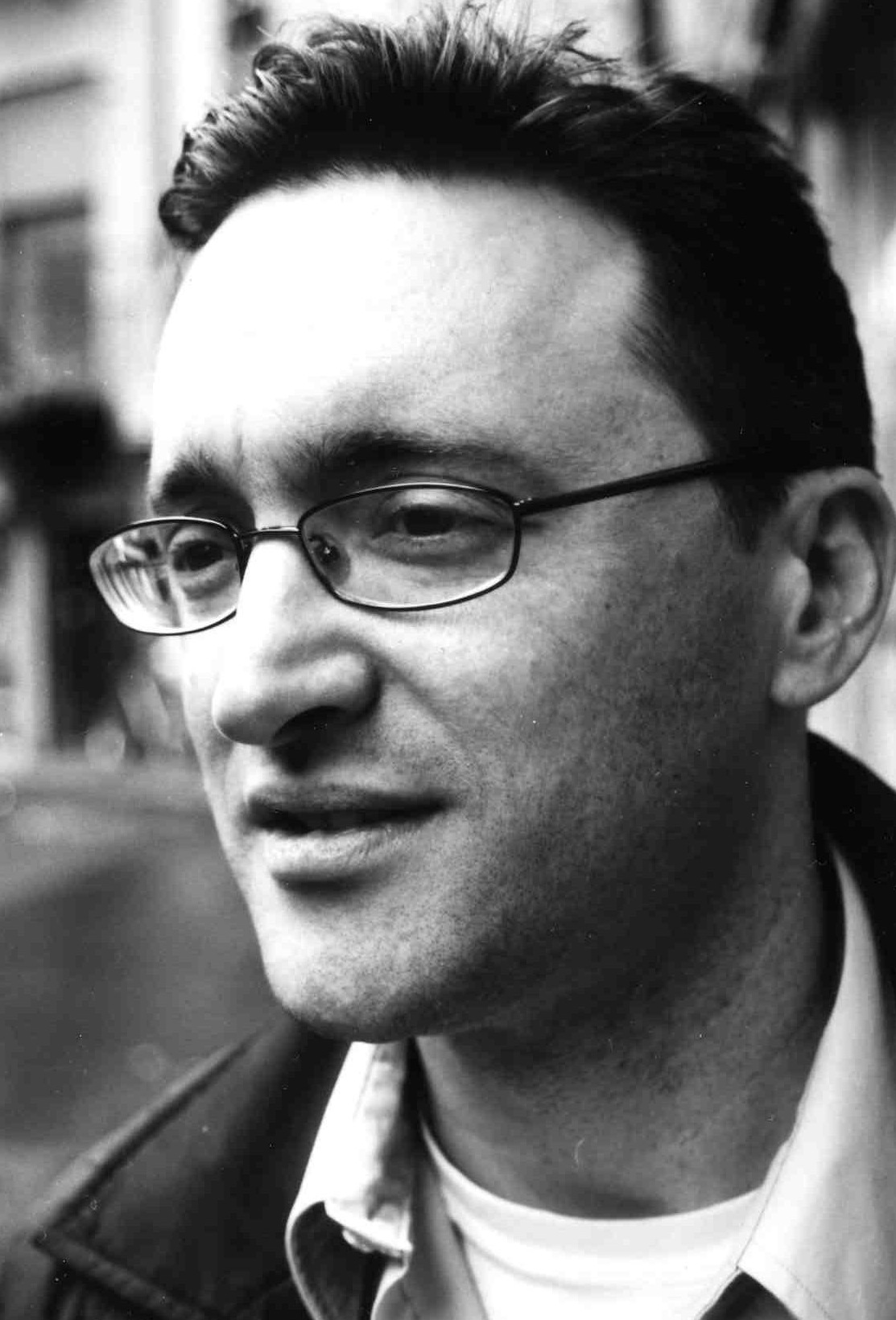
Geoffrey Nutter

Geoffrey Nutter is an American poet, born in Sacramento and based in New York. He is the author of six collections of poetry: A Summer Evening (winner of the 2001 Colorado Prize), Water's Leaves & Other Poems (winner of the 2004 Verse Press Prize), Christopher Sunset (Wave Books, 2010), The Rose of January (Wave Books, 2013), Cities at Dawn (Wave Books, 2016), and Giant Moth Perishes (Wave Books, 2021). He earned degrees from both San Francisco State University and the Iowa Writer's Workshop. His poems have been widely anthologized, including in The Best American Poetry, The Iowa Anthology of New American Poetries and Isn't It Romantic: 100 Poems by Younger American Poets. He is an associate professor of creative writing at New York University and has taught poetry at Princeton University, The New School, The Bronx High School of Science, Columbia University School of the Arts, the 92nd Street Y in NYC, and was a visiting professor at the University of Iowa in 2011. He has also taught poetry-writing to children in Harlem, the Bronx, and Paris. In 2019, he visited China, giving lectures, workshops, and readings as a participant in the Sun Yat-Sen University Writers’ Residency.

== Bibliography ==
- Giant Moth Perishes (Wave Books, 2021)
- Cities at Dawn (Wave Books, 2016)
- The Rose of January (Wave Books, 2013)
- Christopher Sunset (Wave Books, 2010)
- Water's Leaves & Other Poems (Verse Press, 2004)
- A Summer Evening (Center for Literary Publishing, 2001)
