= Josip Novakovich =

Croatian Canadian writer

Josip Novakovich (Croatian: Novaković) is a Croatian Canadian writer.

== Early life and education ==
Josip Novakovich was born in Yugoslavia (in 1956) and grew up in the central Croatian town of Daruvar. Novakovich studied medicine at the University of Novi Sad in Serbia. He left Yugoslavia to avoid service in the Yugoslav People's Army, and moved to the United States at the age of 20. He continued his education at Vassar College (A.B.), Yale Divinity School (M.Div.), and the University of Texas, Austin (M.A.).

== Career ==
Novakovich has published a novel (April Fool's Day), four short story collections (Yolk, Salvation and Other Disasters, Infidelities: Stories of War and Lust, Tumbleweed), four collections of narrative essays (Apricots from Chernobyl, Plum Brandy: Croatian Journey, Three Deaths, and Shopping for a Better Country), two textbooks (Writing Fiction Step by Step, Fiction Writer's Workshop), and hundreds of short stories and essays.

=== Awards ===
Novakovich is a recipient of the Whiting Award, a Guggenheim fellowship, two fellowships from the National Endowment of the Arts, panelist of National Endowment of the Arts, an award from the Ingram Merrill Foundation, and an American Book Award from the Before Columbus Foundation. Novakovich was a finalist for The Man Booker International Prize in 2013. He was anthologized in Best American Poetry, Pushcart Prize (three times), and O.Henry Prize Stories. Kirkus Reviews called Novakovich "the best American short stories writer of the decade". In 2017, Tumbleweed was longlisted for the Scotiabank Giller Prize.

=== Academia ===
Novakovich has taught at Nebraska Indian Community College, Bard College, Moorhead State University, Antioch University Los Angeles, creative writing at the University of Cincinnati, Pennsylvania State University, and the University of Tampa. In 2009, Novakovich moved to Canada to teach creative writing at Concordia University.

== Works ==
=== Books ===
==== Fiction ====
- Yolk. Graywolf Press. 1995. ISBN 978-1-55597-229-5. "isbn:9781555972295."
- Salvation and Other Disasters. Graywolf Press. 1998. ISBN 978-1-55597-271-4. "isbn:9781555972714."
- April Fool's Day: A Novel. Harper. 2004. ISBN 978-0-06058-397-2.
- Infidelities: Stories of War and Lust. Harper Perennial. 2005. ISBN 978-0-06058-399-6.
- Tumbleweed. Véhicule Press. 2017. ISBN 978-1-55065-457-8.

==== Essay collections ====
- Apricots from Chernobyl. Graywolf Press. 1995. ISBN 978-1-55597-212-7.
- Plum Brandy: Croatian Journeys. White Pine Press. 2003. ISBN 978-1-89399-657-1.
- Three Deaths. Snare. 2010. ISBN 978-0-98657-651-5.
- Shopping for a Better Country. Dzanc Books. 2012. ISBN 978-1-93687-306-7.

==== Writing instruction ====
- Fiction Writer's Workshop. Story Press. 1995. ISBN 978-1-88491-003-6. "isbn:9781582975368."
- Writing Fiction Step by Step. Story Press. 1998. ISBN 978-1-88491-035-7. "isbn:9781884910357."
