= Gillian Conoley =

American poet

Gillian Conoley (born March 29, 1955) is an American poet. Conoley serves as a professor and poet-in-residence at Sonoma State University.

Conoley is author of seven collections of poetry. Her work has been anthologized in Norton’s American Hybrid, Counterpath’s Postmodern Lyricisms, Mondadori’s Nuova Poesia Americana (Italian), and Best American Poetry. Conoley's poetry has appeared in Conjunctions, New American Writing, American Poetry Review, The Canary, A Public Space, Carnet de Rouge, Jacket, Or, Fence, Verse, Ironwood, jubilat, Zyzzyva, Ploughshares, the Denver Quarterly, the Missouri Review and other publications. She is the recipient of the Jerome J. Seshtack Poetry Prize from The American Poetry Review, and several Pushcart Prizes. She is the founder and editor of Volt. She is a former visiting poet at the Iowa Writers’ Workshop at the University of Iowa and at the University of Denver, Vermont College, Texas State University, and Tulane University.

== Career ==
Conoley holds a BA in Journalism from Southern Methodist University and an MFA from the Program for Poets and Writers at the University of Massachusetts Amherst.

Her most recent collection, A Little More Red Sun on the Human, was published in 2020.

Apart from her poetry collections, Conoley has also published her poems in chapbooks, including Woman Speaking Inside Film Noir (1984), Fatherless Afternoon (2005) and An Oh A Sky A Fabric An Undertow (2010).

Three of Conoley's poems were included in the second edition (2013) of Postmodern American Poetry: A Norton Anthology.

In September 2014 Conoley publishedThousand Times Broken: Three Books, her translation of three never-before-translated texts by the French poet Henri Michaux, composed between 1956 and 1959.

== Awards and honors ==
Conoley has four Pushcart Prize publications and has won a Fund for Poetry Award and the Academy of American Poets Award. She is a former fellow at the Washington State Arts Commission and a resident at the MacDowell Colony.

== Publications ==
- Some Gangster Pain (Carnegie Mellon, 1987), winner of the Great Lakes Colleges New Writer Award
- Tall Stranger (Carnegie Mellon, 1991), a finalist for the National Book Critics Circle Award
- Beckon (Carnegie Mellon, 1996)
- Lovers in the Used World (Carnegie Mellon, 2001)
- Profane Halo (Verse Press/Wave Books, 2005)
- The Plot Genie (Omnidawn, 2009)
- Peace (Omnidawn, 2014)
- Thousand Times Broken, Three Books (City Lights, 2014)

== Personal life ==
Conoley lives in Corte Madera, California. She is married to the crime novelist Domenic Stansberry.
