= Laurence Lieberman =

American poet (1935–2024)

- Born: Laurence Lieberman; February 16, 1935; Detroit, Michigan, U.S.
- Died: May 30, 2024 (aged 89); Loveland, Colorado, U.S.
- Education: University of Michigan University of California
- Spouse: Bernice Lieberman (1956–)
- Children: Mira Lieberman; Isaac Lieberman; Deborah Lieberman
- Writing career
- Genre: Poetry

Laurence James Lieberman (February 16, 1935 – May 30, 2024) was an American poet and professor.

Lieberman died on May 30, 2024, at the age of 89.

== Books ==
- Carib's Leap: Selected and New Poems of the Caribbean, poetry (Leeds, England: Peepal Tree Press, 2005).
- Hour of the Mango Black Moon, poetry (Leeds, England: Peepal Tree Press, 2004).
- Flight from the Mother Stone, poetry (Fayetteville: University of Arkansas Press, 2000).
- The Regatta in the Skies: Selected Long Poems, poetry (Athens: University of Georgia Press, 1999).
- Compass of the Dying: Poems, poetry (Fayetteville: University of Arkansas Press, 1998).
- Dark Songs: Slave House and Synagogue: Poems, poetry (Fayetteville: University of Arkansas Press, 1996).
- Beyond the Muse of Memory: Essays on Contemporary American Poets, nonfiction (Columbia: University of Missouri Press, 1995).
- New and Selected Poems, 1962–92, poetry (Urbana and Chicago: University of Illinois Press, 1993).
- The Creole Mephistopheles, poetry (New York: Scribner's, 1989).
- The Mural of Wakeful Sleep, poetry (New York: Macmillan, 1985).
- Eros at the World Kite Pageant: Poems 1979–82, poetry (New York: Macmillan, 1983).
- God's Measurements, poetry (New York: Macmillan, 1980).
- Unassigned Frequencies: American Poetry in Review 1964–77, nonfiction (Urbana and Chicago: University of Illinois Press, 1977).
- The Osprey Suicides, poetry (New York: Macmillan, 1973).
- The Achievement of James Dickey: A Comprehensive Selection of His Poems with a Critical Introduction, (editor), nonfiction (New York: Scott, Foresman, 1969).
- The Unblinding, poetry (New York: Macmillan, 1968).

== Sources ==
1. https://thesouthernreview.org/contributors/detail/laurence-lieberman/1613
2. Contemporary Authors Online. The Gale Group, 2005.
3. https://archon.library.illinois.edu/rbml/?p=collections/findingaid&id=1556&q=&rootcontentid=117872
