= Irving Feldman =

American poet and academic (born 1928)

- Born: September 22, 1928 (age 97); Coney Island, Brooklyn, New York, U.S.
- Occupations: Poet and Professor of English
- Children: Fernando Feldman

Irving Feldman (born September 22, 1928) is an American poet and professor of English.

== Academic career ==
Born and raised in Coney Island, Brooklyn, New York, Feldman worked as a merchant seaman, farm hand, and factory worker through his university education. After an undergraduate education at the City College of New York (B.A., 1950), Feldman completed his Master of Arts degree at Columbia University in 1953. His first academic appointments were at the University of Puerto Rico and the University of Lyon in France. Returning to the continental United States in 1958, he taught at Kenyon College until 1964, when he was appointed professor of English at the University at Buffalo, The State University of New York, where he was eventually appointed Distinguished Professor of English; he retired from teaching in 2004.

== Published works ==
- Works and Days (1961), Little, Brown Book Group.
- The Pripet Marshes (1965), Viking.
- Magic Papers and Other Poems (1970), Harper & Row. ISBN 978-0030914645
- Lost Originals (1972) Holf, Rinehart and Winston. ISBN 978-0030914645
- Leaping Clear and Other Poems (1976), Viking.
- New and Selected Poems (1979), Viking. ISBN 978-0030914638
- Teach Me, Dear Sister (1983), Penguin Books. ISBN 978-0802136572
- All of Us Here and Other Poems (1986), Penguin Books.
- The Life and Letters (1994), University of Chicago Press. ISBN 978-0226240671
- Beautiful False Things: Poems (2000), Grove Press. ISBN 978-0802136572
- Collected Poems, 1954-2004 (2004), Shocken. ISBN 978-0805242294
- Usable Truths: Aphorisms & Observations (2019), Waywiser Press. ISBN 978-1-904130-99-4

== Awards and honors ==
Irving Feldman has received a number of accolades for his poetry which include the Guggenheim Fellowship, the National Institute of Arts & Letters award, the Academy of American Poets Fellowship, Ingram Merrill Foundation Fellowship, and the National Endowment for the Arts grant. In 1992, he was awarded a MacArthur Fellowship.

He received the 1962 National Jewish Book Award in the English Poetry category for Works and Days and Other Poems. In 1994, Harold Bloom included New and Selected Poems in his list of books constituting the Western Canon.
