= Quarterly West =

American literary magazine

- Discipline: Literary journal
- Language: English
- Edited by: Claire Wahmanholm and Sara Eliza Johnson

Publication details
- History: 1976-present
- Publisher: University of Utah (United States)
- Frequency: Quarterly

Standard abbreviations
- ISO 4: Q. West

Indexing
- ISSN: 0194-4231

Links
- Journal homepage

Quarterly West is an American literary magazine managed by graduate students at the University of Utah in Salt Lake City. Stories that have appeared in Quarterly West have been shortlisted for the Pushcart Prize, The Best American Short Stories and the O. Henry Prize. The journal was founded by James Thomas in 1976.

In 2011, Quarterly West became an exclusively online literary journal.

== Notable contributors ==
- Micheal Andreasen
- Rebecca Aronson
- James Carlos Blake
- Jackson Bliss
- Fleda Brown
- Raymond Carver
- Susann Cokal
- Annie Dillard
- Stephen Dunn
- Stuart Dybek
- Carolyn Forché
- Allen Ginsberg
- Albert Goldbarth
- Mark Jarman
- Philip Levine
- Maya Pindyck
- Sherod Santos
- George Saunders
- Sam Shepard
- Eleanor Wilneróand
- Antoine Wilson

== Masthead ==
- Editor-in-Chief: J.P. Grasser
- Managing Editor: Joe Sacksteder
- Assistant Editor: Jacqueline Balderrama
- Fiction Editors: Jason Daniels (Senior), Michelle Donahue
- Poetry Editors: Cori A. Winrock (Senior), Alen Hamza
- Nonfiction Editors: Noam Dorr (Senior), Jace Brittain
- New Media Editor: Joe Sacksteder
- Reviews Editor: Jessica Rae Bergamino

== See also ==
- List of literary magazines
