= Harry Humes =

American poet (1935–2025)

- Born: June 5, 1935; Girardville, Pennsylvania, U.S.
- Died: April 4, 2025 (aged 89)
- Education: Bloomsburg State College; University of North Carolina at Greensboro
- Occupations: Poet; short-story writer; professor; editor

Harry Humes (June 5, 1935 – April 4, 2025) was an American poet, short-story writer, academic and editor.

== Early life and education ==
Humes was born on June 5, 1935, in Girardville, Pennsylvania. He joined the United States Army in 1958. He graduated from Bloomsburg State College in 1964, and the University of North Carolina at Greensboro, with a Master of Fine Arts in 1967.

== Career ==
Humes taught at Kutztown University of Pennsylvania from 1968 to 1999.

His work has appeared in West Branch, Antaeus, Gettysburg Review, Massachusetts Review, Poetry, Poetry Northwest, Prairie Schooner, Tar River Poetry, and The Virginia Quarterly Review. He also was editor of Yarrow and Stone Country Poetry Journal. His first poetry collection, Winter Weeds, was published in his 40s, in 1983.

== Death ==
Humes died on April 4, 2025, at the age of 89.

== Awards ==
- Devins Award, from the University of Missouri Press
- Theodore Roethke Poetry Prize, Poetry Northwest
- 1998 National Poetry Series, for Butterfly Effect
- 1990 National Endowment for the Arts Poetry Fellowship
- Pennsylvania Council on the Arts grants
- 2007 Keystone Chapbook Competition, for “Underground Singing”

== Works ==
- Man with a Yellow Pail , Greensboro Review, Spring 2005]
- Flocking , Beloit Poetry Journal
- Winter Weeds. Columbia: University of Missouri Press. 1983. ISBN 978-0-8262-0387-8.
- Robbing the Pillars. Adastra Press. 1984. ISBN 978-0-938566-20-5.
- Throwing away the compass: poems. Silverfish Review. 1986. ISBN 978-0-9610508-5-6.
- Ridge Music. Fayetteville: University of Arkansas Press. 1987. ISBN 978-0-938626-97-8.
- Way Winter Works. Fayetteville: University of Arkansas Press. 1990. ISBN 978-1-55728-160-9.
- Evening in the small park. Owl Creek Press. 1992. ISBN 978-0-937669-46-4.
- Bottomland. Fayetteville: University of Arkansas Press. 1995. ISBN 978-1-55728-380-1.
- Gorse Cottage Poems. Banshee Press. 1998. ISBN 978-1-928823-00-1.
- Butterfly Effect. Minneapolis: Milkweed Editions. 1999. ISBN 978-1-57131-408-6.
- August Evening with Trumpet. Fayetteville: University of Arkansas Press. 2004. ISBN 978-1-55728-774-8.
- Tent sleep: poems. Two Rivers Review. 2003. ISBN 978-0-9744584-1-0. (chapbook)
- Pennsylvania Coal Town: The Girardville Poems. Kutztown: Moonpenny Press. 2004. ISBN 978-0-9758517-0-8. (chapbook)
- Ron Mohring, ed. (2007). Underground Singing. Seven Kitchens Press. ISBN 978-0-9820372-0-1.

=== Anthologies ===
- Jerome H. Stern, ed. (1996). "The Cough". Micro fiction: an anthology of really short stories. W. W. Norton & Company. p. 26. ISBN 978-0-393-03968-9. "Harry Humes."
- James Tate; David Lehman, eds. (1997). "The Butterfly Effect". The Best American Poetry 1997. Simon and Schuster. ISBN 978-0-684-81452-0.
- Ronald Wallace, ed. (1989). "The Man Who Carves Whales". Vital signs: contemporary American poetry from the university presses. University of Wisconsin Press. p. 116. ISBN 978-0-299-12160-0. "Harry Humes."
