= Gerald Burns =

American writer (1940–1997)

Gerald Burns (1940 in Detroit, Michigan – 1997) was an American poet, and artist.

== Life ==
He was educated at Harvard University, Trinity College, Dublin, and taught at Southern Methodist University and New York University. In 1975 Burns moved to Dallas, Texas. In 1994, he moved to Portland, Oregon. Burns illustrated several of his own books, and designed the covers for Boccherini's Minuet and Prose. In addition to his writing and art, Burns also dabbled in amateur conjuring.

== Awards ==
- 1985 NEA Creative Writing Fellowship for poetry
- 1992 National Poetry Series Competition, for Shorter Poems

== Works ==
- Laughter in the Gallery (1966)
- Sonnets from the Middle English
- Boccherini's Minuet (1972)
- The Myth of Accidence (c. 1973)
- A Book of Spells (1975)
- Letters to Obscure Men (1979)
- Toward a Phenomenology of Written Art (1979)
- Prose (1982)
- A Thing About Language (1989)
- Shorter Poems. Dalkey Archive Press. 1993. ISBN 978-1-56478-026-3.
- Longer poems. Barnburner Press. 1994. ISBN 978-0-942829-07-5.
- Probability, Standing Stone Press
- Fuzzy Dice, Standing Stone Press

=== Essays ===
- Howard Nelson, ed. (1987). "From "Poets and Anthologies"". On the poetry of Galway Kinnell: the wages of dying. University of Michigan Press. ISBN 978-0-472-06376-5.
- Tom Andrews, ed. (1995). "A Book to Build On". On William Stafford: The Worth of Local Things. University of Michigan Press. ISBN 978-0-472-08321-3.
