= Hillel Schwartz (historian) =

American poet and historian

Hillel Schwartz (born 1948) is an American cultural historian, translator and poet.

== Education and teaching ==
Hillel Schwartz was born in Chicago and got his B.A. degree at Brandeis University in 1969. He went on to earn a Ph.D. in European History at Yale University (1974), and the following year he got a master's degree in library science (M.L.S.) at the University of California, Berkeley.

Schwartz considers himself primarily an independent scholar, but he has also taught history, humanities, and religious studies at UC Berkeley (1975), the University of Florida, Gainesville (1975–77), San Diego State University (1979–82, 1996). Most recently, he was an instructor in the History Department at UC San Diego (1992).

Schwartz has been both a fellow at and an adviser to the Millennium Institute, a Washington, D.C., nonprofit organization founded in the 1980s to work on global sustainability issues.

Schwartz lives in Encinitas, California.

== Writing ==
Schwartz, who has been called a "peripatetic cultural historian," has written on the French prophets, millenarianism, and copies, as well as on the history of dieting, fat, and noise. His scholarship is formidable, with one of his recent books, Making Noise, sporting 350 pages of notes. Schwartz's work has been translated into German, Italian, Japanese, and Portuguese.

Making Noise examines the changing understanding of sound in western culture—from music to tinnitis, babies' cries to urban hubbub—demonstrating that the primacy of the visual in human experience has been somewhat oversold.

The Culture of the Copy is a comprehensive 600-page exploration of doubles of all kinds: facsimiles, reproductions, fakes, twins, mannequins, trompe-l'œil painting, camouflage, and so on. Schwartz examines how copies have been framed in western culture over the centuries, with a particular interest in the ethical dimensions of our relationship to replicas. Schwartz takes the position that copies are an important part of our cultural inheritance and should not be immediately dismissed as inauthentic.

In Never Satisfied (1986), Schwartz surveys the history of dieting fads and changing fashions in body types, with attention to major cultural shifts around the turn of the 20th century attendant on the rise of consumer culture.

The French Prophets, Schwartz's 1980 book on French prophets of the 18th century, has been called an excellent historical monograph and the first systematic exploration of these prophets' origins.

In Century's End, Schwartz analyzes the fuss that is persistently made over millennial dates, publishing his "wise and humane" survey in anticipation of the year 2000.

Schwartz is also the co-founder of Sage Case Management, a California company that advocates on behalf of people who are terminally ill or in need of complex medical care. This experience led him to write his most recent book, Long Days Last Days (2013), a guide to the experience of accompanying another person through their last days on earth.

As a poet, Schwartz has been published in Beloit Poetry Journal, The Fiddlehead, Prairie Schooner, Field, and James Tate's survey, The Best American Poetry 1997.

Schwartz was co-translator (with Sunny Jung) of poems by the South Korean poet Ko Un, published by Tupelo Press under the title Abiding Places: Korea North and South (2006).

== Works ==
=== Books ===
- Long Days, Last Days: A Down-to-Earth Guide for Those at the Bedside. CreateSpace Independent Publishing, 2013.
- Making Noise: From Babel to the Big Bang and Beyond. New York: Zone Books, 2011
- The Culture of the Copy: Striking Likenesses, Unreasonable Facsimiles. New York: Zone Books, 1996.
- Century's End: A Cultural History of the Fin de Siècle—From the 990s Through the 1990s. New York: Doubleday, 1990.
- Never Satisfied: A Cultural History of Diets, Fantasies, and Fat. New York: Free Press/Macmillan, 1986.
- The French Prophets: The History of a Millenarian Group in Eighteenth-Century England. Berkeley: University of California, 1980.
- Knaves, Fools, Madmen, and that Subtile Effluvium: A Study of the Opposition to the French Prophets in England, 1706–1710. Gainesville: University Presses of Florida, 1978.

=== Selected Essays ===
- "Economics of the Millennium." Two Thousand: Essays on the End, eds. C. B. Strozier and M. Flynn. New York: NYU Press, 1997.
- "A Hands-On Millennium". Future Moment: The Turn of 1999–2001, ed. J. Gary. Adamantine 21st Century Series, 1997.
- "Global Fin de Siecle". Aspenia 2 (1995) 8-21.
- "Stairways to H". Journal of Unconventional History 7:3 (1996) 84–96.
- "NoBody's Fool". Dimensions (February 1996) 20–21.
- "Fat and Time". Dimensions 11 (June/July 1995) 20–21.
- "Legend of the Vanishing Twin". Parabola 29:2 (Summer 1994) 70–75.
- "Torque: The New Kinaesthetic of the 20th Century". Incorporations (Zone vol. 6), eds. S. Kwinter and J. Crary. Cambridge and New York: Zone/MIT Press, 1992, 70–127.
- "Beyond Tone and Decibel: The History of Noise". Chronicle of Higher Education, 9 January 1998, B8.
- "The End of the Beginning: Millenarian Studies, 1969–1975." Religious Studies Review 2:3 (1976) 1–15.
