= Catie Rosemurgy =

American poet

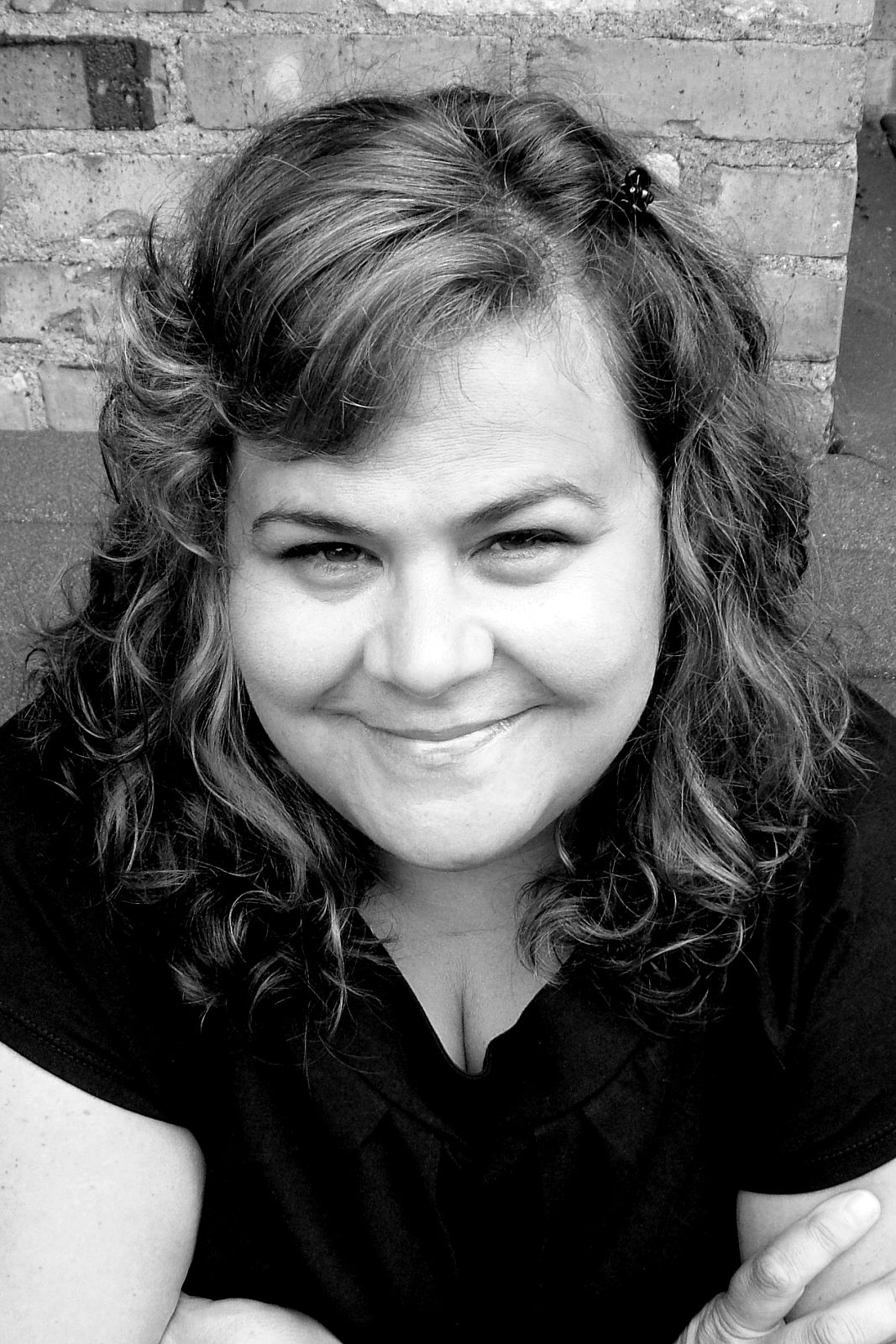
- Catie Rosemurgy
- Education: University of Alabama
- Occupation: Poet
- Awards: Rona Jaffe Foundation Writers' Award; Pew Fellowship in the Arts

Catie Rosemurgy is an American poet who has authored of two collections of poetry, My Favorite Apocalypse and The Stranger Manual. Both collections are published by Graywolf Press. Her work has also appeared in publications such as Boston Review, The American Poetry Review, and The Gettysburg Review. Rosemurgy grew up in the Upper Peninsula of Michigan but now resides in Philadelphia.

== Education & Honors ==
Rosemurgy is the recipient of a Rona Jaffe Foundation Writers' Award, a National Endowment for the Arts Fellowship, and a Pew Fellowship in the Arts. Rosemurgy received her MFA in Poetry from the University of Alabama.

== Teaching ==
Rosemurgy is a professor at The College of New Jersey (TCNJ) where she teaches courses in creative writing, poetry, and contemporary literature. Rosemurgy is also the coordinator of the Creative Writing minor.
