= Bob Hicok =

American writer (born 1960)

- Born: 1960 (age 65–66); Grand Ledge, Michigan, U.S.
- Education: Vermont College of Fine Arts (MFA)
- Occupation: Poet

Bob Hicok (born 1960) is an American poet.

== Life ==
Hicok is a professor of creative writing at Virginia Tech, where he has taught since 2003 with the exception of the 2015–2016 academic year when he taught at Purdue as a full-time associate professor. He subsequently returned to Virginia Tech where he was promoted to full professor. He is from Michigan and before teaching owned and ran a successful automotive die design business. He formerly taught at Western Michigan University.

His first book, The Legend of Light, was published by the University of Wisconsin Press and chosen as an American Library Association Booklist Notable Book of the Year. Plus Shipping followed in 1998. His 2001 Animal Soul was a finalist for the National Book Critics Circle Award. He has since published five more books, Insomnia Diary (2004) This Clumsy Living (2007) Words for Empty and Words for Full (2010) with University of Pittsburgh Press, Elegy Owed (2013) and Sex & Love & (2016) with Copper Canyon Press. His most recent book, Hold, was published in 2018 by Copper Canyon Press. In 2004, after publishing four collections of poetry, Hicok (who previously had no undergraduate or graduate degree) earned an MFA from Vermont College of Fine Arts.

== Awards ==
- 2008 Guggenheim Fellowship
- 2008 Rebekah Johnson Bobbitt National Prize for Poetry from the Library of Congress for "This Clumsy Living".
- 2013 National Book Critics Circle Award (Poetry) shortlist for Elegy Owed

== Bibliography ==
=== Collections ===
- Bearing witness. Detroit: Ridgeway Press. 1991.
- The Legend of Light (University of Wisconsin Press, 1995)
- Plus Shipping (BOA Editions, Ltd., 1998)
- Animal Soul (Invisible Cities Press, 2003)
- Insomnia Diary (University of Pittsburgh Press, 2004)
- This Clumsy Living (University of Pittsburgh Press, 2007)
- Words for Empty and Words for Full (University of Pittsburgh Press, 2010)
- Elegy owed. Port Townsend, Washington: Copper Canyon Press. 2013.
- Sex & Love & (Copper Canyon Press, 2016)
- Hold (Copper Canyon Press, 2018)
- Water Look Away (Copper Canyon Press, 2023)

=== Anthologies ===
- Garrison Keillor, ed. (2006). "Calling him back from layoff". Good Poems for Hard Times. Penguin Group. ISBN 978-0-14-303767-5.
- Charles Wright; David Lehman, eds. (2008). "Oh my pa-pa". The Best American Poetry 2008. Simon & Schuster. ISBN 978-0-7432-9975-6.
- Billy Collins, ed. (2003). "Alzheimer's". Poetry 180: a turning back to poetry. Random House, Inc. ISBN 978-0-8129-6887-3.
- Billy Collins, ed. (2005). "To Roanoke with Johnny Cash". 180 more: extraordinary poems for every day. Random House, Inc. ISBN 978-0-8129-7296-2.
- Bill Henderson, ed. (2000). The Pushcart prize XXX, 2006: best of the small presses. Pushcart Press. ISBN 978-1-888889-21-5.
- Bill Henderson, ed. (2004). The Pushcart Prize XXIX 2005: Best of the Small Presses. W. W. Norton & Company Limited. ISBN 978-1-888889-39-0.
- David Wagoner; David Lehman, eds. (2009). The Best American Poetry 2009. Simon & Schuster. ISBN 978-0-7432-9977-0.
- David Walker, ed. (2006). American Alphabets: 25 Contemporary Poets. Oberlin College Press. ISBN 978-0-932440-28-0.

=== List of poems ===
| Title | Year | First published | Reprinted/collected |
|---|---|---|---|
| Blue prints | 2013 | Hicok, Bob (March–April 2013). "Blue prints". The Believer. 11 (3): 49. | Elegy owed |
| Origin story | 2017 | Hicok, Bob (August 21, 2017). "Origin story". The New Yorker. Vol. 93, no. 24. pp. 46–47. | |
| Man of the house | ? | ? | Walsh, William, ed. (2006). Under the rock umbrella : contemporary American poets, 1951-1977. Macon, Georgia: Mercer University Press. p. 163. |
| The new math | ? | ? | Walsh, William, ed. (2006). Under the rock umbrella : contemporary American poets, 1951-1977. Macon, Georgia: Mercer University Press. pp. 163–164. |
| Peoria | ? | ? | Walsh, William, ed. (2006). Under the rock umbrella : contemporary American poets, 1951-1977. Macon, Georgia: Mercer University Press. pp. 165–165. |
| Remedy | 2021 | Hicok, Bob (September 20, 2021). "Remedy". The New Yorker. Vol. 97, no. 29. p. 38. | |
| ROTC | ? | ? | Walsh, William, ed. (2006). Under the rock umbrella : contemporary American poets, 1951-1977. Macon, Georgia: Mercer University Press. pp. 165–166. |
| Elements | 2023 | Hicok, Bob. (April 24, 2023). "Elements". Granta. Online Edition. | |
| None of the above | 2025 | Hicok, Bob. (June 1, 2025). "None of the above". 149 Review. 1 (17) | |
