= Laurie Sheck =

Author and professor from New York

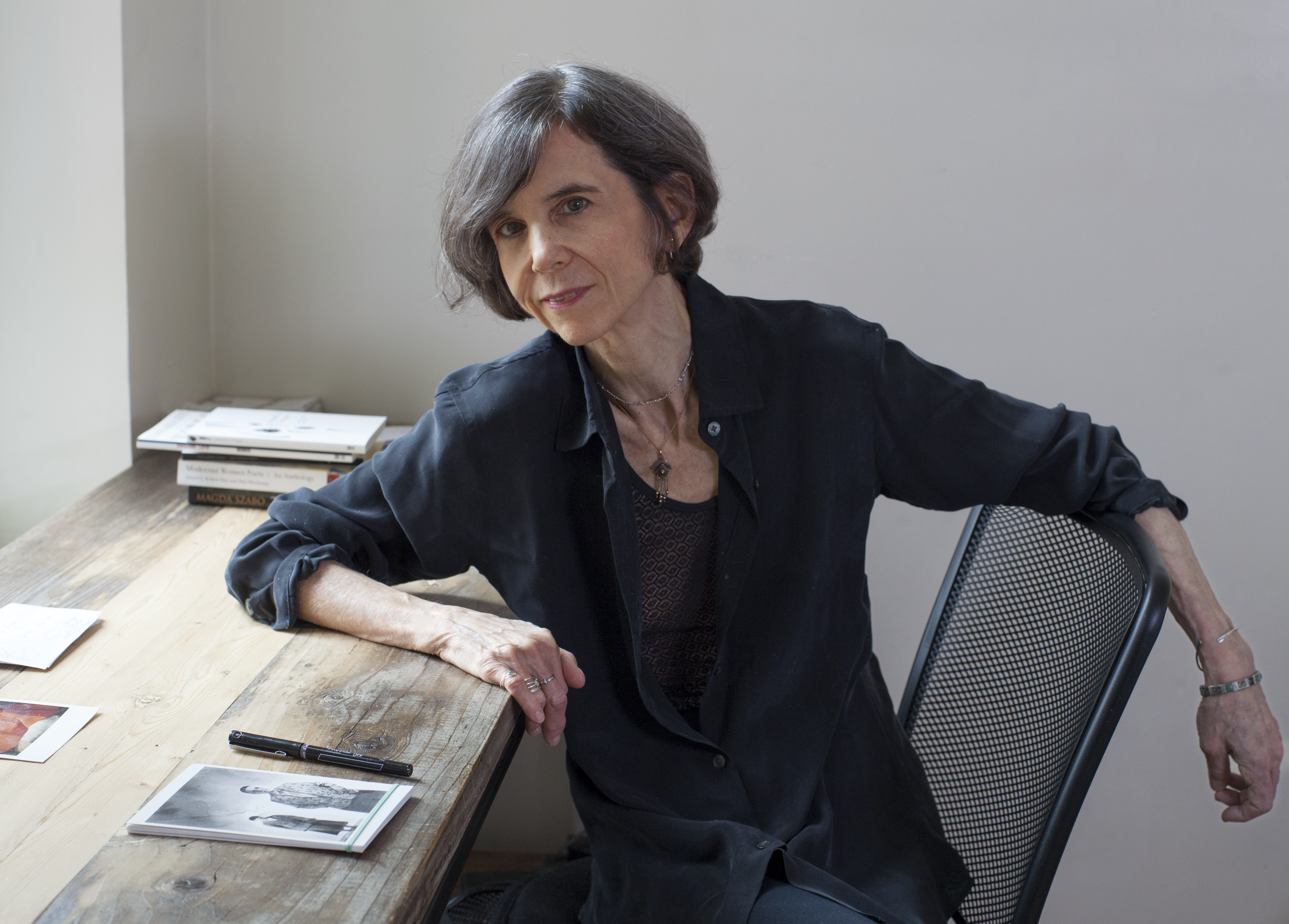
- Born: July 10, 1953; The Bronx, New York, U.S.
- Education: University of Iowa (MFA)
- Occupations: Poet, novelist
- Writing career
- Genres: Poetry, fiction
- Notable work: The Willow Grove

Laurie Sheck is an American author and professor. In 1996, her book of poetry, The Willow Grove, was a finalist for the Pulitzer Prize. Her other collections of poetry include Captivity (2007) and Amaranth (1981).

Sheck is known for her hybrid novels, A Monster's Notes (2009), based on Mary Shelley's Frankenstein, and Island of the Mad: A Novel (2016). Her work has appeared in The New York Times, The New Yorker, and The Paris Review. She is the recipient of fellowships from the Guggenheim Foundation, the National Endowment for the Arts, and the Ingram Merrill Foundation.

She now lives and teaches in the MFA program at The New School in New York City.

== Early life and education ==
Sheck was born in the Bronx. Sheck earned her Master of Fine Arts in poetry at the University of Iowa.

== Career ==
Sheck is the recipient of fellowships from the Guggenheim Foundation, National Endowment for the Arts, and elsewhere she has been a Fellow at the Radcliffe Institute for Advance Study at Harvard University and at the Cullman Center for Scholars and Writers at the New York Public Library, the Ingram Merrill Foundation, and others. In 2023 she was awarded a literature grant from the Creative Capital Foundation.

Sheck's poems have been featured in The Pushcart Prize series three times and two volumes of Best American Poetry.

Her essays have appeared in Granta, The Atlantic, The Paris Review, and elsewhere.

Sheck previously taught at University of Iowa, Rutgers University, Columbia University, New York University, Princeton University, and now teaches at The New School She was also the Sidney Harman Distinguished Visiting Writer at Baruch College, CUNY.

While discussing her works of poetry with Susan Wheeler of BOMB Magazine, Sheck stated, "Intensity is one of the things we respond to in art—and a sense of necessity, just as form in many ways grows out of the necessity of the poem."

Her philosophy of writing is expressed in her classroom and interviews, advising her students about nontraditional forms of writing, "if you create a world on the page in which things that seem not to hold together can interact with each other, they can hold, and part of what's holding, part of what's interesting, is the way that things don't directly hook up."

In December 2025, Sheck was a guest on the Off the Shelf Podcast.

== Controversy ==
In 2019, during a discussion of James Baldwin's essay "The Creative Process," Sheck quoted Baldwin directly and was subsequently accused of using a racial slur.

Her position at The New School was under investigation by the university after two students filed complaints against her. As the investigation period closed, The New School wrote to Sheck stating, "after carefully considering the complaints and reviewing the evidence, we have determined that you did not violate the university's policy on discrimination", and saying that open "and robust discussion of often difficult issues is and has always been central to our mission as a university, as is our commitment to provide a learning environment that is effective in educating our students." Those principles are "foundational to our teaching and learning, as we strive to ensure that all members of our community are able to advance their intellectual, creative and professional pursuits."

In the same year, PEN America released a public statement criticizing any potential threat to Sheck's career as a professor. PEN declared that imposing punishment on Sheck "represents a troubling threat to academic freedom and free speech in the classroom".

Jonathan Friedman, project director for campus free speech at PEN America, said, "...this is a case where intent matters. There is a distinction to be made between a racial slur wielded against someone and a quote used for pedagogical purposes in a class on James Baldwin. The New School cannot and must not discipline a professor for speech that is protected by the principle of academic freedom.”

Sheck went back to teaching in the fall semester of 2019 after the investigation was closed.

== Bibliography ==
Sheck has written the following works:

- Island of the Mad: A Novel (2016)
- A Monster's Notes (2009)
- Captivity (2007)
- Black Series (2001)
- The Willow Grove (1996)
- Io at Night (1989)
- Amaranth (1981)

A Monster's Notes was referred to as "utterly astonishing and not to be missed" by the Kirkus Reviews and as "an intellectually thrilling, stunningly original tale" by BOMB Magazine.
