= Charlie Smith (American poet) =

American poet and novelist

Charlie Smith (born June 27, 1947) is a poet and novelist. He has written seven novels and seven books of poetry. He has won the Aga Khan Prize, the Levinson prize, the J. Howard and Barbara M.J. Wood prize, a Guggenheim Fellowship, and a grant from the National Endowment for the Arts. His writing has appeared in magazines and journals such as The New Yorker, The Paris Review, Harper's, The New Republic, the New York Times, and The Nation. He lives in New York City and Key West.

Books of poetry include:

- Demo
- Jump Soul
- Word Comix
- Women of America
- Heroin and Other Poems
- Before and After
- The Palms
- Indistinguishable from the Darkness
- Red Roads

Novels include:

- Men in Miami Hotels
- Three Delays
- Cheap Ticket to Heaven
- Chimney Rock
- The Lives of the Dead
- Shine Hawk
- Canaan

He has also written a book of three novellas entitled Crystal River.
