= Ai (poet) =

American poet (1947–2010)

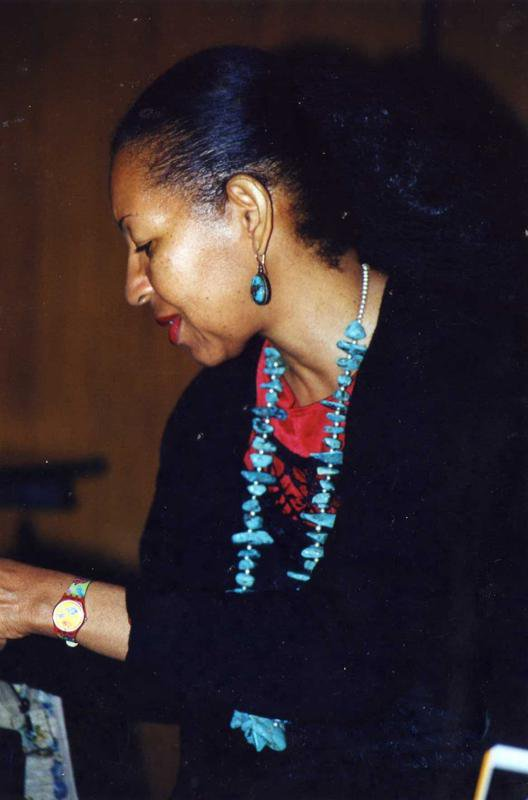
- Born: Florence Anthony; October 21, 1947; Albany, Texas, United States
- Died: March 20, 2010 (aged 62); Stillwater, Oklahoma, United States
- Occupation: Poet
- Writing career
- Genre: Contemporary American Literature
- Notable work: Vice (1999)
- Notable awards: National Book Award; 1999

Florence Ai Ogawa (born Florence Anthony; October 21, 1947 – March 20, 2010) was an American poet and educator who won the 1999 National Book Award for Poetry for Vice: New and Selected Poems. Ai is known for her mastery of the dramatic monologue as a poetic form, as well as for taking on dark, controversial topics in her work. About writing in the dramatic monologue form, she's said: "I want to take the narrative 'persona' poem as far as I can, and I've never been one to do things in halves. All the way or nothing. I won't abandon that desire."

== Early life ==
Ai, who described herself as 1/2 Japanese, 1/8 Choctaw-Chickasaw, 1/4 Black, 1/16 Irish, Southern Cheyenne, and Comanche, was born in Albany, Texas, in 1947, and grew up in Tucson, Arizona. She spent time also in Los Angeles, Las Vegas, and San Francisco, living with her mother and second stepfather, Sutton Haynes. In 1959, a couple of years after her mother's divorce from Hayes, they moved back to Tucson, Arizona, where she completed high school and attended college at the University of Arizona, where she majored in English and Oriental Studies with a concentration in Japanese and a minor in Creative Writing, to which she would fully commit toward the end of her degree.

Before starting college, one night during dinner with her mother and third stepfather, Ai learned her biological father was Japanese. Known as Florence Hayes throughout her childhood and undergrad years, it was not until graduate school, when Ai was going to switch her last name back to Anthony, that her mother finally told her more details about her past, learning that she had an affair with a Japanese man, Michael Ogawa, after meeting him at a streetcar stop. Learning of the affair had led Ai's first stepfather, whose last name was "Anthony", to beat her mother until family intervened and she was taken to Texas, where her stepfather eventually followed after Ai's birth. Because her mother was still legally married to Anthony at the time, his last name was put on Ai's birth certificate. Although she identified as being of Native American descent, she was not enrolled in any Native nation.

The poverty Ai experienced during her childhood affected her and her writing. Ai credits her first writing experience to an assignment in her Catholic school English class to write a letter from the perspective of a martyr. Two years after that experience, she began actively writing at the age of 14. History had been one of her many interests since high school.

== Career ==
From 1969 to 1971, Ai attended the University of California at Irvine's M.F.A program where she worked under the likes of Charles Wright and Donald Justice. She is the author of No Surrender, (2010), which was published after her death, Dread (W. W. Norton & Co., 2003); Vice (1999), which won the National Book Award; Greed (1993); Fate (1991); Sin (1986), which won an American Book Award from the Before Columbus Foundation; Killing Floor (1979), which was the 1978 Lamont Poetry Selection of the Academy of American Poets; and Cruelty (1973).

She also received awards from the Guggenheim Foundation, the National Endowment for the Arts, the Bunting Fellowship Program at Radcliffe College and from various universities. She was a visiting instructor at Binghamton University, State University of New York for the 1973–74 academic year. After winning the National Book Award for Vice she became a tenured professor and the vice president of the Native American Faculty and Staff Association at Oklahoma State University and lived in Stillwater, Oklahoma until her death.

== Literary views/interviews ==
Ai Ogawa considered herself as "simply a writer" rather than a spokesperson for any particular group. About her own poetry in an interview with Lawrence Kearney and Michael Cuddihy in 1978, she emphasized that there are no "confessional" or autobiographical elements in her work. However, in an interview with Okla Elliott in 2003 after the publication of Dread, she stated that some of the poems and characters in that book are "fictionalized versions" of her family history and that her multi-racial background and interest in history has had a strong influence on her work in this particular collection.

In a 1999 interview, Ai was asked about the topics she uses in her writings, such as child abuse, necrophilia, and murder. When asked by interviewer Elizabeth Farnsworth why she chooses to write on these topics, Ai replied that “it’s really the characters, because [she] write[s] monologues” (Farnsworth). She also spoke about her choice of characters that “there’s a lot more to talk about with the scoundrels” (Farnsworth).

In that same interview, Farnsworth commented on the fact that even though Ai's poetry is written in first person, she is “almost always someone else” (Farnsworth). Ai also told Farnsworth that her “first poetry teacher said that when you wrote in the first person, that your work was often stronger” (Farnsworth). Throughout her writing career, Ai eventually realized that her “poems that were written in the first person were the strongest” (Farnsworth). She also told Farnsworth that she considers herself an “actor” and that is how she is able to successfully write as other characters.

Farnsworth asked Ai about her poem about Jimmy Hoffa- “Jimmy Hoffa’s Odyssey.” Ai told Farnsworth that she got the idea from watching a The Tonight Show Starring Johnny Carson. Carson had told a joke that inspired Ai to write the poem. After she decided to write the poem, she found a biography on Hoffa and studied it before writing the piece. Ai said that she often reads biographies before writing a poem on an historical figure.

While her work often contains sex, violence, and other controversial subjects, she told Kearney and Cuddihy during that 1978 interview that she did not view her use of them as gratuitous. Concerning the poems in her first collection, Cruelty, she said: "I wanted people to see how they treated each other and themselves." She noted that the difference between the poems in Cruelty and those in Killing Floor is that they deal with her character's whole life rather than a single episode. She described her purpose for writing as "trying to integrate [her] life emotionally and spiritually."

When Ai was asked why she thought her work was so “edgy and dark”, Ai stated that “violence is an integral part of American culture” (Farnsworth). She tries to deal with that in her writing, which is something she said she has been working on her whole life. She said that “she was not able to deal with violence in [her] work” early in her writing career, and that was something she intentionally set out to do.

About contemporary American poetry and her own risk-taking in her work she said: "Perhaps there's a fear of revealing too much emotion in American poetry, despite the go-ahead of a sort from confessional poetry. At any rate, I think that that is my goal—I mean I never want to say 'I have plenty of heart,' but I want to be able to say whatever I feel without fear or embarrassment."

== Name change ==
In 1973, she legally changed her last name to Ogawa and her middle name to "Ai" (愛), which translates to "love" in Japanese, a pen name she had been using since 1969.

== Death ==
Ai was checked into the hospital on March 17, 2010, for pneumonia. Three days later, Ai died on March 20, 2010, at age 62, in Stillwater, Oklahoma, from complications of stage 4 breast cancer.

== Selected works ==
=== Poetry collections ===
- Cruelty, Perseus Books Group, 1973, ISBN 9780938410386
- Killing Floor, Houghton Mifflin, 1979, ISBN 9780395275900
- Sin, Houghton Mifflin, 1986, ISBN 9780395379073
- Fate, Houghton Mifflin, 1991, ISBN 9780395556375
- Greed. Norton. 1993. ISBN 9780393035612.
- Vice: New and Selected Poems, Norton, 1999, ISBN 9780393047059 – winner of the National Book Award
- Dread: Poems, W.W. Norton, 2003, ISBN 9780393041439
- No Surrender. W. W. Norton & Company. 2010. ISBN 9780393078862.
- The Collected Poems of Ai. W. W. Norton & Company. 2013. p. 448. ISBN 9780393089202.

== See also ==
- List of writers from peoples indigenous to the Americas
