= List of University of North Carolina at Greensboro alumni =

The University of North Carolina at Greensboro is a public institution located in Greensboro, North Carolina. Historically a women's college, it was known as the State Normal and Industrial School from 1891 to 1896, the State Normal and Industrial College from 1896 to 1919, the North Carolina College for Women from 1919 to 1932, and the Woman's College of the University of North Carolina from 1932 to 1963. It became a coeducational university, as one of the three charter institutions of the consolidated University of North Carolina, in 1963. Following are some of its notable alumni.

== Academics ==
- Kari Adamsons (MA 2003, Ph.D. 2006) – associate professor of human development and family studies at University of Connecticut
- Norman B. Anderson – professor studying health disparities and mind/body health at Florida State University
- Mary Michel Boulus (1947) – president of Sacred Heart College
- Kevin Cokley (MA 1993) – associate chair of diversity initiatives and professor of psychology at the University of Michigan Ann Arbor
- Barbara L. Drinkwater (MSc) – president of the American College of Sports Medicine
- Etta C. Gravely (non-degreed) – associate professor of chemistry education at North Carolina A&T State University
- Jonathan D. Green – musicologist, composer, and academic administrator serving as president of Susquehanna University
- Ione Grogan (BA 1913 and 1926) – academic and educator
- Lee Hall (BFA 1955) – painter, writer, educator, and university president
- James D. Herbert (MA and Ph.D.) – psychologist and sixth president of the University of New England
- Matthew Hughey (BA 1999) – professor of sociology at the University of Connecticut
- Elva Jones (MA) – professor and founding chair of the Department of Computer Science at Winston-Salem State University
- Patsy M. Lightbown (BA 1965) – applied linguist and Distinguished Professor Emerita at Concordia University
- Gwendolyn O'Neal (M.Ed. 1953) – interim president of Bennett College
- Len Preslar (MBA) – distinguished professor of practice at Wake Forest University
- Nido Qubein (MS 1973) – president of High Point University
- Katherine A. Rawson (BA 1999) – professor in the Department of Psychological Sciences at Kent State University
- Margaret J. Safrit (1957) – kinesiologist, college professor
- Cleveland Sellers (EdD) – president of Voorhees College and civil rights activist
- Anna Maria Siega-Riz (MS 1983) – dean of the University of Massachusetts Amherst School of Public Health and Health Sciences
- Lelia Judson Tuttle (1900) – chair of the English literature department at McTyeire Institute and dean of women at Soochow University
- Timothy Tyson (non-degreed) – senior research scholar at the Center for Documentary Studies at Duke University and an adjunct professor of American Studies at the University of North Carolina
- Celeste Ulrich (BS 1946) – professor and dean of the College of Human Development and Performance at the University of Oregon

== Art and architecture ==
- James Barnhill (MFA 1982) – artist
- Phyllis Birkby (non-degreed) – architect
- Kendel Boone – documentary photographer
- Clyde Caldwell (MFA) – artist and fantasy illustrator
- MC Coble (BFA 2001) – performance artist
- Karen Favreau (MLIS and MEd) – comic artist
- Carla Gannis (BFA) – transmedia artist
- Jim Gaylord (1997) – artist
- Margaret McConnell Holt (1930) – artist
- Marcia Jones (MFA 2004) – contemporary artist known for multimedia and large-scale installation works
- Alan LeQuire (MFA) – sculptor
- Gwendolyn Ann Magee (BA 1963) – fiber artist
- Ellen Murray (BFA 1969) – watercolorist
- Jane South (MFA 1997) – artist known for large scale installations, mixed media constructions, and fabric wall pieces
- Carol Sutton (MFA 1969) – multidisciplinary artist
- Bayard Wootten (1894) – photographer

== Business ==
- Doris Davis Centini (1953) – food scientist with Stouffer's Food's, helped develop food for Apollo 11
- Janet Danahey (1978) - mass murderer who earned a degree in Business Administration

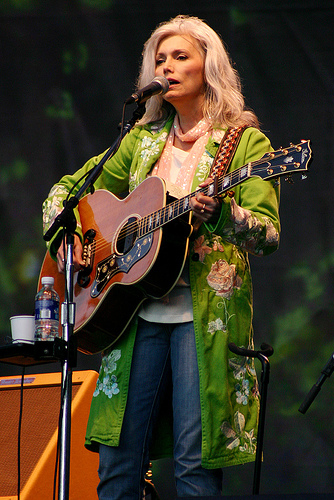
Emmylou Harris

== Entertainment ==
- Patrick Ball (actor) (BFA) - actor
- Tyler Barnhardt (BFA 2015) – actor
- Binki – singer and songwriter
- Chrystelle Trump Bond (BS 1960, MFA 1963) – dancer, choreographer, and dance historian
- Jay Bushman – Emmy Award-winning transmedia writer and book author
- Andy Cabic – singer-songwriter for the band Vetiver
- Chris Chalk – actor in the show Gotham and the movie 12 Years a Slave
- Ashlei Sharpe Chestnut (BFA) – actress and writer
- DaBaby (non-degreed) – rapper
- The Darlinettes – vocal group
- Hermene Warlick Eichhorn (BS 1926) – musician and composer
- Ansel Elkins (MFA) – poet
- David Epley (BFA) – stage actor, and comedian
- Emily V. Gordon (MS and EdS) – writer, producer, and Academy Award-nominated for her autobiographical film The Big Sick
- Melanie Greene (MFA) – dancer and choreographer
- Emmylou Harris (non-degreed) – Grammy Award-winning singer and songwriter
- Indonesia Hayes – rapper and member of CUZZOS
- Lauren Holt (BFA 2013) – actress, comedian, and former cast member of Saturday Night Live
- Brian Huskey – character actor and comedian
- Mark Janicello – singer, actor, writer and producer
- Beth Leavel (1980) – Tony Award-winning actress
- Linda Lister (DMA 1998) – soprano and teacher of singing
- Beth Mitchell – competitive shag dancer
- Nadia Moffett – Miss North Carolina USA 2010
- Anne-Claire Niver (BM 2013) – singer and songwriter
- Howard R. Paul – guitarist; former president and CEO of Benedetto Guitars
- Anne Pitoniak – actress
- Samwell – internet celebrity made famous by his video "What What (In the Butt)"
- Rhea G. Sikes – television producer with PBS
- Tom Smith (MA) – musician, inductee into Jazz Education Hall of Fame
- Emily Spivey – television writer and producer
- Justin Tornow (BA 2001, MFA 2010) – dancer and choreographer
- Jan Van Dyke – dancer, choreographer, dance educator, and a pioneer of modern and contemporary dance
- Curtis Waters – musician and songwriter, best known for his single “Stunnin”

== Law ==
- Barbara Hervey (1975) – judge of the Texas Court of Criminal Appeals

== Librarianship ==
- Carrie Lougee Broughton – State Librarian of North Carolina
- Wanda Kay Brown (MLS 1983) – president of the American Library Association
- Mary Peacock Douglas (A.B. 1923) – librarian and author
- Genevieve Oswald (DFA 1978) – dance archivist at the New York Public Library

== Literature and journalism ==
- Penny Abernathy (1972) – journalist
- Kent Anderson (BA) – novelist
- Bonnie Angelo (1944) – journalist and author
- Julianna Baggott (MA) – novelist, essayist, and poet
- Denis Baker – novelist and short story writer
- Brad Barkley – novelist
- Lynne Barrett (MFA) – writer and editor
- John Baskin – writer and editor
- Ruth Bellamy (BA 1928) – writer
- Linda Carter Brinson (MFA 1987) – editor, writer, and journalist
- Kathryn Stripling Byer (MFA) – poet and teacher; North Carolina Poet Laureate 2005–2009
- Greg Campbell – journalist, documentary filmmaker, and nonfiction author
- Wiley Cash (MA) – author
- Kelly Cherry (MFA 1967) – Poet Laureate of Virginia 2010–2012
- Christina Duhig (MFA) – poet
- Camille Dungy (MFA) – poet
- Pam Durban – novelist and short story writer
- Claudia Emerson (MFA 1991) – Pulitzer Prize-winning author
- Kerri French (MFA 2006) – poet
- Janice Moore Fuller (MA and Ph.D.) – poet and playwright
- Daisy Hendley Gold – author, poet, and journalist
- Bertha Harris – lesbian feminist author
- Harry Humes (MFA 1967) – poet, short-story writer, and professor at Kutztown University of Pennsylvania 1968–1999
- Sarah Lindsay (MFA) – poet
- Kelly Link (MFA) – author who has won a Hugo Award, three Nebula Awards, and a World Fantasy Award
- Robert Morgan (MFA 1968) – poet and novelist, author of Gap Creek, selected by Oprah's Book Club
- Keith Lee Morris (MFA) – author of The Dart League King, The Greyhound God, and The Best Seats in the House
- Sarah Rose Nordgren (MFA) – poet and winner of Agnes Lynch Starrett Poetry Prize
- Karen L. Parker (non-degreed) – journalist
- Lettie Hamlet Rogers (BA 1940) – novelist
- Stephanie Rogers (MFA 2007) – poet
- William Pitt Root – poet
- Margaret Rowlett (1925) – writer of children's books; artist known for fabrics made for children's clothing
- Eve Shelnutt (MFA) – poet
- George Singleton (MFA) – author of short stories, novels, and nonfiction
- Mary Ellen Snodgrass (1966) – author and two-time New York Public Library award winner
- Jan Cox Speas (1995) – short story author and novelist
- Gabriel Spera (MFA) – poet
- Julia Montgomery Street (1923) – poet, playwright and author
- Eleanor Ross Taylor (1940) – poet
- Sylvia Wilkinson (1962) – author

== Military ==
- Mildred Inez Caroon Bailey (1940) – United States Army general

== Politics and public life ==
- Cynthia Ball (BA) – North Carolina House of Representatives
- James Brochin (BA 1986) – Maryland Senate
- Gertrude Sprague Carraway – 22nd president general of the Daughters of the American Revolution
- J. P. Carter (MA) – mayor of Madison, North Carolina
- Ashton Clemmons (Ph.D.) – North Carolina House of Representatives
- Katie G. Dorsett (Ph.D.) – North Carolina Senate and Secretary of Administration of North Carolina
- John Faircloth (MA) – North Carolina House of Representatives
- Sue Ramsey Johnston Ferguson (1918) – North Carolina Senate
- Ada Fisher (BS) – Republican National Committeewoman for the state of North Carolina
- Dale Folwell (BS and MS) – North Carolina House of Representatives and North Carolina state treasurer
- Virginia Foxx (MA and EdD) – United States Congress
- Bill Gardner (BA) – New Hampshire secretary of state
- Michael Garrett (BA 2007) – North Carolina Senate
- Patricia Wright Gwyn (MLS) – first woman to serve as chair of the Rockingham County Board of Commissioners
- Martha Blakeney Hodges (BA 1918) – First Lady of North Carolina
- Ruby Hooper (BA 1945) – first woman to run for governor of North Carolina
- Kathy Hoyt – Vermont House of Representatives and chief of staff to Vermont governors Madeleine Kunin and Howard Dean
- Maggie Jeffus (MEd 1970) – North Carolina House of Representatives
- Margaret French McLean – First Lady of North Carolina
- Mark Robinson (2022) – 35th lieutenant governor of North Carolina
- Yolanda Hill Robinson (BA and MS) – Second Lady of North Carolina
- Angel Joy Chavis Rocker – first black woman to run for president of the United States as a Republican
- Grace Taylor Rodenbough (MEd) – member of the North Carolina House of Representatives
- Jessie Rae Scott – First Lady of North Carolina
- Mary White Scott – First Lady of North Carolina
- Sarah Stevens (BS) – North Carolina House of Representatives
- Al Stewart (MA) – acting United States secretary of labor
- Terry Sullivan (non-degreed) – political consultant and campaign manager for Marco Rubio's 2016 presidential campaign
- Larry W. Womble (MEd 1977) – North Carolina House of Representatives
- Stephen W. Wood (MA) – North Carolina House of Representatives

== Science and medicine ==
- Norman Anderson (MA and Ph.D. in psychology) – CEO of the Psychological Association
- Mary Eugenia Kapp (AB 1931) – chemist with DuPont de Nemours and professor
- Jaylee Burley Mead (BA 1951) – astronomer at Goddard Space Flight Center
- Rose Morton (BA 1948) – mathematician known for her work in fluid mechanics at the David Taylor Model Basin
- Vincent Rue – psychotherapist and advocate for government bans on abortion

== Social work ==
- Zung Wei-tsung (BA 1919) – social worker, educator, and leader of the YWCA in China who worked on child labor regulation, and working conditions for women

== Sports ==
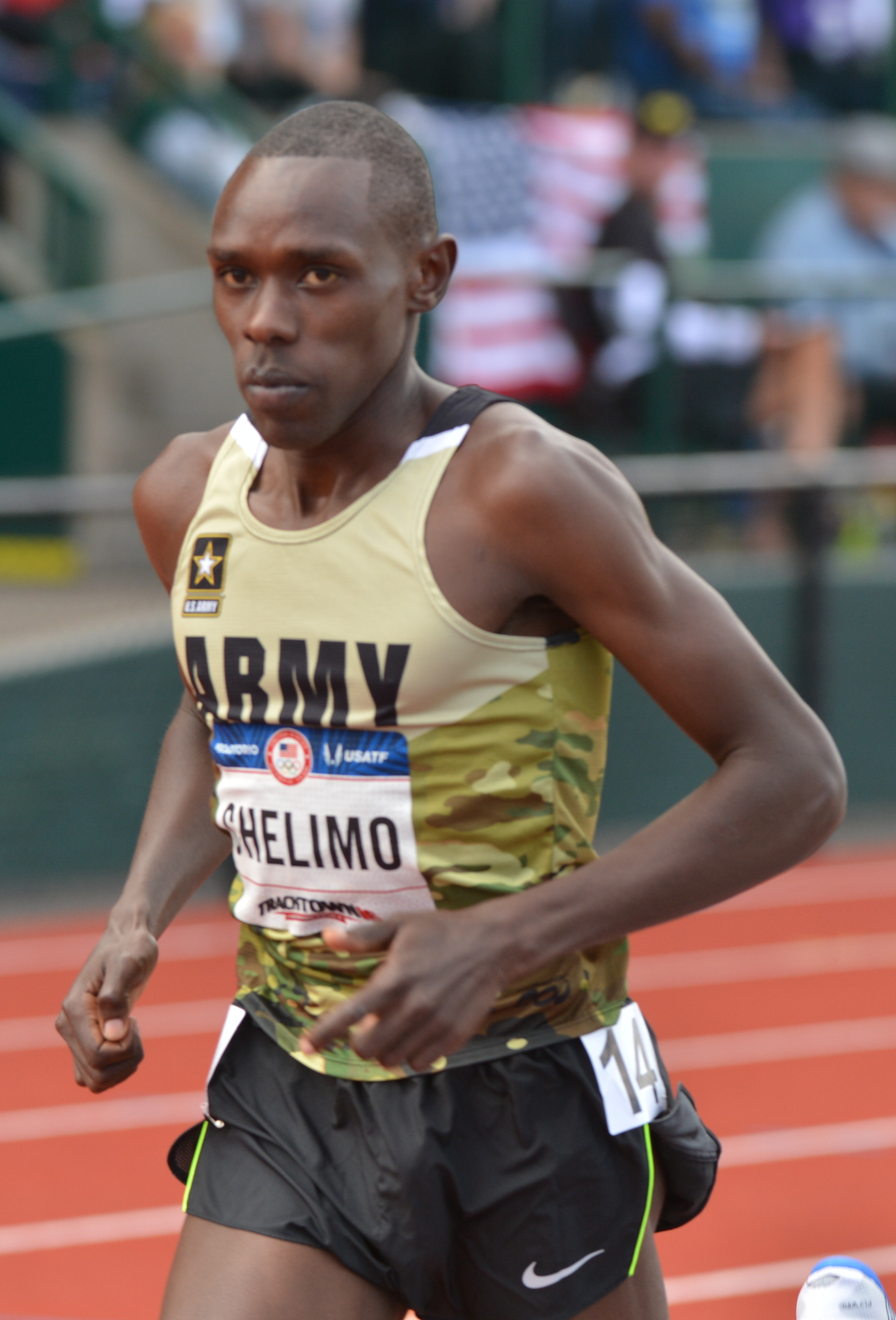
Paul Chelimo

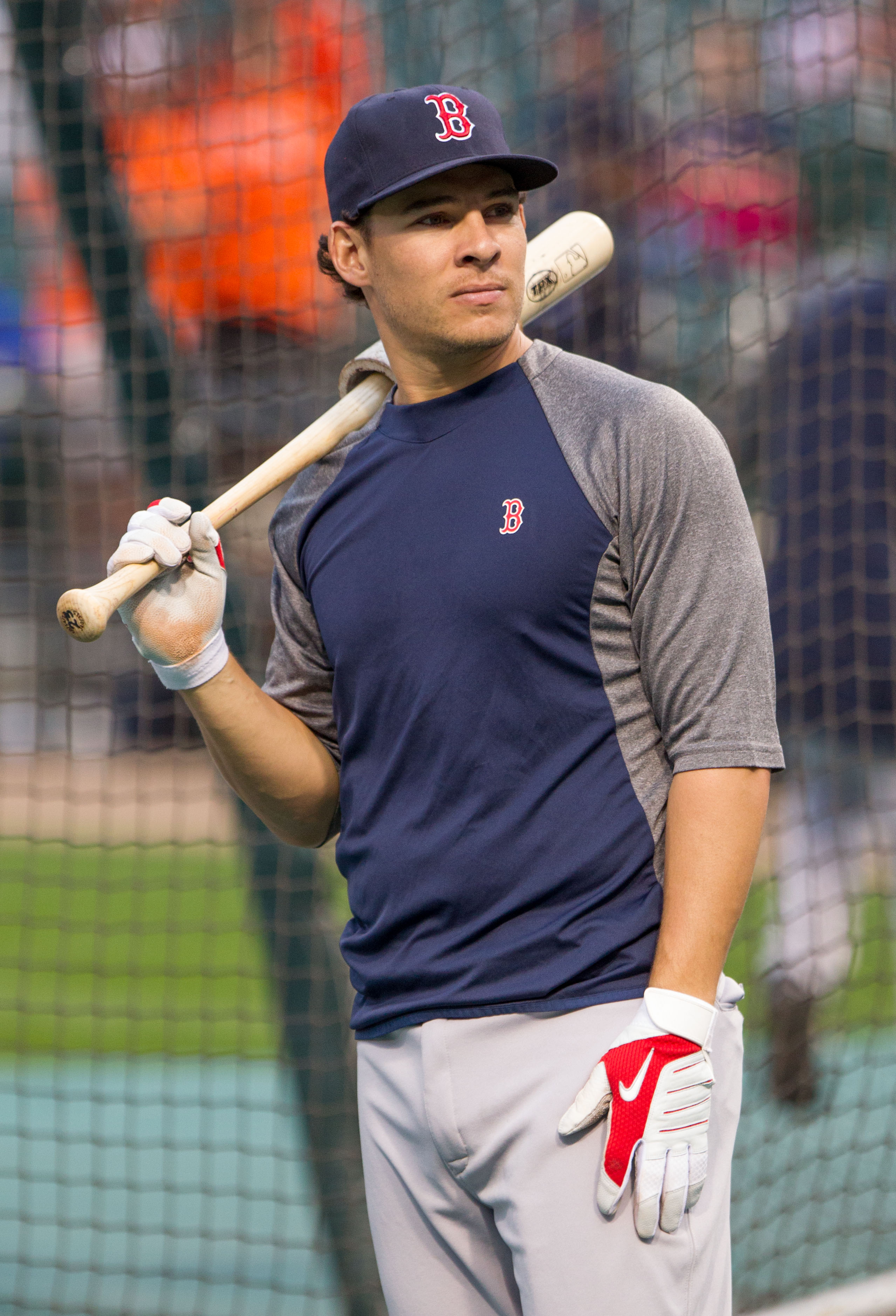
Danny Valencia

- Angelo Allegri – professional basketball player
- Francis Alonso (2019) – professional basketball player
- Gerry Austin (Ph.D.) – National Football League referee
- Kenny Bundy (2003) – soccer player and coach
- Marge Burns (1948) – professional golfer
- Ronnie Burrell – professional basketball player
- Paul Chelimo – 2016 Summer Olympics silver medalist at 5000 meters in track and field
- Théo Collomb – professional soccer player
- James Dickey – basketball player for Hapoel Haifa of the Israeli Basketball Premier League
- Tracy Ducar (1995) – professional soccer player
- Sigurður Ragnar Eyjólfsson – professional soccer player
- Mike Gailey (1991) – professional soccer player
- Kyrin Galloway (2020) – professional basketball player
- Fernando Garcia – professional soccer player
- Eli Garner – professional soccer player
- Dot Germain – professional golfer
- Chris Goos – professional soccer player
- JoAnne Graf (MA 1978) – college softball coach and associate professor in sport management
- Emmanuel Hagan – professional soccer player
- Doug Hamilton – professional soccer president and general manager
- DeLana Harvick – co-owner and manager of Kevin Harvick Incorporated, a racing team in NASCAR's Nationwide and Camping World Truck Series
- Jason Haupt – professional soccer player
- Ricky Hickman – professional basketball player in Israel for Maccabi Tel Aviv
- Kyle Hines – professional basketball player
- Ricky Hickman (2007) – professional basketball player
- Alvin James (nondegreed) – professional soccer player
- Brian Japp – professional soccer player and coach
- Betty Jaynes (BS 1967) – college basketball coach inducted into the Women's Basketball Hall of Fame
- Jamel James Johnson (non-degreed) – professional soccer player
- Scott Jones – professional soccer player
- Mikko Koivisto (2010) – professional basketball player
- Jordy Kuiper (2018) – professional basketball player
- Kayel Locke – professional basketball player
- Carol Mann – professional golf player and member of the LPGA Hall of Fame
- Marco Milanese – professional soccer player
- Isaiah Miller – professional basketball player
- Brian Moehler – professional baseball player
- Nadine Mohamed – basketball player
- Alejandro Moreno (2002) – professional soccer player and ESPN soccer analyst
- Becky Morgan (BA 1997) – professional golfer
- Grayson Murray – professional golfer
- Kevin Nanney (B.A. psychology) – professional Super Smash Bros. player
- J.C. Ngando – professional soccer player
- Ty Outlaw – professional basketball player
- Randi Patterson (2006) – soccer player
- Nick Paulos – professional basketball player
- Chris Petrucelli – professional soccer coach
- Rusty Pierce – professional soccer player
- Max Povse – professional baseball player
- Eddie Radwanski (1984) – professional soccer player
- Kyle Randall (non-degreed) – professional basketball player and coach
- Jeff Reynolds (1978) – college basketball coach
- Tevon Saddler (non-degreed) – college basketball coach
- Michael Self – professional stock car racing driver
- Karin Sendel (non-degreed) – Israeli women's footballer
- Trevis Simpson – professional basketball player
- Jessamyn Stanley – yoga teacher and body positivity activist
- Shonda Stanton – college softball coach
- Michelle Thompson – member of the US national taekwondo team, 1993 and 1994 NCTA bantamweight champion
- Danny Valencia – professional baseball player
- Andrew Wantz – professional baseball player
- Kay Yow (MS 1970) – head coach of the NC State Wolfpack women's basketball team, member of the Naismith Hall of Fame
