= Best New Poets =

Poetry anthology

The Best New Poets series consists of annual poetry anthologies, each containing fifty poems from poets without a previously published collection. The first edition of the series appeared in 2005, and was published, as all later editions have been, by Samovar Press. In 2006, the University of Virginia Press began distributing the anthology.

== Selection and editors ==
Poems are nominated for the series by creative writing programs and literary magazines, though poets can also self-nominate through an online submission system. The poems to be included in the anthology are selected by a guest editor. Previous guest editors include George Garrett (2005), Eric Pankey (2006), Natasha Trethewey (2007), Mark Strand (2008), Kim Addonizio (2009), Claudia Emerson (2010), D. A. Powell (2011), Matthew Dickman (2012), Brenda Shaughnessy (2013), Dorianne Laux (2014) Tracy K. Smith. (2015), Mary Szybist (2016), Natalie Diaz (2017), Kyle Dargan (2018), Cate Marvin (2019), Brian Teare (2020), Kaveh Akbar (2021), Paula Bohince (2022), Anna Journey (2023), Anders Carlson-Wee (2024), and Cecily Parks (2025).

== Selected poets ==
The series, begun by University of Virginia professor Jeb Livingood in 2005 (edited by poet Jazzy Danziger from 2011 to 2015), has published a number of notable writers since its inception, including Diana Vlavianos, Deborah Ager, Craig Blais, Christina Duhig, Cynthia Lowen, Lisa Gluskin Stonestreet, Jennifer Militello, Kerri French, Seth Abramson, Stephanie Rogers, Rhett Iseman Trull, Anna Journey (2008 National Poetry Series winner), Zach Savich (2008 Iowa Poetry Prize winner), Michael McGriff (2007 Agnes Lynch Starrett Poetry Prize winner), Julie Larios (2006 Pushcart Prize winner), Alysia Nicole Harris, recent Stegner Fellows Keith Ekiss, Robin Ekiss, Kai Carlson-Wee, Edgar Kunz, Chelsea Bunn, Martha Greenwald, Dina Hardy, Sara Michas-Martin, Peter Kline, and Kimberly Grey, as well as Tarfia Faizullah, Ocean Vuong, Sam Sax, Leila Chatti, Phillip B. Williams, Tiana Clark, Peter LaBerge, Jameson Fitzpatrick, Fatimah Asghar, Anders Carlson-Wee, and Kaveh Akbar. To date, the youngest poet to be included in the series is Genevieve Watson (2025), who was included as a high school junior.

== Books ==
- George P. Garrett; Jeb Livingood, eds. (2005). Best New Poets, 2005. Samovar Press. ISBN 978-0-9766296-0-3.
- Eric Pankey; Jeb Livingood, eds. (2006). Best New Poets, 2006. Samovar Press. ISBN 978-0-9766296-1-0.
- Natasha Trethewey; Jeb Livingood, eds. (2007). Best New Poets, 2007. Samovar Press. ISBN 978-0-9766296-2-7.
- Mark Strand; Jeb Livingood, eds. (2008). Best New Poets, 2008: 50 Poems from Emerging Writers. Samovar Press. ISBN 978-0-9766296-3-4.
- Kim Addonizio; Jeb Livingood, eds. (2009). Best New Poets, 2009: 50 Poems from Emerging Writers. Samovar Press. ISBN 978-0-9766296-4-1.
- Claudia Emerson; Jeb Livingood, eds. (2010). Best New Poets, 2010: 50 Poems from Emerging Writers. Samovar Press. ISBN 978-0-9766296-5-8.
- D.A. Powell; Jazzy Danziger; Jeb Livingood, eds. (2011). Best New Poets, 2011: 50 Poems from Emerging Writers. Samovar Press. ISBN 978-0-9766296-6-5.
- Matthew Dickman; Jazzy Danziger, eds. (2012). Best New Poets, 2012: 50 Poems from Emerging Writers. Samovar Press. ISBN 978-0-9766296-7-2.
- Brenda Shaughnessy; Jazzy Danziger, eds. (2013). Best New Poets, 2013: 50 Poems from Emerging Writers. Samovar Press. ISBN 978-0-9766296-8-9.
- Dorianne Laux; Jazzy Danziger, eds. (2014). Best New Poets, 2014: 50 Poems from Emerging Writers. Samovar Press. ISBN 978-0-9766296-9-6.
- Tracey K Smith, Jazzy Danziger, eds. (2015) Best New Poets 2015: 50 Poems from Emerging Writers. Samovar Press. ISBN 978-0692420096.
- Mary Szybist, Jeb Livingood and Angie Hogan, eds. (2016) Best New Poets 2016: 50 Poems from Emerging Writers. Samovar Press. ISBN 978-0997562309.
- Natalie Diaz, Jeb Livingood eds. (2017) Best New Poets 2017: 50 Poems from Emerging Writers. Samovar Press. ISBN 978-0997562316.
- Kyle Dargan, Jeb Livingood eds. (2018) Best New Poets 2018: 50 Poems from Emerging Writers. Samovar Press. ISBN 978-0997562323.
- Cate Marvin, Jeb Livingood eds. (2019) Best New Poets 2019: 50 Poems from Emerging Writers. Samovar Press. ISBN 978-0997562330.
- Brian Teare, Jeb Livingood eds. (2020) Best New Poets 2020: 50 Poems from Emerging Writers. Samovar Press. ISBN 978-0997562347.
- Kaveh Akbar, Jeb Livingood eds. (2021) Best New Poets 2021: 50 Poems from Emerging Writers. Samovar Press. ISBN 978-0997562354.
- Paula Bohince, Jeb Livingood eds. (2022) Best New Poets 2022: 50 Poems from Emerging Writers. Samovar Press. ISBN 978-0997562361.
- Anna Journey, Jeb Livingood eds. (2023) Best New Poets 2023: 50 Poems from Emerging Writers. Samovar Press. ISBN 978-0997562385.
- Anders Carlson-Wee, Jeb Livingood eds. (2024) Best New Poets 2024: 50 Poems from Emerging Writers. Samovar Press. Forthcoming.

== Critical response ==
Of the 2013 edition, Publishers Weekly wrote:

The work, much of it nominated by university writing programs and literary journals, is diverse in voice and subject matter, providing an effective barometer of contemporary American poetry...The poems seem to owe as much to 20th-century traditions as to the spirit of invention, and, as such, are a reminder that contemporary poetry is not only alive and well but continuing to evolve.

According to The Virginia Quarterly Review:

The youthfulness of the anthology, combined with the wide scope of its contents, is apparent in the poems, which are edgy and daring. Emerging, whether intentionally or not, as a younger sibling to the Best American Poetry anthologies, this series breaks new ground and provides fresh treasures.

Poet and critic David Wojahn has said of the series,

It's a nervy thing for an anthology to label itself Best New Poets, but...this collection lives up to its name. It's a rich and readable selection, reflecting no party-line aesthetic, and attesting to the formidable promise of the emerging generation."

Of the 2006 edition, ForeWord Magazine wrote,

With an alert ear for new voices, this anthology offers a different kind of validation: that of being well-heard. The result is a vibrant smorgasbord..."
