= Alysia Nicole Harris =

American poet based out of Atlanta

Alysia Nicole Harris is an American poet based out of Atlanta. She is a Cave Canem fellow, was twice nominated for the Pushcart Prize, and won the Stephen Dunn Poetry Prize in 2014 and 2015. She has performed spoken word poetry in Germany, Canada, Slovakia, South Africa, and the UK, and at the United Nations.

== Poetry ==
Harris's poem "Crow's Sugar" was featured in the 2015 edition of Best New Poets. She was featured in the anthology The BreakBeat Poets: New American Poetry in the Age of Hip Hop, which the Huffington Post describes as a “‘mixtape’ spanning the time from Hip Hop's birth to its explosion.” She is the author of How Much We Must Have Looked Like Stars to Stars. Her work has appeared in Indiana Review, Solstice Literary Magazine, and Vinyl Poetry.

Harris is a founding member of the performance poetry collective The Strivers Row.

== Other work ==
In 2015, Harris was selected as the Duncanson Artist-in-Residence at the Taft Museum of Art in Cincinnati.

Harris is an editor-in-chief of the Southern new media publication Scalawag Magazine, which strives to spark “critical conversations about the many Souths where we live, love, and struggle.” It publishes fiction as well as critical essays, political journalism, and poetry. In an article in The New York Times discussing new Southern alternative media, Harris was quoted thusly: “The South is not this homogenous place – it has a deep history, a really full history, and one that’s not just for the upper class... The demographics are changing. And ultimately, we believe that the South is going to be the voice that emerges to lead this conversation about trauma and healing, because here is where the trauma was the thickest.”
