= M12 =

M12 or M-12 or M.12 may refer to:

== Automobiles ==
- BMW M12, a turbocharged 1500 cc four-cylinder Formula One engine of the 1980s
- McLaren M12, a racing car for the Can-Am series
- Mercedes-AMG F1 M12 E Performance, a 2021-spec Formula One power unit
- Noble M12, a British sports car
- Vector M12, an automobile made by Vector Supercars

== Aviation ==
- Beriev Be-12, Soviet Naval Designation M-12, a Soviet amphibious aircraft
- Grigorovich M-12, an improved version of the Grigorovich M-11, a Russian single-seat fighter flying boat designed by Dmitry Pavlovich Grigorovich
- Macchi M.12, a flying boat bomber produced in small numbers in Italy in 1918
- Miles M.12 Mohawk, a 1930s British two-seat, tandem cabin monoplane

== Military technology and weapons ==
- Armor, Vest, M12, developed in 1945 and used in the Korean War, was a 12-pound aluminum and nylon vest protecting against low-velocity fragments.
- Beretta M12, a sub-machine gun by Italian designer Beretta
- Doppelpistole M.12, a double-barrel submachine gun based on the Steyr M1912 semi-automatic pistol, developed by the Austrian firm Steyr Mannlicher
- Krupp 10.5 cm Haubitze M.12, a German howitzer used by Romania in World War I
- M12 Gun Motor Carriage, an American self-propelled artillery model
- Winchester Model 1912, a shotgun
- Zastava M12 Black Spear, a 12.7mm caliber anti-materiel rifle developed by Zastava Arms

== Roads ==
- M-12 (Michigan highway), a former designation for part of U.S. Route 2
- M12 motorway, in County Armagh, Northern Ireland
- M12 motorway (Great Britain), a proposed but never built motorway in southern England
- M12 Motorway (Sydney), Australia
- M12 highway (Russia)
- M-12 motorway (Pakistan) still under construction in Punjab, Pakistan
- M12 (East London), a Metropolitan Route in East London, South Africa
- M12 (Cape Town), a Metropolitan Route in Cape Town, South Africa
- M12 (Pretoria), a Metropolitan Route in Pretoria, South Africa
- M12 (Durban), a Metropolitan Route in Durban, South Africa
- M12 (Bloemfontein), a Metropolitan Route in Bloemfontein, South Africa
- M12 (Port Elizabeth), a Metropolitan Route in Port Elizabeth, South Africa
- M12 road (Zambia), a road in Zambia
- M12 road (Malawi), a road in Malawi
- Highway M12 (Ukraine), connecting Lviv Oblast to Central Ukraine

== Space ==
- Messier 12, a globular cluster in the constellation Ophiuchus
- Progress M-12, a Russian unmanned cargo spacecraft launched in 1992 to resupply the Mir space station
- Progress M-12M, an unmanned Progress spacecraft that was lost in a launch failure in August 2011

== Other ==
- M12 (artist collective), a Colorado-based artist collective
- M12 (Istanbul Metro), a rail line under construction in Istanbul, Turkey
- M12 (New York City bus), a New York City Bus route in Manhattan
- M12 (venture capital), a venture capital subsidiary of Microsoft
- M12 bolt, a size of ISO metric screw thread
- M12 connector, a size of IEC metric screw sized electrical connector
- Mathieu group M_{12}, in the mathematical field of group theory
- Magic 2012, the thirteenth core set in Magic: The Gathering
- S-mount (CCTV lens), a CCTV lens mount using a M12x0.5 thread
- M12, a difficulty grade in mixed climbing
