= Cecily Parks =

American poet and professor

Dr. Cecily Parks
- Occupations: Poet and professor
- Awards: 2016 Pushcart Prize winner

Academic background
- Education: Rice University (BA); Johns Hopkins Writing Seminars (MA); Columbia University (MFA); CUNY Graduate Center (PhD)

Academic work
- Discipline: English
- Institutions: Texas State University
- Website: https://faculty.txst.edu/profile/1922061

Cecily Parks is an American poet and professor. She is author of three poetry collections: The Seeds (Alice James Books, 2025); O’Nights (Alice James Books, 2015); and Field Folly Snow (University of Georgia Press, 2008).

== Biography ==
Parks was born in 1976. She attended Rice University and graduated in 1999. As an undergraduate, Parks contributed reporting to The Rice Thresher and developed an interest in poetry during her senior year after taking a workshop. Following her graduation, she received her MA in poetry from the Johns Hopkins Writing Seminars in 2000.

Parks later earned her Master of Fine Arts in poetry at Columbia University and received her PhD at Graduate Center of the City University of New York, where she wrote a dissertation on American women writers and swamps.

In 2020, Parks contributed spoken-word poetry to Stuart Hyatt's album Ultrasonic on the closing track, “Between the Hawthorn and Extinction.” The song was described by Tony Rehagen of Indianapolis Monthly as a "spoken-word ode to the endangered [Indiana] bat that leans toward lament." The poem was previously published in Orion under the title "The Indiana Bats."

She currently lives in Austin, Texas, where she is an associate professor at the Texas State University MFA program for creative writing.

== Honors and awards ==
- 2005: New York Chapbook Fellowship
- 2008: Finalist, Norma Farber First Book Award
- 2016: Pushcart Prize
- 2019: The Writer Magazine/Emily Dickinson Award
- 2022, 2021, 2020 inclusions in The Best American Poetry
- 2026: Finalist, PEN/Voelcker Award for Poetry

== Published works ==
=== Poetry collections ===
- Parks, C. G. (2025). The Seeds. New Gloucester, Maine: Alice James Books.
- Parks, C. (2015). O’Nights. Farmington, Maine: Alice James Books.
- Parks, C. (2008). Field Folly Snow. Athens, Georgia: University of Georgia Press.

=== Chapbooks ===
- Parks, C. (2005). Cold Work. New York, New York: Poetry Society of America.

=== Anthologies edited ===
- Parks, C. (2025). Best New Poets 2025. Charlottesville, Virginia: University of Virginia Press.
- Parks, C. (2016). The Echoing Green: Poems of Fields, Meadows, and Grasses. New York, New York, United States: Everyman's Library Pocket Poets.
