= Jennifer Militello =

American poet and professor

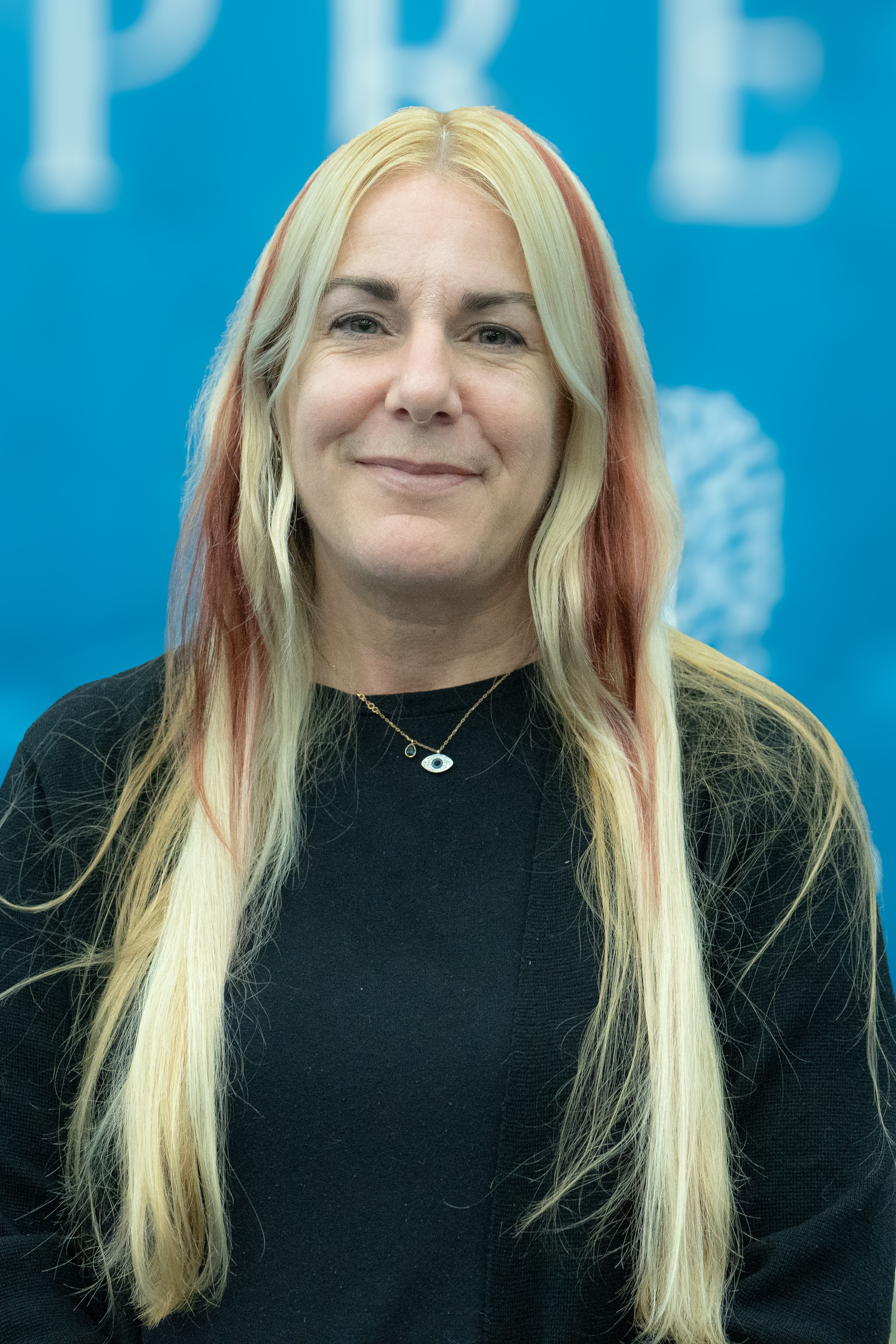
- Militello at AWP 2026
- Born: New York City
- Writing career
- Genre: Poetry
- Notable awards: Alice Fay di Castagnola Award

Jennifer Militello is an American poet and professor. She is author of the award-winning memoir Knock Wood which appeared from Dzanc Books in 2019, and five collections of poetry including The Pact, Tupelo Press, 2021. Her first full-length collection of poetry, Flinch of Song, was published in 2009 by Tupelo Press, and won the Tupelo Press/Crazyhorse First Book Prize.

Her second collection, Body Thesaurus, was named a finalist for the Poetry Society of America's Alice Fay di Castagnola Award by Marilyn Hacker in 2010. Her third book A Camouflage of Specimens and Garments was a finalist for the Eric Hoffer Book Award and the Sheila Margaret Motton Prize. Her chapbook Anchor Chain, Open Sail appeared from Finishing Line Press in 2006.

Militello was named the Poet Laureate of New Hampshire in 2024.

== Life ==
Militello was born in New York City and raised in Rhode Island. She has taught at Brown University, the Rhode Island School of Design, and the University of Massachusetts Lowell. She is currently teaching in the MFA program at New England College, and living in Goffstown, New Hampshire.

Her poetry can be found in literary journals and magazines including AGNI, American Poetry Review, The Kenyon Review, The New Republic, The North American Review, The Paris Review, Poetry, Tin House, The Virginia Quarterly Review, Boston Review and in anthologies including Best New Poets (University of Virginia Press).

== Awards ==
Militello's honors include grants and fellowships from the New Hampshire State Council on the Arts, the Barbara Deming Memorial Fund, Writers at Work, and the Millay Colony for the Arts. She is a Ruskin Art Club Poetry Award recipient and five-time Pushcart Prize nominee.

== Works ==
- Flinch of Song, Tupelo Press; November 1, 2009, ISBN 1932195769
- Body Thesaurus, Tupelo Press, May 31, 2013, ISBN 978-1936797288
- A Camouflage of Specimens and Garments, Tupelo Press, May 1, 2016, ISBN 978-1-936797-75-2
- Knock Wood, Dzanc Books, August 29, 2019, ISBN 978-1-945814-96-9
