= Stuart Hyatt =

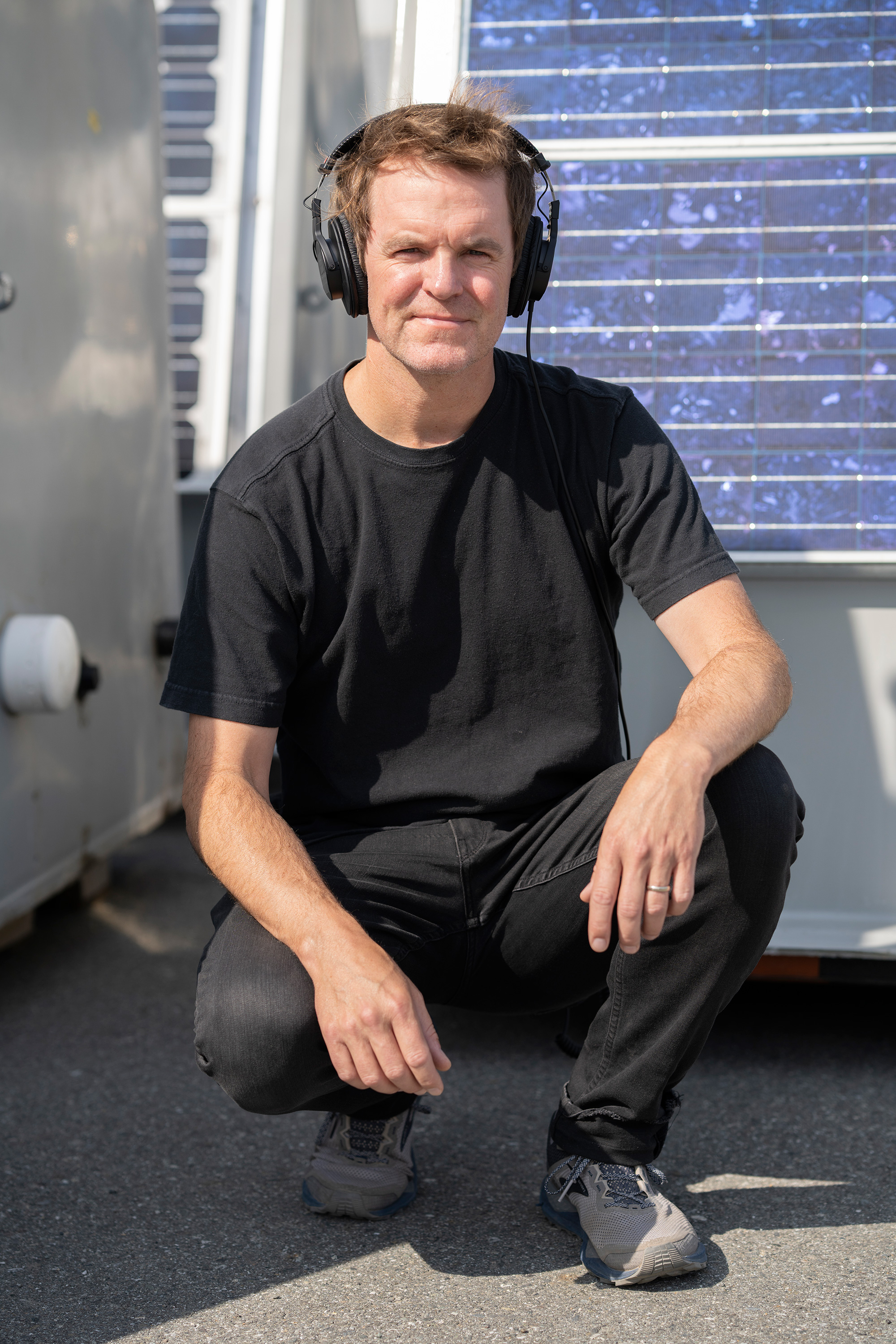

Background information
- Born: November 18, 1974 (age 51)
- Origin: Indianapolis, Indiana, United States
- Occupations: Musician, composer, producer, multimedia artist
- Years active: 2005–present
- Labels: TEAM Records, Innova Recordings, Temporary Residence Limited, DFA Records
- Website: http://stuarthyatt.org/

Stuart Hyatt is an American musician and multimedia artist.

== Biography ==
=== Early life ===
Stuart Hyatt was born in Indianapolis, Indiana on November 18, 1974. Between the ages of 3 and 10, Hyatt was trained in playing the violin according to the Suzuki method. At age 10, when the violin instructor started to introduce reading sheet music, Hyatt lost interest in further lessons. Hyatt attended the Broad Ripple High School for the Arts and Humanities, located in Indianapolis. A fellow student at the school lent a 4-track cassette recorder to Hyatt, whereupon Hyatt started recording music in layers and experimenting with sound.

=== Education ===
Hyatt studied Visual Arts at Eckerd College in St. Petersberg, Florida, where he graduated in 1997. He then obtained a master's degree in Fine Arts at Indiana University. Later, in the early 2010s, he obtained a Master of Architecture degree from Ball State University in Indiana.

=== Early career ===
In this period Hyatt is most well known for two albums, 2005's The Clouds and 2007's Shrimp Attack, for which he composed the music and organized the recording of the songs, which were sung by, respectively, local gospel choirs and amateur singers in Sumter County, Alabama, and a 50-member collective of artists with developmental disabilities at Creative Clay, a nonprofit arts center in St. Petersburg, Florida. The Clouds received a Grammy nomination for Best Recording Package in 2005 for Hyatt's handmade corrugated cardboard CD package. The albums were originally released on Hyatt's own label, TEAM Records, and later re-released by the Minneapolis label Innova Recordings. Hyatt's other releases on TEAM Records have followed a similar community-based approach typified by collectives of nonprofessional musicians organized by Hyatt.

In the year 2023, for the twentieth anniversary of the recording of Hyatt's The Clouds album, DFA Records re-issued a limited edition which was remastered for the first time as a vinyl LP.

Hyatt became a member of the Colorado-based artist collective M12.

== Field Works ==
Field Works is the collaborative project, starting from the 2010s, which is curated and produced by Hyatt, wherein audio field recordings made by Hyatt are combined with the work of experimental musicians, along with material from writers and artists as part of the wider Fields Works project. A major theme in Hyatt's work, which began in his early career, is "to celebrate marginalized communities, at-risk species, and fragile ecosystems."

All of the Field Works albums are released by Temporary Residence Limited.

=== Metaphonics ===
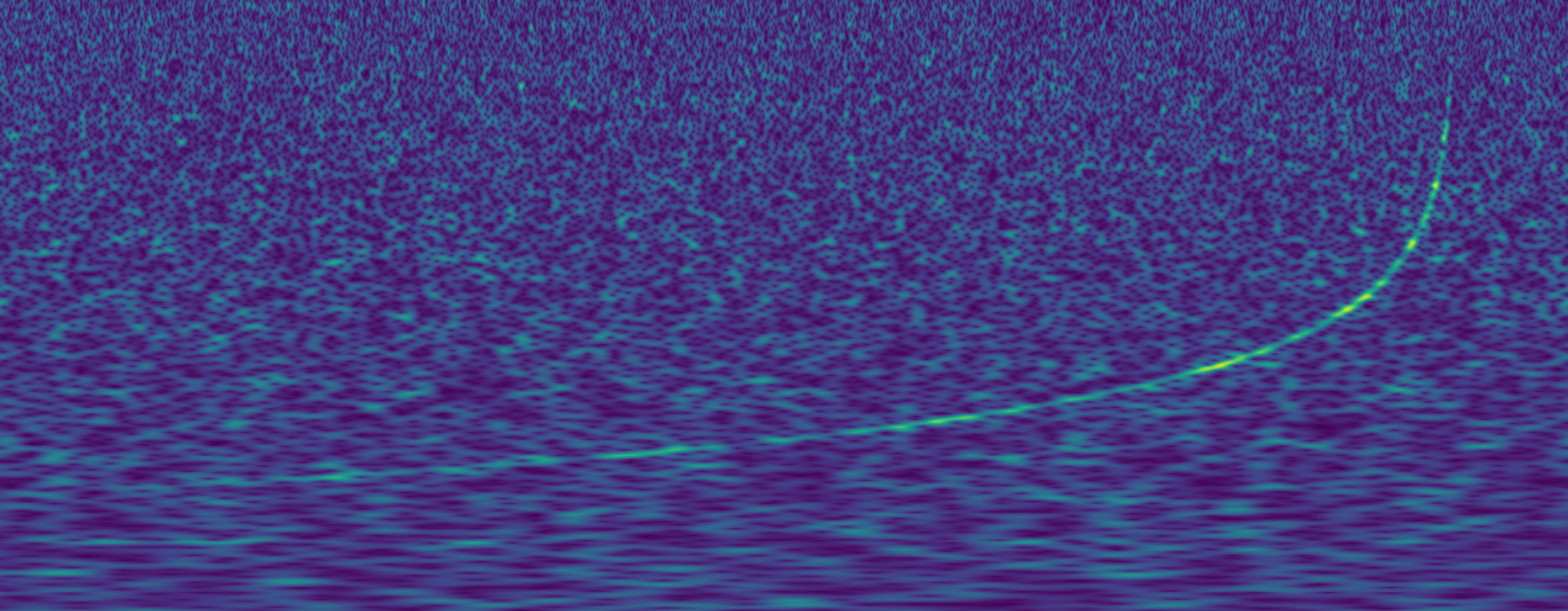
Gravitational wave chirp spectrogram

Metaphonics: The Complete Field Works Recordings, released in 2019, is the combined first seven LPs of Hyatt's work, which combines "site-responsive" music, imagery and texts, and consists of the following albums: Born in the Ear—urban and rural sounds from Lancaster County, Pennsylvania; Pogue's Run—from a waterway in Indianapolis, Indiana; The Fair State—from the Indiana State Fair; Initial Sounds—Part 1: glaciers and volcanoes; Part 2: "chirps" of gravitational waves; Glen Rose Formation—from a cave in Texas; The National Road—sounds from a single street in Indianapolis; book with text and artwork: The Book and Liner Notes: Metaphonics--The Field Works Listener's Guide.

=== Ultrasonic ===
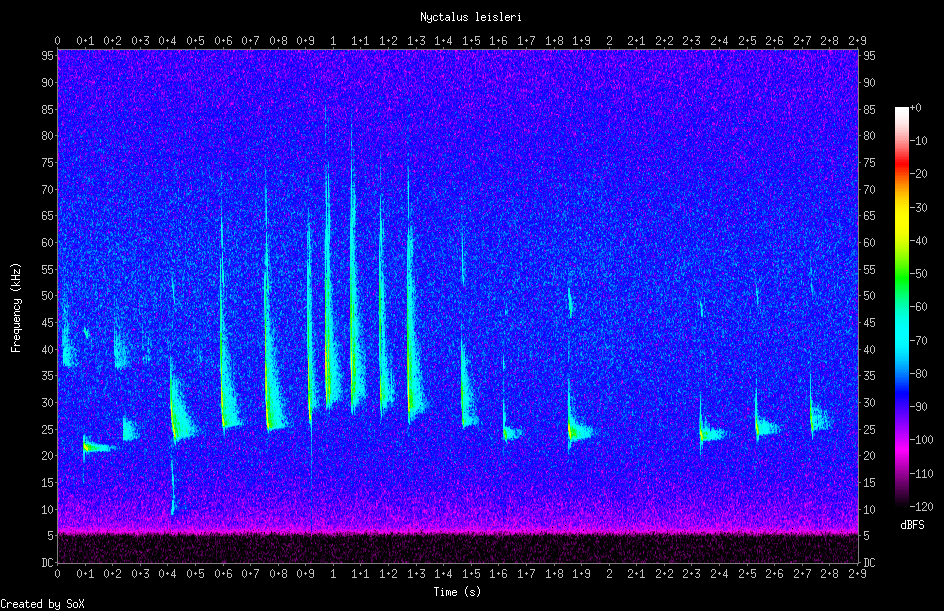
Recording of bat echolocation

In 2020, Hyatt released a music album which combines sounds made by the Indiana bat along with music from ambient and experimental artists. Hyatt recorded the ultrasonic echolocations of the Indiana bat and then modulated the sounds in order to make the sounds audible to humans. This "sound library" of the Indiana bat was sent to musicians who then combined the sounds from the Indiana bat along with original music. Hyatt was quoted as saying that "bat noises are like bird songs, just in a register no one can hear. I wanted to bring out the musicality of their voices." The album is entitled Ultrasonic, and it features music from Eluvium, Machinefabriek, Ben Lukas Boysen and others. The album also features a poem written and read by the poet Cecily Parks about the Indiana bat.

=== Cedars ===
The Cedars album, released in 2021, consists of musical compositions built around chantings of Arabic poetry with Middle Eastern musical motifs in the first half of the album, and recitations of English poetry with an American folk-music style in the second half. In the album, the Lebanese musician Youmna Saba performs her own poems, and the country musician H.C. McEntire reads poems of Todd F. Davis. This album, unlike other works in the Field Works series, is not based on field recordings. Critics have described the album as an "enchanting journey of music and poetry.", and which as a "song cycle examines some of Earth's most iconic and ancient forests."

Hyatt reworked the material from the Cedars album, subtracted the poetry reading, and added a piano as the new "protagonist," along with a "forest soundscape" recorded in the Welsh countryside. This reworked material was released as the album entitled Maples, Ash, and Oaks: Cedars Instrumentals.

=== Stations ===
The Stations album, from 2022, is the tenth volume in the Field Work series. In this album Hyatt returns to field recordings, in this case of the earth itself "with deep hums, translations of seismic data and the subtle sounds of underground resonances" of the earth's "geophony," from the Earthscope experiment in North America. These field recordings are combined with the work of various experimental instrumental music artists, including Hyatt himself, along with vocalist performers.

== Personal life ==
Hyatt lives in Indianapolis, Indiana with his wife and children.

== Published works ==
- Metaphonics. The Field Work's Listener's Guide (2018). Jap Sam Books. (Foreword written by Bernard Krause) ISBN 978-9492852021
- Stations. Listening to the Deep Earth (2022). Jap Sam Books. ISBN 978-9492852359

== Honors, decorations, awards and distinctions ==
- In 2005, Hyatt received an Efroymson Contemporary Arts Fellowship, awarded yearly to artists in the American Midwest to reward creativity and encourage emerging and established artists.
- In 2021 Hyatt was listed as a grantee as a National Geographic Explorer, to help fund the work in recording the "ultrasonic echolocations of endangered bats and the infrasonic rumblings of seismic activity," out of which came the Ultrasonic and Stations albums in the Field Works series.

== See also ==
- Field recording
- Biomusic
