= The Clouds (album) =

Studio album by Stuart Hyatt and Community
- Released: Oct. 26, 2004
- Genre: Pop/rock, gospel, outsider
- Label: Innova Recordings, Team Records, DFA Records
- Producer: Stuart Hyatt

Stuart Hyatt and Community chronology
The Clouds (2004)	Shrimp Attack (2007)

Professional ratings
Review scores
Source	Rating
Allmusic	3/5 stars

The Clouds is an album of gospel music composed and produced by Indianapolis musician and multimedia artist Stuart Hyatt, and performed by local gospel choirs and amateur singers in Sumter County, Alabama.

The Clouds received a Grammy nomination for Best Recording Package in 2005 for Hyatt's handmade corrugated cardboard CD package. The album was originally released on Hyatt's own label, Team Records, and later re-released by Minneapolis label Innova Recordings.

In the year 2023, for the twentieth anniversary of the recording of Hyatt's The Clouds album, DFA Records re-issued a limited edition which was remastered for the first time as a vinyl LP.

== Track listing ==
No.	Title	Length
1.	"Up in the Clouds"	2:36
2.	"Here We Come"	2:49
3.	"No, You Can't Take Them"	4:40
4.	"How Will I Know?"	3:05
5.	"Filled With Love"	2:28
6.	"Darkness and Light"	3:25
7.	"It's Better Than Before"	3:22
8.	"Up in the Clouds (reprise)"	1:44
