= David St. John =

American poet (born 1949)

- Born: July 24, 1949 (age 77); Fresno, California
- Occupations: poet, professor
- Spouse: Anna Journey

David St. John (born July 24, 1949) is an American poet.

== Biography ==
Born in Fresno, California, he was educated at California State University, Fresno, where he studied with poet Philip Levine, and at the University of Iowa, receiving an M.F.A. in 1974. He is the author of nine books of poetry, including Study for the World's Body: New and Selected Poems (1994), No Heaven (1985), and Hush (1976), as well as a volume of essays, interviews and reviews entitled Where the Angels Come Toward Us. His most recent work is The Last Troubadour (Ecco, 2017).

His awards include the Discover/The Nation prize, the James D. Phelan Prize, the Rome Prize fellowship in literature, and the O.B. Hardison, Jr. Poetry Prize (2001), a career award for teaching and poetic achievement. He has also received several National Endowment for the Arts Fellowships (1976, 1984, 1994) a Guggenheim Fellowship (1994), and a grant from the Ingram Merrill Foundation. His work has been published in many literary magazines, including The New Yorker, Paris Review, Poetry, American Poetry Review, Antaeus, Harper's, and The New Republic, and has been widely anthologized. St. John was judge for the 2009 Cider Press Review Book Award.

St. John has taught creative writing at Oberlin College and Johns Hopkins University. He currently teaches in the English Department at University of Southern California in Los Angeles, where he serves as Chair, and is one of the founding members of the USC PhD in Creative Writing & Literature. In 2017, he was elected a Chancellor of the Academy of American Poets.

He is married to the poet Anna Journey and lives in Venice, California.

== Works ==
=== Poetry ===
- Hush (1976)
- The Shore (1980)
- No Heaven (1985)
- Terraces of Rain: An Italian Sketchbook (1991)
- Study for the World's Body: New and Selected Poems (1994) (National Book Award finalist)
- In the Pines: Lost Poems 1972–1997 (1999)
- The Red Leaves of Night (1999)
- Prism (2002) (with photographs by Lance Patigian)
- The Face: A Novella in Verse (2004)
- The Auroras (2012)
- The Window (2014)
- The Last Troubadour: Selected and New Poems (2017)
- Prayer for My Daughter (2024)

=== Limited Editions ===
- For Lerida (1973)
- The Olive Grove (1980)
- A Folio of Lost Worlds (1981)
- The Man in the Yellow Gloves (1985)
- The Orange Piano (1987)
- "Peruvian Portals" with mezzotint engravings by artist Holly Downing (2013)

=== Prose ===
- Where the Angels Come Toward Us: Selected Essays, Reviews, and Interviews (1995)
