= Poet Laureate of New Hampshire =

- Incumbent; Jennifer Militello since 2024
- Type: Poet Laureate
- Formation: 1968
- First holder: Paul Scott Mowrer

The poet laureate of New Hampshire is the poet laureate for the U.S. state of New Hampshire.

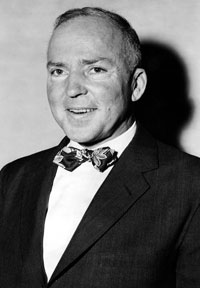
Richard Eberhart was poet laureate in 1979.

== List of poets laureate ==
- Paul Scott Mowrer (1968–1971)
- Eleanor Vinton (1972–1978)
- Richard Eberhart (1979–1984)
- Donald Hall (1984–1989)
- Maxine Kumin (1989–1994)
- Jane Kenyon (1995–1999)
- Donald Hall (1995–1999)
- Marie Harris (1999–2004)
- Cynthia Huntington (2004–2005)
- Patricia Fargnoli (2006–2009)
- Walter E. Butts (2009–2013)
- Alice B. Fogel (2012–2019)
- Alexandria Peary (2019–2024)
- Jennifer Militello (2024–)

== See also ==
- Poet laureate
- List of U.S. state poets laureate
- United States Poet Laureate
