= Jeb Livingood =

American writer

Jeb Livingood is an American essayist, short story writer, editor, and academic.

== Life ==
He graduated from the University of Virginia, American University, George Mason University, and University of Virginia, with an M.F.A. in 2000.

He exhibited at the 1999 Association of Writers & Writing Programs Conference in Albany, New York.

He teaches at the University of Virginia, where he is faculty advisor for Meridian. He is the series editor for the Best New Poets anthology.

He is a commander in the U.S. Coast Guard Reserve.

== Awards ==
- 2002 A.E. Coppard Prize for Long Fiction
- 2001 Finalist Jack Dyer Fiction Prize

== Works ==
- “To Us,” CreamCity Review, Spring 2004.
- "Motion Sickness," The Texas Review, Fall/Winter 2002.
- "Signal Codes" White House Coffee Store Press, November 2002. ASIN: B000CBS0O0 Chapbook
- "Charles Baxter: Fiction Resisting the Corilineal," The Hollins Critic, October 2000.
- "From the Pilot to the Bombardier: An Anecdote on Literary Fame," The Texas Review, Spring/Summer 2001.
- "Oh Albany, My Love," C-ville, March 21, 2000.
- "Overnight Sensation, 1974," Writer's Eye, 1999.
- "The Summer Sea," Yemassee, Spring/Summer 1998.

=== Anthologies ===
- Charles Baxter, John Kulka, Natalie Danford, ed (2001). Best new American voices 2001. Harcourt. ISBN 978-0-15-601065-8.

=== Editor ===
- George P. Garrett, Jeb Livingood, ed (2005). Best New Poets, 2005. Samovar Press. ISBN 978-0-9766296-0-3.
- Eric Pankey, Jeb Livingood, ed (2006). Best New Poets, 2006. Samovar Press. ISBN 978-0-9766296-1-0.
- Natasha Trethewey, Jeb Livingood, ed (2007). Best New Poets, 2007. Samovar Press. ISBN 978-0-9766296-2-7.
- Mark Strand, Jeb Livingood, ed (2008). Best New Poets, 2008: 50 Poems from Emerging Writers. Samovar Press. ISBN 978-0-9766296-3-4.
- Kim Addonizio, Jeb Livingood, ed (2009). Best New Poets, 2009: 50 Poems from Emerging Writers. Samovar Press. ISBN 978-0-9766296-4-1.
- George Garrett, Going to see the elephant: pieces of a writing life, Jeb Livingood ed, Texas Review Press, 2002, ISBN 978-1-881515-42-5

=== Essay ===
- "Revenge of the Introverts", Computer-Mediated Communication Magazine, Volume 2, Number 4, April 1, 1995
