= Cuzzos =

American rap group

- Also known as: Cuzzosx5
- Origin: Los Angeles, California, U.S.
- Genres: Hip hop; West Coast hip hop
- Years active: 2023–present
- Members: Big I-N-D-O; JassCole; Milly Mo; TeaaWhy; BB

Cuzzos, also known as Cuzzosx5, is an American hip hop music group from Los Angeles, California.

== Members ==
Cuzzos are based in Los Angeles. The group consists of five members: Big I-N-D-O, JassCole, Milly Mo, TeaaWhy, and BB.

== Career ==
Their debut single "Goochie Mayne" was released in 2023. Their debut EP, Stay Safe, was released in 2024.

On Juneteenth in 2024, Cuzzos performed their song "GoldMembers", for the Kendrick Lamar's concert The Pop Out: Ken & Friends at the Kia Forum in Inglewood, California, during the first set by DJ Hed, titled the Act I – DJ Hed & Friends. They were featured in the Calmatic-directed music video for Lamar's song "Squabble Up", from his 2024 album GNX.

== Discography ==
=== Extended Plays ===
- Stay Safe (2024)
