= Katherine A. Rawson =

American cognitive psychologist

Katherine Rawson
- Occupation: Professor of Psychological Sciences
- Awards: Presidential Early Career Award for Scientists and Engineers (2009); Psychonomic Society Outstanding Early Career Award (2014)

Academic background
- Education: University of North Carolina at Greensboro; University of Colorado Boulder

Katherine A. Rawson is an American cognitive psychologist known for her educational research on how to optimize learning, promote effective study strategies, and enhance metacognition. She is Professor in the Department of Psychological Sciences at Kent State University. She is co-editor (with John Dunlosky) of The Cambridge Handbook of Cognition and Education, which surveys research on teaching and study strategies that increase learning.

== Awards ==
Rawson was awarded the Presidential Early Career Award for Scientists and Engineers, in 2009. This award recognizes "some of the finest scientists and engineers who, while early in their research careers, show exceptional potential for leadership at the frontiers of scientific knowledge." President Barack Obama named Rawson one of 100 researchers worthy of the award that year.

Rawson received the Outstanding Early Career Award from the Psychonomic Society in 2014. Her award citation stated that "her prolific research program has both practical significance and theoretical impact on several interrelated problems pertaining to education, strategies that promote effective learning, and the automatization of reading. Her work demonstrates the critical importance of the spacing, timing, and difficulty of retesting on the quality and durability of learning in educationally relevant domains.

== Biography ==
Rawson attended the University of North Carolina at Greensboro where she earned a B.A. degree in Psychology with University Honors (Summa Cum Laude) in 1999. She is a member of Phi Beta Kappa.

Rawson continued her education at the University of Colorado Boulder. She completed her PhD in 2004 under the supervision of Walter Kintsch with her dissertation exploring automaticity in text comprehension. Other research, she conducted with Kintsch focused on factors that improve memory for text. Rawson joined the faculty of Kent State University in 2004 where her research has been supported by the National Science Foundation.

Rawson's research focuses on the cognitive psychology of learning and metacognition. Her experiments often test ways to potentially increase the effectiveness of learning in the classroom. She has done research on a psychological phenomenon known as the testing effect. The testing effect occurs when long-term memory is improved by retrieving to-be-remembered information, as occurs when a person takes a test. Rawson has explored effects of retrieval difficulty by varying the interval between tests and the difficulty of test questions. Her research showed that retrieval of information was improved when the amount of time between each test was longer and the tests were more difficult. These variables raised the average score on the tests and resulted in a better understanding of the topic.

== Representative publications ==
- Dunlosky, J., Rawson, K. A., Marsh, E. J., Nathan, M. J., & Willingham, D. T. (2013). Improving students’ learning with effective learning techniques: Promising directions From cognitive and educational psychology. Psychological Science in the Public Interest, 14(1), 4–58.
- Pyc, M. A., & Rawson, K. A. (2010). Why testing improves memory: Mediator effectiveness hypothesis. Science, 330 (6002), 335.
- Rawson, K. A., & Dunlosky, J. (2011). Optimizing schedules of retrieval practice for durable and efficient learning: How much is enough? Journal of Experimental Psychology: General, 140(3), 283–302.
- Rawson, K.A., Dunlosky, J. & Thiede, K.W. (2000). The rereading effect: Metacomprehension accuracy improves across reading trials. Memory & Cognition 28, 1004–1010
- Rawson, K. A., & Kintsch, W. (2005). Rereading effects depend on time of test. Journal of Educational Psychology, 97 (1), 70-80.
