= Anna Journey =

American poet and essayist (born 1980)

- Born: November 1980 (age 45); Arlington, Virginia, U.S
- Education: Virginia Commonwealth University (M.F.A.); University of Houston (Ph.D.)
- Occupations: Poet; essayist

Anna Journey (born November 1980 in Arlington, Virginia) is an American poet and essayist who was awarded a 2011 National Endowment for the Arts Fellowship in Poetry. She is the author of the essay collection An Arrangement of Skin (Counterpoint Press, 2017) and three books of poems: The Atheist Wore Goat Silk (Louisiana State University Press, 2017), Vulgar Remedies (Louisiana State University Press, 2013), and If Birds Gather Your Hair for Nesting (University of Georgia Press, 2009), the latter of which was selected by Thomas Lux for the National Poetry Series. She teaches creative writing and literature at the University of Southern California, where she is an assistant professor of English.

== Life ==
She graduated from Virginia Commonwealth University with an MFA in creative writing. She taught at Virginia Commonwealth University and served as an associate editor for Blackbird. She earned her Ph.D. in literature and creative writing from the University of Houston, where she served as a poetry editor for Gulf Coast.

Journey is the author of the poetry collection If Birds Gather Your Hair for Nesting (Georgia, 2009), which was selected by Thomas Lux for the National Poetry Series. Film director David Lynch called her book, via Twitter, "magical." Her poetry appears in American Poetry Review, Kenyon Review, FIELD, Gulf Coast, Indiana Review, Shenandoah, Gulf Coast, and Blackbird.

Her critical essay on Sylvia Plath ("'Dragon Goes to Bed With Princess': F. Scott Fitzgerald's Influence on Sylvia Plath") appears in Notes on Contemporary Literature. Her essay, "Lost Vocabularies: On Contemporary Elegy" appears in Parnassus: Poetry in Review. In 2006, Journey discovered the unpublished status of Plath's early sonnet "Ennui" that was published in Blackbird.

She is married to poet David St. John and lives in Venice, California.

== Awards ==
- 2005 Sycamore Review Wabash Prize for Poetry
- Yaddo residency
- 2005 Wabash Prize for Poetry
- Academy of American Poets' Prize
- 2007 Diner Poetry Contest
- 2008 National Poetry Series
- 2011 National Endowment for the Arts Fellowship for Poetry

== Bibliography ==
=== Poetry ===
Collections

- If birds gather your hair for nesting. University of Georgia Press. 2009. ISBN 978-0-8203-3368-7.
- Vulgar remedies. Louisiana State University Press. 2013. ISBN 978-0-8071-5219-5.
- The atheist wore goat silk (Louisiana State University Press, 2017)
- The Judas ear, 2022

List of poems

Title	Year	First published	Reprinted/collected
Unconditional belief in heat	2021	Journey, Anna (June 21, 2021). "Unconditional belief in heat". The New Yorker. 97 (17): 54–55.	

=== Non-fiction ===
- "Review: The World in Repair: Steve Gehrke's The Pyramids of Malpighi", Blackbird, Spring 2005
- "Dragon Goes to Bed with Princess: F. Scott Fitzgerald’s Influence on Sylvia Plath", Notes on Contemporary Literature, 09/01/07
- An Arrangement of Skin (Counterpoint Press, 2017)

=== Critical studies and reviews of Journey's work ===
If birds gather your hair for nesting

- Laurel Maury (May 24, 2009). "If Birds Gather Your Hair for Nesting by Anna Journey". The Los Angeles Times. "Anna Journey's first book of poems, If Birds Gather Your Hair for Nesting (University of Georgia Press: 104 pp., $16.95 paper), is a deeply American debut that deals with the author's Southern childhood and adolescence as a pretty, redheaded girl from the bayou. It's lush with Romanticism: Journey writes with near-perfect pitch about flowers, the suburban eeriness of garden centers, her closeted gay psychiatrist grandfather and the mother who broke her back."
