= Margaret Rowlett =

American writer and fabric designer

Margaret Rowlett (1897-1963) was an American writer of children's book and an artist known for fabrics made for children's clothing.

== Biography ==
Rowlett was born in North Carolina, where she attended school in a log house, picked cotton, and by age 14 worked for three dollars a week in a rag mill. "Cricket", a young girl who appears in Rowlett's books and fabric designs, was based partially on Rowlett's childhood ("Cricket" was a nickname given Rowlett by an uncle).

Rowlett graduated from Woman's College (now the University of North Carolina at Greensboro, or UNCG) in 1925, received her master's degree from Columbia University, and became an elementary school teacher in Scarsdale, New York. She had no formal art training save one six-week course she took while a teacher. She began to paint with her students, and when she took her illustrations to Vogue, Harper's Bazaar, and the Lord and Taylor's department store, they were received enthusiastically.

In 1944 Lord and Taylor commissioned Rowlett to design children's draperies and bedspreads and to paint murals in their toy shop and milk bar. In 1945 Rowlett won a special award for her design "Cricket in the Buggy". Several of her fabric designs were exhibited at the International Textile Exhibition at UNCG in 1945 and at the Modern Museum of Art and Design Exhibition in 1946. Rowlett's line of fabrics known as "Smiling Prints" were developed after her paintings were seen in a New York gallery by a company that made Cohama fabrics; by 1947 the new fabric was available for people to use as material for children's clothing.

Rowlett published two books for children, D is for Daddy (NY: Knopf, 1947) and When Cricket was Little (NY: Aladdin Books, 1948). In addition, she wrote a number of unpublished short stories and poems featuring the character of Cricket. Articles about Rowlett and her work appeared in House Beautiful (January, 1947) and McCall's (October, 1948).

== Selected publications ==
- Rowlett, Margaret (1947-01-01). D is for daddy (1st ed.). Knopf.
- ROWLETT, Margaret (1948). When Cricket was Little. Written and illustrated by M. Rowlett. New York. OCLC 503873820.
