= M12 (artist collective) =

M12 Studio
- Type: Nonprofit organization, Artist Collective
- Headquarters: Colorado
- Region served: Worldwide
- Founder/Director: Richard Saxton
- Key people: Daniel Eck; Todd Bockley; Matthew Fluharty; Kirsten Stoltz; Margo Handwerker; Kristofer Harzinski; Stuart Hyatt; Jared Walters; David Wyrick; Peter de Kan; Josh Garret-Davis; Marc McCay; Mary Welcome; Chris Sauter; George P. Perez; Trent Segura; Brian Cook; Nancy Kwon; Aaron Treher
- Website: http://m12studio.org
- Formerly called: municipalWORKSHOP (2002-2007)

M12, aka M12 STUDIO, is an American artist collective and non-profit organization that features an evolving group of artist practitioners, curators, designers, researchers, and writers. Now based in Colorado, the collective creates artworks, research projects, and education programs that explore rural cultures and landscapes. After meeting at Indiana University in 2000 the collective was initially formed as the municipalWORKSHOP in 2002 in York, Alabama by Richard Saxton when he was an artist-in-residence at the Rural Studio, an architecture studio run by Auburn University. The group evolved into M12 in 2007 when it became incorporated as a non-profit organization. The evolving group of core members have created over 35 projects since the collective's founding. M12 has been featured in numerous publications including Lucy Lippard's 2014 book "Undermining: A Wild Ride Through Land Use, Politics, and Art in the Changing West," the Whitechapel Gallery's 2019 anthology "Documents of Contemporary Art: The Rural" featuring Kirsten Stoltz's essay "A Country Social: M12 on the American High Plains," the 2014 publication "A Decade of Country Hits: Art on the Rural Frontier," as well as Josh Garrett-Davis' 2019 book "What is a Western?" and many more books, publications, and recordings. The artist collective has been featured in a variety of exhibitions including The Breaking Ring, at the Center for Contemporary Arts, Santa Fe, NM; Going with the Flow, SITE Santa Fe, NM; The 13th International Venice Biennale of Architecture, Venice, Italy; The 21st International Art Biennial of Santa Cruz de la Sierra, Bolivia; and Lone Prairie at the Corcoran Gallery of Art, Corcoran School of the Arts and Design; among others. M12 has received a wide variety of awards including from the Andy Warhol Foundation for the Visual Arts; The National Endowment for the Arts; Colorado Creative Industries; The Gates Family Foundation; The Indianapolis Community Foundation; and the Minneapolis Foundation, among others.

== History ==
M12 has exhibited at the 13th International Venice Architecture Biennale, The Kalmar Konstmuseum in Sweden, The Chicago Cultural Center, Franklin Street Works, Wormfarm Institute, The 2011 Australian Biennial (SPACED), The 2010 Biennial of the Americas, The Ewing Gallery of Art and Architecture at the University of Tennessee, The John Michael Kohler Arts Center, The Contemporary Museum in Baltimore, Wall House #2 in the Netherlands, The Irish Museum of Modern Art in Dublin; High Visibility: On Location in Rural American and Indian Country, Fargo, ND; The 21st International Art Biennial of Santa Cruz de la Sierra, Bolivia; Sala Diaz, San Antonio, TX; The Santa Fe Art Institute, NM; The Des Moines Public Art Foundation, Des Moines, IA; Corcoran Gallery of Art, Corcoran School of the Arts and Design in Washington DC; The Center for Contemporary Arts, Santa Fe, NM; IASKA Australian Biennial, Perth, Australia; Biennial of the Americas, Denver, CO; The Kohler Arts Center, WI; The Contemporary Museum, Baltimore, MD; and The Center for Land Use Interpretation, Culver City, CA / Wendover, NV; among others.

municipalWORKSHOP (2002-2007)

The municipalWORKSHOP was created in 2002 by artist Richard Saxton based on an effort to experiment with the concept of a "rural renaissance" within the small town of York, Alabama. This art laboratory aimed to work with municipalities and communities to develop more creative approaches to living in rural America. The organization's first project was called Utility Now!, a series of pedal-powered street-sweepers and utility tricycles and bicycles for city crews to better maintain York.

From 2002 to 2007, the municipalWORKSHOP created public art projects with local communities throughout the United States. Projects range from a Music Integrated Kiosk Environment (M.I.K.E.) produced for the John Michael Kohler Arts Center in Sheboygan, Wisconsin to the AutoTour Vehicle built for the Center for Land Use Interpretation in Wendover, Utah. In 2007, the collective formalized as M12, and expanded its reach to communities in Europe, South America, and Australia.

2007-2011

After formalizing in 2007, Daniel Eck, now Museum Director of the Museum of Art and Archaeology at the University of Missouri; Todd Bockley, now Director of the Bockley Gallery in Minneapolis, Minnesota; and Richard Saxton, now Associate Professor of Sculpture & Post-Studio Practice at the University of Colorado Boulder, incorporated M12 as a nonprofit in the collective's project space EbcoLab in Wisconsin. The collective then shifted its base of operations to Colorado where multiple properties would serve as base of operations between 2007 and 2011 including a property outside of Boulder called Rabbitbrush Ranch and an office space in Denver's Taxi Building. EbcoLab was the site of the collective's first Big Feed project in 2007, the collective returned to the rural west in 2008 for the second Big Feed at Rabbitbrush Ranch.

2011–2017

Between 2011 and 2017, The Feed Store social project served as a primary fieldwork site for M12. Located in Byers, Colorado, The Feed Store functioned as the M12 office, studio, workshop, and an experimental space for rural cultural activities hosting upwards of 200 artists, writers, researchers, and students during operation. The store served as a transcultural connection point between artists and the regional rural residents around Byers, CO hosting more than 20 exhibitions, performances, readings, and over 15 on-site projects. During their tenure at The Feed Store, M12 produced a variety of creative content and hosted 5 collaborative summits. The Feed Store also served as a central station for the University of Colorado Boulder's Art + Rural Environments Field School Program run by Field School Faculty Director and University of Colorado Boulder Professor Richard Saxton. The Art + Rural Environments Field School Program provided students with experience working in alternative art spaces and engaging with rural communities.

2018-2022

In 2018 M12 moved their base of operations to the Conejos Fieldwork Site at Rancho la Florida in Conejos County, Colorado. During the collective's tenure in Conejos County, M12 executed the M12 Studio Landlines Initiative to stimulate collaborative projects with visiting artists, researchers, writers, farmers, ranchers, and landowners in Colorado's San Luis Valley. The Conejos Fieldwork Site provided studio infrastructure for M12, visiting project contributors, and collegiate students within the University of Colorado Boulder's Art + Rural Environments Field School Program. The Landlines initiative culminated in the 2024 LANDLINES: San Luis Valley publication featuring writing and content from 18 artists.

2022–present

M12 is currently operating out of a renovated historic building in Big Springs, Nebraska. They recently hosted their first annual Pasture event at the site in 2024. The collective continues to develop projects worldwide.

== Projects ==
- Last Chance Module Array, is part of the Prairie Module series located in Last Chance, Colorado. The work consists of two cubic forms reminiscent of rural timber-frame structures described as “An ambivalent love song to the fading agricultural plains of centuries past.” The structures are positioned to align with the horizon and various celestial phenomena such as the summer and winter solstices. The work was included in The Colorado Sun's 2024 list of 8 quirky places to visit in Colorado.
- Campito, which re-imagined the sheepherders wagon, initially commissioned by the Biennial of the Americas and subsequently featured in the Spontaneous Interventions exhibition in the U.S. Pavilion of the 13th International Venice Biennale of Architecture.
- Prairie Modules, an ongoing series of architectural sculptures that were first installed on the Indianapolis Cultural Trail in Indianapolis, Indiana. Subsequent modules are situated at the Wormfarm Institute in Reedsburg, Wisconsin and The Experimental Site in Last Chance, Colorado.
- Ornitarium, a bird observatory and social space constructed in Denmark, Australia, created as part of the International Art Space Kellerberrin Australia 2011 site-based Biennial.
- Black Hornet, a four-year project with the Hall family racing team that started in 2010 in Fort Morgan, Colorado and featured in the exhibition "The Black Hornet" at the Galleries of Contemporary Art in Ft. Collins, Colorado.
- Action on the Plains, a NEA-funded artist in residence program that invites artists, writers, and researchers to collaborate with M12 in response to the rural Colorado landscape.
- Gran's University, is a set of temporary classrooms established in collaboration with Kultivator, curriculum aimed to collect and archive rural local knowledge and narratives in Dyestad, Sweden, and Last Chance, Colorado.
- Elder's Hill, is an on-site project established in collaboration with Kultivator, and located in Öland, Sweden this on-site project is based on cultural exchange and intergenerational knowledge within rural contexts and consists of a root cellar and an open-air classroom that create spaces for social learning and knowledge collection.
- The Big Feed, is an eight-year social action and performance piece that serves as a yearly family reunion, potluck dinner, and symposium rolled into one. The work serves as a celebration of the regional landscape and experimental art, architecture, food, music, culture, and community.
- Switch, is a two-site installation work constructed with the Greater Des Moines Public Art Foundation at the Iowa State Fairgrounds and Capital Square in Des Moines, Iowa. An installation of archived materials related to horse culture was presented at the fair site and a video projection showing a horse's perspective was exhibited at the downtown Capital Square site.
- The Breaking Ring, is an installation at the Center for Contemporary Arts, Santa Fe, New Mexico including a 24-foot breaking ring made from regional aspen logs which held a diverse selection of public programming including qigong sessions, poetry readings, and performances.
- Center Pivot, is an experiential installation originally exhibited at Sala Diaz in San Antonio, Texas. The installation consisted of images and sound from M12's five-book, five-record collection of the same name.
- Lone Prairie, a circular 6-channel sound and video installation first presented at the Corcoran Gallery, School of Arts and Design in Washington, D.C.
- Victory Means So Much, a mixed media sculpture and sound installation of therapeutic light and sound for 32 regional fruit trees presented at the 21st International Art Biennial of Santa Cruz de la Sierra, Bolivia.
- Black Forest Institute, an outdoor public artwork that exists as an experimental art of forestry school for the sharing of knowledge and skills with regard to climate change, and wildfires within rural parts of the American West. The work consists of a Micro campus with three primary elements including the woodshed, a workbench, and an outdoor fireplace which holds a series of conversations through Fireside Dialogues at the Sculpture Lawn at the Ent Center for the Arts at the University of Colorado, Colorado Springs.
- The Tap, an artwork and gallery installation envisioning the Ogallala Aquifer presented by Landmark Arts at Texas Tech in Lubbock, Texas.
- Fountain (Orphan), an exhibition and outdoor installation curated by Lucy Lippard featuring a restored cast iron agricultural water well pump at SITE Santa Fe, New Mexico.

== Works Published ==
- Landlines: San Luis Valley, Journey into the American West, eds. Richard Saxton and Margo Handwerker. Spectator Books, 2024. Print.
- Center Pivot Library. Five book, five record collection. eds. Richard Saxton, et al. Rotterdam, the Netherlands: Jap Sam Books, Last Chance Press. 2017. Print.
- Star Route 1. Mary Welcome, Daniel Bachman. Rotterdam, the Netherlands: Jap Sam Books, Last Chance Press. 2017. Print.
- Future Rural Archive. Eds, Margo Handwerker, Josh Garrett-Davis, Chris Sauter, Richard Saxton. Rotterdam, the Netherlands: Jap Sam Books, Last Chance Press. 2017. Print.
- This Road Leads to Nowhere: Pierre Punk. Eds. Josh Garrett-Davis. Rotterdam, the Netherlands: Jap Sam Books, Last Chance Press. 2015. Print.
- An Equine Anthology. Eds. Richard Saxton, et al. Rotterdam, the Netherlands: Jap Sam Books, Last Chance Press. 2015. Print.
- Cool Pastoral Splendor. Eds. Richard Saxton and Kirsten Stoltz. Rotterdam, the Netherlands: Jap Sam Books, 2015. Print.
- A Decade of Country Hits: Art on the Rural Frontier. Eds. Margo Handwerker and Richard Saxton. Rotterdam, The Nederlands: Jap Sam Books, 2014. Print.

== Other Participants ==
Kultivator, myvillages, Fernando Garcia-Dory, Adam Gordon, Mimi Zeiger, Matt Slaby, Taman Eggers, Wes Janz, Daniel Bachman, Kurt Wagner, Kristy Duran, Temple Grandin, Zach Boddicker, Ian Hunter, Marco Marcon, Anna Beirbrauer, Sarah Shultz, Jamie Horter, Andrew Valdez, Elliot Ross, Raven Chacon, Dylan Golden Aycock, Chip Thomas, Rio de la Vista, Ronald Rael, Jessica Kahkoska, Buster Graybill, Eric Simpson
