= Kendel Boone =

American photographer

- Education: University of North Carolina at Greensboro
- Occupation: Photographer
- Awards: Art Unites CBUS Photography and Film Award (2020)
- Website: kendelkaptures.com

Kendel Boone is an American photographer from Roanoke Rapids, North Carolina now based in Columbus, Ohio. She is known for her portraits and documentary photography. Boone has exhibited work across the United States, including at the Cincinnati Art Museum and the Schumacher Gallery at Capital University.

She received a degree in information systems and supply chain management from the University of North Carolina at Greensboro.

In 2020, Boone was a recipient of the Art Unites CBUS award from the Greater Columbus Arts Council for her work documenting the George Floyd protests in the city.
