= The Darlinettes =

The Darlinettes were a jazz band formed in 1942 by students at the Woman's College of the University of North Carolina, as part of a trend of shifting gender roles in music at the US homefront during World War II.

== History ==
In 1945, in addition to playing for various organizations, The Darlinettes performed at the University of North Carolina at Greensboro's Junior Prom. Members of The Darlinettes included Audra Clinard Foil, Jean Hester McMillan and Mary Montague Watts. Concurrently with its band, the school also had a The Rhythmettes vocal group.

There is a Darlinettes Artist in Residence Endowment Fund at the University of North Carolina at Greensboro in their honor.
