= Mary Peacock Douglas =

American librarian and author (1903–1970)

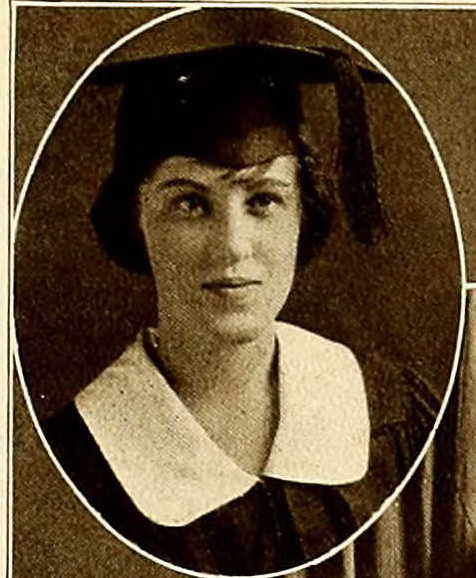
Mary Peacock Douglas

Mary Peacock Douglas (February 8, 1903 – January 29, 1970) was an American librarian and author. She was a nationally recognized expert in school libraries and made remarkable contributions for the development of the school library system in America.

== Biography ==
Born on February 8, 1903, in Salisbury, North Carolina, Mary Peacock Douglas was the daughter of Philip N. and Mary E. Trotter Peacock. In 1923, she earned the A.B. degree from the Woman's College of the University of North Carolina (now called the University of North Carolina at Greensboro). She also graduated with a B.S. in the L.S. degree from the School of Library Service, Columbia University, in 1931.

In 1923 she began her career as an English teacher and later became a school librarian in Salisbury. In July 1930, she became the first state school library adviser in the North Carolina Department of Public Instruction. During her tenure, she made notable contributions to school library development in the form of guidance, demonstration and publication of handbooks.

In June 1947 she became the first supervisor of libraries of City Schools in Raleigh, North Carolina and continued to serve in this position until her retirement on June 30, 1968.

She advocated the need for national guidelines to establish best practices in school libraries. She chaired a committee that formulated the 1945 ALA standards for school libraries titled School Libraries for Today and Tomorrow.

As a nationally recognized school library system expert, she held leadership positions in a number of professional organizations, including North Carolina Library Association, South-eastern Library Association, American Library Association’s School Libraries Section, and the national organization of State School Library Supervisors.

Her publications include North Carolina School Library Handbook and Teacher-Librarian's Handbook. The Teacher-Librarian's Handbook, one of the best selling books, was translated into Korean, Japanese, Spanish and Turkish.

In recognition of her outstanding contributions in inspiring children and youth, she was honored with the Grolier Society Award in 1958.

On August 25, 1931, she married Clarence DeWitt Douglas, who served as comptroller of the North Carolina State Board of Education.

She died of cancer on January 29, 1970.
