= David Epley (entertainer) =

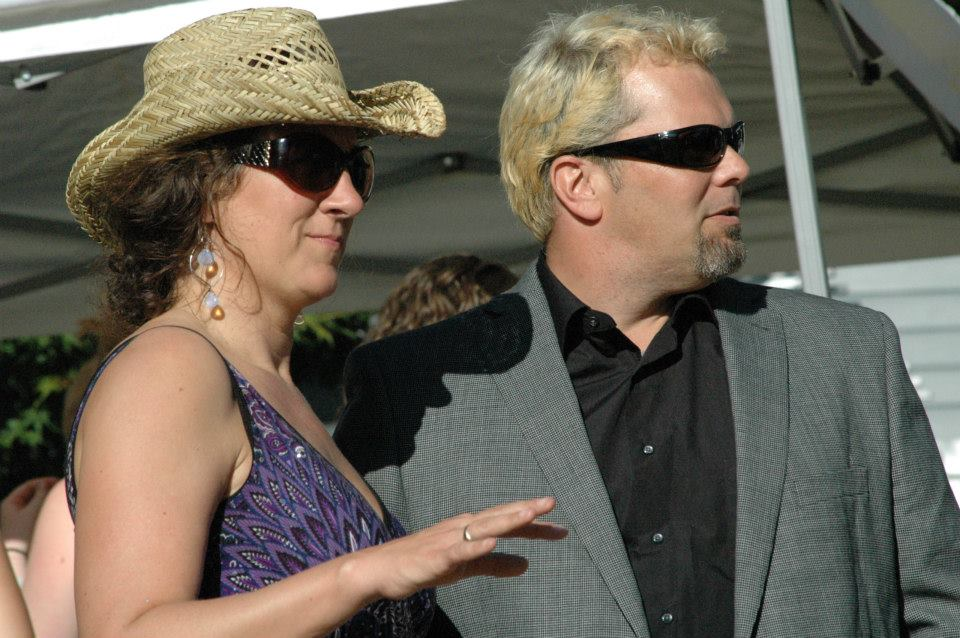
- Born: Germany
- Other names: Doktor Kaboom
- Education: University of North Carolina at Greensboro (BFA)
- Years active: 2006–present
- Known for: science communication, acting, writing, comedy

David Epley, popularly known as Doktor Kaboom, is a German/American science communicator, stage actor, and comedian. His interactive stage shows have been featured in venues like The Kennedy Center and The Orpheum Theater, and Epley has appeared on television programs like “Fox News”, "New Day Northwest," and a number of local television affiliates. His home experiment ideas have also been featured in magazines like Parents. Epley is a U.S. Army veteran and was a volunteer firefighter and emergency medical technician for 5 years.

== Early career and education ==
David Epley was born in Germany and grew up in North Carolina where he attended a specialized high school, the North Carolina School of Science and Mathematics, to take advanced science courses like Astrophysics. In college, Epley majored in both Chemistry and Theater. He earned a Bachelor of Fine Arts from the University of North Carolina at Greensboro. His affinity for the stage lead him to an early career in street performances and festivals in the U.S. and internationally, in particular Renaissance fairs.

== Career ==
Prior to his mainstream "Doktor Kaboom!" stage show, Epley wrote, directed, and performed in comedy routines across the United States and Canada. In 2006, Epley developed the "Doktor Kaboom" character as a means of combining science with art. He further refined the persona through street theatre in New York and outdoor festivals before moving on to a larger international audience.

Directed by Martin Albert, "Doktor Kaboom's Try This At Home! Vol. 1" starred Epley as the titular character and was released in 2010.

In 2014 the John F. Kennedy Center for the Performing Arts commissioned Epley to create "LIVE WIRE! The Electricity Tour," which was performed at the center before traveling to stages around the U.S. and internationally.

Part of Epley's message as a science communicator, which he reiterates on stage and televised appearances, is that "science is for everybody".

Epley is a board member for Arts Northwest, a performing arts presenter and management organization in the Pacific Northwest. He lives in Seattle with his wife and two daughters.
