= Len Preslar =

American business educator

- Born: August 13, 1947 (age 79); Concord, North Carolina, U.S.

Academic background
- Education: Wake Forest University (BS); University of North Carolina at Greensboro (MBA)

Academic work
- Discipline: Business
- Sub-discipline: Healthcare management
- Institutions: Wake Forest University

Len B. Preslar Jr. (born August 13, 1947) is an American business educator who has been a Distinguished Professor of Practice at Wake Forest University since 2009.

== Early life and education ==
Preslar was born and raised in Concord, North Carolina. He earned a bachelor's degree from Wake Forest University and an MBA from the University of North Carolina at Greensboro.

== Career ==
Prior to his career in academics, he worked as the CEO and president of the North Carolina Baptist Hospital of 18 years before retiring in 2007.
