= Mary Michel Boulus =

American nun, mathematician, and college president

Sister Mary Michel Boulus (born Jumela Ann Boulus, July 27, 1926 – December 9, 2012) was an American Catholic nun, mathematics teacher, and academic administrator who became president of Sacred Heart College in North Carolina.

== Life and career ==
Boulus was born on July 27, 1926, in China Grove, North Carolina, the daughter of Lebanese Catholic immigrants. After graduating from Concord High School, a public high school in North Carolina, she became a student at the Woman’s College of the University of North Carolina, now the University of North Carolina at Greensboro. Her activities there included participation in the Catholic Students organization, the Square Circle mathematics society, and the campus Service League, and service as president of the Interfaith Council.

After graduating in 1947, she returned to Concord High School as a mathematics teacher, while also studying guidance and law at Columbia University and the University of North Carolina at Chapel Hill. She joined the Sisters of Mercy as a postulant in 1949, and over the next years became a teacher at two local Catholic high schools. In 1959 she completed a master's degree in mathematics at John Carroll University, a Catholic university in Ohio, and by 1966 she was working as an instructor at Sacred Heart College. She was named treasurer of the college in 1967, and president in 1975.

The Lebanese Civil War roughly coincided in time with her term as president, and she worked to provide US scholarships for Lebanese students displaced by the war. Although she was active in starting new programs at Sacred Heart College, the school closed for lack of students and funding in 1987, and its facilities are now used by Belmont Abbey College.

In later life, Boulus continued to work as director of food services at her convent. She died on December 9, 2012.

== Recognition ==
Boulus was given honorary doctorates by the University of North Carolina at Greensboro in 1977, recognizing her as their first graduate lead a four-year college or university, and by Belmont Abbey College recognizing her efforts at starting new programs at Sacred Heart College, some of which continued at Belmont Abbey. UNC Greensboro also gave her their Alumni Distinguished Service Award, in the same year.

In 2011, Lebanese president Michel Suleiman gave her the Presidential Shield of the Republic of Lebanon.
