= Vincent Rue =

American psychotherapist and pro-life advocate

Vincent Montgomery Rue
- Education: University of North Carolina at Greensboro
- Known for: Advocating for a link between abortion and mental health problems
- Spouse: Susan Stanford-Rue
- Scientific career
- Fields: Psychology, psychotherapy
- Thesis: An examination of selected attitudes and opinions of federal-level bureaucrats on the development of national family policy and programming (1975)

Vincent Montgomery Rue is an American psychotherapist and advocate for the view that abortion can negatively impact women's mental health, as well as the founder and co-director (along with his wife, Susan Stanford-Rue, who is also a psychotherapist) of the now-inactive Institute for Pregnancy Loss. He says he has treated many women who have had painful abortion experiences, and who have wished that they had received more information before having their abortions.

== Abortion and mental health ==
He is known for being one of the first to propose a link between abortion and mental health problems, which he dubbed post-abortion syndrome when testifying before Congress in the early 1980s. Post-abortion syndrome is not recognized by as a condition by the American Psychological Association or the American Psychiatric Association. In 1987, Rue presented a paper titled "The Psychological Aftermath of Abortion: A White Paper"—to the then-surgeon general, C. Everett Koop, who rejected it. The Guttmacher Institute says that a study published by Rue et al. in the Journal of Psychiatric Research in 2009 included all mental health problems with which women were diagnosed over their entire lifetimes, thus negating the argument that these disorders were caused by having abortions.

== Criticism ==
In 1992, Rue's testimony in the Planned Parenthood v. Casey case was thrown out by a district judge, who concluded that it was not credible. In 2014, judge Myron Herbert Thompson criticized the state of Alabama for hiring Rue to defend anti-abortion legislation.
