= Scalawag (magazine) =

American magazine

- Executive Director: Cierra Hinton
- Former editors: Evan Walker-Wells
- Categories: Politics, society, culture, economics, American south
- Frequency: Quarterly
- Founder: Evan Walker-Wells; Sarah Bufkin
- Founded: 2015
- Country: United States
- Based in: Durham, North Carolina
- Language: English
- Website: scalawagmagazine.org

Scalawag is an American nonprofit digital magazine focused on Southern politics and culture. The magazine was founded in 2015.

== History ==
Founded in 2015 in Durham, Scalawag was launched through a Kickstarter that raised over $31,000. The magazine is a left-wing, progressive outlet targeting southern audiences and documenting a range of issues with "movement journalism". Although it started primarily with volunteer labor and approximately 250 freelance writers and photographer, in 2018 the organization shifted to a membership model and offered events in order to become sustainable. In 2020, the magazine announced it had made the financial decision to end its print operations.

The co-founders include Evan Walker-Wells and Sarah Bufkin. Cierra Hinton is the executive director as of fall 2018. Sherronda J. Brown is the magazine's editor-in-chief as of March 2023. In 2022 the organization went on hiatus for 30 days of paid leave for the entire staff.

Scalawag's work has been cited in journals, books, and news outlets including Longreads, PEN America, Yes!, AJ+, and The New York Times.
