= Stephanie Rogers =

American poet from Ohio

Stephanie Rogers is an American poet from Ohio who now lives in New York City. Her work has appeared in The Southern Review, Pleiades, Cream City Review, Madison Review, and The Pinch. She co-founded the feminist film review website Bitch Flicks.

== Life ==
Originally from Ohio, she graduated from the University of North Carolina, Greensboro's Master of Fine Arts program in 2007. She has also studied at Ohio State University and the University of Cincinnati. In 2008, she and Amber Leab co-founded the feminist film review website Bitch Flicks.

Her work appears in The Southern Review, Pleiades, Cream City Review, Madison Review, and The Pinch.

She lives in New York City.

== Works ==
- "Dear Sophia"; "Beating the Shit out of my Despair", Symphony for Red, "The Incident When my Dog Dies and/or You Leave Me"'

=== Anthologies ===
- Kim Addonizio; Jeb Livingood, eds. (2009). Best New Poets 2009: 50 Poems from Emerging Writers. University of Virginia Press. ISBN 978-0-9766296-4-1.
- Eric Pankey; Jeb Livingood, eds. (2006). Best New Poets 2006: 50 Poems from Emerging Writers. University of Virginia Press. ISBN 978-0-9766296-1-0.
