= Kerri French =

American poet

Kerri French is an American poet.

== Life ==
Originally from North Carolina, she received a Bachelor of Arts degree from the University of North Carolina at Chapel Hill. She graduated from the University of North Carolina, Greensboro's Master of Fine Arts program in 2006. She has taught at Boston University and Mount Ida College. Her latest project, for DIAGRAM magazine, is a series of poems focused on British singer Amy Winehouse.

Her work appears in Agenda, Brooklyn Review, Fugue, Lumina, The Blotter, DIAGRAM, Natural Bridge, and foursquare editions. She has broadcast her poems on Sirius Satellite Radio.

She currently resides in Tennessee.

== Awards ==
2009 Larry Franklin and Mei Kwong Fellowship (Writers' Room of Boston)

== Works ==
- "ONE MONTH AFTER CAMDEN TOWN FIRE, AMY WINEHOUSE DIAGNOSED WITH SKIN CONDITION"; "DOCTORS WARN AMY WINEHOUSE OF FUTURE EMPHYSEMA RISK", Diagram 8.6

=== Anthologies ===
- Mark Strand; Jeb Livingood, eds. (2008). Best New Poets, 2008: 50 Poems from Emerging Writers. University of Virginia Press. ISBN 978-0-9766296-3-4.
- Anthology, July 19, 2006
