= List of Guggenheim Fellowships awarded in 1996 =

List of Guggenheim Fellowships awarded in 1996

Fellow	Category	Field of Study
Henry J. Aaron	Social Sciences	Economics
Lila Abu-Lughod	Social Sciences	Anthropology & Cultural Studies
Sadhan Kumar Adhikari	Natural Sciences	Physics
Agha Shahid Ali	Creative Arts	Poetry
Carlos Aguirre	Creative Arts	Fine Arts
Peggy Ahwesh	Creative Arts	Film
César Tomás Aira	Creative Arts	Fiction
Wye Jamison Allanbrook	Humanities	Music Research
George Reid Andrews	Humanities	Iberian & Latin American History
Nina M. Athanassoglou-Kallmyer	Humanities	Fine Arts Research
Carmen Bambach	Humanities	Fine Arts Research
Larry M. Bartels	Social Sciences	Political Science
John Beardsley		Architecture, Planning, & Design
Etelvino J. H. Bechara		Molecular & Cellular Biology
Neal Bell		Drama & Performance Art
Anna Maria Busse Berger		Music Research
Paul F. Berliner		Folklore & Popular Culture
Stephanie Black	Creative Arts	Film
Anthony M. Bloch		Applied Mathematics
George Boolos		Philosophy
José Alberto Braunstein		Anthropology & Cultural Studies
Lucie Brock-Broido		Poetry
Philip H. Bucksbaum		Physics
Graham B. Campbell		Fine Arts
Jane Caplan		Intellectual & Cultural History
Néstor Carrillo		Plant Sciences
George Chauncey		U.S. History
Chen Yi	Creative Arts	Music Composition
Jamsheed Chosky		Near Eastern Studies
Steven Chu		Physics
Susanna Coffey		Fine Arts
Mark R. Cohen		Near Eastern Studies
Alan Colquhoun		Architecture, Planning, & Design
Valdir Cruz	Creative Arts	Photography
Michael Daugherty		Music Composition
John A. Davis		Italian History
Philip J. DeVries	Natural Sciences	Organismic Biology & Ecology
Andrés Di Tella	Creative Arts	Film
Ronald I. Dorn		Geography & Environmental Studies
Prasenjit Duara		East Asian Studies
Carroll Dunham		Fine Arts
Morris Eaves		Literary Criticism
Jennifer Egan		Fiction
Robin L. Einhorn		U.S. History
Nicole Eisenman		Fine Arts
Uri Eisenzweig		French Literature
Terry Evans	Creative Arts	Photography
Kevin Jerome Everson	Creative Arts	Photography
Constantin Fasolt	Humanities	German & East European History
Rochelle Feinstein	Creative Arts	Fine Arts
David Ferry	Creative Arts	Poetry
Philip Fisher	Humanities	Literary Criticism
Jonathan Franzen	Creative Arts	Fiction
Rosana Patricia Fuertes	Creative Arts	Fine Arts
Pablo E. Furman	Creative Arts	Music Composition
Jorge Gamboa		Physics
David Ganz		Medieval Literature
Juan Gelman		Poetry
Susan A. Gelman		Psychology
Chambliss Giobbi		Music Composition
Mike Glier		Fine Arts
David P. Goldenberg		Molecular & Cellular Biology
David Guterson		Fiction
Jacquelyn Dowd Hall		U.S. History
William F. Hanks		Anthropology & Cultural Studies
Lars Peter Hansen		Economics
Russell Hardin		Political Science
Ruth Harris		French History
Thomas Harris	Creative Arts	Photography
Tim Harris		British History
Dayton Haskin		English Literature
Hayden Herrera	Creative Arts	Biography
Mack P. Holt		Renaissance History
Jonathon Howard		Molecular & Cellular Biology
Susan Howe		Poetry
Nora Jacobson	Creative Arts	Film
Jainendra K. Jain		Physics
Roberta Johnson		Spanish & Portuguese Literature
Mark D. Jordan	Humanities	Medieval Literature
Paul Kaiser		Video & Audio
Catherine Kallin		Physics
Richard B. Kaner		Chemistry
Temma Kaplan		Intellectual & Cultural History
P. Andrew Karplus		Molecular & Cellular Biology
Aviva Kempner	Creative Arts	Film
Jon Kessler		Fine Arts
Kyung-Suk Kim		Engineering
John T. Koch		Medieval Literature
Harold Hongju Koh		Law
Howard Korder		Drama & Performance Art
Kathryn Kramer		Fiction
Corinne A. Kratz		Anthropology & Cultural Studies
Allan Kulikoff	Humanities	U.S. History
Michèle Lamont		Sociology
Russell Lande		Organismic Biology & Ecology
Ullrich Langer		Italian Literature
Peter Lepage		Physics
Suzanne Jill Levine		Latin American Literature
Bruce G. Lindsay		Statistics
Ralph Lombreglia		Fiction
Setha M. Low		Architecture, Planning, & Design
Cristina Magaldi		Music Research
Sabina Magliocco		Folklore & Popular Culture
Frank Majore	Creative Arts	Photography
Florencia E. Mallon	Humanities	Iberian & Latin American History
Carl Martin	Creative Arts	Photography
Jann Matlock		Fine Arts Research
Jane Dammen McAuliffe		Religion
Todd McGrain		Fine Arts
J. R. McNeill		Science Writing
Jorge H. Medina		Neuroscience
H. Jay Melosh		Earth Science
Kenneth M. Merz		Chemistry
Sam Messer		Fine Arts
Ann Messner		Fine Arts
Axel Meyer		Organismic Biology & Ecology
Eugenia Meyer		Iberian & Latin American History
Paulo K. Monteiro		Economics
Jennifer Montgomery	Creative Arts	Film
Rodrigo Montoya Rojas		Anthropology & Cultural Studies
Louis A. Montrose		English Literature
Shaul Mukamel		Chemistry
Desiderio Navarro	Humanities	Latin American Literature
Larry Neal	Humanities	Economic History
Robert Nozick	Humanities	Philosophy
Josiah Ober	Humanities	Classics
Chris Offutt	Creative Arts	Fiction
Celeste Olalquiaga	Humanities	Fine Arts Research
Patrick Olivelle	Humanities	Religion
Eduardo L. Ortiz	Humanities	History of Science & Technology
Karen Hunger Parshall		History of Science & Technology
Joyce Pensato		Fine Arts
Irene M. Pepperberg	Natural Sciences	Organismic Biology & Ecology
Gregory A. Petsko		Molecular & Cellular Biology
Janet Pierrehumbert		Linguistics
Raymond T. Pierrehumbert		Applied Mathematics
Kenneth Pomeranz		Economic History
Gyan Prakash		South Asian Studies
Ed Radtke	Creative Arts	Film
Natasha V. Raikhel		Plant Sciences
Lawrence S. Rainey		American Literature
Gabriel Retes Balzaretti	Creative Arts	Film
Nelly Richard		Latin American Literature
Eduardo Luis Rodríguez		Architecture, Planning, & Design
Roque Roldán Ortega		General Nonfiction
Marina Roseman		Anthropology & Cultural Studies
Jonathan Rosenbaum		Film, Video, & Radio Studies
Morris Rosenzweig		Music Composition
Mark Rudman		Poetry
C. Bryan Rulon		Music Composition
Kathe Sandler	Creative Arts	Film
Eric L. Santner		Intellectual & Cultural History
Stacy Schiff	Creative Arts	Biography
Richard M. Schoen		Mathematics
Lynn Shapiro	Creative Arts	Choreography
Barbara Sicherman		U.S. History
María Teresa Sirvent		Education
Valeska Soares		Fine Arts
Ignacio Solares Bernal		Fiction
Theodore Steinberg		U.S. History
Jessica Stockholder		Fine Arts
Linda Stojak		Fine Arts
Barbara G. Taylor	Humanities	British History
Chris Theofanidis	Creative Arts	Music Composition
George Tsontakis	Creative Arts	Music Composition
Antonio Wallace Turok	Creative Arts	Photography
Mark Tushnet	Social Sciences	Law
Julio A. Urbina	Natural Sciences	Molecular & Cellular Biology
David L. Vander Meulen	Humanities	Bibliography
Doug Varone	Creative Arts	Choreography
Stephen A. Vavasis	Natural Sciences	Computer Science
J. David Velleman	Humanities	Philosophy
Dan Voiculescu	Natural Sciences	Mathematics
Athena Vrettos	Humanities	English Literature
Kay B. Warren	Social Sciences	Anthropology & Cultural Studies
Janis C. Weeks	Natural Sciences	Neuroscience
Stephen D. White	Humanities	Medieval History
Stanley Whitney	Creative Arts	Fine Arts
R. Mark Wightman	Natural Sciences	Chemistry
Clifford M. Will	Natural Sciences	Astronomy—Astrophysics
Fredric Woodbridge Wilson	Humanities	Theatre Arts
George R. Wodicka	Natural Sciences	Medicine & Health
Robert Wrigley	Creative Arts	Poetry
Maxine Yalovitz-Blankenship	Creative Arts	Fine Arts
Bell Yung	Humanities	Folklore & Popular Culture
Viviana A. Zelizer	Social Sciences	Sociology
Rosemary Lévy Zumwalt	Social Sciences	Anthropology & Cultural Studies
Barton Zwiebach	Natural Sciences	Physics

== See also ==
- Guggenheim Fellowship
