= Anne Fontaine (disambiguation) =

Anne Fontaine is a filmmaker and actress.

Anne Fontaine may also refer to:

- Anne Fontaine (designer), fashion designer
- Anne Fontaine (brand), fashion brand
- Anne Fontaine Foundation, nonprofit organisation
