= Agha Shahid Ali =

Indian-American poet (1949–2001)

- Born: Agha Shahid Ali; 4 February 1949; New Delhi, India
- Died: 8 December 2001 (aged 52)
- Resting place: Bridge Street Cemetery; Northampton, Massachusetts, U.S.
- Education: University of Kashmir (BA); University of Delhi (MA); University of Arizona (MFA); Pennsylvania State University (PhD)
- Occupations: Poet, Professor
- Notable credit(s): The Country Without a Post Office, Rooms Are Never Finished and The Rebel's Silhouette
- Relatives: Agha Ashraf Ali (Father); Prof. Agha Iqbal Ali (brother); Prof. Hena Ahmad, Prof. Sameetah Agha (Sisters) Agha Shaukat Ali (Uncle) Begum Zaffar Ali (Grandmother)
- Awards: Pushcart Prize, National Book Award 2001, Guggenheim Fellowship for Creative Arts, US & Canada (1996)

Signature
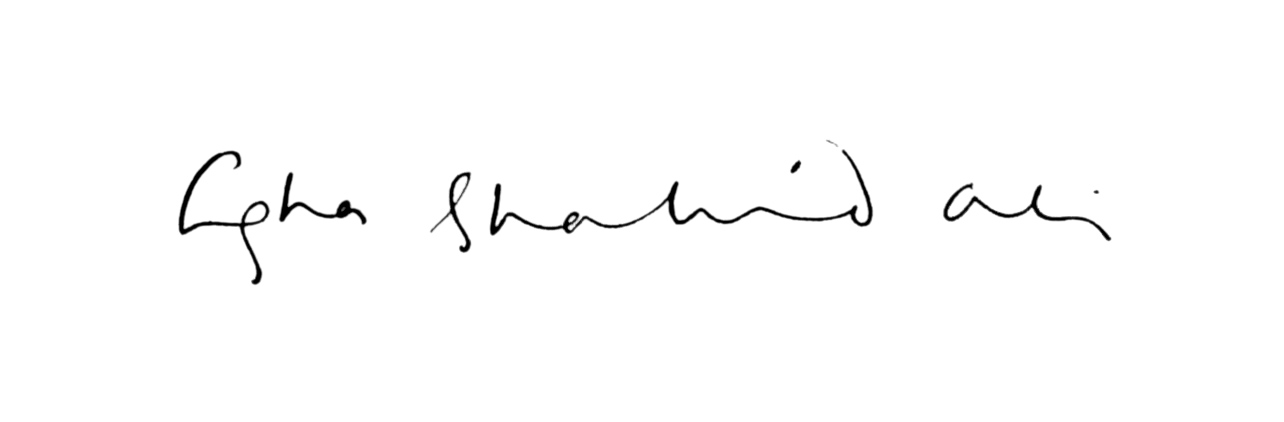

Agha Shahid Ali Qizilbash (4 February 1949 – 8 December 2001) was an Indian-American poet. Born in New Delhi into a Shia Muslim family from Kashmir, Ali lived between India and the United States before permanently moving to the United States in his mid-twenties, where he became affiliated with the literary movement known as New Formalism in American poetry. His collections include A Walk Through the Yellow Pages, The Half-Inch Himalayas, A Nostalgist's Map of America, The Country Without a Post Office, and Rooms Are Never Finished, the latter a finalist for the National Book Award in 2001.

The University of Utah Press awards the Agha Shahid Ali Poetry Prize annually in memory of this "celebrated poet and beloved teacher."

== Early life and education ==
Agha Shahid Ali was born on 4 February 1949, in New Delhi in the Union of India, into the illustrious Agha family of Kashmiri Muslims from Srinagar, tracing their Qizilbash ancestral roots back to Kandahar in Afghanistan. He grew up in the erstwhile Indian state of Jammu and Kashmir, where his family was from, and in the U.S. state of Indiana, where his parents studied. Shahid's father Agha Ashraf Ali was a renowned educationist. His grandmother Begum Zaffar Ali was the first woman matriculate of India's Kashmir.

Shahid was educated at the Burn Hall School, after which he attended University of Kashmir, followed by Hindu College, University of Delhi. He permanently moved to the United States in 1976. He earned a PhD in English from Pennsylvania State University in 1984, and an M.F.A. from the University of Arizona in 1985. He held teaching positions at nine universities and colleges in India and the United States.

Shahid was born a Shia Muslim, but his upbringing was secular. Shahid and his brother Iqbal both studied at an Irish Catholic parochial school and, in an interview, he recalled that: "There was never a hint of any kind of parochialism in the home."

== Literary work ==
Ali expressed his love and concern for his people in In Memory of Begum Akhtar and The Country Without a Post Office, which was written with the Kashmir conflict as a backdrop. He was a translator of Urdu poet Faiz Ahmed Faiz (The Rebel's Silhouette; Selected Poems), and editor for the Middle East and Central Asia segment of Jeffery Paine's Poetry of Our World. He also compiled the volume Ravishing DisUnities: Real Ghazals in English. His last book was Call Me Ishmael Tonight, a collection of English ghazals, and his poems are featured in American Alphabets: 25 Contemporary Poets (2006) and other anthologies.

Ali taught at the MFA Program for Poets & Writers at University of Massachusetts Amherst, at the MFA Writing Seminars at Bennington College as well as at creative writing programs at SUNY-Binghamton, University of Utah, Baruch College, Warren Wilson College, Hamilton College and New York University.

J&K authorities have removed three poems – "Postcard from Kashmir", "In Arabic" and "The Last Saffron" from the curriculum of University of Kashmir and two poems, "I see Kashmir from New Delhi at Midnight" and "Call me Ishmael Tonight" from the Cluster University. Education advisors in Delhi/Srinagar have maintained that such "Resistance Literature" sustains "secessionist mindset, aspiration & narrative" among students.

== Personal life and death ==
Ali was gay and never married. He died of brain cancer in December 2001 and was buried in Northampton, Massachusetts, in the vicinity of Amherst, a town sacred to his beloved poet Emily Dickinson.

== Bibliography ==
This list represents the published output of Ali, arranged in chronological order and sorted by the manner in which he contributed to the work in question.

=== Poetry ===
- Bone Sculpture (1972),
- In Memory of Begum Akhtar and Other Poems (1979), ASIN B0DLT6ZQB9
- The Half-Inch Himalayas (1987), ISBN 9780819511324
- A Walk Through the Yellow Pages (1987), ISBN 9780933313071
- A Nostalgist's Map of America (1991), ISBN 9780393309249
- The Beloved Witness: Selected Poems (1992), ISBN 9780670845248
- The Country Without a Post Office (1997), ISBN 9780393317619
- Rooms Are Never Finished (2001), ISBN 9780393324167
- Call Me Ishmael Tonight: A Book of Ghazals (2003), ISBN 9780393326123
- The Veiled Suite: The Collected Poems, (2009) ISBN 9780393068047
- Final Collections. (2004) ISBN 9788178240916

=== Translations and edited volumes ===
- Translator, The Rebel's Silhouette: Selected Poems by Faiz Ahmed Faiz (1992),
- Editor, Ravishing Disunities: Real Ghazals in English (2000). ISBN 9780819564375

== Influences ==
Ali was deeply moved by the music of Begum Akhtar. The two had met through a friend of Akhtar's when Ali was a teenager and her music became a lasting presence in his life. Features of her ghazal rendition—such as wit, wordplay and nakhra (affectation)—were present in Ali's poetry as well. However, Amitav Ghosh suspects that the strongest connection between the two rose from the idea that "sorrow has no finer mask than a studied lightness of manner"—traces of which were seen in Ali's and Akhtar's demeanor in their respective lives.

== Awards ==
- Pushcart Prize
- Guggenheim Fellowship in 1996
- Bread Loaf Writers' Conference Fellowship
- Ingram-Merrill Foundation Fellowship
- New York Foundation for the Arts Fellowship
