= Qizilbash =

Alevi militant groups

Qizilbash or Kizilbash (Note: Azerbaijani: قیزیلباش (Latin script: qızılbaş) Azerbaijani pronunciation: [ɡɯzɯɫˈbɑʃ]; Ottoman Turkish: قزيل باش; Persian: قزلباش, romanized: qizilbāš (modern Iranian reading: qezelbāš); Turkish: kızılbaş, lit. 'red head' Turkish pronunciation: [kɯzɯɫbaʃ]) were a diverse array of mainly Turkoman (Note: "The Qizilbash, composed mainly of Turkman tribesmen, were the military force introduced by the conquering Safavis to the Iranian domains in the sixteenth century." Quoted from Babayan (1993), pp. 1–6.) Shia militant groups that flourished in Iranian Azerbaijan, Anatolia, the Armenian highlands, and the Caucasus from the late 15th century onwards, and contributed to the foundation of the Safavid dynasty in early modern Iran. (Note: "Kizilbāsh (T. "Red-head"). [...] In general, it is used loosely to denote a wide variety of extremist Shi'i sects [see Ghulāt], which flourished in Anatolia and Kurdistān from the late 7th/13th century onwards, including such groups as the Alevis." Quoted from Savory (1986), p. 243.)

By the 18th-century, anyone involved with the Safavid state—militarily, diplomatically, or administratively—came to be broadly referred to as "Qizilbash". It was eventually applied to some inhabitants of Iran. In the early 19th-century, Shia Muslims from Iran could be referred as "Qizilbash", thus highlighting the influence of the distinctive traits of the Safavids, despite the Iranian shah (king) Fath-Ali Shah Qajar (r. 1797–1834) simultaneously creating a Qajar dynastic identity grounded in the pre-Islamic past.

== Etymology ==
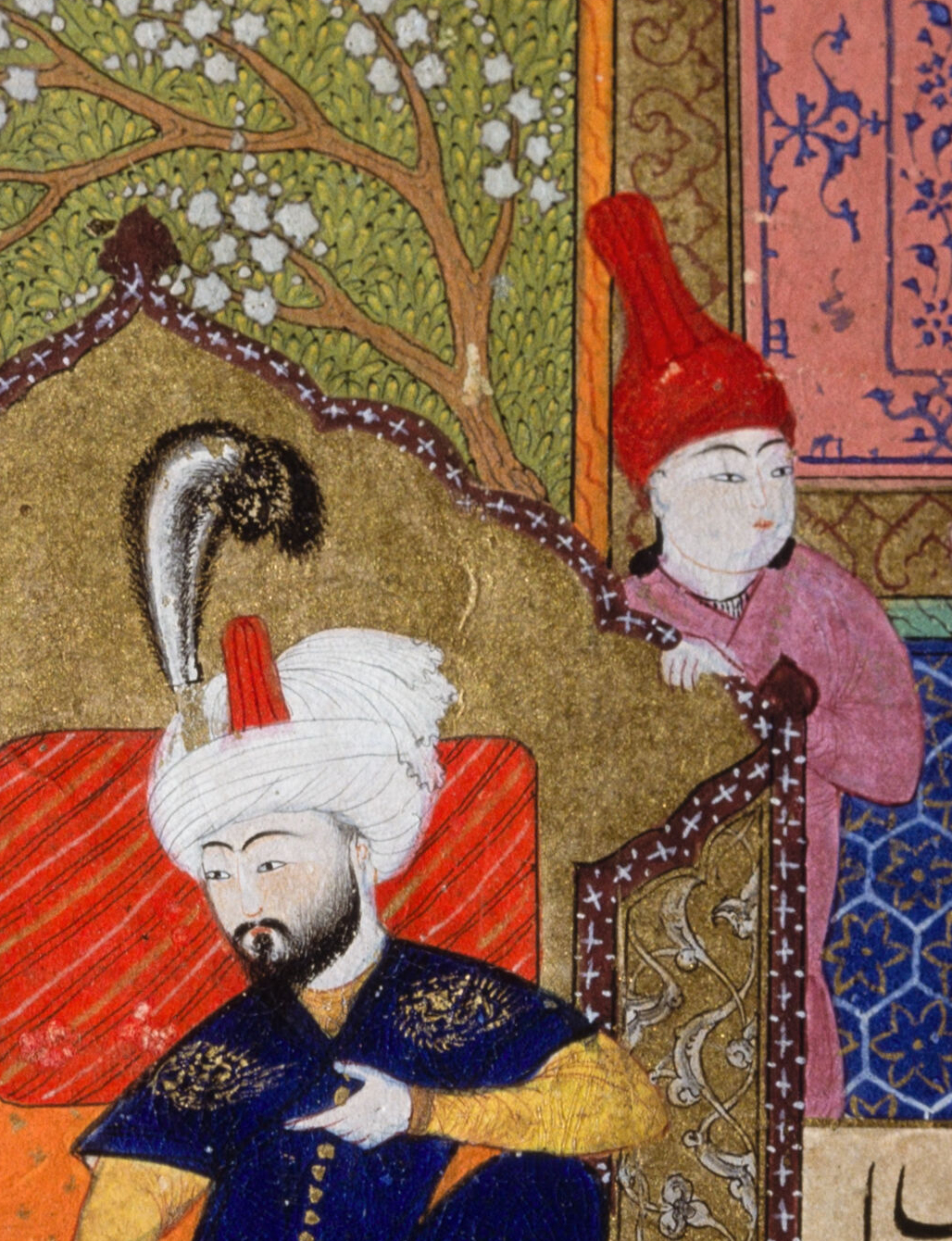
Taj-e Haydari, with and without turban. Dastan-i Jamal u Jalal, 1502–1505, Tabriz (Uppsala University Library, O Nova 2)

The word Qizilbash derives from Turkish Qızılbaş, meaning "red head". The expression is derived from their distinctive twelve-gored crimson headwear (tāj or tark in Persian; sometimes specifically titled "Haydar's Crown" تاج حیدر / Tāj-e Ḥaydar), (Note: Tāj, meaning crown in Persian, is also a term for hats used to delineate one's affiliation to a particular Sufi order.) indicating their adherence to the Twelve Imams and to Shaykh Haydar, the spiritual leader (sheikh) of the Safavid order in accordance with the Imamate in Twelver doctrine. The name was originally a pejorative label given to them by their Sunni Ottoman foes, but soon it was adopted as a mark of pride.

== Origins ==
The origin of the Qizilbash can be dated from the 15th century onward, when the spiritual grandmaster of the movement, Shaykh Haydar (the head of the Safaviyya Sufi order), organized his followers into militant troops. The Qizilbash were originally composed of seven Turkish-speaking Turkic tribes: Rumlu, Shamlu, Ustajlu, Afshar, Qajar, Tekelu, and Zulkadar (Dulkadirs/Dhu’l-Qadar). (Note: "Кызылбаши, первоначально состоявшие из представителей семи малоазиатских тюркоязычных племен румлу, шамлу, устаджлу, афшар, каджар, текелю и зулкадар, говоривших на азербайджанском языке, были с XV в. одной из главных военно-политических опор Сефевидского государства. Quoted from Grigoriev (2000), pp. 32–46.) (Note: "The primary court language remained Turkish. But it was not the Turkish of Istambul. It was a Turkish dialect, the dialect of the Qizilbash Turkomans, which is still spoken today in the province of Azerbaijan, in north-western Iran." Quoted from Blow (2009), P. 165.)

The Qizilbash were a Shia community that emerged under the leadership of the Safavids in the early 15th century.

Connections between the Qizilbash and other religious groups and secret societies, such as the Mazdaki movement in the Sasanian Empire, or its more radical offspring, the Khurramites, and Turkic shamanism, have been suggested. Of these, the Khurramites were, like the Qizilbash, an early ghulat group and dressed in red, for which they were termed "the red ones" (Persian: سرخ‌ جامگان, romanized: sarkh jāmegān, Arabic: محمرة, romanized: muḥammirah) by medieval sources. In this context, Turkish scholar Abdülbaki Gölpınarlı sees the Qizilbash as "spiritual descendants of the Khurramites".

== Organization ==
The Qizilbash were a coalition of many different tribes of predominantly (but not exclusively) Turkic-speaking background united in their adherence to the Safavid order.

As murids (sworn students) of the Safavi pirs (spiritual guides), the Qizilbash owed implicit obedience to their leader in his capacity as their murshid-e kāmil "supreme spiritual director" and, after the establishment of the kingdom, as their padishah (great king). The kingdom's establishment thus changed the purely religious pir–murid relationship into a political one. As a consequence, any act of disobedience of the Qizilbash Sufis against the order of the spiritual grandmaster (Persian: nāsufigari "conduct unbecoming of a Sufi") became "an act of treason against the king and a crime against the state", as was the case in 1614 when Abbas the Great put some followers to death.

== Beliefs ==
The Qizilbash adhered to heterodox Shi’i doctrines encouraged by the early Safavi sheikhs Haydar and his son Ismail I. They regarded their rulers as divine figures, and so were classified as ghulat "extremists" by orthodox Twelvers.

When Tabriz was taken, there was not a single book on Twelverism among the Qizilbash leaders. The book of the well known Iraqi scholar al-Hilli (1250–1325) was procured in the town library to provide religious guidance to the state. The Qizilbash battle cry was "qurban oldiğim, sadaqa oldiğim, pirüm mürşidim" (قربان اولدیغم، صدقه اولدیغم، پیروم مرشدم), meaning "may I be sacrificed for you, my spiritual guide" in Turkish, and referring to Shah Ismail.

The imported Shi'i ulama did not participate in the formation of Safavid religious policies during the early formation of the state. However, ghulat doctrines were later forsaken and Arab Twelver ulama from Lebanon, Iraq, and Bahrain were imported in increasing numbers to bolster orthodox Twelver practice and belief.

=== Qizilbash aqidah in Anatolia ===
- Among the individual revered by Alevis, two figures, firstly Abu Muslim who assisted the Abbasid Caliphate to beat Umayyad Caliphate, but who was later eliminated and murdered by Caliph al-Mansur, and secondly Babak Khorramdin, who incited a rebellion against the Abbasid Caliphate and consequently was killed by Caliph al-Mu'tasim, are highly respected. In addition, the Safavid leader Ismail I is highly regarded.
- The Qizilbash aqidah, or creed, is based upon a syncretic fiqh (jurisprudence tradition) called batiniyya, referring to an inner or hidden meaning in holy texts. It incorporates some Qarmatian thoughts, originally introduced by Abu’l-Khāttāb Muhammad ibn Abu Zaynab al-Asadī, and later developed by Maymun al-Qāddāh and his son ʿAbd Allāh ibn Maymun, and Muʿtazila with a strong belief in The Twelve Imams.
- Not all of the members believe that the fasting in Ramadan is obligatory although some Alevi Turks perform their fasting duties partially in Ramadan.
- Some beliefs of shamanism still are common among the Qizilbash in villages.

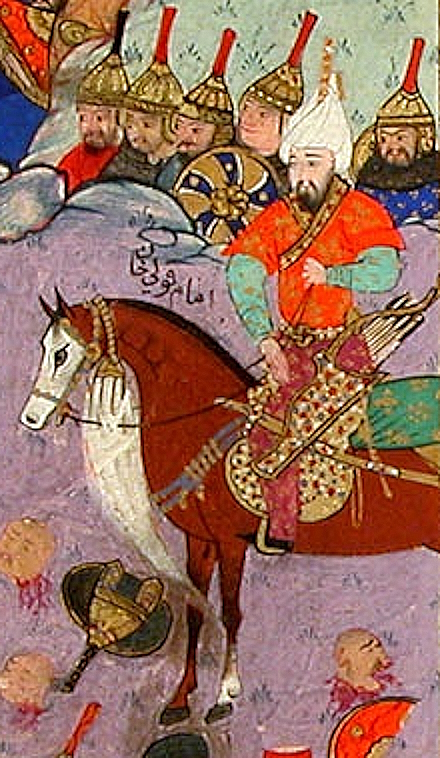
The Qizilbash Imam Quli Khan with his troops in the Ottoman–Safavid War (1578–1590). Şecāʿatnāme (1586).

- The Qizilbash are not a part of Ja'fari jurisprudence, even though they can be considered as members of different tariqa of Shia Islam all looks like sub-classes of Twelver. Their conviction includes Batiniyya-Hurufism and "Sevener-Qarmatians-Isma'ilism" sentiments.
- They all may be considered as special groups not following the Ja'fari jurisprudence, like Alawites who are in the class of ghulat Twelver Shia Islam, but a special Batiniyya belief somewhat similar to Isma'ilism in their conviction.

== Composition ==
Among the Qizilbash, Turcoman tribes from Eastern Anatolia and Iranian Azerbaijan who had helped Ismail I defeat the Aq Qoyunlu tribe were by far the most important in both number and influence and the name Qizilbash is usually applied exclusively to them. Some of these greater Turcoman tribes were subdivided into as many as eight or nine clans, including:

- Ustādjlu (Its origins reach back to the Begdili)
- Rūmlu (Its name means the one who originates from the Roman land i.e. Anatolia.)
- Shāmlu (The most powerful clan during the reign of Shah Ismail I. Its name means the one who originates from Sham i.e. the Levant.)
- Dulkadir (Arabic: Dhu 'l-Kadar)
- Afshār
- Qājār
- Takkalu (Persian rendition of Täkälü or Tekelü which means the one who originates from the Teke Peninsula of Anatolia. The region was named after the Beylik of Teke which might have a connection with the Teke tribe of Turkmenistan.)

Other tribes — such as the Turkman, Bahārlu, Qaramānlu, Warsāk, and Bayāt — were occasionally listed among these "seven great uymaqs". Today, the remnants of the Qizilbash confederacy are found among the Afshar, the Qashqai, Turkmen, Shahsevan, and others.

Some of these names consist of a place-name with the addition of the Turkish suffix -lu, such as Shāmlu or Bahārlu. Other names are those of old Oghuz tribes such as the Afshār, Dulghadir, or Bayāt, as mentioned by the medieval Karakhanid historian Mahmud al-Kashgari.

The non-Turkic Iranian tribes among the Qizilbash were called Tājīks by the Turcomans and included:

- Tālish
- The Lurs
- Siāh-Kuh (Karādja-Dagh)
- certain Kurdish tribes
- certain Persian families and clans

== History ==
=== Beginnings ===
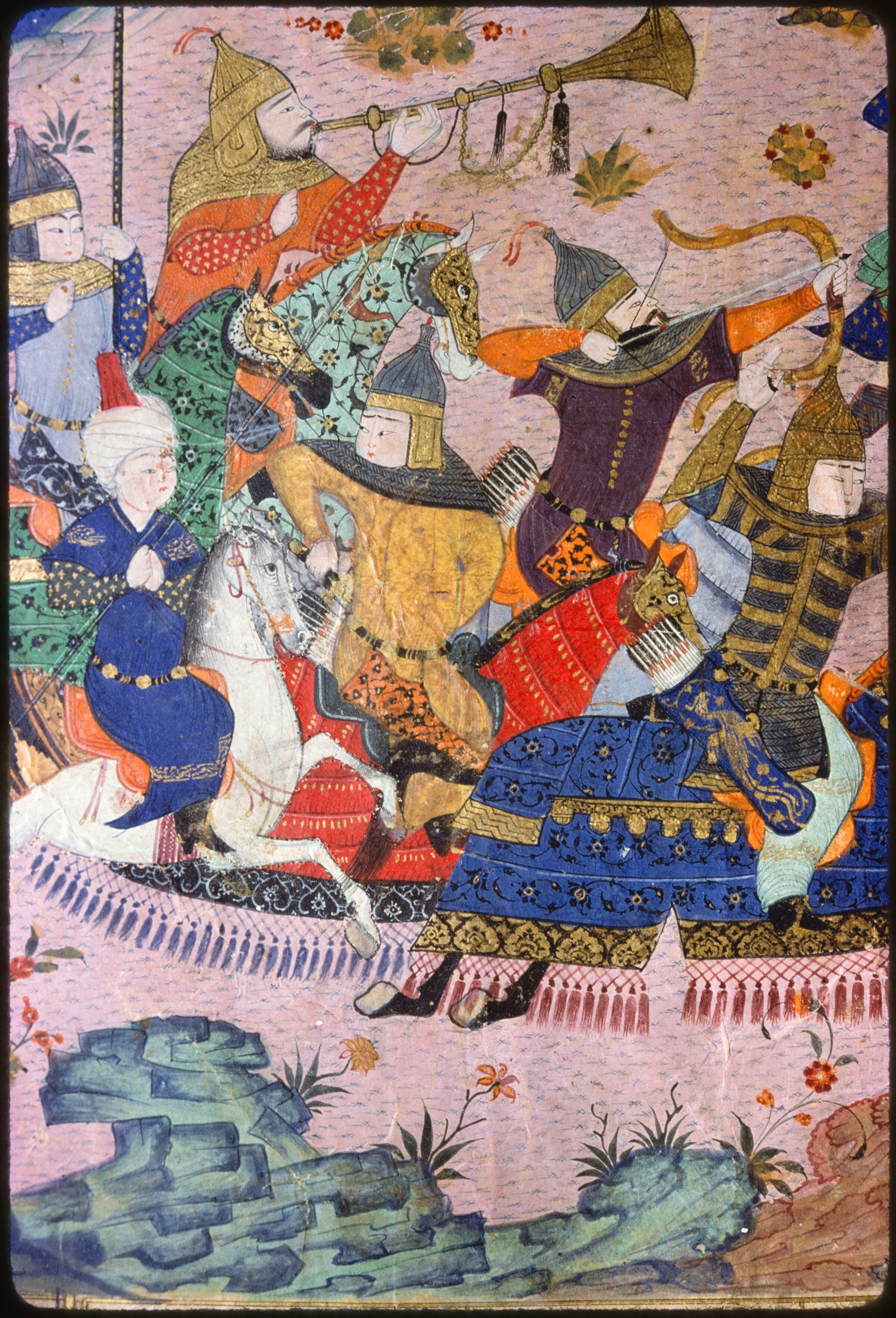
Cavalry charge with Qizilbash horseman wearing the Taj-e Haydari headdress. Dastan-i Jamal u Jalal, commissioned under Shah Ismail in 1502–1505, Tabriz.

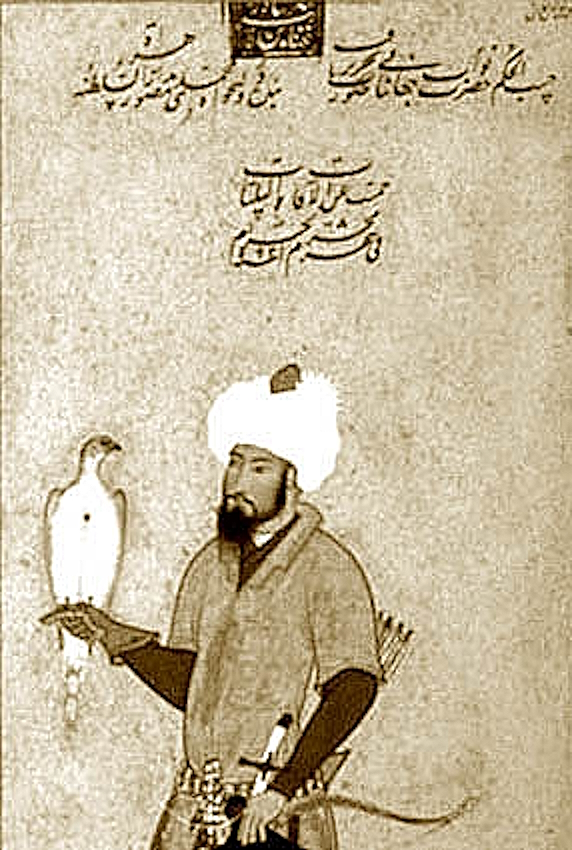
Portrait of Ali-Qoli Khan Shamlu (aka Haji Ali Qizilbash Mazandarani), Governor of Khorassan in 1576 and chief of the armies under Shah Abbas I in 1588. Painted in 1584.

The main followers of the Safavids were the Qizilbash from Azerbaijan and Anatolia. In 1501, 7,000 Qizilbash defeated the 30,000-strong army of Sultan Alvand Aq Qoyunlu, and after the coronation in Tabriz, the young Sheikh Ismail became the first Shahanshah of Azerbaijan from the Safavid dynasty. Ismail received the main support for his accession to the throne from the Qizilbash, but did not enjoy the same support in Iran and even faced resentment and hatred from the majority of Sunni Iranians. (Note: "His aim was to consolidate his hold over Iran, Mesopotamia and eastern Anatolia. Faruk Sümer is right to emphasize that without the help of thousands of Qizilbash followers from Anatolia, Shah Ismaʿil would not have been able to defeat Aqquyunlu leaders and achieve these momentous victories. He did not enjoy that kind of support in Iran and even faced the resentment and hatred of the majority Sunni Iranians." Quoted from Zarinebaf (2019), p. 311.) He had to ensure the speedy arrival of the Qizilbash from Asia Minor, since in the eyes of the Persians of Iran he and his supporters were strangers whom they hated. Ismail's success was greatly influenced by his detachment of seven close Qizilbash advisers.,

The rise of the Ottomans put a great strain on the Turkmen tribes living in the area, which eventually led them to join the Safavids, who transformed them into a militant organisation, called the Qizilbash (meaning "red heads" in Turkish), initially a pejorative label given to them by the Ottomans, but later adopted as a mark of pride. The religion of the Qizilbash resembled much more the heterodox beliefs of northwestern Iran and eastern Anatolia, rather than the traditional Twelver Shia Islam. The beliefs of the Qizilbash consisted of non-Islamic aspects, varying from crypto-Zoroastrian beliefs to shamanistic practises, the latter which had been practised by their Central Asian ancestors.

However, a common aspect that all these heterodox beliefs shared was a form of messianism, devoid of the restrictions of the Islam practiced in urban areas. Concepts of divine inspiration and reincarnation were common, with the Qizilbash viewing their Safavid leader (whom they called morshed-e kamel, "the Perfect Guide") as the reincarnation of Ali and a manifestation of the divine in human form. There were a total of seven major Qizilbash "tribes", each named after an area they identified themselves with; the Rumlu presumably came from Rum (Anatolia); the Shamlu from Sham (Syria); the Takkalu from the Takkeh in southeastern Anatolia; the Ostajlu from Ostaj in the southern Caucasus. It is uncertain if the Afshar and Qajar were named after an area in Azerbaijan, or after their ancestors. All these tribes shared a common lifestyle, language, faith, and animosity towards the Ottomans.

In the 15th century, Ardabil was the center of an organization designed to keep the Safavi leadership in close touch with its murids in Azerbaijan, Iraq, Eastern Anatolia, and elsewhere. The organization was controlled through the office of khalīfāt al-khulafā'ī who appointed representatives (khalīfa) in regions where Safavi propaganda was active. The khalīfa, in turn, had subordinates termed pira. The Safavi presence in eastern Anatolia posed a serious threat to the Ottoman Empire because they encouraged the Shi'i population of Asia Minor to revolt against the sultan.

In 1499, Ismail, the young leader of the Safavi order, left Lahijan for Ardabil to make a bid for power. By the summer of 1500, about 7,000 supporters from the local Turcoman tribes of Asia Minor (Anatolia), Syria, and the Caucasus – collectively called "Qizilbash" by their enemies – rallied to his support in Erzincan. Leading his troops on a punitive campaign against the Shīrvanshāh (ruler of Shirvan), he sought revenge for the death of his father and his grandfather in Shīrvan. After defeating the Shīrvanshāh Farrukh Yassar and incorporating his kingdom, he moved south into Azarbaijan, where his 7,000 Qizilbash warriors defeated a force of 30,000 Aq Qoyunlu under Alwand Mirzā and conquered Tabriz. This was the beginning of the Safavid state.

By 1510, Ismail and his Qizilbash had conquered the whole of Iran and the Republic of Azerbaijan, southern Dagestan (with its important city of Derbent), Mesopotamia, Armenia, Khorasan, Eastern Anatolia, and had made the Georgian kingdoms of Kartli and Kakheti his vassals. Many of these areas were priorly under the control of the Ak Koyunlu.

The rivalry between the Turkic clans and the Persian nobles was a major problem in the Safavid kingdom. As V. Minorsky put it, friction between these two groups was inevitable, because the Turcomans "were no party to the national Persian tradition". Shah Ismail tried to solve the problem by appointing Persian wakils as commanders of Qizilbash tribes. The Turcomans considered this an insult and brought about the death of 3 of the 5 Persians appointed to this office – an act that later inspired the deprivation of the Turcomans by Shah Abbas I.

In 1510, Shah Ismail sent a large force of the Qizilbash to Transoxiania to fight the Uzbeks. The Qizilbash defeated the Uzbeks and secured Samarkand at the Battle of Marv. However, in 1512, an entire Qizilbash army was annihilated by the Uzbeks after Turcoman Qizilbash had mutinied against their Persian wakil and commander Najm-e Thani at the Battle of Ghazdewan. This defeat put an end to Safavid expansion and influence in Transoxania and left the northeastern frontiers of the kingdom vulnerable to nomad invasions, until some decades later.

=== Battle of Chaldiran ===
Meanwhile, the Safavid dawah continued in Ottoman areas — with great success. Even more alarming for the Ottomans was the successful conversion of Turcoman tribes in Eastern Anatolia, and the recruitment of these well-experienced and feared fighters into the growing Safavid army. To stop Safavid propaganda, Sultan Bayezid II deported large numbers of the Shi'i population of Asia Minor to Morea. However, in 1507, Shah Ismail and the Qizilbash overran large areas of Kurdistan, defeating regional Ottoman forces. Two years later, the Qizilbash defeated the Uzbeks at Merv in Central Asia, killing their leader Muhammad Shaybani and destroying his dynasty. His head was sent to the Ottoman sultan as a warning.

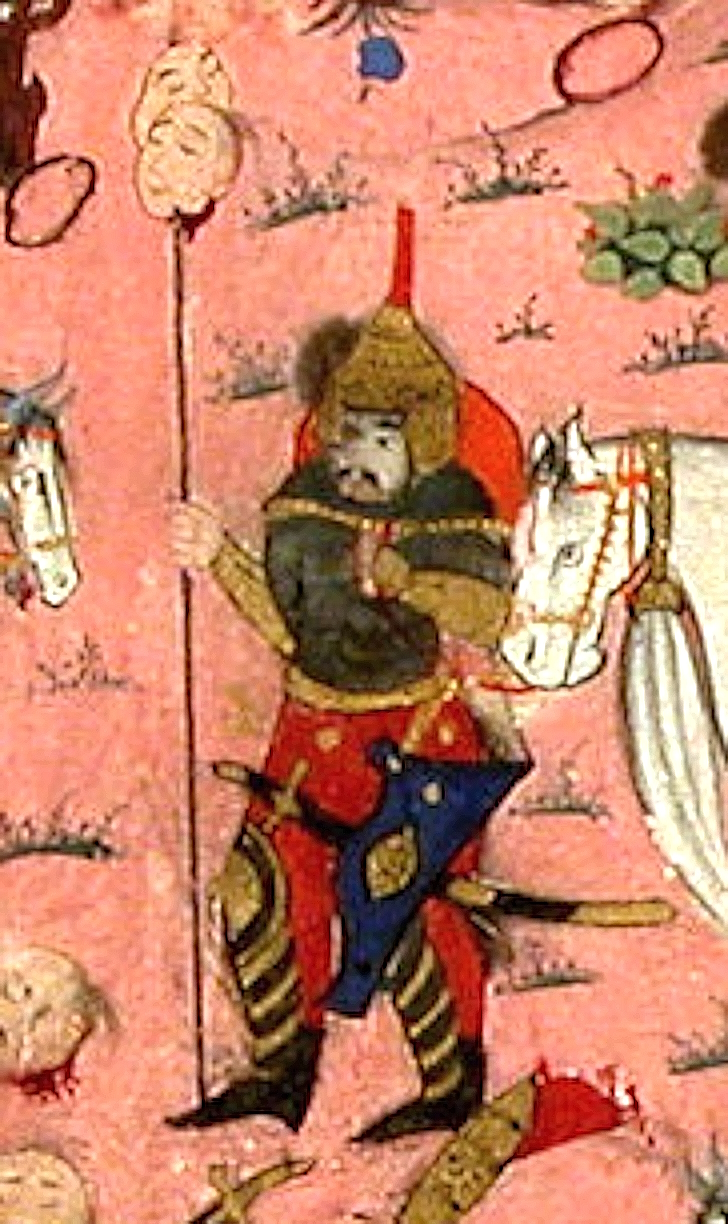
Safavid heavy Qizilbash soldier, at the 1578 Battle of Mollahasanli. Şeca'atname (1598)

In 1511, a pro-Safavid revolt known as the Şahkulu rebellion broke out in Teke. An imperial army that was sent to suppress it was defeated. Ismail sought to turn the chaos within the Ottoman Empire to his advantage and moved the border westwards in Asia Minor. The Qizilbash defeated a large Ottoman army under Koca Sinan Pasha. Shocked by this heavy defeat, Sultan Selim I, the new ruler, decided to invade with a force of 200,000 Ottomans. In addition, he ordered the persecution of Alevis and massacred its adherents in the Ottoman Empire.

On 20 August 1514 (1st Rajab 920 A.H.), the two armies met at Chaldiran in northwestern Iran. The Ottomans, who were equipped with both firearms and cannon, were reported to outnumber the Qizilbash as much as three to one. The Qizilbash were badly defeated; casualties included many high-ranking Qizilbash amirs as well as three influential ulamā.

This defeat destroyed Shah Ismail's belief in his own invincibility and divine status. It also fundamentally altered the relationship between the murshid-e kāmil and his murids (followers).

=== The deprivation of the Turcomans ===
Ismail I tried to reduce the power of the Turcomans by appointing Iranians to the vakil office. However, the Turcomans did not like having an Iranian to the most powerful office of the Safavid Empire and kept murdering many Iranians who were appointed to that office. After the death of Ismail, the Turkomans managed to seize power from the Iranians, they were however, defeated by Tahmasp I, the son of Ismail who got rid of the Turcomans.

For almost ten years after the Battle of Chaldiran, rival Qizilbash factions fought for control of the kingdom. In 1524, 10-year-old Shah Tahmasp I, the governor of Herat, succeeded his father Ismail. He was the ward of the powerful Qizilbash amir Ali Beg Rūmlū (titled "Div Soltān") who was the de facto ruler of the Safavid kingdom. However, Tahmasp managed to reassert his authority over the state and over the Qizilbash.

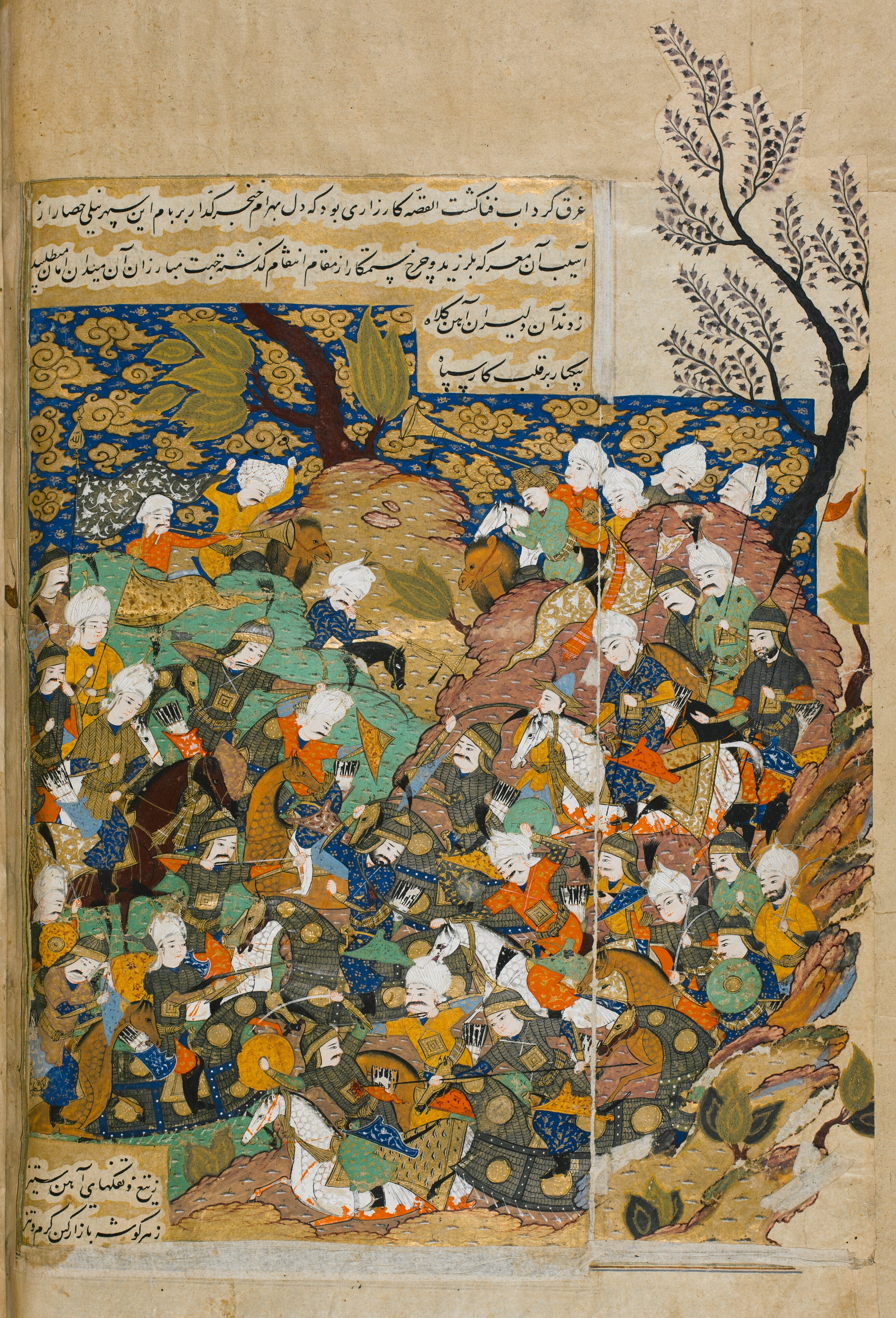
Battle of Prince Hamzeh Mirza against rebellious Qizilbash emirs. Ḫulāṣat at-tawārīḫ, circa 1595

During the reign of Shah Tahmasp, the Qizilbash fought a series of wars on two fronts and — with the poor resources available to them — successfully defended their kingdom against the Uzbeks in the east, and against the arch-rivals of the Safavids — the Ottomans — in the west. With the Peace of Amasya (1555), peace between Safavids and Ottomans remained for the rest of Tahmasp's reign. During Tahmasp' reign, he carried out multiple invasions in the Caucasus which had been incorporated in the Safavid empire since Shah Ismail I and for many centuries afterward, and started with the trend of deporting and moving hundreds of thousands of Circassians, Georgians, and Armenians to Iran's heartlands. Initially only solely put in the royal harems, royal guards, and several other specific posts of the Empire, Tahmasp believed he could eventually reduce the power of the Qizilbash, by creating and fully integrating a new layer in Iranian society with these Caucasian elements and who would question the power and hegemony of the tribal Qizilbash. This included the formation of a military slave system, similar to that of the neighboring Ottoman Empire – the Janissaries. Tahmasp's successors, and most importantly Shah Abbas I (r. 1588–1629), would significantly expand this policy when during the reign of Abbas I alone some 200,000 Georgians, 300,000 Armenians and many tens of thousands of Circassians were relocated to Iran's heartlands. By this creation of a so-called "third layer" or "third force" in Iranian society composed of ethnic Caucasians, and the complete systematic disorganisation of the Qizilbash by his personal orders, Abbas I eventually fully succeeded in replacing the power of the Qizilbash, with that of the Caucasian ghulams. These new Caucasian elements (the so-called ghilman / غِلْمَان / "servants"), almost always after conversion to Shi'ism depending on given function would be, unlike the Qizilbash, fully loyal only to the Shah. This system of mass usage of Caucasian subjects continued to exist until the fall of the Qajar dynasty.

The inter-tribal rivalry of the Turcomans, the attempt of Persian nobles to end the Turcoman dominance, and constant succession conflicts went on for another 10 years after Tahmasp's death. This heavily weakened the Safavid state and made the kingdom vulnerable to external enemies: the Ottomans attacked in the west, whereas the Uzbeks attacked the east.

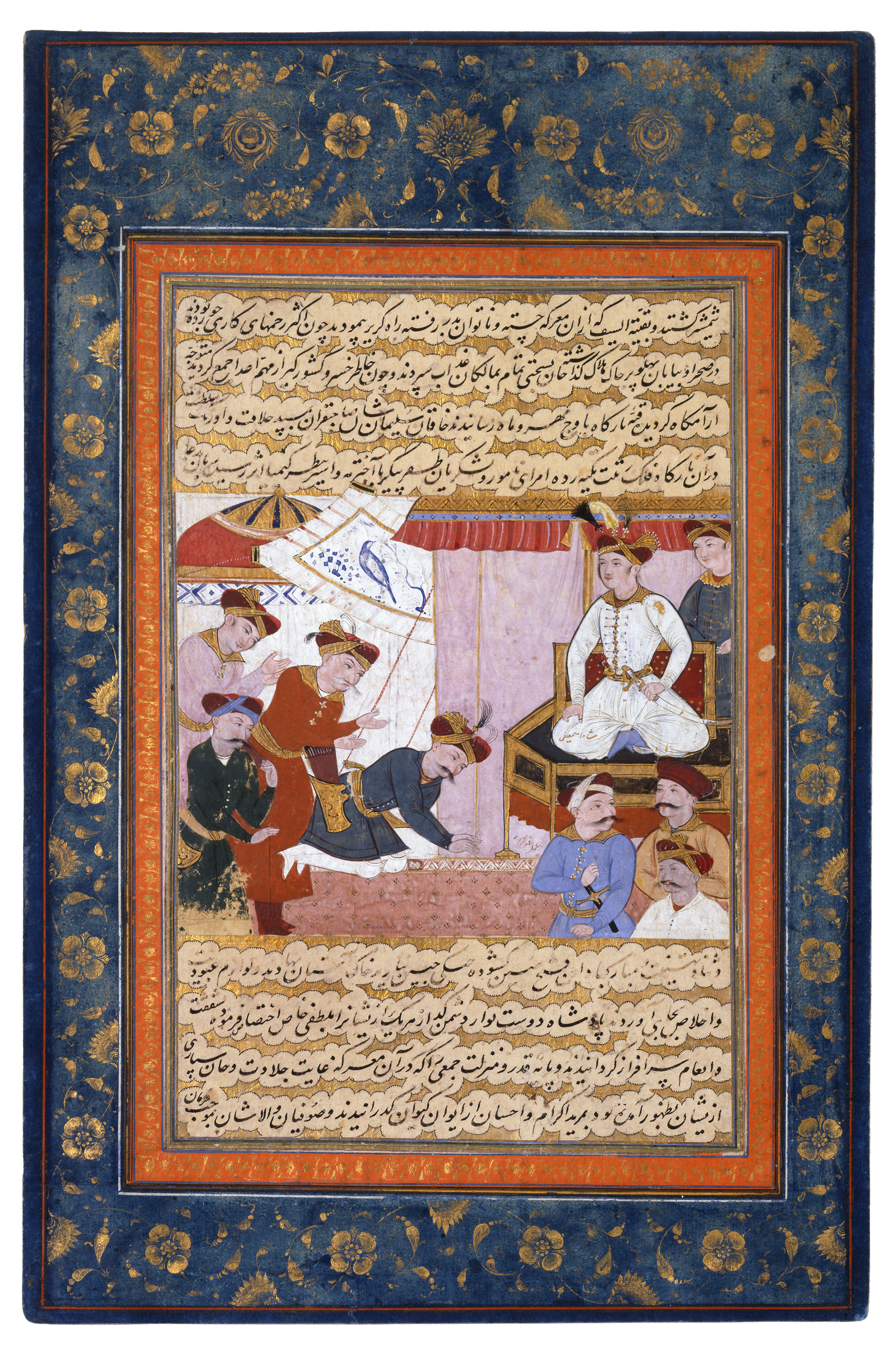
Persian miniature created by Mo'en Mosavver, depicting Shah Ismail I at an audience receiving the Qizilbash after they defeated the Shirvanshah Farrukh Yasar. Album leaf from a copy of Bijan’s Tarikh-i Jahangusha-yi Khaqan Sahibqiran (A History of Shah Ismail I), produced in Isfahan, end of the 1680s

In 1588, Shah Abbas I came to power. He appointed the Governor of Herat and his former guardian and tutor, Alī Quli Khān Shāmlū (also known as Hājī Alī Qizilbāsh Mazandarānī) the chief of all the armed forces. Later on, events of the past, including the role of the Turcomans in the succession struggles after the death of his father, and the counterbalancing influence of traditional Ithnāʻashari Shia Sayeds, made him determined to end the dominance of the untrustworthy Turcoman chiefs in Persia which Tahmasp had already started decades before him. In order to weaken the Turcomans – the important militant elite of the Safavid kingdom – Shah Abbas further raised a standing army, personal guard, Queen-Mothers, Harems and full civil administration from the ranks of these ghilman who were usually ethnic Circassians, Georgians, and Armenians, both men and women, whom he and his predecessors had taken captive en masse during their wars in the Caucasus, and would systematically replace the Qizilbash from their functions with converted Circassians and Georgians. The new army and civil administration would be fully loyal to the king personally and not to the clan-chiefs anymore.

The reorganisation of the army also ended the independent rule of Turcoman chiefs in the Safavid provinces, and instead centralized the administration of those provinces.

Ghulams were appointed to high positions within the royal household, and by the end of Shah Abbas' reign, one-fifth of the high-ranking amirs were ghulams. By 1598 already an ethnic Georgian from Safavid-ruled Georgia, well known by his adopted Muslim name after conversion, Allahverdi Khan, had risen to the position of commander-in-chief of all Safavid armed forces. and by that became one of the most powerful men in the empire. The offices of wakil and amir al-umarā fell in disuse and were replaced by the office of a Sipahsālār (Persian: سپهسالار, lit. 'master of the army'), commander-in-chief of all armed forces – Turcoman and Non-Turcoman – and usually held by a Persian (Tādjik) noble.

The Turcoman Qizilbash nevertheless remained an important part of the Safavid executive apparatus, even though ethnic Caucasians came to largely replace them. For example, even in the 1690s, when ethnic Georgians formed the mainstay of the Safavid military, the Qizilbash still played a significant role in the army. The Afshār and Qājār rulers of Iran who succeeded the Safavids, stemmed from a Qizilbash background. Many other Qizilbash – Turcoman and Non-Turcoman – were settled in far eastern cities such as Kabul and Kandahar during the conquests of Nader Shah, and remained there as consultants to the new Afghan crown after the Shah's death. Others joined the Mughal emperors of India and became one of the most influential groups of the Mughal court until the British conquest of India.

== Legacy ==
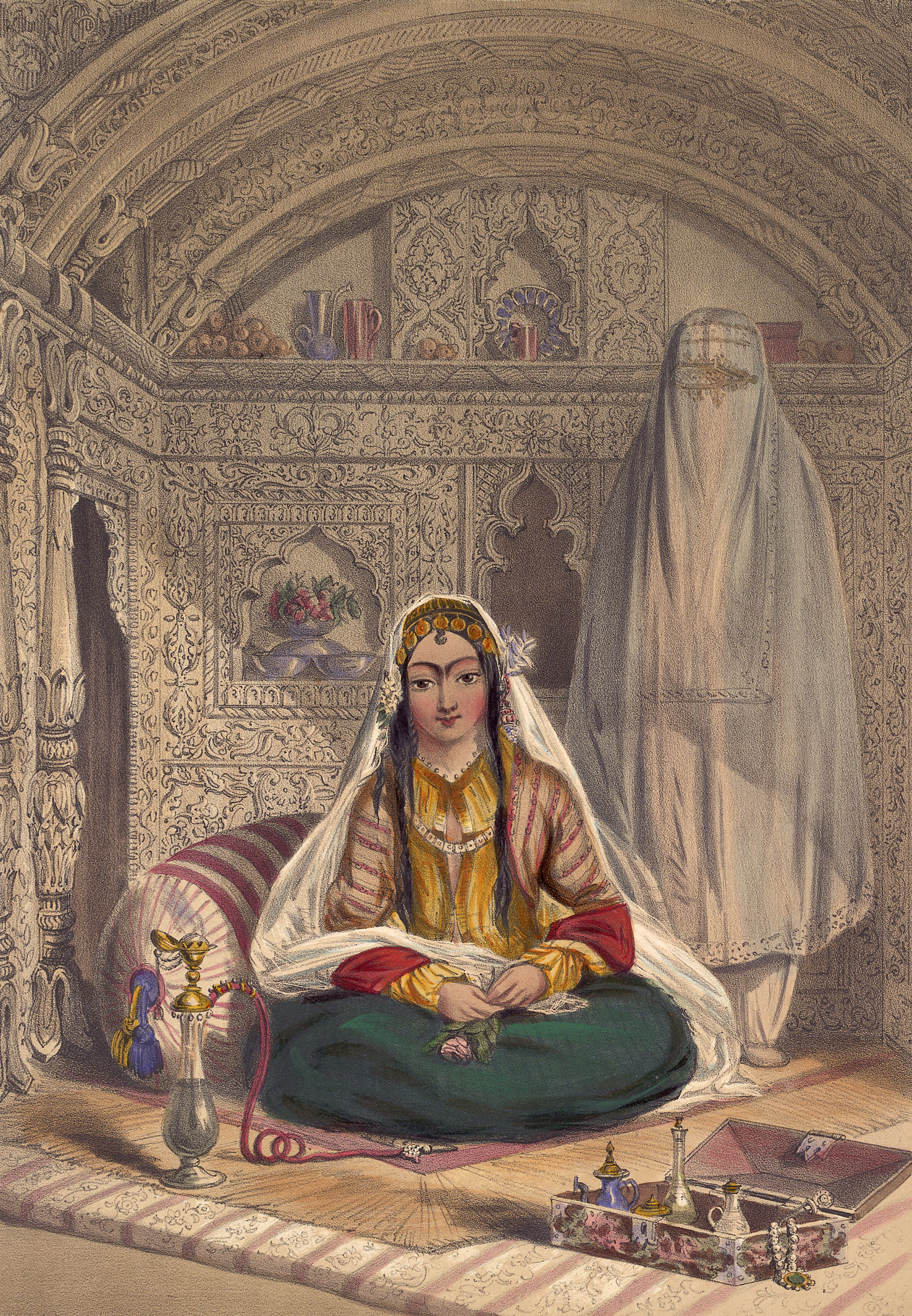
Afghan Qizilbash lady in Kabul

=== Afghanistan ===
Qizilbash in Afghanistan primarily live in urban areas, such as Kabul, Kandahar or Herat. Some of them are descendants of the troops left behind by Nadir Shah. (Note: "The Qizilbash, or "Red Heads," were Turkic warriors-turned-Persian who had arrived in Afghanistan in numbers after Nadir Shah's and other Persian debacles." Quoted from Tanner (2009), p. 124.) (Note: "Some of Nadir's Qizilbash soldiers settled in Afghanistan where their descendants had successful careers in the army (until the end of Dost Muhammad's rule), government, the trades, and crafts." Quoted from Adamec (2012), pp. 305–6.) Others however were brought to the country during the Durrani rule, Zaman Shah Durrani had over 100,000 cavalry, consisting mostly of Qizilbash. (Note: "According to Husaini, the "gholam Khana" furnished 15,000 out of Shah Zaman's total cavalry of 100,000 and consisted mostly of Qizilbash. Burnes reports that the Qizilbash retained a great degree of their autonomous organization and only pledged direct allegiance to their individual khans, who were in turn answerable to the king. This statement is borne out by the fact that the command of the entire bodyguard rested with the Qizilbash leader Mahmud Khan Bayat during 'Timur Shah's time. Up to Shah Zaman's reign the Khorasani contingents were listed according to tribal allegiance." Quoted from Noelle (1997), p. 26.) Afghanistan's Qizilbash held important posts in government offices in the past, and today engage in trade or are craftsmen. Since the creation of Afghanistan, they constitute an important and politically influential element of society. Estimates of their population vary from 30,000 to 200,000. (Note: "Obtaining accurate population figures for the Qizilbash in Afghanistan and Pakistan is virtually impossible because they claim to be Sunni, Tajik, Farsiwan, or Pashtun, or they identify themselves according to their place of origin in India. Population estimates for Afghanistan range from 30,000 to 200,000, but some suggest the figure is closer to one million. The story is similar in Pakistan. Few influential Qizilbash live in Iran, their original home..." Quoted from "Qizilbash". Countries and Their Cultures Forum.) (Note: "In 1996, approximately 40 percent of Afghans were Pashtun, 11.4 of whom are of the Durrani tribal group and 13.8 percent of the Ghilzai group. Tajiks make up the second-largest ethnic group with 25.3 percent of the population, followed by Hazaras, 18 percent; Uzbeks, 6.3 percent; Turkmen, 2.5 percent; Qizilbash, 1.0; 6.9 percent other. The usual caveat regarding statistics is particularly appropriate here." Quoted from Afghanistan: A Country Study (2001), p. 104.)

Sir Mountstuart Elphinstone described the Qizilbash of Kabul in the beginning of the 19th century as "a colony of Turks," who spoke "Persian, and among themselves Turkish." Described as learned, affluent, and influential, they appear to have abandoned their native Turkish language in favour of Persian, and became "in fact Persianized Turks". Lady Florentia Sale (wife of Sir Robert Henry Sale) and Vincent Eyre – both companions of Sir Mountstuart Elphinstone – described the Qizilbash of Afghanistan also as "Persians, of Persian descent, or descendant of the Persians, wearing a red cap".

The influence of the Qizilbash in the government created resentment among the ruling Pashtun clans, especially after the Qizilbash openly allied themselves with the British during the First Anglo-Afghan War (1839–1842). During Abdur Rahman Khan's massacre of the Shi'i minorities in Afghanistan, the Qizilbash were declared "enemies of the state" and were persecuted and hunted by the government and by the Sunni majority.

The former national anthem (2006-2021) of Afghanistan mentioned Qizilbash as an ethnic group in the third line of third stanza.

Ehsan Bayat family belongs to the Qizilbash community of Afghanistan.

=== India ===
The Qizilbash Safavid army helped Mughal Emperor, Humayun recapture the throne of India from Sikandar Shah Suri of the Sur Empire. Prominent amongst them (the Qizilbash) was Bairam Khan, the regent and chief mentor to Akbar the Great.

The rise of the Durrani Empire in the 18th century started a fierce cold war in Afghanistan, and subsequently a fight for racial supremacy began between the aboriginal Pashtuns and the Turkic Qizilbash. This resulted in major migrations of the Qizilbash people out of Afghanistan to the safe havens of India in order to avoid persecution on political, racial and religious grounds. They migrated in mass numbers and settled in old cities of the current Indian regions of Awadh, Kashmir and Punjab.

The Qizilbash in India are Shias by denomination. The Qizilbash of Kashmir use the title, Agha and belong to the Syed caste. The Qizilbash in Awadh use the title, Nawab, which was awarded to them by representatives the British crown.

Famous Indian poet, Agha Shahid Ali and his family members, including Agha Shaukat Ali and Begum Zaffar Ali, belonged to the illustrious Syed Agha family, tracing their roots back to the Qizilbash of Afghanistan's Kandahar. Amir Qazalbash, another famous Indian poet, also belonged to a Qizilbash family settled in Delhi.

=== Iran ===
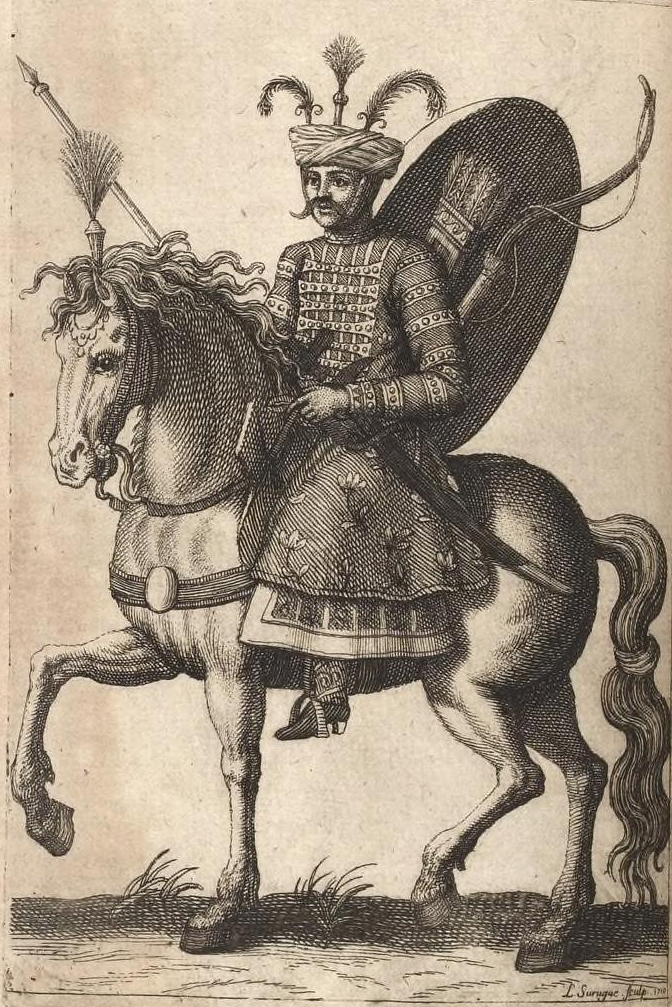
In Jean Chardin's book, 1666.

Following Shah Abbas's gradual replacement of the Qizilbash in the Safavid military and administrative ranks, and the persecution they faced at the hands of his and Shah Safi's policies, the Qizilbash started to turn and rebel against the Safavids. This then led to the empire adopting more classical Twelver beliefs and cooperating with Shi'i scholars in combatting Qizilbash doctrines, eventually causing their decline in favour of a more orthodox interpretation of Twelver Shi'ism.

=== Bulgaria, Greece and Romania ===
A strip of land from Babadag in Romania until Dimetoka in Greece is the land of Qizilbash nowadays. This strip includes a part of eastern Bulgaria. Most of the Qizilbash settled in Dobruja in large numbers, either voluntarily or by being deported there from Anatolia by the Ottoman authorities between the 15th and 17th centuries. Qizilbash communities are also present in Ludogorie (Deliorman).

The Qizilbash conceal their real identity, outwardly professing to be orthodox Sunnis to their Turkish or Bulgarian neighbours, or alternatively claim to be Bektashis, depending who is addressing them. According to the 1992 census, there were 85,773 Shiites in Bulgaria.

=== Syria/Lebanon ===
Between the late seventeenth century and 1822, the term "Qizilbash" was also used in Ottoman administrative documents to identify Twelver (Imami) Shiites in what is today Lebanon. The Ottomans were aware they had no link to the Anatolian or Iranian Qizilbash, employing the term only as a means to delegitimize them or justify punitive campaigns against them. In the early eighteenth century, a part of northern Lebanon is even described as the "Kızılbaş mukataa" tax district.

=== Turkey ===
In Turkey, there is a community Alevis, which were formed out of Qizilbash groups in Anatolia in the 16th century. Historically, however, it wouldn't be appropriate to use the term Alevi to describe these groups, seeing as it was originally used for descendants of Ali, the fourth Rashidun Caliph. In the 19th century, the term was also used in Turkey to refer to the Qizilbash, who were seen as heretics by the Sunni majority. Alevism in Turkey is present among the Turkish, Kurdish, as well as the Zaza population. Yet, despite speaking Kurdish and Zaza natively, many of the Alevi tribes still use Turkish as a liturgical language. The Kurdish Alevis are known locally by the term Kızılbaş, associating them with the Qizilbash in the Safavid dynasty, although their exact origins are unclear and subject to debate. Among Bektashis, Kızılbaş is used to refer to groups that are not initiated into the Bektashi order but have similar beliefs. These groups are looked down upon by initiated members of the tariqa.

In the second half of the 19th century, a Western interest in the origins and political orientations of the Qizilbash sparked, resulting in them becoming the target of Western missionaries, who believed that they held Christian views about Jesus. The Qizilbash weren't hostile towards these missionaries and, according to missionary reports, some were willing to listen to their message. In turn, the Ottoman authorities responded by making more efforts to classify the Qizilbash as Muslims, though the Qizilbash did not always accept these efforts, such that they would openly decline them at times. Despite such adversarial interactions, a clear picture of how these groups perceived their relations with the Ottoman government or the Western missionaries has not yet been established. Hans-Lukas Kieser talks about an "Alevi renaissance" which, according to him, took place in the Tanzimat period, as well as later, after the Young Turk Revolution. There are some doubts, though, whether this term is appropriate, due to the scarcity of sources and the diversity of the various Qizilbash-groups.

It has been reported that, among the Ottoman Turks, kızılbaş has become something of a derogatory term and can be applied to groups that aren't necessarily associated with the Kazilbash of Central Asia. The Bektaşi in Turkey are often referred to as Kızılbaşi.

== See also ==
- Aleviler
- Bektashism and folk religion
- Afghan Qizilbash
- Khamseh
- Mirza Kalich Beg
- Alawites

== General sources ==
- Afghanistan: A Country Study. Baton Rouge LA: Claitor's Publishing Division. 2001. ISBN 9781579807443.
- Adamec, Ludwig W. (2012). "Nadir Shah Afshar". Historical Dictionary of Afghanistan (4th ed.). Lanham MD: Scarecrow Press. ISBN 9780810878150.
- Amanat, Abbas (2017). Iran: A Modern History. Yale University Press. ISBN 978-0300112542.
- Aslanian, Sebouh (2011). From the Indian Ocean to the Mediterranean: The Global Trade Networks of Armenian Merchants from New Julfa. California: University of California Press. ISBN 978-0520947573.
- Babayan, Kathryn (1993). The Waning of the Qizilbash: The Spiritual and the Temporal in Seventeenth Century Iran. Princeton University.
- Blow, David (2009). Shah Abbas: The Ruthless King Who Became an Iranian Legend. I.B.Tauris. ISBN 9780857716767.
- Bomati, Yves; Nahavandi, Houchang (2017). Shah Abbas, Emperor of Persia,1587–1629. Translated by Azodi, Azizeh. Los Angeles: Ketab Co. ISBN 978-1595845672.
- Bournoutian, George (2002). A Concise History of the Armenian People: (from Ancient Times to the Present) (2 ed.). Mazda Publishers. p. 208. ISBN 978-1568591414.
- Chabrier, Aurélie (2013). La monarchie safavide et la modernité européenne (XVIe-XVIIe siècles) (PhD thesis) (in French). Université Toulouse le Mirail - Toulouse II.
- Floor, Willem M.; Herzig, Edmund (2012). Iran and the World in the Safavid Age. I.B.Tauris. ISBN 978-1850439301.
- Grigoriev, Sergei (2000). "Об этнической принадлежности шиитов Афганистана" [On the ethnicity of the Shiites of Afghanistan]. Восток: история и культура (in Russian).
- Kia, Mana (2020). \Persianate Selves: Memories of Place and Origin Before Nationalism. Stanford University Press. ISBN 978-1503611955.
- Mikaberidze, Alexander (2015). Historical Dictionary of Georgia (2nd ed.). Rowman & Littlefield. ISBN 978-1442241466.
- Momen, Moojan (1985). An Introduction to Shi'i Islam. Yale Univ. Press. ISBN 9780300034998.
- Noelle, Christine (1997). State and Tribe in Nineteenth-Century Afghanistan: The Reign of Amir Dost Muhammad Khan (1826-1863). Routledge. ISBN 9780700706297.
- Rothman, E. Nathalie (2015). Brokering Empire: Trans-Imperial Subjects between Venice and Istanbul. Cornell University Press. ISBN 978-0801463129.
- Savory, Roger M. (1980). Iran Under the Safavids. Cambridge University Press. ISBN 9780521224833.
- Savory, Roger M. (1986). "Kizil-Bash". In C.E. Bosworth; et al. (eds.). Encyclopaedia of Islam. Vol. V (Khe-Mahi) (EI2 - 2nd ed.). Brill. ISBN 9004078193.
- Savory, Roger M. (1995). "Safawids". In C.E. Bosworth; et al. (eds.). Encyclopaedia of Islam. Vol. VIII (Ned–Sam) (EI2 - 2nd ed.). Brill. ISBN 9004098348.
- Savory, Roger M.; Karamustafa, Ahmet T. (2017) [1998]. "Esmāʿīl I Ṣafawī". In Yarshater, Ehsan (ed.). Encyclopædia Iranica (Online ed.). Encyclopædia Iranica Foundation.
- Streusand, Douglas E. (2011). Islamic Gunpowder Empires: Ottomans, Safavids, and Mughals. Westview Press. ISBN 9780813313597.
- Tanner, Stephen (2009) [2002]. Afghanistan: A Military History from Alexander the Great to the War Against the Taliban. Da Capo Press. ISBN 9780306818264.
- Zarinebaf, Fariba (2019). "Azerbaijan between Two Empires: A Contested Borderland in the Early Modern Period (Sixteenth‒Eighteenth Centuries)". Iranian Studies. 52 (3–4): 299–337. doi:10.1080/00210862.2019.1646121.
