= Journal of Nonlinear Science =

Peer-reviewed scientific journal

- Discipline: Nonlinear systems
- Language: English
- Edited by: Anthony M. Bloch, Alain Goriely, Paul K. Newton

Publication details
- History: 1991—present
- Publisher: Springer
- Frequency: Bimonthly
- Impact factor: 2.9 (2024)

Standard abbreviations
- ISO 4: J. Nonlinear Sci.

Indexing
- CODEN: JNSCEK
- ISSN: 0938-8974 (print); 1432-1467 (web)

Links
- Journal homepage; Online access; Online archive

Journal of Nonlinear Science is a peer-reviewed scientific journal published bimonthly by Springer Science+Business Media. Established in 1991, it covers theoretical, numerical and experimental research in nonlinear systems and phenomena. Its current editor-in-chiefs are Anthony M. Bloch (University of Michigan), Alain Goriely (University of Oxford) and Paul K. Newton (University of Southern California).

== Abstracting and indexing ==
The journal is abstracted and indexed in:

- Current Contents/Physical, Chemical & Earth Sciences
- EBSCO
- Ei Compendex
- Inspec
- MathSciNet
- ProQuest databases
- Science Citation Index Expanded
- Scopus
- zbMATH Open

According to the Journal Citation Reports, the journal has a 2024 impact factor of 2.9.
