= Anne Fontaine (designer) =

Paris-based fashion designer (born 1 November 1971)

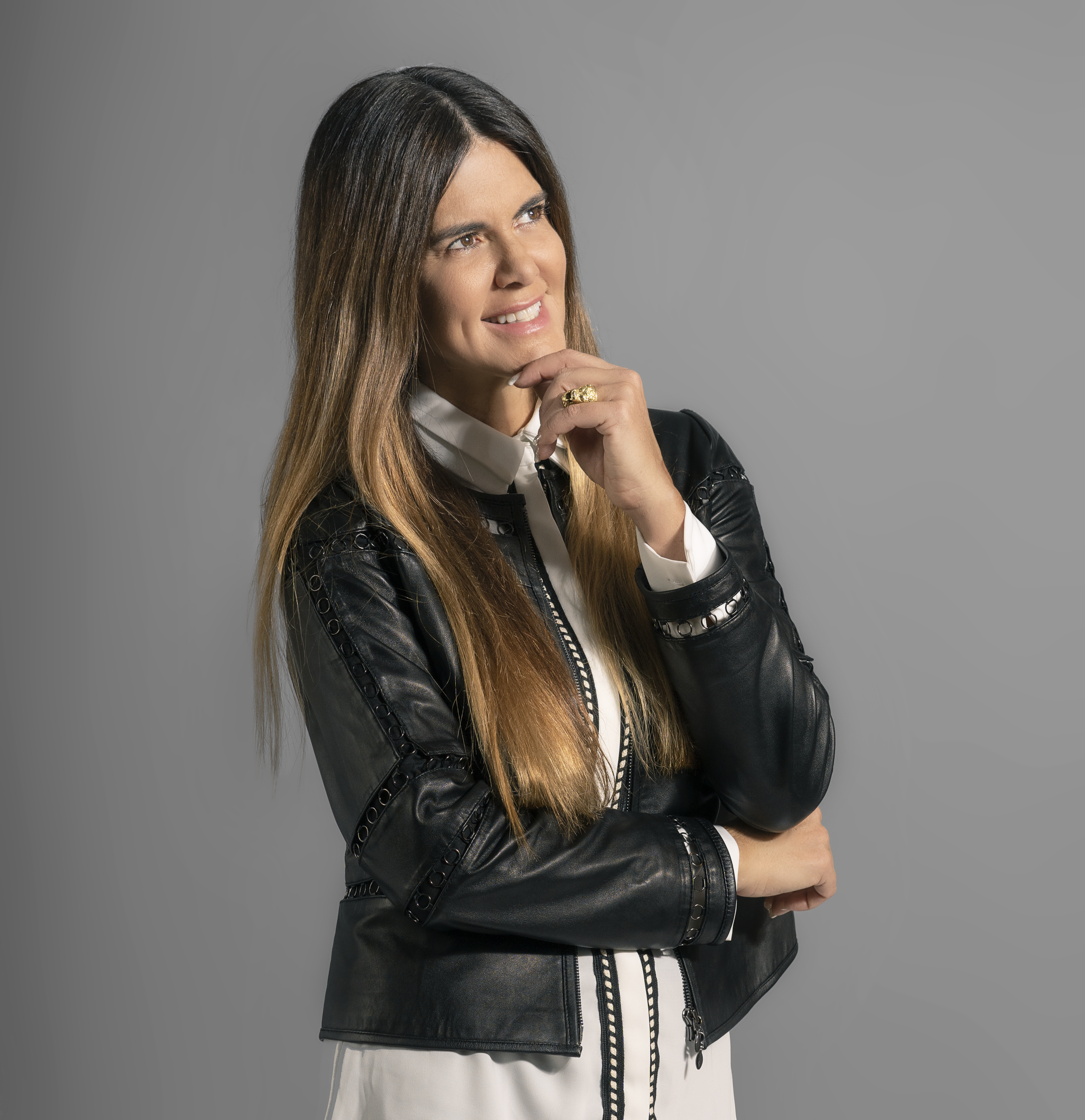
- French Luxury Women's Ready To Wear Designer Anne Fontaine
- Born: 1 November 1971 (age 54); Rio de Janeiro, Brazil
- Occupation: Fashion designer
- Website: annefontaine.com

Anne Adélia Cristina Maria Tereza Fontaine (born 1 November 1971) is a Paris-based fashion designer of ready-to-wear for women, businesswoman and ecologist. Fontaine is the creative director of the Anne Fontaine brand and the President of the Anne Fontaine Foundation.

== Early life and education ==
Fontaine was born and raised in Rio de Janeiro, the daughter of MP Waas and LA Costa Moreira.

Fontaine attended the Santa Marcelina school in Rio de Janeiro. She then attended Universidade Gama Filho (UGF). Fontaine has stated that an experience living for six months with the Canela tribe in Amazonia was seminal towards developing her interest in preserving the environment. At the age of 18, Fontaine moved to France to study biology.

== Career ==
=== Early work ===
Fontaine has stated that she began drawing and sketching clothes at a young age. The inspiration for the first collection of white shirts came after she discovered a trunk of white shirts in the attic of the family home of her husband, Ari Zlotkin. At that time Zlotkin was managing his family business manufacturing men's white shirts, based in Honfleur, Normandy.

=== Fashion label ===
Main article: Anne Fontaine (brand)

Fontaine co-founded her brand Anne Fontaine with Zlotkin, and launched her first collection at the age of 22. She opened her first store in the Saint-Germain area of Paris in 1994. Fontaine followed with stores in Boston and Tokyo in 1995.

Since launching, the company now operates 60 stores worldwide (28 of which are in the United States). While the brand is still known for its iconic white women's shirts, the fashion line has expanded to include ready-to-wear clothing, accessories, handbags and shoes. In 2003 Fontaine launched her first handbag line, and in 2008, launched a collection crafted by French artisans called Les Precieuses.

=== Awards ===
Fontaine received the French National Order of Merit and received the award of l'élan de Mode in 2006 (French Federation of Fashion).

== Philanthropy ==
In 2011, Fontaine created the New York-based Anne Fontaine Foundation, to support the protection of endangered forests and promote reforestation. The Foundation's projects are focused on the Brazilian Atlantic forest, also known as the Mata Atlântica. To-date, the Foundation has planted 40,000 trees.

== Personal life ==
Fontaine and Zlotkin have three children and reside in New York City.
