= The Country Without a Post Office =

Collection of poems by Agha Shahid Ali

- Cover of first US hardcover edition (1997), also used for US paperback edition
- Author: Agha Shahid Ali
- Language: English
- Publication date: 1997
- Publication place: America
- ISBN: 9788184759969

The Country Without a Post Office is a 1997 collection of poems written by poet Agha Shahid Ali. (Note: During an interview Ali said that all these designations would be true: "Kashmiri-American poet, Indian-American poet, South Asian-American poet, Muslim-American.") The title poem, which has become a symbol for freedom, is one of the most famous about Kashmir. In the decades since its publication, under renewed conflict and censorship in the region, it has been cited by politicians, protestors, academics and journalists. The collection brought Ali critical acclaim, universal praise and a Guggenheim Fellowship in 1996.

== Description ==
The Country Without a Post Office is Ali's third collection of poetry and, like the previous two collections, contains poems related to exile, yearning, and the loss of home and country. This is in contrast to Ali himself, who was a "self described happy man".

Some poems of the collection have epigraphs from poets such as W. B. Yeats, Emily Dickinson, Adela Florence Nicolson, Charles Simic, Zbigniew Herbert, and Gerard Manley Hopkins. Numerous parts of the book are dedicated to Ali's friends, such as the prologue, which is dedicated to childhood friend Irfan Hassan. The collection itself is dedicated to his mother and to the American poet James Merrill. In the prologue, a line by Russian poet Osip Mandelstam is used as the epigraph, invoking Kashmir itself:

Let me cry out in that void, say it as I can. I write on that void:
Kashmir, Kaschmir, Cashmere, Qashmir, Cashmir, Cashmire,
Kashmere, Cachemire, Cushmeer, Cachmiere, Cašmir. Or Cauchemar
in a sea of stories? Or: Kacmir, Kaschemir, Kasmere, Kachmire, Kasmir. Kerseymere?

For Ali, "home" largely refers to an "imaginary homeland" laden with diasporic feelings. By beginning with Mandelstam's poem, Ali tries to bring out the sheer scale of the tragedy in Kashmir by comparing it with Joseph Stalin's Russia. The collection covers themes such as exile, post-colonialism, and communication (both emotionally and in terms of self-knowledge). Ali's poetry also addresses the Kashmiri Pandit community; one of the poems in the collection is dedicated to Suvir Kaul. There is a poem titled "Hans Christian Ostro", about a Norwegian tourist who was captured by Al-Faran militants in Kashmir in 1995. Daniel Hall called this poem "the most poignant of Shahid's political poems".

In another poem of the collection, "I See Kashmir from New Delhi at Midnight", Ali tries to imagine the violence in Kashmir, going as far as to say, "Don't tell my father I have died", hinting at the disappearances in the region. This particular poem is dedicated to Molvi Abdul Hai, whose son Rizwan crossed over the border in the 1990s and was killed on the way back, dying unburied like many others. The poem "A History of Paisley", juxtaposes a story about Shiva and Parvati with the violence in Kashmir. The poem "Farewell" talks about how the Kashmiri Pandits had to flee during the violence in the 1990s. This poem is introduced with the epigraph "They make desolation and call it peace", (Note: Which Calgacus said about the Romans) by which Ali alludes that the whole population of Kashmir, both Hindu and Muslims, has become captive. However, throughout the collection, Ali is hopeful for the return of the pandits and the return of peace. He does though write in "A Pastoral" that the return is only possible when "the soldiers return the keys".

The collection also has a letter, "Dear Shahid", informing the world about a region from which no news is reported, and where violent death is common and "Everyone carries his address in his pocket so that at least his body will reach home". The usage of letters and post offices, harbingers of information, conveys Ali's search for information despite the lack of communications, even though everyone wants to share it. Through the metaphors of letter and post offices Ali also bears witness to the tragedy in the region, narrating it to the world at the same time, and further wants the peace to return.

=== Title poem ===
The title poem, "The Country Without a Post Office", was originally published under the title "Kashmir without a Post Office" in the Graham House Review. Ali revised and expanded it for this edition. The poem was penned against the backdrop of an armed uprising in Kashmir that peaked in 1990. There had been a total breakdown of state machinery, resulting in the suspension of postal services in the region for seven months. Some post offices were converted into bunkers by the army. In the poem, Shahid writes about "the land of doomed addresses", referring to letters and packages that piled up in post offices and went undelivered. He further goes on to talk about more haunting experiences during the conflict; he writes about longing and "the struggle to understand what is happening in his home and his heart". Ali also compares the misfortunes of exiled Hindus and oppressed Muslims.

The poem is written in four sections, each composed of three octaves. The first section describes the narrator returning to Kashmir, where images of minarets, astrologers, and postal inspectors are evoked. The next stanza refers to the violence in the region. Following the imagery of the first section, the second section introduces people trying but unable to talk to each other; no nation is mentioned on the postal stamps because the region is disputed. The third section has the narrator take on the role of a muezzin, but instead of calling people to prayer he calls them to buy postage stamps before he is gone. In the fourth and final section, the narrator reads letters that have been piling up. Slowly the narrator descends into madness, ending with a personal thought that he would like to live forever.

The poem was inspired by a letter Ali received from a childhood friend, Irfan Hassan. The letter described an incident in Jawahar Nagar, Srinagar, where Irfan Hassan saw heaps of letters in a post office, and found many letters addressed to himself and Ali's father, sent by Ali. Irfan sent a letter through family to Ali telling him about this. The prologue of the book was dedicated to Irfan Hassan.

== Critical reception ==
The poem brought Ali a Guggenheim Fellowship and critical praise. American writer Hayden Carruth in his review said, "Ali speaks for Kashmir in a large, generous, compassionate, powerful and urgent voice ... Few poets in this country have such a voice or such a topic". Edward Said noted that "this is poetry whose appeal is universal". John Ashbery called Shahid "one of America's finest younger poets". American writer Joseph Donahue wrote: "the poet envisions the devastation of his homeland, moving from the realm of the personal to an expansive poetry that maintains an integrity of feeling in the midst of political violence and tragedy. Kashmir is vividly evoked".

== Impact and legacy ==
The title poem has been cited by cultural and political figures in the years since its publication. The reasons for the work being cited vary. From the poem being critically and universally praised, to it becoming one of the most famous poems to be written about Kashmir, it was a poem that connected to the land and the people of the region. It became a metaphor for a free country and anchored the larger collection that talked about the pain of Kashmir in a heartfelt and intense way. Ali's masterpiece deeply connected with and in turn influenced many Kashmiri writers. Kashmiri novelist Mirza Waheed wrote, "For many of us, growing up amid this horror, it was Shahid who shone a light on the darkness... when I first read Country... it was akin to listening to someone making sense of my world to me for the first time". The title's literal meaning has also been used to describe modern-day communication restrictions in the region during times of conflict.

A 2016 cultural evening organised in Jawaharlal Nehru University (JNU) protesting the death sentences of two Kashmiri rebels convicted of 2001 Indian Parliament attack, which led to the sedition row involving Kanhaiya Kumar, was titled 'The Country Without a Post Office'. Posters with the poem's name were pasted across the JNU campus. Following the controversy, a Right to Information Act application was filed related to the poem, to which the Chief Postmaster General of Srinagar replied: "A total of 1,699 post offices function in the J-K Circle, of which 705 post offices function in Kashmir Valley". The title poem was also referred to in the Parliament of India in 2016.

In 2019, Kashmiri author Mirza Waheed referenced the title in his tweet: "Kashmir is now officially The Country Without a Post Office. I'm so very sorry, Shahid". Soon after the revocation of Article 370 in 2019 and the bifurcation of the state, a communications blackout prompted Carnatic musician T. M. Krishna to recite Shahid's poem. A report in the Boston Review stated: "Kashmir has once again turned into a country without a post office". Scroll.in and Firstpost used the title as an article heading in August 2019. In September 2019, the Pakistani newspaper The Express Tribune ran an editorial titled "Country Without a Post Office".
