= Anthony M. Bloch =

American mathematician

Anthony Bloch
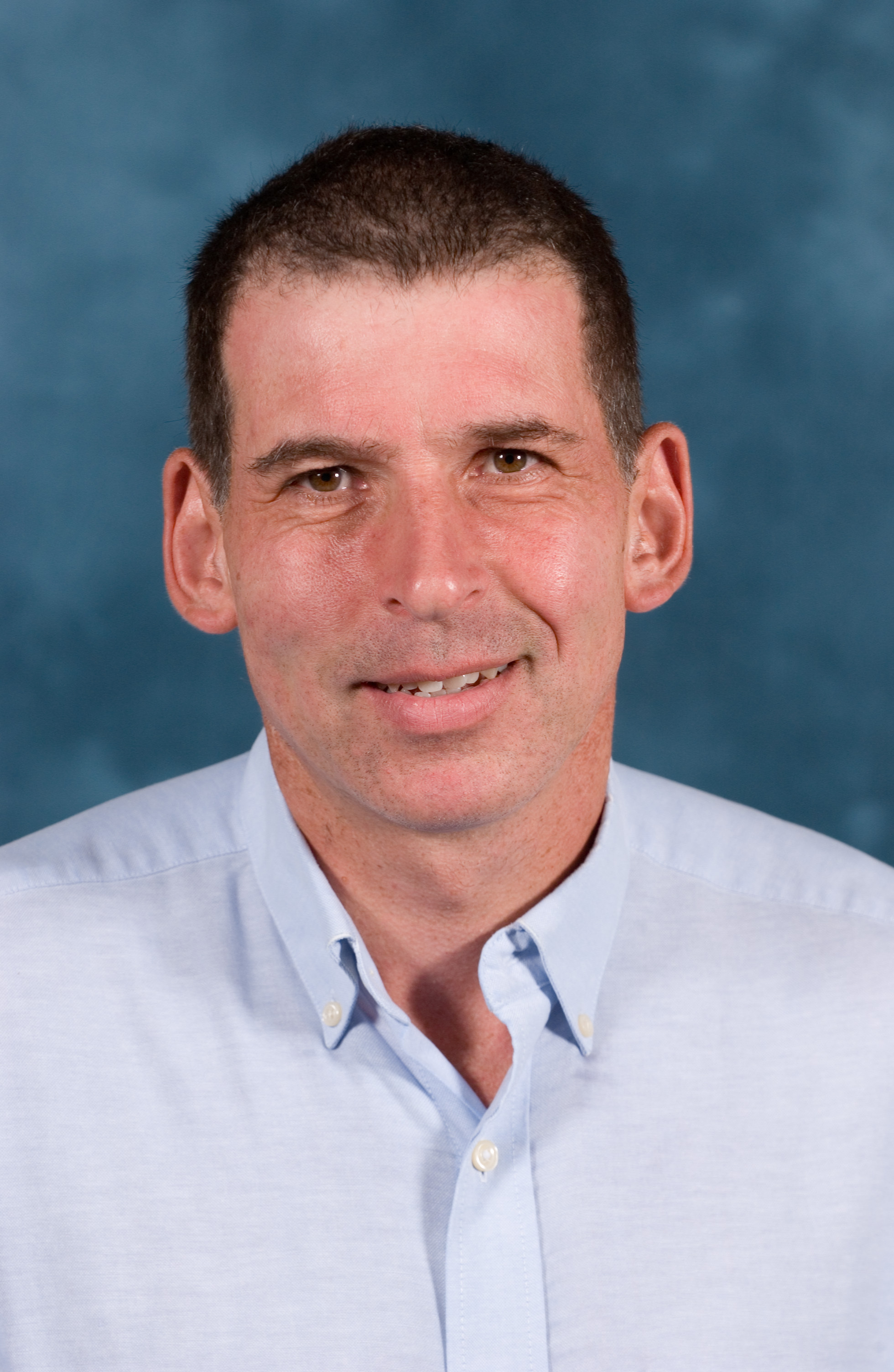
- Education: University of the Witwatersrand ( B.Sc. and B.Sc. (Hons.) , California Institute of Technology (M.S), University of Cambridge(M.Phil.), Harvard University (Ph.D.)
- Known for: Hamiltonian and Lagrangian mechanics
- Awards: W.T. and Indalia Reid prize Fellow of the Institute of Electrical and Electronics Engineers; Guggenheim fellow Fellow of the American Mathematical Society
- Scientific career
- Fields: Mathematics
- Workplaces: University of Michigan

Anthony M. Bloch is an American mathematician and the Alexander Ziwet Collegiate Professor of Mathematics at the University of Michigan.

He is known for his contributions to Hamiltonian and Lagrangian mechanics, geometric control theory, integrable systems, and nonholonomic mechanics. He has held editorial positions and served three terms as Chair of the University of Michigan Department of Mathematics.

In 2012 he was named a Fellow of Society for Industrial and Applied Mathematics and a Fellow of the American Mathematical Society.

He was named a Fellow of the Institute of Electrical and Electronics Engineers in 2003. He is also a Guggenheim fellow and Simons Fellows in Mathematics.

== Education ==
Bloch earned a B.Sc. and B.Sc. (Hons.) in Applied Mathematics and Physics from the University of the Witwatersrand in 1977 and 1978, respectively. He completed an M.S. in Physics at the California Institute of Technology in 1979 and an M.Phil. in Control Engineering and Operations Research at the University of Cambridge in 1981. In 1985, he received his Ph.D. in Applied Mathematics from Harvard University.

== Career ==
Bloch joined the University of Michigan faculty in 1985, becoming Alexander Ziwet Collegiate Professor of Mathematics in 2005. He served as Graduate Chair of the Department of Mathematics from 2001 to 2004 and as Department Chair from 2005 to 2008 and again from 2017 to 2023.

He has been a Guggenheim Fellow, Simons Fellow, Senior Fellow of the University of Michigan Society of Fellows, and is a Life Fellow of the Institute of Electrical and Electronics Engineers (IEEE).

Bloch is also a Fellow of the American Mathematical Society (AMS), the Society for Industrial and Applied Mathematics (SIAM), and of the International Core Academy of Sciences and Humanities,

Bloch has served as Editor-in-Chief of the SIAM Journal on Control and Optimization (2012–2018), Co-Editor-in-Chief of the Journal of Nonlinear Science (2018–present), and Book Series Editor for Springer's Applied Mathematical Sciences series (2018–present).

He was a member of the Institute for Advanced Study in 1997. In 2023 he was a Distinguished Visiting Professor at the Instituto de Ciencias Matemáticas (ICMAT) in Spain and delivered the 30th Annual Owens Lecture at Wayne State University. In 2026, he was awarded W.T. and Indalia Reid prize from SIAM.

== Research ==
Bloch's research spans Hamiltonian and Lagrangian mechanics, symplectic geometry, geometric control theory, gradient flows on manifolds, integrable systems, stability theory, nonholonomic mechanics, quantum control and astrophysics.

He has worked extensively on the geometric formulation and control of nonholonomic systems, with influential papers on symmetry reduction and stabilization, and is one of the original developers of the method of controlled Lagrangians.

His research in control theory includes widely cited results with M. Reyhanoglu and N. H. McClamroch on the control of nonholonomic mechanical systems.

In integrable systems, Bloch is well known for showing that the Toda lattice flow is gradient on adjoint orbit and for his work with Roger Brockett and Tudor Rațiu generalizing this to general Lie algebras as well for his related work on gradient and double bracket flows.

He also known for work on the symmetric representation of the generalized rigid body equations with Crouch, Marsden, and Rațiu and his work with Iserles, Marsden, and Rațiu on integrable flows on symmetric matrices.

Bloch is the author of Nonholonomic Mechanics and Control (now in its second edition), which has been cited over 2,000 times and is regarded as a standard reference in the field. His most recent book, co-authored with A. Rojo, is The Principle of Least Action: History and Physics, which examines the development and applications of variational principles in mechanics.

His recent work also involves data-guided control, network dynamics, and applications to biological systems. He maintains active collaborations across mathematics, physics, engineering, and applied sciences.

== Selected publications ==
- Bloch, A. M.; Marsden, J. E. (1989). "Controlling homoclinic orbits". Theoretical and Computational Fluid Dynamics. 1 (3): 179–190. Bibcode:1989ThCFD...1..179B. doi:10.1007/bf00417919. ISSN 0935-4964.
- Bloch, A. M. (1990). "Steepest descent, linear programming, and Hamiltonian flows". Contemporary Mathematics. 114: 77–88. doi:10.1090/conm/114/1097866. ISBN 978-0-8218-5121-0. ISSN 1098-3627.
- Bloch, A. M.; Flaschka, H.; Rațiu, T. (1990-08-01). "A convexity theorem for isospectral manifolds of Jacobi matrices in a compact Lie algebra". Duke Mathematical Journal. 61 (1). doi:10.1215/s0012-7094-90-06103-4. ISSN 0012-7094.
- Bloch, Anthony M.; Brockett, Roger W.; Rațiu, Tudor S. (1992). "Completely integrable gradient flows". Communications in Mathematical Physics. 147 (1): 57–74. Bibcode:1992CMaPh.147...57B. doi:10.1007/bf02099528. ISSN 0010-3616.
- Bloch, A. M.; Flaschka, H.; Rațiu, T. (1993). "A Schur-Horn-Kostant convexity theorem for the diffeomorphism group of the annulus". Inventiones Mathematicae. 113 (1): 511–529. Bibcode:1993InMat.113..511B. doi:10.1007/bf01244316. ISSN 0020-9910.
- Bloch, Anthony M.; Krishnaprasad, P. S.; Marsden, Jerrold E.; Murray, Richard M. (1996). "Nonholonomic mechanical systems with symmetry". Archive for Rational Mechanics and Analysis. 136 (1): 21–99. Bibcode:1996ArRMA.136...21B. doi:10.1007/bf02199365. hdl:2027.42/41921. ISSN 0003-9527.
- Bloch, A.M.; Leonard, N.E.; Marsden, J.E. (2000). "Controlled Lagrangians and the stabilization of mechanical systems. I. The first matching theorem". IEEE Transactions on Automatic Control. 45 (12): 2253–2270. Bibcode:2000ITAC...45.2253B. doi:10.1109/9.895562. ISSN 0018-9286.
- Bloch, Anthony M.; Marsden, Jerrold E.; Zenkov, Dmitry V. (2009-04-27). "Quasivelocities and symmetries in non-holonomic systems". Dynamical Systems. 24 (2): 187–222. doi:10.1080/14689360802609344. ISSN 1468-9367.
- Clark, William; Bloch, Anthony (2022-01-25), "Invariant Forms in Hybrid and Impact Systems and a Taming of Zeno", Archive for Rational Mechanics and Analysis, 247 (2): 13, arXiv:2101.11128, Bibcode:2023ArRMA.247...13C, doi:10.1007/s00205-023-01844-1
- Bloch, Anthony M.; Karp, Steven N. (2021-11-22), "Gradient Flows, Adjoint Orbits, and the Topology of Totally Nonnegative Flag Varieties", Communications in Mathematical Physics, 398 (3): 1213–1289, arXiv:2109.04558, doi:10.1007/s00220-022-04540-5
- Bloch, Anthony M.; Karp, Steven N. (2022-10-10), "On two notions of total positivity for partial flag varieties", Advances in Mathematics, 414 108855, arXiv:2206.05806, doi:10.1016/j.aim.2022.108855
- Bloch, Anthony M.; Karp, Steven N. (2023). "Symmetric Toda, gradient flows, and tridiagonalization". Physica D: Nonlinear Phenomena. 450 133766. arXiv:2304.10697. Bibcode:2023PhyD..45033766B. doi:10.1016/j.physd.2023.133766.
- Pickard, Joshua; Chen, Can; Stansbury, Cooper; Surana, Amit; Bloch, Anthony; Rajapakse, Indika (2024-04-10), Kronecker Product of Tensors and Hypergraphs: Structure and Dynamics, arXiv:2305.03875
