= Anne Fontaine Foundation =

U.S. nonprofit organization

The Anne Fontaine Foundation is a 501(c)(3) nonprofit organization created in 2011 by the Franco-Brazilian fashion designer Anne Fontaine. Based in New York City, it "aims to encourage reforestation and to concentrate its financial resources specifically on the protection of the Atlantic Rainforest in Brazil".

== Founder ==
Anne Fontaine was born and raised in Rio de Janeiro. She moved to France when she was 18, where she designed her first collection of white shirts for women in 1993. She founded her brand Anne Fontaine with her husband Ari Zlotkin, and opened her first store in Paris in 1994. The company now has storefronts in several countries. Her personal experience of living with the Canela tribe in the Amazon rainforest inspired her commitment to the conservation of the environment conservation of the environment. In 2011, Fontaine created her own foundation in New York for the protection of rainforests.

== Mission ==
The Anne Fontaine Foundation is dedicated to raising environmental awareness and to encouraging reforestation activities, mostly located in the Brazilian Atlantic Forest (Mata Atlântica). To do so, the Anne Fontaine Foundation supports reforestation programs implemented in Brazil by local non-governmental organizations (NGOs), and to which local communities are associated.

In order to raise funds and environmental awareness, the Anne Fontaine Foundation organizes artistic events and invites artists inspired by nature themes to collaborate. The foundation is promoting also environmental awareness through workshops and artistic contests organized in local communities and schools. In 2013, 2014 and 2016, the Foundation held three photographs exhibitions at Sotheby's, entitled Trees in Focus, two at Sotheby's New York (2013 and 2016) and one at Sotheby's Paris.

== Projects and partnerships ==
The Foundation has established long-term partnerships with three local NGOs in Brazil that are committed to implement reforestation programs. The Instituto Floresta Viva, the Instituto Terra and the APNE are based in Bahia, Minas Gerais and the state of Pernambuco, in regions highly threatened by deforestation. The Foundation has supported the plantation of 40,000 seedlings so far.

== Educative initiatives ==
The Anne Fontaine Foundation aims at educating children about the importance of the rainforest and the ways to protect it. Each year the foundation organizes art contests "Naturart", in Brazilian schools from kindergarten to 8th grade. In the poorest communities of Rio de Janeiro, the Anne Fontaine Foundation partners with the Planeta Ginga Festival and the Rio Botanical Garden in order to organize a workshop "Mata Atlantica". During two days, children have the opportunity to learn more about the Mata Atlantica, and to plant seedlings on the slopes of the favela.

== Artistic initiatives and fundraising ==
=== Trees in Focus ===
Since 2013, the Anne Fontaine Foundation has organized a charity auction of tree photographs, Trees in Focus, to the benefit of the Foundation. The 2016 edition featured photographers like Sebastião Salgado, Michael Kenna, Sarah Moon, Antoine Verglas, Claudia Jaguaribe, Pamela Hanson, André Rau and many others, that have been supporting the foundation since the first edition. Among the photographers who joined the 2016 edition are Andrew Moore, Beth Moon from the US, Vincent Rosenblatt, Julia Kater, Valdir Cruz, Oskar Metsavaht, from Brazil and Christophe d’Yvoire from France.

=== The Forest Day ===
Every year, Anne Fontaine dedicates one day to the protection of the forests. That day, 50% of the sales in the Anne Fontaine stores worldwide are donated to the Anne Fontaine Foundation.
