= Begum Zaffar Ali =

Educationist, Women activist

- Born: 1901; Srinagar, Kashmir and Jammu, British India
- Died: 1999 (aged 97–98); United States
- Occupations: Educationist, Women's liberation activist
- Known for: Women's liberation, first woman matriculate of Kashmir
- Spouse: Agha Zaffar Ali Qizilbash
- Children: Agha Nasir Ali, Agha Shaukat Ali, Agha Ashraf Ali
- Parent: Khan Bahadur Aga Syed Hussain Thakur
- Relatives: Agha Shahid Ali (grandson), Syed Ahmed Aga (Brother)
- Awards: Padma Shri

Begum Zaffar Ali, née Sahibzaadi Syeda Fatima, was an Indian women's rights activist and the first woman matriculate of the Indian state of Kashmir and Jammu who went on to become Inspector of Schools in Kashmir. She was an educationist, women's liberation activist, deputy director of education and later a legislator in the Indian state of Jammu and Kashmir. She was associated with the activities of the All India Women's Conference and was its secretary before partition, but a chance meeting with Muhammad Ali Jinnah and his sister, Fatima Jinnah in Kashmir, who would later visit the family for banquets, influenced her and she left the conference to concentrate her efforts in women's liberation movements in the pre-independent India.

== Biography ==
Begum Ali was born in 1901 to Khan Bahadur Aga Syed Hussain Thakur, Home and Judicial Minister during Maharaja Hari Singh's rule. She began her career as a teacher in 1925 at the Girls' Mission High School (present day Mallinson Girls School). A staunch believer in women's rights, she went door to door to raise awareness regarding girls' education in the Valley and persevered to empower them through education. Her speeches at Public events inspired adulation among the women who started sending their girls to schools. Begum was married to Agha Zaffar Ali Qizilbash, a scion of an aristocratic Afghan family settled in the Kashmir region of India. The couple had three sons, Agha Nasir Ali-IAS, a civil servant who retired as Labour Secretary of India in 1977, Agha Shaukat Ali, who joined civil services of Pakistan during the partition of India in 1947. Begum's youngest son is Agha Ashraf Ali, an academic who retired as Commissioner of Higher Education in Jammu and Kashmir The Veiled Suite: The Collected Poem, an anthology written by her grandson Agha Shahid Ali, a noted Kashmiri-American poet, features a poem in memory of her. The Government of India awarded her the fourth highest civilian honour of Padma Shri in 1987. Later in a Doordarshan interview, she announced to return the award in protest against the undemocratic policies of the Government. She moved to the United States in the 1990s and lived there with her son Agha Shaukat Ali until her death in 1999.

== See also ==
- Kashmiri people
