= Agha Shaukat Ali =

Pakistani civil servant

Agha Shaukat Ali ﺁغا شوكت على قزلباش

Personal details
- Born: 1919 Srinagar, Kashmir
- Died: 19 March 2013 (aged 93–94) U.S.
- Spouse: Mussarat Nizamuddin Agha
- Children: Agha Azhar Ali, Agha Shehryar Ali, Tehmina Khan, Rabia Ali
- Parents: Agha Zaffar Ali Qizilbash (father); Begum Zaffar Ali (mother)
- Education: Sri Pratap College, Aligarh Muslim University, Princeton University

Agha Shaukat Ali (1919 – 19 March 2013) was a civil servant-turned-politician in the princely state of Jammu and Kashmir, British Indian Empire. He served as the General Secretary of the Muslim Conference party in the years preceding the Partition of India. Having migrated to Pakistan after the partition, he served as a civil servant, and diplomat.

== Family background ==
Agha Shaukat Ali was born in the aristocratic Zaffar Afghan Agha Qızılbash family with Turkic origins in Srinagar in 1919. The family belonged to the military Qizilbash aristocracy which had migrated from Kandahar, Afghanistan in the early 19th century and since then held offices of royal physicians, ministers and courtiers to the Dogra dynasty.

His mother, Begum Zaffar Ali, an educationist and legislator, was the first woman matriculate of Kashmir. His maternal grandfather, Khan Bahadur Aga Syed Hussain, then Governor and later Home and Judicial Minister in the princely state, was the first matriculate of Kashmir.

Shaukat Ali's eldest brother was Agha Nasir Ali, a civil servant and his youngest brother Agha Ashraf Ali. His brother Agha Nasir Ali was the first Kashmiri to enter the civil services through competition and was already serving as Wazir-e-Wazarat.

== Early life and education ==
Shaukat Ali was educated at the Mission School at Fateh Kadal (later renamed as Tyndale Biscoe School) in Srinagar. He passed his matriculation in 1936. He graduated in Arts from Sri Pratap College. He attended the Aligarh University in 1930s with an LLB degree.

He later married Mussarat Nizamuddin of the Mian family of Baghbanpura, custodians of the Shalimar Gardens, Lahore. The newlyweds lived in Kashmir where Shaukat Ali joined the Kashmir Civil Services. He served as the tehsildar in Akhnoor.

== Political career in British India ==
During the end of British colonial rule in India, Shaukat Ali joined the All Jammu and Kashmir Muslim Conference as its general secretary, after resigning from the civil services as a Tehsildar in 1946, at the request of Muhammad Ali Jinnah, the founder of Pakistan. Agha Shaukat Ali played an important role in the changing politics of Kashmir from 1946 to 1948.

He became the General Secretary of Muslim Conference and was instrumental in promoting the policies of Jinnah in Kashmir. Most notably, Shaukat Ali held a public gathering in defiance of prevailing prohibitions at that time, and was imprisoned along with Chaudhry Ghulam Abbas on the orders of the then Prime Minister Ram Chandra Kak, for political reasons from 1947 to 1948.

When Pakistan was founded in 1947, Agha Shaukat's release from prison was brokered by the United Nations. He was released as a part of an exchange of political prisoners between India and Pakistan. He was exchanged for Brigadier Ghansara Singh (Governor of Gilgit) who had been arrested by the Muslim forces of Pakistan in Gilgit. Leaving his mother and brothers in Kashmir, Shaukat Ali moved to Pakistan with his wife.

== Civil service in Pakistan ==
After Jinnah's death, Shaukat Ali was expelled from the Muslim Conference. He later received assignments in the Central Services of Pakistan. In that capacity he also served as the Information Secretary to President Ayub Khan.

Shaukat Ali attended the Woodrow Wilson School of Public and International Affairs at Princeton University as a Fulbright Scholar. He enjoyed his time in the United States in the 1950s and returned to his alma mater on many occasions. He also received diplomatic assignments in various missions, including one in London.

== Later years ==
=== Author ===
He authored the book The Modernization of Soviet Central Asia and was invited by the government of China to share his assessment of the implications of lifting the Red Curtain in 1979.

=== Iqbal-Shariati Foundation ===
He founded the Iqbal-Shariati Foundation in Lahore which funded the translation and publication of the works of Muhammad Iqbal and Ali Shariati, two poet-philosophers whom he admired.

=== Kashmir issue ===
He loved Kashmir, his homeland. It is said that he provided suggestions to Pakistan President Pervez Musharraf on the Kashmir issue.

=== Death ===
Agha Shaukat Ali died on Tuesday, 19 March 2013, in Vienna, Virginia in the United States. His wife Mussarat Nizamuddin died in the 1990s. His son Agha Shehryar had died earlier. He was survived by three other children: son Agha Azhar Ali and two daughters Tehmina Khan and Rabia Ali. They reside in the United States.

== Works ==
- Modernization of Soviet Central Asia, 1964.
- The New Wave: A Muslim Reply to the New World Order, 1992.

== Bibliography ==
- Hussain, Sheikh Showkat (2017), Kashmir Profiles, Dar Al Kotob Al Ilmiyah, ISBN 978-2-7451-2195-0
