= Rosemary Lévy Zumwalt =

American folklorist and historian of anthropology (born 1944)

Rosemary Lévy Zumwalt (born December 12, 1944) is an American folklorist, anthropologist, and historian.

She took her bachelor's degree in anthropology at the University of California, Santa Cruz in 1972, followed by a master's degree in folklore at the University of California, Berkeley in 1978. She earned her PhD at Berkeley in 1982, defending the thesis American Folkloristics: The Literary and Anthropological Roots.

Shortly after her PhD, in 1983, Zumwalt became employed at Davidson College. She held the titles of associate professor from 1988, professor from 1995 and Paul B. Freeland Professor of Anthropology from 1998 to 2001. She chaired the Department of Anthropology and Sociology at Davidson College 1992–1996. Zumwalt left Davidson to become Vice President of Academic Affairs and Dean at Agnes Scott College from 2001 to 2010.

Zumwalt was elected as a fellow of the American Folklore Society in 1996, serving as president from 1999 to 2001.

Among her monographs are Wealth and Rebellion: Elsie Clews Parsons, Anthropologist and Folklorist from 1992. Among her co-edited volumes are Ritual Medical Lore of Sephardic Women: Sweetening the Spirits and Healing the Sick with Isaac Jack Lévy in 2002. Her 2008 monograph Franz Boas and W.E.B. Du Bois at Atlanta University, 1906 was awarded the American Philosophical Society's John Frederick Lewis Award. Her two-volume biography of Franz Boas, consisting of The Emergence of the Anthropologist (2019) and Shaping Anthropology and Fostering Social Justice (2022), was extensively reviewed.
