= Cristina Magaldi =

Brazilian musicologist (born 1958)

- Occupation: Musicologist
- Awards: Guggenheim Fellowship (1996)

Academic background
- Education: University of Brasília; University of Reading; University of California, Los Angeles
- Thesis: Concert life in Rio de Janeiro, 1837-1900 [3] (1994)

Academic work
- Discipline: Musicology
- Sub-discipline: Latin American music
- Institutions: Federal University of Alagoas; Towson University

Cristina Magaldi is a Brazilian musicologist specializing in Latin American music. A 1996 Guggenheim Fellow, she is author of Music in Imperial Rio de Janeiro (2004) and Music and Cosmopolitanism (2024). She is professor emeritus at Towson University.

== Biography ==
Cristina Magaldi is a Towson University Professor Emerita. She holds a bachelor's degree from the University of Brasília, Brazil, a Master of Music from the University of Reading in England, and a Ph.D. from the University of California, Los Angeles. Magaldi’s areas of study include music in Latin America, Brazilian music, music and globalization, music and nationalism, popular music, and music and gender. At Towson University she taught courses in Latin American music, music in the United States, Honors seminars in music and gender, popular music, and Brazilian music, and general education courses in world musics.

Magaldi specializes in Latin American music. In 1996, she was awarded a Guggenheim Fellowship for "a study of comic theatrical music genres in Rio de Janeiro, 1870-1900". She has served as a contributing editor for the Handbook of Latin American Studies. She won the 2005 Robert M. Stevenson Award for her book Music in Imperial Rio de Janeiro. She won the 2009 Irving Lowens Article Award for her The Musical Quarterly article on cosmopolitanism and music in Rio de Janeiro. In 2024, her next book Music and Cosmopolitanism was published by Oxford University Press.

== Bibliography ==
- Music in Imperial Rio de Janeiro (2004)
- Music and Cosmopolitanism (2024)
