= Anne Fontaine (brand) =

French clothing business

- Type: Private
- Industry: Retail
- Founded: 1993
- Headquarters: Corporate: Avenue du Canada 14600 Honfleur, France
- Key people: Anne Fontaine, Ari Zlotkin
- Products: Apparel
- Website: www.annefontaine.com

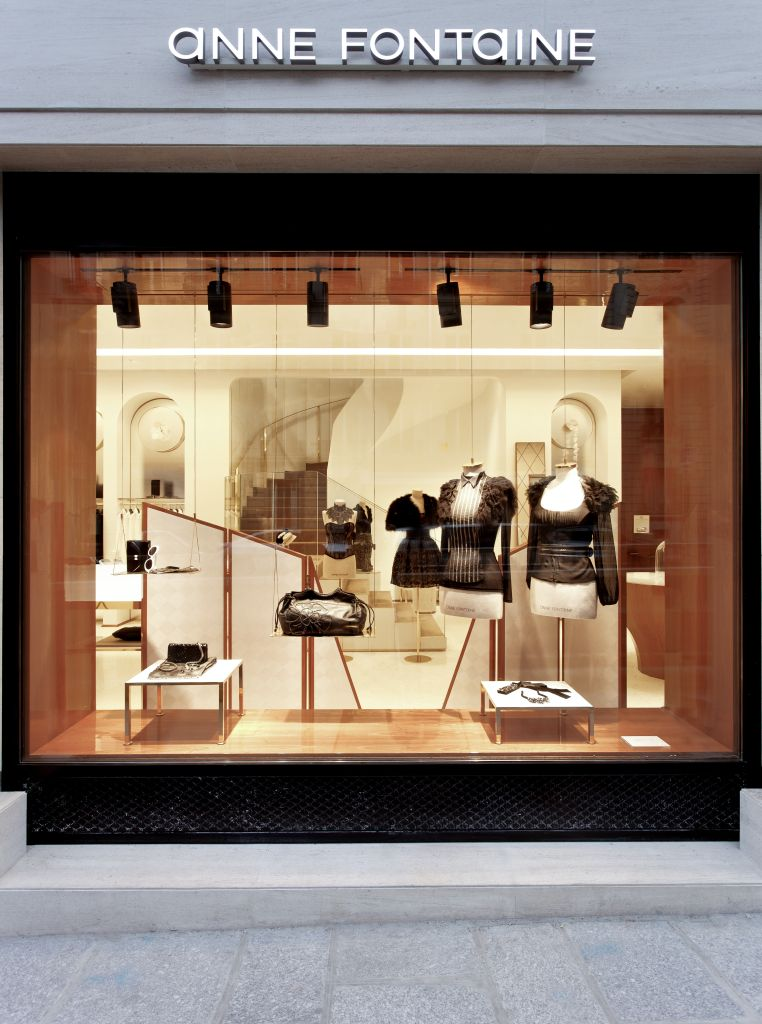
An Anne Fontaine flagship store in Paris, France

Anne Fontaine is a women's fashion brand. The company is based in France, and its products include clothing, shoes, handbags and accessories.

== History ==
Anne Fontaine opened their first boutique in the Rive Gauche section of Paris in 1994. Since the opening of the original store, Anne Fontaine has expanded to 85 boutiques worldwide including Paris, Tokyo and New York City.

As of the end of 2018, the company operated eight retail locations.

== Recognition ==
Fontaine has been the recipient of several awards, including the French National Order of Merit (French: Ordre national du Mérite) and received the award of l'élan de Mode in 2006 (French Federation of Fashion)

In 2011, Fontaine created the New York-based Anne Fontaine Foundation to support the protection of endangered forests and promote reforestation. The Foundation's projects are focused on the Brazilian Atlantic forest, also known as the Mata Atlântica.
