= Ullrich Langer =

American literary and intellectual historian (born 1954)

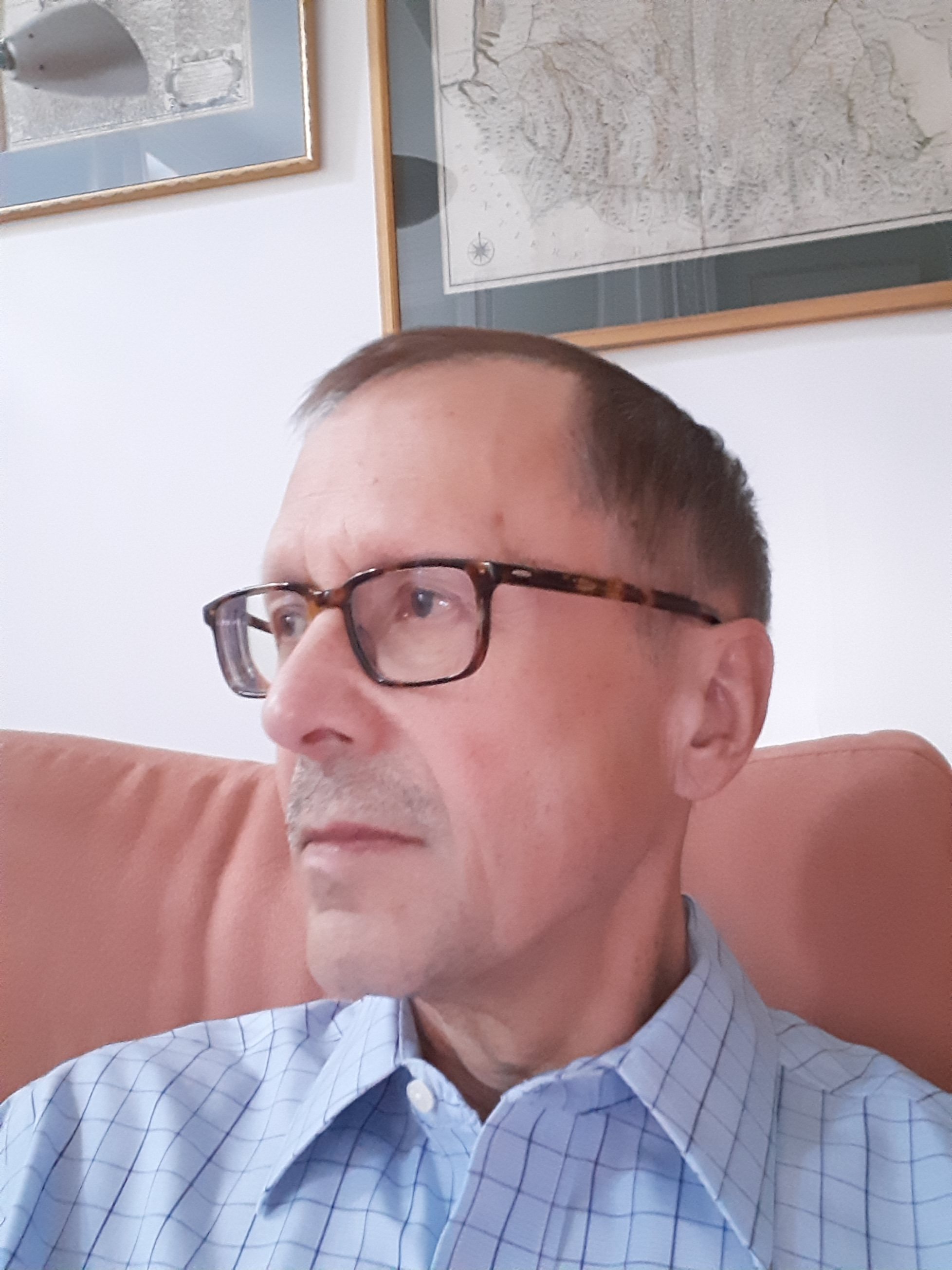
- Born: March 10, 1954 (age 72)
- Occupations: Renaissance literary and intellectual historian and academic

Academic background
- Education: B.A. in Philosophy; M.A. in French Literature; PhD in Romance Languages and Literature
- Alma mater: University of Washington; Princeton University
- Thesis: Rhétorique et intersubjectivité: Les Tragiques d’Agrippa d’Aubigné (1980)

Academic work
- Institutions: Bryn Mawr College; University of Wisconsin-Madison

Ullrich Langer is an American Renaissance literary and intellectual historian and academic. He is a Vilas Distinguished Achievement Professor in the Department of French and Italian at the College of Letters and Science of the University of Wisconsin-Madison.

Langer is most known for his contributions to French literature and has worked particularly on Renaissance intellectual history and 16th-century poetry and prose. He has authored and edited numerous books and volumes, including Lyric in the Renaissance: From Petrarch to Montaigne, Lyric Humanity from Virgil to Flaubert, Divine and Poetic Freedom in the Renaissance and The Cambridge Companion to Montaigne.

== Education ==
In 1973, Langer graduated from the University of Washington with a B.A. in Philosophy, and subsequently obtained a M.A. in French Literature from the same university in 1975. Following studies in French Literature at Universität Tübingen in 1976, he proceeded to conduct his doctoral research at Université de Montpellier and attained a Ph.D. in Romance Languages and Literature from Princeton University in 1980.

== Career ==
Following his Ph.D., Langer began his academic career as assistant professor of French at Bryn Mawr College in 1980 and went on to hold an appointment as an assistant professor at the University of Wisconsin in 1985 where he was promoted to associate professor of French in 1988. Since 2017, he has been serving as Vilas Distinguished Achievement Professor in the Department of French and Italian at the University of Wisconsin-Madison and became Emeritus Professor in 2020.

Langer served as a Director of the Center for Early Modern Studies, an Interim Director of the Institute for Research in the Humanities, and Chair of the Department of French and Italian at the University of Wisconsin in Madison.

== Work ==
With a particular interest in moral philosophy and political theory, Langer has explored the realm of French literature, with a specific focus on 16th-century poetry and prose, as well as Renaissance intellectual history, political thought, and moral philosophy.

=== Freedom, creativity, and theology in Renaissance literature ===
Langer's literary exploration has focused on the connection between freedom, creativity, and theology in Renaissance literature, while also analyzing the power of lyric representation in addressing ethical and aesthetic questions from a humanist perspective. He argued that French and Italian Renaissance literature could be understood in light of late medieval scholasticism, particularly nominalist theology. He discussed issues such as the new status of the poet and the reader, in comparison to medieval antecedents, and through concepts of causality, necessity, freedom and merit. In the book, Divine and Poetic Freedom in the Renaissance he explored the connection between creativity, freedom, and nominalist theology. In his perspective, nominalist theology offered a collection of concepts that aided in comprehending the intellectual context of freedom. God, the secular sovereign, and the poet were all relieved of external necessity in their relationships with their respective worlds. He highlighted the "modern" aspects of fifteenth and sixteenth-century literature by examining contemporary notions of freedom.

=== Impact of lyrical representation ===
Langer has also studied the impact of lyric representation in addressing ethical and aesthetic concerns in a humanist framework. His work titled Lyric in the Renaissance: From Petrarch to Montaigne, made a distinction between the concept of lyric poetry in classical and early modern times and its evolved meaning since the eighteenth century. He presented new interpretations of several French poets, such as Charles d'Orleans, Ronsard, and Du Bellay, and reevaluated Montaigne's perspective on the poetry of that era and its relationship to his own prose. Moreover, he addressed the inadequacy of the traditional rhetorical commentary in fully capturing the singular effect of lyric poetry, particularly as exemplified in Petrarch's Rime Sparse and the works of other renowned poets who followed him. Using the concept of kinesic intelligence, he also analyzed the movement of turning toward the beloved in the works of Virgil, Petrarch, and Scève, featuring its importance in Renaissance love lyric. In 2023, he published a book Lyric Humanity from Virgil to Flaubert which emphasized the power of lyric representation to elucidate elements of what makes us human by analyzing a range of texts from Virgil's Georgics to Flaubert's Éducation sentimentale and Un Coeur simple, and contemporary novelists Jean Rouaud and Jean Echenoz. He analyzed how poetry and prose have the ability to engage our empathy, sense of fairness, irony, and reasoning. Additionally, these literary works contribute to understanding pleasure and the concept of death.

=== Renaissance moral and political thought, and literature ===
Langer's research also focused on the relationship between intellectual history and literature in the early modern period, specifically examining concepts of justice and moderation. In the essay, "The Renaissance Novella as Justice" he examined how short narratives in the Renaissance reflect different models of justice within the Aristotelian-Ciceronian tradition. In related work, he examined the concept of equity and how it informs the ethical nature of short narrative.

Langer has worked on the connections between moral philosophy, political thought and literature, as well. His book, "Perfect Friendship: Studies in Literature and Moral Philosophy from Boccaccio to Corneille" defines friendship, pleasurable, useful, and virtuous, in the moral tradition and identifies various representations of friendship in early modern literature. Montaigne's chapter on friendship in the Essais poses his relationship to La Boétie in sublime terms that defy the traditional categories. Additionally, his research explored the challenge Rabelais's narrative of Pantagruel and Panurge's relationship poses to classical and early-modern accounts of friendship and love for the other, since it appears essentially unmotivated. He also connected humanist rhetoric, the theory of virtues, and the mimetic nature of literature within the context of French literary culture during the threshold of modernity in his book, Vertu du discours, discours de la vertu: littérature et philosophie morale au XVIe siècle en France. In a subsequent book, Penser les formes du plaisir littéraire à la Renaissance, he studied the models of pleasure that inform literary worlds. In more recent publications, he considers political writing surrounding the wars of religion in the 16th century in France, by highlighting the ways in which the actors attempt to maintain social bonds while voicing disagreement.

== Awards and honors ==
- 1987 – Fellowship, American Council of Learned Societies
- 1992 – Teachers Fellowship, National Endowment for the Humanities
- 1995 – Summer Seminar Director, National Endowment for the Humanities
- 1996 – Fellowship, John Simon Guggenheim Foundation

== Bibliography ==
=== Selected books ===
- Invention, Death, and Self-Definitions in the Poetry of Pierre de Ronsard (1986) ISBN 978-0-915838-61-5
- Divine and Poetic Freedom in the Renaissance: Nominalist Theology and Literature in France and Italy (1990) ISBN 978-0-691-63215-5
- Perfect Friendship: Studies in Literature and Moral Philosophy from Boccaccio to Corneille (1994) ISBN 978-2-600-00038-3
- Vertu du discours, discours de la vertu: littérature et philosophie morale au XVIe siècle en France (1999) ISBN 978-2-600-00320-9
- Penser les formes du plaisir littéraire à la Renaissance (2009) ISBN 978-2-8124-0081-0
- Lyric in the Renaissance: From Petrarch to Montaigne (2015) ISBN 978-1-107-11028-1
- Lyric Humanity from Virgil to Flaubert (2023) ISBN 978-1-009-22525-0

=== Edited volumes ===
- With Philippe Desan, Reason, Reasoning, and Literature in the Renaissance (1992)
- With François Cornilliat, Douglas Kelly, What Is Literature: France, 1100–1600 (1993) ISBN 978-0-917058-84-4
- With Jan Miernowski, Anteros (1994) ISBN 978-2-86878-120-8
- Au-delà de la "Poétique" : Aristote et la littérature de la Renaissance: Beyond the "Poetics" : Aristotle and Early Modern Literature (2002) ISBN 978-2-600-00698-9
- The Cambridge Companion to Montaigne (2005) ISBN 978-0-521-52556-5
- With Paul-Alexis Mellet, Les Remontrances (Europe: XVIe–XVIIIe siècle): Textes et commentaires (2021) ISBN 978-2-406-11228-0

=== Selected articles and essays ===
- Langer, U. (2002). Montaigne's Ethics in Context: Fortitude (I, 12) and Justice (I, 23). Montaigne Studies, 14, 7–19.
- Langer, U. (2006). De la douceur de mourir au ravissement poétique. Montaigne Studies, (18), 37–48.
- Langer, U. (2009). Plaisir littéraire et rhétorique: de la varietas au plaisir «parfait». Cahiers de l'AIEF, 61(1), 217–232.
- Langer, U. (2011). Pantagruel and Gargantua: The Political Education of the King. Ed. John O’Brien, The Cambridge Companion to Rabelais, 107–124.
- Langer, U. (2014). «Fleur mille fleurs ravissant»-Le déterminé et l’indéterminé dans la poésie amoureuse (Ronsard et Pétrarque). in Illustrations inconscientes : écritures de la Renaissance. Mélanges offerts à Tom Conley, eds. Bernd Renner, Philip Usher (Paris : Garnier), 329–342.
- Langer, U. (2016). Should We Practice Justice Toward Nonhuman Animals? Radical Animal Interests, Humanism, and Classical Justice. in ed. Jan Miernowski, Early Modern Humanism and Postmodern Antihumanism in Dialogue (Cham, CH: Palgrave-MacMillan), 49–70.
  - Langer, U. (2018). De l’équité douce à la loi âpre-De la nouvelle aux histoires tragiques. in ed. Jean-Claude Arnould, Les histoires tragiques du XVIe siècle: Pierre Boaistuau et ses émules (Paris: Garnier), 191–207.
- Langer, U. (2021). Montaigne, Skepticism and Finitude-Montaigne, Horkheimer: Unhelpful Skepticism in a Limited World. in eds. Jean Balsamo, Amy Graves, Global Montaigne: Mélanges en l’honneur de Philippe Desan (Paris: Garnier), 315–326.
- Langer, U. (2021). Pleasure and the ‘rustic life’. In eds. Cassie M. Miura, Cora Fox, Bradley J. Irish, Positive emotions in early modern literature and culture (pp. 74–88). Manchester University Press.
- Langer, U. (2023). Logique et illogisme chez Ronsard : trois exemples du Second livre des Amours, L’Année ronsardienne, 5, 13–25.
