= Jeffery Paine =

American academic

Jeffery Paine is a writer recognized for his work in bringing Eastern culture and spirituality to popular audiences in the West. "Jeffery Paine is an unusual voice in American letters," observed Indian novelist and Underscretary General of the United Nations Shashi Tharoor, "one steeped in the wisdom of the East and yet infused with a knowing and witty sensibility that is profoundly Western." Paine's books, such as Father India and Re-enchantment, have been named by publications ranging from Publishers Weekly to Spirituality & Health as "Best Book of the Year." His writing falls in the category of creative or literary nonfiction, which unites original scholarship with the dramatic narrative and character development associated with a novel.

== Biographical ==
Paine was born midcentury in Houston and grew up in Goose Creek and Baytown, Texas. He studied history at Rice University and received his PhD in crosscultural intellectual history from Princeton University. When he began writing he supported himself by managing hotels in America and Europe, including the oldest hotel in Amsterdam, and afterwards by working in advertising and public relations. He was later the editor-in-chief of Universal Reference Publishers and literary editor of the magazine the Wilson Quarterly.

He has received fellowships from the Woodrow Wilson Foundation, the American Institute of Indian Studies, and from the Templeton Foundation to study Tibetan medicine at Cambridge University. During the 1990s he was regularly a visiting fellow at the East–West Center in Honolulu and subsequently had residencies at Yaddo, the MacDowell Colony, and the Rockefeller Foundation Bellagio Center. Paine has been a guest professor at Princeton University, San Francisco State University, the New School for Social Research, the Volksuniversiteit Amsterdam, and the University of Minnesota.

== Major works ==
In Father India (1998) Paine revealed the 20th Century Euro-American encounter with India through a different lens, in a new light. Through a series of dramatic biographies, extending from Lord Curzon and Gandhi through E. M. Forster and V. S. Naipaul, Paine showed that our everyday assumptions, what unquestioningly we take for granted about politics, religion, and psychology, often have entirely unexpected outcomes when they get immersed in a radically different culture. In the San Francisco Chronicle, the novelist Bharati Mukerjee called the work "groundbreaking" in how it gave a whole new understanding of modern India vis-à-vis the West.

In Re-enchantment: Tibetan Buddhism Comes to the West' (2004) Paine traced the historical story of how a religion, once dismissed as black magic and seemingly doomed after the Chinese conquest of Tibet, against all odds resurrected itself as a world religion and renovated itself along the cutting edge of spirituality. Harvey Cox of Harvard University and author of The Secular City, said, "This is just the book on Buddhism I had hoped someone would write but was afraid they never would." Scholars such as Robert Thurman and Huston Smith appraised it as the best book written on the subject.

Paine followed Re-enchantment with Adventures with the Buddha (2005), which elucidated Buddhism not through teachings or theology but by how it got lived out on a day-to-day basis by Western practitioners from the early Alexandra David-Néel and Lama Govinda to the contemporary Sharon Salzberg and Michael Roach. Publishers Weekly called it a work of "genius, one that delights, informs, and fires the imagination."

Most recently, Paine published Enlightenment Town: Finding Spiritual Awakening in a Most Implausible Place, a project spanning 19 years. The book focuses on Crestone, Colorado, a small town that is home to 25 different religious traditions representing different global faiths. Paine examines how these diverse groups coexist in a single community, offering a perspective on religious pluralism.

The publication received praised from literary figures. Bestselling author Howard Norman described Paine as “our most creative journalist-scholar of religion.” Novelist Kate Wheeler added, “You won’t be able to resist…Jeffery Paine’s sly proposal that spiritual life can be both gentler and quite a bit wilder.”

Paine's other works include the anthology he edited with Nobel Prize-winner Joseph Brodsky, The Poetry of Our World (2000), and in 2009 he was the writer of Huston Smith's memoirs Tales of Wonder.

== Other writing, other media ==
In addition to his books, Paine has written for most major national publications, including The New York Times, The Washington Post, the Chicago Tribune, The New Republic, The Boston Globe, the Los Angeles Times, The Nation, The Wall Street Journal, and U.S. News & World Report. He has been judge of the Pulitzer Prize and vice president of the National Book Critics Circle. He appears regularly on C-SPAN, NPR, and other radio and TV programs as well as speaking at the Smithsonian Institution, the Library of Congress, ICA (London), and universities around the country.

Besides print medium, Paine appears with Robert Thurman on the CD Thoughts on Buddhism. In 2009 he co-wrote the documentary about the 17th Karmapa, Bodhisattva, with Mark Elliott, and also appeared in the film Crazy Wisdom. He wrote the one-man show, Oh My God! The History of Religion in One Hour, which premiered in 2006 at the Smithsonian and which he subsequently performed at various venues on the East Coast.

Paine currently lives in Washington, D.C.
