= Valdir Cruz =

Brazilian-American photographer

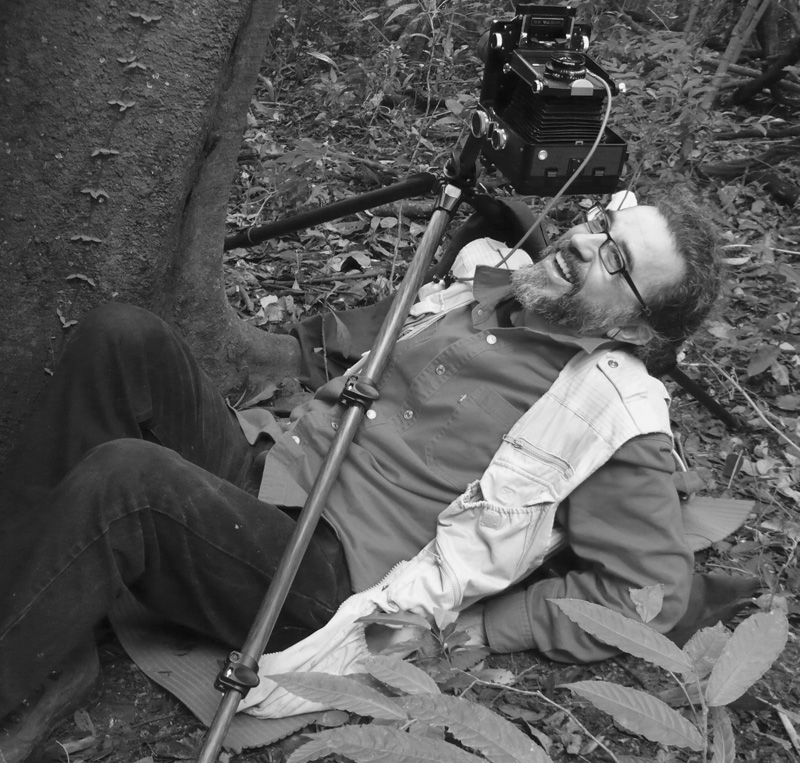

Valdir Cruz (born 1952) is a Brazilian-American photographer. Born in Guarapuava, in the southern state of Paraná, Brazil, Cruz has lived in the United States since 1984. He currently divides his time between his studios in New York City and São Paulo. Much of his work in photography has focused on the people, architecture and landscape of Brazil.

In 1996 Cruz was awarded a Guggenheim Fellowship for Faces of the Rainforest, a project documenting the life of indigenous people in the Brazilian Rainforest. The Guggenheim Foundation further supported this project with a publication subvention award in 2000.

His work is held in the collections of The Museum of Modern Art (MoMA) New York Public Library and Brooklyn Museum, among others.

== Career ==
Cruz became interested in photography in the late 1970s through George Stone’s work for National Geographic and began to study photography at the Germain School in 1983. He then received technical and aesthetic training from George Tice at the New School for Social Research in Manhattan. He collaborated with Tice in the authorized production of two Steichen portfolios, Juxtapositions (1986) and Blue Skies (1987) after which time he devoted his energies exclusive to his own work.

== Exhibitions ==
Since 1982 his photographs have been the subject of more than fifty solo exhibitions at venues including the National Arts Club, New York City; the Houston Center for Photography, Houston, TX; FotoFest International, Houston, TX; the São Paulo Museum of Art, São Paulo, Brazil; Pinacoteca do Estado de São Paulo, Brazil; the Museu Nacional de Belas Artes, Rio de Janeiro, Brazil; and the Oscar Niemeyer Museum, Curitiba, Paraná, Brazil.

== Collections ==
Cruz's work is held in the following public collections, among others:

- Brooklyn Museum, New York: 4 prints (as of November 2019);
- Cleveland Museum of Art, Cleveland, OH
- Museum of Fine Arts, Houston, TX
- The Museum of Modern Art (MoMA), New York, NY
- New York Public Library: 1 print (as of November 2019);
- Acervo Artístico Cultural dos Palácios dos Governo do Estado de São Paulo, São Paulo, Brasil
- Instituto Cultural Itaú, São Paulo, Brasil
- MAB FAAP Museu de Arte Brasileira (MAB), São Paulo, Brasil
- Museu de Arte de São Paulo (MASP), São Paulo, Brasil

== Reviews and commentary ==
His composition is elegant and imaginative. Nothing escapes from his attentive gaze that elaborates a visual universe based on a map of procedures that reveals pure forms and impertinent abstractions, with strange and pulsating lights. His large-format matrix registers a teeming, nearly pristine nature. One can perceive that Valdir waited patiently for the moment at which the entire improbable natural order of everyday scenes enters into revolution and explodes into the beauty of his photography. He discovers certain visible structures and creates a connection between them; he concentrates a disconcerting power in the image that excites our senses.
—Rubens Fernandes Junior

Promoting ecology through art, Cruz’s compendium references multiple inspirations. Audubon, John Muir, Edward Curtis and Walker Evans are touchstones. Echoes of traditional devotional imagery add an extra dimension of interpretive possibility. Rare trees, withered and gnarled, keep reaching….Themes of singularity and struggle couple with a dynamic handling of form and scale. The restrained palette concentrates the impact, increasing punch and power as Cruz imbues his mute subjects with infinite compassion. Emotion and life cry out in these sculptural images, evocatively antiqued and rarified by being represented in black and white. Cruz captures monumentally the “eyeless thing” staring at us.
—Jeffrey Cyphers Wright

For anyone looking at Valdir Cruz's beautiful, silvery photographs of the remote Indians of the Amazon rain forests, it is difficult to shake the notion that they are images of ghosts populating ghost towns…. For the Brazilian-born Mr. Cruz, whose earlier successes as a portraitist centered on the famous—the likes of Henry Kissinger and Spike Lee—it was this sense of something unknown to the world and rapidly slipping away that lured him from his home and studio on West 14th Street into the rain forest. But in the process, what started as a simple project to photograph rain-forest leaders has become a remarkable artistic and now humanitarian obsession for Mr. Cruz.
—Randy Kennedy

For New York-based photographer Valdir Cruz, the view camera is an instrument for disclosure and interpretation, not simply a means of exposure and recording. Through an increasingly complex series of photographic studies, Cruz demonstrates the commitment of a cultural anthropologist and the patience of an artist. Cruz's work is distinguished by its observant and unaffected pictorialism, clarity of vision, and the high achievement of the printed image itself.
—Edward Leffingwell

== Publications ==
- Catedral Basilica de Nossa Senhora de Luz dos Pinhais (New York: Brave Wolf, 1996)
- Faces of the Rainforest (New York: Throckmorton Fine Art Exhibition Catalog, 1997)
- Faces of the Rainforest: the Yanomami (New York: powerHouse, 2002)
- Faces da Floresta: Os Yanomami (São Paulo: Cosac & Naify, 2004)
- Carnaval, Salvador, Bahia 1995–2005 (New York: Throckmorton Fine Art, 2005)
- O Caminho das Águas (São Paulo: Cosac & Naify, 2007)
- Raízes: Árvores na paisagem do Estado de São Paulo (São Paulo: Imprensa Oficial of São Paulo, 2010)
- Bonito: Confins do Novo Mundo, (Rio de Janeiro: Capivara, 2010)
- Guarapuava (São Paulo: Terra Virgem, 2013)
- Retratos de Afeto (São Paulo: Terra Virgem, 2017)
- Presences (New York: Throckmorton Fine Art, 2017)

== Awards ==
- 1996: Guggenheim Fellowship from the John Simon Guggenheim Memorial Foundation for Faces of the Rainforest, a project documenting the life of indigenous people in the Brazilian Rainforest
- 2000: Publication subvention award from the John Simon Guggenheim Memorial Foundation
