= Crab Orchard Series in Poetry Open Competition Awards =

The Crab Orchard Series in Poetry Open Competition Awards are relatively large prizes given out each year to poets with unpublished manuscripts. In addition to the cash prizes, two winners get published by a university press.

The Crab Orchard Review, a biannual journal of creative works published by the Department of English of Southern Illinois University, Carbondale, and Southern Illinois University Press organize the competition, which gives out $3,500 to two winners. Winners must be U.S. citizens or permanent residents of the United States.

Prior to 2009, the Crab Orchard Series in Poetry Open Competition Awards awarded a first place and a second place. These winners received different prize amounts, but all winning manuscripts were published by Southern Illinois University Press.

== Winners ==
Year	Co-Winner	Co-Winner	Judge
2013	Dan Albergotti Millennial Teeth	TJ Jarrett ZION	Rodney Jones
2012	Jeffrey Skinner Glaciology	Jason Sommer The Laughter of Adam and Eve	Cynthia Huntington
2011	Jacob Shores-Arguello In the Absence of Clocks	Wally Swist Huang Po and the Dimensions of Love	Yusef Komunyakaa
2010	Brian Barker The Black Ocean	Camille Dungy Smith Blue	Michael Waters
2009	Todd Hearon Strange Land	Jennifer Richter Threshold	Natasha Trethewey
Year	First Place	Second Place	Judge
2008	Alison Townsend Persephone in America	Jesse Lee Kercheval Cinema Muto	David Wojahn
2007	Ciaran Berry The Sphere of Birds	Jake Adam York A Murmuration of Starlings	Cathy Song
2006	Moira Linehan If No Moon	Honorée Fanonne Jeffers Red Clay Suite	Dorianne Laux
2005	David Hernandez Always Danger	Susan B.A. Somers-Willett Roam	Leslie Adrienne Miller
2004	Victoria Chang Circle	Greg Pape American Flamingo	Richard Cecil
2003	Jon Pineda Birthmark	Lee Ann Roripaugh Year of the Snake	Ralph Burns
2002	Elton Glaser Pelican Tracks	Patricia Jabbeh Wesley Becoming Ebony	Tim Seibles
2001	Joy Katz Fabulae	Susan Aizenberg Muse	Maura Stanton
2000	J. Allyn Rosser Misery Prefigured	Julianna Baggott This Country of Mothers	Rodney Jones
2000		Oliver de la Paz Names Above Houses	Rodney Jones
1999	Marilene Phipps Crossroads and Unholy Water	Elton Glaser Winter Amnesties	Lucia Perillo
1998	Denise Duhamel Star-Spangled Banner	Richard Cecil In Search of the Great Dead	Rodney Jones

== See also ==
- American poetry
- List of poetry awards
- List of literary awards
- List of years in poetry
- List of years in literature
