= Stonecoast MFA Program in Creative Writing =

The Stonecoast MFA Program in Creative Writing is a graduate program in creative writing based at the University of Southern Maine in Portland, Maine, United States. Stonecoast is one of the oldest low-residency creative writing programs in the United States and is notable for being one of only two such programs in the country to offer a degree in popular fiction. The Stonecoast MFA program is a low-residency program. Ten-day residencies for students, faculty, and visiting writers are held each January and June. The rest of a student's academic work during the two-year program is pursued on a one-on-one basis under the leadership of a faculty mentor.

Stonecoast MFA enrolls approximately 100 students in four major genres: creative nonfiction, fiction, poetry, and popular fiction. Literary translation, performance, writing for stage and screen, writing Nature, and cross-genre writing are pursued as elective options. Students choose one track that focuses an intensive research project in their third semester from among craft, creative collaboration, literary theory, publishing, social justice/community service, and teaching/pedagogy The program is accredited through the New England Association of Schools and Colleges (NEASC).

Founded in 2002 by Barbara Lee Hope, Ken Rosen, and Dianne Benedict, Stonecoast came to national prominence under the direction of poet Annie Finch who served as director from 2004 to 2013. One of the oldest of the second wave of low-residency graduate programs in creative writing, following on the first wave of the programs at Warren Wilson College, Goddard College, and Bennington College, Stonecoast departed from its predecessor programs in a number of innovative ways that have influenced subsequent programs. These included more flexibility in cross-genre work, more student input into mentor choice and curriculum, seminar-style classes as opposed to lectures, and more flexibility in third-semester projects. The program received coverage in The Atlantic Monthly feature on MFA programs focusing in particular on its Ireland residency and popular fiction component. Other innovative curricular features include a foundation workshop in poetic meter for incoming poets and student-initiated elective workshops on special topics in writing.

Stonecoast has been ranked consistently among the "Top Ten Low-Residency Programs" by Poets & Writers magazine since 2011.

== History ==
History:

- 1980 The Stonecoast Summer Writers’ Conference founded at University of Southern Maine, held in the John Calvin Stevens-designed Stone House in Freeport, Maine
- 2002 The Stonecoast Low Residency MFA in Creative Writing is developed
- 2004 Poet Annie Finch hired as Director
- 2005 Stonecoast in Ireland program launched
- 2011 Stonecoast is ranked among the "Top Ten Low-Residency MFA Programs" in the first set of low-residency rankings by Poets & Writers magazine.
- 2013 Fiction writer Justin Tussing appointed Interim Director
- 2015 University of Southern Maine gives up ownership of the Stone House and moves Stonecoast MFA residencies to the Harraseeket Inn in Freeport for the winter and the campus of Bowdoin College in Brunswick for the summer.

== Faculty ==
The Stonecoast MFA faculty has won numerous awards including Guggenheim and National Endowment for the Arts grants, Astraea, Hugo, Lambda, and Hurston/Wright Legacy awards, a Lannan Foundation Grant, the American Book Award, and the Whiting Writer's Award. Visiting writers and past faculty have included publishers Jonathan Galassi, Kate Gale, and April Ossmann, novelists Jeffrey Ford, Ray Gonzalez, Tayari Jones, Kelly Link, and Leslea Newman, literary scholars Christopher Ricks and Marie Borroff, social critic James Howard Kunstler, and poets Maxine Kumin, Marilyn Nelson, Ted Kooser, Joan Retallack, Alicia Ostriker, and Reginald Shepherd. Current faculty include Jeanne Marie Beaumont, Ted Deppe, David Anthony Durham, Martín Espada, Aaron Hamburger, Nancy Holder, James Patrick Kelly, Michael Kimball, Debra Marquart, David Mura, Dolen Perkins-Valdez, Elizabeth Searle, Tim Seibles, and Suzanne Strempek Shea.

== Alumni ==
Stonecoast MFA alumni include Cave Canem Prize Winner Indigo Moor; Rona Jaffe Award winner Melanie Drane; National Poetry Series winner and National Book Award Finalist Patricia Smith; and Texas State Poet Laureate Amanda Johnston as well as Wick First Book Poetry Prize winner Joanna Solfrian; novelists Diane Les Becquets, Alexs Pate, Morgan Callan Rogers, and Colin Wendell Sargent; produced film and television writers Debbie Daughetee, Mike Langworthy, Matthew Quinn Martin and Bix Skahill; popular fiction writers Patrick Bagley, Libby Cudmore, Laura Navarre, Michaela Roessner-Herman, Kevin St. Jarre, and J. M. McDermott; poets Autumn Newman, Patricia Smith (poet), Quenton Baker, Roger Bonair-Agard, Cindy Gutierrez, Jeanette Lynes, Nylah Lyman, Joshua Davis, and Karrie Waarala; and creative nonfiction writers Jaed Munchaeroen Coffin, Kim Dana Kupperman and Penelope Schwartz Robinson (winner of the Stonecoast Book Prize judged by Katha Pollitt).

The Stonecoast Alumni Association sponsors readings and literary events around the country.

== Sources ==
- University of Southern Maine > Stonecoast MFA in Creative Writing Program Website
- NewPages.com: Good Reading Starts Here: Creative Writing Programs List
