= Cafagna =

Cafagna is a surname. Notable people with the surname include:

- Diego Cafagna (born 1975), race walker
- Marcus Cafagna (born 1956), poet and professor
- Mickey Cafagna (1943–2009), politician

== See also ==
- Ashley Tesoro (born 1983), actress; born Ashley Lyn Cafagna
