= Frank Giampietro =

American poet

- Born: 1970 (age 55–56); United States
- Occupations: Poet, professor, editor
- Spouse: Cherie Giampietro
- Children: 2
- Writing career
- Notable work: Begin Anywhere (2008)
- Notable awards: Florida Book Award (2008), Sewanee Writers' Conference Fellowship, Kingsbury Fellowship
- Website: frankgiampietro.com

Frank Giampietro (born 1970) is an American poet, editor, and educator. He is the interim director of the Cleveland State University Poetry Center, visiting assistant professor of poetry at Cleveland State University, and affiliated with the Northeast Ohio Master of Fine Arts Program (NEOMFA). He is the author of Begin Anywhere (Alice James Books, 2008), a collection praised for its inventive voice and emotional depth.

Giampietro was the 2010–2012 resident scholar at The Southern Review and has had poems, book reviews, and nonfiction published in numerous literary journals and magazines including 32 Poems, Cimarron Review, Columbia Poetry Review, CutBank, Exquisite Corpse, Fence, Hayden's Ferry Review, Ploughshares, and Rain Taxi.

His honors include a 2008 Florida Book Award (bronze medal in poetry), a Walter E. Dakin Fellowship from the Sewanee Writers' Conference, a Kingsbury Fellowship from Florida State University, and a fellowship from the Virginia Center for the Creative Arts.

He is the creator and editor of two literary websites: La Fovea and Poems by Heart.

Giampietro earned an MA from Washington College, an MFA from Vermont College of Fine Arts, and a PhD in English from Florida State University. He currently lives in Farmington, Maine with his wife, the potter Cherie Gi
