= April Ossmann =

American poet, teacher, and editor

- Born: Santa Barbara, California
- Citizenship: United States
- Education: Dartmouth College, 1992 B.A. Vermont College of Fine Arts, M.F.A.
- Occupations: Poet, teacher and editor

April Ossmann is an American poet, teacher, and editor. She is author of Event Boundaries (Four Way Books, 2017) and Anxious Music (Four Way Books, 2007), and has had her poems published in many literary journals including Harvard Review, Hayden’s Ferry Review, Puerto del Sol, Seneca Review, Passages North, Mid-American Review, and Colorado Review, and in anthologies including From the Fishouse (Persea Books, 2009), and Contemporary Poetry of New England (Middlebury College Press, 2002). Her awards include a 2000 Prairie Schooner Reader's Choice Award. Her essays have been published in Poets & Writers, and by the Poetry Foundation.

== Career ==
Ossmann worked as an assistant, and then associate, editor for the University Press of New England for over three years.

=== Alice James Books ===
Ossmann was executive director of Alice James Books from 2000 to 2008, presiding over a period of growth that, according to Poets & Writers, saw the press budget more than double in size, and saw the publication of the best-selling Here, Bullet, by Brian Turner, which garnered major media attention. According to Publishers Weekly, which interviewed Ossmann on the occasion of Alice James Books’ thirtieth anniversary, "the press received a three-year, $250,000 stabilization grant from an anonymous donor...With the grant, the press added two full-time staffers, upgraded its equipment, and launched a website with secure online ordering. The press also signed with a trade distributor for the first time, Consortium Book Sales and Distribution." According to Valley News (West Lebanon, NH) reporter Kristen Fountain, “It was an all-consuming, life-changing position, during which she stabilized the company's financial structure, increased its output and helped push its books into the national press.”

Since leaving Alice James Books in 2008 to launch her own business, she has worked as a freelance editor and consultant.

=== Teaching ===
Ossmann has taught literature and creative writing for the MFA in Creative Writing Program at Sierra Nevada College at Lake Tahoe, the University of Maine at Farmington, and Lebanon College, and has performed at Stonecoast MFA Program in Creative Writing residencies and the Bread Loaf Writers' Conference as a visiting publisher. She currently teaches poetry workshops and private tutorials.

== Published works ==
- We (Red Hen Press, 2025) ISBN 9781636281728
- Event Boundaries (Four Way Books, 2017)
- Anxious Music (Four Way Books, 2007)

== Reception ==
Publishers Weekly, in reviewing Anxious Music, wrote that Ossmann's voice is "remarkable for its confidence and fierceness." Event Boundaries was a finalist for the 2018 Vermont Book Award, and Ossmann received a 2013 Vermont Arts Council Creation Grant for the manuscript-in-progress. In its review of the book, Library Journal wrote, “The poems are beautiful and subtly witty, complicated and deceptively honest.” Her third collection We was noted as "seeking to mend political divisions through spirituality" and "address[ing] political divide and how to find common ground in your community". Ossmann has been interviewed by radio programs in California, podcast in Vermont, and in print by the Valley News, the Vermont Arts Council, and The Southeast Review.

== Personal ==
Ossmann was born in Santa Barbara, California and raised there and in Richmond and Vacaville, California. She moved to Vermont in 1985, and worked her way through college as a waitress, receiving her A.B. from Dartmouth College in 1992, then earned her MFA from the Vermont College of Fine Arts. She currently lives and works in White River Junction, Vermont.
