= Meg Johnson =

American poet

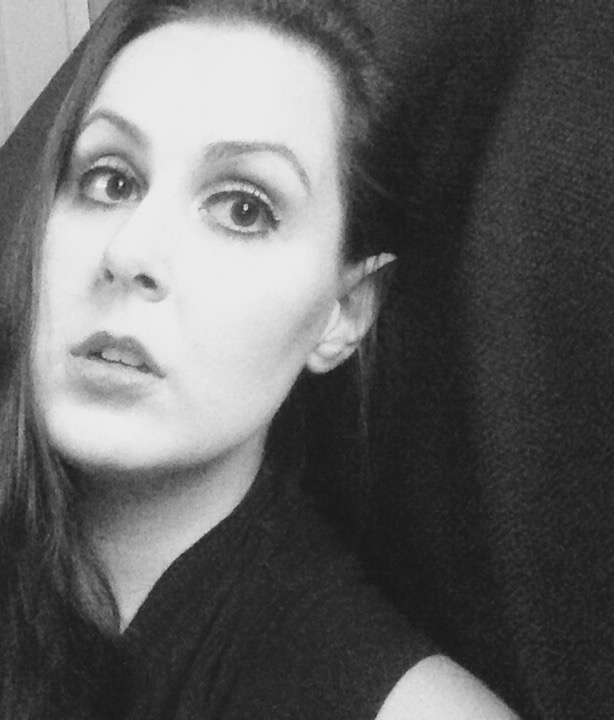
- Born: Ames, Iowa
- Education: MFA in Creative Writing
- Alma mater: University of Akron
- Occupations: Poet; Lecturer
- Writing career
- Genre: Poetry
- Website: megjohnson.org

Meg Johnson is an American poet and lecturer. Her poems have appeared in numerous literary magazines, including Midwestern Gothic, Slipstream Magazine, Word Riot, Hobart, and many others. Her first collection of poems, Inappropriate Sleepover, was released in 2014, her second collection, The Crimes of Clara Turlington, was released in December 2015., and her third book, Without: Body, Name, Country is due to release in September 2020. She is also the current editor of the Dressing Room Poetry Journal.

== Early life and education ==
Johnson was born and raised in Ames, Iowa. She enjoyed dance as a child and wrote poems in high school. She danced with the Iowa State University dance department in high school and later studied dance at Columbia College Chicago and the University of Iowa. Johnson left college early in order to pursue a professional career in dance. She eventually became a principal dancer at the Kanopy Dance Company, the resident company at the Overture Center for the Arts in Madison, Wisconsin. During her six years at Kanopy, Johnson returned to school, attending Madison College and Edgewood College. There, she was convinced to begin studying writing. She went on to the University of Akron where she entered and completed the Northeast Ohio Master of Fine Arts program (NEOMFA) in creative writing in 2014.

== Career ==
As a dancer at the Kanopy Dance Company, Johnson took on numerous roles and choreographed her own dances. She became a principal dancer at the company midway through her tenure. She also served as a dance teacher at the Kanopy School for Contemporary Dance and Choreography.

Johnson began submitting poems to literary magazines in 2009 and published her first poem in a 2009 issue of Slipstream Magazine. As early as 2010, Johnson performed her written work at poetry readings in the Madison area. Her poems were accepted at publications like Slipstream Magazine, Asinine Poetry, the Pacific Coast Journal, and the Edgewood Review.

In 2011, Johnson became a teaching assistant at the University of Akron where she also studied poetry. She also served as the poetry editor of the Rubbertop Review. She became a NEOMFA candidate at the University of Akron that same year. By the end of 2012, her poetry had appeared in publications like Midwestern Gothic, SOFTBLOW, the Rufous City Review, Wicked Alice, Smoking Glue Gun, and numerous others.

Johnson's original thesis for the NEOMFA program was picked up by the National Poetry Review Press in 2013. This collection of poems, Inappropriate Sleepover, was released in 2014 by the publisher. After completing the NEOMFA program in 2014, Johnson went on to become a lecturer in English at Iowa State University. Her second book, The Crimes of Clara Turlington, was released in December 2015 by the Vine Leaves Literary Journal press. Johnson is also the current editor of the Dressing Room Poetry Journal.

== Writing style ==
Johnson writes most often in free verse on topics generally revolving around femininity and the commodification of female bodies. Her writing has been described as both "snarky" and "vulnerable" as it discusses and critiques American cultural norms and the societal expectations of women. Her poems also make frequent pop culture references to prominent figures including Marilyn Monroe, Betty Boop, Justin Bieber, and Victoria's Secret. Johnson has stated that she draws inspiration from Gurlesque poets like Chelsey Minnis and Mary Biddinger.

== Recognition and awards ==
Johnson won the 2015 Vignette Collection Award from the Vine Leaves Literary Journal for her book, The Crimes of Clara Turlington. The prize came with the publication of her book and a cash reward. Her book, Inappropriate Sleepover, was also nominated for the National Poetry Review Press's Rousseau Prize for Literature. Her poem, "Free Samples" was nominated for "Best of the Net" in 2010.

== Works ==
- Inappropriate Sleepover (2014, National Poetry Review Press)
- The Crimes of Clara Turlington (2015, Vine Leaves Literary Journal)
- Without: Body, Name, Country
