= Lagomarsino =

Lagomarsino is a surname. Notable people with the surname include:

- Diego Lagomarsino, a suspect in the death of Alberto Nisman case in Argentina
- Nancy Lagomarsino, American poet
- Robert J. Lagomarsino (born 1926), American politician
- Ron Lagomarsino, American film, theatre and television director
