= Richard Cecil =

Richard Cecil may refer to:

- Richard Cecil (priest) (1748–1810), Anglican clergyman
- Richard Cecil (courtier) (died 1552), English courtier and father of William Cecil, 1st Baron Burghley
- Richard Cecil (poet) (born 1944), American poet
- Lord Richard Cecil (1948–1978), British soldier and journalist
- Richard Cecil (died 1633) (1570–1633), English politician
