= Lou Mathews =

American novelist and short story writer

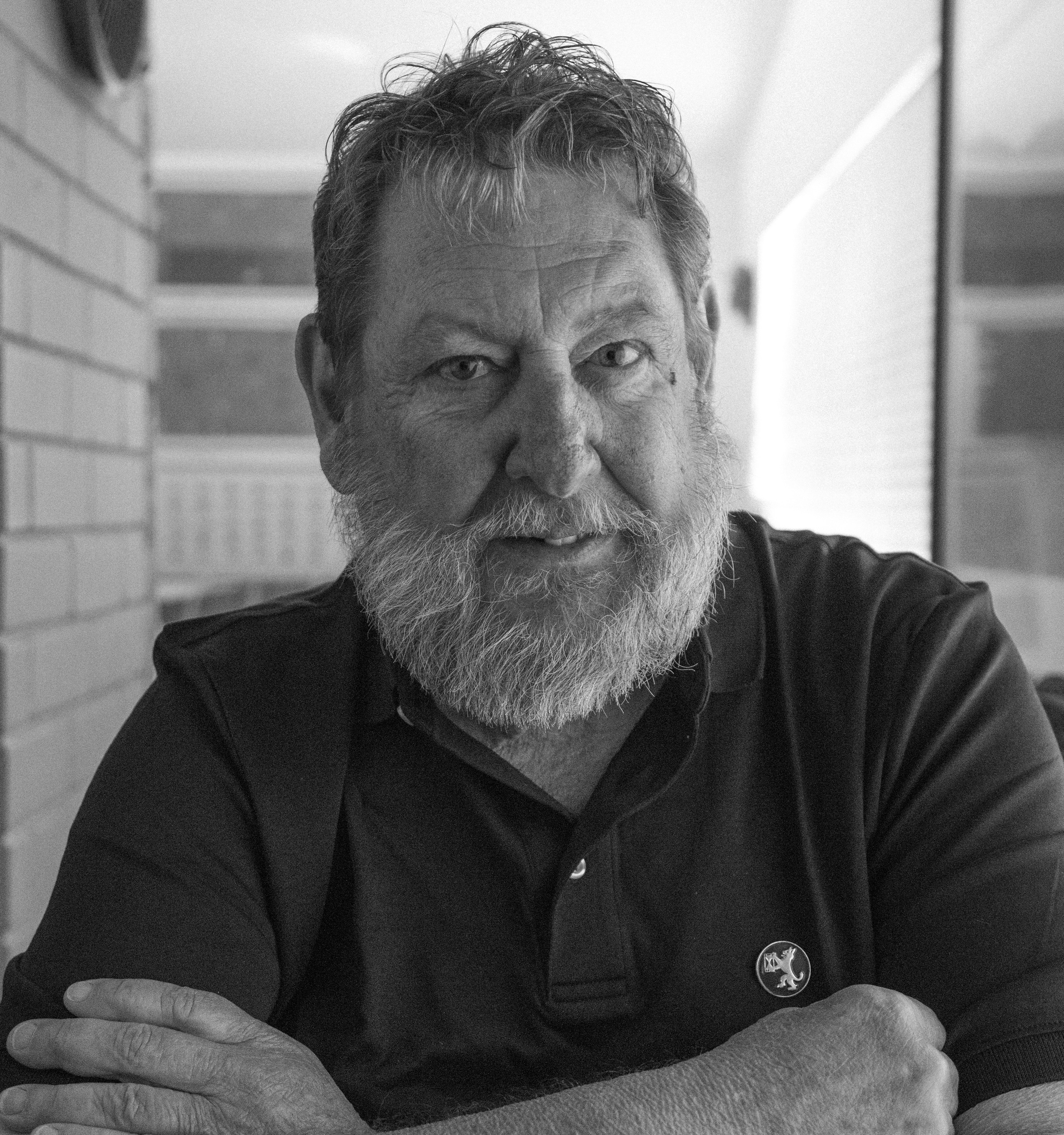
Lou Mathews

Lou Mathews is an American writer based in Los Angeles. He was born in Glendale, California, earned his B.A. degree from the University of California, Santa Cruz in 1973, and his M.F.A. from Vermont College in 1987. His novel, L.A. Breakdown (1999), was noted by the Los Angeles Times as a "Best Book" of 1999. L.A. Breakdown is a novel describing the street racing scene in Los Angeles circa 1967. His novel Shaky Town was published in 2021. His novel Hollywoodski was published in 2025.

== Fiction ==
His short stories have been published in and appeared in anthologies such as The Pushcart Prize XV, The Pushcart Prize Anthology, The Best of the Pushcart Prize, L.A. Shorts, Love Stories for the Rest of Us and The Gotham Writers' Workshop Fiction.

== Nonfiction and Journalism ==
His nonfiction has appeared in the Los Angeles Times, The L.A. Reader, L.A. Weekly, Mother Jones, Tin House and L.A. Style. For eight years at L.A. Style, Mathews was a contributing editor and also a restaurant reviewer. He currently teaches fiction writing and literature at the UCLA Extension Writer's Program, where he was named "Teacher of the Year" in 2002.

== Short Plays & Films ==
Among the short plays that he has written and that have been produced include Rancho Alisos, A Curse on Chavez Ravine, You Did Some Good Work Once, Jaws of Life and a radio play, Captain Manners. The Duke's Development, his first full-length play, was a second prize winner in the 2000 National Repertory Theatre Foundations National Playwriting Contest.

A short film directed by Dora Pena based on one of his short stories, Crazy Life premiered at the Barcelona Film Festival.

== Awards ==
He has received a National Endowment for the Arts Fellowship in Fiction, a California Arts Council Fiction Fellowship, a Pushcart Prize, and a Katherine Anne Porter Prize. Lou Mathews is one of eight recipients of the UCLA Extension Distinguished Instructor Award.
