= Neil Shepard =

American poet

- Born: January 29, 1951 (age 75); Fitchburg, Massachusetts
- Writing career
- Notable awards: First Series Award, 1992; MacDowell Fellow
- Website: www.neilshepard.com

Neil Shepard (January 29, 1951 in Fitchburg, Massachusetts) is an American poet, essayist, professor of creative writing, and literary magazine editor. He is a recipient of the 1992 Mid-List Press First Series Award for Poetry, as well as a recipient of a fellowship from the Virginia Center for the Creative Arts and the MacDowell Colony. He routinely participates in poetry readings and writing workshops throughout the United States.

== Career ==
Shepard completed a BA at the University of Vermont, an MFA at Colorado State University, and a PhD at Ohio University. He has taught at Louisiana State University, Rider University in New Jersey, and Johnson State College in Vermont, as well as in the low-residency MFA writing program at Wilkes University. Shepard was for a quarter-century the Senior Editor of the literary magazine Green Mountains Review and is now Editor-in-chief at Plant-Human Quarterly, an online literary magazine exploring human relationships with the botanical world.

He has published nine books of poetry, his latest two being The Book of Failures and How It Is: Selected Poems. His poems and essays appear in such magazines as Antioch Review, AWP Chronicle, Boulevard, Colorado Review, Denver Quarterly, Harvard Review, New American Writing, New England Review, North American Review, Ontario Review, Paris Review, Shenandoah, Small Press Reviews, Southern Review, TriQuarterly and Vermont Public Radio.

== Poetic Influences ==
Shepard's first creative writing teacher was David Huddle, poet and short story writer at the University of Vermont. Shepard studied with William Tremblay for his MA at Colorado State University and with Stanley Plumly for his PhD at Ohio University.

Shepard's award-winning first book, Scavenging the Country for a Heartbeat, focuses on the national mood of America in the 1970s and 80s, making youthful travels across the country to take its pulse and tell its stories. Shepard's extensive travel, including year-long sojourns in Shanghai, China (1991), the Marquesas Islands in the South Pacific (1993), and France (2003) have influenced his work. Poems about the Marquesas appear in his second book, I'm Here Because I Lost My Way, and Shepard's fourth book, (T)ravel/Un(t)ravel, records his travels throughout Europe, Asia, and the South Pacific. Shepard’s long association with Vermont is recorded in his third book, This Far from the Source, as well as in his fifth and seventh books, Vermont Exit Ramps and Vermont Exit Ramps II, which mix history, natural history, and personal history to investigate life along the highways of Vermont. His sixth book, Hominid Up, is his most overtly political book to date, the first section focused on urban life in New York City and the second section focused on rural life in northern New England. His eighth book, How It Is: Selected Poems, gathers poems from his previous seven collections. His ninth collection, The Book of Failures, draws on the elegiac tradition to explore personal and cultural failure, grief, mortality, and human and environmental fragility.

== Publications ==
- Shepard, Neil (1993). Scavenging the Country for a Heartbeat. Mid-List Press. ISBN 9780922811168.
- Shepard, Neil (1998). I'm Here Because I Lost My Way. Mid-List Press. ISBN 9780922811380.
- Shepard, Neil (2006). This Far from the Source. Mid-List Press. ISBN 9780922811724.
- Shepard, Neil (2011). (T)ravel/Un(t)ravel. Mid-List Press. ISBN 9780922811885.
- Shepard, Neil (2012). Vermont Exit Ramps. Big Table Publishing Company. ISBN 9780984956760.
- Shepard, Neil (2015). Hominid Up. Salmon Poetry. ISBN 9781908836953.
- Shepard, Neil (2016). Vermont Exit Ramps II. Green Writers Press. ISBN 9780996267649.
- Shepard, Neil (2018). How It Is: Selected Poems. Salmon Poetry. ISBN 9781912561001.
- Shepard, Neil (2024). The Book of Failures. Madville Publishing. ISBN 9781956440690.
