= Jon Pineda =

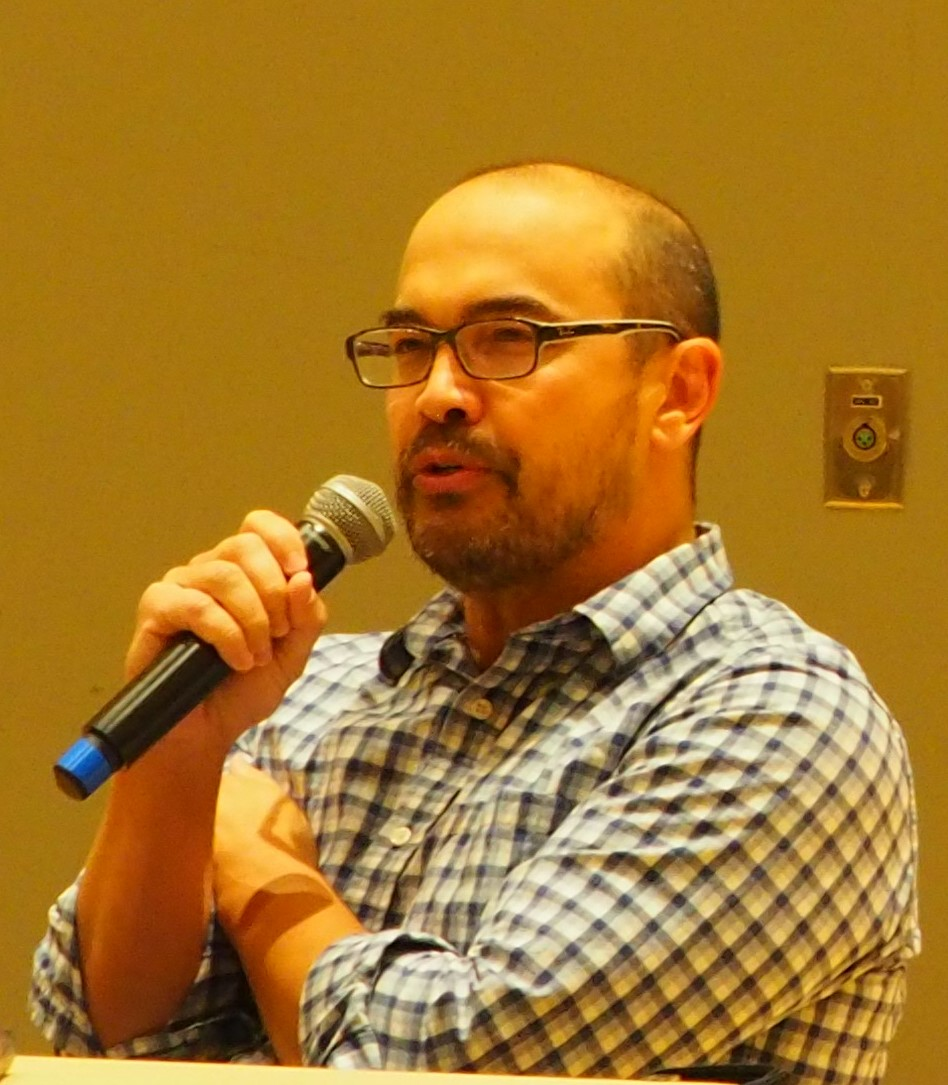
- Born: Charleston, South Carolina
- Education: James Madison University, Virginia Commonwealth University
- Writing career
- Genres: novel, poetry

Jon Pineda (born Charleston, South Carolina) is an American poet, memoirist, and novelist.

== Life ==
Jon Pineda was raised in Chesapeake, Virginia. He graduated from James Madison University and Virginia Commonwealth University.

His work has appeared in Poetry Northwest, The Literary Review, Sou'wester, Prairie Schooner, Many Mountains Moving, Asian Pacific American Journal, Puerto del Sol, and elsewhere.

He is the author of the novel Apology, winner of the 2013 Milkweed National Fiction Prize. His memoir Sleep in Me was a 2010 Barnes & Noble Discover Great New Writers selection. His poetry collections include Little Anodynes, winner of the 2016 Library of Virginia Literary Award for Poetry, The Translator's Diary, winner of the 2007 Green Rose Prize for Poetry from New Issues Press, and Birthmark, first-place winner in the 2003 Crab Orchard Series in Poetry Open Competition Awards.

He currently teaches in the low-residency MFA program at Queens University of Charlotte and is Director of the Creative Writing program at the College of William & Mary.

While at JMU, Jon was the lead singer for Johnny’s Heritage.

== Awards ==
- 2016 Library of Virginia Literary Award for Poetry
- 2013 Milkweed National Fiction Prize
- 2010 Barnes & Noble "Discover Great New Writers" Selection
- 2007 Green Rose Prize from New Issues Press
- 2003 Crab Orchard Series in Poetry Open Competition Awards
- Fellowship, Virginia Commission for the Arts Individual Artist

== Books ==
- Let's No One Get Hurt. Farrar, Straus and Giroux. 2018. ISBN 978-0-37418-524-4.
- Little Anodynes. University of South Carolina Press. 2015. ISBN 978-1-61117-525-7.
- Apology. Milkweed Editions. 2013. ISBN 978-1571311047.
- Sleep in Me. University of Nebraska Press. 2010. ISBN 978-0-8032-2535-0. Archived from the original on 2017-03-16.
- The Translator's Diary. New Issues Press. 2008. ISBN 978-1-930974-75-3. Archived from the original on 2020-03-29.
- Birthmark. Southern Illinois University Press. 2004. ISBN 978-0-8093-2570-2.

== Individual Works ==
- "My Sister, Who Died Young, Takes Up the Task", Poetry Foundation
- "The Muse, or Stars Out on Interstate 81 South", Poetry Foundation
- "Cinque Terre", Poetry Foundation

== Anthologies ==
- Victoria M. Chang, ed. (2004). "Shelter". Asian American poetry: the next generation. University of Illinois Press. ISBN 978-0-252-07174-4.
- M. Evelina Galang; Eileen Tabios, eds. (2003). Screaming monkeys: critiques of Asian American images. Coffee House Press. ISBN 978-1-56689-141-7.
