= Slipstream (magazine) =

- Editors: Robert Borgatti, Livio Farallo, Dan Sicoli
- Categories: Literary magazine
- Frequency: Annually
- Founded: 1980
- Country: United States
- Based in: Niagara Falls, NY
- Language: English
- Website: slipstreampress.org

Slipstream is a literary press, founded in 1980 in Niagara Falls, New York, that publishes poetry and short fiction by both new and established writers. Charles Bukowski, Kaveh Akbar, Sherman Alexie, Gerald Locklin, Wanda Coleman, Lyn Lifshin, Meg Johnson, David Chorlton, J.P. Dancing Bear, Sean Thomas Dougherty, Ron Koertge, Jim Daniels, Neil Carpathios, Rebecca Hazelton, Traci Brimhall, Joel Allegretti, Charles Harper Webb, Jean Hollander, Hal Sirowitz, red hawk, Susan Roney-O'Brien, and Terry Godbey are among the many writers whose work has appeared in the pages of Slipstream magazine. The press also publishes books of poetry by individual writers.

The editors of Slipstream are Robert Borgatti, Dan Sicoli, and Livio Farallo.

== See also ==
- List of literary magazines
