= Alexandra Chasin =

- Alexandra Chasin
- Born: Alexandra Chasin; 1961 (age 64–65); Boston, Massachusetts
- Education: Brandeis University; Stanford University; Vermont College of Fine Arts
- Occupations: Professor, writer
- Writing career
- Language: English
- Notable works: Assassin of Youth: A Kaleidoscopis History of Harry Anslinger’s War on Drugs; Kissed By; Selling Out: The Gay and Lesbian Movement Goes to Market
- Website: www.alexandrachasin.us

Alexandra Chasin is an American writer of fiction and non-fiction based in New York. She currently serves as the Mellon Chair in Humanities for the Bard Prison Initiative.

== Biography ==
Chasin was born in 1961, in Boston, Massachusetts. She attended Brandeis University in Waltham, Massachusetts, where she received her bachelor's degree in European Cultural Studies in 1984. In 1993, Chasin earned her Ph.D in Modern Thought and Literature from Stanford University. She received her master's degree in fiction writing, in 2002, from Vermont College of Fine Arts.

Chasin joined Boston College in 1993 where she served as assistant professor for six years. She taught American Studies and Women's Studies in the English Department at B.C. In the academic year 1998-99, Chasin taught in Women's and Gender Studies and American Studies at Yale as the Stephen Baker Assistant Professor of Lesbian and Gay Studies. In 1999, she was appointed as visiting faculty in English at the University of Geneva. Chasin served as an instructor at Columbia University for one year from 2005 to 2006 where she taught feminist theory as well as literary and cultural studies. In 2006, she joined the Literary Studies program of Eugene Lang College at The New School, with promotions to associate and full professor along the way, concluding her time there in 2026 as Professor Emerita.

== Works ==
Chasin has published several books of fiction and non-fiction. Her first book Selling Out: The Gay and Lesbian Movement Goes to Market was published in 2000 by St. Martin's Press. The book focuses on the political gains and losses that have been attained by marketing to the LGBT community. Kissed By, a collection of short experimental fictions, was published by FC2 in 2007. In 2012, Jaded Ibis Press published Chasin's novella Brief, both as a book and as an interactive app. Chasin's most recent monograph, Assassin of Youth: A Kaleidoscopic History of Harry J. Anslinger's War on Drugs, was published in 2016 by University of Chicago Press. The book tracks the cultural currents that produced prohibitionist drug policy in the U.S.

Chasin's writing has appeared in several print media such as Unsaid, Post Road, AGNI, Denver Quarterly and Chain. She has also written for online magazines including Exquisite Corpse, elimae, Diagram and Big Other. The film, Composer and I, was adapted from the original story written by Chasin. The film premiered at the Athens Film Festival in April 2012.

Chasin was the founder and artistic director of Writing On It All, a public participatory writing project that ran on Governors Island in New York Harbor from 2013 to 2018.

Chasin was a Live Feed Creative Resident at New York Live Arts from 2018 to 2020 with director Zishan Ugurlu. Their full-length performance, Fragments, Lists, & Lacunae, featured Judith Butler and was produced by Live Arts in February 2020.

== Awards and Honors ==
- Fellowship, John Simon Guggenheim Foundation - General Nonfiction (2019)
- Residency, Live Feed, New York Live Arts (with Zishan Ugurlu) (2018)
- New York State Council on the Arts Grant for Writing On It All (2015)
- New York City Housing Authority Grant, with Historic House Trust for LatimerNOW / Writing On It All (2015)
- Fellowship, Leon Levy Center for Biology at City University of New York (2013)
- Fellowship, New York Foundation for the Arts - Fiction (2012)
- Residency, The MacDowell Colony (2012)
- Residency, Yaddo Artist Colony (2011)
- Bunting Institute Fellowship, Radcliffe College (1996)
- Radcliffe Research Partnership Grant and Presidential Discretionary Fund Award (1996)
- Dissertation Fellowship, Whiting Foundation (1990)
