= Elizabeth Powell (poet) =

American poet and professor

Elizabeth A. I. Powell (born 1965 in New York, New York) is an American poet and professor at Vermont State University.

She is the author of the novel "Concerning the Holy Ghost's Interpretation of JCREW Catalogues". In addition, Powell is the granddaughter of Donald H. Miller, Jr. a founder of Scientific American and a Director of the Bulletin of the Atomic Scientists.

== Biography ==
Powell earned her BA at the University of Wisconsin and her MFA at Vermont College of Fine Arts.

She is an associate professor and chair of the Writing and Literature Department at Vermont State University. She is Editor-in-Chief of Green Mountains Review, and is also a member of the MFA faculty at the University of Nebraska, Omaha.

Literary journals that have published her work include "The New Republic", "The Women's Review of Books", American Poetry Review, Missouri Review, Ploughshares, and Seneca Review, among others. Her poetry has received critical attention in "The Boston Globe", "The New Yorker",The San Francisco Chronicle, The Washington Independent Review of Books, Best American Poetry Blog, The Florida Review, Poetry Northwest, and on Vermont Public Radio, among others. Willy Loman's Reckless Daughter: Living Truthfully Under Imaginary Circumstances, which is built on the premise of Willy Loman having an illegitimate daughter, was listed under "Books We Loved" in 2016 in The New Yorker, calling it "a daring hybrid collection that deftly melds lineated verse, agile prose, and striking monologues". Another reviewer called it "fearlessly confessional" and noted that her poetry "pushes form in unexpected ways"; Grace Cavalieri wrote in the Washington Independent Review of Books that every piece was "a delight in style".

Her work has been anthologized in The Pushcart Prize XXXVII (2013) and The Word Exchange: Anglo-Saxon Poems in Translation (W. W. Norton & Company, 2010).

== Honors and awards ==
Her honors include the Pushcart Prize, the New Issues First Book Prize for Republic of Self, and the Robert Dana Prize for Willy Loman's Reckless Daughter.

== Poetry collections ==
- Atomizer. Louisiana State University Press. ISBN 978-0-8071-7390-9
- Willy Loman's Reckless Daughter. ISBN 978-1934695494
- Republic of Self. ISBN 978-1930974036
