= Amanda Johnston =

American poet

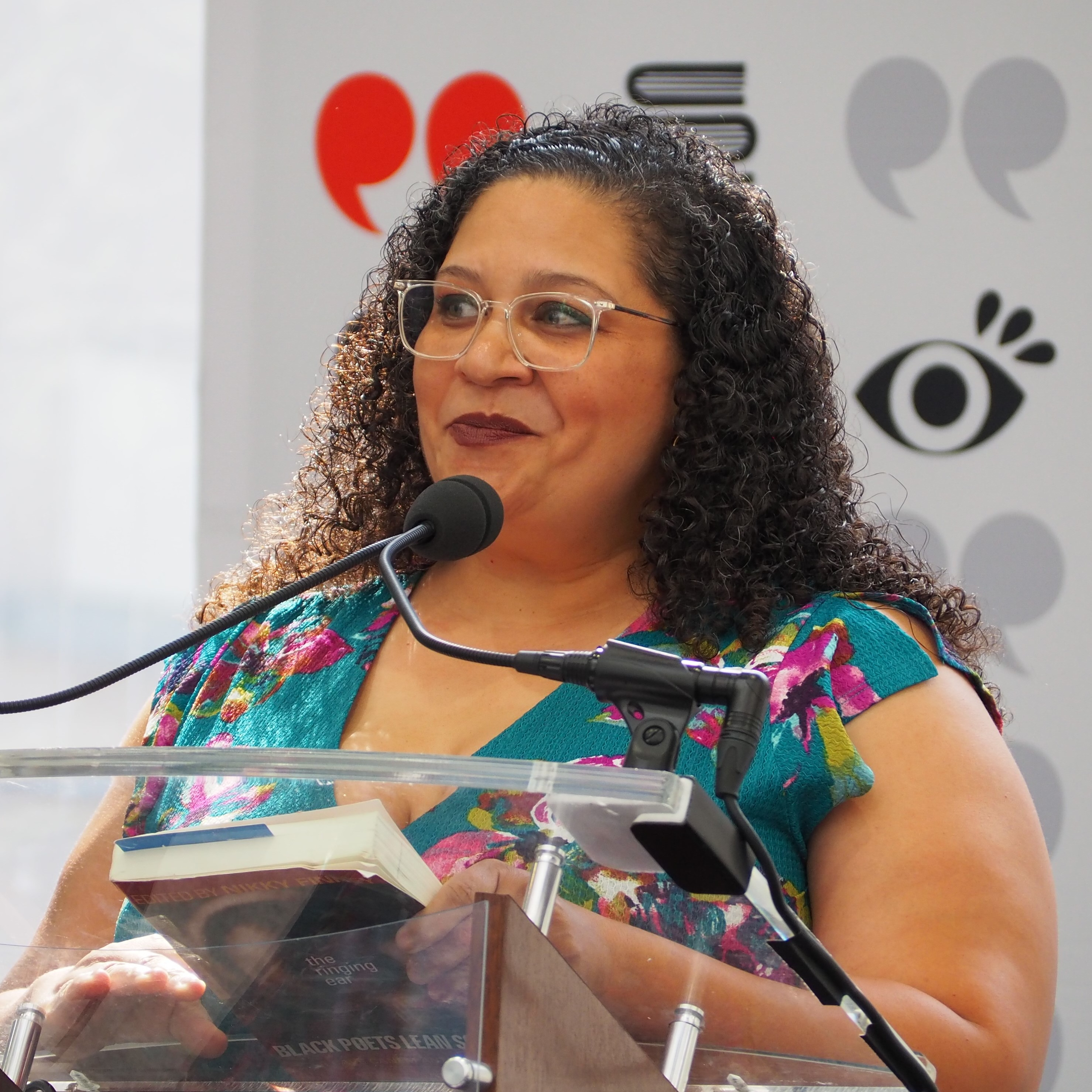
- Born: September 18, 1977 (age 49); East St. Louis, Illinois
- Education: Master of Fine Arts in creative writing from University of Southern Maine
- Occupation: American Poet
- Website: https://www.amandajohnston.com/

Amanda Johnston (born 1977) is an African-American poet. She was born in East St. Louis, Illinois, and currently resides in Round Rock/Austin, Texas. Amanda Johnston received a Master of Fine Arts degree in creative writing from the University of Southern Maine. She is a Stonecoast MFA faculty member, executive director and founder of Torch Literary Arts, and cofounder of #BlackPoetsSpeakOut.

An Affrilachian poet, former Cave Canem Foundation Board President, and Austin Project Fellow, Torch Literary Arts founder and a Black Poets Speak Out cofounder, Johnston is both a poet and performer. As an activist with Black Poets Speak Out, a video project consisting of African American poets protesting police misconduct with poetry, she has highlighted racial and social injustice in the United States.

== Genesis ==
Johnston is the creator of a style of poetry known as Genesis. It is a style consisting of five poems written in columns, and read from top to bottom, plus an additional sixth poem that is created by reading all five columns together, left to right, and a seventh poem that is created from italicized words and phrases in the five columns, which are also read left to right. The poems also must move chronologically through time.

== Awards ==
- 2016 Pushcart Prize Nominee, “Night Hike,” The Quarry, Split This Rock
- 2015 Split This Rock, Freedom Plow Award, Joint Finalist
- 2014 Poets & Writers, Grant
- 2015: Freedom Plow Award for Poetry & Activism Finalist
- 2005: Austin International Poetry Festival Christina Sergeyevna Award
- 2004: Kentucky Foundation for Women Artist Enrichment Grant
- 2003: Kentucky Foundation for Women Artist Enrichment Grant
- "13 Black Poets You Should Know," Blavity

== Selected works ==
=== Printed works ===
- 2019 “History Repeating Repeating,” Thalia Magazine
- 2019 “Crossing In,” Thalia Magazine
- 2019 “forgive me, but another black woman has been killed and I’m shook,” Thalia Magazine
- 2018 “Code Switchin’,” Ice Cream Social Anthology
- 2017 “When My Daughter Wasn’t Assaulted,” Women of Resistance: Poems for a New Feminism Anthology
- 2017 “Photo: White Woman Sitting on Black Woman as Chair on MLK Day,” Women of Resistance: Poems for a New Feminism Anthology
- 2017 “Love is a Bloody Thing in the Dark,” Talking River
- 2017 “Another Morning Blessed Be,” Black Bone: 25 Years of Affrilachian Poets Anthology
- 2017 “Answer the Call,” Black Bone: 25 Years of Affrilachian Poets Anthology
- 2016 “When My Daughter Wasn’t Assaulted,” No, Dear Magazine
- 2016 “How to Eat Bread,” Harlequin Creature, Issue 8/9
- 2016 “On National Poetry Month,” Academy of American Poets for Poetry Magazine
- 2016 “Early,” The Plume Anthology of Poetry 4
- 2016 “Night Hike,” Full: An Anthology of Moon Poems
- 2015 “It Ain’t Prostitution,” Circ’s Lament: Anthology of Wild Women Poetry
- 2015 “Facing US,” Pluck!: The Journal of Affrilachian Arts & Culture
- 2014 “If I Should Disobey an Order,” Straylight Volume 7.22
- 2014 “For the Baby,” Straylight Volume 7.2
- 2013 “How to Drink Bourbon,” Small Batch: An Anthology of Bourbon Poetry
- 2013 “Red Birds,” Cabildo Quarterly
- 2012 “Thyme for Onions,” The New Sound: An Interdisciplinary Journal of Arts and Literature
- 2012 “Genesis,” The New Sound: An Interdisciplinary Journal of Arts and Literature
- 2010 “Oracle,” Reverie, Annual
- 2010 “Girlfriend There Is No Spoon,” Reverie, Annual
- 2009 “Buckle,” Reverie, Spring/Summer Vol. 3
- 2008 "Sparky Considers God's Hands" Cave Canem XI 2007 Anthology
- 2008 “Orange” The Journal of Affrilachian Arts & Culture
- 2008 “Making Brown” Pluck!: The Journal of Affrilachian Arts & Culture
- 2007 "A Burden of Flame: An interview with Amanda Johnston" Callaloo, Vol. 30, Number 4
- 2007 “Suburban Cows” New Literati
- 2007 “Pity” New Literati
- 2007 “Over Breakfast” His Rib, Penmanship Publishing
- 2007 “History Lesson” His Rib, Penmanship Publishing
- 2007 “Over Breakfast,” His Rib, Penmanship Publishing
- 2007 “History Lesson,” His Rib, Penmanship Publishing
- 2007 “Round,” Tempu Tupu, Africa World Press
- 2007 “Mourning,” Tempu Tupu, Africa World Press
- 2007 “Vacant Apartment,” Tempu Tupu, Africa World Press
- 2007 “Have you ever been convicted of a felony?” Tempu Tupu, Africa World Press
- 2007 “Bowing in the Church of Beauty” The Ringing Ear: Black Poets Lean South, Georgia Press
- 2006 “Bowing in the Church of Beauty” Sorin Oak Review
- 2006 “Origami” Sorin Oak Review
- 2005 "Cul-de-sac" Kudzu
- 2005 "Dissecting Heritage" Kudzu
- 2005 "Thyme for Onions" di-verse-city Anthology
- 2004 "Reading in Bed" di-verse-city Anthology
- 2004 "Baby Mama Drama" KRHN Newsletter
- 2003 "Four Line Depression" The Heartland Review
- 2002 "Animal Instinct" The Heartland Review
- 2002 "Miz Cassidy's Vision" The Heartland Review
- 2002 “If Iraq Happens" The Heartland Review

=== Electronic publications ===
- 2018 “When My Daughter Wasn’t Assaulted,” Lone Star Literary Review
- 2018 “Love is a Bloody Thing in the Dark,” In Their Own Words Feature, Poetry Society of America
- 2017 “We Named You Mercy.” Poem-A-Day, Academy of American Poets, Poets.org
- 2017 “When My Daughter Wasn’t Assaulted,” BillMoyers.com
- 2016 “Making Amends,” Stonecoast Review
- 2016 “Peeling Potatoes,” Stonecoast Review
- 2016 “I Embrace You,” Stonecoast Review
- 2016 “Hand to Mouth,” The Offing
- 2016 “Heirloom,” Puerto del Sol
- 2016 “Man Picking Cotton,” Puerto del Sol
- 2016 “Egg Wash,” Puerto del Sol
- 2014 “Mixed Blood,” Kinfolks Quarterly, Issue 2
- 2014 “Blade Speaks at Career Day,” Kinfolks Quarterly, Issue 2
- 2014 “Plea,” La Fovea
- 2014 “The Viewing,” La Fovea
- 2014 “Woman in Red Dress,” Tuesday Morning Love
- 2013 “Asylum,” Cabildo Quarterly
- 2012 “Transition,” Muzzle Magazine
- 2009 “Bomb Threat,” November 3 Club
- 2009 “Domicile,” The Drunken Boat
- 2009 “My Father as a Blooming Stem,” The Drunken Boat
- 2008 "Pinky Wants To Live" The Nubian Chronicles
- 2008 "Swimsuit" Un-Mute.com
- 2008 "First Song" Un-Mute.com
- 2006 “Bowing in the Church of Beauty” Cave Canem Featured Poem
- 2005 “Not Another Love Jones,” Old City Cool
- 2005 “Not My Husband,” Old City Cool
- 2003 "If Iraq Happens" Poets Against the War
- 2003 "Miz Cassidy's Vision" Poetry Repair Shop

=== Work featured on ===
- Bill Moyers Poetry Society of America's series In Their Own Words
- Academy of American Poets Poem-a-Day series

=== Books, chapbooks, CDs, DVDs ===
- 2025 Praisesong for the People: Poems from the Heart and Soul of Texas
- 2017 Another Way to Say Enter, Collection
- 2016 Not An Apology, Anthology, Foreword
- 2015 Pluck!: The Journal of Affrilachian Arts & Culture, Issue 13, Guest Editor
- 2014 GUAP, Chapbook
- 2014 Lock and Key, Chapbook
- 2008 Affrilachian Poets at the Nuyorican Poets Cafe, DVD
- 2008 Excerpts, Chapbook
- 2004 Not Another Love Jones, Chapbook
- 2004 Quickies, CD
