= Kapulani Landgraf =

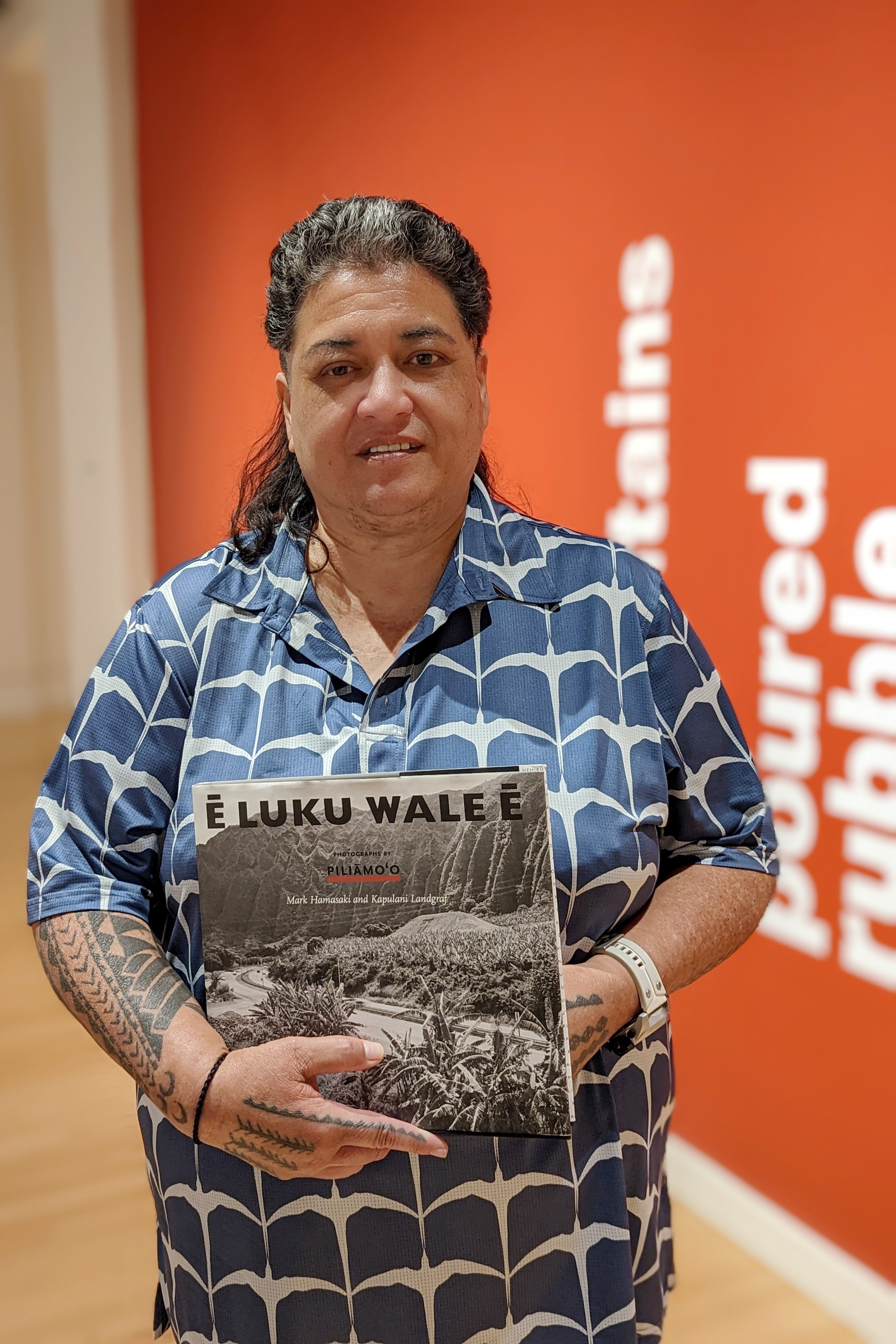
- Kapulani at her exhibit at the 2022 Hawaii Triennial, Hawaii State Art Museum
- Born: Anne Kapulani Landgraf; 1966 (age 59–60); Pu'ahu'ola, Kaneohe, Koʻolau Poko, Oʻahu, Hawaiʻi
- Education: Windward Community College, AA Liberal Arts; University of Hawaiʻi at Mānoa, BA in Anthropology; Vermont College, MFA
- Known for: Photography, collage, mixed-media, installation
- Notable work: Na Wahi Kapu o Maui, 1994; Ponoiwi, 2013; Ē Luku Wale Ē (Devastation Upon Devastation) 2016
- Awards: 1999 - En Foco New Works Photography Award. 1996 - State Foundation on Culture & Arts Fellowship, 1995 - Ka Palapala Pu’ukela Award 1994 – Roy Levin – Jessica Lutz Award, Vermont College 1991 – Image XVI “Kodak Eastman Award, Hawaii

ho 'opa 'a a pa 'a by Kapulani Landgraf, Honolulu Museum of Art with detailed image on bottom

Kapulani Landgraf (born 1966) is a Kanaka Maoli (Native Hawaiian) artist who is best known for her work in black-and-white photography. Through a series of photographic essays, objects, and installations, Landgraf celebrates Native Hawaiian culture while also addressing the legacies of colonialism and its impact on indigenous Hawaiian rights, values and history. While her work often centers on the negative impacts of land use and development, she also alludes to the resilience of the land and the indigenous population. Landgraf says about her work, "Although much of my work laments the violations on the Hawaiian people, land and natural resources, it also offers hope with allusions to the strength and resilience of Hawaiian land and its people." Landgraf's most recent work combines photographic series with objects and installations.

== Education ==
She received a BA in anthropology from the University of Hawaiʻi at Mānoa in 1989 and an MFA in Visual Arts from the Vermont College of Fine Arts in 1995. She currently teaches in the Arts and Humanities department at Kapiʻolani Community College in Honolulu, Hawaiʻi.

== Creative work ==
In her 1994 book, Nā Wahi Pana O Koʻolau Poko: Legendary Places of Koʻolau Poko, Landgraf refutes the tradition of landscape photography of Hawaiian spaces, instead linking place to native Hawaiian ways of knowing and understanding the sacred. In the section "Settler-Dominated Ideological State Apparatuses: Literature and the Visual Arts" of the book, Asian Settler Colonialism From Local Governance to the Habits of Everyday Life in Hawaiʻi, Landgraf describes the history of colonisation in Hawaiʻi, and the effects it has had on the identity of Kānaka Maoli people. Her work is political in nature, emphasizing Hawaiian claims to land and speaks against the continued commodification of the islands by settler groups. Landgraf's work has toured across the United States in the Changing Hands: Art Without Reservation collection. In 2013 Landgraf was awarded the Native Arts and Culture Foundation fellowship. Upon receipt of this award, Landgraf remarked, "The Native Arts and Cultures Artist Fellowship validated artwork created by a Native Hawaiian artist working in Hawaiʻi on a national scale [...] I hope the national award brings a greater awareness and interest to the realities and injusticies, which continue to occur in Hawaiʻi and within the Native Hawaiian community. I also hope it inspires and instigates younger Native Hawaiian artists to go beyond the decorative – to give voice and challenge – to push the boundaries – to make people think."

Her photo collage ho 'opa 'a a pa 'a from 2004, in the collection of the Honolulu Museum of Art looks abstract from a distance. However, a close inspection (see image of detail) reveals that it is composed of photographs that relate to the Native Hawaiian people politically, culturally, and historically. The Bishop Museum (Honolulu, Hawaii), the Honolulu Museum of Art, and the Institute of American Indian Arts (Santa Fe, New Mexico) are among the public collections holding work by Kapulani Landgraf.

- 1999 - En Foco New Works Photography Award
- 1996 - State Foundation on Culture & Arts Fellowship
- 1995 - Ka Palapala Pu’ukela Award
- 1994 – Roy Levin – Jessica Lutz Award, Vermont College
- 1991 – Image XVI “Kodak Eastman Award, Hawaii

=== LANI ===
During the 2013 NACF Artists fellowship in Visual Arts, Landgraf showcased an artwork that spelled out LANI, a Hawaiian word that translates most similarly to heavens, sky, or spiritual. The artwork was part of an installation under the name “Ka Maunu Pololoi? or “The Right bait? and consists of 40 rat traps on the floor to a wall and interconnected to one another. The rat traps were attached to photographs of other artwork commissioned by Kanaka Maoli and pieces of fake money. In 2013 the Honolulu Museum of Art exhibited Ponoiwi, a solo exhibition which takes a stand against the decades-long practice of removing sand from Hawaiian beaches, which often desecrates native burial sites.

=== Ē Luku Wale Ē ===
Landgraf is the co-author, with Windward Community College art professor and humanities chair Mark Hamasaki, of Ē Luku Wale Ē (Devastation Upon Devastation), a book published in 2016 documenting through photographs the final stages of construction of the H-3 freeway. Mark Hamasaki is the co-founded the ʻElepaio Press and is an art and photography professor at Windward Community College. Pilāmoʻo centers their pieces around water and land rights in the Koʻolaupoko region of Oʻahu, emphasizing the importance of rootedness of place.

==== Politics and Social Context ====
===== H-3 Interstate Construction =====
The H-3 Interstate is a 16-mile highway built between Hālawa and Haʻikū Valley, tunnelling through the Koʻolau Mountain Range on the island of Oʻahu, Hawaiʻi. This project is notorious for being the largest and most extensive public works project done in Hawaiʻi to date, the entire lifetime of the project spanning 37 years and $1.3 billion. The project was initiated to connect the Joint Base Pearl Harbor-Hickam and Kāneʻohe Marine Corps Base.

==== Community Response ====
Midway through the project's discussion, President Nixon established the National Environmental Policy Act, forcing large public works projects to go through extensive environmental impact studies, resulting in delay and rerouting of the interstate. Alongside this, many Native Hawaiians, environmental groups, and landowners in the area strongly opposed the H-3 and continuously challenged the construction. While it was fact the interstate path went through several endemic forests, there was much argument and misinformation regarding the existence of heiau, funeral mounds, and ancient Hawaiian irrigation systems along the trail. Nonetheless, the project resumed in full bloom in once Senator Daniel K. Inouye championed the project to be exempt from environmental law, bridging off the 1986 appropriations bill.

==== Activism Through Photography and Literature ====
Kapulani Landgraf and Mark Hamasaki, at this time student and Professor, both went to photograph the construction. Entering from Haʻikū Access road, every Sunday when the construction workers were at home, they went and photographed the demolition of the various artifacts, heiau, and endemic forests before, during, and after the H-3 freeway construction as well as the untidy nature of the interstate's project.

==== Life of Ē Luku Wale Ē ====
===== Published Book =====
Years later after the construction, Piliāmoʻo collected the various pieces of writing and photography in the 168 page book E Luku Wale Ē: Devastation Upon Devastation in 2015, published by the ʻAi Pōhaku Press, designed by Barbara Pope, and authored by Kapulani Landgraf, Mark Hamasaki, and Dennis Kawaharada, authoring the introduction. Contained in the book are various kanikau (dirges) and black and white landscape photographs that build a narrative of on-going grief towards what was lost in the name of progress.

===== Exhibitions =====
Aside from the published book, the kanikau and archival photographs of the construction have been shared in several exhibitions: Curated by Drew Kahuʻāina Broderick, his Thesis Exhibition at the CSS Bard Galleries in the Hessel Museum of Art from April to May 2019 featured 8 selenium toned silver gelatin prints of several photographs from Ē Luku Wale Ē: Devastation upon Devastation that were originally in the first 1997 exhibition of Piliāmoʻo's work in the Honolulu Advertiser Gallery. Additionally, newspaper clippings from Piliāmoʻo's collection were featured, and all work is titled exclusively in the Hawaiian language.

Ē Luku Wale Ē was also featured as part of the 2022 Honolulu Triennial. Located in the Hawaiʻi State Art Museum, the black and white photographs were both large silver gelatin and digital prints with exclusively Hawaiian titles, and included in the exhibit were pages from the published book in large display cases, typographic artwork, and a video installation.

=== 'Au'a ===
In 2019, Landgraf made a collection called “ ‘Auʻa.” Landgraf's collection is one part of four pieces of the “Honolulu Biennial 2019 works at the Honolulu Museum of Art.” ‘Auʻa is a collection of 108 photographic portraits of Native Hawaiians who have made a positive impact on change in Hawaii. “The 108 participants in this 2019 project are artists, activists, friends, community leaders, and academic colleagues.” Written across the participants face and neck is, "I am not American." A reference of chanted words from Doctor Haunani K. Trask. Doctor Trask said this chant at the ʻIolani Palace in 1993. Landgraf got the idea for the concept in 2012 when she went to a “National Endowment for the Humanities Bridging Cultures Conference,” and saw that there was no Native Hawaiian perspective there. People got up and said their message with the opening being “I am a proud American.” When it was time for Landgraf, she opened by saying “I am not American.” She was met with confusion and others disagreeing. It was not easy for Landgraf to get participants for her project, she was met with refusals.They risked losing their jobs, the politics behind it, and being too close to home for them as well. They feared family, friends, and colleagues would see and not agree with them. The message behind this piece is the, “native Hawaiian people stepped up to disclaim America.”

== External Resources ==
- Kapulani Landgraf papers, circa 1987-2025. Archives of American Art, Smithsonian Institution.
