= Nancy Dyer Gray =

American businesswoman (1932–2020)

- Gray pictured around 2015
- Born: Nancy Gail Dyer; November 10, 1932; South Portland, Maine, U.S.
- Died: May 25, 2020 (aged 87); Freeport, Maine, U.S.
- Occupation: Businesswoman

Nancy Dyer Gray (November 10, 1932 – May 25, 2020) was an American businesswoman and conservationist. She established the Harraseeket Inn, in Freeport, Maine, in 1984, and went on to become president of both the New England Innkeepers Association and the Maine Innkeepers Association. She was also the eighth recipient of the Master Innkeeper of New England Award.

== Life and career ==
Nancy Gail Dyer was born in South Portland, Maine, on November 10, 1932, to Rodney William (Bill) Dyer and Beatrice (Bea) Allen. She was their second daughter, alongside Joyce (Jody). Her great-grandfather, Alphonse Dyer (1849–1920), was a sea captain.

After World War II, her parents bought a series of sporting camps, known as Birch Island Lodge, on Holeb Pond, near Jackson, Maine (birthplace of Alphonse), and the family moved there from Portland. At the camp, a twelve-year-old Dyer became a waitress, dishwasher, cook's assistant and window cleaner, while her sister was a cabin boy, charged with starting the morning wood fires and delivering ice.

It was in Jackson that Dyer met her future husband, Richard Paul Gray (1931–2003), who was a teenaged newcomer to Holeb with his twin brother Harry. The two were married in 1955, after Dyer graduated Tufts University and Gray had returned from the Korean War, in which he had served in the 7th Infantry Division, 32nd Battalion, Dog Company between 1952 and 1954. They were married for forty-eight years, until Paul's death in 2003.

The Dyers sold the camp in 1955, and bought Gloucester Traveler in Gloucester, Massachusetts. Nancy and Paul built a home adjacent to the inn and raised four children there: three sons (Rodney, Paul and Nathaniel) and one daughter (Penelope). Another daughter, Jennifer, died in infancy in 1963.

Nancy and her sister assisted her parents in the running of the inn up until its sale. Her father died while building another inn, in Mystic, Connecticut. Jody stayed in Connecticut to run the new inn, while Nancy and her husband returned to Maine.

In 1983, Paul became head of the water district in Gardiner, Maine.

=== Harraseeket Inn ===
Gardiner Water District bought two adjacent properties in Freeport that later became the Harraseeket Inn, established by Nancy in 1984. One of Gray's sons, Rodney (Chip), was the general manager of the inn until early 2020. He was succeeded by Josh Cushing.

=== Other pursuits ===
Gray was the first female chairperson of the Resort Committee of the American Hotel and Lodging Association. She also served as president of both the New England Innkeepers Association and the Maine Innkeepers Association. She was the eighth recipient of the Master Innkeeper of New England Award.

A keen conservationist, one of Gray's phrases was, "No farms, no food!" She spent her life supporting land preservation, the quality of water and the protection of animals.

== Death ==
Gray died at her home in Freeport on May 25, 2020, aged 87. She is interred in Portland's Evergreen Cemetery.
