= Mark Cox (poet) =

American poet (born 1956)

- Born: 1956 (age 69–70); East St. Louis, Illinois, U.S.
- Education: DePauw University; Vermont College (MFA)
- Occupation: Poet
- Children: 3
- Writing career
- Notable awards: Whiting Award (1987)
- Website: www.markcoxpoet.com

Mark Cox (born 1956 in East St. Louis, Illinois) is an American poet.

== Life ==
He graduated from DePauw University and Vermont College with an MFA.

He teaches in the Department of Creative Writing at University of North Carolina Wilmington, and Vermont College.

He served as poetry editor of Passages North and Cimarron Review.

He lives in Wilmington, North Carolina

== Awards ==
- 1987 Whiting Award
- Pushcart Prize
- Oklahoma Book Award
- The Society of Midland Authors Poetry Prize
- Summer 2000, he served as the 24th Poet-in-Residence at The Frost Place, Robert Frost's family home, in Franconia, New Hampshire.

== Works ==
- Four Poems from Numero Cinq
- "Finish This", Slate, Feb. 12, 2002
- Smoulder. D.R. Godine. 1989. ISBN 978-0-87923-814-8.
- Thirty-seven Years from the Stone. University of Pittsburgh Press. 1998. ISBN 978-0-8229-4065-4.
- Natural Causes. University of Pittsburgh Press. 2004. ISBN 978-0-8229-5839-0.
- Mark Cox, ed. (2011). The Memory of Water, by Jack Myers. New Issues. ISBN 978-1-930974-98-2.
- Sorrow Bread: New and Selected Poems 1984-2015. Serving House Books. 2017. ISBN 978-0997779738.
- Readiness: Prose Poems. Press 53. 2018. ISBN 978-1941209783.
- Knowing. Press 53. 2024. ISBN 978-1950413799.

=== Anthologies ===
- William H. Roetzheim, ed. (2006). "Geese". The Giant Book of Poetry. Level4Press Inc. ISBN 978-0-9768001-2-5.
- Roger Weingarten; Richard Higgerson, eds. (2001). Poets of the New Century. David R. Godine Publisher. ISBN 978-1-56792-177-9.
- Ed Ochester, ed. (2007). American poetry now: Pitt poetry series anthology. University of Pittsburgh Press. ISBN 978-0-8229-4310-5.
- William J. Walsh, ed. (2006). "Natural Causes". Under the rock umbrella: contemporary American poets, 1951-1977. Mercer University Press. ISBN 978-0-88146-047-6.
