= Green Mountains Review =

Literary journal

- Discipline: Literary journal
- Language: English
- Edited by: Neil Shepard

Publication details
- History: 1975–2024
- Publisher: Johnson State College (United States)
- Frequency: Biannual

Standard abbreviations
- ISO 4: Green Mt. Rev.

Indexing
- ISSN: 0895-9307

Links
- Journal homepage

Green Mountains Review was an American literary journal published biannually at Johnson State College in Vermont, until a series of regional college mergers led to the creation of Vermont State University. The journal was founded by senior editor Neil Shepard and formerly edited by Elizabeth Powell and Jacob White.

Green Mountains Review was started in 1975. Past contributors of note include Agha Shahid Ali, Marvin Bell, Mark Doty, Stephen Dunn, Donald Hall, Joy Harjo, Laird Hunt, Yusef Komunyakaa, Maxine Kumin, Ann Lauterbach, J. Robert Lennon, Naomi Shihab Nye, Molly Peacock, Benjamin Percy, Robert Pinsky, Alexander Theroux, Anne Waldman, Charles Wright, Mary Oliver, Gary Soto, Robert Walser, Tom Whalen, and David Wojahn.

Green Mountains Review published its last issue in spring 2024, following wider budget cuts at the newly merged Vermont State University.

== See also ==
- List of literary magazines
