= Pamela Harrison =

American poet and educator

Pamela Harrison is an American poet and educator. She is the author of six poetry collections, most recently, What to Make of It (Turning Point, 2012). Her poems have been published in literary journals and magazines including Poetry, Beloit Poetry Journal, Georgia Review, Green Mountains Review, Cimarron Review, and Yankee Magazine. Her honors include fellowships from the MacDowell Colony and the Vermont Studio Center, as well as the PEN Northern New England Discovery Poet Award.

Harrison was born and raised in Oklahoma City, and earned a B.A. from Smith College, and an M.F.A. in creative writing from the Vermont College of Fine Arts. She has taught English literature and creative writing for the University System of New Hampshire and Dartmouth College as adjunct faculty. She was married to Dr. Dennis McCullough (1944-2016), author of My Mother, Your Mother (HarperCollins, 2008) and has one daughter. Harrison lives in Norwich, Vermont.

== Published works ==
Full-length poetry collections

- What to Make of It (Turning Point, 2012)
- Out of Silence (David Robert Books, 2009)
- Okie Chronicles (David Robert Books, 2005)
- Stereopticon (David Robert Books, 2004)

Chapbooks

- Pamela Harrsion Greatest Hits (Pudding House, 2002)
- Noah’s Daughter (Panhandler Chapbook Competition winner, Series #1, University of West Florida, 1988)

== Honors and awards ==
- 2002 PEN Northern New England Discovery Poet Award
- 1988 Panhandler Prize
