= Kali VanBaale =

American novelist (born 1975)

Kali Jo White VanBaale
- Born: January 20, 1975 (age 51); Bloomfield, Iowa, United States
- Education: Indian Hills Community College; Upper Iowa University; Vermont College of Fine Arts
- Occupations: Novelist; educator
- Writing career
- Pen name: Kali VanBaale
- Years active: 2006–present
- Genre: Fiction
- Notable works: The Space Between, The Good Divide, The Monsters We Make
- Notable awards: American Book Award (2007); Independent Publisher's silver medal (2006); Fred Bonnie Memorial First Novel Award (2006)

Kali Jo White VanBaale (born January 20, 1975) is an American novelist who publishes under both her maiden and married name. Her debut novel, The Space Between (as Kali VanBaale), received an American Book Award in 2007, an Independent Publisher's silver medal for general fiction, and the Fred Bonnie Memorial First Novel Award in 2006. Her second novel, The Good Divide (as Kali VanBaale) was released in 2016. Her third novel, 'The Monsters We Make' (as Kali White) released in 2020 from Crooked Lane Books.

== Life ==
VanBaale grew up in Bloomfield, Iowa on a dairy farm. She attended Indian Hills Community College, Upper Iowa University, and Vermont College of Fine Arts where she received her MFA in creative writing.

She has taught creative writing and literature for Drake University and Upper Iowa University. She is a core faculty member of the Lindenwood University MFA in Writing Program.

She lives outside Des Moines with her family.

== Awards ==
- 2022 Lindenwood University Adjunct Professor of the Year
- 2022 Indian Hills Community College Outstanding Alumnus
- 2017 Eric Hoffer Book Award, The Good Divide
- 2009 and 2021 Iowa Arts Council major artist grants
- 2007 American Book Award, The Space Between
- 2007 Independent Publisher's Silver Medal for General Fiction, The Space Between
- 2006 Fred Bonnie Memorial First Novelist Award, The Space Between

== Works ==
- The Monsters We Make. Crooked Lane Books. June 2020 ISBN 978-1643853888
- The Good Divide. MGPress. June 2016. ISBN 978-1944850005
- The Space Between. River City Publishing. October 2006. ISBN 978-1-57966-058-1.

=== Anthologies ===
- "Behind Lace Curtains". Voices of Alzheimer's. LaChance Publishing LLC. May 28, 2007. ISBN 978-1-934184-01-1.
- "Russian Lullaby and A Tale of Two Names". A Cup of Comfort for Adoptive Families. Adams Media. June 18, 2009.

== Nonfiction ==
A&E Network True Crime blog series
