= David Hernandez (poet) =

American poet

- Born: 1971 (age 54–55); Burbank, California
- Writing career
- Notable awards: Crab Orchard Series in Poetry (2005); National Endowment for the Arts Fellowship for Poetry (2011)

David Hernandez (born in 1971) is an American poet and novelist. He was awarded a 2011 National Endowment for the Arts Fellowship for Poetry.

== Life ==
His poems have appeared in FIELD, The Threepenny Review, Ploughshares, The Missouri Review, Kenyon Review, TriQuarterly, The Southern Review, Shade, Poetry Daily, AGNI, Epoch, Iowa Review, Pleiades. His drawings have appeared in Indiana Review.

His father Jaime A. Hernandez, migrated from Colombia to the United States at a young age; his mother Nancy Cornejo is originally from Chile. David is the descendant of a long line of poets dating back to the 1870s, the Gamboa family, and he was included in the book Los Gamboa: una Dinastía de Poetas published in 2008. The book has five of David's poems translated in Spanish by the book's author, Hugo Cuevas-Mohr.

He teaches poetry at California State University, Long Beach, and teaches creative writing at California State University, Fullerton. He lives in Long Beach, California.

== Awards and honors ==
=== Honors ===
- 2011 National Endowment for the Arts Fellowship for Poetry.

=== Literary awards ===
Year	Title	Award	Category	Result	Ref.
2005	Always Danger	Crab Orchard Series in Poetry Open Competition Awards	—	Won	
2009	Suckerpunch	Best Fiction for Young Adults	—	Selection	
2009	Suckerpunch	Quick Picks for Reluctant Young Adult Readers	—	Selection	
2010	Hoodwinked	Kathryn A. Morton Prize in Poetry	—	Won	
2010	No More Us for You	Best Fiction for Young Adults	—	Selection	
2022	Hello I Must Be Going: Poems	National Book Critics Circle Award	Poetry	Finalist	

== Works ==
=== Poetry collections ===
- A House Waiting for Music, Tupelo Press (2003)
- Always Danger, Southern Illinois University Press (2006)
- Hoodwinked, Sarabande Books (2011)
- Dear, Sincerely, University of Pittsburgh Press (2016)
- Hello I Must Be Going (2022)

=== YA Novels ===
- Suckerpunch, HarperCollins (2008)
- No More Us for You, HarperCollins (2009)
