= Marilène Phipps =

American writer and painter (born 1950)

- Born: 1950 (age 75–76); Haiti
- Education: University of California, Berkeley; University of Pennsylvania
- Occupations: Writer, painter
- Awards: Crab Orchard Review Poetry Prize
- Website: marilenephipps.com

Marilène S. Phipps-Kettlewell (born 1950 in Haiti) is a Haitian-American poet, painter, and short story writer.

== Early life and education ==
Marilène S. Phipps-Kettlewell was born and raised in Haiti until the age of 10. She also lived in France. She studied anthropology at the University of California, Berkeley, and graduated from the University of Pennsylvania with an M.F.A. degree.

== Career ==
=== Writing ===
Phipps-Kettlewell has won fellowships from the Guggenheim Foundation, Bunting Institute, W. E. B. Du Bois Institute and the Center for the Study of World Religions, all at Harvard University, as well as from the New England Foundation for the Arts. Her work has appeared in the literary journals Callaloo, Tanbou, and Ploughshares.

Her poetry has received praise for its vivid imagery and emotional depth. An AGNI review of a Harvard benefit reading for Haiti named her poem "Earthquake", on the 2010 Haiti earthquake, among three poems deserving special mention as "the most innovative in their imagery and emotional thrust". Her first full-length poetry collection, Crossroads and Unholy Water, was lauded for combining remarkable images and striking metaphors with accessibility, covering the full range of human experience without pretension.

Her story collection The Company of Heaven earned recognition for its portrayal of Haitian life, with reviewers highlighting her empathy for her subjects and her ability to balance heartbreak with irony while depicting how people maintain hope amid hardship.

=== Painting ===
She has donated paintings to the National Center of Afro-American Artists. In a 1993 review, Vivien Raynor of The New York Times gave a mixed assessment of her voodoo-themed paintings, praising her technical skill and use of color.

== Awards ==
- 1993: Grolier Poetry Prize
- 1995: Guggenheim Fellowship in painting
- 1999–2000: Harvard University W. E. B. Du Bois Institute for Afro-American Research
- 1999–2000: Senior Fellowship, Center for the Study of World Religions, Harvard Divinity School
- 2000: Crab Orchard Review Poetry Prize
- Bunting Institute

== Works ==
- The Company of Heaven: Stories from Haiti. University of Iowa Press. 2010. ISBN 978-1-58729-921-6.
- Crossroads and Unholy Water. Southern Illinois University Press. 2000. ISBN 978-0-8093-2306-7.
- Unseen Worlds: Adventures at the Crossroads of Vodou Spirits and Latter-Day Saints. Wisdom Editions Gold. 2018. ISBN 978-0-9987319-2-6.
- House of Fossils. Calumet Editions. 2020. ISBN 978-1-950743-21-6.

=== Anthologies ===
- Mosley, Walter; Kenison, Katrina, eds. (2003). "Mary-Ange's Ginen". Best American Short Stories 2003. Houghton Mifflin Harcourt. ISBN 978-0-618-19733-0. "Marilene Phipps short stories."
- Miller, Kei, ed. (2007). New Caribbean Poetry: An Anthology. Carcanet. ISBN 978-1-85754-941-6.
- Shange, Ntozake, ed. (1999). "pink". The Beacon Best of 1999: Creative Writing by Women and Men of All Colors. Beacon Press. p. 82. ISBN 978-0-8070-6221-0. "Marilene Phipps poet."
- Fenwick, M. J., ed. (1996). Sisters of Caliban: Contemporary Women Poets of the Caribbean: A Multilingual Anthology. Azul Editions. ISBN 978-1-885214-09-6.
