= Colin Wendell Sargent =

American novelist, poet, playwright, and magazine publisher

- Born: November 5, 1954 (age 71); Portland, Maine, U.S.
- Education: United States Naval Academy (B.S.) University of Southern Maine (M.F.A.) University of Lancaster (Ph.D.)
- Occupations: Novelist, poet, playwright, magazine publisher, educator
- Known for: Founding editor and publisher of Portland Magazine; novels Museum of Human Beings, The Boston Castrato, Red Hands, and Flying Dark

Colin Wendell Sargent is an American novelist, poet, playwright, and magazine publisher. A former U.S. Navy helicopter pilot and editor of the Navy's aviation safety magazine, he founded and has edited and published Portland Magazine (also known as Portland Monthly Magazine) since 1985.

== Early life and education ==
Sargent was born in Portland, Maine, and grew up in the area, spending summers in Kennebunk. He began writing as a high school newspaper contributor and attended the United States Naval Academy, graduating in 1977 with a B.S. in English. While a midshipman, he won the Academy of American Poets University and College Poetry Prize in 1976.

Sargent further earned an MFA in Creative Writing from the University of Southern Maine's Stonecoast MFA program, as well as a PhD from the University of Lancaster in the same.

== Military career ==
After graduation, Sargent served as a U.S. Navy helicopter pilot (1977–1983) with deployments in the Mediterranean, Indian Ocean, and Atlantic. He became the youngest Navy officer to edit Approach, the Navy and Marine Corps Aviation Safety Magazine, while at the Naval Safety Center in Virginia.

== Magazine publishing ==
In 1985, Sargent founded Portland Magazine (also called Portland Monthly) in Portland, Maine, with his wife; he has served as its editor and publisher ever since. The magazine has published work by nationally known writers including Pulitzer Prize winner Louis Simpson, Frederick Barthelme, Sebastian Junger, Tess Gerritsen, Ann Hood, and others. It broke the story of the impending sale of Vincent van Gogh's Irises (leading to nationwide distribution), and in 1991 the New York Public Library purchased its entire backlist (April 1986 onward) for its permanent collection, citing its "original regional coverage and literary merit." In 1992, Reader's Digest contracted to sell subscriptions nationwide.

== Literary career ==
=== Poetry ===
Sargent has published three poetry collections: Luftwaffe Snowshoes (1984), Blush (1987), and Undertow (1994). He received an Individual Artist Fellowship in Literature (poetry) from the Maine Arts Commission (with National Endowment for the Arts support), and Blush and Undertow were named Pick of the Month by Small Press Review.

=== Novels ===
- Museum of Human Beings (2008, McBooks Press) – a historical novel about Jean Baptiste Charbonneau, son of Sacagawea. It received a starred review from Library Journal and praise from Publishers Weekly, Smithsonian, and ForeWord.
- The Boston Castrato (2016, Barbican Press) – a picaresque historical novel set in early 20th-century Naples and Boston; reviewed positively in the Portland Press Herald for its historical accuracy, wordplay, and memorable characters. Sargent's Navy experience as a helicopter pilot informed the Naples sections.
- Red Hands (2020 UK / 2023 US, Barbican Press) – a nonfiction novel based on 800+ hours of interviews with Iordana Borila Ceausescu (daughter-in-law of Romanian dictator Nicolae Ceausescu), whom Sargent met in the 1990s in Old Orchard Beach, Maine. The Portland Press Herald (2023 review by historian William David Barry) called it a "taut, vivid" insider view of the regime; the 2024 profile highlighted its importance amid rising nationalism.
- Flying Dark (2023, Hellbound Press) draws on his Navy experience and the horror of the final flight into the night that we all will take one day.

=== Other works ===
Sargent's play 100 Percent American Girl (about Axis Sally) won the Maine Playwrights Festival and a Maine International Film Festival screenplay prize (as Montebello Ice; under option). His short stories and poems appear in anthologies including Our Best War Stories (2020) and journals such as Line of Advance (where he won prizes in 2017–2018).

== Academics ==
In addition to his teaching in the Department of English at the College of William & Mary, Sargent pursued research in cognitive literary theory, including the deployment of repeatable moments such as 'querencia places'.
