= Todd Hearon =

American poet, dramatist, and fiction writer

- Born: Lionel Todd Hearon; February 1968 (age 58); Texas
- Occupation: Poet/Writer/Musician/Teacher
- Website: www.toddhearon.com

Todd Hearon (born February 9, 1968) is an American poet, songwriter, dramatist and fiction writer. He is the author of three collections of poems—Strange Land (2010), No Other Gods (2015) and Crows in Eden (2022)—a number of plays and essays, and a novella, Do Geese See God (2021). His first full-length studio album is Border Radio (2021), featuring 13 original songs in the Americana and folk/folk-rock tradition. A second studio album, Yodelady, featuring 15 original tracks, appeared in 2023. Impossible Man, Hearon's third studio album, featuring 11 original songs, was produced by Don Dixon and appeared in 2024. Hearon lives in Exeter, New Hampshire, has been teaching literature and creative writing at Phillips Exeter Academy since 2003.

== Biography ==
Hearon was born in Fort Worth, Texas, on February 9, 1968, and was raised in Western North Carolina. He received B.A. from Baylor University in 1990, M.A. from Boston College in 1995, and Ph.D. from Boston University in 2002. He lives in Exeter, New Hampshire with his wife, the poet Maggie Dietz, and their twins.

== Awards ==
- Poet-in-Residence, Dartmouth College and The Frost Place
- Dobie-Paisano Creative Writing Fellowship/University of Texas, Austin
- Paul Green Playwrights Prize
- Crab Orchard Award/Southern Illinois University Press
- PEN New England/"Discovery" Award
- Rumi Prize in Poetry/Arts & Letters
- Friends of Literature Prize/Poetry magazine and the Poetry Foundation
- Campbell Corner Poetry Prize/Sarah Lawrence College
- Songwriters Prize, First Place (for Lyrics)/American Songwriter Magazine
- International Acoustic Music Awards, Finalist/Runner-up (Folk category) for "Mary Dyer"

== Works ==
- Strange Land (Winner of the Crab Orchard Award, judged by Natasha Trethewey, Southern Illinois University Press, 2010)
- No Other Gods (Salmon Poetry, 2015)
- Crows in Eden (Salmon Poetry, 2022)
- DO GEESE SEE GOD (Neutral Zones Press, 2021)
- An online selection of poems can be found here:
- https://www.poetryfoundation.org/poets/todd-hearon
- https://www.memorious.org/?author=27
- https://www.thecommononline.org/tag/todd-hearon/
- https://agnionline.bu.edu/about/our-people/authors/todd-hearon
- https://www.cincinnatireview.com/tag/todd-hearon/
