= Gail Gregg =

American visual artist and journalist

- Born: 1951 (age 74–75); Topeka, Kansas, US
- Education: Vermont College of Fine Arts; University of North Carolina at Chapel Hill; Kansas State University
- Known for: Encaustic painting works on paper collage, photography
- Spouse: Arthur Ochs Sulzberger Jr. (m. 1975; div. 2008)
- Children: 2, including A. G. Sulzberger
- Awards: Walter Bagehot Fellowship
- Website: Gail Gregg

Gail Gregg, Carnation, encaustic on paper, 15.5" x 15.5", 2003.

Gail Gregg (born 1951) is an American mixed-media artist and journalist based in New York City. Her work includes abstract painting, works on paper and objects, collage, photography and artist books. She is best known for encaustic paintings and works on paper that transform everyday, ephemeral discards—scavenged shipping cardboard and crate lids, orphaned photo albums or library cards—into enduring works that emphasize a minimalist approach to surface and pattern, subtle aesthetics, and the hand-made. These intimate and repurposed artworks convey themes involving memory and reflection, transformation, humor, overlooked beauty, and contemporary consumerism and excess. ARTnews critic Ann Landi wrote of the latter works, "The[se] constructions ask us to regard the dross surrounding us but Gregg's sensibility is one of gentle irony and understated elegance. Recycling hasn't looked this good since Rauschenberg's 'Cardboards.'"

Gregg's work belongs to the art collections of the Metropolitan Museum of Art, Museum of Modern Art (MoMA), The Phillips Collection, U.S. Department of State and Whitney Museum. She has exhibited at institutions including the Baker Museum, Beach Museum of Art, Mead Art Museum, Missoula Art Museum and Mulvane Art Museum. Her writing has appeared in ARTnews, The New York Times and Barron's, among other publications.

== Early life and journalism ==
Gregg was born and raised in Topeka, Kansas. Her parents were Ann (née Wehe) and Thomas Merrill Gregg. She studied journalism at Kansas State University, receiving a BA in 1972. In 1975, she earned an MA in journalism from University of North Carolina at Chapel Hill. The same year, she married Arthur Ochs Sulzberger Jr. In 1981, she was awarded a Walter Bagehot Fellowship for economics and business journalism, at Columbia University.

After earning her MA, Gregg worked as a weekly newspaper editor and as a reporter for The Associated Press (AP) in Raleigh, NC. She later worked for United Press International (UPI), in London and Washington D.C. In 1979, she moved to the Congressional Quarterly as its chief economics reporter. Gregg had an extensive freelance career, contributing articles to such publications as Barron's, Institutional Investor, Investor's Daily, The New York Times, Time, Venture and Working Woman.

== Art career ==
Gregg shifted her career toward art in the 1980s, by mid-decade limiting her writing to occasional pieces for ARTnews. In New York City, she studied at the School of Visual Arts, National Academy of Fine Arts and New York Academy of Art. During this period she produced figurative work and oil paintings of suburban scenes at night—primarily silhouettes and blocks of light—that edged toward abstraction.

In the latter 1990s, Gregg turned to abstract paintings rooted in landscape, while earning an MFA at Vermont College in 1998. Solo exhibitions of this work took place at the Bridgewater/Lustberg & Blumenfeld (1998–2001) and Latin Collector (2003) galleries in New York City. Later solo shows were held at Luise Ross Gallery (2007–16, New York), the Beach Museum of Art (2010, Kansas), Five Points Galley (2015, Connecticut) and Loft Nota Bene (2018, Spain). She also appeared in group shows at A.I.R. Gallery and the Wichita Art Museum, and in surveys such as "Dynamic Intervention" (Brattleboro Museum and Art Center, 2013), and "Blurring Boundaries: Women of the American Abstract Artists 1936-Present" (South Bend Museum of Art, 2019; Baker Museum, 2021).

Gail Gregg, Album No. 20, graphite on found album pages, 19.5" x 19", 2008.

=== Artwork and reception ===
Gregg's art reflects the influence of abstract movements such as minimalism, color field painting and the Pattern and Decoration group, as well as landscape painting. In the latter 1990s she began working in encaustic, an age-old, process-oriented painting technique in which hot wax is impregnated with pigment. Critics note Gregg's encaustic work for its mining of the medium's potential for subtlety, rich color, soft luminous surfaces and tactile appeal. Among other qualities, reviewers also note perceptual effects deriving from the paintings' deep surfaces and thickly painted sides, which flirt with illusionism and realism and shift in status between image and object.

Between 1999 and 2005, Gregg exhibited small, emblematic encaustic-on-panel paintings with creamy, mottled surfaces that were compared to birthday cakes or thick ice. Many of these works evolved from sketches she made while airborne over the checkerboard, rural landscapes of the Great Plains, including her native Kansas (e.g., Carnation, 2003). Often titled after small towns, these paintings were characterized by simple geometric (but not hard-edged) patterns, rich atmospheric effects, a gauzy density, and palettes in close tonal ranges that recalled classical colors of Italian landscape painting: russets, olive greens and ochres. In a representative description, critic Lilly Wei wrote that the painting Roza (2000) "suggests a textile pattern, a gameboard, an aerial view, things cultivated, crafted by the human hand, created by the human will and imagination … [and] demonstrates a utopian belief in the sense of order, art's antidote to the chaos and terror of life." Alongside her landscape-influenced patterns, Gregg also introduced rhythmic, meditative stripes and grids that referenced Islamic tiles, using local color (e.g., Marrakesh and Fez, 2000).

In subsequent work, Gregg shifted her point of departure from the landscape to the detritus of a contemporary throwaway culture. In the process, she pushed her encaustic paintings toward relief sculpture, employing found industrial forms as supports: cardboard shipping materials, 19th-century loom cards, plastic packaging. In works like Riesling (2005) and Yellowtail (2007), cardboard wine bottle dividers were transformed into motifs recalling abstract Native American totems; in other paintings, loom card patterns yielded whimsical forms that ARTnews likened to a merging of Paul Klee and Mark Rothko. With the brightly colored relief One Way (2006), Gregg transcended modest material—protective cardboard packaging from a radio shipping box—to create one of her most sculptural pieces to date. She continued to work with encaustic and found materials into the early 2010s, often exploiting cardboard found on the street for its corrugated line patterns or leathery quality (e.g., Rosebud and Scored, both 2012).

Gail Gregg, Gilded Gyre Fragment #92, metal leaf on cardboard, 9.5" x 10" x 1.25", 2014–15.

In the "Album" series (2008–10), Gregg channeled her own familial loss into drawings that explored abstraction and the power of visual autobiography by repurposing anonymous family photo albums and scrapbooks found at flea markets and junk shops. She removed the snapshots, leaving life-worn pages with binder holes, intact photo corners and occasional captions—then filled in the negative space left by the photos with graphite or muted shades of pastel that suggested echoes of the absent originals. ARTnews critic Doug McClemont wrote that the austere black, gray or brown grids "were as entrancing as they were melancholic—devoid of actual human presence, yet saturated with mystery" and capable of "excavating universal emotions—the pain of loss, the frustration of gaps in memory—from the layers of history of unseen individuals."

Gregg returned to the themes of consumerism and excess in two projects presented in her exhibition, "Fool's Gold" (2015). Her "Gilded Gyre Fragment" series (2015) consisted of constructivist cardboard packing forms that she gilded with metal leaf, creating mysterious, precious three-dimensional objects (i.e., "fool's gold") out of refuse. In a photocollage series, she culled and combined luxury magazine images, enhancing their over-the-top qualities, before mounting the final prints behind shiny acrylic to restore their original glossiness. In other and subsequent collage series, Gregg has created visual puns and surreal narratives—some with an ecological theme—by coupling vintage postcards and supermarket flyer material, abandoned library cards and photos, or tableaux of 1950s family life from magazines and other ephemera of the period.

== Art collections and recognition ==
Gregg's work belongs to the public art collections of institutions including the Ewing Gallery (University of Nashville), Metropolitan Museum of Art, Mulvane Art Museum, Museum of Modern Art, The Phillips Collection, University of Alberta, U.S. Department of State and Whitney Museum. She has been awarded artist residencies by organizations including Arquetopia (Mexico), Escape to Create, the Jentel Foundation, the Julia and David White Colony (Costa Rica), Loft Nota Bene (Spain) and Yaddo. She is a member of American Abstract Artists and Professional Women Photographers in New York.

== Art writing and other activities ==
Gregg has written for ARTnews since the 1980s, contributing articles on artists including Romare Bearden, Carroll Dunham, Faith Ringgold and Amy Sillman, and on topics such as life drawing, museum access, art and Alzheimer's treatment and museum labels, among others. She has written catalogue essays on artists including Yoshitaka Amano, Karen Wilberding Diefenbach, Janet Filomeno, Christopher Pelley, Adam Straus and Richard Tsao.

For many years, Gregg served as president of Studio in a School, a non-profit organization that recruits artists to bring visual arts education to public schools and community centers from pre-K to the 12th grade.
