= Bill Rasmovicz =

American poet

Bill Rasmovicz is an American poet. He is author of three poetry collections, most recently, Idiopaths. (Brooklyn Arts Press, 2014). His first book, The World in Place of Itself (Alice James Books, 2007), a 2006 Kinereth Gensler Award winner, which also won the 2008 Sheila Motton Award from the New England Poetry Club. Publishers Weekly likened the poems to "the haunted generalities of Franz Wright and the hunted, bomb-damaged villages of Charles Simic," in its review of the book.

Rasmovicz is a graduate of the Vermont College of Fine Arts M.F.A. in Writing Program and the Temple University School of Pharmacy. His poems have appeared in literary journals and magazines including Third Coast (magazine), Hotel Amerika, Nimrod, Puerto del Sol, Gulf Coast and Mid-American Review. He has served as a workshop co-leader and literary excursion leader in Croatia, Slovenia, Germany, Italy, England and Wales. Rasmovicz is a member of the Alice James Books Cooperative Board and lives in New York City.

== Published works ==
- Idiopaths (Brooklyn Arts Press, 2014)
- Gross Ardor (42 Miles Press, 2013)
- The World in Place of Itself (Alice James Books, 2007)
