= Elton Glaser =

American poet

Elton Glaser is an American poet. He has published collections of poetry and been published in literary magazines.

== Life ==
He is a native of New Orleans, is a retired Distinguished Professor Emeritus of English from the University of Akron, and former editor of the Akron Series in Poetry.

He lives in Akron, Ohio.

== Awards ==
- 2010 Guy Owen Prize for his poem "Do the Do"
- 2009 Guy Owen Prize for his poem "Slow Fuse Around the Cranium"
- 2002 Marlboro Prize in Poetry for his poem, "Meditation in Blue and White"
- 2002 Crab Orchard Award

== Bibliography ==
=== Collections ===
- Glaser, Elton (1984). Relics : poems. Harper & Row. ISBN 978-0-8195-2118-7.
- — (1988). Tropical depressions : poems. University of Iowa Press. ISBN 978-0-87745-201-0.
- — (1992). Color photographs of the ruins. University of Pittsburgh Press. ISBN 978-0-8229-3705-0.
- Glaser, Elton (2000). Winter amnesties. Crab Orchard Review & Southern Illinois University Press. ISBN 978-0-8093-2305-0.
- — (2003). Pelican tracks. Southern Illinois University Press. ISBN 978-0-8093-2516-0.
- — (2005). Here and hereafter : poems. University of Arkansas Press. ISBN 978-1-55728-796-0.
- Glaser, Elton (2023). Ghost Variations. University of Pittsburgh Press. ISBN 978-0-8229-6719-4.

=== Poems ===
Title	Year	First published	Reprinted/collected in
Undead White European Male		The Gettysburg Review	Howard, Richard; Lehman, David, eds. (1995). The Best American Poetry 1995. Simon and Schuster. pp. 77–79. ISBN 9781439106167.
Meditation in blue and white	2003	Glaser, Elton (2003). "Meditation in blue and white". The Marlboro Review. 14&15.	
The coefficient of drag	2006	Poetry Magazine (Spring 2006)	
Exhaustion	2006	Poetry Magazine (Spring 2006)	
Least resistance	2006	Poetry Magazine (Spring 2006)	
Regression analysis	2006	Poetry Magazine (Spring 2006)	
Do the Do	2010	Glaser, Elton (2010). "Do the Do". Southern Poetry Review. 48 (2): 15–16.	Henderson, Bill, ed. (2013). The Pushcart Prize XXXVII : best of the small presses 2013. Pushcart Press. pp. 78–79.
