= T. J. Jarrett =

American writer and software developer

- Writing career
- Genre: Poetry
- Website: www.tjjarrett.com

T. J. Jarrett is an American writer and software developer in Nashville, Tennessee.

== Works ==
=== Books ===
- Ain't No Grave. New Issues Poetry & Prose. 2013. ISBN 978-1936970186.
- Zion. Southern Illinois University Press. 2014. ISBN 978-0809333561.

=== Poems ===
The Children. The Academy of American Poets, 2015. Published in Poem-a-Day.

Anarcha: J Marion Sims Opens My Body for the Thirty-Fourth Time, Summer 2014

== Reception of works ==
Jarrett's poetry has been described as "startling", "deft but forceful", and "ambitious".

She has won the Crab Orchard Series in Poetry Open Competition Award, and the Emily Clark Balch Prize for Poetry.
