= Ted Deppe =

American poet

- Born: Theodore Deppe; Duluth, Minnesota, U.S.
- Education: Vermont College of Fine Arts (MFA)
- Occupations: Poet; professor
- Spouse: Annie Deppe

Theodore "Ted" Deppe (born in Duluth, Minnesota) is an American poet and professor, author of books of poetry. His most well-known collection is Orpheus on the Red Line (Tupelo Press, 2009), and he has had his poems published in many literary journals and magazines including The Kenyon Review, Harper’s Magazine, Poetry, The Southern Review, Ploughshares, and Poetry Ireland Review. He was the Director of the Stonecoast MFA Program in Creative Writing’s Stonecoast in Ireland program.

He worked previously as a nurse for more than two decades in coronary care units and psychiatric hospitals. He received an M.F.A. from Vermont College of Fine Arts and has taught creative writing in graduate programs in the U.S., Ireland, and England. He was raised in Indiana. He and his wife, poet Annie Deppe, lived in Ireland from 2000 to 2003, and returned in July 2006 so Ted could direct the then new Stonecoast in Ireland program.

== Awards ==
His honors include two fellowships from the National Endowment for the Arts, and fellowships from the Massachusetts Cultural Commission and the Connecticut Commission for the Arts, and a Pushcart Prize. He has been poet-in-residence at the James Merrill House in Stonington, Connecticut; the Poets House in Donegal, Ireland; and Phillips Academy in Andover, Massachusetts.

== Published works ==
- Liminal Blue (Arlen House, 2017)
- Orpheus on the Red Line (Tupelo Press, 2009)
- Cape Clear: New and Selected Poems (Salmon Books, County Clare, Ireland, 2002)
- The Wanderer King (Alice James Books, 1996)
- Children of the Air (Alice James Books, 1990)
