= Portland Magazine =

American monthly magazine

Portland Monthly
- Editor: Colin Sargent
- Categories: City magazine
- Frequency: Monthly
- Founder: Colin Sargent
- Founded: 1985
- First issue: April 1986
- Country: United States
- Based in: Portland, Maine
- Language: English
- Website: www.portlandmonthly.com
- ISSN: 0887-5340

Portland Monthly, also known as Portland Magazine and Portland Monthly Magazine, is a monthly magazine based in Maine.

Founded in 1985 by Colin Sargent, it has published writings by Louis Simpson, Frederick Barthelme, Jason Brown, C. D. B. Bryan, Brian Daly, Tess Gerritsen, Ann Hood, Sebastian Junger, Barbara Lefcowitz, Rick Moody, and Janwillem van de Wetering.

In 2026 a handful of critics on an Instagram post of Portland Monthly's exploratory use by its creative team of artificial intelligence tools have argued that the publication's reliance on AI-generated imagery and AI-assisted research risks reducing opportunities for photographers, writers, and other creative professionals.

Other voices in the same discussion recognized a unique photo with an AI 'face lift'.

Portland Magazine takes the editorial stance that technology must be understood, applied, and tested by creators, and further since its establishment in 1985 continues to invite Letters to the Editor and 100% human-written article submissions, especially by Maine-linked creators on this very topic, in order to establish a public forum to discuss this very issue at the highest level. Letters to the Editor may be submitted to the email address posted on the magazine's website www.portlandmonthly.com

== Awards ==
In 2004, Portland Monthly won Best Cover and Best of Show awards at the Maggie Zine Cover Award Competition, sponsored by NewsStand Resource.

In 2007, Portland Monthly received eight awards from Graphic Design USA: overall publication design, two cover designs, and five editorial design awards.
