= Valerie Wohlfeld =

American poet

- Born: 1956 (age 68–69); Sacramento, California, U.S.
- Occupation: Poet
- Education: American University; Sarah Lawrence College; Vermont College of Fine Arts (MFA)
- Genre: Poetry

Valerie Wohlfeld, (b. 1956 in Sacramento, California) is an American poet.

== Life ==
She was educated at American University, and Sarah Lawrence College, and received an M.F.A. from Vermont College in 1983. Valerie Wohlfeld's 1994 collection, Thinking the World Visible, won the Yale Younger Poets Prize. Her book, Woman with Wing Removed, came out in 2010 from Truman State University Press. Her work has appeared in The Antioch Review, New England Review, Journal of the American Medical Association, and elsewhere.

== Works ==
- Wohlfeld, Valerie (1 May 1988). "The Uccello". The New Yorker.
- Nautilus; Beeyard, The Antioch Review, Volume 58 Number 1, Winter 2000
- Wohlfeld, Valerie (2003). "Dove, and: Rib, and: Fire and Flux". Prairie Schooner. 77 (3): 79–81. doi:10.1353/psg.2003.0103. S2CID 72162832. Project MUSE 46828.
- The Sugar Tooth, AGNI, Boston University, Volume 37, 1993
- Trinkets, AGNI, Boston University, Volume 34, 1991
- Vessel, The New Criterion, November 2002
- The Cut Hair of Nuns, The Antioch Review, Volume 61 Number 2, Spring 2003
- Apple, The Seneca Review, Vol. 33 Issue 2, Fall 2003
- Fruit for the Fall, The Antioch Review, Volume 63 Number 3, Summer 2005
- Poppies, Ploughshares, Spring 2007
- HEART: SPECIMEN, VALPARAISO POETRY REVIEW, Spring/Summer 2007
- Wohlfeld, Valerie (2008). "Bejeweled, and: Lot's Daughters". Prairie Schooner. 82 (1): 167–168. doi:10.1353/psg.0.0033. S2CID 72780205. Project MUSE 237473.
- Wind, The Antioch Review, Volume 66 Number 1, Winter 2008
- Wohlfeld, Valerie (27 February 2008). "Vertigo". JAMA. 299 (8): 878. doi:10.1001/jama.299.8.878.

=== Books ===
- Thinking the World Visible, Yale University Press, 1994, ISBN 0-300-06018-1
- Woman with Wing Removed, Truman State University Press, 2010, ISBN 978-1-935503-06-4

== Anthologies ==
- William J. Walsh, Jack (INT) Myers (2006). Under the rock umbrella. Mercer University Press. p. 407. ISBN 978-0-88146-047-6.
- Poets of the New Century Editors Roger Weingarten and Richard M. Higgerson, David R. Godine, Publisher, Inc., 2001, ISBN 1-56792-178-7
- The Yale Younger Poets Anthology Editor George Bradley, Yale University Press, 1998, ISBN 0-300-07473-5
