= Moira Linehan =

American poet (born 1945)

- Born: 1945 (age 80–81)
- Education: Boston College; Vermont College of Fine Arts (MFA)
- Occupation: Poet
- Writing career
- Notable awards: Crab Orchard Award (2006)

Moira Linehan (October 21, 1945 – May 10, 2023) was an American poet born in 1945. She graduated from Boston College, and Vermont College of Fine Arts, with an MFA. She lived in Winchester, Massachusetts, where she worked as an academic administrator. She was a resident at the Virginia Center for the Creative Arts, and the Millay Colony.

Her work appeared in Alaska Quarterly Review, Green Mountains Review, Indiana Review, and Notre Dame Review, Triquarterly.

== Honors and awards ==
- 2006 Crab Orchard Award
- 2001 Honorable mention Thomas Merton Prize of Poetry of the Sacred

== Published works ==
- If No Moon. Crab Orchard Review. 2007. ISBN 978-0-8093-2761-4.
