= Tim Seibles =

American poet (born 1955)

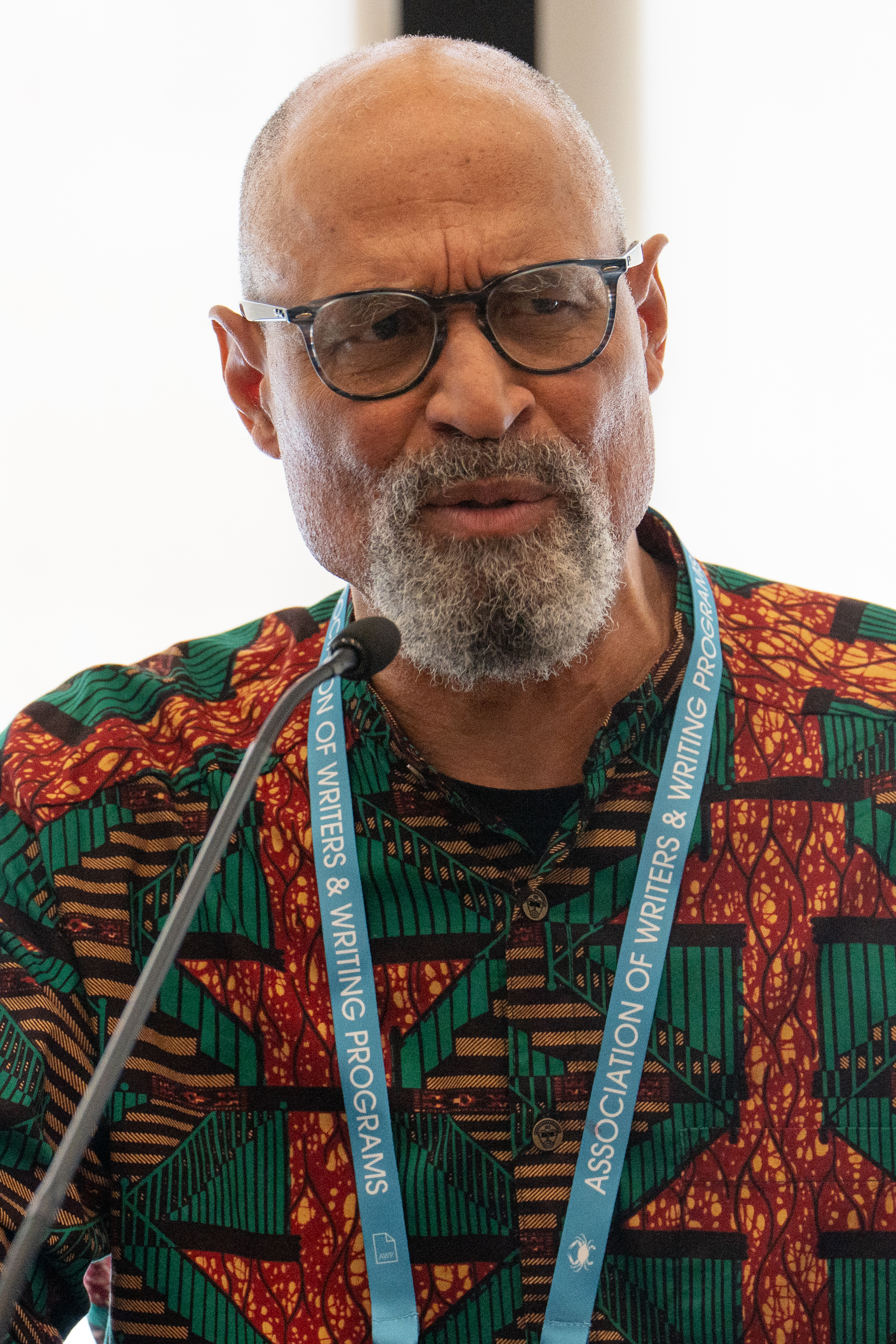
- Seibles at AWP 2026
- Born: 1955 (age 70–71); Philadelphia, Pennsylvania
- Education: Southern Methodist University; Vermont College of Fine Arts
- Occupations: Professor of English; Old Dominion University
- Writing career
- Genre: Poetry

Tim Seibles (born 1955) is an American poet, professor and the former Poet Laureate of Virginia. He is the author of seven collections of poetry, most recently, Voodoo Libretto: New and Selected Poems (Etruscan Press, 2022). His honors include an Open Voice Award and fellowships from the National Endowment for the Arts and the Provincetown Fine Arts Work Center. In 2012 he was nominated for a National Book Award, for Fast Animal.

== Writing background ==
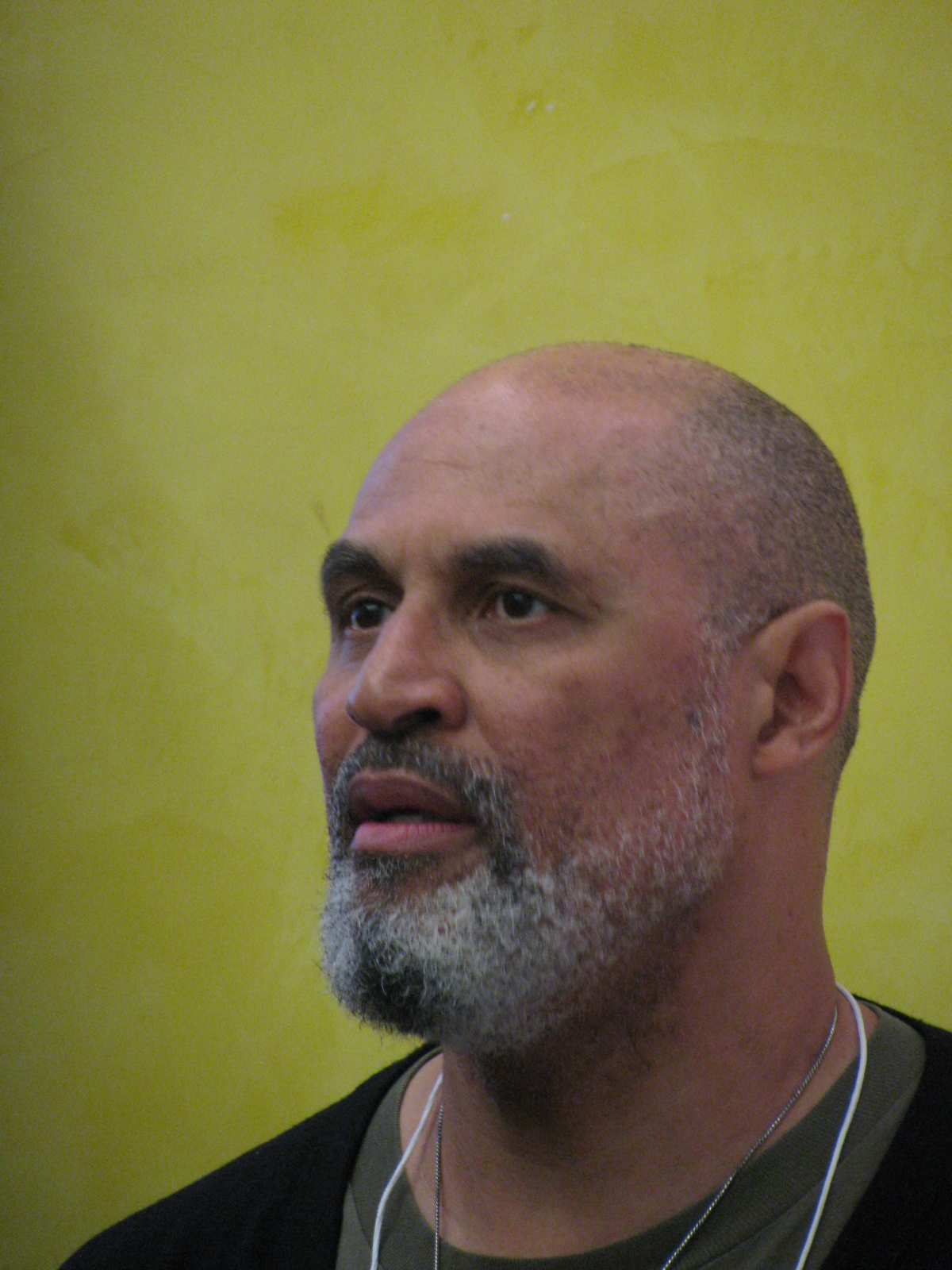
reading at Split This Rock, 2014

Seibles initially got involved in the poetry scene after he heard “Ego Tripping” by Nikki Giovanni as a young teen in the 1960s. This poem for him sponsored his personal writing style and what meanings he portrayed in his poems. Seibles believes that in order to be a successful poet, you have to find the edge between safety and danger in your writing. In his poem, “Welcome Home”, he used this exact idea by challenging the ways of racial predicaments. The Black Arts Movement was critical on the impact that black poets could make on the world. The fundamentals behind his poems are backed by the issues in the lives of the people from all different perspectives. His style includes a vast array from humor to ranting, which he uses to create his powerful poems. He was drawn to writing from the time he was in his twenties because of the freedom to express himself creatively. His poems allowed him to write anything he wanted to, which made him love the art of poetry.

== Work ==
His poems have been published in literary journals and magazines including Callaloo, The Kenyon Review, Indiana Review, Ploughshares, Electronic Poetry Review, Rattle, and in anthologies including Verse & Universe: Poems About Science and Mathematics (Milkweed Editions, 1998) and New American Poets in the 90’s (David R. Godine, 1991).

Tim Seibles book, “Buffalo Head Solos”, published in 2004, takes a dive into some of his covenant pieces of work. In the opening piece, “Open Letter”, depicts what poetry can do for society if used properly. He firmly believes that when you are reading poetry, you should be excited to read it. Seibles’ poetry is much different from the rest. He is chasing a larger meaning that will take many more poets and years to pull off. One of his most important poems is, “Douglass, A Last Letter”. This poem breaks down the life of Frederick Douglass and what impact he had on the world and what was to come in the future. He uses surgically selected stanza sizes to create voices, tone, and rhythm in his writing. The line, “could only be regarded with agonizing wonder and thirst,” out of “Douglass, A Last Letter”, emphasizes the tone he is portraying in this poem. His intended purpose for the creating of this poem was to humanize the people in history like him and what they had to go through compared to our modern day.

== Life ==
Seibles was born in Philadelphia, Pennsylvania and earned his B.A. from Southern Methodist University in 1977. He remained in Dallas after graduating and taught high school English for ten years. He received his M.F.A. from Vermont College of Fine Arts in 1990. He is a professor of English and creative writing at Old Dominion University, as well as teaching in the Stonecoast MFA Program in Creative Writing and teaching workshops for Cave Canem Foundation. He has a son, Cade Seibles. He lives in Norfolk, Virginia.

== Awards and recognition ==
Tim Seibles is the author of seven poetry collections, including Buffalo Head Solos published in 2004 and Fast Animal in 2012. Fast Animal earned the honors of the Theodore Roethke Memorial Poetry Prize, the PEN/Oakland Josephine Miles Award, and was nominated for the National Book Award in 2012. Some of his latest work has been published by the Etruscan Press.

== Published works ==
=== Full-length poetry collections ===
- Voodoo Libretto: New and Selected Poems (Etruscan Press, 2022) ISBN 978-1-7336741-8-8
- One Turn Around the Sun(Etruscan Press, 2017) ISBN 9780990322184
- Fast Animal (Etruscan Press, 2012) ISBN 9780983294429
- Buffalo Head Solos (Cleveland State University Poetry Center, 2004) ISBN 9781880834640
- Hammerlock (Cleveland State University Poetry Center, 1999) ISBN 9781880834459
- Hurdy-Gurdy (Cleveland State University Poetry Center, 1992) ISBN 9780914946984
- Moves (Corona Press, 1988); Carnegie Mellon University Press, 2012, ISBN 9780887485596

=== Chapbooks ===
- Ten Miles an Hour, Mille Grazie Press, 1998, ISBN 9781890887056
- Kerosene (Ampersand Press, 1995) ISBN 9780935331165

=== In Anthology ===
- African American poetry: 250 years of Struggle & Song (Library of America, 2020) ISBN 978-1598536669
- Ghost Fishing: An Eco-Justice Poetry Anthology (University of Georgia Press, 2018) ISBN 978-0820353159
- Seeds of Fire: Contemporary Poetry from the Other U. S. A. (Smokestack Books, 2008) ISBN 978-0955402821
