= Mickey Cafagna =

American politician

Michael "Mickey" Cafagna
- Official city photo

3rd Mayor of Poway
- In office November 3, 1998 – April 11, 2009
- Preceded by: Don Higginson
- Succeeded by: Don Higginson

Personal details
- Born: July 26, 1943 Detroit, Michigan, US
- Died: April 11, 2009 (aged 65) La Jolla, California, US
- Resting place: Dearborn Memorial Park; Poway, California, US
- Party: Republican
- Spouse: Sharon Green Cafagna (m. 1965)

Michael "Mickey" Cafagna (July 26, 1943 – April 11, 2009) was the third elected mayor of the city of Poway, California, serving from 1998 until his death in 2009.

Cafagna was born in Detroit, Michigan, the third son of Italian immigrants. He moved to Poway (then an unincorporated part of San Diego County) circa 1975; following a successful career as a real estate developer, he was appointed to the Poway City Council in 1992, eventually winning the mayoral election in November 1998.

As Mayor, Cafagna represented Poway in the San Diego Association of Governments (SANDAG), serving for a time as its chairman. His other contributions include the construction of Poway's city hall and of the South Poway Business Park on Scripps Poway Parkway, his efforts to fund much-needed improvements to freeways and transit systems, and his leadership during the Cedar and Witch Creek fires of 2003 and 2007, respectively. He was most known for his outgoing personality and his ability to make deals for the benefit of the city. His genial manner also aided him in public situations; Deputy Mayor Don Higginson recounted an incident at the 1998 World Series between the New York Yankees and the San Diego Padres where Cafagna - just before his election as Mayor - invited Higginson and about a hundred others to travel to New York for the first two games. During Game 1, the Poway contingent sat among the Yankee fans, who booed them and threw beer on them. While others got up and left, Cafagna remained and offered to buy the Yankee fans a beer. By the end of the game, they were applauding him; when the party returned for Game 2, the Yankee fans cheered him.

Even his political opponents, such as Poway's first mayor Bob Emery, acknowledged that while they had been opposed to his philosophies at first (Cafagna was a real estate developer, while Emery advocated slow-growth policy), they began to see things from his point of view, just as he saw things from theirs, and they grew to respect his character and his genial attitude. Cafagna had in fact avoided doing his development business in Poway to avoid conflicts of interest, and as Mayor opposed helter-skelter sprawl throughout the region (often with the "How much do we have to grow before we destroy the reasons we live here" speech, as Emery termed it).

In 2005, Cafagna was diagnosed with kidney cancer and underwent an operation to remove it. However, it returned nearly four years later, having spread to his lungs. His illness prevented him from conducting day-to-day city government, and as a result Deputy Mayor Higginson became acting mayor. Cafagna was admitted to Scripps Memorial Hospital in La Jolla on March 5 from what was previously thought to be pneumonia, but later determined to be septic shock; he died there on April 11, at the age of 65. After services at St. Michael's Catholic Church, he was buried a week later at Dearborn Memorial Park in Poway.

Political offices
Preceded by Don Higginson	Mayor of Poway, California; November 3, 1998—April 11, 2009	Succeeded by Don Higginson
