= Harraseeket Inn =

- Interactive map of the Harraseeket Inn area

General information
- Location: Freeport, Maine, U.S., 162 Main Street
- Coordinates: 43.8604158°N 70.1006157°W
- Opening: 1984 (42 years ago)

Technical details
- Floor count: 3 (main inn)

Other information
- Number of rooms: 94
- Number of restaurants: 2
- Number of bars: 1
- Parking: Yes

Website
- www.harraseeketinn.com

The Harraseeket Inn (officially The Harraseeket Inn & Event House) is a historic inn on Main Street, U.S. Route 1, in Freeport, Maine, United States. Although today's business was established in 1984, the building it occupies was built in 1854.

== History ==
Nancy Dyer Gray established the Harraseeket Inn in 1984 in an old Cape Cod-style structure, dating to the late 18th century, known as Conant Farm. It was used a stage station, for travelers between Portland and Brunswick, and run by Deborah Rose Dillingham and her husband, a blacksmith. Gray redeveloped the property into an eight-room building now called the Carriage House.

The main inn, situated adjacent to the north, was built in 1854 and originally had fifty-four rooms and included a Greek Revival building formerly called the Sullivan House. This building is now the Broad Arrow Tavern, one of the inn's two restaurants. Its southern wing was built in 1997.

The inn's other restaurant is the Maine Harvest Dining Room.

It has ninety-four rooms, including nine townhouses.
