= Nancy Lagomarsino =

American poet

Nancy Lagomarsino is an American poet. She is the author of three books of prose poems, the most recent being Light from an Eclipse (White Pine Press), a memoir covering the years of her father's experience with Alzheimer's disease. In describing his reaction to the book, Wally Lamb wrote that "Light from an Eclipse is, in equal measures, heartrending and celebratory of the beauty and buoyancy of life in the face of death." Lagomarsino has published poems in numerous magazines and journals, including Cimarron Review, Quarterly West, The Prose Poem and Ploughshares.

== Life ==
Born in Montpelier, Vermont, Lagomarsino currently lives in Hanover, New Hampshire, where she and her husband David raised two sons, and have lived since 1974. She received her B.A. in English from Northeastern University and her M.F.A. in creative writing from Vermont College.

== Published works ==
- Light From An Eclipse (White Pine Press, 2005)
- The Secretary Parables (Alice James Books, 1991)
- The Sleep Handbook (Alice James Books, 1987)

== Sources ==
- New Hampshire Arts – New Hampshire Poet Showcase > Nancy Lagomarsino
- Alice James Books Website > Various Pages
