= Richard Cecil (poet) =

American poet

Richard Cecil (born March 14, 1944) is an American poet.

== Early life and education ==
Richard Cecil was born on March 14, 1944, in Baltimore, Maryland.

He graduated with a BA from the University of Maryland, an MA from the University of Iowa, and MFA from Indiana University.

== Career ==
=== Academia ===
Cecil was visiting professor at Lock Haven University of Pennsylvania from 1986 to 1987, and from 1987 to 1989 was first visiting assistant professor and then visiting professor at Indiana University. He was then appointed assistant professor at Rhodes College from 1988 to 1989.

As of 2008 he was teaching at Indiana University Bloomington as a teacher of creative writing in the English Department, and in the university's Hutton Honors College, as well as in the Spalding University brief-residency MFA Program in Louisville, Kentucky.

=== Writing ===
Cecil's first collection of poetry, Einstein's Brain was published in 1986. This was followed by Alcatraz (1992), which was the recipient of the 1991 Verna Emery Poetry Award, and In Search of the Great Dead in 1999. In 2004, Twenty First Century Blues was published by Southern Illinois University Press in 2004.

His work has appeared in American Poetry Review, Crab Orchard Review, Poetry, Ploughshares, New England Review, The Georgia Review, Missouri Review, Southern Review, River Styx, Virginia Quarterly Review.

== Awards ==
- 1998: 2nd place, Crab Orchard Award
- 1991: Verna Emery Poetry Award, for Alcatraz

== Personal life ==
Cecil married poet and author Maura Stanton in 1971.

== Works ==
- "Caliban and Ariel". American Poetry Review. November 1995. Archived from the original on 3 March 2009.
- Einstein's Brain. University of Utah Press. 1986. ISBN 978-0-87480-255-9.
- Alcatraz. West Lafayette, Indiana: Purdue University Press. 1992. ISBN 978-1-55753-015-8.
- In Search of the Great Dead. Crab Orchard Review. 1999. ISBN 978-0-8093-2260-2.
- Twenty first century blues. SIU Press. 2004. ISBN 978-0-8093-2597-9.

=== Ploughshares ===
- "Willie Sutton's Insomnia". Ploughshares. Spring 1974. Archived from the original on 19 August 2006.
- "Darwin Explains Sex in Marriage in Spring". Ploughshares. Spring 1974. Archived from the original on 20 August 2006.
- "St. Anthony at Fifteen". Ploughshares. Spring 1974. Archived from the original on 19 August 2006.
- "Hands in Winter". Ploughshares. Spring 1974. Archived from the original on 3 December 2003.
- "Dialogue". Ploughshares. Spring 1977. Archived from the original on 6 February 2005.
- "Dialogue". Ploughshares. Spring 1977. Archived from the original on 6 February 2005.
- "Genre Painting". Ploughshares. Winter 1984. Archived from the original on 4 October 2006.
- "Night School". Ploughshares. Winter 1984. Archived from the original on 3 December 2003.
- "Applications". Ploughshares. Spring 1985. Archived from the original on 13 May 2002.
- "The Call". Ploughshares. Spring 1985. Archived from the original on 3 December 2003.
- "Reply to the Goslar Letter". Ploughshares. Spring 1989. Archived from the original on 3 December 2003.
- "Reply San Francisco Modern Language Convention". Ploughshares. Spring 1989. Archived from the original on 3 December 2003.
- "In Search of the Great Dead". Ploughshares. Spring 1997. Archived from the original on 3 December 2003.
- "Why I Have No Children". Ploughshares. Winter 1997–1998. Archived from the original on 3 December 2003.
