= Marcus Cafagña =

American poet (born 1956)

- Born: December 12, 1956 (age 69); Ann Arbor, Michigan, U.S.
- Education: Michigan State University (BA, MA); Vermont College of Fine Arts (MFA)
- Occupations: Poet; professor
- Spouse: Dianne Kitsmiller (died 1993)

Marcus Cafagña (born December 12, 1956, in Ann Arbor, Michigan) is an American poet and professor. He is author of three poetry collections, most recently, All the Rage in the Afterlife This Season (Finishing Line Press, 2023), and has published poems published in literary journals and magazines including AGNI, Witness, and Poetry Magazine, and in anthologies.

== Life ==
He graduated from Michigan State University with a BA in 1986 and an MA in 1989 as well as an MFA from Vermont College of Fine Arts in 1998. He taught at Missouri State University. His first marriage, to the poet Dianne Kitsmiller, ended with her death in 1993. He and his second wife, Jenn, have a son named Diego.

== Awards ==
- 1995 National Poetry Series, for The Broken World: Poems

== Published works ==
Full-length Collections

- The broken world: poems. University of Illinois Press. 1996. ISBN 978-0-252-06550-7.
- Roman Fever. Invisible Cities Press. April 1, 2001. ISBN 978-0-9679683-6-0.
- All the Rage in the Afterlife. Finishing Line Press. 2023. ISBN 979-8-88838-025-3.

Anthology Publications

- Roger Weingarten; Richard Higgerson, eds. (2001). "The Cockroaches of the Tuol Sleng Museum". Poets of the New Century. David R. Godine Publisher. ISBN 978-1-56792-178-6.
- Craig Crist-Evans; Kate Fetherston; Roger Weingarten, eds. (2006). Manthology: poems on the male experience. University of Iowa Press. ISBN 978-0-87745-988-0.
