= Barbara Lefcowitz =

American poet

Barbara Lefcowitz (1935 – October 8, 2015) was a professor of English at Anne Arundel College in Maryland and poet from Bethesda, Maryland, whose books include Red and White Lies and Photo, Bomb, Red Chair: New Poems. Lefcowitz has been the recipient of grants and fellowships from the Rockefeller Foundation, the Maryland Arts Council, and the National Endowment for the Arts.

== Biography ==
Lefcowitz was born in Brooklyn, New York in 1935. She attended Erasmus Hall H.S. and Smith College, where she was elected to Phi Beta Kappa. She received her M.A. in British and American Literature from the State University of New York, Buffalo and her Ph.D. in English from the University of Maryland, College Park. She published nine books of poetry and won writing awards and fellowships from such places as The National Endowment for the Arts.

She lived in Bethesda, Maryland from 1965 to 2015. Her husband, Allan Lefcowitz, was a professor of English at the United States Naval Academy in Annapolis, Maryland. They had two children, Marjorie Schwarzer of Oakland, California, and Eric Lefcowitz of Port Washington, New York, and three grandchildren.

She died on October 8, 2015.

== Selected works ==
- 1978 - A Risk of Green (Gallimaufry)
- 1981 - The Wild Piano (Dryad Press)
- 1986 - The Queen of Lost Baggage (Washington Writers Publishing House)
- 1992 - Shadows and Goatbones (Scop)
- 1994 - Red Lies and White Lies (East Coast Books)
- 1996 - The Minarets of Vienna (Chestnut Hills Press)
- 1999 - A Hand of Stars (Dancing Moon Press)
- 2001 - The Politics of Snow, 100 New Poems (Dancing Moon Press)
- 2004 - Photo, Bomb, Red Chair: New Poems (Fithian Press)
- 2007 - The Blue Train to America (Dancing Moon Press)
