= Vermont College of Fine Arts =

Fine arts college in Montpelier, Vermont

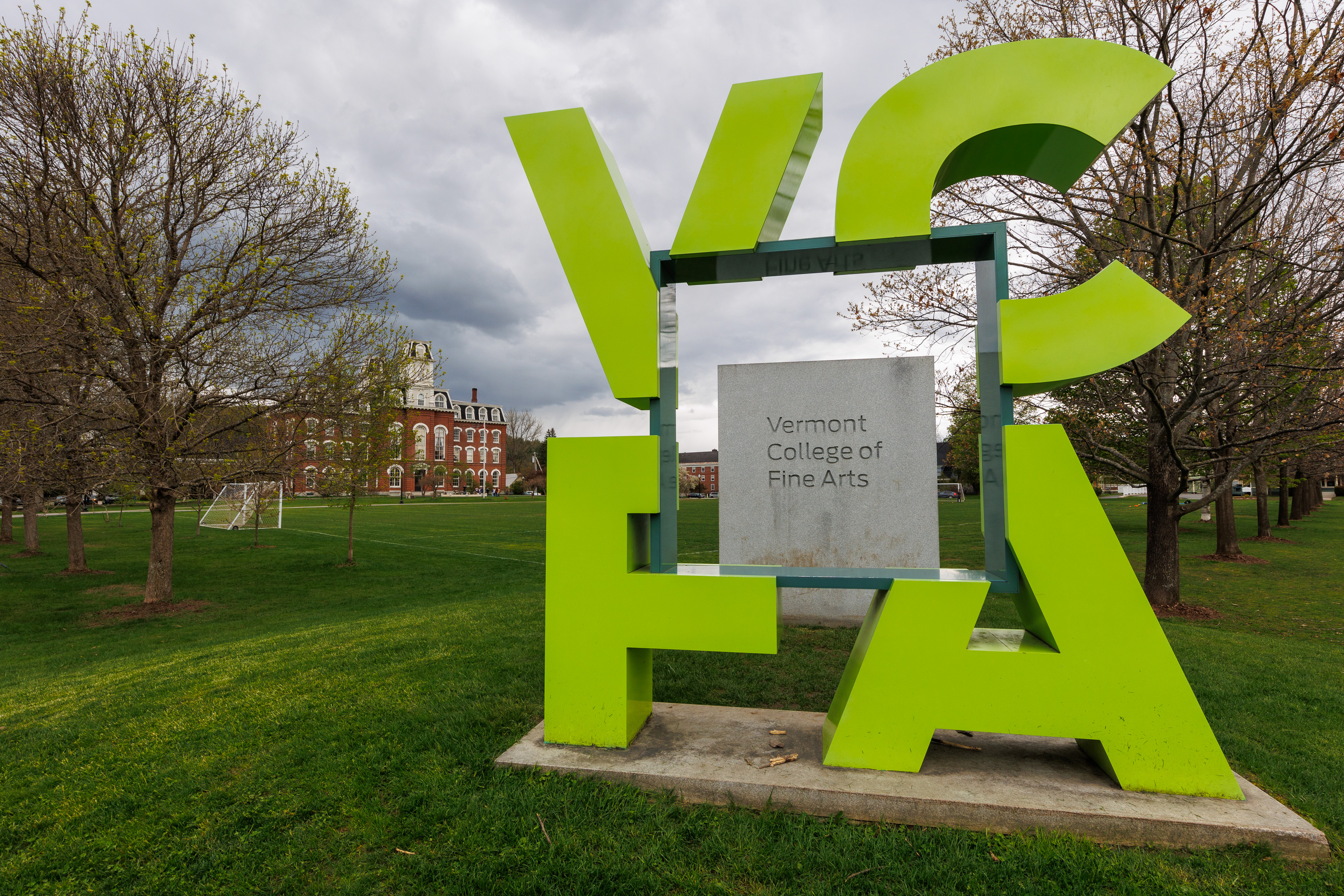
- Type: Affiliated College
- Established: 1834; 192 years ago; part of California Institute of the Arts since 2024
- Affiliations: New England Commission of Higher Education
- President: Andrew Ramsammy
- Faculty: 98 (PT)/ 0 (FT)
- Undergraduates: 0
- Postgraduates: 363 (2023)
- Location: United States
- Campus: Low Residency at California Institute of the Arts
- Colors: Green and white
- Website: vcfa.edu

Vermont College of Fine Arts (VCFA) is a private college that is an affiliate of the California Institute of the Arts (CalArts). It offers a Master of Fine Arts degree with six different concentrations in a low-residency format. The literary magazine Hunger Mountain is operated by VCFA writing faculty and students.

== History ==
Vermont College of Fine Arts traces its roots to the Newbury Seminary, which first opened in Newbury, Vermont in 1834. One of the earliest faculty members and principal for two years was Clark T. Hinman who later became the first president of Northwestern University.

The seminary moved in Montpelier in 1868. After existing in several forms including a Wesleyan Seminary and a Methodist Seminary, using the name Montpelier Seminary, it became Vermont Junior College in 1941. In 1958, it became Vermont College. In 1972, Vermont College became a part of the larger Norwich University.

In 2001 Vermont College became a part of the Ohio-based Union Institute & University and in 2008, the MFA programs of Vermont College along with the Vermont physical campus separated from Union Institute & University and incorporated as Vermont College of Fine Arts (VCFA).

VCFA moved its residencies away from Vermont after June of 2022. The residencies in 2023 and 2024 were held on the campus of Colorado College and Susquehanna University in Pennsylvania.

In April of 2024, VCFA became an affiliate college of the California Institute of the Arts (CalArts) and began hosting its residences on the CalArts campus in the Los Angeles metro beginning in January 2025.

== Academics ==
Programs feature writers-in-residence, artists-in-residence, and artist-scholars such as Richard Russo, Andrew Blauvelt, Susan Cooper, Gregory Maguire, Holly Black and Meredith Davis, who give lectures, readings, and workshops.

Around a hundred different authors, designers, filmmakers, composers, artists, and scholars teach at Vermont College of Fine Arts in a part-time capacity and all have terminal degrees in their field.

=== Programs ===
The Master of Fine Arts (MFA) in Writing program was established in 1981 and the MFA in Visual Art in 1991. The MFA in Writing for Children & Young Adults, the first "MFA program in writing for young readers," began in January 1997. In 2011, it launched an MFA in Music Composition program and an MFA in Graphic Design program The MFA in Film program was established in 2013. In 2014, the residential MFA in Writing and Publishing began, and the Graduate Studies in Art & Design Education Program was established in 2015. The newest program is the International MFA in Creative Writing & Literary Translation, which enrolled its first students in 2018.

=== Multiple-residency structure ===
VCFA has a curricular structure that provides adaptability for students through independent, guided study followed by a robust, immersive, in-person experience as a capstone for each term. Students earn their graduate degrees through self-designed study paths, flexible scheduling, and personalized attention through one-on-one guidance with a faculty mentor. The on-campus residencies at the end of each term consist of workshops, lectures, readings, panel discussions, student-teacher conferences and critiques, exhibitions, performances, and presentations of works in progress or completed."

== Presidents ==
=== Newbury Seminary (1834–1941) ===
1. Charles Adams (1834–1839)
2. Osmon Baker (1839–1844)
3. Clark T. Hinman (1844–1846)
4. Harvey Wood (1846–1847)
5. Francis Hoyt (1847)
6. Henry Sanborn Noyes (1853–1854)

=== Vermont College of Fine Arts (Since 2006 ) ===
1. Thomas Green (2006–2020)
2. Leslie Ward (2020–2023)
3. Andrew Ramsammy (2023–present)

== Notable alumni ==
=== Newbury Academy ===
- Horace W. Bailey
- George C. Chamberlain
- James M. King
- Caroline Burnham Kilgore
- Janette Hill Knox
- George McKendree Steele

=== Vermont College ===
- Linda McCartney (Associate of Arts, 1961)
- Lola Van Wagenen (Bachelor's degree, 1982)
- Roxane Gay (Bachelor's degree, 1999)

=== Vermont College of Fine Arts ===
==== Poetry ====
- Millicent Borges Accardi (1993)
- W.E. Butts (1995)
- Marcus Cafagna (1998)
- Allison Hedge Coke (1995)
- Olena Kalytiak Davis
- Alison Hawthorne Deming (1983)
- Ted Deppe
- Frank DiPalermo (2021)
- Frank Giampietro (2002)
- Pamela Harrison (1983)
- Katherine Hastings
- Patricia Spears Jones (1992)
- Nancy Lagomarsino (1984)
- Moira Linehan
- Alyce Miller (1995)
- David Mura
- Jamie Parsley
- Bill Rasmovicz
- Tim Seibles (1990)
- Betsy Sholl
- Janaka Stucky (2003)
- Jennifer K. Sweeney
- Martha M. Vertreace-Doody
- Marjorie Welish
- Valerie Wohlfeld (1993)

==== Visual Arts ====
- Gail Gregg (1998)
- Tracy Krumm (1995)
- Kapulani Landgraf
- Don Swartzentruber

==== Writing ====
- Julie Berry (2008)
- Alexandra Chasin (2002)
- Mary Clyde
- René Colato Laínez (2005)
- Carolyn Crimi ( 2000)
- Alicia Erian
- LeAnne Howe (2000)
- Darrell Kipp
- Wally Lamb
- Martine Leavitt (2003)
- Jo-Ann Mapson
- Lou Mathews (1987)
- Yamile Saied Mendez
- An Na
- Sandra Novack
- Elizabeth Powell
- Melissa Pritchard
- Kali Vanbaale
- Deborah Wiles (2003)
- Ibi Zoboi

== Notable faculty ==
=== Current ===
- Mark Cox

=== Former ===
- M. T. Anderson
- Ashley Hunt
- Jean Valentine
