= Maura Stanton =

American poet and writer (born 1946)

- Born: Evanston, Illinois, U.S.
- Occupation: Poet; writer
- Education: University of Minnesota (BA); University of Iowa (MFA)
- Spouse: Richard Cecil (m. 1972)
- Parents: Joseph Stanton; Wanda Haggard Stanton

Maura Stantonis an American poet and writer.

== Early life and education ==
Maura Stanton was born to Joseph Stanton, a salesman, and Wanda Haggard Stanton, a nurse, in Evanston, Illinois.

She received her B.A. from the University of Minnesota in 1969, and her M.F.A. in 1971 from the University of Iowa.

== Career ==
Stanton has taught at the State University of New York at Cortland (1972–1973), the University of Richmond (1973–1977), Humboldt State University (1977–1978), the University of Arizona (1978–1982), and Indiana University, since 1982.

She was also named as the distinguished author in residence at Mary Washington College for the 1981–1982 academic year.

Her first book of poetry, Snow on Snow, won the Yale Series of Younger Poets Award in 1975, and was reissued by Carnegie-Mellon University Press in 1993 as part of its contemporary classics series. Her second book, Cries of Swimmers, was published by the University of Utah Press in 1984 and was reissued by Carnegie-Mellon University Press in 1991. Her other poetry collections include Glacier Wine, Tales of the Supernatural, and Life Among the Trolls.

Other work includes Cities in the Sea, a collection of short fiction that was the winner of the Michigan Literary Fiction Award; Do Not Forsake Me, Oh My Darling, which won the Sullivan Prize, and The Country I Come From

Her work has appeared in Ploughshares.

== Awards ==
- 1982 Lawrence Foundation Prize in Fiction from Michigan Quarterly Review
- Frances Steloff Fiction Prize in 1975
- National Endowment for the Arts grants in 1974 and 1982
- 1998 Nelson Algren Award for "Ping-Pong"
- 2001 Richard Sullivan Award in Short Fiction
- 2003 Michigan Literary Fiction Award

== Personal life ==
She married Richard Cecil in 1972.

== Works ==
- Little-Known Birl of The Inner Eye (after the picture by Morris Graves), Oxford Poetry Vol III No 1 (Winter 1986)
- Through the Dark, Caffeine Destiny online
- Royal Harp, The Atlantic, October 2008
- God's Ode to Creation, Verse Daily

=== Poetry books ===
- Snow on Snow. Yale University Press. January 1, 1975.
- Cries of Swimmers. University of Utah Press. January 1, 1984. ISBN 978-0-88748-124-6.
- Tales of the Supernatural. David R Godine. October 1988. ISBN 978-0-87923-750-9.
- Glacier Wine. Carnegie Mellon Press. January 2001. ISBN 978-0-88748-340-0.
- Life Among the Trolls. Carnegie Mellon Press. April 1998. ISBN 978-0-88748-267-0.
- Immortal Sofa. University of Illinois Press. July 28, 2008. ISBN 978-0-252-07580-3.

=== Short story books ===
- THE COUNTRY I COME FROM. Milkweed Editions. October 1988. ISBN 978-0-915943-33-3.
- Do not Forsake Me, Oh My Darling. University of Notre Dame Press. November 28, 2001. ISBN 978-0-268-02556-4.
- CITIES IN THE SEA. University of Michigan Press. Fall 2003. ISBN 978-0-472-11364-4.

=== Novels ===
- Molly Companion. Bobbs-Merrill. January 1, 1977. ISBN 9780672523533.

=== Criticism ===
- A Relative Stranger, Ploughshares, Winter 1990–91
- What Keeps Us Here, Ploughshares, Winter 1992–93

=== Anthologies ===
- Jim Elledge; Susan Swartwout, eds. (1999). Real things. Indiana University Press. ISBN 978-0-253-33434-3.
- Paul Muldoon; David Lehman, eds. (2005). The Best American Poetry 2005. Simon and Schuster. ISBN 978-0-7432-5738-1.
- Jack Elliott Myers; Roger Weingarten, eds. (2005). New American Poets. David R. Godine Publisher. ISBN 978-1-56792-302-5.
