= NEOMFA =

The Northeast Ohio Master of Fine Arts Program (NEOMFA) is the nation's only consortial MFA creative writing program. The NEOMFA combines the resources of three gateway institutions within the region of Northeast Ohio: the University of Akron, Cleveland State University, and Kent State University. Through this unique arrangement, the NEOMFA exposes students to a multi-campus network of faculty, peers, and opportunities.

Students in the NEOMFA program choose a primary genre of fiction, creative nonfiction, poetry, or playwriting, but also take classes in other genres. After enrolling through their chosen gateway universities, they engage with instructors, visiting writers, and other resources across the schools. Students in the program can apply for competitive graduate assistantships and other forms of funding.

The NEOMFA program requires three years of full-time study. The final Master of Fine Arts degrees are awarded on the recommendation of the program by the respective gateway universities.

The Northeast Ohio Master of Fine Arts was established in 2005. Its mission is to educate and inspire promising creative writers in a challenging yet supportive environment.

Find more information on NEOMFA program faculty, courses, requirements, and events at https://neomfa.org/.

== Sources ==
- Poets & Writers MFA Programs Database
- AWP Guide to Academic Writing Programs
- The University of Akron MFA in Creative Writing
- Cleveland State University NEOMFA
- Kent State University Creative Writing MFA
- New Pages Graduate Creative Writing Programs
