= List of members of Aosdána =

This is a list of current and former members of Aosdána, an association of artists whose work is deemed to have made an outstanding contribution to the creative arts in Ireland.

== Details of membership ==
Membership of Aosdána is based on a system of peer nomination and election and is limited to a maximum of 250 living artists who must be resident in the Republic of Ireland or Northern Ireland for five years, although there exist exceptions where artists resident outside of Ireland are eligible "if the body of their work is deemed to significantly benefit the arts in Ireland".

== Saoi ==
Members of Aosdána may be elected by other members to receive the honour of Saoi for singular and sustained distinction in the arts. Not more than seven members can hold this honour at any one time.

== Members ==
Name	Category	Membership	Saoithe
Elaine Agnew	Music	Current member	
John Arden	Literature	Past member (deceased)	
Arthur Armstrong	Visual arts	Past member (deceased)	
Robert Ballagh	Visual arts	Past member (resigned)	
John Banville	Literature	Past member (resigned)	
Leland Bardwell	Literature	Past member (deceased)	
Aideen Barry	Visual arts	Current member	
Gerald Barry	Music	Current member	
Kevin Barry	Literature	Current member	
Sebastian Barry	Literature	Current member	
Samuel Beckett	Literature	Past member (deceased)	Saoi
Walter Beckett	Music	Past member (deceased)	
John Behan	Visual arts	Current member	
Ed Bennett	Music	Current member	
Pauline Bewick	Visual arts	Past member (deceased)	
Michael Biggs	Visual arts	Past member (deceased)	
Shane de Blacam	Architecture	Current member	
Cathal Black	Visual arts	Current member	
Basil Blackshaw	Visual arts	Past member (deceased)	
Seóirse Bodley	Music	Past member (deceased)	Saoi
Veronica Bolay	Visual arts	Past member (deceased)	
David Bolger	Choreography	Current member	
Dermot Bolger	Literature	Current member	
Pat Boran	Literature	Current member	
Brian Bourke	Visual arts	Current member	
Eva Bourke	Literature	Current member	
Fergus Bourke	Visual arts	Past member (deceased)	
Brian Boydell	Music	Past member (deceased)	
Clare Boylan	Literature	Past member (deceased)	
Charles Brady	Visual arts	Past member (deceased)	
Cecily Brennan	Visual arts	Current member	
Louis le Brocquy	Visual arts	Past member (deceased)	Saoi
Melanie le Brocquy	Visual arts	Past member (deceased)	
Jerome de Bromhead	Music	Current member	
Vincent Browne	Visual arts	Current member	
John Buckley	Music	Current member	
Linda Buckley	Music	Current member	
Michael Bulfin	Visual arts	Current member	
John Burke	Visual arts	Past member (deceased)	
Anna Burns	Literature	Current member	
Paddy Bushe	Literature	Current member	
Gerard Byrne	Visual arts	Current member	
John Byrne	Visual arts	Current member	
Michael Byrne	Visual arts	Past member (deceased)	
Moya Cannon	Literature	Current member	
Patrick Carey	Visual arts	Past member (deceased)	
Cathy Carman	Visual arts	Current member	
Marina Carr	Literature	Current member	
Ciaran Carson	Literature	Past member (deceased)	
Philip Casey	Literature	Past member (deceased)	
Eiléan Ní Chuilleanáin	Literature	Current member	Saoi
Rhona Clarke	Music	Current member	
Siobhán Cleary	Music	Current member	
Harry Clifton	Literature	Current member	
Michael Coady	Literature	Past member (deceased)	
Seán Ó Coisdealbha	Literature	Past member (deceased)	
James Coleman	Visual arts	Current member	
Pat Collins	Visual arts	Current member	
Patrick Collins	Visual arts	Past member (deceased)	Saoi
Eamon Colman	Visual arts	Current member	
Joe Comerford	Visual arts	Current member	
Micheál Ó Conghaile	Literature	Current member	
Evelyn Conlon	Literature	Current member	
Amanda Coogan	Visual arts	Current member	
Barrie Cooke	Visual arts	Past member (deceased)	
Diana Copperwhite	Visual arts	Current member	
Frank Corcoran	Music	Current member	
Maud Cotter	Visual arts	Current member	
Gary Coyle	Visual arts	Current member	
Anthony Cronin	Literature	Past member (deceased)	Saoi
Dorothy Cross	Visual arts	Current member	
William Crozier	Visual arts	Past member (deceased)	
Charles Cullen	Visual arts	Current member	
Michael Cullen	Visual arts	Past member (deceased)	
Shane Cullen	Visual Arts	Current member	
Cindy Cummings	Choreography	Current member	
Peter Cunningham	Literature	Current member	
Tony Curtis	Literature	Current member	
Ita Daly	Literature	Current member	
Margaretta D'Arcy	Literature	Past member (deceased)	
Rosaleen Davey	Visual arts	Current member	
John T. Davis	Visual arts	Current member	
Philip Davison	Literature	Current member	
Michael Davitt	Literature	Past member (deceased)	
John F. Deane	Literature	Current member	
Raymond Deane	Music	Current member	
Seamus Deane	Literature	Past member (deceased)	
Catherine Delaney	Visual arts	Current member	
Edward Delaney	Visual arts	Past member (deceased)	
Diarmuid Delargy	Visual arts	Current member	
Donnacha Dennehy	Music	Current member	
Nuala Ní Dhomhnaill	Literature	Current member	
Éilís Ní Dhuibhne	Literature	Current member	
Vivienne Dick	Visual arts	Current member	
Éilis Dillon	Literature	Past member (deceased)	
Máirtín Ó Direáin	Literature	Past member (deceased)	
Jim Doherty	Music	Current member	
Willie Doherty	Visual arts	Current member	
Neil Donnelly	Literature	Current member	
Micky Donnelly	Visual arts	Past member (deceased)	
Mary Dorcey	Literature	Current member	
Theo Dorgan	Literature	Current member	
Roger Doyle	Music	Current member	Saoi
Rita Duffy	Visual arts	Current member	
Catherine Dunne	Literature	Current member	
Paul Durcan	Literature	Past member (deceased)	
Benjamin Dwyer	Music	Current member	
Felim Egan	Visual arts	Past member (deceased)	
Anne Enright	Literature	Current member	
Conor Fallon	Visual arts	Past member (deceased)	
Peter Fallon	Literature	Current member	
Julia Ó Faoláin	Literature	Past member (deceased)	
Seán Ó Faoláin	Literature	Past member (deceased)	Saoi
Bernard Farrell	Literature	Current member	
Ciarán Farrell	Music	Current member	
Éibhlís Farrell	Music	Current member	
Micheal Farrell	Visual arts	Past member (deceased)	
Yvonne Farrell	Architecture	Current member	
Pádraic Fiacc	Literature	Past member (deceased)	
Sean Fingleton	Visual arts	Current member	
Mary FitzGerald	Visual arts	Current member	
Tom Fitzgerald	Visual arts	Current member	
Aloys Fleischman	Music	Past member (deceased)	
Críostóir Ó Floinn	Literature	Past member (deceased)	
Mannix Flynn	Literature	Current member	
Marie Foley	Visual arts	Current member	
Brian Friel	Literature	Past member (deceased)	Saoi
Martin Gale	Visual arts	Current member	
Mia Gallagher	Literature	Current member	
Patrick Galvin	Literature	Past member (deceased)	
Stephen Gardner	Music	Current member	
Carlo Gébler	Literature	Current member	
Ernest Gébler	Literature	Past member (deceased)	
Doireann Ní Ghríofa	Literature	Current member	
John Gibbons	Visual arts	Current member	
Richard Gorman	Visual arts	Current member	
Tim Goulding	Visual arts	Current member	
Patrick Graham	Visual arts	Current member	
Robert Greacen	Literature	Past member (deceased)	
Vona Groarke	Literature	Current member	
Anita Groener	Visual arts	Current member	
Ronan Guilfoyle	Music	Current member	
Patrick Hall	Visual arts	Current member	
Andrew Hamilton	Music	Current member	
Hugo Hamilton	Literature	Current member	
Gerard Hanley	Literature	Past member (deceased)	
James Hanley	Visual arts	Current member	
Marie Hanlon	Visual arts	Current member	
Alice Hanratty	Visual arts	Past member (deceased)	
Kerry Hardie	Literature	Current member	
Michael Harding	Literature	Current member	
Margo Harkin	Visual arts	Current member	
Charles Harper	Visual arts	Current member	
James Harpur	Literature	Current member	
Pat Harris	Visual arts	Current member	
Michael Hartnett	Literature	Past member (deceased)	
Francis Harvey	Literature	Past member (deceased)	
Anne Haverty	Literature	Current member	
Dermot Healy	Literature	Past member (deceased)	
Seamus Heaney	Literature	Past member (deceased)	Saoi
Frances Hegarty	Visual arts	Current member	
Brian Henderson	Visual arts	Current member	
Róisín Heneghan	Architecture	Current member	
Christine Dwyer Hickey	Literature	Current member	
Kieran Hickey	Visual arts	Past member (deceased)	
Patrick Hickey	Visual arts	Past member (deceased)	
Aidan Higgins	Literature	Past member (deceased)	
Rita Ann Higgins	Literature	Current member	
Michael Holohan	Music	Current member	
Pearse Hutchinson	Literature	Past member (deceased)	
Jaki Irvine	Visual arts	Current member	
Denis Johnston	Literature	Past member (deceased)	
Fergus Johnston	Music	Current member	
Jennifer Johnston	Literature	Past member (deceased)	
Jesse Jones	Visual arts	Current member	
Eithne Jordan	Visual arts	Current member	
John Jordan	Literature	Past member (deceased)	
Neil Jordan	Literature	Current member	
Trevor Joyce	Literature	Current member	
Rachel Joynt	Visual arts	Current member	
Michael Kane	Visual arts	Current member	
John B. Keane	Literature	Past member (deceased)	
Molly Keane	Literature	Past member (deceased)	
Claire Keegan	Literature	Current member	
John Kelly	Visual arts	Past member (deceased)	
Eddie Kennedy	Visual arts	Current member	
Adrian Kenny	Literature	Current member	
Benedict Kiely	Literature	Past member (deceased)	Saoi
Bernadette Kiely	Visual arts	Current member	
Thomas Kilroy	Literature	Past member (deceased)	
Deirdre Kinahan	Literature	Current member	
Brian King	Visual arts	Past member (deceased)	
Cecil King	Visual arts	Past member (deceased)	
John Kinsella	Music	Past member (deceased)	
Trevor Knight	Music	Current member	
Gene Lambert	Visual arts	Current member	
Sonja Landweer	Visual arts	Past member (deceased)	
Clare Langan	Visual Arts	Current member	
Mary Lavin	Literature	Past member (deceased)	Saoi
Stephen Lawlor	Visual Arts	Current member	
Ciarán Lennon	Visual arts	Current member	
Louis Lentin	Literature	Past member (deceased)	
James Liddy	Literature	Past member (deceased)	
Mary Lohan	Visual arts	Current member	
Michael Longley	Literature	Past member (deceased)	
Louise Lowe	Literature	Current member	
Donal Lunny	Music	Past member (deceased)	
Brian Lynch	Literature	Current member	
Liam Lynch	Literature	Past member (deceased)	
Martin Lynch	Literature	Current member	
Paul Lynch	Literature	Current member	
Eileen MacDonagh	Visual arts	Current member	
Tom MacIntyre	Literature	Past member (deceased)	
Bernard MacLaverty	Literature	Current member	
Bryan MacMahon	Literature	Past member (deceased)	
Eugene McCabe	Literature	Past member (deceased)	
Patrick McCabe	Literature	Current member	
Anne Madden	Visual arts	Current member	
Aodhán Madden	Literature	Past member (deceased)	
Deirdre Madden	Literature	Current member	
Brian Maguire	Visual arts	Current member	
Alice Maher	Visual arts	Current member	
Derek Mahon	Literature	Past member (deceased)	
Louis Marcus	Visual arts	Current member	
Fergus Martin	Visual arts	Current member	
Philip Martin	Music	Current member	
Hugh Maxton	Literature	Current member	
Freddie May	Music	Past member (deceased)	
Trish McAdam	Visual Arts	Current member	
Eugene McCabe	Literature	Past member (deceased)	
Patrick McCabe	Literature	Current member	
Colum McCann	Literature	Current member	
Thomas McCarthy	Literature	Current member	
Mike McCormack	Literature	Current member	
James McCreary	Visual arts	Current member	
Rosaleen McDonagh	Literature	Current member	
John McGahern	Literature	Past member (deceased)	
Medbh McGuckian	Literature	Current member	
Frank McGuinness	Literature	Current member	
Edward McGuire	Visual arts	Past member (deceased)	
Tom MacIntyre	Literature	Past member (deceased)	
James McKenna	Visual arts	Past member (deceased)	
Stephen McKenna	Visual arts	Past member (deceased)	
Willie McKeown	Visual arts	Past member (deceased)	
John McLachlan	Music	Current member	
Niall McLaughlin	Architecture	Current member	
Theo McNab	Visual arts	Past member (deceased)	
Shelley McNamara	Architecture	Current member	
Eoin McNamee	Literature	Current member	
Conor McPherson	Literature	Current member	
Seán McSweeney	Visual arts	Past member (deceased)	
Paula Meehan	Literature	Current member	
Nick Miller	Visual arts	Current member	
M. J. Molloy	Literature	Past member (deceased)	
Helen Moloney	Visual arts	Past member (deceased)	
Alfonso Monreal Lopez	Visual arts	Current member	
John Montague	Literature	Past member (deceased)	
Brian Moore	Literature	Past member (deceased)	
George Morrison	Visual arts	Past member (deceased)	Saoi
Mary Morrissy	Literature	Current member	
Paul Mosse	Visual arts	Current member	
Gina Moxley	Literature	Current member	
Liam Ó Muirthile	Literature	Past member (deceased)	
Michael Mulcahy	Visual arts	Current member	
Paul Muldoon	Literature	Current member	Saoi
Carolyn Mulholland	Visual arts	Current member	
Val Mulkerns	Literature	Past member (deceased)	
Janet Mullarney	Visual arts	Past member (deceased)	
Gráinne Mulvey	Music	Current member	
Valerie Mulvin	Architecture	Current member	
Gerry Murphy	Literature	Current member	
Jimmy Murphy	Literature	Current member	
Pat Murphy	Visual arts	Current member	
Richard Murphy	Literature	Past member (deceased)	
Tom Murphy	Literature	Past member (deceased)	Saoi
Joe Steve Ó Neachtain	Literature	Past member (deceased)	
John Nee	Literature	Current member	
Christopher Nolan	Literature	Past member (deceased)	
Isabel Nolan	Visual Arts	Current member	
Jim Nolan	Literature	Current member	
Edna O'Brien	Literature	Past member (deceased)	Saoi
Julie O'Callaghan	Literature	Current member	
Eilis O'Connell	Visual arts	Current member	
Conleth O'Connor	Literature	Past member (deceased)	
Kevin O'Connell	Music	Current member	
Joseph O'Connor	Literature	Current member	
Ulick O'Connor	Literature	Past member (deceased)	
Mick O'Dea	Visual arts	Current member	
Mary O'Donnell	Literature	Current member	
Peadar O'Donnell	Literature	Past member (deceased)	
Sheila O'Donnell	Architecture	Current member	
Hughie O'Donoghue	Visual arts	Current member	
Gwen O'Dowd	Visual arts	Current member	
Ciaran O'Driscoll	Literature	Current member	
Dennis O'Driscoll	Literature	Past member (deceased)	
Liam O'Flaherty	Literature	Past member (deceased)	
Desmond O'Grady	Literature	Past member (deceased)	
Mairead O'hEocha	Visual arts	Current member	
Alanna O'Kelly	Visual arts	Current member	
Donal O'Kelly	Literature	Past member (resigned)	
Jane O’Leary	Music	Current member	
Michael O'Loughlin	Literature	Current member	
Mary O'Malley	Literature	Current member	
Tony O'Malley	Visual arts	Past member (deceased)	Saoi
Geraldine O'Neill	Visual arts	Current member	
Geraldine O'Reilly	Visual arts	Current member	
Sean O'Reilly	Literature	Current member	
Micheal O'Siadhail	Literature	Current member	
Patrick O'Sullivan	Visual arts	Past member (deceased)	
Tom de Paor	Architecture	Current member	
Glenn Patterson	Literature	Current member	
Colman Pearce	Music	Current member	
Tommy Peoples	Music	Past member (deceased)	
Janet Pierce	Visual arts	Current member	
James Plunkett	Literature	Past member (deceased)	
Mary Farl Powers	Visual arts	Past member (deceased)	
Kathy Prendergast	Visual arts	Current member	
Patrick Pye	Visual arts	Past member (deceased)	
Michael Quane	Visual arts	Current member	
Fiona Quilligan	Choreography	Current member	
Bob Quinn	Visual arts	Current member	
Yann Renard Goulet	Visual arts	Past member (deceased)	
Arthur Riordan	Literature	Current member	
Tim Robinson	Literature	Past member (deceased)	
Billy Roche	Literature	Current member	
Liz Roche	Choreography	Current member	
Vivienne Roche	Visual arts	Current member	
Nigel Rolfe	Visual arts	Current member	
Gabriel Rosenstock	Literature	Past member (deceased)	
Máire Mhac an tSaoi	Literature	Past member (resigned)	
James Scanlon	Visual arts	Current member	
John Scott	Choreography	Current member	
Patrick Scott	Visual arts	Past member (deceased)	Saoi
Maurice Scully	Literature	Past member (deceased)	
Seán Scully	Visual arts	Current member	
Cathal Ó Searcaigh	Literature	Current member	
Dermot Seymour	Visual arts	Current member	
David Shaw-Smith	Visual arts	Past member (deceased)	
Peter Sheridan	Literature	Current member	
Noel Sheridan	Visual arts	Past member (deceased)	
John Shinnors	Visual arts	Current member	
James Simmons	Literature	Past member (deceased)	
Maria Simonds-Gooding	Visual arts	Current member	
Peter Sirr	Literature	Current member	
John Noel Smith	Visual arts	Current member	
Paul Smith	Literature	Past member (deceased)	
Michael Smith	Literature	Past member (deceased)	
Gerard Smyth	Literature	Current member	
Sydney Bernard Smith	Literature	Past member (deceased)	
Camille Souter	Visual arts	Past member (deceased)	Saoi
Amelia Stein	Visual arts	Current member	
Louis Stewart	Music	Past member (deceased)	
Eithne Strong	Literature	Past member (deceased)	
Francis Stuart	Literature	Past member (deceased)	Saoi
Imogen Stuart	Visual arts	Past member (deceased)	Saoi
Eric Sweeney	Music	Past member (deceased)	
Matthew Sweeney	Literature	Past member (deceased)	
Anne Tallentire	Visual arts	Current member	
Donald Teskey	Visual arts	Current member	
Colm Tóibín	Literature	Current member	
William Trevor	Literature	Past member (deceased)	Saoi
Rod Tuach	Visual arts	Current member	
Eoghan Ó Tuairisc	Literature	Past member (deceased)	
John Tuomey	Architecture	Current member	
Charles Tyrrell	Visual arts	Current member	
Dáirine Vanston	Visual arts	Past member (deceased)	
Terence de Vere White	Literature	Past member (deceased)	
Gerard Victory	Music	Past member (deceased)	
Michael Viney	Literature	Past member (deceased)	
Kevin Volans	Music	Current member	
Corban Walker	Visual arts	Current member	
Joe Walker	Visual arts	Current member	
Mervyn Wall	Literature	Past member (deceased)	
Samuel Walsh	Visual arts	Current member	
Jennifer Walshe	Music	Current member	
Barbara Warren	Visual arts	Past member (deceased)	
Michael Warren	Visual arts	Current member	
Grace Weir	Visual arts	Current member	
Alexandra Wejchert	Visual arts	Past member (deceased)	
Margaret Irwin West	Visual Arts	Current member	
Bill Whelan	Music	Current member	
Ian Wilson	Music	Current member	
James Wilson	Music	Past member (deceased)	
Macdara Woods	Literature	Past member (deceased)	
Vincent Woods	Literature	Current member	
Daphne Wright	Visual arts	Current member	
Enda Wyley	Literature	Current member	
Nancy Wynne-Jones	Visual arts	Past member (deceased)	
Anne Yeats	Visual arts	Past member (deceased)	
