= The Great Book of Ireland =

Collection of Irish art and poetry

The Great Book of Ireland (Irish: Leabhar Mór na hÉireann), a gallery and anthology of modern Irish art and poetry, was a project which began in 1989. It has been described as "Ireland’s modern-day Book of Kells". The book was published in 1991, and in January 2013 it was acquired by University College Cork for $1 million.

== Description ==
A huge volume of 250 pages of (510 by 360 by 110 millimetres (20.1 in × 14.2 in × 4.3 in)), the book brings together the work of 121 artists, 143 poets and 9 composers who painted, drew and wrote directly on the vellum. Calligraphy by Denis Brown to each opening serves to unify the book, which was bound in elm by A.G. Cains. Eamonn Martin and Gene Lambert of Mills Trust and Theo Dorgan of Poetry Ireland initiated the project in 1989.

All the contributors worked directly onto the large vellum pages, handmade by Joe Katz, and their work was unified by a calligrapher, Denis Brown, aided by design consultant Trevor Scott S.D.I. The Book was bound by Anthony Cains and is housed in a box by Eric Pearce with a silver clasp by Brian Clarke.

The Book was a joint venture between Clashganna Mills Trust Ltd and Poetry Ireland Ltd. Business manager for the project was Eamonn Martin, and the editors were Theo Dorgan and Gene Lambert.

Clashganna Mills Trust is a charity that aims at dignity through independent living for people with disabilities. Poetry Ireland wished to build a national poetry centre with theatre and library facilities. Both organisations, while receiving public funds, are committed to a large measure of self-financing. Both recognised at an early stage the need for a bold, imaginative fundraising venture, which would provide a measure of much-needed capital.

When Eamonn Martin and Gene Lambert of Clashganna Mills met Theo Dorgan of Poetry Ireland in March 1989, what all had in mind was a project that would raise substantial funds while at the same time being a venture worthwhile in itself. Out of that meeting came the first tentative idea of the Great Book. Clashganna had previously produced a book, The Land of Punt, with paintings by Lambert and poems by Paul Durcan. This new book, however, would be very different.

The original idea was to create a handmade book of poems, on vellum, written and illustrated by a single artist. Within days, this had developed into a book with images by a single artist, in which the poems, perhaps 50 in all, would be written in their own hand by the contributing poets.

A significant shift came with the proposal that the book should be a dialogue between the communities of poets and artists in Ireland. Fifty artists would contribute - their images meeting the work of 50 poets.

Mushrooming as it went, the Book would eventually incorporate the direct contributions of 140 poets, 120 artists, composers, and a calligrapher.

The technical problems were daunting enough in themselves. A pigment had to be found which would be flexible enough to accommodate a range of working practices, which swept from a delicate watercolour technique to something verging on impasto. Vellum had to be found in sufficient quantities and when a source in Ireland was identified, it promptly went into liquidation.

However, a management buyout by Joe Katz put Vellum and Parchment Works Celbridge back in operation. Vellum these days is normally supplied for orchestral tympani heads. Sheets of the nature required for the Book had to be painstakingly and rigorously prepared by hand -and then artists had to face the nightmare of working, one chance only, on an unfamiliar surface, a living material which stretched and shrank as it was wet or dry, a subtly uneven surface containing minute amounts of natural oils.

The poets, scratching away with dip-pens on a surface pitted with microscopic bumps and hollows, found themselves writing with unfamiliar or half-forgotten implements on a material light years away from bleached, flat paper. The whole skin was used in each case, resulting in a book half as big as The Book of Kells again.

As news of the Book began to filter out, artists and poets came forward with unparalleled generosity to make their contributions.

Meanwhile, parallel to the creative work, a great deal of financial ingenuity emerged. The original budget estimate was £25,000; this was to double, quadruple, double again as the full scope of the enterprise emerged.

Money and help came from sources including: • An overdraft at the AIB; • A grant and an interest-free loan from early backers, Dublin 1991 European City of Culture; • A travel grant from the Swedish Embassy; • A large interest free loan and a donation of £10,000 from Ulster bank which came when the Book, almost complete, seemed permanently stalled. • Total Communications came forward with assistance in the field of marketing and sponsorship. • SKC offered financial and taxation advice.

There were times when vellum was being bought one sheet at a time, but somehow the project faltered ahead. Each page demanded to be treated as a totality - image, poem and calligraphy working together. Trevor Scott S.D.I. joined the team as design consultant, followed by calligrapher Denis Brown: these would provide the flow of continuity throughout the Book. Working to the supervision of Scott, Brown provided the endlessly inventive scripts which lace through the Book.

Anthony Cains, a gifted bookmaker, is the Director of Conservation in Trinity College Dublin. A world authority in his craft, Cains would be the bookmaker. Master craftsman Eric Pearce would make the case for the book, and the display case too; Brian Clarke, jeweller, would provide the silver clasp for the box; the box itself, and the display case, in a nice touch, would be of wood from an elm planted by W.B. Yeats at Thoor Ballylee, with insets of Irish bog oak.

Cains had been hoarding a Sardinian goatskin -a beautiful naturally cured skin acquired 25 years before when he worked on the restoration of manuscripts in the Florentine libraries after the great floods. This would be given to cover the Book.

Crann announced the news that the Thoor Ballylee elms had the Dutch disease - and made a suggestion that one might be used. Coillte identified a tree where the heartwood was intact and with the assistance of Ireland West Tourism a tree was procured and dispatched by Coillte to its kiln facilities at Dundrum for drying.

John Montague - in Paris to read from his work - persuaded Samuel Beckett to make his contribution.

Gandon Productions, on commission from RTÉ, came forward with a proposal for a documentary on the making of the Book, to be directed by Tony Barry.

Visiting poets from the USSR, USA, Romania, Czechoslovakia, the Caribbean and Italy were invited to contribute, their participation serving to underline the essentially cosmopolitan nature of Irish art and writing today.

From Britain, the Poet Laureate, Ted Hughes, contributed two poems in tribute to the Professor of Poetry at Oxford, Seamus Heaney.

The Great Book of Ireland was accepted by the Dublin 1991 European City of Culture Committee as a central project, because it reflects the true wealth of the arts in Ireland, which lies in the artists themselves.

In recognition of all that he had done for the community of artists in Ireland, the then Taoiseach, Charles J. Haughey TD, was invited to become Patron of the Great Book of Ireland.

The artists, poets and composers whose work is contained in the Great Book of Ireland contributed their work free of charge.

== Contributors ==
=== Poets ===
- Chris Agee
- Bella Akhmadulina
- Leland Bardwell
- Sebastian Barry
- Tony Barry
- Samuel Beckett
- Sara Berkeley
- Eavan Boland
- Dermot Bolger
- Pat Boran
- Eva Bourke
- Deirdre Brennan
- Rory Brennan
- Heather Brett
- Sam Burnside
- Paddy Bushe
- Kevin Byrne
- Moya Cannon
- Ciaran Carson
- Philip Casey
- Sean Clarkin
- Michael Coady
- Mael Coll Rua
- Ciaran Cosgrove
- Patrick Cotter
- Anthony Cronin
- Tony Curtis
- Padraig J. Daly
- Michael Davitt)
- Gerald Dawe
- John F. Deane
- Seamus Deane
- Patrick Deeley
- Patrick Deeley
- Greg Delanty
- Mary Dorcey
- Theo Dorgan
- Sean Dunne
- Paul Durcan
- Andrew Elliott
- John Ennis
- Peter Fallon
- Padraic Fiacc
- Gabriel Fitzmaurice
- Carolyn Forche
- Frank Galligan
- Patrick Galvin
- Anthony Glavin
- Damian Gorman
- Robert Greacen
- Gerry Greig
- Eamonn Grennan
- Davoren Hanna
- Jack Hanna
- Anne Hartigan
- Michael Hartnett
- Seamus Heaney
- Rita Ann Higgins
- Michael D. Higgins
- Seamus Hogan
- Miroslav Holub
- Ted Hughes
- Mark Hutcheson
- Pearse Hutchinson
- Valentin Iremonger
- Biddy Jenkinson
- Fred Johnston
- John Kelly
- Anne Kennedy
- Brendan Kennelly
- Thomas Kinsella
- Jessie Lendennie
- Michael Longley
- Mario Luzi
- Brian Lynch
- Sean Lysaght
- Derek Mahon
- E.A. Markham
- Hugh Maxton
- James J. McAuley
- Joan McBreen
- Thomas McCarthy
- Gearailt Mac Eoin
- Hugh McFadden
- Roy McFadden
- Medbh McGuckian
- Tom McIntyre
- Maire Mhac an tSaoi
- Tomas Mac Siomoin
- Paula Meehan
- John Montague
- Paul Muldoon
- Aidan Murphy
- Gerry Murphy
- Richard Murphy
- Eilean Ni Chuilleanain
- Nuala Ni Dhomhnaill
- Aine Ni Ghlinn
- Christopher Nolan
- Julie O'Callaghan
- Clairr O'Connor
- Conleth O'Connor
- Ulick O'Connor
- Sean O Curraoin
- Aodh O Domhnaill
- Mary O'Donnell
- Gregory O'Donoghue
- Robert O'Donoghue
- Ciaran O'Driscoll
- Dennis O'Driscoll
- Desmond O'Grady
- John O'Leary
- Michael O'Loughlin
- Mary O'Malley
- Liam O Muirthile
- Micheal O Ruairc
- Cathal Ó Searcaigh
- Micheal O'Siadhail
- Padraig O Snodaigh
- Sean O Tuama
- Frank Ormsby
- Louis de Paor
- Basil Payne
- Patrick Ramsey
- Gabriel Rosenstock
- Richard Ryan
- James Simmons
- Jo Slade
- Damian Smith
- Kevin Smith
- Michael Smith
- Gerard Smyth
- Eithne Strong
- Francis Stuart
- Matthew Sweeney
- Grete Tartler
- Derek Walcott
- Gail Walker
- Heathcote Williams
- Macdara Woods

=== Artists ===
- Sophie Aghajanian
- Arthur Armstrong
- Robert Armstrong
- Michael Ashur
- Yehuda Bacon
- Robert Ballagh
- Marie Barrett
- John Behan
- Carmel Benson
- Pauline Bewick
- Basil Blackshaw
- Veronica Bolay
- Brian Bourke
- Charles Brady
- Cecily Brennan
- Louis le Brocquy
- Vincent Browne
- Campbell Bruce
- Michael Coleman
- Cliff Colley
- Patrick Collins
- Peter Collis
- Barrie Cooke
- David Crone
- Dorothy Cross
- Charles Cullen
- Michael Cullen
- Gerald Davis
- Daniel Day-Lewis
- Diarmuid Delargy
- Gerry Devlin
- Mary Donnelly
- Gabby Dowling
- Grainne Dowling
- Rita Duffy
- Felim Egan
- Conor Fallon
- Michael Farrel
- Michael Farrell
- Matilda Faulkner
- Sean Fingleton
- Mary Fitzgerald
- T.P. Flanagan
- Andrew Folan
- Marie Foley
- Paul Funge
- Martin Gale
- Graham Gingles
- Tim Goulding
- Patrick Graham
- Anita Groener
- Patrick Hall
- Jo Hanly
- Alice Hanratty
- Charlie Harper
- Patrick Hickey
- Patricia Hurl
- Eithne Jordan
- Michael Kane
- Finbar Kelly
- John Kelly
- Brian King
- Peter Knuttel
- Gene Lambert
- Sonja Landweer
- Anne Madden
- Brian Maguire
- Berni Markey
- Anna McCleod
- James McKenna
- Patricia McKenna
- Theresa McKenna
- Theo McNab
- Margaret McNamidhe
- Sean McSweeney
- Alfonso Monreal
- John Moore
- Paul Mosse
- Michael Mulcahy
- Carolyn Mulholland
- Cóilín Murray
- Pat Murphy
- Deirdre O'Connel
- Eilis O'Connell
- Mick O'Dea
- Eamonn O'Doherty
- Gwen O'Dowd
- Alanna O'Kelly
- Antóin O Máille
- Jane O'Malley
- Tony O'Malley
- Danny Osborne
- Mick O'Sullivan
- George Potter
- Mary Farl Powers
- Kathy Prendergast
- Patrick Pye
- Nigel Rolfe
- Patrick Scott
- Trevor Scott
- Una Sealy
- Neil Shawcross
- Maria Simmonds Gooding
- John Noel Smith
- Paki Smith
- Rob Smith
- Jackie Stanley
- Imogen Stuart
- Donald Teskey
- Markus Thonett
- Charles Tyrell
- Derek Walcott
- Lorcan Walsh
- Martin Wedge
- Oliver Whelan
- Charlie Whisker
- Chris Wilson
- Nancy Wynne-Jones

=== Composers ===
- Gerald Barry
- Seóirse Bodley
- Brian Boydell
- John Buckley
- Roger Doyle
- John Kinsella
- Jim Lockhart
- Jane O'Leary
- Eric Sweeney

== Film and photographic records ==
RTÉ, the national broadcasting service, commissioned a 54-minute film from Gandon Productions Ltd., to ensure that the work would be properly documented. Produced by Niall McCarthy and directed by Tony Barry, Pages for the Great Book of Ireland, with a specially commissioned soundtrack by Jim Lockhart, was broadcast on 18 March 1990. Amelia Stein recorded the first marks made for the Book, in a series of still photographs made when John Montague and Seamus Heaney inscribed their poems on 11 June 1989. Bill Doyle later photographed a typical working session.

== Critical engagement ==
In 2020, James Lawlor completed a Ph.D on the Great Book of Ireland. His thesis ‘A Cultural History of the Great Book of Ireland’ was supervised through the School of English University College Cork. It was the first major in-depth study of the Great Book of Ireland.
