= Gerald Davis (Irish artist) =

- Gerald Davis dressed as Leopold Bloom
- Born: 1938; Dublin, Ireland
- Died: 2005 (aged 66–67)
- Known for: painter, Wrtiter

Gerald Davis (1938 – 2005) was one of Ireland's leading semi-abstract artists. He was also an art gallery owner, critic, and Joycean scholar. He was a prominent member of the Jewish community in Ireland. He wrote for Irish national newspapers and broadcast on radio and television, where he reported on the arts and Irish Jewish life.

== Career ==
Davis' grandparents were Lithuanian Jews. His grandfather came to Ireland in the 1880s. Davis was born in Dublin in 1938, the only child of Sydney and Doris Davis. His family owned a business on Capel Street. Davis had his first solo show in 1962. He had more than 150 solo exhibitions, and his work was also shown in major group exhibitions. His paintings are in many important public and private exhibitions. The Arts Council of Ireland awarded him with a Douglas Hyde Gold Medal for historical painting in 1977.

In 1970 Davis opened his own art gallery in Capel Street, where he pioneered young Irish artists and craft-workers, several of whom went on to become Ireland's leading artists. The gallery showed new and established artists, ceramic, textiles, painting and sculpture. Well-known artists who had their early shows in the Davis Gallery include Charlie Harper, John Kelly, Edward Delaney, John Devlin, and Martin Gale. Cearbhall Ó Dálaigh opened the gallery's first exhibition, which showed drawings by Edward Delaney. In 1995 President Mary Robinson opened a twenty-fifth anniversary exhibition of work by 25 artists.

In Dublin, Davis was well known for masquerading as Leopold Bloom, the main character of Ulysses, and leading Bloomsday parades. In 1977 Davis created an exhibition based on Ulysses called "Paintings for Bloomsday". The exhibition opened on Bloomsday, 16 June, in a gallery located on Howth Head, the setting of the soliloquy that ends Ulysses. Davis dressed as Leopold Bloom in an Edwardian suit and bowler hat in order to publicise and celebrate the event. His appearance caught the attention of the media. After this, Davis appeared as Leopold Bloom at other Bloomsdays and at events in other countries.

Davis was also a strong supporter of young musicians. He founded his own record company, LIVIA Records, in the late 1970s. He produced albums for many of the most distinguished Irish jazz musicians, poets, and actors. Davis lectured on Irish art and literature in Australia, Europe and the US, focusing on James Joyce and Samuel Beckett.

== Death ==
Davis was diagnosed with laryngeal cancer in 2003 and died in 2005.
