= Great Book (disambiguation) =

A Great Book is another word for a classic or noteworthy book

Great Book may also refer to:

- Western canon, works considered to be among the Great Books
- The Great Book of Ireland, an anthology of modern Irish art and Poetry
- Great Books (TV program), a documentary series that aired on The Learning Channel
- Great Books of the Western World, a collection of classic books published by Encyclopeædia Britannica
