= Stephen Roger Powers =

American poet, writer, and comedian (born 1974)

Stephen Powers
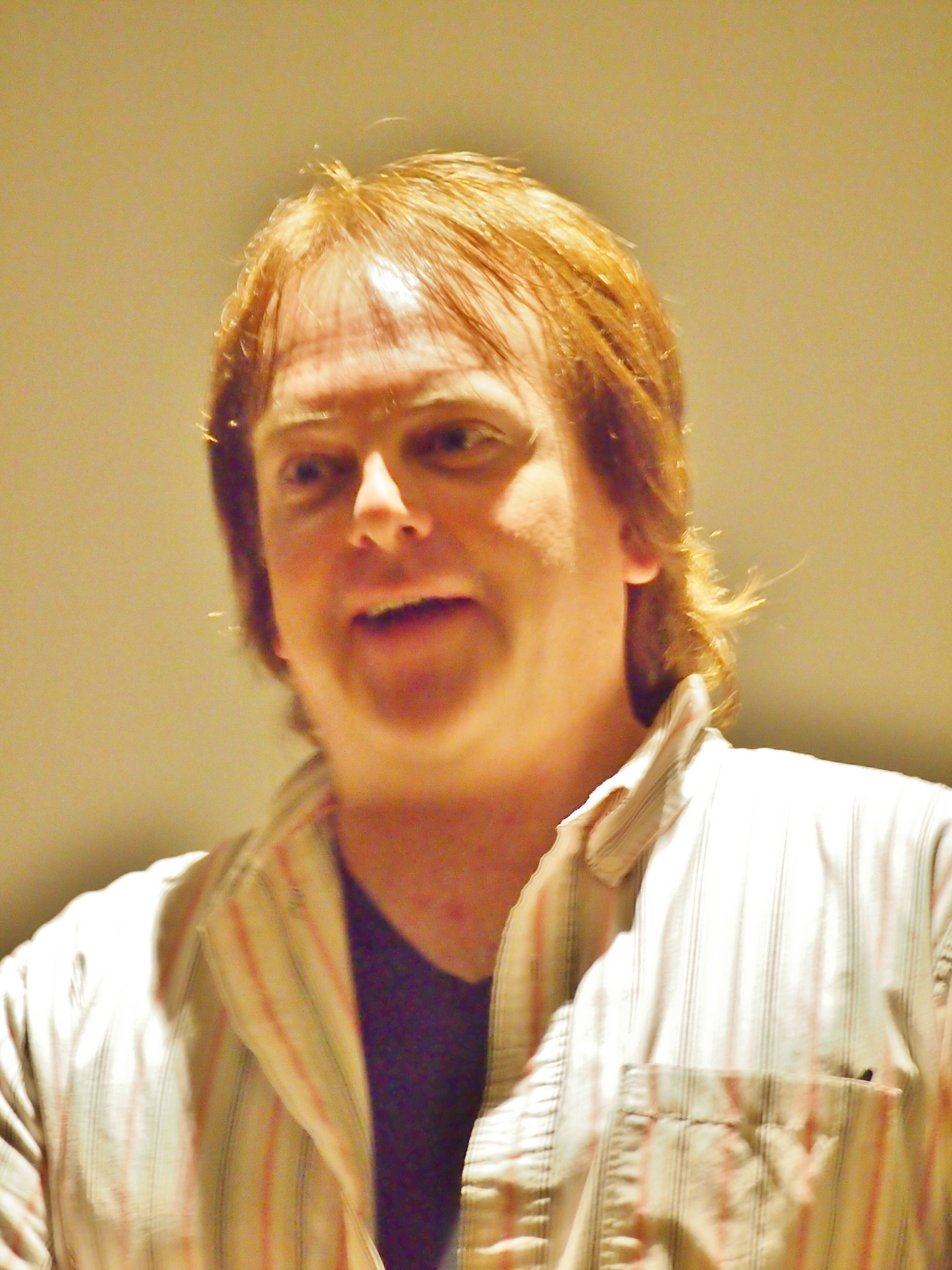
- reading at Miller Cabin poetry series, Washington, D.C.
- Born: May 19, 1974 (age 52); Madison, Wisconsin
- Occupations: Professor; Comic
- Writing career
- Genre: Poetry

Stephen Roger Powers (born May 19, 1974) is an American poet, writer, and comedian. He is currently Professor of English at Gordon State College (Georgia).

== Biography ==
Stephen Roger Powers was born in Madison, Wisconsin. He graduated from University of Wisconsin–Milwaukee, with a PhD.

He is the author of The Follower's Tale, a collection of bluegrass-inspired lyric and narrative poems about country music icon Dolly Parton and her theme park, Dollywood. The Follower's Tale was published by Salmon Poetry in 2009. Powers has also published numerous poems and short stories in a variety of journals and anthologies, including Shenandoah (magazine), Smartish Pace, and Red, White, and Blues: Poets on the Promise of America (University of Iowa Press). He has received two Pushcart Prize nominations for his fiction and poetry, and he has presented his work and his scholarship at the Modern Language Association (MLA), the Association of Writers & Writing Programs (AWP), and on Wisconsin Public Radio's Hotel Milwaukee program. On August 23, 2003, a sample of Powers' Hotel Milwaukee appearance was played just before "The National Anthem" during a Radiohead concert at Alpine Valley in East Troy, WI. Powers' voice can be heard on numerous bootleg recordings of the concert.

== The Follower's Tale ==
Powers began work on The Follower's Tale in the fall of 2000 while a PhD student in the graduate creative writing program at the University of Wisconsin–Milwaukee. The working title of the project was Chasing Dolly until it was changed to The Follower's Tale upon completion of the final draft in 2007. Salmon Poetry published the book in October 2009 with cover art by Dublin artist Maura Harmon. R. T. Smith, editor of Shenandoah, calls the book a "whirlwind of a collection," and Dolly Parton offers an endorsement on the back cover. An early version of The Follower's Tale, much different from the published version, was named a semi-finalist for the Verse Prize in 2004 and was included in Powers' doctoral dissertation, a creative study of the relationship between performance and text entitled Kill Trevor Austen!. On October 1, 2009, to mark the publication of The Follower's Tale, Powers appeared at an All-Ireland Poetry Day reading with Irish poets Gerry Hanberry, Celeste Auge, and Jean Kavanagh at the Ennistymon Courthouse Gallery in Ennistymon, Ireland.

== Comedy ==
From 2000-2008, Powers performed as a Milwaukee-based stand-up comedian using the stage name Trevor Austen. He appeared at clubs and casinos throughout the Midwest. Powers' last stand-up performance was in Wisconsin in the summer of 2008, when he retired the Trevor Austen persona to focus on his poetry and fiction writing. The Trevor Austen act centered on Powers' real-life hearing impairment. Even though he performed at several charity benefits he also drew some criticism from advocates of the deaf for playing up his disability for comedic effect instead of education and awareness. Powers, under the Austen name, was featured in Milwaukee Magazine and appeared on the cover of M Magazine in June 2004 with Tyler Kroll and Mel Miskimen, two other Milwaukee-area comedians.
