= Adam Hughes (poet) =

American poet (born 1982)

- Born: August 2, 1982 (age 44)

Adam Hughes (born August 2, 1982) is an American poet.

== Published works ==
Hughes has published five full-length poetry collections - most recently Pluck from BOA Editions - and a non-fiction book about American rugby.

His poetry is characterized by wrestling with religious themes, family, history, and humor.

Hughes received his MFA in Creative Writing from Randolph College in 2020.

His debut non-fiction book, This Is Rugby, was self-published in 2022. It tells the story of American rugby culture and is the product of over 500 interviews with rugby clubs, individuals, and organizations from all of the United States.

== Personal life ==
Hughes was born and raised in Lancaster, Ohio. He now lives in Bedford, Virginia with his wife and children. He has worked as a pastor, a college professor, and a high school English teacher. Additionally, he plays rugby and was the coach and president at Blackwater Rugby Football Club in Lynchburg, Virginia.

== Bibliography ==
- Petrichor. 2010. NYQ Books (a division of the New York Quarterly). ISBN 978-1935520351
- Uttering the Holy. 2012. NYQ Books. ISBN 978-1935520610
- Allow the Stars to Catch Me When I Rise. 2017. Salmon Poetry. ISBN 978-1910669655
- Deep Cries Out to Deep. 2017. Kelsay Books. ISBN 978-1947465121
- This Is Rugby. 2022. Self-Published. ISBN 979-8841864165
- Pluck. 2025. BOA Editions. ISBN 978-1960145741
