= Stephen Powers (disambiguation) =

Stephen Powers may refer to:

- Stephen Powers (1840–1904), American journalist, ethnographer, and historian
- Stephen Roger Powers (born 1974), American poet, and comic
- Stephen Powers (artist) (born 1968), American artist
- Steve Powers (born 1934), American musician, journalist and teacher
- Steve Powers (baseball), University of Arizona baseball player
