= Margaret Irwin =

Margaret Irwin may refer to:

- Margaret Irwin (novelist) (1889–1967), English historical novelist
- Margaret Irwin (trade unionist) (1858–1940), Scottish suffragist and labour activist
- Margaret Irwin West (b. 1926), Irish artist
