= Camolin, County Wexford =

Village in County Wexford, Ireland

Camolin Cam Eolaing
- Village
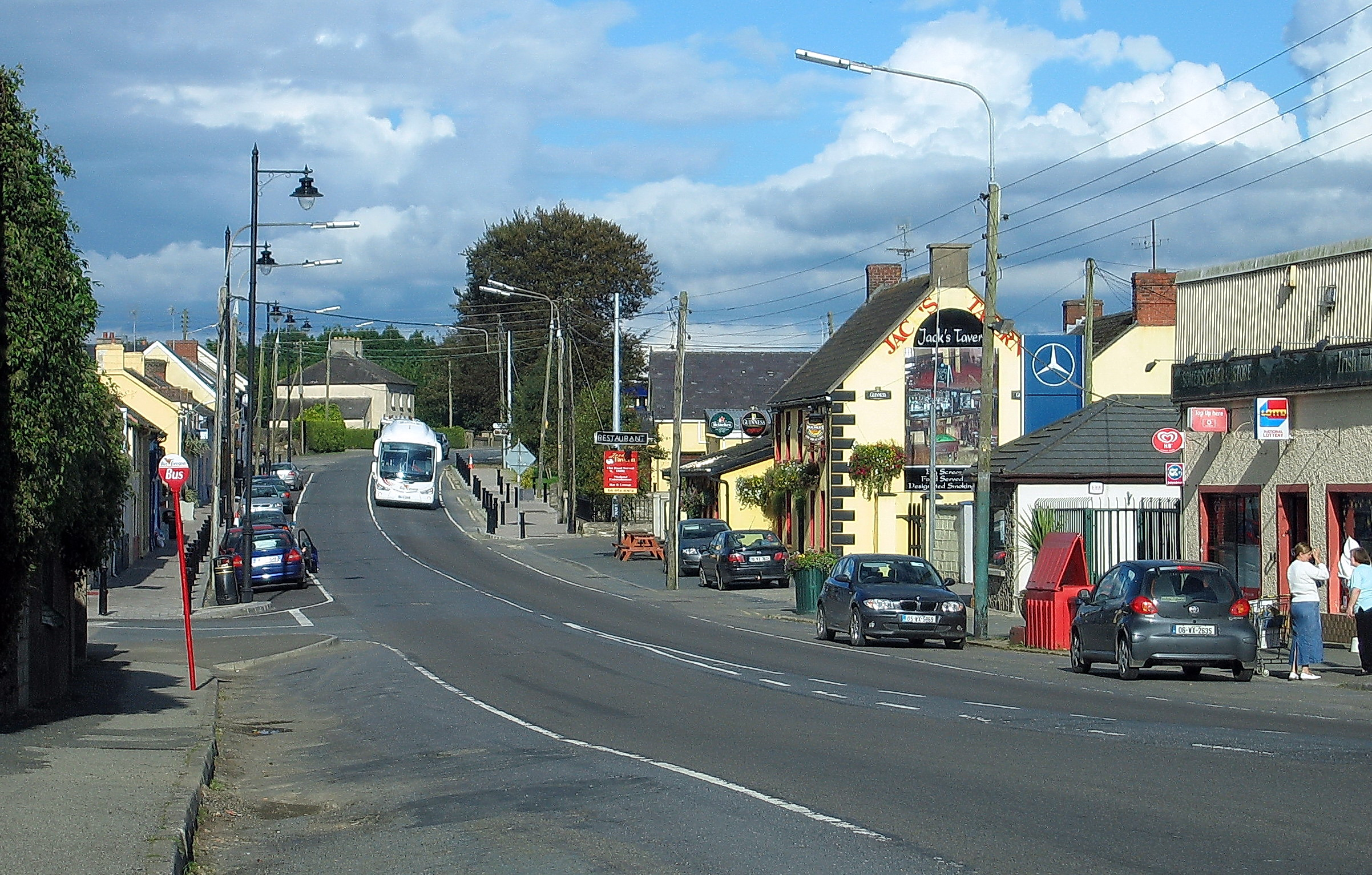
- The R772 as Main Street, Camolin

- Location in Ireland
- Coordinates: 52°36′54″N 6°25′30″W
- Country: Ireland
- Province: Leinster
- County: County Wexford

Area
  - Total: 1.39 km^{2} (0.54 sq mi)
- Elevation: 41 m (135 ft)

Population (2016)
  - Total: 415
  - Density: 299/km^{2} (773/sq mi)
- Time zone: UTC+0 (WET)
  - Summer (DST): UTC-1 (IST (WEST))
- Irish Grid Reference: T065527

Camolin (Irish: Cam Eolaing) is a village in County Wexford in Ireland, situated in the valley of the River Bann on the R772 regional road 6 km (3.7 mi) northeast of Ferns. As of the 2016 census, the village had a population of 415 people.

== Transport ==
Camolin railway station opened on 1 November 1867, but finally closed on 30 March 1964.

== Sport ==
The community field, situated on the Main Street, is used by two sporting clubs; Camolin Celtic AFC and St. Patrick's GAA Club.

Camolin Celtic cater for both men's and ladies' teams. They field men's and boys' teams from Under-8 level to senior, and ladies' teams at Under-10, Under-14 and senior levels.

St. Patrick's GAA club field both hurling and Gaelic football teams from Under-8 to Senior level.

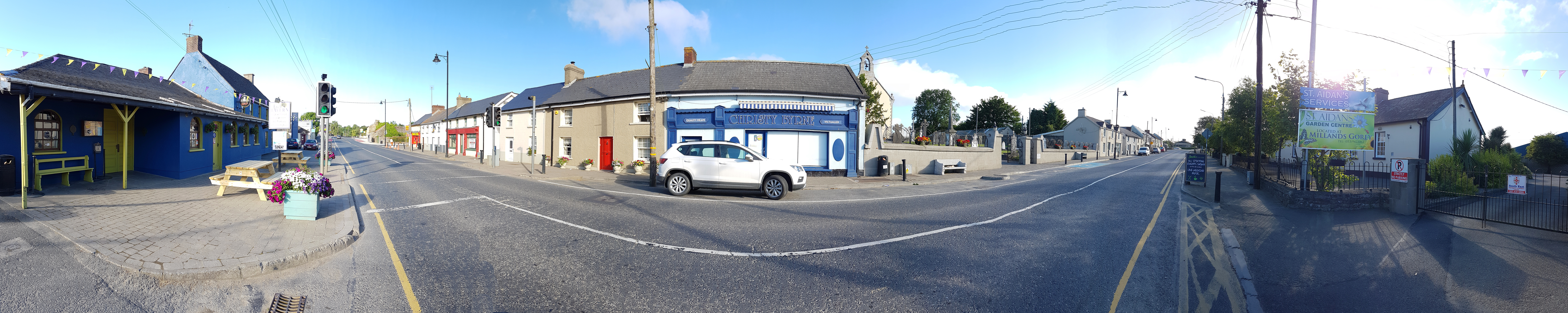
Camolin's main street

== People ==
- Conleth O'Connor (1947–1993), poet

== See also ==
- List of towns and villages in Ireland
