= Hugh Maxton =

Irish poet and academic

- Born: William John McCormack; 1947 (age 78–79); Aughrim, County Wicklow, Ireland
- Occupations: Poet, Literary critic

Academic background
- Education: Trinity College Dublin; Ulster University
- Thesis: Joseph Sheridan Le Fanu and the fiction of the Anglo-Irish ascendancy in the nineteenth century (1974)

Academic work
- Discipline: Literature
- Sub-discipline: Irish literature
- Institutions: Ulster University. University of Leeds, Goldsmiths, University of London

Hugh Maxton (born 1947), alias W. J. McCormack, is an Irish poet and academic.

== Biography ==
William (Bill) John McCormack was born near Aughrim, County Wicklow in 1947. His parents were Irene (née King) and Charles Elliott McCormack. His father died from a heart attack when William was 13 years old. He attended Rathgar (Methodist) National School and won a scholarship to Wesley College, Dublin (1959–65). He proceeded to Trinity College Dublin from which he graduated with a BA (1971). He was awarded a D.Phil. by the New University of Ulster (1974). He lectured both at the Coleraine and Magee College campuses of that university before proceeding to the University of Leeds. He was awarded a personal chair in Literary History at Goldsmiths, University of London in 1995.

== Writing ==
As a poet, he adopted the name Hugh Maxton, supposedly from the Scottish socialist James Maxton. He has written a large number of books of poetry as well as translations from Hungarian and German.

As a literary critic, he has written using his registered name William J. McCracken. His specialism is 19th- and 20th-century Irish literature.

== Works ==
=== Poetry ===
- Poems 2000-2005 (Dublin: Carysfort Press 2005).
- Same Bridge Perhaps, and Other Fugitive Poems with a postface by Eiléan Ní Chuilleanáin (Dublin: Duras Press 2013).
- Gubu Roi: Poems and Satires (Belfast: Lagan Press 2000), 90pp.
- The Engraved Passion: New and Selected Poems 1970-1991 (Dublin: Dedalus 1992), 116pp.
- The Puzzle Tree Ascendant (Dublin: Dedalus 1988).
- At the Protestant Museum (Dublin: Dolmen 1986), 53pp.
- Passage (with surviving poems) (Bradford on Avon: q. pub. [1985]), 30pp.
- Swift Mail (1992).
- 6 Snapdragons (Clemson, S. Carolina: H. Maxton 1985), 12pp. [400 copies].
- Jubilee for Renegades, Poems 1976-1980 (Dublin: Dolmen 1982).
- The Noise of the Fields (A Poetry Book Society Choice). (Dublin: Dolmen 1976).
- Stones (Dublin: Allen Figgis 1970), 27pp.

=== Literary criticism ===
- Enigmas of Sacrifice: A Critique of Joseph M. Plunkett and the Dublin Insurrection of 1916 (East Lansing: Michigan State University Press, 2016).
- Northman: John Hewitt, 1907-1987, An Irish Writer, His World and His Times (Oxford: Oxford University Press, 2015)
- Dublin Easter 1916: The French Connection (Dublin: Gill, 2012).
- Dissolute Characters: Irish Literary History Through Balzac, Sheridan Le Fanu, Yeats and Bowen (Manchester: Manchester University Press, 2011).
- Blood Kindred: W. B. Yeats, the Life, the Death, the Politics (London: Pimlico, 2005).
- Roger Casement in Death: Or Haunting the Free State (Dublin: UCD Press, 2002).
- Fool Of The Family: A Life Of J.M. Synge (London: W&N, 2000).
- The Battle of the Books: Two Decades of Irish Cultural Debate (Dublin: Lilliput, 1989).
- J.Sheridan Le Fanu (Stroud: Sutton, 1997).
- The Pamphlet Debate on the Union Between Great Britain and Ireland, 1797-1800. (Dublin: Irish Academic Press, 1995).
- From Burke to Beckett: Ascendancy, Tradition and Betrayal in Literary History (Cork: Cork University Press, 1994).
- Sheridan LeFanu and Victorian Ireland (Dublin: Lilliput, 1990).

== Awards ==
- Member of Aosdána
- Honorary member of the Széchenyi Academy of Letters and the Arts (Budapest)
