= Pauline Cummins =

Irish sculptor, painter, performance and video artist

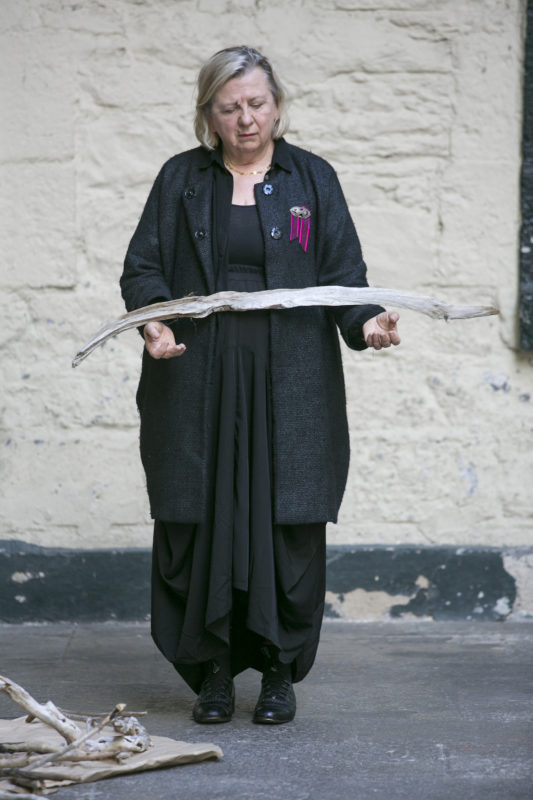
- Cummins performing 'No Bones About It...' in Kilmainham Gaol in 2016
- Born: 1949 (age 76–77); Dublin, Ireland
- Education: National College of Art and Design
- Known for: Sculpture; Performance art Video art

Pauline Cummins (born 1949) is an Irish sculptor, painter, performance and video artist. She was a lecturer at the National College of Art and Design from 1992 to 2014.

== Life ==
Pauline Cummins was born in Dublin in 1949. She studied painting and ceramics at the National College of Art and Design (NCAD) from 1966 to 1970. From 1974 to 1975 she worked on an aid programme in Turkana, Kenya, in the Craft Workshop teaching marketing and craft design. In 1975 she co-founded the ceramic studio, Ashford Pottery in County Wicklow with Teresa O'Connor. She moved to Toronto, Canada in 1979, where she focused on painting. Returning to Ireland, her work moved towards video and performance. In 2002 she completed an MA at NCAD. Cummins was a lecturer at the NCAD in the department of sculpture until 2014.

== Artistic work ==
Cummins' work focuses on identity and gender within communities and social situations. Her first performance, Unearthed, was commissioned by Projects UK in 1988, drawings for which were featured in the Irish Exhibition of Living Art 1982. She was a founding member of Women Artists Action Group (W.A.A.G.) in 1987, and was the group's first chair. She has collaborated with institutions including the National Maternity Hospital, Dublin and Mountjoy Women's Prison. She has exhibited and performed at the Royal Hibernian Academy, Tate Liverpool, and the Centre Culturel Irlandais, Paris.

In September 2010, she performed CHAOS at the Open Space Gallery, Victoria, Canada. In 2016 she was one of the performers selected for Future Histories at Kilmainham Gaol. Her works are held in the collections of the Irish Museum of Modern Art and the Douglas Hyde Gallery. She has won The George Campbell Painting Award in 1986, Sir Mark Turner Memorial Scholarship in 1992, Culture Ireland Award in 2010, and the Film and Video Award from the Arts Council of Ireland in 1990 and 1994.
