= The Morbegs =

- Genre: Fantasy; Puppetry
- Developed by: RTÉ
- Starring: Cindy Cummings; Tara Flynn; Carrie Crowley
- Country of origin: Ireland
- Original languages: English; Irish

Production
- Running time: 8 Minutes
- Production company: Raidió Teilifís Éireann (RTÉ)

Original release
- Network: Network 2 (Now RTÉ2)
- Release: 30 September 1996 – 15 May 1998

The Morbegs is a children's television programme which was transmitted every weekday (and occasionally aired on The Den) in Ireland. The show originally started on 30 September 1996 and ended on 15 May 1998 but continued in reruns until 5 November 2008.

== Overview ==
The Morbegs starred two larger than life-size creatures called Molly and Rossa, who came from a mythical place called Morbeg Land. They lived in a castle somewhere in Ireland, and were looked after by various magical, wise wizards. Rossa was played by Cindy Cummings and voiced by Diarmuid de Faoite and Dominic Moore. Molly was played by Anna Galligan and voiced by Majella Horan and Tara Flynn. The two Morbegs appeared alongside various human actors, including Carrie Crowley. Often, parts of the show were in simple Irish. The target age range was 3–6 years.

== Etymology ==
The word morbeg is derived from the Irish words mór, meaning 'big' or 'large' and beag, meaning 'small' or 'little'. The name was inspired by an Irish folk tune, 'Sí Beag, Sí Mor' [little fairy, big fairy] and was devised by Frances Kay, the script editor. The names Molly and Rossa were used by Frances Kay in some pilot scripts she wrote for the series, and were selected from a shortlist by the production team. The show ceased to be transmitted in early 2008, and has never been released on home media.

== Characters ==
Molly the Morbeg: The green Morbeg
Rossa the Morbeg: The orange Morbeg
Bran the Wizard: One of the human characters a wizard who often looks after Molly and Rossa in their castle.
