= Patricia Hurl =

Patricia Hurl (born 1943) is an Irish artist.

== Background ==
Hurl was born in 1943 in Dublin. She had three sisters and one brother. Her mother died of cancer when Hurl was 17. Hurl's father, born in 1894, was a Catholic from a farming background who grew up along the Londonderry–Antrim border. He worked as a primary school teacher and was politically active, becoming involved in the Ulster Troubles. Hurls parents moved to Charleston Avenue, Ranelagh, Dublin, where they bought their first house. They lived frugally and the family prioritised education.

== Career ==
Before becoming an artist, Hurl got a job with Williams and Woods, a Dublin confectionery factory, where she worked as a comptometer operator. Hurl attended the National College of Art and Design in 1975 as a mature student and returned to study at the Dún Laoghaire Institute of Art, Design and Technology, graduating in 1984 with a first class honours Bachelor of Arts in fine art. In 2000, she completed a Master of Arts in interactive multimedia at Institute of Technology, Tallaght. In the late 1980s and early 1990s, she was a committee member of Women Artists Action Group, a feminist group which promoted women artists from Ireland. From 1984 to 2009, Hurl was a lecturer in fine art at Dublin Institute of Technology College of Art and Design.

Her first solo exhibition, Living Room Myths and Legends, was shown at the Temple Bar Gallery and Studios in 1988. It included works based on the Kerry babies case. Major themes of her work include loss, pain, frustration, and loneliness. Her work has been included in The Great Book of Ireland.

In 2012, Hurl established the Damer House Gallery in Roscrea, County Tipperary. Hurl is a founder member of Na Cailleacha (Irish for witches or hags), a group of older female Irish artists.

In 2023, the Irish Museum of Modern Art held a major retrospective exhibition of Hurl's work. Parts of the collection toured Ireland as the Irish Gothic exhibition, including venues such as The Source and South Tipperary Arts Centre.

== Awards ==
Hurl was named one of Irish Tatler's Women of the Year 2023. In 1984, she won the Norah McGuinness Award for painting and in 2023 she won a Pollock Krasner Award.

== Personal life ==
Hurl married at the age of 20. Her husband, Joe Doherty, worked as a cooper at the Guinness brewery. They lived in Blanchardstown and Deansgrange, raising four children together. The couple separated in 1989 and were later divorced.

Hurl lives in Ballybirt, County Offaly, with her civil partner, Therry Rudin.
