= Women Artists Action Group =

Irish feminist artists group

Women Artists Action Group (WAAG)
- Formation: 1987
- Region served: Ireland
- Official language: English

Women Artists Action Group (WAAG) was an Irish feminist artists group founded with the goal of promoting the profile of women artists from Ireland, which was active from 1987 to 1991.

== History ==
Women Artists Action Group was founded in 1987 by Pauline Cummins, Breeda Mooney, and Louise Walsh. Cummins served as the group's first chair. It had an equivalent organisation in Northern Ireland, NIWAAG. They were founded as a reaction to the perceived lack of representation of women artists in exhibitions in Ireland and to the 1987 "Irish Women Artists from the Eighteenth Century to the Present Day" exhibition and publication from the National Gallery of Ireland.

WAAG had one exhibition at the Project Arts Centre in 1987, which featured over 90 women artists such as Anne Madden. The show featured over 100 slides of artwork, which later developed into a catalogued slide bank maintained by WAAG. Their second exhibition was held at the Royal Hospital Kilmainham (later the Irish Museum of Modern Art) in 1988, featuring a number of student artists from the National College of Art and Design. The group set out to be well integrated into international women artists' networks, with the chair of WAAG, Mooney elected to the executive of the International Association of Women in the Arts. Her election coincided with Dublin's year as the European City of Culture in 1991. As part of the celebrations, 11 women artists from across Europe created artworks across the River Liffey on the theme "Women Artists and the Environment", as well as Dublin hosting a visit from the Guerrilla Girls. While WAAG was active, from 1987 to 1991, they also organised a number of conferences across Ireland.

The archive materials of WAAG and NIWAAG were donated to NIVAL: National Irish Visual Arts Library in 2019 and 2024, respectively, where they are accessible to the public for research.

== Committee members ==
- Pauline Cummins (Chair)
- Patricia Hurl
- Patricia McKenna
- Marie Hanlon
- Breeda Mooney (Treasurer)

== Notable members ==
- Pauline Cummins
- Marie Hanlon
- Ann Marie Keaveney
- Alice Maher
- Jane Maxwell
- Jane McCormack
- Breeda Mooney
- Geraldine O'Reilly
- Kathy Prendergast
- Louise Walsh
