= Gerry Hanberry =

Irish poet

Gerard (Gerry) Hanberry is an Irish writer, songwriter, and musician who lives in Galway, Ireland.

== Bibliography ==
- 'On Raglan Road - Great Irish Love Songs and the Women who Inspired Them' - The Collins Press [2016]
- More Lives Than One - The Remarkable Wilde Family Through the Generations - The Collins Press, Sept. [2011]
- Rough Night, Stonebridge Publications, May 2002
- Something Like Lovers, Stonebridge Publications, October 2005
- At Grattan Road, Salmon Poetry, 2009
- 'What Our Shoes Say About Us', (Salmon Poetry, 2014)
