= Roscrea Castle =

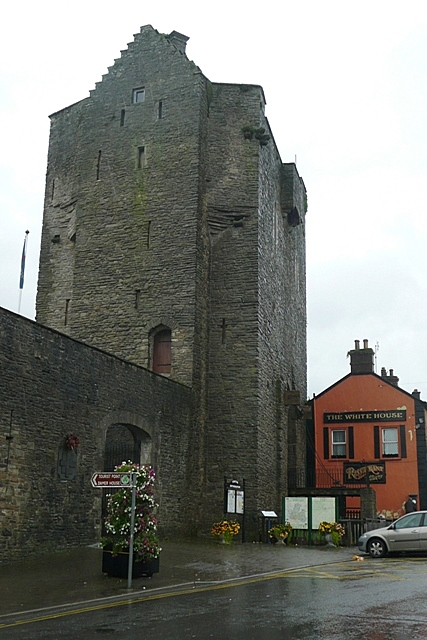
- The gate building of Roscrea Castle

- Location within Ireland

General information
- Location: Castle Street, Roscrea, Ireland
- Coordinates: 52.95494°N 7.79788°W
- Elevation: 9 metres (30 ft)
- Opened: 1213; 813 years ago

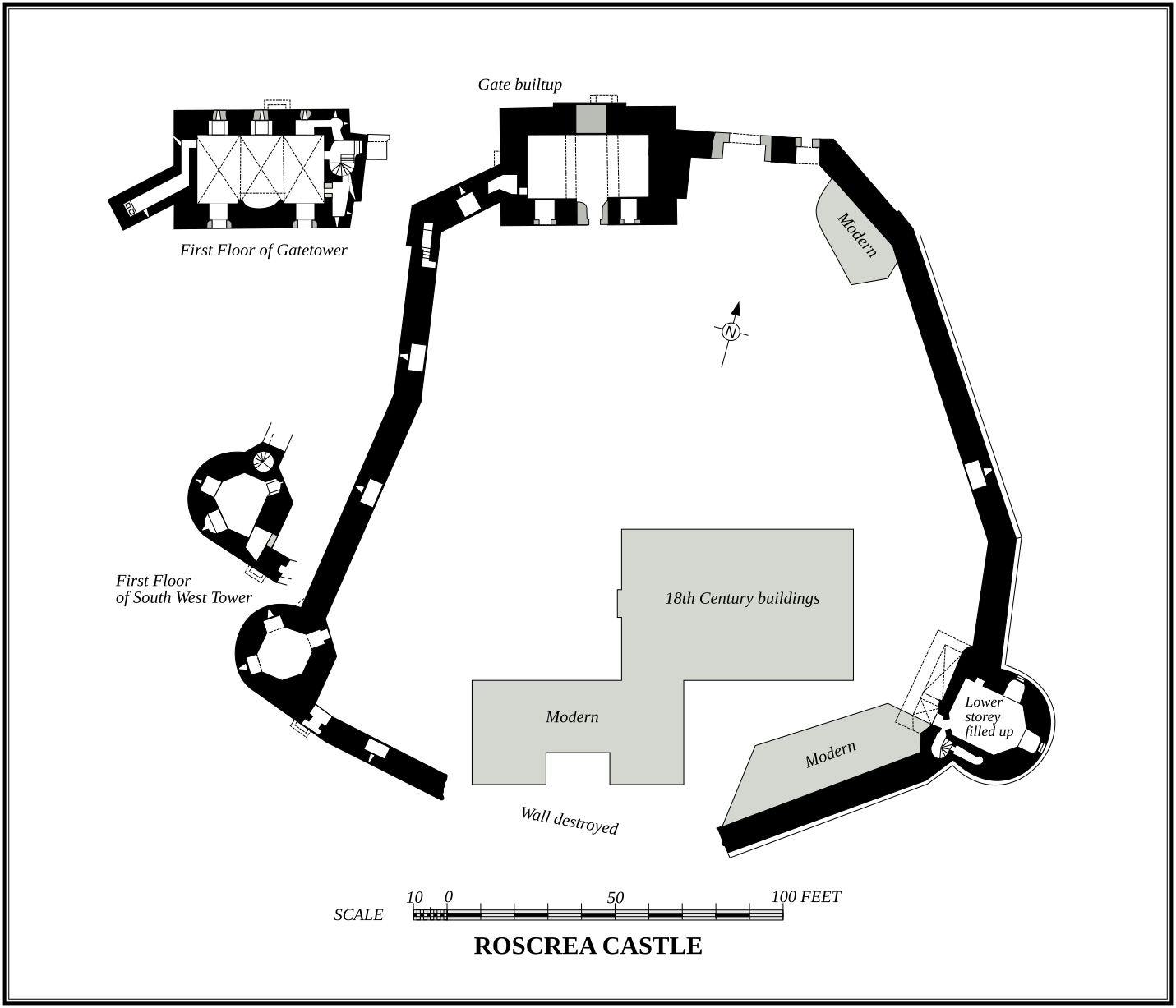
Plan of Roscrea Castle

Roscrea Castle is a 13th-century motte-and-bailey castle in the town of Roscrea, Ireland. The castle consists of a walled courtyard, gate block, and angled towers. Along with 18th century Damer House and gardens, the castle forms part of Roscrea Heritage Centre.

== History ==
The south-eastern tower is sometimes known as King John's Castle as its erection is attributed to John, King of England. While the current stone castle was built after his death, there is evidence that John ordered a "motam et bretagium" (motte and tower) to be built on the site in 1213. At the time of construction the land was owned by the Bishop of Killaloe. Construction was overseen by the Justiciar, Henry of London, and formed part of John's efforts to solidify his conquest of Ireland, particularly the midlands and southern counties. In 1315, the castle was granted to the Butlers of Ormond who held it until the 18th century. In 1646, the castle and town were stormed by Owen Roe O'Neill during the Cromwellian conquest of Ireland. The castle fell to Cromwell in 1650 and was used for a short period by Cromwell's son-in-law Henry Ireton. In 1703, the castle was sold to the Royal Hospital Kilmainham by the Duke of Ormonde. It was purchased by local merchant John Damer in 1722 and later passed down to the Earl of Portarlington. It was used as a barracks from 1798, housing 350 soldiers, and later served as a school, library, and tuberculosis sanatorium. The castle fell into disrepair in the 19th century, with a roof collapse which necessitated extensive repairs in the 1850s. It was named a national monument in 1892 and is registered as National Monument number 211.

== Design and construction ==
The original wooden castle was destroyed in the late 13th century and replaced with the current stone structure. More than £875 was spent on works from 1274 to 1295, overseen by John de Lydyard. The current structure consists of a 40-metre-wide courtyard enclosed by curtain walls and a ditch. The walls are up to 2.5 metres thick in parts. The castle was originally surrounded by a river to the east and a moat on the other sides. While it does not have a keep, the main residence is a three-storey rectangular gate building to the north, complemented by two three-quarter round towers, one to the southwest and one to the southeast. The south-western tower, known as the Ormond Tower, contains a first floor room with a fireplace on the north wall and a 17th-century plasterwork coat of arms. The south-eastern tower, referred to as King John's Castle, is taller, with 3 storeys. The original gate building is dated to around 1280 but the current stone structure was built by the 4th Earl of Ormond in the 15th century. The gate building is approximately 27 metres high and originally included a bascule bridge and portcullis. The entrance has a barrel vault ceiling. Below the gate tower is a basement prison which was accessible by trapdoor. In the 17th century, a second floor living area was added to the building including a pointed groined vault, three bays, lancet windows, a garderobe, a chimney stack, a large hooded dog-tooth capital fireplace on the southern wall, and crow-stepped gables. The drawbridge was operated from this floor. A spiral staircase in the eastern corner of the building gives access to the upper floors. The slate roof dates from the 18th century. The building was further renovated in the 19th century. The courtyard includes buildings from the 18th century and some modern structures. The southern castle wall is no longer intact. Some examples of plaster decorations from the 1640s survive.

== Damer House ==
In 1728, John Damer built a large Georgian house on the grounds of the castle. Designed in Queen Anne style, the three-storey-over-basement house features 9 bay windows and one of only 2 Queen Anne style staircases in Ireland. Although recognised as one of the few examples of pre-Palladian architecture in Ireland, Damer House was due to be demolished in the 1960s, with suggestions that it be replaced by a swimming pool or a bacon factory. It was eventually saved after a campaign by Desmond Guinness and the Irish Georgian Society, which took out a lease on the house in 1973. The house was restored initially by the Irish Georgian Society from 1980 to 1983 and opened to the public. The lease was then transferred to the Roscrea Heritage Society. Restoration was completed in the 1990s by the national heritage service Dúchas with additional funding from Bord Fáilte and £100,000 from the Government Policy for Architecture. More than £1.3 million was spent on the project, allowing many original period features to be maintained. The house, which is owned by Tipperary County Council and managed with Roscrea Heritage Society, is listed on the National Inventory of Architectural Heritage as being of special social, historical, archaeological, artistic and architectural interest. In 2012, artists Patricia Hurl and Therry Rudin established the Damer House Gallery.

== Awards ==
- European Museum of the Year Award special award
- Irish Museums Trust Award

== See also ==
- Castles in Great Britain and Ireland

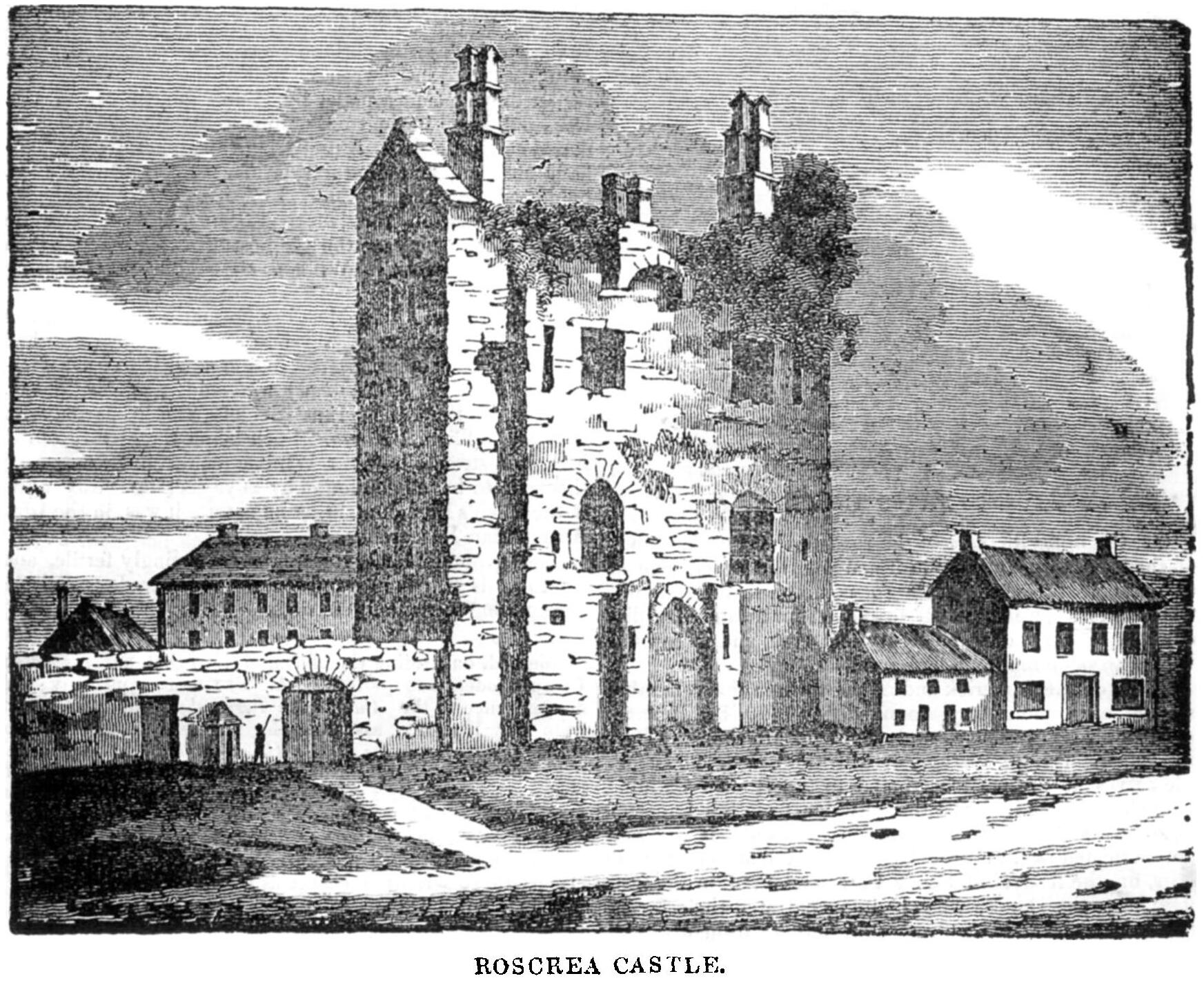
The castle in 1834
