= Rhona Clarke =

Irish composer

- Born: 1958 (age 67–68); Dublin, Ireland
- Education: University College Dublin; Queen's University Belfast
- Occupation: Composer

Rhona Clarke (born 1958) is an Irish composer.

== Biography ==
Rhona Clarke was born in Dublin. She studied music at University College Dublin, pursued composition studies with John Buckley and James Wilson, and completed a PhD at Queen's University Belfast under the supervision of Michael Alcorn.

Clarke has received commissions from organisations including the RTÉ National Symphony Orchestra, the Sydney Philharmonia Chorus, Chamber Choir Ireland, the Choir of the Chapels Royal, the Cork International Choral Festival, Concorde, Music Network and the National Concert Hall. Her work has represented Ireland at both the International Rostrum of Composers and the ISCM World Music Days.

In 2014 she was the featured composer in the RTÉ National Symphony Orchestra's Horizons series. Her orchestral work SHIFT, commissioned by the RTÉ National Symphony Orchestra, was premiered at the National Concert Hall in Dublin on 14 January 2014 by the RTÉ National Symphony Orchestra conducted by Gavin Maloney, and later that year represented Ireland at the International Rostrum of Composers in Helsinki.

Since 2009 she has collaborated with the visual artist Marie Hanlon on projects involving film, live performance, sound and exhibition work.

Clarke is a member of Aosdána.

== Music ==
Clarke's output includes choral, chamber, orchestral and electronic works. Laura Sheils has described her sacred choral music as combining traditional liturgical and chant-derived materials with contemporary harmonic and textural techniques. Reviewing Sempiternam in The Irish Times, Michael Dervan wrote that Clarke's music favours delicate rather than abrasive dissonance and noted its characteristic layering and gradation of sound. In Gramophone, Liam Cagney described Clarke's choral writing as idiomatic, noted her preference for Latin texts, and highlighted the combination of sustained vowel lines, melismatic counterpoint and early-music-inflected elements in the recording.

== Selected works ==
Orchestral

- A Great Rooted Tree (1991)
- Everything Passes (1997)
- Where the Clouds Go (2005)
- SHIFT (2013)

Choral with orchestra or ensemble

- Gloria Deo (1988)
- Triptych (1990)
- Missa (1999)
- Sympathy (2000)
- Street Dancer (2010)

Choral unaccompanied

- Suantraí Ghráinne (1983)
- Psalm 148 (1988)
- A Song for St Cecilia's Day (1991)
- Rorate caeli (1994)
- Two Marian Anthems (2007)
- Veni Creator (2010)
- Three Carols on Medieval Texts (2014)
- Ave atque vale (2017)
- O vis aeternitatis (2020)
- Requiem (2020)

Chamber music

- Sisyphus (1985)
- Purple Dust (1987)
- Magnificat (1990)
- Undercurrent (2001)
- Piano Trio No. 2 (2001, rev. 2007)
- Piano Trio No. 3 (2002)
- Pas de Quatre (2009)
- A Different Game: Piano Trio No. 4 (2016)

Electro-acoustic music

- Whaling Afloat and Ashore (1991)
- City with No Name (1992)
- Pied Piper (1994)
- con coro (2011)
- as if nothing had happened (2012)

== Recordings ==
- A Different Game, performed by the Fidelio Trio, Métier MSV 28561 (2017).
- Sempiternam: Choral Music by Rhona Clarke, performed by State Choir Latvija, Māris Sirmais (cond.), Métier MSV 28614 (2022). The recording was an Editor's Choice in Gramophone and was nominated for the 2022 Opus Klassik award in the Choral Recording category.
