= Michael Cullen (artist) =

Irish painter (1946–2020)

Michael Cullen RHA
- Born: 1946; Kilcoole, Ireland
- Died: July 10, 2020 (aged 73–74); Dublin, Ireland
- Education: Central School of Art and Design; National College of Art and Design
- Known for: Oil painting
- Movement: Neo-expressionism
- Spouse: Brigid
- Children: 3
- Elected: Aosdána

Michael Cullen RHA (1946 – 10 July 2020) was an Irish Neo-Expressionist painter.

== Early life ==
Cullen was born in Kilcoole, County Wicklow in 1946.

== Career ==
Cullen studied at the Central School of Art and Design (London) and at National College of Art and Design (Dublin).

He lived and worked in Spain, Morocco, the United States, Mexico and Berlin. He won the Independent Artists’ Major Painting Award in 1984 and the National Portrait Award in 1989. He was elected to Aosdána in 1984.

According to Aidan Dunne,

[Cullen]'s paintings are of an autobiographical nature and are most often celebratory. His bright colours are applied most often in impasto and the palette is perhaps influenced by his time spent in Spain, France and Morocco. He is clearly influenced by Fauvism, particularly Raoul Dufy and Pablo Picasso. Though a figurative artist, Cullen enjoys the post-Cubist freedom to ignore conventional rules of perspective, trading this freedom off against the limitation of acknowledged flatness. Besides the space itself, however, he has also taken liberties with naturalistic representations of figures and objects, radically reorganising structures in a directly Cubist manner.

His works are in the collections of the National Gallery of Ireland, The Hugh Lane, the Arts Council of Northern Ireland and Dundee Contemporary Arts.

Cullen died in 2020.
