= Cindy Cummings =

American-Irish dancer and choreographer

- Born: Wenatchee, Washington, United States
- Education: University of Oregon
- Known for: choreography, dance
- Notable work: Zero Crossing; Oileán rEvolution; Triur Ban
- Movement: Contemporary dance
- Elected: Aosdána (2007)

Cindy Cummings is an American-Irish choreographer and contemporary dancer. She is a member of Aosdána, an elite Irish association of artists.

== Early life and education ==
Cummings was born in Wenatchee, Washington. She pursued studies in dance and theatre at the University of Oregon, and in New York City.

== Career ==
Cummings began her career in 1986. She has been based in Ireland since 1990, and her first Irish performance was in Zero Crossing at the Dublin Theatre Festival that year.

She has worked in theatre, television and film, mostly on collaborative productions. Her work was described by the Centre Culturel Irlandais as "working on the vulnerable and mutable place of the body within contemporary society using play and humour as tools for creative interrogation." Plays and interactive performances she has performed in include Jody O’Neill's What I (Don't) Know About Autism (the Abbey Theatre), Habit Performing, One Night Stands with Tommy Hayes, The Big Chapel X (Asylum Productions at the Abbey Theatre), Triur Ban, The Secret Project, Toupees and Snare Drums, Tracing Houdini and Baby Jane.

She played Rossa on the Irish children's TV show The Morbegs, wearing the costume but not providing the voice. She acted in the film We All Come From Somewhere and performed an interpretative dance as a TEDx presentation.

Major collaborations have included multi-year work with composer and artist Todd Winkler of Brown University, Connolly and Cleary of Paris, and Jools Gilson and Richard Povall. She has performed as part of a trio known as The Vintage. She also tutors, including at KCat in Callan, County Kilkenny, and Inclusive Dance Cork (IDC), and has also taught or tutored at the Samuel Beckett Centre within Trinity College Dublin, the Gaiety School of Acting and the NAYD. Her work is also used in courses taught at Yale University, Brown University and Columbia University. She was for a period co-director of the Fumbally Court Studio in Dublin, and was in 2014 one of three artists-in-residence at the University College Dublin College of Science.

== Recognition ==
In 2007 Cummings was elected to the Irish affiliation or academy of artists with a substantial body of work, Aosdána.

== Personal life ==
Formerly based in Dublin, Cummings now resides in County Kilkenny. She sometimes works as a river guide in Montana.
