= Conleth O'Connor =

Irish poet (1947–1993)

- Born: 1947; Newbridge, County Kildare, Ireland
- Died: 1993 (age 45)
- Occupation: Poet
- Spouse: Frances
- Children: 1
- Writing career
- Language: English
- Years active: 1976–1993

Conleth O'Connor (1947–1993) was an Irish poet.

== Early life ==
O'Connor was born in 1947. His family were from Dún Laoghaire, but he grew up in Camolin, County Wexford.

== Career ==
O'Connor published four collections of poetry and was elected to Aosdána, an elite association of Irish artists, serving as Toscaire (co-leader) in 1990. He worked at the Irish Writers Centre and Irish Writers Union. He contributed to The Great Book of Ireland and died in 1993.

He most admired Samuel Beckett, Paul Celan and Miroslav Holub.

Anthony Cronin described O'Connor as "one of Ireland's most distinctive and experimental poets until his premature death in 1993, dissecting the realities of modern Irish life." Anne Haverty wrote a poem in his honour in a 1997 issue of Books Ireland, "Death's Gift."

== Bibliography ==
=== Poetry ===
- Trinities (1976)
- The Judas Cry (1979)
- Behind the Garden Gnomes (1982)
- A Corpse Auditions Its Mourners: New and Selected Poems (1987)
- Nights without Stars, Days Without Sun: Selected Poems (1997; posthumous)

=== Plays ===
- The Re-Incarnation of Mr. Dogsbody
- Two Letters and Overtime

== Personal life ==
O'Connor was married to Frances, a ceramicist; they had one child, Breffni. He was a close friend of the writer Dermot Bolger.
