= Rosaleen Davey =

Irish artist

- Born: 1947 (age 78–79); Belfast

Rosaleen Davey (born 1947) is an Irish visual artist.

== Biography ==
Rosaleen Davey was born in Belfast in 1947. She has lived in Dublin since the 1970s. Davey studied at the Ulster College of Art in Belfast and at Leeds University. Davey studied with Colin Harrison. She has taught painting at the National College of Art and Design. Davey creates figurative or abstract. Her works have been exhibited in a number of galleries in Ireland such as the Ayesha Castle Gallery, County Dublin in 1997, Butler Gallery, Kilkenny in 1996 and the Caldwell Gallery, Dublin in 1982. She has also exhibited at the Cavanacor Gallery, Taylor Galleries, Fenderesky Gallery, the RHA, the Irish Museum of Modern Art and Crawford Art Gallery. Davey's work is included in Irish public collections.
