= Mia Gallagher =

Irish writer

- Born: 1967/68; Dublin, Ireland
- Writing career
- Language: English; Latin; Spanish
- Years active: 2006–present
- Notable work: HellFire

Mia Gallagher (born 1967/68) is an Irish writer and actress.

== Early life ==
Gallagher was born in 1967/68 in Dublin.

== Career ==
Gallagher's first novel HellFire won the Irish Tatler Women of the Year Literature Award in 2007. Anne Gildea described it as "the relentless inner monologue of protagonist Lucy Dolan, inner-city junkie, just out of prison, retelling the story of herself to make sense of her raddled journey from womb to now. The Dublin it evokes is a dirty gothic heroin- and poverty-addled pit, webbed over with multiple sorry stories, streaked through with sinister myth," comparing Gallagher to Flann O'Brien.

Gallagher received several Literature Bursaries from the Arts Council of Ireland. Her second novel, Beautiful Pictures of the Lost Homeland, was released in 2016, to mixed reviews. She also released a short story collection, Shift, in 2018.

In 2018 she was elected to Aosdána.

Gallagher is also an actress.

== Works ==
=== Short stories ===
- Shift (2019)
- Dubliners (2022, with Mario Sughi)

=== Novels ===
- HellFire (2006)
- Beautiful Pictures of the Lost Homeland
