= Marie Hanlon =

Irish artist working in various media

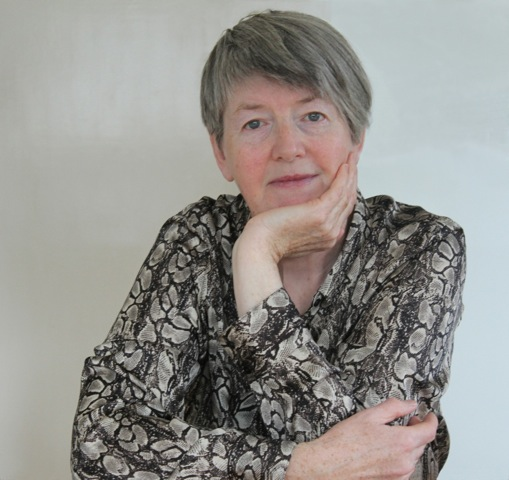
- Portrait of Marie Hanlon
- Born: 20 December 1948 (age 77); Goresbridge, County Kilkenny, Ireland
- Education: University College Dublin, National College of Art and Design
- Notable work: It’s all About Books (2019), DIC TAT (2014), Everything we see… (2014)
- Website: https://www.mariehanlon.com/

Marie Hanlon (born 20 December 1948) is a Dublin-based Irish artist working in a variety of media including painting, drawing, sculpture, video and installation. She has collaborated with Irish composers, most notably Rhona Clarke, in creating works which can be realised in both concert performance and gallery situations.

== Early life and education ==
Hanlon received her early education from the Brigidine Sisters, Goresbridge, County Kilkenny and later graduated from University College, Dublin (1977) with a BA in English and History of European Painting. In 2018 she received an MA from The National College of Art & Design, Dublin. Hanlon was elected to Aosdána in 2015; Aosdána is the cultural body which recognises major and sustained contributions to the arts in Ireland.

== Artistic practice ==
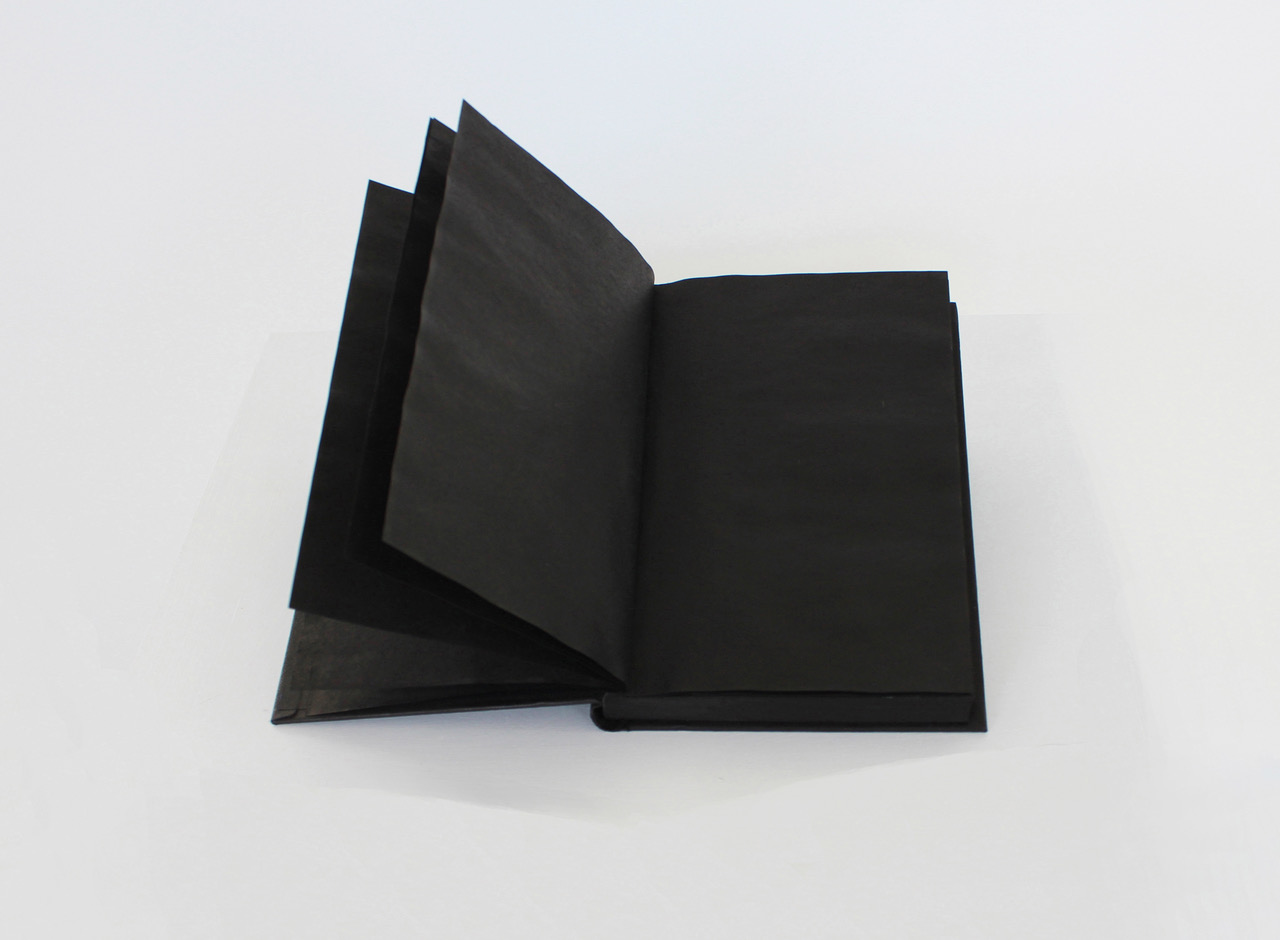
'Black Book', 2019, by Marie Hanlon

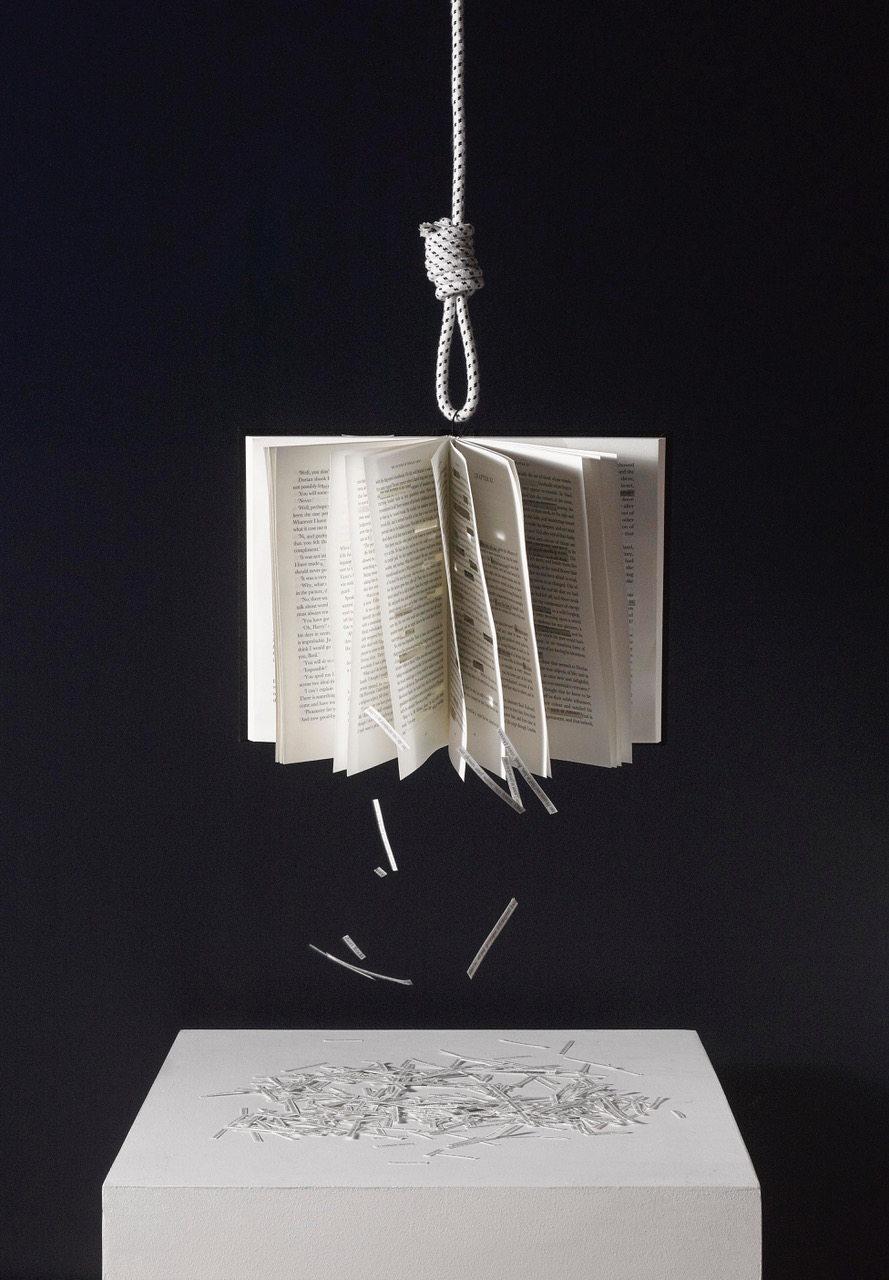
'The Life and Death of the Author', 2019, by Marie Hanlon, photographed by Gillian Buckley

In 1988, Hanlon became a member of WAAG – Women Artists Action Group (1987–1991). She exhibited with the group in their first and only show in Ireland, Art Beyond Barriers at the Irish Museum of Modern Art in 1989 (Cummins, 1989). Hanlon's first solo show was in Temple Bar Gallery in 1993. By now her works had begun to demonstrate a stylistic approach, which is simultaneously geometric and lyrical, their reduced elements tautly balanced and “characteristically subtle in the handling of tone, texture and composition.” (Finlay, 1997) “The paintings are like poems or pieces of music, at once tentative and sensual, yet highly structured.” (Benson, 2004)

“Forms are repeated in the paintings but rarely in exactly the same way. It is the repetition which gives the work its rhythm, a kind of pulse is established by stating and restating the idea. However, as soon as a pattern is set up it is quickly subverted and transformed, the beat changes as it were, giving the work greater complexity and interest.” (Clarke, 2009)

Critic Gavin Weston has described “works that are paradoxically structurally contained yet emotionally expansive.” (Weston, 2004)

== Collaborations and recent work ==
Affinities with music in Hanlon’s work led to new developments and an expanded practice. Two significant exhibitions in 2014 involved collaborations with several contemporary Irish composers; Everything we see… at Solstice Arts Centre (2014) included works made with composers, Grainne Mulvey, Jane O’ Leary, Rhona Clarke and Emma O’Halloran. The show occupied all three of Solstice’s upper galleries and in the foyer, an installation of thirty-eight drawings further explored links between music and line. Mary Cremin observes ‘The mark-making of notation [musical] and its relationship to drawing is the beginning of exchange between composer and artist’.

DIC TAT at Draíocht Centre for the Arts (2014) was a two-person show by Hanlon and composer Rhona Clarke. In this exhibition, a metronome provided basic pulse material from which sound and visual elements were derived. A group of drawings ‘dictated’ by various metronome beats were documented in real-time and shown on a two-channel video. ‘The narrow margin of space for deliberation remains confined to the intervals between beats.’ Rowan Sexton

A further development of Hanlon’s collaborative practice is a video for live performance; Richard O’Donnell and The Royal Irish Academy Percussion Ensemble commissioned Behind closed Doors (2016) for the Tambourimba Percussion Festival, Cali, Colombia; music by Rhona Clarke, video Marie Hanlon. In 2019 accordionist Dermot Dunne played live to a screening of The Small Hours (2019) Shatin Town Hall, Hong Kong, music Rhona Clarke, video Marie Hanlon.

Hanlon’s exhibition (2019) It’s All About Books, The Cregan Library, Dublin City University, explored the book as art object, Irish Times critic Aidan Dunne wrote ‘’Even when her approach is playful, as it often is, what we see is imbued with what might be described as a threat of nullity, the disappearance or cancellation of meaning.’

‘It's All About Books manifests the artist's ongoing exploration of the 'complexities of seeing', inviting viewers to variously consider: What kind of seeing occurs when we read.’ Material Knowledge: The Book as Artistic Device, Joanne Laws, It’s All About Books, 2019.

== Personal life ==
Hanlon lives in Sutton on the Howth peninsula on the northside of Dublin.
