= Salmon Poetry =

Irish publishing company

Salmon Poetry is an Irish and international book-publishing company. It was founded in 1987 in Ireland by poet Jessie Lendennie as a platform for new Irish and international poetry in English.

== History ==
Founded in Galway, the press moved to County Clare in 1995. Their office is based at The Salmon Bookshop & Literary Centre in Ennistymon, County Clare.

At first, Salmon published a poetry magazine that has later grown into a poetry press. According to MEAS report providing statistics for Irish poetry publications, Salmon Poetry in 2018 was the most prolific poetry press on the Island of Ireland.

According to Poetry Ireland Review, Salmon Poetry "broadens the parameter of Irish literature by opening up to other cultures and by urging new perspectives on established traditions. That enviable balance of focus and ranginess is a rare and instructive achievement".

American poet Tess Gallagher, quoted on the Inpress Books website, wrote the following about Salmon Poetry:

"Like the sea-run Steelhead salmon that thrashes upstream to its spawning ground, then instead of dying, returns to the sea – Salmon Poetry Press brings precious cargo to both Ireland and America in the poetry it publishes, then carries that select work to its readership against incalculable odds."

== Notable poets published by the press ==
- Rita Ann Higgins
- Theo Dorgan
- Moya Cannon
- Mary O'Donnell
- Mary O'Malley (poet)
- Patrick Chapman
- Eva Bourke
- Gerard Donovan
- Adrienne Rich
- Marvin Bell
- Richard Tillinghast
- Carol Ann Duffy
