= Catherine Delaney =

Irish sculptor, installation artist and photographer (born 1965)

- Born: 1965 (age 60–61); Dublin, Ireland
- Education: National College of Art and Design
- Known for: Sculpture, installation art, photography
- Elected: Aosdána (2008)

Catherine Delaney (born 1965) is an Irish artist, working in the disciplines of sculpture, installation art and photography. She was elected as a member of Ireland's academy or affiliation of artists, Aosdána and her work is held in multiple public collections.

== Early life and education ==
Catherine Delaney was born in Dublin, Ireland, in 1965, one of five siblings. Her father was the artist Edward Delaney and her mother was Nancy (née O'Brien). Her father moved away in 1980, settling in the west of Ireland, and later starting a second family. She pursued third level studies in Ireland's National College of Art and Design (NCAD), graduating in 1984. She further studied sculpture in New Jersey, at the Johnson Atelier, and then from 1986 to 1988 on a scholarship at an arts academy in Munich, working on sculpture and photographic arts.

== Career and work ==
Dublin's Project Arts Centre hosted Delaney's first solo show, Rib by Rib, in 1994. She also exhibited sculpture at the Grant Fine Arts gallery in County Down, where her father had previously had a sculpture show. One major transient installation was Enclose, a roughly bridge-shaped structure at the Grennan Mill in County Kilkenny, supported by the local authority and Ireland's Arts Council after plans for a similar installation at the Ireland-Northern Ireland were placed on indefinite hold; the macquette of the sculpture was bought by Ireland's Office of Public Works. Another was Inside-Outside in Baltinglass. A large-scale permanent installation is the poured-metal Fill in Ballymun.

== Recognition ==
Delaney was elected to Ireland's academy or affiliation of artists, Aosdána, in 2008. She has received support from the Arts Council, both before election to Aosdána, and since election, including payment of the "cnuas".
