= Geraldine O'Reilly =

Irish painter, drawer and printmaker

- Born: 1956 (age 69–70); Rathwire, County Westmeath, Ireland
- Education: National College of Art and Design
- Known for: printmaking, drawing, painting
- Elected: Aosdána (2004)

Geraldine O'Reilly (born 1956) is an Irish painter, drawer and printmaker. She is a member of Aosdána, an elite Irish association of artists.

== Early life ==
O'Reilly was born in Rathwire, Killucan, County Westmeath in 1956 and grew up in Killucan, County Westmeath.

== Career ==
O'Reilly studied at the National College of Art and Design (NCAD) in Dublin, graduating in 1982. She received a Fulbright Scholarship in 1989 and was a member of the Women Artists Action Group. She is a member of Graphic Studio Dublin and chaired it in 2008. She was elected to Aosdána in 2004.

Her work is held at the National Gallery of Ireland, Irish Museum of Modern Art and Chester Beatty Library.

O'Reilly's work covers topics such as women's history, emigration and "landscapes that reveal something of the history of human interaction." She works in etching and lithography.

She has also taught at Ballyfermot College of Further Education, Arbour Hill Prison, NCAD, the Royal Hibernian Academy, and the National Gallery of Ireland.

== Personal life ==
O'Reilly is based in Rathwire Lower, Killucan, Killucan, County Westmeath.
