= Adrian Kenny =

Irish writer

- Born: Adrian Kenny; 1945 (age 80–81); Dublin, Ireland

Adrian Kenny (born 1945) is an Irish writer.

== Life ==
Adrian Kenny was born in Dublin in 1945.

He was educated at Gonzaga College and then studied history at University College Dublin.

After graduation, he worked as an English teacher in Ireland and abroad, and also as a freelance journalist.

He is a member of Aosdána, the Irish Academy of the Arts.

== Works ==
=== Novel ===
- The feast of Michaelmas (Co-Op Books, 1979)

=== Short stories ===
- Arcady (1983)
- Portobello Notebook (Lilliput Press, 2012)
- Mint & Other Stories (Lilliput Press, 2025)

=== Autobiography ===
- Before the Wax Hardened (Lilliput Press, 1991)
- Istanbul Diary (Poolbeg Press, 1994)
- The Family Business (Lilliput Press, 1999)

=== Other work ===
- The Journal of Arland Ussher. Edited by Adrian Kenny. (Raven Arts, 1980)
- An Caisideach Ban. The Songs and Adventures of Tomas O Caiside. Translated from the Irish by Adrian Kenny. (Greens Print, 1993)
