= Anita Groener =

Dutch painter

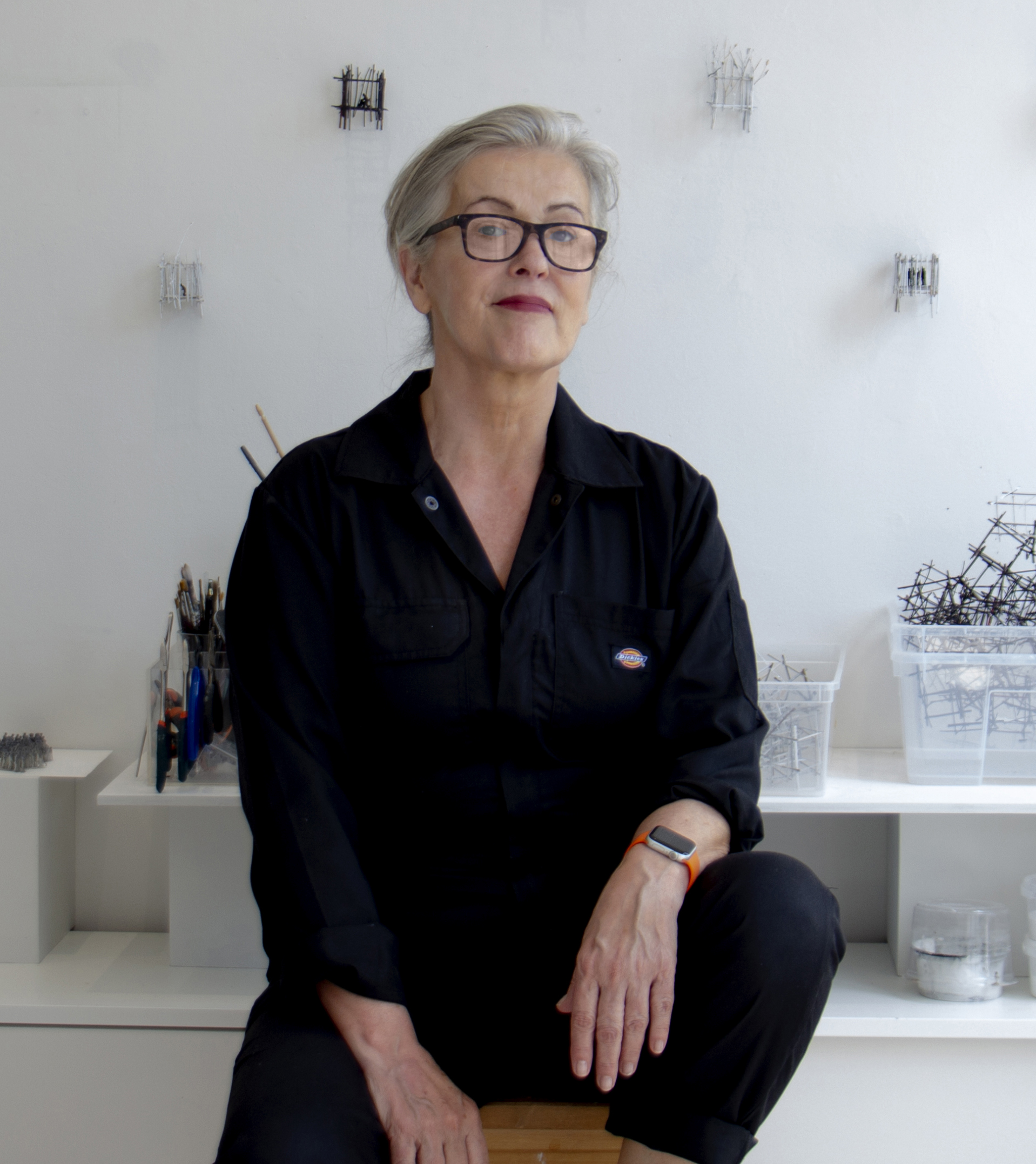
- Anita Groener, 2023
- Born: Anita Groener; 15 June 1958 (age 68); Veldhoven, Netherlands
- Education: Mollerinstituut Moller Institute in Tilburg; Hogeschool voor de Kunsten, Arnhem
- Known for: Artist
- Notable work: "To The Edge of Your World" (2023-Present); The Past is a Foreign Country (2018-2019); State (2013); Somewhere Else (2012); Crossing (2006)
- Website: www.anitagroener.com

Anita Groener (born 1958, Veldhoven, Netherlands) is an artist based in Dublin, Ireland. She creates sculptures, drawings, films and paintings, which she exhibits internationally.

== Career ==
Groener graduated in 1980 with a BA from the Mollerinstituut Moller Institute in Tilburg, the Netherlands. She received an MA from the Hogeschool voor de Kunsten, Arnhem, the Netherlands, in 1982, and moved to Dublin in the same year. After her move to Dublin, Groener appears to have found early, ready acceptance among her peers. She was elected to the committee of the Independent Artists in 1985, and the same year she was instrumental in bringing a show of ten Dutch artists to Ireland. She was one of only 120 artists, composers and a calligrapher included in The Great Book of Ireland published in 1991. She began lecturing at the Dublin Institute of Technology (DIT) in the Department of Fine Art in 1982. She was Course Leader for Fine Art during two periods and was head of department from 2004 to 2006. In 2005 she was elected to be a member of Aosdána. Groener left DIT to pursue her own practice in 2014.

== Work ==
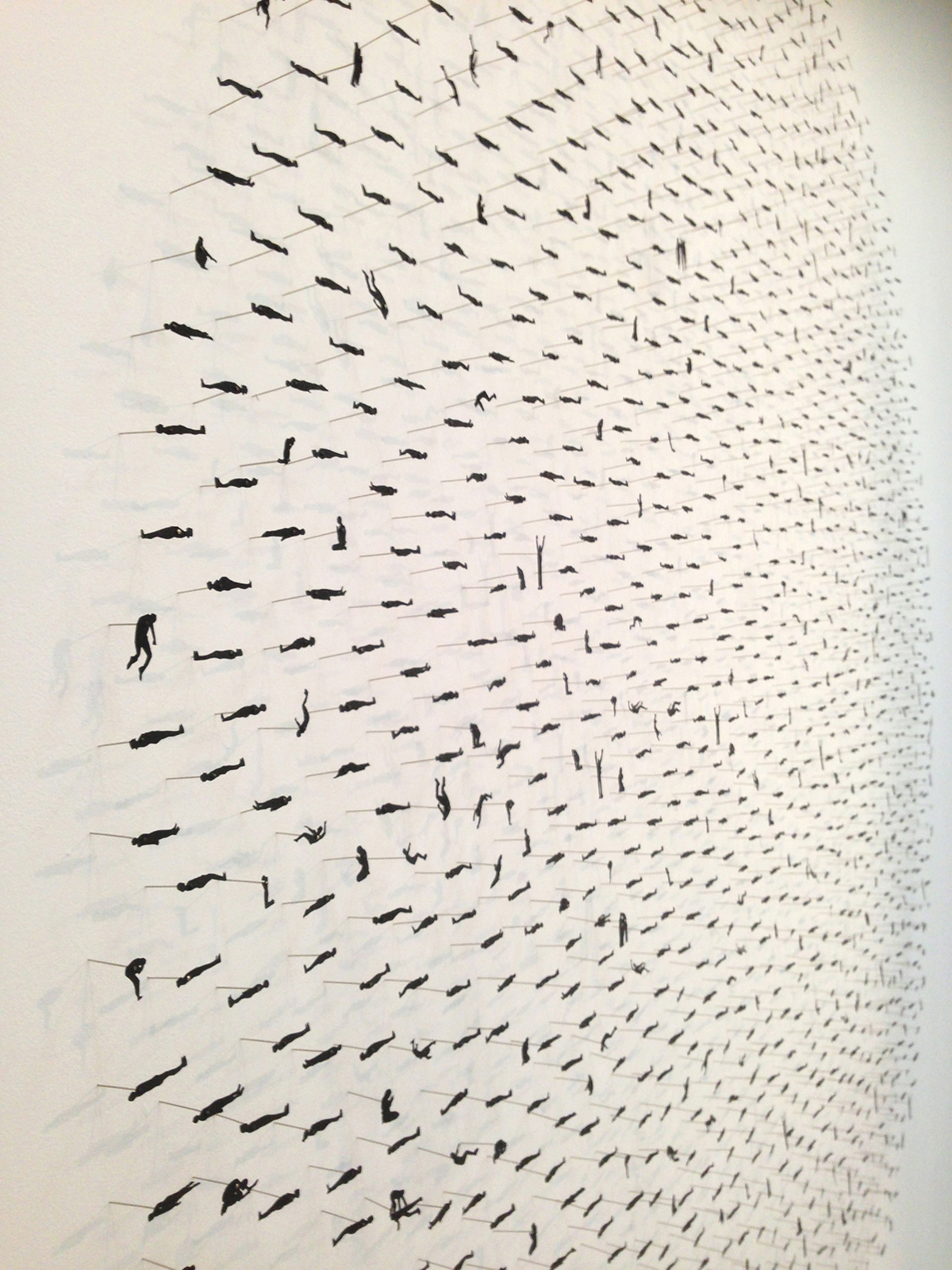
Anita Groener: 'STATE'; installation shot, Witteveen Gallery, Amsterdam, May 2013

Using humble and ephemeral materials, Groener produces sculptural works, drawings, films, and paintings that explore themes of loss, displacement, exile, and war. Her work confronts the bloody conflicts, forced migrations, and enduring injustices of current history, yet holds out the possibilities of resilience and renewal. Groener's practice frames remembrance as a moral and political resistance against oblivion, asking a quiet yet urgent question: What does it mean to be human in an age shaped by rupture, precarity, and migration?

=== Early Work ===
Groener's earlier work is best known for her drawings and drawing-like paintings, sometimes with cut-outs pinned to a wall and often of very large scale. Groener's work over the decade, 2005 – 2015, is simultaneously sparse and seemingly overpopulated. For example, of the eponymous artwork in her 2013 show State at the Royal Hibernian Academy (RHA), Dublin, art critic Cristín Leach wrote, "Nearly 2,000 tiny individuals are trapped, held with pins. Stand back and they form the population of a spotlit planet, a floating sphere that points to man's ultimate insignificance. Step forward and they argue for the intimate importance of our presence in the scheme of things."

In contrast to her later, more restrained works, those commenting on early displays of Groener's art in Dublin were impressed by the powerful imagery and execution, and regarded them as roughly aligned with the (New) Expressionist and possibly Cobra traditions. The connection between her earlier and later pieces can perhaps be seen in large, predominantly monochromatic paintings like Trajectory, 2004, or Crossing, 2006. These are gesturally expressive but more patterned than her earlier works, which tended to feature human- or animal-like elements that were proportionately more prominent.

Writers and critics tracked these changes in Groener's work. "Repetitive visual patterns and images evoke the repetitive patterns of human communication. Rather than diminishing the significance of such routine intercourse, the effect underlines the latent emotional charge of apparently banal exchanges. Behind the language of habit, there is a tacit awareness of separation and change, of loss and distance, of time passing." Similarly, critic Mark Ewart wrote with respect to Groener's Heartlands show at the Rubicon Gallery, Dublin, "The first thing to hit you about these 28 paintings is, paradoxically, their sparsity."

A leitmotif in Groener's work has been the psychological. Ciarán Benson (now Emeritus Professor of Psychology at University College Dublin), when writing about Crossings, concurred with Groener's visual imagery of road and journey to depict the evolution of the self. "The lines are paths of experience" – Martí Peran on Groener's work. Groener's approach resonates with Freudian or Lacanian theory, with works signalling the danger of losing the individual in the collective or the unknown, but with the same or related works pointing towards disconnect or disintegration at the level of the person. Patrick T. Murphy, Director of the RHA, writing about Groener's State at the RHA, puts it thus: "...the universal task of situating the self upon this earth. How do we figure ourselves within the societal, the geopolitical, the global?"

=== Later Work ===
Since 2015, Groener's practice has expanded into sculptural installations that utilise natural and found materials, such as twigs, twine, paper, and cardboard. Her solo exhibition "Citizen" at the Butler Gallery, Kilkenny (2016), "addressed one of the most pressing issues of our time–the refugee crisis–and our response to it".

Confronted by bloody conflicts, forced migrations, and enduring injustices of current history, her work reflects a deepening exploration of the interconnectedness of individual and universal experiences. Her solo exhibition, “The Past is a Foreign Country” (2018–2019) was described by critic Aiden Dunne in The Irish Times as "An austere, biting and effective response to the experience of war, forced migration, refugee camps caused by the war in Syria”.

In Artforum, Gemma Tipton noted that the installation “hinges on an act of symbolic cruelty that drives home its point,” describing twenty suspended birch stems, stripped of branches and reconfigured into fragile networks that “hover uselessly above the floor.” The piece, she wrote, “conveys something of the vehemence of feeling bound up in Groener's approach to her subject matter.”

“Groener's social-political work focuses on the fragility of life and questions systemic injustices” according to Sunday Independent critic Niall MacMonagle [18]. In 2024, Groener presented “State [Europa]”, a piece that “symbolises the current immigration crisis, the displacement of people, their misery, confusion and heartbreak,”

== Film and Animation ==
Groener also works with film and animation. Her first video work was shown in Crossing in 2006, in the Royal Hibernian Academy, Dublin, Ireland. Her first animation Somewhere Else, was shown in the Kilkenny Arts Festival in 2012. Her installation The Past is a Foreign Country (2018–2019) included a series of animated drawings collectively titled Moments, based on testimonies of children affected by the war in Syria, created in collaboration with journalist Razan Ibraheem.

More recently, she created Shelter (2024), an animated video made in collaboration with filmmaker Matt Kresling and the Talbot Interfaith Shelter. Drawing from personal narratives, Shelter explores themes of perseverance and community, echoing Groener's ongoing engagement with belonging, memory, and the human capacity to endure. The film premiered as part of her exhibition at the Academy Art Museum in Easton, MD. It was also screened at the 2025 Chesapeake Film Festival at the Ebenezer Theatre.

== Collections ==
Groener's work is represented in the collections of The Irish Museum of Modern Art; the Arts Council of Ireland; the State Art Collection, Ireland; C21 Museum Hotels, USA; VU University Medical Centre, Amsterdam; DELA Insurance, The Netherlands; Sun Communities, USA; The Law Library of Ireland; The National Drawing Archive Ireland; The Contemporary Irish Art Society; AIB Bank; ABN-AMRO Bank; and private collections in the US, Ireland, The Netherlands, Germany, Italy, Switzerland, and Belgium.

== Exhibitions ==
Groener exhibits in solo exhibitions both in Ireland, and internationally. Most notably Crossing (2006), RHA Gallery and Rubicon Gallery Dublin, Ireland; State (2013), RHA Gallery, Dublin, Ireland; Citizen (2016), Butler Gallery, Kilkenny, Ireland; The Past Is A Foreign Country (2018–2019), The Dock, Carrick-on Shannon, The Lab Gallery, Dublin; and West Cork Arts Centre, Skibbereen, Ireland; To the Edge of Your World (2023–Present), Centre Culturel Irlandais, Paris, France; Museum Rijswijk, The Hague, the Netherlands; Highlanes Gallery, Drogheda, Ireland; The Academy Art Museum, Easton, MD, USA; and will show in Bader + Simon Gallery, Cincinnati in 2026.

Groener has also participated in notable group exhibitions such as Refuge: Needing, Seeking, Creating Shelter, 21c Lexington (2025–26), 21c Durham, 21c Cincinnati, 21c Bentonville, USA; Drawing Now (2019) Paris, France; Say The Dream Was Real and the Wall Imaginary (2022), Jane Lombard Gallery, New York, USA; The Narrow Gate of the Here and Now (2022), Irish Museum of Modern Art, Dublin, Ireland; No Access (2022), Viewmaster Projects, 22 video artworks on border conflicts and migration, former NATO headquarters Cannerberg, Maastricht, the Netherlands; Paper Biennale (2022), Museum Rijswijk, the Netherlands; Continuous Regeneration (2019), Columbia Circle, Shanghai, China; Continuous Refle(a)ction(2019), Riverside Art Museum, Beijing, China; Sight & Sounds of Ireland (2018), Dupont Underground, Washington DC., USA; Taboo(2018), Poggiali & Forconi Gallery, Florence, Italy; All About Drawing | 100 Dutch artists (2011), Stedelijk Museum Schiedam, the Netherlands; Into Irish Drawing (2009), Limerick City Arts Gallery, Limerick Ireland; Civic Arts Gallery Hengelo, The Netherlands; Centre Culturel Irlandais Paris, France; Millennium Court Arts Centre Portadown, Northern Ireland; PAN Amsterdam (2017–2025), Art Miami (2016–2018), Miami, USA; Art on Paper (2017–2019), New York, USA; Volta Basel (2018), Basel, Switzerland;

== Bibliography ==
- Wolin, J.(ed) and Marle, T(trans). (2009). Tipping/point. ISBN 978-0-9554084-8-9
- Kissane, S., Wolin, J., Lynch, S., Sirr, P. (2018). The Past is a Foreign Country. Limerick City Gallery of Art. ISBN 978-0-9927969-3-8
- Benson, C., Hanrahan S. (2006) Crossing. Royal Hibernian Academy. ISBN 1-903875-29-3
