= Michael Byrne (artist) =

Irish painter (1923–1989)

- Born: 1923; Dublin, Ireland
- Died: 1989 (aged 65–66)
- Education: National College of Art and Design
- Known for: Painting

Michael Byrne (1923–1989) was an Irish painter. He was elected to the Irish artists' academy, Aosdána, and worked for both the Irish Arts Council and the National College of Art and Design.

== Life ==
=== Early life and education ===
Byrne was born in Dublin in 1923, to Michael and Mary (née Sloane) Byrne. He had 9 siblings.

He was employed by a photographer and as a dental technician. He later studied at the National College of Art and Design in Dublin, from 1944 to 1945, and subsequently at King Alfred's College, Winchester, UK.

=== Artistic career ===
Byrne started his public career with Dublin-related subjects. He later worked on abstract pieces in oil and watercolours, and still later focused on the making of fine silkscreen pieces.

He was a co-founder of the Independent Artists group, and of the Black Church Print Studio, where he served as founding director, and taught. He also served on the executive committee of the Project Arts Centre in Dublin.

With multiple exhibitions, he released a number of lithographs and silkscreens, and his original work is held in various collections, including those of the Government of Ireland (noted as present in at least two embassies), the Arts Council of Ireland, the Oregon Gallery of Modern Art and that of Coras Iompair Eireann.

He worked for the Arts Council, though it appears not in a permanent role, and as a lecturer at the National College of Art and Design.

=== Recognition ===
Byrne was elected as a member of the artists' affiliation / academy Aosdána by his peers.

=== Death and legacy ===
Byrne travelled widely but remained based in his family home in Cabra, Dublin, and never married. He died suddenly 25 January 1989. An award for printmakers is made every two years in his name.

== Exhibitions ==
Byrne exhibited over many years at a range of venues, including:

=== Group shows ===
- Irish Exhibition of Living Art (1953)
- Royal Hibernian Academy (1958, 1973)
- Independent Artists (multiple occasions)
- Project Arts Centre (Abbey Street, Dublin; 1968–71)
- Setanta Gallery (1974, 1976, 1981)
- Davis Gallery (1982)
- Solomon Gallery (1989)

=== Individual shows ===
- Dublin (various venues)
- Inglewood Library Gallery, Los Angeles (1966)
- Tara Gallery, Zürich (1981)

A memorial exhibition was held in 1990 at the Davis Gallery.
