= Marie Foley =

Irish sculptor and installation artist (born 1959)

- Born: 1959 (age 66–67); Kanturk, County Cork, Ireland
- Education: Crawford Municipal College of Art and Design
- Known for: Sculpture, installation art
- Elected: Aosdána (1996)
- Website: mariefoley.com

Marie Foley (born October 1959) is an Irish artist, working in the disciplines of sculpture and installation art. She is a member of Ireland's academy of artists, Aosdána. Her work has won a number of awards.

== Early life and education ==
Foley was born in Kanturk, County Cork, in October 1959. She studied at the Crawford Municipal College of Art and Design in the city of Cork. After graduation, she began teaching in a secondary school. In 1986, she won an Arts Council award which she used to attend Goldsmiths College in London.

She later enrolled in the Cardiff College of Art; where she secured an M.A. in Fine Arts, specialised in Sculpture, at Cardiff in 1987.

== Career and work ==
Foley is chiefly known for her work, initially in sculpture and later also in installation art. She uses wood, porcelain, stone, glass and metal, including salvaged materials. Her work is influenced by early cultures including the Indigenous peoples of the Americas, Eskimo, and Druidic and how cultures interpret symbolism in nature.

Her work has been exhibited at a range of group and solo shows across a dozen or more countries. Among these were the first solo show of an Irish artist at the Irish Museum of Modern Art (IMMA), as well as Cork's Crawford Art Gallery and Dublin's Hugh Lane Gallery. In 1990, her works were organized into a touring exhibition by the Project Arts Centre.

== Recognition ==
Foley was elected to Ireland's academy or affiliation of artists, Aosdána, in 1996. She has received support and recognition from the Arts Council, and has won multiple awards from other bodies.
