= Neil Donnelly =

Irish playwright (b. 1946)

- Born: 1946; Tullamore, Ireland
- Writing career
- Language: English
- Years active: 1974–present
- Notable works: The Silver Dollar Boys; Upstarts; The Duty Master

Neil Donnelly (born 1946 in Tullamore, County Offaly, Ireland) is a playwright and poet. He is a member of Aosdána, an association of Irish artists.

== Career ==
In the 1970s Donnelly founded "Wheels," a theatre in education company that toured Great Britain. Donnelly has written over 20 plays for stage and radio. He won the Harvey's Irish Theatre Award for Best Play in 1981 was the Abbey Theatre's writer-in-association in 1994. He has also held writer-in-residence posts in County Mayo (1993) and County Kildare (1999). Several of his works depict the Irish diaspora in England. In 2019 he directed a documentary about Aidan Higgins.

== Personal life ==
Donnelly lives in County Kildare.

== Selected works ==
=== Poetry ===
- Tullamore Train (2012)

=== Documentary film ===
- Where Would You Like The Bullet? (2019)
