= John Kelly (Irish artist) =

Irish painter

John Kelly RHA
- Born: 1932; Dublin, Ireland
- Died: 2006 (aged 73–74); Dublin, Ireland
- Education: National College of Art and Design
- Known for: printmaking
- Elected: Aosdána

John Kelly RHA (1932–2006) was an Irish artist.

Kelly was born in Dublin in 1932. He studied at the National College of Art and Design. He was director of the Graphic Studio in Dublin for more than 10 years and was a founding member of the Black Church Print Studio. He also lectured in printmaking at National College of Art & Design.

Kelly was a member of Aosdána.
