= Rita Ann Higgins =

Irish writer

Rita Ann Higgins (born 1955) is an Irish poet and playwright.

== Early life ==
A native of Ballybrit, Galway, Higgins was one of eleven children in a working-class household. She went to Briarhill National School, and Sisters of Mercy Convent, Galway. She married in 1973 but following the birth of her second child in 1977, contracted tuberculosis, forcing her to spend an extended period in a sanatorium.

While confined, she began reading, and took to composing poems. She joined the Galway Writers' Workshop in 1982. Jessie Lendennie, editor of Salmon Publishing, encouraged Higgins and oversaw the publication of her first five collections.

== Career ==
Higgins was Galway County's Writer-in-Residence in 1987, Writer in Residence at the National University of Ireland, Galway, in 1994–95, Writer in Residence for Offaly County Council in 1998–99. She was Green Honors Professor at Texas Christian University, in October 2000. Other awards include a Peadar O'Donnell Award in 1989, several Arts Council bursaries 'Sunny Side Plucked' was a Poetry Book Society Recommendation. She was made an honorary fellow at Hong Kong Baptist University in November 2006.

== Personal life ==
Higgins is a member of Aosdána, though the group turned her down five times previously. She cites the feminist, Mary Wollstonecraft, and the Irish Republican, Mary MacSwiney, as role models. She lives in Galway and An Spidéal.

== Selected works ==
=== Poetry ===
- Goddess on the Mervue Bus, Salmon Poetry, 1986
- Witch in the Bushes, Salmon Poetry, 1988
- Goddess and Witch, Salmon Poetry, 1990
- Philomena's Revenge, Salmon Poetry, 1992
- Higher Purchase, Salmon Poetry, 1996
- Sunny Side Plucked: New & Selected Poems, Bloodaxe Books, 1996
- An Awful Racket, Bloodaxe Books, 2001
- Throw in the Vowels: New & Selected Poems, Bloodaxe Books, 2005; 2nd edition 2010 with audio CD
- Hurting God: Prose & Poems, Salmon Poetry, 2010
- Ireland Is Changing Mother, Bloodaxe Books, 2011
- Tongulish, Bloodaxe Books, 2016
- Our Killer City, Salmon Poetry, 2018
- Pathogens Love a Patsy - Pandemic and Other Poems, Salmon Poetry, 2020

=== Plays ===
- Face Licker Come Home, 1991
- God of the Hatch Man, 1992
- Colie Lally Doesn't Live in a Bucket, 1993
- Down All the Roundabouts, 1999
- The Empty Frame, 2008
- The Plastic Bag, 2008
- The Empty Frame, 2008
- The Colossal Longing of Julie Connors, 2014

=== Screenplay ===
- The Big Break, 2004
- Straois/The Smirk, 2018

== See also ==
- Ó hUiginn
- Sullivan, Moynagh. "'"Looking at Being Someone": Class and Gender in the Poetry of Rita Ann Higgins'". Academia.edu.
