= Edward Delaney =

Irish sculptor

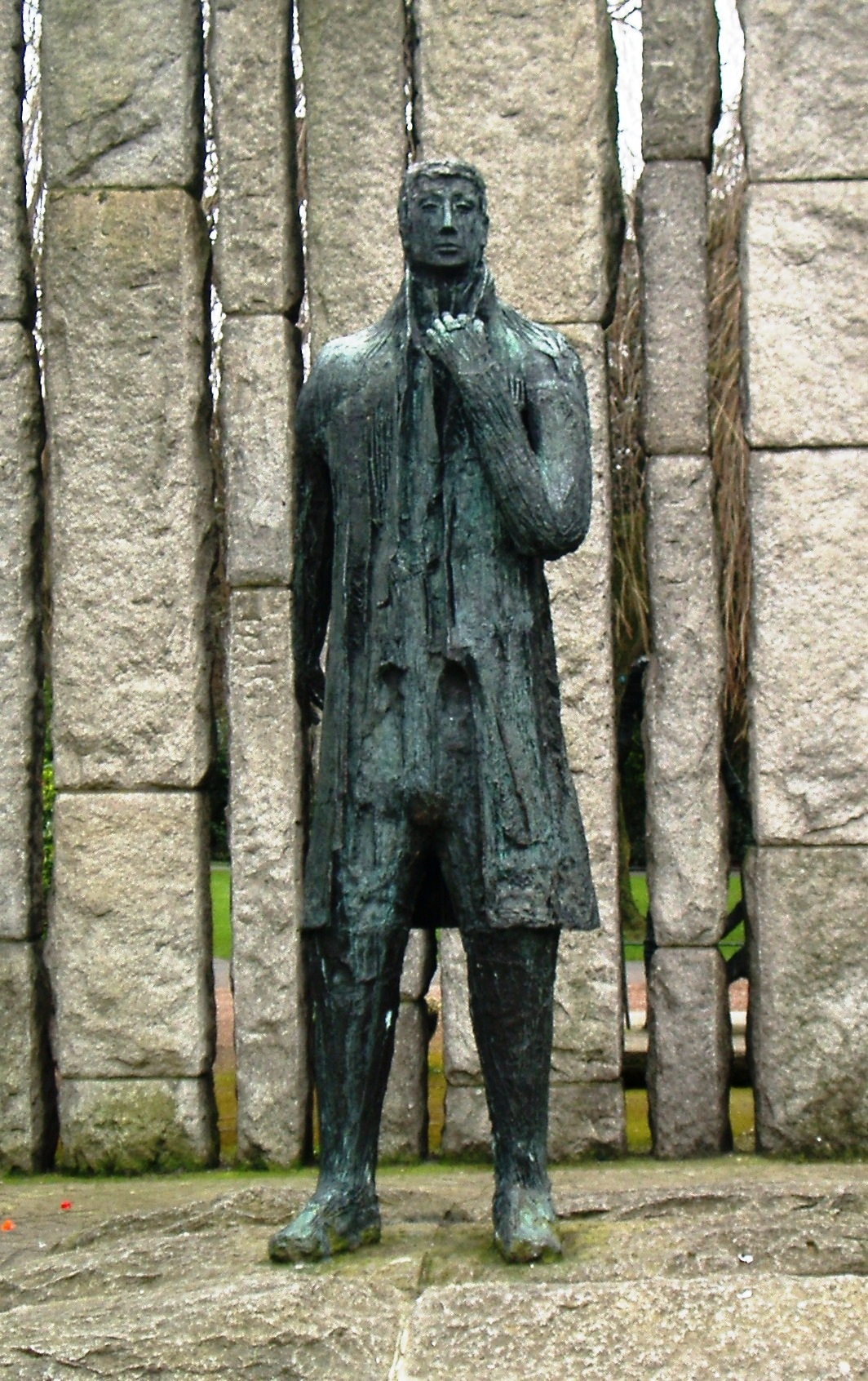
Wolfe Tone

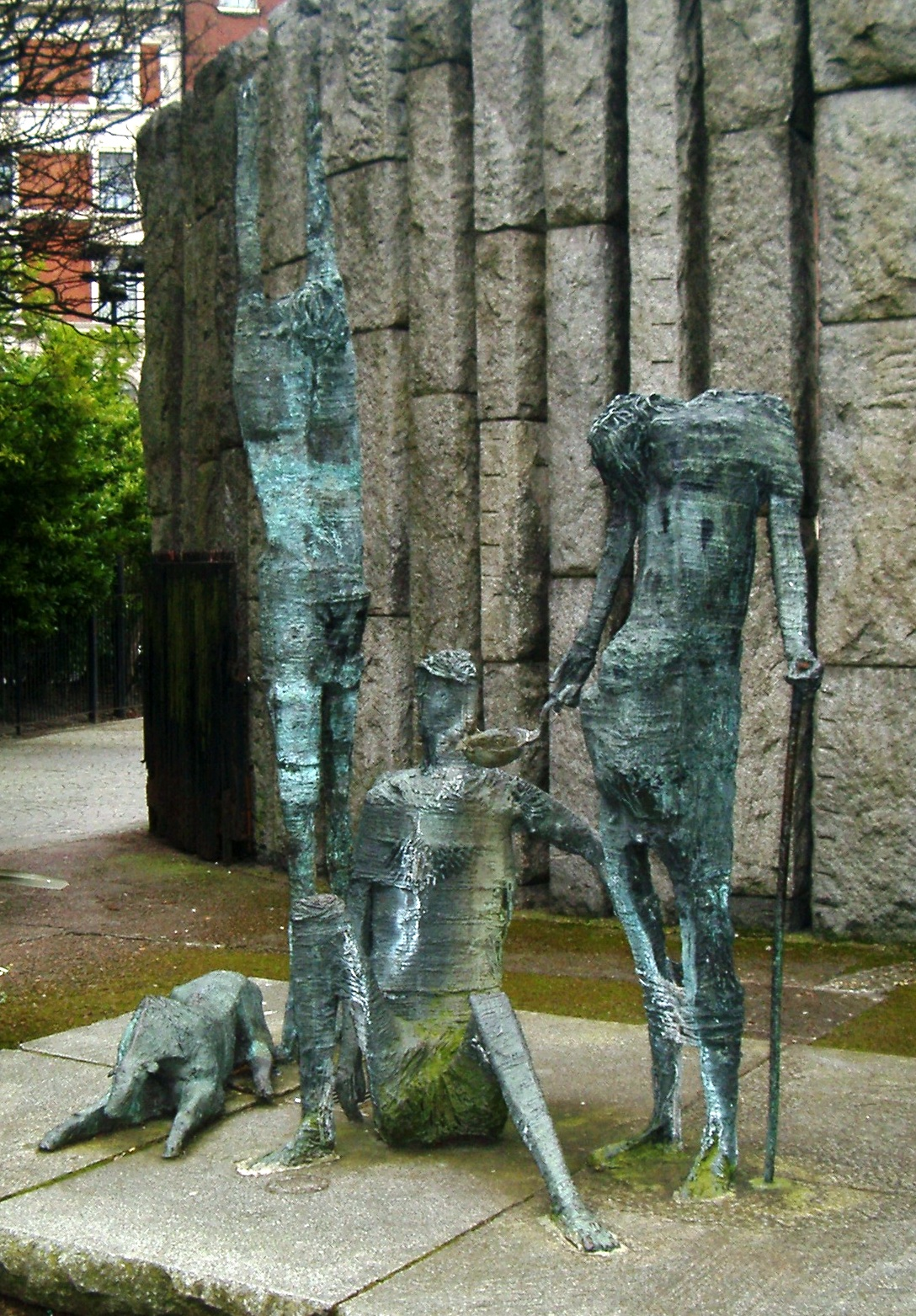
The famine memorial behind Wolfe Tone

Edward Delaney (1930 – 22 September 2009) was an Irish sculptor born in Claremorris in County Mayo in 1930. His best-known works include the 1967 statue of Wolfe Tone and famine memorial at the northeastern corner of St Stephen's Green in Dublin and the statue of Thomas Davis in College Green, opposite Trinity College Dublin. These are both examples of lost-wax bronze castings, his main technique during the 1960s and early 1970s.

== Biography, early successes and awards ==
Edward Delaney attended the National College of Art and Design in Dublin and, supported by the Irish Arts Council, studied casting in Germany. He represented Ireland at the Biennale de Paris in 1959 and 1961.

He represented Ireland at the Paris Biennale (1959 and 1961) and at the World Fair in New York (1965). He has also shown in New York, Tokyo, Buenos Aires, and Budapest. At home, he exhibited in the Hendriks, Royal Hibernian Academy, Davis and Solomon Galleries, and in the Project Arts Centre, amongst others.

Some of his awards and scholarships include a West German fellowship for sculpture (1956–57); the Bavarian State Foreign Students Sculpture Prize (1958); the Italian Government Scholarship for sculpture (1959–60); the Arts Council of Ireland Sculpture prizes (1962 and 1964); and the Royal Hibernian Academy Award for Sculpture of Distinction in Bronze (1991).

Delaney married Nancy O'Brien in 1961 with whom he had five children. When his marriage broke up, around 1980, he moved to Galway. There he met Dr Anne Gillen, by whom he had two children. He was a member of Aosdána. He died on 22 September 2009, at the age of 79.

His firstborn, Eamon Delaney unveiled a sculpted monument in his honour in 2013. His daughter, Catherine Delaney, is also an artist and a member of Aosdána.

== Style ==
Though they do exhibit some of his trademark expressionism, the statues of Wolfe Tone and Thomas Davis are less abstract than was most of his work at the time; the famine memorial is more typical in this regard. However, arts writer Judith Hill points out that these statues make no attempt at an exact likeness of the figures they portray, instead, they communicate the public stature of their subjects and, indeed, the public role of memorial statues through their proportions and scale. In this way, it is argued, they mark the transition from memorial and public art.

What all Edward Delaney's work shares is robustness, in an Irish Times review of his 2004 retrospective, arts writer Aidan Dunne described his bronzes as robust but having an awkwardness, a tenderness about them.

From 1980 onwards, Edward Delaney concentrated on large-scale environmental pieces and stainless steel works in Carraroe, County Galway. The Royal Hibernian Academy held a retrospective of his work in 1992 and again in 2004.

== Major collections ==
Works are in many major collections, including the Central Bank of Ireland, Dublin; Bank of Ireland; Allied Irish Banks; Hugh Lane Municipal Gallery of Modern Art, Dublin; Ulster Museum, Belfast; Waterford Museum; Office of Public Works, Dublin; First National Bank of Chicago; First National City Bank of New York; An Chomhairle Ealaíon/The Irish Arts Council; KLM Airlines Headquarters, New York; Irish Management Institute, Dublin; Jefferson Smurfit Group Ltd.; Norman B.Arnoff, New York; University College, Dublin, and the Abbey Theatre, Dublin.

A large body of Delaney's work was formerly to be seen at the Open Air Sculpture Park in Carraroe in the west of Ireland.

An example of the work of the late Edward Delaney RHA was unveiled in his native town of Crossboyne, Claremorris, County Mayo, Ireland on Saturday, 6 July 2013. The sculpture entitled 'Integration' comprises an abstract stainless steel globe and has been donated by the family. It was situated in a specially developed park, opposite Crossboyne church, near Claremorris, which has also been donated by the family. The public sculpture was unveiled by Edward's son the author and journalist Eamon Delaney at the event attended by many of the late artist's family, friends and neighbours.

== See also ==
- List of public art in Dublin
- List of public art in Cork city
