= Mary O'Donnell =

Novelist and poet, a journalist, broadcaster and teacher

- Born: 1954 (age 71–72); Monaghan, Ireland
- Education: St. Louis Convent
- Alma mater: St. Patrick's College, Maynooth University College Cork (Ph.D)
- Occupations: Poet, novelist, short story writer
- Writing career
- Pen name: Mary O'Donnell
- Website: maryodonnell.com

Mary O'Donnell (born 1954) is an Irish novelist and poet, journalist, broadcaster and teacher.

== Biography ==
O'Donnell was born in County Monaghan and was raised close to the border with Northern Ireland. Her Kilkenny-born father held a B. Ag from University College Cork, and transferred to Monaghan to become Town of Monaghan Co-op's first Catholic General Manager in 1947. Her Monaghan-born mother Maureen (née Macklin) was an accomplished singer and actor on the amateur circuit. She has one sistet, Margaret (b. 1960). O'Donnell was educated at St. Louis Secondary School, Monaghan and attended college at St. Patrick's College, Maynooth(NUI), now Maynooth University. There she gained a degree in German and philosophy and an MA in German studies, followed by a First Class Hons Higher Diploma in education, which she used to become a language and drama teacher. In 2019 she was conferred with a PhD in Creative Writing from UCC. She is married to Martin Nugent, former Assistant Headmaster of Clongowes Wood College. They have one daughter, Anna O'Donnell Nugent. They live in County Kildare.

O'Donnell left teaching to work as a Drama Critic and journalist for the Sunday Tribune (1988–1991). During that period, her literary output increased. She became a regular contributor to The Irish Times, The Irish Independent and Raidió Teilifís Éireann (RTÉ) as well as to various literary journals. Her first novel, The Light-Makers, was an Irish best-seller and won the Sunday Tribune's Best New Irish Novel for 1992.

She has written and published six novels, including The Elysium Testament and Where They Lie, and Sweep the Cobwebs off the Sky (Époque Press UK), ten collections of poetry (including Those April Fevers Arc UK 2015 and "Massacre of the Birds", Salmon 2020), and four volumes of short stories. She has also taken part in several RTE radio programmes she scripted and presented, and won several awards for her writing in both fiction and poetry. In 2007 she was writer-in-residence at the Princess Grace Irish Library in Monaco. Her work has been translated into Hungarian, for which she was co-recipient of the 2012 Irodalmi Jelen Award for Translation. Most recently, her poetry has been translated into Brazilian Portuguese and her short stories into Spanish (in Argentina). The work Giving Shape to the Moment: the Art of Mary O'Donnell, Poet, Novelist & Short-story Writer includes a selection of essays responding to her writing in each genre, an interview from Irish academic Dr Anne Fogarty, and offers a powerful overview of her contribution to Irish letters.

O'Donnell has taught creative writing at Maynooth University, was a mentor on the Carlow University, Pittsburgh MFA in Creative Writing programme for eleven years, and also contributed to the faculty of the University of Iowa's summer writing programme at Trinity College, Dublin for three years. She also taught Poetry and Fiction for three years on Galway University's MA in Creative Writing. She is a former member of the Irish Writers' Union, a former Board Member of the Irish Writers Centre, a member of Aosdána and served for three years on Maynooth University's Governing Authority, representing arts and culture.

O'Donnell has been a judge for the International IMPAC Dublin Literary Award, the Hennessy Literary Award, the Strokestown International Poetry Competition, Poetry Now and the Irish Times/Mountains to Sea Poetry Prize.

She is represented by the Marianne Gunne O'Connor Literary Agency.

== Awards ==
- Sunday Tribune Best New Irish Novel in 1992,
- The William Allingham Award.
- The Listowel Writers’ Week Short Story Prize.
- Hennessy Literary Award shortlisting, 1989.
- Prize-winner in the V.S. Pritchett Short Story Competition (UK), 2000.
- Frank O'Connor International Short Story Prize shortlisting, 2008
- The FISH International Short Story Award, 2011
- Runner up, FISH International Poetry Competition, 2023.
- Runner-up, Cardiff International Poetry Competition, 2011
- Winner of the Irodälmi Jelen translation prize.
- President's Alumni Award at NUI Maynooth 2011.
- Irish Times Literature Awards – nominated twice.

== Bibliography ==
=== Novels ===
- The Light-Makers (Poolbeg, 1992 & 1993)
- Virgin and the Boy (Poolbeg, 1996)
- The Elysium Testament (Trident Press UK, 1999)
- Where They Lie (New Island Books, 2014)
- Sister Caravaggio, collaborative novel with Peter Cunningham, Neil Donnelly and others (Liberties Press, 2014)
- Sweep the Cobwebs off the Sky (Epoque Press 2026)

=== Short story collections ===
- Strong Pagans (Poolbeg, 1991)
- Storm Over Belfast (New Island Books, 2008)
- Empire (Arlen House, 2018)
- Walking Ghosts (Mercier Press, 2025)

=== Poetry ===
- Reading the Sunflowers in September (Salmon, 1990)
- Spiderwoman’s Third Avenue Rhapsody (Salmon 1993)
- Unlegendary Heroes (Salmon 1998)
- September Elegies (Lapwing, Belfast, 2003)
- The Place of Miracles, New & Selected Poems (New Island Books, 2005)
- "The Ark Builders", (Arc Publications UK, 2009)
- Csodák földje, Hungarian edition of New & Selected Poems (Irodalmi Jelen Konyvek, translator Dr. Tamas Kabdebo, 2011)
- Those April Fevers, (Arc Publications UK, 2015)

'Outsiders, Always', chapbook from Southword Publishing, 2023

=== Translations ===
- To the Winds Our Sails, editor with Manuela Palacios, (Salmon, 2010)
