= Mary O'Malley (poet) =

Irish poet (born 1954)

- Born: 1954 (age 71–72); Connemara, Galway, Ireland
- Education: University College Galway, Galway
- Occupation: Poet

Mary O'Malley (born 1954 in Connemara, Ireland) is an Irish poet whose work has been published in various literary magazines. She has published seven poetry books since 1990 and her poems have been translated into several languages.

== Life ==
Mary O'Malley was born in Connemara, in the west of Ireland, and is a native Irish speaker. She was educated at University College, Galway. She spent eight years living in Portugal, where she taught at the Universidade Nova de Lisboa. She returned to Ireland in the late 1980s, beginning a poetry career in 1990.

She lives near the village of Moycullen. She teaches on the MA in Writing at the National University of Ireland, Galway. She has held the Heimbold Chair of Irish Studies at Villanova University in Pennsylvania. She has also held writing residencies at the Irish College in Paris, Tarragona, Spain and Manhattanville College, New York.

Her work has been published in Krino, Poetry Ireland, The Seneca Review, Atlanta Review, Da Braake Honde, Lictungen, The Lifelines Anthology and the Review of Irish American Studies.

She read at the 2009 Dublin Book Festival.

She was Arts Council Writer-in-Residence at the University of Limerick in 2016.

She is an elected member of Aosdána, the Irish national association of creative artists.

== Awards ==
- 1990 - Hennessy Award winner
- 2009 - 13th annual Lawrence O'Shaughnessy Award
- 2018 - Joint winner, Michael Hartnett Poetry Award (Playing the Octopus)
- 2021 - Honorary degree, National University of Ireland, Galway

== Works ==
- "Macchu Picchu, Inis Mór"; "Canvas Currach II", ASYLUM ROAD
- "A Cautionary Tale"

=== Books ===
- A Consideration of Silk, Salmon Poetry Galway, 1990
- Where the Rocks Float, Salmon, Galway, 1993
- The Knife in the Wave, Salmon Co.Clare, 1997
- Asylum Road, Salmon Publishing, 2001
- The Boning Hall (New & Selected), Manhester: Carcanet Press, 2002
- A Perfect V, Manchester: Carcanet Press, Manchester, 2006.
- Valparaiso, Manchester: Carcanet Press, 2012.
- Playing the Octopus, Manchester: Carcanet Press, 2016
- Gaudent Angeli, Manhester: Carcanet Press, 2019

=== Anthology ===
- Three Irish Poets, Manhester: Carcanet Press Ltd. 2003, ISBN 978-1-85754-683-5
- SALMON: A Journey in Poetry 1981-2007, edited by Jessie Lendennie
- The Making of a Poem: a Norton Anthology of Poetic Forms, edited by Eavan Boland and Mark Strand, W. W. Norton & Company; Reprint edition (April 2001)
