= Margaret Irwin West =

Irish painter

- Born: Margaret Irwin; 1926 (age 99–100); Central Provinces, British India
- Education: Atelier of André Lhote
- Known for: Etching, printmaking
- Spouse: Rodney West (m. 1957)
- Children: 4
- Elected: Aosdána
- Website: margaretirwinwest.com

Margaret "Mo" Irwin West (born 1926; née Irwin) is an Indian-born Irish printmaker.

== Early life ==
Margaret Irwin was born in the Central Provinces of British India in 1926 to Anglo-Irish parents. Her father was from County Roscommon and worked in the Indian Civil Service. She lived in County Wicklow from the age of nine, and was taught drawing by Lilian Davidson. She studied languages at Trinity College, Dublin.

== Career ==
Irwin West studied at the atelier of André Lhote in Paris. Later, she studied at the Graphic Studio Dublin. She works in etching, chine-collé, intaglio and painting. She taught at the National College of Art and Design (NCAD, Dublin) from 1982 to 1991.

She was elected to Aosdána in 2019.

== Personal life ==
Margaret Irwin married Rodney West in 1957; they had two children. She lives in Claddaghduff, Connemara.
