= Basil Goulding =

Irish art collector and sportsman (1909–1982)

- Born: 4 November 1909; Dublin, Ireland
- Died: January 16, 1982 (aged 72)
- Education: Winchester College, Christ Church, Oxford
- Occupations: Businessperson, art collector, architect, cricketer
- Employer: Fitzwilton
- Spouse: Valerie Goulding
- Children: 3, including Tim

Sir William Basil Goulding, 3rd Baronet (4 November 1909 – 16 January 1982) was an Irish art collector, cricketer, squash player, industrialist, prominent businessman and amateur architect.

== Personal life ==
He was born in Dublin, Ireland. He was educated at Winchester College, and later at Christ Church, Oxford. He had ambitions of architecture, but instead inherited the family business W & HM Goulding Ltd . He succeeded his father as Chairperson in 1935. In this role, Goulding proved an adept businessman and also sat on the boards of many companies.

Goulding was an important art collector of contemporary art in Ireland and was renowned for his extensive collection which was dispersed posthumously. He championed up and coming artists, and held several well known names in his collection. Additionally, he created some important corporate commission opportunities for emerging contemporary artists.

In 1939 he married Valerie Goulding having met at the Fairyhouse Races. She was an Irish campaigner for people with disabilities, the founder of the Central Remedial Clinic in Dublin and senator. Together, they had three sons, Hamilton, Timothy (an artist and musician) and Lingard. The family lived in Enniskerry, County Wicklow in a property with extensive gardens. Sir Basil Goulding had a keen interest in gardening and regularly hosted fundraising events there. The family home was also the location where Sir Basil Goulding had the notable 'Goulding Summer House' built by Scott Tallon Walker architects.

During World War II, Goulding was commissioned as a pilot officer in the Royal Air Force. By the end of 1942 he had reached the rank of wing commander. Lady Valerie's father, Sir Walter Monckton was a lawyer, and was the UK Attorney General during the Edward VIII abdication crisis, later serving as a British Member of Parliament for Bristol West, serving as defence minister and Paymaster General. He also played cricket, and played one first-class match for a combined Oxford/Cambridge University team. He was later president of the MCC in 1956.

Sir Basil's uncle was chairman of Rolls-Royce.

== Contributions to Irish Public life ==
=== The Arts Council ===
The Arts Act of 1951 established the Arts Council in response to the Bodkin Report which outlined the sad condition of the arts in Ireland. Sir Basil Goulding was a co-opted member of the council from its formative years and was instrumental in acting on many of its policies.

=== Contemporary Irish Art Society ===
Goulding was the founding Chairperson of the Contemporary Irish Art Society in 1962, along with Gordon Lambert, Cecil King, Stanley Mosse, James White and Michael Scott. The enthusiasm and vision of these founding members of the society was the catalyst which led to the development of many important art collections in Ireland. The purpose of the society was to encourage a greater level of patronage of living Irish artists which, at the time, was extremely low. This was mainly achieved by raising funds to purchase artworks by living artists, which were then donated to public collections. The first purchase in 1962 was an important painting by Patrick Scott, donated to the Hugh Lane Municipal Gallery of Modern Art. Over the following 12 years the society purchased 37 works for the Hugh Lane Municipal Gallery, until in 1974, Dublin Corporation started to provide an annual purchasing fund for the gallery.

=== Kilkenny Design Workshops ===
Following completion of the report 'Design in Ireland', the Kilkenny Design Workshops (KDW) was set up in 1963. It primarily endeavoured to nurture native Irish crafts particularly in the fields of textiles, metalwork, ceramics, glass and furniture to have a modern yet distinctly Irish sensibility. The KDW was the first State sponsored design agency in the world and was held as a model of governmental intervention in design. Sir Basil Goulding sat on the board of the KDW from its origination and fulfilled the role of chairperson from 1977 until 1981.

== Championing Art ==
=== Collecting Irish artists ===
Sir Basil Goulding was deeply involved in the arts as a collector, sponsor, and benefactor. He carefully and thoughtfully collected pieces of art, and amassed a large and important collection which showcased much of the work being produced in Ireland at the time. He bought paintings and sculptures by many notable creatives such as Jack Butler Yeats, Patrick Scott (artist). He particularly championed the work of Barrie Cooke and Camille Souter and owned many of their works.

=== Commissioning Irish artists ===
Sir Basil Goulding used his influence as a successful businessman to create opportunities for artists to complete corporate commissions. In 1967 he commissioned Michael Farrell to create murals for the National Bank of Ireland, College Green during his time as director of the bank. In the unveiling of the artwork, Sir Basil said "It is known that a Bank means all things to all men, but to the best of my knowledge this is a rare occasion in that the Bank is here acting as patron."

In 1969 he commissioned artworks for Fitzwilton House by Irish and British artists, Robert Ballagh, Barrie Cooke, Anne Madden and Michael Farrell – some of which have since been transferred to the Trinity College Dublin Art Collection.

== Sport ==
=== Cricket ===
A right-handed batsman and wicket-keeper, he played twice for the Ireland cricket team against the MCC in 1934, the year in which his father was president of the Irish Cricket Union. He made his debut in July in a two-day match, scoring seven runs in the Ireland second innings and taking one catch in the MCC first innings. The following month, he played his only first-class match, not scoring in either innings.

=== Other Sport ===
In addition to playing cricket, he also represented Ireland at squash, and captained Oxford University at football. He was also a keen skier and continued to ski until near the end of his life.

== Professional life ==
=== W & HM Goulding Ltd. ===
W & HM Goulding Ltd was a well established fertiliser manufacturer in the 19th and 20th centuries in Ireland with facilities in Dublin and Cork. Basil inherited the family business and succeeded his father as chairperson in 1935.

In the 1850s, the business built a large factory in The Glen that was used to make phosphate fertilizers and the area became known as Goulding's Glen. The factory closed and was demolished in the mid-20th century and very little of it remains today. The land was donated to the people of Cork by Sir Basil Goulding in the late 1960s and was subsequently developed as an amenity park.

It also had premises in Dublin City. In 1962, a production facility in East Wall known as 'East Wall. Sulphac Ltd.' was opened and was jointly owned by W. and H.M. Goulding Ltd. and Freeport Sulpher Company of New York.

The company was eventually acquired by IAWS between 1985 and 1986 and now forms a subsidiary of Origin Enterprises.

Its main office building, Fitzwilton House was commissioned by Basil Goulding to a design by English architects, Shoolheifer & Burley and completed in 1969. It was a bold expression of modernist architecture with a complex layered façade incorporating at least five different concrete finishes forming a dramatic backdrop to Dublin's Grand Canal.

The building was demolished in 2018.

=== Other Business ===
His other directorships included the Bank of Ireland, Hibernian Insurance Co., Rio Tinto Zinc, Irish Times Ltd, Independent Newspapers, Irish Pensions Trust, Johnston Mooney and O'Brien, Massey Waterford Ltd, Irish Metal Industries.

Baronetage of the United Kingdom
Preceded by William Goulding	Baronet (of Millicent and Roebuck Hill); 1935–1982	Succeeded by Lingard Goulding
