= Anglo-Irish people =

Ethnic group and historical social class in Ireland

Anglo-Irish Angla-Éireannach
- St. Patrick's Saltire is often seen as an emblem of the Anglo-Irish.

Regions with significant populations
- Northern Ireland: 407,454 (2011) (Northern Irish Anglicans, Northern Irish Methodists, other Northern Irish Protestants)
- Republic of Ireland: 177,200 (2018) (Irish Anglicans, Irish Methodists, other Irish Protestants)

Languages
- English (Hiberno-English, Ulster English); Irish Sign Language; Northern Ireland Sign Language

Religion
- Mainly Anglicanism (Church of Ireland) and Methodism. Minority Congregationalist, Evangelical Protestantism, Pentecostal Christianity, Two by Twos, Christadelphianism, Plymouth Brethren, Exclusive Brethren, other Protestant, or Catholic. (see also Religion in Ireland)

Related ethnic groups
- English; Scots; Irish; Anglo-Normans; Anglo-Saxons; Ulster Scots; Ulster Protestants; Welsh

Anglo-Irish people (Irish: Angla-Éireannach) are an ethnic, social and religious grouping consisting mostly of the descendants and successors of the English Protestant Ascendancy in Ireland. The Anglo-Irish often defined themselves simply as "British", or less frequently as "Anglo-Irish", "Irish" or "English". Many became notable as administrators in the British Empire or as senior army and naval officers. The Kingdom of England and Great Britain were in a real union with the Kingdom of Ireland for over a century, before politically uniting into the United Kingdom of Great Britain and Ireland in 1801.

The Anglo-Irish are predominantly Anglicans belonging to the Church of Ireland (which was the established Church of Ireland until 1871) or to a lesser extent, to one of the English Dissenting denominations, such as Baptists or Methodists. However, some were Roman Catholics. The term is not applied to Presbyterians in the province of Ulster, whose ancestry is mostly Lowland Scottish, rather than English or Irish, and who are sometimes identified as Ulster Scots. The Anglo-Irish hold a wide range of political views, with some being outspoken Irish nationalists, but most overall being Unionists. And while most of the Anglo-Irish originated in the English diaspora in Ireland, others were descended from families of the old Gaelic nobility of Ireland.

== As a social class ==
The term "Anglo-Irish" is often applied to the members of the Church of Ireland who made up the professional and landed class in Ireland from the 17th century up to the time of Irish independence in the early 20th century. In the course of the 17th century, this Anglo-Irish landed class replaced the Gaelic Irish and Old English aristocracies as the ruling class in Ireland. They were also referred to as "New English" to distinguish them from the "Old English", who descended from the medieval Hiberno-Norman settlers.

Under the Penal Laws, which were in force between the 17th and 19th centuries (although enforced with varying degrees of severity), Roman Catholic recusants in Great Britain and Ireland were barred from holding public office, while in Ireland they were also barred from entry to Trinity College Dublin and from professions such as law, medicine, and the military. The lands of the recusant Roman Catholic landed gentry who refused to take the prescribed oaths were largely confiscated during the Plantations of Ireland. The rights of Roman Catholics to inherit landed property were severely restricted. Those who converted to the Church of Ireland were usually able to keep or regain their lost property, as the issue was considered primarily one of allegiance. In the late 18th century, the Parliament of Ireland in Dublin won legislative independence, and the movement for the repeal of the Test Acts began.

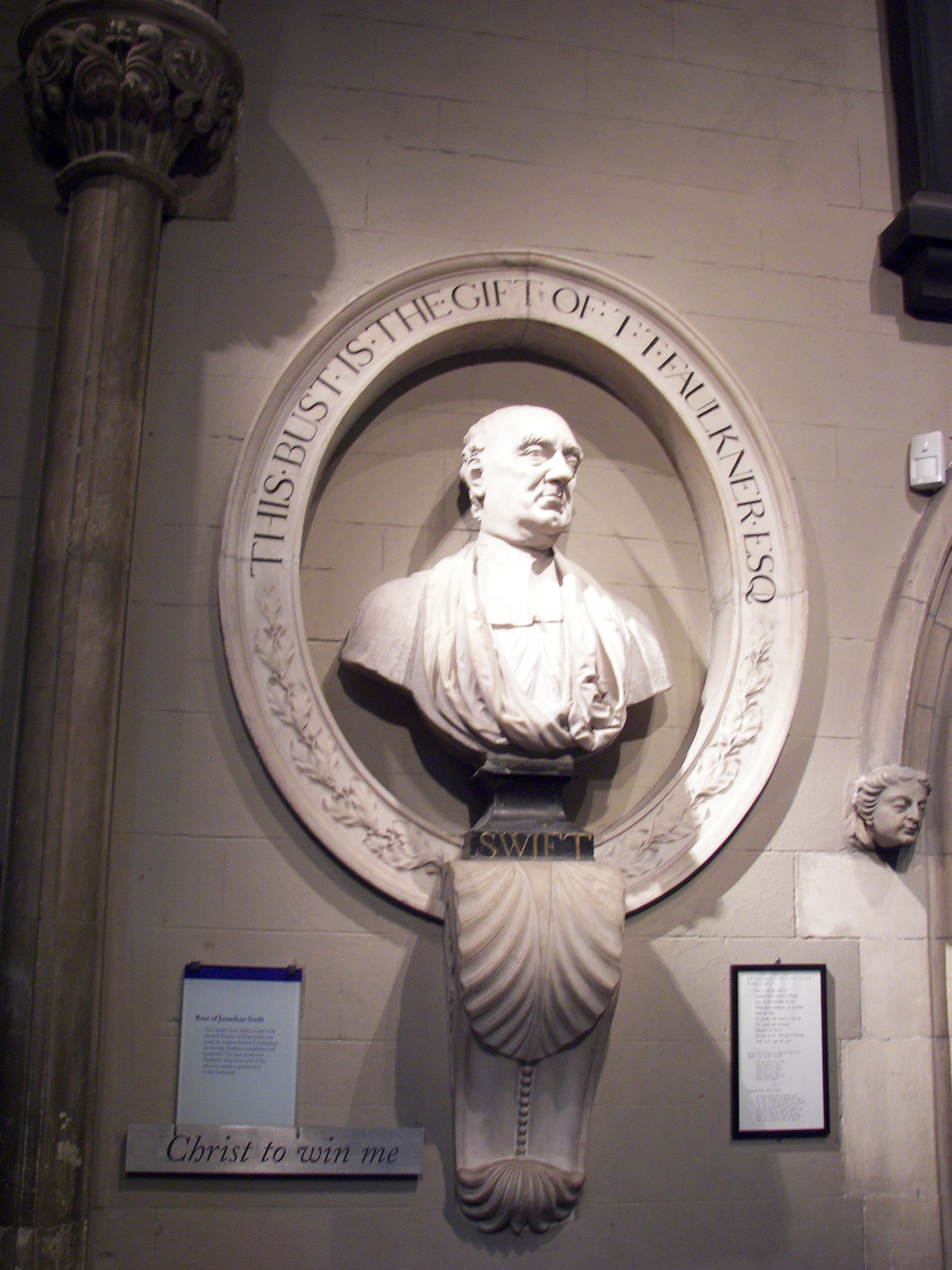
Marble bust of The V. Rev. Jonathan Swift, inside St Patrick's Cathedral, Dublin. Swift was Dean of St Patrick's from 1713 to 1745.

Not all Anglo-Irish people could trace their origins to the Protestant English settlers of the Cromwellian period; some were of Welsh stock, and others descended from Old English or even native Gaelic converts to Anglicanism. Members of this ruling class commonly identified themselves as Irish, while retaining English habits in politics, commerce, and culture. They participated in the popular English sports of the day, particularly racing and fox hunting, and intermarried with the ruling classes in Great Britain. Many of the more successful of them spent much of their careers either in Great Britain or in some part of the British Empire. Many constructed large country houses, which became known in Ireland as Big Houses, and these became symbolic of the class' dominance in Irish society.

The Dublin working class playwright Brendan Behan, a staunch Irish Republican, saw the Anglo-Irish as Ireland's leisure class and famously defined an Anglo-Irishman as "a Protestant with a horse".

The Anglo-Irish novelist and short story writer Elizabeth Bowen memorably described her experience as feeling "English in Ireland, Irish in England" and not accepted fully as belonging to either.

Due to their prominence in the military and their conservative politics, the Anglo-Irish have been compared to the Prussian Junker class by, among others, Correlli Barnett.

=== Business interests ===
At the beginning of the 20th century, the Anglo-Irish owned many of the major businesses in Ireland, such as Jacob's Biscuits, Bewley's, Beamish and Crawford, Jameson's Whiskey, W. P. & R. Odlum, Cleeve's, R&H Hall, Maguire & Patterson, Dockrell's, Arnott's, Goulding Chemicals, the Irish Times, the Irish Railways, and the Guinness brewery, Ireland's largest employer. They also controlled financial companies such as the Bank of Ireland and Goodbody Stockbrokers.

=== Prominent members ===
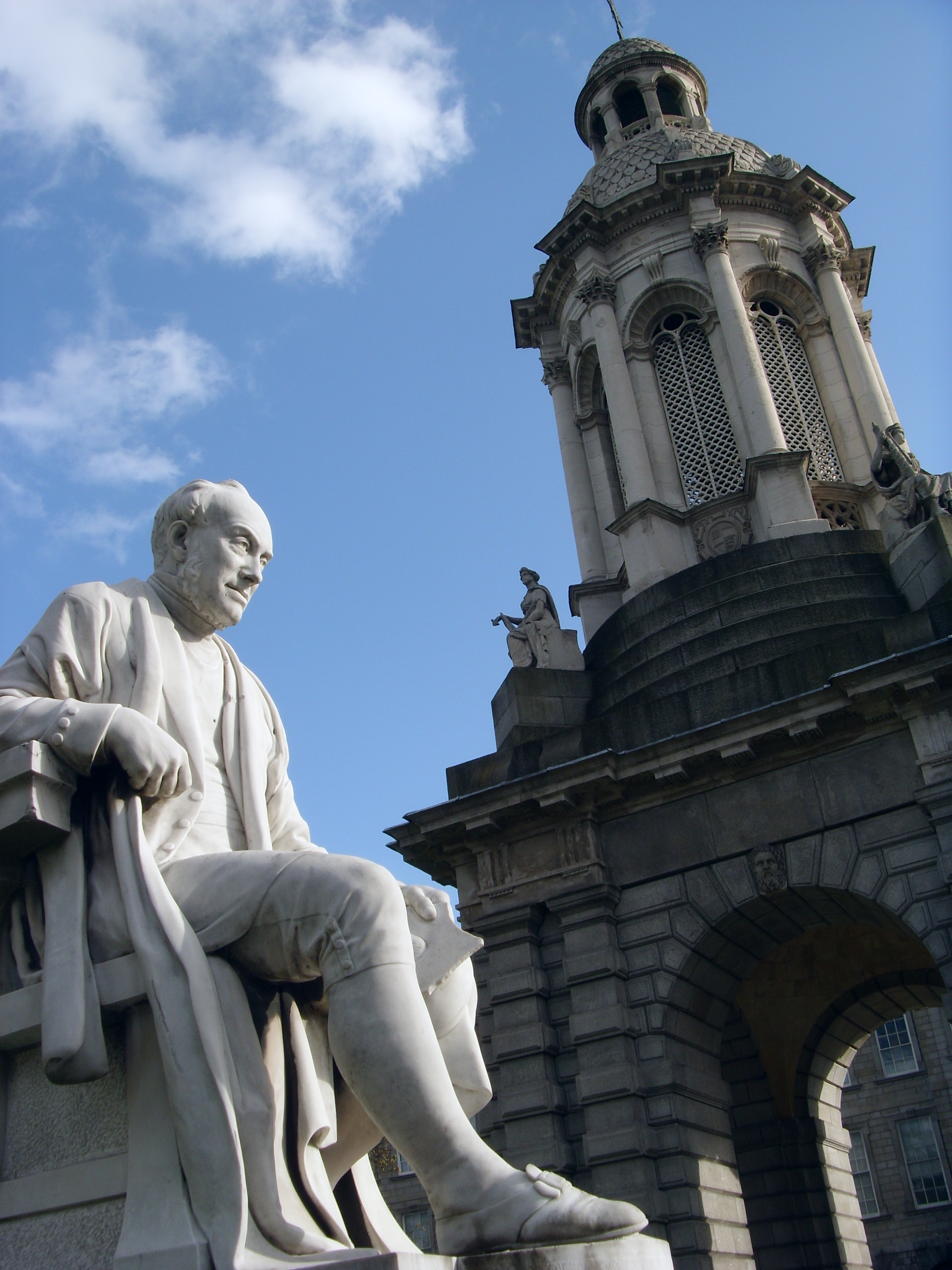
Statue of Anglo-Irish mathematician and theologian George Salmon (1819–1904), in front of the campanile of Trinity College Dublin, the traditional alma mater of the Anglo-Irish class. Salmon was provost of Trinity from 1888 until his death.

Prominent Anglo-Irish poets, writers, and playwrights include Oscar Wilde, Maria Edgeworth, Jonathan Swift, George Berkeley, Sheridan Le Fanu, Oliver Goldsmith, Laurence Sterne, George Darley, Lucy Knox, Bram Stoker, J. M. Synge, W. B. Yeats, Cecil Day-Lewis, Bernard Shaw, Augusta, Lady Gregory, Samuel Beckett, Giles Cooper, C. S. Lewis, Lord Longford, Elizabeth Bowen, William Trevor and William Allingham. The writer Lafcadio Hearn was of Anglo-Irish descent on his father's side but was brought up as a Catholic by his great-aunt.

In the 19th century, some of the most prominent mathematical and physical scientists of the British Isles, including Sir William Rowan Hamilton, Sir George Stokes, John Tyndall, George Johnstone Stoney, Thomas Romney Robinson, Edward Sabine, Thomas Andrews, Lord Rosse, George Salmon, and George FitzGerald, were Anglo-Irish. In the 20th century, scientists John Joly and Ernest Walton were also Anglo-Irish, as was the polar explorer Sir Ernest Shackleton. Medical experts included Sir William Wilde, Robert Graves, Thomas Wrigley Grimshaw, William Stokes, Robert Collis, Sir John Lumsden and William Babington. The geographer William Cooley was one of the first to describe the process of globalization.

The Anglo-Irishmen Richard Brinsley Sheridan, Henry Grattan, Lord Castlereagh, George Canning, Lord Macartney, Thomas Spring Rice, Charles Stewart Parnell, and Edward Carson played major roles in British politics. Downing Street itself was named after Sir George Downing. In the Church, Bishop Richard Pococke contributed much to C18 travel writing.

The Anglo-Irish were also represented among the senior officers of the British Army by men such as Field Marshal Earl Roberts, first honorary Colonel of the Irish Guards regiment, who spent most of his career in British India; Field Marshal Viscount Gough, who served under Wellington, himself a Wellesley born in Dublin to the Earl of Mornington, head of a prominent Anglo-Irish family in Dublin; and in the 20th century Field Marshal Lord Alanbrooke, Field Marshal Lord Alexander of Tunis, General Sir John Winthrop Hackett, Field Marshal Sir Henry Wilson and Field Marshal Sir Garnet Wolseley. (see also Irish military diaspora).

Others were prominent officials and administrators in the British Empire, such as: Frederick Matthew Darley, the Chief Justice of New South Wales; Henry Arthur Blake, Antony MacDonnell and Gavan Duffy. Others were involved in finding better ways of managing it, heading the Donoughmore Commission or the Moyne Commission.

Sir John Winthrop Hackett emigrated to Australia where he became the proprietor and editor of many prominent newspapers. He was also influential in the founding of the University of Western Australia and was its first chancellor.

Prolific art music composers included Michael William Balfe, John Field, George Alexander Osborne, Thomas Roseingrave, Charles Villiers Stanford, John Andrew Stevenson, Robert Prescott Stewart, William Vincent Wallace, and Charles Wood.

In the visual arts, sculptor John Henry Foley, art dealer Hugh Lane, artists Daniel Maclise, William Orpen and Jack Yeats; ballerina Dame Ninette de Valois and designer-architect Eileen Gray were famous outside Ireland.

William Desmond Taylor was an early and prolific maker of silent films in Hollywood. Scriptwriter Johanna Harwood penned several of the early James Bond films, among others.

Philanthropists included Thomas Barnardo and Lord Iveagh.

Confederate general Patrick Cleburne was of Anglo-Irish ancestry.

Discussing what he considered the lack of Irish civic morality in 2011, former Taoiseach Garret FitzGerald remarked that before 1922: "In Ireland a strong civic sense did exist – but mainly amongst Protestants and especially Anglicans".

Henry Ford, the American industrialist and business magnate, was half Anglo-Irish; his father William Ford was born in Cork to a family originally from Somerset, England.

== Attitude towards Ireland's independence ==
The Anglo-Irish, as a class, were mostly opposed to the notions of Irish independence and Home Rule. Most were supporters of continued political union with Great Britain, which existed between 1800 and 1922. This was for many reasons, but most important were the economic benefits of union for the landowning class, the close personal and familial relations with the British establishment, and the political prominence held by the Anglo-Irish in Ireland under the union settlement. Many Anglo-Irish men served as officers in the British Army, were clergymen in the established Anglican Church of Ireland or had land (or business interests) across the British Isles – all factors which encouraged political support for unionism. Between the mid-nineteenth century and 1922, the Anglo-Irish comprised the bulk of the support for movements such as the Irish Unionist Alliance, especially in the southern three provinces of Ireland.

During the First World War, Irish nationalist MP Tom Kettle compared the Anglo-Irish landlord class to the Prussian Junkers, saying, "England goes to fight for liberty in Europe and for junkerdom in Ireland."

However, Protestants in Ireland, and the Anglo-Irish class in particular, were by no means universally attached to the cause of continued political union with Great Britain. For instance, author Jonathan Swift (1667–1745), a clergyman in the Church of Ireland, vigorously denounced the plight of ordinary Irish Catholics under the rule of the landlords. Reformist politicians such as Henry Grattan (1746–1820), Wolfe Tone (1763–1798), Robert Emmet (1778–1803), Sir John Gray (1815–1875), and Charles Stewart Parnell (1846–1891), were also Protestant nationalists, and in large measure led and defined Irish nationalism. The Irish Rebellion of 1798 was led by members of the Anglo-Irish and Ulster Scots class, some of whom feared the political implications of the impending union with Great Britain. By the late 19th and early 20th centuries, however, Irish nationalism became increasingly tied to a Roman Catholic identity. By the beginning of the twentieth century, many Anglo-Irishmen in southern Ireland had become convinced of the need for a political settlement with Irish nationalists. Anglo-Irish politicians such as Sir Horace Plunkett and Lord Monteagle became leading figures in finding a peaceful solution to the 'Irish question'.

During the Irish War of Independence (1919–1921), many Anglo-Irish landlords left the country due to arson attacks on their family homes. The burnings continued and many sectarian murders were carried out by the Anti-Treaty IRA during the Irish Civil War. Considering the new Irish Free State unable to protect them, many members of the Anglo-Irish class subsequently left what would later become the Republic of Ireland forever, fearing that they would be subject to discriminatory legislation and social pressures. The Protestant proportion of the population within what would become the Republic of Ireland dropped from 10% (300,000) to 6% (180,000) in the twenty-five years following independence, with most resettling in Great Britain. In the whole of Ireland, the percentage of Protestants was 26% (1.1 million).

The reaction of the Anglo-Irish to the Anglo-Irish Treaty which envisaged the establishment of the Irish Free State was mixed. The Most Rev. John A.F. Gregg, Church of Ireland Archbishop of Dublin, stated in a sermon in December 1921 (the month the Treaty was signed):

It concerns us all to offer the Irish Free State our loyalty. I believe there is a genuine desire on the part of those who have long differed from us politically to welcome our co-operation. We should be wrong politically and religiously to reject such advances.

In 1925, when the Irish Free State was poised to outlaw divorce, the Anglo-Irish poet W. B. Yeats delivered a famous eulogy for his class in the Irish Senate:

I think it is tragic that within three years of this country gaining its independence we should be discussing a measure which a minority of this nation considers to be grossly oppressive. I am proud to consider myself a typical man of that minority. We against whom you have done this thing, are no petty people. We are one of the great stocks of Europe. We are the people of Burke; we are the people of Grattan; we are the people of Swift, the people of Emmet, the people of Parnell. We have created the most of the modern literature of this country. We have created the best of its political intelligence. Yet I do not altogether regret what has happened. I shall be able to find out, if not I, my children will be able to find out whether we have lost our stamina or not. You have defined our position and have given us a popular following. If we have not lost our stamina then your victory will be brief, and your defeat final, and when it comes this nation may be transformed.

== Peerage ==
Following the English victory in the Nine Years' War (1594–1603), the "Flight of the Earls" in 1607, the traditional Gaelic Irish nobility was displaced in Ireland, particularly in the Cromwellian period. By 1707, after further defeat in the Williamite War and the subsequent Union of England and Scotland, the aristocracy in Ireland was dominated by Anglican families who owed allegiance to the Crown. Some of these were Irish families who had chosen to conform to the established Church of Ireland, keeping their lands and privileges, such as the Dukes of Leinster (whose surname is FitzGerald, and who descend from the Hiberno-Norman aristocracy), or the Gaelic Guinness family. Some were families of British or mixed-British ancestry who owed their status in Ireland to the Crown, such as the Earls of Cork (whose surname is Boyle and whose ancestral roots were in Herefordshire, England).

Among the prominent Anglo-Irish peers are:

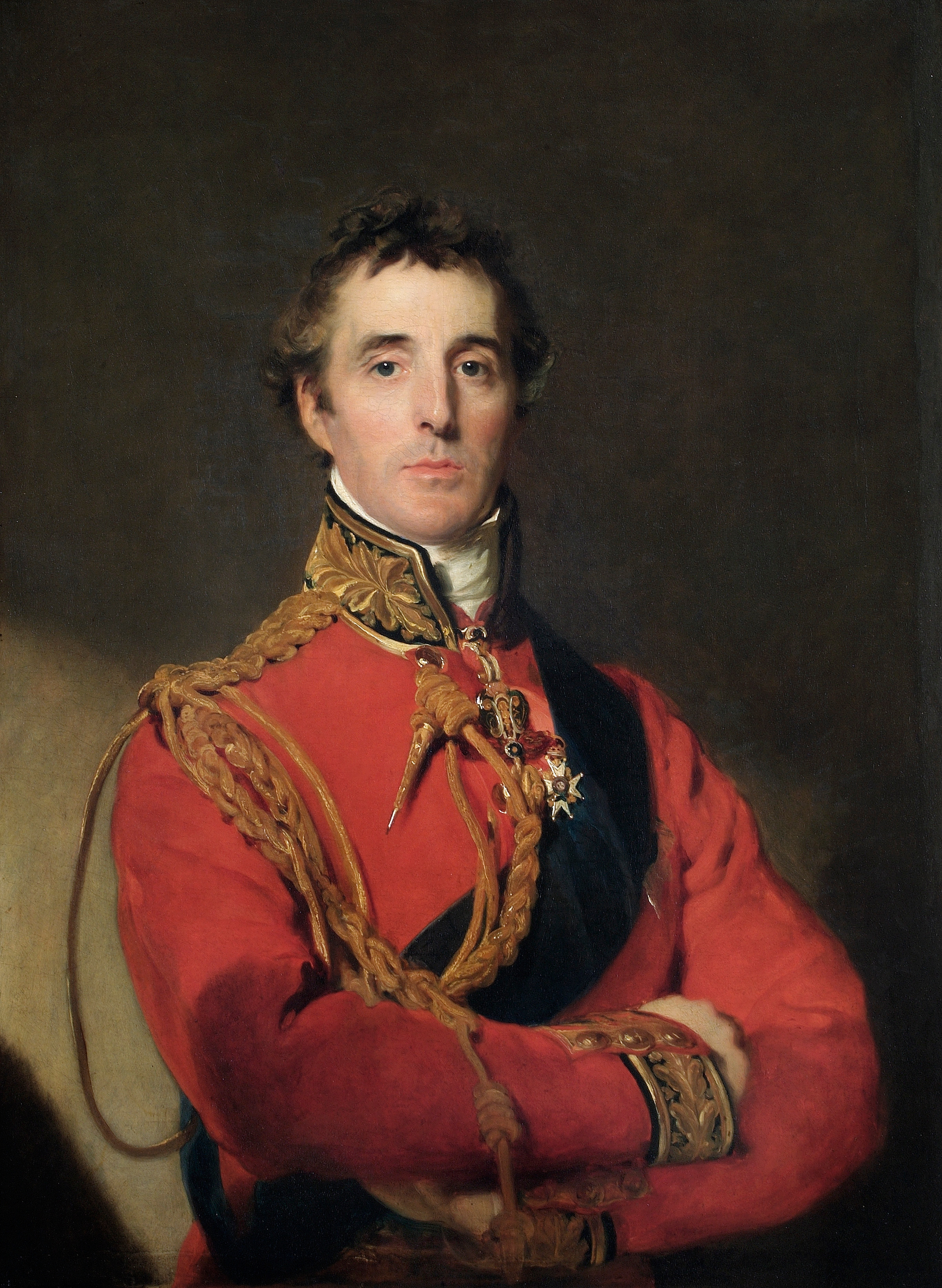
The Duke of Wellington

- The 1st Earl of Cork, Lord High Treasurer of Ireland, father of scientist Robert Boyle.
- The 1st Baron Glenavy, second-last Lord Chancellor of Ireland and first Cathoirleach (or Chairman) of the Irish Senate (1922).
- The 8th Marquess Conyngham, owner of the Slane Castle rock venue and candidate for Fine Gael in recent Irish general elections.
- The 3rd Earl of Iveagh, of Gaelic Irish descent; head of the Guinness family who sat in the Irish Senate (1973–1977).
- The 6th Earl of Longford, Impresario at the Gate Theatre in Dublin in the 1950s.
- The 2nd Earl of Shelburne, British prime minister in 1782–83.
- The 7th Earl of Longford (Frank Longford; who succeeded his brother (above) in the Earldom), British Labour Cabinet minister, biographer and friend of Éamon de Valera.
- The 3rd Earl of Rosse, astronomer and builder of the then-largest telescope in the world.
- The 18th Baron of Dunsany, author.
- The 1st Baron Fermoy, Irish peer.
- The 1st Duke of Ormonde, 17th-century statesman, served as Lord Deputy of Ireland on two occasions and commanded Royalist forces in Ireland in the Irish Confederate Wars negotiating with the Irish Confederates on behalf of Charles I.
- Murrough, 1st Earl of Inchiquin, 6th Baron Inchiquin (1618–1674), of Gaelic Irish descent; a Parliamentary commander in the Irish Confederate Wars (1644–1648) before changing sides to become one of the leaders of the Royalist troops in Ireland during the Wars of the Three Kingdoms and the Cromwellian conquest of Ireland (1649–53).
- Field Marshal The 1st Duke of Wellington, Anglo-Irish general who fought many successful campaigns and defeated Napoleon at the Battle of Waterloo. He later became Prime Minister of the United Kingdom of Great Britain and Ireland.

Until the year 1800, the peers of Ireland were all entitled to a seat in the Irish House of Lords, the upper house of the Parliament of Ireland, in Dublin. After 1800, under the provisions of the Act of Union, the Parliament of Ireland was abolished and the Irish peers were entitled to elect twenty-eight of their number to sit in the British House of Lords, in London, as Irish representative peers. During the Georgian Era, titles in the Peerage of Ireland were often granted by the British monarch to Englishmen with little or no connection to Ireland, as a way of preventing such honours from inflating the membership of the British House of Lords.

A number of Anglo-Irish peers have been appointed by Presidents of Ireland to serve on their advisory Council of State. Some were also considered possible candidates for presidents of Ireland, including:

- Lord Killanin (though an Irish Catholic, rather than Anglo-Irish despite his peerage)
- Lord Ashbourne (a renowned Gaelic scholar).

== See also ==
- Normans in Ireland
- Surrender and regrant
- Hiberno-English
- Ulster Scots people
- Plantation of Ulster
- Unionism in Ireland
- Catholic Unionist
- Protestant Irish nationalists
- Souperism
- English diaspora
- Reform Movement
- Confederate Ireland
- Jacobitism
- Irish Unionist Alliance
- West Brit
- Ireland–United Kingdom relations
- Irish migration to Great Britain
- Baron Baltimore
- Derry
- Miler Magrath
- Samuel Beckett
- Valerie, Lady Goulding
