= Fitzwilton House =

Former brutalist office block in Dublin, Ireland

- Interactive map of the Fitzwilton House area

General information
- Status: Demolished
- Type: Office
- Architectural style: Brutalist
- Location: Wilton Terrace and Cumberland Road, Dublin, Ireland
- Coordinates: 53.333318°N 6.250522°W
- Elevation: 50 m (160 ft)
- Construction started: 1967
- Estimated completion: 1969
- Renovated: 2003
- Demolished: 2018

Height
- Height: 30 m (98 ft)

Technical details
- Material: concrete and steel
- Floor count: 12
- Floor area: 75,000 square feet

Design and construction
- Architects: Ronald Lyon Estate Architects and Emanuel Schoolheifer & Don Burley
- Developer: Basil Goulding
- Main contractor: G&T Crampton

Renovating team
- Architect: Scott Tallon Walker

Fitzwilton House was a brutalist concrete and steel office block in Dublin, Ireland completed in 1969 and demolished in October 2018.

The block was developed by Basil Goulding and for many years housed the Embassy of Australia, Dublin as well as a number of businesses run or owned by Goulding.

The building included a number of commissioned works by notable Irish and British artists including Robert Ballagh, Barrie Cooke, Anne Madden and Michael Farrell, some of which have since been transferred to the Trinity College Dublin Art Collection.

== History ==
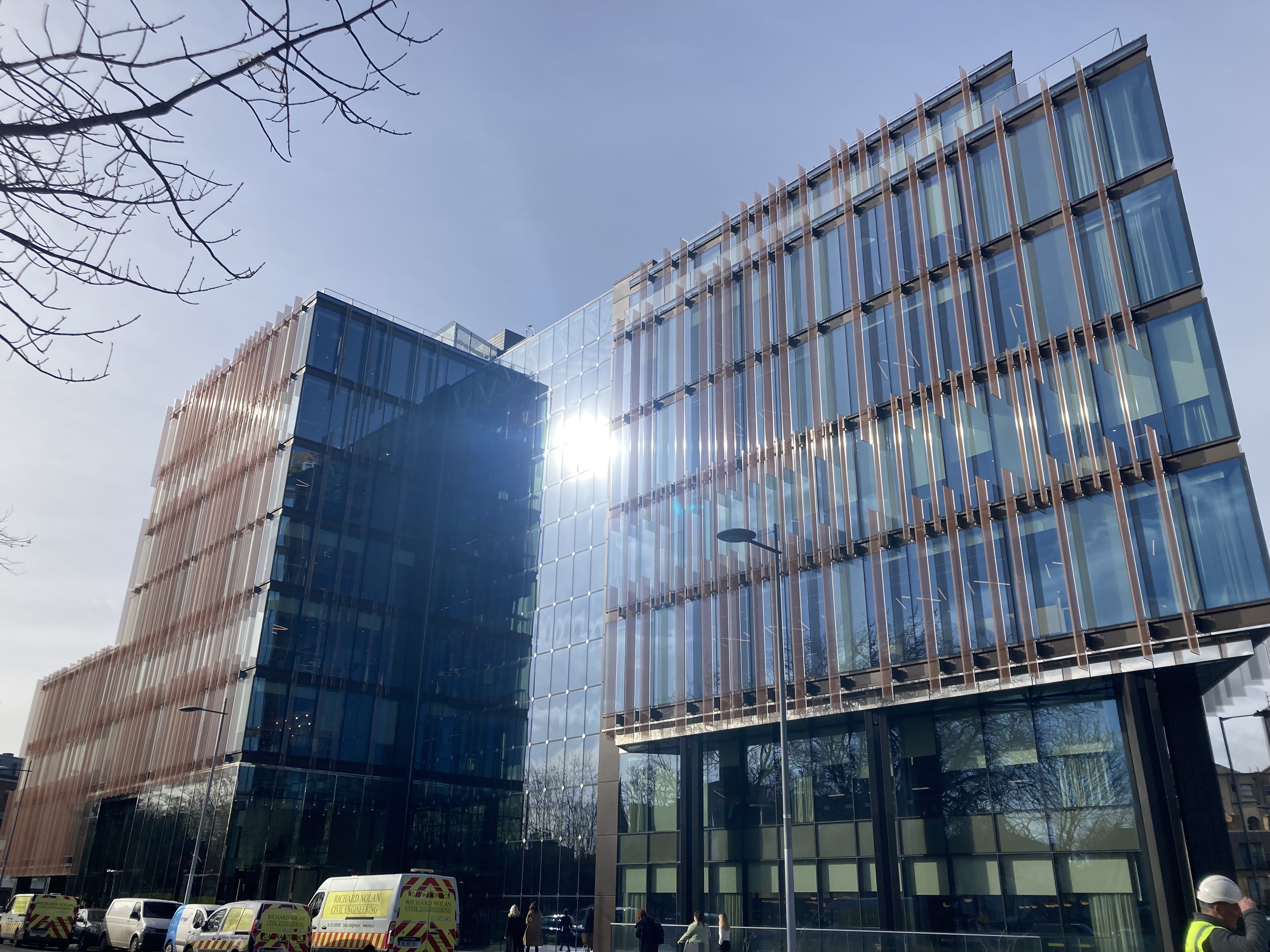
One Wilton Place in 2023.

Planning permission for the building was received in 1964, just 3 weeks before the new planning laws were brought into force. The structure replaced 6 classical style houses which faced on to the Grand Canal and Wilton Terrace and sat adjacent to the grounds of Fitzwilliam Lawn Tennis Club while overlooking the triangular Wilton Square park. Later in 1972, the tennis club moved to a new dedicated site designed by Sam Stephenson at nearby Appian Way as part of a land swap arranged by Ken O'Reilly Hyland, Sam Stephenson, Arthur Gibney and New Ireland Assurance with the brutalist Wilton Place designed by Brian Hogan ultimately taking its place when completed in 1984.

The name was a portmanteau of "Fitzwilliam" and "Wilton", references to the Fitzwilliam estate for which Fitzwilliam Square and tennis club were named as well as the adjacent streets named Wilton such as Wilton Terrace, Place and Square.

The office was constructed for Fitzwilton Securities, a company mainly owned by Tony O'Reilly via its takeover of W. & H. M. Goulding.

In 1982, the building was acquired by IPUT.

=== One Wilton Park ===
A new office developed by IPUT real estate and designed by Henry J Lyons named One Wilton Park replaced Fitzwilton House in 2022. As of 2023 the building housed some of the Irish offices of LinkedIn.

In October 2025, it was announced that One Wilton Park was going to form the Global Headquarters of Stripe with LinkedIn moving to offices at nearby Wilton Place.
