= Tim Goulding =

Irish painter (born 1945)

- Born: 15 May 1945 (age 81); Dublin, Ireland
- Education: Konstfack
- Known for: Painting
- Style: Realism
- Spouse(s): Patricia Moran; Georgina
- Children: 1
- Parent(s): Basil Goulding; Valerie Hamilton Monckton
- Elected: Aosdána
- Website: timgoulding.com

Timothy Adam Goulding (born 15 May 1945) is an Irish painter and musician.

== Early life ==
Goulding was born in Dublin in 1945 to an Anglo-Irish family. His father was Sir William Basil Goulding, 3rd Baronet, an art collector, cricketer, squash player and industrialist, and his mother was Senator Valerie Goulding (née Hamilton Monckton), a campaigner for disabled people who set up the Central Remedial Clinic in 1951.

He grew up in County Wicklow but was educated in England from the age of 7, attending Winchester College. He was awarded a scholarship to study textile design at the Konstfack in Stockholm.

== Career ==
Goulding is largely self-taught as a painter. He exhibited for the first time in 1964 and represented Ireland at the 1971 Biennale de Paris.

His work is in the collections of Office of Public Works, Teagasc, the National Library of Ireland, Arts Council of Ireland, Arts Council of Northern Ireland, Irish Museum of Modern Art, Ashmolean Museum, Crawford Gallery and Ulster Museum. He was elected to Aosdána in 1992.

According to Hilary Pyle of The Irish Times, "Goulding has developed a compelling style which can rise with a swell into realism, and subside again into abstraction without losing its consistency: and can be seen as the natural succession in Irish art to the work of George Russell in that it represents an inner landscape at the same time as being true to what is visible to the eye."

== Music ==
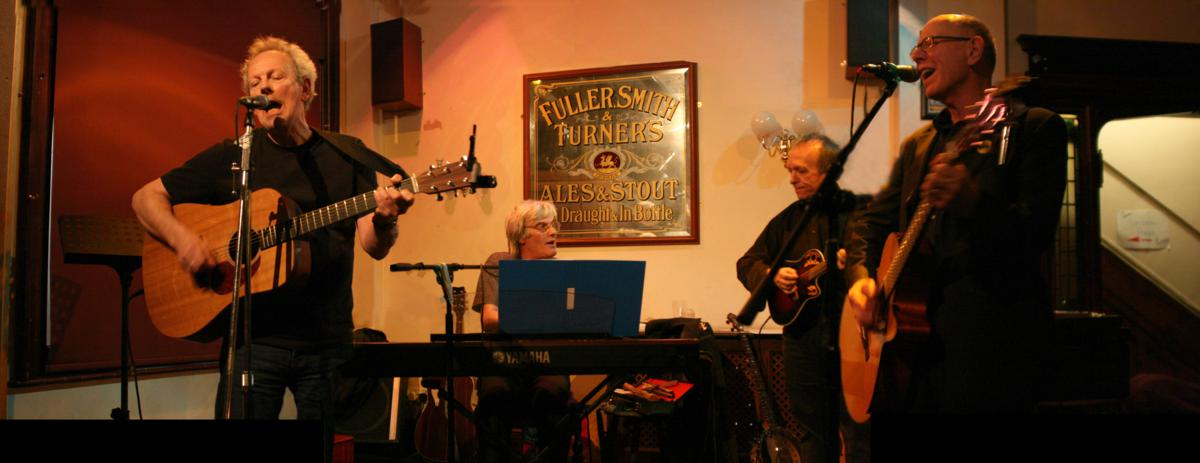
Dr. Strangely Strange in 2009; Goulding is on keyboard.

Goulding was part of the experimental folk group Dr. Strangely Strange from 1967 onward.

== Personal life ==
Goulding has lived and worked near Allihies since 1969. He is married to Georgina; they have one child. He received a liver transplant in 2017.
