= Newtownbreda =

Coordinates: 54.560°N 5.913°W

Newtownbreda: Irish: Baile Nua na Bréadaí
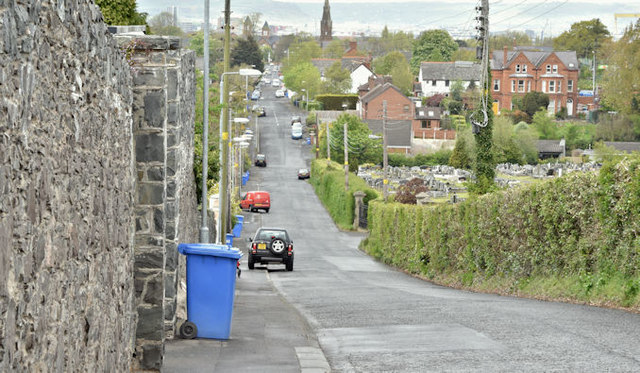
- Church Road by Knockbreda Cemetery

- Location within Northern Ireland
- Population: 5,000 (estimate)
- District: Lisburn and Castlereagh
- Country: Northern Ireland
- Sovereign state: United Kingdom
- Post town: BELFAST
- Postcode district: BT8
- Dialling code: 028
- Police: Northern Ireland
- Fire: Northern Ireland
- Ambulance: Northern Ireland
- UK Parliament: Belfast South (until 2024) Belfast South and Mid Down (from 2024 General Election)

Newtownbreda, most commonly known as Breda (Irish: Baile Nua na Bréadaí) is a residential suburban area of south Belfast, within County Down in Northern Ireland, clustered around a small and now largely invisible 18th century village. The A55 Belfast Outer Ring road and A24 road pass through the area. The population would be estimated to be somewhere around 5,000.

At one time, Newtownbreda was a small village in south Belfast. However, it is now part of the Greater Belfast conurbation and the name is a descriptor used loosely to describe the very broad area including Belvoir, Four Winds and Knockbreda. It is a largely residential area of private housing.

== Notable locations ==
Newtownbreda has several churches including the 18th century Church of Ireland Parish Church, which uses the name of the civil parish Knockbreda and which owes its existence to Arthur Hill from nearby Belvoir Demesne. The church consecrated by Francis Hutchinson, Bishop of Down and Connor, on Sunday 7 August 1737.

The Forestside Shopping Centre was developed by Sainsbury's between 1996 and 1998. Belvoir Park Golf Club and Belvoir Forest Park are also located nearby. A 48,000 square feet (4,500 m^{2}) Tesco store was built on a brownfield site, (formerly a warehouse for the Stewarts Supermarket chain) and opened in 2007.

=== The Troubles ===
On 23 September 1992 a Provisional IRA bomb destroyed the Northern Ireland Forensic Science Laboratory (NIFSL) on the Newtownbreda Road. The IRA had given a warning, and British Army bomb disposal experts were investigating an abandoned van when the explosion occurred. No people were killed or seriously injured, but 42 houses were totally destroyed. Over one thousand homes in a radius of 1.5 miles (2.4 km) were damaged.

== Sport ==
Newtownbreda F.C. are an intermediate football club that play in the Northern Amateur Football League. They play at Cairnshill Playing Fields, and won the NAFL Division 2A in 2001.
