= Contemporary Irish Art Society =

The Contemporary Irish Art Society (CIAS) is an Irish society founded in 1962 to support the visual arts in Ireland. It purchases art works directly to donate to public galleries, as well as advising other bodies on works by living Irish artists. It also collects photographs.

== History ==
The society's founders include Sir Basil Goulding, who served as the first chair, Cecil King, Gordon Lambert, Michael Scott and others. The first work purchased was Large Solar Device by Patrick Scott in 1963. During the 1960s and early 1970s it supported the Hugh Lane Gallery in Dublin, which received around forty works of art, including works by Gerard Dillon, Gerda Frömel, James Scanlon, William Scott and Camille Souter. Rosemarie Mulcahy calls Scanlon's Study no. 2 for Miró, a stained glass donated by the society, "one of the delights" of the Hugh Lane collection.

Since 1974, the society has donated works to the Butler Gallery, Irish Museum of Modern Art (IMMA), Kilkenny Castle, University of Galway and University College Dublin, among other institutions. In 1978, the society began to collect art works on paper, and its collection of these works was first exhibited in London and Ireland in 1980.

In 2005, the society held a joint exhibition with IMMA, SIAR 50, which showcased around a hundred works from the preceding 50 years collected by the society and its members. IMMA states that the collection documents "almost all the major developments in Irish art over the past 50 years" and notes "The keen eye which its members brought to their choice of works is clearly evident in the number of artists, relatively unknown at the time of purchase, who have since gone on to become leading figures in the Irish, and indeed international, visual art arenas." In a review of the exhibition, art critic Brian Fallon called the society's collecting "astute" and stated that the exhibition was "a highly representative selection of Irish art over nearly half a century." He also praised the collection of sculpture.
