= Balconi =

Balconi may refer to:

- Balconi (surname), an Italian surname
- Dolciaria Balconi, Italian company specialized in sponge cake

== See also ==
- Balcony (disambiguation)
