= Stewarts Supermarket Limited =

Former chain of supermarkets in Northern Ireland

- Company type: Former supermarket chain
- Defunct: 1997
- Fate: Purchased by Tesco
- Successor: Tesco
- Parent: Associated British Foods

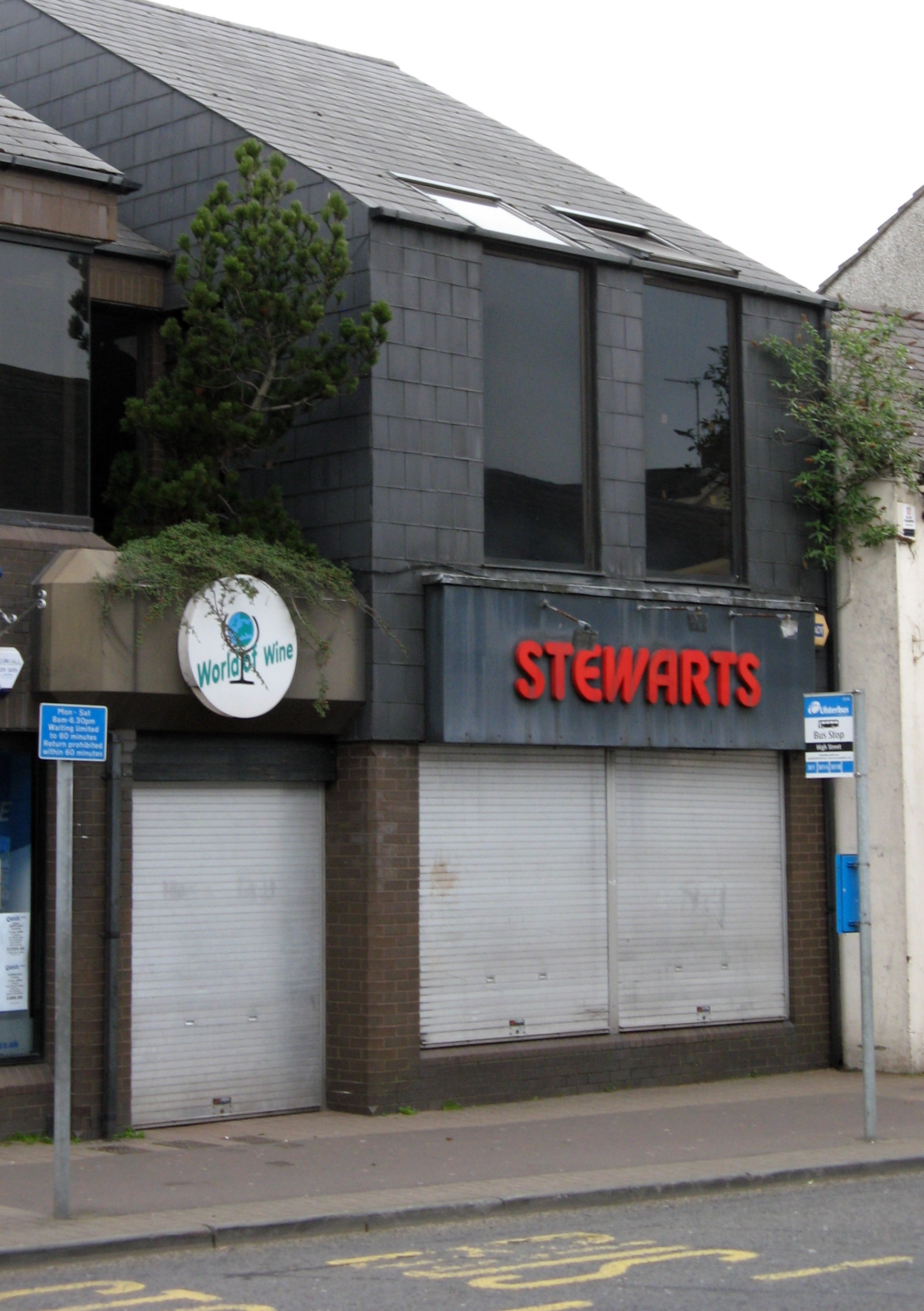
A Stewarts off licence in Holywood, County Down

Stewarts Supermarket Limited (traded as Stewarts and Crazy Prices) was a supermarket chain in Northern Ireland. The chain was purchased by Tesco in March 1997.

== History ==
=== Stewarts/Crazy Prices ===
The company slogans were 'No one delivers value like Stewarts' and 'No one delivers freshness like Stewarts'. A television advertising campaign in the end of the 1980s included a cover version of the song Locomotion, with these slogans replacing 'Come on baby, do the Locomotion'. (The song was then popular because of Kylie Minogue's successful cover of 1988).

Crazy Prices' long time advertising theme was alternate lyrics set to the tune Tiger Feet by Mud.

=== Tesco ===
On 21 March 1997, Tesco agreed the purchase of the food retailing and related businesses of Associated British Foods (ABF) on the island of Ireland for £643 million. The acquisition was completed in May, after regulatory approval was granted.

The Northern Irish businesses were 19 Stewarts, nine Crazy Prices and six other (Westside Stores and Bloomfields along with Toy Crazy and Pet Crazy in the Derriaghy complex), 78 Stewarts Wine Barrel off licence stores, the sports goods retailer Lifestyle Sports, the meat processing and packing business Kingsway Fresh Foods and the fresh fruit and vegetable distributor Daily Wrap Produce.

This was a major expansion of Tesco's presence in Northern Ireland, its only other presence in Northern Ireland being a Tesco Metro in the city centre of Belfast. Other Great Britain-based retailers had entered the market in Ireland around the same time. Sainsbury's had opened two stores at Ballymena and Forestside by the time Tesco completed the Stewarts purchase, and opened seven more between then and 2003.

Safeway formed Safeway Stores Ireland along with Fitzwilton, taking over a number of former stores of Wellworths. The Republic of Ireland stores (Powers Supermarkets, trading as Quinnsworth and Crazy Prices) became Tesco Ireland, while the Northern Irish stores became part of the Tesco core business in the United Kingdom.
