= Valeo Foods =

Pan-European producer of branded food and beverage products

- Type: Private
- Industry: Food production, Food service
- Founded: 2010
- Headquarters: Dublin, Ireland
- Area served: 90 countries globally
- Key people: Ronald Kers (CEO); Louis-Francois Gombert (CFO)
- Products: Biscuits, Healthy snacking, Savoury snacking, Home baking, Fruit preserves, Canned vegetables, Canned fish, Culinary ingredients, Condiments, Stocks, Meal ingredients, Mediterranean foods, Juice, Confectionery, Professional food ingredients, Out of home food and beverage solutions
- Owner: Bain Capital
- Number of employees: 4500
- Website: www.valeofoods.com

Valeo Foods is an Irish multinational producer of branded food and beverage products. The company has a portfolio of over 50 international food brands which are sold across 90 countries globally, including Rowse Honey, Odlums, Batchelors canned food, Jacob's, Dolciaria Balconi, and Kelkin. The business combines food production, brand development, distribution and sales.

In 2021 it was bought by American private investment firm Bain Capital for €1.7 billion.

== History ==
Valeo Foods was established in September 2010 through the merger of Batchelors, a manufacturer and retail category partner of a number of Irish food and drink brands, and Origin Foods, the food division of Irish-based Origin Enterprises Plc which included the Odlums, Shamrock and Roma brands.

In August 2011, the company acquired Jacob Fruitfield, a producer of biscuits, sauces and preserves, creating Ireland’s largest ambient food (shelf-stable food) supplier to the grocery trade and a supplier to the UK market. In March 2014, Valeo Foods added Rowse Honey, the largest producer of honey and the category leader in the UK, to its brands.

In June 2015, Valeo Foods announced its acquisition of Dolciaria Balconi, an Italian food producer that specializes in sponge cake, wafers and biscuits.

On 28 July 2015, Origin Enterprises plc announced the disposal of its 32% equity interest in the consumer foods group Valeo Foods Group Limited to CapVest Partners LLP.

In August 2018, Valeo Foods announced completion of its acquisition of Tangerine Confectionery.

In 2019, Valeo Foods sold Nimbus Foods Limited to the dairy company Meadow Foods Limited. In 2019, Valeo Foods bought Kettle Food's European division, which makes crisps.

In 2020 the company acquired It's All Good, which manufactures tortilla chips. As of 2021 Valeo was controlling 27 factories, manufacturing in Germany, the Netherlands, the Czech Republic, the United Kingdom and the Republic of Ireland.

In 2021, CapVest sold Valeo Foods to Bain Capital for over €1.7 billion.

== Operations ==
Headquartered in Dublin, Ireland, the company operates from seven in-house manufacturing facilities located in Ireland, Italy and Great Britain, and additional offices in Dublin, Belfast, Oxfordshire and Milan.

== Products ==
Product brands, owned or distributed by Valeo Foods, include Odlums (flour and cereal), Chef (condiments), Roma (pasta and rice), Robert Roberts (coffee and tea), Kelkin (cereal products) and Shamrock (baking products). The Shamrock brand, for example, was established in Ireland in the 1950s and is used to market home baking products, including dried fruit, nuts and seeds. Shamrock also provides "route-to-market services" for third-party food manufacturers.
