= Mary Fitzgerald =

Mary Fitzgerald may refer to:

- Mary Fitzgerald (trade unionist) (1883–1960), Irish-born South African political activist
- Mary Fitzgerald (artist) (born 1956), Irish artist
- Mary Anne Fitzgerald (born 1945), South African-born British journalist, development aid worker and author
- Mary Fitzgerald (politician), member of the South Dakota House of Representatives
- Mary Fitzgerald (athlete), (born 1999) Irish Paralympic athlete

== See also ==
- Mary Fitzgerald Square in Johannesburg, South Africa
