= Odlums Group =

Irish food processing and marketing company

Odlums
- The old logo, which was used for many years with many variations
- Company type: Subsidiary
- Industry: Food processing and marketing
- Founded: 1845 in Portlaoise, Ireland
- Parent: Valeo Foods
- Website: odlums.ie

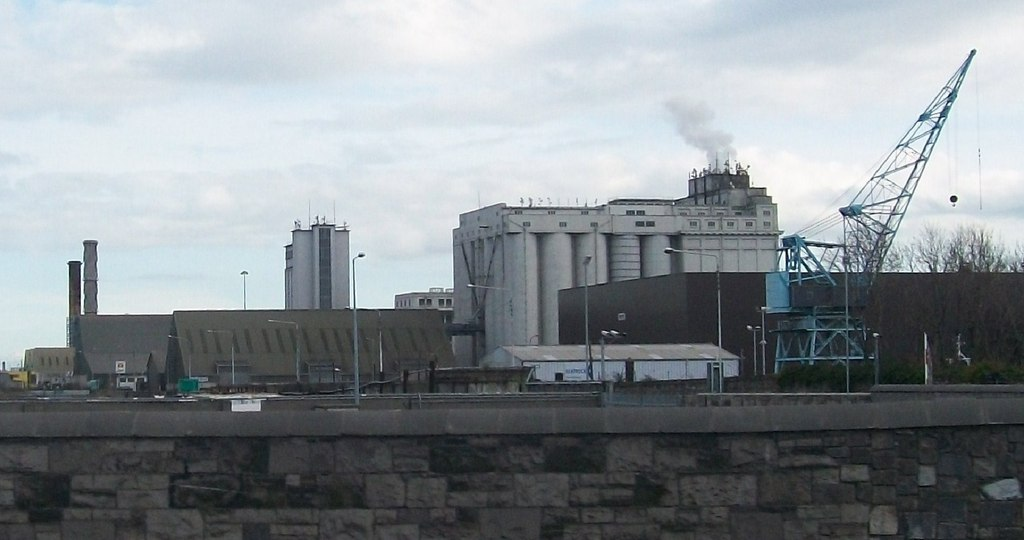
Dublin Port Odlums Flour Mill

Odlums Group is an Irish food processing and marketing company that manufactures and retails products under the Odlums name. It is a wholly owned subsidiary of Valeo Foods, which is owned by Bain Capital.

== History ==
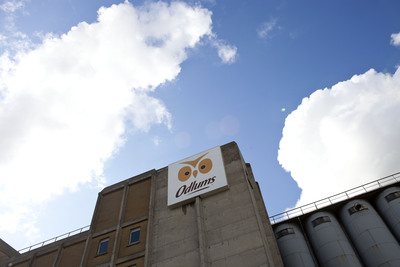
Odlums Mill

A flour mill operated by William Odlum, one of three Odlum brothers, in Maryborough (now Portlaoise) began operation in 1845. Odlum was succeeded by his two sons, William P. and Richard Odlum, and the company became known as W.P. & R. Odlum. In the early 20th century, the company operated as many as nine mills but consolidation reduced that number to the current three flour mills in Dublin, Cork, and Portarlington. The oatmeal mill in Sallins was closed at the end of 2013.

The company remained in family hands until 1988. In 2007, Origin Enterprises, which previously had a 50% stake in the Odlums Group, acquired full control of Odlums from the state-sponsored Greencore Group. In 2010, Batchelors, a manufacturer and retail category partner, and Origin Foods, the food division of Irish-based Origin Enterprises Plc, merged to create Valeo Foods. Origin Enterprises retained a 45% interest in the new company, and private equity company CapVest Limited, which owned Batchelors, controlled the remaining 55%. In 2015, CapVest bought Origin Enterprises out of Valeo for €86.6 million.

CapVest sold Valeo Foods to Bain Capital in 2021.

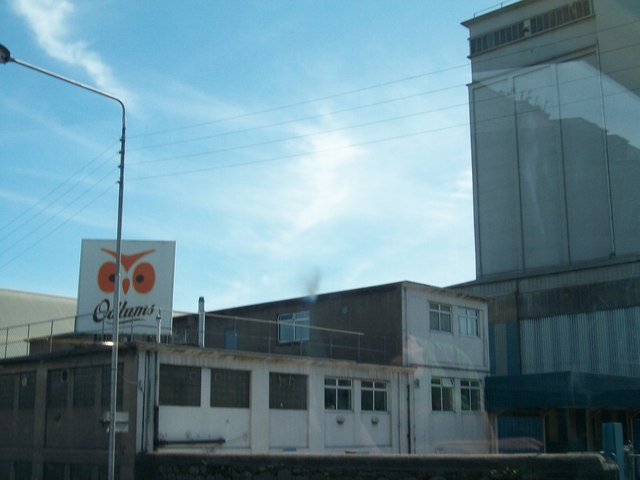
Grain Store on Alexandra Road

== Products ==
Odlums manufactures and retails a number of flour and cereal related products under the Odlums name. These include quick porridges, cereal snacks, health foods, and baking flours and mixes. Odlums also customizes flours for wholesale to bakers.

In addition to Odlums branded products, the group manufactured and sold McCann's Steel Cut Irish Oatmeal and other similar oat products when it owned the McCann's brand from 1964 until 2008, when it was sold to Sturm Foods.

== See also ==
- Aryzta
- R&H Hall
