= Rowse Honey =

British honey company

Rowse Honey Ltd
- Company type: Subsidiary
- Industry: Food processing
- Founded: 1954
- Headquarters: Wallingford, Oxfordshire
- Area served: United Kingdom
- Key people: Chris Rowse; Founder
- Products: Honey
- Number of employees: over 100
- Parent: Valeo Foods (2014–present)
- Website: www.rowsehoney.co.uk

Rowse Honey Ltd is a United Kingdom honey supplier. Its products are stocked by major supermarket chains and other stores. They also supply Kellogg's with honey for use in breakfast cereals. Other products include lemon curd and maple syrup.

== History ==
Tony Rowse began beekeeping in a shed in Ewelme, Oxfordshire in 1938 and it was then that he formed the Rowse Honey Company in the village in 1954. In 1971 it became a Limited company. In 1987 the company moved to larger premises in nearby Wallingford and Tony's son Richard took over the running of the business that year. In September 2006 the company was purchased for c£70 million by Wellness Foods. Valeo Foods acquired the company in March 2014.

== Packaging and strength ratings ==
The honey is sold in hexagonal glass jars and beehive style plastic bottles with green lids. The jars display a strength rating on the following scale: Mild, Fairly Mild, Medium, Fairly Strong, Strong. Most recently a new snap and squeeze variety sachet has been released in the UK.

== Varieties ==
The main varieties of everyday honey are:

- Pure & Natural Clear Honey
- Pure & Natural Set Honey
- Organic Set Honey
- Organic Clear Honey
- Fairtrade Clear Honey
- Light & Mild Honey

Monofloral honey varieties include: English Wildflower, Scottish Heather, Clover, Orange Blossom, Acacia and Manuka. Honey imported from Australia, New Zealand, Tasmania and Greece is sold.

Rowse also produce novelty honeys including:

- Honey with Cinnamon
- Chilli Fusion Honey
