= Fitzwilton =

Privately held investment company

- Company type: Private
- Key people: Basil Goulding; Tony O'Reilly; Peter Goulandris

Fitzwilton is a privately held investment company, formerly owned by Tony O'Reilly and his brother in law, Peter Goulandris, through Stoneworth Investment Limited. It has been involved with many businesses in Ireland.

== History ==
Fitzwilton has its origin in the management reverse take over of W. & H. M. Goulding Limited whose origins date to 1856 by Fitzwilliam Securities. Fitzwilliam Securities was established by Tony O'Reilly with friends (Ferguson and Leonard) in the 1971. As part of the process W. & H. M. Goulding changed its name to Fitzwilton based on the name of Fitzwilton House which had been developed by Basil Goulding. As a result, the official incorporation date of the company dates back to when W. & H. M. Goulding was reincorporated in 1894.

Over the years, the company has been involved in numerous business activities ranging from textiles, to house construction, to fertiliser manufacturing, to bottling, to oil and gas investments, to supermarkets to light manufacturing. Taken private in the late 1990s in conjunction with his brother-in-law, the company is now involved in light manufacturing, property investments, financial services and architectural signage

=== Northern Ireland deal ===
In June 1997 Fitzwilton signed a joint venture deal with Safeway plc which saw 15 of its Northern Irish Wellworths stores converted to Safeway outlets. The remaining Wellworths stores were sold to the Musgrave Group. Safeway's move into Northern Ireland followed that of J Sainsbury and Tesco; Sainsbury's announced its expansion into the province in 1995 and opened its first store in December 1996, while Tesco opened its first store in October 1996 and purchased Associated British Foods' Stewarts/Crazy Prices group in 1997. Fitzwilton objected to Sainsbury's planning applications on the grounds that authorities had "moved mountains" to allow the company's developments to proceed. Fitzwilton was successful in delaying Sainsbury's Coleraine store, but failed ultimately to prevent the development.

=== Taken private ===
Fitzwilton plc was de-listed from the stock exchange in 1998 when O'Reilly and Goulandris completed their takeover.

In July 2002 Safeway purchased Fitzwilton's 50% share of Safeway Stores (Ireland) for £45 million.

== Till 2019 ==
In 2015 Tony O'Reilly resigned his position as Director of Fitzwilton, a day before he was declared bankrupt in the Bahamas. His son Tony O'Reilly Jr would also step down as a director in early 2017 formally ending over 45 years of family membership of the board. Fitzwilton's main residual business was Rennicks, a supplier of "road traffic management products", mostly metallic roadsigns but also owns Mobile Traffic Solutions, which sells and rents portable changeable message signs (PCMS) for which it holds exclusive marketing rights for Ireland and the UK. In 2017 the Rennicks underwent a Management buyout supported by Renatus Capital Partners, at which Fitzwilton ceased to have any operating companies.
