= Camille Souter =

British-born Irish artist (1929–2023)

Camille Souter HRHA
- Souter beside a sculpture by her son Tim Morris
- Born: Betty Pamela Holmes; 22 October 1929; Northampton, England
- Died: 3 March 2023 (aged 93); Dublin, Ireland
- Known for: Abstract landscapes
- Style: Expressionist
- Spouse: Frank Morris (m. 1960; died 1970)
- Children: 5
- Elected: Aosdána 1981

Camille Souter (born Betty Pamela Holmes; 22 October 1929 – 3 March 2023) was a British-born Irish abstract and landscape artist. She lived and worked on Achill Island and was a Saoi of Aosdána.

== Early life ==
Souter was born Betty Pamela Holmes in Northampton, England, on 22 October 1929, but she was raised in Ireland. Souter received a general education at Glengara Park School in Dun Laoghaire. She originally trained as a nurse at Guy's Hospital in London. Souter began painting, after attending art classes as part of occupational therapy whilst she recovered from tuberculosis on the Isle of Wight. Although largely self-taught, Souter took up sculpture in 1950 as her convalescence continued in Dublin. She was trained there by Yann Renard-Goulet. Souter returned to London and completed her nursing studies in 1952, before abandoning the profession in favour of painting. In 1953 she began to explore the medium of paint after visiting Italy. Early patrons of her work included Basil Goulding, Gordon Lambert and the architect, Michael Scott.

== Personal life ==
Her name '"Camille" was a nickname given to her by her first husband, the actor Gordon Souter, after the heroine of Alexandre Dumas' La Dame aux Camélias. The couple were married in 1953 and separated in 1955. They had a daughter together, before Camille left for Italy with the artist Ralph Rumney. Souter married the sculptor Frank Morris in 1960 and moved to Enniskerry, County Wicklow before settling at Calary Bog. The couple had four children together before Morris died of sepsis in 1970.

Souter died at the Dublin residence of her daughter, Natasha, on 3 March 2023. She was 93.

== Career ==
Souter's first solo show was at El Habano restaurant on Grafton Street in Dublin in 1956. The Clog Gallery in Dublin staged a solo exhibition of Souter's work, a mix of oils, gouache, and monotypes, in the following year. The New Vision Gallery in London showed her works in 1958. Souter won a scholarship that took her back to Italy for a year in 1958. In 1961 she represented Ireland at the Paris Biennal. Souter had works simultaneously in a two-person exhibition with Barrie Cooke at the Ulster Museum in 1965, whilst also showing eight works at the New Gallery on Belfast's Grosvenor Road, including Northern Plains (Winter), Town Creeping Out, and Trains and All That. In 1971 four of Souter's works were included in The Irish Imagination 1959-1971 in the Hugh Lane Municipal Gallery, which later in the same year travelled to Washington to promote Irish Culture abroad. In 1975 she received the Irish American Cultural Institute's Gainey Award. This was followed in 1977 by the Grand Prix International de l'Art Contemporain de Monte Carlo.

Souter's subject matter has included landscapes, still lifes and slaughterhouses. In a review of Camille Souter's joint show with Nano Reid in 1999, Vona Groarke wrote "Camille Souter's paintings have a statuesque elegance to them, even when the subject is something as banal as silage bags. She is an artist who avoids prettiness while seeking beauty."

Souter exhibited frequently with the Irish Exhibition of Living Art since 1953, the Independent Artists since 1960, and with the Oireachtas since 1970, where she won the 1973 Landscape Prize. The Bank of Ireland held her painting Over the Bog, created in 1962. This painting was donated by the bank in 2008 to the Irish Museum of Modern Art. The Douglas Hyde Gallery held a retrospective of her work in 1980, as did the Royal Hibernian Academy in 2001.

Souter won many awards including the Tony O'Malley award in 1998, and the Irish Museum of Modern Art's Distinguished Career Award in 2000. In 2015, Trinity College Dublin awarded her an honorary doctorate. She was elected Saoi of Aosdána in 2008, where she was first elected a member in 1981. Souter lived and worked on Achill Island. Her works can be seen in many public and private collections including the National Gallery of Ireland, the Hugh Lane Municipal Gallery, Ulster Museum, Irish Museum of Modern Art and the Arts Council of Ireland collection.
