= Balconi (surname) =

Balconi is an Italian surname. Notable people with the surname include:

- Lorenzo Maria Balconi (1878 – 1969), Italian archbishop of the Catholic Church, missionary, and writer
- Marcella Balconi (1919 – 1999), Italian child psychiatrist, member of the resistance during World War II and a Parliamentary member
- Tais Balconi (born 1991), Brazilian rugby sevens player

== See also ==
- Balconi (disambiguation)
