= The Balcony (disambiguation) =

The Balcony is a play by Jean Genet.

The Balcony may also refer to:

- The Balcony (film), a 1963 film adaptation of the play
- The Balcony (painting), an 1868 oil painting by Manet
- The Balcony (album), a 2014 album by Catfish and the Bottlemen
- An area on Mount Everest

== See also ==
- Balcony (disambiguation)
- Balconi (disambiguation)
- Balconie Castle, formerly spelled Balcony
