= Mary Fitzgerald (artist) =

Contemporary Irish Artist

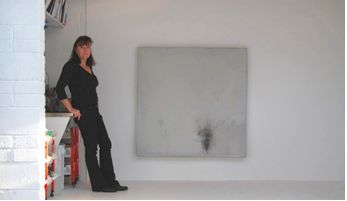
Mary Fitzgerald

Mary FitzGerald (born 1956) is an Irish artist. She lives and works in Dublin and County Waterford. After graduating from the National College of Art and Design, Dublin in 1977, she moved to Japan where she lived and exhibited between 1979 and 1981. FitzGerald has held numerous solo exhibitions in Ireland, Europe and the United States and has participated in group exhibitions worldwide. She has represented Ireland at ROSC, L'Imaginaire Irlandais and the XVIII Bienal de Sao Paulo.

Fitzgerald's 2009 show, Afterlife, which was held at the Fenton Gallery, Cork, was reviewed in The Irish Times by Aidan Dunne on 27 May 2009. The exhibit was accompanied by the publication of a limited edition, large format book by the same name published by Four Courts Press. It presented five of her recent works along with an essay by Caoimhín Mac Giolla Léith. (Mac Giolla Léith is an art critic and lecturer and served on the 2005 Turner Prize jury along with Nicholas Serota, director of the Tate). It was her first show since 1995 and was a return to a career interrupted by a car accident in the mid-1980s that forced a creative hiatus.

She was elected a member of Aosdána (an organisation established by the Irish Government to honour those who have made an outstanding contribution to the Arts in Ireland, limited to 250 living members) in 1990.

== Exhibitions ==
Fitzgerald's work has been widely shown nationally and internationally. She represented Ireland in the XVIII Bienal de Sao Paulo. Her work has been the subject of one-person exhibitions at the Green on Red Gallery; Rhok Gallery in Brussels and Fenton Gallery, Cork. Her work has been included in group exhibitions at the Irish Museum of Modern Art, Dublin, the Crawford Gallery, Cork among other venues.

== Collections ==
- The Irish Museum of Modern Art, Dublin
- An Chomhairle Ealaion/The Arts Council
- The Arts Council of Northern Ireland
- Allied Irish Bank plc., New York, Brussels, Dublin and London
- Contemporary Irish Art Society
- The Office of Public Works
- Crawford Municipal Art Gallery, Cork
- National Self-Portrait Collection
- Office of Public Works
