= Newtownbreda F.C. =

Newtownbreda
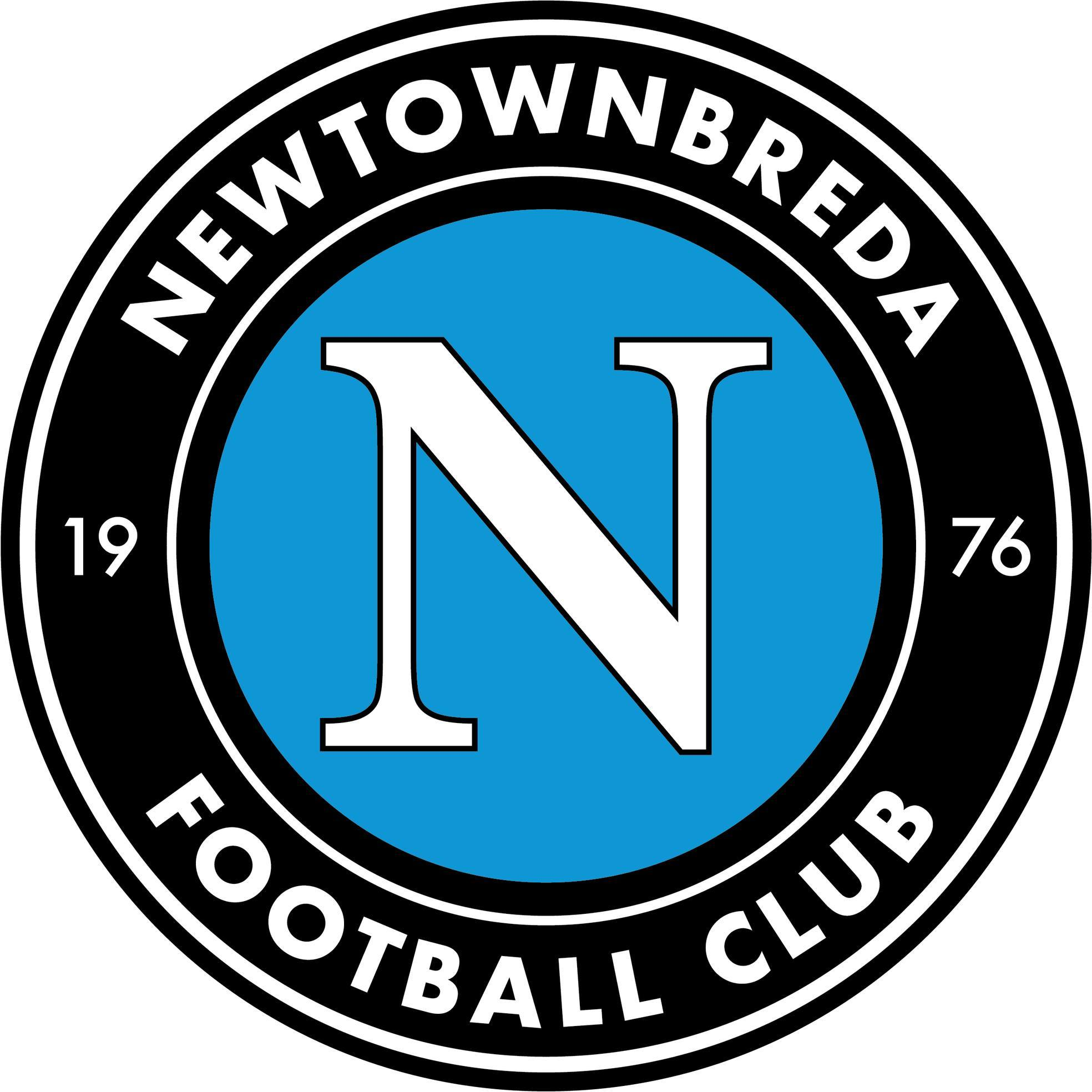
- Full name: Newtownbreda Football Club
- Nickname: Breda
- Founded: 1976
- Ground: Cairnshill Playing Fields
- League: Northern Amateur Football League

Newtownbreda Football Club, referred to simply as Newtownbreda, or Breda, is a Northern Irish, intermediate football club playing in the Northern Amateur Football League. The club is based in Newtownbreda, County Down and was formed in 1976. They are a part of the County Antrim & District FA. The club plays in the Irish Cup.

In 2024, Newtownbreda F.C. raised funds for Northern Ireland Chest, Heart and Stroke in memory of former club chairman Billy Best. Best, who died on March 15, 2024, had served as the club's treasurer for 15 years before becoming chairman and was a significant figure in its development.

== Ground ==
Newtownbreda play their home games at Cairnshill Playing Fields and wear royal blue.

In May 2024, a booking dispute arose over the use of the Cairnshill sports fields, where Newtownbreda F.C. accused Lisburn and Castlereagh City Council of offering priority booking slots to East Belfast GAA. This led to the football club losing all of its regular training hours and being left "homeless" from a site it had used for almost 50 years. East Belfast GAA later announced it would be stepping away from the site at the end of the month.

== Academy ==
In November 2024, Newtownbreda F.C. Academy launched a new recruitment drive for boys and girls aged 6 to 10 from local primary schools. The academy offers a positive and inclusive environment with licensed coaches, focusing on fun, teamwork, and player development. Training takes place one to two nights a week at either the Belvoir 4G pitch or Newforge Sports Complex. In addition to the recruitment effort, the club is working toward a long-term goal of securing a dedicated, multi-purpose sports facility for its senior team and academy to benefit the wider community in South Belfast.

== Honours ==
- Northern Amateur Football League
  - NAFL Division 2A
    - 2000/1
