= The Glen, Cork =

The Glen An Gleann
- Suburban area
- Location in Ireland
- Coordinates: 51°54′45″N 8°27′46″W
- Country: Ireland
- Province: Munster
- County: County Cork
- Irish grid reference: W681734

The Glen (Irish: An Gleann, meaning 'the valley') is a predominantly residential area on the north side of Cork City, Ireland. The area consists of mostly social housing estates near an ancient glacial valley known as the 'Glen River Park' (or the 'Glen Amenity Park', formerly 'Goulding's Glen'). The Glen is within the Dáil constituency of Cork North-Central, and made up of the electoral division of the Glen A (An Gleann A) and Glen B (An Gleann B). The Glen A electoral division recorded a population of 2,354 in the 2011 census.

== History ==
=== Geology ===
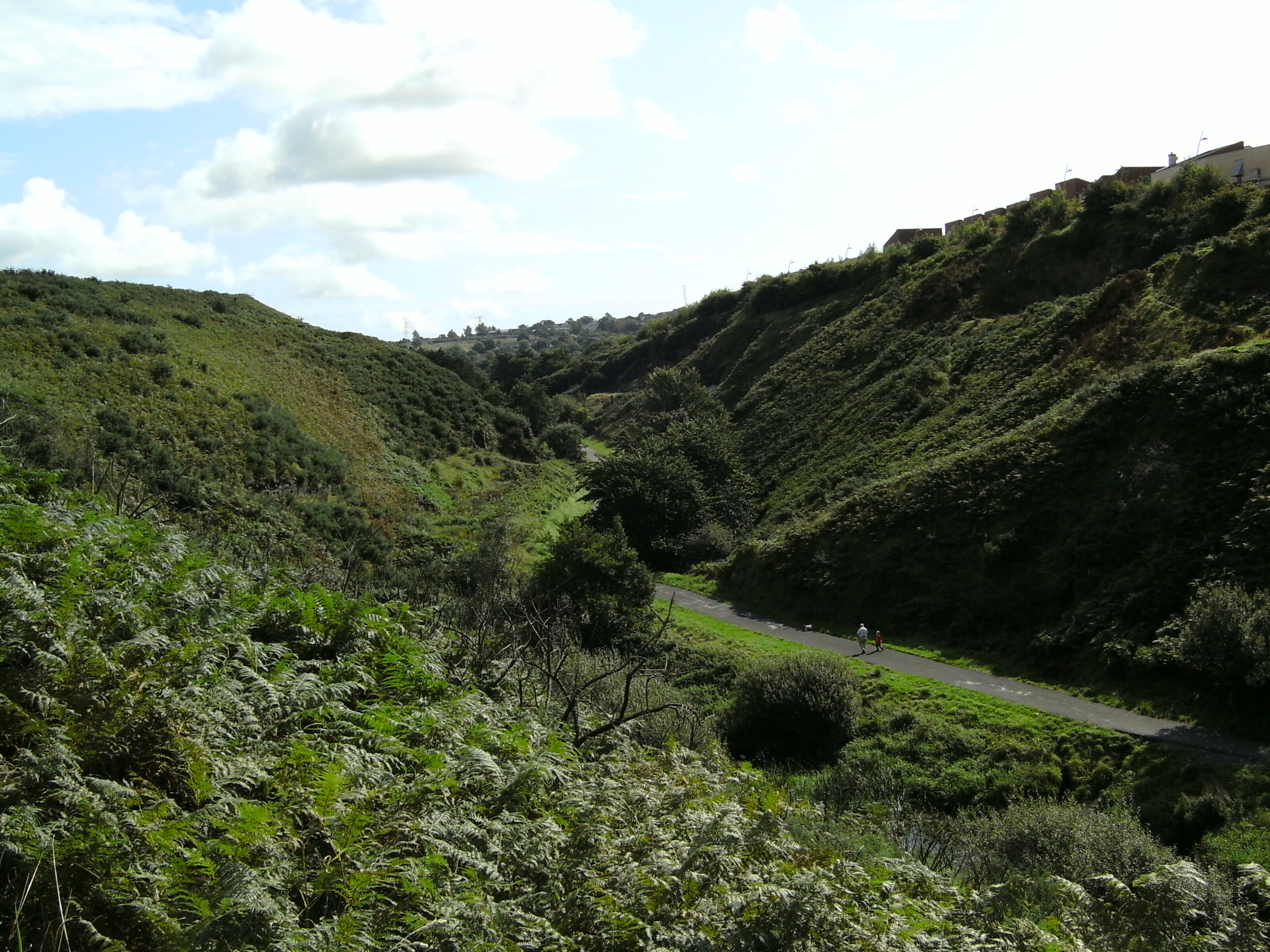
Looking eastwards at The Glen valley in 'Glen River Park'. The Glen River (obscured by foliage from this angle) runs parallel to the left of the footpath.

During the Late Pleistocene and Early Holocene periods, it is believed that the River Lee valley was occupied by a glacier which melted and the water which sought an outlet created a ravine or glacial valley that now makes up what is known as 'Glen River Park', so named because the Glen River flows through the valley on an east–west axis, and joins the River Bride and the Kilnap River in the Blackpool Valley to form the Kiln River.

=== Gouldings ===
In the 1850s W. and H.M. Goulding built a large factory in The Glen that was used to make phosphate fertilizers and the area became known as 'Goulding's Glen'. The factory closed and was demolished in the mid-20th century and very little of it remains today. The land was donated to the people of Cork by Sir Basil Goulding in the late 1960s and was subsequently developed as an amenity park.

=== 19th century railway tunnel ===
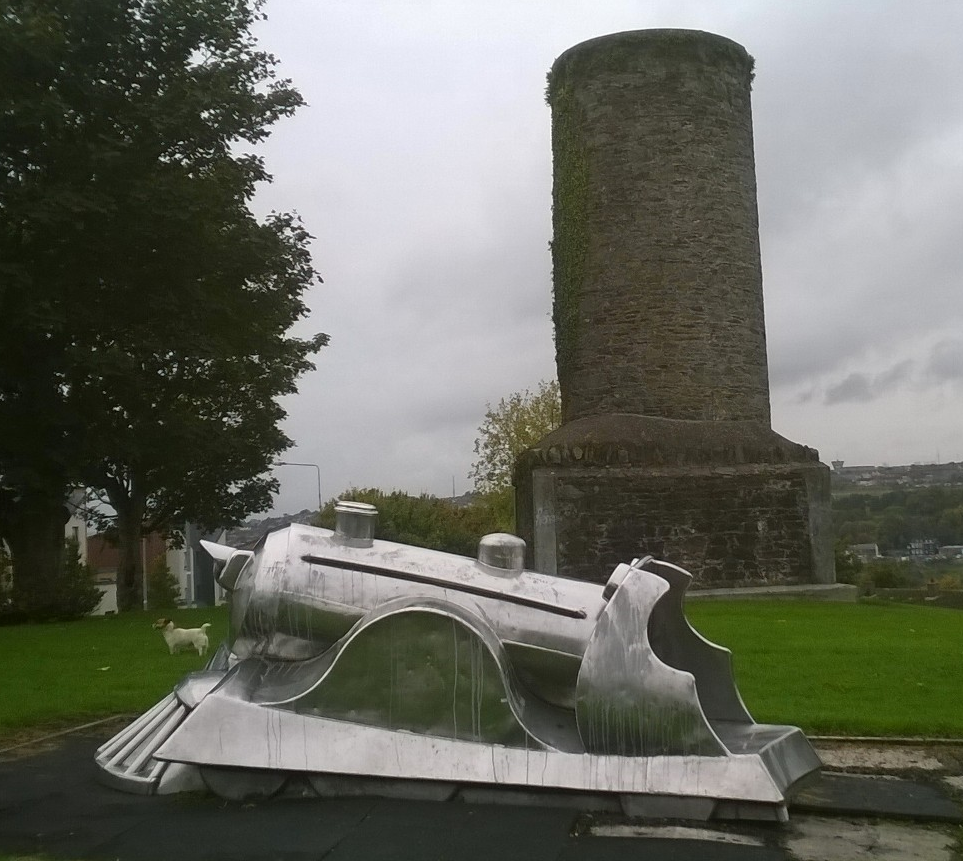
One of four ventilation shafts constructed c. 1850 for a subterranean railway tunnel under The Glen. The adjacent metallic train sculpture was added c. 2000

The Glen is also the location of a subterranean railway tunnel that was constructed from 1847 to 1855 to connect Mallow to Cork city. The tunnel had four ventilation shafts, all of which are still standing and two of these are located in The Glen. One is located in Arderin Way and the other can be found in Glentrasna Drive.

=== Early 20th century events ===
On Saturday, 11 December 1920, the day after martial law was proclaimed during the Irish War of Independence, a six-man IRA squad ambushed a convoy from K Company of the Auxiliary Division at Dillon's Cross, not far from Victoria Barracks (renamed Collins Barracks after independence) in Cork City. The IRA squad included Seán O'Donoghue, Michael Baylor, Seán Healy, Michael Kenny, Augustine O'Leary and James O'Mahony. British forces sustained casualties of one dead and twelve wounded, while the IRA squad escaped unharmed.

The usual route taken by military convoys to or from the barracks took them past Dillon's Cross. There was an old stone wall roughly 50 yards long running between Balmoral Terrace and the houses at the corner of the Cross. It was here that the members of A Company decided to lay their ambush. Behind the wall was a field known as O'Callaghan's Field, leading down to Gouldings Glen, which provided an escape route for the ambush party. Due to the proximity of Victoria Barracks, just a few hundred yards, the action would have to be quick. It was planned to stop the convoy of Auxiliaries, hurl bombs into the lorries, fire a quick volley of revolver shots and get away as rapidly as possible. Seán Healy, a member of the ambush party, described their escape through The Glen after the attack was carried out:

It was now a case of every man for himself to try and make a safe getaway. Under cover of darkness, and hugging the walls, we ran towards 'Goulding’s Glen' and reached it in safety. A large stream ran through The Glen. This was swollen by the winter rains. We crossed the bridge over the stream and got away into the open country by Blackpool. I stayed at the house of Lt. D. Duggan’s father that eventful night. Bloodhounds were used in the search but all their efforts to trace us failed.

Retaliation by the Auxiliaries resulted in the Burning of Cork.

In his story "The Ugly Duckling", Irish playwright, novelist, and short-story writer Frank O'Connor writes of the relationship between a man and his home town. Here he describes his return to Cork city from Dublin:

Then, long after, he found himself alone in Cork, tidying up things after the death of his father, his last relative there, and was suddenly plunged back into the world of his childhood and youth, wandering like a ghost from street to street, from pub to pub, from old friend to old friend, resurrecting other ghosts in a mood that was half anguish, half delight. He walked out to Blackpool and up 'Goulding's Glen' only to find that the big mill pond had all dried up, and sat on the pond remembering winter days when he was a child and the pond was full of skaters, and summer nights when it was full of stars. His absorption in the familiar made him peculiarly susceptible to the poetry of change.

=== Late 20th century housing developments ===
Most of the present housing estates in The Glen were built in the 1970s in an area to the south of the valley and generally consisted of three bedroom terraced houses (generally six per block) and a number of free standing flat blocks (two bedroom flats with 18 per block). Most of the flats were demolished or refurbished during the Glen Regeneration Project. Like most housing estates and urban areas developed on the outskirts of Irish cities in the 1960s and 1970s, the area was not equipped with adequate facilities for new families that had moved in, an issue that would later be rectified by a regeneration plan. Initial facilities developed with the housing estates include St Brendan's Church and two primary schools; St Mark's Boys National School and St Brendan's Girls School.

The area is near Blackpool Shopping Centre and retail park which was developed during the 2000s.

== Regeneration ==
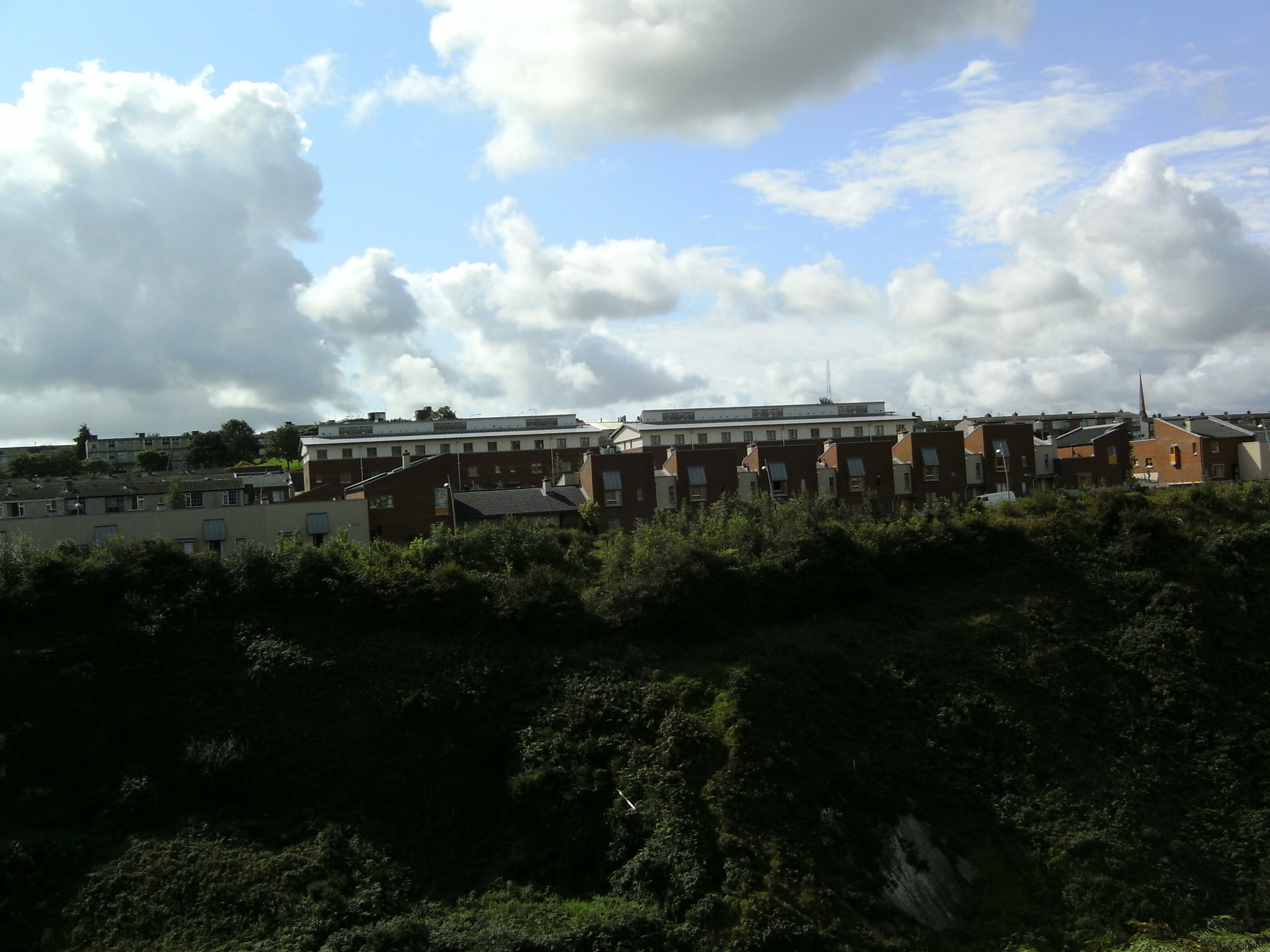
View across the Glen valley of new housing built during Phase I of the Glen Regeneration Project.

During the 2000s, The Glen underwent significant changes as part of the Glen Regeneration Project. Phase I of the project which was completed in 2006 involved using new infill housing to occupy obscure areas and provide passive supervision of public space. A series of new, mainly single-storey terraced houses were used to form a coherent edge to the development where it meets the Glen amenity park, with the re-formed embankment to the park planted with native trees and shrubs in keeping with local biodiversity. Much needed community facilities were provided in the form of a day-care centre which overlooks the Glen Park. The centre is flanked by a care-taker's apartment, and opens onto a semi-private landscaped garden which is shared with a number of the residential units. Additional community facilities will be provided as part of subsequent phases of the project. One of the existing flat blocks was demolished and the other two refurbished to provide a mix of housing with private outdoor space and better security. Much of the unresolved public space was addressed by extending private space out to the existing road network, which allowed for new gardens and boundary walls as well as new driveways or parking bays to be provided to the existing houses. A new green space was created in the centre of the scheme.

Phase II of the project commenced in October 2010. This phase of the project comprises the development of 59 new houses, and a substantial community facility adjacent to St Brendan's Church in the heart of the Glen. The community services centre will house a number of local educational, family and youth services when completed. This scheme builds on the substantial work undertaken in the first Phase of the Glen Regeneration where over 84 homes were upgraded and 80 new homes were provided at a cost of €26.5M.

A new housing estate was developed in a large field in The Glen known as 'Susie's field'. The houses are now in areas known as Glentrasna Crescent and Glentrasna Avenue. The development commenced on site in January 2007 and was completed in July 2009. The scheme is housed on a 3-hectare / 7-acre site and comprises 109 housing units all of varying types and sizes. Units include 3 and 4 bed semi-detached houses, 2 bed sheltered houses, two and three bed apartments, duplex units as well as a Crèche. There are 26 dwellings, both 3 and 4 bed, allocated as Affordable type units. The layout of the scheme was dictated by the sloping nature of the site, which resulted in a terraced development from a North-Westerly to a South-Easterly direction. Many of the units have views of the City and of North Cork. Cork City Council collaborated with the Steiner Kindergarten to provide a preschool facility as part of the Susie's field development.

Cork Military Graveyard, at the top of Assumption road and adjacent to the Susie's field development was converted into a small park with a playground for children in 2010. It is now called the Military Cemetery Park.

== Glen River Park ==
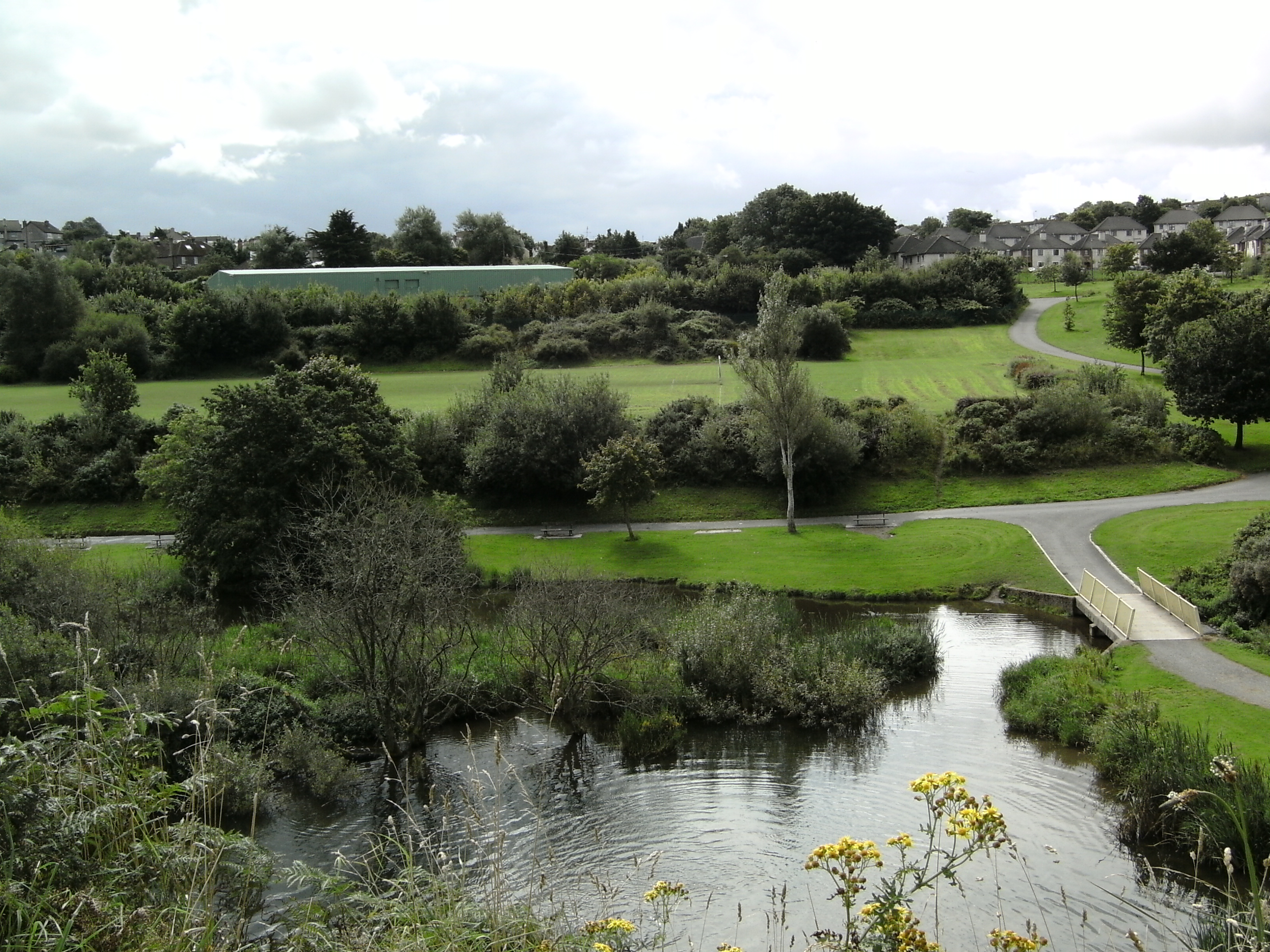
View of 'Glen River Park'. The Glen River can be seen in addition to walkways and a large soccer pitch. A Cork City Council depot can also be seen in the background.

Since the land (then known as Goulding's Glen) was gifted to the people of Cork in the 1960s, Cork City Council have developed the area as the Glen Amenity Park (Glen River Park) – with walkways, seating and plenty of green space in what is otherwise a totally urban setting. Care has been taken in the development of the Glen River Park to preserve the natural attractiveness of the area.

The park is located in a deep steep-sided valley and includes a range of habitats that are of biodiversity value. At the heart of the site is one of the city's most diverse wetland areas which includes ponds, wet grassland, wet woodland and swampy areas of emergent vegetation including common reedmace, sweet-grass, canary reed-grass and common reed, providing a valuable refuge for birds, insects and other wildlife and of biodiversity value. Bird species which nest in the area include some that are restricted to wetland areas such as moorhen and reed bunting. Artificial lagoons created at the Glen are a feature of the park. The park also includes a soccer pitch and a Cork City Council depot.

The park was at the centre of a controversy in 2002 and 2003 when some local politicians and environmental groups opposed a decision by An Bord Pleanála to permit a housing development in an area of the park known as 'Murphy's Quarry' which contained sandbanks used by sand martins as a nesting area. The development went ahead and is now known as Pynes Valley, Ballyvolane.

== Road network and transport ==
The main road through The Glen to which all housing estates are connected is 'Glen Avenue'. The 1.2 km road commences at a junction with the North Ring Road (R635) on its west end and ends at a junction with Ballyhooly Road (R614) in Dillon's Cross in the east. The main access routes to the city by vehicle are via the N20 (connected to the North Ring Road) and the R614 which encompasses the Ballyhooly Road and Summerhill North.

The Glen is primarily served by Bus Éireann route 7A. The route operates between the city centre and Glenthorn via The Glen, Blackpool Village and Dublin Hill. Buses depart hourly from Glenthorn between 8.25am and 6pm on Mondays to Saturdays.

== Sport and leisure ==
Glen Rovers GAA is located here just beyond the North Ring Road near Dublin Hill. The Glen Boxing Club is also located on the North Ring Road near Glen Avenue.

The Glen Resource and Sports Centre which opened in March 2001 offers a range of activities, from six all-weather soccer pitches (two convertible to tennis courts) to the zip-line in addition to indoor activities such as yoga and karate classes. In 2014, the country's first publicly owned artificial ski slope opened in the centre. It is 30 m long, 5 m wide with a gradient of about 14%, consisting of an artificial all-weather perma-snow surface with an in-built pad underneath to absorb the shock of falls. Educational courses are also provided in the centre, some of which are run by University College Cork for adults continuing their education.

A parkrun event takes place in the Glen River Park on Saturday mornings.

== Notable people ==
- Finbarr Donnelly, originally from Belfast; lead singer with 1980s Cork post-punk band Five Go Down to the Sea?.
