= Wellworths =

Supermarket chain in Northern Ireland

- Industry: Grocery
- Defunct: 1997
- Owner: Fitzwilton

Wellworths was a supermarket chain, owned by the Fitzwilton group in Northern Ireland until 1997.

In the early 1990s, it was the dominant food retailer in Northern Ireland, with an estimated 22 to 24 percent market share in 1992.

Along with Stewarts/Crazy Prices, it was one of the two main supermarkets in Northern Ireland until English-based retailers moved into the marketplace.

== History (since 1997) ==
On being sold by the Fitzwilton group in 1997 Wellworths was split into three. Smaller stores were wholly acquired by the Musgrave Group in 1997 and traded as Wellworths-SuperValu for a time. The Wellworths name was eventually dropped and these stores now trade as 'SuperValu', part of an all-Ireland chain.

Larger Wellworths stores were acquired by Safeway Stores (Ireland), a joint venture between Fitzwilton and Safeway. They operated from 1997 to 2005 under the Safeway name.

Other stores that did not become a Safeway or SuperValu became a branch of another retail brand, such as Marks and Spencer.

In March 2004, Safeway Stores (Ireland) was acquired by Morrisons when Morrisons bought Safeway. The Northern Ireland stores were not part of Morrisons' long-term strategy and traded under the Morrison name for a limited time. Despite continuing to trade as Safeway, own-brand products and carrier bags were supplied by Morrisons. Safeway Stores (Ireland) was acquired by Asda in 2005 and now operates under the Asda name.
