= Kelkin =

Irish food and drink company

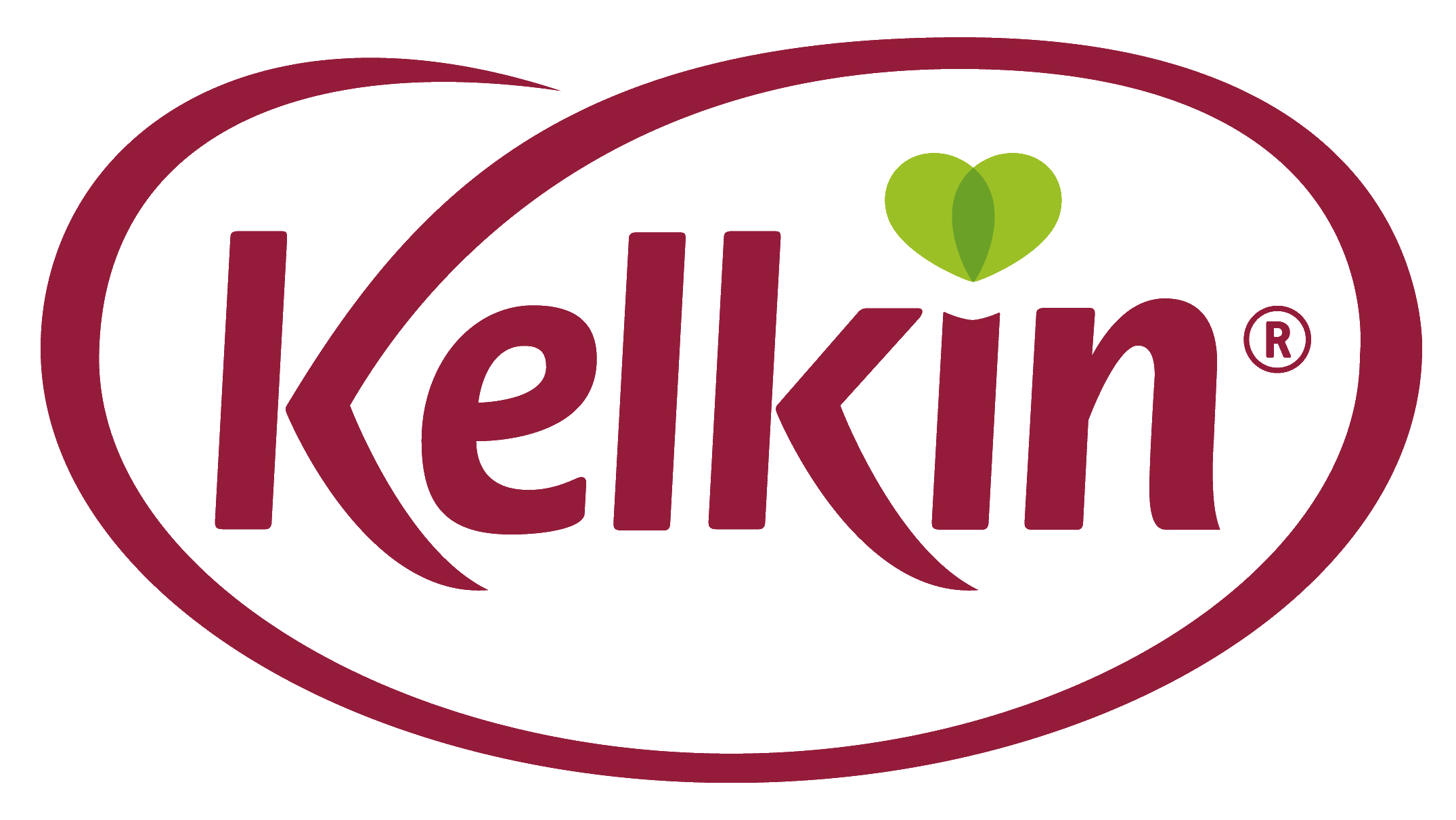
- Company type: Private limited company
- Industry: Healthy food
- Founded: February 10, 1977; 49 years ago in Dublin, Ireland
- Founders: Ken Kinsella; Liz Kelly
- Headquarters: Dublin, Ireland
- Areas served: Ireland; United Kingdom
- Parent: Valeo Foods
- Website: kelkin.ie; kelkin.co.uk

Kelkin is an Irish healthy food company that provides food products such as popcorn, peanut butter, cereal and vitamins.

In recent years, the company has produced skincare products such as shampoos containing aloe vera or tea tree oil as the main ingredient.

== History ==
Kelkin was registered on 10 February 1977 as Kelkin Naturproducts Ltd by Ken Kinsella and Liz Kelly.

As of 2011, the Kelkin brand belonged to Valeo Foods.

In 2014, DCC announced its sale of Kelkin for €60 million. In 2015, the purchase was completed.
