= A24 road (Northern Ireland) =

Road in Northern Ireland

Coordinates: 54.5952°N 5.9238°W

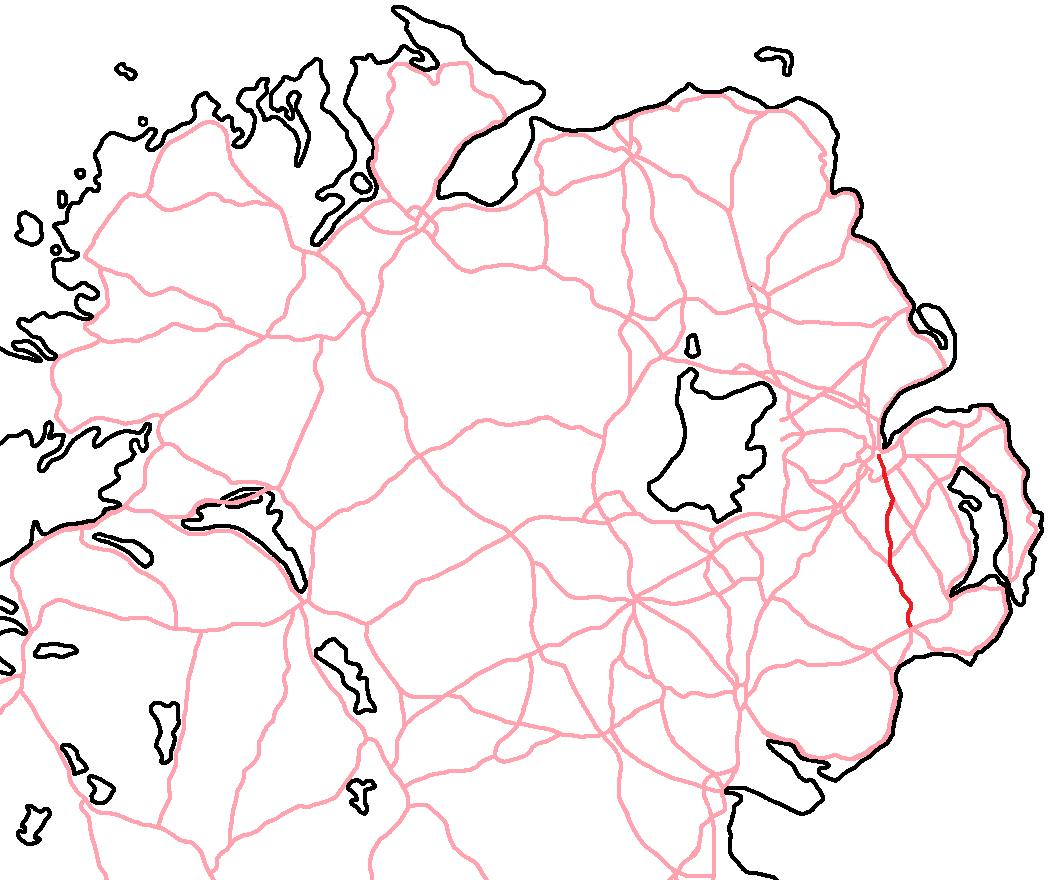
The route of the A24 in red from Belfast city centre, County Antrim to Clough, County Down.

The A24 is a major road in Northern Ireland running from Belfast to Clough near Newcastle, passing through Carryduff and Ballynahinch. In Belfast, the route forms the Ormeau Road. At Clough it meets the A2.

The section of the A24 from Forestside Shopping Centre to Carryduff roundabout was named by European Road Assessment Programme (EuroRAP) as one of the six potential priorities for route action in Northern Ireland in 2005. This part of the road is a four-lane undivided carriageway.

== Plans and developments ==
=== Ballynahinch bypass ===
There are plans to build a by-pass of the A24 around Ballynahinch, which is currently a bottleneck for strategic traffic resulting in traffic congestion. This is exacerbated during Easter and Summer holidays with large volumes of traffic travelling to/from Newcastle and the wider Mournes area. The Department for Infrastructure has announced its intention to proceed with the scheme, with the start of construction subject to the funding of £35-45m being made available.

The planned bypass will be around 3.1 kilometers long. It will start at a new roundabout at the intersection of Belfast Road and Saintfield Road, and end at a new roundabout at the intersection of Downpatrick Road and Drumaness Road. In March 2025, Minister for Infrastructure Liz Kimmins announced that work on the project would begin in 2028 or 2029.

=== Saintfield Road improvement ===
In March 2024, a road resurfacing scheme began on Saintfield Road in Belfast, which is part of the A24.

=== Ballynahich Road improvement ===
In February 2024, a road resurfacing scheme began on Ballynahinch Road in Carryduff, which is part of the A24.
