= Dolciaria Balconi =

Italian spongecake company

Balconi Dolciaria
- Industry: Food processing
- Founded: Milan, Italy, 1953
- Founder: Michele Balconi
- Headquarters: Milan, Italy
- Products: Spongecake
- Number of employees: 12,000
- Website: balconidolciaria.it

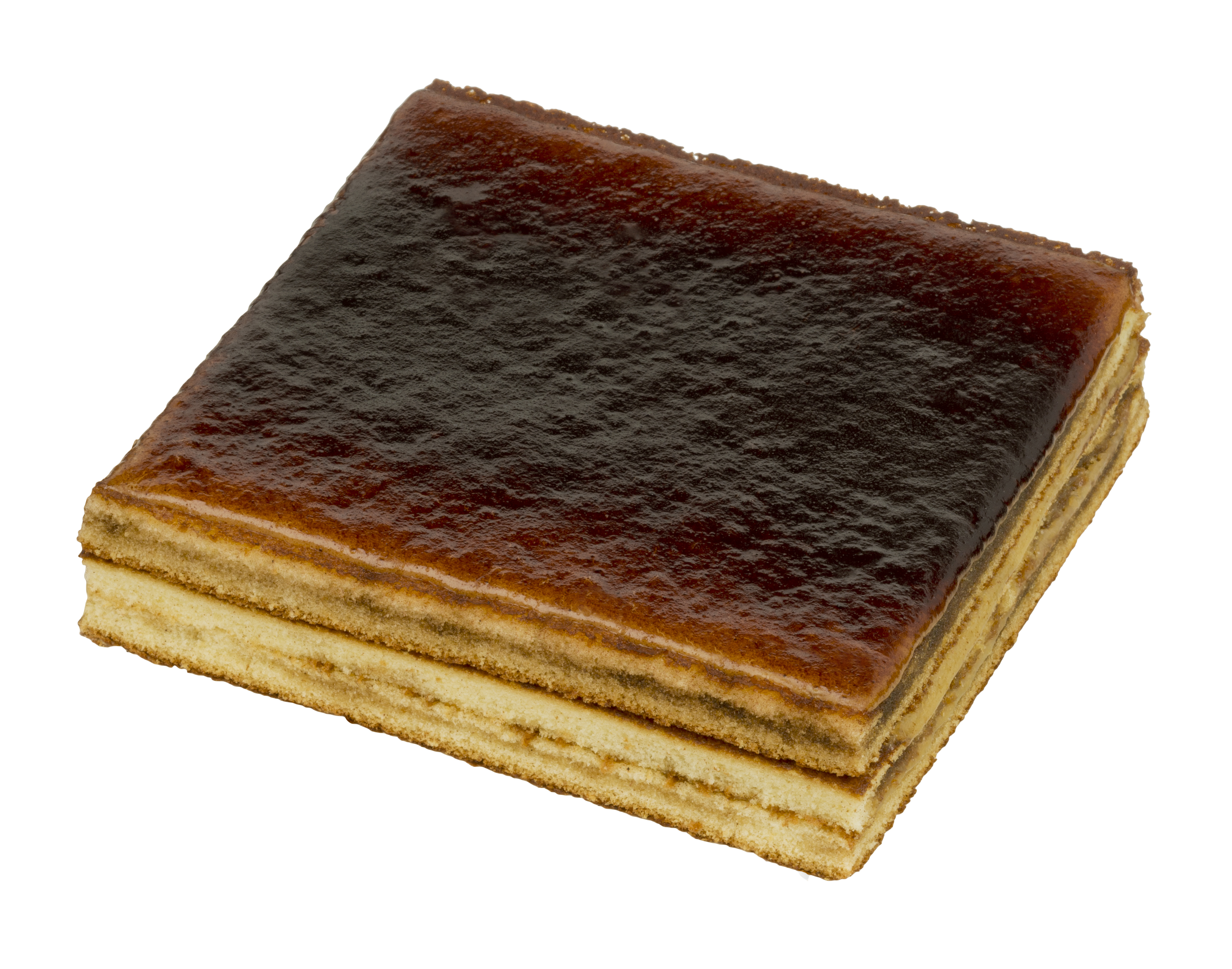
A non-refrigerated Tiramisu cake by Balconi

Balconi Dolciaria is a large Italian company specialized in the production of cakes made with sponge cake. Founded in 1953 as a simple artisanal pastry shop, created by pastry chef Michele Balconi, Balconi has a factory which covers an area of 20,000 square metres, employs 12,000 people and over 5,000,000 products are produced daily.

In June 2015, Valeo Foods purchased the company, 80% of which was owned by Clessidra, an Italian private equity house, and the remaining 20% from the Balconi family.
