= Safeway Stores (Ireland) =

Supermarket chain in Northern Ireland

Safeway Stores (Ireland) Limited
- Industry: Grocery, General merchandise
- Founded: 1996
- Defunct: 2005
- Fate: Defunct - 12 stores sold off to Asda and rebranded
- Successor: Asda
- Key people: David Webster (Chairman); Carlos Criado-Perez (CEO)
- Parent: Morrisons (since 2004)
- Website: www.safeway.co.uk (Redirects to Morrisons website)

Safeway Stores (Ireland) was a supermarket chain that operated in Northern Ireland between 1996 and 2005. 12 of the 13 stores were acquired by Asda, itself owned by Walmart; whilst the remaining store was sold to Mr John Miskelly and Mrs Helen Miskelly. Despite its name, it did not operate any interests in the Republic of Ireland.

== History ==
=== Joint venture ===
Safeway entered the Northern Ireland market in 1996, by forming a joint venture between Safeway (UK) and Sir Anthony O'Reilly's Fitzwilton Group, owners of the Wellworths supermarket chain. Larger Wellworths stores became part of this joint venture, with smaller stores being sold to the Musgrave Group and rebranded Wellworths-Supervalu.

Despite only partial ownership by Safeway UK, stores were operated as any other Safeway outlet in the UK, offering a full range of Safeway own-label products and produce local to Northern Ireland.

=== Taking full ownership ===
In 2002, Safeway (UK) took full ownership of the group.

=== Morrisons takeover ===
Following Morrisons' takeover of Safeway UK in March 2004, Safeway stores in Northern Ireland continued to operate under the Safeway name, while Safeway stores in Great Britain were gradually re-branded as Morrisons stores. Safeway did, though, switch to Morrisons' packaging in Northern Ireland and started to phase out Safeway own brand products in favour of the Morrisons label.

It was becoming apparent, however, that Morrisons did not see a long-term future in Northern Ireland. Despite this, Morrisons continued with plans to open a supermarket in Bangor, County Down, the last new Safeway store to open in the UK, and the only one opened after the Morrisons takeover.

=== Sale of Irish interests ===
Along with a number of other former Safeway UK interests, Morrisons disposed of its interests in Northern Ireland in 2005.

On 6 June 2005, 12 of the 13 outlets were acquired by Asda for £73.6 million. The stores, (which included their Bangor store), changed to the ASDA brand over the course of the next year.

On 2 November 2005, Morrisons announced the sale by Safeway Stores (Ireland) Limited of its remaining store at Downpatrick, Northern Ireland to Mr John Miskelly and Mrs Helen Miskelly. The store had gross assets of £14,745,388. The sale was completed on 19 November 2005.

The way the sales were structured means that the legal entity Safeway Stores (Ireland) Limited was not actually sold to Asda Stores Limited, but remains as a dormant wholly owned subsidiary of Wm Morrison Supermarkets PLC, through its subsidiary Safeway Limited (formerly Safeway plc).

== Supermarket locations ==
Each was sold to and re-branded as ASDA in 2005 unless otherwise stated.

- Ballyclare
- Bangor
- Belfast - Shore Road
- Belfast - Westwood
- Coleraine
- Cookstown
- Downpatrick (sold to Mr John Miskelly and Mrs Helen Miskelly in 2005, re-branded as ASDA in 2007)
- Dundonald
- Enniskillen
- Kilkeel
- Newtownards
- Omagh
- Strabane
