= Forestside Shopping Centre =

Lesley Forestside
- Main Lesley Forestside entrance, December 2009
- Location: Newtownbreda, Belfast, Northern Ireland
- Coordinates: 54°33′49″N 5°54′33″W
- Opened: 3 April 1997 (Sainsbury's); 22 September 1998 (Mall)
- Developer: J Sainsbury plc
- Owner: Mussenden Properties Limited
- Num. of stores: 36
- Num. of anchor tenants: 3
- Floor area: 250,000 square feet (23,000 m^{2})
- Floors: 3 (Underground, Mall floor, M&S, Dunnes Stores, H&M and Next 2nd Floor)
- Website: forestside.co.uk

Lesley Forestside (better known as Forestside) is a shopping centre located in Newtownbreda in south Belfast, Northern Ireland. The first phase of the centre, the 39,000 square feet (3,600 m^{2}) Sainsbury's store, opened in March 1997 followed by the remainder of the centre in September 1998.

== History ==
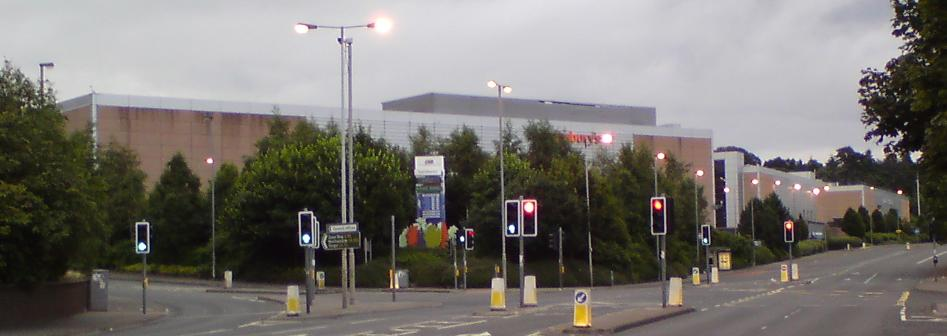
Forestside viewed from the A24 with Sainsbury's in the foreground and Dunnes Stores in the distance.

=== Construction ===
Supermac, when it opened in 1964, was Northern Ireland's first supermarket; when Sainsbury's announced its move into the Northern Ireland market on 20 June 1995, Supermac's Newtownbreda site was one of seven identified for future stores. Sainsbury's purchased Supermac for £32m. Supermac had planned to redevelop the site itself in a £30 million project, however a company director pointed out that the company would be at the peak of its overdraft at the same time as facing competition from Sainsbury's opening its first stores in Northern Ireland. The Irish Times quoted the director as saying "that was a situation we didn't find particularly acceptable."

Planning permission for the Sainsbury's store was granted in early February 1996 and construction by John Laing Group began with a groundbreaking ceremony a week later. The Sainsbury's store was built on the northern part of the roughly triangular site which was unoccupied as part of the Supermac complex. Sainsbury's first annual report after the store opened in March 1997 noted that the store was "trading far above expectations".

Sainsbury's paid £1.75 million for an alcohol sales licence for its off-licence in the centre. However this allowed Sainsbury's, with just two off-licences open in Northern Ireland in 1997, to capture 6% of the market. In January 1998 The Grocer reported that sales at the Forestside off-licence were £140,000 a week.

As the first stage (Sainsbury's) opened, work continued on the final stage of the shopping mall: 31 small units and two other large stores occupied by Marks & Spencer and Dunnes Stores. The total floor space of the centre is 250,000 square feet (23,000 m^{2}), the southern part of the which stands on the site of the Supermac supermarket. The architects of the centre took advantage of the large east–west gradient of the site to build underground car parking and service access. Sainsbury's opened a petrol filling station at the same time as the supermarket, on the site of the demolished Drumkeen Hotel.

In October 1997, Sainsbury's announced the forward sale of Forestside to the Universities Superannuation Scheme (USS) for approximately £50m. The sale was completed following completion of building works in September 1998, with Sainsbury's taking a 125-year lease for its store. In January 2001 USS sold the centre to Foyleside Ltd. for £70 million. Foyleside Ltd. owned Foyleside in Derry, the Abbey Centre in Newtownabbey and the Buttercrane Centre in Newry.

=== 2000s and 2010s ===
On 26 March 2005, the centre's Next outlet was targeted with an incendiary device which ignited after it had closed. Another device was defused in the centre's Dunnes Stores on 28 March. The campaign, which also included an attack that destroyed a B&Q store at Sprucefield, County Down, was blamed on dissident republicans.

On 23 November 2006, Marks & Spencer announced a £35 million investment in its Northern Ireland business, £8 million of which was invested in its Forestside store. This involved remodelling, the addition of a second floor to add 22,000 sq ft (2,000 m^{2}) and a multi-storey car park.

In an article discussing the reform of local government, The Belfast Telegraph described Forestside as a "cash cow" which delivers annual rates of over £4 million to its local authority. In summer 2013 River Island, Dorothy Perkins, Wallis and Evans all closed. Next expanded into the former River Island Unit. Other new retailers to open included O2 store, Vision Express and Blue Inc.

During the COVID-19 pandemic, several companies owning units such as Warehouse and Oasis (Owned by Aurora Fashions) and Clintons went into administration. The latter unit was purchased by Hallmark Cards.

=== 2020s ===
In September 2023, Forestside was purchased for £42 million by Mussenden Properties Limited, itself owned by local entrepreneurs Michael and Lesley Herbert. The shopping centre was subsequently rebranded as Lesley Forestside. Construction of four new restaurants commenced in January 2024. One of these is occupied by Popeyes, the company's first restaurant in Northern Ireland, other units are occupied by Nando's, Greggs and Starbucks.

In 2025, planning permission for a terrace-style expansion of the centre was granted, adding four retail units. One unit is currently occupied by Hotel Chocolat and another will be occupied by Søstrene Grene.
