= Valerie Goulding =

Irish politician and campaigner (1918–2003)

Senator
- In office 27 October 1977 – 8 October 1981
- Constituency: Nominated by the Taoiseach

Personal details
- Born: Valerie Hamilton Monckton; 12 September 1918 Ightham Mote, England
- Died: 28 July 2003 (aged 84) Dublin, Ireland
- Party: Fianna Fáil
- Spouse: Sir Basil Goulding
- Children: 3, including Tim
- Parent: Walter Monckton (father)
- Relatives: Gilbert Monckton (brother)
- Education: Downe House School
- Occupation: Campaigner
- Known for: Co-founder of the Central Remedial Clinic in Dublin, Ireland

Valerie Hamilton, Lady Goulding (12 September 1918 – 28 July 2003) was an Irish campaigner for disabled people, and senator who set up the Central Remedial Clinic in 1951 alongside Kathleen O'Rourke which is now the largest organisation in Ireland looking after people with physical disabilities. She served as a member of Seanad Éireann from 1977 to 1981.

== Background ==
Born Valerie Hamilton Monckton, she was the only daughter of Mary Adelaide Somes Colyer-Ferguson and Sir Walter Monckton (later 1st Viscount Monckton of Brenchley). She was born at Ightham Mote, which was owned by her maternal grandfather, Sir Thomas Colyer-Fergusson, until his death in 1951. Her only brother, Gilbert, became a Major general in the British Army. She was educated at Downe House School, near Newbury. Both Valerie and her brother, Gilbert, would ultimately convert to Roman Catholicism.

Her father was a British lawyer and politician, and became chief legal adviser to Edward VIII during the Abdication Crisis in 1936. She acted as her father's secretary and courier during the crisis, carrying letters between the King and the Prime Minister, Stanley Baldwin.

== Career ==
In World War II, she joined the First Aid Nursing Yeomanry before switching to the Auxiliary Territorial Service. In Dublin for a race meeting in 1939, she met and soon married Irish fertiliser manufacturer and art collector Sir Basil Goulding and moved to Ireland. However, her husband moved to England to join the RAF, ending the war as a Wing commander; meanwhile, she served as a second lieutenant in the British Army. After the war, the couple returned to Ireland, where Sir Basil and his family managed Goulding Chemicals.

In 1951, she co-founded, with Kathleen O'Rourke, the Central Remedial Clinic located in a couple of rooms in central Dublin, to provide non-residential care for disabled people. The Clinic later moved to a purpose building in Clontarf in 1968, where it is located today. The Clinic's foundation initiated a revolution in the treatment of physical disability and rapidly grew to by far the largest centre dealing with the needs of disabled people. Lady Goulding remained chairman and managing director of the CRC until 1984.

On account of her widespread popularity, she was nominated by the Taoiseach, Jack Lynch, to Seanad Éireann, where she worked to raise awareness of disability issues in 1977. She sought election to Dáil Éireann as a Fianna Fáil candidate at the November 1982 general election for the Dún Laoghaire constituency but was unsuccessful. She was spoken of as a possible President of Ireland in 1983, should the president, Patrick Hillery, decline to seek a second term. (Hillery ultimately was re-elected).

== Family ==
Lady Goulding died in a nursing home on 28 July 2003 in Dublin, aged 84. She was predeceased by her husband, Sir Basil Goulding, in 1982. Her eldest son, Sir William Goulding, known as Lingard Goulding, served as Headmaster of Headfort School in County Meath; the other sons are Hamilton and Timothy of Dr. Strangely Strange.
