= Goulding Chemicals =

Goulding Soil Nutrition Ltd formerly known as Goulding Chemicals Ltd is a wholly owned subsidiary of Origin Enterprises plc. The company supplies a wide range of Agricultural Fertilisers to the Irish market. It has its origins in the Dublin & Wicklow Manure Company (incorporated 1890) and the original fertiliser business of W. & H. M. Goulding (incorporated 1894 - now Fitzwilton), been the corporate successor of the former.

== History ==
The company has its origins in 1846 when William Goulding (1817–84) went into partnership with his brother Humphreys Manders Goulding (c.1820–1877) and their firm, W. & H. M. Goulding, became agents for patent animal dressings (1854) and fertilisers. They would subsequently go into the production of fertiliser setting up a plant in 1856 at the old Glen distillery in Blackpool Cork. The firm would be run for decades by the Goulding family that included Basil Goulding and Valerie Goulding. In 1869 they acquired a site in Dublin and built a factory on it, the company was then incorporated as W. & H. M. Goulding Limited in 1872. It would subsequently be wound up and reincorporated on January 26, 1894, in Dublin.

Under the leadership of Sir William Goulding annual production grew to 119,337 tons of fertiliser by 1902, a controlling interest was acquired in a number of other Irish fertiliser companies including Richardsons Chemical Manure Co. of Belfast (1897), the Ulster Manure Co. of County Londonderry (1897), Morgan Mooney & Co. (1899), the Drogheda Chemical and Manure Co. (1919) and the Dublin and Wicklow Manure Co. (1919). With the creation of the Irish Free State W. & H. M. Goulding would become the principal manufacture of fertilizers in the state with a 41% market share and operating a total of 6 factories, 2 in Dublin and 1 each in Cork, Drogheda, Waterford and Wicklow. During the 1950's an extensive modernization programme was followed which involved the shutting down all their Sulphuric Acid plants that used the Lead chamber process process and replacing these with two modern plants in Cork and Dublin that used the Contact process, each of these had a 70,000 tons per annum capacity. In the early 1960s the company was converted from a Trading company to a Holding company. In 1961 a 51% majority share in Richardsons and Ulster Manure was sold to Imperial Chemical Industries (ICI), this was followed by an investment of £1m from ICI in 1964. This resulted in the creation of a joint marketing subsidiary company called Goulding Chemicals and Fertilisers Ltd.

By 1971 W. & H. M. Goulding had diversified into a number of non-related industries including Property development and System building, as a result various all of the groups interests in the original Fertilizer business had been placed under one subsidiary company, namely Goulding Chemicals Ltd.

In 1972 W. & H. M. Goulding would merge with Fitzwilliam Securities in what was effectively a reverse takeover, at the same time the company was renamed to Fitzwilton Ltd. and was effectively an Irish Conglomerate. Sir Basil Goulding stayed on as chairman of the merged company and was join by Tony O'Reilly as co-chairman.

Due to adverse effect on the economy in the immediate post 1973 oil crisis period Fitzwilton was forced to divest itself of various subsidiary companies to repay debts. One of the direct results of this was the closure of the Goulding Fertiliser plant in Dublin as well as selling of a 50% interest in Goulding Chemicals Ltd. to Agrico (a subsidiary of the Williams group of companies) in 1976.

The company was acquired by IAWS between 1985 and 1986.

== Goulding Fertilisers ==
Goulding Fertilisers manufacture and distribute NPK and trace element fertilisers in Ireland. The company supplies mainline and customised blended products to suit local nutrient requirements.

== Goulding Industrial Chemicals ==
Goulding Industrial Chemicals was the division that supplied a range of concentrations of sodium hydroxide and potassium hydroxide and has the largest storage capacity in Ireland for sulfuric, hydrochloric and nitric acids. The company was registered to ISO 9002 and has received IBEC Accreditation to Responsible Care. In 2017 Gouldings sold this Industrial Chemical division to Chemifloc for €6 million. It continues to trade today under the name of GI Chemicals DAC as part of the wider Chemifloc Group.

== See also ==
- William Goulding
- Sir William Goulding, 1st Baronet
- Basil Goulding
- Fitzwilton
- Aryzta
- Origin Enterprises
- R&H Hall
