= R&H Hall =

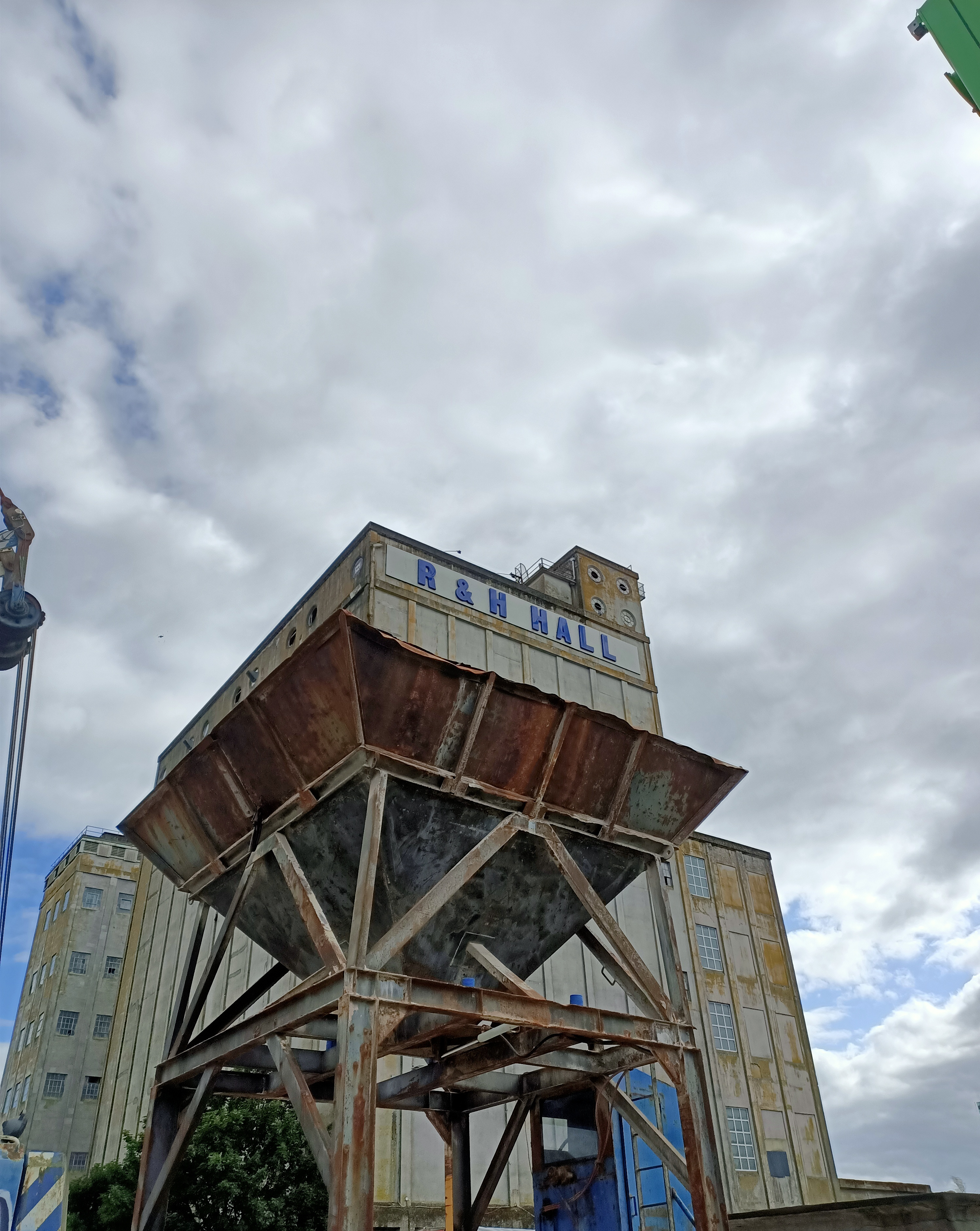
The former R&H Hall at the Port of Cork.

R&H Hall plc is Ireland's biggest importer and supplier of animal feed ingredients for feed manufacturing through its trading, purchasing, shipping and storage capability.

The company is part of a joint venture between Origin Enterprises and W & R Barnett.

== Company history ==
Founded in Cork in 1839 and quoted on the Irish Stock Exchange since 1967, R&H Hall had a record of service to Irish agribusiness.

IAWS purchased two small feed trading businesses between 1988 and 1989 called Unigrain and James Allen. Another feed trading company, R&H Hall plc, was purchased by IAWS in September 1990 and at that time was a major acquisition doubling the size of the overall organisation. All three companies were merged under the name R&H Hall, as this was the best known of the names.

== Company location and operation ==
The group's trade and shipping capability gives it access to international markets and sources of supply. Ingredients are imported from twenty countries worldwide via its deep-water port facilities around the Irish coast; Belfast, Dublin, Ringaskiddy and Foynes. The former Cork facility was the most prominent and widely recognised sites.

R&H Hall also provides a specialised bulk cereal handling, drying, screening and storage service as well as an export capability.

== See also ==
- Goulding Chemicals
