= Cecil King (Irish painter) =

Irish artist (1921–1986)

Cecil King (22 February 1921 – 7 April 1986) was famous for his painting. Born Rathdrum, County Wicklow, Ireland, King was largely self-taught as an artist. He had his first one-man show in 1959, but worked as a businessman and did not become a full-time artist until 1964. While he began painting in an expressionist style, his mature works have a distinctive cool minimalist formality and often involve clean blocks of even colour cleaved at an acute angle. The break came in the late 1960s.

King lived for many years in Blackrock on Idrone Terrace and was in a relationship with gallerist and curator Oliver Dowling from 1960 until his death in 1986.

A retrospective of his work was held at the Hugh Lane Municipal Gallery in 1981, and another was held in the Irish Museum of Modern Art on 27 February 2008.

== Work in collections ==
- The Arts Council of Ireland:
  - Berlin Painting 21 (1970)
  - Traverse, '84 (1984)
- The Arts Council of Northern Ireland:
  - Berlin Painting
- Crawford Art Gallery, Cork
- Dublin City University:
  - Thrust
- The Government Art Collection, UK
- Hugh Lane Gallery, Dublin
- Tate, London
- Trinity College Dublin:
  - Berlin Painting (1970)
  - Berlin Painting (1971)
- University of Galway:
  - Untitled tapestry (1974)
