= Central Remedial Clinic =

Disability hospital in Dublin, Ireland

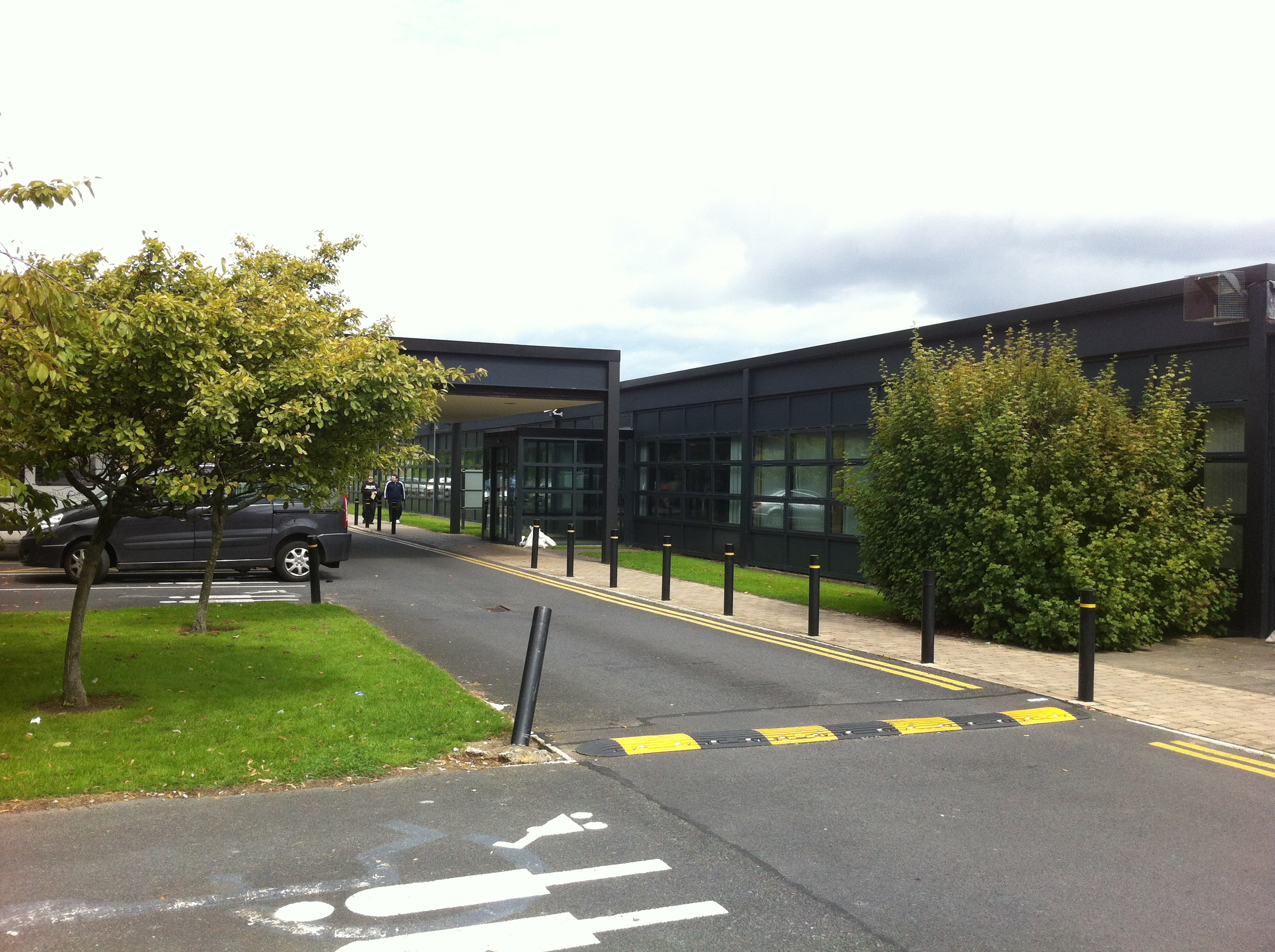
- Central Remedial Clinic

- Shown in Dublin

Geography
- Location: Clontarf, Dublin, Ireland
- Coordinates: 53°22′11″N 6°12′4″W

Organisation
- Type: Specialist

Services
- Speciality: Care for children and adults with physical disabilities

History
- Founded: 1951

Links
- Website: crc.ie
- Lists: Hospitals in the Republic of Ireland

The Central Remedial Clinic (Irish: An Príomhchlinic Feabhais), commonly known and referred to as the CRC, is a non-residential national centre established for the care, treatment and development of children and adults with physical disabilities. It is in Clontarf, Dublin, Ireland, 5 km north-east of the city centre.

== History ==
The clinic was founded by Lady Valerie Goulding and Kathleen O'Rourke in 1951 as a small non-residential treatment centre in a house on Upper Pembroke Street in Dublin's city centre. In 1954, it moved to Goatstown where it quickly developed paramedical and educational services for people with disabilities. In 1968, it moved into a purpose-built facility in Clontarf. In the 1970s, Lady Goulding hired Charles Haughey to head up its fund-raising arm. Accountant to Haughey, Des Peelo, was chairman for a period. While Lady Goulding ensured continuing finance from State and philanthropic sources, its medical development was under the direction of Dr Ciaran Barry, who also worked at the Mater Hospital. The CRC opened a centre in Waterford, providing a regional assessment service for children in the south-east of Ireland, in 2001 and substantially expanded it in 2011.

The CRC is partly funded by the Health Service Executive (HSE) and partly funded by charity and fundraising activities. As of 2010/2011, the CRC was in receipt of approximately €17 million annually from the HSE, with an additional €14 million raised by its charity arm (Friends and Supporters of the Central Remedial Clinic). The latter included several million in National Lottery funding.

== Controversy ==
=== Salary review ===
The CRC was "embroiled in a major scandal" in 2013 when it was revealed that senior staff were receiving salaries much higher than agreed public service pay rates, that donated funds (intended to provide services) were used to pay these salaries, and that the charity had paid its former chief executive a "secret €742,000 retirement pay-off" from charitable funds. These controversies (and similar issues at other Irish charities) during 2014 and 2015 reportedly resulted in an overall reduction in donations to charitable organisations and prompted changes to the regulation of charities in Ireland.

=== Association with Jimmy Savile ===
British television presenter Jimmy Savile was a high-profile fundraiser for the clinic. Revelations about sexual abuse committed by Savile in the UK came to light following his death in 2011. In response, the CRC examined his history with them.
