= Origin Enterprises =

Agri-services group

Origin Enterprises plc
- Company type: Public limited company
- Traded as: Euronext Dublin: OIZ; AIM: OGN; ISEQ 20 component Euronext Growth
- ISIN: IE00B1WV4493
- Industry: Food
- Founded: 2006
- Headquarters: Dublin, Ireland
- Key people: Gary Britton, (Non-Executive Chairman); Sean Coyle, (CEO)
- Products: Food and agribusiness
- Revenue: ▲€2,109.1 (2025)
- Operating income: ▲€86.2 (2025)
- Net income: ▲€52.8 (2025)
- Number of employees: 2,997 (2025)
- Website: www.originenterprises.com

Origin Enterprises plc is a food manufacturing business operating in Ireland, the United Kingdom, Brazil, Poland and Romania. It is listed on the Euronext Growth Dublin market and the AIM market of the London Stock Exchange.

== History ==
Origin was established by the IAWS Group in 2006 to focus on the original agribusiness and food and nutrition businesses of IAWS: it was admitted to the IEX and AIM on 5 June 2007.

In October 2013 it bought 60% of Agroscope, a Ukrainian business, for $17.6m.

In September 2015 it completed the acquisition of Romania's Redoxim. Then in November 2015, it completed the acquisition of Kazgod group in Poland and in December 2015, it completed the acquisition of Comfert S.R.L. in Romania.

In June 2018, it announced an agreement to expand its footprint within South America, buying a sharehold part of two Brazilian companies, by €50.3m.

== Operations ==
Agri-services businesses include:

- R&H Hall
- Goulding
- Agrii
- Origin Digital
- Origin Soil Nutrition
- PB Kent
- Origin Amenity Solutions
- Agrii Polska (Poland)
- Agrii Romania
- Agrigem
