= Barrie Cooke =

English-born Irish expressionest painter

Barrie C. Cooke (1931 – 4 March 2014) was an English-born Irish abstract expressionist painter.

Cooke was born in Knutsford, to an English father and an American mother, and spent part of his childhood in Jamaica and Bermuda, before moving to the U.S. in 1947, where he studied art history at Harvard University. He moved to Ireland in 1954, and in 1955 went to Salzburg to study under Austrian artist Oskar Kokoschka. His work is represented in such collections as the Irish Museum of Modern Art, the Ulster Museum, the Stedelijk Museum (Amsterdam), the Haags Gemeentemuseum (The Hague), and other public and private collections worldwide.

He was a friend and collaborator of both Ted Hughes and Seamus Heaney, illustrating Hughes's "The Great Irish Pike" (1982) and Heaney's Bog Poems (1975).

The Barrie Cooke archive which contains letters and poems from friends, including Heaney and Hughes is at Pembroke College, Cambridge.

He died in 2014 in Leighlinbridge, County Carlow, Ireland.

== Collections ==
- Stedelijk Museum, Amsterdam
- The Irish Museum of Modern Art, Dublin
- Birmingham Museums & Art Gallery, Birmingham
- Dublin City University: Couple 2
