= Imogen Stuart =

Irish sculptor (1927–2024)

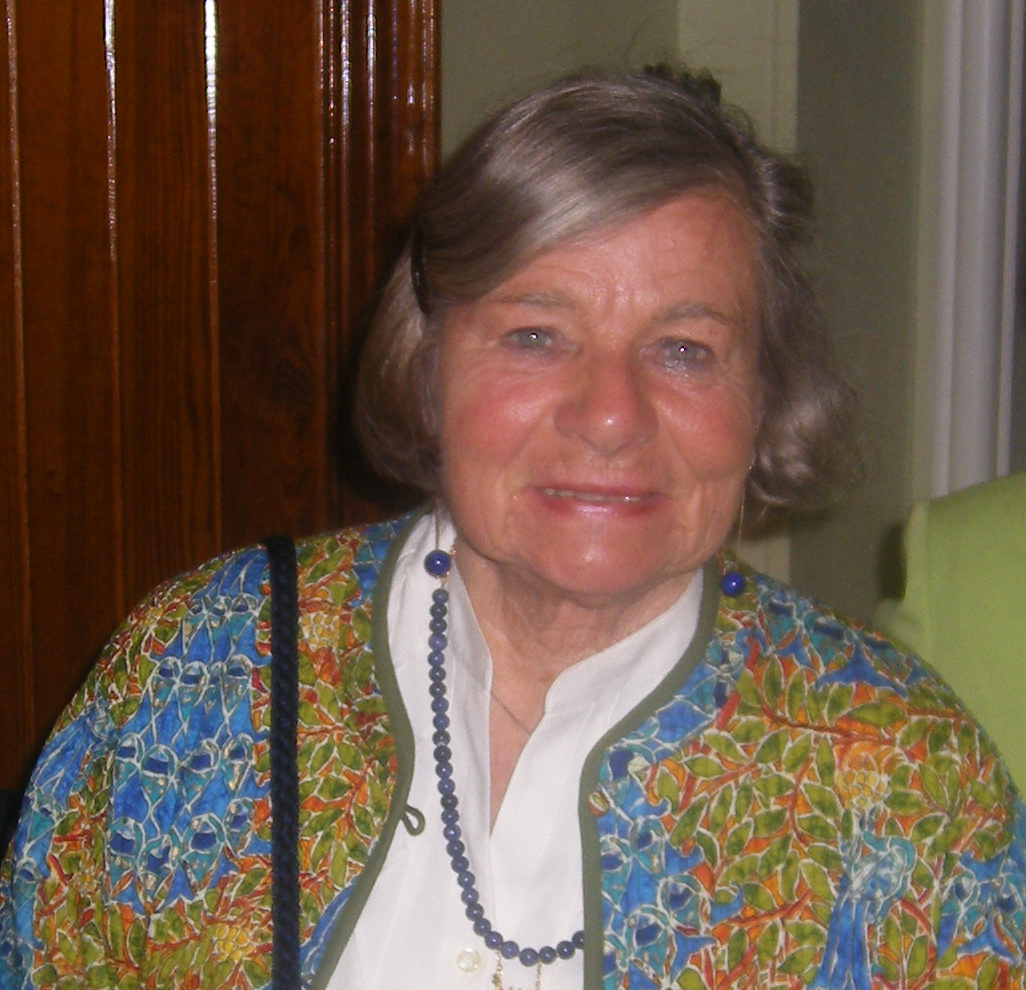
- Imogen Stuart in 2011
- Born: Imogen Werner; 25 May 1927; Berlin, Germany
- Died: 24 March 2024 (aged 96); Dublin, Ireland
- Occupation: Sculptor
- Notable work: Stations of the Cross, wood, 1957, The Curragh; Main Doors and Reliefs 1963–4, Galway Cathedral; Altar carvings, Honan Chapel, 1988; Penal Cross, wood, 1988, Lough Derg; Monument to Pope John Paul II, late 1980s; Portrait bust of Sean McBride, bronze, 1990; President Mary Robinson, bronze, 1998
- Spouse: Ian Stuart (div. 1973)
- Parent: Bruno E. Werner
- Website: www.imogenstuart.com

Imogen Stuart (née Werner; 25 May 1927 – 24 March 2024) was a German-Irish sculptor, influenced by Expressionism and early Irish Christian art. She mainly produced wood and stone for settings for churches but also created many secular works, and was exhibited internationally.

Born and raised in pre-war Berlin as the daughter of the art critic Bruno E. Werner, she was exposed from an early age to modern developments in the visual arts, which had a significant influence on her later work. She studied in Bavaria under the sculptor and professor Otto Hitzberger, who became her main mentor. She met fellow Hitzberger student and Irish sculptor Ian Stuart while in Bavaria in 1948. The couple moved to Ireland in 1949, at first living at his parents' house in Glendalough, County Wicklow, before moving to Sandycove, County Dublin. Ian Stuart was the grandson of the Irish republican revolutionary Maud Gonne. The couple married in 1951, had three daughters but separated in 1970 and divorced later.

During her long career, Imogen became one of Ireland's most renowned sculptors, with her work placed in both public spaces and private collections throughout Europe and the U.S.

== Life ==
=== Early life ===
Born Imogen Werner in Berlin in 1927, she was the daughter of Katharina (née Kluger), a former art history student originally from Upper Silesia (now part of Poland), and the influential and internationally known art critic and writer Bruno E. Werner (1896–1964), one of Germany's leading art critics and an editor for the Deutsche Allgemeine Zeitung newspaper, who championed the Bauhaus movement. Imogen and her only sibling, Sibylle, spent their childhoods in pre-war 1920s Berlin. Encouraged by their father, both developed an interest in drawing and sculpting at a young age. They were taught the techniques of arts and crafts and sculpture by friends of their father. By early 1945, when the Russian army was advancing towards Berlin, Imogen's "golden childhood came to an end" and both daughters were moved to a convent in Bavaria, while their father went into hiding from the Nazis. He was in Dresden, where he had grown up, during the February 1945 bombing of the city. He recounted the experience in his best-selling 1949 book Die Galeere.

In Munich, she studied under the sculptor and professor Otto Hitzberger, a retired professor for the Berlin University of the Arts, who taught her modelling, carving and relief techniques across a variety of materials. He became her mentor and she later described him as her most important influence.

There, in 1948 she met her future husband, the Irishman Ian Stuart (1926–2013). He had also studied under Hitzberger and is often referred to as the "finest Irish sculptor" of his generation.

=== Move to Ireland ===
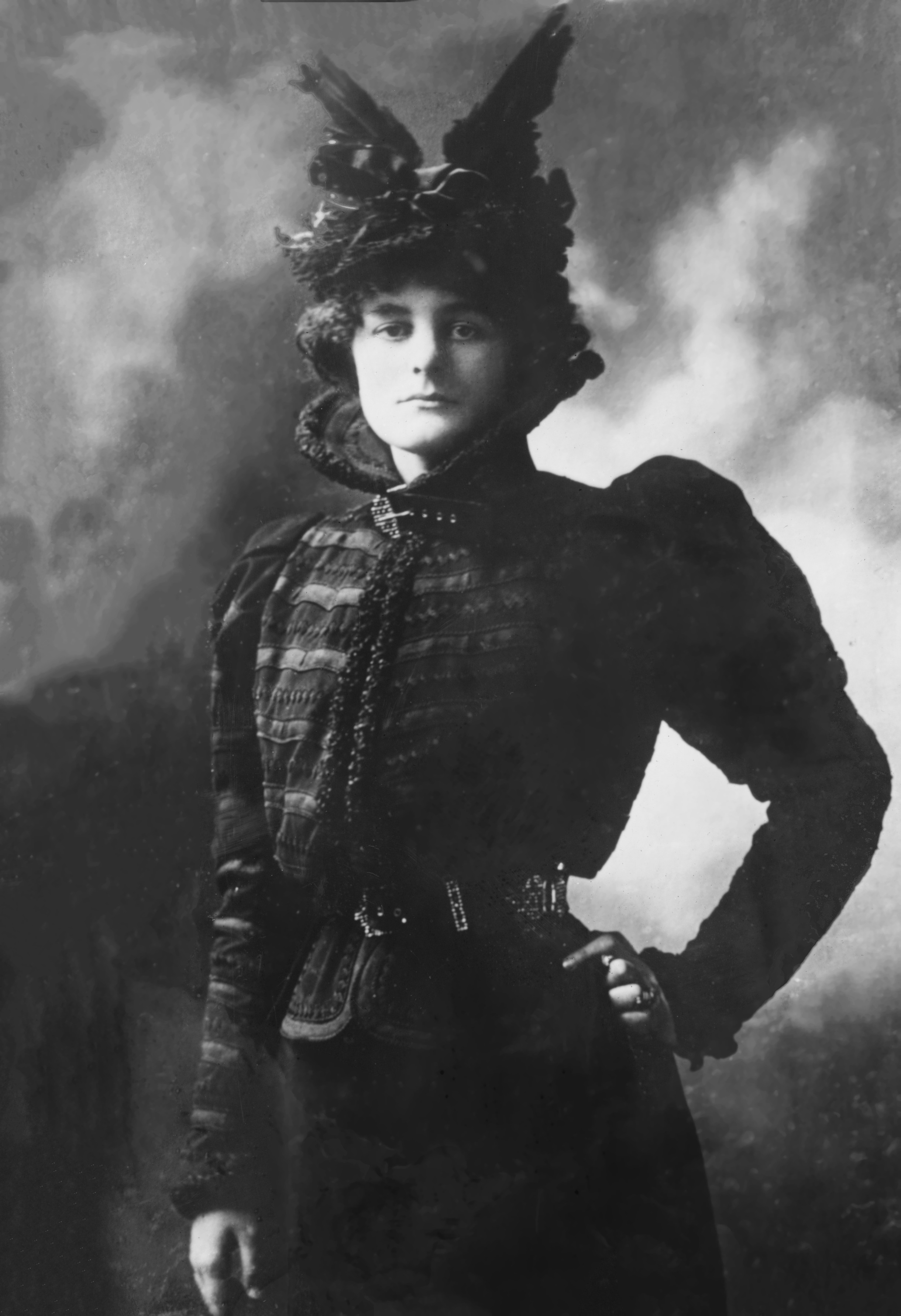
Maud Gonne (b. 1866)

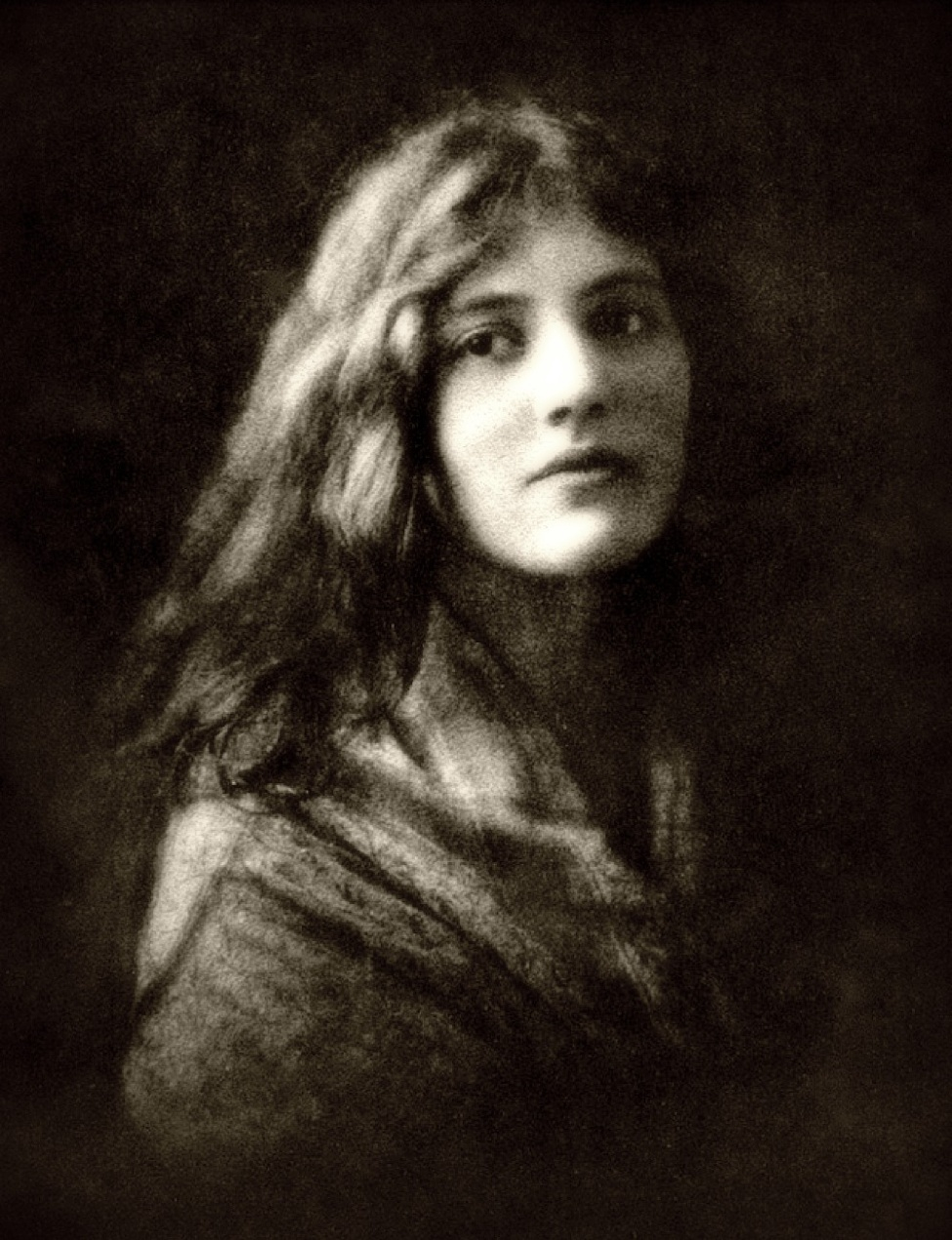
Iseult Gonne (b. 1894)

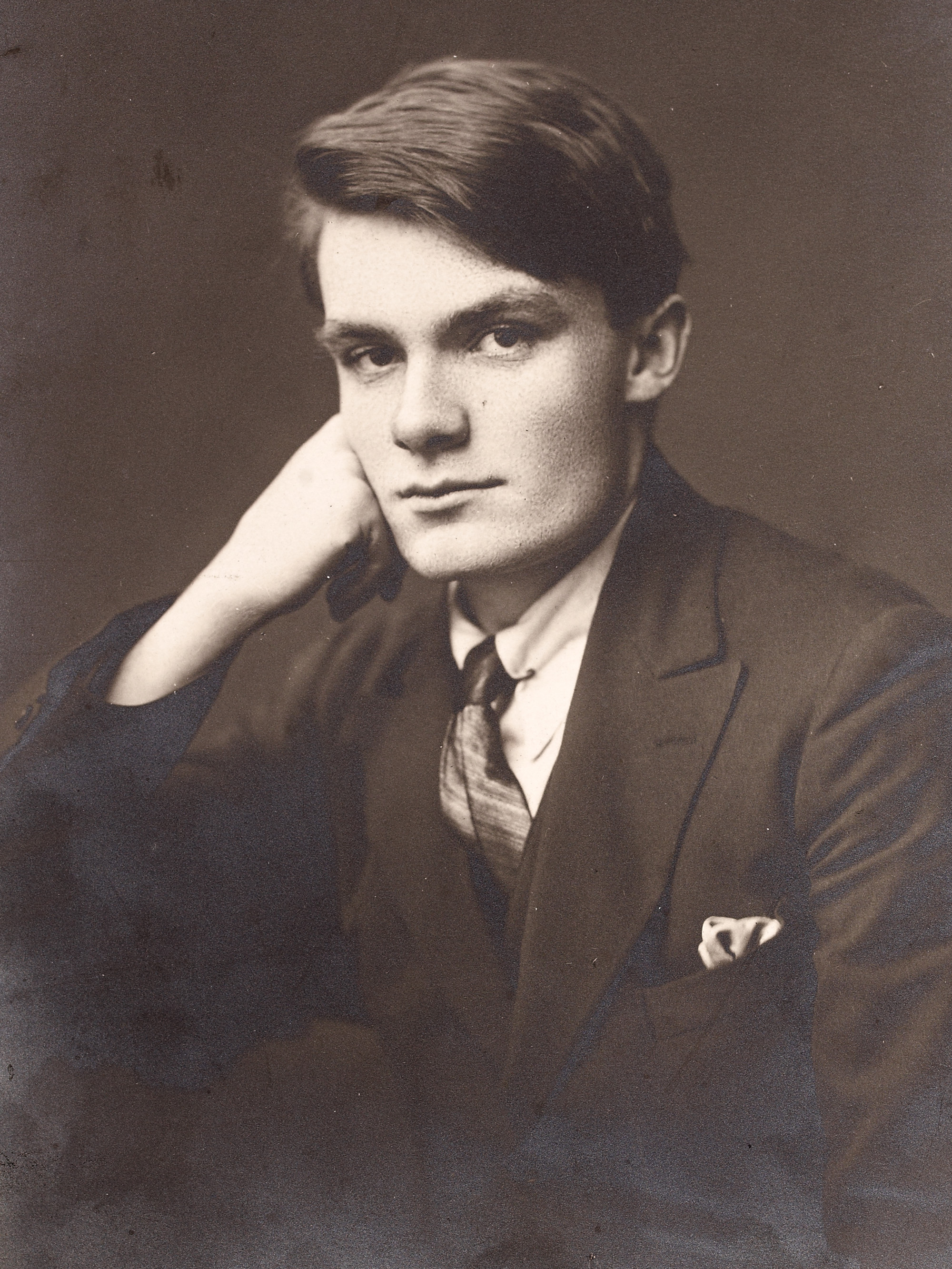
Francis Stuart (b. 1902)

They became inseparable during their early relationship, when Stuart would sing Irish rebel songs to her. The couple first visited Ireland in 1949 and moved permanently there that year, at first living in with his parents at Laragh Castle near Glendalough, County Wicklow, into what the writer Kate Robinson described as a family containing a "notable mixture of politics and literature". Ian's mother Iseult Gonne was married to the writer Francis Stuart and was the daughter of Maud Gonne, the Irish revolutionary and feminist, known internationally as W. B. Yeats's muse. She was not intimidated by his family, being a highly educated and skilled artist in her own right. By coincidence, Iseult was a friend of the German diplomat Eduard Hempel, a former German Minister to Ireland who was a friend of Imogen's father.

Imogen said of her relocation to Ireland: "It is very hard to describe how different this country was from the country from which I had come. It was a totally different world, on a different planet. The Catholicism, the nationalism, the magical countryside, made it all seem like going back a hundred years." They had three daughters: Aoibheann, Siobhan and Aisling. Siobhan died in a car crash in September 1998 and is buried in Glendalough.

Both were preoccupied with religious sculpture in wood and stone throughout their careers. They held a number of joint exhibitions, notably in 1959 at the Dawson gallery, Dublin, while they both exhibited at the 1962 Biennale in Salzburg, Austria. Although she became somewhat overshadowed by her husband during this early period, during which she held only a few one-woman shows.

=== Commissions ===
In the 1970s the Church began to seek a revival of religious art, led by a number of progressive leaders who recognised that the Church had under-invested in this aspect for centuries, with Imogen becoming a favourite of many church leaders; notably, she was given the newly created title "Artist in Charge" of the redesign of a number of churches, meaning she was given responsibility for hiring other artists, as well as architects, craftsmen and masons. This led to the careers of several notable Irish visual artists, including the stained glass designer Harry Clarke (b. 1889).

=== Later life ===
From 1949 on, Stuart spent her life in Ireland. She died aged 96 on 24 March 2024, having been actively working until near the end of her life.

== Style and material ==
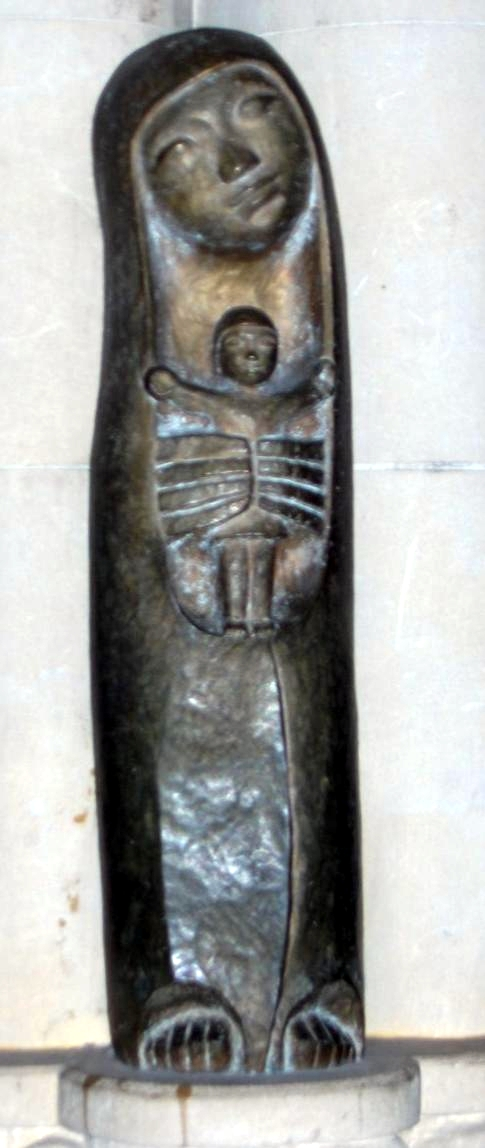
The Virgin and Child (1991), on display at Christ Church Cathedral, Dublin

Stuart's work is informed by German expressionist sculptors such as Ernst Barlach, but in a sensibility also influenced by the later Romanesque and Gothic art periods. She primarily carved wood, but also worked from bronze, stone, steel, clay and terracotta.

Her first impression of Ireland in the late 1950s was of a country lacking a distinct visual culture, which she then sought to establish. Her work often combines modern European trends in modern art with styles and motifs from early medieval Irish illuminated manuscripts and Insular metalwork. It has been described as having a deep foundation in Christian spirituality, but in "its deceptive simplicity" is both modern and devotional.

She also produced collections of silver, gold and bronze jewellery and a series of drawings.

== Work ==
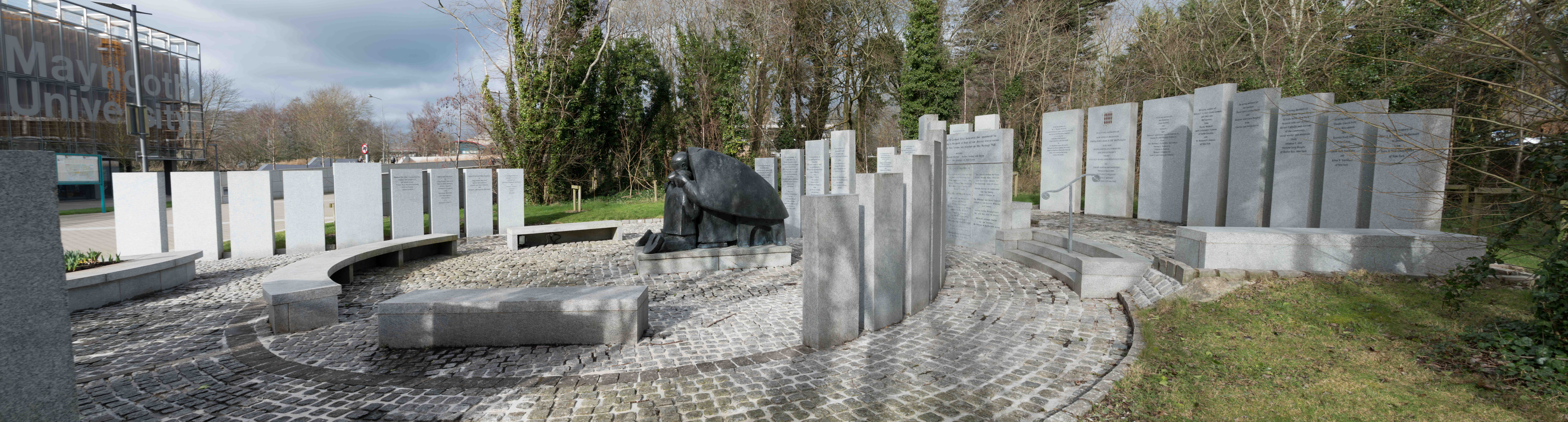
The heritage wall, Maynooth

She became a prolific sculptor for both Roman Catholic and Church of Ireland church interiors. Well-known examples include the altarpieces and baptismal font in the Honan Chapel, in Cork City.

"Within the sharply defined limits of material, subject, space, size and money given, I learned to develop within myself a great freedom of expression. My life is full of gifts or minor miracles. I never intellectualise – the eyes and senses dictate my hands directly. Once the work has been completed, a symbolism becomes so obviously and profoundly evident that I have to regard it as supernatural."

— Imogen Stuart

Her work also includes public art and monuments and portrait heads, including a bust of ex-president Mary Robinson now in Áras an Uachtaráin (the presidential residence in Dublin), and a Bust of the art critic Brian Fallon. Her public sculptures include the monumental sculpture of Pope John Paul II in St. Patrick's College, Maynooth, the 2005 Flame Of Human Dignity at the Centre Culturel Irlandais, Paris,

Her 1969 Statue of Saint Brendan was created with Ian Stuart and is positioned in the town square in Bantry, County Cork.

She worked with architects, designers and metalsmiths throughout her career, including with Vicki Donovan, Phil O'Neill and Ciaran Byrne. With Donovan she produced the silver tabernacle in St. Mel's Cathedral, Longford.

== Legacy ==
A professor of sculpture at the Royal Hibernian Academy, Dublin, she was also a member of Aosdána, and received honorary doctorates from Trinity College Dublin (2002), University College Dublin (2004), and NUI Maynooth (2005). She was elected Saoi ("wise one") by Aosdána in 2015 as the highest honour that can be bestowed by the state-supported association of Irish creative artists.

In 2010 she was awarded the McAuley medal (named after Catherine McAuley, founder of the Sisters of Mercy in 1831) by the Irish president Mary McAleese, who paid tribute to her "genius", crafting "a canon of work that synthesises our complex past, present images and possible futures...as an intrinsic part of the narrative of modern Irish art". The biography Imogen Stuart, Sculptor on her work and life was published in 2002 by the art critic and writer Brian Fallon, and included a foreword by the archaeologist and historian Peter Harbison.

== Gallery ==
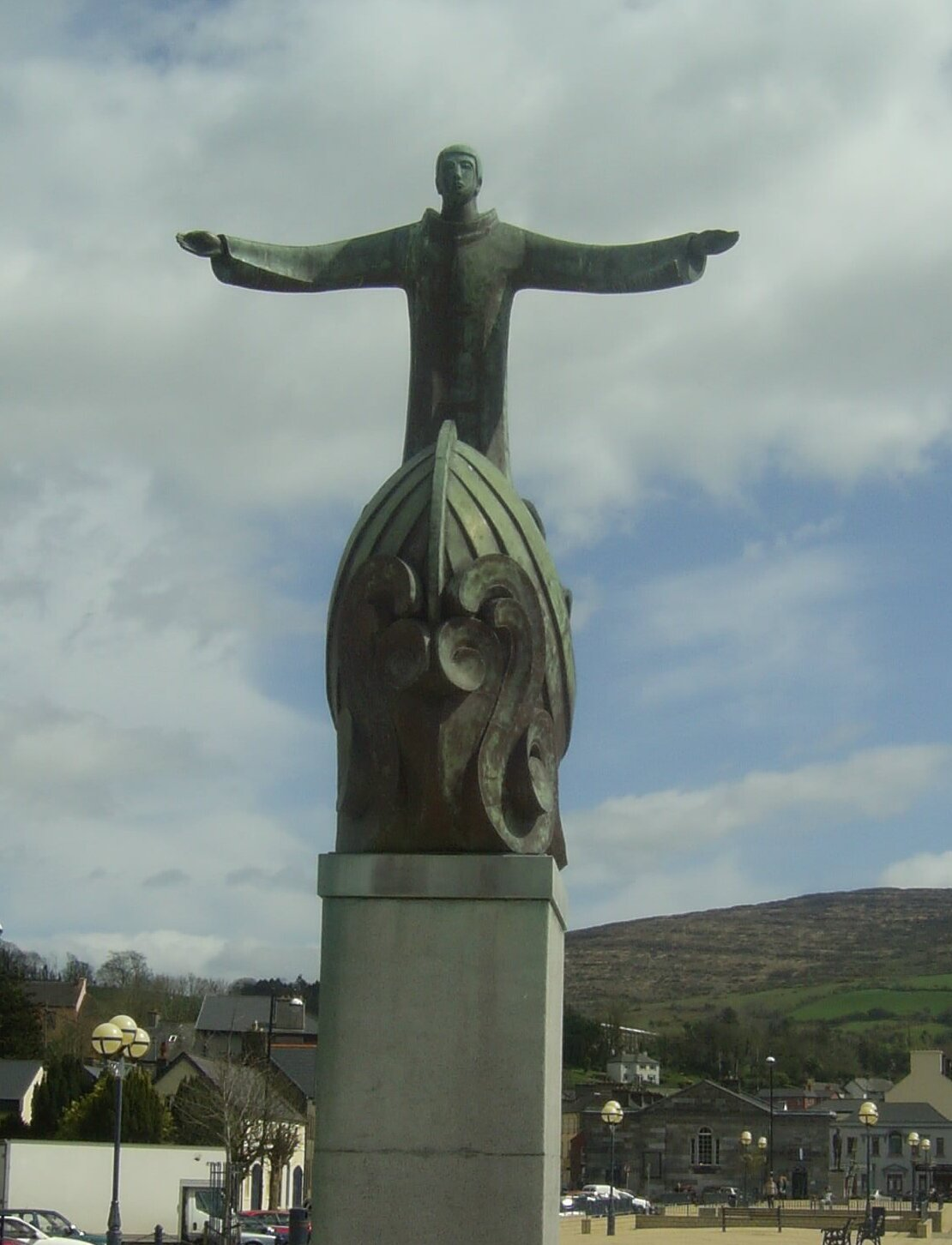
Statue of Saint Brendan, with Ian Stuart, Bantry, County Cork, 1969

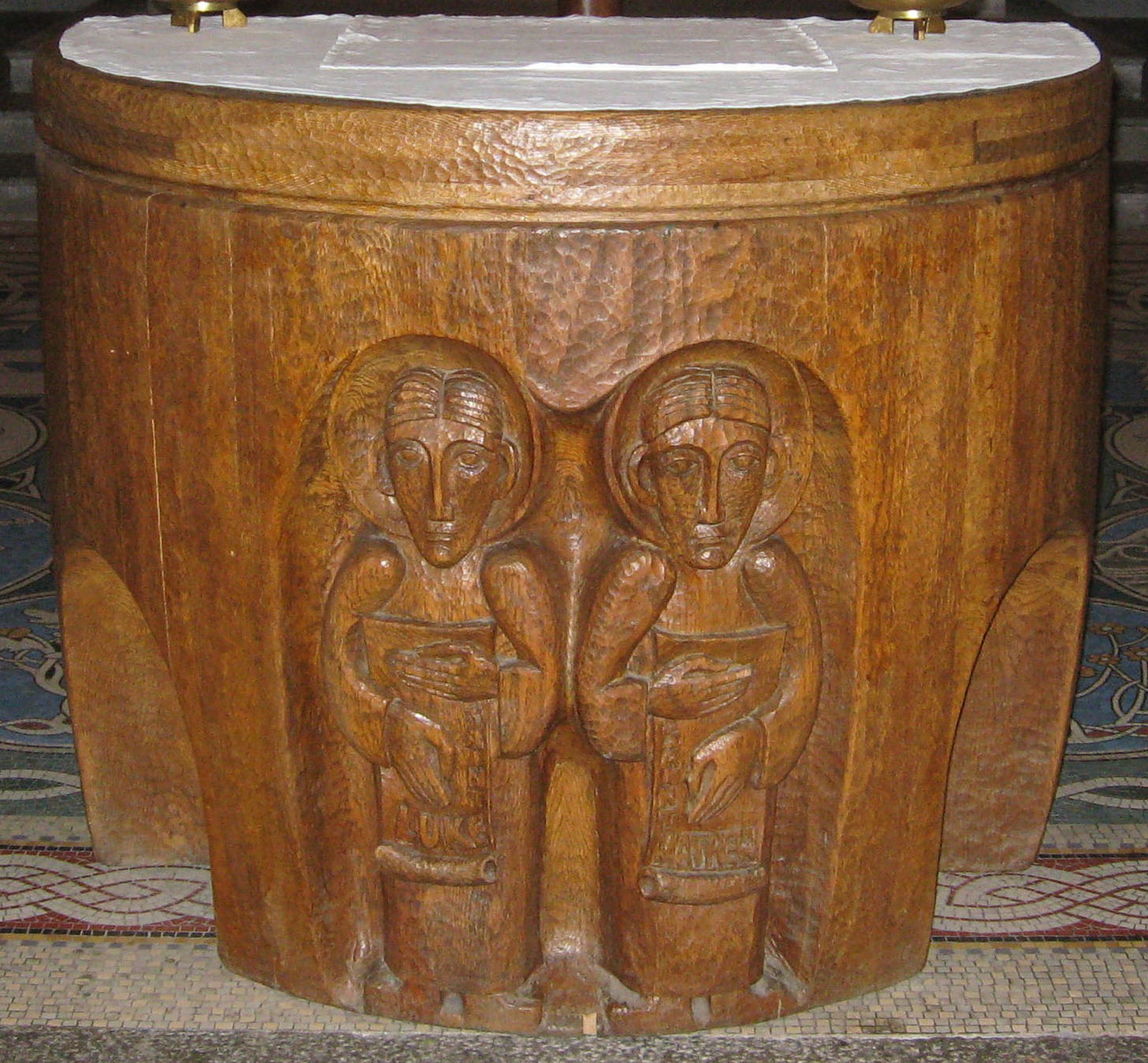
The altar in the Honan Chapel, Cork, c. 1986

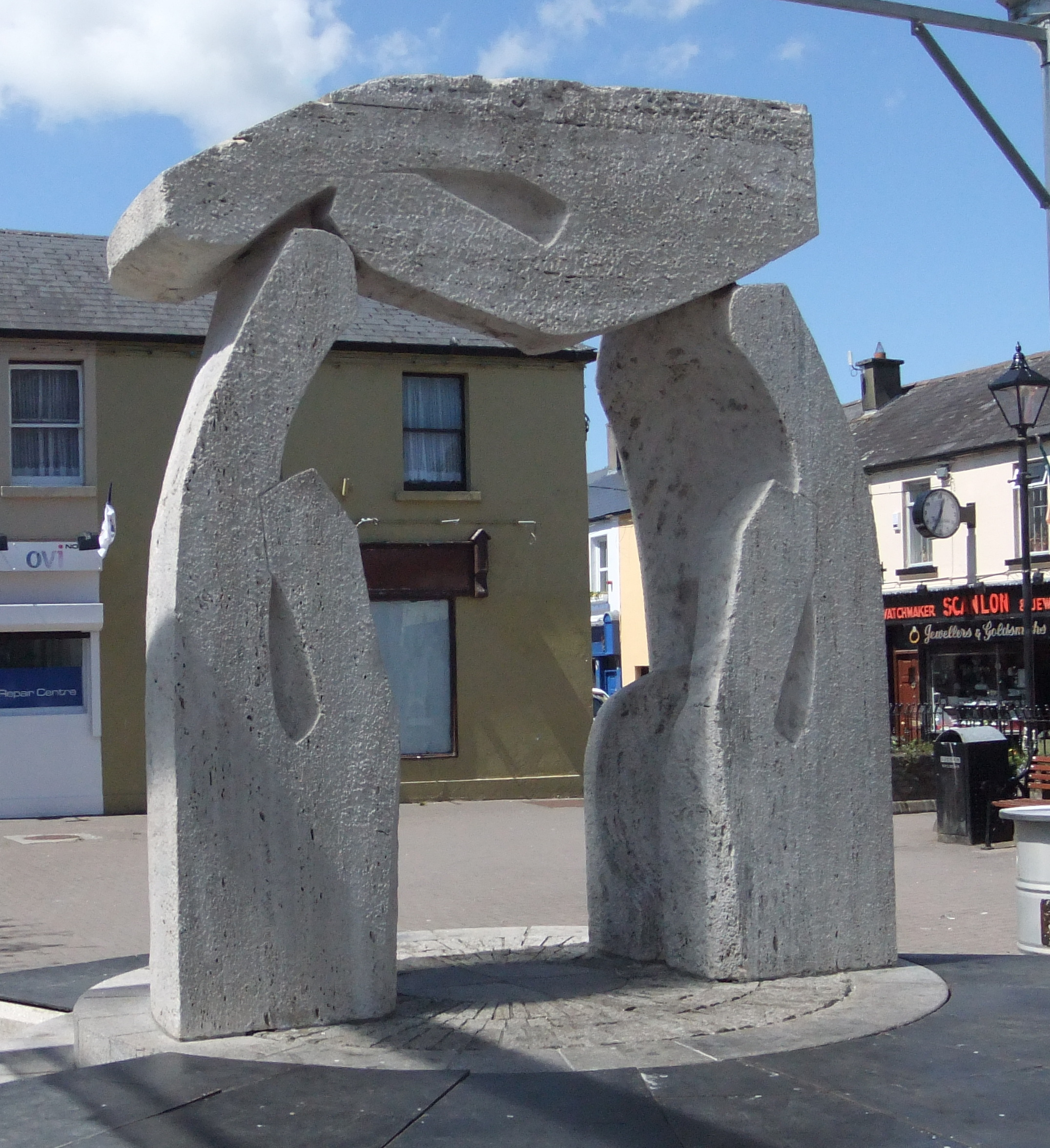
The Hands of Peace, 1989. Market Square, Cavan town. Many of Stuart's later works combine imagery of dolmens and praying hands.

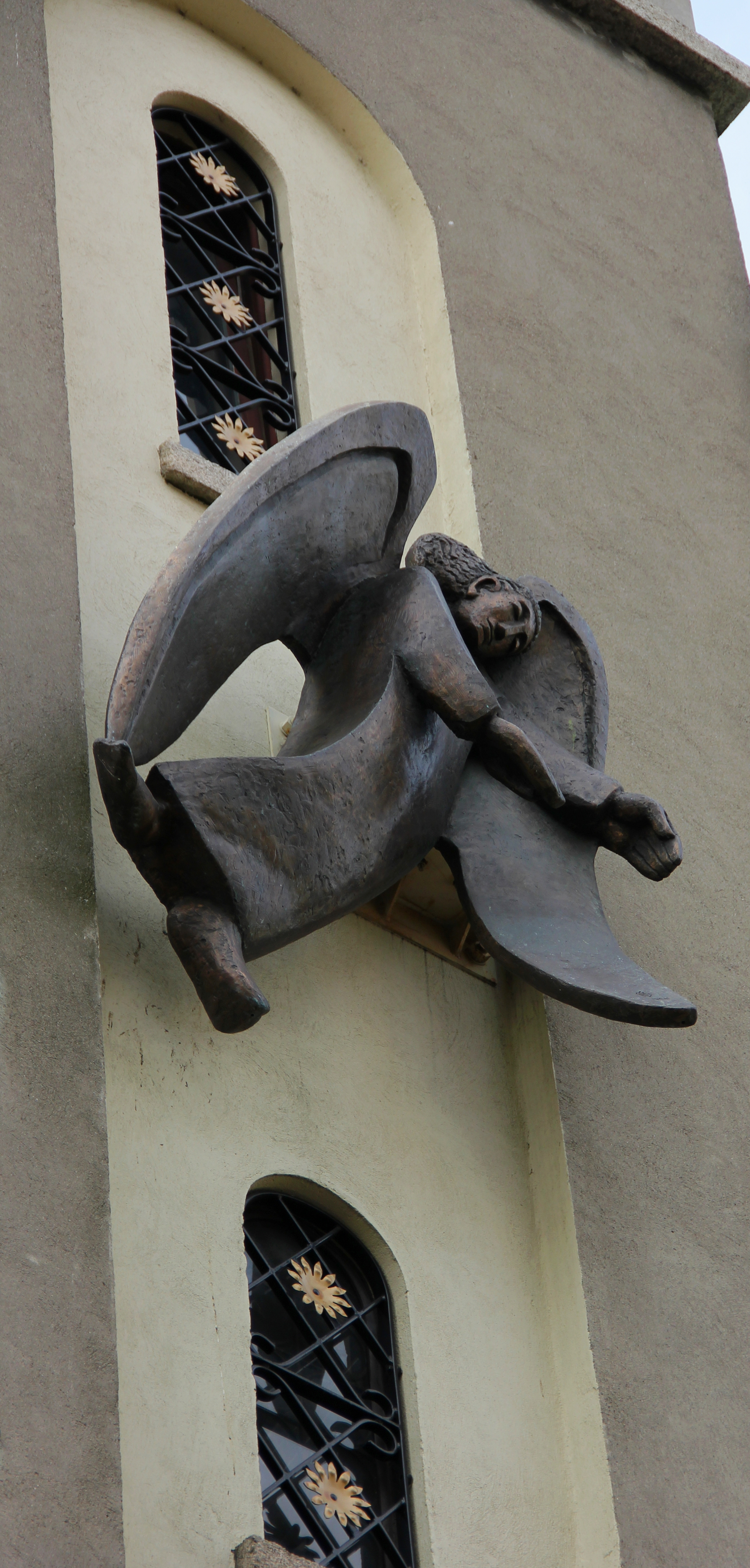
Angel of Peace, bronze, 2008. St. Teresa's Carmelite Church, Dublin.

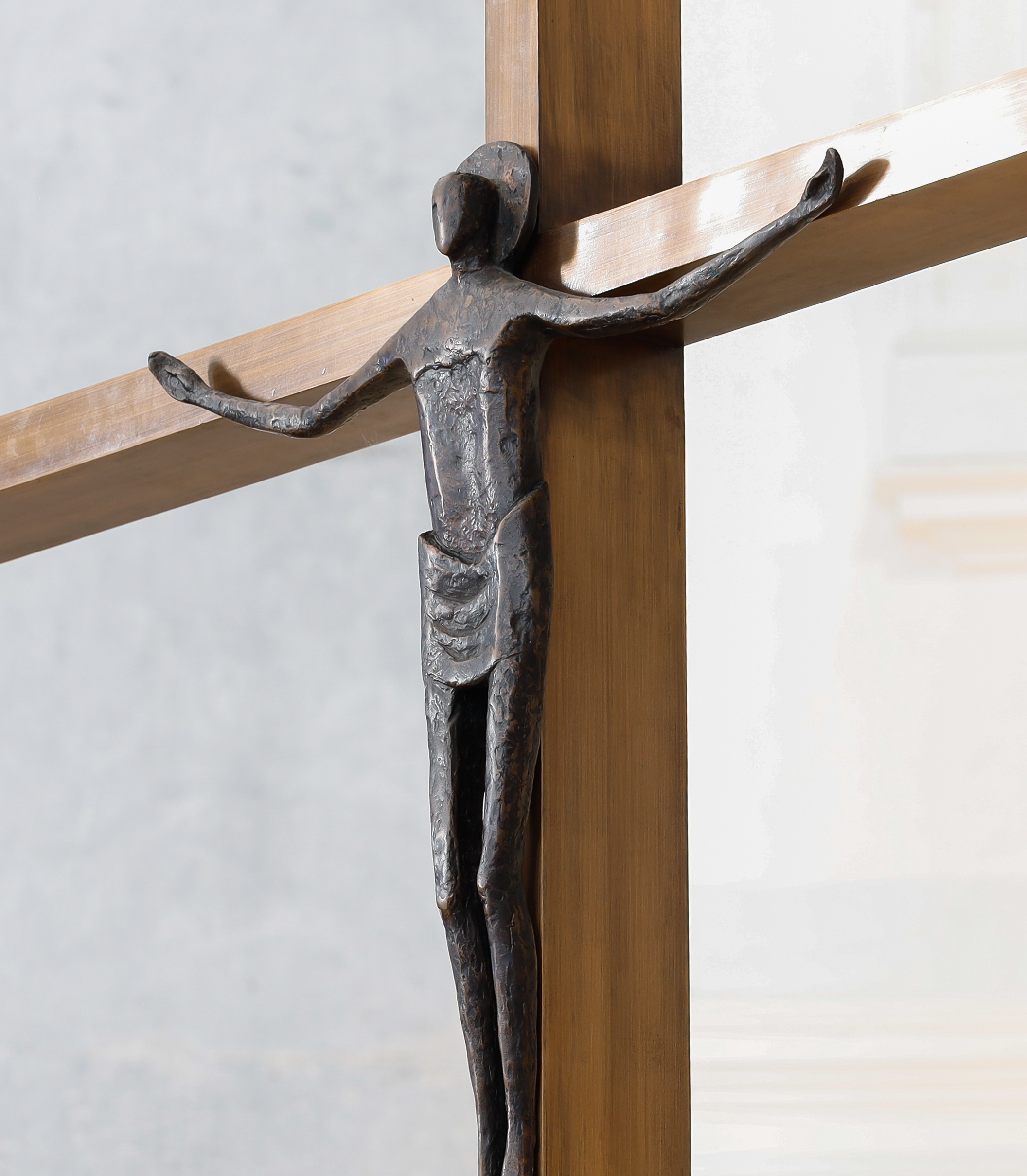
Sanctuary cross, cast bronze, with Vicki Donovan, St Mel's Cathedral, County Longford

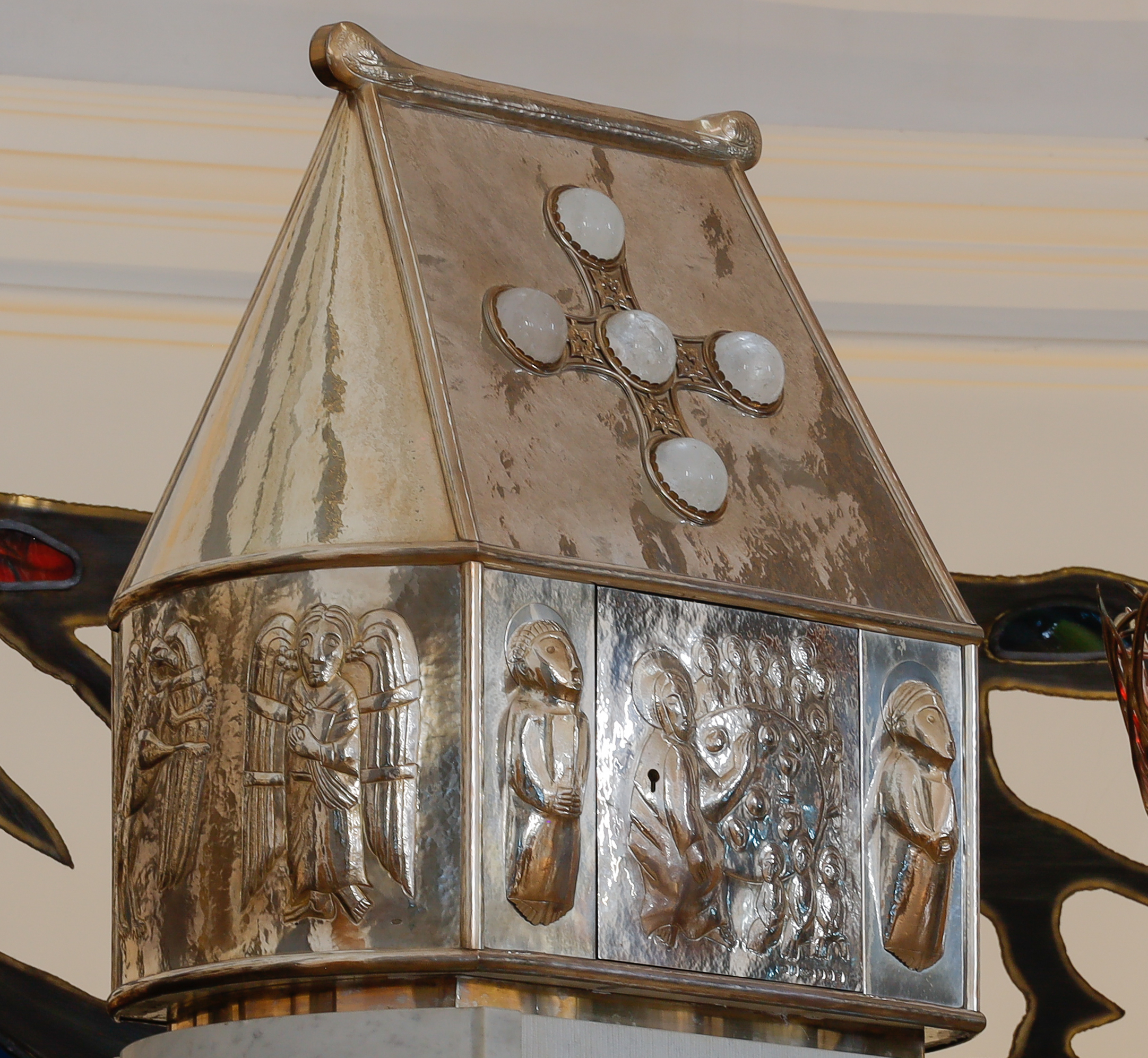
Tabernacle, St. Mel's Cathedral, Longford. This work evokes the early medieval format of a House-shaped shrine, with the upper portion directly referencing the 12th century Saint Manchan's Shrine.

== Sources ==
- Daly, Caughal (November 1974). "Sacred Art in the Home". The Furrow. 25 (11). JSTOR 27680060.
- Fallon, Brian (2022). Imogen Stuart —In Her Hands Exhibition Catalogue. Dublin: Mary Immaculate College. ISBN 978-1-9001-4638-8.
- Fallon, Brian (2001). Imogen Stuart, Sculptor. Dublin: Four Courts. ISBN 978-1-8518-2666-7.
- Forristal, Desmond (October 1987). "The Pope John Paul Sculpture at Maynooth". The Furrow. 38 (10): 648–651. JSTOR 27678571.
- Heaney, Steven (25 March 2024). "President Higgins leads tributes to acclaimed sculptor Imogen Stuart after her death aged 96". The Irish Examiner.
- Maertz, Gregory (2019). Nostalgia for the Future: Modernism and Heterogeneity in the Visual Arts of Nazi Germany. Dublin: ibidem Press. ISBN 978-3-8382-1281-4.
- McBride, Stephanie (Summer 2008). "From shadow to light". Irish Arts Review. 25 (2).
- McGarry, Patsy (2 January 2008). "Archbishop blesses 'Angel of Peace'". The Irish Times. Archived from the original on 26 March 2024.
- McDonagh, Marese (20 December 2014). "Mass to be celebrated in St Mel's for first time since 2009 fire". Archived from the original on 25 March 2024.
- O'Callaghan, Antóin (2016). The Churches of Cork City. Dublin: The History Press Ireland. ISBN 978-1-845-88893-0.
- Robinson, Kate (2002). "Imogen Stuart, Sculptor, Church Designer". Studies: An Irish Quarterly Review. 91 (363): 215–222. JSTOR 30095554.
- Scally, Derek (25 March 2024). "Prolific Irish-German sculptor Imogen Stuart dies aged 96". The Irish Times. Archived from the original on 26 March 2024.
- Scally, Derek (4 September 2010). "President honours 'genius' of Imogen Stuart". The Irish Times. Archived from the original on 4 February 2019.
- Scally, Derek (14 February 2005). "City in flames: the bombing of Dresden". The Irish Times. Archived from the original on 30 March 2024.
- Teehan, Virginia; Heckett, Elizabeth (2005). The Honan Chapel: A Golden Vision. Cork: Cork University Press. ISBN 978-1-8591-8346-5.
- Walker, Dorothy (1989). "Bronze by Gold, the Work of Irish Women Sculptors". Irish Arts Review: The GPA Irish Arts Review Yearbook: 207–213. JSTOR 20492121.
