= Mary Barry O'Delaney =

Irish journalist and nationalist

- Born: Mary Barry Delany; 1862
- Died: 1947 (aged 84–85); Roebuck House, Clonskeagh, County Dublin

Mary Barry O'Delaney (born Mary Barry Delany; 1862–1947) was an Irish journalist and nationalist.

== Life ==
Mary Barry O'Delaney was born Mary Barry Delany in 1862, adopting O'Delaney when she became a journalist. She left Ireland for Paris in 1883, making a living through her journalism, primarily religious in subject as she was a devout Catholic. All her life O'Delaney also wrote stories, including ghost stories, and poetry for newspapers. By the 1890s she was working for the Daily Irish Independent as the Paris correspondent. It was around this time that O'Delaney became friends with Maud Gonne, comparing her to Joan of Arc and hailing her as "our island's maiden queen" in a poem published in February 1898.

Gonne and O'Delaney worked together for the rest of her life, as Gonne's researcher and companion, with a brief split in March 1899 following a quarrel after which Gonne wondered if O'Delaney was insane. Upon the foundation of the Paris Young Ireland Society in 1897, O'Delaney became its secretary. In this position she circulated reports of its work to Irish papers, whilst also being Gonne's assistant editor to the French language nationalist newspaper, L'Irlande Libre. O'Delaney suggested a special number of L'Irlande Libre to mark Queen Victoria's Irish visit in 1900, in which she was blamed for the Irish famine and other Irish misfortunes. The issue was banned by Dublin Castle authorities in Ireland.

After the breakup of Gonne's marriage to John MacBride, O'Delaney lived with Gonne, helping her to raise her children. An incident in which McBride had exposed himself to O'Delaney when drunk was one of a number of such events that had led to the ending of the marriage. O'Delaney had a close relationship with Gonne's son, Seán MacBride, who she called her "glory boy". Upon his birth in 1904, O'Delaney had sent a telegram to Pope Pius X that the future King of Ireland had been born. She was not as close to Gonne's daughter, Iseult, who was irritated by her religious fervour. She acted as W. B. Yeats' secretary when he visited France. When Gonne returned to Ireland in 1918, O'Delaney went with her, looking after her affairs while Gonne was imprisoned. During the Irish War of Independence, O'Delaney's knee was shattered by a bullet.

O'Delaney stood as godmother to Francis Stuart when he converted to Catholicism in advance of his marriage to Iseult. In later life, she lived at the Gonne–MacBride residence, Roebuck House, Clonskeagh, County Dublin. She and Gonne continued their collaboration on political activities until her death in 1947. She signed her writings as "MD", "MB" and "M.O'D." as well as a number of pen names such as "Joseph May".
