= Bruno E. Werner =

Bruno Erich Werner (5 September 1896, Leipzig – 21 January 1964, Davos) was a German philologist, publicist, writer, critic and diplomat. As the editor-in-chief of arts at the Deutsche Allgemeine Zeitung, he became one of the most important art critics in pre-war Germany. Werner's taste in art and architecture was influenced by the Modernist and Bauhaus movements and he was later keenly interested in Expressionism.

He married Katharina Kluger (born in Silesia) whom he met while studying art history under Heinrich Wölfflin. The couple moved to Berlin, where they had two daughters, Imogen (b. 1927) and Sybile, both of whom went on to be artists.

Around the time that the Russian army was advancing towards Berlin in early 1945, Werner hid his daughters to a convent in Bavaria and went into hiding from the Nazis. He recounted his wartime experiences in his 1949 book Die Galeere.

== Sources ==
- Brooker, Peter; Thacker, Andrew. The Oxford Critical and Cultural History of Modernist Magazines. Oxford: Offord University Press, 2009. ISBN 978-0-1996-5958-6
- Robinson, Kate (2002). "Imogen Stuart, Sculptor, Church Designer". Studies: An Irish Quarterly Review. 91 (363): 215–222. JSTOR 30095554.
- Scally, Derek (14 February 2005). "City in flames: the bombing of Dresden". The Irish Times.
