= Iseult Gonne =

Irish poet

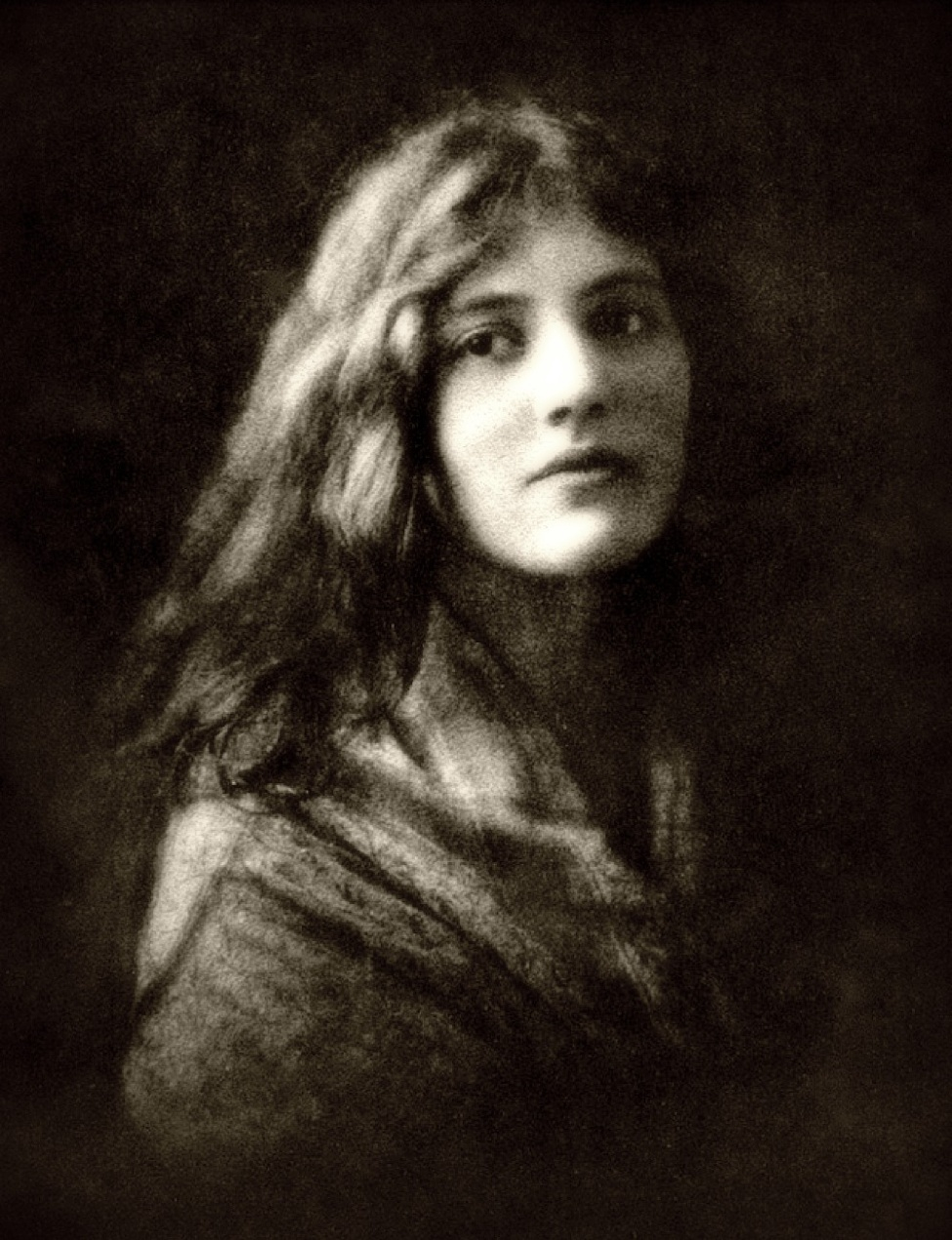
- Gonne c.1910
- Born: Iseult Lucille Germaine Gonne; 6 August 1894; France
- Died: 22 March 1954 (aged 59)
- Occupation: Poet
- Spouse: Francis Stuart
- Parents: Lucien Millevoye (father); Maud Gonne (mother)
- Relatives: Seán MacBride (half-brother); Imogen Stuart (daughter-in-law)

Iseult Lucille Germaine Gonne (6 August 1894 – 22 March 1954) was the daughter of the Irish republican revolutionary Maud Gonne and the French politician and journalist Lucien Millevoye. She married the novelist Francis Stuart in 1920.

== Life ==
Iseult's mother Maud Gonne had conceived a child, Georges, with her French Boulangist lover, the prominent anti Dreyfusard journalist and politician Lucien Millevoye. When the baby died, possibly by meningitis, Gonne was distraught, and buried him in a large memorial chapel built for him with money she had inherited. Gonne separated from Millevoye after Georges' death, but in late 1893, she arranged to meet him at the mausoleum in Samois-sur-Seine and, according to a later claim by William Butler Yeats, next to the coffin, they had sex. Her alleged purpose was to conceive a baby with the same father, to whom the soul of Georges would transmigrate in metempsychosis. Iseult was born as a result on 6 August 1894. Iseult was educated at a Carmelite convent in Laval, France; when she returned to Ireland she was referred to as Maud's niece or cousin rather than daughter.

In 1903, Maud Gonne married John MacBride; Iseult's half-brother Seán MacBride was born in 1904. The couple separated in 1905. With Gonne fearing that Sean's father would seize him from her, her family mostly lived in France until John MacBride's death in the 1916 Easter Rising. In a separation settlement, MacBride was granted a month's summer custody, however, he returned to Ireland and never saw his child again. Iseult's relationship with her stepfather was tainted by an allegation by Yeats, who wrote to Lady Gregory in January 1905 (the month MacBride and Maud separated) that he had been told MacBride had molested Iseult, who at that time was ten years old. However, many critics have suggested that Yeats may have fabricated the event due to his hatred of MacBride over Maud's rejection of him in favour of MacBride. The divorce papers submitted by Gonne made no mention of any such incident – the only charge against MacBride that was substantiated in court was that he was drunk on one occasion during the marriage and Iseult's own writings make no mention of the allegation.

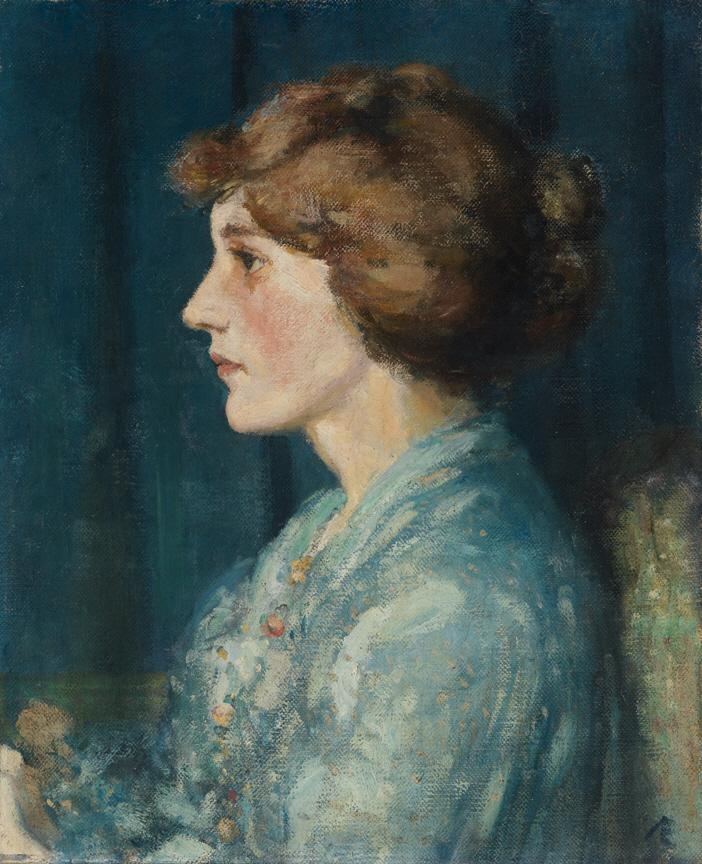
Portrait by George William Russell

In 1913, Iseult met Rabindranath Tagore. Inspired by his poetry, she began to learn Bengali in 1914, tutored by Devabrata Mukerjea. Together, in France, they translated some of Tagore's The Gardener into French directly from the Bengali. Tagore left it to Yeats' discretion to decide the merit of the work, but Yeats did not feel sufficiently fluent in French to judge them. The translations were never published. Iseult was widely considered a great beauty, and temperate, able to speak her mind. She attracted the admiration of literary figures including Ezra Pound, Lennox Robinson and Liam O'Flaherty. Her most infamous association was with Yeats, who had long been in love with her mother. In 1916, in his fifties, Yeats proposed to the 22-year-old Iseult, who refused his advances. He had known her since she was four and often referred to her as his darling child. Many Dubliners suspected that Yeats was her father.

In 1920, she eloped to London with 17-year-old Irish-Australian Francis Stuart, who became a writer, and the couple later married. Their first child, Dolores, died in 1921 of spinal meningitis at three months old. The couple had two other children, Ian and Catherine.

Iseult made headlines during the Second World War when she was brought to trial for harboring Hermann Görtz, a Nazi spy who parachuted into Ireland, a crime to which she confessed but was acquitted.

== Death ==
Maud died in 1953 and did not acknowledge Iseult in her will, possibly due to pressure from Seán who did not want to reveal Maud's relation to Millevoye. Iseult died aged 59 from heart disease less than a year later.

== Sources ==
- Letters to W.B. Yeats and Ezra Pound from Iseult Gonne: A Girl That Knew All Dante Once; Palgrave Macmillan, 2004; ISBN 1-4039-2134-2, ISBN 978-1-4039-2134-5
- French, Amanda. " 'A Strangely Useless Thing': Iseult Gonne and Yeats." Yeats Eliot Review 19.2 (Aug 2002) 13–24. doi:10.17613/M6KK55
- Jordan, Anthony J. Yeats-Gonne-MacBride Triangle, Westport Books 2000. ISBN 0-9524447-4-7.
- Paseta Senia, Irish Nationalist Women 1900–1918, Cambridge University Press 2013.
