= Lucien Millevoye =

French journalist and politician (1850-1918)

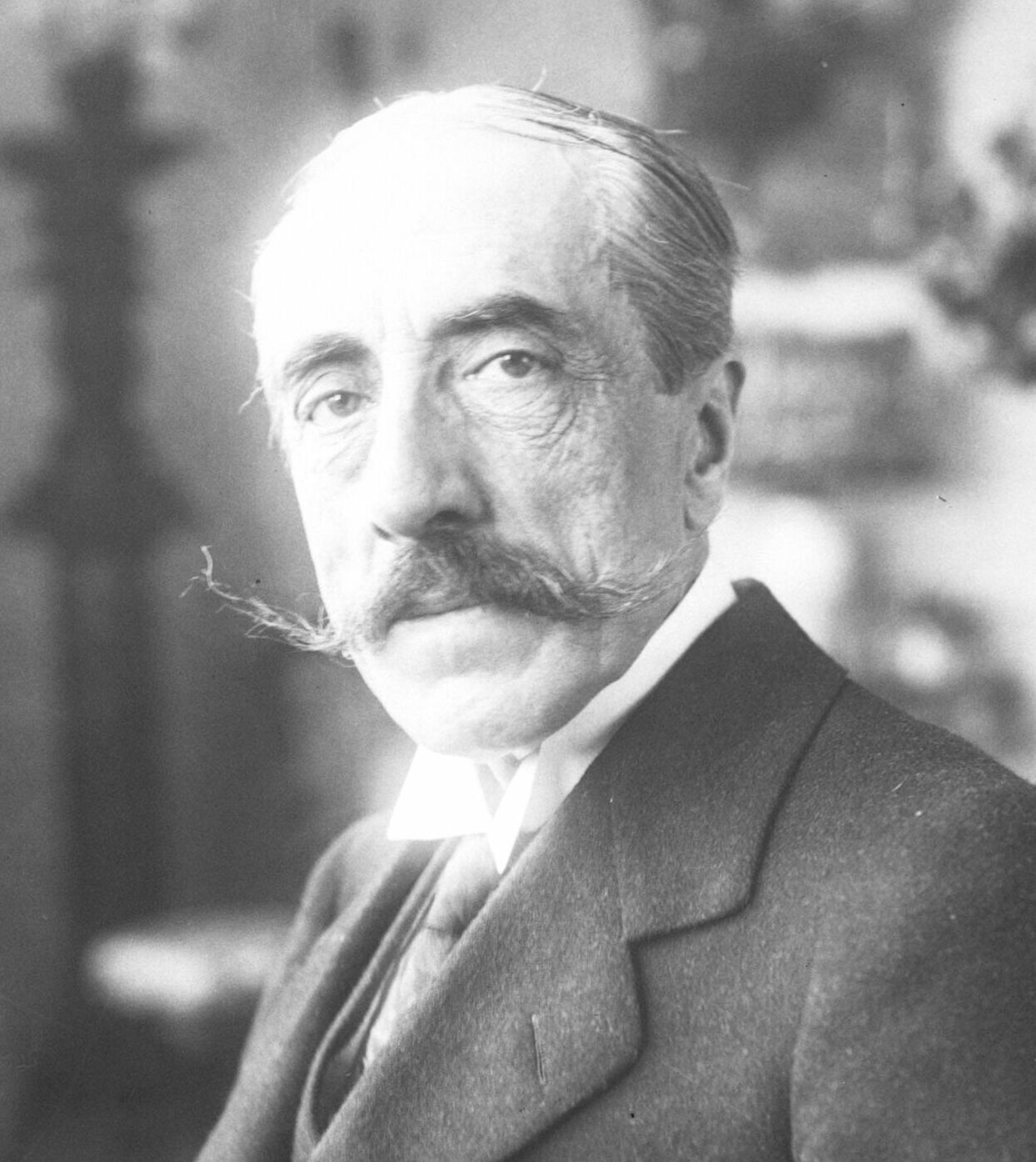
Lucien Millevoye in 1914

Lucien Millevoye (1 August 1850 – 25 March 1918) was a French journalist and right-wing politician, now best known for his relationship with the Irish revolutionary and muse of W. B. Yeats, Maud Gonne.

Millevoye was born in Grenoble in 1850, the grandson of the poet Charles Hubert Millevoye. He was the editor of La Patrie and a supporter of General Boulanger. He served as Boulangist member for Amiens in the French Chamber of Deputies from 1889 to 1893. He was elected a Nationalist deputy from Paris in 1898 and 1902. In the late 1880s he went to Russia to further the cause of a Franco-Russian Alliance. He claimed to be Boulanger's emissary to the Russian Emperor in St Petersburg, a claim Boulanger himself apparently denied. He also supported the Entente Cordiale.

During the late 1880s and throughout the 1890s, following his separation from his wife Adrienne, he had a relationship with the Irish activist Maud Gonne which produced two children, Georges Silvère (1890–1891) who died of meningitis, and Iseult Lucille Germaine (1894–1954). Gonne was deeply involved in the Irish independence movement, editing the French language nationalist newspaper L'Irlande Libre in the run-up to the centennial of the 1798 Rebellion. Gonne left Millevoye in the summer of 1900 and returned to Ireland with Iseult.

From 1898 until his death in 1918 Millevoye served as the deputy for Paris, where he died on 25 March 1918. He was originally entombed at Père Lachaise Cemetery in Paris, France, but moved to an unknown location in Abbeville per Père Lachaise Cemetery records.
