= Race to Berlin =

Competition between Soviet marshals Georgy Zhukov and Ivan Konev

The Race to Berlin
- Part of World War II, Eastern Front
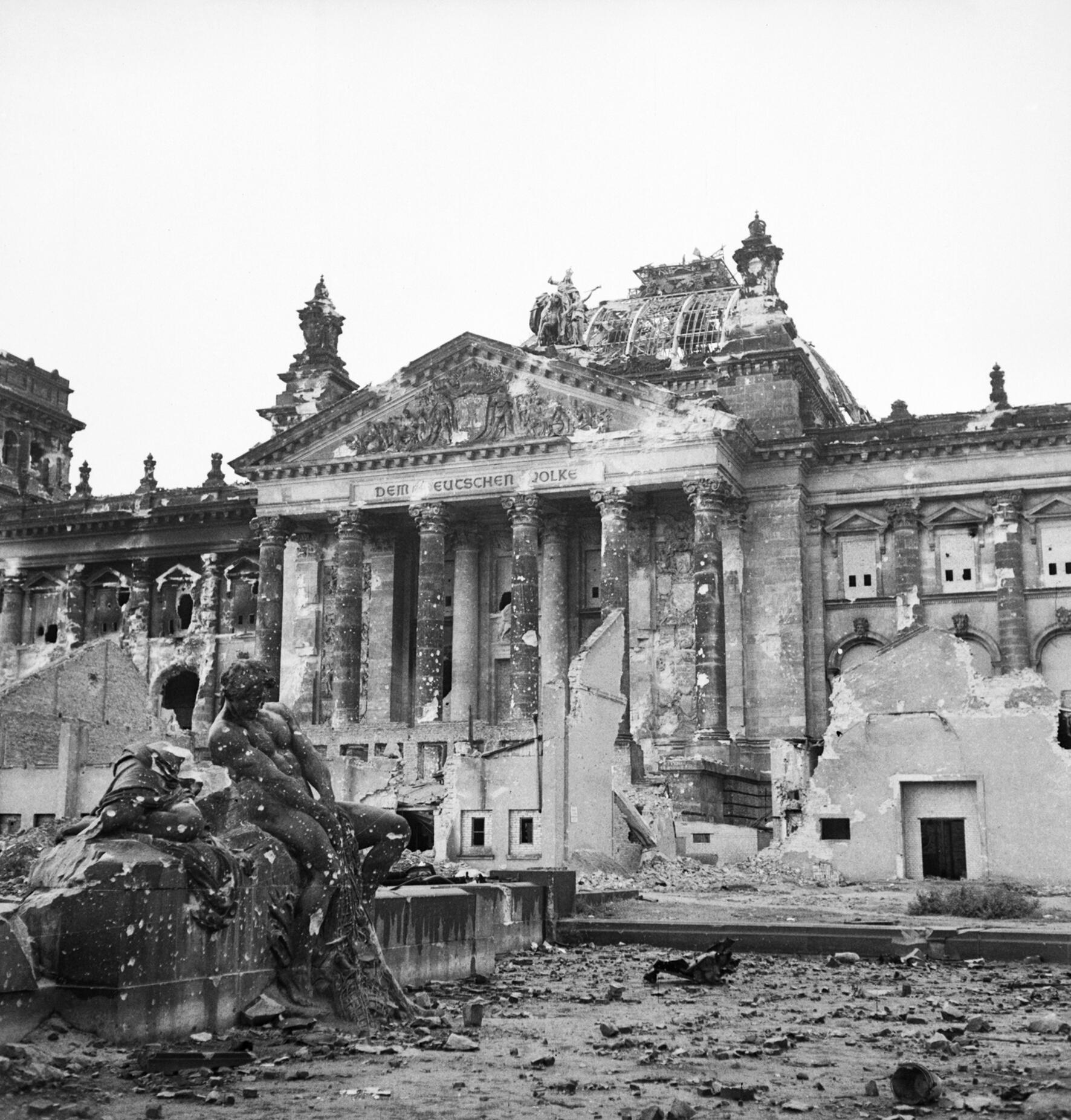
- The Reichstag was a target that both Soviet army officers wanted.
- Date: 15–23 April 1945
- Location: Germany
- Outcome: 1st Belorussian Front succeeds Marshal Georgy Zhukov, commanding the 1st Belorussian Front, manages to reach the Berlin city-centre first and wins

The Race to Berlin was a competition between Soviet Marshals Georgy Zhukov and Ivan Konev to be the first to enter Berlin during the final months of World War II in Europe.

In early 1945, with Germany's defeat inevitable, Soviet Premier Joseph Stalin set his two marshals in a race to capture Berlin. Although the race was mostly between one another, both marshals were supported by other fronts. Marshal Zhukov was protected by Konstantin Rokossovsky's Second Belorussian Front, and Marshal Konev was supported by Andrei Yeremenko's Fourth Ukrainian Front. Their separately-commanded armies were pitted against each other, ensuring they would drive their men as fast and as far as possible to a quick victory, leading to the climactic Battle of Berlin.

The Soviet advance and ultimate capture of the German capital was not opposed by the Western Allies. In an effort to avoid a diplomatic issue, US Army General of the Army Dwight Eisenhower had ordered his forces into the south of Germany to cut off and to wipe out the Wehrmacht there, and to avoid the possibility that the German government would attempt to hold out in a national redoubt in the Alps. The Yalta Conference had already determined that both Germany and Berlin would be divided into four zones of occupation.

== Prelude ==
After the Allies agreed at the Yalta Conference to specific zones of influence within Germany, the two Soviet armies raced to win control of Berlin, perhaps motivated by a desire to gain control of the German nuclear research program in the Kaiser Wilhelm Institute before the Americans.

== The western front ==
Since the Allies landed in Normandy, the British and American armies (among affiliated Western Allied forces) had moved swiftly and decisively to take western cities in France, and to liberate Paris. By September 1944, Allied forces had reached the German border, but the subsequent failure of Operation Market Garden prevented a decisive breakthrough into the heart of Germany by the end of the year. In December, Hitler launched an unsuccessful offensive known as the Battle of the Bulge. In March 1945, the Allies crossed the Rhine in a decisive manner, but the casualties taken by Allied forces in the Ardennes in the previous months and the distance remaining to reach Berlin dampened Eisenhower's drive to take Berlin before the Soviets.

=== Final moves by Western Allies ===
General Eisenhower's armies were facing resistance that varied from being almost nonexistent to fanatical as they advanced toward Berlin, which was 200 km (120 mi) from their positions in early April 1945. British Prime Minister, Winston Churchill urged Eisenhower to continue the advance toward Berlin by the 21st Army Group, under the command of Field Marshal Montgomery, with the intention of capturing the city. Even General George S. Patton agreed with Churchill that he should order the attack on the city since Montgomery's troops could reach Berlin within three days. The British and the Americans contemplated an airborne operation before the attack. In Operation Eclipse, the 17th Airborne Division, 82nd Airborne Division, 101st Airborne Division, and a British brigade were to seize the Tempelhof, Rangsdorf, Gatow, Staaken, and Oranienburg airfields. In Berlin, the Reichsbanner resistance organization identified possible drop zones for Allied paratroopers, and they planned to guide them past German defenses into the city.

However, General Omar Bradley warned that capturing a city located in a region that the Soviets had already received by the Yalta Conference might cost 100,000 casualties. By April 15, Eisenhower had ordered all armies to halt when they reached the Elbe and Mulde rivers, thus immobilizing the spearheads while the war continued for three more weeks. The 21st Army Group was then instead ordered to move northeast toward Bremen and Hamburg. The U.S. Ninth and First Armies held their ground from Magdeburg through Leipzig to western Czechoslovakia, but Eisenhower ordered three Allied field armies (1st French, and the U.S. Seventh and Third Armies) into southeastern Germany and Austria. Advancing from northern Italy, the British Eighth Army pushed to the borders of Yugoslavia to defeat the remaining Wehrmacht elements there. That later caused some friction with the Yugoslav People's Army, notably around Trieste.

== From the east ==
At the end of January 1945, the Red Army was about 88 kilometers from the outskirts of Berlin.

Soviet forces took to the offensive after the spectacular defeat of Army Group Centre following Operation Bagration in 1944 from which the Wehrmacht forces never recovered. In the winter of 1944 they pushed the German front lines back across Poland, with heavy casualties on both sides. That winter would turn out to be a bloody one, as the fighting came closer to Germany. Stalin had wanted to settle the score since Hitler's breach of their non-aggression pact. Using his Marshals Zhukov and Konev, he was determined to beat Eisenhower to Berlin and the Reichstag. The Soviet Army ultimately captured Berlin. On 15 April 1945, the Soviet Union fired a massive barrage of some one million artillery shells, one of the largest in history, onto the German positions west of the Oder.

=== Zhukov's 1st Belorussian Front ===
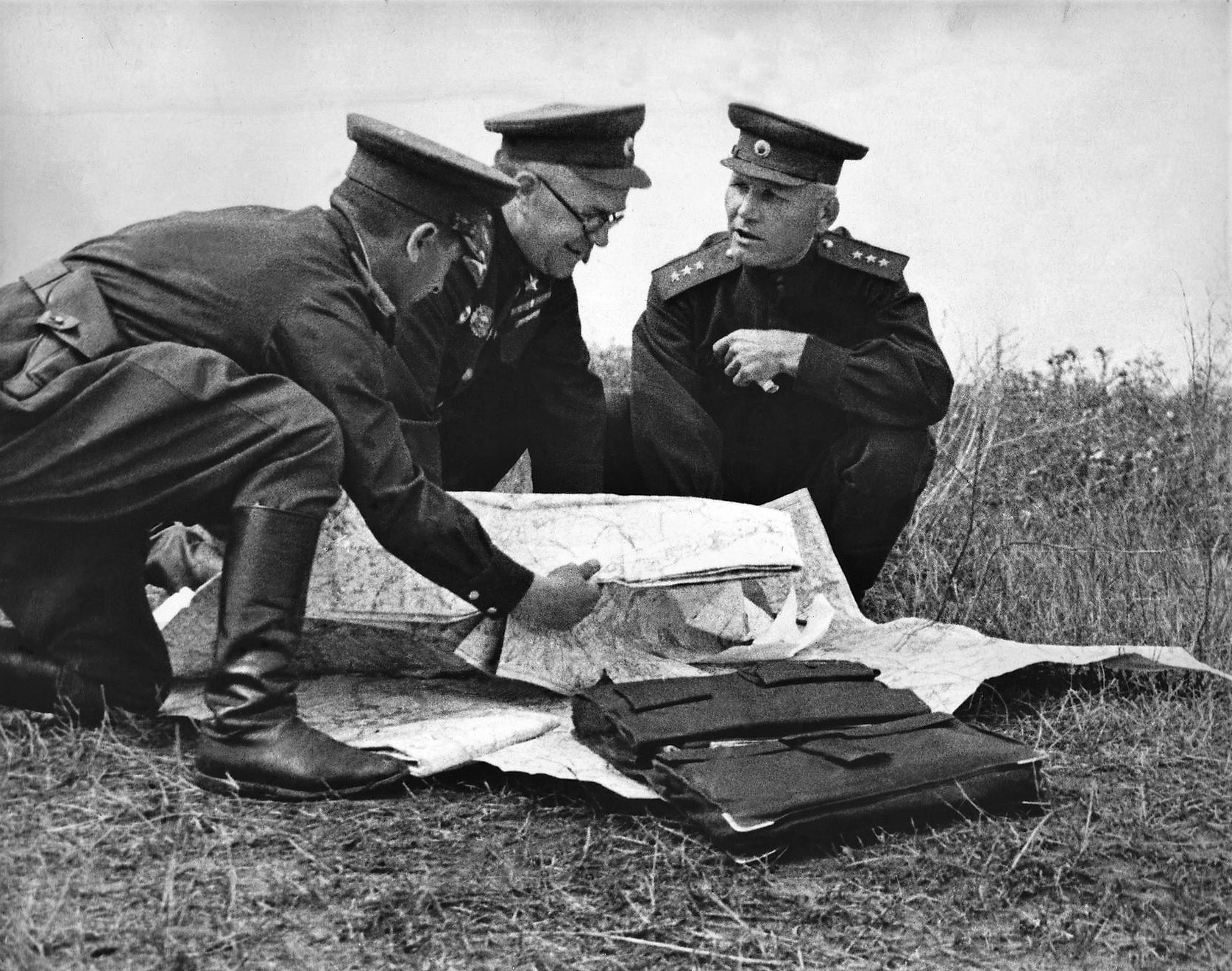
Zhukov with Konev

After the devastating attack, Marshal Zhukov's troops advanced towards Berlin, only to be ambushed by German soldiers who had withdrawn from their positions in the Oder to the fortified positions of the Seelow Heights further west after they had received intelligence about the expected artillery barrage from a captured Red Army soldier. Zhukov, seeing that his plan was not working, decided to send wave after wave of Soviet soldiers to destroy the German resistance. "According to one Russian veteran, Soviet artillery was fired without proper guidance, killing scores of Red Army soldiers." For three days, the attacks still relentlessly came. After the fourth day, the 1st Belorussian Front finally broke through the German defensive line but at a high cost in casualties. That provided the opportunity to advance on Berlin, 90 km (56 mi) to the west.

=== Rokossovsky's 2nd Belorussian Front ===
Stalin ordered the 2nd Belorussian Front, commanded by Marshal Rokossovsky, to support Zhukov's 1st Belorussian Front to the south. Although Rokossovsky's Front was not chosen to lead the attack at the Seelow Heights, it did benefit Zhukov's Front. It was the actions of Rokossovsky's Front that allowed Zhukov's Front to concentrate on their sector of the front-line while the 2nd Belorussian Front to attack in the lower half of the Oder, between Schwedt and the Baltic Sea coast. This attack on the northern flank of the German Seelow Heights position by the 2nd Belorussian Front helped to reduce resistance on the 1st Belorussian Front sector, and made it possible for the 1st Belorussian Front to emerge victorious at the battle of the Seelow Heights.

=== Konev's 1st Ukrainian Front ===
While Zhukov's Front was fighting the German forces at the Seelow Heights, Marshal Konev and his 1st Ukrainian Front was attacking the remaining German 9th Army that was trapped within pockets in the Spree Forest region near the town of Halbe.

The 9th Army's first attempt at breaking out of this pocket resulted in the capture of almost 5,000 of its troops, and the loss of 200 guns, mortars and 40 tanks captured by the Red Army. The survivors detected a weakly held sector in the 1st Ukrainian Front's position and attempted a second breakout. A large part of the 9th Army was able to escape through this breach before Konev's staff realized their mistake and sent troops to deal with the unlucky rear guard Germans who were caught in the open by the Red Army. The 9th Army's last attempt to escape resulted in many German deaths, but allowed 25,000 soldiers to escape and regroup with the 12th Army sector of the front. From there, they retreated west toward the Elbe, hoping to surrender to the U.S. Army.

=== Yeremenko's 4th Ukrainian Front ===
General of Army Andrei Yeremenko and his 4th Ukrainian Front was deployed south-west of Marshal Konev's Front, and was ordered by Stalin to continue the offensive against German forces in Saxony to the west.

=== Malinovsky's 2nd Ukrainian Front ===
The 2nd Ukrainian Front was to attack into Austria, under the command of Marshal Rodion Malinovsky, under the orders of Stalin to deny Hitler the ability to transfer German troops north to defend the Berlin area as the Red Army approached.

== From Berlin ==
As the end of Nazi Germany approached, Hitler, still not wanting to give up, issued orders that were impossible for the Germans to execute given the situation. While meeting in his secret bunker under Berlin, Hitler's chief staff members offered personnel to defend the Oder. Commander Hermann Göring of the Luftwaffe offered 100,000 Luftwaffe men; Heinrich Himmler offered 25,000 SS troopers; and Admiral Dönitz offered 12,000 navy men. However, the new commander of Army Group Vistula, Commander Gotthard Heinrici, who had replaced Himmler, did not agree with the personnel addition and believed that the inexperienced soldiers would be useless and ultimately slaughtered. Göring countered that statement by stating that his Luftwaffe men were "Übermenschen" or superhuman. Hitler ended their argument by telling Heinrici that reinforcements would arrive in time. Heinrici disagreed with Hitler's statement but kept it to himself.

== The outcome ==
Zhukov's Front entered Berlin from the north then expanded north-west from the Oder River. Konev's Front had chosen the southern areas of Berlin to enter from. Both Fronts continued to expand north-west in an attempt to complete a pincer movement and encircle Berlin. On 23 April 1945, Konev's 1st Ukrainian Front finally linked up with members of Zhukov's 1st Belorussian Front, thereby ending any hope for the Germans to escape.

== See also ==
- Battle of Berlin
- Charles Thau
