= Maud Gonne =

English-born Irish revolutionary and suffragette (1866–1953)

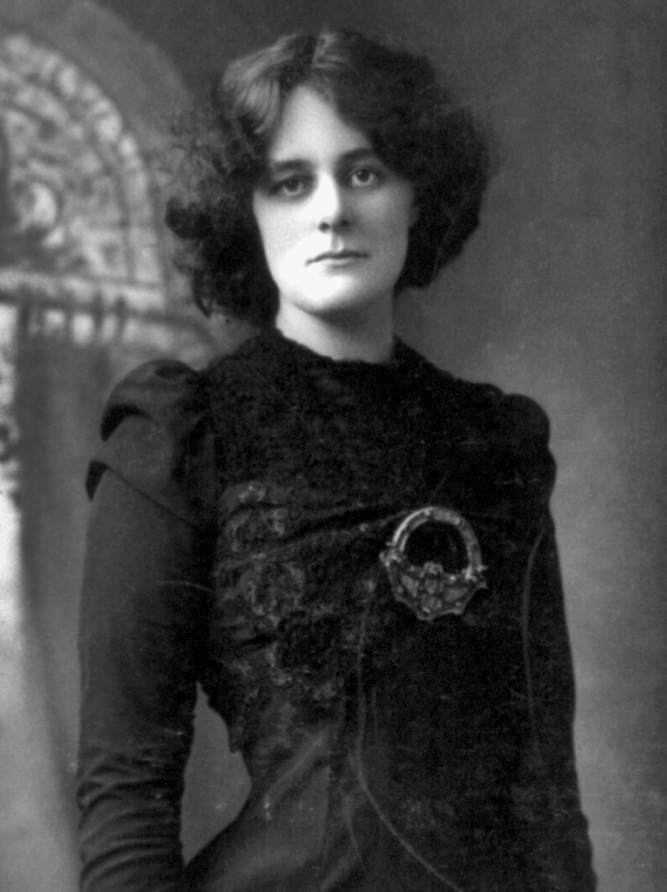
- Gonne in 1901
- Born: Edith Maud Gonne; 21 December 1866; Tongham, Surrey, England
- Died: 27 April 1953 (aged 86); Clonskeagh, Ireland
- Occupation: Activist
- Spouse: John MacBride (m. 1903; sep. 1906)
- Children: Georges Silvère (1890–1891); Iseult Gonne; Seán MacBride
- Parents: Thomas Gonne (father); Edith Frith Gonne (née Cook) (mother)

Maud Gonne MacBride (Irish: Maud Nic Ghoinn Bean Mhic Giolla Bhríghde; born Edith Maud Gonne; 21 December 1866 – 27 April 1953) was an English-born Irish republican, suffragette and actress. Gonne actively agitated for Irish home rule and then for the republic declared in 1916. During the 1930s, as a founding member of the Social Credit Party, she promoted the distributive programme of C. H. Douglas. At the outbreak of the Second World War in 1939, she expressed support for Nazi Germany. Gonne was best known for being the muse and long-time love interest of Irish poet W. B. Yeats.

== Early life ==
Gonne was born in England at Tongham near Aldershot, Hampshire, in 1866, the eldest daughter of Captain Thomas Gonne of the 17th Lancers and Edith Frith Gonne (née Cook), both from established English families. Despite this, she sought to claim an Irish lineage, writing in her autobiography A Servant of the Queen that she was "the daughter of an Irish father and an English mother" and suggesting that her family came from County Mayo before being disinherited and turning to the wine trade. No evidence supports this assertion and biographers have confirmed her ancestry was English for generations. (Note: Gonne's claim, however, was repeated uncritically for decades, gaining currency through reviews of her autobiography, obituaries and historical works, even though it had already been contradicted publicly during her divorce proceedings from John MacBride in 1905. Writers such as Dorothy Macardle and Robert Kee echoed the story, while others, like Elizabeth Coxhead, noted the truth that the Gonnes were English traders with only a tenuous, long-distant Mayo connection.)

In 1868, amidst high tension in Ireland following the 1867 Fenian Rising, Captain Thomas Gonne was appointed brigade major of the cavalry in Ireland and stationed at the Curragh Camp in County Kildare. That year, Maud's sister Kathleen was born and the family lived at Airfield near Donnybrook, Dublin, where Maud befriended Ida Jameson of the distilling family. Edith Gonne, suffering from tuberculosis, gave birth in London to another daughter, Margaretta, in 1871; both mother and child died soon after. Tuberculosis continued to affect Maud and Kathleen throughout their lives. The family moved between the Curragh and Howth for health reasons, and Howth became a place of lasting personal importance to Gonne.

After Edith's death, Maud and Kathleen lived with relatives in London before joining their grandfather, Francis Cook, 1st Viscount of Monserrate, at Doughty House, Richmond, which housed an extensive and important art collection (he was extremely rich through the family's clothing and textile business). In 1876, Major Gonne became military attaché to the Austrian court, taking the family to the south of France, where Maud grew fluent in French. Following a posting in India, Thomas travelled through Europe with Maud until 1882, when he returned to Dublin as assistant adjutant-general. Maud later recalled attending public events at Dublin Castle, including witnessing the state entry of the new lord lieutenant on 6 May 1882, the day of the Phoenix Park murders, and participating in the Castle season of 1886, which featured a St Patrick's night ball attended by the future King George V.

== Early career ==
=== Dublin, London and Paris ===
In 1882, her father was posted to Dublin. She accompanied him and remained with him until his death in 1886.

In 1889, she first met W. B. Yeats, who fell in love with her. Gonne was attracted to the occultist and spiritualist worlds deeply important to Yeats, asking his friends about the reality of reincarnation. In 1891 she briefly joined the Hermetic Order of the Golden Dawn, an occultist organisation with which Yeats had involved himself.

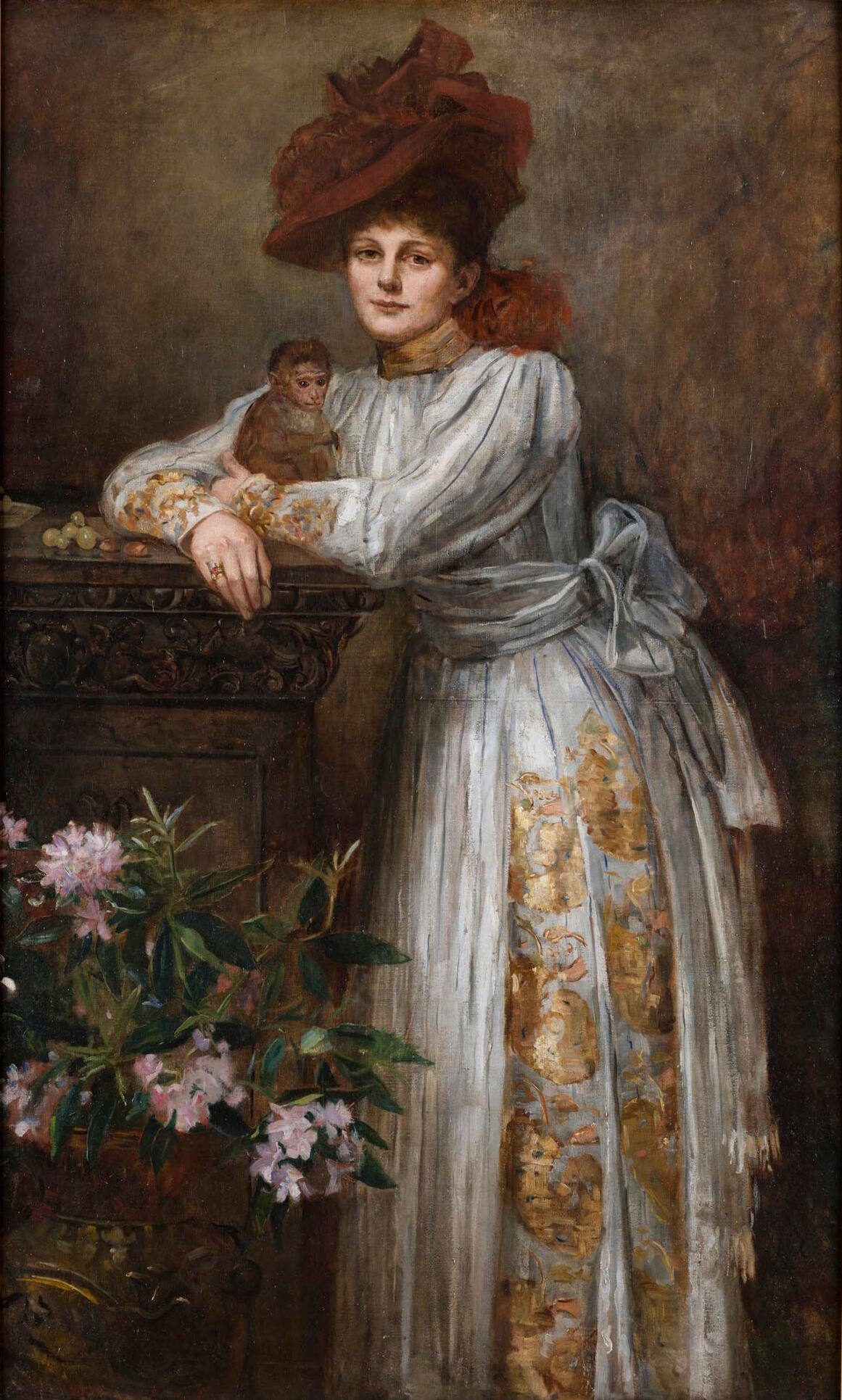
Miss Maud Gonne (1890), an oil painting by Sarah Henrietta Purser

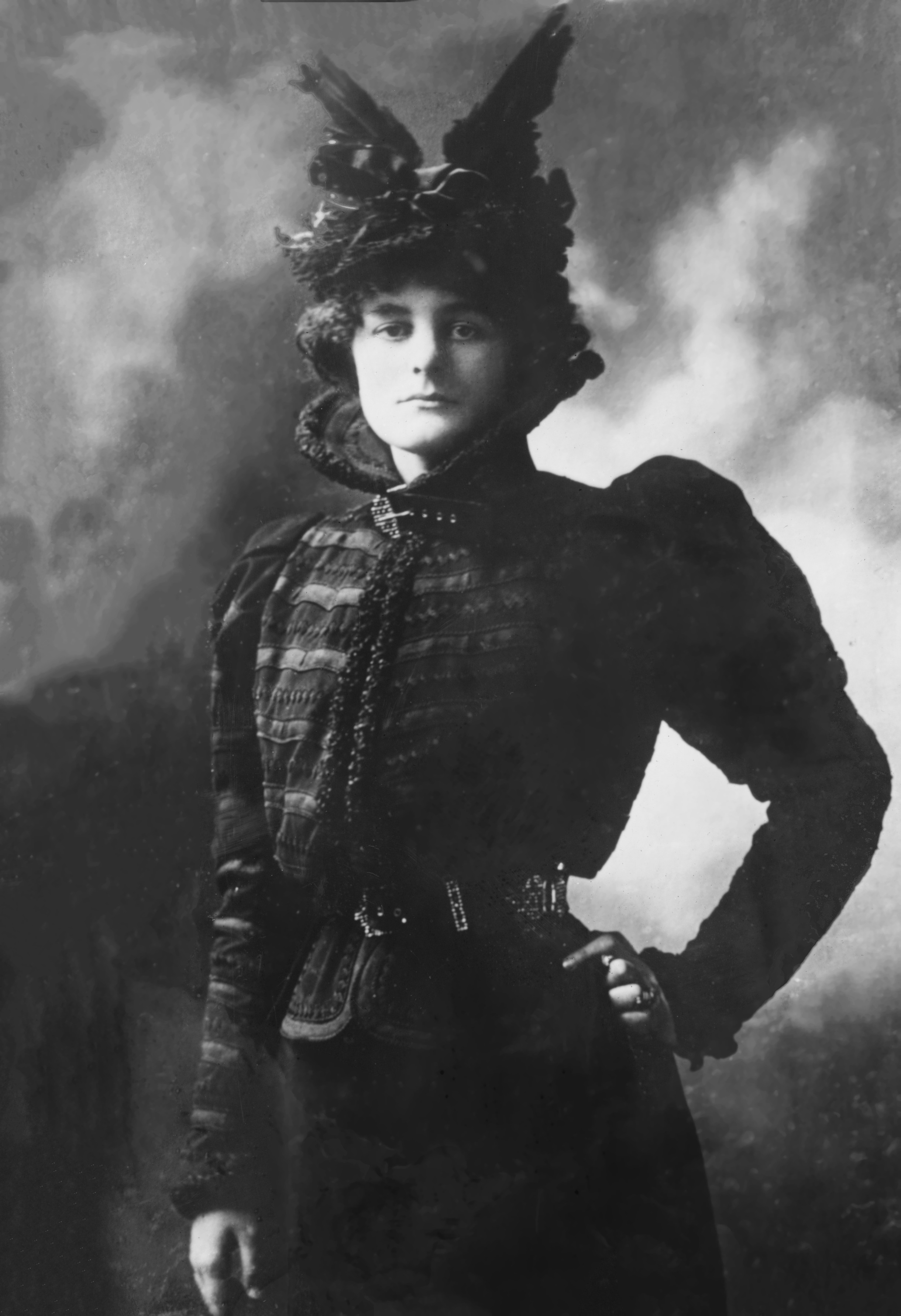
Gonne in a photographic portrait, circa the 1890s

In 1890, in France she met French politician and journalist Lucien Millevoye. They had a son, Georges, but the child died within the year, possibly of meningitis. Gonne was distraught and buried him in a large memorial chapel. (Her distress remained with her; in her will she asked for Georges' baby shoes to be interred with her.) After the child's death, she separated from Millevoye, but in late 1893 arranged to meet him at the mausoleum in Samois-sur-Seine and, according to Yeats, next to their child's sarcophagus, supposedly had sexual intercourse. Her alleged purpose was to conceive a baby with the same father, to whom the soul of Georges would transmigrate in metempsychosis. Gonne's daughter by Millevoye, Iseult Gonne, was born in August 1894.

=== Inghinidhe na hÉireann ===
During the 1890s, Gonne travelled extensively throughout England, Wales, Scotland and the United States campaigning for the nationalist cause, forming an organisation called the "Irish League" (L'association irlandaise) in 1896.

In 1900, Gonne helped found Inghinidhe na hÉireann (Daughters of Ireland). Twenty-nine women attended the first meeting. They decided to "combat in every way English influence doing so much injury to the artistic taste and refinement of the Irish people".

=== Sinn Féin ===
In her autobiography Gonne wrote "I have always hated war and am by nature and philosophy a pacifist, but it is the English who are forcing war on us, and the first principle of war is to kill the enemy".

A second organisation, the National Council, was formed in 1903 by Gonne and others, including Arthur Griffith, on the occasion of the visit of King Edward VII to Dublin. Its purpose was to lobby Dublin Corporation to refrain from presenting an address to the king. The motion to present an address was duly defeated, but the National Council remained in existence as a pressure group with the aim of increasing nationalist representation on local councils.

The first annual convention of the National Council on 28 November 1905 was notable for two things: the decision, by a majority vote (with Griffith dissenting), to open branches and organise on a national basis; and the presentation by Griffith of his 'Hungarian' policy, which was now called the Sinn Féin policy. This meeting is usually taken as the date of the foundation of the Sinn Féin party.

== Acting ==
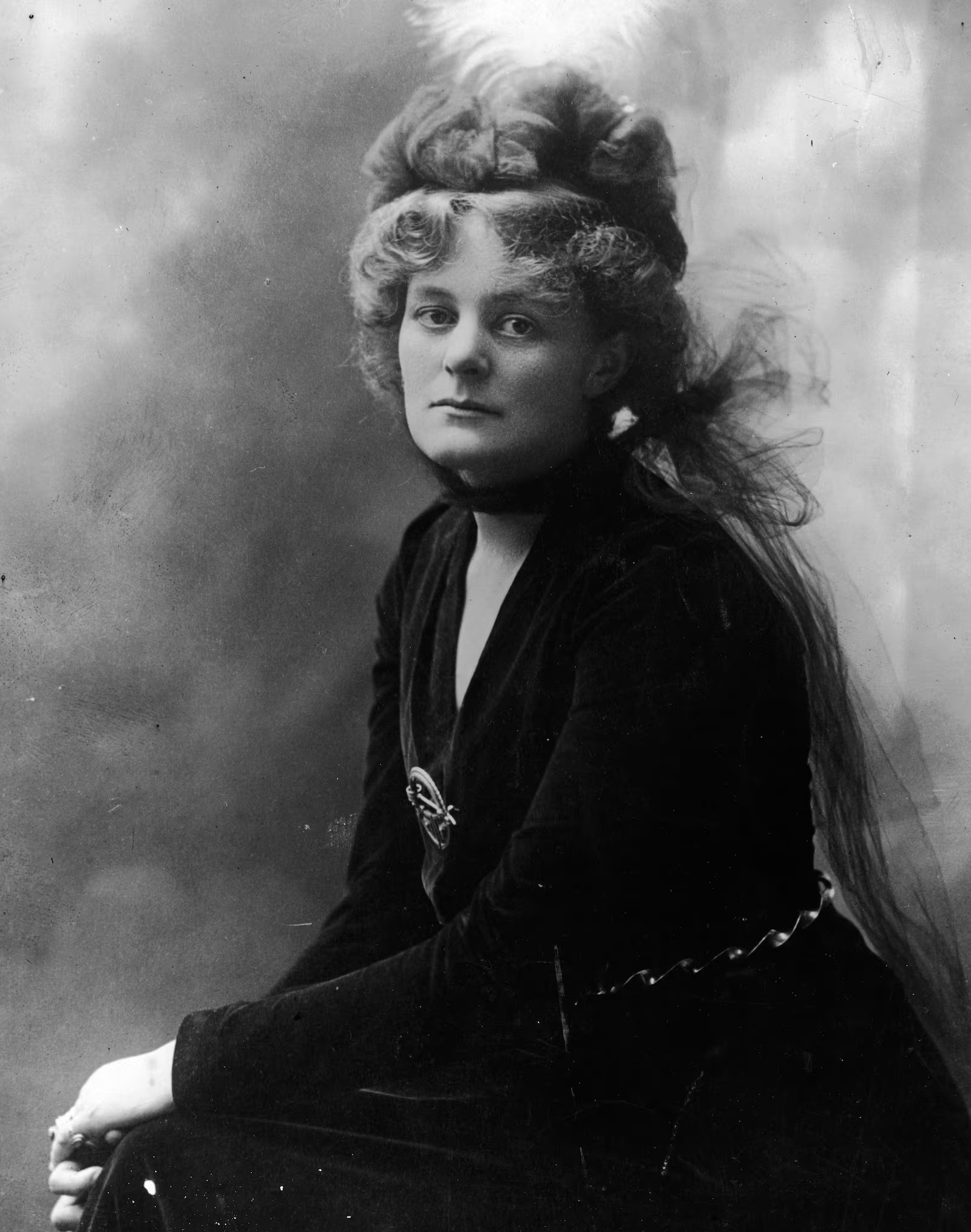
Gonne, c. 1890s

In 1897, along with Yeats and Griffith, she organised protests against Queen Victoria's Diamond Jubilee. In April 1902, she took a leading role in Yeats' play Cathleen Ní Houlihan. She portrayed Cathleen, the "old woman of Ireland", who mourns for her four provinces which had been "lost" to the British. She was already spending much of her time in Paris.

In the same year, she joined the Roman Catholic Church. She refused many marriage proposals from Yeats, not only because he was unwilling to convert to Catholicism and because she viewed him as insufficiently radical in his nationalism, but also because she believed his unrequited love for her had been a boon for his poetry and that the world should thank her for never having accepted his proposals. When Yeats told her he was not happy without her, she replied,

Oh yes, you are, because you make beautiful poetry out of what you call your unhappiness and are happy in that. Marriage would be such a dull affair. Poets should never marry. The world should thank me for not marrying you.

== Marriage to John MacBride ==
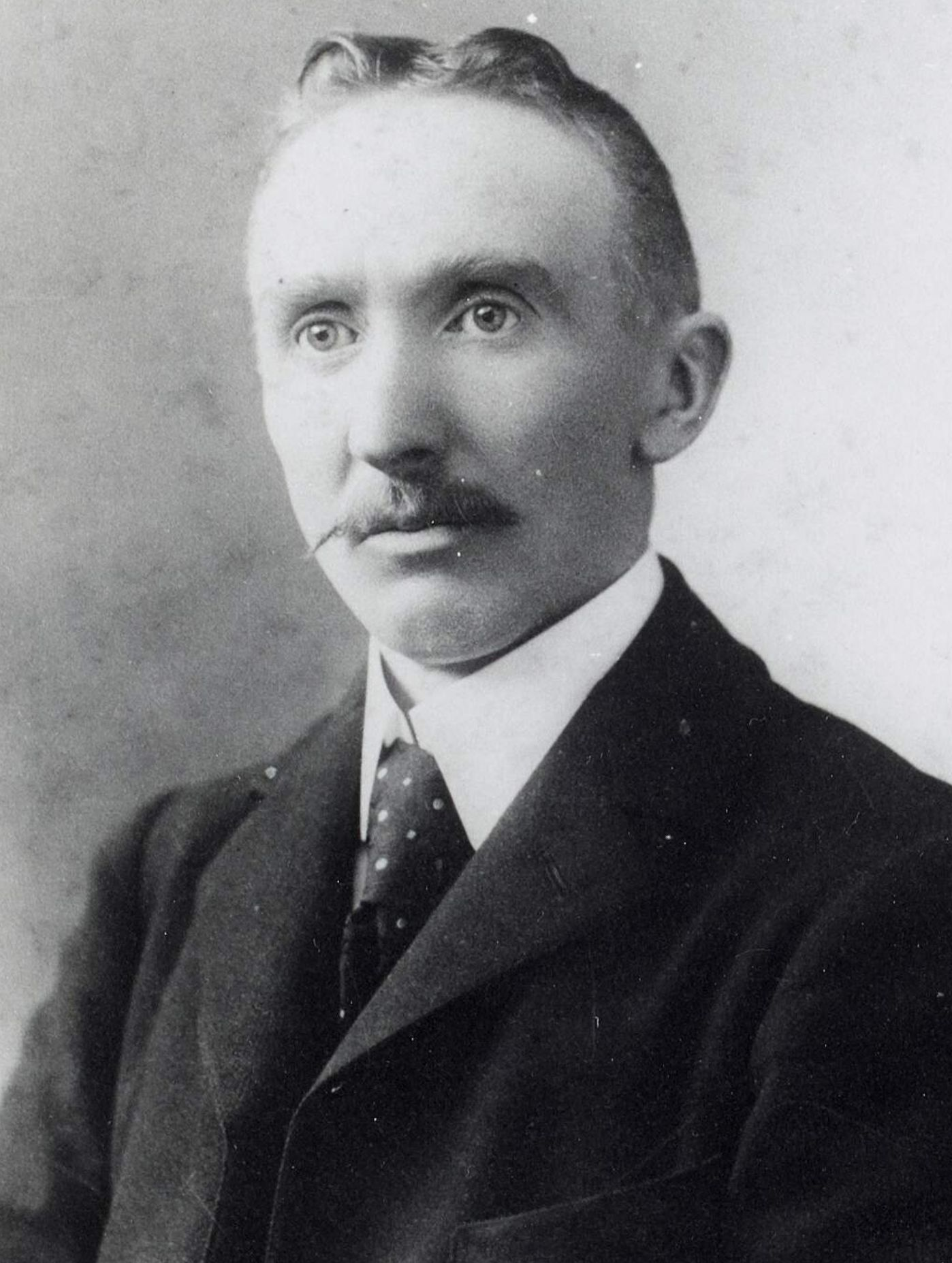
MacBride, photographed in 1901

In the winter of 1900, Maud Gonne met Major John MacBride at the Gare de Lyon in Paris, where he arrived from the Transvaal to begin his exile after fighting with the Irish Transvaal Brigade against the British in the Second Boer War. Both were active in Irish nationalist circles in the French capital, and their shared political commitments soon brought them closer. They toured the United States together in 1901 and again in 1902, speaking at nationalist gatherings and raising support for the Irish cause.

In Paris in February 1903, after having turned down at least four marriage proposals from W. B. Yeats between 1891 and 1901, Gonne married MacBride. Yeats pleaded with her not to go through with the marriage, as did Arthur Griffith, who was close to both of them, but Gonne was undeterred. Despite opposition from her own family and from the MacBrides, she converted to Catholicism on 17 February and married MacBride four days later in Paris. Almost immediately, she began to feel she had made a mistake. Later writings by MacBride suggest that he found her bohemian independence incompatible with his expectations of a wife and that he hoped she would renounce significant parts of her past. The growing distance between them soon became evident in Gonne's extended visits to Ireland, where MacBride, still under threat of arrest for his role in the Boer War, could not safely follow. The following year their only child, Seán MacBride, was born.

The marriage quickly broke down. By late 1904 Gonne and MacBride were living apart, and on 28 February 1905 she initiated legal proceedings in Paris seeking a divorce and full custody of their son. The French court did not grant a divorce. The only allegation upheld against MacBride was one instance of drunkenness. He was awarded visitation rights twice weekly, while custody of Seán was given to Gonne.

In the aftermath of the case, Gonne accused MacBride of domestic violence and Yeats later alleged that MacBride had sexually molested Iseult, Gonne's daughter from her previous relationship with Millevoye. Yeats repeated the claim in private correspondence and it has been discussed by several of his biographers. The charge was never substantiated in court, nor mentioned in Iseult's own writings, and its reliability has been debated by historians. Some scholars argue that Yeats may have exaggerated or fabricated the story, motivated by his personal animosity towards MacBride after Gonne chose to marry him. Others note that Francis Stuart, Iseult's later husband, claimed she told him the allegation was true. Gonne herself raised the matter privately with MacBride's brother Anthony, but it was excluded from her court filings; the MacBride family subsequently introduced it in court to defend John's reputation.

The case became widely publicised, with MacBride's subsequent libel action against the Irish Independent keeping the scandal in the public eye. The controversy severely damaged Gonne's standing in nationalist circles, where she had previously been a prominent figure, and left her largely sidelined from advanced politics until 1916. Following the separation, MacBride returned to Ireland and had little further contact with his son, who was raised by Gonne in Paris. He later became involved with Sinn Féin and the Irish Volunteers. Arrested for his part in the Easter Rising, MacBride was court-martialled and executed by firing squad at Kilmainham Gaol on 5 May 1916, alongside James Connolly and other leaders of the rebellion.

Gonne's reaction to his death was ambivalent but public. Though their marriage had ended bitterly, she prayed for him and paid tribute to his sacrifice, later appearing in public mourning. In correspondence with Yeats, she described his execution as an expiatory act. MacBride's death also allowed her to settle permanently in Ireland without fear of legal claims over custody of her son.

In 1916, Yeats, in his fifties, proposed first to Maud Gonne, who turned him down, and then to the 23-year-old Iseult, who did not accept either. He had known her since she was four and often referred to her as his darling child, taking a paternal interest in her writings (many Dubliners wrongly suspected that Yeats was her father). Iseult considered the proposal, but finally turned him down, because he was not really in love with her and it would upset her mother too much.

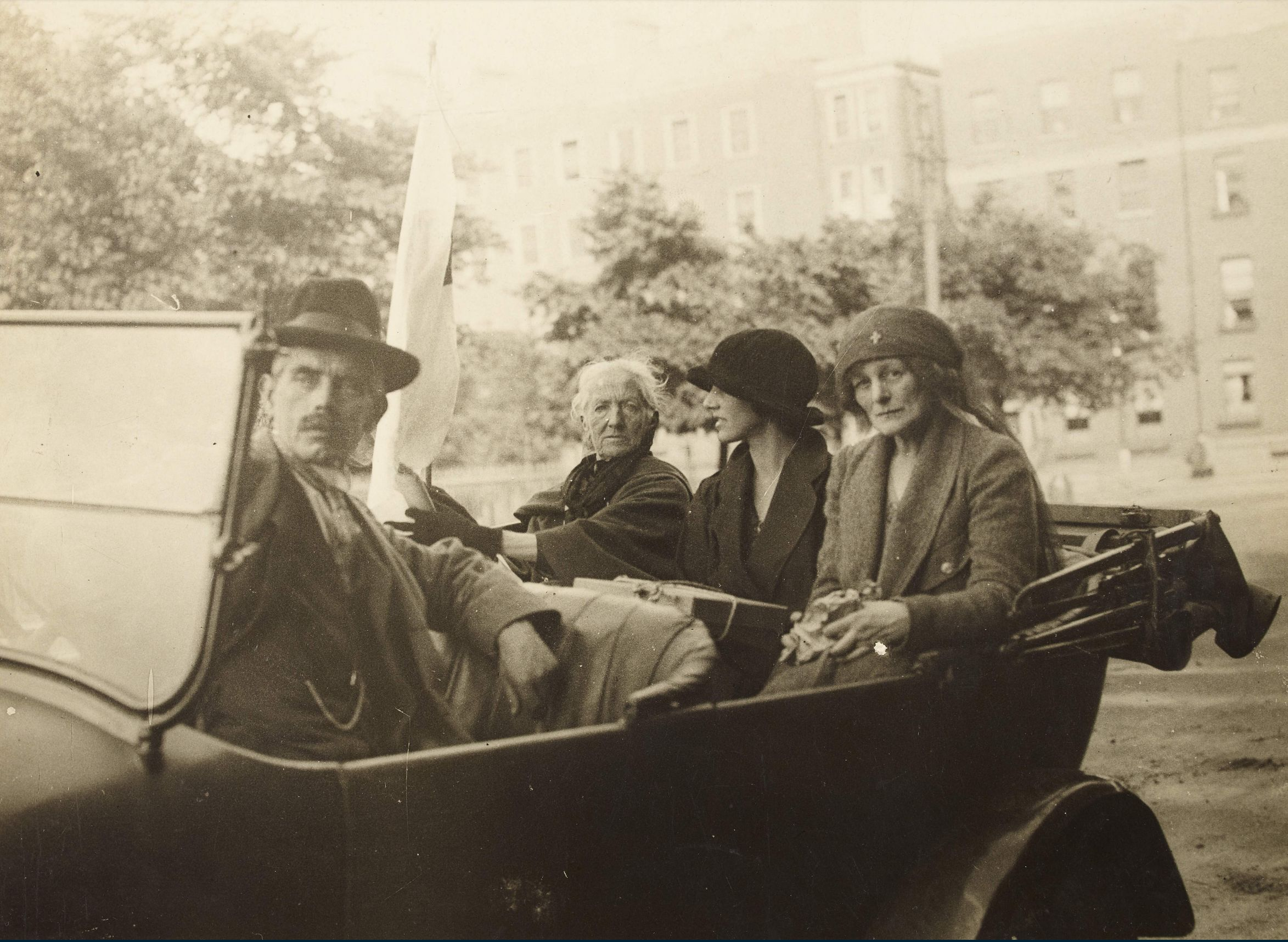
Maud Gonne (far right) with relief agency members in Dublin in July 1922

== Irish republican activism ==
Known as the "Irish Joan of Arc", Gonne became known for her Irish republican views on a variety of contemporary social issues in Ireland. During the fin de siècle era, she supported Irish Catholic tenant farmers in their struggles against the Protestant Ascendancy and the Royal Irish Constabulary (RIC) during the Land War. Gonne chaired several meetings of international groups to build sympathy for her causes among the American, British and French publics. During the Second Boer War, Gonne, along with a small group of republicans, supported the Boer republics by giving speeches and publishing newspaper articles advocating against Irish involvement in the war. Gonne became known for her eloquence in her political speeches and they were credited for animating the founding of new Irish nationalist organisations.

In April 1900, Gonne wrote an article titled "The Famine Queen" for the United Irishman newspaper on the occasion of a planned visit by Queen Victoria to Ireland. The newspaper was suppressed by the RIC but the article was republished in American newspapers.

Gonne remained very active in Paris. In 1913, she established L'Irlande libre, a French newspaper. She wanted Cumann na mBan to be considered seriously: her idea was to get affiliation with the British Red Cross, and she wrote to Geneva to gain an international profile for the new nationalist organisation. In 1918, she was arrested in Dublin, deported to England and imprisoned in Holloway Prison for six months.

Gonne worked with the Irish White Cross for the relief of victims of violence. Lord French's sister, Mrs Charlotte Despard, was a famous suffragist, who was already a Sinn Feiner when she arrived in Dublin in 1920. She naturally accompanied Gonne on a tour of County Cork, seat of the most fervent revolutionary activity. Cork was under a Martial Law Area (MLA) prohibited to Irishmen and women outside the zone but the Viceroy's sister had a pass.

In 1921, she opposed the Treaty and advocated the Republican side. The committee that set up White Cross in Ireland asked Gonne to join in January 1921 to distribute funds to victims administered by Cumann na mBan. She settled in Dublin in 1922. During the street battles she headed a delegation called The Women's Peace Committee which approached the Dáil leadership and her old friend Arthur Griffith, but were unable restrain the Free State's response to republican defiance, and to avoid continued civilian deaths. In August, Gonne and Despard (derided by supporters of the new government "Mad and Madame Desperate") set up the Women's Prisoners' Defence League to protest the detention and treatment of republican women, many of whom were held in men's prison, and to support their families. In November 1922, soldiers of National Army rounding up anti-Treaty opposition in the capital, ransacked Gonne's home at 75 St Stephen's Green and detained her in Mountjoy Prison. In January 1923, in a declaration reprinted in the Irish Independent under the title “Neurotic girls”, the government characterised republican women as uncompromising, and denounced their violence as unfeminine.

On 10 April 1923, Gonne was again arrested, charged with painting banners for seditious demonstrations and preparing anti-government literature. According to the diary account of her colleague Hannah Moynihan:

Last night [10th April] at 11pm, we heard the commotion which usually accompanies the arrival of new prisoners... we pestered the wardress and she told us there were four – Maud Gonne MacBride, her daughter Mrs Iseult Stuart and two lesser lights... Early this morning... we could see Maud walking majestically past our cell door leading on a leash a funny little lap dog which answered to the name that sounded like Wuzzo – Wuzzo.

She was released on 28 April, after twenty days in custody. Months later the women spread a rumour that Nell Ryan had died in custody in order to gain a propaganda victory. Women continued to be arrested. On 1 June Gonne was standing in protest outside Kilmainham Jail with Dorothy Macardle, the writer and activist, and Iseult Stuart. They were supporting hunger striker Máire Comerford. Again the source for this story seems to be fellow ex-prisoner Hannah Moynihan.

== Other activism ==
Gonne was a leading figure in the Catholic monetary reform movement in Ireland in the 1930s. Formed in 1932 as the Financial Freedom Federation, they became the Irish Social Credit Party in late 1935 and Gonne MacBride was a prominent member of the group throughout the 1930s. They were committed to reforming Ireland's financial and economic systems by way of instituting reforms laid out in the inter-war period by the originator of social credit economics, Major C.H. Douglas. In the Irish Independent in 1936, Gonne criticised Ernest Blythe's denunciation of social credit economics. Opening, she wrote; "I read with amazement the report of Mr. Blythe's broadcast attack on Social Credit. Major Douglas's contention that production has outstripped distribution with disastrous results of unemployment and starvation, tending to war and anarchy is incontrovertible, and is apparent to all in the desperate scramble for markets, the restriction of output and destruction in almost every country of consumable goods, while millions of people who need these goods are allowed to starve".

In the 1930s, she was involved in the Friends of Soviet Russia organisation. She met and was photographed with the Indian independence leader Subhas Chandra Bose when he visited Ireland in 1936.

== Yeats' muse ==
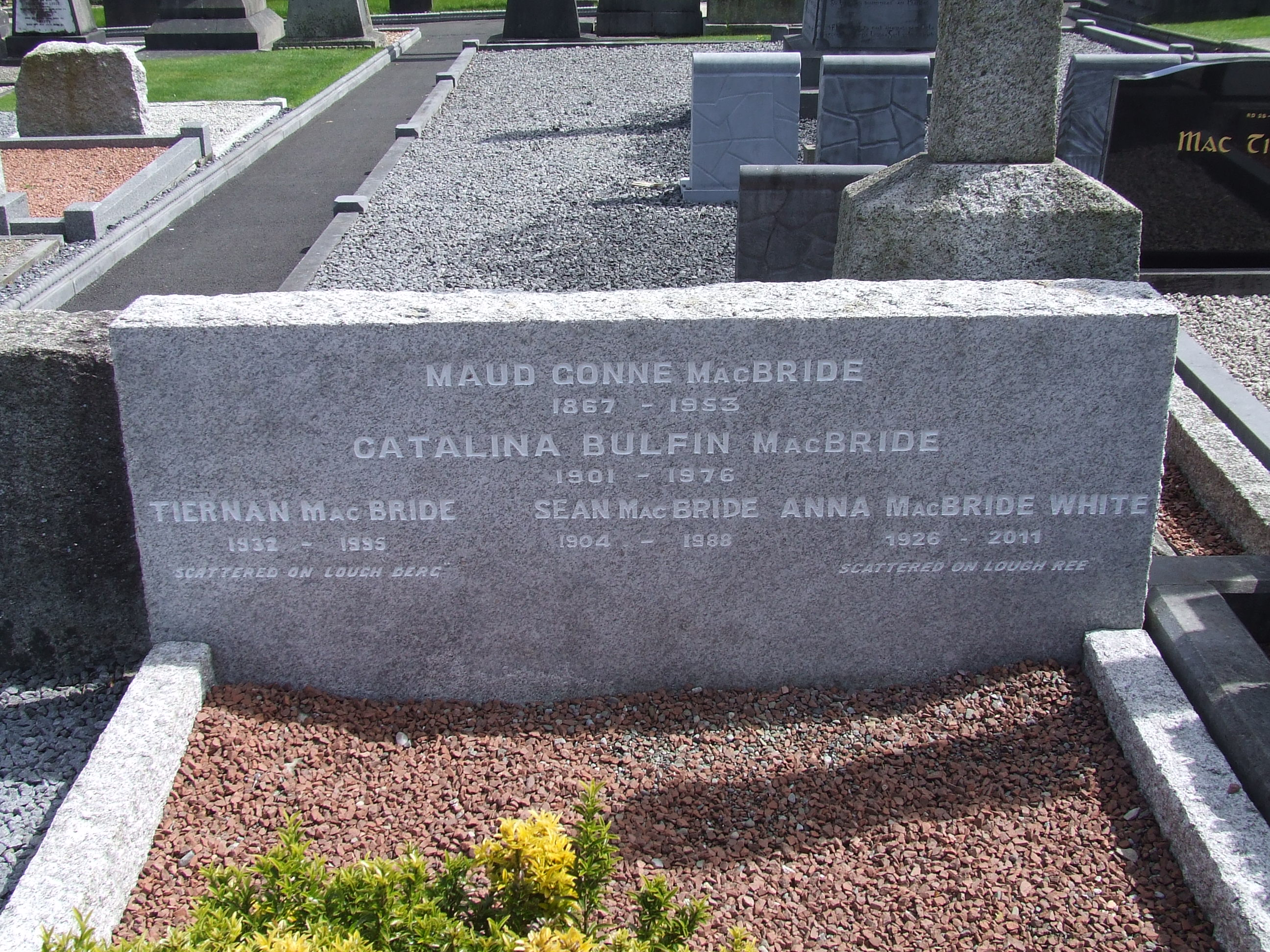
Maud Gonne's gravestone, Glasnevin Cemetery, Dublin. May 2015

Gonne was a muse for Yeats. Many of Yeats' poems are inspired by her, or mention her. He wrote the plays The Countess Cathleen and Cathleen ni Houlihan for her.

Few poets have celebrated a woman's beauty to the extent Yeats did in his lyric verse about Gonne. From his second book to Last Poems, she became the Rose, Helen of Troy (in "No Second Troy"), the Ledaean Body ("Leda and the Swan" and "Among School Children"), Cathleen Ní Houlihan, Pallas Athene and Deirdre.

Why should I blame her that she filled my days
With misery, or that she would of late
Have taught to ignorant men most violent ways
Or hurled the little streets upon the great.
(from 'No second Troy', 1916)

Yeats' 1893 poem "On a Child's Death" is thought to have been inspired by the death of Gonne's son Georges, whom Yeats thought Gonne had adopted. The poem was not published in Yeats' lifetime; scholars say he did not want the poem to be part of his canon, as it is of uneven quality.

Yeats proposed to Gonne at least four times but was rejected each time as Gonne disapproved of his lack of commitment to Irish republicanism.

== Political and social views ==
Gonne held a range of idiosyncratic views over the course of her lifetime. At the core of Maud Gonne's politics was a deep hostility to the United Kingdom and its rule in Ireland, which she regarded as a source of oppression, exploitation and moral corruption. This shaped her involvement in nationalist organisations, including her founding of Inghinidhe na hÉireann, and informed her endorsement of physical-force methods of resistance, such as assassination or bombings, which she considered morally justifiable acts of war rather than crimes. Although she described herself as "by nature and philosophy a pacifist", she justified violence against the British within an anti-imperial framework, contemplated schemes such as poisoning bailiffs or placing bombs on British troop ships, or assassinating King Edward VII, and publicly praised those who used force as defenders of the Irish nation. In practice, however, she rarely carried out personal acts of violence, intervened on occasions to prevent attacks and took steps to protect crowds at public events. She consistently regarded constitutional nationalism as inadequate, criticised Charles Stewart Parnell for repudiating violence, rejected the Fenian John O'Leary's suggestion that there were moral limits to what one might do to save a nation and explicitly encouraged targeted killings of English officials, arguing that the Phoenix Park Murders were insufficient and that every English king and every instrument of the state below him should be shot "one after the other". Politically, she associated with left-wing figures like James Connolly, Charlotte Despard and Constance Markievicz, but she avoided socialism and lacked a systematic ideology, holding instead a traditional Irish nationalism rooted in opposition to British rule.

Her politics were also influenced by her years in France and her long relationship with the Boulangist politician Lucien Millevoye. Immersed in right-wing and nationalist circles there, she absorbed ideas of plebiscitary dictatorship, national destiny and the glorification of strong leaders. She expressed admiration for authoritarian figures and believed that nations were sometimes embodied in exceptional individuals, an outlook that later allowed her to view aspects of fascist and communist regimes as preferable to British liberal democracy. In the late 1930s, she suggested that Ireland "could learn from both Stalinism and Hitlerism", though her overriding concern remained opposition to Britain rather than commitment to either ideology in full.

Gonne's exposure to French right-wing politics led her to antisemitic beliefs and masonic conspiracy theories, including conspiracy theories about Jewish control of finance and politics. During the Dreyfus affair, she rejected the pro-Dreyfus position and later recalled to Yeats that she had regarded Alfred Dreyfus as "an uninteresting Jew" whose cause was suspiciously well-funded. She aligned herself with French nationalists who opposed what they saw as Jewish and international financial influence in France. Even after Dreyfus was exonerated, she wrote that "no French institution is now safe from the domination of the agents of the synagogue". This anti-Semitism remained a feature of her outlook throughout her life, though it coexisted with her work alongside progressive figures in campaigns for labour rights, social justice and the relief of poverty.

Gonne was an advocate for women's political and social rights, founding and leading organisations such as Inghinidhe na hÉireann to promote women's education, political participation and engagement in nationalist causes, and she fought for her own rights in personal contexts such as her divorce. Her commitment to women's participation in the nationalist movement led her to promote female-led organisations, though she did not describe herself as a feminist, and her vision of women's activism was largely framed by nationalist priorities rather than broader gender equality. In addition to her organisational work, she supported the Gaelic revival, emphasising the Irish language, native arts and civic education as means to strengthen national identity and encourage popular political involvement. She also engaged in practical social-welfare efforts, assisting evicted tenants, supporting relief initiatives and promoting programmes such as free school meals to alleviate child poverty in Dublin.

By the outbreak of the Second World War in 1939, Maud Gonne expressed strong support for Nazi Germany: she maintained that Britain was Ireland's true enemy, while viewing Germany as a potential ally. Her criticism of British war aims was at times accompanied by language that excused or minimised German aggression, and she corresponded with the Deutscher Fichte-Bund seeking Nazi propaganda material. She maintained a close friendship with Dr Eduard Hempel, the German ambassador in Dublin, and his wife Evelyn, whom Gonne regularly entertained at her home at Roebuck House. Irish military intelligence monitored Gonne's activities, suspecting her of involvement in the 1940 Hermann Goertz affair, a complex episode that implicated several adult members of the Gonne–MacBride–Stuart family. Following the war, Gonne, reflecting on her wartime sympathies in a letter to her friend Ethel Mannin, wrote: "I'm not sure had I been a German after the Treaty of Versailles that I would not have become a Nazi, except for the Nazi exclusion of women". Gonne also became a founding member, along with Goertz, of the Save the German Children campaign, which sought to provide foster homes for Catholic German war orphans after the war.

== Personal life ==
Maud Gonne MacBride published her autobiography in 1938, titled A Servant of the Queen, a reference to both a vision she had of the Irish queen of old, Kathleen Ni Houlihan and an ironic title considering Gonne's Irish Nationalism and rejection of the British monarchy.

Gonne died in Clonskeagh, aged 86, and is buried in Glasnevin Cemetery, Dublin.

== Publications ==
- A Servant of the Queen Dublin, Golden Eagle Books Ltd. (ISBN 9780226302522, 1995 reprint)
