= Via Crucis (disambiguation) =

The Via Crucis (Latin for 'Way of the Cross'), or the Stations of the Cross, refers to a series of images depicting Jesus Christ on the day of his crucifixion and accompanying prayers.

Via Crucis may also refer to:

- Via Crucis to the Cruz del Campo, a Christian procession in Seville, Spain
- Via crucis (Liszt), an 1879 composition by Franz Liszt
- Via crucis (album), a 2022 album by Fabio Mengozzi
- Via Crucis, a 2011 poetry collection by David Butler
