= Brian Fallon (critic) =

Irish art critic (1933–2026)

Brian Fallon (3 May 1933 – 3 September 2026) was an Irish art critic.

== Life and career ==
Brian Fallon was born in Cootehill, County Cavan on 3 May 1933, the second son of the poet Padraic Fallon, and was educated at St Peter’s College, Wexford, and Trinity College, Dublin. He was Chief Critic of The Irish Times for 35 years and its Literary Editor for 11 years (1977 to 1988). Fallon wrote numerous books on Irish art and frequently lectured on the subject of art.

Fallon died on 3 September 2026, at the age of 93.

== Work ==
- Irish Art 1830-1990, Appletree Press.
- An Age of Innocence: Irish Culture 1930-1960, Gill & Macmillan (1998).
- "Patrick Swift and Irish Art"(1993), published in Patrick Swift: An Irish Painter in Portugal, Gandon Editions, 2001.
- Imogen Stuart, Sculptor, Four Courts Press
- Tony O'Malley, by Enrique Juncosa (Author), Caoimhin Mac Giolla Leith (Author), Catherine Marshall (Author), Brian Fallon (Author), Irish Museum of Modern Art (17 Nov 2005).
- Charles Tyrrell (Dublin: Gandon 1994).
- Martin Gale (Dublin: Gandon 1995)
- Sean McSweeney (Dublin: Gandon 1996)
- Edward McGuire (Dublin: Irish Academic Press 1991)
- The Vision of MacConglinne and Other Plays, by Padraic Fallon (Author), Brian Fallon (Editor).
- Raconteur: A Collection of Short Stories By Masters of the Art (Summer 1994) (Paperback) by John Cheever (Author), John Deane (Author), Brian Fallon (Author), David Hubbins (Author), Petter Kettle (Author), Alison Leathart (Author), Jules Lemaitre (Author), Marjorie Smith (Author), Keith Waterhouse (Author).
