= Taylor Galleries =

Contemporary art gallery in Dublin, Ireland

- Gailearaithe Taylor
- Location within Central Dublin
- Established: 1978
- Location: 16 Kildare Street, Dublin, Ireland
- Coordinates: 53°20′22″N 6°15′23″W
- Type: Contemporary art gallery
- Founder: John Taylor
- Directors: John Taylor, Patrick Taylor
- Public transit access: St Stephen's Green
- Website: taylorgalleries.ie

Taylor Galleries is a contemporary commercial art gallery in Dublin, Ireland.

== History ==
Taylor Galleries opened in July 1978 ostensibly as a continuation of the Dawson Gallery – a gallery established by Leo Smith in 1944. John Taylor – who worked with the Dawson Gallery since 1964 – continued to run the Dawson Gallery after founder Leo Smith's death in 1977, until the gallery closed in 1978. Taylor opened Taylor Galleries in its place in the same year at 6 Dawson Street.

In 1990, Taylor Galleries relocated to smaller premises at 34 Kildare Street, re-designed by the architect Ross Cahill O'Brien, before moving up the road to the current space at 16 Kildare Street in 1996. Today the gallery is managed by John Taylor and his brother Patrick Taylor.

== Description ==
Taylor Galleries exhibits and sells contemporary and twentieth-century painting, sculpture, print and works on paper by select artists, mostly Irish, who are represented by the gallery. Throughout the year it mounts a series of solo exhibitions by gallery artists and two large group shows, one in summer and one in winter, which often include work by additional invited artists. The gallery’s exhibition space is spread over two floors of a large Georgian house dating from 1759 which retains many of its original features, including its central staircase..

Taylor Galleries also represents several long-term gallery artists' estates, including those of Charles Brady, William Crozier, Conor Fallon, Micheal Farrell, T.P. Flanagan, George Potter, Colin Harrison, Nancy Wynne Jones, Louis le Brocquy, Seán McSweeney, Tony O’Malley and Patrick Scott.

In 2013, the gallery began showcasing the work of emerging and mid-career artists who did not have gallery representation in Dublin through LACUNA. Planned as an intermittent series of exhibitions curated by Sabina Mac Mahon and gallery artist David Quinn., four iterations of the project have taken place to date. It runs alongside the gallery’s main programme and embraces experimental and enquiring practices in image- and object-making

== Selected gallery artists ==
- Charles Brady
- William Crozier
- Bernadette Kiely
- Brian King
- Louis le Brocquy
- Janet Mullarney
- David Quinn
- John Shinnors
- Charles Tyrrell
