= Padraic Fallon =

Irish poet and playwright (1905–1974)

- Born: 3 January 1905; Athenry, County Galway, Ireland
- Died: 9 October 1974 (aged 69); Kent, England
- Occupations: Poet, playwright
- Spouse: Dorothea Maher
- Children: 6, including Brian, Conor and Padraic

Padraic Fallon (3 January 1905 – 9 October 1974) was an Irish poet and playwright.

== Personal life ==
Fallon was born and raised in Athenry, County Galway; his upbringing and his early impressions of the town and the surrounding landscape are intimately described in his poetry. After passing the civil service exams in 1923 he moved to Dublin to work in the Customs House. In Dublin he became part of the circle of George William Russell (Æ) who encouraged his literary ambitions and arranged for the publication of his early poetry. He formed close friendships with Seumas O'Sullivan, editor of The Dublin Magazine, the poets Austin Clarke, Robert Farren, F.R. Higgins and Patrick McDonagh, and later the novelist James Plunkett. In 1939, Fallon left Dublin to serve as a Customs official in County Wexford, living in Prospect House, near Wexford Town with his wife, Dorothea (née Maher) and his six sons, including Brian Fallon. During this time he became a close friend of the painter Tony O'Malley. Fallon retired from the Civil Service in 1963, returning to Dublin before moving to Cornwall in 1967 to live with his son, the sculptor Conor Fallon and his daughter-in-law, the artist Nancy Wynne-Jones. He and his wife returned to Ireland in 1971. He spent his last years in Kinsale. He was visiting his son Ivan Fallon in Kent at the time of his death.

== Literary and dramatic works ==
Fallon's early poetry, short stories and literary criticism were published in The Dublin Magazine and The Bell. Fallon was a regular contributor to Radio Éireann in the 1940s and 1950s, serving variously as a journalist, scriptwriter and literary critic. A number of his short stories and early dramatic pieces were broadcast by the station during the 1940s. The first of Fallon's verse plays for radio, Diarmuid and Gráinne, was broadcast by Radio Éireann in November 1950. This was followed by The Vision of Mac Conglinne (1953), Two Men with a Face (1953), The Poplar (1953), Steeple Jerkin (1954), The Wooing of Étain (1954), A Man in the Window (1955), Outpost (1955), Deirdre's King (1956), The Five Stations (1957), The Hags of Clough (1957), The Third Bachelor (1958), At the Bridge Inn (1960) and Lighting up Time (1961). Three plays adapted from Irish mythology, Diarmuid and Gráinne, The Vision of Mac Conglinne and Deirdre's King, received particular contemporary critical acclaim. The landscape, mythology and history of Ireland, interwoven with classical themes and religious symbolism, are frequent themes in his poetry and dramatic works. A number of his radio plays were later broadcast on The BBC Third Programme and, in translation, in Germany, the Netherlands, and Hungary. He is known for the plays The Seventh Step which was staged at The Globe Theatre in Dublin in 1954; and a second one, Sweet Love 'till Morn, which was staged at the Abbey Theatre in 1971. Fallon also wrote dramatic pieces for television such as A Sword of Steel (1966) and The Fenians (1967), the latter produced by James Plunkett. In a number of his plays and radio dramas he cooperated with contemporary composers providing incidental music, an example being The Wooing of Étain (1954) with music by Brian Boydell (The Wooing of Étain, Op. 37).

== Published works ==
While his poetry had previously appeared in The Dublin Magazine, The Bell, The Irish Times and a number of anthologies, his first volume of collected poetry, Poems, incorporating a number of previously unpublished poems, was not produced until 1974, months before his death. Three volumes of his poetry, edited by his son, the journalist and critic Brian Fallon, were published after his death: Poems and Versions in 1983, Collected Poems (with an introduction by Seamus Heaney), in 1990, and A Look in the Mirror and Other Poems (with an introduction by Eavan Boland) in 2003. In 2005, three of Fallon's verse plays, The Vision of Mac Conglinne, The Poplar , and The Hags of Clough, were published in a single volume. A selection of his prose writings and criticism edited by Brian Fallon: A Poet's Journal, was published in the same year.

== Bibliography ==
- A Poet's Journal Lilliput Press (2005) ISBN 978-1-84351-074-1
- The Vision of Mac Conglinne and Other Plays Carcanet (2005) ISBN 1-85754-663-6
- 'A Look in the Mirror' and Other Poems Carcanet (2003) ISBN 1-85754-642-3
- Collected Poems Carcanet (1990) ISBN 978-1-85235-052-9
- Poems and Versions Carcanet (1983) ISBN 0-85635-431-7
- Poems Dolmen Press (1974) ISBN 0-85105-235-5
