= Conor Fallon =

Irish sculptor

Conor Hubert Fallon RHA
- Conor Fallon
- Born: Conor Fallon; 30 January 1939; Dublin, Ireland
- Died: 3 October 2007 (aged 68); County Wicklow, Ireland
- Known for: Sculpture
- Notable work: Singing Bird, at Enniscorthy bridge in Co Wexford

Conor Fallon RHA (30 January 1939 – 3 October 2007) was a leading Irish sculptor.

== Life ==
Conor Hubert Fallon was born in Dublin to Padraic Fallon the Irish poet and playwright and Dorothea Maher. The family moved to Clonard, County Wexford where Fallon grew up. He had three surviving brothers, Brian, Ivan and Padraic who have all had journalism careers, though he was the third of six sons. Fallon was educated in St. Peter's College, Wexford. Fallon began painting in 1957 in Trinity College Dublin where he was studying natural science however there he was advised to pay more attention to his art. As a compromise with his father who didn't see his talent he also studied accountancy at night. Friends with Tony O'Malley Fallon spent time in St Ives, Cornwall where he met his wife Nancy Wynne-Jones. Fallon married Wynne-Jones in 1966. They adopted 2 children in 1970, siblings John and Bridget, and moved to Kinsale in 1972. In 1987 the family moved again to Rathdrum, County Wicklow. Fallon died of cancer in 2007 a year after his wife.

== Career ==
Fallon initially studied painting under Richard Kingston but was encouraged to take up sculpture. Denis Mitchell became his mentor in Cornwall and with Breon O'Casey he developed his sculpting. He became notable for this cast steel and bronze work, especially birds, horses and hares. He was a regular exhibitor in the Taylor Galleries. In 1980 Fallon was awarded the Oireachtas gold medal for sculpture. He became an honorary associate of the National College of Art and Design in 1993. He was secretary of the Royal Hibernian Academy, becoming a full member in 1989, and on the board of the National Gallery of Ireland. Fallon was also a member of Aosdána.

== See also ==
- List of public art in Cork city
