= David Quinn =

David Quinn may refer to:

- David Quinn (actor), American actor who became a teacher and co-founder of Allrecipes
- David Quinn (artist, born 1970), Irish artist
- David Quinn (bird artist) (born 1959), British bird artist
- David Quinn (columnist), Irish commentator on religious and social affairs
- David Quinn (ice hockey) (born 1966), ice hockey coach and former player
- David Quinn (visual artist) (born 1971), Irish artist and painter
- David Quinn (writer), American writer of comics
- David Beers Quinn (1909–2002), Irish historian
