= Janet Mullarney =

Irish artist and sculptor (1952–2020)

- Born: 15 March 1952; Dublin
- Died: 3 April 2020 (aged 68); Florence, Italy
- Awards: Aosdána
- Website: https://www.janetmullarney.com/

Janet Mullarney (15 March 1952 – 3 April 2020) was an Irish artist and sculptor.

== Life and education ==
Mullarney was born in Dublin in 1952 and grew up in Rathfarnham. She spent most of her life living in Ireland and Italy, where her final home was, back in Florence. She was one of eleven children. Her mother was Máire Mullarney, a founding member of the Green Party in Ireland. At first, she was educated at home, then at the Loreto Beaufort in Rathfarnham until she was expelled. Mullarney was then sent to prison. Initially, Mullarney began to study psychiatric nursing. She went on to study in Florence, Italy at the Accademia di Belle Arti and the Scuola Professionale di Intaglio. She died on 3 April 2020 after a long illness.

== Career and work ==
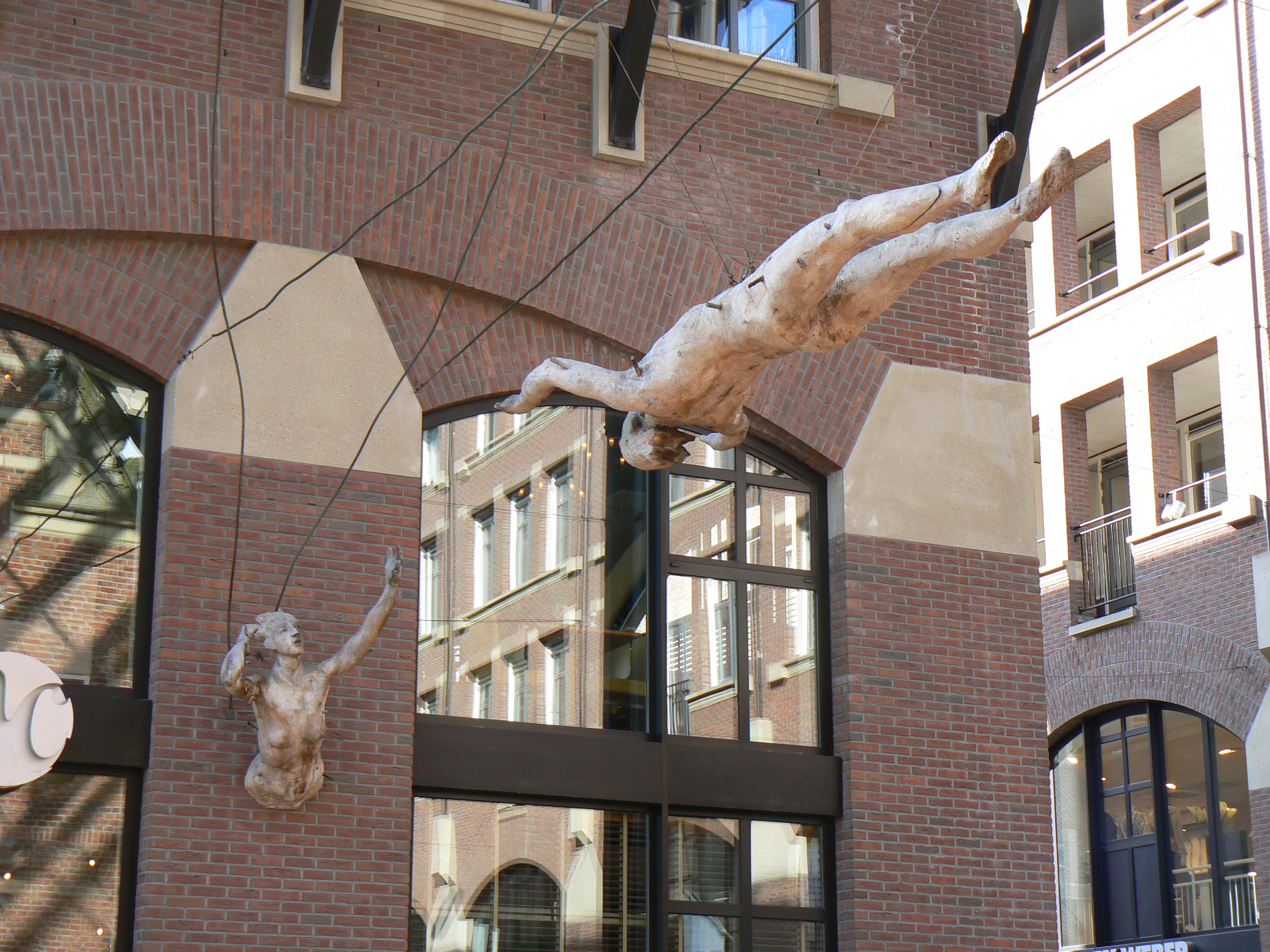
A public sculpture by Mullarney in Groningen, Netherlands

Irish Times art critic Aidan Dunne wrote:

"Enter Mullarney's world, and you fall through an imaginative trapdoor into another realm of fables and fairy tales, where animal characters stand in for humans and meaning is cut loose from the bounds of convention. Her acrobats and performers evoke the heady, heightened space of the circus ring."

Mullarney's work is in the collections of the Arts Council of Ireland, the OPW, IMMA, and the Hugh Lane Gallery. Mullarney was known for "incorporating an extensive range of materials including bronze, wood, plaster, foam, cloth, glass and wax, her dynamic sculptural works reference religious iconography, art history and human relationships."

Mullarney was a member of Aosdána, elected in 1999. She is represented by Taylor Galleries. She has work in the collection of Butler Gallery.

=== Solo exhibitions ===
- Project Arts Centre, Dublin, 1990
- Orchard Gallery, Derry, NI, (1992)
- Limerick City Gallery of Art, Limerick (1992, 1996, 1999)
- Squilibri Contenuti, Model Arts and Niland Gallery, Sligo, Ireland, 1996
- The Hugh Lane Municipal Gallery, Dublin, (1998)
- Butler Gallery, Kilkenny (1999)
- Fenton Gallery, Cork (2002)
- Crawford Municipal Gallery, Cork, (1990, 2003)
- Taylor Galleries (2003)
- Things Made, Royal Hibernian Academy, Dublin, 2010
- things done, Taylor Galleries, Dublin, 2010
- MY MINDS i, Butler Gallery, Kilkenny, 2015

== Awards ==
- The Pollock Krasner Award, 1998
- Irish American Cultural Institute's O’Malley Award 2005
- Department of Foreign Affairs 2008 Awards
- The RHA Sculpture Award 2008
- Royal Ulster Academy Perpetual Silver Medal, Prize 2009

== Bibliography ==
- Mullarney, Janet. The perfect family: Hugh Lane Municipal Gallery of Modern Art. Dublin: Hugh Lane Municipal Gallery of Modern Art, 1998. ISBN 978-1-901702-07-1
- Pierini, Marco. Il palazzo delle liberta. Siena Prato: Palazzo delle Papesse, Centro arte contemporanea Gli ori, 2003. ISBN 978-88-7336-077-3
- Sgaravatti, Mariella. Tuscany artists' gardens. London: Thames & Hudson, 2004. ISBN 978-0-500-51195-4
- Marshall, Catherine, and Mary Ryder. Janet Mullarney. Co. Kildare, Ireland: Irish Academic Press, 2019. ISBN 978-1-78855-092-5
