= Saoi =

Highest honour for a member of Aosdána

Saoi (Irish pronunciation: [sˠiː], plural Saoithe; literally "wise one"; historically the title of the head of a bardic school) is the highest honour bestowed by Aosdána, a state-supported association of Irish creative artists. The title is awarded, for life, to an existing Aosdána member. There are at most seven living Saoithe at any time; a limit increased from five in 2007–08. At the conferring ceremony, a torc (a twist/spiral of gold, worn around the neck) is presented to the Saoi, typically by the President of Ireland.

== Nominating process ==
A committee of ten members of Aosdána referred to as the Toscaireacht monitor and manage the nominating process to confirm adherence to the established rules. Fifteen members of the Aosdána must nominate a candidate of merit and distinction. An election by secret ballot then occurs with all members. Approval is determined by at least 50% + 1 of the membership voting approval.

Only one nomination per vacancy may be processed through an election at a time. If multiple candidate submissions are received, they go through the election process one at a time until a successful approval is declared. Subsequent nominees are held until there is a future vacancy.

== List ==
Saoithe of Aosdána
Name	Field (Note: The fields of choreography and architecture have not produced any Saoithe.)	Elected	Invested	Died	Refs
Samuel Beckett	Literature	October 1984	1985 (in absentia)	1989	
Seán Ó Faoláin	Literature	1986	1986	1991	
Patrick Collins	Visual arts	1987	1987	1994	
Mary Lavin	Literature	1992	1993	1996	
Louis le Brocquy	Visual arts	1992	1993	2012	
Tony O'Malley	Visual arts	1993	1993	2003	
Benedict Kiely	Literature	March 1996	1996	2007	
Francis Stuart	Literature	October 1996	1996	2000	
Seamus Heaney	Literature	1997	1998	2013	
Anthony Cronin	Literature	March 2003	27 June 2003	2016	
Brian Friel	Literature	2006	2006	2015	
Patrick Scott	Visual arts	28 March 2007	11 July 2007	2014	
Camille Souter	Visual arts	9 May 2008	24 November 2008	2023	
Seóirse Bodley	Music	September 2008	24 November 2008	2023	
William Trevor	Literature	29 September 2014	2015	2016	
Edna O'Brien	Literature	2015	15 September 2015	2024	
Imogen Stuart	Visual arts	2015	15 September 2015	2024	
George Morrison	Visual arts (Note: Morrison is a filmmaker; there being no specific category for "film", he is classed by Aosdána under "visual arts".)	2016	9 March 2017	2025	
Tom Murphy	Literature	2017	2017	2018	
Roger Doyle	Music	2019	2019	living	
Eiléan Ní Chuilleanáin	Literature		2022	living	
Paul Muldoon	Literature		2025	living	
Dorothy Cross	Visual arts		2025	living	
