= Máire Mullarney =

Irish activist

Máire Mullarney (1 September 1921 – 18 August 2008) was an Irish environmentalist, educationalist and Esperanto advocate. She was one of the founding members of the Irish Green Party in 1981 (then known as the Ecology Party of Ireland). She stood for the party in three Dáil elections in the 1980s and was elected to South Dublin County Council in 1991, a position she kept until 1999.

Her political influences included Hilaire Belloc, GK Chesterton and Ernst Schumacher, author of the influential Small Is Beautiful: A Study of Economics As If People Mattered, which argued for environmentalism from an economist's perspective.

Maire Mullarney also published a book called "Anything school can do you can do better" it was about her raising her children as well as home educating. One of her daughters was Janet Mullarney, artist and sculptor. Her son is Killian Mullarney author and illustrator of Collins Guide to the Birds of Europe.
