= Butler Gallery =

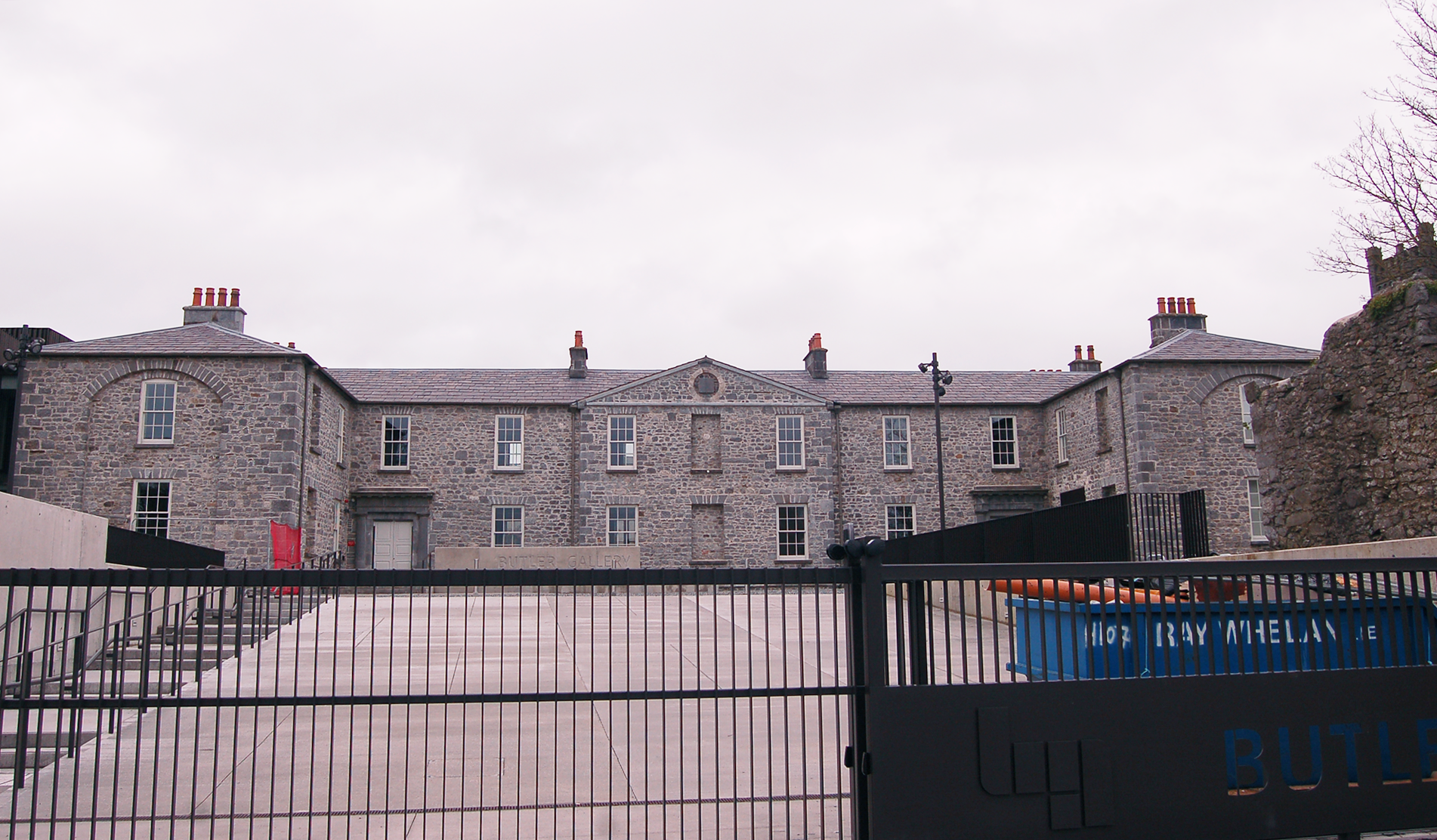
- Butler Gallery is located in Evans' Home

- Location within Ireland
- Established: 1943
- Location: Evans' Home, John's Quay, Kilkenny, Ireland
- Coordinates: 52.6538°N 7.2492°W
- Type: Art gallery, museum
- Director: Anna O'Sullivan
- Website: butlergallery.ie

Butler Gallery is a contemporary art gallery and museum in Kilkenny, Ireland. It presents a collection of works by Irish and international artists from the 18th century to the present day. A wing has been devoted to the work of the Callan artist Tony O'Malley and his wife Jane.

Established in Kilkenny city in 1943 by George Pennefather, the Butler Gallery is named in honor of Susan (Peggy) and Hubert Butler. The gallery, previously based in the basement of Kilkenny Castle, is located in the redeveloped Evans' Home, a former almshouse built in the 19th century for impoverished domestic servants.
