= Dermot Seymour =

Irish artist (born 1956)

Dermot Seymour RUA
- Born: 1956 (age 69–70); Belfast, County Antrim
- Education: Ulster Polytechnic
- Alma mater: Ulster Polytechnic
- Known for: Landscapes, animals, people
- Style: Social Realism
- Spouse: Alice Maher

Dermot Seymour RUA (b.1956) is a Northern Irish painter, an elected member of Aosdána and an Academician of the Royal Ulster Academy of Arts. His work explores a variety of themes relating to conflict, symbolism, and identity in Northern Ireland.

== Life & work ==
Dermot Seymour was born and raised on the lower Shankill Road in Belfast. Seymour studied graphic design at the Ulster Polytechnic between 1975–78, where he was to return in 1981 attaining an Advanced Diploma in Art and Design.

Seymour's work is a reaction to growing up at the height of The Troubles. He juxtaposes idyllic landscapes with a host of other elements, ranging from farm animals to military helicopters, exploring symbolism, and identity to show the absurdities inherent in the Northern Irish society. In doing so, he exposes the tensions between militarization and the ordinary rural and urban communities. In a 2007 interview with The Sunday Times, Seymour said of his work,

"...in the North, an object is never simply an object: it carries additional territorial significance. So, for instance, in the North, if you see a cow it isn't simply a cow. You ask: whose cow is that? It becomes a tribal symbol."

Seymour's hyper-real paintings are satirical and often described wrongly as 'Surrealist'. In a 1997 interview with Ian Wieczorek, he rejected this labelling by saying:

"Dali or Magritte or anyone like that wouldn't really come into my head at all. I think a lot of those Surrealists were deliberately surreal, they were contriving things. I was busy playing around with things that were actually there in front of me, in the world that was around me."

As a student in 1978, Seymour and Terence Murphy painted a community mural in the Highfields Estate in Belfast on the side of a high-rise building. The painting was commissioned as part of the Belfast Community Arts Project '78 with the subjects being members of a local boxing club. In 1981 he showed his first solo exhibition at the Art and Research Exchange, Belfast in an exhibition entitled Northern Images. He had previously shown in that same space in a group show of1978. In 1982, Seymour showed at the Octagon Gallery in a joint exhibition with Leslie Stannage.

Theatre Ireland commissioned Seymour to illustrate two scripts and two consecutive covers for their double souvenir issues published in June 1984. His first Dublin show came a few months later when he joined another Ulster born artist Liam Magee at the Project Arts Centre, in an exhibition called Two Tribes. Seymour relocated to Dublin in 1985 and two years later he moved to Annaghmakerrig, County Monaghan. The critic Dorothy Walker selected Seymour's work for inclusion in the 1986 Guinness Peat Aviation Exhibition and Awards for emerging young artists. He was selected alongside fellow Ulster artists John Kindness and Willie Doherty, but he was not amongst the prizewinners on this occasion. Seymour showed at the annual Oireachtas show in the same year. The Paula Allen Gallery in New York was the venue for Seymour's first transatlantic one-man show in 1987, where he was to exhibit for a further two consecutive years. Seymour received the patronage of The Arts Council of Northern Ireland once more when they hosted a solo exhibition in their Bedford Street gallery in 1989.

Throughout the nineties Seymour showed frequently at venues across Ireland including solo shows at the Project Arts Centre, Dublin and the Linenhall Arts Centre, Castlebar in 1992, and a joint exhibition with Micky Donnelly at the Fenderesky Gallery in Belfast, 1996.

After the turn of the century, Seymour completed a number of portraits depicting politicians and sportsmen, such as Brian Cowen, Pat Rabbite, and Roy Keane. All show a world-weariness and sensitivity and each portrait focuses on the eyes, with the exception of his depiction of a loyalist paramilitary which focuses on his reflective sunglasses hiding his eyes. More recently, Seymour has shown works exploring the effects of contemporary issues on Ireland: Brexit, in the 2017 exhibition Hidden dips, Blind summits – The road to Brexitaria and also the Covid crisis, in the 2020 show entitled A Covid border tangle.

== Awards ==
The Arts Council of Northern Ireland awarded Seymour a bursary of £400 to purchase photographic equipment in 1983. Since then, he has received awards from many institutions including the Claremorris Open Exhibition, An Chomhairle Ealaíon and from the Government of Ireland's Department of Foreign Affairs. In 1987, he received a joint award from the Arts Council of Northern Ireland and the Ireland-America Arts Exchange of a PS1 international studio fellowship which took him to New York for six months. The artist received a further Arts Council of Northern Ireland bursary in 1993. Seymour won a Marten Toonder Award in 1996. Seymour's peers elected him to become a member of Aosdána in 1997 along with seven others, including the fellow Northerner and poet Ciaran Carson, and the Limerick artist John Shinnors.

== Legacy ==
Seymour's work can be found in many private and public collections including those of the Royal Ulster Academy, European Central Bank, Ulster Museum, Arts Council of Northern Ireland, University of Ulster and the Irish Museum of Modern Art.

Seymour has been represented by the Kevin Kavanagh Gallery for a number of years. He continues to live and work in rural County Mayo where he has resided since 1990.
