= John Shinnors =

Irish artist (born 1950)

- Born: 18 April 1950 (age 76); Limerick City
- Education: Limerick School of Art & Design
- Known for: Painting
- Style: Abstract
- Elected: Aosdána (1997)

John Shinnors is an Irish landscape artist whose work has become increasingly abstract over time. He is a member of Aosdána and sits as the visual arts representative on EV+A.

== Life and work ==
John Shinnors was the son of a handyman-mechanic born in Limerick on 14 April 1950. He received a general education at the Christian Brothers School in Limerick City. As a teenager, he amused himself by drawing and later enrolling in an art class at Limerick School of Art & Design. The class was just one night per week but he soon lost interest and dropped out. Shinnors then took himself to London for a time where he did a number of menial jobs and attended Hornsey Art School on a part-time basis, before returning home in 1969. He then returned full-time to Limerick School of Art & Design under the influence of Jack Donovan where remained until 1972. Shinnors left the college to explore his own direction in art. He is considered a maverick on the Irish art scene.

Shinnors is an abstract painter who has built up a solid and recurring set of visual motifs that include scarecrows, lighthouses, cows and boats. Shinnors taught part-time at his alma mater whilst he established his practice. His earliest works were shown in a small network of local independent galleries, in factories and in the open air. His first success came in 1984 when he was awarded the Royal Hibernian Association's Guinness Peat Aviation Emerging Artists Award, where Tony Ryan was to become one of his earliest patrons. Amongst his influences can be counted Jack Donovan, Georges de la Tour, James McNeill Whistler and Caravaggio.

Shinnors has been a frequent exhibitor with the Royal Hibernian Academy, and also with the Oireachtas where he debuted in 1977.

In 1987 he was inducted into the National Self-Portrait Collection of Ireland with fourteen other artists including Deborah Brown, Michael Ginnett, Anne Madden and Raymond Piper. In the same year Shinnors joined with his mentor Jack Donovan and Henry Morgan in showing at the Limerick City Gallery of Art. His peers elected him to the membership of Aosdána in 1997 at the same time as fellow Limerick artist Samuel Walsh and Ulster artist Dermot Seymour.

"Shinnors [...] environment continuously feeds his visual world and presents opportunities for paintings. His work may include other personal narratives and concerns that enter the paintings but ultimately it's the pigment, the brush and the canvas that carry the only significance for him."

Shinnors was seriously injured when he sustained two broken legs in a traffic accident in 2014. Shinnors recent work at the Gallery of Modern Art, Waterford shows a departure from his limited palette of dark tones and a move towards a more colourful and vibrant set.

== Legacy ==
He partnered with the Limerick Institute of Technology, Limerick School of Art & Design and Limerick City Gallery of Art to found the Shinnors Scholarship for an MA in Curatorial Studies in 2005. The Award allows the recipient to study at Limerick School of Art & Design whilst basing the artist at Limerick City Gallery of Art. The poet John Montague wrote a poem, Scarecrow, dedicated to the artist which was inspired by the well-used Shinnors motif. John Liddy also immortalised Shinnor's work in his poem entitled Three Paintings by John Shinnors, as has Aosdána poet Theo Dorgan in Three Heterodox Sonnets for John Shinnors. Pat Boran took inspiration from Shinnors' Lighthouse 1 to produce a haiku by the same name. Michael Garvey directed a documentary on Shinnor's work, Split Image –John Shinnors, for RTÉ in 1997. Shinnors is married to his wife Catherine with whom he has two sons. He continues to live and work in Limerick City and has been represented by the Taylor Galleries, Dublin for many years. He is a patron of the Irish Chamber Orchestra.

Shinnor's work is held in many private and public collections including An Chomhairle Ealaíon, Bank of Ireland, Ulster Museum, National Self-Portrait Collection of Ireland, Irish Museum of Modern Art and the Royal Hibernian Academy.
