= Seán McSweeney =

Irish painter (1935–2018)

- Born: December 17, 1935; Dublin, Ireland
- Died: 2 June 2018 (aged 82); Ireland
- Burial place: St. Kevin's Cemetery, Hollywood, County Wicklow
- Known for: Landscape painting
- Spouse: Sheila Murphy (m. 1967–2018)
- Children: 5
- Elected: Aosdána (1984)

Seán McSweeney HRHA (17 December 1935 – 2 June 2018) was an Irish painter and member of the arts organisation Aosdána.

== Early life ==
McSweeney was born in Dublin in 1935. He worked for a time as a clerk, and became interested in art due to his father, also an artist, and because of visits to the Hugh Lane Gallery.

== Career ==
McSweeney was self-taught as a painter, living in County Wicklow for a time before moving to his mother's home (Ballyconnell, northern County Sligo) in the 1980s. He was inspired by painters like Patrick Collins and Jack B. Yeats.

He first exhibitied his work at the Cavendish Gallery, Dublin in the late 1950s; he was featured in the first Irish Exhibition of Living Art in 1962. His first solo show was at the Dawson Gallery in 1965. He had a retrospective show at The Model, Sligo in 2007.

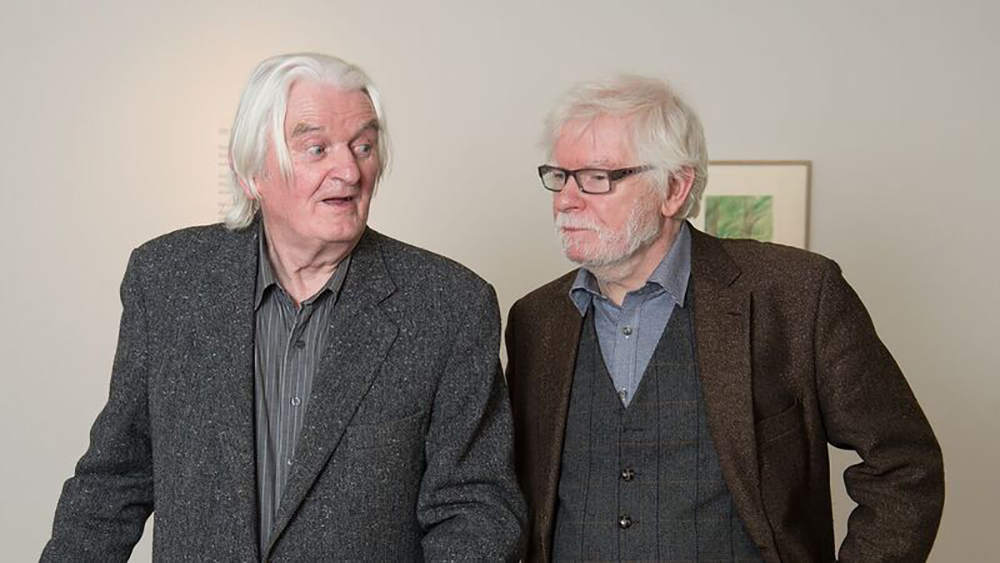
McSweeney (right) with poet Gerard Smyth, 2017

According to the Kenny Gallery, "his bog pools and Sligo landscapes are iconic in Irish painting. Vibrant primaries mingle with dense blacks to suggest an almost primal depth."

According to the Taylor Galleries, McSweeney was

Consistently drawn to the characteristic "horizontality" of the bogland, sea fields and flat expanses of shoreline that surrounded his home near the coast, he returned repeatedly to the same subjects, painting them in various lights and through the changing seasons. The resulting paintings, drawings and prints verge on abstraction: bog pools are reduced to rectangular shapes bordered by grasses and plants, while coastlines are represented by bands of colour that demarcate the boundaries between land, sea and sky.

== Personal life ==
McSweeney married Sheila Murphy in 1967; they had five children. He died in 2018.
