= David Quinn (visual artist) =

Irish artist

- Born: 1971 (age 54–55); Dublin, Ireland
- Known for: Painting

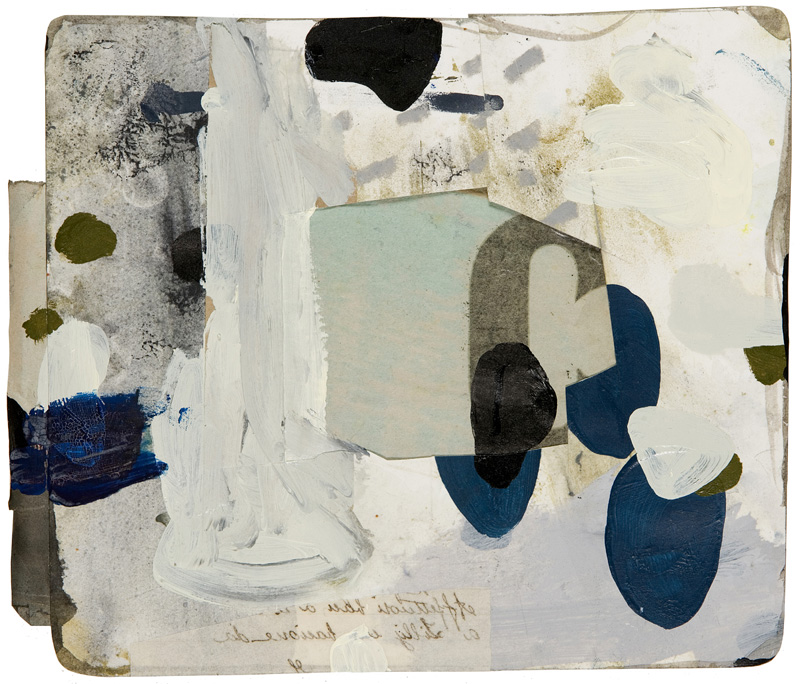
Flux by Quinn

David Quinn (born 1971 in Dublin) is a painter and contemporary Irish artist.

== Career ==
Quinn studied Visual Communications at Dublin Institute of Technology (DIT) from 1989 to 1993. Quinn has been exhibiting regularly with the Taylor Galleries, Dublin since 2004. His work is included in the collections of Electric Ireland, Bank of Ireland, Office of Public Works, Eaton Corporation, AIB Corporate Banking and the Morrison Hotel, Dublin. In 2015 he was the recipient of the Tony O'Malley Studio Residency Award.

He has had solo exhibitions in Dublin, Belfast, Sydney, London, Brussels and Tokyo.
