= Padraic Fallon (journalist) =

Irish journalist and author

Padraic Fallon (21 September 1946 - 14 October 2012) was an Irish journalist and the youngest son of poet and playwright, Padraic Fallon (1905–1974).

== Biography ==
Fallon was born on 21 September 1946 in Wexford, Ireland. He completed his early education from St Peter's College, Wexford, and Blackrock College in Dublin. Later, he attended Trinity College Dublin, where he studied business.

Fallon started his career at The Irish Times. Later, in 1969, he moved to London to work at Thomson Regional Newspapers, then at the Daily Mirror, and subsequently joined the Daily Mail.

In 1974, Fallon became the editor of Euromoney. Later in his career, he held various leadership roles at Euromoney, including managing director, chief executive, and chairman. Additionally, he served on the board of the Daily Mail & General Trust and was a director of Allied Irish Banks from 1998 to 2007, resigning due to concerns about the banks' lending policies.

Fallon was also an author, having written novels such as Hymn of the Dawn, which drew from his childhood experiences in Wexford.

== Bibliography ==
- A Hymn of the Dawn (2003)
- The Circles of Archimedes (2010)
