= David Butler (author) =

Irish novelist, short story writer, playwright and poet

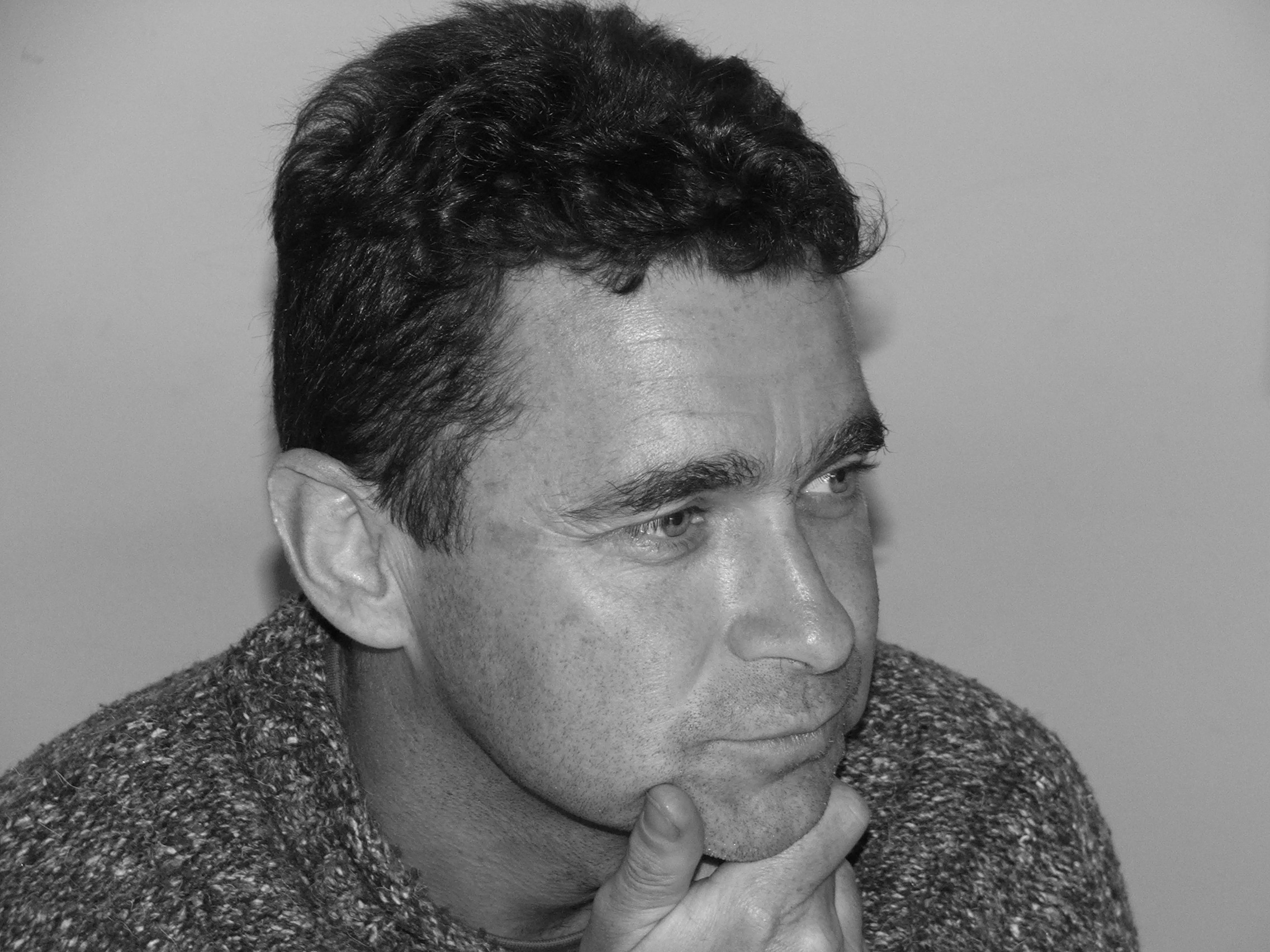
- Born: 1 January 1964 (age 62); Dublin, Ireland
- Education: University College Dublin
- Occupations: Writer, lecturer, playwright, poet
- Writing career
- Language: English, Spanish, Portuguese, French, Russian, Irish
- Period: Late 20th century - Early 21st century
- Genres: Novel, Short Story, Play, Poetry
- Subject: Life in the margins
- Notable works: The Judas Kiss; Via Crucis; Selected Poems of Fernando Pessoa; The Last European

David Butler (born 1 January 1964) is an Irish novelist, short story writer, playwright, poet and actor. He has won several literary prizes, such as the Ted McNulty Award from Poetry Ireland and the Féile Filíochta International Award and the Fish Short Story Award.

== Reception ==
Butler's work has been generally well received by critics, with a reviewer for the Sunday Times describing the main character of The Judas Kiss as being "among the more outlandishly repulsive creations of recent Irish fiction." Author Pat McCabe wrote of City of Dis, which was shortlisted for the Kerry Group Irish Novel of the Year 2015, “David Butler's compelling mythic, metaphysical X-ray is beautifully written and ought to cement his already growing reputation.” while for the Kirkus Review, the award-winning novel is “A dark romp featuring delightfully crackling dialogue and the mental gymnastics of a protagonist so on edge he tries to silence a yowling cat with poison.”

== Awards and honours ==
- 2001: Poetry Ireland's Ted McNulty Prize
- 2002: Brendan Kennelly Award
- 2004: Poetry Ireland Féile Filíochta International Poetry Festival
- 2013: SCDA ‘Play on Words’ One Act Drama Award
- 2014: Fish Short Story Award
- 2015: Cork Arts Theatre Writers’ Award
- 2016: ITT/Redline Short Story Award
- 2020: Maria Edgeworth Poetry Award
- 2021: Benedict Kiely Short Story Award
- 2022: Colm Toibin Short Story Award
- 2023: ChipLit Fest Short Story Award

Two-times winner of the Maria Edgeworth Short Story Award

== Bibliography ==
=== Fiction ===
- The Last European (2005) novel
- The Judas Kiss (2012) novel
- No Greater Love (2013) short stories
- City of Dis (2014) novel
- Fugitive (2021) short stories
- Prague 1938 (2021) novel under pen-name Dara Kavanagh
- Jabberwock (2023) novel under pen-name Dara Kavanagh
- White Spirits (2025) short stories
- Scorched Earth (2025) novel under pen-name Dara Kavanagh

=== Poetry ===
- Selected Poems: Fernando Pessoa (2004)
- Via Crucis (2011)
- All the Barbaric Glass (2017)
- Liffey Sequence (2021)

=== Non-Fiction ===
- An Aid to Reading Ulysses (2004)
- Joyce / Pessoa: The Mirror and the Mask (2004)
