= Nancy Wynne-Jones =

Irish artist (1922–2006)

Nancy Wynne-Jones HRHA
- Nancy Wynne-Jones
- Born: Nancy Wynne-Jones; 10 December 1922; Penmaenucha, Dolgellau, Wales
- Died: 9 November 2006 (aged 83); County Wicklow, Ireland
- Known for: Abstract landscapes

Nancy Wynne-Jones HRHA (10 December 1922 – 9 November 2006) was a Welsh and Irish artist.

== Life ==
Mary Esperance ("Nancy") Wynne-Jones was born in December 1922 in Penmaenucha in Wales to landowner Charles Llewellyn Wynne-Jones and Sybil Mary Gella Scott. The family spent half the year in Wales and half the year in Thornhill, Stalbridge, Dorset. She had two brothers, Andrew and Ronald ("Polly") both of whom died in Africa during World War II.

Wynne-Jones was educated at home. Her skill in art led to her getting lessons in Sherborne from a children's book illustrator. Her music was encouraged by the family doctor and she began to compose and study the violin, receiving lessons in Bournemouth with the first violinist of the symphony orchestra. After the start of the Second World War, she continued in Aberystwyth. Wynne-Jones went on to study the violin and composition at the Royal Academy of Music, London (1940–43). While in London she also served as a Voluntary Aid Detachment nurse until 1943 and later as a draughtswoman at the Ordnance Survey.

After the War Wynne-Jones purchased and managed a bookshop on the King's Road in Chelsea, but it was not a financial success. She returned to painting, studying at the Heatherley School of Fine Art, London from 1951 to 1952 and the Chelsea School of Art from 1952–1955. She travelled extensively through Portugal and Italy painting landscapes. An interest in completing landscapes in an abstract manner led her to study with Peter Lanyon in St Ives, Cornwall.

Wynne-Jones began study in Cornwall in 1957 and remained there for fifteen years. Her first public exhibition was in a group show (1957) at the Pasmore Edwards Gallery, Newlyn. Other group shows were Jefferson Place Gallery, Washington, DC, USA (1959), and in Falmouth, Cornwall (1960). Her solo exhibitions were at the New Vision Centre, London (1962) and (1965), Florence (1963) and Dolgellau (1964). From the 1960s through the 1990s she exhibited in Britain, Italy, Belgium, Germany, Ireland, Spain, Holland, South Africa, and the USA.

In 1962 Wynne-Jones bought Trevaylor House near Penzance and provided accommodation for other artists including renowned Irish painter Tony O'Malley, sculptor Conor Fallon and English poet and writer W. S. 'Sydney' Graham. In the 1970s she exhibited in Ireland; at the Project Arts Centre, Dublin (1970) and at the Emmet Gallery, Dublin (1975 and 1977). During the 1980s Wynne-Jones exhibited at the Lincoln and Hendricks galleries in Dublin; before joining the Taylor Gallery, run by John and Patrick Taylor. She was elected an honorary member of the RHA in 1994 and became a member of Aosdána in 1996. Originally an abstract artist, her contact with the Irish countryside slowly transformed her work to that of a landscape artist, albeit with an influence of abstraction attached to it. She became well-known in Irish art circles as an eminent Irish landscape artist.

== Personal life ==
Wynne-Jones had been involved with artist Derek Middleton before moving to Cornwall. There she had become romantically involved with Graham who was in an open marriage, however, it was the death of her mentor Lanyon which devastated her. She met the sculptor Fallon through their mutual friend O'Malley. Fallon had arrived in Cornwall ostensibly to meet Lanyon. They married in 1966. Their honeymoon in Provance was immortalised in expressionist paintings done by Wynne-Jones. The couple adopted a boy and a girl, siblings, John and Bridget. In 1972 she moved with her family to Kinsale, County Cork. It was in the area around here that a number of her paintings were created. Later she painted the mountain visible from her Wicklow home after the family moved in the late 1980s. She moved to Ballard House, near Rathdrum, County Wicklow in 1987. She died in 2006 and was buried in Ballinatone (Church of Ireland), Rathdrum.
