= Via Crucis to the Cruz del Campo =

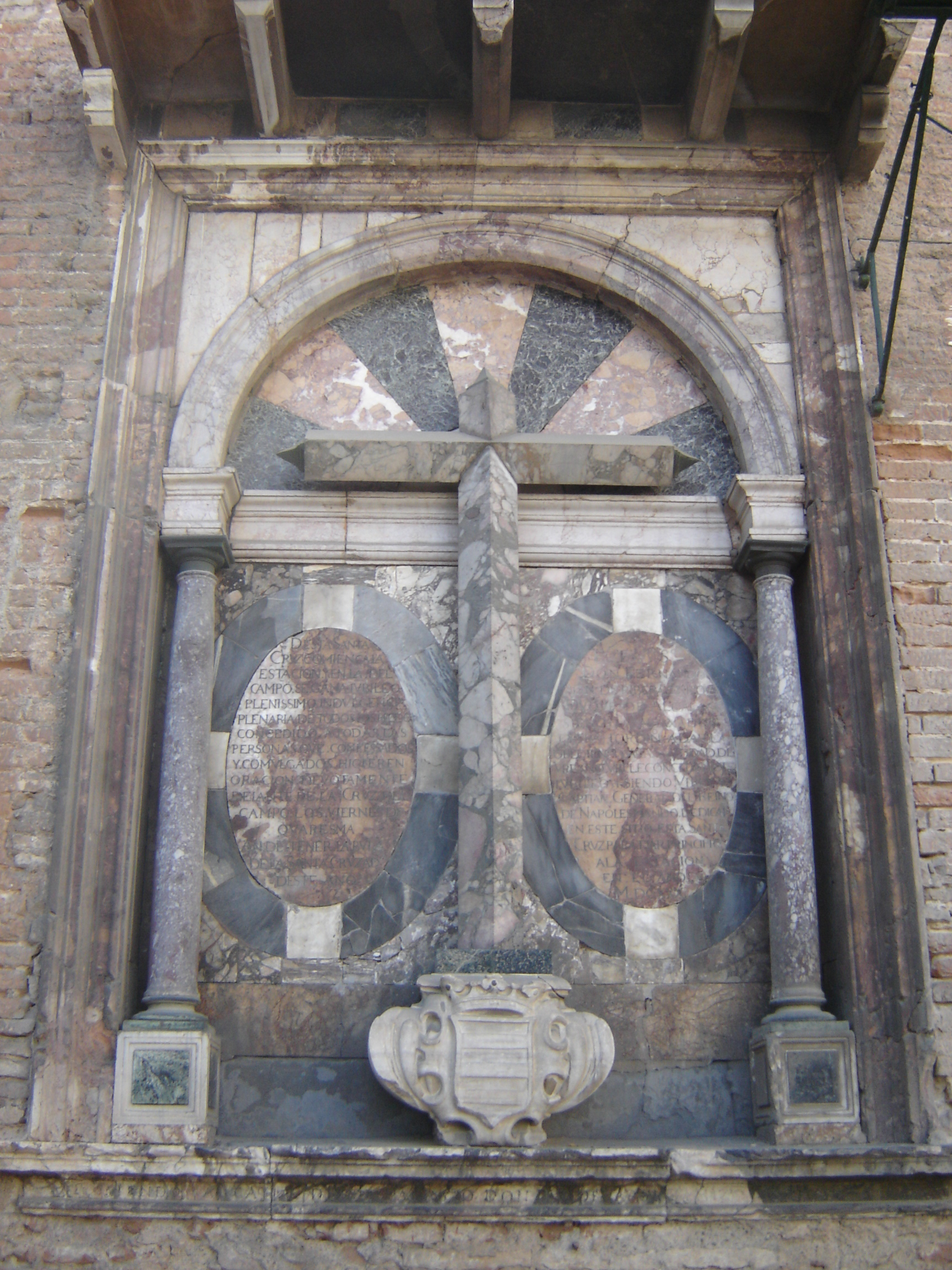
Beginning of the Via Crucis to the Cruz del Campo.

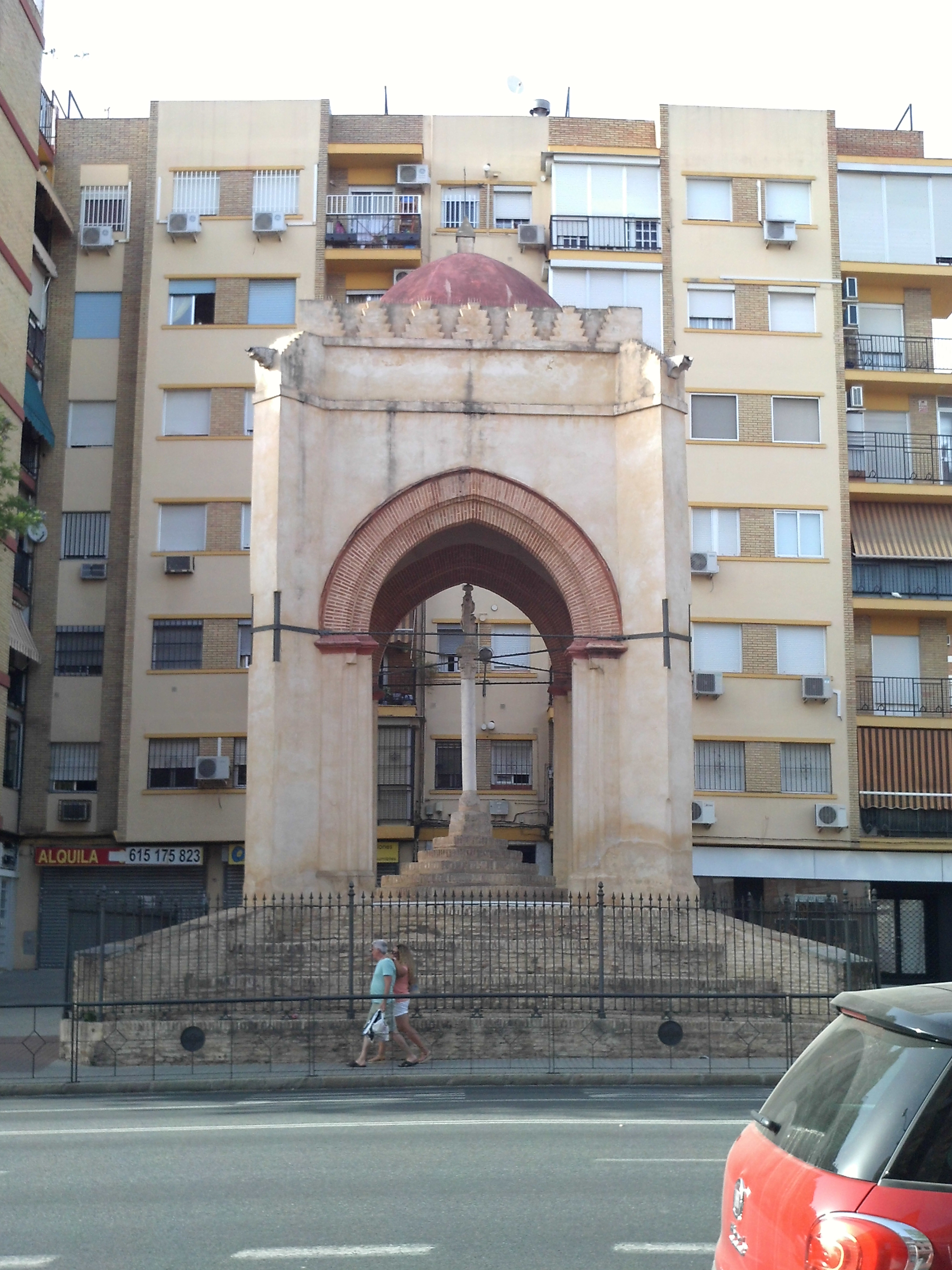
The Templete (small temple) of the Cruz del Campo, destination of the Via Crucis.

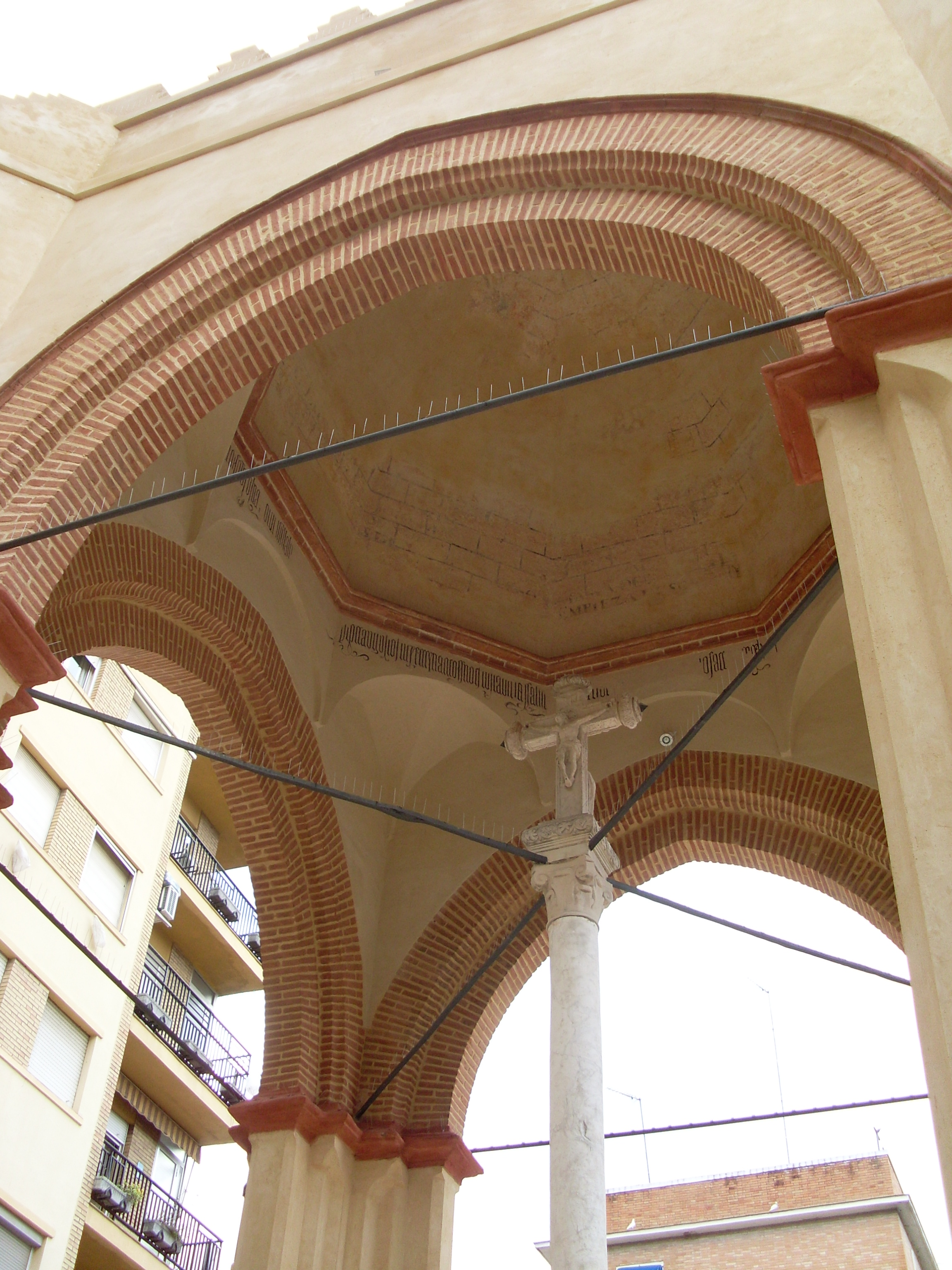
Interior of the Templete of the Cruz del Campo

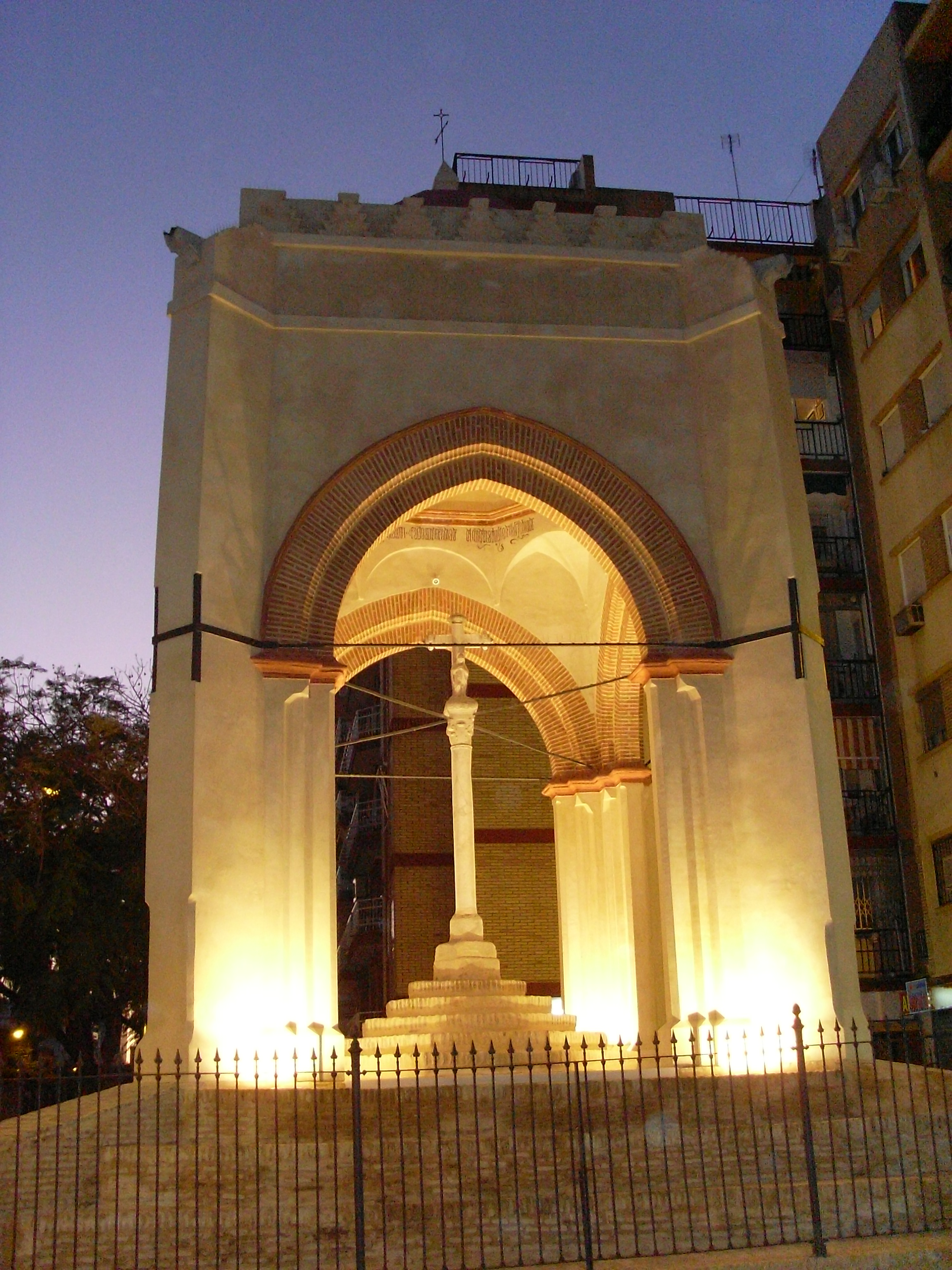
The Templete illuminated at night

The Via Crucis to the Cruz del Campo (Spanish: Vía Crucis a la Cruz del Campo) in Seville, Andalusia, Spain is believed to be Spain's only Via Crucis that runs through the streets of a city. (The term Via Crucis is of Latin origin; it is used in Spanish, although Spanish orthography places an accent mark on the i, hence Vía Crucis; in English, literally "Way of the Cross", but "Stations of the Cross" is also common.) It is the basis of the famous traditions of Holy Week in Seville. Since the Via Crucis was first laid out in 1521, both the starting and ending points have changed, as has the number of stations.

== History ==
The tradition of the Via Crucis in Spain began with the Dominican Friar Álvaro of Córdoba in 1421, but was popularized mainly by Franciscans. It is a local recreation of what is now called the Via Dolorosa in Jerusalem, by then an established feature of a pilgrimage there, though various routes have been used.

With reference to the Via Crucis in Seville, and especially with reference to the Templete (see below) for events of the 15th and 16th century, a great deal of historical caution is in order. Evidence is incomplete and sometimes contradictory. It is difficult to be confident of the continuity between entities with the same name mentioned centuries apart. The difficulties are compounded by the tendency of most sources to give only one version of events, even when the facts are in doubt.

On 20 October 1520, Don Fadrique Enríquez de Rivera, First Marquis of Tarifa, returned from a trip through Europe and the Holy Land. During Lent in 1521, he inaugurated the observance in Seville of the Holy Via Crucis. The route began in the Chapel of the Flagellations of his palace and ended at a pillar located in what some sources say was known as the Huerta de los Ángeles (Orchard of the Angels), but more likely it was called Huerta de la Hermandad de Nuestra Señora de los Ángeles, not far from the Cruz del Campo, the terminus of the route since 1630. This route ran the same distance of 997 metres (3,271 ft) or 1321 paces supposed to have separated the praetorium of Pontius Pilate from Calvary. The Marquis's palace, the Palacio de San Andrés, was then still partly under construction; it later became known as the Casa de Pilatos through its association with the Via Crucis, and, much altered over the next few centuries, is now property of the dukes of Medinaceli. It was declared a National Monument in 1931. The oldest documentation of the name Casa de Pilatos is from 1754.

In keeping with the theme of Christ's Passion, the procession became strongly associated with penitence through self-flagellation. In 1604, Cardinal Fernando Niño de Guevara issued a series of reforms intended to rein in the tendency of the processions of flagellants to take on the character of a carnival. The brotherhoods and confraternities were formally recognized, but also brought under a set of rules. Schedules were established; nocturnal processions were banned (although that particular provision would soon lapse);) the Cathedral of Seville in the city proper and the Church of Santa Ana across the river in Triana as Stations of Penitence, rather than each group beginning its route at a location of its own choosing.

Processions of flagellants were banned in Spain in 1777, as were most midnight processions; the processions of Holy Week in Seville were excepted from the latter prohibition.

With an alteration of the route in 1630, the observance continued until 1873, when it ceased at the time of the First Spanish Republic.

On 8 March 1957 the descendants of the Marquis of Tarifa reestablished the Via Crucis. Fourteen penitential confraternities from Seville walked the route of fourteen stations during Holy Week, culminating on Easter Sunday, April 21. The reestablished stations were blessed by Archbishop (and future Cardinal) Bueno Monreal, (as is now recorded on a commemorative marble memorial). (Bueno Monreal had been Coadjutor Archbishop since 1954, due to a struggle between Archbishop Pedro Segura y Sáenz—extremely conservative even by Spanish standards of the time—with the Holy See. Bueno Monreal became Archbishop on Segura's death 8 April 1957, and would become a cardinal in 1958.) This revived Via Crucis continued only for a few years.

In 1976 the council of Brotherhoods and Confraternities of Seville again reestablished the tradition.

== Route ==
The original Via Crucis initiated by the Marquis of Tarifa began inside the Casa de Pilatos in the Chapel of the Flagellations and ended at a pillar near the current Templete (small temple). Beginning in 1630, both the beginning and end of the route changed, beginning at the current shrine with its marble altarpiece erected that year on the façade of the Casa de Pilatos, and ending at the Templete. The simple wooden Cruz de las Toallas (literally "Cross of the Towels") that previously marked the first station passed into the possession of the Hermandad de los Negritos (for whom see below).

The practice of the time would have meant that the original Via Crucis of 1521 would have had seven stations, quite different from the current ones: the garden of Gethsemane; the house of the Sanhedrin, Annas; the house of Sanhedrin Caiaphas; the house of Pontius Pilate; the palace of Herod; a return to Pilate's house; and finally the hill of Calvary. Another difference from the current Via Crucis would have been that it would not initially have had such a character of an urban procession: by the fourth station, the procession would have left the walled city and would have been walking through orchards, countryside, and the scattered building on the fringes of the city. It is unclear whether the wooden crosses that initially marked the stations were permanently installed or put in place only for the Lenten season.

Eventually, this changed to a configuration more like the present one. In 1720 the last two stations were added, for a total of 14, resulting in the current route followed by each of the various confraternities who process through the city during Holy Week, which runs roughly 2 kilometres (1.2 mi) along streets in central Seville. Each station corresponds to a scene from the day of Jesus' crucifixion (see Passion). While the stations marked in centuries past by crosses on brick pedestals, originally all wooden but some eventually made of iron, scenes corresponding to the fourteen stations are now represented in azulejos (a style of ceramic tile typical of the Iberian Peninsula), some of which date from 1957, but most from near the end of the 20th century, when they were replaced because of deterioration. The azulejos at each station include both a picture and a written caption.

== The Templete ==
Everything about the origin and early years of the original humilladero (a type of roadside shrine, often at the entrance to a town) that later became the Templete is uncertain; similarly for the religious order believed to have first built it.

The Templete is traditionally dated from 1380, although some sources give a date as late as 1460. It was almost certainly constructed by the cofradía (confraternity) or hermandad (brotherhood) de negros or de negritos of Nuestra Señora de los Ángeles; it was in any case closely associated with them. That confraternity was very probably founded in the 14th century by archbishop Gonzalo de Mena; although their current Rule dates only from 1554, it is certain that they existed before that. Negros or negritos in their common name refers to the fact that they were originally an order operating a hospital that cared for Black people and, indeed, the members of the Hermandad in its early centuries were primarily (possibly exclusively) Black. In the interior of the original humilladero was a wooden cross. In that period, the modest structure was known as the Cruz del Campo ("Country Cross" or "Cross of the Field") because it stood outside the city walls. By the early 16th century, the site had already become associated with Lent and penitence.

Sources indicate that it was in 1482 that the corregidor or asistente of Seville, Don Diego de Merlo, substituted a stone cross and covered it with a Templete in the Mudéjar style, 13 metres (43 ft) in height. That date seems particularly probable because that year the archdiocese received an ostensible relic of the True Cross. However, the words written inside the dome of the Templete giving that date only date from 1881.

Fadrique Enríquez de Rivera, first Marquis of Tarifa, restored the Templete when he initiated the Via Crucis in 1521. In 1536, the Marquis bought the Templete (previously owned by the brothers of the Monastery of San Benito Abad), and moved it to its current location. The current marble cross carved with images of Jesus and Mary (which replaced the earlier wooden cross) is attributed to Juan Bautista Vázquez “The Elder”, and dates from 1571. In either 1624 or 1648 there was a further restoration by Pedro Caballero de Illescas. In 1630 it became the endpoint of the Via Crucis. In 1880 municipal architect Aurelio Alvarez did work to improve its structural integrity, and the following year Juaquín Guichot did some work, writing inside the dome that the structure dates from 1482. Metal strapping was added for structural purposes in 1888; further work was done in 1899, 1912, and 1963, but in general the structure continued to deteriorate.

In 1996, the union of confraternities involved in the Holy Week observances suggested moving the Templete to the intersection of the Avenida de Andalucía and the Ronda de Tamarguillo, but the city government rejected the idea. In 2000, José L. García of ABC Sevilla wrote of the "sad aspect" of a monument on a busy street "practically asphyxiated by modern buildings", much vandalized, with its interior turned into a filthy nest of pigeons.

In 1904 a brewery had been built nearby and took the name Cervezas Cruzcampo; it is now Heineken España. After innumerable years of promises by many entities to restore the deteriorating structure of the Templete (which has been owned by the city of Seville since at least the 19th century,) work finally began in 2007, paid for by the Fundación Cruzcampo (founded by the brewery company), and was completed 29 February 2008 with a benediction by Carlos Amigo Vallejo of Seville.

== Gallery ==
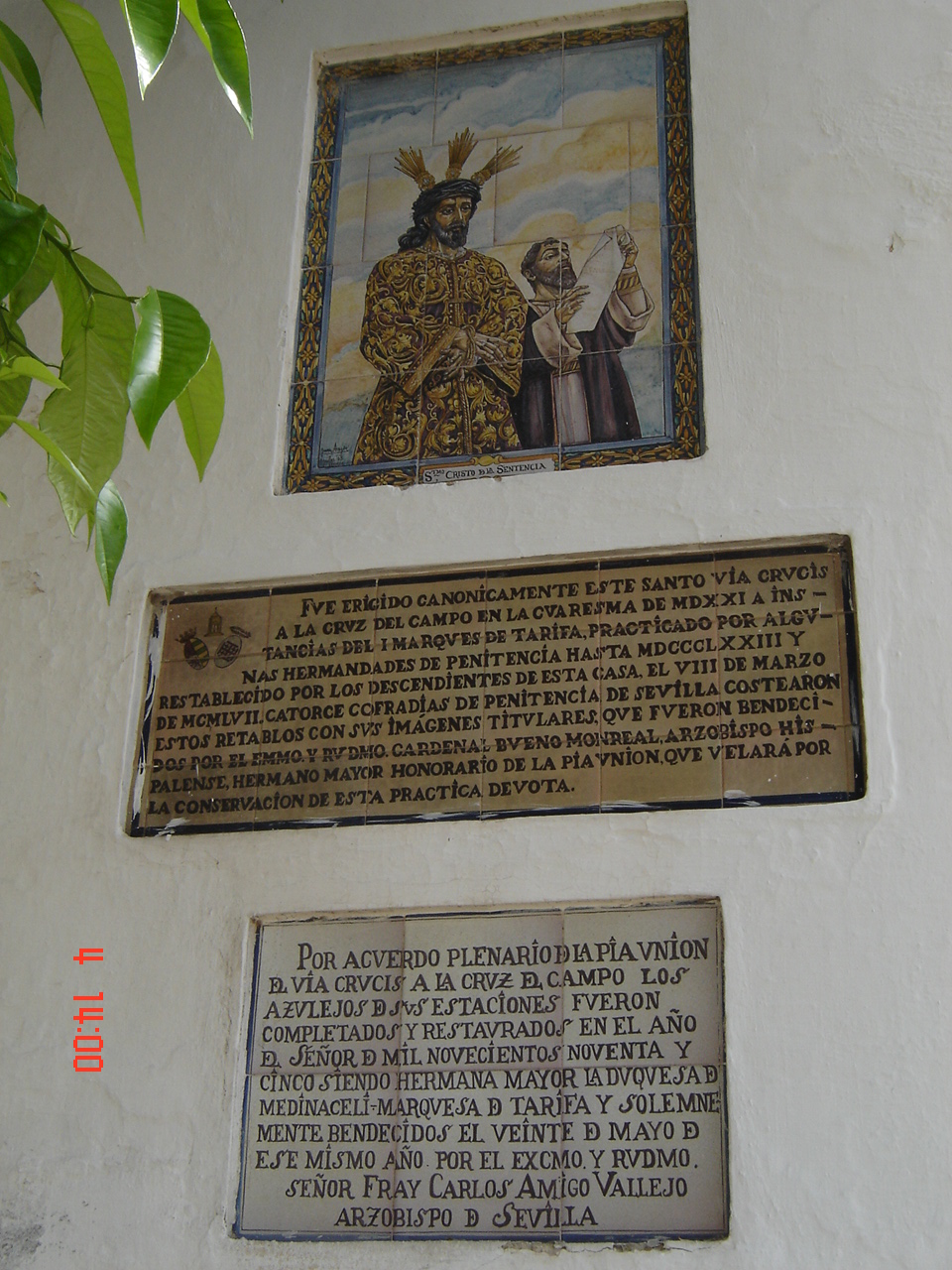
Station 1. Jesus sentenced to death. (Cristo de la Sentencia. Hdad. de La Macarena)

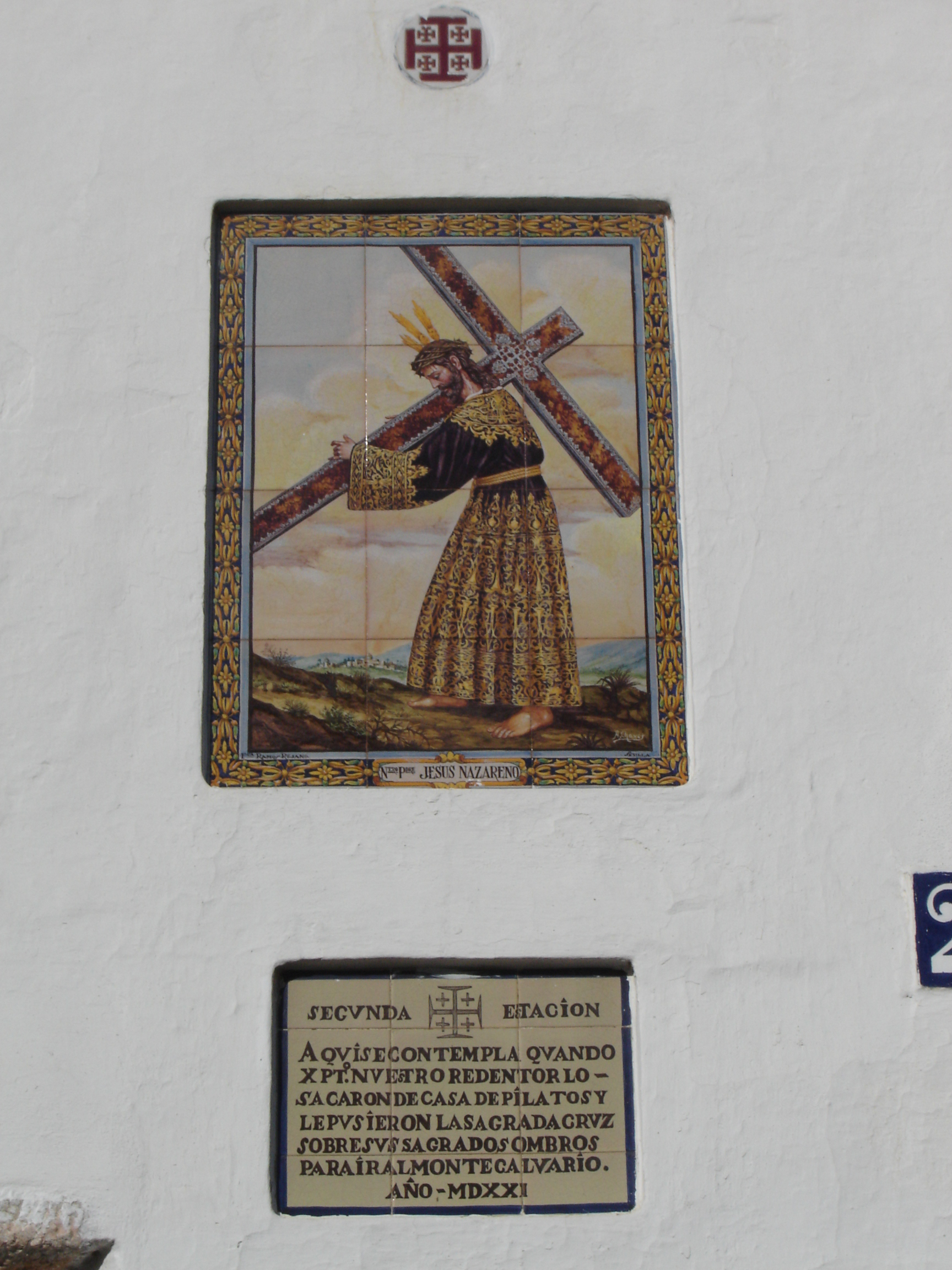
Station 2. Taken from the house of Pilate, and the cross placed on his shoulder. (Jesús Nazareno. Hdad. del Silencio).

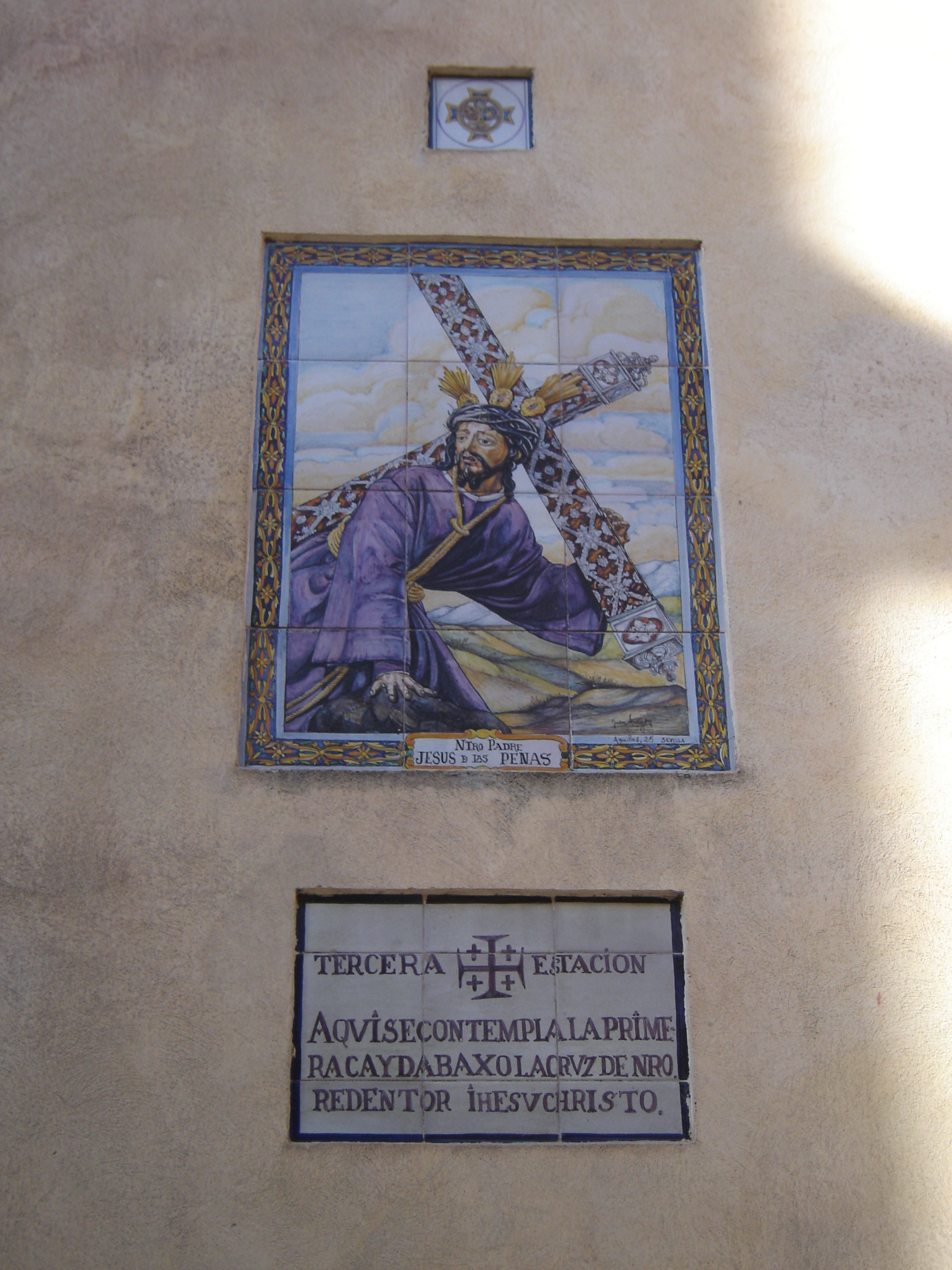
Station 3. The first fall under the cross. (Jesús de Las Penas. San Vicente).

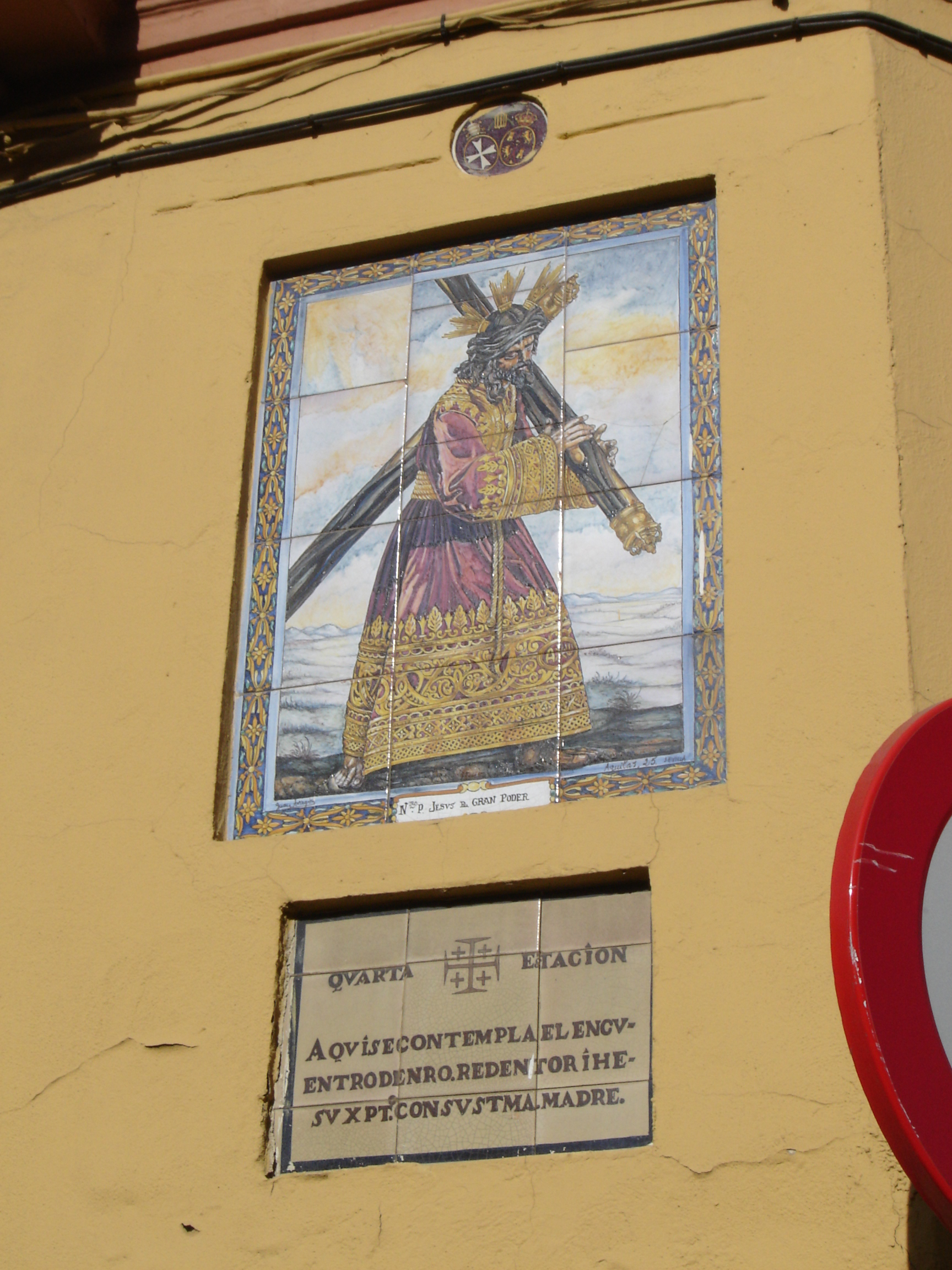
Station 4. His mother meets him on the road. (Ntro. Padre Jesús del Gran Poder)

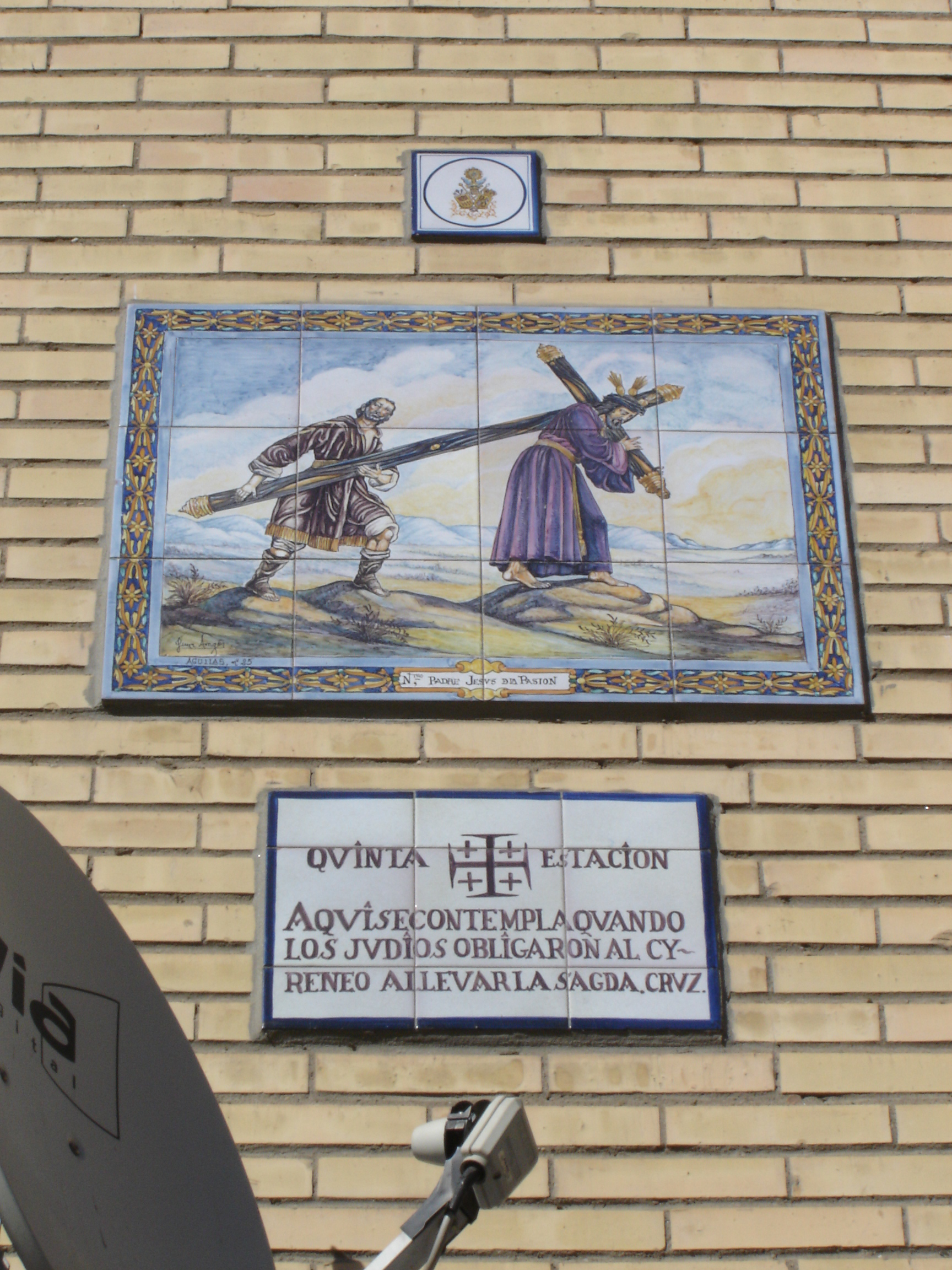
Station 5. The Cyrene helps Jesus carry the cross. (Ntro. Padre Jesús de Pasión)

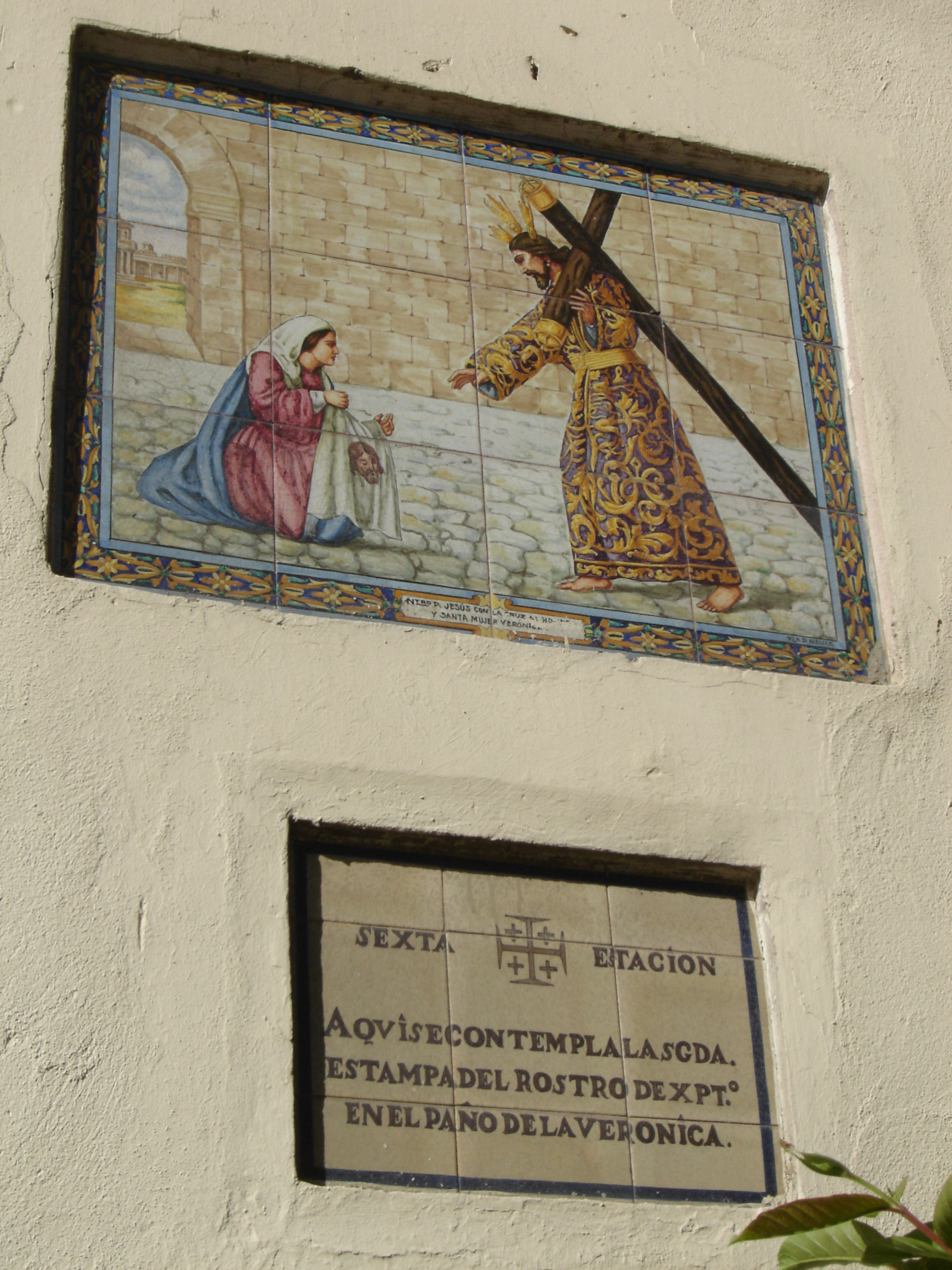
Station 6. The image of Christ imprinted on the Veil of Veronica. (Ntro. Padre Jesús con la Cruz al hombro, Hdad. del Valle)

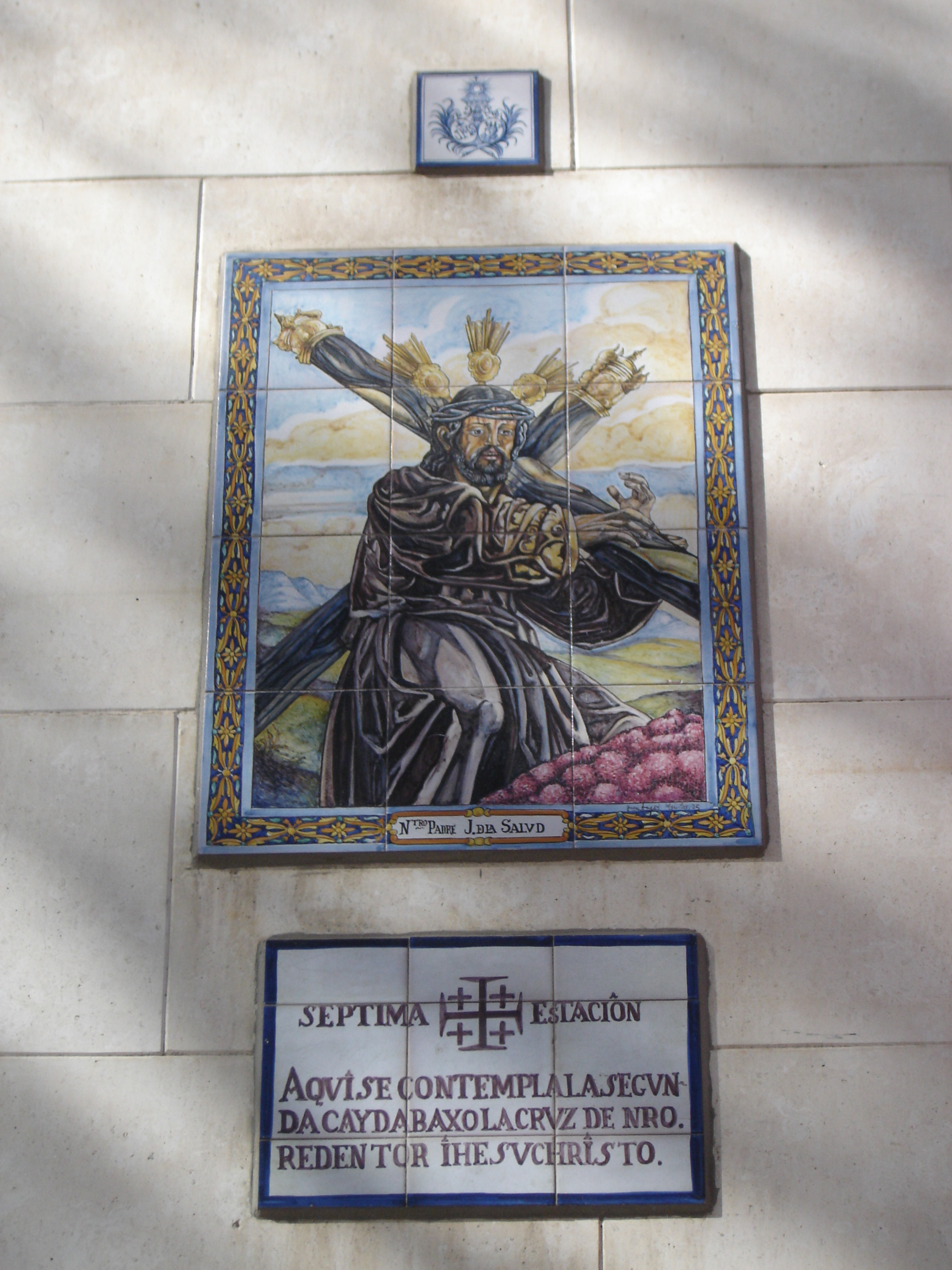
Station 7. The second fall under the cross. (Ntro. Padre Jesús de la Salud, Hdad. de la Candelaria)

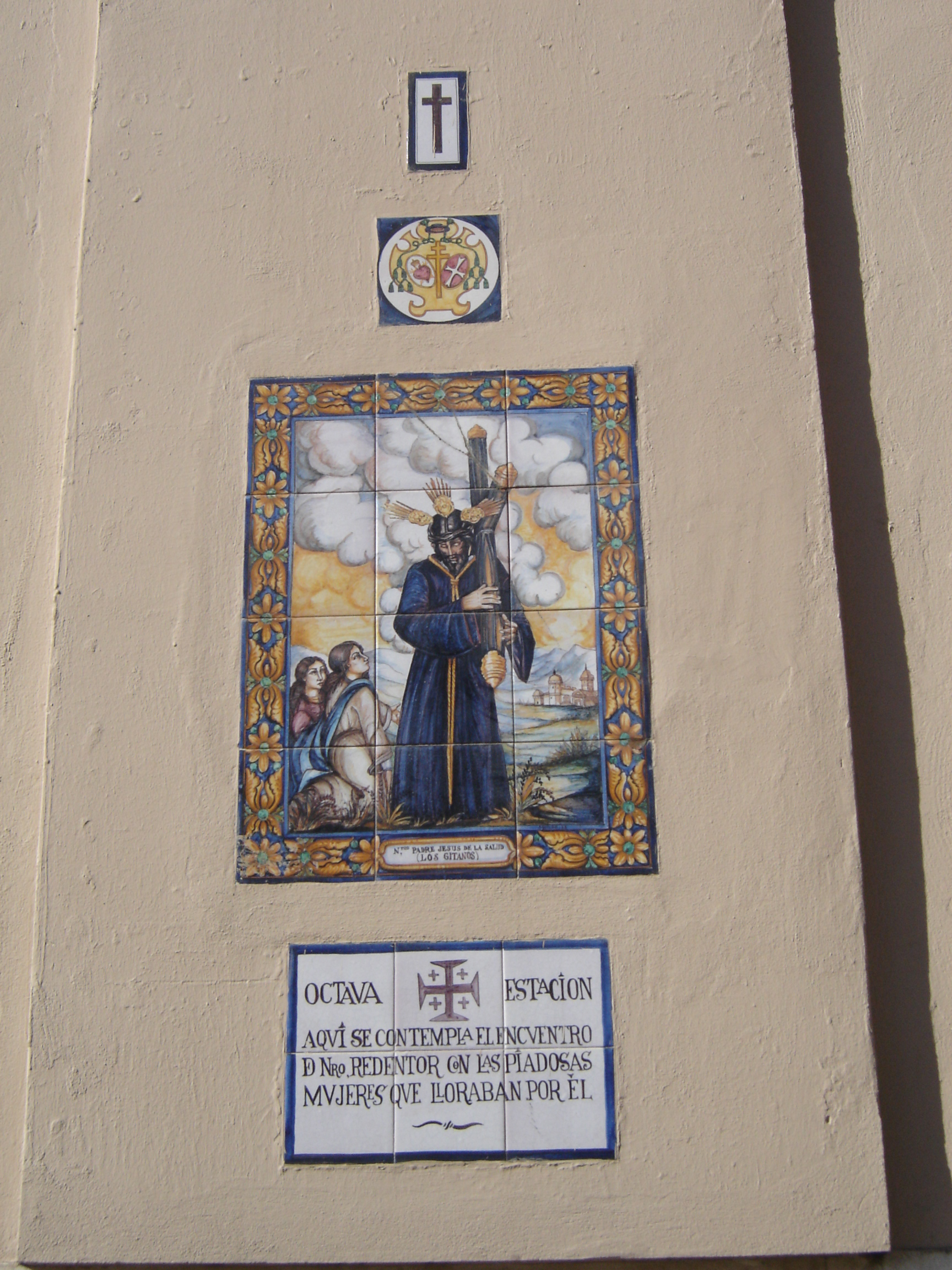
Station 8. Encounter with the pious women who cry for him. (Ntro. Padre Jesús de la Salud, Hdad. de los Gitanos)

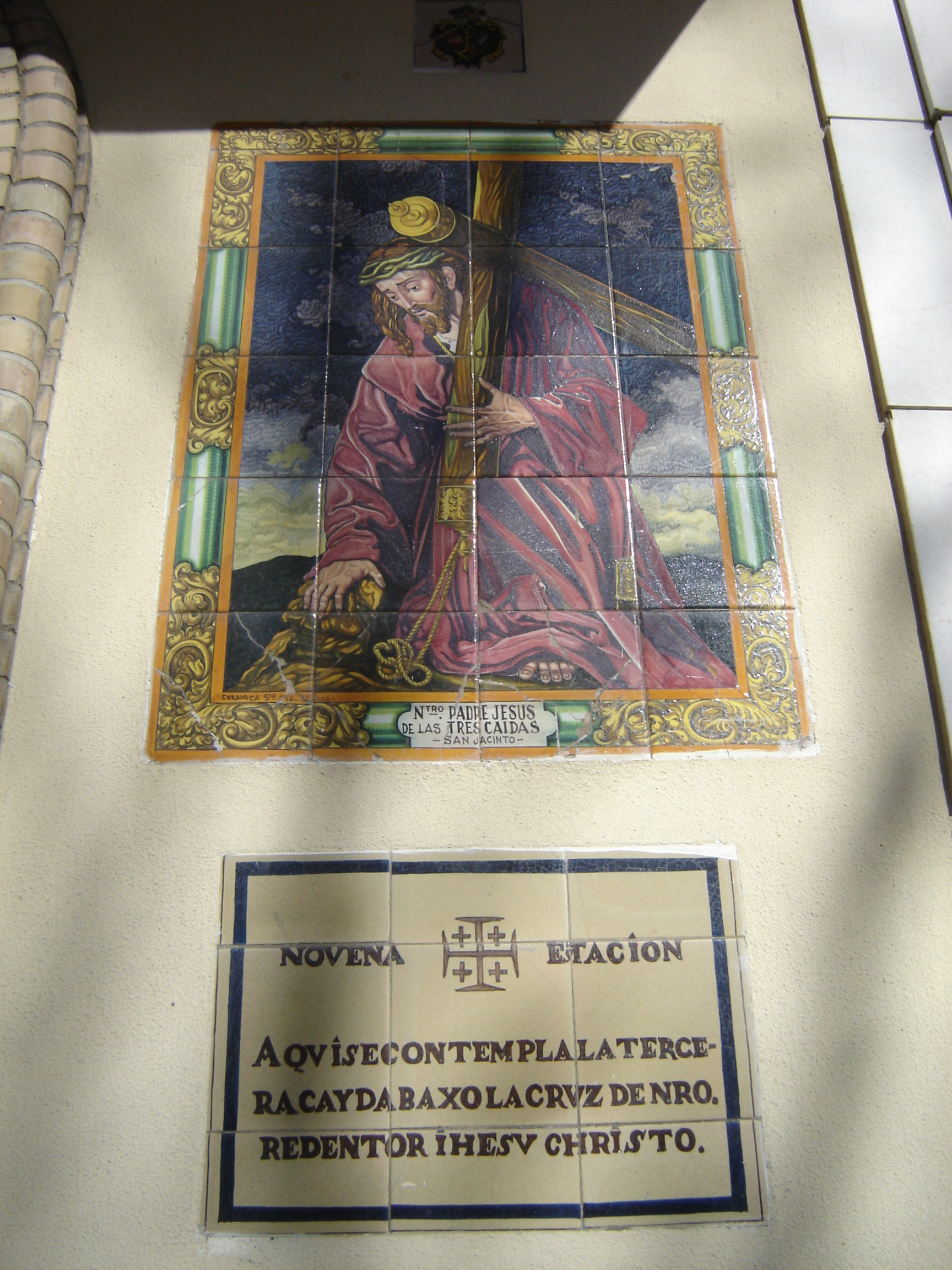
Station 9. Third fall under the cross. (Santísimo Cristo de las Tres Caídas, Hdad. Esperanza de Triana)

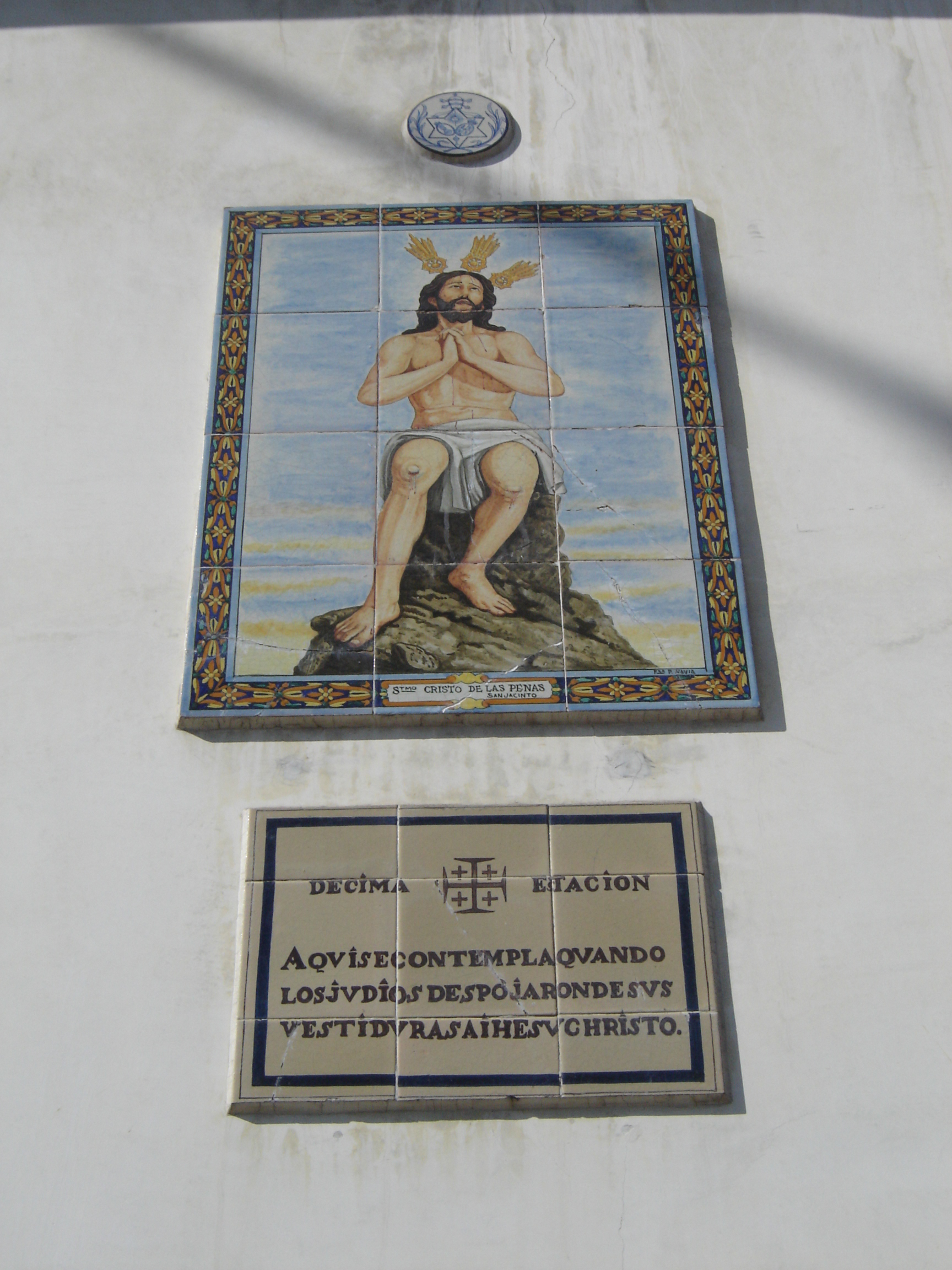
Station 10. Jesus is stripped of his garments. (Ntro. Padre Jesús de las Penas, Hdad. de la Estrella)

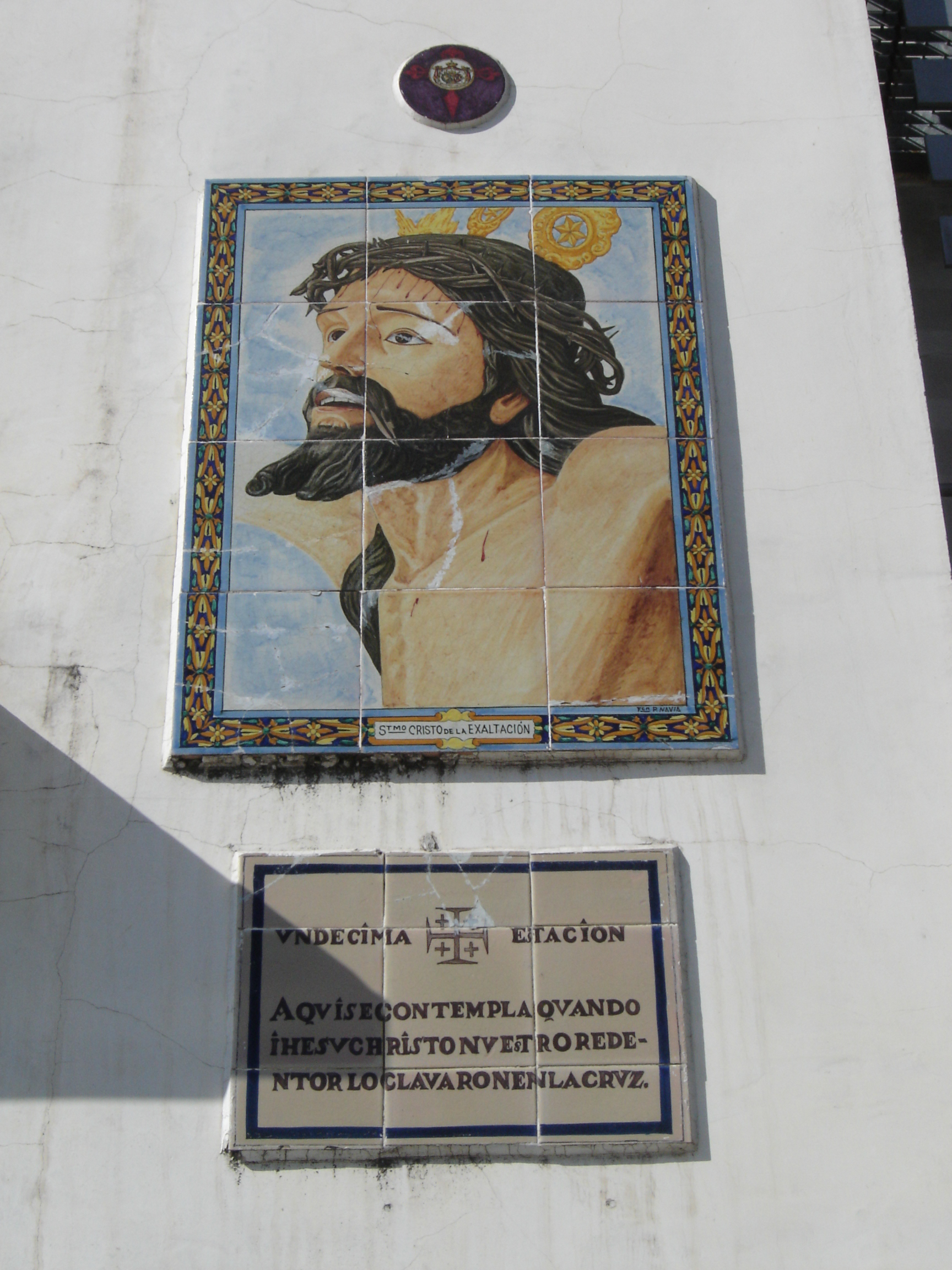
Station 11. Jesus is nailed to the cross. (Santísimo Cristo de la Exaltación, Hdad. de los Caballos o de la Exaltación)

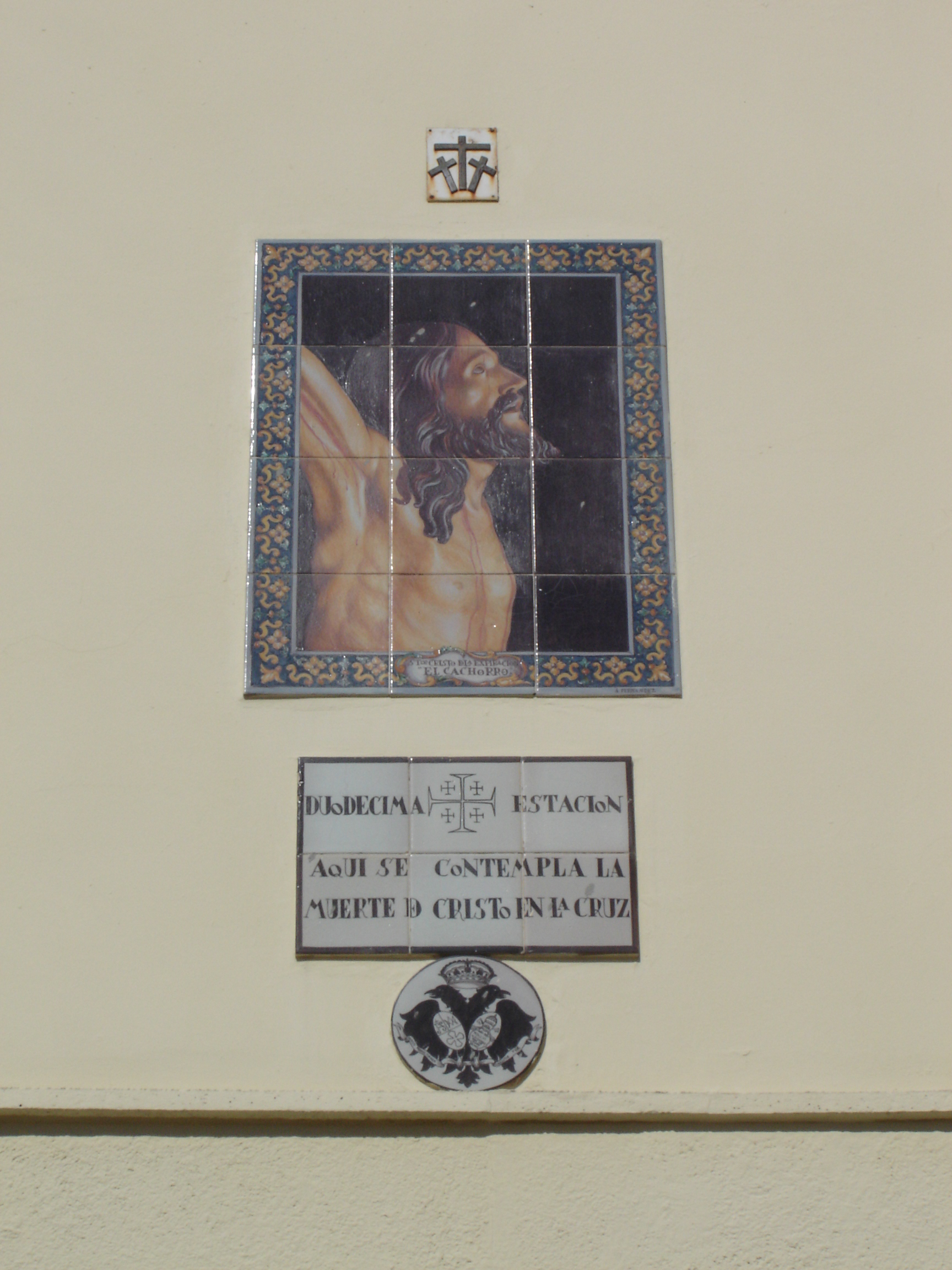
Station 12. Jesus dies on the cross. (Santísimo Cristo de la Expiración "El Cachorro", Hdad. del Cachorro)

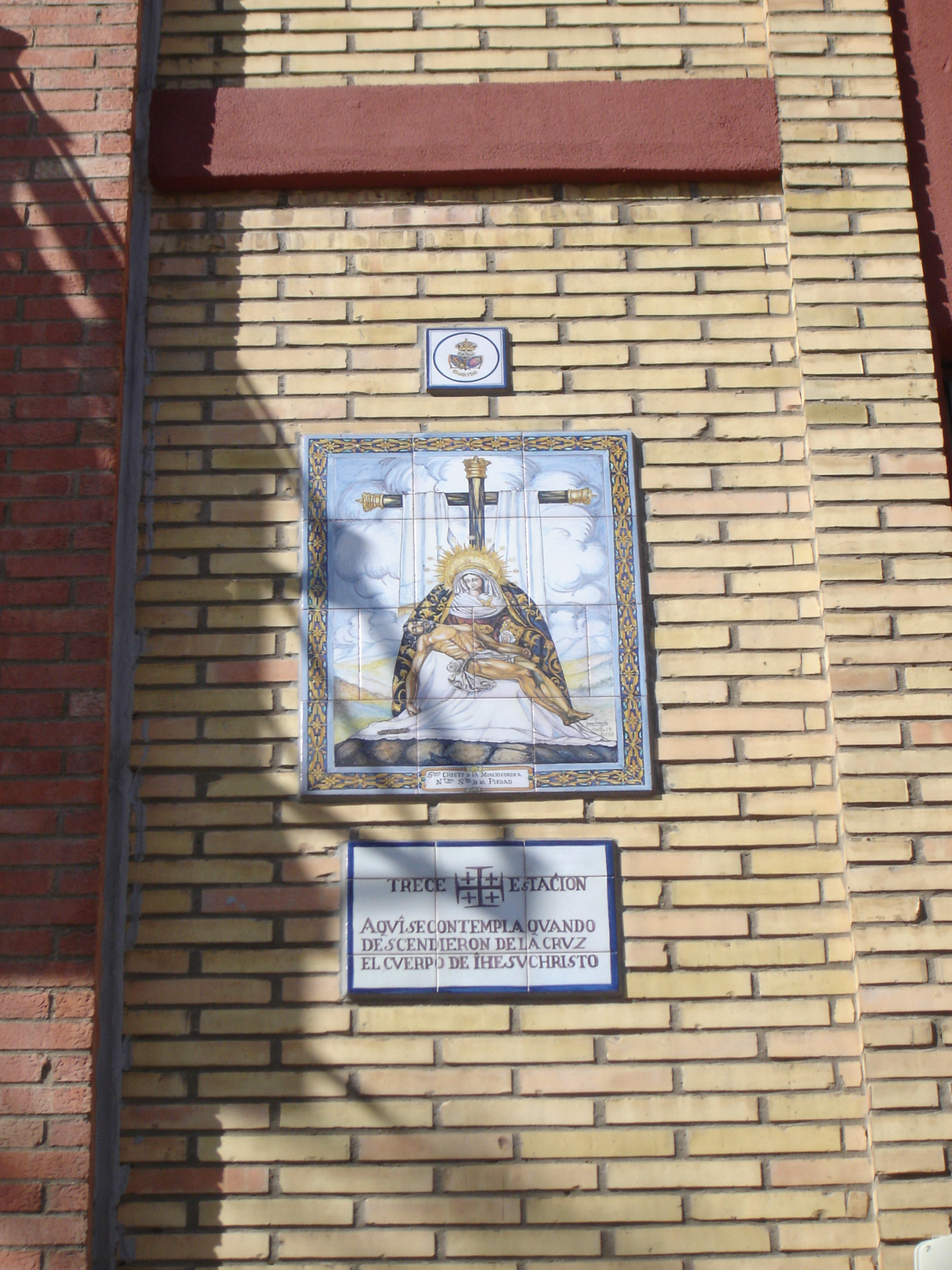
Station 13. The body of Jesus is taken down from the cross. (Santísimo Cristo de la Misericordia y Ntra. Sra de la Piedad, Hdad. del Baratillo)

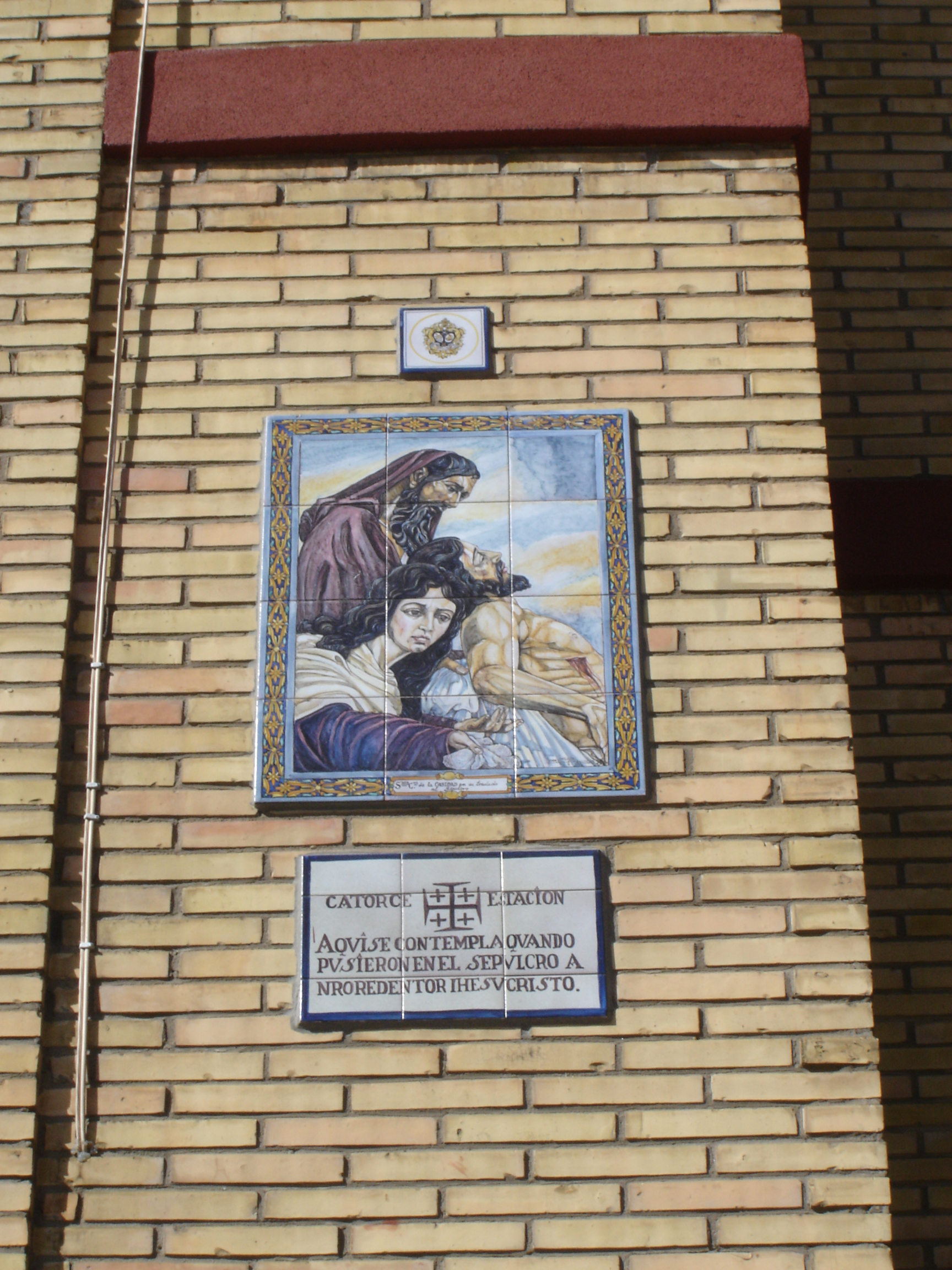
Station 14. Christ is placed in his sepulcher. (Santísimo Cristo de la Caridad, Hdad. de Santa Marta)
