= Benedict Kiely =

Irish writer and broadcaster (1919–2007)

- Born: 15 August 1919; Dromore, County Tyrone, Ireland
- Died: 9 February 2007 (aged 87); Dublin, Ireland
- Education: Mount St Columba
- Alma mater: National University
- Spouses: Maureen O'Connell; Frances Kiely
- Children: 4
- Writing career
- Genres: journalist, critic, short stories
- Notable awards: Saoi of Aosdána, 1996

Benedict "Ben" Kiely (15 August 1919 – 9 February 2007) was an Irish writer and broadcaster from Omagh, County Tyrone.

== Early life ==
Kiely was born near Dromore, County Tyrone and was a student at the Christian Brothers School in Omagh. In 1937, he went to County Laois to take up a Jesuit novitiate but went down with a tubercular spinal complaint in 1938. Lacking by then a vocation to the priesthood, he went on to University College Dublin. In 1943, he graduated B.A. from the National University.

== Career ==
In 1945, Kiely began working for the Irish Independent where he was employed as a journalist and critic. In 1950, now a father of four, he joined the Irish Press as a literary editor. In 1964, he moved to America, where he was a writer-in-residence at Emory University, visiting professor at the University of Oregon, and writer-in-residence at Hollins College (Virginia). His short stories appeared on a regular basis in The New Yorker magazine. In 1968, he returned to Ireland after having spent four years in America. In the spring of 1976, he was distinguished visiting professor at the University of Delaware. He continued to receive acclaim for his writing and journalism (a career which spans over six decades) receiving the Award for Literature from the Irish Academy of Letters. By now, he was one of Ireland's best-known writers. In 1996, he was named Saoi of Aosdána, the highest honour given by the Arts Council of Ireland.

== Later years ==
Kiely visited Omagh in 2001. This was marked by the unveiling of a plaque outside his childhood home on Gallows Hill by Omagh's Plain Speaking Community Arts group. In an interview at that time, when asked about censorship, he remarked with a typical quip: "If you weren't banned, it meant you were no bloody good". In September every year in Omagh, an event called The Benedict Kiely Literary Weekend is held to celebrate the author's many achievements.

== Family ==
A well-known brother-in-law was Frank McCrory who worked for many years as a playwright/songwriter of pantomimes at Omagh Town Hall. Frank's wife Eileen was Benedict Kiely's sister. Drumquin is often mentioned in his novels and stories as the source of his maternal family connections. His mother was from Claramore, a townland near Drumquin. His nephew was the well-known Irish country singer Brian Coll and his grand-niece is the author Sharon Owens.

== Death ==
According to RTÉ News, Kiely died in St Vincent's Hospital in Dublin on 9 February 2007, aged 87.

=== Family ===
On 5 July 1944, Kiely married Maureen O'Connell. This marriage produced four children:

- Mary Patricia Kiely (1945–1999)
- Anne Kiely (born: 1946)
- John Kiely (born: 1948)
- Emer Kiely (born: 1949)

He was survived by his second wife Frances, his daughters Anne Kiely and Emer Cronin, his son John Kiely, and a large extended family.

== List of works ==
=== Short stories ===
- The Collected Stories of Benedict Kiely (2001)
- The Trout in the Turnhole (1996)
- A Letter to Peachtree (1987)
- The State of Ireland: A Novella and Seventeen Short Stories (1981)
- A Cow in the House (1978)
- A Ball of Malt and Madame Butterfly (1973)
- A Journey to the Seven Streams (1963)

=== Literary Criticism and Non-Fiction ===
- A Raid into Dark Corners and Other Essays (1999)
- All the Way to Bantry Bay and Other Irish Journeys (1978)
- Modern Irish Fiction: A Critique (1950)
- Poor Scholar; A Study of William Carleton (1947)
- Counties of Contention (1945)

=== Novels ===
- Nothing Happens in Carmincross (1985)
- Proxopera: A Tale of Modern Ireland (1977)
- Dogs Enjoy the Morning (1968)
- The Captain with the Whiskers (1960)
- There Was an Ancient House (1955)
- The Cards of the Gambler (1953)
- Honey Seems Bitter (1952)
- In a Harbour Green (1949)
- Call for a Miracle (1948)
- Land Without Stars (1946)

=== Autobiography ===
- Drink to the Bird: An Omagh Boyhood (1992)
- The Waves Behind Us: A Memoir (1999)

=== Television and radio broadcasts ===
- Jungle of Pembroke Road (TV) (1974) – Himself
- Humours of Donnybrook (TV) (1979) – Himself
- Irish Angle – Hands: Fermanagh County (TV) (1981) – Scriptwriter
- Irish Angle – Hands: Curraghs (TV) (1985) – Narrator
- Wordweaver – The Legend of Benedict Kiely (TV) (2005) – Himself
- Sunday Miscellany (an RTÉ1 radio programme broadcast each Sunday between 9.00 and 10.00 am) – contributor of short talks mostly on literature or other Irish topics
