= Charles Tyrrell (artist) =

Irish painter and printmaker (born 1950)

- Born: 1950 (age 75–76)
- Known for: Painting, Drawing, Printmaking

Charles Tyrrell is an Irish painter and printmaker born in Trim, County Meath in 1950. Tyrrell graduated from NCAD in 1974. In 1984 Tyrell moved to Allihies on the Beara Peninsula in West Cork where he lives and works.

He exhibits regularly at the Taylor Galleries, Dublin and is a member of Aosdána. He represented Ireland at the Paris Biennale in 1982 His work is in the collection of both Irish Museum of Modern Art and the Hugh Lane Gallery. His first solo exhibition took place in the Project Arts Centre, Dublin in 1974

Tyrrell taught at the Dun Laoghaire School of Art from 1977 to 1981.

Tyrrell was nominated for the Savills Art Prize in 2017.

== Materials and process ==
In the early 1980s, when St Peter's Church on Aungier Street in Dublin was being demolished, Tyrrell salvaged timber from the building which became the material for a series of three-dimensional paintings. When working with wood Tyrrell uses a number of techniques as well as applying paint including cutting, scoring, burning and sanding.

In addition to painting on wood and canvas around the year 2000, Tyrrell began to make paintings on aluminium. For two years from 2013, he worked exclusively on aluminium. Describing his work on aluminium in 2014 Tyrrell said

The core of these pieces is that I work with metal spatulas and lay on paint ... It's a very particular engagement with the paint. Laying it on, scraping it off. Laying on a lot and pulling back, and allowing the metal come through. It's a constant process of laying on and removing paint and, very often, just leaving these very little thin, residual lines. It was like drawing with paint in a very particular kind of way, using these metal spatulas.

Tyrell has also exhibited drawings both on paper and directly on gallery walls.

== Influences ==
Tyrrell visited America in the 1980s and has cited colour field painters Kenneth Nolan and Morris Louis as well as Mark Rothko, and the abstract expressionists more generally as early influences.

He has referenced minimalism and the artist Sol LeWitt in particular as influences saying "Minimalism is my base line. Looking at Sol Lewitt I appreciate its mathematical reductivism but I always come forward from that."

He has also said that ancient Assyrian relief sculpture had influenced his work in an interview with Brian McAvera.

== Critical response ==
Patrick T. Murphy, director of the Royal Hibernian Academy has written "Charles Tyrrell is probably the best painter of his generation in Ireland".

Aidan Dunne, who has written extensively on Tyrrell's work in both catalogue essays and in The Irish Times, has said Tyrrell's work should be viewed in the context of such artists as Bridget Riley, Agnes Martin, Giorgio Morandi and Mark Rothko.
