= Tony O'Malley (painter) =

Irish artist (1913–2003)

- Born: 25 September 1913; Callan, County Kilkenny, Ireland
- Died: 20 January 2003 (aged 89)
- Education: Self taught
- Known for: Painting
- Awards: Aosdána title of Saoi; IMMA/Glen Dimplex Lifetime Achievement Award; Oireachtas Exhibition's Douglas Hyde Gold Medal; Guardian Art Critics Award; Irish-American Cultural Award; Honorary Doctorate of Trinity College of Dublin

Tony O'Malley (25 September 1913 – 20 January 2003) was an Irish artist known for painting. He was born in Callan, County Kilkenny, Ireland. O'Malley was a self-taught artist, having drawn and painted for pleasure from childhood. He worked as a bank officìal until contracting tuberculosis in the 1940s. He began painting in earnest while convalescing and, though he did at first return to bank work, he continued to paint and in 1951 he began exhibiting his work.

== Life and career ==
In 1955 O'Malley holidayed in St Ives, Cornwall, then an important centre of abstract art, and home to the artists Peter Lanyon, Patrick Heron, and Bryan Wynter, who he met and worked with. He returned again in 1957 and in 1958 retired from the bank to paint full-time. In Ireland O'Malley painted landscapes in Kilkenny, Arklow, Enniscorthy, Kilkenny and New Ross. Prompted by a mixture of frustration at the indifference shown in Ireland to his work, an attraction to the sense of freedom he felt among the artists in Cornwall, and an engagement with the attempt to represent natural forms current in their abstraction, he settled in St Ives in 1960. While he was strongly influenced by the St Ives artistic community, his relationship was one of engagement rather than direct participation. His painting never completely assimilated the rigour and formality of the British abstract painters; it retained a muscular extravagance which is central to his artistic identity. O'Malley explained:

"Not so much abstract as essence. I could not paint for the sake of the pigment of whatever, but I like abstract form in the painting which instills it with meaning and power. Abstraction does enable you to get under the surface, to get beyond appearance, and to express the mind. But abstraction for its own sake does not interest me."

Tony O'Malley adopted a sombre palette in the second half of the 1960s and many of his paintings are dedicated to the memory of his friend and mentor Peter Lanyon who was killed when the glider he was piloting crashed in 1964.

In 1973 O'Malley married Jane Harris, and through the mid-70s they spent time in the Bahamas and in O'Malley's native Callan. During this period, his paintings became less sombre and the Bahamas paintings are extremely colourful and vibrant. In 1990 they moved back to Ireland. In 1993 Tony O'Malley was elected a Saoi of Aosdána. When he died in 2003 he was regarded as one of Ireland's leading painters.

== Legacy ==
The Irish Museum of Modern Art displayed a major retrospective of his work in 2005.

In 2010 under the guidance of Jane O'Malley the RHA established an artist's residency in the house where Tony O'Malley grew up in Callan, County Kilkenny. The studio residency is awarded to artists who work primarily in paint. Previous recipients of the Tony O'Malley Studio Residency Award include Magnhild Opdøl, Ciaran Murphy, Ramon Kassan, Mollie Douthit, David Quinn and Paraic Leahy.

== Bibliography ==
- David Whittaker (2005) "Tony O'Malley: an Irish Artist in Cornwall" Oxfordshire: Wavestone Press ISBN 0-9545194-3-4
- Gemma Tipton (2003) Tony O'Malley 1913–2003.
- Dorothy Walker (2003), O'Malley, Tony in Brian Lalor (Ed.) The Encyclopedia of Ireland. Dublin: Gill and Macmillan. ISBN 0-7171-3000-2
- John O'Regan (1994), Works 14: Tony O'Malley. Dublin: Gandon Editions. ISBN 0-946846-45-6.
- Brian Lynch (Ed.), Fourth Edition (2004), Tony O'Malley. Dublin: New Island Books. ISBN 1-85928-235-0.
