= Larry Day =

American artist (1921–1998)

- Born: Lorenzo del Giorno; October 29, 1921; Philadelphia, Pennsylvania, US
- Died: April 14, 1998 (aged 76); Elkins Park, Pennsylvania, US
- Education: Tyler School of Art and Architecture, BFA and BS education
- Known for: Painting
- Style: Abstraction and realism
- Spouse: Ruth E. Fine

Lawrence James Day or Laurence J. Day (born Lorenzo del Giorno; October 29, 1921 – April 14, 1998), known professionally as Larry Day, was an American artist and visual arts instructor. He was active in Philadelphia, Pennsylvania, New York City, and Washington, D.C. during the second half of the 20th century. Although Day initially established his career with lyrical, nature-based abstract paintings, he is primarily known for his representational works.

His paintings and works on paper were included in several exhibitions that refocused attention on figurative art in the 1960s. His work is held in national and international collections, including the British Museum, the Metropolitan Museum of Art, the Philadelphia Museum of Art, the National Gallery of Art, and the Woodmere Art Museum.

== Early life ==
Lorenzo del Giorno (aka Larry Day) was born on October 29, 1921, in Philadelphia, Pennsylvania, to homemaker and seamstress Ethel Day (née Swain) and Laurence F. Day (né del Giorno), an Italian immigrant, woodworker, and employee of the American Laundry Machinery Company. Day had a younger sister named Ethel. At age six, his family moved to Cheltenham Township, a suburb of Philadelphia, where he lived until 1985. He attended Cheltenham High School, where he did well in music and poetry. He was a frequent visitor to the Philadelphia Museum of Art and the University of Pennsylvania Museum of Archaeology and Anthropology (now called Penn Museum), where he developed an interest in Egyptian art, particularly Fayum portraiture. He graduated second in a class of 260 in June 1940. After graduating, he began working as a bookkeeper.

In 1942, Day was inducted into the United States Army, reporting to the Local Board at Jenkintown Reading Railway Station. That fall, he was stationed in Chicago, where he regularly visited the Art Institute of Chicago. He was later stationed in Georgia, California, and Hawaii. During the Pacific Campaign, Day served in the 506th Antiaircraft Artillery Gun Battalion, Battery B, and participated in the invasion of Iwo Jima, narrowly escaping death on two occasions. He later served as a librarian, and his fellow soldiers called him “Doc” because he was considered an intellectual and liked to read. He received readjustment returnee travel orders on November 22, 1945.

From 1946 to 1950, Day attended Temple University’s Stella Elkins Tyler School of Fine Arts (now the Tyler School of Art and Architecture) on the G.I. Bill — critical support, as his parents could not afford his college education. Though he had been accepted as a transfer student to Kenyon College in Gambier, Ohio, to study writing with poet John Crowe Ransom, he ultimately chose to stay at the Tyler School, appreciating its strong support of all the arts. However, literature was nearly as central to him as painting, and writing remained an important part of his practice.

At Tyler, he studied fresco techniques, which he later credited as the foundation for his use of thinly painted surfaces. In 1948, Day saw the exhibition, Henry Matisse: Retrospective Exhibition of Paintings, Drawings and Sculpture, organized in collaboration with the Artist, at the Philadelphia Museum of Art. The directness of Matisse's work struck Day as radically different from the academic methods he was learning, thus influencing his understanding of painting. Day was also drawn to theater and acting, participating in several productions while at Tyler and at the Cheltenham Township Art Center (now Cheltenham Center for the Arts). In 1950, he played the lead in Oscar Wilde’s The Importance of Being Earnest, and on November 3 of that year, performed under the name Larry Regan with the Palette Players of the Cheltenham Township Art Center in Ayn Rand’s Night of January 16th, staged at the Collingswood, New Jersey Masonic Lodge.

In June 1950, Day graduated from Temple with a Bachelor of Fine Arts and a Bachelor of Science in education, and received the dean's award for scholarship and achievement in art.

== Career ==
=== Early career ===
After graduation, Day worked for a frame business with former classmates Robert and Barbara Kulicke, and started a short-lived silkscreen greeting card business called Hanco-Piday, with Bertha Hanstein (later known professionally as Bertha Leonard), Iris Cohen, and Phyllis Pittigoff. The company's name included a piece from each of their names. By 1955, Day was president of the Cheltenham Art Center, a role he held until 1958. There, he helped organize and lead the Center's theater group, participating in and directing productions including Thornton Wilder’s The Merchant of Yonkers and William Inge’s Picnic.

Throughout the 1950s, Day had several exhibitions. His work was represented by private dealer Pearl Fox and by Dubin Galleries, both in Philadelphia. He was also included in the Pennsylvania Academy of the Fine Arts annual exhibitions. He began his teaching career with high school students at Abraham Lincoln High School (1951–1952) and Germantown High School (spring 1953). In the fall of 1953, he was invited to join the faculty of the Philadelphia Museum School of Art (later known as the Philadelphia College of Art, and eventually the University of the Arts, now shuttered, where he taught until 1988). There, he taught painting, drawing, and art theory.

Day made his first of several trips to Europe in 1952, on the maiden voyage of the SS United States, arriving in Southampton, England. He then stayed in Paris and visited Provence, London, the Netherlands, and Belgium. During this time, he made art in his hotel room and drew from life models at the Académie de la Grande Chaumière.

In the early 1950s, Day created figurative paintings, prints, and drawings. By the mid-1950s, however, his work shifted toward abstract expressionism, which was gaining prominence at the time. He frequently traveled to New York City, where he associated with the abstract expressionist circle at the Cedar Tavern, including Franz Kline, Charles Cajori, John Ferren, Philip Guston, and Mercedes Matter. By the mid-1950s, his work was represented by Parma Gallery in New York. In 1958, he also began exhibiting at Gallery 1015, directed by Gladys Myers in Wyncote, Pennsylvania. That same year, he co-founded the Interlocutors, a discussion group composed of members from diverse professions, which met monthly at the University of Pennsylvania. Scenes from the Interlocutors’ annual dinner parties would later appear in many of Day's drawings and paintings.

=== Mid-career ===
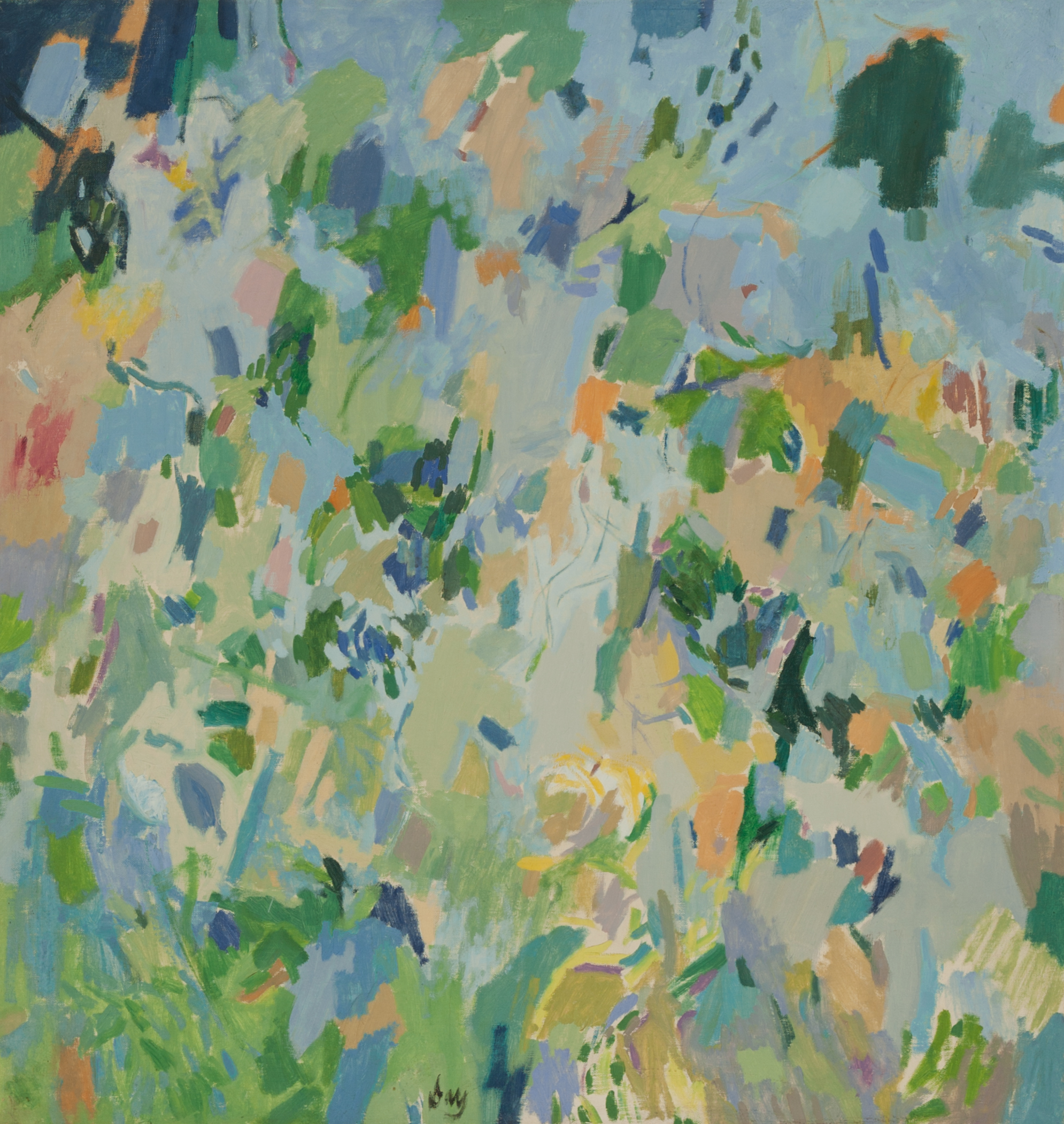
Larry Day, Screen, 1957, oil on canvas, courtesy of copyright holder, Ruth E. Fine

Day's professional career was well established by 1959. He exhibited his painting Dark Laughter in the 2nd Philadelphia Arts Festival: Regional Exhibition at the Philadelphia Museum of Art, and contributed an essay titled “The Artist as Philadelphian” to the exhibition catalogue. On March 21, 1961, he participated as a panelist in Conversations with Artists: Where Do We Go from Here?, alongside Marcel Duchamp, Louise Nevelson, and Theodoros Stamos. He was an artist-in-residence at Aspen Center of Contemporary Art when it opened in 1960, and also in 1961, 1962, and 1964. In 1962, he overlapped with fellow artist-in-residence and lifelong friend Leland Bell from June 22 to September 1.

By 1962, Day had transitioned from abstraction back to representation, beginning with a loosely painted copy of a work by Jan Steen. In a 1991 interview with Marina Pacini for the Archives of American Art, Day explained: “It's again this and that, rather than just this or just that.” During the 1960s, he began painting architectural scenes—primarily in Philadelphia—as well as narrative figure compositions in both indoor and outdoor settings.

Throughout the 1960s, Day exhibited in both solo and group exhibitions in Philadelphia and New York. His work was included in the 12th National Print Exhibition at the Brooklyn Museum in 1960, a two-person show with Sidney Goodman at the Proctor Arts Institute at Bard College in 1965, and exhibitions at Elaine Benson Gallery in Bridgehampton, New York. Other group exhibitions during this period included 10/XII, Exhibition: Contemporary American Drawings at the Indiana University School of Fine Arts Gallery and Realism Now at the Vassar College Art Gallery, the latter curated by the art historian Linda Nochlin.

His work was also curated into exhibitions organized by the sculptor Scott Burton, including The Realist Revival, a traveling group exhibition presented by the American Federation of Arts in 1973. The show toured to several venues including the Georgia Museum of Art (Athens), the J.B. Speed Art Museum (KY), among other institutions.

By the 1970s, Day exhibited regularly at galleries, universities, and museums across the United States and abroad. His work appeared in four traveling exhibitions, including American Figure Drawing, which was shown at Lehigh University (Pennsylvania), the Victorian College of the Arts Gallery (Melbourne, Australia), and the Art Gallery of South Australia (Adelaide).

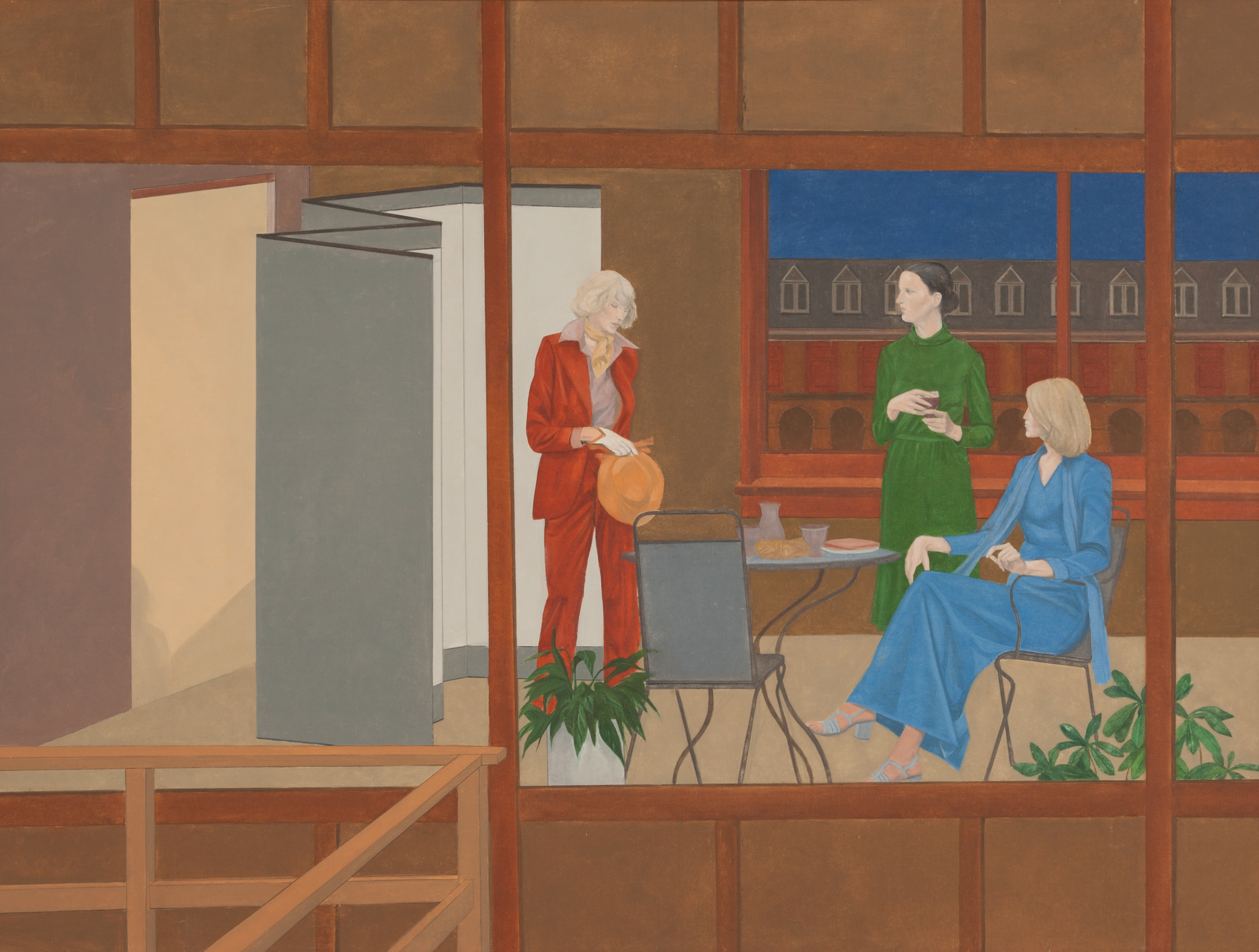
Larry Day, Tua Marrit Wemen and the Wedo Homage to William Bundar, 1978, oil on cotton, courtesy of copyright holder, Ruth E. Fine

Day gave the first of several lectures at the New York Studio School in January 1972 and served as a visiting artist at Westminster College (Pennsylvania) in New Wilmington, Pennsylvania in 1974. Gross McCleaf Gallery in Philadelphia began representing his work in 1975. He co-juried Philadelphia in the Bicentennial Year: Drawings by Philadelphia Artists at the Atwood Gallery of Art, Beaver College (now Arcadia University) with Grace Hartigan, who selected the exhibition's award recipients. Day's work was part of the bicentennial exhibition Philadelphia: Three Centuries of American Art (April 11–October 10, 1976) at the Philadelphia Museum of Art. The catalogue, which was edited by George H. Marcus, included the painting Untitled (1960–61), chosen by Anne d'Harnoncourt.

In 1978, Day was awarded a fellowship to the MacDowell Colony and presented a lecture titled Painting as Paradigm at the symposium What Is a Painting? held at the Philadelphia Museum of Art. He concluded the decade with a notable public appearance in Artists Talk on Art Forum: Figurative Art—A Dialogue with Four Generations, a panel discussion held on December 7, 1979, at Landmark Gallery in New York, where he appeared alongside John Benton, George Hildrew, and Alice Neel.

=== Late career ===
Day continued to exhibit widely during the 1980s including Perspectives on Contemporary American Realism: Works of Art on Paper from the Collection of Jalane and Richard Davidson (1982–1983) at the Pennsylvania Academy of the Fine Arts and the Art Institute of Chicago; the Annual Exhibition of the American Academy of Arts and Letters (1984); and American Drawings: Realism/Idealism at the Boca Raton Museum of Art (1987). He represented Maryland in the two-year traveling National Invitational Drawing Exhibition, which featured one artist from each of the 50 U.S. states.

In 1993, Day was awarded a grant from the Richard Florsheim Art Fund to support a catalog for his 1994 traveling solo exhibition Tempi del Giorno: Eighteen Drawings by Larry Day now in the collection of the Philadelphia Museum of Art, shown at venues throughout the Mid-Atlantic and Midwest. In September 1990, he received a request from the National Portrait Gallery in Washington, D.C., for slides of his work, to which he replied that he did not consider himself a portrait painter and was not interested in “doing anything in the vein.”

Day remained active as an educator during these last decades. Dedicated to teaching, Day become known as “the Dean of Philadelphia painters”. He intermittently served as a senior critic at the University of Pennsylvania Graduate School of Fine Arts (1980–1989), taught summer classes and gave critiques at Queens College, and led critiques at the Pennsylvania Academy of the Fine Arts. He was a visiting scholar at Western Carolina University in 1992 and a visiting critic at Knox College in Galesburg, Illinois, in 1996. Although he retired from the University of the Arts in 1988, he continued to lecture there periodically through 1996. His work and teaching inspired other artists including Peter Paone, Eileen Neff, Joe Fyfe, and Sidney Goodman.

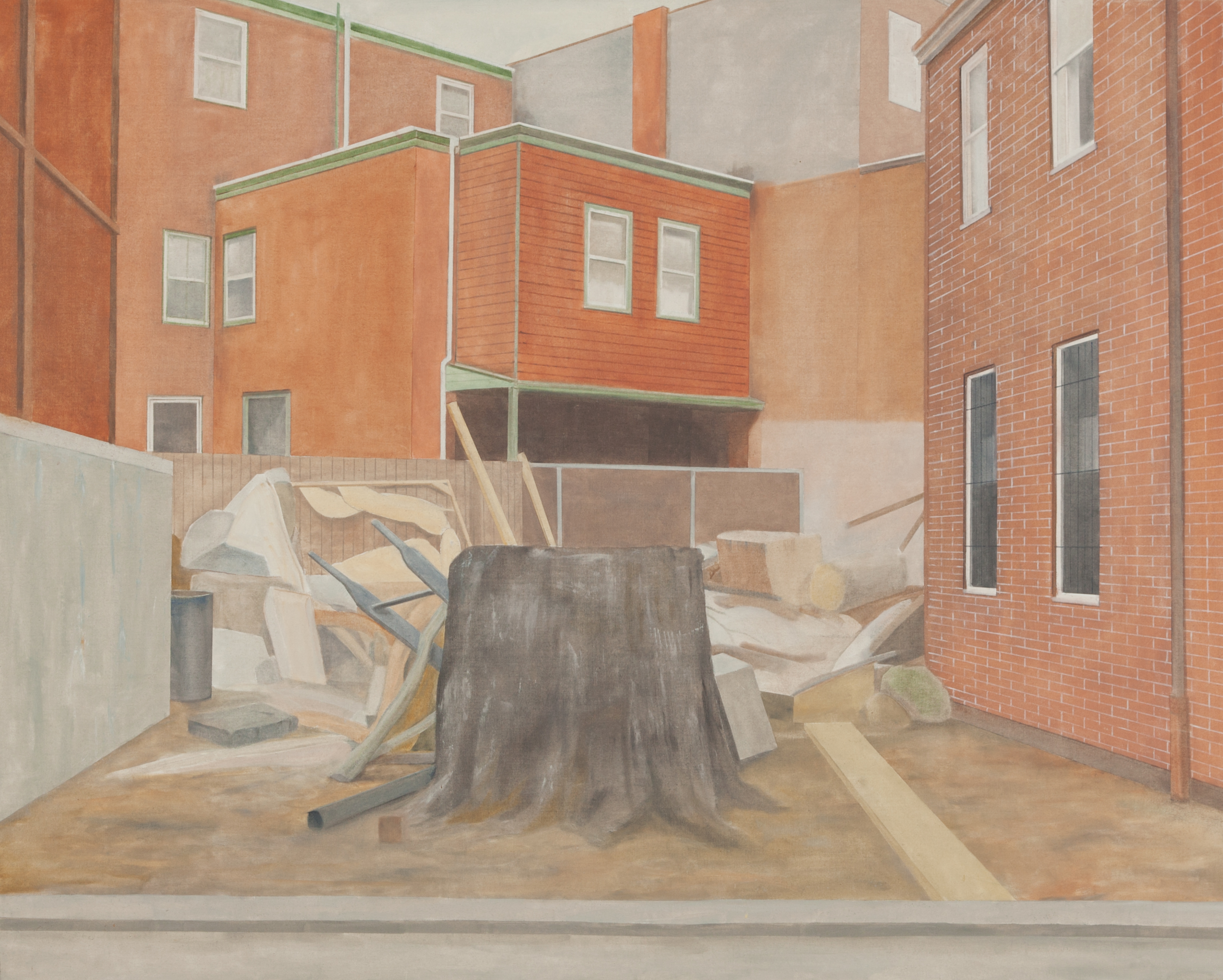
Larry Day, Yggdrasil, 1991, oil on linen, courtesy of copyright holder, Ruth E. Fine

== Awards and honors ==
During the 1980s, Day received several honors and awards. These included the Temple University General Alumni Association Certificate of Honor for contributions to his profession (1980), the Hazlett Memorial Award for Excellence in the Arts from the Pennsylvania Governor's Office (1982), and a Citation for Excellence from the Pennsylvania House of Representatives (1982), a grant from the Ingram Merrill Foundation (1984), the Penny McCall Foundation Grant (1988), and the Mayor's Award for Contributions to the Cultural Life of the City of Philadelphia (1988).

In 1988, the Larry Day Scholarship Award in Painting was established for a promising student at the he University of the Arts. In 1990, Day received the Oscar Williams and Gene Derwood Award for excellence among poets and artists. He was named to the 100 Club of distinguished alumni of Cheltenham High School.

In 2021 and 2022, a three-venue posthumous solo exhibition, Body Language: The Art of Larry Day, celebrated the centennial of Day's birth and commemorated the artist's legacy. Nature Abstracted featured early abstractions at the University of the Arts; Absent Presence at Arcadia University explored Day's cityscape and architectural subjects and a gallery of Day's early prints was also on view; and Woodmere, which organized the exhibition, installed figurative compositions as well as an array of Day's drawings from throughout his career. The catalogue, which included works from all venues, was published by the University of Pennsylvania Press. Simultaneously the Gross McCleaf Gallery also installed Larry Day at 100.

== Personal life ==
On October 1, 1983, Day married artist Ruth E. Fine, who was then serving as a curator at the National Gallery of Art in Washington, D.C. In the spring of 1984, he was diagnosed with bladder cancer—the first of several cancer diagnoses he would receive over the next fourteen years. He spent the summer of 1984 recovering at Long Beach Island, New Jersey, and in 1985 moved to Takoma Park, Maryland to be closer to Fine and her work. In 1986, he legally changed his name from Lawrence James del Giorno to Lawrence James Day.

From 1988 to 1992, Day attended reunions of his World War II unit, the 506th Antiaircraft Artillery Gun Battalion, held in Lancaster, PA (1988), Marietta, OH (1989), Cumberland, MD (1990), Erie, PA (1991), and Hagerstown, MD (1992), and became involved with memories of the war.

In 1995, he returned to Elkins Park, Pennsylvania, where he lived until his death on April 14, 1998. A memorial service was held at the University of the Arts on June 11, 1998. At the time, his drawing Elegies (Homage to Rilke) was on view in the University's CBS Auditorium.

== Style and influences ==
=== Early figuration ===
Day's training in painting at Tyler School of Art was based on traditional layering and glazing methods, but seeing the Matisse exhibition at the Philadelphia Museum of Art in 1948 introduced him to substantially more direct painting methods.

=== Abstraction ===
In the mid-1950s, Day shifted from his early figurative work to paintings and drawings aligned with abstract expressionism. These paintings feature gestural brushwork and an “allover” compositional approach reminiscent of Willem de Kooning, while the thin, hatched networks of color suggest connections to the paintings of Paul Cézanne. Art historical references were a consistent presence in Day's studio practice, as were issues of containment, fragmentation, and camouflage—found in the thinly painted patchwork of delicate marks that spiral around the surfaces of his canvases. These formal concerns and references would continue throughout his career. Day's abstract works are rarely pure abstraction. There are often figurative elements within the shapes and brushwork of earlier abstractions. Works from the late 1950s and early 1960s reference vegetation, undergrowth, and bushes.

=== Narrative ===
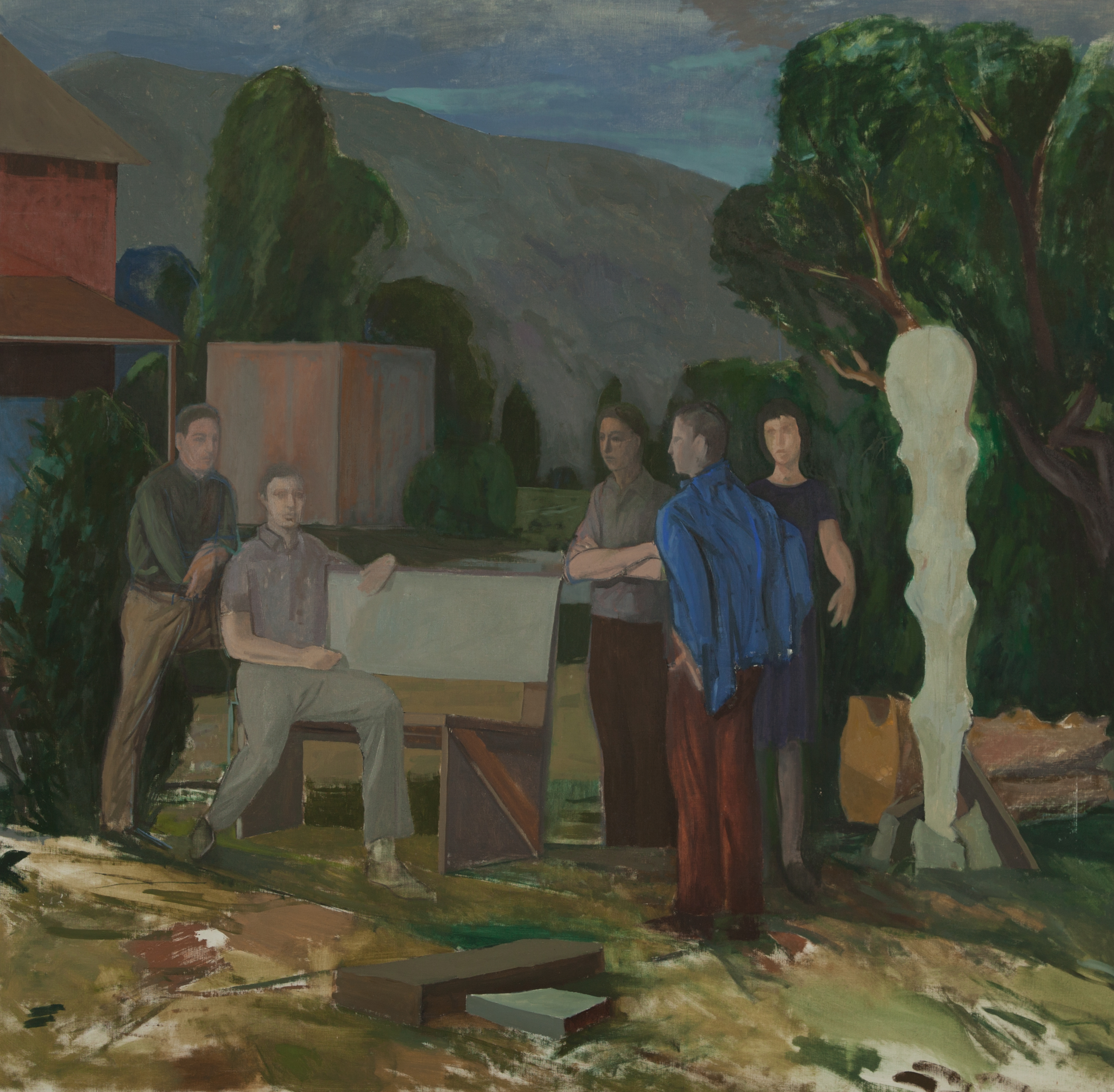
Larry Day, Aspen, 1964, oil on cotton, courtesy of copyright holder, Ruth E. Fine

In 1962, Day abandoned abstract painting and moved into realism with After Jan Steen (1962). Over time, he shifted toward more static compositions, with frontal figures constrained by their environments. Day's interest in the narrative potential of group dynamics led him to paint scenes of people playing games such as Twister, Charades, and Poker. The scenes he painted are not literal depictions of events but visual frameworks for exploring metaphors, literary references and philosophical concerns. His narrative scenes act as parallels to other ideas, rather than depictions of real events.

Day's work was also about communities and interactions of people. He felt that the everyday was extraordinary, dramatic, and important. He frequently explored the dual role of the artist as both observer and participant, depicting the quiet labor of studio life with classical themes of grandeur, eroticism, and myth. Some of the self-portraits are self-deprecating or present him as ordinary. Many of the paintings featured his friends, and his presence is only implied. The Poker Game (1970) references Cézanne's poker game at the Barnes Foundation. He was represented in the drawings, but by the completion of the finished painting, he's represented by an empty chair.

=== Architecture ===
Day produced a body of architectural and urban landscape works that extended his formal and conceptual concerns into unpopulated environments. These cityscapes—many of which were featured in the 2021–2022 exhibition Body Language segment, Absent Presence at Arcadia University—focus on mundane or transitional spaces: construction sites, alleys and partially dismantled structures.

=== Late narrative drawings ===
Drawing was central to Day's artistic practice through his final years. In the 1990s he produced a series of linear ink works on paper representing literary, mythological and historical figures interacting in towns and villages.

== Legacy ==
Day's journals and writings are now housed at the Smithsonian Archives of American Art, while his visual art archives are best represented at Woodmere Art Museum. His work is held in national and international collections, including the British Museum, the Metropolitan Museum of Art, the Philadelphia Museum of Art, the National Gallery of Art, and the Woodmere Art Museum in Philadelphia.
