= A Little Treasury of Modern Poetry =

1946 book edited by Oscar Williams

First edition (US)

A Little Treasury of Modern Poetry: English and American is an anthology of poetry, edited by Oscar Williams, which was published by Scribner's, New York, in 1946, and Routledge and Kegan Paul, London, in 1947. Another edition, enlarged and rearranged, was published in 1952.

In a letter to his friend Louis Zukofsky, William Carlos Williams wrote: "But if you happen to stumble across Scribner's latest, A Little Treasury of Modern Poetry, edited by O. Williams - look into it and die - of laughing. What a sell!"

Geoffrey Hill's father bought him a copy of this anthology when Hill was about fifteen. He carried the book in his jacket pocket all around Worcestershire for several years until it disintegrated. He later recalled in a conversation with John Haffenden: "I think there was probably a time when I knew every poem in that anthology by heart."

It was through this anthology that James Dickey came across the work of Dunstan Thompson, whose poem "Largo" displayed technical abilities that influenced Dickey's development.

== Poets in A Little Treasury of Modern Poetry, 1947 edition ==
Gerard Manley Hopkins, Francis Thompson, James Stephens, A. E. Housman, Thomas Hardy, Delmore Schwartz, Vernon Watkins, Stephen Spender, Conrad Aiken, Henry Treece, George Barker, Elizabeth Bishop, T. S. Eliot, Theodore Spencer, Dylan Thomas, W. B. Yeats, Léonie Adams, Yvor Winters, Edwin Muir, W. R. Rodgers, Robert Graves, R. P. Blackmur, Walter de la Mare, W. J. Turner, Robert Frost, Louis MacNeice, Muriel Rukeyser, Albie Huston Evans, Elinor Wylie, Robert Penn Warren, W. H. Davies, Robert Bridges, E. E. Cummings, John Manifold, Geoffrey Grigson, Emily Dickinson, W. H. Auden, Robinson Jeffers, Helen Hoyt, Maxwell Bodenheim, Patrick Orr, Richard Eberhart, Edwin Arlington Robinson, Allen Tate, Edgar Lee Masters, John Crowe Ransom, John Hall Wheelock, Harold Monro, Mark Van Doren, John Peale Bishop, Sidney Keyes, John Berryman, Hart Crane, Frederic Prokosch, Julian Symons, Karl Shapiro, Dunstan Thompson, F. T. Prince, Wilfred Owen, Alan Seeger, Roy Fuller, Shaemas O'Sheel, Herbert Read, Winfield Townley Scott, Rupert Brooke, Isaac Rosenberg, Edith Sitwell, Marianne Moore, Rolfe Humphries, Oscar Williams, Jean Garrigue, D. H. Lawrence, Gene Derwood, Alex Comfort, Timothy Corsellis, Alun Lewis, Lawrence Durrell, Archibald MacLeish, John Masefield, Wallace Stevens, Glenway Wescott, Marshall Schact, Edna St. Vincent Millay, Sara Teasdale, Esther Mathews, A. E. Coppard, Louise Bogan, John Thompson, Jr, H. D., James Joyce, Anne Ridler, W. J. Turner, Ezra Pound, Edwin Denby, Michael Roberts, Edward Thomas, John Drinkwater, Edith Wyatt, George Santayana, D. S. Savage, William Empson, Hildegarde Flanner, Edwin Markham, Vachel Lindsay, Ben Maddow, Alfred Hayes, William Carlos Williams, Sarah Norcliffe Cleghorn, Roy Campbell, Terence Heywood, John Davidson, Ralph Hodgson, Rudyard Kipling, Peter Quennell, F. R. Higgins, John Malcolm Brinnin, Frances Cornford, H. H. Lewis, John Betjeman, G. K. Chesterton, E. V. Swart, Philip O'Connor, Ogden Nash, David Daiches, Kenneth Fearing, W. S. Gilbert, Marsden Hartley, Geoffrey Taylor, Gelett Burgess, Gavin Ewart, Arnold Bennett, C. D. B. Ellis, Gertrude Stein, Anthony Euwer, "Emanuel Morgan", Harry Graham, Oliver St. John Gogarty.
