= Pulsifer =

Pulsifer may refer to:

== People ==
- Addison G. Pulsifer (1874–?), American architect
- David Pulsifer (1802–1894), American historian
- Joseph Perkins Pulsifer, founding citizen of Beaumont, Texas
- Simon Pulsifer (born 1981), Wikipedia editor
- Harold Trowbridge Pulsifer (1886–1948), American poet and magazine editor

== Fictional characters ==
- Newton Pulsifer, a character in the 1990 novel Good Omens

== Supreme Court of the United States ==
- Pulsifer v. United States, a court case during the 2023–2024 October term of the Supreme Court of the United States

== Other uses ==
- Erythranthe pulsiferae, a plant also known as Pulsifer's monkeyflower

== See also ==
- Pulsipher (disambiguation)
