= Charles Eaton =

Charles Eaton may refer to:

- Charles Eaton (American actor) (1910–2004), American actor
- Charles Eaton (British actor) (fl. 1935–1940), British actor
- Charles Aubrey Eaton (1868–1953), American politician
- Charles Edward Eaton (1916–2006), American poet
- Charles Frederick Eaton (1842–1930), American artist and landscape designer
- Gai Eaton (Charles le Gai Eaton, 1921–2010), Swiss-British thinker on Islam
- Charles Ormston Eaton (1827–1907), English banker, landowner and cricketer
- Charles Warren Eaton (1857–1937), American artist
- Charles Eaton (RAAF officer) (1895–1979), Australian air force aviator
- Chuck Eaton (born 1969), judge on the Fulton County Superior Court, Atlanta, Georgia
- Charles Eaton (1833 ship), a barque which got wrecked in the Torres Strait in 1834
