= Kenneth Porter =

Kenneth Porter may refer to:

- Kenneth Porter (poet) (1905–1981), American poet and historian
- Kenneth Porter (RAF officer) (1912–2003)
- Kenneth Lee Porter (1896–1988), World War I flying ace
