= Earl Marlatt =

American poet

Earl Bowman Marlatt (May 24, 1892 Columbus, Indiana – June 13, 1976 Winchester, Indiana) was an American theologian and poet.

== Life ==
He graduated from DePauw University. He served in World War I and graduated from Boston University School of Theology. In 1923, he began teaching in the Boston University. From 1945 to 1957, he taught at Southern Methodist University's Perkins School of Theology.

He wrote many hymns, one of the best known being Are Ye Able. He also collected church hymns, with the intent to establish a museum. He was a friend of Katherine Lee Bates. His work appeared in Poetry Magazine,

Many of his papers are held at DePauw University. A signed manuscript of his hymn Are Ye Able actually written Feb. 23, 1926, is included in the Bridwell Library Manuscript and Documents Collection.

He died at his home in Winchester, Indiana on June 13, 1976.

== Awards ==
- 1970/71 Poet Laureate of Indiana
- Golden Rose Award

== Works ==
=== Poetry ===
- Chapel Windows. Earl Bowman Marlatt. 1924.
- Protestant Saints. H. Holt and company. 1928.
- Lands Away. Abingdon-Cokesbury press. 1944.
- Cathedral. Harper and Brothers Publishers. 1937.

=== Editor ===
- Jeremiah Bascom Reeves; Earl Marlatt; Charles Arthur Boyd (eds.). Lyric religion: the romance of immortal hymns. The Century co.

=== Theology ===
- What is a Person?. Boston University. 1925.
- "The Eternal Design". Religion in Life. Abingdon Press. 1943.

=== Autobiography ===
- Earl Marlatt; Edwin V O'Neel (1977). The Return of the Native: An Autobiography of Dr. Earl Bowman Marlatt, 1892–1976. Winchester, Indiana: Exponent Publishers.
