= Frances Frost =

American poet

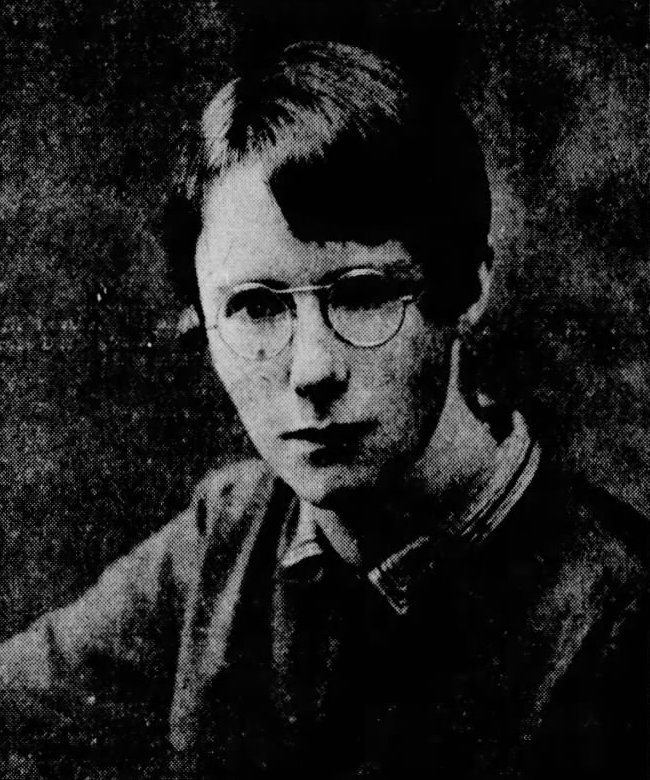
- Born: August 3, 1905; St. Albans, Vermont
- Died: February 11, 1959 (aged 53); New York City, New York
- Education: Middlebury College, University of Vermont

Signature
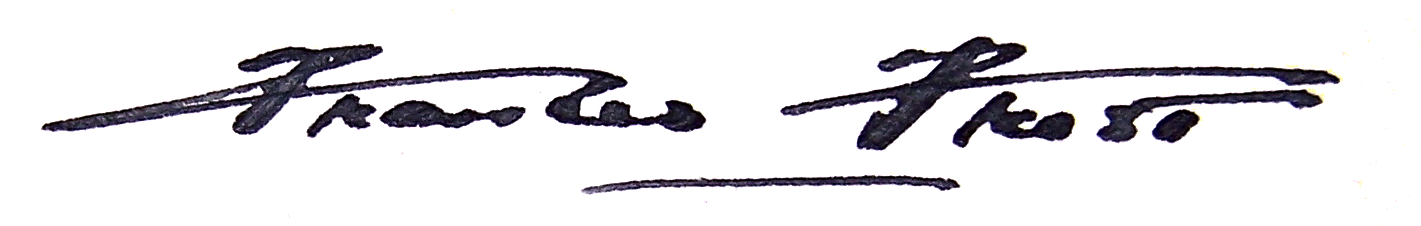

Frances Mary Frost (August 3, 1905 – February 11, 1959) was an American poet, novelist, and children's writer. She was the mother of poet Paul Blackburn.

== Career ==
John C. Farrar, then-editor of The Bookman and a fellow Vermont native, accepted Frost's poem "Memory" in 1927 while she was still a junior at Middlebury College; it was the first of her poems to see professional publication. Moving to Burlington, Vermont that same year, she worked as an editor for the Burlington Daily News, taught courses in poetry at the University of Vermont, and authored several collections of poetry—including Hemlock Wall (1929), for which she received the Yale Younger Poets Award.

From 1931 to 1937 Frost was a summer resident at MacDowell, where she worked on further poetry collections including These Acres (1932). During this period she served as the editor of the brief-lived American Poetry Journal (1933-1935).

Frost's poetry was widely-published in her lifetime, appearing in The New York Herald Tribune, The Atlantic, Virginia Quarterly, The Saturday Evening Post, Good Housekeeping, Ladies' Home Journal, The New Yorker, Harper's, and Saturday Review, among others. She saw eleven poetry collections published (four intended for children), as well as five novels and numerous children's books.

== Personal life ==
Frost was born in St. Albans, Vermont. She attended Middlebury College from 1923 to 1926 and graduated from the University of Vermont in 1931, earning a Bachelor of Philosophy. At Middlebury she joined Delta Delta Delta.

She married William Gordon Blackburn of St. Albans on April 4, 1926, later filing for divorce in 1931. They had two children, Paul Blackburn (U.S. poet) and Sister Marguerite Blackburn. She married Samuel Gaillard Stoney of Charleston, South Carolina, another resident of MacDowell, on September 18, 1933, whom she would also later divorce. By 1939 she had moved to New York City. In 1941 her son moved in with her and Noreen Carr Grace, her lover, in Greenwich Village after having lived primarily in the care of Frost's parents in St. Albans for several years. After Frost's death to cancer in 1959, N. Carr Grace was the executrix of her estate with co-executor Paul Blackburn.

Her papers are held at University of California, San Diego, and Yale University.

== Awards ==
- 1929 Yale Younger Poets Award
- 1933 O. Henry Award for "The Heart Being Perished"
- 1933 Golden Rose Award
- 1933/1934 Shelley Memorial Award

== Works ==
=== Poetry ===
- Hemlock Wall (Yale University Press, 1929); Yale Series of Younger Poets reprint, 1971
- Blue Harvest (Houghton Mifflin, 1931)
- These Acres (Houghton Mifflin, 1932)
- Woman of this Earth (Houghton Mifflin, 1934)
- Road to America (Farrar & Rinehart, 1937)
- Mid-Century (New York: Creative Age Press, 1946), OCLC 2959913
- Song For April (circa 1950) Found in an old scrapbook in 2020
- This Rowdy Heart (Golden Quill, 1954)

=== Fiction ===
- Innocent Summer (Farrar & Rinehart, 1936)
- Yoke of Stars (Farrar & Rinehart, 1938)
- Uncle Snowball (Farrar & Rinehart, 1939)
- Kate Trimingham (Farrar & Rinehart, 1940)
- Village of Glass (Farrar & Rinehart, 1942)

=== Children's poetry ===
- Pool in the Meadow: Poems for Young and Old (Houghton Mifflin, 1933)
- Christmas in the Woods, illustrated by Aldren A. Watson (Harper & Brothers, 1942)
- Christmas is Shaped Like Stars, illus. Garry MacKenzie (T. Y. Crowell, 1948)
- The Little Whistler, illus. Roger Duvoisin (Whittlesey, 1949)
- The Little Naturalist, illus. Kurt Werth (Whittlesey, 1959)

=== Children's fiction ===
- Then Came Timothy, illus. Richard Bennett (Whittlesey, 1950)
- The Cat that Went to College, illus. Morgan Dennis (Whittlesey,1951)
- Little Fox, illus. Morgan Dennis (Whittlesey, 1952)
- Amahl and the Night Visitors, illus. Duvoisin (Whittlesey, 1952) — narrative adaptation of the 1951 Christmas opera by Gian Carlo Menotti
- Rocket Away!, illus. Paul Galdone (Whittlesey, 1953), foreword by Robert R. Coles, Chairman of the Hayden Planetarium
- Star of Wonder, illus. Galdone (Whittlesey, 1953), by Frost and Robert R. Coles
- The Little Donkey, illus. Oleg Zinger (Whittlesey, 1959) — translated from the work of Oleg Zinger and Ilse Windmuller

==== The Windy Foot series ====
- Windy Foot at the County Fair, illus. Lee Townsend (McGraw-Hill, 1947)
- Sleigh Bells for Windy Foot, illus. Townsend (Whittlesey, 1948)
- Maple Sugar for Windy Foot, illus. Townsend (McGraw-Hill, 1950)
- Fireworks for Windy Foot, illus. Townsend (McGraw-Hill, 1956)

=== As editor ===
- American Poetry Journal (Leonard Twinem, 1933-1935)
- Legends of the United Nations (Whittlesey, 1943)
