= Golden Rose Award =

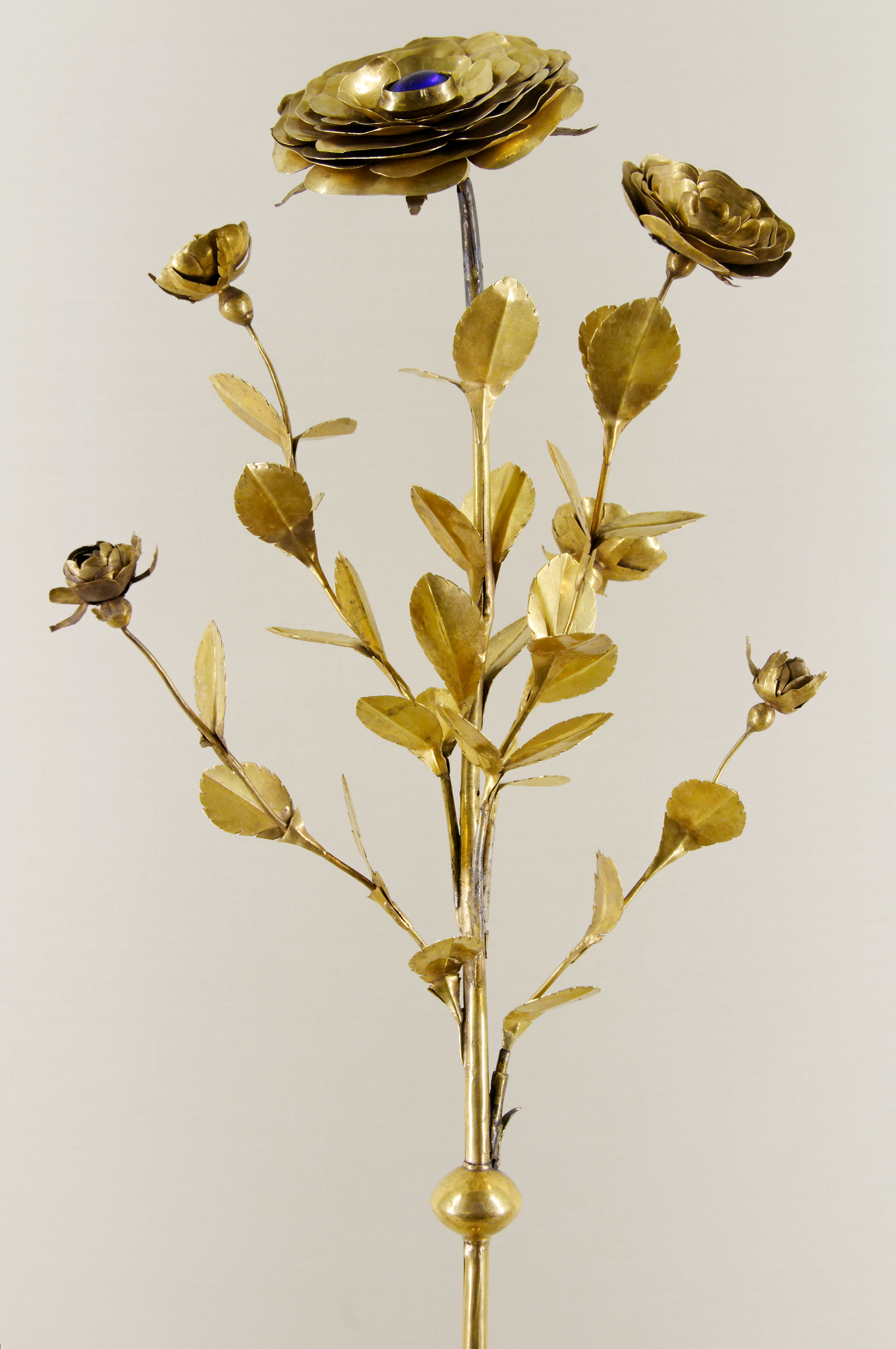
The Basel Golden Rose, namesake of the award

The Golden Rose Award, one of America’s oldest literary prizes, was inaugurated in 1919. The rose was modeled after the Gold Rose which is now in the Cluny Museum in Paris. The New England Poetry Club awards the Rose annually for American poetry.

== List of winners ==
Earl Marlatt	Marshall Schact
Katharine Lee Bates	Robert Frost
Joseph Auslander	Nancy Byrd Turner
Robert Hillyer	S. Foster Damon
Frances Frost	Archibald MacLeish
Gretchen Osgood Warren	Robert P. T. Coffin
John Hall Wheelock	John Holmes
Leonora Speyer	Kenneth Porter
David McCord	Robert Francis
Amos Wilder	Theodore Spencer
May Sarton	David Morton
John Ciardi	William Rose Benet
Richard Eberhart	Richard Wilbur
Harry Elmore Hurd	Harold Trowbridge Pulsifer
Frances Minturn Howard	Dorothy Burnham Eaton
Samuel French Morse	Norma Farber
Morris Bishop	Mark Van Doren
Edwin Honig	Howard Nemerov
Dudley Fitts	Robert Lowell
Abbie Huston Evans	Louis Untermeyer
Elizabeth Coatsworth	L.E. Sissman
Allen Grossman	Stanley Kunitz
Constance Carrier	Charles Edward Eaton
Barbara Howes	X.J. Kennedy
Robert Penn Warren	Robert Fitzgerald
Maxine Kumin	J.V. Cunningham
John Updike	William Jay Smith
Peter Viereck	James Merrill
Galway Kinnell	May Swenson
Philip Levine	John Hollander
Derek Walcott	Donald Hall
W.S. Merwin	Marge Piercy
Adrienne Rich	Seamus Heaney
F.D. Reeve	Frank Bidart
Czeslaw Milosz	Mary Oliver
William Meredith	Robert Creeley
Robert Pinsky	Sharon Olds
Lawrence Ferlinghetti	David Ferry
Carolyn Forché	Charles Simic
Mark Strand	Naomi Shihab Nye
Stephen Sandy	Jean Valentine
Fanny Howe	Marilyn Nelson
