= Harry Elmore Hurd =

American writer

- Born: April 23, 1889; New Hampshire, United States
- Died: August 21, 1958 (aged 69); Haverhill, Massachusetts
- Education: Boston University; Harvard University
- Occupations: Poet; minister

Harry Elmore Hurd (April 23, 1889 – August 21, 1958) was an American poet and minister.

== Life ==
Harry Hurd was born on April 23, 1889, in New Hampshire. He graduated from Boston University in 1916 and Harvard University in 1922. He was a Chaplain, First Lieutenant with the 33rd Engineers during World War I. He was a minister in Methodist and Congregational churches for eighteen years, in Haverhill, Quincy, and Reading.

Hurd died on August 21, 1958, in Haverhill, Massachusetts.

== Publications ==
His work was publisher in Prairie Schooner, Overland Monthly, Voices, Saturday Review,

== Awards ==
- Golden Rose Award

== Works ==
- "Autumn Trail". The New Hampshire Troubadour. September 1947. Archived from the original on 2011-07-14.

=== Books ===
- Yankee boundaries: Poems. J. Day Co. 1949.
- "Desert Sky Hawks". Improvement Era 1936. XXXIX (7). July 1936. Archived from the original on 2007-08-11.
- West of Eden. Boston, MA: Harry Elmore Hurd. 1934.
- West of East. Priv. print. 1934.
- Mountains & Molehills: Essays and Poems. R.G. Badger. 1926.
- Possessions of a Sky Pilot. The Four Seas Company. 1923.

=== Anthologies ===
- Lowry Charles Wimberly, ed. (1943). Prairie schooner caravan; an anthology. University of Nebraska press.
- Poet lore. Vol. 47. Writer's Center. 1941.
- Thomas Curtis Clark, ed. (1938). The golden book of religious verse: the golden book of faith. Garden City publishing co.
