= The Outlook (New York City) =

Weekly magazine (1870–1935)

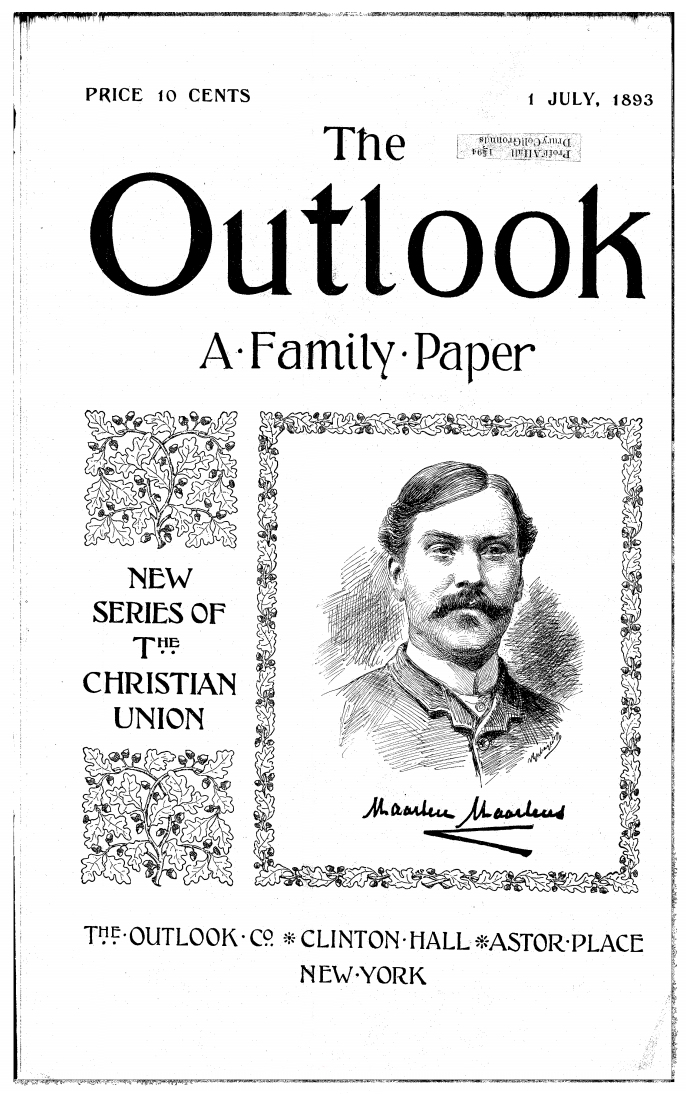
- Cover of The Outlook, July 1, 1893
- Categories: News
- Frequency: Weekly
- Founded: 1870
- Final issue: 1935
- Country: United States
- Based in: New York City
- Language: English

The Outlook (1870–1935) was a weekly magazine, published in New York City.

== Publication history ==
=== The Christian Union (1870–1893) ===
The Outlook began publication January 1, 1870, as The Christian Union (1870–1893).

=== The Outlook (1893–1928) ===
The magazine was titled The Outlook from 1893 to 1928, reflecting a shift of focus from religious subjects to social and political issues. It included periodicals by Lyman Abbott voicing anti-suffrage opinions about women.

In 1900, the ranking weekly magazines of news and opinion were The Independent (1870), The Nation (1865), The Outlook (1870), and, with a different emphasis, The Literary Digest (1890).

=== The Outlook and Independent (1928–1932) ===
In 1928 The Independent was merged with The Outlook to form The Outlook and Independent.

=== The New Outlook (1932–1935) ===
From 1932 to 1935 the magazine was published as The New Outlook. Its last issue was dated June 1935.

== Notable contributors ==
- Theodore Roosevelt was an associate editor for The Outlook, after he served as president.
- Edwin Arlington Robinson
- In 1900 Booker T. Washington published autobiographical pieces in The Outlook. These pieces were collected in book form and published in 1901 as Up from Slavery. A report by Washington about the new state of Oklahoma was published in the first issue of 1908.
- Alfred Emanuel Smith, Francis Rufus Bellamy, and Harold Trowbridge Pulsifer were editors.
- Oscar Cesare was an editorial cartoonist for the magazine.
- Benjamin Kidd's interview article, "Future of the United States" (September 1, 1894) made him a celebrity in the United States.
- Robert Cantwell was literary editor of The New Outlook (1932–1935)
- Charles Barzillai Spahr (1860-1904), editor from 1886

== Anthologies ==
A collection of poetry from The Outlook, Scribner's Magazine, Harper's Magazine, and The Century Magazine was published in 1913.

== See also ==
- The Nation (1865)
- The Independent (1870)
- The Literary Digest (1890)
