= Charles Townsend Copeland =

American professor, poet, and writer

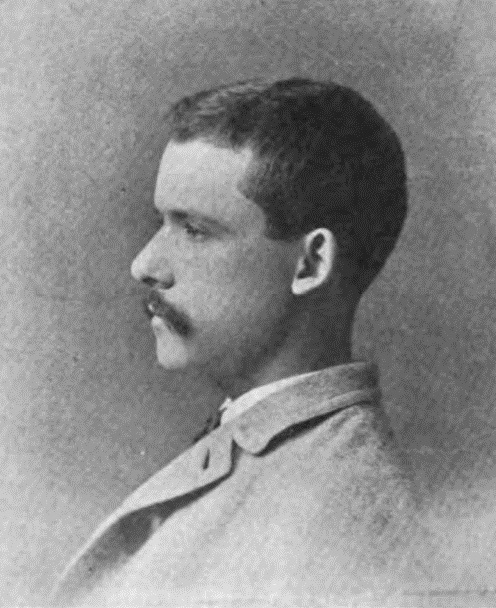
- Born: April 27, 1860
- Died: July 24, 1952 (aged 92)
- Alma mater: Harvard University
- Occupation: Anglicist; writer
- Employer: Harvard University

Charles Townsend Copeland (April 27, 1860 in Calais, Maine – July 24, 1952) was an American professor, poet, and writer.

He graduated from Harvard University in 1882. Copeland taught at a boarding school for a year, followed by a year teaching at Harvard Law School. He then became a theater critic and book reviewer for nine years.

Copeland returned to Harvard in 1893 as an instructor of English. He was promoted to assistant professor in 1917 and served as the Boylston Professor of Rhetoric from 1925 to 1928. He also taught at the Harvard Extension School. Known as "Copey" by many of his peers and admirers, he became known for his Harvard poetry readings in the 1920s and 1930s.

In her autobiography, The Story of My Life, Helen Keller paid high praise to Copeland as an instructor. He also allowed Keller to submit drafts of her autobiography in lieu of regular class assignments.

== See also ==
- List of covers of Time magazine (1920s)
