= Paul Blackburn (poet) =

American poet (1926–1971)

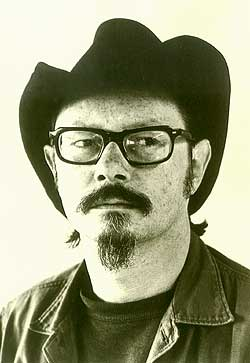
- Paul Blackburn circa 1969-70
- Born: November 24, 1926; St. Albans, Vermont, US
- Died: September 13, 1971 (aged 44); Cortland, New York, US
- Occupations: Poet; translator; teacher; editor
- Children: 1

Paul Blackburn (November 24, 1926 – September 13, 1971) was an American poet. He influenced contemporary literature through his poetry, translations and the encouragement and support he offered to fellow poets.

== Biography ==
Blackburn was born in St. Albans, Vermont. His parents, William Gordon Blackburn and Frances Frost (also a poet, novelist and author of children's books), separated when Blackburn was three and a half. Thereafter, he was cared for primarily by his maternal grandparents on their farm in St. Albans until he was fourteen, when his mother took him to New York City to live with her in Greenwich Village. He began writing poetry in his late teens under her encouragement.

Shortly after enrolling in New York University in 1945, Blackburn joined the army hoping to be sent overseas. The war ended soon after however, and he spent the rest of his service as a laboratory technician in Colorado. In 1947 he returned to NYU, transferring in 1949 to the University of Wisconsin, and graduating in 1950.

It was during these college years that Blackburn first became influenced by Ezra Pound, and began corresponding with him while at the University of Wisconsin. He hitchhiked to Washington, D.C. several times to visit him at St. Elizabeth's Hospital. Through Pound, he came into contact with Robert Creeley, which led to links with Cid Corman, Denise Levertov, Charles Olson, Joel Oppenheimer and Jonathan Williams. Through Creeley came an ancillary involvement with the first two issues of Creeley's magazine, Black Mountain Review, which resulted in the occasional inclusion of Blackburn in the Black Mountain school of poets. The introduction to the Collected Poems states, "Blackburn always opposed the division of poets into schools and did not like the role of Black Mountain poet into which he was cast by Donald Allen's anthology The New American Poetry (1960). He embraced all types of poetry, citing the value of 'all work, if you work 'em right.'" (E. Jarolim in The Collected Poems Of Paul Blackburn, 1985).

It was also Pound who pointed Blackburn in the direction of Provençal poetry, and he studied the languages of Provence while at the University of Wisconsin. His work on Provençal translations intensified following the 1953 publication of a slim selection of the poems from Divers Press, and the awarding the following year of a Fulbright Fellowship to study Provençal language and literature in France. He continued translating Provençal poetry for the rest of his life. It wasn't until after his death that the work was fully published.

Blackburn was also well known for his translations from Spanish of the medieval epic Poema del Mio Cid, of poetry by Federico García Lorca, Octavio Paz, and Pablo Picasso, and of the short stories of Julio Cortázar. He was for a time Cortázar's literary agent in the United States.

Blackburn played an important part in the poetry community, particularly in New York, where he helped fledgling poets develop. He provided logistical and emotional support for writers coming to the city and opportunities to read for both unknown and established writers in the various reading series with which he was involved. He organized readings that offered work from the Beats, the New York School, the Deep Image Poets, and the Black Mountain Poets. Clayton Eshleman has written, "Many, not just a few, but many poets alive today are beholden to him for a basic artistic kindness, for readings, yes, and for advice, but more humanly for a kind of comradeship that very few poets are willing to give." The readings Blackburn organized were the direct progenitors to the St. Mark's Poetry Project on Bowery. Additionally, Blackburn's commitment to recording readings that he organized and attended produced the most comprehensive oral history of the New York poetry scene between the late 1950s and 1970.

Until the mid-1960s Blackburn supported himself through various print-shop, editorial and translating jobs, including a short stint as poetry editor of The Nation. Some of his early jobs included working in-house on encyclopedias and writing free-lance reviews. In the mid-60s he had a show on WBAI with interviews of, and readings by, poets. He began receiving offers of teaching positions, and in 1965, 1966 and 1967 he directed workshops at the Aspen Writers' Conference. He was Poet-In-Residence at City College of New York in 1966–67. A Guggenheim Fellowship in 1967 enabled him to return to Europe to work on his translations and poetry. Upon returning to the U.S. he supported himself through reading tours and teaching at the New School and the State University of New York at Cortland.

Blackburn was married three times: to Winifred Grey McCarthy from 1954 to 1958; Sara Golden from 1963 to 1967; and Joan Diane Miller in 1968, with whom he had a son, Carlos T., in 1969.

Paul Blackburn died of esophageal cancer in Cortland, New York, September 1971.

Though Blackburn never set out to fully articulate his poetics, a good summation is the 1954 piece Statement.

In his lifetime Blackburn published thirteen books of original poetry, as well as five major works of translation. Twelve other books were published posthumously.

== Bibliography ==
- The Dissolving Fabric (Divers Press, 1955, reprinted Mother/Island (Toronto), 1966)
- Brooklyn-Manhattan Transit: A Bouquet for Flatbush (Totem Press, 1960)
- The Nets (Totem Press, 1961)
- 16 Sloppy Haiku and a Lyric for Robert Reardon (Rabbit Press, 1966)
- Sing Song (Caterpillar, 1966)
- The Reardon Poems (Perishable Press, 1967)
- The Cities (Grove Press, 1967)
- In. On. Or About The Premises (Grossman/Cape Goliard, (1968)
- Two New Poems (Perishable Press, 1969)
- The Assassination of President McKinley (Perishable Press, 1970)
- Three Dreams and an Old Poem (Beau Fleuve, 1970)
- Gin: Four Journal Pieces (Perishable Press, 1970)
- The Journals: Blue Mounds Entries (Perishable Press, 1971)
- Halfway Down the Coast (Mulch Press, 1975) (ISBN 0913142093)
- Early Selected Y Mas: Poems 1949-1966 (Black Sparrow Press, 1977) (ISBN 0876851200)
- The Journals, ed. Robert Kelly (Black Sparrow Press, 1977) (ISBN 0876852398)
- By Ear (Magazine, 1978)
- Against the Silences (Permanent Press, 1980) (ISBN 0905258061)
- The Selection of Heaven (Perishable Press, 1980)
- The Collected Poems of Paul Blackburn, ed. Edith Jarolim (Persea, 1985) (ISBN 0892550864)
- The Parallel Voyages (SUN/gemini Press, 1987) (ISBN 0933313020)
- The Selected Poems of Paul Blackburn, ed. Edith Jarolim (Persea, 1989) (ISBN 0892551232)

== Translations ==
- Proensa (Divers Press, 1953)
- Poem of the Cid (1966, reprinted 1998 ISBN 0-8061-3022-9)
- End of the Game and Other Stories by Julio Cortázar (1967) (ISBN 0060906375)
- Hunk of Skin by Pablo Picasso (1968)
- Cronopios and Famas by Julio Cortázar (1969; 1999) (ISBN 0811214028)
- Proensa: An Anthology of Troubadour Poetry, ed. George Economou (U of California Press, 1978)
- Lorca/Blackburn: Poems of Federico García Lorca (Momo's Press, 1979, reprinted Stop Press, 2000)
- The Collected Poems of Octavio Paz 1957-1987 (contributor) (1991) (ISBN 9780811211734)
