= Marshall Schact =

American poet (1905–1956)

- Born: Marshall Walter Schact; September 23, 1905; Brookline, Massachusetts, U.S.
- Died: November 21, 1956 (aged 51)
- Occupation: Poet
- Writing career
- Notable awards: Golden Rose Award

Marshall Walter Schacht (September 23, 1905 – November 21, 1956) was an American poet. He was born in Brookline, Massachusetts.

== Life ==
His work appeared in Poetry Magazine, the New Yorker.

He corresponded with George Davis Snell, a college classmate, and Robert Francis.

He lived in New York City.

== Awards ==
- Golden Rose Award
- 1949 Twayne first book contest

== Works ==
- Fingerboard: poems. New York: Twayne Publishers, Inc. 1949.

=== Anthology ===
- Oscar Williams, ed. (1946). A Little Treasury of Modern Poetry. New York: Scribner's. ISBN 0-684-41489-9.
- New Poets. Prairie City, Illinois: The Press of James A. Decker. 1941.
- Macha Louis Rosenthal, ed. (1967). The new poets: American and British poetry since World War II. Oxford University Press. ISBN 0-19-500741-7.

=== Criticism ===
- "Robert P. Tristram: A review of Maine Ballads". Poetry. LIII (II): 92–96. November 1938.
