= Frances Minturn Howard =

American poet

Frances Minturn Howard (March 15, 1905 New York City – July 23, 1995 Boston) was an American poet.

== Life ==
She studied sculpture in Italy.

In 1957, she met and corresponded with May Sarton. In 1959, Sylvia Plath came to dinner.

She was published in Virginia Quarterly Review, Saturday Review, AGNI, The New Yorker, Poetry Magazine,

She was married to Thomas Clark Howard and lived at 46 Mount Vernon Street. Beacon Hill, Boston. Earlier in their marriage, they had lived in New York City and Providence, Rhode Island. They also maintained a summer house on Rhode Island Avenue, in Newport, Rhode Island.

== Awards ==
- 1955 Golden Rose Award
- 1957 Reynolds Lyric Award

== Works ==
- "Heron in Swamp; The True and Happy Fable of Beauty and the Beast; The Sleeping Beauty" (PDF). Beloit Poetry Journal. 9. Summer 1959.

=== Poetry ===
- Sleep without Armor. Dutton. 1953.
- All Keys are Glass. Dutton. 1950.

=== Anthologies ===
- Bonner, Amy, ed. (1946). "Foundation; Martyr". The Poetry Society of America anthology. Ayer Publishing. ISBN 978-0-8369-6003-7.
- Cane, Melville, ed. (1960). The golden year: the Poetry Society of America anthology (1910-1960). Fine Editions Press. ISBN 0-8369-6004-1.
- PEN (Organization), ed. (1966). New poems. Michael Joseph.

=== Non-fiction ===
- Beacon Hill, Hub of the Universe: Hub of the Universe. Mark Kelley (illus.). Yankee. 1977. ISBN 978-0-911658-77-4.
- Frances Minturn Howard; McKay, Ruth C.; Beacon Hill Garden Club; Kalischer, Clemens; Beacon Hill Garden Club (1972). Hidden Gardens of Beacon Hill. Clemens Kalischer (illus.). Beacon Hill Garden Club.
