= Joseph McKean (academic) =

- Born: 19 April 1776; Ipswich, Province of Massachusetts, British America
- Died: 17 March 1818 (aged 41); Boston, Massachusetts, US
- Education: Harvard University

Joseph McKean (19 April 1776 – 17 March 1818) was the second holder of the Boylston Professorship of Rhetoric and Oratory at Harvard University. He was also the seventh librarian of the Massachusetts Historical Society, occupying that position from October 1809, to April, 1812. It was during this time that he created the first catalog of the Boston Athenæum.

== Biography ==
McKean's family immigrated from Glasgow, Scotland, in 1763. McKean prepared for the university at Phillips Academy in Andover and entered Harvard College in 1790 at fourteen. Legend has it that it was McKean who, during his undergraduate years, brought a pig to his room in Hollis thereby founding Harvard's Porcellian Club. Upon graduation with honors in 1794, he returned to Ipswich to teach and study theology. A year later he moved to Berwick and then finally back to Boston to prepare for the ministry with Rev. Dr. John Eliot. Ordained in 1794, he accepted a position at the Congregational Church in Milton where he stayed until 1804 when poor health obliged him to beg relief from his pastoral duties. In 1800 he married Amy Swasey, the daughter of Bunker Hill legend, Major Joseph Swasey.

In 1806 McKean was offered the Hollis Chair of Mathematics and Natural Philosophy at Harvard after the chair had been declined by Nathaniel Bowditch. In the event, McKean also declined and the chair eventually went to John Farrar. Two years later on October 31, 1809, McKean did accept the appointment as the second Boylston Professorship of Rhetorick and Oratory when the first Boylston Professor, John Quincy Adams, resigned in order to become the federal government's minister to Russia

Milton Academy was established by an act of the Massachusetts Legislature on March 3, 1798, "...for the purpose of promoting piety, religion & morality & for the education of youth in such Languages, & in such of the liberal arts & sciences, as the Trustees of the said Academy shall direct..." As part of this legislation, McKean was appointed a Trustee of Milton Academy along with Fisher Ames, William Aspinwall, Samuel Bass, Nathaniel Emmons, Thadeus Mason Harris, Zachariah Howard, George Morey, Eliphalet Porter, Thomas Thatcher, Stephen Metcalf, John Read, Edward Robbins, and Ebenezer Thayer.

Late in 1818, on the recommendation of his doctor and to escape Boston's winter, McKean traveled to Havana where he died. His library was auctioned off on Friday, August 21, 1818, by Blake & Cunningham at “No. 93 Court Street, next door to Barditt's Book-Store.” The catalog of the auction runs to 51 pages and lists 1,541 titles among which are a number in mathematics, chemistry, astronomy, and archaeology.

== The First Catalog of the Boston Athenæum ==
Joseph McKean was never the librarian of the Boston Athenæum but he did compile its first catalog. The 266-page book organizes the approximately 3,500 titles in the collection into fifteen classes including Theology, Law, Mathematics and Natural Philosophy, Chemistry and Mineralogy, and Poetry and Dramatic Works. McKean's estate was paid $100 for his efforts. In the telling of a tract by Athenæum staff member, James Belliveau, it was McKean who added a hand-written letter K to the title page of a large number of the books listed in the 1810 catalog. The K was the starting point for the bibliographic detective story told in the K equals X tract that ended up identifying these books as being the library of Henry Knox which was purchased from Knox's estate in 1810. The Henry Knox Collection is one of a number of personal libraries in the Boston Athenæum's rare books and manuscripts collection.
