= Marjorie Rusche =

American composer (born 1949)

Marjorie Maxine Rusche (born 18 November 1949) is an American composer, conductor, and pianist who has composed several operas and was a founding member of the Minnesota Composers Forum (known today as the American Composers Forum).

== Biography ==
Rusche was born in Sturgeon Bay, Wisconsin. She earned a M.A. from the University of Minnesota (Minneapolis) and a D.M.A. from Indiana University. Her teachers included Dominick Argento and Paul Fetler.

Rusche served in the U.S. Peace Corps in Kenya. Over the years, she has taught various music courses at Columbia College Chicago; Indiana University South Bend; Saint Mary’s College; Southwestern Michigan College; and the University of Notre Dame.

Rusche has received awards, commissions, and grants from: American Chamber Opera Company, New York City; Columbia College Chicago Follett Fellowship; DANCECIRCUS, Milwaukee, Wisconsin; DuPage Chorale/American Composers Forum (Chicago chapter); Gotham Ensemble, New York City; Indiana Music Teachers Association Convention; Indiana State Arts Board Individual Composer Fellowship; Indiana University Curriculum Development Grant; Indianapolis Symphonic Choir; Jerome Foundation, St. Paul, Minnesota; Masterworks Chorale, Muncie, Indiana; McKnight Foundation, St. Paul; Meet The Composer-Midwest; Meet The Composer-New York; Minnesota Composers Forum/Jerome Foundation; Minnesota State Arts Board; Portland, Oregon, Regional Arts Commission Grant; Saint Mary’s College Women’s Choir; Schubert Club, St. Paul; Skylight Comic Opera Theater, Milwaukee; South Bend Chamber Singers; South Bend Symphony Orchestra; University of Notre Dame Chorale; and USA Projects, Artists2Artists Fund, USA Open Matching Fund, Cheswyter Music Commissioning Fund (American Composers Forum) and 30 individual donors.

A charter member of the Minnesota Composers Forum (today known as the American Composers Forum), Rusche also belongs to the American Society of Composers, Authors, and Publishers (ASCAP), College Music Society, International Alliance for Women in Music, New Music USA, and Opera America.

Rusche composes in many different genres. Her works have been broadcast and performed internationally and throughout the United States. Her compositions include:

== Chamber ==
- Auld Robin Gray (soprano, flute, piccolo, piano)
- Pentagram (flute and guitar)
- Quintet (flute, clarinet, horn, violin, cello)
- Sonata (flute and piano)
- Talisman (flute)
- Woodwind Trilogy (flute, oboe, clarinet, A clarinet, bassoon)

== Operas ==
- Dance of Death (libretto by Dan Pinkerton)
- Scarlet Letter (libretto after Nathaniel Hawthorne)
- She Stoops to Conquer (libretto by Olivia Goldsmith and Andrew Joffe)

== Orchestra ==
- Concerto for Cor Anglais

== Vocal ==
- After Reading St. John the Divine (text by Gene Derwood)
- An Irish Airman Foresees His Death (text by William Butler Yeats)
- Hanging Man (text by Sylvia Plath)
- I Can Wade Grief (text by Emily Dickinson)
- I Heard a Fly Buzz (text by Emily Dickinson)

- Hear music by Marjorie Rusche
