= Pulsipher =

Pulsipher is an English surname. It may refer to:

- Bill Pulsipher, baseball player
- Lewis Pulsipher, teacher, game designer, and author
- Lindsay Pulsipher, actress
- Scott Pulsipher, academic administrator
- Susan Pulsipher, politician
- Zera Pulsipher, religious leader
- Roicephus "Roy" Pulsipher, fictional character

== Other uses ==
- Juanita Pulsipher Brooks, historian and author

== See also ==
- Pulsifer (disambiguation)
