= Boylston Professorship of Rhetoric and Oratory =

Endowed chair at Harvard University

The Boylston Professorship of Rhetoric and Oratory is an endowed chair at Harvard University. It was established in 1804, and endowed by the will of a Boston merchant, Nicholas Boylston.

Image	Name	Start date	End date	References
	John Quincy Adams	1806	1809	
	Joseph McKean	1809	1818	
	Edward Tyrrel Channing	1819	1851	
	Francis James Child	1851	1876	
	Adams Sherman Hill	1876	1904	
	Le Baron Russell Briggs	1904	1925	
	Charles Townsend Copeland	1925	1928	
	Robert S. Hillyer	1937	1944	
	Theodore Spencer	1946	1949	
	Archibald MacLeish	1949	1962	
	Robert Stuart Fitzgerald	1965	1981	
	Seamus Heaney	1984	1995	
	Jorie Graham	1999	2025	
	Tracy K. Smith	2025		
