= Geoffrey Hill =

English poet (1932–2016)

Sir Geoffrey Hill FRSL
- Born: Geoffrey William Hill; 18 June 1932; Bromsgrove, Worcestershire, England
- Died: 30 June 2016 (aged 84); Cambridge, Cambridgeshire, England
- Education: Keble College, Oxford
- Occupations: Poet; writer; university professor
- Spouse(s): Nancy Whittaker (m. 1956; div. 1983) Alice Goodman (m. 1987)
- Children: 5
- Writing career
- Genre: Poetry
- Notable awards: Truman Capote Award for Literary Criticism

Sir Geoffrey William Hill FRSL (18 June 1932 – 30 June 2016) was an English poet, professor emeritus of English literature and religion, and former co-director of the Editorial Institute at Boston University. Hill has been considered to be among the most distinguished poets of his generation and was called the "greatest living poet in the English language". From 2010 to 2015 he held the position of Professor of Poetry in the University of Oxford. Following his receiving the Truman Capote Award for Literary Criticism in 2009 for his Collected Critical Writings, and the publication of Broken Hierarchies (Poems 1952–2012), Hill is recognised as one of the principal contributors to poetry and criticism in the 20th and 21st centuries.

== Biography ==
Geoffrey Hill was born in Bromsgrove, Worcestershire, England, in 1932, the son of a police constable. When he was six years old, his family moved to nearby Fairfield in Worcestershire, where he attended the local primary school, then the grammar school in Bromsgrove. "As an only child, he developed the habit of going for long walks alone, as an adolescent deliberating and composing poems as he muttered to the stones and trees." On these walks he often carried with him Oscar Williams' A Little Treasury of Modern Poetry (1946), and Hill speculates: "there was probably a time when I knew every poem in that anthology by heart."

In 1950, he was admitted to Keble College, Oxford, to read English, where he published his first poems in 1952, at the age of twenty, in an eponymous Fantasy Press volume (though he had published work in the Oxford Guardian—the magazine of the University Liberal Club—and The Isis).

Upon graduation from the University of Oxford with First-Class Honours, Hill embarked on an academic career, teaching at the University of Leeds from 1954 until 1980, from 1976 as professor of English Literature. After leaving Leeds, he spent a year at the University of Bristol on a Churchill Scholarship before becoming a teaching fellow at Emmanuel College, Cambridge, where he taught from 1981 until 1988.

He then moved to the United States, to serve as University Professor and Professor of Literature and Religion at Boston University. In 2000, with Christopher Ricks, he was co-founder of the Editorial Institute at Boston University, dedicated to training students in editorial method. In 2006, he moved back to Cambridge, England.

Hill was a Christian. He died in Cambridge on 30 June 2016.

== Personal life ==
Hill was married twice. In 1956, he married Nancy Whittaker; together they had four children, eventually divorcing in 1983. In 1987, Hill married Alice Goodman, an American librettist and later an Anglican priest. The couple had a daughter, Alberta. The marriage lasted until Hill's death.

== Awards and honours ==
- 1961: Eric Gregory Award.
- 1971: inaugural Whitbread Award for Poetry and Alice Hunt Bartlett Prize for Mercian Hymns.
- 1988: Honorary D.Litt. degree from the University of Leeds; Ingram Merrill Foundation Award.
- 1998: Hill delivered the Warton Lecture on English Poetry.
- 2009: Truman Capote Award for Literary Criticism for Collected Critical Writings.
- 2012: Hill was created Knight Bachelor by Queen Elizabeth II in Her Majesty's 2012 New Year Honours for services to literature.

He was also an Honorary Fellow of Keble College, Oxford; an Honorary Fellow of Emmanuel College, Cambridge; a Fellow of the Royal Society of Literature; and a Fellow of the American Academy of Arts and Sciences.

=== Oxford Professor of Poetry ===
In March 2010 Hill was confirmed as a candidate in the election of the Professor of Poetry in the University of Oxford, with a broad base of academic support. He was ultimately successful, and delivered his 15 lectures in the academic years 2010 to 2015. The lectures progressed chronologically, beginning with Shakespeare's sonnets and concluding with a critique of Philip Larkin's poem "Church Going".

== Writing ==
Hill's poetry encompasses a variety of styles, from the dense and allusive writing of King Log (1968) and Canaan (1997) through the simplified syntax of the sequence "The Pentecost Castle" in Tenebrae (1978), on to the more accessible poems of Mercian Hymns (1971), a series of 30 poems (sometimes called "prose-poems", a label which Hill rejects in favour of "versets") which juxtapose the history of Offa, eighth-century ruler of the Anglo-Saxon kingdom of Mercia, with Hill's own childhood in the modern Mercia of the West Midlands. Seamus Heaney said of Hill: "He has a strong sense of the importance of the maintenance of speech, a deep scholarly sense of the religious and political underpinning of everything in Britain."

Kenneth Haynes, editor of Broken Hierarchies, commented: "the annotation is not the hard part with Hill's poems... the difficulty only begins after looking things up". Elegy is Hill's dominant mode; he is a poet of phrases rather than cadences. Regarding both his style and subject, Hill is often described as a "difficult" poet. In an interview in The Paris Review (2000), which published Hill's early poem "Genesis" when he was still at Oxford, Hill defended the right of poets to difficulty as a form of resistance to the demeaning simplifications imposed by "maestros of the world".

Hill was consistently drawn to morally problematic and violent episodes in British and European history and has written poetic responses to the Holocaust in English, "Two Formal Elegies", "September Song" and "Ovid in the Third Reich". His accounts of landscape (especially that of his native Worcestershire) are as intense as his encounters with history. Hill has also worked in theatre – in 1978, the National Theatre in London staged his 'version for the English stage' of Brand by Henrik Ibsen, written in rhyming verse. Hill's distaste for conclusion, however, has led him, in 2000's Speech! Speech! (118), to scorn the following argument as a glib get-out: 'ACCESSIBLE / traded as DEMOCRATIC, he answers / as he answers móst things these days | easily.' Throughout his corpus Hill is uncomfortable with the muffling of truth-telling that verse designed to sound well, for its contrivances of harmony, must permit. The constant buffets of Hill's suspicion of lyric eloquence—can it truly be eloquent?—against his talent for it (in Syon, a sky is 'livid with unshed snow') become in the poems a sort of battle in style, where passages of singing force (ToL: 'The ferns / are breast-high, head-high, the days / lustrous, with their hinterlands of thunder') are balanced with prosaic ones of academese and inscrutable syntax. In the long interview collected in Haffenden's Viewpoints there is described the poet warring himself to witness honestly, to make language as tool say truly what he believes is true of the world.

== Criticism ==
The violence of Hill's aesthetic has been criticised by Irish poet and critic Tom Paulin, who draws attention to Hill's use of the Virgilian trope of "rivers of blood" – as also used by Enoch Powell – to suggest that his lyrics draw their energies from an outmoded nationalism, expressed in what Hugh Haughton has described as a "language of the past largely invented by the Victorians".

Hill addressed criticisms of his political and cultural beliefs in a Guardian interview in 2002. There he suggested that his affection for the "radical Tories" of the 19th century, while recently misunderstood as reactionary, was actually evidence of a progressive bent tracing back to his working-class roots. He also indicated that he could no longer draw a firm distinction between "Blairite Labour" and the Thatcher-era Conservatives, lamenting that both parties had become solely oriented toward "materialism". Hill's style has been subjected to parody: Wendy Cope includes a two-stanza parody of the Mercian Hymns entitled "Duffa Rex" in Making Cocoa for Kingsley Amis, published by Faber & Faber.

== Bibliography ==
=== Books of poems ===
- Geoffrey Hill. Oxford: Fantasy Press, 1952. "The Fantasy Poets", no. 11. 8 pp.
- For the Unfallen: Poems 1952–1958. London: André Deutsch Ltd, 1959.
- Preghiere. Leeds: School of English, University of Leeds, 1964. "Northern House Pamphlets Poets" series. Contains 8 poems, all of which were subsequently published in King Log.
- King Log. London: André Deutsch, 1968.
- Mercian Hymns. London: André Deutsch, 1971.
- Tenebrae. London: André Deutsch, 1978.
- The Mystery of the Charity of Charles Péguy. London: Agenda Editions /André Deutsch, 1983.
- Canaan. London: Penguin, 1996.
- The Triumph of Love. London: Penguin, 1997.
- Speech! Speech! Washington, DC: Counterpoint, 2000. Long poem, comprising 120 12-line stanzas
- The Orchards of Syon. Washington DC: Counterpoint, 2002.
- Scenes from Comus. London: Penguin, 2005.
- A Treatise of Civil Power. Thame: Clutag Press, 2005. Limited edition of 400 copies.
- Without Title. London: Penguin, 2006. New Haven: Yale University Press, 2007, ISBN 978-0-300-12176-6.
- A Treatise of Civil Power (London: Penguin, 2007. ("In Penguin's new printing, a number of the book's other poems survive intact, but the "Treatise" has been smashed up, rewritten (or sub-edited) into a number of smaller poems and fragmentary lyrics. Then other stuff's gone in as well". Tim Martin, The Guardian (8 September 2007).
- Oraclau | Oracles: The Daybooks III. Thame: Clutag Press, 2010.
- Clavics: The Daybooks IV. London: Enitharmon Press, 2011.
- Odi Barbare: The Daybooks II. Thame: Clutag Press, 2012.
- The Book of Baruch by the Gnostic Justin. Oxford: Oxford University Press. 17 April 2019. ISBN 978-0-19-882952-2. (Posthumous)

=== Poetry collections and selections ===
- Somewhere Is Such a Kingdom: Poems 1952–1971, introduction by Harold Bloom. Boston: Houghton Mifflin, 1975. (Contains For the Unfallen (1959), King Log (1968), Mercian Hymns (1971)
- Edwin Brock /Geoffrey Hill /Stevie Smith. Penguin Modern Poets, 8. Harmondsworth: Penguin, 1966
- Collected Poems. Harmondsworth: Penguin, 1985. 1st hardback edition, London: André Deutsch, 1986.
- New & Collected Poems, 1952–1992. Boston: Houghton Mifflin, 1994.
- Selected Poems. Harmondsworth: Penguin, 2006. 1st hardback edition, New Haven: Yale University Press, 2010. Published 1 April.
- Broken Hierarchies: Poems 1952–2012, ed. Kenneth Haynes. Oxford: Oxford University Press, November 2013. Includes all published collections, and four hitherto unpublished sections of "The Daybooks": a) Ludo: Epigraphs and Colophons to The Daybooks, b) I. Expostulations on the Volcano, c) II. Liber Illustrium Virorum, d) VI. Al Tempo de' Tremuoti

=== Prose and drama ===
- Brand, by Henrik Ibsen: A Version for the English Stage, trans. Geoffrey Hill. 1978.
- The Lords of Limit: Essays on Literature and Ideas. London: André Deutsch, 1984.
- The Enemy's Country: Words, Contexture, and other Circumstances of Language. Stanford University Press, 1991.
- Style and Faith (2003)
- Collected Critical Writings, ed. Kenneth Haynes. Oxford: Oxford University Press, 2008
