= Nancy Byrd Turner =

American poet

Nancy Byrd Turner (July 29, 1880 – September 5, 1971) was an American poet, editor and lecturer. She was a recipient of the Golden Rose Award and the Virginia Writers' Club's poetry prize.

== Life ==
Nancy Byrd Turner was born in Boydton, Virginia, July 29, 1880. She was the eldest child of Rev. Byrd Thornton and Nancy Turner.

In 1898, she graduated from Hannah More Academy in Maryland and began work as a teacher. During this period her work appeared in several national magazines including the Saturday Evening Post and Scribner's.

In 1917, she moved to Boston to join the editorial staff of The Youth's Companion. By 1922 she was an editor for The Atlantic, The Independent, and Houghton Mifflin. She joined the MacDowell art colony in 1925 and remained there until 1944.

Her first book of poetry, A Riband on My Rein, was published in 1929. Over the course of her career she published 15 books, ranging from adult poetry to children's literature and lyrics. Her work appeared in England and in the United States in such magazines as Good Housekeeping, Harper's Magazine, Ladies' Home Journal, and the New Yorker.

She retired to Ashland, Virginia, to become a lecturer and freelance writer. She died September 5, 1971.

== Awards ==
- 1930 Golden Rose Award, of the New England Poetry Society.
- 1948 Virginia Writers' Club's poetry prize

== Works ==
- "Lincoln". poetryx (archived version). Archived from the original on 2010-02-05.
- "Stars Were Gleaming". The Church of Jesus Christ of Latter-day Saints.

=== Poetry ===
- Magpie Lane: Poems. Harcourt, Brace & Company. 1927.
- A Riband on My Rein, 1929
- Zodiac Town. Atlantic Monthly Press. 1921. ISBN 978-1-4097-1102-5 reprint 2008 (illustrated by Winifred Bromhall)
- The Mother of Washington. Dodd, Mead & Company. 1930.
- A Riband on My Rein: Poems. Dodd, Mead & Company. 1934.
- Star in a Well; Poems. New York: Dodd, Mead and Co. 1935.
- Silver Saturday: Poems for the Home. New York: Dodd, Mead and Co. 1937.
- Poems: Selected and New. Golden Quill Press. 1965.
- When Young Melissa Sweeps: Poem. Peachtree. 1998. ISBN 978-1-56145-157-9.
