= For the Unfallen =

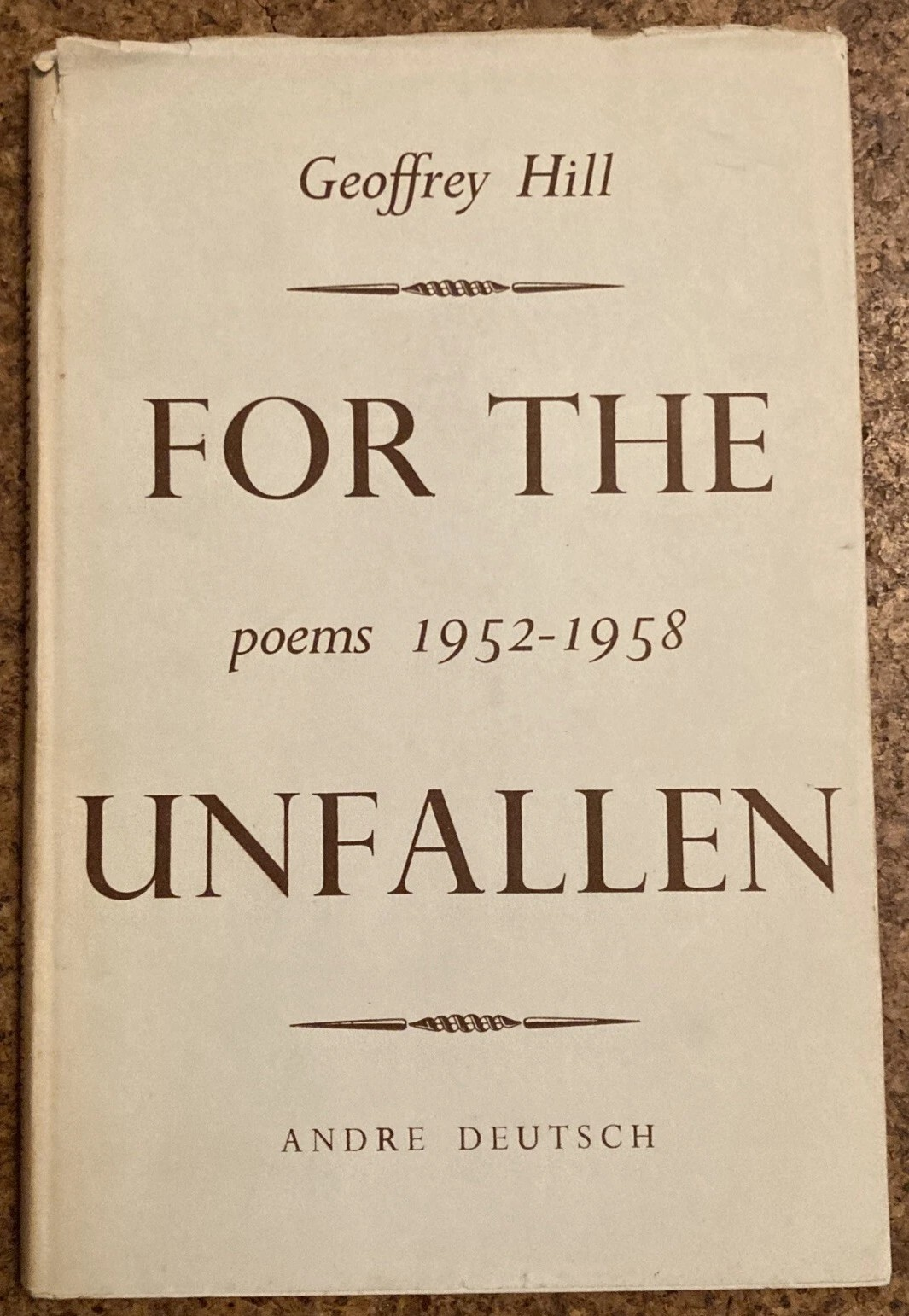
- First edition cover
- Author: Geoffrey Hill
- Language: English
- Genre: Poetry
- Published: 1959 (A. Deutsch)
- Publication place: United Kingdom
- ISBN: 0-571-20275-6

For the Unfallen is a 1959 collection of poems by English poet Geoffrey Hill. The poems in the collection have been described as largely vatic in nature. The collection garnered acclaim upon release, and contains the famous poem "Genesis".

== Contents ==
For the Unfallen contains 29 poems. They are:

- "Genesis"
- "God's Little Mountain"
- "Holy Thursday"
- "Merlin"
- "The Bidden Guest"
- "In Memory of Jane Fraser"
- "The Turtle Dove"
- "The Troublesome Reign"
- "Solomon's Mines"
- "The Distant Fury of Battle"
- "Asmodeus"
- "Requiem for the Plantagenet Kings"
- "Two Formal Elegies"
- "Metamorphoses"
- "Picture of a Nativity"
- "Canticle for Good Friday"
- "The Guardians"
- "The White Ship"
- "Wreaths"
- "Elegiac Stanzas"
- "After Cumae"
- "Little Apocalypse"
- "The Bibliographers"
- "Of Commerce and Society"
- "Doctor Faustus"
- "A Pastoral"
- "Orpheus and Eurydice"
- "In Piam Memoriam"
- "To the (Supposed) Patron"

== Composition ==
The poem "Genesis" was written in 1952. The poems from "Requiem for the Plantagenet Kings" to the work "Of Commerce and Society" were written from 1955 to 1957. The last five poems, which in the words of scholar Vincent B. Sherry "signal a reassessment of the working approaches" in most preceding poems, are from 1958.

== Themes and interpretation of individual poems ==
Sherry argues that throughout the collection, the speaker believes words do not need to have single clear referents. He notes how the poet-speaker in "Genesis" first feels hope about the power of his words to "create a world", then despair when failing to represent surrounding occurrences accurately, and ultimately openness to a word lacking a single reference – and how the last phase is an aspect of the later poem "Holy Thursday" as well.

=== "Genesis" ===
The three lines in Part V of the poem, which start with "By blood we live", are among Hill's more famous lines.

=== "God's Little Mountain" ===
William Logan claimed that this poem is about "the absence of gods, not the presence of devils".

=== "The Bidden Guest" ===
According to David C. Mahan at Yale University, this poem is about a communicant at the Eucharist who experiences "distressed belief": he believes, but cannot truly engage. In Mahan's view, the poem "generates a muted longing for the authentic, a yearning for contact with spiritual reality"; however, it still does not, in Mahan's view, advocate "any easy resolution to the difficulties and ambiguities" of faith. The scholar also questions whether the poem's title refers to a God who has been invited at the rite to attend, or refers to the communicant (who is like a guest in his aloofness).

=== "In Memory of Jane Fraser" ===
A ballad from 1953, John P. Vickery said in the book The Modern Elegiac Temper (2006) that Hill explores the elegiac convention with "a resolute quizzicality" in this poem, refusing both to mourn explicitly and to "exalt his subject extravagantly". Vickery noted that the last stanza is characteristic of an elegy, but that there is a low-keyed rendering of the death. Erica McAlpine, in the book The Poet's Mistake (2020), interpreted the last part of the poem as "a spring that cannot quite console".

Hill strongly disliked the work, and a new version of the poem with a different final line appears in King Log (1968).

=== "The Turtle Dove" ===
Denis Donoghue speculated that this poem is a tribute to John Crowe Ransom's “The Equilibrists”.

=== "Asmodeus" ===
A sequence of two sonnets whose subject is marriage. In the first sonnet Hill dramatizes the isolation of lovers from the real world, their building a house of love based on their mutual self-absorption. The demon Asmodeus is the protagonist of the second sonnet (addressed as 'you') who stands apart, observing, the lovers' world.

== Reception ==
For the Unfallen received very positive reviews. Al Alvarez described the collection as "an extraordinarily fine achievement, one of the three or four important first books of poetry to appear in the fifties." Sherry argued that in the last poems, Hill "turns his dissatisfaction with his own tour de force into an experience both technically and intellectually satisfying for us."

In 2011, Mahan deemed the poem "The Bidden Guest" an example of Hill achieving the “redemptive power” for which Hill later praised George Eliot’s Middlemarch in his critical writings. In 2014, Owen Boynton, an English teacher, referred to the first line of "The Turtle Dove" as a "beautiful chiasmus".

=== "In Memory of Jane Fraser" ===
Of the first part of the poem, Vickery says that "the setting is saved from the charge of sentimentality by the apt concluding military image" of resisting an adversary. Vickery also praised the low-keyed rendering of her death, saying Hill "captures vividly the immediacy of the effect of an actual personal death".

Erica McAlpine, in the book The Poet's Mistake (2020), deemed the last line of the original "somewhat inane", stating the last word was "awkwardly intransitive". She praised the last line in the revised edition as more resonant, writing that the new ending "resumes with deadly vigor the iambic march" that "poignantly slackens" earlier on, and also creates an image more in line with the overall point of the poem.
