= Oscar Cesare =

American cartoonist (1883–1948)

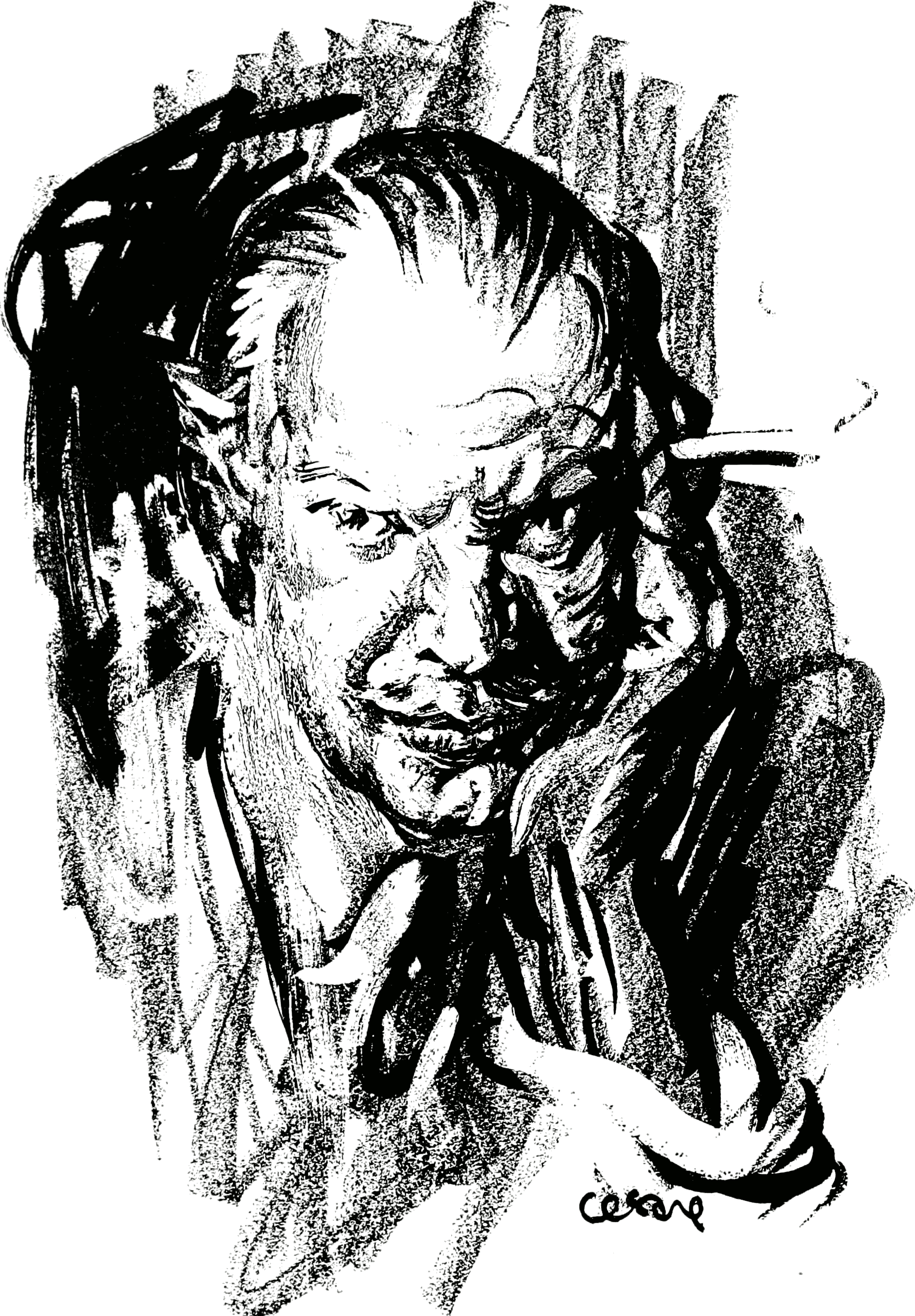
- Self-portrait
- Born: 7 October 1883; Linköping, Sweden
- Died: July 25, 1948 (aged 64); Stamford, Connecticut, U.S.

Oscar Edward Cesare (October 7, 1883 – July 25, 1948) was a Swedish-born American caricaturist, painter, draftsman and editorial cartoonist.

== Biography ==
Cesare was born on 7 October 1883 in Linköping, Sweden. At eighteen he moved to Paris to study art, then traveled to Buffalo, New York, to continue his studies. In 1903 he moved to Chicago, and by 1911 he was living in Manhattan, New York.

One of his first jobs was illustrating The King of Gee-Whiz by Emerson Hough in 1906. By 1913, his success as an illustrator allowed him to exhibit at the legendary 1913 Armory Show. Cesare worked at several publications throughout his career, including the Chicago Tribune, New York World, New York Sun, New York Evening Post, Our World, The Century Magazine, Bookman, Outlook, Nation's Business, Literary Digest, Fortune, and The New Yorker. In 1920, he became a regular contributor to the Sunday magazine of the New York Times and continued until a few years before his death in 1948.

In October 1922 Cesare was invited to the Kremlin to sketch Soviet leader Vladimir Lenin. He was also able to make sketches of Leon Trotsky on the same trip.

He died on July 25, 1948, in Stamford, Connecticut.

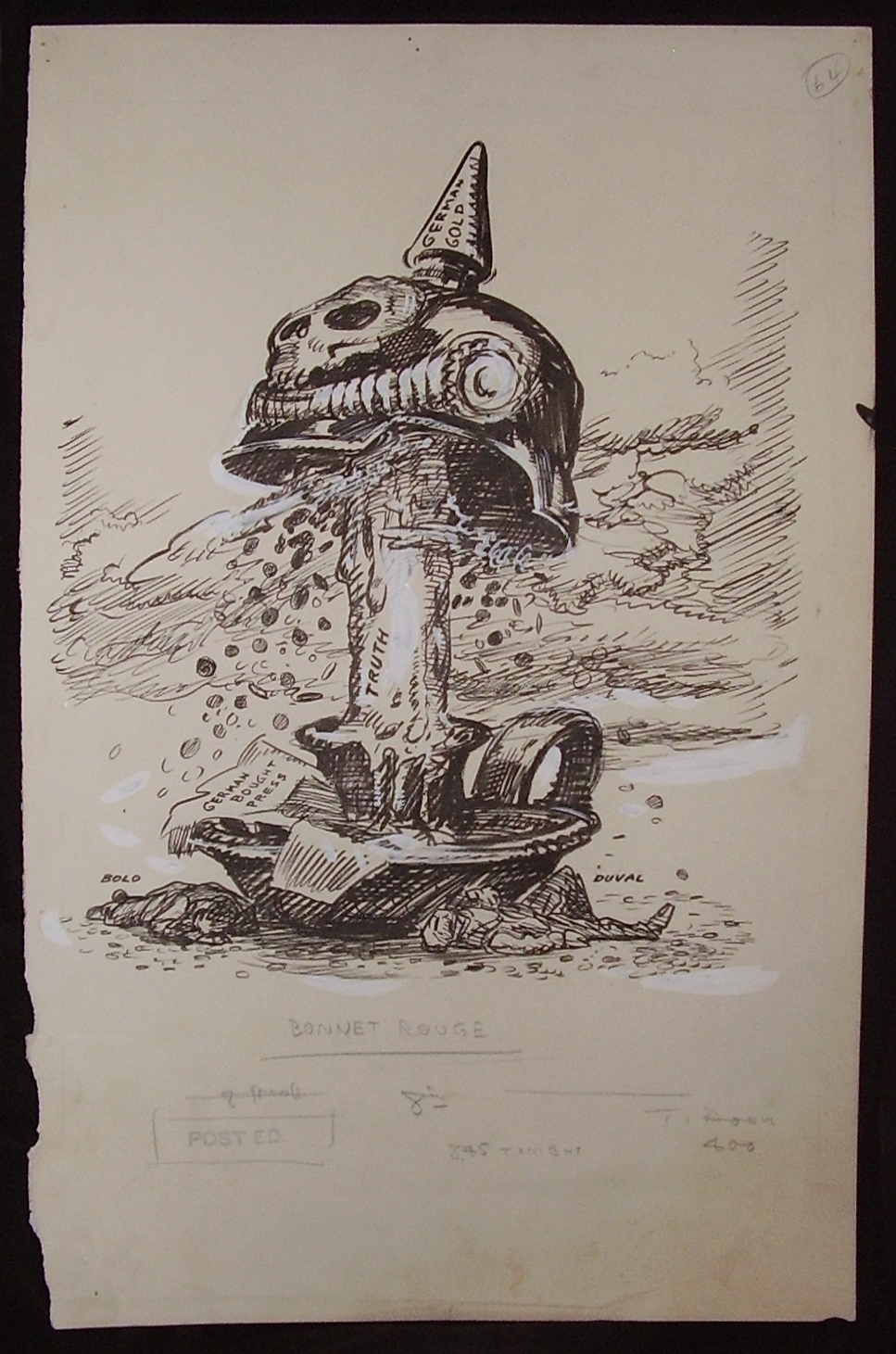
Original drawing for a WWI-era political cartoon

== Style ==
Cesare was active in opposing World War I. He adopted the grease crayon technique that had been adopted by other radical cartoonists such as Boardman Robinson, Robert Minor, K. R. Chamberlain, and Rollin Kirby.

== Personal life ==
On July 15, 1916, Cesare married Margaret Porter, the daughter of the American writer O. Henry. They divorced four years later.
