= David Morton (poet) =

American poet (1886–1957)

- Born: February 21, 1886; Elkton, Kentucky
- Died: June 13, 1957 (aged 71)
- Education: Vanderbilt University
- Occupations: Journalist, teacher, poet
- Writing career
- Genre: Poetry
- Notable awards: Golden Rose Award; National Arts Club Prize
- Football career

Vanderbilt
- Position: Fullback

David H. Morton (February 21, 1886 – June 13, 1957) was an American poet.

Born in Elkton, Kentucky, he graduated from Vanderbilt University in 1909. Morton played on the varsity football team. After a decade of newspaper work, starting at the Louisville Courier-Journal, he became a teacher in the high school at Morristown, New Jersey. Beginning in 1924, he taught at Amherst College.

His work appeared in Harper's Magazine. He is noted for having written a fan letter to Dashiell Hammett.

== Awards ==
- Golden Rose Award
- National Arts Club Prize

== Works ==
=== Poetry ===
- "The Kings Are Passing Deathward", Poetry X
- Poems: 1920-1945. A.A. Knopf. 1945.
- Poems of a Lifetime. Watermark Press. 1999. ISBN 978-1-58235-075-2.
- Ships in the Harbor. G. P. Putnam's Sons. 1921.

Nocturnes and Autumnals 1928 publisher Knickerbocker Press

=== Criticism ===
- David Morton (1929). The renaissance of Irish poetry: 1880-1930. I. Washburn.

=== Editor ===
- David Morton, ed. (1970). Shorter Modern Poems, 1900-1931. Books for Libraries Press. ISBN 978-0-8369-6152-2.
- David Morton, ed. (1929). Amherst Undergraduate Verse 1929. The Poetry Society of Amherst College.

=== Anthologies ===
- Louis Untermeyer, ed. (1921). "Symbols; Old Ships". Modern American poetry. Harcourt, Brace and company. "David Morton poet."

== Sources ==
- The Kentucky Encyclopedia
