= Ovid in the Third Reich =

Poem by Geoffrey Hill

"Ovid in the Third Reich" is a poem by the English writer Geoffrey Hill. It consists of a monologue in two quatrains and reflects on politics and innocence by transposing the ancient poet Ovid to Nazi Germany. The poem was published in the New Statesman in 1961 and opens Hill's poetry collection King Log from 1968.

One of Hill's most famous poems, "Ovid in the Third Reich" is known for its ambiguity which has led to disparate interpretations. Scholars have discussed its treatment of despair, the Third Reich, political complicity and the autonomy of poetry. Ovid's presence divides critics, who have associated his attitude in the poem with the average person during the Third Reich, or interpreted him as a contrast to ordinary people because he appears in a place where he does not belong.

== Background ==
Geoffrey Hill (1932–2016) was an English poet and scholar of English literature. He began to publish poems in 1952, at the age of 20. When he wrote "Ovid in the Third Reich" he was a lecturer at the University of Leeds.

== Structure and summary ==
Through its title, "Ovid in the Third Reich" transposes the ancient Roman poet Ovid to Nazi Germany. The poem is introduced with a Latin quotation from Ovid's Amores 3.14: "non peccat, quaecumque potest peccasse negare, / solaque famosam culpa professa facit" (transl. she who is able to deny having sinned does not sin, / only confessed guilt makes a woman scandalous).

The two quatrains that make up "Ovid in the Third Reich" are written as a monologue and reflect on politics and innocence. In the first four lines, the subject says he loves his "work and children", that God is distant, that violence is both ancient and near, and that innocence is not a weapon in the world. In the last four lines he shows sympathy for "the damned", because he has learned to appreciate a harmony between them and divine love. From his own sphere, he celebrates "the love-choir".

== Publication ==
"Ovid in the Third Reich" was first published on 17 February 1961 in the New Statesman. It was first collected with seven other Hill poems in the volume Preghiere, which was handset at the University of Leeds in 1964. In 1966, "Ovid in the Third Reich" appeared in volume eight of the series Penguin Modern Poets, which consisted of poems by Hill, Edwin Brock and Stevie Smith. "Ovid in the Third Reich" is the opening poem of Hill's 1968 collection King Log, published in the United Kingdom by André Deutsch and in the United States by Dufour Editions.

Among the collections of Hill's poems that include "Ovid in the Third Reich" are New and Collected Poems, 1952–1992, published by Houghton Mifflin in 1994, and Selected Poems, published by Penguin in 2006. It is anthologised in The Columbia Anthology of British Poetry from Columbia University Press, published in 1995. A recording of Hill reading it is included on the CD Geoffrey Hill: Poetry Reading, Oxford, 1 February 2006.

== Analysis and reception ==
"Ovid in the Third Reich" is one of Hill's most famous poems. It has led to different readings and interpretations and has been criticised for being more ambiguous than necessary. The scholar E. M. Knottenbelt says it appears both lucid and intentionally ambiguous and is among the poems by Hill that have baffled readers the most.

According to Knottenbelt, "Ovid in the Third Reich" portrays Ovid as a disillusioned man in a godless world, aware of the uselessness of appealing to a belief in God, love—in the conception of the Latin word caritas—or ignorance amid brutality. Knottenbelt says the second quatrain can be read as if Ovid has learned not to despise the damned because that judgement is reserved for God. He says it also can be read as a decision not to indulge in a self-destructive despair and instead contemplate the suffering of the damned, tying in with a Christian tradition. According to Knottenbelt, the very last lines add complexity by contrasting the exorcising of despair, which makes the subject capable as a poet, with the isolation caused by his dedication to lyrical poetry. This indicates a failure to be compassionate and may pit him against the world. Michael Wood reads the poem as a statement about the proximity between the damned and the rest of humanity, which also might be damned.

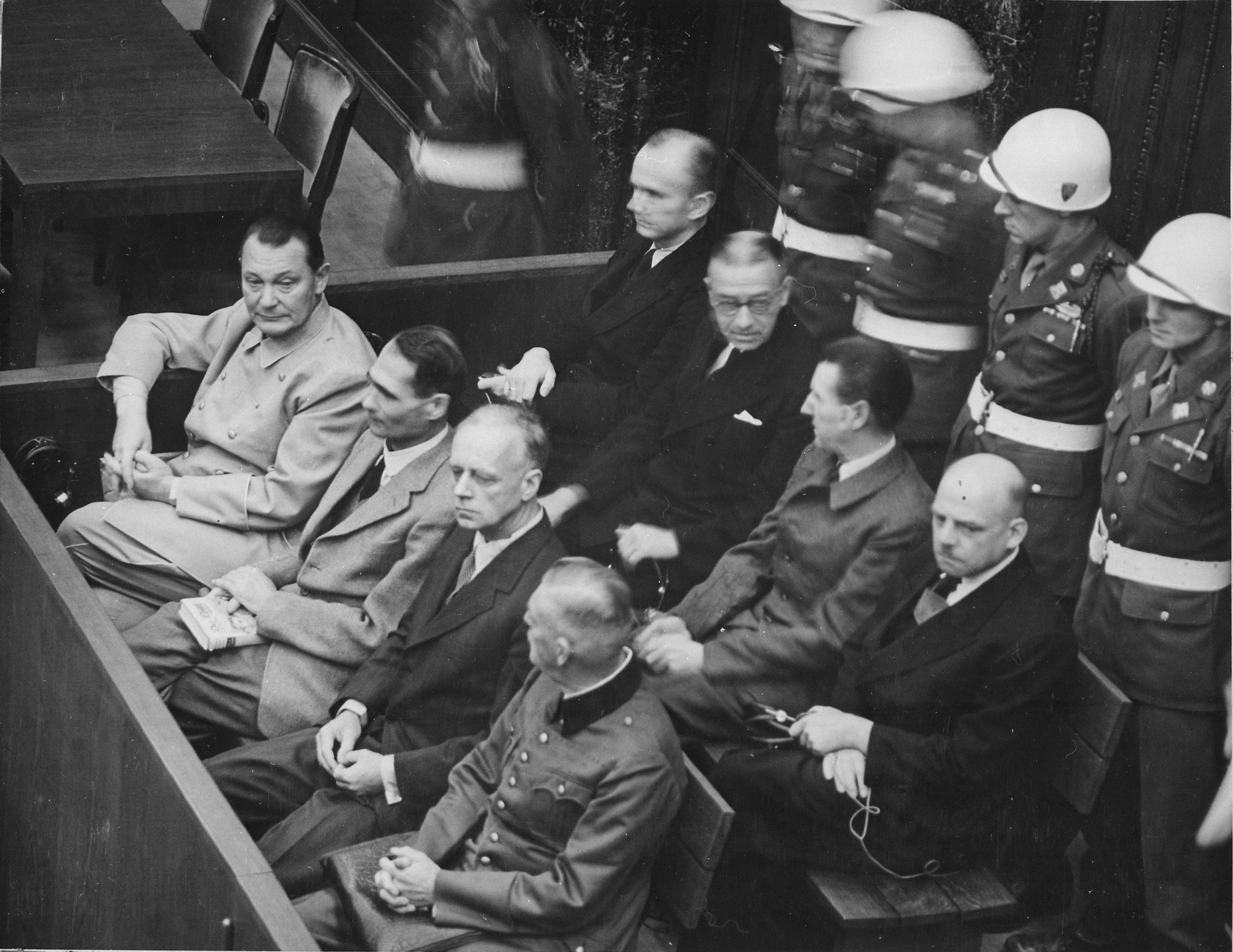
The poem's opening has been said to mimic those who distanced themselves from the Third Reich after its fall (pictured: defendants at the Nuremberg Trials).

Christopher Ricks interprets "Ovid in the Third Reich" as a poem about Germans who remained politically neutral or silent during the Nazi period, saying "what can be said for ... [and] must be said against them". David Bromwich says the opening line about work and family mimics clichés used after the fall of the Third Reich when ordinary people tried to distance themselves from the regime. He says "Ovid in the Third Reich" is about "the necessity of judging" and that a possible contrast between the first quatrain, which is more apologetic, and the second, which is more judgemental, makes it possible to interpret them as coming from two different persons. Daniella Jancsó cites Bromwich and says the poem is "unparalleled" in its disillusionment about the reveration of poets, presenting Ovid as a petty bourgeois man who talks like a politician in his attempt to escape responsibility, despite knowing he is not innocent. William Wootten associates "Ovid in the Third Reich" with a wave of literature and cinema which, inspired by the Eichmann trial of April 1961, was concerned with the average person during the Third Reich. He says it reads like "a classic reaction to Eichmann", but due to its publication in February 1961, it cannot have been inspired by the trial itself. Wootten says it may comment on—or participate in—the publicity ahead of the trial.

Knottenbelt says interpretations that emphasise ordinary people are insufficient and misleading. He says "Ovid in the Third Reich" is written as a "poet's poem" and stresses that the main character is not an average citizen but Ovid, the famous writer of elegiac love poetry, who has been placed in a setting where he does not belong: an ancient pagan in the Christian Nazi Germany. Knottenbelt says Ovid's life during the "totalitarian" Roman Empire adds more uncertainty to the poem; Ovid was banished from Rome late in his life, but the epigraph is from Amores, one of his early works. Knottenbelt places significance on the fact that Hill chose "Ovid in the Third Reich" as the opening poem of King Log, a collection concerned with the autonomy of poetry. He interprets it as an examination of Hill's earnest conviction of poetry's autonomy, and his fears about the moral evasiveness this may amount to.

The scholar Lennart Nyberg uses "Ovid in the Third Reich" to exemplify Hill's poetic technique where otherwise insignificant phrases become language acts: this happens when the poem uses the words "things happen" to imply atrocities and guilt. Theodore Ziolkowski interpreted the poem by describing Hill as "a full-fledged member of the skeptical generation". Hill's goal, according to Ziolkowski, was to separate poetry from politics by participating in a perennial battle between, on one side, beauty and order, and, on the other, temporal history and power. Hill here defended a fragile innocence. Ziolkowski said the sceptical stance of the poet in "Ovid in the Third Reich", who celebrates love and innocence, is simultaneously presented as a form of political complicity.

== See also ==
- God Was Born in Exile
- An Imaginary Life
- The Last World
