= Oscar Williams (poet) =

American anthologist and poet (1900–1964)

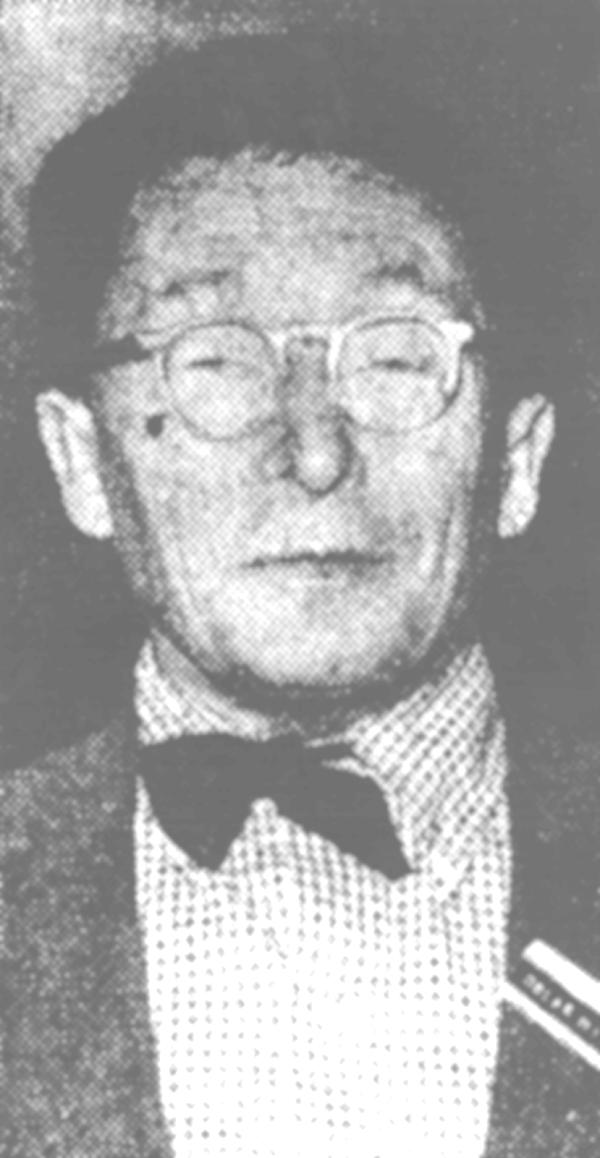
- Born: Oscar Kaplan; December 29, 1900; Letychiv, Ukraine
- Died: October 10, 1964 (aged 63)
- Occupations: Anthologist; poet
- Spouse: Gene Derwood
- Children: 1
- Parent(s): Mouzya Kaplan; Chana Rapoport
- Writing career
- Pen name: Oscar Williams

Oscar Kaplan (December 29, 1900 – October 10, 1964), known by his pen name Oscar Williams, was an American anthologist and poet.

== Biography ==
Williams was born Oscar Kaplan in Letychiv, Ukraine, son of Jewish parents Mouzya Kaplan and Chana Rapoport. He emigrated to New York at the age of seven.

His first book, Golden Darkness, was awarded the Yale Younger Poets Prize.

Among his influential anthologies are Master Poems of the English Language, Immortal Poems of the English Language, The Pocket Book of Modern Verse, and the Little Treasury Poetry Series, which were used in colleges and high schools around the U.S. in the 1950s and 1960s. During his lifetime, anthologies he edited sold more than two million copies, a nearly unheard amount for books of poetry. Many of his anthologies are still being republished today. Though a friend and promoter of poets like Dylan Thomas and George Barker, Williams' own poetry is not highly regarded by critics, though he published several volumes during his lifetime, and is not nearly as accomplished as the poetry of his wife, Gene Derwood (1909–1954). Geoffrey Hill often carried with him Oscar Williams' A Little Treasury of Modern Poetry (1946), and Hill speculates that "there was probably a time when I knew every poem in that anthology by heart."

Among Williams' poems are "Revenge", "Poem", "Poet", "The Last Supper", "I Sing an Old Song", and "The City's Face".

"Shopping for Meat in Winter" is a typical Williams poem, with its urban theme, forced rhyme, and attempts at replicating the neo-Romanticism of the New Apocalypse.

Shopping for Meat in Winter
What lewd, naked and revolting shape is this?
A frozen oxtail in the butcher's shop
Long and lifeless upon the huge block of wood
On which the ogre's axe begins chop chop.
The sun like incense fumes on the smoky glass,
The street frets with people, the winter wind
Throws knives, prices dangle from shoppers' mouths
While the grim vegetables, on parade, bring to mind
The great countryside bathed in golden sleep,
The trees, the bees, the soft peace everywhere –
I think of the cow's tail, how all summer long
It beat the shapes of harps into the air.

Oscar Williams and his poet-artist wife Gene Derwood sponsored an annual $15,000 poetry award which bears their name. They lived in a penthouse of an office building at 35 Water Street, Lower Manhattan. In his later years, Oscar Williams' home near Wall Street in Manhattan served as a mecca for young poets. Asked how he chose the poems used in his anthologies, he said, "How do you pick one girl to marry? In poetry it's divine polygamy. Generally, when a poem stays with me a long time that poem delivers the goods."

Throughout his life, Oscar Williams eschewed his Jewish background. He was always mysterious about his origins and was buried by an Episcopal Church. He was survived by a son, Strephon Kaplan-Williams, who was raised in boarding schools and hardly ever interacted with his parents. His papers are housed at the Indiana University Lilly Library.

== Published works ==
- Williams, Oscar (1921). The Golden Darkness. Yale University Press.
- Hibernalia, Lantern, 1938.
- The Man Coming toward You: A Book of Poems, Oxford University Press, 1940.
- War Poets, ISBN 0-89609-058-2, Roth, 1945.
- That's All That Matters, Creative Age Press, 1945.
- A Little Treasury of Modern Poetry: English & American, Charles Scribner, 1946., Routledge and Kegan Paul, London, 1947.
- A little Treasury of Great Poetry English & American from Chaucer To the Present Day, Charles Scribner, 1947.
- Gypsy Blue : First Draft, 1950.
- The Golden Treasury of Best Songs and Lyrical Poems, Mentor, 1953.
- The Pocket Book of Modern Verse, Washington Square Press, 1954.
- The New Pocket Anthology of American Verse, Pocket Library, 1955.
- The Golden Treasury of the Best Songs and Lyrical Poems, Mentor, 1961.
- The Mentor book of Major American poets,: From Edward Taylor and Walt Whitman to Hart Crane and W.H. Auden, Mentor, 1962.
- The Mentor Book of Major British Poets: From William Blake to Dylan Thomas, Mentor, 1963.
- Oscar Williams: Selected Poems, ISBN 0-8079-0136-9, October House, 1964.
- Williams, Oscar (1969). Immortal Poems of the English Language. Washington Square Press. ISBN 978-0-671-49610-4. (reprint 1983)
- The Major Metaphysical Poets of the 17th Century, Washington Square Press, 1969.
- The New Pocket Anthology of American Verse from Colonial Days to the Present, Washington Square Press, 1972.
- A Little Treasury of American Poetry: The Chief Poets from Colonial Times to the Present Day, ISBN 0-684-10666-3, Macmillan, 1975.
- A Silver Treasury of Verse, ISBN 0-451-60201-3, Signet, date unknown.
