= Harold Trowbridge Pulsifer =

American poet (1886–1948)

Harold Trowbridge Pulsifer (November 18, 1886 in Manchester, Connecticut – 1948 in Sarasota, Florida) was an American poet and magazine editor.

== Life ==
He graduated from Harvard University in 1911. He lived in Mountainville, New York. He edited The Outlook (New York) magazine, from 1913 to 1928, and was a friend of Theodore Roosevelt.

His collection of Winslow Homer paintings, are held at Colby College Maine.

His work appeared in The New Yorker.

He retired to Harpswell, Maine.

== Awards ==
- Golden Rose Award
- 1938 Finalist for Pulitzer Prize

== Works ==
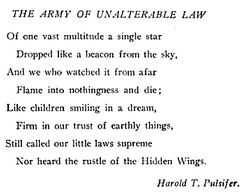
Poem published in volume 48 of The Harvard Monthly, 1909, written by Harold Trowbridge Pulsifer

=== Poetry ===
- "Faces". Anthology of Magazine Verse for 1920.
- Bernard M. Sheridan, ed. (1918). "To a Schoolmate -- Killed in Action". The Liberty Reader. B.H. Sanborn & Co. p. 118. "Harold Trowbridge Pulsifer."
- "Desecration". Forestry & irrigation. American Forestry Association. 1908.
- Alfred Emanuel Smith, ed. (1922). "The Duel". New Outlook. Outlook Publishing Company, Inc.
- Mothers and men: a book of poems. Houghton Mifflin Company. 1916. "Harold Trowbridge Pulsifer."
- Harvest of Time: Poems. Houghton Mifflin company. 1932.
- Elegy for a House. Bradford Press. 1935.
- First symphony: a sonnet sequence. Houghton Mifflin. 1935.
- Rowen: A Collection of Verse. Houghton Mifflin company. 1937.
- Poems, 1912-1947. Colby College Press. 1954.

=== Fiction ===
- Glory o' the Dawn. Houghton Mifflin Company. 1923.

=== Anthologies ===
- Amy Bonner, ed. (1946). "Of Little Faith". The Poetry Society of America anthology. Ayer Publishing. ISBN 978-0-8369-6003-7.
