= Kenneth Porter (poet) =

American poet and historian (1905–1981)

- Born: Kenneth Wiggins Porter; February 17, 1905
- Died: July 9, 1981 (aged 76)
- Occupations: Poet, historian
- Spouse: Annette MacDonald (m. 1946)
- Writing career
- Notable awards: Golden Rose Award

Kenneth Wiggins Porter (February 17, 1905 – July 9, 1981) was an American poet and historian.

== Education ==
He graduated from Harvard University in history and business history.

== Career ==
He taught at Southwestern College, and Vassar College. He worked for the National Archives from 1941 to 1943, and from 1948 to 1955, for the Business History Foundation.

In 1954, he was a Fulbright lecturer at Melbourne University. From 1955 to 1958, he taught at the University of Illinois, and at the University of Oregon, from 1958 to 1972.

His papers are held at the New York Public Library.

== Personal life ==
He married Annette MacDonald in 1946.

== Awards ==
- Golden Rose Award

== Works ==
=== Poetry ===
- Diane Dufva Quantic; P. Jane Hafen, eds. (2003). "Land of the Crippled Snake". A Great Plains reader. University of Nebraska Press. ISBN 978-0-8032-3802-2.
- The High Plains. John Day. 1938.
- No Rain from These Clouds. John Day. 1946.
- Kenneth Wiggins Porter: The Kansas Poems. Washburn University. 1982.

=== Criticism ===
- "Roethke at Harvard 1930–31, and the decade after". Northwest Review. XI. Summer 1971.

=== History ===
- Provincial Assemblies on the Eve of the French Revolution. University of Minnesota. 1927.
- John Jacob Astor and the Sandalwood Trade of the Hawaiian Islands, 1816–1828. Harvard University Press. 1930.
- Jacob Astor, Businessman. Harvard University Press. 1931.
- Jacksons and the Lees: Two Generations of Massachusetts Merchants 1765–1844. Russell & Russell. 1969. ISBN 978-0-8462-1244-7. (Harvard University Press, 1937).
- The History of Humble Oil and Refining Company, with Henrietta M. Larson (Harper and Row, 1959)
- Negro Labor in the Western Cattle Industry, 1866–1900. Bobbs-Merrill. 1969.
- The Negro on the American Frontier. Arno Press. 1971. ISBN 978-0-405-01983-8.
- Porter, Kenneth Wiggins; Amos, Alcione M.; Senter, Thomas P. (1996). The Black Seminoles: History of a Freedom-Seeking People. University Press of Florida. ISBN 978-0-8130-1451-7.
