= Charles Edward Eaton =

American poet

- Born: June 25, 1916; Winston-Salem, North Carolina, U.S.
- Died: March 25, 2006 (aged 89)
- Occupation: Poet

Academic background
- Education: Harvard University; Princeton University

Charles Edward Eaton (June 25, 1916 – March 23, 2006) was an American poet and professor.

== Life ==
He was born in Winston-Salem, N.C. Eaton received his B.A. degree from the University of North Carolina in 1936, studied at Princeton, and received his M.A. degree from Harvard, where he worked with Robert Frost, who later recommended him to the Bread Loaf Writers' Conference.

Eaton served as Vice Consul in Brazil, 1942–1946, and as professor of creative writing at UNC, 1946–1952. In 1950, he married Isabel Patterson of Pittsburgh.

His papers are at the University of North Carolina.

== Awards ==
- Golden Rose Award
- 1981 Arvon Foundation competition winner

== Works ==
=== Poetry ===
- The shadow of the swimmer. Fine Editions Press. 1951.
- Countermoves. Abelard-Schuman. 1962.
- On the edge of the knife. Abelard-Schuman. 1970.
- The man in the green chair. A. S. Barnes. 1977. ISBN 978-0-498-02040-7.
- Colophon of the rover: poems. A. S. Barnes. 1980. ISBN 978-0-498-02324-8.
- The thing king. Associated University Presses. 1982. ISBN 978-0-8453-4743-0.
- The work of the wrench. Associated University Presses. 1985. ISBN 978-0-8453-4794-2.
- New and Selected Poems, 1942-1987. Associated University Presses. 1987. ISBN 978-0-8453-4807-9.
- A guest on mild evenings. Associated University Presses. 1991. ISBN 978-0-8453-4831-4.
- A lady of pleasure. Associated University Presses. 1993. ISBN 978-0-8453-4847-5.
- The country of the blue. Associated University Presses. 1994. ISBN 978-0-8453-4850-5.
- The fox and I. Associated University Presses. 1996. ISBN 978-0-8453-4861-1.
- The Scout in Summer. Associated University Presses. 1999. ISBN 978-0-8453-4866-6.
- The Jogger by the Sea. Associated University Presses. 2000. ISBN 978-0-8453-4872-7.
- Between the Devil and the Deep Blue Sea. Associated University Presses. 2002. ISBN 978-0-8453-4883-3.
- The Labyrinth. Associated University Presses. 2004. ISBN 978-0-8453-4888-8.
- The work of the sun: new and selected poems, 1991-2002. Associated University Presses. 2004. ISBN 978-0-8453-4887-1.

=== Stories ===
- New and Selected Stories, 1959-1989. Associated University Presses. 1989. ISBN 978-0-8453-4821-5.

=== Non-Fiction ===
- The man from Buena Vista: selected nonfiction, 1944-2000. Associated University Presses. 2001. ISBN 978-0-8453-4878-9.
