= Theodore Spencer =

20th-century American poet and academic

Theodore Spencer (1902–1949) was an American poet and academic.

== Life ==
He graduated from Princeton University in 1923, and a Ph.D from Harvard University in 1928. He then taught there, from 1927 to 1949. He was appointed lecturer in English literature at Cambridge University, England, in 1939. In 1942, Spencer gave the Lowell lectures on Shakespeare, published as Shakespeare and the Nature of Man, his most important work. From 1946 to 1949, he was the Boylston Professor of Rhetoric and Oratory at Harvard.

Spencer also published essays, short stories, and poetry.

Spencer died of a heart attack in a taxi. His notebook is at Princeton University, and papers are at Harvard University.

== Awards ==
- Golden Rose Award

== Works ==
=== Poetry ===
- The paradox in the circle. New Directions. 1941.
- An act of life. Harvard University Press. 1944.
- An acre in the seed: Poems. Harvard University Press. 1949.
- Poems, 1940-1947. Harvard University Press. 1948.

=== Essays ===
- Shakespeare and the nature of man. Macmillan. 1951.
- A garland for John Donne, 1631-1931. P. Smith. 1958.
- Donald Watt, ed. (1975). "Aldous Huxley review". Aldous Huxley, the critical heritage. Routledge & K. Paul. ISBN 978-0-7100-8114-8.
