= Dunstan Thompson =

American poet

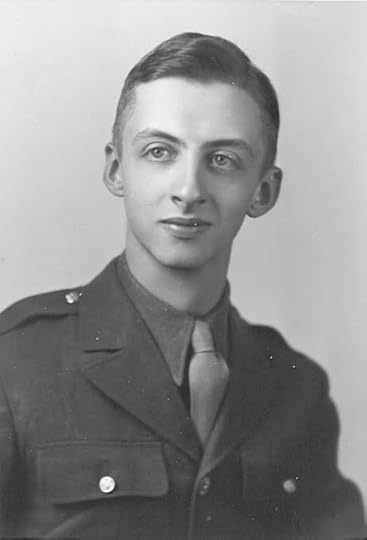
- Born: 1918; New London, Connecticut, United States
- Died: 1975 (aged 56–57)
- Allegiance: United States
- Service years: 1942
- Education: Harvard University

Dunstan Thompson (1918–1975) was an American poet who lived in Britain. A Catholic, he wrote openly about gay and wartime experiences.

== Life and career ==
Thompson was born in New London, Connecticut, and educated at Harvard University. He edited a magazine, Vice Versa. in New York City between 1940 and 1942, with Harry Brown.

Thompson joined the U.S. Army in 1942; his Poems (Simon & Schuster) was published in 1943. Borges translated some of his poems into Spanish shortly after. Also in 1942 he published a novel, The Dove with the Bough of Olive. After the war he traveled in the Middle East and settled in the United Kingdom. In 1947, he published Lament for the Sleepwalker, another book of poetry. A travel book, The Phoenix in the Desert, appeared in 1951.

Subsequently, he published little and virtually disappeared from literary circles; a few poems were taken by magazines. Poems 1950-1974 (1984, Paradigm Press) was a posthumous collection.

Raised Catholic, he returned to Catholicism, which led his partner Philip Trower to convert, starting in 1952. After this a priest gave the couple permission to continue living together but as celibates. This arrangement, celibacy but living with a male partner in the 1950s, has been remarked upon by both gay and Catholic critics of his work.

== Works ==
- Poems (1943)
- "Lament for the Sleepwalkers" (1946)
- "Phoenix in the Desert" (1951) Travelogue
- "The Dove with the Bough of Olives" (1954) Novel
