= Ruth E. Fine =

American artist (born 1941)

- Born: 1941 (age 84–85); Philadelphia, Pennsylvania, US
- Education: Skowhegan School of Painting and Sculpture 1961; Philadelphia College of Art, BFA 1962; University of Pennsylvania, MFA 1964
- Occupations: Curator and teacher
- Employer: National Gallery of Art

Ruth E. Fine (born 1941) is an American painter, printmaker, museum curator, college instructor, and art historian. She was a curator at the National Gallery of Art from 1972 to 2012. She is currently the chair of the Roy Lichtenstein Foundation.

== Early life ==
Fine was born in Philadelphia, Pennsylvania in 1941. Her mother was Miriam Brown Fine, who graduated from the Philadelphia College of Art in 1935. In 1961, she was a student at the Skowhegan School of Painting and Sculpture. She attended the Philadelphia College of Art, earning a BFA in 1962. She then received a MFA from the University of Pennsylvania in 1964.

== Career ==
Fine taught design, drawing, and printmaking at the Philadelphia College of Art from 1965 to 1969, at Beaver College from 1968 to 1972, the University of Vermont from 1976 to 1972, and again at Beaver College from 1978 to 1979.

Fine became a curator with the National Gallery of Art in 1972, first working with the Lessing J, Rosenwald Collection based in Jenkintown, Pennsylvania from 1972 to 1980 before it moved to the National Gallery in Washington, D.C. in 1979 She was the curator of modern prints and drawings from 1980 to 2002, and the curator of special projects in modern art from 2002 to 2012. While with the National Gallery of Art, she organized exhibitions on Romare Bearden, Helen Frankenthaler, Jasper Johns, Norman Lewis, Roy Lichtenstein, John Marin, and Georgia O'Keeffe. As a museum curator and art historian, she oversaw catalogue raisonnés, made presentations, and wrote many essays, articles, and publications. She retired from the National Gallery in 2012, and became the chair of the Roy Lichtenstein Foundation.

Fine is a painter and printmaker and illustrated five books. In 1989, she received a grant from the Ingram Merrill Foundation to work on her etchings. She had studio residences at the Vermont Studio Center in 1992 and the Anni and Josef Albers Foundation in 2000. Fine has had exhibitiions at the Anna Leonowens Gallery of NSCAD University, Beaver College, Bennington College, Bryn Mawr College, the Philadelphia Art Alliance, Ryder University, and the Von Hess Works on Paper Gallery.

Fine's artwork is in the collections of the Boston Public Library, Bryn Mawr College, Columbia University, Dartmouth Collge, The Hague, IBM Corporation, the Museum of the Book, the National Gallery of Art, the National Library of Canada, the Pennsylvania Academy of the Fine Arts, and the Victoria and Albert Museum Library. Her papers are housed at the Smithsonian Institution as part of the Archives of American Art.

== Selected publications ==
- Fine, Ruth E. Lessing J. Rosenwald: Tribute to a Collector. Washington, D.C. National Gallery of Art, 1982. ISBN 0-89468-004-8.
- Fine, Ruth. Drawing near: Whistler etchings from the Zelman Collection. Los Angeles: Los Angeles County Museum of Art, 1984. ISBN 9780875871196.
- Spruance, Benton and Looney, Robert F. and Fine, Ruth. The Prints of Benton Murdoch Spruance: A Catalogue Raisonne. Philadelphia: University of Pennsylvania Press, 1986. ISBN 9780812280043.
- Fine, Ruth E. John Marin. Washington, D.C.: National Gallery of Art, 1990. ISBN 9781558590151.
- Fine, Ruth Fine and Cuno, James B. and Borofsky Jonathan et al. Subjects: Prints and Multiples by Jonathan Borofsky (1982-1991). Hanover: Hood Museum of Art, 1992. ISBN 9780944722121.
- Fine, Ruth. The Janus Press 1981-1990 : Catalogue Raisonné. Burlington, Vermont: University of Vermont Libraries, 1992.
- Fine, Ruth. "Introduction" in Gemini G.E.L.: Recent Prints and Sculpture by Charles Ritchie. Washington, D.C.: National Gallery of Art, 1994. pp. 11–13. ISBN 978-0894681233
- Fine, Ruth. Summer Day | Winter Night: Linocuts by Ruth Fine (Books On Books Collection). Newark: Janus Press, 1994.
- Rosenquist, James and Fine, Ruth and Hopps, Walter. James Rosenquist: A Retrospective. Guggenheim Museum, 2003. ISBN 9780892072675.
- Fine, Ruth. The John Marin Collection of the Colby College Museum of Art. Waterville, Maine: Colby College Museum of Art, 2003. ISBN 9780972848404
- Fine, Ruth. Drawing on America's Past: Folk Art, Modernism, and the Index of Modern Design. Chapel Hill: University of North Carolina Press, 2003. ISBN 9780875871196.
- Fine, Ruth. The Janus Press, Fifty Years : Catalogue Raisonné for 1991-2005, Indexes for 1955-2005. Burlington, Vermont: University of Vermont Libraries, 2006.
- Fine, Ruth. Magical Means: Milton Avery and Watercolor. New York: Knoedler & Company, 2007. ISBN 9780978998738.
- Willis, Deborah and Fine, Ruth and Childs, Adrienne L. Evolution: Five Decades of Printmaking by David C. Driskell. Petaluma, California: Pomegranate Communications, Inc., 2007. ISBN 9780764942044
- Berman, Avis and Fine, Ruth and Ramírez, Juan Antonio. Roy Lichtenstein: Beginning to End. Madrid: Fundación Juan March, 2007. ISBN 978-8470755422.
- Fine, Ruth Fine and Langdale, Shelley L. Full Spectrum: Prints from the Brandywine Workshop. Philadelphia: Philadelphia Museum of Art, 2012. ISBN 9780300185485.
- Fine, Ruth. William Daley: Ceramic Artist. Atglen, Pennsylvania: Schiffer Publishing, 2013. ISBN 9780764345234.
- Fine, Ruth. Reescrituras Bíblicas Cervantinas (Spanish Edition). Madrid: Iberoamericana Editorial Vervuert, 2014. ISBN 9788484898023,
- Fine, Ruth, editor. Procession: The Art of Norman Lewis. Berkeley: University of California Press, 2015. ISBN 9780520288003.
- Fine, Ruth and Pascale, Mark. Martin Puryear: Multiple Dimensions. Chicago: Art Institute of Chicago, 2015. ISBN 9780300184549.
- Fine, Ruth. Michael Heizer: Altars. New York: Gagosian / Rizzoli, 2016. ISBN 9780847847679.
- Fine, Ruth. "The Written Sea, 1952" in American Paintings, 1900–1945. Washington, D.C. National Gallery of Art. Published online September 29, 2016.
- Fine, Ruth and Moten, Fred et al. Frank Stewart's Nexus: An American Photographer’s Journey, 1960’s to the Present. New York: Rizzoli Electa, 2023. ISBN 978-0-8478-9935-7.
