= Gene Derwood =

American poet and painter

Gene Derwood (1909–1954) was an American poet, painter and wife of the poet and anthologist Oscar Williams.

== Life ==
The couple lived in a penthouse of an office building at 35 Water Street, Lower Manhattan.

The Lilly Library of Indiana University holds a collection of her letters. Harvard University also holds archival material.

== Works ==
- "After reading St. John the Divine", Nox Oculi; set to music by composer Marjorie Rusche
- "Elegy on Gordon Barber" (poem), L'Ecritoire, August 27, 2005
- The Poems of Gene Derwood, Clarke and Way, 1955.
