= 1999 in poetry =

Nationality words link to articles with information on the nation's poetry or literature (for instance, Irish or France).

== Events ==
- May 1 — Andrew Motion becomes Poet Laureate of the United Kingdom for 10 years
- July 1 — The new Scottish Parliament opens with the singing of Robert Burns' "A Man's a Man for A' That", instead of "God Save the Queen"
- October 4 — In the United States, New Jersey Governor Christine Todd Whitman signs into law Assembly Bill No. 2714 (P.L. 1999, c. 228) sent to her from the state legislature and creates the New Jersey William Carlos Williams Citation of Merit—effectively, Poet Laureate of New Jersey. Whitman subsequently selects poet Gerald Stern (b. 1925), then a resident of Lambertville, New Jersey, as the first appointed to the post in the following April
- The Robert Fitzgerald Prosody Award is established at the Fifth Annual West Chester University Poetry Conference. The award is given to scholars who have made a lasting contribution to the art and science of versification. Derek Attridge is the first winner
- Carl Rakosi's 99th birthday celebrated at the Kelly Writers House with a live audiocast
- A new grave slab is installed at the Greyfriars Kirkyard in Edinburgh over the final resting place of William Topaz McGonagall (1825–1904), comically renowned as the worst poet in the English language; the slab is inscribed:

William McGonagall
Poet and Tragedian

"I am your gracious Majesty
ever faithful to Thee,
William McGonagall, the Poor Poet,
That lives in Dundee."

== Works published in English ==
Listed by nation where the work was first published and again by the poet's native land, if different; substantially revised works listed separately:

=== Australia ===
- Robert Adamson, Black Water: Approaching Zukofsky
- Jennifer Maiden, Mines, Paper Bark, ISBN 90-5704-046-8
- Les Murray:
  - Fredy Neptune, verse novel, winner of the 2005 Premio Mondello (in Italy)
  - New Selected Poems, Duffy & Snellgrove
  - Conscious and Verbal, Carcanet, Duffy & Snellgrove

=== Canada ===
- Ken Babstock, Mean, his first book of poetry, winner of the Atlantic Poetry Prize and the Milton Acorn People's Poet Award (Canada)
- Afua Cooper, editor, Utterances and Incantations: Women, Poetry and Dub, Toronto: Sister Vision Press (scholarship)
- Jeffery Donaldson, Waterglass, McGill-Queen's University Press
- George Elliott Clarke, Gold Indigoes. Durham: Carolina Wren, ISBN 0-932112-40-4
- Susan Holbrook, misled
- Tim Lilburn, To the River, winner of the Saskatchewan Book Award for Book of the Year
- A. F. Moritz, Rest on the Flight into Egypt
- Andy Quan and Jim Wong-Chu, editors, Swallowing Clouds: An Anthology of Chinese-Canadian Poetry, Vancouver, British Columbia: Arsenal Pulp Press

=== India, in English ===
- Rukmini Bhaya Nair, The Ayodhya Cantos ( Poetry in English ), New Delhi: Penguin
- C. P. Surendran, Posthumous Poems ( Poetry in English ), New Delhi: Penguin (Viking); not posthumously published
- Sudeep Sen:
  - Bodytext: Dramatic Monologues in Motion, London Borough of Harrow: Harrow Arts and Leisure Service
  - Retracing American Contours, Columbia: University of South Carolina
- Eunice de Souza, editor, Talking Poems: Conversations with Poets, New Delhi: Oxford University Press, ISBN 0-19-564782-3
- E.V. Ramakrishnan, editor, The Tree of Tongues: An Anthology of Modern Indian Poetry, Arundhathi Subramaniam called the volume "a landmark book of translations of modern Indian poetry"; Shimla: Indian Institute of Advanced Study, ISBN 81-85952-70-1

=== Ireland ===
- Ciaran Carson, The Ballad of HMS Belfast, Oldcastle: The Gallery Press, ISBN 978-1-85235-246-2
- Vona Groarke, Other People's Houses, Oldcastle: The Gallery Press,
- Joan McBreen, editor, The White Page an bhileog bh'an: Twentieth-Century Irish Women Poets Cliffs of Moher, County Clare: Salmon
- Thomas McCarthy, Mr Dineen's Careful Parade: New and Selected Poems, Anvil Press, London, Irish poet published in the United Kingdom
- Medbh McGuckian and Eiléan Ní Chuilleanáin, translators, The Water Horse: Poems in Irish Nuala Ní Dhomhnaill, Oldcastle: The Gallery Press

=== New Zealand ===
- Alistair Campbell, Gallipoli & Other Poems, Wellington: Wai-te-ata Press
- Janet Charman, Rapunzel Rapunzel, Auckland: Auckland University Press
- Leigh Davis, Te Tangi a te Matuhi, Auckland: Jack Books
- Michele Leggott, As far as I can see, Auckland: Auckland University Press
- Robin Hyde, The book of Nadath, introduction and notes by Michele Leggott; Auckland: Auckland University Press, posthumous
- Bill Manhire, What to Call Your Child
- Sarah Quigley, Raewyn Alexander and Anna Jackson, AUP New Poets 1: Sarah Quigley, Raewyn Alexander and Anna Jackson, Auckland: Auckland University Press

=== United Kingdom ===
- Mark Bryant, editor, Literary Hymns: An Anthology, London: Hodder & Stoughton
- Gerry Cambridge, Nothing But Heather!, Luath Press ISBN 0-946487-49-9
- Julia Donaldson. The Gruffalo, children's story in verse
- Carol Ann Duffy:
  - Meeting Midnight, Faber and Faber (children's poetry)
  - The World's Wife, Anvil Press Poetry
- Seamus Heaney:
  - The Light of the Leaves, Bonnefant Press
  - Translator: Beowulf, Faber & Faber
  - Translator: Diary of One Who Vanished, a song cycle by Leoš Janáček of poems by Ozef Kalda, Faber & Faber
- John Heath-Stubbs, The Sound of Light
- Ted Hughes, translator:
  - Aeschylus: The Oresteia
  - Alcestis
- Kathleen Jamie, Jizzen
- Andrew Johnston, The Open Window, Arc Publications, New Zealand poet living in Paris, France
- Anne MacLeod, Just the Caravaggio, Scottish poet
- Derek Mahon, Collected Poems, Gallery Press
- Don Paterson, The Eyes
- Tom Paulin, The Wind Dog
- Peter Reading, Apophthegmatic
- Peter Redgrove, Selected Poems
- Mary Jo Salter, A Kiss in Space, Knopf
- Marina Tsvetayeva, The Selected Poems of Marina Tsvetayeva, translated by Elaine Feinstein, fifth edition, with new poems and a new introduction, Oxford University Press/Carcanet
- Hugo Williams, Billy's Rain, Faber and Faber

==== Anthologies in the United Kingdom ====
- Richard Caddel and Peter Quartermain, editors, Other: British and Irish Poetry since 1970, an anthology of poetry outside The Movement (essentially the mainstream) of English and Irish poetry (Wesleyan University Press)
- Carol Ann Duffy, editor, Time's Tidings: Greeting the 21st Century, Anvil Press Poetry
- Elaine Feinstein, editor, After Pushkin, "versions by contemporary poets", published by the Folio Society and Carcanet
- Iona Opie, editor, Here Comes Mother Goose, a collection of nursery rhymes
- Michael Schmidt, The Harvill Book of Twentieth-Century Poetry in English
- Adam Schwartzman, editor, Ten South African poets, Manchester: Carcanet

=== United States ===
- John Ashbery, Girls on the Run, a book-length poem inspired by the work of artist Henry Darger
- Joseph Brodsky: Discovery, New York: Farrar, Straus & Giroux Russian-American
- Jared Carter, Les Barricades Mysterieuses, Cleveland State University Poetry Center.
- Robert Dassanowsky, Telegrams from the Metropole. Selected Poems 1980-1998 ISBN 978-3-901993-02-2
- Rita Dove, On the Bus with Rosa Parks (Norton); a New York Times "notable book of the year"
- Beth Gylys, Bodies that Hum (Silverfish Review Press); winner of the Gerald Cable Book Award
- Geoffrey Hill, The Triumph of Love (Houghton Mifflin); a New York Times "notable book of the year"
- John Hollander, Figurehead and Other Poems
- Fanny Howe, Forged
- William Logan, Night Battle
- Glyn Maxwell, The Breakage, (Houghton Mifflin); a New York Times "notable book of the year"
- W. S. Merwin, The River Sound: Poems, New York: Knopf; a New York Times "notable book of the year"
- Eugenio Montale, Collected Poems: 1920-1954 (Farrar, Straus & Giroux); a New York Times "notable book of the year"; translated from Italian
- Mary Oliver, Winter Hours: Prose, Prose Poems, and Poems
- Michael Palmer, The Danish Notebook (Avec Books); memoir/poetic essay. ISBN 9781880713181
- George Quasha (with Chie Hasegawa), Ainu Dreams (Station Hill Press)
- Carl Rakosi, The Old Poet's Tale
- Kenneth Rexroth, Swords That Shall Not Strike: Poems of Protest and Rebellion (Glad Day; posthumous)
- Charles Simic, Jackstraws: Poems (Harcourt Brace); a New York Times "notable book of the year"
- A. E. Stallings, Archaic Smile
- Mark Strand, Chicken, Shadow, Moon & More, by a Canadian native long living in and published in the United States
- Eleanor Ross Taylor, Late Leisure
- Melvin B. Tolson, Harlem Gallery: And Other Poems (University Press of Virginia); a New York Times "notable book of the year"
- Rosmarie Waldrop, Reluctant Gravities (New Directions)
- Jesse Lee Kercheval, World as Dictionary

==== Criticism, scholarship and biography in the United States ====
- M. H. Abrams, A Glossary of Literary Terms (first published in 1958), goes into its seventh edition, Fort Worth, Texas: Harcourt Brace
- Charles Bernstein, A Poetics (Cambridge: Harvard University Press)
- Molly Peacock, How to Read a Poem ... and Start a Poetry Circle, New York: Riverhead Books

==== Anthologies in the United States ====
- Riohard Caddel and Peter Quartermain, editors, Other: British and Irish Poetry since 1970 Wesleyan University Press
- Ed Dorn and Gordon Brotherston, editors (and Brotherston, translator), Sun Unwound: Original Texts from Occupied America, North Atlantic Books anthology
- Tanure Ojaide and Tijan M. Sallah, editors, The New African Poetry: An Anthology, Boulder, Colorado: Lynne Reinner Publishers
- A. L. Soens, editor, I, the Song : Classical Poetry of Native North America, Salt Lake City: University of Utah Press

===== Poets in The Best American Poetry 1999 =====
Poems from these 75 poets are in The Best American Poetry 1999, edited by David Lehman, guest editor, Robert Bly:

- Dick Allen
- John Balaban
- Coleman Barks
- George Bilgere
- Elizabeth Bishop
- Chana Bloch
- Philip Booth
- John Brehm
- Hayden Carruth
- Lucille Clifton
- Billy Collins
- Robert Creeley
- Lydia Davis
- Debra Kang Dean
- Chard deNiord
- Russell Edson
- Lawrence Ferlinghetti
- Dan Gerber
- Louise Glück
- Ray Gonzalez
- John Haines
- Donald Hall
- Jennifer Michael Hecht
- Bob Hicok
- Jane Hirshfield
- Tony Hoagland
- John Hollander
- Amy Holman
- David Ignatow
- Gray Jacobik
- Josephine Jacobsen
- Louis Jenkins
- Mary Karr
- X. J. Kennedy
- Galway Kinnell
- Carolyn Kizer
- Ron Koertge
- Yusef Komunyakaa
- William Kulik
- James Laughlin
- Dorianne Laux
- Li-Young Lee
- Denise Levertov
- Philip Levine
- David Mamet
- Gigi Marks
- William Matthews
- Wesley McNair
- Czesław Miłosz
- Joan Murray
- Sharon Olds
- Mary Oliver
- Franco Pagnucci
- Molly Peacock
- Alberto Ríos
- David Ray
- Adrienne Rich
- Kay Ryan
- Sonia Sanchez
- Revan Schendler
- Myra Shapiro
- Charles Simic
- Louis Simpson
- Thomas R. Smith
- Marcia Southwick
- William Stafford
- Peggy Steele
- Ruth Stone
- Larissa Szporluk
- Diane Thiel
- David Wagoner
- Richard Wilbur
- C.K. Williams
- Charles Wright
- Timothy Young

== Works published in other languages ==
Listed by nation where the work was first published and again by the poet's native land, if different; substantially revised works listed separately:

=== French language ===
- Yves Bonnefoy, La Pluie d'été, France
- Claude Esteban, Janvier, février, mars. Pages, Farrago; France
- Madeleine Gagnon, Rêve de pierre, Montréal, VLB; Canada
- Michel Houellebecq, Renaissance, poèmes, Flammarion; France
- Valérie Rouzeau, Pas revoir, France

=== Hungary ===
- György Petri, Amíg lehet

=== India ===
In each section, listed in alphabetical order by first name:

==== Bengali ====
- Joy Goswami Suryo-Pora Chhai, Kolkata: Ananda Publishers, ISBN 81-7215-773-8
- Mallika Sengupta, Kathamanabi, Kolkata: Ananda Publishers
- Nirendranath Chakravarti, Onno Gopal, Kolkata: Ananda Publishers
- Udaya Narayana Singh, Anukriti, New Delhi: Sahitya Akademi
- NOBBOIER KOBITA, An anthology of poetry 1990s Bangladesh, edited by Mahbub Kabir, Loak Prokashana, Shahbag, Dhaka.

==== Malayalam ====
- K. Satchidanandan, Theranjedutha Kavithakal, selected poems; Malayalam-language
- P. P. Ramachandran, Kanekkane, winner of the Kerala Sahitya Akademi Award for poetry: Kottayam: DC Books
- Veerankutty, Jalabhoopadam ("Mapping the Waters"), Kozhikode: Papillon

==== Marathi ====
- Dilip Chitre, Ekoon Kavita – 3, Mumbai: Popular Prakashan
- Malika Amar Sheikh:
  - Deharutu, Mumbai: Dr Babasaheb Ambedkar Prabodhini
  - Mahanagar, Mumbai: Dr Babasaheb Ambedkar Prabodhini

==== Oriya ====
- Basudev Sunani, Mahula Bana, Nuapada: Eeshan-Ankit Prakashani
- Bharat Majhi, Agadhu Duari, Varsapallavi, Kendrapara
- Rajendra Kishore Panda, Ishakhela, Cuttack: Cuttack Students' Store

==== Other in India ====
- Ajmer Rode, Leela, considered by critics "a landmark volume in modern Punjabi poetry", according to Arundhathi Subramaniam; London, Vancouver: The Rainbird Press, ISBN 0-9690504-9-6
- Amarjit Chandan, Guthli, Kitab Tirinjan, Lahore; Punjabi-language
- Chandrakanta Murasingh; Kokborok-language:
  - Lok Chethuwang Lok, Krishnanagar: Akshar Publications
  - Pindi Watawi Pin, Agartala: Hachukni Khorang Publisher
- Jiban Narah, Suwaranir San, Guwahati, Assam: Jyoti-Prakashan; Assamese-language
- Mamta Sagar, Nadiya Neerina Teva, Bangalore: Ila Prakashana, Kannada-language
- K. Siva Reddy, Telugu-language:
  - Varsham, Varsham, Hyderabad: Jhari Poetry Circle
  - Jaitrayatra, Hyderabad: Sivareddy Mithrulu
- Thangjam Ibopishak Singh, Mayadesh ("The Land of Maya"), Imphal: Writer's Forum; Meitei language poet and academic
- Vaidehi, pen name of Janaki Srinivasa Murthy, Parijatha, Bangalore: Christ College Kannada Sangha, Kannada-language

=== Poland ===
- Zbigniew Herbert, Podwójny oddech. Prawdziwa historia nieskończonej miłości. Wiersze dotąd niepublikowane, Gdynia: Małgorzata Marchlewska Wydawnictwo (posthumous)
- Tymoteusz Karpowicz, Słoje zadrzewne ("Tree Rings"), the work stirred "a literary sensation" in Poland, according to critic Tomasz Tabako Wrocław: Wydawnictwo Dolnośląskie
- Ewa Lipska, 1999, Kraków: Wydawnictwo literackie
- Tadeusz Różewicz, Matka odchodzi ("Mother Departs"), Wrocław: Wydawnictwo Dolnośląskie
- Tomasz Różycki, Anima, Zielona Sowa, Kraków
- Jarosław Marek Rymkiewicz, Znak niejasny, baśń półżywa ("The Unclear sign, a Half-living Legend"), Warsaw: Państwowy Instytut Wydawniczy
- Piotr Sommer, Piosenka pasterska
- Jan Twardowski, Miłość miłości szuka, t. 1-2, Warsaw: PIW, Księgarnia i Drukarnia Świętego Wojciecha
- Eugeniusz Tkaczyszyn-Dycki, Kamień pełen pokarmu. Księga wierszy z lat 1987-1999
- Adam Zagajewski, Pragnienie, Kraków: a5

=== Serbia ===
- Dejan Stojanović, Sunce sebe gleda (The Sun Watches Itself), Književna reč, Beograd, 1999

=== Spain ===
- Matilde Camus:
  - Clamor del pensamiento ("Clamour of thought")
  - Cancionero multicolor ("Multicolour collection of verses")
  - La estrellita Giroldina ("Giroldina the star")

=== Other languages ===
- Christoph Buchwald, general editor, and Raoul Schrott, guest editor, Jahrbuch der Lyrik 1999/2000 ("Poetry Yearbook 1999/2000"), publisher: Beck; anthology
- Luo Fu, Silent Falls the Snow, Chinese (Taiwan)
- Aharon Shabtai, Politiqa (Hebrew: "Politics")
- Maria Luisa Spaziani, Italy:
  - Un fresco castagneto
  - La radice del mare
- Marie Šťastná, Jarním pokrytcům ("To Spring Hypocrites"), Czech Republic
- Yu Jian, Yi mei chuanguo tiankong de dingzi China

== Awards and honors ==
- Nobel prize: Günter Grass

=== Australia ===
- C. J. Dennis Prize for Poetry: Gig Ryan, Pure and Applied
- Dinny O'Hearn Poetry Prize: The Impossible, and other Poems by R. A. Simpson
- Kenneth Slessor Prize for Poetry: Lee Cataldi, Race Against Time
- Miles Franklin Award: Murray Bail, Eucalyptus

=== Canada ===
- Gerald Lampert Award: Stephanie Bolster, White Stone: The Alice Poems
- Archibald Lampman Award: John Barton, Sweet Ellipsis
- Atlantic Poetry Prize: John Steffler, That Night We Were Ravenous
- 1999 Governor General's Awards: Jan Zwicky, Songs for Relinquishing the Earth (English); Herménégilde Chiasson, Conversations (French)
- Pat Lowther Award: Hilary Clark, More Light
- Prix Alain-Grandbois: Hugues Corriveau, Le Livre du frère
- Dorothy Livesay Poetry Prize: David Zieroth, How I Joined Humanity at Last
- Prix Émile-Nelligan: Jean-Éric Riopel, Papillons réfractaires

=== New Zealand ===
- Prime Minister's Awards for Literary Achievement:
- Montana New Zealand Book Awards (no poetry winner this year) First-book award for poetry: Kate Camp, Unfamiliar Legends of the Stars, Victoria University Press

=== United Kingdom ===
- Cholmondeley Award: Vicki Feaver, Geoffrey Hill, Elma Mitchell, Sheenagh Pugh
- Eric Gregory Award: Ross Cogan, Matthew Hollis, Helen Ivory, Andrew Pidoux, Owen Sheers, Dan Wyke
- Forward Poetry Prize Best Collection: Jo Shapcott, My Life Asleep (Oxford University Press)
- Forward Poetry Prize Best First Collection: Nick Drake, The Man in the White Suit (Bloodaxe)
- Poet Laureate of Great Britain: Andrew Motion appointed
- Samuel Johnson Prize: Antony Beevor, Stalingrad
- T. S. Eliot Prize (United Kingdom and Ireland): Hugo Williams, Billy's Rain
- Whitbread Best Book Award: Seamus Heaney, Beowulf

=== United States ===
- Agnes Lynch Starrett Poetry Prize: Daisy Fried, She Didn't Mean To Do It
- Aiken Taylor Award for Modern American Poetry: George Garrett
- Arthur Rense Prize awarded to James McMichael by the American Academy of Arts and Letters
- Bernard F. Connors Prize for Poetry: J.D. McClatchy, "Tattoos"
- Bollingen Prize: Robert Creeley
- Frost Medal: Barbara Guest
- National Book Award for poetry: Ai, Vice: New & Selected Poems
- Special Bicentential Consultants in Poetry to the Library of Congress: Rita Dove, Louise Glück, and W.S. Merwin appointed
- Pulitzer Prize for Poetry: Mark Strand, Blizzard of One
- Rhysling Award:
  - Bruce Boston, Confessions of a Body Thief (Long Form)
  - Laurel Winter, egg horror poem (Short Form)
- Robert Fitzgerald Prosody Award: Derek Attridge
- Ruth Lilly Poetry Prize: Maxine Kumin
- Wallace Stevens Award: Jackson Mac Low
- Whiting Awards: Michael Haskell, Terrance Hayes, Martha Zweig
- William Carlos Williams Award: B.H. Fairchild, The Art of the Lathe (Working Classics), Judge: Garrett Hongo
- Fellowship of the Academy of American Poets: Gwendolyn Brooks

== Deaths ==
Birth years link to the corresponding "[year] in poetry" article:

- January 13 – John Frederick Nims, 86, American poet
- February 18 – Felipe Alfau, 96 (born 1902), Spanish-American poet, translator and author
- February 22 – William Bronk, 81, American poet
- May 10 – Shel Silverstein, 68, American children's poet
- July 4 – Mark O'Brien, 49, American poet
- August 15 – Patricia Beer, 79, English poet and critic
- September 8 – Moondog (aka Louis T. Hardin), 83, American street poet
- October 9 – João Cabral de Melo Neto, 79, Brazilian poet and diplomat
- November 14 – Ida Affleck Graves, 97, Indian-born English poet
- November 22 – Sufia Kamal, 88 (born 1911), Bengali poet, writer, organizer, feminist and activist
- December 10 – Edward Dorn, 70, American poet associated with the Black Mountain poets

== See also ==
- Poetry
- List of years in poetry
- List of poetry awards
