= The Best American Poetry 1999 =

The Best American Poetry 1999, a volume in The Best American Poetry series, was edited by David Lehman and by guest editor Robert Bly.

== Poets and poems included ==
Poet	Poem	Where poem previously appeared
Dick Allen	"The Selfishness of the Poetry Reader"	The Café Review
John Balaban	"Story"	Verse
Coleman Barks	"Bill Matthews Coming Along (1942-1997)"	Figdust
George Bilgere	"Catch"	The Sewanee Review
Elizabeth Bishop	"Foreign-Domestic"	Conjunctions
Chana Bloch	"Tired Sex"	The Atlantic Monthly
Philip Booth	"Narrow Road, Presidents' Day"	American Poetry Review
John Brehm	"Sea of Faith"	The Southern Review
Hayden Carruth	"Because I Am"	Seneca Review
Lucille Clifton	"the mississippi river empties into the gulf"	River City
Billy Collins	"Dharma"	Poetry
Robert Creeley	"Mitch"	Solo
Lydia Davis	"Betrayal"	Hambone
Debra Kang Dean	"Taproot"	Crab Orchard Review
Chard deNiord	"Pasternak"	New England Review
Russell Edson	"Madam's Heart"	The Prose Poem
Lawrence Ferlinghetti	"A Buddha in the Woodpile"	Blasts
Dan Gerber	"My Father's Fields"	Poetry
Louise Glück	"Vita Nova"	The New Yorker
Ray Gonzalez	"Breastbone"	The Bitter Oleander
John Haines	"The Last Election"	Many Mountains Moving
Donald Hall	"Smile"	The Yale Review
Jennifer Michael Hecht	"September"	The Antioch Review
Bob Hicok	"What Would Freud Say?"	Cream City Review
Jane Hirshfield	"The Envoy"	Blue Sofa
Tony Hoagland	"Lawrence"	Ploughshares
John Hollander	"Beach Whispers"	The New Yorker
Amy Holman	"Man Script"	Literal Latte
David Ignatow	"The Story of Progress"	Verse
Gray Jacobik	"The Circle Theatre"	Alkali Flats
Josephine Jacobsen	"Last Will and Testament"	Potomac Review
Louis Jenkins	"Two Prose Poems"	Rosebud
Mary Karr	"The Patient"	Poetry
X. J. Kennedy	"A Curse on a Thief"	Harvard Review
Galway Kinnell	"Why Regret?"	The New Yorker
Carolyn Kizer	"The Erotic Philosophers"	The Yale Review
Ron Koertge	"1989"	Solo
Yusef Komunyakaa	"Scapegoat"	Ontario Review
William Kulik	"The Triumph of Narcissus and Aphrodite"	Black Warrior Review
James Laughlin	"Nunc Dimittis"	DoubleTake
Dorianne Laux	"The Shipfitter's Wife"	DoubleTake
Li-Young Lee	"The Sleepless Grape"	Water Stone
Denise Levertov	"First Love"	Kalliope
Philip Levine	"The Return"	The Atlantic Monthly
David Mamet	"A Charade"	Ploughshares
Gigi Marks	"The Swim"	Poetry
William Matthews	"Misgivings"	Poetry
Wesley McNair	"The Characters of Dirty Jokes"	Mid-American Review
Czesław Miłosz	"A Ball"	Partisan Review
Joan Murray	from "Sonny's Face. Sonny's Hands"	The Southern Review
Sharon Olds	"What It Meant"	The Southern Review
Mary Oliver	"Flare"	Shenandoah
Franco Pagnucci	"And Now"	Acorn
Molly Peacock	"Say You Love Me"	Fence
Alberto Ríos	"Writing from Memory"	Meridian
David Ray	"Hemingway's Garden"	New Millennium Writings
Adrienne Rich	"Seven Skins"	The Progressive
Kay Ryan	"That Will to Divest"	The Yale Review
Sonia Sanchez	"Last recording session/for papa joe"	Painted Bride Quarterly
Revan Schendler	"The Public and the Private Spheres"	Salmagundi
Myra Shapiro	"Longing and Wonder"	Common Sense
Charles Simic	"Barber College Haircut"	AGNI
Louis Simpson	"A Shearling Coat"	The Hudson Review
Thomas R. Smith	"Housewarming"	AGNI
Marcia Southwick	"A Star Is Born in the Eagle Nebula"	The Gettysburg Review
William Stafford	"Ways to Live"	Cream City Review
Peggy Steele	"The Drunkard's Daughter"	Blue Sofa
Ruth Stone	"A Moment"	Paterson Literary Review
Larissa Szporluk	"Deer Crossing the Sea"	Green Mountains Review
Diane Thiel	"The Minefield"	Tor House Newsletter
David Wagoner	"Thoreau and the Crickets"	Ploughshares
Richard Wilbur	"This Pleasing Anxious Being"	The New Yorker
C.K. Williams	"Archetypes"	Ontario Review
Charles Wright	"American Twilight"	Partisan Review
Timothy Young	"The Thread of Sunlight"	The Journal of Family Life

== See also ==
- 1999 in poetry
