= Thomas R. Smith =

Thomas R. Smith may refer to:

- Thomas Rhett Smith (1768–1829), intendant (mayor) of Charleston, South Carolina
- Thomas Roger Smith (1830–1903), English architect
- Thomas Rudolph Smith (1869–1958), English surgeon
- Thomas R. Smith (poet)

== See also ==
- R. Thomas Smith, American racehorse trainer
