= Bill Glose =

American writer

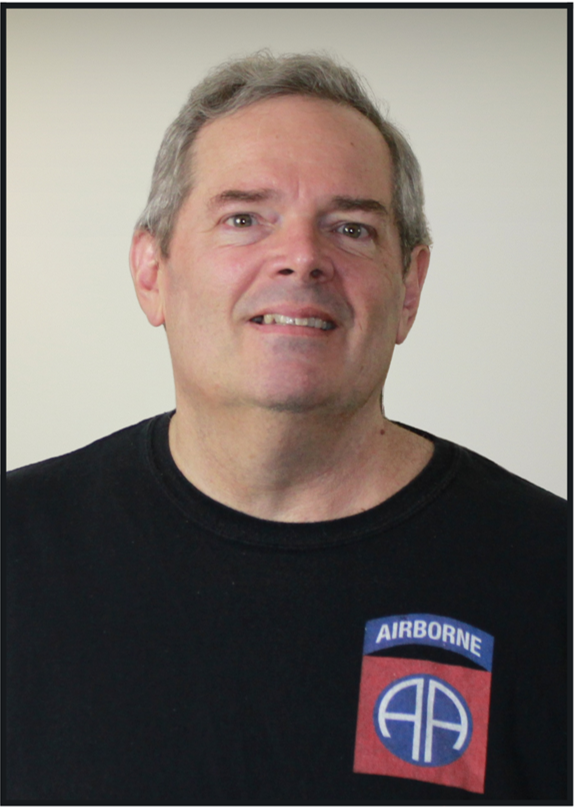
- Glose in 2022

Bill Glose (born Riverside, California) is an American journalist, poet, and fiction writer. He is best known for winning the 2023 Library of Virginia Award for Fiction for his book All the Ruined Men, which tells the stories of veterans struggling to adjust to civilian life after years of war in Iraq and Afghanistan.

== Personal life ==
Born into a US Air Force family, Bill Glose spent much of his childhood on military bases in foreign countries—Japan, then Okinawa, then England. His father, John Glose, was a fighter-bomber pilot who flew an F4 Phantom during the Vietnam War. In 1979, John was stationed at Langley Air Force Base in Hampton Roads and ever since Bill has called Virginia his home. Glose graduated from Virginia Tech in 1989 with a BS in civil engineering.

After graduation, Glose was commissioned as an Army officer and paratrooper assigned to the 82nd Airborne Division at Fort Bragg. He commanded a rifle platoon in combat during the Gulf War and later commanded a Delta (anti-tank) platoon. He earned Airborne, Ranger, Jumpmaster and Combat Infantryman badges during his military career.

After he got out of the Army in 1995, Glose spent three years working in factories in Chicago and Holyoke, Massachusetts. In 1998, he walked away from his production career to become a full-time writer.

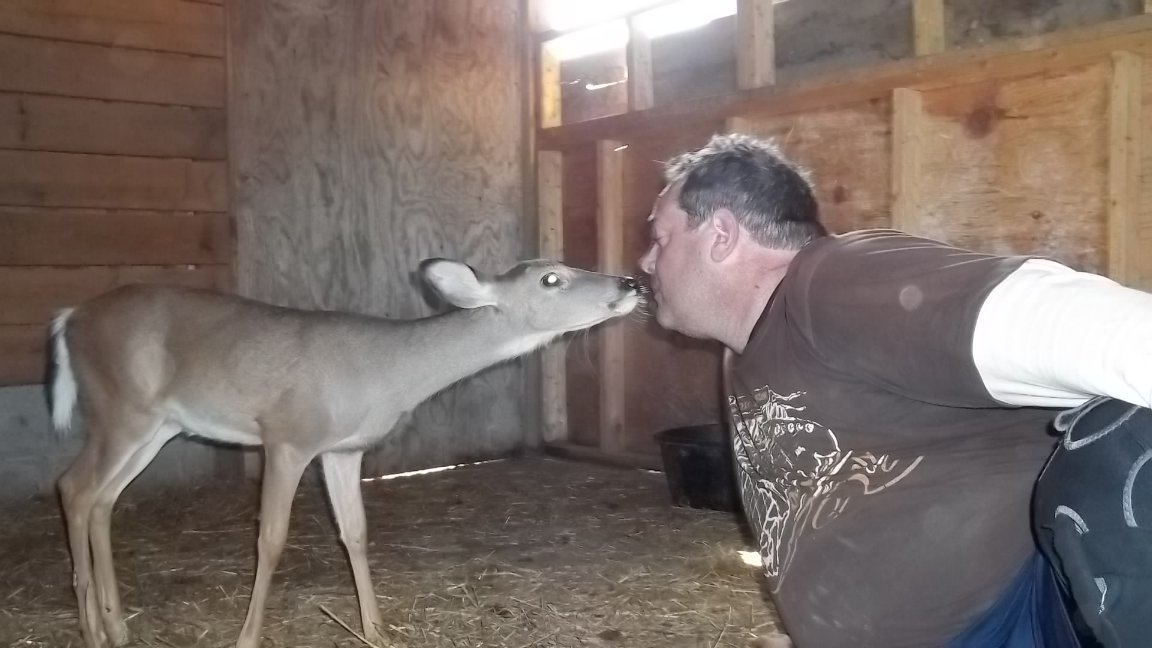
Bill Glose kissing a fawn on a stop during his Walk Across Virginia

In 2009, Glose began a walk across Virginia that would eventually zigzag through every region in the state, cross each of the six state borders (including Washington DC), and eventually cover over 1,500 miles. The start point was the First Landing Monument in Virginia Beach and the endpoint was the Cumberland Gap in Tennessee. Among his many adventures during this walk he petted a full-grown buffalo, kissed a fawn on the mouth, rode on the country's last pole-driven ferry, jumped off a cliff into a water-filled quarry, and participated in a world-record-setting skinny dip at a naturist resort.

=== Writing career ===
As a freelancer, Bill Glose has written hundreds of articles and essays for The Writer, The Sun (magazine), Southern Arts Journal, and numerous other publications. During the 1999 college football season he wrote for The Pigskin Post as their Big East correspondent. That same year, he began reviewing books for The Virginian-Pilot, which led to his position as a contributing editor at Virginia Living (March 2003-April 2020). In 2005, Glose became a feature writer for Super Lawyers magazine, interviewing and writing profiles about top national lawyers. He has also worked as a technical writer for Newport News Shipbuilding and as a writing coach with Professional English, where he coached NASA scientists, business managers and students.

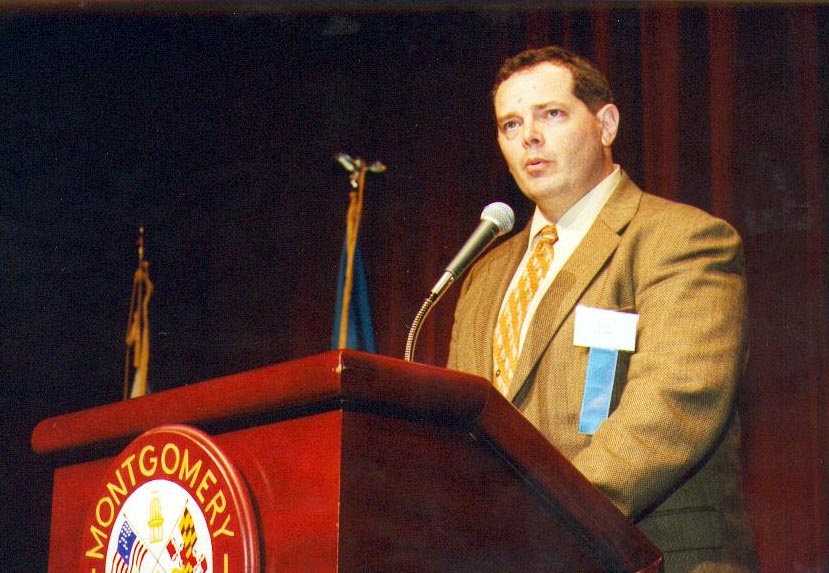
Bill Glose speaking at the 2001 F. Scott Fitzgerald Literary Conference

Glose has also written many short stories and poems for Rattle (magazine), Narrative Magazine, and The Missouri Review, among others. In describing his stance on writing in many genres, he said, “Articles are my meat and potatoes; fiction and poetry, the dessert.” His fiction has been published in four countries (United States, Canada, England, Ireland) and has won numerous awards.

In 2000, he launched the literary journal Virginia Adversaria, serving as its publisher and editor-in-chief. One of his highlights during the journal's three-year existence was publishing a short story, “The Cherry Man,” by Khaled Hosseini before Hosseini became internationally famous.

From 2015 to 2016, Glose served as the Vice President for the Eastern Region of the Poetry Society of Virginia and from 2020 to 2023, he served as the Society's President Pro Tempore. Garrison Keillor selected Glose as the featured poet on The Writer's Almanac for July 1, 2017. In 2024, Bill Glose was one of the poets chosen to represent the East Coast on World Poetry Day (March 21) during a 24-hour poetry reading that spanned the globe.

Glose has written extensively about his and other veterans' combat experiences. His Lit Hub essay, After Combat, Writing the Horrific Stories of War, details his process of writing fiction about veterans of the wars in Iraq and Afghanistan. In 2021, his fifth book of poetry, Postscript to War, was a finalist for the Library of Virginia Award for Poetry. In 2022, St. Martin's Press published Glose's All the Ruined Men, a collection of linked short stories about veterans facing difficulties at home after years of war. The Millions named All the Ruined Men one of the most anticipated books of the second half of 2022 and in 2023, All the Ruined Men, won the Library of Virginia Award for Fiction.

== Awards ==
- 2023 Winner of The Library of Virginia Award for Fiction
- 2020 Winner of The Dateline Award for Excellence in Journalism (Trade Journal category)
- 2020 Winner of The Main Street Rag Poetry Book Award
- 2019 Winner of The Robert Bausch Fiction Award
- 2019 Winner of Missouri Humanities Council Award for Veteran's Poetry
- 2018 Winner of The Heroes' Voices Poetry Contest
- 2017 Winner of Missouri Humanities Council Award for Veteran's Interviews
- 2016 Winner of the October Rattle Ekphrastic Challenge (Artist's Choice)
- 2016 Winner of Missouri Humanities Council Award for Veteran's Poetry
- 2011 Daily Press Poet Laureate
- 2008 West Virginia Poetry Society Morgantown Chapter Award
- 2004 Virginia Press Association First Place Award for Sports News Writing
- 2001 F. Scott Fitzgerald Short Story Award
- First place awards from Poetry Society of Virginia for: The Bess Gresham Memorial (2020); The Sarah Lockwood Memorial (2019); The Charlotte Wise Memorial (2019); The Honoring Fatherhood Award (2017, 2018); The Judah, Sarah, Grace and Tom Memorial (2018); The Raymond Levi Haislip Memorial Award (2017); The "Handy Andy" Prize (2017); The Nancy Byrd Turner Memorial Award (2016)

== Books ==
- All the Ruined Men. St. Martin's Press. 2022. ISBN 978-1250279880
- Postscript to War. Main Street Rag Press. 2020. ISBN 978-1599488332
- Virginia Walkabout. San Francisco Bay Press. 2018. ISBN 978-0996835046
- Personal Geography. David Robert Books. 2016. ISBN 978-1625491688
- Half a Man. FutureCycle Press. 2013. ISBN 978-1938853494
- Ten Twisted Tales (as editor). San Francisco Bay Press. 2008. ISBN 978-1604610062
- The Human Touch. San Francisco Bay Press. 2007. ISBN 978-1604610000

== Chapbooks ==
- Memory of Spring. Orchard Street Press. 2021. ISBN 978-1954449039
- Child of the Movies. Finishing Line Press. 2019. ISBN 978-1646620203

== Reviews ==
=== All the Ruined Men ===
Publishers Weekly: “Glose writes about the emotions that assault soldiers coming home from a combat zone and confronting a world that no longer makes sense... This sterling collection stands with Tim O’Brien’s "The Things They Carried.”

The Christian Science Monitor: “Glose's book is a privilege to read, a tribute to his comrades in war and peace, a divulgence of truth that gives necessary attention to veterans and their families. At the same time, it is a call to society for increased compassion for these men and women.”

Kirkus Reviews: “Glose adds his impressive voice to those of writers like Kevin Powers and Phil Klay...A collection of painfully honest and consistently empathetic glimpses of modern American soldiers in war and peace.”

=== Half a Man ===
Richard B. Myers (General, USAF, Ret. 15th Chairman of the Joint Chiefs of Staff): “Bill Glose's poetry brings the last 12 years of war in the Middle East and Central Asia into sharp focus. He elicits all the many emotions that a soldier experiences and allows us a rare glimpse into how the people fighting and those caught up in conflict see war. Everyone will learn from this work.”

=== Virginia Walkabout ===
Jackie Mohan: “Virginia is in good hands as Glose's well-honed expertise with language and lyricism takes the reader on a journey across the state. While some poems ruminate on nature more generally, his poems are strongest when he describes the quirks and histories of specific locations, from Tangier Island to the James River to Norfolk, such as how Norfolk got its mermaids. His poems also tell the stories of the people he encountered along his way, from notable figures of times long gone, such as Capt. John Smith, to the lives of Virginians today.”

=== The Human Touch ===
Lyn C. A. Gardner: “This accomplished collection by a Hampton Roads' poet touches both the horrors and wonders of human life, providing philosophical reflections about life and relationships and taking the time to understand and empathize with both strangers and family. Starting from his own encounters but reaching far beyond them, Bill Glose succeeds admirably at the difficult task of making the poet's specific, personal experience universal.”
