= Adalaide Morris =

American modern poetry critic

Adalaide Morris (née Dee) is an American critic for modern poetry including information art, counter mapping, documentary, electronic literature, and digital works.

== Career ==
She taught at the University of Iowa from 1974. While at the University of Iowa, she served as English Department Chair and also was an advisory board chair to The Iowa Review and the GRE Literature in English committee.

== Critical and academic work ==
N. Katherine Hayles in Electronic Literature particularly mentions that Adalaide Morris as a critic connected with digital art, literature, and games with traditional critical approaches and philosophy. She further explains that Adalaide Morris focuses on networked and programs (code) to link digital art, literature, and games rather than on theoretical concerns.

== Published works ==
Morris published critical works and journal articles on poetry, particularly focusing on the digital aspects of poetry. She also edited publications about experimental writing and new media. as well as modern poetry and pedagogy.

- New Media Poetics: Contexts, Technotexts, and Theories. A collection of 15 essays, coedited with Thom Swiss, growing out of a conference on digital poetics held October 10–13, 2002, at the University of Iowa. Contributors include John Cayley, Alan Filreis, Kenneth Goldsmith, N. Katherine Hayles, Talan Memmott, Marjorie Perloff, Stephanie Strickland, and Barrett Watten. Cambridge, MA: MIT Press, 2006. Adalaide Morris edited New Media Poetics: Contexts, Technotexts, and Theories, ed. Adalaide Morris and Thomas Swiss (Cambridge: MIT Press, 2006). This collection showcases essays and artist statements to introduce electronic literature, which was published and available from various sources, including UbuWeb, PennSound, and the Electronic Poetry Center. Contributors include: Giselle Beiguelman, John Cayley, Alan Filreis, Loss Pequeño Glazier, Alan Golding, Kenneth Goldsmith, N. Katherine Hayles, Cynthia Lawson, Jennifer Ley, Talan Memmott, Adalaide Morris, Carrie Noland, Marjorie Perloff, William Poundstone, Martin Spinelli, Stephanie Strickland, Brian Kim Stefans, Barrett Watten, Darren Wershler-Henry.

Morris studied H.D.'s poetics, including, How to Live / What to Do: H.D.’s Cultural Poetics. University of Illinois Press, 2003. Reissued in paperback, 2008.

Morris' essay in 2000, Angles of Incidence / Angels of Dust: Operatic Tilt in the Poetics of H.D. and Nathaniel Mackey compares Hilda Doolittle (H.D.)'s work with Nathaniel Mackey's work was reviewed in the American Book Review.

Morris examined "thinkertoys" (Ted Nelson's term) in the Electronic Literature Organization's Volume 1 in the Electronic Book Review, How to Think with Tinkertoys.

Her collection of essays Sound States: Innovative Poetics and Acoustical Technologies focuses on the interplay between radio, tape, and loudspeaker technologies and modern and postmodern poetry and fiction, including contributions by Michael Davidson, Katherine Hayles, Marjorie Perloff, Jed Rasula, Garrett Stewart, and others, published with audio CD. Chapel Hill & London: University of North Carolina Press, January 1998.

- Extended Outlooks: The Iowa Review Collection of Contemporary Women Writers. Edited with Jane Cooper, Gwen Head, and Marcia Southwick. New York: Macmillan, 1982.
- Wallace Stevens: Imagination and Faith. Princeton: Princeton UP, 1974

== Critical reception and external collections ==
Her works were reviewed in the Chronicle of Higher Education, 17 February 1998, p. 24. Her papers are collected at the University of Iowa. These papers are from 1971 - 2001 and consist of her poetry and publications.

== Awards and fellowships ==
University of Iowa

- Graduate College Outstanding Faculty Mentor Award, Arts and Humanities, 2011
- John C. Gerber Distinguished Professorship in English, 2000–10
- Regents’ Award for Faculty Excellence, 2000
- Michael J. Brody Award for Faculty Excellence,
- CIC Academic Leadership Fellow, 1995–96
