= Religious skepticism =

Type of skepticism relating to religion

Religious skepticism is a type of skepticism relating to religion. Religious skeptics question religious authority and are not necessarily antireligious/clerical but rather are skeptical of either specific or all religious beliefs and/or practices. Socrates was one of the most prominent and first religious skeptics of whom there are records; he questioned the legitimacy of the beliefs of his time in the existence of the Greek gods. Religious skepticism is not the same as atheism or agnosticism, and some religious skeptics are deists (or theists who reject the prevailing organized religion they encounter, or even all organized religion).

== Overview ==
The word skeptic is derived from the Greek word skeptikos, meaning inquiring, which was used to refer to members of the Hellenistic philosophical school of Pyrrhonism which doubted the possibility of knowledge. As such, religious skepticism generally refers to doubting or questioning something about religion. Although, as noted by Schellenberg the term is sometimes more generally applied to anyone that has a negative view of religion.

The majority of skeptics are agnostics and atheists, but there are also a number of religious people that are skeptical of religion. The religious are generally skeptical about claims of other religions, at least when the two denominations conflict concerning some stated belief. Some philosophers put forth the sheer diversity of religion as a justification for skepticism by theists and nontheists alike. Theists are also generally skeptical of the claims put forth by atheists.

Michael Shermer wrote that religious skepticism is a process for discovering the truth rather than general nonacceptance. For this reason a religious skeptic might believe that Jesus existed while questioning claims that he was the messiah or performed miracles (see historicity of Jesus). Thomas Jefferson's The Life and Morals of Jesus of Nazareth, a literal cut and paste of the New Testament that removes anything supernatural, is a prominent example.

== History ==
=== Ancient history ===
Ancient Greece was a polytheistic society in which the gods were not omnipotent and required sacrifice and ritual. The earliest beginnings of religious skepticism can be traced back to Xenophanes. He critiqued popular religion of his time, particularly false conceptions of the divine that are a byproduct of the human propensity to anthropomorphize deities. He took the scripture of his time to task for painting the gods in a negative light and promoted a more rational view of religion. He was very critical of religious people privileging their belief system over others without sound reason.

Socrates' conception of the divine was that the gods were always benevolent, truthful, authoritative, and wise. Divinity was to operate within the standards of rationality. This critique of established religion ultimately resulted in his trial for impiety and corruption as documented in The Apology. The historian Will Durant writes that Plato was "as skeptical of atheism as of any other dogma."

Democritus was the father of materialism in the West, and there is no trace of a belief in any afterlife in his work. Specifically, in Those in Hades he refers to constituents of the soul as atoms that dissolve upon death. This later inspired the philosopher Epicurus and the philosophy he founded, who held a materialist view and rejected any afterlife, while further claiming the gods were also uninterested in human affairs. In the poem De rerum natura Lucretius proclaimed Epicurean philosophy, that the universe operates according to physical principles and guided by fortuna, or chance, instead of the Roman gods.

In De Natura Deorum, the Academic Skeptic philosopher Cicero presented arguments against the Stoics calling into question the character of the gods, whether or not they participate in earthly affairs, and questions their existence.

In ancient India, there was a materialist philosophical school called the Cārvāka, who were known as being skeptical of the religious claims of Vedic religion, its rituals and texts. A forerunner to the Charvaka school, philosopher Ajita Kesakambali, did not believe in reincarnation.

=== Early modern history ===
Thomas Hobbes took positions that strongly disagreed with orthodox Christian teachings. He argued repeatedly that there are no incorporeal substances, and that all things, even God, heaven, and hell are corporeal, matter in motion. He argued that "though Scripture acknowledge spirits, yet doth it nowhere say, that they are incorporeal, meaning thereby without dimensions and quantity".

Voltaire, although himself a deist, was a forceful critic of religion and advocated for acceptance of all religions as well as separation of church and state. In Japan, Yamagata Bantō (d. 1821) declared that "in this world there are no gods, Buddhas, or ghosts, nor are there strange or miraculous things".

== Modern religious skepticism ==
The term has morphed into one that typically emphasizes scientific and historical methods of evidence. There are some skeptics that question whether religion is a viable topic for criticism given that it doesn't require proof for belief. Others, however, insist it is as much as any other knowledge, especially when it makes claims that contradict those made by science.

There has been much work since the late 20th century by philosophers such as Schellenburg and Moser, and both have written numerous books pertaining to the topic. Much of their work has focused on defining what religion is and specifically what people are skeptical of about it. The work of others have argued for the viability of religious skepticism by appeal to higher-order evidence (evidence about our evidence and our capacities for evaluation), what some call meta-evidence.

There are still echoes of early Greek skepticism in the way some current thinkers question the intellectual viability of belief in the divine. In modern times there is a certain amount of mistrust and lack of acceptance of religious skeptics, particularly towards those that are also atheists. This is coupled with concerns many skeptics have about the government in countries, such as the US, where separation of church and state are central tenets.

== See also ==
- Doubt: A History
- Irreligion
- Relationship between religion and science
- Scientific skepticism
