= Rattle (magazine) =

American poetry magazine

- Summer 2010 cover
- Editor-in-Chief: Alan Fox
- Editor: Timothy Green
- Creative Editor: Katie Dozier
- Associate Editor: Megan O'Reilly
- Former editors: Stellasue Lee
- Categories: Literary magazine
- Frequency: Quarterly
- Paid circulation: 9,500
- Unpaid circulation: 2,000
- Founded: 1994 (32 years ago)
- Company: Rattle Foundation
- Country: United States
- Based in: Los Angeles, California
- Language: English
- Website: rattle.com
- ISSN: 1097-2900
- OCLC: 36334564

Rattle is a poetry magazine founded in 1994, published in Los Angeles in the United States. The print magazine is published quarterly, with a poem also published daily through its website, and through its "Daily Poem" email. Rattle receives around 250,000 poetry submissions a year, and publishes around .02%.

It publishes poems both by established writers, such as Philip Levine, Li-Young Lee, Jane Hirshfield, Billy Collins, Sharon Olds, Gregory Orr, Patricia Smith, and Anis Mojgani, and by new and emerging poets. Poems from the magazine have been reprinted in The Best American Poetry and Pushcart Prize anthologies. Rattle does not solicit poems for publication, and instead follow's editor Timothy Green's guidelines of curation over publication. This means that Rattle will consider poems that the poet has shared before on their blog or social media.

Each issue is themed to honor a particular community of poets, such as teachers, slam poets, Los Angeles poets, NFT poets, Musicians, and the Haibun form. Interviews with contemporary poets are also a staple of the quarterly print issue.

== The Rattlecast ==
For over four years, Rattle has broadcast a weekly poetry show, primarily hosted on YouTube, called the Rattlecast. Editor and host Timothy Green typically begins by sharing the Poet's Respond poem of that week, often with the chosen poet reading their own poem live for viewers. Green then bring on the main guest, a poet that has been published by Rattle, for a conversation and a poetry reading from their book(s). Guests have included Robert Pinsky, Naomi Shihab Nye, Dorianne Laux, Ellen Bass, and Bob Hicok.

The second half of the Rattlecast is known as the "Prompt Lines." Each week, associate editor Katie Dozier joins the live show and shares a poetry prompt. The segment begins with Green and Dozier sharing their own prompt poems before opening it up to the other poets. There is a one page/3-minute max for poets that chose to read a poem. Every month, Dozier selects a prompt poem for publication on Rattle's website.

== The Critique of the Week ==
Rattle also has a weekly free live poetry workshop, hosted by Timothy Green on YouTube. Viewers can submit their own poems, through Submittable, in order to be considered for critique live on air.

== The Rattle Chapbook Prize ==
The Rattle Chapbook Prize has been awarded annually since 2016. It currently comprises three awards of $5,000, paid to the authors of the best chapbooks submitted. At least one of the awards is bestowed on a poet who has not previously published a full-length collection of poems.

The contest's annual closing date is January 15th, and the winners are announced on April 15th every year. As with the Rattle Poetry Prize, the contest's entry fee is the same as a one-year subscription to the magazine, which includes an annual subscription for entrants.

Year	Winners
2016	Zeina Hashem Beck
2017	Taylor Mali
2018	Raquel Vasquez Gilliland, Nickole Brown, Elizabeth S. Wolf
2019	Al Ortolani, Christina Olson, Jimmy Pappas
2020	Kathleen McClung, Tom C. Hunley, Jesse Bertron
2021	Gil Arzola, Amanda Newell, Elizabeth Johnston Ambrose
2022	Michael Mark, CooXooEii Black, and John W Evans
2023	Arthur Russell, Miracle Thornton, George Bilgere
2024	Eric Kocher, Denise Duhamel, Kat Lehmann
2025	José Enrique Medina, Liz Robbins, Matthew Buckley Smith

== The Rattle Poetry Prize ==
The Rattle Poetry Prize has been awarded annually since 2006, and now comprises an award of $15,000 to the author of the best single poem submitted, as decided by the magazine's editors. Ten finalists also receive prizes, and one of them receives a Readers' Choice Award of $5,000 which is voted on by the current subscribers.

The entry fee is the same as a one-year subscription to the magazine, which includes an annual subscription for entrants. The annual deadline is on July 15, with the winner (and finalists) announced on September 15th. Winning poems are published in the magazine's winter issue as well as online.

Rattle Poetry Prize winners:

Year	Winning Poet	Winning Poem
2025	Morri Creech	"An Ordinary Childhood"
2024	Arthur Russell	"Among Other Things"
2023	Ardon Shorr	"Time Travel for Beginners"
2022	L. Renée	"Shoes"
2021	Ann Giard-Chase	“Encephalon”
2020	Alison Townsend	“Pantoum from the Window of the Room Where I Write”
2019	Matthew Dickman	"Stroke"
2018	Dave Harris	"Turbulence"
2017	Rayon Lennon	"Heard"
2016	Julie Price Pinkerton	"Veins"
2015	Tiana Clark	"Equilibrium"
2014	Craig van Rooyen	"Waiting in Vain"
2013	Roberto Ascalon	"The Fire This Time"
2012	Heidi Shuler	"Trials of a Teenage Transvestite's Single Mother"
2011	Hayden Saunier	"The One and the Other"
2010	Patricia Smith	"Tavern, Tavern, Church, Shuttered Tavern,"
2009	Lynne Knight	"To the Young Man Who Cried Out ‘What Were You Thinking’ When I Backed into His Car"
2008	Joseph Fasano	"Mahler in New York"
2007	Albert Haley	"Barcelona"
2006	Sophia Rivkin	"Conspiracy"

Some of the Rattle Poetry Prize finalists include: Tim Seibles, Roberta Beary, Diana Goetsch, Francesca Bell, George Bilgere, Shannan Mann, Erin Murphy, Mike White, Ron Koertge, Rhina P. Espaillat, Ellen Bass, David Kirby, Wendy Videlock, and Diane Seuss.

== Past contributors ==
Past contributors have included:

- Jimmy Santiago Baca
- Amiri Baraka
- Marvin Bell
- Hayden Carruth
- Lucille Clifton
- Robert Creeley
- Paul Dickey
- Stephen Dobyns
- Mark Doty
- Denise Duhamel
- Sam Hamill
- Jane Hirshfield
- Mark Jarman
- Yusef Komunyakaa
- Li-Young Lee
- Philip Levine
- Anis Mojgani
- Naomi Shihab Nye
- Sharon Olds
- Elisha Porat
- Luis J. Rodriguez
- Alan Shapiro
- Charles Simic
- Patricia Smith
- Meghan Sterling
- Gerald Stern
- David St. John
- Brian Turner
- Diane Wakoski
- Anne Waldman
- C.K. Williams
- Taylor Mali
- Diana Goetsch

== See also ==
- List of literary magazines
- List of United States magazines
