= The End of the Soul =

2003 book by Jennifer Michael Hecht

- Author: Jennifer Michael Hecht
- Language: English
- Genre: Non-fiction
- Publisher: Columbia University Press
- Publication date: 2003
- Publication place: United States

The End of the Soul: Scientific Modernity, Atheism, And Anthropology in France, 1876–1936 by Jennifer Michael Hecht was published in 2003 by Columbia University Press. It tells how a group of leading French citizens, men and women included, joined together to form an unusual group, The Society of Mutual Autopsy, with the aim of proving that souls do not exist. The idea was that, after death, they would dissect each other and (hopefully) show a direct relationship between brain shapes and sizes and the character, abilities and intelligence of individuals. The book argues that this strange scientific pact, and anthropology itself, which the group's members helped to develop, had its genesis in aggressive, evangelical atheism.

Essentially, The End of the Soul is a study of science and atheism in France in late-nineteenth and early-twentieth centuries. It illustrates how anthropology grew in the context of an impassioned struggle between the forces of tradition, especially the Catholic faith, and those of a more freethinking modernism, and posits that it became for many a secular religion. Among the figures discussed are novelist Émile Zola, statesman Leon Gambetta, American birth control advocate Margaret Sanger, and Arthur Conan Doyle.

The End of the Soul received the Ralph Waldo Emerson Award for 2004 from Phi Beta Kappa society as a book that "is an important contribution to knowledge, serious scholarship with a broad pertinence to the human condition."
