= The Leelanau School =

Location
- Glen Arbor, Michigan; United States
- 44.91214°N 85.97138°W

Information
- Type: Boarding High School
- Motto: Straight as the Pine, Sturdy as the Oak.
- Opened: 1929
- CEEB code: 231645
- Principal: Robert Hansen
- Grades: 9–12
- Campus type: Rural
- Mascot: Thunderbirds
- Website: www.leelanau.org

The Leelanau School is a co-educational non-profit boarding high school located in Glen Arbor, Michigan. The school was founded in 1929 and has a historical association with Christian Science. The school is a small, college-preparatory school with 42 acres (170,000 m^{2}) of land with 13 year-round and 9 seasonal building structures. The school has a teacher-to-student ratio between 1:3 and 1:10 for most classes, ranking among the top 20 American boarding schools in that category.

The school is located on the shore of Lake Michigan just outside Glen Arbor, with the Crystal River running through the property. The Lanphier Observatory, with a 13-inch (330 mm) Schmidt-Cassegrain reflector telescope, is also located on the grounds.

== History ==
William M. "Skipper" Beals ca. 1940

Leelanau for Boys was founded in 1929 by William M. "Skipper" Beals and his wife Cora, née Mautz, faculty members at the upper school of The Principia, in response to the popularity of their summer camp for boys on the same site at the mouth of the Crystal River on Sleeping Bear Bay. Originally, the school, like the camp, was intended for boys from Christian Science homes. In the beginning, it offered instruction for grades 7-10 only; its first high school class graduated in 1932, with state accreditation following in 1933. But while the camps—a nearby "sister" camp, Kohahna, for girls, was owned and run by Skipper Beals' sister, Maude Beals Turner—maintain close ties to Christian Science to the present day, the school dropped its official religious denominational focus early on. The camps were separated from the school completely in 1987 and continue under separate management at the Kohahna site.

The school weathered the Great Depression and its popularity created a clientele for the summer resort The Homestead in the mid-1930s (at the time the school was on the same grounds as the resort, now it is adjacent), as well as necessitating the opening of Pinebrook for Girls in 1940. The two schools grew rapidly after World War II and were eventually consolidated as The Leelanau Schools. Beginning in the early 1930s, Arthur S. “Major” Huey became an apprentice to Skipper Beals. In partnership with his wife Helen, née Mautz (Cora Beals’ sister), Huey purchased the schools after Skipper Beals’ death in 1942.

In 1944 growing interest in alpine skiing convinced Major Huey to form the Sugar Loaf Winter Sports Club; as the first president of the club, he hired German émigré Hans "Peppi" Teichner to be its manager in 1946. These steps were decisive for skiing in the Midwest, culminating in the opening of the local ski area Sugar Loaf in 1947. Peppi Teichner, father of television news correspondent Martha Teichner, taught at the school and coached its students in skiing.

Privately owned until 1963, the school became a non-profit corporation with a board of directors upon the Hueys’ creation of The Leelanau Schools and Library Foundation, Inc., to which they gave the camps and the school with its present grounds. In 1967 Cora Beals donated the land that became "faculty row." The non-profit status eased fundraising efforts. The school grounds were exempted from eminent domain associated with the formation of Sleeping Bear Dunes National Lakeshore, which surrounds the campus. Over time its name was shortened to the singular form: The Leelanau School.

At its peak in 1970, the school had 167 enrolled students. School enrollment stabilized at close to 100 students as the 1970s drew to a close.

== Athletics ==
Arthur S. Huey ca. 1960

Traditionally nicknamed Indians, Leelanau students chose to abandon the now-controversial moniker and adopted the name Thunderbirds in 2003 after consultation with members of Grand Traverse Band of Ottawa and Chippewa Indians. It competes as a Class D (smallest of four classes) school in the Michigan High School Athletic Association. In past years, the school fielded teams in cross country, football (until 1975), soccer, volleyball, basketball, alpine skiing, baseball, softball, tennis, golf and track and field, but in recent years has only fielded tennis, golf and volleyball squads. Leelanau was a charter member of the Northwest Conference and garnered most of the Northwest's track titles during its tenure, including every single one in the 1950s, but was forced to leave that organization for the Cherryland Conference when its enrollment dropped in the mid-1970s. Traditional Cherryland rivals include Lake Leelanau St. Mary and Northport. A newer rivalry has begun with Traverse City Christian School since that school's founding in 1995.

Leelanau pioneered alpine skiing as a Michigan high school varsity sport during the 1950s and was instrumental in its adoption as an official MHSAA championship sport, but was forced to abandon the sport when the nearby Sugar Loaf Resort closed in 2000. Leelanau was the MHSAA boys' skiing state runner-up (open classification) in 1992, beaten at the state finals only by Traverse City (now Traverse City Central), a school over 30 times larger. Leelanau is by far the smallest school in Michigan ever to place so high in an MHSAA open (unrestricted by enrollment) state championship. Other accomplishments include:

- 1991 state Class D boys' Alpine skiing regional champions and runner-up state champions
- 1990 state Class D boys' soccer district champions
- 1945 state Class D boys' track and field runners-up
- 1944 state Class D boys' track and field champions
- 1940 state Class C boys' track and field runners-up
- February 17, 1989: Michigan state record for most points in a boys' basketball game (171) against Free Soil
  - Combined with Free Soil's 94 points, both teams' total of 265 is also a state record, while Anton Phillips' 84 for Leelanau that day is still the most points scored by a Michigan high schooler since 1911.

During the summer months, the campus' comfortable temperatures and north woods setting plays host to several NCAA varsity squads' preseason training camps, including cross-country and volleyball squads from the University of Michigan and Michigan State University, as well as the University of Virginia women's soccer team, among others.

== Alumni ==
Notable alumni include:

- Dan Gerber, American poet
- Najeeb Halaby, Federal Aviation Administration director, chairman of Pan Am and father of Queen Noor of Jordan
- Willis Hawkins, aeronautical engineer, designed the C-130 Hercules and other Lockheed aircraft
- Ralph Meeker, film actor, best known for his role as Mike Hammer in Kiss Me Deadly
- Walter Netsch, architect, designer of the United States Air Force Academy chapel
- Jay Nordlinger, conservative columnist, managing editor of National Review magazine
- Lane Smith, film and television actor, played Perry White on the television series Lois and Clark
- Ramón Rodríguez, film and television actor, starred as the title character in the ABC series Will Trent

== Literature ==
- Connie Benac, ed. Leelanau – the First Fifty Years. Recorded by Those Who Were There 1929-1979, The Village Press, Traverse City 1979.
- Michael Huey, Straight as the Pine, Sturdy as the Oak. Skipper & Cora Beals and Major & Helen Huey in the Early Years of Camp Leelanau for Boys, the Leelanau Schools, and the Homestead in Glen Arbor. Volume One: 1921-1963, Schlebrügge, Vienna 2013.
