= WJCU =

Radio station at John Carroll University in University Heights, Ohio

- University Heights, Ohio; United States
- Broadcast area: Greater Cleveland
- Frequency: 88.7 MHz
- Branding: WJCU 88.7 FM

Programming
- Format: College/eclectic

Ownership
- Owner: John Carroll University

History
- First air date: May 13, 1969
- Former call signs: WABU (1969); WUJC (1969–82); WUJC-FM (1982); WUJC (1982–98)
- Former frequencies: 88.9 MHz (1969–77)
- Call sign meaning: John Carroll University

Technical information
- Licensing authority: FCC
- Facility ID: 31478
- Class: A
- ERP: 2,500 watts
- HAAT: 104 meters (341 ft)
- Transmitter coordinates: 41°29′24.00″N 81°31′54.00″W

Links
- Public license information: Public file; LMS
- Webcast: Listen live
- Website: www.wjcu.org

WJCU (88.7 FM) – branded WJCU 88.7 FM – is a non-commercial educational college/eclectic radio station licensed to University Heights, Ohio, serving Greater Cleveland. The station is owned by John Carroll University, which operates it under the direction of the Tim Russert Department of Communication. The WJCU studios are located at the D.J. Lombardo Student Center on the campus of John Carroll, while the station transmitter resides atop Grasselli Tower.

== History ==
WJCU began as WABU on May 13, 1969 via a 10 watt signal at 88.9 MHz. That same year, the station adopted the callsign WUJC. In 1977, the station began broadcasting at 88.7 MHz. For less than one day, on September 24, 1982, the station carried the callsign WUJC-FM; that same day, the station re-adopted the WUJC callsign. On January 12, 1998, the station adopted the callsign WJCU. In the spring of 2006 the power was increased to 1,000 watts and by summer was up to its current output of 2,500 watts.

On February 5 and 6, 2022, a radio interview at WJCU set a Guinness world record for "longest consecutive radio interview" at 25 hours and 35 minutes.

== Current programming ==
WJCU features a weekday daytime format with eclectic and diversified block programming each evening and weekend. While many of the shows feature music, there are also a number of talk/spoken word programs, most of which are locally produced by community broadcasters. Sundays are the special province of ethnic/community shows with locally produced tastes of Jewish, Lithuanian, Italian, Hungarian, Armenian, Chinese, and Latina culture.

Students dominate the Heights, a weekday 6 am - 6 pm format mix of adult alternative music, with a little world & local news and community affairs in the mix. The station also carries some JCU Blue Streak varsity football and basketball broadcasts, with more extensive sports coverage provided on the WJCU Two web-only special event stream.

While some of the block-programmed weekly specialty shows are programmed by student show hosts, a number of community broadcasters host weekly shows, many of which have been long-running and have a considerable audience including the doc's The Mixing Bored. Also, among these broadcasters is Bill Peters, whose show Metal on Metal has supported the Cleveland heavy metal scene along with WJCU and Cleveland college radio with regular benefit concerts since its first weekly broadcast in 1982. Metal on Metal preceded the Mixing Bored for 5 years in the early-mid 1980's and has been on before the current Mixing Bored since January 2013.

The station has a number of long-running programs. Retro Radio is a tribute to Cleveland's legendary Top 40 station "WIXY-1260", and author and poet George Bilgere hosts Wordplay, an aptly named take on the spoken word. Most of the specialty programming at the station can reach national and international audiences via the station's multi-format web streams. WJCU is also home to the nationally distributed talk show The Outspoken Cyclist. In addition, the station is the official home of John Carroll University football, basketball, and baseball.

Well known past programs include Kick Out the Jams, Music to Break Things By, Left of Center, -/syntax radio transmission, Lo-Fi, The Butters, and Atmospheres.
