= Edward Weismiller =

American poet

- Born: August 3, 1915; Monticello, Wisconsin
- Died: August 10, 2010 (aged 95); Washington, D.C.
- Education: Cornell College (BA); Harvard University (MA); Oxford University (DPhil)
- Occupation: Poet
- Spouse: Frances Merewether Power (1941–1963)
- Children: 5

Edward Ronald Weismiller (August 3, 1915 – August 25, 2010) was an American poet, scholar, and professor of English at George Washington University.

== Life ==
Weismiller was born in Monticello, Wisconsin to Jacob Weismiller (of German-Swiss stock) and Georgia Wilson (of Scottish descent). Weismiller's mother died when he was 11, leading to him being taken in by his older sister Luverne two years later. Weismiller developed an interest in writing songs and poetry in high school; guided by his brother-in-law, paper chemist Westbrook Steele, Weismiller won a scholarship to Cornell College, where he began publishing his poetry. In 1936, the twenty-year-old Weismiller became the youngest poet to win the prestigious Yale Series of Younger Poets prize when his first book of poems, The Deer Come Down, was selected for publication by series editor Stephen Vincent Benet. Weismiller graduated from Cornell College in 1938.

Also in 1936, Weismiller was awarded a Rhodes Scholarship to Oxford University, though this was interrupted upon the onset of World War II. In 1941, Random House hired Weismiller, then a 26-year-old student, to translate the first award-winning novel of Franco-Khmer poet Makhali-Phal into English. La favorite de dix ans was subsequently published in New York in 1942 as The Young Concubine.

Following Weismiller's repatriation from Oxford, he earned his master's degree at Harvard University in 1942 and subsequently taught at the university. He also met and married Frances Merewether Power of Redlands, California, a budding poet and journalist; their first child was born in 1942. Around this time, he began his second book of poems, The Faultless Shore, published after the war in 1946.

When the U.S. joined the war in Europe, Weismiller was recruited for counterespionage by the new Office of Strategic Services. He chose to earn his required commission by joining the Marine Corps. On detached service in Europe, he was trained by the British secret services MI5 and MI6. Deployed to Cherbourg, France after D-Day, he became the first American officer to run a captured enemy agent back against the Germans. Weismiller was later put in charge of counterespionage in the American Zone of occupied Germany. He was awarded a Bronze Star and the Médaille de la Reconnaissance française.

After the war, Weismiller declined an invitation to join the successor to the OSS, the newly-formed CIA; instead, he returned to his family in southern California and commenced work on his novel, The Serpent Sleeping, sustained by a Guggenheim writing fellowship. In 1948, the Rhodes Trust invited back the scholars whose time had been cut short by the war, resulting in Weismiller earning his D.Phil. from Oxford in 1950. He went on to teach poetry, creative writing, and John Milton at Pomona College. Weismiller would go on to have four more children during these years.

As an eminent scholar of Milton's poetry, Weismiller came to Washington, D.C. in 1968 following his divorce to study original source materials in the Folger Library and subsequently stayed on to teach in the English department of George Washington University. His third book of poems, The Branch of Fire, was published in 1970, and he was invited to give a reading of his poems at the Library of Congress in 1979. He remained in Washington, D.C. after his retirement in 1980, continuing to write and reap honors. Weismiller contributed to the Princeton Encyclopedia of Poetry, was an editor of the Variorum Milton series (a compendium of the best modern scholarship on Milton), and received the Robert Fitzgerald Prosody Award in 2001 for lifetime contribution to the study of metrics and versification. In 2002, at age 87, his fourth book of poems, Walking Toward the Sun, was published with a foreword by W. S. Merwin (then U.S. poet laureate). Weismiller's work has also appeared in Kenyon Review and The Atlantic.

In 2008, Weismiller began advising a literary team working to produce an updated version of his original translation of The Young Concubine incorporating cultural background material unavailable in 1941.

He lived in Washington, D.C. until his death on August 25, 2010, at 95.

== Awards ==
- 1936 Yale Series of Younger Poets prize
- 1943 Guggenheim Fellowship
- 2001 Robert Fitzgerald Prosody Award
- Rockefeller Foundation grant
- National Endowment for the Humanities grant

== Works ==
- The Deer Come Down, Yale University Press, 1936.
- The Young Concubine, Random House, 1942 (As translator of La favorite de dix ans by Makhali-Phal).
- The Faultless Shore, Houghton Mifflin Co., 1946.
- The Branch of Fire. Word Works. 1980. ISBN 978-0-915380-06-0.
- "Poem", Slate, August 25, 1999.
- "Letter Found Blown Against a Fence", Slate, June 30, 1999.
- Walking Toward the Sun. Yale University Press. 2002. ISBN 978-0-300-09358-2.

=== Novels ===
- The Serpent Sleeping. Taylor & Francis. 1998. ISBN 978-0-7146-4279-6.

=== Anthologies ===
- A. Stanton Coblentz, ed. (2005). "The Deer Come Down; Burial". The Music Makers: An Anthology of Recent American Poetry. Kessinger Publishing. ISBN 978-1-4191-4495-0.
- Poets of World War II, Harvey Shapiro (ed.) "To the Woman in Bond Street Station", ISBN 978-1-931082-33-4.
