= Robert Fitzgerald Prosody Award =

American poetry award

The Robert Fitzgerald Prosody Award is awarded to scholars who have made a lasting contribution to the art and science of versification. The award was named after the poet, critic, and translator Robert Fitzgerald. It was established in 1999 at the Fifth Annual West Chester University Poetry Conference. Each awardee has been interviewed at the conference by linguist and literary historian Dr. Thomas Cable of the University of Texas at Austin.

== Winners ==
- 2014: Brennan O'Donnell
- 2012: Charles O. Hartman
- 2010: Thomas Cable
- 2009: Annie Finch
- 2008: Lewis Turco
- 2007: Robert B. Shaw
- 2006: John Hollander
- 2005: Marina Tarlinskaja
- 2004: Timothy Steele
- 2003: George T. Wright
- 2002: Paul Fussell
- 2001: Edward Weismiller
- 2000: T. V. F. Brogan
- 1999: Derek Attridge

== See also ==
- Poetry
- List of years in poetry
- List of poetry awards
- List of literary awards
