= Morri Creech =

American poet (born 1970)

Morri Creech (born 1970) is an American poet. He earned a BA at Winthrop University and an MA and MFA at McNeese State University. His collection The Sleep of Reason was a finalist for the 2014 Pulitzer Prize for poetry, and his collection Field Knowledge (2006) won the Anthony Hecht Poetry Prize from Waywiser Press. He has received a National Endowment for the Arts fellowship and a Ruth Lilly Fellowship from the Poetry Foundation, and has twice been nominated for a Pushcart Prize. He is the Writer in Residence at Queens University of Charlotte in Charlotte, North Carolina.

In 2025, Creech's poem An Ordinary Childhood won the Rattle Poetry Prize, winning $15,000.

== Bibliography ==
=== Poetry ===
Collections

- Field knowledge. London: The Waywiser Press. 2006.
- The sleep of reason. London: The Waywiser Press. 2013.
- The sentence : poems. Baton Rouge: Louisiana State University Press. 2023.

List of poems

Title	Year	First published	Reprinted/collected
The dead	2023	Creech, Morri (Summer 2023). "The dead". 32 Poems. 41: 10.	
Bedtime metaphysics	2023	Creech, Morri (Summer 2023). "Bedtime metaphysics". 32 Poems. 41: ?.	
The marriage	2025	Creech, Morri (Winter 2025). "The marriage". 32 Poems. 44: 8.	
Wind and sea	2025	Creech, Morri (Winter 2025). "Wind and sea". 32 Poems. 44: 9.	
