= Sir Thomas Smith, 1st Baronet, of Stratford Place =

British surgeon (1833–1909)

Sir Thomas Smith KCVO FRCS
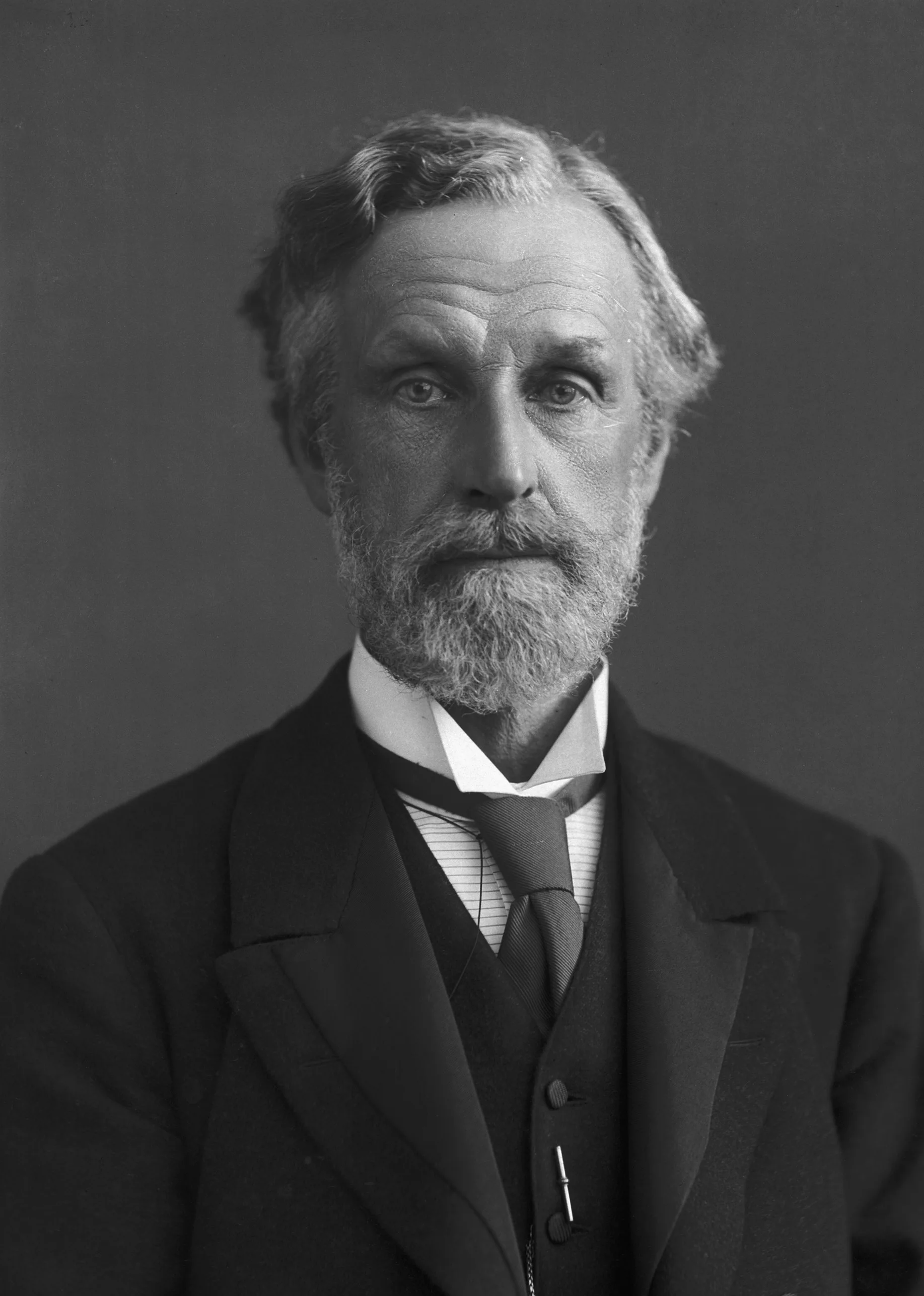
- Smith in 1907
- Born: 23 March 1833; Blackheath, England
- Died: 1 October 1909 (aged 76); London, England
- Education: Tonbridge School
- Occupation: Surgeon
- Spouse: Ann Eliza (m. 1862; died 1879)
- Children: 9

Sir Thomas Smith, 1st Baronet, KCVO, FRCS (23 March 1833 – 1 October 1909) was a British surgeon.

== Life ==
Smith was born in Blackheath, the sixth son of Benjamin Smith, a London goldsmith, by his wife Susannah, daughter of Apsley Pellatt. He was educated at Tonbridge School between 1844 and 1850. In 1851 he became an apprentice to Sir James Paget and in August 1854 he became House Surgeon at Great Ormond Street Hospital. He subsequently worked at St Bartholomew's Hospital and from 1858 to 1861 Smith was Assistant Surgeon at the Great Northern Hospital. In September 1861, he was elected Assistant Surgeon at Great Ormond Street. In June 1868 he was appointed Surgeon and in November 1883 he resigned and was made Consulting Surgeon. Smith served on the Council of the Royal College of Surgeons of England from 1880 to 1900, having been elected in 1858, and was vice-president in 1887–1888 and 1890–1891.

He became Surgeon Extraordinary to Queen Victoria in 1895 in succession to Sir William Savory. He was invested as a Knight Commander of the Royal Victorian Order in 1901, having been created a baronet, of Stratford Place in London, in 1897. He served as honorary Serjeant-Surgeon to Edward VII from 1901 until his death in 1909.

He married on 27 August 1862 Ann Eliza, the second daughter of Frederick Parbury, an Australian by birth. She died on 9 February 1879, shortly after the birth of their ninth child. Their eldest son was the surgeon Rudolph Smith.

Thomas Smith died at his home on Oxford Street in London on 1 October 1909.

== Sources ==
- Power, D'Arcy (1912). "Smith, Thomas (1833-1909)" . In Lee, Sidney (ed.). Dictionary of National Biography (2nd supplement). London: Smith, Elder & Co.

Baronetage of the United Kingdom
New creation	Baronet (of Stratford Place); 1897–1909	Succeeded by Rudolph Smith
