= Society of Mutual Autopsy =

The Society of Mutual Autopsy (French: la Société d'autopsie mutuelle)
- Formation: 19 October 1876; 150 years ago
- Dissolved
- Type: Professional association
- Purpose: Anthropology
- Location: Paris, France
- Affiliations: Society of Anthropology of Paris

The Society of Mutual Autopsy (or French: la Société d'autopsie mutuelle) was a society established on 19 October 1876 by members of the Society of Anthropology of Paris in Paris, France, to facilitate the donation of the bodies of its members for anthropological study upon their death.

== History ==
Its purpose was to facilitate research on any links between personality, ability and brain morphology by creating a system whereby members' bodies, upon death, would be donated to the organization for study.

Its primary tool to organize these donations was a sort of living will which accomplished two main tasks. The first was to make clear the intention of the donor to have his or her body delivered to the organization upon death. The second was to present to the organization a description of the donor: the donor's personality, skills, habits, faults, etc. to allow for more complete research by the organization on the connection between these and brain morphology.

Though little-known outside of anthropological circles until recently, it has been the subject of some academic study, and is featured in the 2003 book The End of the Soul – Scientific Modernity, Atheism, and Anthropology in France, 1876–1936 by historian Jennifer Michael Hecht.
