= Maria Luisa Spaziani =

Italian poet (1923–2014)

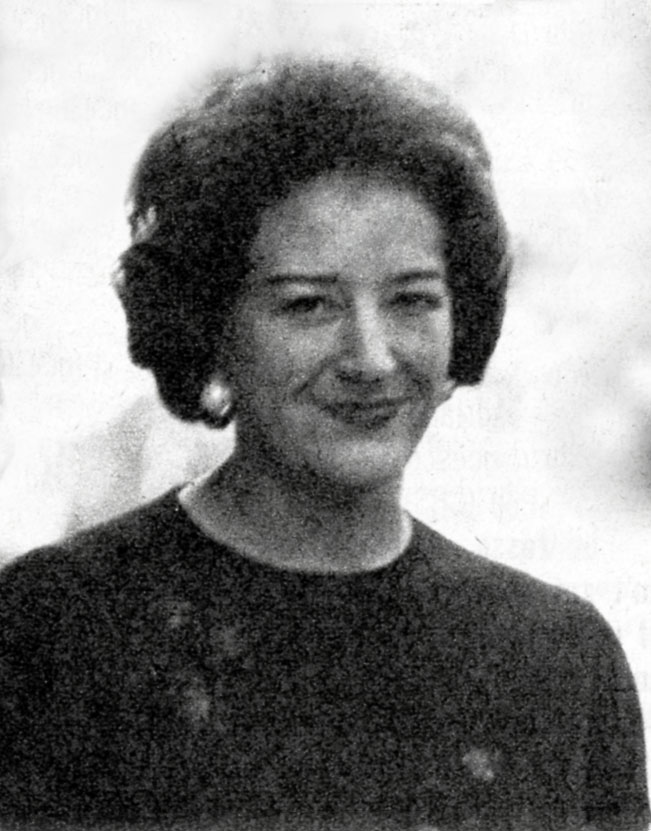
- Spaziani in 1976
- Born: 21 June 1923 Turin, Italy
- Died: 30 June 2014 (aged 91) Rome, Italy
- Occupation: Poetress, theater writer, translator

Maria Luisa Spaziani (7 December 1922 – 30 June 2014) was an Italian poet.

== Biography ==
Spaziani was born in Turin. At nineteen, she founded the review Il dado, working with collaborators such as Vasco Pratolini, Sandro Penna and Vincenzo Ciaffi. Virginia Woolf sent her a chapter of her novel The Waves, autographed to Alla piccola direttrice (To the young editor). Spaziani did not contribute her own poems, however, feeling that they were not of sufficient quality.

In the 1950s Spaziani became involved with the poet Eugenio Montale (1896–1981). Montale encouraged Spaziani to write poetry and was a significant influence in her early style. Maria Luisa Spaziani's first book of poetry, Le acque del sabato, appeared in 1954. Montale drew upon his affair with her in creating the character of la Volpe ("the Fox") in his work La bufera e altro (1956). Montale's poem "Da un lago svizzero" is an acrostic forming her name, Maria Luisa Spaziani. (Spaziani eventually published her correspondence with Montale, some eight hundred letters, in 1995.)

After travelling extensively in the late 1950s and early 1960s, in countries including the United Kingdom, Belgium, Greece, France, and the Soviet Union, Spaziani chose to settle in Rome. Starting from 1964 she taught French language and literature at the University of Messina. She published extensively, as a poet, translator, and scholar.

Spaziani was nominated thrice for the Nobel Prize for Literature; 1990, 1992 and 1997. Her poetry combines a vivid and immediate sense of the natural world with a rich appreciation of literary culture and tradition. Though echoes of past poets appear in her work, Spaziani's voice is clearly her own, sensitive and controlled.

Spaziani was the president of the Centro Internazionale Eugenio Montale, which confers the Premio Montale, a literary prize for translations and publications of Italian verse.

Spaziani died on 30 June 2014 at the age of 91.

== List of works ==
Each year links to its corresponding "[year] in poetry" article:

- 1954: Le acque del sabato
- 1959: Luna lombarda
- 1962: Il gong
- 1966: Utilità della memoria
- 1970: L’occhio del ciclone
- 1976: Ultrasuoni
- 1977: Transito con catene
- 1981: Geometria del disordine
- 1986: La stella del libero arbitrio
- 1990: Giovanna d'Arco
- 1992: Torri di vedata
- 1996: I fasti dell’ortica
- 1998: La traversata dell'oasi
- 1999: La radice del mare
- 1999: Un fresco castagneto
- 2000: La freccia
- 2002: Poesie dalla mano sinistra

== Sources ==
- Star of Free Will, Maria Luisa Spaziani 1986
- Italian women writers: a bio-bibliographical sourcebook By Rinaldina Russell, page 395
