= Marina Tarlinskaja =

American linguist

Marina Tarlinskaja (sometimes transliterated "Tarlinskaya" or "Tarlinskaia", Russian: Марина Тарлинская) is a Russian-born American linguist specializing in the statistical analysis of verse.

She uses the Russian linguistic-statistical method which, at the most basic level, counts the occurrences of word-stresses in ictic (strong) and non-ictic (weak) positions in lines of verse. From these, "stress profiles" can be built, by which bodies of verse of different periods, authors, genres, and even languages can be compared statistically. In her 2014 book she used twelve parameters of verse analyses including syntactic structure of lines and the use of verse rhythm to emphasize meaning. Tarlinskaja successfully applied her methodology to defining the authorship of questionable Elizabethan poems and plays. Writing in 1981, T.V.F. Brogan called her English Verse: Theory and History "the most extensive and most important study of English verse structure produced in this century." In 2005 she received the Robert Fitzgerald Prosody Award. In The Times Literary Supplement Sir Brian Vickers called her Shakespeare and the Versification of English Drama, 1561-1642 (2014) "the book of the year".

Tarlinskaja was born in Moscow and studied at the Foreign Language Institute, Moscow, receiving degrees of Candidate of Sciences in 1967 and Doctor of Sciences in 1976, and teaching there from 1969 to 1981.

She emigrated to the United States in 1981, smuggling out a draft of her subsequent work Shakespeare's Verse with the help of her husband, L.K. Coachman. She currently is research professor emerita in the University of Washington's linguistics department.

== Major works ==
- Tarlinskaja, Marina (1976), English Verse: Theory and History, The Hague: Mouton, ISBN 90-279-3295-6
- Tarlinskaja, Marina (1987), Shakespeare's Verse: Iambic Pentameter and the Poet's Idiocyncrasies, New York: Peter Lang, ISBN 0-8204-0344-X
- Tarlinskaja, Marina (1993), Strict Stress-Meter in English Poetry Compared with German & Russian, Calgary: University of Calgary Press, ISBN 1-895176-17-4
- Tarlinskaja, Marina (2014), Shakespeare and the Versification of English Drama, 1561-1642, Ashgate Pub Co, ISBN 978-1472430281

as co-translator

- Gasparov, M.L. (1996), A History of European Versification, Oxford: Clarendon Press, ISBN 0-19-815879-3
