= John Haines =

American poet (1924–2011)

John Meade Haines (June 29, 1924 – March 2, 2011) was an American poet and educator who had served as the poet laureate of Alaska. Published in 2024, the book May the Owl Call Again, A Return to Poet John Meade Haines, 1924-2011 focuses on the last 2 years of the poet’s life. With 32 poems, 5 essays, and 2 Letters to the Editor, it is an intimate correspondence of words, writings, and letters with reflections on life, death, and friendship.

== Early life ==
John Mead Haines was born in Norfolk, Virginia. He was the son of a career Navy officer and moved from state to state, living in California, Hawaii, Washington, and New England. He later moved to Washington, D.C where he attended St. John's College High School. He served in the Navy as Sonar Man Third Class from 1943 to 1946. Haines was sent to San Diego Naval Training Station. Once his training was finished, he was sent to San Pedro to crew a Battleship for a few months and later sent to Norfolk, Virginia. In Norfolk, he was a part of a small vessel crew until he was reassigned to Boston, Massachusetts. In Boston, he was assigned to the USS Knapp (DD-653) Destroyer. Haines was a part of the Marshall Island invasion, the bombardment of Kwajalein, the battle of Truk, and assaults on Marinas, Saipan and Tinian, and The Philippines. Once the war was over, he went back to Coronado, California. He went to Washington shortly after.

He was educated at the National Art School from 1946 to 1947. In 1947, Haines bought a 160-acre homestead claim 80 miles outside of Fairbanks, Alaska. Haines was unable to paint because of his paint freezing from the cold weather of Alaska and started writing that first winter while he was on the Richardson Homestead. In 1948 he left Alaska because he wanted to go back to school. He attended American University from 1948 to 1950. At the American University he studied painting and sculpture while he was working as a Draftsman at the Navy Department. From 1950 to 1952 he studied at Hans Hofmann's School of Fine Arts in New York before moving to Alaska where he homesteaded from 1954 to 1969. Haines moved to San Diego in 1969, and lived in the lower 48 states for several years before returning to Alaska. He died in Fairbanks, Alaska. Tributes to John Haines by the author and literary critic John A. Murray were published in The Bloomsbury Review, July–August 2011 and The Sewanee Review, Winter 2012.

== Career ==
Haines published nine collections of poetry and numerous works of nonfiction, including his acclaimed Alaskan book The Stars, the Snow, the Fire: Twenty-Five Years in the Alaska Wilderness. Haines was twice the recipient of a Guggenheim Fellowship. He was appointed the Poet Laureate of Alaska in 1969. A collection of critical essays about his poetry, The Wilderness of Vision, was published in 1998. Haines taught graduate-level and honors English classes at the University of Alaska Fairbanks. John A. Murray also conducted a lengthy interview with John Haines in The Bloomsbury Review, July–August 2004. There are discussions of John Haines in Murray's book Abbey in America: A Philosopher's Legacy in a New Century (University of New Mexico Press, Jun 15, 2015) in the essay 'The Age of Abbey' and the Afterword.

Haines believed a good poem illuminates for a moment the context which existed before the poem. He had a distinctive voice, a phrasal rhythm, and writing was intensely personal. Haines used direct speech that was plain, suggestive, and memorable metaphors. Haines talked about the harshness of the climate and the relationship between the hunter and the hunted. Some of Haines’s poetry suggests readers look past the trivial aspects of the physical world and imagine a dreamlike journey. He dissolves temporal boundaries of the natural world, without losing his awareness of the importance of understanding contemporary history, associates Dreamtime with elemental activities such as hunting and traveling over the land, showing the continuity of such experience, and its vitality and importance in affirming longstanding human habits of relating to the natural world. Haines' poetry and prose are about his experiences in Alaska and his experiences enlarge our sense of the “pastness of things” while simultaneously rendering the present in sharp detail.

Haines’ first book, Winter News used the imagery of death, silence, the relationship between the hunter and the hunted that centers around death. His focus was on the Alaska interior and his dreams and visions. He believed in the human spirit that is existential which is concerned with the here and now. Haines' poems that were published in 1966 showcased his thoughts towards an existential spirit. The rhythm and positioning or spacing of lines Haines’ in the 48 poems if Winter News contained no more than 4-stresses. 27 of the poems have a 2-stresses rhythm, fourteen are essentially 3-stress, and seven of the poems are almost evenly divided between two and three stresses per line.

In The Stone Harp, Haines wrote against the background of the Vietnam War. In “Rain Country,” he evokes experiences of thirty years before defined by intimacy with the natural world. The “In the Forest Without Leave,” Haines juxtaposes surreal imagines devastated by future catastrophe to others that suggest the restoration of a simpler and satisfying way of being in the world regulated by natural rhythms.

== Bibliography ==
- Winter-Light (2008). CD; readings from earlier collections of poems and essays, with introductions to each collection. Read by the author.
- For the Century's End: Poems 1990 – 1999 Seattle and London: University of Washington Press
- At the End of This Summer: Poems 1948–1954 (Copper Canyon Press, 1997)
- Fables and Distances: New and Selected Essays (Graywolf Press, 1996)
- The Owl in the Mask of the Dreamer (Graywolf Press, 1993)
- New Poems 1980–88 (1990), (received the Lenore Marshall Poetry Prize and the Western States Book Award)
- The Stars, the Snow, the Fire: Twenty-five Years in the Northern Wilderness (Graywolf Press, 1989)
- News from the Glacier: Selected Poems 1960–1980 (Wesleyan, 1982)
- Living Off the Country: Essays on Poetry and Place (University of Michigan Press, 1981)
- Twenty Poems (Unicorn Press, 1971)
- The Stone Harp (Wesleyan, 1971)
- Winter News (Wesleyan, 1966)

=== Anthologies ===
- A Place on Earth: An Anthology of Nature Writing from Australia and North America. 2004. Edited by Mark Tredinnick.
- The Best American Poetry 1999. Edited by David Lehman.
- A Republic of Rivers: Three Centuries of Nature Writing from Alaska and the Yukon. 1990. Edited by John A. Murray.
- Inroads: An Anthology Celebrating Alaska's Twenty-seven Fellowship Writers. 1988. Edited by Elyse Guttenberg and Jean Anderson.
- Poetry of the Committed Individual. 1973. Edited by Jon Silkin.

== Honors ==
- 2008 Aiken Taylor Award for Modern American Poetry
- 2007 USA Rasmuson Fellow from United States Artists
- 2005 Rasmuson Foundation Distinguished Artist
- University of Alaska Northern Momentum Scholar, 2002
- Fellow, the Academy of American Poets, 1997
- Lifetime Achievement Award from the Alaska Center for the Book/Library of Congress, 1994
- Poets' Prize, 1991
- Alaska Governor's Award for Excellence in the Arts
- two Guggenheim Fellowships
- National Endowment for the Arts Fellowship
- Amy Lowell Traveling Fellowship, 1976–1977
