= Diana Goetsch =

American poet and memoirist

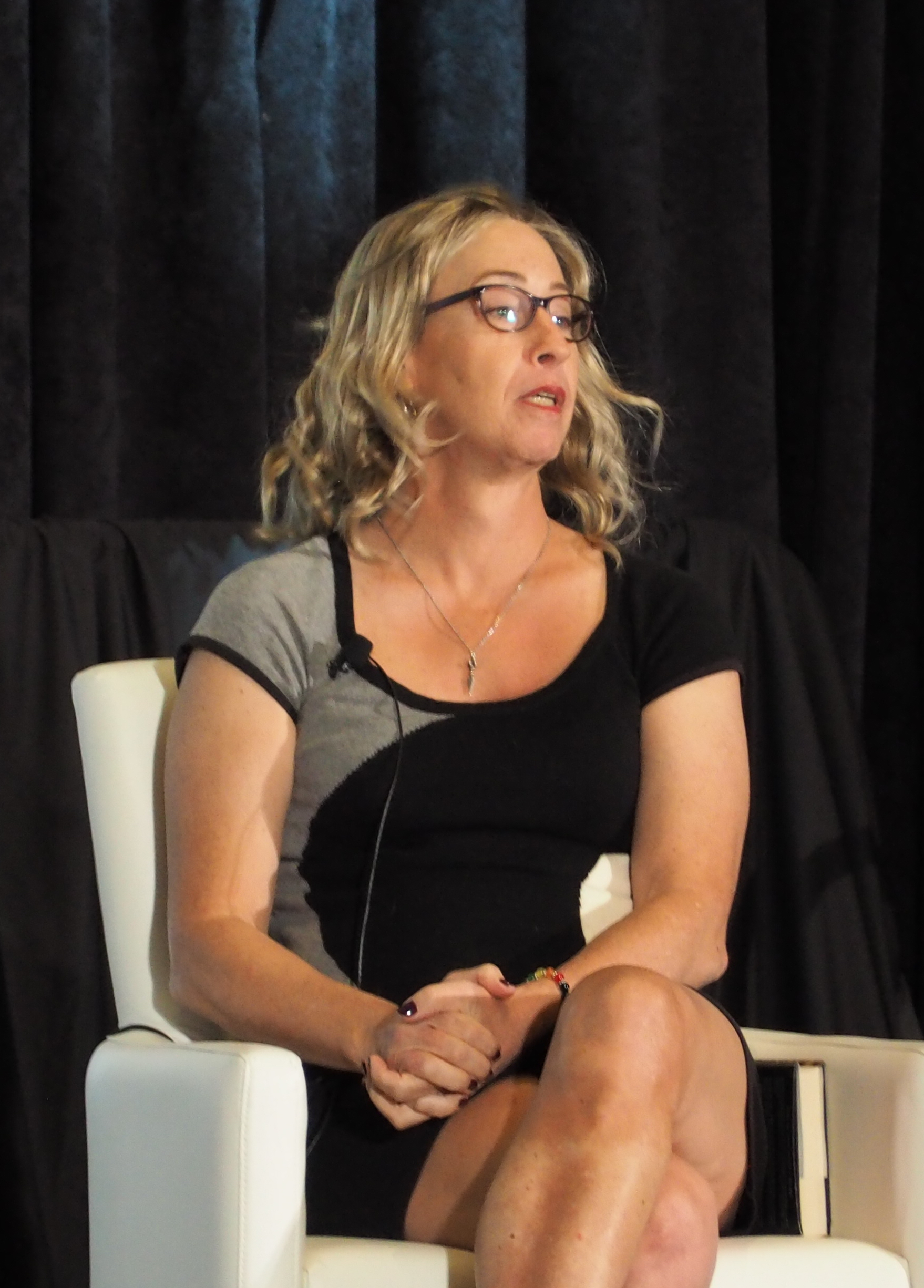
At the 2022 National Book Festival

Diana Goetsch (born 1963) is an American poet and memoirist.

== Life ==
She graduated from Wesleyan University and New York University. She was a New York City public school teacher. She was the 2017 Grace Paley Teaching Fellow at Eugene Lang College of Liberal Arts. She was 2020 Visiting Writer at Vermont College of Fine Arts.

She writes the “Life in Transition” blog at The American Scholar.

Her work appeared in Best American Poetry.

== Works ==
- This Body I Wore, Farrar, Straus and Giroux, 2022. ISBN 978-0374115098
- In America (Rattle, 2017)
- Nameless Boy (Orchises, 2015)
- The Job of Being Everybody (Cleveland State University Press, 2004)
