= Rudolph Smith =

British surgeon

Sir Thomas Rudolph Hampden Smith, 2nd Baronet, CBE, FRCS (24 January 1869 – 25 June 1958) was a British surgeon.

Smith was the son of the eminent surgeon Sir Thomas Smith, 1st Baronet, of Stratford Place, and his wife Ann Eliza (née Parbury). He was educated at Winchester College and Trinity College, Cambridge, and trained as a doctor at St Bartholomew's Hospital in London, beginning his career there as a house surgeon. In 1895 he was elected Fellow of the Royal College of Surgeons (FRCS).

From 1906 to 1913 he practised at Stockton-on-Tees. He succeeded to the baronetcy on his father's death in 1909 and in 1913 moved to Torquay, Devon.

He was appointed Commander of the Order of the British Empire (CBE) in January 1920 for his work in the First World War, during which he headed the Torquay Hospital for Wounded Soldiers.

He married Ann Ellen Sharp in 1897. She died in 1928. They had no children, and on his death in 1958 the baronetcy passed to his nephew, Thomas Smith, of New Zealand, son of his younger brother and fellow surgeon Gilbert.

== Footnotes ==
Baronetage of the United Kingdom
Preceded by Thomas Smith	Baronet (of Stratford Place); 1909–1958	Succeeded by Thomas Turner Smith
