= Dan Gerber =

American writer (born 1940)

Dan Gerber (born 1940 in western Michigan, United States) is an American poet.

== Life and work ==
Dan Gerber Jr. is the son of Daniel Frank Gerber, founder of the Gerber Products Company. At age 26 he was made a Director on the Board of the company, and resigned when he turned 31.

Gerber attended the Leelanau School (class of 1958) and then received a Bachelor of Arts degree in English from Michigan State University in 1962. He was the co-founder, with Jim Harrison, of the literary magazine Sumac. As part of his journalist profession, Gerber made extensive travels, primarily to Africa. He has served as writer-in-residence at Michigan State University and Grand Valley State University. Gerber currently lives in Santa Ynez Valley, California with his wife and son.

Gerber's literary works have been recognized and highlighted at Michigan State University in their Michigan Writers Series. His work has appeared in Narrative Magazine' Poetry, The New Yorker, The Massachusetts Review, The Nation, New Letters, and Best American Poetry'.

His most recent book of poetry, Particles: New and Selected Poems, was published in 2017 by Copper Canyon Press.

== Awards and honors ==
- Michigan Author Award (1992)
- Poem My Father's Fields included in The Best American Poetry 1999
- Trying to Catch the Horses received the Gold Award in the 2000 Book of the Year Awards by ForeWord magazine.
- Mark Twain Award for distinguished contributions to Midwestern literature (2001)

A Primer on Parallel Lives received a Michigan Notable Book Award from The Library of Michigan in 2008.

Sailing through Cassiopeia published by Copper Canyon Press won The Society of Midland Authors Award for poetry in 2013

Work selected for Best American Poetry 1999

== Works ==
- "The Rain Poured Down"; "Doing Nothing"; "Christmas Eve 1944"; "A Star at Dawn, a Bubble in a Stream", Birthdays of Poets

=== Poetry ===
- Particles: New and Selected Poems (Copper Canyon Press, 2017)
- Sailing through Cassiopeia (Copper Canyon Press, 2012)
- A Primer on Parallel Lives (Copper Canyon Press, 2007)
- Trying to Catch the Horses (1999)
- A Last Bridge Home: New and Selected Poems (1992)
- Snow on the Backs of Animals (1986)
- The Chinese Poems (1978)
- Departure (1973)
- The Revenant (1971)

=== Novels ===
- A Voice from the River (1990)
- Out of Control (1974)
- American Atlas (1973)

=== Short stories ===
- Grass Fires (1987)

=== Nonfiction ===
- A Second Life: A Collected Nonfiction (2001)
- Indy: The World’s Fastest Carnival Ride (1977)
