= Doubt: A History =

Book by Jennifer Michael Hecht

- Author: Jennifer Michael Hecht
- Language: English
- Subject: History, Epistemology, History of Religion
- Genre: Nonfiction
- Publisher: HarperCollins
- Publication date: 2003
- Publication place: United States
- Media type: Hardcover, paperback
- ISBN: 978-0060097950

Doubt: A History: The Great Doubters and Their Legacy of Innovation from Socrates and Jesus to Thomas Jefferson and Emily Dickinson is a book by Jennifer Michael Hecht that appeared in 2003.

The title may appear misleading, as Hecht concentrates mainly (though not exclusively) on the history of religious doubt. In a podcast interview Hecht says it was the publishers who didn't want it to be called 'A History of Atheism'. "I set out to write 'A History of Atheism' ... and for a large part that's what I did".

The work provides a detailed history of religious doubt in both the West and the East, reaching back to the earliest recorded evidence of disbelief, the materialist, atheist philosophy of the Carvaka, which flourished in India ca. 600 BCE. Her study leads up to examples from the beginning of the 21st century.
