= Derek Attridge =

British academic (born 1945)

Derek Attridge FBA (born 6 May 1945) is a South African-born British literary scholar in the field of English literature. He has made major contributions to several fields: literary theory, the forms and history of poetry, Irish fiction (especially the work of James Joyce), and South African literature. His best-known book, The Singularity of Literature (2004), won the European Society for the Study of English Book Award in 2006. It has been described as "a brilliant and engaging reflection on how to think literature in terms of the singularity of its event" and as "a deeply important book [that] offers perspectives that can help to radically reconfigure our understanding of language and literature and much else." In 2017 it was reissued in the Routledge Classics series.

Attridge is Emeritus Professor of English and Related Literature at the University of York, having retired from the university in 2016, and is a Fellow of the British Academy. He is the author or editor of thirty books, and has published around eighty articles in essay collections and a similar number in journals. He has held a Guggenheim Fellowship and a Leverhulme Research Professorship, and Fellowships at the National Humanities Center, the Bogliasco Foundation, the Camargo Foundation, the Stellenbosch Institute for Advanced Study, the Freiburg Institute for Advanced Studies, and All Souls and St. Catherine's Colleges, Oxford. Among the visiting positions he has held have been professorships at the American University of Cairo, the University of Sassari, the University of Cape Town, Northwestern University, Wellesley College, and the University of Queensland. He was the first recipient of the Robert Fitzgerald Prosody Award in 1999.

== Career ==
Attridge attended Scottsville Government School and Maritzburg College in Pietermaritzburg, Natal, South Africa, and received his Bachelor of Arts (BA) from Natal University in South Africa before moving to the UK in 1966 to complete his Master of Arts (MA) and PhD at Clare College, Cambridge. He held a Research Lectureship at Christ Church, Oxford, from 1971 to 1973, and then a Lectureship and Senior Lectureship at the University of Southampton. In 1984 he was appointed Professor in the Department of English Studies at the University of Strathclyde, Glasgow, and in 1988 moved to the USA, where he joined the English Department at Rutgers University. In 1998 he took up a Leverhulme Research Professorship at the University of York, U.K., where he became Professor in 2003.

In 2015, a three-day conference to mark Attridge's 70th birthday was held at the University of York. Academics from several countries gave talks, and there were readings from leading poets (Don Paterson, Paul Muldoon, John Wilkinson) and novelists (Tom McCarthy, Emma Donoghue, Zoë Wicomb).

== Major books ==
Well-weighed Syllables: Elizabethan Verse in Classical Metres (Cambridge University Press, 1974). Based on Attridge's PhD thesis, this remains the standard study of the attempts to write English poetry in the meters of Latin verse.

The Rhythms of English Poetry (Longman, 1982). A comprehensive account of the use of rhythm and meter in English poetry that pioneered an approach challenging the traditional use of Greek and Roman terminology and now frequently adopted in poetic studies. One review called it "a stimulating introduction to a promising new scansional system that overcomes many of the ubiquitous difficulties of traditional notations." It was followed by Poetic Rhythm: An Introduction (Cambridge University Press, 1995, "lucid and entertaining"), Meter and Meaning: An Introduction to Rhythm and Poetry (with Thomas Carper; Routledge, 2003), and Moving Words: Forms of English Poetry (Oxford University Press, 2013), a book that "should be read by all aspiring poets".

Peculiar Language: Literature as Difference from the Renaissance to James Joyce. (Cornell University Press and Methuen, 1988; reissued, Routledge, 2004). This book traces attempts to capture the distinctiveness of literary language across three centuries. One reviewer commented, "Attridge shows in this book (as in his earlier Rhythms of English Poetry) a very impressive clarity and fluency of exposition: as an elucidator of tropes he has few equals."

Joyce Effects: On Language, Theory, and History (Cambridge University Press, 2000). "Derek Attridge's Joyce Effects: On Language, Theory, and History, gives us Joyce criticism at its self-reflexive best"; "the book stands as a paradigm for future critico-theoretical writing—for scholarship that delights as well as instructs."

J. M. Coetzee and the Ethics of Reading: Literature in the Event (University of Chicago Press and KwaZulu-Natal University Press, 2004). A study of Coetzee's works up to and including Elizabeth Costello. "The definitive critical work on this most haunting of contemporary novelists." Further publications on South African literature include The Cambridge History of South African Literature (2012), edited with David Attwell.

The Singularity of Literature (Routledge, 2004, 2017). "Rarely does one encounter a book of criticism of such ambitious scope and content executed so invitingly that what is at stake in its reading is nothing short of a mandate to rethink our notions of literary production, our sense of responsible reading practices and the fundamental importance of the literary itself." Supplemented by The Work of Literature (Oxford University Press, 2015). Attridge's central argument is summarized as follows: "To read a work of literature responsibly is to open oneself to being transformed by that work and there are no guarantees that the transformation will be a desirable one; if there were guarantees, then the work could not be truly transformative in the first place, which is precisely why the institution of literature requires perceptive, responsible, and sincere critics and theorists – like Attridge himself." Translated into Spanish, Polish, and Chinese.

The Experience of Poetry: From Homer’s Listeners to Shakespeare’s Readers (Oxford University Press, 2019). " A spectacularly rich and vast storehouse of poetic history, both convincingly homogeneous as a longue durée and absorbing in its smaller diverse details."

Forms of Modernist Fiction: Reading the Novel from James Joyce to Tom McCarthy Edinburgh: Edinburgh University Press, 2023. A Choice Outstanding Academic Title 2024. "This important new work by Attridge is as ambitious in depth as it is impressive in breadth. [...] For students of modernism in general and Joycean scholars in particular, this book is indispensable."

== Other books ==
- Post-structuralist Joyce (co-edited with Daniel Ferrer), Cambridge University Press, 1984
- The Linguistics of Writing: Arguments between Language and Literature (co-edited with Nigel Fabb, Alan Durant, and Colin MacCabe), Manchester University Press and Routledge, 1987
- Post-structuralism and the Question of History (co-edited with Geoff Bennington and Robert Young), Cambridge University Press, 1987
- The Cambridge Companion to James Joyce (edited), Cambridge University Press 1990; second, revised edition, 2004
- Acts of Literature, by Jacques Derrida (edited), Routledge, 1992
- Writing South Africa: Literature, Apartheid, and Democracy 1970–1995 (co-edited with Rosemary Jolly), Cambridge University Press, 1998
- Semicolonial Joyce (co-edited with Marjorie Howes), Cambridge University Press, 2000
- Ulysses: A Casebook (edited), Oxford University Press, 2004
- How to Read Joyce, Granta Books, 2007
- Reading and Responsibility: Deconstruction’s Traces, Edinburgh University Press, 2010
- Theory after 'Theory' (co-edited with Jane Elliott), Routledge, 2011
- Derek Attridge in Conversation (with David Jonathan Bayot and Francisco Roman Guevara), Sussex Academic Press and De La Salle University Press, 2015
- The Craft of Poetry: Dialogues on Minimal Interpretation (with Henry Staten), Routledge, 2015
- Zoë Wicomb and the Translocal: Writing Scotland and South Africa (co-edited with Kai Easton), Routledge, 2017
- The Work of Reading: Literary Criticism in the 21st Century (co-edited with Anirudh Sridhar and Mir Ali Husseini), Palgrave, 2021
- Literature and Event: Twenty-First Century Reformulations (co-edited with Mantra Mukim), Routledge, 2021
- In a Province: Studies in the Writing of South Africa by Graham Pechey (co-edited with Laura Pechey), Liverpool University Press, 2022
