= Marcia Southwick =

American poet and teacher

Marcia Ann Southwick (born October 30, 1949) is an American poet and University instructor of Creative writing who has received numerous awards and honors for her poetry and teaching.

== Biography ==
Marcia Southwick was born on October 30, 1949, in Boston, Massachusetts, daughter of Wayne Orin (father) and Jessie Ann Southwick (mother). After graduating from the University of Iowa Writers' Workshop with an M.F.A. in 1975, Southwick married the poet Larry Levis on March 15, 1975, with fellow poet David St. John serving as best man.

Eventually, Levis and Southwick lived in Columbia, Missouri, where they both taught at the University of Missouri, and together were founding editors of The Missouri Review. The couple had a child, Nicholas Southwick Levis, who was born in 1978. In 1981, they moved back to Iowa where they both taught in the M.F.A program as visiting poets for two years. The couple divorced in the early 1980s.

Southwick later moved to Lincoln, Nebraska, where she taught at the University of Nebraska–Lincoln. In 1992, she met and married Murray Gell-Mann, the Nobel Prize-winning physicist, and moved to Santa Fe, New Mexico. Southwick would go on to teach for many years as a Visiting Poet at the University of New Mexico. Her son Nicholas would become Gell-Mann's stepson.

Southwick's volumes of poetry include A Saturday Night at the Flying Dog which won the Field Prize from Oberlin College Press.

== Selected bibliography ==
Poetry books

- The Night Won't Save Anyone. (Athens: University of Georgia Press, 1980)
- Connecticut: Eight Poems. (Pym-Randall Press, 1981)
- Her Six Difficulties and His Small Mistakes. (Labyrinth Press, 1988)
- Why the River Disappears. (Pittsburgh: Carnegie-Mellon University Press, 1989) ISBN 9780887480997
- Saturday Night at the Flying Dog. (Oberlin College Press, 1999) ISBN 9780932440853

Editor

- Extended Outlooks: The Iowa Review Collection of Contemporary Women Writers. Edited with Jane Cooper, Gwen Head, and Adalaide Morris. New York: Macmillan, 1982.

== Awards and honors ==
- John H. Ames Reading Series, Featured Reader, 23 October 1986 and 16 January 1992
- Visiting Lectureships at University of Iowa and University of Colorado, Boulder
- Stanley B. Young Fellowship at Bread Loaf Writers' Conference
- National Endowment of the Arts (NEA) grant
- Virginia Faulker Award for Excellence in Writing
- Field Poetry Prize in 1998
- Pushcart Prize (twice)
- Robert Bly selects Southwick's poem "A Star Is Born in the Eagle Nebula" for inclusion in The Best American Poetry 1999
