= Joan McBreen =

Irish poet

- Born: 1944 (age 81–82)

Joan McBreen (born 1944), is an Irish poet. Her work has been translated into many languages and appears in a number of anthologies.

== Biography ==
Joan McBreen was born in 1944. She qualified as a primary school teacher, and in 1997 was awarded an MA from University College, Dublin.

McBreen is involved with a number of literary festivals in Ireland. She has assisted at Yeats International Summer School and has been part of Clifden Arts Week, the Cúirt International Festival of Literature, which is held in Galway, and Listowel Writers’ Week. Since 2007 McBreen has been a Literary Advisor and Co-ordinator of the Oliver St. John Gogarty Literary Festival. She has also traveled to give readings and lectures in Illinois, Massachusetts, Georgia, Kentucky, Nebraska, Iowa, Alabama, Minnesota and Missouri.

McBreen lives in both Tuam and Renvyle, County Galway.

== Bibliography ==
- The Wind Beyond the Wall (Brownsville: Story Line 1990), 52pp.
- A Walled Garden in Moylough (Galway: Salmon 1995)
- Winter in the Eye: New & Selected Poems (Cliffs of Moher: Salmon Poetry 2003)
- Heather Island (Cliffs of Moher: Salmon Press 2009)
- Map and Atlas (Salmon Poetry, 2017)
- The White Ban/An Bhileog Bhán (Galway: Salmon Poetry 2001)
- The Watchful Heart - A New Generation of Irish Poets: Poems & Essays (Moher: Salmonpoetry 2009)

== Discography ==
- The Long Light on the Land: Selected Poems (Castlebar: Ernest Lyons Prods. 2004)
