= Jennifer Michael Hecht =

American historian, teacher and poet (born 1965)

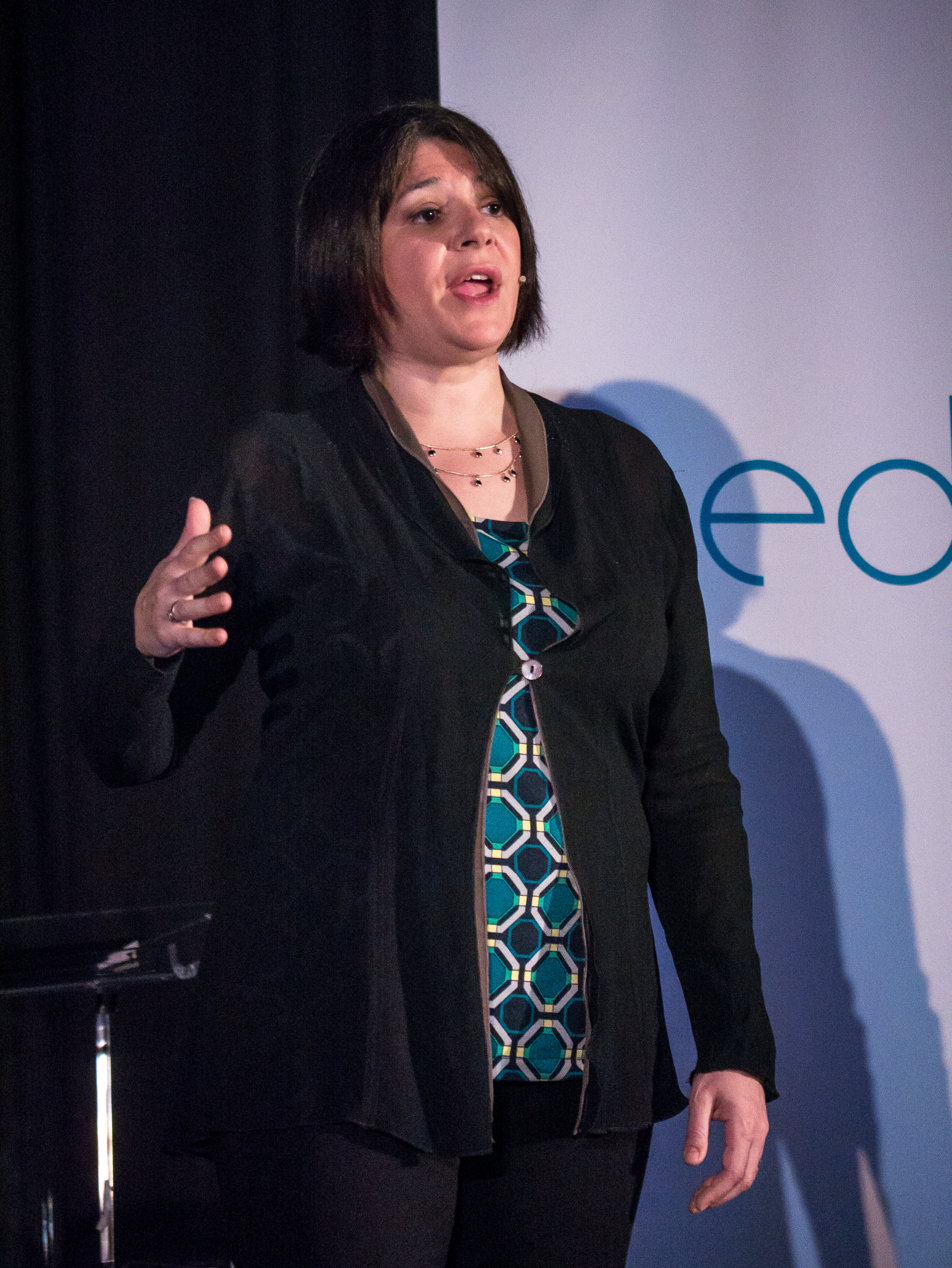
- Hecht in 2015
- Born: November 23, 1965 (age 60); Glen Cove, New York, United States
- Education: Adelphi University (BA); Columbia University (Ph.D.)
- Occupation: College professor
- Spouse: John Chaneski
- Children: 2
- Website: www.jennifermichaelhecht.com

Jennifer Michael Hecht (born November 23, 1965) is a teacher, author, poet, historian, and philosopher. She was an associate professor of history at Nassau Community College (1994–2007) and most recently taught at The New School in New York City.

Hecht has seven published books, her scholarly articles have been published in many journals and magazines, and her poetry has appeared in The New Yorker, The New Republic, Ms. Magazine, and Poetry Magazine, among others. She has also written essays and book reviews for The New York Times, The Washington Post, The Philadelphia Inquirer, The American Scholar, The Boston Globe and other publications. She has written several columns for The New York Times online "Times Select." In 2010 Hecht was one of the five nonfiction judges for the National Book Award.

Hecht is a longtime blogger for The Best American Poetry series web site and maintains a personal blog on her website. She resides in Brooklyn, New York.

== Background ==
Born in Glen Cove, New York on Long Island, Hecht attended Adelphi University, where she earned a BA in history, for a time studying at the Université de Caen, and the Université d'Angers. She earned her PhD in the history of science from Columbia University in 1995 and taught at Nassau Community College from 1994 to 2007, finally as a tenured associate professor of history. Hecht has taught in the MFA programs at The New School and Columbia University, and is a fellow of the New York Institute for the Humanities.

Hecht is married and has two children.

She has appeared on television on the Discovery Channel, The Morning Show with Marcus Smith, Road to Reason and MSNBC's Hardball, and on radio on The Brian Lehrer Show, The Leonard Lopate Show, On Being (formerly known as Speaking of Faith), All Things Considered, The Joy Cardin Show, and others.

== Intellectual interests and writings ==
Of her three major intellectual interests, she ranks them, "Poetry came first, then historical scholarship, then public atheism, and they probably remain in that order in my dedication to them."

Originally intending to be a poet, she was drawn to the history of science. Her first book, The End of the Soul: Scientific Modernity, Atheism, and Anthropology in France, 1876-1936, grew out of her dissertation on some late 19th-century anthropologists who formed the Society of Mutual Autopsy. The members would dissect each other's brains after death, and Hecht, having noticed their atheism, came to understand that this was being done not only for the sake of scientific finds, but perhaps to prove to the Catholic Church that the soul does not exist.

While researching her first book, she came to realize that there was no sufficient history of atheism, and that led to her second book, Doubt: A History.

While writing Doubt, she found that many atheists went beyond simply stating that there are no gods and also made profound suggestions about how people should think of life and how we should live. That led to her third book, The Happiness Myth, which starts there and goes on to look at present-day attitudes about how to be happy. She calls it "a work of Skepticism in the modern sense of debunking."

In 2023, Hecht published The Wonder Paradox: Embracing the Weirdness of Existence and Poetry of Our Lives, combining her interests of poetry and atheism, in which she explores finding meaning to life through poetry, rather than religion.

== Philosophy ==
A culture that invents
escalators and Stairmasters
is a culture that needs to
assess what it's actually
talking about.

— Jennifer Michael Hecht
from an
interview by D.J. Grothe
on Point of Inquiry podcast

Hecht believes that, "the basic modern assumptions about how to be happy are nonsense." In a review of her book, The Happiness Myth for The New York Times, Alison McCulloch summed it up, "What you think you should do to be happy, like getting fitter and thinner, is part of a 'cultural code' — 'an unscientific web of symbolic cultural fantasies' — and once you realize this, you will perhaps feel a little more free to be a lot more happy." Similarly, in an interview on the Point of Inquiry podcast in 2007, she said "I'm not trying really to get somebody out of depression, but I sure am trying to get people to not be so worried, so anxious over things that really don't matter."

She has written against agnosticism, calling "philosophically silly" the argument that because you can't prove a negative we have to allow for the possibility of God. "Either you doubt everything to the point where you can't speak, or you make reasoned decisions."

Hecht is an anti-suicide advocate, writing an entire book (Stay: A History of Suicide and the Philosophies Against It) arguing against it. She believes not only that "Suicide is delayed homicide", but also "that you owe it to your future self to live". She does not believe in life after death, urging that we should remember death and remember that it's the end. "I think this world is extraordinary and I also think it's a pain in the ass. And I'm happy to be here and I'm ok with not being here forever."

She believes that morality is not magical, it is the attempt to do right. And rather than either being handed to us by God or just made up by each person, is inherent in human groups. "There are deep rules of morality that we as human beings, in human groups, 'invented' on biological and social and intellectual lines."

Her poetry and philosophy often intersect, and she has taught a course called "Poets and Philosophy" at the New School for many years. Her own taste is for poets who are concerned with philosophical or religious questions. "Leopardi's misery makes me as happy as Schopenhauer's does, though I am ever aware of the equal cacophony of birth and pleasure that shadow their admittedly much more deafening symphony of death and suffering. Dickinson I treasure beyond measure and think she's mostly on my side of the nonbeliever line; anyway, she's my number-one poet. Hopkins has a few rhyming hunks of pure passion, frustrated but wild, which I love with a love that is more than a love, but which only go so far. Donne is deep and great company, but he leans too much into comforting delusions for me, often when he is at his best in poetic chops and pyrotechnics. Rilke is a lifesaving self-help writer and a bit of a brilliant con artist."

== Atheism ==
Hecht was raised Jewish and believed in God until she was twelve when she had what she describes as a "Talking Heads headshift", standing in her parents' house saying, "This is not my beautiful couch, I am not your beautiful daughter." In the days that followed she came to see that "we are one species among great nature, and as the trees very slowly rot, so do our pampered haunches." Eventually, she replaced faith in God with faith in humanity.

Hecht has been an outspoken member of the secular community since 2003, accepting the label "atheist" somewhat reluctantly. "Initially after writing my book Doubt, I avoided the atheist label, saying only that I did not believe in God. After some reflection, I realized I needed to defend what I truly believe. I now call myself an 'atheist,' and proudly."

Hecht is an honorary board member of the Freedom From Religion Foundation. In 2009, she told the FFRF convention audience: "If there is no God — and there isn't — then we [humans] made up morality. And I'm very impressed."

In her 2007 interview for the Point of Inquiry podcast, when asked, "Do you think religion might actually be harmful for one's happiness?", she said, "Yes ... when I wrote Doubt it was very much to show people who felt that doubting religion or getting away from religion was painful. I find the world in which the natural world that we see is the world, in which we make up no other, I find that world to be the best one. I'm glad there's no afterlife. I like the world as it is. And I think that religion does add a tremendous amount of guilt and pain and trouble." Hecht does not, however, believe that religion is all bad. In that same interview, she went on to say, "The beautiful building and coming together and reminding oneself of community, of how we must each take the role that is given us, know yourself, remember death, control your desires, these are the big messages of wisdom. And religion got it right that you have to meditate on them for them to work."

In a December 2013 article for Politico Magazine, Hecht examined "The Last Taboo" in American politics, atheism. Referencing newly retired Rep. Barney Frank's lack of religious belief she wrote, "Was it really harder to come out as an atheist politician in 2013 than as a gay one 25 years ago?"

== Published works ==
Her debut poetry collection, The Next Ancient World, artfully mixes contemporary and ancient world views, histories, and myths. In 2002 it received the Tupelo Press Judge's Prize in Poetry, the Norma Farber First Book Award from the Poetry Society of America, as well as ForeWord Magazine's award for Poetry Book of the Year. Her second collection, Funny, explores the implications of the human love of humor and jokes. It won the 2005 Felix Pollak Prize from the University of Wisconsin Press. Her most recent collection, Who Said (Copper Canyon Press, 2013), playfully asks the title question of some of the most iconic English language poems.

In 2003 Hecht published two books of history and philosophy with two different publishers. The first, Doubt: A History, is an epic, worldwide study of religious doubt throughout history. The other, The End of the Soul, is a profile of an unusual group of nineteenth-century French anthropologists who formed the Society of Mutual Autopsy to discover links between personality, ability and brain morphology. It received the prestigious Ralph Waldo Emerson Award for 2004 from Phi Beta Kappa society "for scholarly studies that contribute significantly to interpretations of the intellectual and cultural condition of humanity."

In 2007 Hecht published The Happiness Myth: Why What We Think Is Right Is Wrong in which she attempts to examine happiness through historical perspective. Hecht maintains that our current perception of happiness is affected by culture, and that future generations may well mock our view of happiness as we make fun of earlier generations.

In 2013 Hecht published Stay: A History of Suicide and the Philosophies Against It. It is a study of intellectual and cultural history, in which she channels her grief for two friends lost to suicide into a search for persuasive arguments against it; arguments she hopes to bring back into public consciousness.

In 2023 Hecht published The Wonder Paradox: Embracing the Weirdness of Existence and the Poetry of Our Lives.

== Bibliography ==
=== History and philosophy ===
- 2003 The End of the Soul: Scientific Modernity, Atheism, and Anthropology in France, 1876-1936 — ISBN 0-231-12846-0
- 2003 Doubt, A History: The Great Doubters and Their Legacy of Innovation from Socrates and Jesus to Thomas Jefferson and Emily Dickinson — ISBN 0-06-009772-8
- 2007 The Happiness Myth: The Historical Antidote to What Isn't Working Today — ISBN 0-06-081397-0
- 2013 Stay: A History of Suicide and the Philosophies Against It — ISBN 0-300-18608-8
- 2023 The Wonder Paradox: Embracing the Weirdness of Existence and the Poetry of Our Lives — ISBN 0-374-29274-4

==== Selected journal articles ====
- Hecht, Jennifer Michael (April 2000). "Vacher de Lapouge and the Rise of Nazi Science". Journal of the History of Ideas. 61 (2): 285–304. doi:10.1353/jhi.2000.0018. S2CID 170993471. This article examines Georges Vacher de Lapouge's contribution to the ideology in the Nazi "Final Solution". "Lapouge's contribution to racism was a quantitative, well-written race theory that was replete with the language and tools of science. It was particularly appealing because it described a collection of human groups which sounded too scientific and clinical to be political."
- Hecht, Jennifer Michael (March 1999). "The Solvency of Metaphysics: The Debate over Racial Science and Moral Philosophy in France,1890–1919". Isis. 90 (1): 1–24. doi:10.1086/384239. S2CID 143737005.
- Hecht, Jennifer Michael (Summer 1997). "A vigilant anthropology: Léonce Manouvrier and the disappearing numbers". Journal of the History of the Behavioral Sciences. 33 (3): 221–240. doi:10.1002/(sici)1520-6696(199722)33:3<221::aid-jhbs2>3.0.co;2-u.
- Hecht, Jennifer Michael (December 2013). "Stopping Suicide". The Chronicle of Higher Education.

=== Poetry ===
- 2001 The Next Ancient World — ISBN 0-9710310-0-2
- 2005 Funny — ISBN 0-299-21400-1
- 2013 Who Said (Copper Canyon Press) – ISBN 978-1-55659-449-6

==== Collections ====
- Best American Poetry 2005, Paul Muldoon and David Lehman, eds. (Scribner's, 2005).
- Good Poems for Hard Times, Garrison Keillor, ed. (Viking/Penguin, 2005).
- Poetry Daily, Boller, Selby, and Yost, eds. (Sourcebooks, 2003).
- Good Poems, Garrison Keillor, ed. (Viking/Penguin, 2002).
- Poems to Live by in Uncertain Times, Joan Murray, ed. (Beacon, 2001).
- The Best American Poetry 1999, Robert Bly and David Lehman, eds. (Scribner's, 1999).

== Translations ==
=== Portuguese ===
- Dúvida: uma História (Ediouro, 2005)
- O Mito de Felicidade (Larousse, 2011)

=== Italian ===
- Dubbio: una storia (Ariele, 2010)

=== Korean ===
- "의심의 역사" (Imago, 2011)
- "행복이란 무엇인가" (Gongjon, 2012)

=== Japanese ===
- 自殺の思想史―抗って生きるために (みすず書房, 2022)

=== Spanish ===
- La futura antigüedad (Cielo Eléctrico, 2021)

=== Arabic ===
- (2014, تاريخ الشك" (المركز القومي للترجمة. القاهرة"
