= Destruction Was My Beatrice =

2015 book by Jed Rasula

Destruction Was My Beatrice: Dada and the Unmaking of the Twentieth Century
- Author: Jed Rasula
- Language: English
- Subject: Cultural History
- Genre: History
- Publisher: Basic Books
- Publication date: 2015
- Media type: Hardcover, Kindle
- Pages: 384
- ISBN: 978-0465089963
- Website: Basic Books

Destruction Was My Beatrice: Dada and the Unmaking of the Twentieth Century by Jed Rasula is a narrative history of the Dada movement, its birth in Zürich, Switzerland during World War I, its rapid spread and sudden decline throughout Europe, and the political and cultural legacy it left behind. Jed Rasula is the Helen S. Lanier Distinguished Professor of English at the University of Georgia.

== Reviews ==
- Beals, K. (2016). "Review of the book Destruction Was My Beatrice: Dada and the Unmaking of the Twentieth Century, by Jed Rasula". Modernism/Modernity. 23 (2): 473–475. doi:10.1353/mod.2016.0038. S2CID 148365456.
- Codrescu, Andrei (June 25, 2015). "Review: Destruction Was My Beatrice: Dada and the Unmaking of the Twentieth Century". The New York Times.
- Illingworth, Dustin (2015). "Elasticity itself". The Brooklyn Rail.
- Kluberdanz, Rebecca (May 1, 2015). "Destruction was my Beatrice: Dada and the unmaking of the twentieth century". Library Journal.
- Lee, Nicole (July 10, 2015). "Review: Destruction Was My Beatrice: Dada and the Unmaking of the Twentieth Century". Washington Post.
- Winton, Laura (2015). "Destruction was my Beatrice: Dada and the unmaking of the twentieth century". Rain Taxi.

== Release information ==
- Hardcover: June 2, 2015 (First Edition), Basic Books, 384pp. ISBN 978-0465089963.
