= Thomas R. Smith (poet) =

American poet

- Born: January 16, 1948 (age 78); Chippewa Falls, Wisconsin, US
- Occupation: Poet
- Spouse: Krista Spieler
- Writing career
- Genre: American poetry
- Website: thomasrsmithpoet.com

Thomas R. Smith (born January 16, 1948) is an American poet, essayist, teacher and editor. His work has appeared in numerous anthologies and journals in the U.S. and internationally. His poems have been featured on The Writer's Almanac, a syndicated national public radio program and podcast hosted by Garrison Keillor. His work was also selected for The Best American Poetry 1999, edited by poet Robert Bly, and in former U.S. Poet Laureate Ted Kooser's syndicated newspaper column, American Life in Poetry.

Smith has described his own work as drawing from the nature and landscape of his home in Wisconsin. In a review of Smith's Kinnickinic, fellow poet and critic B.J. Best wrote, "Smith's best poems use natural life to instruct and inspire us, who are all too often removed from the natural landscape." Robert Bly described Smith as "a high-spirited poetry horse riding over the hills of emotion." Poet Ralphe Murre praised Smith's use of earthly language, void of pretense but still playful and inventive: "At no time does he allow some device or conceit to get in the way of the poem, or his readers’ access to it. This is the work of a mature artist, certain of his craft; simply, effectively, and honestly allowing us in."

Smith has fourteen books and chapbooks of his poetry published, and his fifteenth, Windy Day at Kabekona: New and Selected Prose Poems, is due for publication in 2018. He has also edited various books, including three on the subject of fellow poet Robert Bly. His poetry criticism has been published in the St. Paul Pioneer Press, the Minneapolis Star Tribune, Great River Review, Ruminator Review, and in other periodicals.

Smith lives in River Falls, Wisconsin with his wife Krista Spieler. He teaches poetry at the Loft Literary Center in Minneapolis, Minnesota.

== Works ==
=== Poetry collections ===
- Windy Day at Kabekona: New and Selected Prose Poems, 1978–2017 (forthcoming, White Pine Press)
- The Glory (Red Dragonfly Press, 2015)
- The Foot of the Rainbow (Red Dragonfly Press, 2010)
- Waking Before Dawn (Red Dragonfly Press, 2006)
- Winter Hours (Red Dragonfly Press, 2005)
- The Dark Indigo Current (Holy Cow! Press, 2000)
- Horse of Earth (Holy Cow! Press, 1994)
- Keeping the Star (New Rivers Press, 1988)

=== Chapbooks ===
- Dream Union: Poems in Defense of Democracy (Lost Music Press, 2014)
- The Night We Saved the Beatles (Lost Music Press, 2012)
- Wisconsin Spring (Lost Music Press, 2011)
- Kinnickinnic (Parallel Press, 2008)
- Peace Vigil: Poems for an Election Year (and After) (Lost Music Press, 2004)
- North Country (Red Dragonfly Press, 2001)
- The Lost Music (Book Press, 1996)

=== Edited works ===
- Airmail: The Letters of Robert Bly and Tomas Transtršmer (Graywolf Press,2013; in the UK, Bloodaxe Books, 2013)
- Robert Bly in This World (principal editor, with James P. Lenfestey, University of Minnesota Libraries, 2011)
- What Happened When He Went to the Store for Bread: Poems by Alden Nowlan (Nineties Press, 1993)
- Walking Swiftly: Writings and Images on the Occasion of Robert Bly’s 65th Birthday (Ally Press, 1992; paperback edition published by HarperCollins, 1993)

=== Recordings ===
- What Happened When He Went to the Store for Bread: The Astonishing Poems of Alden Nowlan Read by Robert Bly and Thomas R. Smith (Ally Press Audio, 1994)
