= George Bilgere =

American poet

George Bilgere (born 1951) is an American poet.

Bilgere grew up in Riverside, California, and earned his BA at the University of California, Riverside. He received his MA in English Literature from Washington University in St. Louis and earned a Ph.D. in contemporary British and American Poetry from the University of Denver in 1988.

Bilgere has received grants in poetry from the National Endowment for the Arts and from the Ohio Arts Council. In 1991 he was a Fulbright scholar in Bilbao, Spain. In 2002 was named a Witter Bynner Fellow through the Library of Congress by U.S. Poet Laureate Billy Collins. He has won a Pushcart Prize, and in 2014 was awarded a $20,000 Creative Workforce Fellowship from Cleveland's Community Partnership for Arts and Culture (CPAC). Billy Collins has called Bilgere's work "a welcome breath of fresh, American air in the house of contemporary poetry."

Bilgere has given poetry readings at the Library of Congress, the 92nd Street Y in New York, and at universities and arts centers around the country.

He lives in Cleveland, Ohio, and teaches at John Carroll University. He also hosts "Wordplay", a spoken-word radio program on WJCU that has been called "the Car Talk of poetry."

== Works ==
- The Going, poetry (Columbia: University of Missouri Press, 1994)
- Big Bang, poetry (Providence: Copper Beach Press, 1999)
- The Good Kiss, poetry (Akron: University of Akron Press, 2002)
- Haywire, poetry (Logan: Utah State University Press, 2006)
- The White Museum, poetry (Pittsburgh: Autumn House Press, 2010)
- Imperial, poetry, (University of Pittsburgh Press, 2014)
- Blood Pages, poetry, (University of Pittsburgh Press, 2018)
- Central Air, poetry, (University of Pittsburgh Press, 2022)
- Cheap Motels of My Youth, poetry, (Rattle Foundation, 2024)

== Poems in periodicals ==
Bilgere's poems have appeared in such publications as Poetry Magazine, Ploughshares, Agni, The Iowa Review, The Sewanee Review, The Kenyon Review, Shenandoah, Chicago Review, New England Review, and Prairie Schooner.

His poems appear frequently on Garrison Keillor’s NPR program, The Writer's Almanac, and in Ted Kooser’s American Life in Poetry.

Bilgere has been a featured guest on Garrison Keillor's "A Prairie Home Companion."

== Awards ==
- Pushcart Prize 2009
- May Swenson Poetry Award (2006)
- The Ohioana Helen and Laura Krout Memorial Poetry Award (2006)
- Cleveland Arts Prize in Literature (2003)
- The University of Akron Poetry Prize (2002)
- Devins Award for Poetry (1994)

== Critical Review ==
Michael Salinger, reviewing a reading from his 2010 book The White Museum, called Bilgere "dangerously clever" and said "Bilgere’s work is deceptively simple. The accessibility that is so often frowned upon by 'serious' poetry instructors invites readers into George's world of cafes where everyday observations take on archetypal importance." John Freeman, writing in The Plain Dealer, said of Imperial, "Manipulating a reader's pace with punctuation, or lack thereof, Bilgere gives us the sense we’re not just there—we’re him, watching. Time speeds up, accelerates, and then it's past. Michael Heaton, reviewing Blood Pages for the Plain Dealer, said: "When I read his stuff, I always marvel at his ability to take the events of everyday life and make them transcendently sacramental and at the same time gently hilarious."
