= Joan Murray =

American poet

- Born: August 6, 1945 (age 81); New York City, U.S.
- Occupations: Poet; writer; editor; playwright

Joan Murray (born August 6, 1945) is an American poet, writer, playwright and editor. She is best known for her narrative poems, particularly her book-length novel-in-verse, Queen of the Mist; her collection Looking for the Parade which won the National Poetry Series Open Competition, and her New and Selected Poems volume, Swimming for the Ark, which was chosen as the inaugural volume in White Pine Press's Distinguished Poets Series.

== Early life and education ==
Joan Murray was born in the South Bronx and attended Hunter College, first as a studio art major, and later as an English major, winning Hunter College's Bernard Cohen fiction prize. She married at 19 and had two children, one of whom died in infancy. She earned an M.A. from New York University and, in 1970, began teaching at Lehman College of the City University of New York.

== Career ==
Murray’s first collection, The Same Water, won the Wesleyan New Poets Series Competition and was a finalist for the Academy of American Poets’ Walt Whitman Award. Her second book, Queen of the Mist, a novel-in-verse about the first person to go over Niagara Falls in a barrel, was chosen by Joyce Carol Oates as runner-up for a Poetry Society of America award; she was also commissioned by Broadway’s Jujamcyn Theaters to adapt it for the stage. Her third book, Looking for the Parade, was chosen by Robert Bly as winner of the National Poetry Series Open Competition. Her fourth book, Dancing on the Edge, was published in connection with her bestselling 9/11 anthology, Poems to Live By in Uncertain Times, and she is also the editor of its anti-war sequel, Poems to Live by in Troubling Times. She was poetry co-editor of The Pushcart Prize 25th Anniversary Edition, and is the editor of The Pushcart Book of Poetry: the Best Poems from Thirty Years of The Pushcart Prize. Her collection, Swimming for the Ark: New & Selected Poems, 1990-2015, was the inaugural volume in the White Pine Press Distinguished Poets Series.

Murray's poetry, fiction, and essays have appeared in many journals including The Atlantic Monthly, Harper's, The Hudson Review, the Paris Review, Poetry, The Nation, The New York Times, The New Yorker; the Village Voice; and in anthologies, including The Best American Poetry and The Pushcart Prize. She has read her work on NPR's Morning Edition, Radiolab, The Bob Edwards Show and The Chautauqua Lectures.

Typically Murray’s poetry focuses on actual people whose situations evoke an empathetic, often social-activist response. Technically, her poems are characterized by a narrative structure, detailed imagery, long, rhythmic, free-verse lines, and emotional effects. The Poetry Foundation has said of it, “Working in free verse, Murray is a master of the single, unforgettable detail. Her accessible, image-driven narratives harness the urgency of their moral or social context while staying true to the pacing and music of daily life.”

In addition to her primary career as a writer and editor, Murray has held the position of Writer in Residence at the New York State Writers Institute at the State University of New York at Albany, and was Poet in Residence at Olana, the Frederic Church Museum. She has also worked as an arts consultant and writer for the New York State Council on the Arts, for whom she designed a grant category to support individual artists, and also coordinated a multi-year project to assist independent literary publishers. She has served as a panelist for The National Endowment for the Arts, The New York State Council on the Arts, and The New York Foundation for the Arts.

Murray currently lives and works in Old Chatham, New York.

== Awards ==
- Prairie Schooner Glenna Luschei Award (2018)
- National Endowment for the Arts Poetry Fellowship (2011–12)
- Pushcart Prize, chosen by Ray Gonzalez and Philip Schultz (2008)
- New York State Council on the Arts Museum Program Grant for Olana residency (2006)
- National Poetry Series Open Competition Winner, chosen by Robert Bly (1999)
- New York Foundation for the Arts Artist Fund Grant for play adaptation (1999)
- National Endowment for the Arts Creation and Presentation Grant for Niagara residency (1998)
- New York State Council on the Arts Writer in Residence Grant (1994)
- Knight Foundation Fellowship at Yaddo for photography and verse collaboration (1994)
- Poetry Society of America Gordon Barber Award Winner, chosen by Billy Collins (1993)
- Poetry Society of America di Castagnola Award Runner-up, chosen by Joyce Carol Oates (1993)
- Poetry Society of America di Castagnola Award Finalist, chosen by Marge Piercy (1992)
- Winner, Wesleyan New Poets, by William Matthews, Pamela Alexander, Chase Twichell (1990)
- National Endowment for the Arts Poetry Fellowship (1989–1990)
- Academy of American Poets Walt Whitman Award Finalist, chosen by Amy Clampitt (1988)
- New York Foundation for the Arts Poetry Fellowship (1988–1989)
- New York State Council on the Arts Writer in Residence Grant (1984–85)
- Pushcart Prize, chosen by Joyce Carol Oates (1984)
- New York State Council on the Arts Writer in Residence Grant (1983–84)
- Residencies at Yaddo, an artist's colony in upstate New York and The MacDowell Colony, an artist's colony in New Hampshire

== Works ==
=== Books ===
- Swimming for the Ark: New and Selected Poems 1990-2015. White Pine Press/Distinguished Poets Series. 2015. ISBN 978-1-935210-63-4., poetry collection
- Dancing on the Edge. Beacon Press. 2002. ISBN 978-0-8070-6871-7., poetry collection
- Looking for the Parade. W W Norton & Co Inc. 2000. ISBN 978-0-393-32064-0. (winner of the 1998 National Poetry Series), poetry collection
- Queen of the Mist: The Forgotten Heroine of Niagara. Beacon Press. 1999. ISBN 978-0-8070-6852-6., novel in verse
- The Same Water. Wesleyan University Press. 1990. ISBN 978-0-8195-1183-6. (Wesleyan New Poets Series winner), poetry collection

=== As editor ===
- The Pushcart Book of Poetry: The Best Poems from 30 Years of the Pushcart Prize. Pushcart Press. 2009. ISBN 978-1-888889-52-9.
- Poems to Live By in Troubling Times. Beacon Press. 2006. ISBN 978-0-8070-6894-6.
- Poems to Live By in Uncertain Times. Beacon Press. 2001. ISBN 978-0-8070-6869-4. "Joan Murray."
- The Pushcart Prize 25th Anniversary Edition. Pushcart Press. 2001. ISBN 978-1-8888-8927-7., poetry co-editor
