= 1996 in poetry =

Nationality words link to articles with information on the nation's poetry or literature (for instance, Irish or France).

== Events ==
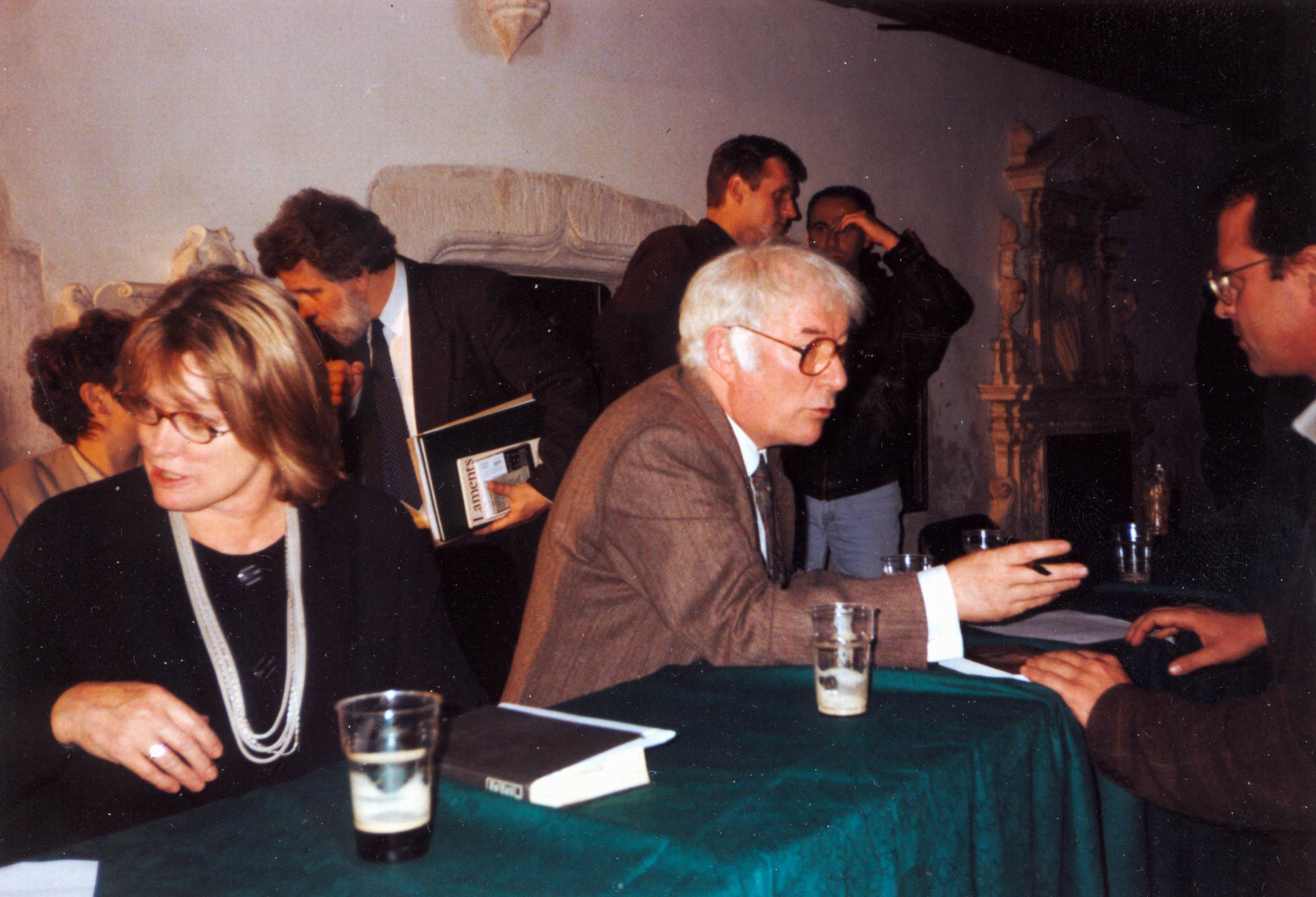
Seamus and Marie Heaney, October 4, 1996, during a visit to Kraków, Poland

- April – National Poetry Month established by the Academy of American Poets as a way to increase awareness and appreciation of poetry in the United States.
- Summer/Autumn – Ledbury Poetry Festival established in England.
- November 11 – A memorial to John Betjeman is unveiled in Poets' Corner of Westminster Abbey by Lady Wilson.

== Works published in English ==
Listed by nation where the work was first published and again by the poet's native land, if different; substantially revised works listed separately:

=== Australia ===
- Raewyn Alexander, Fat, Auckland: Penguin
- Robert Gray, Lineations
- Jennifer Harrison: Cabramatta/Cudmirrah (Black Pepper)
- Les Murray:
  - Late Summer Fires
  - Subhuman Redneck Poems, Carcanet and Sydney, Duffy & Snellgrove winner of the 1996 T. S. Eliot Prize
- Peter Porter, editor, The Oxford book of Modern Australian Verse, Melbourne: Oxford University Press
- Philip Salom: Feeding the Ghost. (Penguin) ISBN 978-0-14-058692-3

=== Canada ===
- Roo Borson, Water Memory, ISBN 0-7710-1589-5 American-Canadian
- Cyril Dabydeen, editor, Another Way to Dance: Contemporary Asian Poetry from Canada and the United States, Toronto: TSAR
- Kristjana Gunnar, Exiles Among You
- Dennis Lee, Nightwatch: New and Selected Poems, 1968-1996
- Sylvia Legris:
  - ash petals (chapbook)
  - Circuitry of Veins
- Steve McCaffery, The Cheat of Words
- George McWhirter, A Staircase for All Souls
- Erín Moure, Search Procedures
- Janis Rapoport, After Paradise
- Joe Rosenblatt, The Voluptuous Gardener. (new poetry and selected drawings from Carleton University Art Gallery permanent collection) Beach Holme Press.
- Stephen Scobie, Taking the Gate: A Journey Through Scotland
- Raymond Souster, Close to Home. Ottawa: Oberon Press.

=== India, in English ===
- Keki N. Daruwalla, A Summer of Tigers ( Poetry in English ), Delhi: Oxford University Press
- Kamala Das, My Story, New Delhi: Sterling Publishers; autobiography

=== Ireland ===
- Pat Boran, The Shape of Water (Dedalus), Ireland
- Ciaran Carson, Opera Et Cetera, Oldcastle: Gallery Press, ISBN 978-1-85235-188-5
- Seán Dunne, Time and the Island, Oldcastle: Gallery Press, ISBN 978-1-85235-181-6
- Seamus Heaney, The Spirit Level
- Thomas McCarthy, The Lost Province, Anvil Press, London
- Ulick O'Connor, Poems of the Damned, a translation of Les Fleurs du mal from the original French of Charles Baudelaire
- Bernard O'Donoghue, Gunpowder, Irish poet living in and published in the United Kingdom

=== New Zealand ===
- James K. Baxter, posthumous, Cold Spring : Baxter's Unpublished Early Collection, edited by Paul Millar, Auckland: Oxford University Press
- Alan Brunton, Romaunt of Glossa: a saga, Bumper Books
- Alistair Campbell, Pocket: Collected Poems, Christchurch: Hazard Press
- Allen Curnow, New and Collected Poems 1941-1995
- Maurice Gee, Loving Ways
- Bill Manhire:
  - My Sunshine
  - Sheet Music: Poems 1967-1982

=== United Kingdom ===
- John Agard and Grace Nichols, A Caribbean Dozen: A Collection of Poems, London: Walker Books (children's book)
- James Berry, Playing a Dazzler
- Ciarán Carson: Opera Et Cetera, Bloodaxe, Wake Forest University Press, Irish poet published in the United Kingdom
- Carol Ann Duffy:
  - Salmon - Carol Ann Duffy: Selected Poems, Salmon Poetry
  - Editor, with Trisha Rafferty, Stopping for Death, Viking (anthology)
- T. S. Eliot, Inventions of the March Hare: Poems 1909-1917, early unpublished verse that the author had said he never wanted published; edited by Christopher Ricks; posthumous
- Seamus Heaney, The Spirit Level Faber & Faber; Northern Ireland poet published in the United Kingdom
- John Heath-Stubbs, Galileo's Salad
- Tobias Hill, Midnight in the City of Clocks
- Grace Nichols, Sunris (no "e" in the title), London: Virago Press
- Bernard O'Donoghue, Gunpowder, Irish poet living in and published in the United Kingdom
- Iona Opie, editor, My Very First Mother Goose, a collection of nursery rhymes
- Alice Oswald, The Thing in the Gap-Stone Stile, Oxford University Press, ISBN 0-19-282513-5
- Craig Raine, Clay: Whereabouts Unknown
- Peter Reading, Collected Poems 1985–1996
- Peter Redgrove:
  - Assembling a Ghost
  - The Book of Wonders: The Best of Peter Redgrove's Poetry, edited by Jeremy Robinson
- Iain Sinclair, editor, Conductors of Chaos: A Poetry Anthology, anthology of poets associated with or seen as precursors to the British Poetry Revival; Picador
- Benjamin Zephaniah, Propa Propaganda

==== Criticism, scholarship, and biography in the United Kingdom ====
- Anthony Cronin, Samuel Beckett: The Last Modernist (London: HarperCollins), one of The New York Times "notable books of the year" for 1997, when it was published in the United States (Irish poet and scholar published in the United Kingdrom)

=== United States ===
- Elizabeth Alexander, Body of Life
- A.R. Ammons, Brink Road
- Virginia Hamilton Adair, Ants on the Melon, the author's first book of poems, at age 83
- Joseph Brodsky: So Forth : Poems, New York: Farrar, Straus & Giroux Russian-American
- Raymond Carver, All of Us: The Collected Poems
- Juliana Chang, editor, Quiet Fire: A Historical Anthology of Asian American poetry, 1892-1970, New York: The Asian American Writers' Workshop
- Ed Dorn, High West Rendezvous
- Robert Fagles, translator, The Odyssey, from the original Ancient Greek of Homer
- Donald Hall, The Old Life, four short poems, a long poem and three elegies
- Robert Hass, Sun Under Wood, lyric poems
- Louise Glück, Meadowlands
- Haim Gouri, Milim Be-Dami Holeh Ahavah ("Words in My Love-Sick Blood"), selected poems in English translation Detroit: Wayne State University Press, ISBN 0-8143-2594-7
- Paul Henry, Captive Audience, Seren
- Mark Jarman and David Mason, editors, Rebel Angels: 25 Poets of the New Formalism
- Ronald Johnson, ARK (Albuquerque: Living Batch Press & University of New Mexico Press)
- Kenneth Koch, The Art of Poetry, Ann Arbor, Michigan: University of Michigan Press (criticism)
- Maxine Kumin, Connecting the Dots
- James McMichael, The World at Large: New and Selected Poems, 1971-1996
- W. S. Merwin
  - Editor, Lament for the Makers: A Memorial Anthology, Washington: Counterpoint
  - Translator, Pieces of Shadow: Selected Poems of Jaime Sabines
  - The Vixen: Poems, New York: Knopf
- Robert Pinsky, The Figured Wheel: New and Collected Poems, 1966-1996
- James Reiss, The Parable of Fire
- Patti Smith, The Coral Sea
- Gary Snyder, Mountains and Rivers Without End
- Brian Swann, editor, Wearing the Morning Star: Native American Song-Poems, New York: Random House
- Henry Taylor, Understanding Fiction: Poems 1986-1996
- C. K. Williams, The Vigil

==== Poets in The Best American Poetry 1996 ====
Poems from these 75 poets were in The Best American Poetry 1996, edited by David Lehman, guest editor Adrienne Rich:

- Latif Asad Abdullah
- Sherman Alexie
- Margaret Atwood
- Thomas Avena
- Marie Annharte Baker
- Sidney Burris
- Rosemary Catacalos
- Marilyn Chin
- Wanda Coleman
- Jacqueline Dash
- Ingrid de Kok
- William Dickey
- Nancy Eimers
- Nancy Eimers
- Martin Espada
- Martin Espada
- Beth Ann Fennelly
- Robert C. Fuentes
- Rámon Garcia, Salmo
- Suzanne Gardinier
- Frank Gaspar
- Reginald Gibbons
- C. S. Giscombe
- Kimiko Hahn
- Gail Hanlon
- Henry Hart
- William Heyen
- Jonathan Johnson
- Jane Kenyon
- August Kleinzahler
- Yusef Komunyakaa
- Stanley Kunitz
- Natasha Le Bel
- Natasha Le Bel
- Carolyn Lei-Lanilau
- Valerie Martínez
- Davis McCombs
- Sandra McPherson
- James Merrill
- W. S. Merwin
- Jane Miller
- Susan Mitchell
- Pat Mora
- Alice Notley
- Naomi Shihab Nye
- Alicia Ostriker
- Raymond Patterson
- Carl Phillips
- Wing Ping
- Sterling Plumpp
- Katherine Alice Power
- Reynolds Price
- Alberto Álvaro Ríos
- Pattiann Rogers
- Quentin Rowan
- David Shapiro
- Angela Shaw
- Reginald Shepherd
- Enid Shomer
- Gary Soto
- Jean Starr
- Deborah Stein
- Roberta Tejada
- Chase Twichell
- Luís Alberto Urrea
- Jean Valentine
- Alma Luz Villanueva
- Karen Volkman
- Diane Wakoski
- Ron Welburn
- Susan Wheeler
- Paul Wilis
- Anne Winters
- C. Dale Young
- Ray A. Young Bear

=== Other in English ===
- Sir Muhammad Iqbal, Bang-i-Dara (The Call Of The Marching Bell), a philosophical poetry book in Urdu; M.A.K. Khalil translation into English of the 1923 work

== Works published in other languages ==
Listed by language or nation where the work was first published and again by the poet's native land, if different; substantially revised works listed separately:

=== Arabic ===
- Abd al-Wahhab Al-Bayyati, "The Dragon", Iraq
- Books of poetry by:
  - in Egypt: Muhammad Salih (poet), Rif'at Sallam, Imad Abu-Salih, and Muhammad Mutawalli
  - in Lebanon: Yahya Jabir, 'Abduh Wazin, and Bassam Hajjar
  - in Syria: Nuri al-Jarrah
  - in Morocco: 'Abd al-Latif Lu'abi, Muhammad Binnis, M. Bin Talhah, Mahdi Khuraif, and Tiraibaq Ahmad

=== Denmark ===
- Naja Marie Aidt, Huset overfor
- Niels Frank, Tabernakel
- Katrine Marie Guldager, Blank, publisher: Gyldendal
- Klaus Høeck, Skovene (døden), publisher: Gyldendal
- Per Højholt, Anekdoter, the end of the author's Praksis series in poetry and prose
- Klaus Rifbjerg, Leksikon
- Søren Ulrik Thomsen; Denmark:
  - Det skabtes vaklen: Arabesker ("The Shaking of Creation"), poetry"
  - En dans på gloser, ("Dancing Attendance on the Word,"), critical essays

=== French language ===
==== Canada, in French ====
- Denise Desautels, «Ma joie», crie-t-elle ("'My joy', she cried"), illustrated with drawings by Francine Simonin, Montréal: Le Noroît
- Suzanne Jacob, Les écrits de l'eau, Montréal: l'Hexagone
- Serge Patrice Thibodeau, Traversée du désert

==== Switzerland, in French ====
- Markus Hediger, Ne retournez pas la pierre, Editions de l'Aire, Vevey

==== France ====
- Michel Butor, A la frontière
- Bertrand Degott, Éboulements et Taillis
- Claude Esteban, Sur la dernière lande, Fourbis
- Michel Houellebecq, Le Sens du combat, poèmes, Flammarion
- Abdellatif Laabi, Le Spleen de Casablanca. La Différence, Paris, Moroccan author writing in French and published in France
- Dominique Pagnier, La Faveur de l'obscurité
- Esther Tellermann, Pangeia
- Joël Vernet, Totems de sable

=== Germany ===
- Christoph Buchwald, general editor, Michael Brown and Michael Buselmeier, guest editors, Jahrbuch der Lyrik 1996/97 ("Poetry Yearbook 1996/97"), publisher: Beck; anthology
- Sarah Kirsch, Bodenlos, winner of the Büchner-Preis
- Inge Müller, Irgendwo: noch einmal möcht ich sehn, poetry, prose, diary, edited and with commentary by Ines Geipel
- Bert Papenfuß, Berliner Zapfenstreich: Schnelle Eingreifsgesänge

=== Hebrew ===
- Ory Bernstein, Zman shel aherim ("Temps des autres")
- Roni Somek, Gan eden le-orez ("Rice Paradise")
- Avner Treinin, Ma`a lot Ahaz ("The Dial of Ahaz")
- Nathan Zach, Mikhevan she`ani baSviva ("Because I'm Around")

=== India ===
Listed in alphabetical order by first name:

- Amarjit Chandan, Beejak, Navyug, New Delhi; Punjabi-language
- Gagan Gill, Andhere men Buddha, New Delhi: Rajkamal Prakashan, New Delhi, 1996, Bharatiya Jnanpith; Hindi-language
- Jiban Narah, Tumi Poka Dhanar Dore, Guwahati, Assam: Puthiniketan; Indian, Assamese-language
- Kedarnath Singh, Bagh, Delhi: Bharatiya Jnanpith; Hindi-language
- K. Satchidanandan, Malayalam; Malayalam-language
- Nilmani Phookan, Cheena Kavita, Guwahati, Assam: Students’ Store, Assamese-language
- Raghavan Atholi, Kandathi, Thrissur: Current Books; Malayalam-language
- Saleel Wagh, Nivadak Kavita, Pune: Time and Space Communications; Marathi-language
- Vasant Abaji Dahake, Shunah-shepa; Marathi-language

=== Italy ===
- Eugenio Montale, Diario postumo: 66 poesie e altre, edited by Annalisa Cima; publisher: Mondadori
- Maria Luisa Spaziani, I fasti dell’ortica
- Andrea Zanzotto, Meteo

=== Latin America ===
- Sergio Badilla Castillo, Nordic Saga Monteverdi Editions. 1996, Santiago de Chile.

=== Norway ===
- Erling Aadland, Poetisk tenkning i Rolf Jacobsens lyrikk, analysis of the verse of Rolf Jacobsen; criticism
- Inger Hagerup, a book of poetry
- Gunvor Hofmo, Samlede dikt
- Sigmund Mjelve, a book of poetry

=== Poland ===
- Stanisław Barańczak, Poezja i duch uogolnienia. Wybor esejow 1970-1995 ("Poetry and the Spirit of Generalization: Selected Essays"), criticism; Kraków: Znak
- Urszula Koziol, Wielka pauza (“The Great Pause”)
- Ryszard Krynicki, Magnetyczny punkt. Wybrane wiersze i przeklady ("The Magnetic Point: Selected Poems and Translations"); Warsaw: CiS
- Ewa Lipska, Wspólnicy zielonego wiatraczka. Lekcja literatury z Krzysztofem Lisowskim ("Partners of the Green Fan: Literature Lesson with Krzysztofem Lisowskim"), selected poems, Kraków: Wydawnictwo literackie
- Czeslaw Milosz:
  - Legendy nowoczesnoshci (“Legends of Modernity”), wartime essays and wartime correspondence with Jerzy Andrzejewski
  - Cóz to za goshcia mielishmy ("What a Guest We Had"), a biography of his friend, the late poet Anna Swirszczynska
- Tadeusz Różewicz, Zawsze fragment. Recycling ("Always a Fragment: Recycling"), Wrocław: Wydawnictwo Dolnośląskie
- Wisława Szymborska: Widok z ziarnkiem piasku ("View with a Grain of Sand"), the author was the winner of the Nobel Prize in Literature this year
- Jan Twardowski, Rwane prosto z krzaka ("Torn Straight From the Bush") Warsaw: PIW

=== Russian ===
- Yevgeny Yevtushenko, "Trinadtsat" ("The Thirteen"), a long poem alluding to "Dvenadtsat" ("The Twelve") by Aleksandr Blok, about the Russian Revolution
- Books of poetry were published by Bella Akhmadulina, Sergey Biryukov, Oleg Chukhontsev, Arkady Dragomoshchenko, Vladimir Gandelsman, Sergey Gandlevsky, Yelena Kabysh, Svetlana Kekova, Aleksandr Kushner, Ilya Kutik, Aleksey Parshchikov, Dmitry Prigov, Lev Rubinshtein, Yelena Shvarts, Genrikh Sapgir, Vladimir Sokolov, and Andrey Voznesensky

=== Spain ===
- Matilde Camus, Reflexiones a medianoche ("Midnight thoughts")
- Ánchel Conte, O tiempo y os días

=== Sweden ===
- Lars Gustafsson, Variationer över ett tema av Silfverstolpe
- Gunnar D. Hansson, AB Neanderthal
- Juris Kronbergs, Vilks vienacis ("Wolf One-Eye", Latvian)
- Lukas Moodysson, Souvenir
- Göran Sonnevi, Mozarts tredje hjärna
- Jesper Svenbro, Vid budet att Santo Bambino di Aracœli slutligen stulits av maffian
- Tomas Tranströmer, Sorgegondolen

=== Yiddish ===
- Joseph Bar-El, Di shire fun Yankev Fridman ("The Poetry of Jacob Friedmann"), criticism
- Joseph Kerler and Dov-Ber Kerler, Shpigl-ksav ("Mirror-writing"); the authors are father and son; Israel
- Yitskhok Niborski, Vi fun a pustn fas ("As Though out of an Empty Barrel"); Israel
- Hadasa Rubin, Rays nisht op di blum ("Don't Tear Up the Flower"); Israel
- Yankev Tsvi Shargel, Tsum eygenem shtern ("To My Own Star"); translations and original poems; Israel

=== Other ===
- Gerrit Komrij, Kijken is bekeken worden; Netherlands
- Wang Huairang, Zhongguoren: buguide ren ("Chinese: A People Not on Its Knees"), China
- Krystyna Rodowska, Na dole płomień W górze płomień, Poland
- Tadeusz Różewicz, Zawsze fragment, Poland
- Hilmi Yavuz, Çöl (“Desert”); Turkey

== Awards and honors ==
- Nobel prize: Wislawa Szymborska

=== Australia ===
- C. J. Dennis Prize for Poetry: Peter Bakowski, In the Human Night
- Kenneth Slessor Prize for Poetry: Eric Beach, Weeping for Lost Babylon
- Mary Gilmore Prize: Morgan Yasbincek - Night Reversing

=== Canada ===
- Gerald Lampert Award: Maureen Hynes, Rough Skin
- Archibald Lampman Award: Gary Geddes, The Perfect Cold Warrior
- 1996 Governor General's Awards: E. D. Blodgett, Apostrophes: Woman at a Piano (English); Serge Patrice Thibodeau, Le Quatuor de l'errance / La Traversée du désert (French)
- Pat Lowther Award: Lorna Crozier, Everything Arrives at the Light
- Prix Alain-Grandbois: Hélène Dorion, Sans bord, sans bout du monde
- Dorothy Livesay Poetry Prize: Patrick Lane, Too Spare, Too Fierce
- Prix Émile-Nelligan: Carle Coppens, Poèmes contre la montre

=== United Kingdom ===
- Cholmondeley Award: Elizabeth Bartlett, Dorothy Nimmo, Peter Scupham, Iain Crichton Smith
- Eric Gregory Award: Sue Butler, Cathy Cullis, Jane Griffiths, Jane Holland, Chris Jones, Sinéad Morrissey, Kate Thomas
- Forward Poetry Prize Best Collection: John Fuller, Stones and Fires (Chatto & Windus)
- Forward Poetry Prize Best First Collection: Kate Clanchy, Slattern (Chatto & Windus)
- Orange Prize for Fiction: Helen Dunmore, A Spell of Winter
- Queen's Gold Medal for Poetry: Peter Redgrove
- T. S. Eliot Prize (United Kingdom and Ireland): Les Murray, Subhuman Redneck Poems
- Whitbread Award for poetry and for book of the year (United Kingdom): Seamus Heaney, The Spirit Level

=== United States ===
- Agnes Lynch Starrett Poetry Prize: Helen Conkling, Red Peony Night
- AML Award for poetry to Leslie Norris for Collected Poems
- Bernard F. Connors Prize for Poetry: John Voiklis, "The Princeling's Apology", and (separately) Sarah Arvio, "Visits from the Seventh"
- Bobbitt National Prize for Poetry: Kenneth Koch, One Train
- National Book Award for poetry: Hayden Carruth, Scrambled Eggs & Whiskey
- Pulitzer Prize for Poetry: Jorie Graham: The Dream of the Unified Field
- Rhysling Award:
  - Marge Simon, Variants of the Obsolete, (Long Form)
  - Bruce Boston, Future Present: A Lesson in Expectation (Short Form)
- Ruth Lilly Poetry Prize: Gerald Stern
- Wallace Stevens Award: Adrienne Rich
- Whiting Awards: Brigit Pegeen Kelly, Elizabeth Spires, Patricia Storace
- Fellowship of the Academy of American Poets: Jay Wright

=== Awards and honors elsewhere ===
- Denmark:
  - Golden Laurels: Henrik Nordbrandt
  - Critics' Prize: Per Højholt
- Japan: Sakutaro Hagiwara Prize in Poetry: Masao Tsuji for Haikai Tsuji shu ("Poems of Haikai Tsuji")
- Spain: Cervantes Prize: José García Nieto
- Turkey: President's Award: Cahit Külebi

== Deaths ==
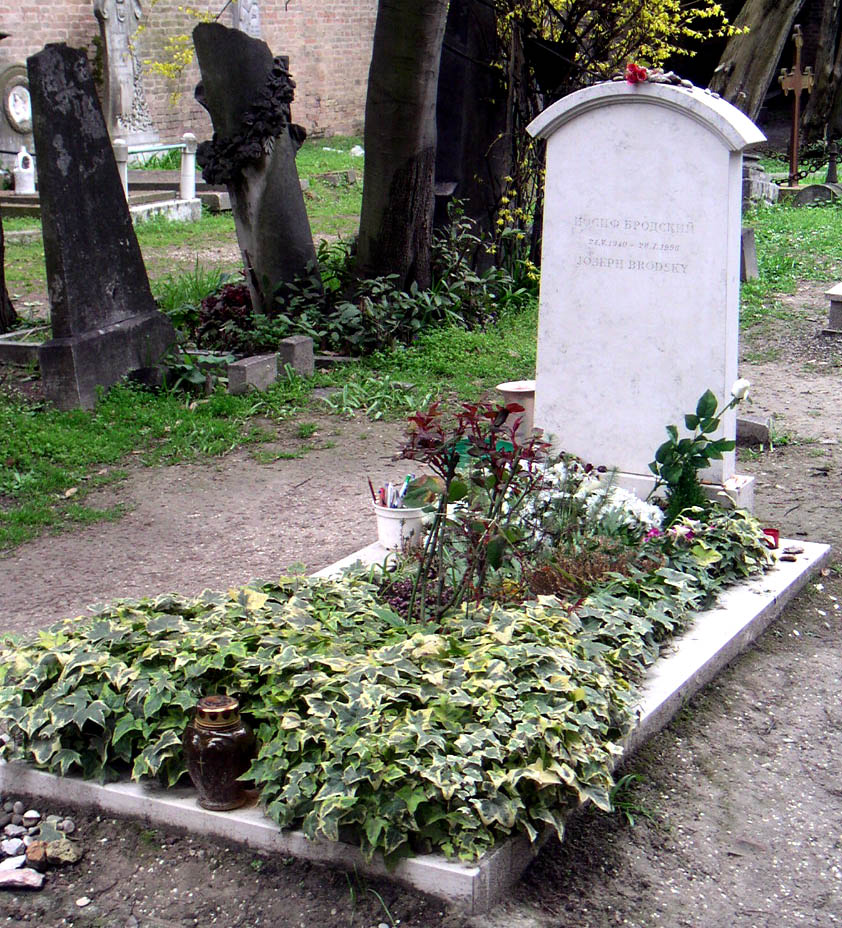
Brodsky's grave in San Michele

Birth years link to the corresponding "[year] in poetry" article:

- January 28 – Joseph Brodsky, 55 (born 1940), Russian-American poet and essayist, awarded Nobel Prize in Literature (1987) and chosen Poet Laureate of the United States (1991–1992), of a heart attack
- February 11 – Amelia Rosselli, 66 (born 1950), Italian poet and ethnomusicologist, from suicide, on the same date Sylvia Plath killed herself.
- March 18 – Odysseus Elytis, Greek
- April 13 – George Mackay Brown, 74, Scottish poet, author and dramatist
- May 8 – Larry Levis, 49, American poet, of a heart attack
- May 11 – Sam Ragan (born 1915), American poet, journalist; North Carolina Poet Laureate, 1982–1996
- August 18 – Geoffrey Dearmer, 103, English poet
- September 25 – Mina Loy, 83, artist, poet, Futurist, actor
- November 13 – Margaret Steuart Pollard (Peggy Pollard), 93 (born 1904), English bard of the Cornish Gorsedd, philanthropist, oriental scholar and eccentric
- November 24 – Sorley MacLean, 85, Scottish
- December 10 – Dorothy Porter, 54, Australian poet
- December 14 – Gaston Miron, 68 Canada
- Date not known:
  - Haermann Kesten (born 1900), German
  - Tom Rawling (born 1916), English poet and angler
  - Constance Urdang, American poet and novelist, wife of Donald Finkel

== See also ==
- Poetry
- List of years in poetry
- List of poetry awards
