= The Best American Poetry 1996 =

The Best American Poetry 1996, a volume in The Best American Poetry series, was edited by David Lehman and by guest editor Adrienne Rich.

== Poets and poems included ==
Poet	Poem	Where poem previously appeared
Latif Asad Abdullah	"The Tombs"	Extracts from Pelican Bay
Sherman Alexie	"Capital Punishment"	Indiana Review
Margaret Atwood	"Morning in the Burned House"	North American Review
Thomas Avena	"Cancer Garden"	The Occident
Marie Annharte Baker	"Porkskin Panorama"	Callaloo
Sidney Burris	"Strong's Winter"	The Southern Review
Rosemary Catacalos	"David Talamantez on the Last Day of Second Grade"	The Texas Observer
Marilyn Chin	"Cauldron"	The Kenyon Review
Wanda Coleman	"American Sonnet (35)"	River City
Jacqueline Dash	"Me Again"	In Time
Ingrid de Kok	"Transfer"	TriQuarterly
William Dickey	"The Arrival of the Titanic"	Poetry
Nancy Eimers	"A Night Without Stars"	Alaska Review Quarterly
Nancy Eimers	"A History of Navigation"	Poetry Northwest
Martin Espada	"Rednecks"	Ploughshares
Martin Espada	"Sleeping on the Bus"	The Progressive
Beth Ann Fennelly	"Poem Not to Be; Read at Your Wedding"	Farmer's Market
Robert C. Fuentes	"In This Place"	Extracts from Pelican Bay
Rámon Garcia, Salmo	"Para El"	The Americas Review
Suzanne Gardinier	"Two Girls"	The American Voice
Frank Gaspar	"Kapital"	The Kenyon Review
Reginald Gibbons	"White Beach"	The Southern Review
C. S. Giscombe	"All (Facts, Stories, Chance)"	River Styx
Kimiko Hahn	"Possession: A Zuihitsu"	Another Chicago Magazine
Gail Hanlon	"Plainsong"	Poetry Flash
Henry Hart	"The Prisoner of Camau"	Beloit Poetry Journal
William Heyen	"The Steadying"	Triquarterly
Jonathan Johnson	"Renewal"	Cream City Review
Jane Kenyon	"Reading Aloud to My Father"	Poetry
August Kleinzahler	"Two Canadian Landscapes"	Private
Yusef Komunyakaa	"Nude Study"	The Kenyon Review
Stanley Kunitz	"Touch Me"	The New Yorker
Natasha Le Bel	"Foot Fire Burn Dance"	Hanging Loose
Natasha Le Bel	"Boxing the Female"	Hanging Loose
Carolyn Lei-Lanilau	"Kolohe or Communication"	Manoa
Valerie Martínez	"It Is Not"	Prairie Schooner
Davis McCombs	"The River and Under the River"	No Roses Review
Sandra McPherson	"Edge Effect"	Poetry
James Merrill	"b o d y"	The New York Times
W. S. Merwin	"Lament for the Makers"	Poetry
Jane Miller	"Far Away"	Colorado Review
Susan Mitchell	"Girl Tearing Up Her Face"	The Paris Review
Pat Mora	"Mangos y limones"	Prairie Schooner
Alice Notley	"One of the Longest Times"	Fourteen Hills
Naomi Shihab Nye	"The Small Vases from Hebron"	Many Mountains Moving
Alicia Ostriker	"The Eighth and Thirteenth"	Poetry Flash
Raymond Patterson	"Harlem Suite"	Drumvoices Revue
Carl Phillips	"As From a Quiver of Arrows"	The Atlantic Monthly
Wing Ping	"Song of Calling Souls"	Sulfur
Sterling Plumpp	"Poet and When the Spirit; Spray-Paints the Sky"	TriQuarterly
Katherine Alice Power	"Sestina for Jaime"	In Time
Reynolds Price	"Twenty-One Years"	The Southern Review
Alberto Alvaro Ríos	"Domingo Limón"	Prairie Schooner
Pattiann Rogers	"Abundance and Satisfaction"	Iowa Review
Quentin Rowan	"Prometheus at Coney Island"	Hanging Loose
David Shapiro	"For the Evening Land"	Lingo
Angela Shaw	"Crepuscule"	Poetry
Reginald Shepherd	"Skin Trade"	Ploughshares
Enid Shomer	"Passive Resistance"	Poetry
Gary Soto	"Fair Trade"	Prairie Schooner
Jean Starr	"Flight"	Callaloo
Deborah Stein	"heat"	Hanging Loose
Roberta Tejada	"Honeycomb perfection of this form before me..."	Sulfur
Chase Twichell	"Aisle of Dogs"	Iowa Review
Luís Alberto Urrea	"Ghost Sickness"	Many Mountains Moving
Jean Valentine	"Tell Me, What Is the Soul"	The New Yorker
Alma Luz Villanueva	"Crazy Courage"	Prairie Schooner
Karen Volkman	"The Case"	The Paris Review
Diane Wakoski	"The Butcher's Apron"	Many Mountains Moving
Ron Welburn	"Yellow Wolf Spirit"	Callaloo
Susan Wheeler	"Run on a Warehouse"	The Paris Review
Paul Wilis	"Meeting Like This"	Weber Studies
Anne Winters	"The Mill-Race"	TriQuarterly
C. Dale Young	"Vespers"	The Southern Review
Ray A. Young Bear	"Our Bird Aegis"	Callaloo

== See also ==
- 1996 in poetry
