= Dehak - A Magazine For Good Literature =

Dehak - A Journal For Good Literature
- Editor and publisher: Yehuda Vizan
- Categories: Literary journal
- Frequency: annual
- Circulation: 500 (approx. 650 pages per issue)
- Publisher: Dehak For Good Literature
- First issue: 2011
- Country: Israel
- Based in: Tel Aviv
- Language: Hebrew
- Website: http://mitzlolpoetry.wix.com/dehak

Dehak - A Journal For Good Literature (in Hebrew: דְּחָק - כתב עת לספרות טובה) is an Israeli literary magazine edited by Yehuda Vizan, dealing with a wide range of subjects from poetry, prose, drama and philosophy to Judaism, criticism, art and political thought. "Dehak" is a biblical word meaning "stress" or "push" or "emergency" or a "time of need".

== Issues ==
The first issue appeared in 2011 and was accused by critics (such as Menahem Ben), due to its "Maskili" nature, of being too "snobbish and condescending".

Later issues were praised by critics, both conservatives (Makor Rishon) and liberals (Haaretz, Yitzhak Laor), as Israel's leading literature magazine.

Dehak is a printed magazine. Past issues are available online for free reading (in Hebrew) at the magazine website.

Alongside the magazine operates a small press which publishes Hebrew & translated poetry, drama and criticism.

== Contributors ==
Among its permanent contributors are many of Israel's predominant poets, authors, scholars, artists and translators.

== Notable interviews ==
The magazine has published many interviews with notable personalities such as: John Searle, Charles Simic, Hilary Putnam, Adam Zagajewski, Noam Chomsky, Nathan Zach, Luc Tuymans, Roger Scruton, Aharon Shabtai, Charles Bernstein, Marjorie Perloff, Razmik Davoyan, Paul Muldoon, Richard Swinburne, Rae Armantrout, Dieter Henrich, Daniel Dennett, Richard Greene, Allen W. Wood, Michaël Borremans, Terry Pinkard, Nikolai Tolstoy, Peter Cole, Meir Wieseltier, Roger Kimball, Ya'acov Dorchin, Armen Darbinyan, Tobias Wolff, Tom Rockmore, Robert Stern, Christian Bök, Hrant Bagratyan, Timur Kibirov, Susan Howe, Alain de Benoist, George Szirtes, Alice Oswald, Aleksandr Dugin, Christine Korsgaard, Ron Silliman, Alan Riach, Sasha Sokolov, Paul O'Prey, Vladimir Gandelsman, Ryszard Legutko, Andrew Motion and others.
