= Langston Hughes Medal =

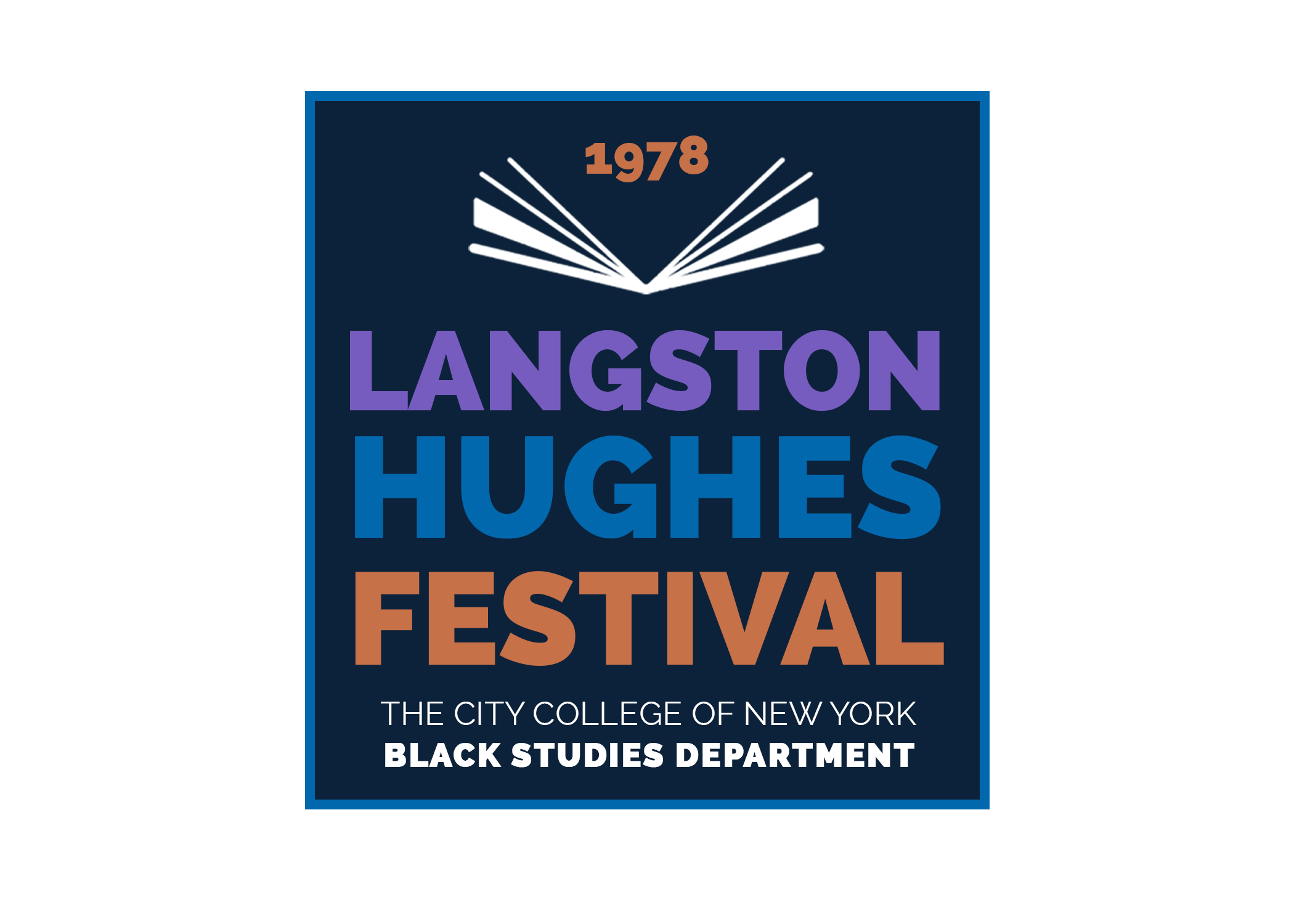
- Named after: Langston Hughes
- Formation: 1973
- Founder: Raymond R. Patterson
- Founded at: The City College of New York
- Purpose: Writing Award celebrates distinguished writers associated with Africa, and the African Diaspora
- Headquarters: Harlem, New York
- Chair of the Langston Hughes Festival: Jervette R. Ward
- Advisory Committee and Board: Jodi-Ann Francis; Emmanuel Lachaud; Felice Neals; Emily Raboteau; Gregory Shank; Norval Soleyn; Michelle Valladares; Kedon Willis; Laurie Woodard
- Dean of the Division of Humanities and the Arts: Renata K. Miller
- President of the City College of New York: Vincent G. Boudreau
- Main organ: Committee and Board
- Parent organization: The City College of New York
- Website: Langston Hughes Festival Medal

The Langston Hughes Medal is awarded to highly distinguished writers from throughout the African diaspora for their impressive works of poetry, fiction, drama, autobiography and critical essays that help to celebrate the memory and tradition of Langston Hughes. Each year, the Langston Hughes Festival's Advisory Committee and board reviews the work of major black writers from Africa and the African diaspora whose work is assessed as likely "having a lasting impact on world literature."

A medallion has been awarded annually during the Langston Hughes Festival, at City College of New York, since 1978.

== Langston Hughes Festival ==
The Langston Hughes Festival is an annual celebration that began in 1973 and it was created to honor the life and work of the Poet laureate, leader of the Harlem Renaissance, and American literary icon Langston Hughes (1902-1967).

Initially produced by the Department of English, City College of New York, the Festival was founded, directed and sustained by Professor Emeritus Raymond R. Patterson (1929-2001) during his twenty-five years with the Department. Other key founders of the festival are Professor Nathaniel Norment, Jerome brooks, alongside the inaugural Coral-Speaking Festival Coordinator, Jeanette Adams.

Established to bring the great writers of the African-American experience and the international African diaspora to the City College of New York and at other venues around New York City, and to encourage creative activity, the festival dedicated itself to the Harlem community, in honor of Hughes' long time residence.

The festival is typically a one or two-day affair that includes musical interludes, film screenings, student performances, panel discussions, and dramatic productions. In addition to awarding the Langston Hughes medallion, the festival offers conferences and symposia, where distinguished scholars from around the country and the world are invited to discuss Black literature and the arts.

In addition, the festival sponsors the Langston Hughes Choral-Speaking Festival, an event that draws 300-400 young scholars from New York City public schools to creatively recite or enact Hughes’ poetry.

As of 2024, The Langston Hughes Festival is produced by the Black Studies Department, City College of New York.

== Mission ==
The Langston Hughes Festival has been in existence since 1973. Its mission is to celebrate and expand upon the literary legacy of the Poet Laureate of Harlem, New York, Langston Hughes. The Langston Hughes Medal is awarded to the most distinguished writers associated with the African diaspora. The medal is presented as the culmination of a day of salons, scholarly conferences and symposia, and artistic expression in celebration of the legacy of Langston Hughes, as well as a creative performance in tribute to the honoree and an interview of and reading by the honoree.

== The Medal ==
While the Langston Hughes Festival was created in 1973, the idea of the medallion was conceived and awarded for the first time in 1978 to James Baldwin. On March 17, 1978, James Baldwin spoke at his “homecoming tribute” and was presented with the Martin Luther King Memorial Medal for his “lifelong dedication to humanitarian ideals.” Since April 1984, when Ralph Ellison was honored, the festival began to present each honoree with the Langston Hughes medallion. The tradition continued, and the Langston Hughes Medal is awarded annually at the Langston Hughes Festival to highly distinguished writers from throughout the African American diaspora for their impressive works of poetry, fiction, drama, autobiography and critical essays that help to celebrate the memory and tradition of Langston Hughes.

Created by Lawrence F. Sykes of Rhode Island College, the bronze medal's design was based on a photograph in the Langston Hughes papers at Yale University (courtesy of the late George Houston Bass, executor of the Langston Hughes estate).

Each year, the Langston Hughes’ Advisory Committee and Board reviews the work of major black writers from Africa to America whose work is accessed as likely having a lasting impact on world literature. Past award winners include James Baldwin, Gwendolyn Brooks, Toni Morrison, August Wilson, Wole Soyinka, Derek Walcott, Octavia E. Butler, and Edwidge Danticat. Writers selected for this award receive the Langton Hughes Medal, an honorarium and an invitation to attend the Langston Hughes Festival Award Ceremony in the Marian Anderson Theatre at Aaron Davis Hall at The City College of New York in Harlem.

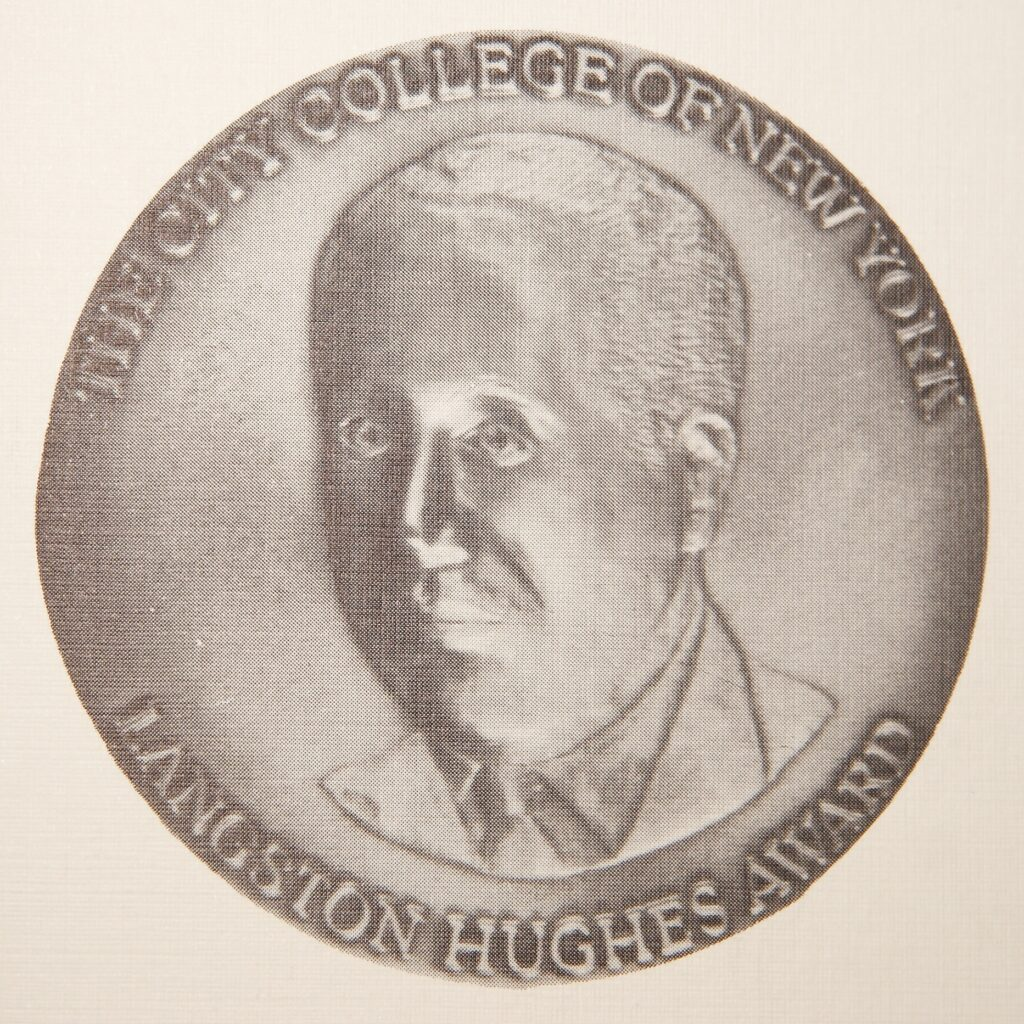
Langston Hughes Medallion

== 2025 Langston Hughes Medal ==
In 2024, the Langston Hughes Festival announced the 2025 Langston Hughes Medalist is Roxane Gay. The festival took place on February 13–14, 2025. The theme was Black Love Day, a celebration that takes place on February 13.

== Previous recipients of Langston Hughes Medallion ==
Recipients of the Langston Hughes medallion are:

- James Baldwin (1978)
- Gwendolyn Brooks (1979)
- John Oliver Killens (1980)
- Toni Cade Bambara (1981)
- Paule Marshall (1981)
- Toni Morrison (1981)
- Sterling A. Brown (1982)
- Margaret Walker Alexander (1983)
- Ralph W. Ellison (1984)
- Raymond R. Patterson (1986)
- Dennis Brutus (1987)
- Alice Walker (1988)
- Amiri Baraka (1989)
- Alice Childress (1990)
- Maya Angelou (1991)
- August Wilson (1992)
- Chinua Achebe (1993)
- Ernest Gaines (1994)
- Ishmael Reed (1995)
- Nikki Giovanni (1996)
- Albert Murray (1997)
- George Lamming (1998)
- Sonia Sanchez (1999)
- Wole Soyinka (2000)
- Jayne Cortez (2001)
- Derek Walcott (2002)
- Lucille Clifton (2003)
- James A. Emanuel (2003)
- Sekou Sundiata (2003)
- Arnold Rampersad (2003)
- John Edgar Wideman (2004)
- Octavia Butler (2005)
- Gregory H. Williams (2008)
- Edwidge Danticat (2011)
- Walter Mosley (2014)
- Jacqueline Woodson (2015)
- Ntozake Shange (2016)
- Zadie Smith (2017)
- Hilton Als (2018)
- Rita Dove (2019)
- Michael Eric Dyson (2020)
- Jamaica Kincaid (2021)
- Lynn Nottage (2023)
- Colson Whitehead (2024)

== Ex-Officio and Past Chair of the Festival ==
Raymond R. Patterson, Jo-Ann Hamilton, Victoria Chevalier, Gordon Thompson, Retha Powers, and Vanessa K. Valdés
