= Posthumous Diary =

Posthumous Diary (Diario postumo) is a series of poems attributed to the Italian poet Eugenio Montale which first appeared in full in 1996 (see 1996 in poetry). It was purported to be conceived as a literary time-bomb carried out with the help of a young fan, Annalisa Cima.

In 1969 Montale began to give a poem to Cima at each meeting. In 1979 he divided the poems into eleven envelopes. Ten (numbered I to X) contained six poems each, while the eleventh contained another packet of six poems (numbered XI) as well as eighteen additional poems for three further envelopes. Montale entrusted the collection to Cima under the condition that they would not appear until after his death.

In 1986 the Schlesinger Foundation began issuing a limited edition series of booklets, numbered I to XI, for each group of six poems. A twelfth volume appeared in 1996 with the remaining eighteen poems, and in the same year followed a collection of the entire series published by Mondadori. A strong doubt about the authenticity of the work was expressed in particular by Dante Isella and Giovanni Raboni a few years after the publication of the diary. These criticisms were opposed by favorable opinions from the editor, Rosanna Bettarini, and other philologists and literary scholars including Maria Corti, a personal witness to Montale's transfer of numerous unpublished works to Annalisa Cima in the seventies. The autographs of the Diario postumo were later exhibited in Lugano, between October 24 and 26, 1997, in conjunction with a celebratory conference organized by Annalisa Cima at the Splendid hotel.

In this context, Maria Corti declared that she had personally witnessed a transfer of papers from Montale to Cima, and that she had received from Montale himself news of the Diario postumo project ("Repubblica", September 4, 1997, see External links), and said she was "convinced, after seeing the autographs, that the corrections are 'absolutely Montale's'" ("L'Unità", October 25, 1997).

Giuseppe Savoca then published the "Concordanza", an analysis of the texts of the Diario compared with Montale's other works and with the poet's inspirational sources. After the Lugano conference, the facsimiles contained in Savoca's work remained the only consultable copies of the autographs.

After about a decade of relative calm, the controversy was revived in 2014 with the publication of the volume "I filologi e gli angeli. È di Eugenio Montale il Diario postumo?" by Federico Condello, which analyzes in detail the editorial history of the Diario, highlighting various inconsistencies. This publication was followed by a conference in Bologna in November 2014, the proceedings of which were published in a miscellaneous volume in 2016, "Montale e pseudo Montale. Autopsia del 'Diario postumo'". This volume offers numerous linguistic, metrical, and stylistic analyses, as well as some documentary investigations that, referring to the materials used (mainly the fac-simile of the autograph manuscripts of the Diario) or to letters and notes preserved in the Scheiwiller Archive (now at the Apice Center of the University of Milan), allow the reconstruction of some periods of Annalisa Cima's activity, especially between 1981 and 1986. These documents do not show any element in favor of the authenticity thesis, while some data conflict with all the reconstructions proposed in the various statements of the dedicatee of the Diario.

Following this event, given the increasingly urgent need to definitively clarify the question of the diary's authenticity, Annalisa Cima was formally requested, through an open letter signed by over one hundred scholars and dated February 23, 2015, to provide the original autograph manuscripts of the Diario, still in possession of the Schlesinger foundation and preserved in Lugano, to be analyzed.

"It would have been sufficient to ask me for them. They would have avoided laboring over nothing," Cima had declared three months earlier, referring to the Bologna conference (Bruno Quaranta, "Il mio Montale: così giocava per confondere i critici", "La Stampa", November 19, 2014).

To date (July 2024) this request has still not received a response, also due to the death of Annalisa Cima herself on September 5, 2019.

In 2019, Giuseppe Marcenaro ("Il giallo del poeta", "Il Foglio", July 22, 2019) revealed the testimony (September 4, 1997) of the poet's nephew, Paolo Montale. "He is amused by what is happening. With simplicity, joking about his own lack of insight, he tells me: 'Now I understand the meaning of what my uncle once confided to me: 'You'll see what chaos will break out after my death'". Posthumous Diary was translated into English by Jonathan Galassi and published in 2001.
