= Raymond Patterson =

Raymond or Ray Patterson may refer to:

- Muhammad Ali (drummer) (born 1936), American jazz drummer, originally named Raymond Patterson
- Ray Patterson (animator) (1911–2001), American animator, producer, and director
- Ray Patterson (basketball) (1922–2011), American basketball player, high jumper, and general manager
- Raymond M. Patterson (1898–1984), English writer and explorer
- Raymond R. Patterson (1929–2001), African-American poet
- Raymond Patterson (decathlete) (born 1913), American decathlete, 3rd at the 1933 USA Outdoor Track and Field Championships
- Ray Patterson, character guest-voiced by Steve Martin in Trash of the Titans, the 22nd episode of Season 9 of US animated comedy The Simpsons.

== See also ==
- Lyman Ray Patterson (1929–2003), American copyright scholar
- Patterson (disambiguation)
