= Dunes Review =

Online literary magazine

- Categories: Literary journal
- Frequency: Twice a year
- Publisher: Michigan Writers
- Founder: Anne-Marie Oomen
- Founded: 1996
- First issue: 1997
- Country: United States
- Based in: Traverse City, Michigan
- Language: English
- Website: www.dunesreview.org
- ISSN: 1545-3111

Dunes Review is a literary magazine based in northern Michigan. It is sponsored by both Michigan Writers of Grand Traverse County, Michigan and the Glen Arbor Art Association of Leelanau County, Michigan. The Beach Bards of Glen Arbor also contribute financially to the poetry prizes.

== History ==
The Dunes Review Writing Project was launched in 1996 by local poet, playwright, and writing teacher, Anne-Marie Oomen. The magazine's key early focus was on promoting regional writing and raising awareness about Northern Michigan writers, as well as utilizing art by local artists for its cover. It was originally sponsored by the Glen Arbor Arts Association and the Traverse City Arts Council with the financial support of a mini-grant from the Michigan Council for the Arts and Cultural Affairs. Their first issue was published in the spring of 1997.

In 2002, there was a transition in management. The Glen Arbor Art Association began to share financial, advisory, and publication responsibilities with Michigan Writers (Traverse City). Today, the magazine focuses not only on the best local writers, but also regional and national writers.

== Contributors ==
- Jim Daniels, poet and Brittingham Prize in Poetry recipient.
- Nancy Eimers, poet and Whiting Writers' Award recipient.
- Allison Leigh Peters, poet and University of Michigan Academy of American Poets Prize (undergrad) recipient.
- Jack Ridl, poet and Gary Gildner Award recipient.
- Teresa Scollon, poet and National Endowment for the Arts Grant for Literature recipient.
- Diane Seuss, poet and Juniper Prize recipient.
- Alison Swan, poet/essayist and Heekin Prize finalist.

== Contests ==
The magazine has held four distinct contests:

- The "Anne-Marie Oomen Poetry Prize" (2003–2006), an annual contest held for high school students.
- The "Leelanau Poetry Prize" (1997–2001), an annual poetry contest.
- The "William J. Shaw Memorial Prize for Poetry" (1997–present), an annual contest named for a professor of the literary arts from Northwestern Michigan College.
- The "Youth Poetry Prize" (1997–2001), a poetry contest for poets under 18 years old.

== Reviews ==
"A hearty appetite for literature can be sated with the latest Dunes Review journal and 2011 chapbooks by Denise R. Baker (poetry) and Joan Schmeichel (short fiction) — all published by Michigan Writers." --Glen Arbor Sun
