= Yehuda Vizan =

Israeli poet and editor (born 1985)

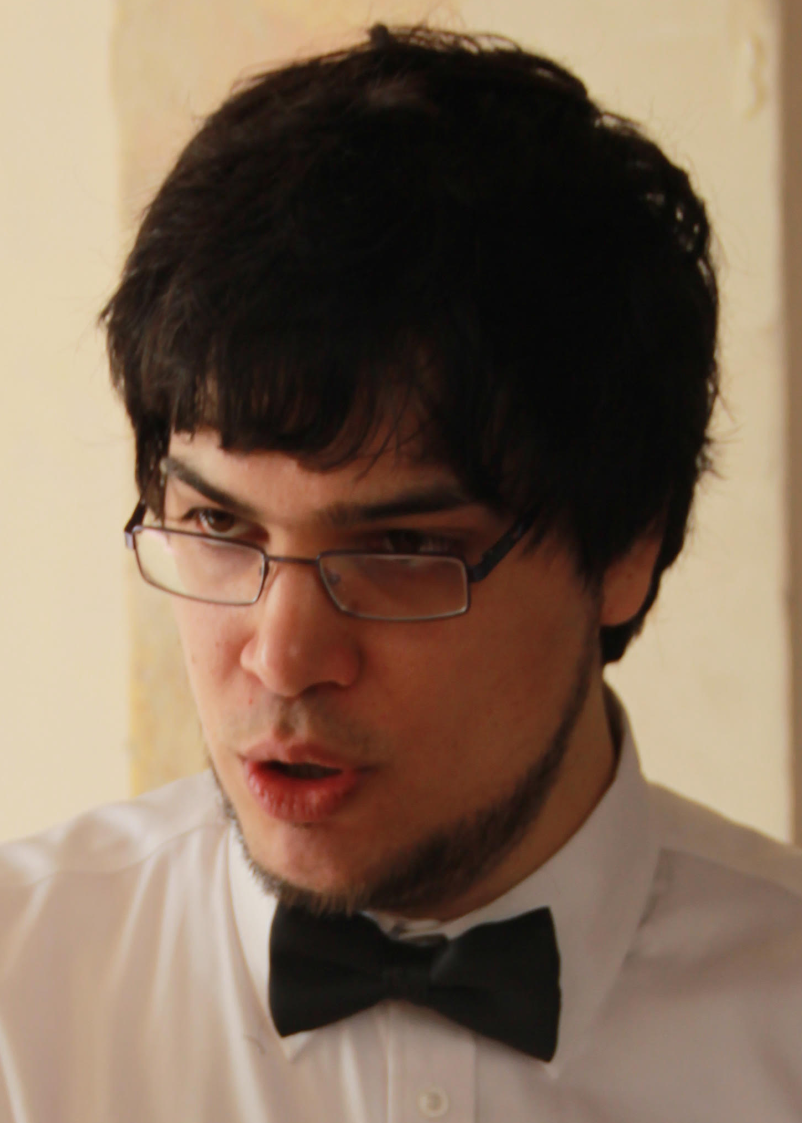
Yehuda Vizan

Yehuda Vizan (Hebrew: יהודה ויזן; born 1985 in Yehud) is an Israeli poet, editor, translator and critic. Vizan is the editor and founder of Dehak - A Magazine For Good Literature. In 2022, he received the Prime Minister's Prize for Hebrew Literary Works.

== Poetry ==
Vizan has published six books of poetry:

- Poems of Yehuda (Ah'shav, 2006)
- Introduction to Light Aesthetics (Plonit, 2008)
- Wringed (Ah'shav/Dehak, 2012)
- Counter-Regulations (Makom LeShira, 2016)
- Selected Poems 2005-2020 (Carmel, 2020)
- Intermediate book (blima, 2025). Won Uri Zvi Greenberg Award for poetry.

== Prose ==
- Pekah (Achuzat Bayit, 2016). Won the Minister of Culture Award for a first novel.

== Children's book ==
- "At Helel and Lilith's of the Galilee city" (illustrated by Noa Ṿikhansḳi, Keren, 2019)

== Editing ==
- Ketem - a poetry newspaper (first three issues alongside Oded Carmeli), 2006-2008.
- Charles Baudelaire - Douze petits poemes en prose, translated by: David Frischmann & Uri Nissan Gnessin (Dehak, 2010)
- Ezra Pound - Selected Writings (Dehak, 2014)
- Dehak - A Magazine For Good Literature, 2011-to present.
- Hebrew Poetry of the Haskalah: A Selection, alongside Yehosheva Samet Shinberg (Dehak, 2020)

== Translation ==
- T. S. Eliot - Murder in the Cathedral. alongside Orit Gat, (Ah'shav, 2009)
- T. S. Eliot - Sweeney Agonistes (Ah'shav, 2009).
- Virginia Woolf - Freshwater (Dehak, 2010)
- Art Spiegelman - Maus: A Survivor's Tale, Volumes I and II (Mineged, 2010)
- Natan Zach - Imagism and Vorticism (Dehak, 2010)
- James Joyce - The Cat and the Devil (Dehak, 2012)
- James Joyce - The Cats of Copenhagen (Achuzat Bayit, 2019)
- H. G. Wells - Marxism vs. Liberalism, An Interview Of Joseph Stalin By H.G. Wells (Dehak, 2013)
- Words, Words, Words – On Hamlet. A selection of essays about the play by Voltaire, Samuel Johnson, Coleridge, Chesterton, Arnold, Eliot, Auden, Poe, Wilde & Goethe. (Resling, 2016)
- William Faulkner - The Wishing Tree, (Rimonim, 2016)
- Other People's Poems - English poetry translations (Ah'shav, 2016)
- Flannery O'Connor - The Nature and Aim of Fiction (Dehak, 2021)
- Wallace Stevens - Adagia (Dehak, 2022)

Vizan has also translated dozens of poems, essays and short plays by writers such as: Ezra Pound, T.S. Eliot, T.E. Hulme, Wyndham Lewis, Charles Olson, Louis Zukofsky, Dorothy Parker, Edgar Allan Poe, Philip Larkin, Frank O'Hara, W.H. Auden, Robert Creeley, Edward Lear, Flannery O'Connor, G. K. Chesterton, Wallace Stevens, Edith Sitwell, Hope Mirrlees, Robert Duncan, William Blake and many others. he also published a translation of several fragments from Joyce's Finnegans Wake.
