= Jack Ridl =

American poet (born 1944)

Jack Ridl (born April 10, 1944) is an American poet, and was a professor of English at Hope College.

== Life and career ==
Ridl's father, Charles "Buzz" Ridl, coached basketball at Westminster College, Pennsylvania and the University of Pittsburgh. Ridl graduated from Westminster College, Pennsylvania with a BA in 1967 and M.Ed., in 1970. He lives in Laketown Township, Michigan, with his wife, Julie.

His work has appeared in LIT, The Georgia Review, FIELD, Poetry, Ploughshares, Prairie Schooner, Gulf Coast, The Denver Quarterly, Chelsea, Free Lunch, The Journal, Passages North, Dunes Review, and Poetry East. Hope College has named its Visiting Writers Series for him.

The sun rises over the trees behind our
house and the dogs want out. Today

it's supposed to snow again. Tonight
we'll have soup, just the two of us

and talk about our month in Italy,
how we wondered if we could live

in all that light. We'll remember
the last time we danced alone.

== Awards ==
- 2013 ForeWord Reviews' INDIEFAB Book of the Year Award for Practicing to Walk Like a Heron—Winner of the Gold Medal in the category of Poetry (Adult Nonfiction)
- 2007 Society of Midland Authors Award for Broken Symmetry in the category of Poetry
- 2002 Say-the-Word Poetry Award from The Ellipse Art Center in Arlington, Virginia, for "The Dry Wallers Listen to Sinatra While They Work", chosen by David St. John
- 2001 Chapbook Award from The Center for Book Arts in New York City, for Against Elegies, selected by Sharon Dolin and Billy Collins
- 1996, The Carnegie Foundation named him Michigan Professor of the Year.

== Works ==
- The same ghost: poems. Dawn Valley Press. 1984. ISBN 978-0-936014-13-5.
- After School, Samisdat Press. 1988.
- Between. Dawn Valley Press. 1988. ISBN 978-0-936014-18-0.
- Against Elegies, The Center for Book Arts, (2001)
- Broken Symmetry. Wayne State University Press. 2006. ISBN 978-0-8143-3322-8.
- Losing Season. CavanKerry Press. 2009. ISBN 978-1-933880-15-0.
- Practicing to Walk Like a Heron. Wayne State University Press. 2013. ISBN 978-0-8143-3539-0.

=== Non-fiction ===
- Peter J. Schakel; Jack Ridl (1996). Approaching Poetry: Perspectives and Responses. St. Martin's Press. ISBN 978-0-312-13281-1.
- Peter Schakel; Jack Ridl (2004). Approaching Literature in the 21st Century: Fiction, Poetry, Drama. Bedford/St. Martin's. ISBN 978-0-312-40756-8.

=== Editor ===
- Peter Schakel; Jack Ridl, eds. (2002). 250 Poems: A Portable Anthology. Bedford/St. Martin's. ISBN 978-0-312-46616-9. (2nd edition 2008)
- Janet E. Gardner; Beverly Lawn; Jack Ridl; Peter Schakel, eds. (2004). Literature: A Portable Anthology. Bedford/St. Martin's. ISBN 978-0-312-46186-7. (2nd edition 2008)
- Michael Delp; Conrad Hilberry; Herbert Scott, eds. (1988). "A Father". Contemporary Michigan poetry: poems from the third coast. Photographer Michael Delp. Wayne State University Press. ISBN 978-0-8143-1924-6.
- Michael Delp; Conrad Hilberry; Josie Kearns, eds. (2000). "I Am Wearing Your Shirt". New poems from the third coast: contemporary Michigan poetry. Wayne State University Press. ISBN 978-0-8143-2797-5.
