= Irma Brandeis =

American scholar of Dante Alighieri (1905–1990)

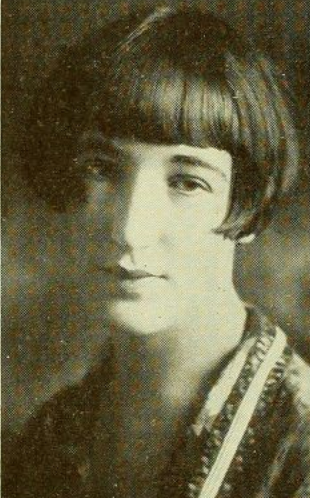
- Irma Brandeis, from the 1926 yearbook of Barnard College
- Born: 1905
- Died: 1990 (aged 84–85)
- Education: Barnard College
- Occupation: Dante scholar
- Employer: Bard College

Irma Brandeis (1905–1990) was an American scholar of Dante Alighieri. Her work The Ladder of Vision was acclaimed as a breakthrough in Dantean studies upon its publication in the 1960s.

Brandeis graduated from Barnard College in 1926. In her visits to Italy between 1933 and 1939 Brandeis became acquainted with the poet Eugenio Montale and was the inspiration for the metaphysical figure "Clizia" in his poetry, a coded senhal particularly prominent in his second book, Le Occasioni (The Occasions). The love story is narrated in Montale's posthumous book Lettere a Clizia (A. Mondadori, Milan 2006). Despite significant coverage in the literary press of the 1980s of her "Clizia" identity, Brandeis declined to clarify the nature of her relationship to Montale or discuss her possible significance in his work (particularly in poems she had helped translate).

Brandeis was also a close friend of the poet James Merrill, who funded in her memory the Irma Brandeis Professorship of Romance Cultures and Literature at Bard College (where Brandeis taught from 1944 until her semi-retirement in 1979). Merrill wrote in his 1993 memoir A Different Person about his unsuccessful efforts to encourage reconciliation between Brandeis and Montale late in life. In a memorial tribute to Brandeis (not published until 2004), Merrill wrote of contacting Brandeis through a Ouija board after her death, and finding her happily reunited "in a manner of speaking" with Montale.

United States Supreme Court Justice Louis Brandeis was the second cousin of Brandeis' father.
