= Raewyn Alexander =

New Zealand writer (born 1955)

Raewyn Alexander (born 1955) is a New Zealand writer. She has also worked in visual media, producing comics and clothing.

She was born in Hamilton, later moving to Auckland. Alexander was editor for the arts magazine Magazine. Her work has appeared in various literary magazines, in the Auckland Poetry Live anthology and in the anthology Essential New Zealand Poems: Facing the Empty Page.

In 2016 she had a lengthy essay published in Metro alleging she was engaged to Chris Knox. A spokesperson for Knox denied this, and Metro then retracted the story and apologised.

== Selected works ==
- Fat, novel (1996)
- Concrete, novel (1998)
- AUP New Poets 1, poetry (1998), Auckland University Press, ISBN 9781869401979
- Love and Hate are Small Words with Big Names, poetry (1999)
- Bacon is Not a Vegetable (701 Tips for Flatting), non-fiction, with Olwyn Stewart
- Sweet: A Guide for New Zealand Teenagers, non-fiction (2001), with Jan Hedge
- It's a Secret (Selected Poems 1993–2005), poetry chapbook (2005)
- Writing Poetry – fireworks, clay and architecture, non-fiction chapbook (2005)
- Museum of Lost Days, poetry (2008)
- Family of Artists, poetry (2012)
- Glam Rock Boyfriends, novel (2014), Brightspark Books, ISBN 0473266644
- Three Words: An anthology of Aotearoa / NZ Women's Comics, comics anthology, contributor, Beatnik (2016)
