= Jonathan Galassi =

American poet

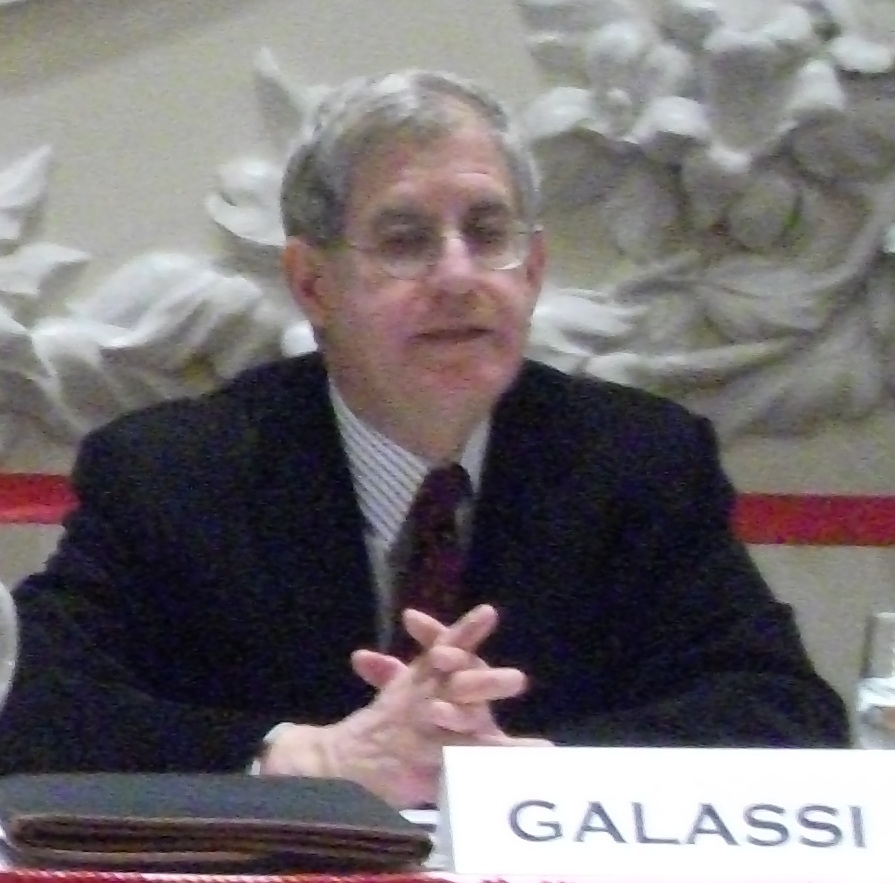
- Jonathan Galassi speaking at the Grand Ballroom of the New Yorker Hotel, 2011
- Born: 1949 (age 76–77); Seattle, Washington, U.S.
- Education: Harvard College; Christ's College, Cambridge
- Occupations: Chairman and Executive Editor Farrar, Straus and Giroux
- Employer: Farrar, Straus and Giroux
- Spouse: Susan Grace (divorced)

Jonathan Galassi (born 1949) has served as the president and publisher of Farrar, Straus and Giroux and is currently its chairman and executive editor.

== Early life ==
Galassi was born in Seattle (where his father worked as an attorney for the Justice Department) in 1949 but grew up in Plympton, Massachusetts. He attended Phillips Exeter Academy, where he became interested in poetry, writing and literature. He attended Harvard College, where he studied English under, among others, Robert Lowell and Elizabeth Bishop, and served as an editor of the Harvard Lampoon and the president of the Harvard Advocate. He graduated in 1971, then became a Marshall Scholar at Christ's College, Cambridge. He realized while attending Christ’s College that he wanted a career in book publishing.

== Career ==
Galassi began his publishing career as an editorial intern at Houghton Mifflin in Boston in 1973. He moved to Random House in New York, and then in 1986 to Farrar, Straus & Giroux (FSG), after being fired from Random House. Two years later, he was named editor-in-chief, and served as the president and publisher at FSG until 2018. He was succeeded as publisher by Mitzi Angel in 2018, and Angel was named president in 2021. Galassi is currently the chairman and executive editor.

Galassi is also a translator of poetry and a poet himself. He has translated and published the poetic works of the Italian poets Giacomo Leopardi and Eugenio Montale. His honors as a poet include a 1989 Guggenheim Fellowship, and his activities include having been poetry editor for The Paris Review for ten years, and being an honorary chairman of the Academy of American Poets. He has published poems in literary journals and magazines including Threepenny Review, The New Yorker, The Nation and the Poetry Foundation website.

He is also a trustee at his alma mater Exeter.

== Personal life ==
Galassi lives in Brooklyn. He was married to Susan Grace, with whom he has two daughters. The couple divorced in late 2011. He is gay. His brother is Peter Galassi.

== Bibliography ==
=== Poetry ===
==== Collections ====
- Morning Run: Poems (Lathan, NY: Paris Review Editions/British American Pub., 1988)
- North Street: Poems (New York: HarperCollins, 2000)
- Left-handed: Poems (New York: Knopf, 2012)
- The Vineyard: A Poem (New York, Knopf, 2026)

==== Translations ====
- The Second Life of Art: Selected Essays of Eugenio Montale (Ecco Press, 1982)
- Otherwise: Last and First Poems of Eugenio Montale (Vintage Books, 1984)
- Collected poems, 1920-1954: Eugenio Montale (Farrar, Straus & Giroux, 1998)
- A Boy Named Giotto by Paolo Guarnieri (pictures by Bimba Landmann; Farrar, Straus & Giroux, 1999)
- Selected Poems of Eugenio Montale (translated by Jonathan Galassi, Charles Wright, and David Young; edited with an introduction by David Young; Oberlin College Press, 2004)
- Canti by Giacomo Leopardi (translated and annotated by Jonathan Galassi; Farrar, Straus & Giroux, 2010)

==== List of poems ====
Title	Year	First published	Reprinted/collected
Orient epithalamion	2017	Galassi, Jonathan (January 2, 2017). "Orient epithalamion". The New Yorker. Vol. 92, no. 43. pp. 40–41.	The Vineyard: A Poem (New York, Knopf, 2026)

=== Novels ===
- Muse (New York: Knopf, 2015)
- School Days: a Novel (New York: Other Press, 2022)

== Sources ==
- Library of Congress Online Catalog > Jonathan Galassi
