= Davis McCombs =

American poet (born 1969)

Davis McCombs (born 1969) is an American poet. He attended Harvard University as an undergraduate, the University of Virginia as a Henry Hoyns Fellow, and Stanford University as a Wallace Stegner Fellow. He is also the recipient of fellowships from the Poetry Foundation, the Kentucky Arts Council, the National Endowment for the Arts and the Guggenheim Foundation. He is the Director of the Program in Creative Writing and Translation at the University of Arkansas. He has published three collections of poetry: Ultima Thule (Yale University Press, 2000); Dismal Rock (Tupelo Press, 2007); and Lore (University of Utah Press, 2016).

McCombs' work appeared in The Best American Poetry 1996, The Missouri Review, Poetry, The Kenyon Review, Virginia Quarterly Review, Hayden's Ferry Review, and other magazines and journals.

McCombs grew up in Munfordville, Kentucky. From 1991 to 2001, he worked as a Park Ranger at Mammoth Cave National Park. He is married to the poet and photographer Carolyn Guinzio.

== Awards ==
- 2005 Larry Levis Editor's Prize by The Missouri Review for a sixteen-part sequence of poems called "Tobacco Mosaic"
- 2005 Vachel Lindsay Poetry Award from Willow Springs for his poem "Rossetti in 1869"
- 2005 Joy Bale Boone award from Wind magazine's for a poem called "Noodling."
- 2005 Dorset Prize, chosen by Linda Gregerson
- 2015 Porter Prize

== Bibliography ==
=== Poetry collections ===
- Ultima Thule. Yale University Press. 2000. ISBN 978-0300083170.
- Dismal Rock. Tupelo Press. 2007. ISBN 978-1932195484.
- Lore. University of Utah Press. 2016. ISBN 978-1607814825.

=== List of poems ===
Title	Year	First published	Reprinted/collected
First hard freeze	2011	McCombs, Davis (Summer 2011). "First hard freeze". Indiana Review. 33 (1).	McCombs, Davis (2013). "First hard freeze". In Henderson, Bill (ed.). The Pushcart Prize XXXVII : best of the small presses 2013. Pushcart Press. p. 357.
Dumpster honey	2015	McCombs, Davis (August 3, 2015). "Dumpster honey". The New Yorker. Vol. 91, no. 22. p. 26.	
