= Ánchel Conte =

Spanish poet and historian (1942–2023)

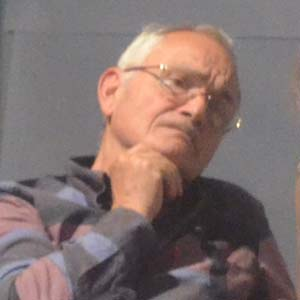
- Conte in 2012
- Born: Ánchel Conte Cazcarro; 15 October 1942; Alcolea de Cinca, Spain
- Died: 23 November 2023 (aged 81); Almería, Spain
- Occupations: Poet; Historian
- Political party: PCE

Ánchel Conte Cazcarro (15 October 1942 – 23 November 2023) was a Spanish poet and historian of the Aragonese language.

== Biography ==
Born in Alcolea de Cinca on 15 October 1942, Conte held a doctorate in history and taught secondary school until his retirement in 2003. Active during the Francoist regime, he joined the Communist Party of Spain in Teruel. He was one of the founders of Andalán magazine and of the Consello d'a Fabla Aragonesa. He also created a collection of folklore from Sobrarbe and co-founded the folkloric group Viello Sobrarbe.

Ánchel Conte died in Almería on 22 November 2023, at the age of 81.

== Publications ==
=== Poetry ===
- No deixez morir a mía voz (1972)
- O tiempo y os días (1996)
- E zaga o mar o desierto (2002)
- Luna que no ye luna / luna que no es luna (2014)

=== Stories ===
- O rafe d'o espiello (1997)
- De ordo sacerdotalis (2004)

=== Novels ===
- O bolito d'as sisellas (2000)
- Aguardando lo zierzo (2002)
