= Vanessa K. Valdés =

American novelist

Dr. Vanessa K. Valdés
- Education: Ph.D. Vanderbilt University in Spanish and Portuguese, B.A. Yale University in English
- Occupations: Professor of Spanish and Portuguese; author; historian

Dr. Vanessa K. Valdés is an American author, educator, writer, editor, and historian. For seventeen years, she was a professor of Spanish and Portuguese at the City University of New York. She is a Puerto Rican of African descent. She is the author of three books, including Diasporic Blackness: The Life and Times of Arturo Alfonso Schomburg (2017). Schomburg was one of the founding fathers of Black History in North America, and the father of the Global African Diaspora. She has also written Oshun's Daughters: The Search for Womanhood in the Americas (2014). In Oshun's Daughters she examines African Diasporic sense of womanhood, examining novels, poems, etc., written by Diaspora women from the United States, the Caribbean, and Brazil. Writings that show how these women use traditional Yoruba religion as alternative models for their womanhood differing from western concepts of being a woman. With David Pullins, she is the co-author of Juan de Pareja, Afro-Hispanic Painter in the Age of Velázquez (2023), which accompanied its exhibition at The Metropolitan Museum of Art from March 27 - July 16, 2023.

She is the editor of Let Spirit Speak, Cultural Journeys through the African Diaspora (2012); The Future is Now: A New Look at African Diaspora Studies (2012); Racialized Visions: Haiti and the Hispanic Caribbean (2020); and Machado de Assis, Blackness, and the Americas (2024).

She is the series editor of Afro-Latinx Futures series at the State University of New York Press, and with Annette Joseph-Gabriel and Nathan Dize, the series co-editor of Global Black Voices in Translation at Vanderbilt University Press.

Her articles have appeared in various journals such as; Chasqui, Hispania, MELUS Journal, CLA Journal, Callaloo, and The Journal (PALARA).

Her research is in comparative studies in literature of the Americans and particularly the Afro-Hispanic, African-American, Spanish Caribbean, U.S. Latina/Latino, and history of Puerto Rico.

== Early life ==
Vanessa says that her passion for reading started at an early age from her parents. She would imitate her father, and that her New York city apartment was filled with books and encyclopedias. Her undergraduate degree in English taught her the works of Chaucer, Donne, Milton, and Shakespeare. She later became exposed to the writings of Zora Neal Hurston, Richard Wright, Toni Morrison, and Langston Hughes.

While in college her last year in college she was exposed to 'Down These Mean Streets', that was written by Piri Thomas. She says that this book changed her life.

== Career ==
2013 - A panelist for the 20th anniversary of Africana Studies at Barnard College, the Africana Studies Program, the Consortium for Critical Interdisciplinary Studies, and the Barnard Center for Research on Women. The two day conference was called The Worlds of Shange Conference. The featured panelist were Farah Griffin, Alexis Pauline Gumbs, Jennifer DeVere Brody, and the moderator was Monica L. Miller. The conference was a discussion about the works of Ntozake Shange's work.

Books by Vanessa K. Valdes

- 2017 - Diasporic Blackness: The Life and Times of Arturo Alfonso Schomburg published by SUNY Press. She examines the life of Black Puerto Rican born scholar Arturo Alfonso Schomburg. Who was born in 1874 and died in 1938. Schomburg is known for his collection and research of African Diaspora history. His personal library became the basis for the Schomburg Center in New York City in Harlem.
- 2014 - Oshun's Daughters: The Search for Womanhood in the Americas, published by SUNY Press
- 2012 - The Future is Now: A New Look at African Diaspora Studies, published by Cambridge Scholars Publishing
- 2012 - Let Spirit Speak! Cultural Journeys through the African Diaspora published by SUNY Press
