= Bassam Hajjar =

Lebanese poet, translator, literary critic (1955-2009)

- Born: January 1, 1955; Tyre, Lebanon
- Died: February 17, 2009 (aged 54)
- Resting place: Sidon, Lebanon
- Education: Lebanese University
- Occupations: Poet, translator, literary critic

Bassam Hajjar ((January 1, 1955 – February 17, 2009) was a Lebanese translator, poet, and literary critic. His works include Preoccupations of a Calm Man (1980) and he translated the works of Jacques Derrida among others. He was also a contributor to Al-Mustaqbal, a weekly newspaper.

For literary scholar Huda Fakhreddine, his prose poem "becomes a reader-ly text" and "an exercise in creative reading."
