= Eugenio Montale =

Italian writer (1896–1981)

Senator for life Eugenio Montale
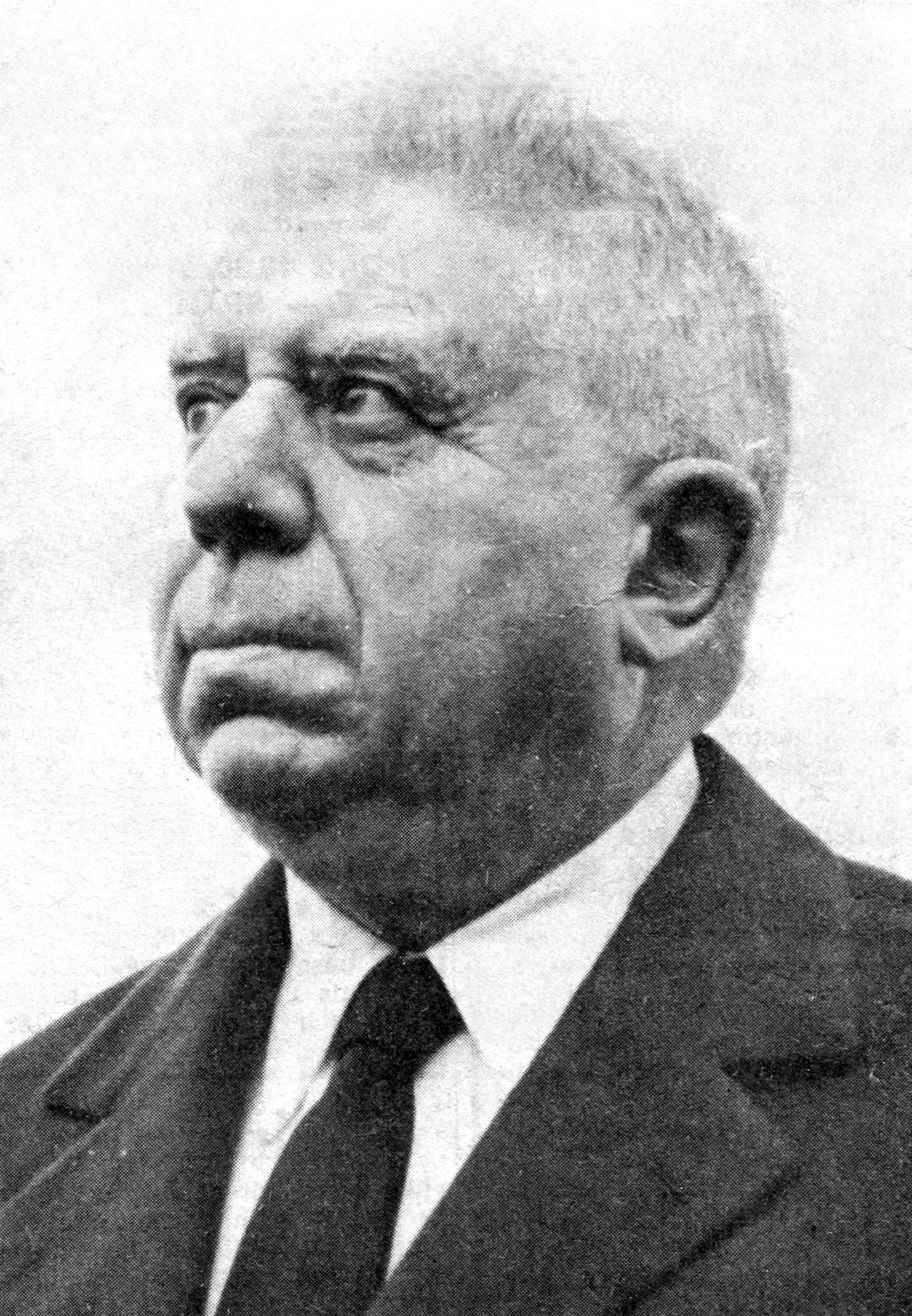

Member of the Senate of the Republic
- Life tenure 13 June 1967 – 12 September 1981
- President: Giuseppe Saragat

Personal details
- Born: 12 October 1896 Genoa, Kingdom of Italy
- Died: 12 September 1981 (aged 84) Milan, Italy
- Party: Action Party (1945–1947); Independent (1963–1972; 1976–1977); Italian Liberal Party (1972–1976); Italian Republican Party (1977–1981)
- Profession: Poet, writer, editor, translator, politician
- Writing career
- Years active: 1920–1981
- Notable awards: 1975 Nobel Prize in Literature
- Movement: Hermeticism

Signature
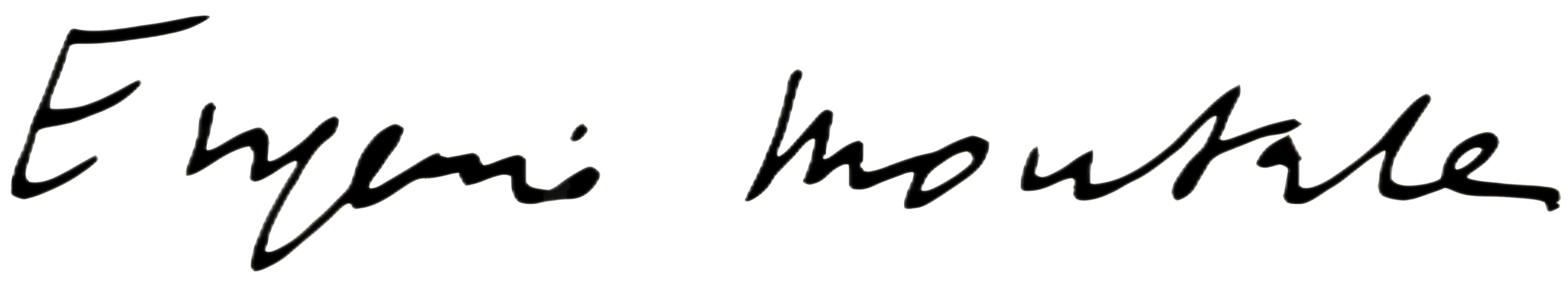

Eugenio Montale (Italian: [euˈdʒɛːnjo monˈtaːle]; 12 October 1896 – 12 September 1981) was an Italian poet, prose writer, editor and translator. In 1975, he was awarded the Nobel Prize in Literature "for his distinctive poetry which, with great artistic sensitivity, has interpreted human values under the sign of an outlook on life with no illusions."

== Life and works ==
=== Early years ===
Montale was born in Genoa, the son of Giuseppina Ricci and Domenico Montale, a businessman who ran a chemical products company. Montale was the youngest of six children, including five brothers and a sister.

Montale attended elementary school in Genoa. The Montale family spent their summers at their villa in Monterosso al Mare, and the landscapes of the Ligurian region would go on to inspire his poetry. In 1911, he was enrolled at a technical college and graduated with a diploma in accountancy in 1915. In the same year, he began taking music lessons with baritone Ernesto Sivori. However, his time as an infantryman in World War I and the death of Sivori in 1923 caused him to abandon his career in music and turn to poetry instead.

Montale was largely self-taught. Growing up, his imagination was caught by several writers, including Dante Alighieri, and by the study of foreign languages (especially English).

=== Poetic works ===
Montale wrote more than ten anthologies of short lyrics, a journal of poetry translation, plus several books of prose translations, two books of literary criticism, and one of fantasy prose. Alongside his imaginative work he was a constant contributor to Italy's most important newspaper, the Corriere della Sera, for which he wrote a huge number of articles on literature, music, and art. He also wrote a foreword to Dante's "The Divine Comedy", in which he mentions the credibility of Dante, and his insight and unbiased imagination. In 1925 he was a signatory to the Manifesto of the Anti-Fascist Intellectuals. Montale's own politics inclined toward the liberalism of Piero Gobetti and Benedetto Croce. He contributed to Gobetti's literary magazine Il Baretti.

Montale's work, especially his first poetry collection Ossi di seppia ("Cuttlefish Bones"), which appeared in 1925, shows him as an antifascist who felt detached from contemporary life and found solace and refuge in the solitude of nature.

=== Anticonformism of the new poetry ===
Montale moved to Florence in 1927 to work as an editor for the publisher Bemporad. Florence was the cradle of Italian poetry of that age, with works like the Canti orfici by Dino Campana (1914) and the first lyrics by Ungaretti for the review Lacerba. Other poets like Umberto Saba and Vincenzo Cardarelli had been highly praised. In 1929 Montale was asked to be chairman of the Gabinetto Vieusseux Library, a post from which he was expelled in 1938 by the fascist government. By this time Montale's poetry was a reaction against the literary style of the fascist regime. He collaborated with the magazine Solaria, and (starting in 1927) frequented the literary café Le Giubbe Rosse ("Red Jackets") on the Piazza Vittoria (now Piazza della Repubblica). Visiting the café often several times a day, he became a central figure among a group of writers there, including Carlo Emilio Gadda, Arturo Loria and Elio Vittorini (all founders of the magazine). He wrote for almost all the important literary magazines of the time.

Though hindered by financial problems and the literary and social conformism imposed by the authorities, in Florence, Montale published his finest anthology, Le occasioni ("Occasions", 1939). From 1933 to 1938 he had a love relationship with Irma Brandeis, a Jewish-American scholar of Dante who occasionally visited Italy for short periods. After falling in love with Brandeis, Montale represented her as a mediatrix figure like Dante's Beatrice. Le occasioni contains numerous allusions to Brandeis, here called Clizia (a senhal). Franco Fortini judged Montale's Ossi di seppia and Le occasioni the high-water mark of 20th century Italian poetry.

T.S. Eliot, who shared Montale's admiration for Dante, was an important influence on his poetry at this time; in fact, the new poems of Eliot were shown to Montale by Mario Praz, then teaching in Manchester. The concept of the objective correlative used by Montale in his poetry, was probably influenced by T. S. Eliot. In 1948, for Eliot's sixtieth birthday, Montale contributed a celebratory essay titled "Eliot and Ourselves" to a collection published to mark the occasion.

=== Disharmony with the world ===
From 1948 to his death, Montale lived in Milan. After the war, he was a member of the liberal Partito d'Azione. As a contributor to the Corriere della Sera he was music editor and also reported from abroad, including Israel, where he went as a reporter to follow Pope Paul VI's visit there. His works as a journalist are collected in Fuori di casa ("Out of Home", 1969).

La bufera e altro ("The Storm and Other Things") was published in 1956 and marks the end of Montale's most acclaimed poetry. Here his figure Clizia is joined by La Volpe ("the Fox"), based on the young poet Maria Luisa Spaziani with whom Montale had an affair during the 1950s. However, this volume also features Clizia, treated in a variety of poems as a kind of bird-goddess who defies Hitler. These are some of his greatest poems.

His later works are Xenia (1966), Satura (1971) and Diario del '71 e del '72 (1973). Montale's later poetry is wry and ironic, musing on the critical reaction to his earlier work and on the constantly changing world around him. Satura contains a poignant elegy to his wife Drusilla Tanzi. He also wrote a series of poignant poems about Clizia shortly before his death. Montale's fame at that point had extended throughout the world. He had received honorary degrees from the Universities of Milan (1961), Cambridge (1967), Rome (1974), and had been named Senator-for-Life in the Italian Senate. In 1973 he was awarded the Golden Wreath of the Struga Poetry Evenings in Struga, SR Macedonia. In 1975 he received the Nobel Prize for Literature.

Montale died in Milan in 1981.

In 1996, a work appeared called Posthumous Diary (Diario postumo) that purported to have been 'compiled' by Montale before his death, with the help of the young poet Annalisa Cima; the critic Dante Isella thinks that this work is not authentic. Joseph Brodsky dedicated his essay "In the Shadow of Dante" to Eugenio Montale's lyric poetry.

== List of works ==
Each year links to its corresponding "[year] in literature" or "[year] in poetry" article:

- 1925: Ossi di seppia ("Cuttlefish Bones"), first edition; second edition, 1928, with six new poems and an introduction by Alfredo Gargiulo; third edition, 1931, Lanciano: Carabba
- 1932: La casa dei doganieri e altre poesie, a chapbook of five poems published in association with the award of the Premio del Antico Fattore to Montale; Florence: Vallecchi
- 1939: Le occasioni ("The Occasions"), Turin: Einaudi
- 1943: Finisterre, a chapbook of poetry, smuggled into Switzerland by Gianfranco Contini; Lugano: the Collana di Lugano (24 June); second edition, 1945, Florence: Barbèra
- 1948: Quaderno di traduzioni, translations, Milan: Edizioni della Meridiana
- 1948: La fiera letteraria poetry criticism
- 1956: La bufera e altro ("The Storm and Other Things"), a first edition of 1,000 copies, Venice: Neri Pozza; second, larger edition published in 1957, Milan: Arnaldo Mondadore Editore
- 1956: Farfalla di Dinard, stories, a private edition
- 1962: Satura, poetry, published in a private edition, Verona: Oficina Bodoni
- 1962: Accordi e pastelli ("Agreements and Pastels"), Milan: Scheiwiller (May)
- 1966: Il colpevole
- 1966: Auto da fé: Cronache in due tempi, cultural criticism, Milan: Il Saggiatore
- 1966: Xenia, poems in memory of Mosca, first published in a private edition of 50
- 1969: Fuori di casa, collected travel writing
- 1971: Satura (1962–1970) (January)
- 1971: La poesia non esiste, prose; Milan: Scheiwiller (February)
- 1973: Diario del '71 e del '72, Milan: Arnoldo Mondadori Editore (a private edition of 100 copies was published in 1971)
- 1973: Trentadue variazioni, an edition of 250 copies, Milan: Giorgio Lucini
- 1977: Quaderno di quattro anni, Milan: Mondadori
- 1977: Tutte le poesie, Milan: Mondadori
- 1980: L'opera in versi, the Bettarini-Contini edition; published in 1981 as Altri verse e poesie disperse, publisher: Mondadori

Translated in Montale's lifetime

- 1966: Ossi di seppia, Le occasioni, and La bufera e altro, translated by Patrice Angelini into French; Paris: Gallimard
- 1978: The Storm & Other Poems, translated by Charles Wright into English (Oberlin College Press), ISBN 0-932440-01-0

Posthumous

- 1981: Prime alla Scala, music criticism, edited by Gianfranca Lavezzi; Milan: Mondadori
- 1981: Lettere a Quasimodo, edited by Sebastiano Grasso; publisher: Bompiani
- 1982: The Second Life of Art: Selected Essays, trans. Jonathan Galassi (Ecco), ISBN 0-912946-84-9
- 1983: Quaderno genovese, edited by Laura Barile; a journal from 1917, first published this year; Milan: Mondadori
- 1987: Trans. William Arrowsmith, The Occasions (Norton, New York & London).
- 1990: The Coastguard's House / La casa dei doganieri : Selected Poems (Bloodaxe Books, Newcastle-upon-Tyne).
- 1991: Tutte le poesie, edited by Giorgio Zampa. Jonathan Galassi calls this book the "most comprehensive edition of Montale's poems".
- 1996: Diario postumo: 66 poesie e altre, edited by Annalisa Cima; Milan: Mondadori
- 1996: Il secondo mestiere: Arte, musica, società and Il secondo mestierre: Prose 1929–1979, a two-volume edition including all of Montale's published writings; edited by Giorgio Zampa; Milan: Mondadori
- 1998: Satura : 1962–1970 / trans. with notes, by William Arrowsmith (New York, Norton).
- 1999: Collected Poems, trans. Jonathan Galassi (Carcanet) (Oxford-Weidenfeld Translation Prize)
- 2004: Selected Poems, trans. Jonathan Galassi, Charles Wright, & David Young (Oberlin College Press), ISBN 0-932440-98-3
- 2016: Xenia (Arc Publications). pbk: ISBN 978-1-910345-53-5; hbk: ISBN 978-1-910345-54-2; e-book: ISBN 978-1-910345-55-9. Bilingual version, translated by Mario Petrucci, winner of the 2016 PEN Translates Award, shortlisted for 2018 John Florio Prize.
- 2017: Montale's Essential: The Poems of Eugenio Montale in English, translated by Alessandro Baruffi (Literary Joint Press), ISBN 978-1-387-21585-0

== See also ==
- Raffaello Baldini – poet who was inspired by Montale
- Tonino Guerra – poet and screenwriter who was inspired by Montale
