= Ingrid de Kok =

South African author and poet

- Born: 1951 (age 74–75)
- Other name: Ingrid Fiske
- Occupations: Author and poet
- Notable work: "Women and children first"

Ingrid de Kok aka Ingrid Fiske (born 1951) is a South African author and poet.

== Biography ==
Ingrid de Kok grew up in Stilfontein, a gold-mining town in what was then the Western Transvaal. When she was 12 years old, her parents moved to Johannesburg. In 1977, she emigrated to Canada, where she lived until returning to South Africa in 1984. She has one child, a son. Her partner was the university lecturer, activist and literary and art critic Tony Morphet, who died in 2021.

De Kok is a fellow of the University of Cape Town, an Associate Professor in Extra-Mural Studies, and part of a team of two that designs and administers the public non-formal educational curriculum that constitutes the Extra-Mural Programmes at the University of Cape Town.

She is well known for the poem "Women and children first", which examines the vulnerable position of these two groups in a patriarchal society. De Kok has co-ordinated school and public programmes devoted to the development of a reading culture. She is a member of PEN South Africa and a trustee of the Buchu Publishing Project. She was a member of the committee of the National Arts Festival in Makhanda, with responsibility for convening the Winter School from 2000 to 2005, and is currently on the National Arts Council Literary Advisory Committee. She is the chair of the South African Association of Canadian Studies.

Between 1977 and 2006, de Kok's poems were published in numerous South African literary journals, including Upstream, Sesame, Staffrider, Contrast, New Contrast, New Coin and Carapace. Occasionally poems have also appeared, translated into Afrikaans, in various South African Afrikaans newspapers.

== Works ==
- Familiar Ground, Johannesburg: Ravan Press, 1988, ISBN 978-0869753262.
- Transfer, Cape Town: Snail Press, 1997, ISBN 978-1874923428.
- Terrestrial Things, Cape Town: Kwela/SnailPress, 2002, ISBN 978-0795701467.
- Seasonal Fires: Selected and New Poems, NYC: Seven Stories Press, 2006, ISBN 978-1583227183.
- Seasonal Fires: Selected and New Poems, South Africa: Umuzi, Random House, 2006, ISBN 978-1415200186.
- Mappe del corpo, A cura di Paola Splendore. Rome: Donzelli Poesia, 2008, ISBN 978-8860362308.
