= Karen Volkman =

American poet (born 1967)

- Born: 1967 (age 58–59); Miami Beach, Florida, U.S.

Academic background
- Education: New College of Florida; Syracuse University alumni University of Houston

Karen Volkman (born January 1967, in Miami Beach, Florida) is an American poet.

== Life ==
She was educated at New College of Florida, Syracuse University, and the University of Houston.

Her poems have appeared in anthologies including The Best American Poetry, and The Pushcart Prize XXVII.

She has taught at several universities, including the University of Alabama, University of Pittsburgh, University of Chicago, and Columbia College Chicago. She currently lives in Missoula, and teaches in the MFA writing program at the University of Montana-Missoula.

== Awards ==
- Spar, winner of the James Laughlin Award and the Iowa Poetry Prize
- Crash's Law, selected for the National Poetry Series by Heather McHugh.

== Work ==
=== Poetry books ===
- Whereso. BOA Editions. 2016. ISBN 978-1-942683-08-7.
- Nomina. BOA Editions. 2008. ISBN 978-1-934414-06-4.
- Spar. University of Iowa Press. 2002. ISBN 978-0-87745-807-4. "Karen Volkman."
- Crash's Law. Norton. 1996. ISBN 978-0-393-31722-0.

=== Essays ===
- Mutable Boundaries: on Prose Poetry.
