= Henry Hart (author) =

Biographer and 17th Virginia Poet Laureate (born 1954)

- Born: 1954 (age 71–72)
- Occupations: professor and writer
- Title: 17th Poet Laureate of Virginia
- Awards: Carole Weinstein Prize for Poetry

Academic work
- Institutions: College of William & Mary
- Notable works: Verse

Henry Hart (born 1954) is the Hickman Professor of Humanities at the College of William & Mary in Williamsburg, Virginia. In addition to three books of poetry — The Ghost Ship (1990), The Rooster Mask (1998), and Background Radiation (2007) — he has written critical works on such poets as Seamus Heaney, Geoffrey Hill, and Robert Lowell.

He edited The James Dickey Reader (1999), and his biography James Dickey: The World as a Lie (2000) was a finalist in nonfiction for the Southern Book Critics Circle Award. He also edited The Wadsworth Themes in American Literature Series (2009). His poems and essays have appeared in The New Yorker, Poetry, The Kenyon Review, The Southern Review, The Sewanee Review, Denver Quarterly, and numerous other journals.

Hart was a founding editor of Verse, an international poetry journal active 1984–2018. In 2010, he won the Carole Weinstein Prize for Poetry. On July 2, 2018, he was sworn in as the 17th Poet Laureate of Virginia in the commonwealth's capital of Richmond.

== Bibliography ==
=== Poetry ===
- The Ghost Ship (1990)
- The Rooster Mask (1998)
- Background Radiation (2007)
- "Familiar Ghosts" (2014)

=== Books and biographies ===
- "The Poetry of Geoffrey Hill" (1986)
- "Seamus Heaney: Poet of Contrary Progressions" (1992)
- "Robert Lowell and the Sublime" (1995)
- "The James Dickey Reader" (1999)
- James Dickey: The World as a Lie (2000)
- "The Life of Robert Frost: A Critical Biography" (2017)
