= Nancy Eimers =

American poet

Nancy Eimers (born 1954 Chicago) is an American poet.

== Life ==
She graduated from Indiana University with an M.A., from the University of Arizona with an M.F.A., and from the University of Houston with a Ph.D. She teaches at Western Michigan University. She is also a contributing editor at The Alaska Quarterly Review.

Her work has appeared in Paris Review, TriQuarterly, Field, The Nation, Antioch Review, North American Review, Poetry Northwest, Dunes Review.

She lives in Kalamazoo, Michigan.

== Awards ==
- 1987 Nation “Discovery” Award
- 1989, 1996 Two National Endowment for the Arts Creative Writing Fellowships
- 1997 Verna Emery Prize, for No Moon
- 1998 Whiting Award

== Works ==
- "AFTERLIVES"; "SEPTEMBER RAIN", Bucknell
- A Grammar to Waking. Carnegie Mellon University Press. 2006. ISBN 978-0-88748-447-6.
- No Moon. Purdue University Press. 1997. ISBN 978-1-55753-099-8.
- Destroying Angel. Wesleyan/University Press of New England. 1991. ISBN 978-0-8195-2194-1. "Nancy Eimers."
- Stars too small to receive us: poems. University of Houston. 1988.
- Woman with a mango. Indiana University. 1979.

=== Anthologies ===
- William J. Walsh, ed. (2006). "A Grammar of Waking". Under the rock umbrella: contemporary American poets, 1951-1977. Mercer University Press. ISBN 978-0-88146-047-6.
- Susan Aizenberg; Erin Belieu; Jeremy Countryman, eds. (2001). "Morbid". The Extraordinary Tide: New Poetry By American Women. Columbia University Press. ISBN 978-0-231-11963-4.
- Roger Weingarten; Richard Higgerson, eds. (2001). Poets of the New Century. David R. Godine Publisher. ISBN 978-1-56792-177-9.
- Michael Collier; Stanley Plumly, eds. (1999). "Arlington Street". The New Bread Loaf Anthology of Contemporary American Poetry. UPNE. ISBN 978-0-87451-950-1.
- Adrienne Rich; David Lehman, eds. (1996). Best American Poetry 1996. Scribner. ISBN 978-0-684-81455-1.
