= Rosemary Catacalos =

American poet (1944–2022)

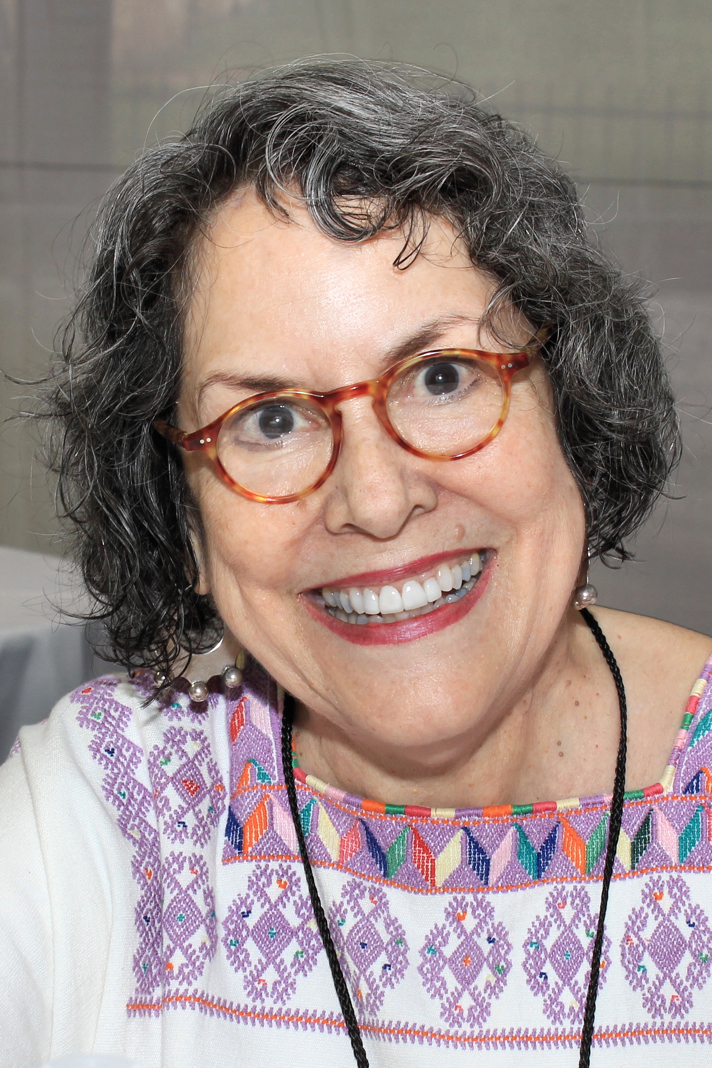
Catacalos at the 2016 Texas Book Festival

Rosemary Catacalos (1944 – June 17, 2022) was the 2013–2014 Texas Poet Laureate. A writer of Mexican and Greek ancestry, Catacalos was the first Latina named to the State post.

== Early life ==
Catacalos was born in 1944 in St. Petersburg, Florida, during World War II to parents from San Antonio, Texas. She returned to San Antonio when she was three years old, where she spent most of her childhood on the east side. Catacalos was of Greek and Mexican heritage, and was known for blending the history, folklore and mythologies of those cultures into her carefully crafted poems, which often feature closely observed San Antonio settings. Catacalos was included in the award-winning documentary The Children of the Revolución.

== Career ==
In the 1960s, Catacalos worked as a reporter and arts columnist for the San Antonio Light newspaper. She was an early advocate for and participant in the artist-in-the-schools programs, building a legacy that lived on for decades after.

Catacalos spent 1989 to 2003 in California, where she was first a Stegner Creative Writing Fellow at Stanford University, then executive director of The Poetry Center/American Poetry Archives at San Francisco State University (1991–1996). She was a visiting scholar at the Institute for Research on Women and Gender at Stanford until she returned to San Antonio in 2003 to become the executive director of Gemini Ink, a literary arts center. She retired from Gemini Ink in 2012.

== Death ==
Catacalos died on June 17, 2022, in San Antonio.

== Published works ==
In 1984 Catacalos' first book, As Long As It Takes, a letterpress chapbook, as well as her first full-length collection, Again for the First Time, were published.

Again for the First Time

Catacalos' first full-length collection received the 1985 Texas Institute of Letters poetry prize. It was also reissued in 2013 on its 30th anniversary.

Her poems were widely published in high school and college textbooks, among other venues. Her work was twice collected in the annual Best American Poetry anthology and earned fellowships from the National Endowment for the Arts, the Stegner Fellowship Program at Stanford University, and the Paisano Fellowship of the Texas Institute of Letters/University of Texas at Austin. Her literary works were also featured in numerous literary magazines, including Southwest Review, The Progressive and Parnassus: Poetry in Review. She received several Pushcart Prize nominations, and received a Special Mention in Pushcart Prize IX: Best of the Small Presses.

According to literary critics, Catacalos' work was "informed by mythology in ways that seem at odds with standard poetic practice today. These influences operate not as inert showpieces, but as live observations on the nature of time and mortality, emphasizing the spiritual ecstasy inherent in ordinary experience."

Many of Catacalos' poems deconstruct women's labor in a way that makes them have almost a spiritual quality.
