= Alma Luz Villanueva =

American poet

- Born: October 4, 1944 (age 82); Lompoc, California, U.S.

Academic work
- Discipline: Creative writing
- Institutions: Antioch University; University of California Santa Cruz; Cabrillo College; Naropa Institute, Mesa College; University of California, San Diego; Stanford University; Pacific University

Alma Luz Villanueva (born October 4, 1944 in Lompoc, California) is an American poet, short story writer, and novelist.

== Life ==
Her Mexican grandfather edited a newspaper in Hermosillo, Mexico, and was a published poet. Her maternal grandmother, a Yaqui Indian curandera/healer (as was her mother) from Sonora, raised her in the Mission District of San Francisco.

She taught at University of California Santa Cruz, Cabrillo College, Naropa Institute, Mesa College, University of California, San Diego, Stanford University, Pacific University, and Antioch University Los Angeles. She lives in San Miguel de Allende, Mexico.

== Awards ==
- 1989 American Book Award for the novel The Ultraviolet Sky
- PEN Oakland fiction award, 1994, for the novel Naked Ladies
- Latino Literature Prize, New York, 1994, for poetry, Planet
- The Best American Poetry, 1996, for poem, “Crazy Courage”
- 1976-1977 Chicano/Latino Literary Prize

== Works ==
- Song of the Golden Scorpion. Wings Press. 2013. ISBN 978-1-60940-346-1
- Soft Chaos. Bilingual Press/Editorial Bilingüe. 2009. ISBN 978-1-931010-37-5.
- Luna's California Poppies. Bilingual Press/Editorial Bilingüe. 2002. ISBN 978-0-927534-99-4.
- Vida, poetry. Wings Press. May 2002. ISBN 978-0-930324-66-7.
- Desire. Bilingual Review Press. September 1998. ISBN 978-0-927534-76-5.
- Weeping Woman: La Llorona and Other Stories. Bilingual Press. 1994. ISBN 978-0-927534-38-3.
- Naked Ladies. Bilingual Review Press. January 1994. ISBN 978-0-927534-30-7.
- Planet with Mother, May I?. Bilingual Review Press. July 1993. ISBN 978-0-927534-17-8.
- The Ultraviolet Sky, republished with Doubleday, 1993. ISBN 0-385-42014-5
- The Ultraviolet Sky. Bilingual Review Press. June 1988. ISBN 978-0-916950-85-9.
- Life Span (Place of Herons Press, 1985)
- Blood Root (Blue Heron Press, 1977)

=== Anthologies ===
- Terry Beers, ed (2012). "Califlora, A Literary Field Guide." Excerpt from novel, "Luna's California Poppies." Heyday Books. ISBN 978-1-59714-161-1
- Robert Shapart, James Thomas, Ray Gonzalez, eds (2010). "Sudden Fiction Latino." Short story, from book, "Weeping Woman, La Llorona," "People of the Dog." W.W. Norton. ISBN 978-0-393-33645-0
- J. Sterling Warner, Judith Hillard, eds (2009). "Visions Across the Americas: Short Essays for Composition." Wadsworth Press. ISBN 978-1428263772
- Jose Gurpegui, ed (2009). Camino Real. Universidad de Alcala- Madrid, Spain. ISSN 1889-5611
- "Pembroke Magazine, Number 40" (University of North Carolina, 2008)
- Mary Frosch, ed. (2008). Coming of Age In The 21st Century. New Press. ISBN 978-1-59558-055-9. Story from "Weeping Woman, La Llorona."
- Stephanie Fetta, ed. (2008). "To Jesus Villanueva, with Love; I Was a Skinny Tomboy Kid; There Were Times". The Chicano/Latino literary prize: an anthology of prize-winning fiction, poetry, and drama. Arte Publico Press. ISBN 978-1-55885-511-3.
- Cris K A DiMarco, ed. (2007). Solamente en San Miguel. Windstorm Creative. ISBN 978-1-59092-691-8.
- Susan Koppelman, ed (2003). Between Mothers and Daughters: Stories Across Generations. The Feminist Press. ISBN 978-1-55861-459-8
- J. Excerpt from novel, "Naked Ladies". H. Blair, ed. (2002). Caliente: The Best Erotic Writing in Latin American Fiction. Berkley Books. ISBN 978-0-425-18466-0.
- Rick Heide, ed. (2002). "La Llorana / Weeping Woman". Under the fifth sun: Latino literature from California. Heyday Books. p. 481. ISBN 978-1-890771-59-1. "Alma Luz Villanueva."
- Constance Warloe, ed. (May 1, 2001). From Daughters and Sons To Fathers. Story Line Press. ISBN 978-1-58654-003-6.
- Neil Philip, ed. (2001). It's a Woman's World: A Century of Women's Voices in Poetry. Dutton. ISBN 9780525463283.
- Lauri Umansky; Michelle Plott, eds. (2000). "Blood Ties". Making Sense of Women's Lives: An Introduction to Women's Studies. Rowman & Littlefield. ISBN 978-0-939693-53-5.
- Elizabeth Roberts; Elias Amidon, eds. (1999). Prayers For A Thousand years. HarperSanFrancisco. ISBN 978-0-06-066875-4.
- Burleigh Muten, ed (1999). Her Words: Anthology of Poetry About The Great Goddess. Shambhala. ISBN 978-1-57062-473-5
- Manuel de Jesús Hernández-Gutiérrez; David William Foster, eds. (1997). "Trust". Literatura chicana, 1965-1995: an anthology in Spanish, English, and Caló. Taylor & Francis. ISBN 978-0-8153-2077-7.
- Burleigh Muten, ed (1997). Return of The Great Goddess. Stewart, Tabori, Chang. ISBN 978-1556706080
- Constance Warloe, ed. (1997). I've Always Meant To Tell You, Letters To Our Mothers. Pocket Books. ISBN 978-0-671-56324-0.
- Adrienne Rich; David Lehman, eds. (1996). The Best American Poetry 1996. Scribner. ISBN 978-0-684-81455-1.
- Lillian Castillo-Speed, ed. (1995). Latina: Women's Voices from the Borderlands. New York: Touchstone Press. ISBN 978-0-684-80240-4.
- Roberta Fernández, ed. (1994). "An Act of creation; Trust; Indian Summer Ritual". In other words: literature by Latinas of the United States. Arte Publico Press. p. 247. ISBN 978-1-55885-110-8. "Alma Luz Villanueva."
- Erica Bauermeister; Jesse Larsen; Holly Smith (1994). 500 Great Books by Women. Penguin Books. ISBN 978-0-14-017590-5.
- Annie Finch, ed. (1994). A Formal Feeling Comes. Story Line Press. ISBN 978-0-934257-98-5.
- Unsettling America. Penguin Books. 1994. ISBN 978-0-670-85170-6. (reprint 2008)
- Ray González, ed. (1992). Mirrors Beneath The Earth. Curbstone Press. ISBN 978-1-880684-02-3.
- Janine Canan, ed (1989). She Rises Like The Sun: Invocations of the Goddess by Contemporary American Women. Crossing Press. ISBN 978-0-89594-353-8
- Alfonso Rodríguez; Santiago Daydí-Tolson, eds. (1985). Five Poets of Aztlan, Epic poem, "La Chingada.". Bilingual Press. ISBN 978-0-916950-41-5.
- Florence Howe; Ellen Bass, eds. (1973). No More Masks!. Garden City, N.Y., Anchor Press. ISBN 978-0-385-02553-9. (reprint HarperPerennial, August 1993, ISBN 0-06-096517-7)
