= Carolyn Lei-Lanilau =

American poet (born 1946)

- Carolyn Leilani Yu Zhen Lau
- Born: 1946 (age 79–80); Honolulu, Hawaii, U.S.
- Education: San Francisco State University (MA)
- Writing career
- Language: English, Hawaiian, Hakka, Hawaiian, French, Latin,
- Notable works: Ono Ono Girl's Hula; Wode Shuofa: My Way of Speaking

Carolyn Leilani Yu Zhen Lau (a.k.a. Carolyn Lau) (born 1946 Honolulu, Hawaii) is an American poet.

== Biography ==
Lei-Lanilau is Hawaiian of Hakka ancestry.

She graduated from San Francisco State University with an M.A. in English. She also studied Chinese philosophy. She is an educator who teaches poetry and movement to bilingual Chinese and Southeast Asian immigrant children.

Her work appeared in The Bloomsbury Review, The American Poetry Review, Manoa, Yellow Silk, Zyzzyva, and Calyx.

She lectured at the University of Hawaii at Manoa and at West O'ahu, Tianjin Foreign Languages Institute in Hexi District, Tianjin China, and California State University, East Bay.

She divides her time between Oakland, California, and Honolulu.

== Awards ==
- 1988 American Book Award, for Wode Shuofa: My Way of Speaking
- 1998 Firecracker Alternative Book Award for Poetry for Ono Ono Girl's Hula
- California Arts Council Fellowship

== Works ==
- Wode Shuofa: My Way of Speaking. Tooth of Time Books. 1988. ISBN 978-0-940510-15-9.
- Ono Ono Girl's Hula. University of Wisconsin Press. 1997. ISBN 978-0-299-15634-3. "Carolyn Lei-Lanilau."

=== Anthologies ===
- L. Ling-chi Wang; Yiheng Zhao; Carrie L. Waara, eds. (1991). Chinese American Poetry: An Anthology. Asian American Voices. ISBN 978-0-9629639-0-2.
- L. Ling-Chi Wang; Henry Y. H. Zhao, eds. (January 1992). Chinese American Poetry: An Anthology. University of Washington Press. ISBN 978-0-295-97154-4.
- Blue mesa review. Creative Writing Center, University of New Mexico. 1994. ISBN 978-1-885290-05-2.
- Adrienne Rich; David Lehman, eds. (1996). The Best American Poetry of 1996. Scribner. ISBN 978-0-684-81455-1.
- Elaine H. Kim; Lilia V. Villanueva, eds. (1997). "The Presence of Lite Spam". Making More Waves: New Writing By Asian American Women. Beacon Press. p. 109. ISBN 978-0-8070-5913-5.
- Diane Glancy; Mark Nowak, eds. (1999). Visit teepee town: native writings after the detours. Coffee House Press. ISBN 978-1-56689-084-7.
- Rajini Srikanth; Esther Yae Iwanaga, eds. (2001). "from Ono Ono Girl's Hula". Bold words: a century of Asian American writing. Rutgers University Press. p. 52. ISBN 978-0-8135-2966-0.
