= Enid Shomer =

American novelist, short story writer, poet

- Born: United States
- Occupations: Novelist; short story writer; poet
- Writing career
- Genres: Literary fiction, poetry

Enid Shomer is an American poet and fiction writer. She is the author of five poetry collections, two short story collections and a novel. Her poems have appeared in literary journals and magazines including The Atlantic Monthly, Poetry, Paris Review, The New Criterion, Parnassus, Kenyon Review, Tikkun, and in anthologies including The Best American Poetry. Her stories have appeared in The New Yorker, New Stories from the South, the Year's Best, Modern Maturity, New Letters, Prairie Schooner, Shenandoah, and Virginia Quarterly Review. Her stories, poems, and essays have been included in more than fifty anthologies and textbooks, including Poetry: A HarperCollins Pocket Anthology. Her book reviews and essays have appeared in The New Times Book Review, The Women's Review of Books, and elsewhere. Two of her books, Stars at Noon and Imaginary Men, were the subjects of feature interviews on NPR's Morning Edition and All Things Considered. Her writing is often set in or influenced by life in the State of Florida. Shomer was Poetry Series Editor for the University of Arkansas Press from 2002 to 2015, and has taught at many universities, including the University of Arkansas, Florida State University, and the Ohio State University, where she was the Thurber House Writer-in-Residence.

In 2013, she received The Lifetime Achievement Award in Writing from The Florida Humanities Council.

Shomer has a B.A. from Wellesley College and an M.A. from the University of Miami.

== Honors and awards ==
Her first book of stories, Imaginary Men won both the Iowa Fiction Prize and the LSU/Southern Review Prize, both given annually for the best first collection of stories by an American author. Her second collection, Tourist Season, won the gold medal for Fiction in The Florida Book Awards and was also selected for Barnes and Noble's Discover Great New Writers program. Her novel, The Twelve Rooms of the Nile, was selected by National Public Radio as one of the best six historical novels of the year. Her fifth book of poetry, Shoreless, won the Lexi Rudnitsky Editor's Choice Award with Persea Books.

Shomer's other awards include two fellowships in poetry from the National Endowment for the Arts, three fellowships from the State of Florida, the Eunice Tietjens Prize from “Poetry”, the Celia Wagner Award of the Poetry Society of America, the Randall Jarrell Prize, Wildwood Prize, the Eve of St. Agnes Prize, the Washington Prize, and the Guy Owen Prize from Southern Poetry Review. Her poem sequence, Pope Joan, was adapted into an opera by composer Anne LeBaron and choreographer Mark Taylor, and premiered in October 2000. In fiction, she has also won the H.E. Frances Prize, the Iowa Woman Prize, and the 2004 Emily Clark Balch Prize from the Virginia Quarterly Review.

== Published works ==
Poetry Collections

- Shoreless (Persea Books, 2020)
- All We Know of Pleasure: Poetic Erotica by Women (edited) (Blair, 2018)
- Stars at Noon: Poems from the Life of Jacqueline Cochran (University of Arkansas Press, 2001)
- Black Drum (University of Arkansas Press, 1997)
- This Close to the Earth (University of Arkansas Press, 1992)
- Stalking the Florida Panther (Word Works, 1987)

Chapbooks

- Driving Through the Animal (Upper Rubber Boot Books, 2016)
- The Startle Effect (American Studies Press, 1983)
- Florida Postcards (Jubilee Press, 1987)

Short Story Collections

- Imaginary Men (University of Iowa Press, 1993)
- Tourist Season: Stories (Random House, 2007)

Novel

- The Twelve Rooms of the Nile (Simon & Schuster, 2012)
