= C. S. Giscombe =

American poet

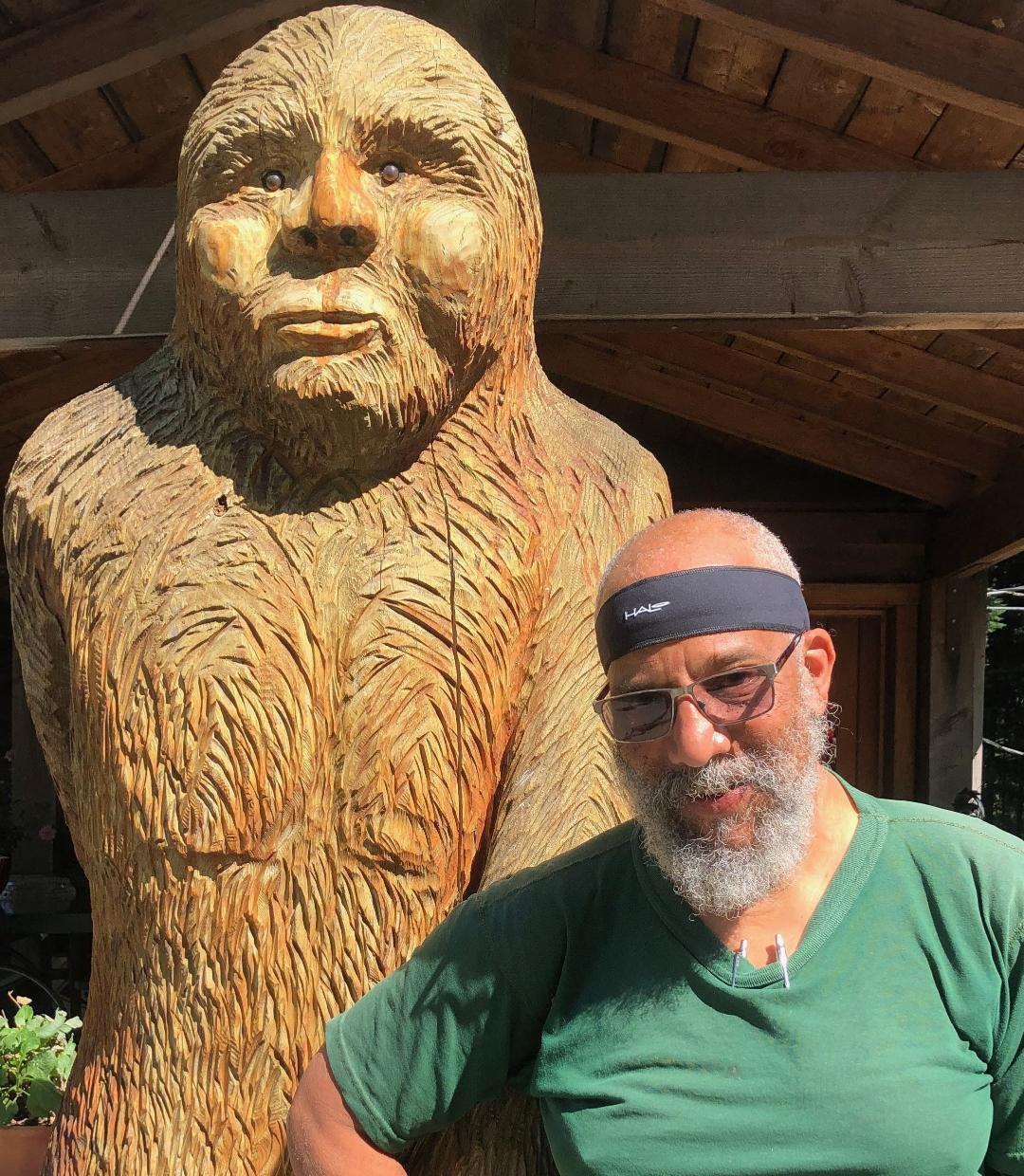
C. S. Giscombe at Roberts Lake, British Columbia, 2019

C. S. Giscombe (born 1950 Dayton, Ohio) is an African-American poet, essayist, and professor of English at University of California, Berkeley.

== Life ==
A graduate of SUNY at Albany and Cornell University where he earned degrees, he was editor of Epoch magazine in the 1970s and 1980s. He has taught at Cornell University, Syracuse University, Illinois State University, and Pennsylvania State University. As of 2024, he teaches at University of California, Berkeley.

His work has appeared in Callaloo, Chicago Review, Hambone, Iowa Review, Boundary 2, Paris Review, etc.. Giscombe’s honors and awards include the Stephen Henderson Award in Poetry, an American Book Award, and the Carl Sandburg Prize. Additionally, he has received fellowships from the National Endowment for the Arts, the Fund for Poetry, the Council for the International Exchange of Scholars, and the Canadian Embassy. There have been a plethora of acknowledgments throughout Giscombe's career.

Giscombe has also worked as a taxi driver, a hospital orderly, and a railroad brakeman. He acknowledges his childhood fascination with trains as having an influence in his writing, noting that the railroad is "not sentimental...continuous...intimately connected to features of land and water."

== Awards ==
- 1998 Carl Sandburg Award for Giscome Road.
- 2008 American Book Award for Prairie Style
- 2010 Stephen Henderson Award.
- Fellowships and grants from the Canadian Embassy to the United States, the Fund for Poetry, the Illinois Arts Council, the National Endowment for the Arts, the New York Foundation for the Arts, etc.

== Works ==
- Negro Mountain. University of Chicago Press. 2023. ISBN 0226829715.
- Similarly. Dalkey Archive Press. 2023. ISBN 1628973188.
- Train Music. (with Judith Margolis). Omnidawn Press. 2021. ISBN 978-1632430885.
- Border Towns. Dalkey Archive Press. 2016. ISBN 1564787656.
- Ohio Railroads. Omnidawn Press. 2014. ISBN 1890650749.
- Prairie Style. Dalkey Archive Press. 2008. ISBN 9781564785138.
- Inland. Leroy Chapbooks. 2001.
- Into and Out of Dislocation. Farrar, Straus & Giroux/ North Point. 2000. ISBN 9780865475410.
- Two Sections from "Practical Geography." Diæresis Press. 1999.
- Giscome Road. Dalkey Archive Press. 1998. ISBN 978-1-56478-184-0.
- Here. Dalkey Archive Press. 1994. ISBN 978-1-56478-338-7.
- At Large. St. Lazaire Press. 1989.
- Postcards. Ithaca House. 1977. ISBN 0878860894.
