= Vladimir Gandelsman =

Poet

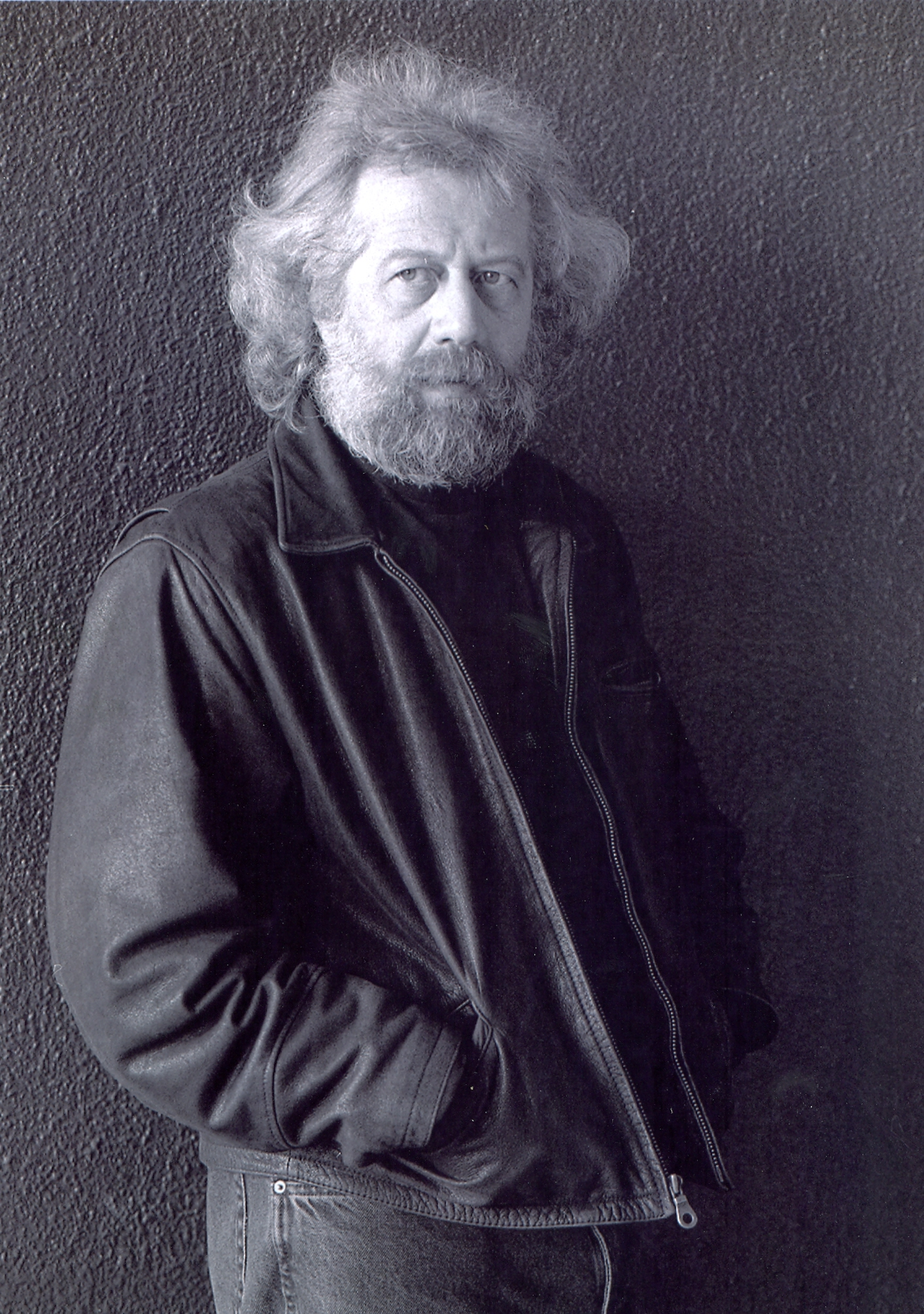
- Born: November 12, 1948 (age 77)
- Education: Leningrad Electrotechnical Institute
- Occupations: Poet, translator
- Awards: Russian Prize

Vladimir Arkadyevich Gandelsman (born November 12, 1948, in Leningrad) is a Russian poet and translator.

Born in Leningrad, he was the youngest of three children in the family. Father - a Navy Captain, Arkady Manuilovich Gandelsman (1910–1991), originally from Snovsk, mother - Riva Davidovna Gaitskhoki (1913–1998), originally from Nevel.

Graduated from the Leningrad Electrotechnical Institute. He worked as an engineer, watchman, fireman, guide, loader in a beauty salon on Nevsky.

Since 1990 in the US, he taught Russian at Vassar College; continues to teach Russian and literature.

He has been publishing poetry since 1990. Inheriting as a whole the post-acmeistic line of Russian verse, Gandelsman effectively introduces elements of avant-garde poetics into the fabric of verse (fragments of the stream of consciousness and colloquial speech, the transmission of a voice in a lyric poem from one character to another, a shock rhyme). Gandelsman especially succeeds in describing Soviet everyday life of the 1950s-1960s, based on childhood memories, but completely free from sentimentality, as well as poems, the central motive of which is the restoration of images of deceased loved ones.

Vladimir Gandelsman owns a number of translations of modern American poetry, including The Hunt for the Snark by Lewis Carroll, poems by Emily Dickinson, W.H. Auden, Wallace Stevens, James Merrill, Eamon Grennan, Anthony Hecht, Louise Glück, Glyn Maxwell and others, as well as Thomas Venclova's translation books "Faceted Air" and "Stone Seeker". In 2010, in Moscow, the New Publishing House published a translation of Shakespeare's tragedy "Macbeth" (republished in 2016 in Moscow by the "Aquarius" publishing house).

Joseph Brodsky in a letter addressed to Gandelsman and published in the magazine "Continent", No. 66, wrote: "Poems amaze by the intensity of spiritual energy", "stun with the literality of feelings, their naked metaphysics, the absence of tears", (they have) "love of love, love toward love – the biggest innovation in Russian verse, captured in this century".

Laureate of the 2008 Liberty Award. Laureate of the 2008 Russian Prize. In 2011 he was awarded the Moscow Account prize for the book Ode to Dandelion. Winner of the 2012 Anthologia Prize.

In November 2016, Vladimir Gandelsman became a participant in the New York "Russian Seasons at the Nicholas Roerich Museum".

== Family ==
- cousin: Alexander Zhurbin, composer
- cousin: Yuri Zhurbin, musician
- cousin: Victor Levtov, Russian scientist, physiologist and hematologist

== Work ==
- The noise of the earth. - Tinaflay: Hermitage, 1991.
- There is a house on the Neva ...: A novel in verse. - Tinaflay: Hermitage, 1991; Saint Petersburg: Pushkin Foundation, 1995.
- Evening mail. – Moscow – SPb .: Phoenix; Atheneum, 1995.
- Longitude of the day. - SPb .: Pushkin Foundation, 1998.
- Heron. - Paris - Moscow - New York: The Third Wave, 1999.
- Oedipus. - SPb .: Abel, 1998.
- Quiet coat. - SPb .: Pushkin Foundation, 2000.
- New rhymes. - SPb .: Pushkin Foundation, 2003.
- School waltz. - SPb .: Pushkin Foundation, 2004.
- Return boat. - SPb .: Petersburg - XXI century, 2005.
- Portrait gallery. - SPb .: Pushkin Foundation, 2008.
- Disappearance. - SPb .: Pushkin Foundation, 2008.
- Stone Island. - New York, 2009.
- Rook endgame. - SPb .: Pushkin Foundation, 2010 ([1])
- Ode to dandelion. - Moscow: Russian Gulliver, 2010.
- Schedule reader (Life of my own composition). SPb .: Pushkin Foundation, 2012
- Vision. SPb .: Pushkin Foundation, 2012 ([2])
- Arcadia. SPb .: Pushkin Foundation, 2014
- Griftsov. Moscow: Voymega, 2014
- The mind of words. Moscow: Vremya, 2015
