= Raymond R. Patterson =

American poet

Raymond Richard Patterson (December 14, 1929 - April 5, 2001) was an American poet, opera librettist, and educator.

== Biography ==
Born in Harlem, Raymond Patterson moved to Long Island with his family as a teenager and remained in the New York area most of his life.

Patterson received a B.A. from Lincoln University (Pennsylvania), M.A. in English from New York University in 1954.

Patterson taught English at Benedict College in South Carolina, in the New York City public schools, and at City University of New York, where he was a professor from 1968 until 1992.

He served as an executive board member of the Poetry Society of America, PEN American Center, and the Walt Whitman Birthplace. In 1973, Patterson founded the Langston Hughes Medal and Festival at City College of New York and served as its director until 1993.

Patterson wrote librettos for two operas by Hale Smith – David Walker and Goree – and his work was also featured in Three Patterson Lyrics, another composition by Hale Smith, which premiered at Alice Tully Hall in 1985.

== Bibliography ==
- The Dangerous River, Sloane, 1954
- Get Caught: a photographic essay, 1964 (with photography by Lawrence Sykes)
- 26 Ways of Looking at a Black Man and Other Poems, Award Books, 1969
- Elemental Blues, Cross-Cultural Communications, 1983
- Elemental Bliss, Cross-Cultural Communications, 1989
