= List of winners of the Academy of American Poets fellowship =

The Academy Fellowship of the Academy of American Poets is awarded annually for "distinguished poetic achievement" at mid-career. Fellows are awarded a stipend which is $25,000. The fellowship program was created in 1946, since 1995 given in memory of James Ingram Merrill.

The fellowship was the first of the academy's portfolio of awards; the academy's website describes it as "the first of its kind in the United States."

Academy fellows:

- 1937 Edwin Markham
- 1946 Edgar Lee Masters
- 1947 Ridgely Torrence
- 1948 Percy MacKaye
- 1950 E. E. Cummings
- 1952 Padraic Colum
- 1953 Robert Frost
- 1954 Louise Townsend Nicholl; Oliver St. John Gogarty
- 1955 Rolfe Humphries
- 1956 William Carlos Williams
- 1957 Conrad Aiken
- 1958 Robinson Jeffers
- 1959 Louise Bogan
- 1960 Jesse Stuart
- 1961 Horace Gregory
- 1962 John Crowe Ransom
- 1963 Ezra Pound; Allen Tate
- 1964 Elizabeth Bishop
- 1965 Marianne Moore
- 1966 Archibald MacLeish; John Berryman
- 1967 Mark Van Doren
- 1968 Stanley Kunitz
- 1969 Richard Eberhart; Anthony Hecht
- 1970 Howard Nemerov
- 1971 James Wright
- 1972 W. D. Snodgrass
- 1973 W. S. Merwin
- 1974 Léonie Adams
- 1975 Robert Hayden
- 1976 J. V. Cunningham
- 1977 Louis Coxe
- 1978 Josephine Miles
- 1979 May Swenson; Mark Strand
- 1980 Mona Van Duyn
- 1981 Richard Hugo
- 1982 John Frederick Nims; John Ashbery
- 1983 James Schuyler; Philip Booth
- 1984 Richmond Lattimore; Robert Francis
- 1985 Amy Clampitt; Maxine Kumin
- 1986 Irving Feldman; Howard Moss
- 1987 Josephine Jacobsen; Alfred Corn
- 1988 Donald Justice
- 1989 Richard Howard
- 1990 William Meredith
- 1991 J. D. McClatchy
- 1992 Adrienne Rich
- 1993 Gerald Stern
- 1994 David Ferry
- 1995 Denise Levertov
- 1996 Jay Wright
- 1997 John Haines
- 1998 Charles Simic
- 1999 Gwendolyn Brooks
- 2000 Lyn Hejinian
- 2001 Ellen Bryant Voigt
- 2002 Sharon Olds
- 2003 Li-Young Lee
- 2004 Jane Hirshfield
- 2005 Claudia Rankine
- 2006 Carl Phillips
- 2007 James McMichael
- 2008 Brigit Pegeen Kelly
- 2009 Harryette Mullen
- 2010 Khaled Mattawa
- 2011 Joan Larkin
- 2012 Brenda Hillman
- 2013 Carolyn Forché
- 2014 Tracy K. Smith
- 2015 Marie Howe
- 2016 Natasha Trethewey
- 2017 Ed Roberson
- 2018 Martín Espada
- 2019 Ilya Kaminsky
- 2020 Carmen Giménez Smith
