= Mercy (poetry collection) =

2004 poetry collection by Lucille Clifton

Mercy: Poems
- Author: Lucille Clifton
- Publisher: BOA Editions, Ltd.
- Publication date: September 1, 2004
- Pages: 79
- ISBN: 9781929918546

Mercy is a 2004 poetry collection by Lucille Clifton, published by BOA Editions, Ltd. Its poems, in Clifton's typical spare style, encompasses topics such as "the relationship between mothers and daughters, terrorism, prejudice, and personal faith."

== Critical reception ==
Angela DiPace, writing for the Presidential Seminar on the Catholic Intellectual Tradition, saw the book as a culmination of Clifton's four decades of poetics applied to more contemporary issues, specifically the September 11 attacks, and, through such application, "excavates from this horrific tragedy a sign of redemptive liberation... which sustains and uplifts what otherwise might be a nihilistic view of life."

Cherise A. Pollard, in the Langston Hughes Review, wrote that "Mercy throbs with suffering as well as a need for forgiveness and a desire for connection that is tempered with a hope that anticipates the need for strength in the face of other, even greater challenges to the individual and collective spirit."

Joanne Mallari lauded Clifton's "small-boned verse," commending her ability to tackle subjects like racism, family, and gender with concision.
