= Savage Pageant =

2020 debut poetry collection by Jessica Q. Stark

- Author: Jessica Q. Stark
- Genre: Poetry
- Publisher: Birds, LLC
- Publication date: March 17, 2020
- Pages: 116
- ISBN: 978-0-9826177-3-1

Savage Pageant is a 2020 debut poetry collection by Jessica Q. Stark, published by Birds, LLC.

== Synopsis ==
The book, a work of documentary poetics, traces the history of Jungleland, a defunct zoo in Thousand Oaks, California, that housed Hollywood's performing animals from the 1920s until its closure in 1969.

== Background ==
Stark told BOA Editions in 2023 that Savage Pageant was a "haunted text" that interrogated "the specificity of a place that is haunted by barely perceptible physical traces—of a zoo in California and in the soil and blood of our nation." She also shared her experiences researching at Duke University, stating that "the stuff of real research is not glamorous" and involves "piecemeal, incomplete histories, imperfect cataloguing, missing parts."

== Critical reception ==
Savage Pageant was named one of the best poetry books of 2020 by both The Boston Globe and Hyperallergic. It was also a finalist for the Poetry Society of America's Norma Farber First Book Award.

The Los Angeles Review called the book "splendidly complex," stating that Stark "presents as her central thesis: yes, the culture of spectacle destroys an organic connection to our bodies in the world. However, she argues, we need the spectacle to survive."

INDY Week praised it as "a thoughtful and important addition" to the tradition of documentary poetics and in particular called the title poem "gripping."

Heavy Feather Review called it "a show-stopping debut" that "goes way beyond its potential as a collection of poetry," praising how it "rushes in with spectacle but leaves a fierce, burning hunger for what America remembers and what America forgets."

The Carolina Quarterly called it "a profound work of care that insists on our becoming involved in the face of historic and continued harm."
