= Blessing the Boats =

2000 poetry collection by Lucille Clifton

Blessing the Boats: New and Selected Poems, 1988–2000
- Author: Lucille Clifton
- Publisher: BOA Editions, Ltd.
- Publication date: April 1, 2000
- Pages: 132
- ISBN: 9781880238875

Blessing the Boats: New and Selected Poems, 1988–2000 is a 2000 poetry collection by Lucille Clifton, published by BOA Editions, Ltd. It won the National Book Award for Poetry in the same year.

The book's poem of the same name, "blessing the boats," is featured in Poets.org's Teach This Poem segment.

== Critical reception ==
Publishers Weekly concluded that "this collection distills a distinctive American voice, one that pulls no punches in taking on the best and worst of life."

Bianca Ward, writing for Voices from the Gaps, lauded Clifton's sense of empowerment even in the face of challenges like cancer and aging. Ward concluded: "This book should be read by all women, young or old and not just women. It speaks to people of any race, of any gender, and to survivors of any illness. It speaks to humanity. She writes about her personal experiences involving gender conflict and racism, by using everyday experiences in hopes of relating to women everywhere."
