= Louis Kent =

American poet

- Occupation: Poet
- Writing career
- Notable awards: Shelley Memorial Award (1950)

Louis Kent was an American poet.

== Life ==
His work appeared in The New Yorker and Poetry Magazine.

He graduated from the University of Kansas, before working for the Department of Labor in Washington, D.C.

== Award ==
- 1949/1950 Shelley Memorial Award

== Work ==
- "Actual Grape" (PDF). Beloit Poetry Journal: 15. Summer 1951.
- "Wreaths for the Phoenix" (PDF). Beloit Poetry Journal: 16. Summer 1951.
- Declensions of the air: Poems. Dutton. 1950.

== Review ==
In a review by Louise Townsend Nicholl, Kent received the following praise:

so far as I know, Louis Kent has never published another book of poems - which is too bad. Robert Hillyer, who was much interested in his work, brought him to me at Dutton's & I agreed on his "true lyrical genius", as Robert said. I had one few hours meeting with him & lunch - a tall young man, incisive & sincere & eager. Perhaps we will see his name again on a book someday. Louise Townsend Nicholl, 1956
