= Voices (poetry collection) =

2008 poetry collection by Lucille Clifton

- Author: Lucille Clifton
- Publisher: BOA Editions, Ltd.
- Publication date: November 1, 2008
- Pages: 72
- ISBN: 9781934414125

Voices is a 2008 poetry collection by Lucille Clifton. Her last official poetry collection before her death in 2010, it was published by BOA Editions, Ltd. on November 1, 2008. Like many of Clifton's prior poetry collections, it features speakers who speak from a lowercase "i" alongside the appearance of numerous figures in Black history such as Sally Hemings.

== Critical reception ==
Publishers Weekly stated that "Where Clifton's earlier poetry sought strength in African-American oral traditions, these poems look even further back, to the origin of writing... Clifton... retains an undeniable sincerity, an openness to her own emotions, and a rare warmth."

Observing its persona poems, and general use of personification, Cameron Conaway (writing for Rattle) stated that "Clifton's unique ability to not only see but to capture emotional dichotomies of issues surrounding issues and braid them like challah is what makes her one of the most frequently taught and famous poets living in the world today."

Mary Jane Lupton, writing for Poets' Quarterly, pointed out that some of the included poems must have been from Clifton's other, and ultimately incomplete, project, Colored Women, wherein Clifton sought to write about Black women like Hemings and Aunt Jemima. In conclusion, Lupton wrote that the "themes of voices, wisdom, the hands, the ox, and silence help to enlighten the title of this short but brilliant collection and to fuse its separate parts."
