= The Winged Seed =

1995 memoir by Li-Young Lee

The Winged Seed: A Remembrance
- Author: Li-Young Lee
- Publisher: Simon & Schuster
- Publication date: 1995
- ISBN: 978-1938160042
- Preceded by: The City In Which I Love You
- Followed by: Book of My Nights

The Winged Seed: A Remembrance is a 1995 memoir by Li-Young Lee, published by Simon & Schuster. The book went on to win an American Book Award, and it was later reissued by BOA Editions for its American Reader Series in 2013.

== Contents ==
Narrated through Lee as he lays in bed with his wife in their Chicago home, the book concerns Li's family history, specifically his grandfather who was Yuan Shikai, the first president of the Republic of China, as well as Lee's father who was a personal physician to Mao Zedong but later had to flee persecution in the fifties by escaping to Indonesia. There, Lee's father founded a university in Jakarta but was eventually convicted as a political prisoner by the Sukarno regime. Lee, born in 1957, and his siblings thus grew up and spent their formative childhood years aware of their father's incarceration and subsequently waiting for his freedom. After Lee's father was released, Lee's family escaped to Hong Kong and eventually resettled in the United States. Convinced that their survival was miraculous, Lee's father took up the Christian faith and became a Presbyterian minister.

== Critical reception ==
Kirkus Reviews called the book "a haunting exploration of memory, identity, love, and exile." The reviewer said characteristics of Lee's poetry found its way into his prose, making for a memoir "beautifully rendered" in its tormented remembrances. Publishers Weekly similarly called the book a "lyrical memoir"and said that "In this evocative tale, politics plays a lesser role than family history and love in a world that was sad, frightening and hard for a child to understand. For the reader, however, Li-Young's portraits of the times are vividly illuminating."

Michael Harris, writing for the Los Angeles Times, argued for the book's blurring of the line between prose and poetry, saying that "In his compulsion to communicate all this, Lee moves from a poetic prose to an uncompromising poetry, when only the authority of his voice sustains us through stretches of pure metaphor and we have to trust—as we find we generally do—that the words flying past us carry the seeds of sense." Arthur McMaster, in Rattle, also called the book a "book length poem" and argued in favor of its classification as such despite its intention as a memoir:

"But hold on: Is a memoir retelling a man’s family’s troubled past with a revered but much distracted father really a poem? Semantics aside, it can be. I think this one is. The narration sings to us. The telling is consistently lyrical. Metaphors involving seeds populate the book, and the various and numinous seeds which preoccupied Lee’s father, a Christian bible scholar, offer unforeseen insights into the human condition."

In Ploughshares, Kristina Kopić dismissed the terminology of memoir and autobiography, instead concentrating on Lee's specific use of the term "remembrance" in the book's subtitle. Lauding Lee's refusal to "impose narrative on everything", Kopić said that "he explores incredible acts of human cruelty, tragedy and kindness. And the success of his unconventional narrative structure is that it resists simplifying any of these difficult topics; it demands that the reader finish making sense of Lee’s remembrances."
