= Buffalo Girl =

2023 poetry collection by Jessica Q. Stark

- Author: Jessica Q. Stark
- Genre: Poetry
- Publisher: BOA Editions
- Publication date: April 18, 2023
- Pages: 107
- ISBN: 978-1-950774-88-3

Buffalo Girl is a 2023 poetry collection by Jessica Q. Stark, published by BOA Editions. It won a silver medal in the 2023 Florida Book Awards for poetry and was a finalist for the Maya Angelou Book Award.

== Form ==
The book explores Stark's mother's immigration to the United States after the Vietnam War, specifically using Little Red Riding Hood as an analog. In addition to poetry, the book makes use of her mother's photography juxtaposed with Little Red Riding Hood illustrations.

== Critical reception ==
Heavy Feather Review called the book "a fairytale—but not the kind that makes you feel good in the end," commending how Stark "creates a collage that interrogates what it means to embody contradiction: to be both Vietnamese and American, to be both desired and reviled."

The Poetry Foundation observed Stark's usage of Little Red Riding Hood as a metaphor, observing that "With new images and inventive texts, Buffalo Girl counters the ever-terrorizing gazes and the wolves behind them, including the self." Salamander called the usage of the fairy tale "genius."

RHINO lauded the collection's treatment of survival and migration, as well as its hybrid form combining text and imagery.

The EcoTheo Review concluded: "Buffalo Girl is an incredibly complex and compelling collection that challenges Westernized ways of thinking, seeing, and categorizing difference by using image, syntax, and space to understand the possibilities of imagining a different reality, leaving us as readers curious, awake, and alert."
