= Jessica Q. Stark =

American poet

Jessica Q. Stark is an American poet of Vietnamese descent. She is the author of five chapbooks and two full length collections: Buffalo Girl (Boa Editions, 2023) and Savage Pageant (Birds LLC, 2020).

== Early life ==
Stark grew up in Southern California. During her doctoral studies in English at Duke University she worked at Duke University's rare collections archive.

== Career ==
Stark's poetry has been published by Poetry Society of America, The Nation, Pleiades, Gulf Coast, and The Florida Review.

In 2016, Stark released her debut chapbook, The Liminal Parade. It was the winner of the Heavy Feather Double Take Grand Poetry Prize.

In 2020, Stark released her debut full-length poetry collection, Savage Pageant, through Birds LLC, and the following year her debut was recognized as a finalist for the 2021 Norma Farber First Book Award.

In 2022, Stark's second full-length poetry collection, Buffalo Girl, was published with Boa Editions. Buffalo Girl was recognized a silver medal winner by the 2023 Florida Book Award for Poetry and was a finalist for the 2023 Maya Angelou Book Award.

In 2025, South Arts named Stark as one of their 2025 State Fellows for Literary Arts.

Stark serves as a poetry editor at AGNI. She teaches creative writing as an Assistant Professor at the University of North Florida in Jacksonville, FL where she hosts the Noonlit Reading Series and curates Riverrun: A Poetry Stream.

== Bibliography ==
=== Poetry collections ===
- The Flea (Ethel Zine, 2025) (chapbook)
- Buffalo Girl (Boa Editions, 2022) ISBN 978-1-950774-88-3
- Render (Eat Magazine, 2022) (chapbook)
- Innanet (The Offending Adam, 2021) (chapbook)
- Savage Pageant (Birds LLC, 2020) ISBN 978-0-9826177-3-1
- Vasilisa the Wise (Ethel Zine Press, 2018) (chapbook)
- The Liminal Parade (Heavy Feather Review, 2016) (chapbook)
