= The Terrible Stories =

1996 poetry collection by Lucille Clifton

- Author: Lucille Clifton
- Publisher: BOA Editions, Ltd.
- Publication date: January 1996
- Pages: 70
- ISBN: 9781880238370

The Terrible Stories is a 1996 poetry collection by Lucille Clifton, published by BOA Editions, Ltd. Clifton's first book of poems following her breast cancer diagnosis, It was a finalist for the National Book Award for Poetry.

== Critical reception ==
Publishers Weekly stated that "Heir to Langston Hughes's deceptively ordinary voice, Clifton crafts brief lines and accessible metaphors into a profound and often humorous commentary on the rich survival skills of women, family love and contemporary American—particularly African American—life." The reviewer, in particular, commended Clifton's ability to transmute the darkness of lived experience into beauty and hope, calling her "among our most trustworthy and gifted poets."

Gayle Sulik, writing for Pink Ribbon Blues, emphasized Clifton's use of narrative to confront and contend with "challenging life experiences" such as cancer: "She emphasized the importance of memory in helping people to heal the wounds of life, not to rise above them but to travel with them."
