= Lucille Clifton =

American poet (1936–2010)

- Born: Thelma Lucille Sayles; June 27, 1936; Depew, New York, US
- Died: February 13, 2010 (aged 73); Baltimore, Maryland, US
- Education: Howard University; State University of New York, Fredonia
- Occupation: Writer
- Spouse: Fred James Clifton (d. 1984)
- Awards: Robert Frost Medal (2010)

Lucille Clifton (June 27, 1936 – February 13, 2010) was an American poet, writer, and educator from Buffalo, New York. From 1979 to 1985 she was Poet Laureate of Maryland. Clifton was a finalist twice for the Pulitzer Prize for poetry.

== Life and career ==
Lucille Clifton (born Thelma Lucille Sayles, in Depew, New York) grew up in Buffalo, New York, and graduated from Fosdick-Masten Park High School in 1953. She attended Howard University with a scholarship from 1953 to 1955, leaving to study at the State University of New York at Fredonia (near Buffalo).

In 1958, Lucille Sayles married Fred J. Clifton, a professor of philosophy at the University at Buffalo, and a sculptor whose carvings depicted African faces. Lucille and her husband had six children together, and she worked as a claims clerk in the New York State Division of Employment, Buffalo (1958–60), and then as literature assistant in the Office of Education in Washington, D.C. (1960–71). Writer Ishmael Reed introduced Lucille to Clifton while he was organizing the Buffalo Community Drama Workshop. Fred and Lucille Clifton starred in the group's version of The Glass Menagerie, which was called "poetic and sensitive" by the Buffalo Evening News.

In 1966, Reed took some of Clifton's poems to Langston Hughes, who included them in the second edition of his anthology The Poetry of the Negro (1970). In 1967, the Cliftons moved to Baltimore, Maryland. Her first poetry collection, Good Times, was published in 1969, and listed by The New York Times as one of the year's ten best books. A selection of sixteen poems from Good Times were featured in the Massachusetts Review, Vol. 10, No. 1, her first publication. From 1971 to 1974, Clifton was poet-in-residence at Coppin State College in Baltimore. From 1979 to 1985, she was Poet Laureate of the state of Maryland. From 1982 to 1983, she was visiting writer at the Columbia University School of the Arts and at George Washington University. In 1984, her husband died of cancer.

From 1985 to 1989, Clifton was a professor of literature and creative writing at the University of California, Santa Cruz. She was Distinguished Professor of Humanities at St. Mary's College of Maryland. From 1995 to 1999, she was a visiting professor at Columbia University. In 2006, she was a fellow at Dartmouth College. She died in Baltimore on February 13, 2010.

In 2019, daughter Sidney Clifton reacquired the family's home near Baltimore, aiming to establish the Clifton House as a place to support young artists and writers through in-person and virtual workshops, classes, seminars, residencies, and a gallery. The Clifton House received preservation funding through the National Trust for Historic Preservation's African American Cultural Heritage Action Fund.

== Poetic work ==
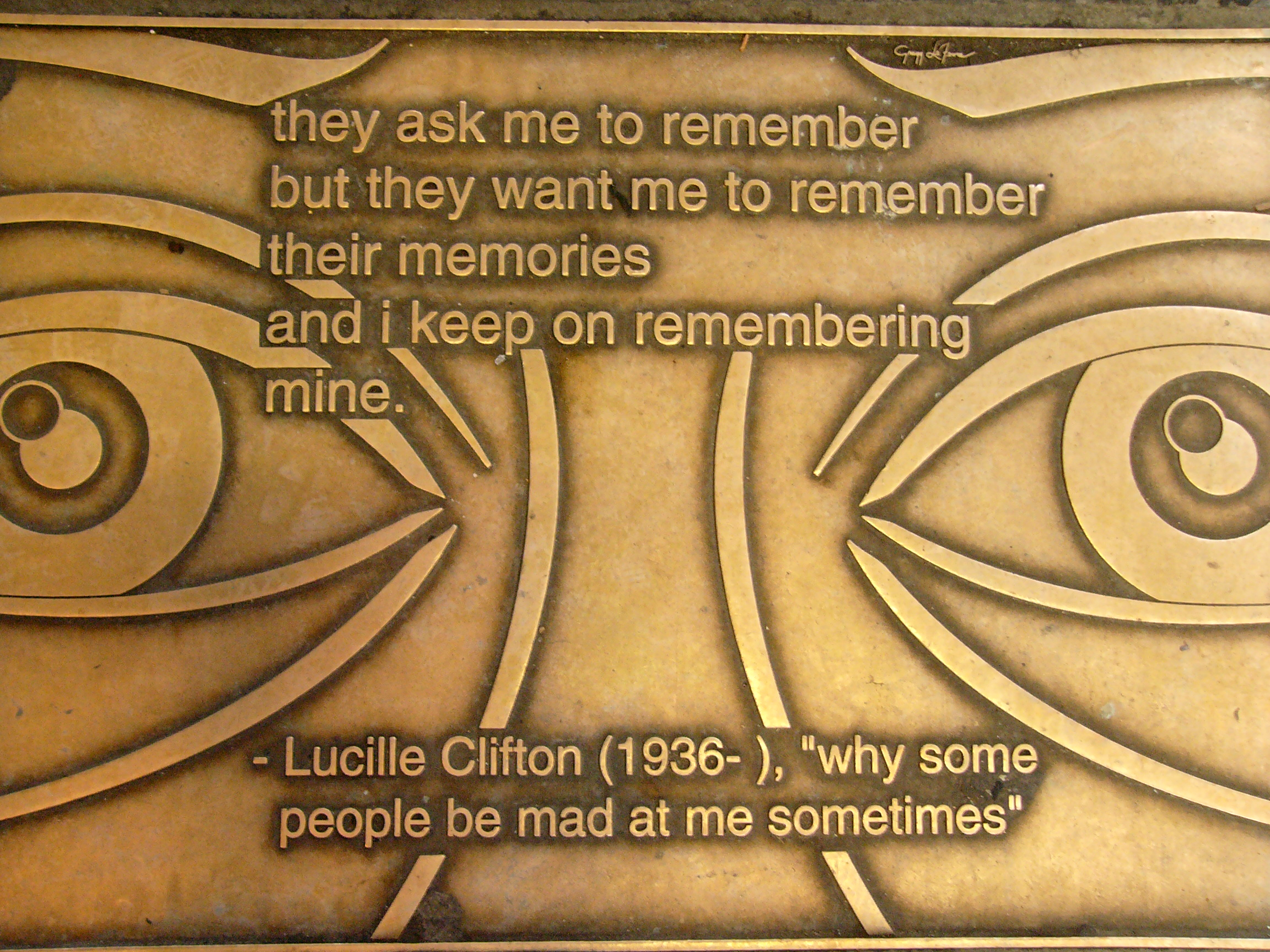
Plaque quoting Clifton outside the New York Public Library

Lucille Clifton traced her family's roots to the West African kingdom of Dahomey, now the Republic of Benin. Growing up, she was told by her mother, "Be proud, you're from Dahomey women!" She cites as one of her ancestors the first black woman to be "legally hanged" for manslaughter in the state of Kentucky during the time of Slavery in the United States. Girls in her family are born with an extra finger on each hand, a genetic trait known as polydactyly. Lucille's two extra fingers were amputated surgically when she was a small child, a common practice at that time for reasons of superstition and social stigma. Her "two ghost fingers" and their activities became a theme in her poetry and other writings. Health problems in her later years included painful gout which gave her some difficulty in walking.

Often compared to Emily Dickinson for her short line length and deft rhymes, Clifton wrote poetry that "examine[d] the inner world of her own body", used the body as a "theatre for her poetry". After her uterus was removed, for example, she spoke of her body "as a home without a kitchen". In a Christian Century review of Clifton's work, Peggy Rosenthal wrote, 'The first thing that strikes us about Lucille Clifton's poetry is what is missing: capitalization, punctuation, long and plentiful lines. We see a poetry so pared down that its spaces take on substance, become a shaping presence as much as the words themselves.'

Her series of children's books about a young black boy began with 1970's Some of the Days of Everett Anderson. Everett Anderson, a recurring character in many of her books, spoke in African-American English and dealt with real life social problems. Clifton's work features in anthologies such as My Black Me: A Beginning Book of Black Poetry (ed. Arnold Adoff), A Poem of Her Own: Voices of American Women Yesterday and Today (ed. Catherine Clinton), Black Stars: African American Women Writers (ed. Brenda Scott Wilkinson), Daughters of Africa (ed. Margaret Busby), and Bedrock: Writers on the Wonders of Geology (eds Lauret E. Savoy, Eldridge M. Moores, and Judith E. Moores (Trinity University Press). Studies about Clifton's life and writings include Wild Blessings: The Poetry of Lucille Clifton (LSU Press, 2004) by Hilary Holladay, and Lucille Clifton: Her Life and Letters (Praeger, 2006) by Mary Jane Lupton.

=== Early volumes ===
In 1969, Clifton published her first volume of poetry, Good Times, which drew inspiration from her six young children at the time. The book would go on to make the New York Times list of the best books of the year. Three years later in 1972, Clifton published her second volume, Good News About the Earth: New Poems. The Poetry Foundation has noted that this work pointed towards the trend Clifton would develop in her career of not shying away from social and political issues in her writing as she paid tribute to Black political leaders. Moving into her third collection, Clifton began investigating her identity as a woman and as a poet with An Ordinary Woman just two years later in 1974.

=== Two-Headed Woman: "homage to my hips" ===
In 1980, Clifton published "homage to my hips" in her book of poems, Two-Headed Woman. Two-Headed Woman won the 1980 Juniper Prize and was characterized by its "dramatic tautness, simple language … tributes to blackness, [and] celebrations of women", which are all traits reflected in the poem "homage to my hips". This particular collection of poetry also marks the beginning of Clifton's interest in depicting the "transgressive black body". "homage to my hips" was preceded by the poem "homage to my hair" – and acts as a complementary work that explores the relationship between African-American women and men and aimed to reinvent the negative stereotypes associated with the black female body. "Homage to my hips" and "homage to my hair" both relate the African-American body to mythological powers – a literary technique common among many literary works by African-American women. Jane Campbell poses the idea that "the specific effect of mythmaking upon race relations … constitutes a radical act, inviting the audience to subvert the racist mythology that thwarts and defeats Afro-Americans, and to replace it with a new mythology rooted in the black perspective." Therefore, Clifton utilizes "homage to my hips" to celebrate the African-American female body as a source of power, sexuality, pride, and freedom.

=== Quilting: Poems 1987–1990 ===
Published in 1991, this collection of Clifton's treated a quilt as an extended metaphor for life, with each poem representing a different story that is "stitched" into the collection The poems are divided into sections getting their names from different quilting techniques.

=== The Book of Light ===
In 1993, Clifton's newest collection dived head first into wrestling with bigotry, social justice, and human rights. This collection is marked by a controversial poem addressing U.S. Senator Jesse Helms who had a reputation of "actively opposing civil rights, voting rights, disability rights, women's rights and gay rights".

=== Blessing the Boats: New and Selected Poems 1988–2000 ===
In 2000, Clifton published this book, which compiles four of her previous collections along with new poems. The book delves into Clifton's personal fight against breast cancer as well as involves itself with mythology, religion, and the legacy of slavery. In "dialysis", Clifton writes "after the cancer i was so grateful/ to be / alive. i am alive and furious. / Blessed be even this?"

Clifton uses this book – and much more of her work – to defy stereotypes and misconceptions of African-American women. She also writes about abortion and death in this book with poems like "the lost baby poem", where she writes "eyes closed when they should have been open/ eyes open when they should have been closed/ will accuse me for unborn babies/and dead trees."

== Awards and recognition ==
Lucille Clifton received a Creative Writing Fellowships from the National Endowment for the Arts in 1970 and 1973, and a grant from the Academy of American Poets. She received the Charity Randall prize, the Jerome J. Shestack Prize from the American Poetry Review, and an Emmy Award. Her children's book Everett Anderson's Good-bye won the 1984 Coretta Scott King Award. In 1988, Clifton became the first author to have two books of poetry named finalists for one year's Pulitzer Prize. (The award dates from 1981, the announcement of finalists from 1980.) She won the 1991/1992 Shelley Memorial Award, the 1996 Lannan Literary Award for Poetry, and for Blessing the Boats: New and Collected Poems 1988–2000 the 2000 National Book Award for Poetry.

From 1999 to 2005, she served on the Board of Chancellors of the Academy of American Poets. In 2007, she won the Ruth Lilly Poetry Prize; the $100,000 prize honors a living U.S. poet whose "lifetime accomplishments warrant extraordinary recognition". When awarding Clifton with this prize, judges remarked: "One always feels the looming humaneness around Lucille Clifton's poems—it is a moral quality that some poets have and some don't." This testifies to Clifton's reputation as a poet whose work focuses on overcoming adversity, family, and endurance from the perspective of an African-American woman.

In 2010, Clifton received the Robert Frost Medal for lifetime achievement from the Poetry Society of America.

== Works ==
=== Poetry collections ===
- Good Times, New York: Random House, 1969
- Good News About the Earth, New York: Random House, 1972
- An Ordinary Woman, New York: Random House, 1974)
- Two-Headed Woman, University of Massachusetts Press, Amherst, 1980
- Good Woman: Poems and a Memoir: 1969–1980, Brockport: BOA Editions, 1987 — finalist for the 1988 Pulitzer Prize
- Next: New Poems, Brockport: BOA Editions, Ltd., 1987 — finalist for the 1988 Pulitzer Prize
- Ten Oxherding Pictures, Santa Cruz: Moving Parts Press, 1988
- Quilting: Poems 1987–1990, Brockport: BOA Editions, 1991, ISBN 978-0-918526-81-6
- The Book of Light, Port Townsend: Copper Canyon Press, 1993
- The Terrible Stories, Brockport: BOA Editions, 1996
- Blessing The Boats: New and Collected Poems 1988–2000, Rochester: BOA Editions, 2000, ISBN 978-1-880238-88-2; Paw Prints, 2008, ISBN 978-1-4395-0356-0 —winner of the National Book Award
- Mercy, Rochester: BOA Editions, 2004, ISBN 978-1-929918-55-3
- Voices, Rochester: BOA Editions, 2008, ISBN 978-1-934414-12-5
- The Collected Poems of Lucille Clifton, Rochester: BOA Editions, 2012, ISBN 978-1-934414-90-3

=== Children's books ===
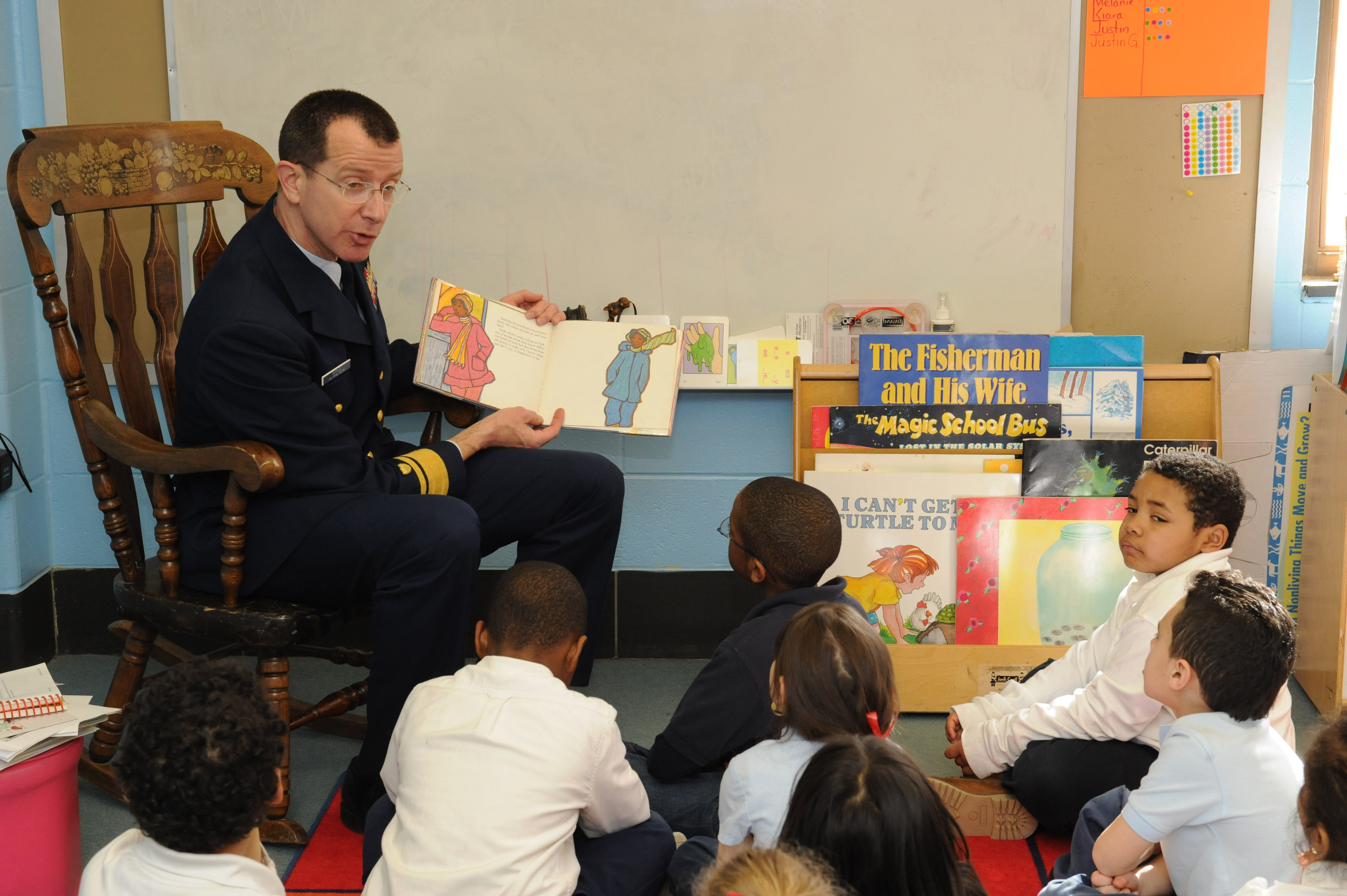
Rear Admiral J. Scott Burhoe reads Three Wishes, by Clifton, to a first-grade class at Nathan Hale Elementary in honor of African American History Month, February 12, 2010.

- Three Wishes (Doubleday)
- The Boy Who Didn't Believe In Spring (Penguin)
- The Lucky Stone. Delacorte Press. 1979. ISBN 978-0-440-05122-0.; Reprint Yearling Books, ISBN 978-0-307-53795-9
- The Times They Used To Be (Henry Holt & Co)
- All Us Come Cross the Water (Henry Holt)
- My Friend Jacob (Dutton)
- Amifika (Dutton)
- Sonora the Beautiful (Dutton)
- The Black B C's (Dutton)
- The Palm of My Heart: Poetry by African American Children. Introduction by Lucille Clifton (San Val)

=== The Everett Anderson series ===
- Everett Anderson's Goodbye (Henry Holt)
- One of the Problems of Everett Anderson (Henry Holt)
- Everett Anderson's Friend (Henry Holt)
- Everett Anderson's Christmas Coming (Henry Holt)
- Everett Anderson's 1-2-3 (Henry Holt)
- Everett Anderson's Year (Henry Holt)
- Some of the Days of Everett Anderson (Henry Holt)
- Everett Anderson's Nine Month Long (Henry Holt)

=== Nonfiction ===
- Generations: A Memoir, New York: Random House, 1976, ISBN 978-0-394-46155-7

== See also ==
- List of U.S. state poets laureate
