= James Decker =

James Decker may refer to:

- James A. Decker, the founder of the Decker Press
- James Decker, a character in the 2000 film Animal Factory
