= Brigit Pegeen Kelly =

American poet

- Born: 1951; Palo Alto, California, USA
- Died: October 14, 2016 (aged 64–65); Urbana, Illinois, USA
- Occupations: Poet, professor
- Spouse: Michael Madonick
- Children: 3
- Writing career
- Language: English
- Movement: Contemporary

Brigit Pegeen Kelly (1951 – October 14, 2016) was an American poet and teacher. Born in Palo Alto, California, Kelly grew up in southern Indiana and lived much of her adult life in central Illinois. An intensely private woman, little is known about her life.

== Career ==
Kelly was the winner of numerous awards for her poetry, including the Yale Younger Poets award, a Whiting award, and, in 1997, was named the Lamont Poet at the Phillips Exeter Academy.

Kelly was a professor of Creative Writing at the University of Illinois Urbana-Champaign and served as senior poetry editor of Ninth Letter. She also taught, previously at the University of California, Irvine, Purdue University, and Warren Wilson College.

== Awards ==
- 2008: Fellowship of the Academy of American Poets
- 2006: Fellowship from the John Simon Guggenheim Memorial Foundation
- 2005: Pulitzer Prize (poetry), Finalist (for The Orchard)
- 2005: National Book Critics' Circle (poetry), Finalist
- 2005: Los Angeles Times Book Award (poetry), Finalist
- 2005: National Endowment for the Arts Fellowship
- 2000: James Merrill House Fellowship
- 1999: American Academy of Arts and Letters Witter Bynner Poetry Prize
- 1996: Whiting Award
- 1995: Los Angeles Times Book Prize in Poetry, Finalist
- 1994: Lamont Poetry Prize (for Song)
- 1986: Yale Younger Poets Award, selected by James Merrill
- 1986: Discovery/The Nation Poetry Prize

== Books ==
- Poems: Song and The Orchard. Carcanet. 2008. ISBN 9781857549799.
- The Orchard: Poems. Boa. 2004. ISBN 9781929918485.
- Song: Poems. Boa. 1995. ISBN 9781880238134.
- To the Place of Trumpets. Yale University Press. 1988. ISBN 9780300041507.

=== Chapbooks ===
- Iskandariya. Illustrator Briony Morrow-Cribbs. 2007.
- Black Swan. Harold Kyle. 2005.
- Mt. Angel. University of Oregon. 1983.

=== Anthologies ===
- Michael Collier; Stanley Plumly, eds. (1999). "The Garden of the Trumpet Tree". The New Bread Loaf Anthology of Contemporary American Poetry. UPNE. ISBN 978-0-87451-950-1.
- Susan Aizenberg; Erin Belieu; Jeremy Countryman, eds. (2001). "Song". The Extraordinary Tide: New Poetry by American Women. Columbia University Press. ISBN 978-0-231-11962-7.
- Roger Weingarten; Richard Higgerson, eds. (2001). "Black Swan". Poets of the New Century. David R. Godine. ISBN 978-1-56792-177-9.
- Bill Henderson, ed. (2003). Pushcart Prize XXVII: Best of the Small Presses. Pushcart Press. ISBN 978-1-888889-35-2.
- Bill Henderson, ed. (2004). The Pushcart Prize XXIX 2005: Best of the Small Presses. W. W. Norton & Company. ISBN 978-1-888889-39-0.
- Paul Muldoon; David Lehman, eds. (2008). "The Wolf". The Best American Poetry 2005. Simon and Schuster. ISBN 978-0-7432-5738-1.
