= The Undressing =

2018 poetry collection by Li-Young Lee

The Undressing: Poems
- Author: Li-Young Lee
- Publisher: W. W. Norton & Company
- Publication date: February 20, 2018
- Pages: 96
- ISBN: 978-0393065435
- Preceded by: Behind My Eyes
- Followed by: The Invention of the Darling

The Undressing is a 2018 poetry collection by Li-Young Lee, published by W. W. Norton & Company. His fifth collection, it was Lee's first book in a decade since his 2008 release, Behind My Eyes.

== Contents and background ==
Taking over a decade to write, Lee said he wrote the book to meet a deadline rather than because he felt a completeness in the book's materials. For Chicago, Lee said "I still don’t possess the knowledge to finish it—about myself, about the world, about the nature of writing and perception and politics." In another interview, NPR noted the inside jacket of the book as stating that the book "attempts to uncover things hidden since the dawn of the world." When asked to elaborate, Lee stated:

"I guess, you know, when one writes poetry, you enter into a relationship with the logos ... And when we write poems, we enter into a relationship—a deep relationship—with the logos, the word and with the dynamism of opposites, you know, meaning and nonsense, chaos and order and form and void. So it seems to me that when we write poems, we are trying to access or understand those deep laws. So that's what I meant, I guess."

The book's poems span topics like love, divinity, and family, specifically Lee's father who was a political prisoner in Indonesia for a year. In many of his poems, Lee addresses his family's history of experiencing and fleeing persecution. In NPR, Lee explained: "my father was a political prisoner. And the reason he was kept safe was because of the stories he told. He had a gift for storytelling." Lee later said that he inherited his family stories from his older brother and sister. With regard to his usage of divine imagery, specifically the divine feminine, Lee elaborated that "I’ve always known or felt or intuited that the great feminine, the goddess, was where a lot of wisdom was going to come. The figure of Sophia, the wisdom aspect of God, and the figure Mary in the Christian tradition, or Guanyin, the goddess of mercy—these figures have always been really important to me."

== Critical reception ==
Dan Chiasson in The New Yorker observed the intense passion of Lee's poetry, stating "I have to be in the right mood to read Lee, whose passions do not always survive as poems. It’s the same problem I have, in the less ecstatic hours, with certain poems by Rilke, one of Lee’s primary influences: a poetry that attests to euphoria doesn’t automatically convey it." Ultimately, Chiasson admired Lee's "power" in articulating more abstract subjects like "love and death, peace and rivalry" but specifically found his writing on love to be nebulous.

Major Jackson, in a review for Poets.org, said the book "unequivocally aims for passionate, pure, and enchanted speech, taking the lyric poem as more than a vessel for perfunctory, manufactured feeling". Jackson then went on to analyze several of Lee's poems through Lee's recognized themes of love and divinity, likening him to Pablo Neruda.

John S. O'Connor reviewed the book for Ploughshares. O'Connor paid close attention to Lee's family history, interpreting the poetry collection to be "like memoir". Ultimately, he concluded that "Lee is clearly wary of the limits of language. Perhaps this is why his language in this collection is so syncretic, so wildly alive and allusive with references to anime, science fiction, the Hebrew Bible, Gnosticism, Shakespeare, hip-hop and the gospel of John. The result is a masterpiece."

Jason Myer's review for The Adroit Journal also paid close attention to Lee's family history and how Lee writes poetry in relation to it. Myers stated that "His poetry is haunted by family and world history, and also demonstrates tremendous tenderness for both." Again, Myers observed a possible likeness to Rilke but also "the compressed, ideogrammatic lucidity of classical Asian poetry, as well as the oracular expansiveness of prophets ranging from Isaiah to Whitman."

Sam Leon, writing for Tupelo Quarterly, opened by saying that "The humility with which Lee contemplates life on large and small scales is ever refreshing, a feat that Lee has mastered in his work over the years." Similar to Chiasson, she noted Lee's similarities as a poet to Rainer Maria Rilke. Ultimately, she found the poetry collection to be "careful and passionate" as well as a "mindful approach" to "the sometimes-horror of realizing our reality".

Other critics were more attentive to Lee's technique. World Literature Today stated that "The sinuous, delicately balanced lines of these poems compel our attention. Lee has earned his place as a preeminent poet of our times." The Rumpus argued in favor of certain poetry lengths: "The longer poems in the collection bookend the text and help frame its ideas regarding God and love—the holy, the erotic, and intimacy. Between these longer poems are two sections of (mostly) shorter pieces. While Lee embraces the longer form, I find him to be at his most effective when writing in a shorter, lyric mode." The Manchester Review said the book was "wide ranging" and showed Lee as "a writer of considerable technical resource."
