= Lincoln Fitzell =

American poet

- Born: April 13, 1903; San Francisco, California
- Died: September 5, 1958 (aged 55); Berkeley, California
- Occupation: American poet

Lincoln H. Fitzell, Jr. (April 13, 1903 – September 5, 1958) was an American poet.

== Life ==
He was born on April 13, 1903, in San Francisco, California, to Edith G. Weck and Lincoln H. Fitzell, Sr. He graduated from Harvard University, and University of California, Berkeley. He was a member of the Poetry Guild, and was a friend of Robert Penn Warren He was a friend of John Conley. He corresponded with Alan Swallow. He was a friend of Harvey Ferguson. He worked as a longshoreman, and married Edith Nichols, in 1928. They had a son.

His work appeared in the Nation, Poetry Saturday Review, The New Republic, Prairie Schooner, Southern Review, Virginia Quarterly Review, New Mexico Quarterly,

== Legacy ==
His papers are at the University of California, Berkeley, and UCLA.

== Awards ==
- 1937/1938 Shelley Memorial Award

== Works ==
=== Poetry ===
- Poems. 1932.
- In Plato's Garden 1929–1939. A. Swallow. 1940.
- Morning rise, and other poems. Swallow and Critchlow. 1942.
- Selected poems. A. Swallow. 1955.

=== Stories ===
- County lines: stories and songs of the West. Swallow Press. 1947.
- The Sword and the Dragon. s.n. 1951.

=== Anthology ===
- Alfred Kreymborg, ed. (1935). An anthology of American poetry: lyric America 1630–1930. Tudor publishing co.
- Helen Hoyt, ed. (1932). California poets: an anthology of 244 contemporaries. H. Harrison.
