= Ridgely Torrence =

American poet and journalist (1874–1950)

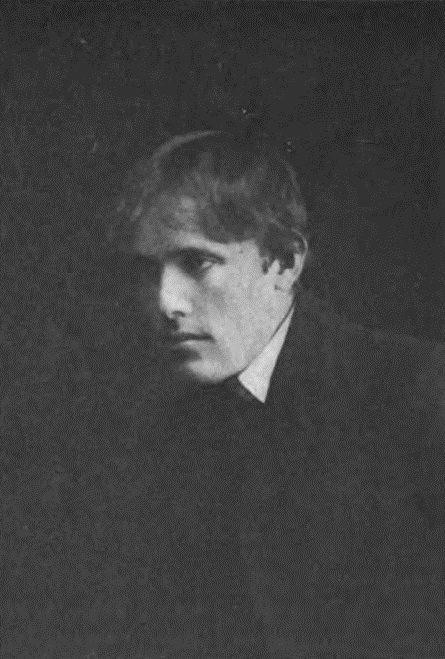
- Born: Frederic Ridgely Torrence; November 27, 1874; Xenia, Ohio, U.S.
- Died: December 25, 1950 (aged 76); New York City, U.S.
- Education: Miami University; Princeton University
- Occupations: Poet; editor
- Spouse: Olivia Howard Dunbar (m. 1914)
- Parent(s): David Findley Torrence; Mary Susan Ridgely
- Writing career
- Notable awards: Shelley Memorial Award (1942)

Frederic Ridgely Torrence (November 27, 1874 – December 25, 1950) was an American poet and editor. He received the Shelley Memorial Award in 1942 and the Academy of American Poets' Fellowship in 1947.

== Early life and education ==
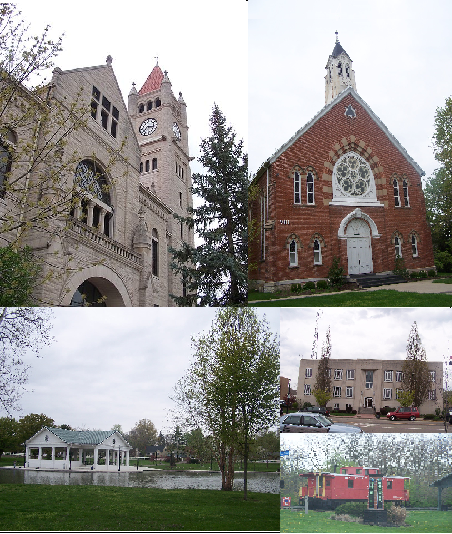
Greene County Courthouse, Collier Chapel, Shawnee Park, Xenia City Hall, B&O Railroad Caboose

Born on November 27, 1874, in Xenia, Ohio, Torrence was the eldest child of Captain David Findley Torrence and Mary Ridgely Torrence. (Note: His father's name is also expressed as Findley David Torrences.) His father was a lumber dealer. His grandfather, John Torrence, founded Xenia and Lexington, Kentucky. He had a brother, Findley McDowell Torrence, who attended Harvard University and married a hometown woman, Patricia Broadstone.

He had tutors while he was growing up and attended Miami University in Oxford, Ohio, from 1893 to 1895 and transferred to Princeton University. He withdrew from Princeton after he suffered an illness that prevented him from returning to school in 1896.

== Career ==
=== Early career ===
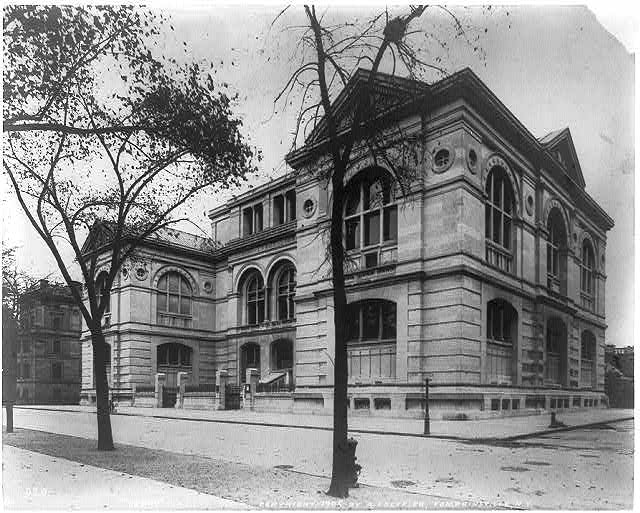
Lenox Library, view from the corner of Fifth Avenue and 70th Street

In the late 1890s he settled in Greenwich Village, in New York City, working as a librarian at the Astor Library from 1897 to 1901, and then at Lenox Library until 1903. He was assistant editor at The Critic from 1903 to 1904. He worked for the Japanese special envoy to the United States as a secretary in 1905. He was the fiction editor at Cosmopolitan magazine, from 1905 to 1907.

=== Poet and playwright ===
During his early year in New York, he became part of a circle of poets that included E. A. Robinson, William Vaughn Moody, and Robert Frost. In 1900, he published The House of a Hundred Lights, which Edmund Clarence Stedman helped him revise.

The verse plays, showing the influence of John Millington Synge, showed realistic portrayals of African Americans, and a revolt against their station in society. While his verse dramas were published as books, they were not produced as plays.

In 1914, his one-act play Granny Maumee, which was first performed by a white cast, helped create opportunities for black actors in theaters in America when it was produced with black actors in 1917. It was "one of the first opportunities for serious black actors". Torrence's collection of plays, Three Plays for a Negro Theater premiered in 1917, as a production of the Negro Players. His work was noteworthy in its blending of compassion and strength.

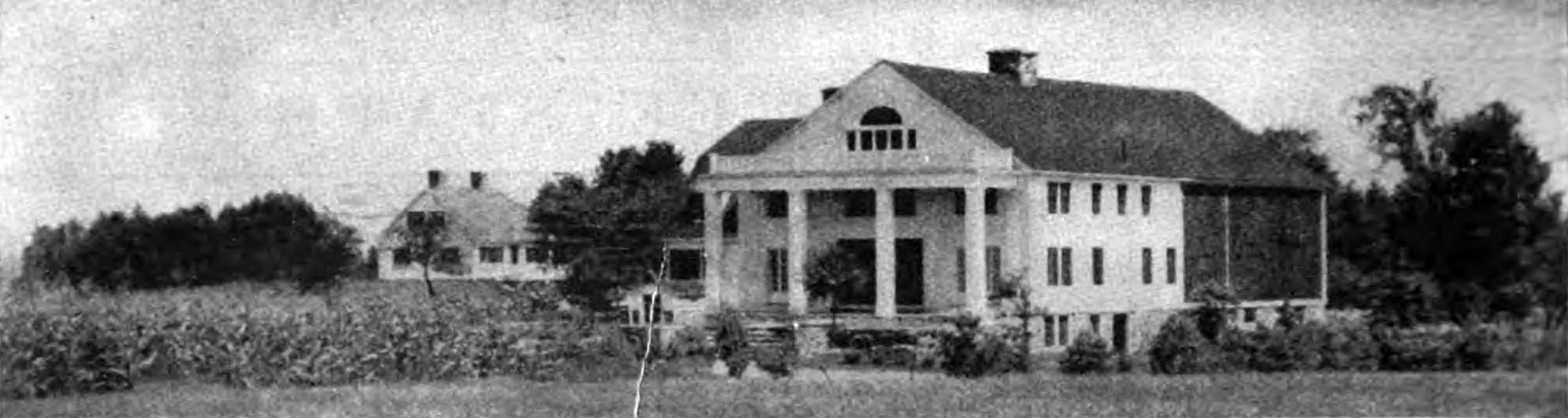
The Colony Hall and the Sigma Alpha Iota Cottage (unfinished at the time), 1921, MacDowell Colony

Torrence had fellowships to MacDowell Colony, the artist colony, in 1914, 1917, and then every year from 1942 to 1950. In 1938, he was poet in residence at Antioch College and in 1941 to 1942, he was Fellow in Creative Writing at Miami University.

He was poetry editor of The New Republic (1920–33), mentoring Louise Bogan. He organized the National Survey of the Negro Theater (1939), for the Rockefeller Foundation. The posthumous book Poems, of Torrence's selected poetry, was published in 1952. He chose works that reflected his values, compassion for others, sense of injustice among people, and a faith in mankind.

I trust the people as I trust the stars.
And if they lose the reckoning they will find it,
For they must learn and by their griefs they will,
Must learn to steer themselves, steer or be steered.

— Ridgely Torrence, Lincoln's Dream

=== Awards ===
- 1942 Shelley Memorial Award
- 1947 Academy of American Poets' Fellowship

== Personal life ==
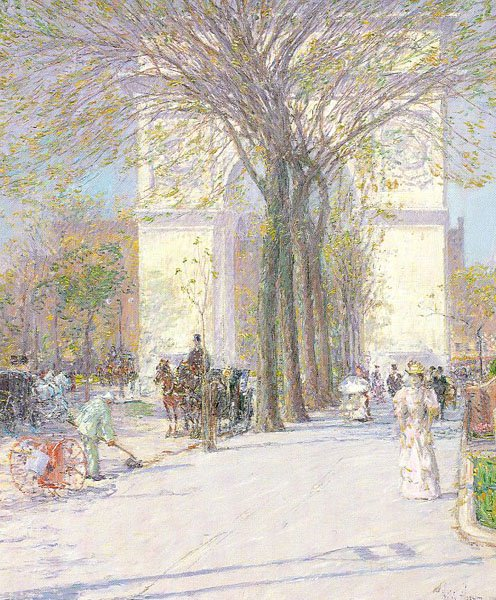
Childe Hassam, Washington Arch, ca. 1893

In 1914, he married author Olivia Howard Dunbar, who was a magazine writer, novelist, and reporter for the New York World. They lived at Washington Square in Lower Manhattan.

Torrence died on December 25, 1950, in New York City. His papers are held at Princeton. Olivia died on January 6, 1953.

== Works ==
=== Poetry ===
- The House of a Hundred Lights. Small, Maynard. 1900.
- Hesperides. The Macmillan Company. 1925.
- Poems. Macmillan. 1941.

=== Theater ===
- Torrence, Ridgely (1903). El Dorado: A Tragedy. John Lane.
- Torrence, Ridgely (1907). Abelard and Heloise: A Drama. C. Scribner's sons.
- Torrence, Ridgely (1917). Granny Maumee, The Rider of Dreams, Simon the Cyrenian: Plays for a Negro Theater. The Macmillan company.

=== Anthologies ===
- Louis Untermeyer, ed. (1941). "The Bird and the Tree". Modern American Poetry.
- Jessie B. Rittenhouse, ed. (1917). "The Lesser Children". The Little Book of Modern Verse.

=== Non-fiction ===
- The story of John Hope. Macmillan Co. 1948.
- Edwin Arlington Robinson (1940). Ridgely Torrence (ed.). Selected letters of Edwin Arlington Robinson. The Macmillan company.
