= Julia Randall =

American poet

- Born: June 15, 1923; Baltimore, Maryland, U.S.
- Died: May 22, 2005 (aged 81); North Bennington, Vermont, U.S.
- Writing career
- Genre: Poetry

Julia Randall (June 15, 1923 – May 22, 2005) was an American poet, professor, and environmental activist. She published seven books of poetry culminating in The Path to Fairview: New and Selected Poems (Louisiana State University Press, 1992) and was the recipient of many honors for her poetry. Described as “one of America's purest and most original lyric poets” (Ploughshares, Spring 2009, Vol. 35, No.1), her honors include the Shelley Memorial Award of the Poetry Society of America (1980), the Poets’ Prize (1988) for her book Moving in Memory, as well as grants from the National Endowment of the Arts (1966, 1982) and the National Institute of Arts & Letters (1968), and a Sewanee Review Fellowship (1957).

== Biography ==
=== Early years and education ===
Julia Randall was born June 15, 1923, in Baltimore, Maryland. She attended Calvert School, and later Bryn Mawr School, graduating in 1941; in 1945 she received a B.A. in English from Bennington College in Vermont. After a year of medical school, a job as technician at the Harvard Biological Laboratory, she returned to Baltimore, poetry and an M.A. (1950) from Johns Hopkins University.

=== Personal life and academic career ===
In 1952, she married Kenneth Sawyer, art critic for the Baltimore Sun and the Paris Tribune; they divorced in 1962. She taught at the evening school of the Johns Hopkins University (1950–1952), the Paris Branch of the University of Maryland (1952–1953), the Peabody Conservatory (1957–58), and Towson State (1958–1962). In 1962 she joined the English faculty at Hollins College, serving first as an assistant professor, and from 1966 as associate professor, teaching there for eleven years before retiring to write full-time. She was the only woman member of the English Department; among her students were notable writers Lee Smith and Annie Dillard, for whom Randall was an important model as teacher, and, in Dillard's words, as a “woman who has committed her life to her art” (quoted by Nancy Parrish in Lee Smith, Annie Dillard and the Hollins Group, LSU, 1999). During those years, she wrote reviews for the Baltimore Evening Sun and the Hollins Critic, published the first four of her seven books of poetry, won her first National Endowment for the Arts Fellowship (1966), a National Institute of Arts and Letters grant (1968), and, already a revered poet in Baltimore, was gaining national recognition. As U.S. Poet Laureate Howard Nemerov wrote of her 1965 book, The Puritan Carpenter: “I had been getting glumly used to the notion that lyrical poetry was over for the present…And then came this beautiful collection…’Praise to the end!’”

In 1973, she retired from teaching to write full time, moving to Glen Arm, Maryland, where she also became an environmental activist, helping to establish preservation ordinances for the Long Green Valley; this devotion to and deep acquaintance with the natural world was echoed in her poetry, as was her resistance to the land's desecration by developers. During those years she published three more books, including Moving in Memory (1987), for which she received the inaugural Poets’ Prize, an annual award given by a panel of leading American poets. In that same year, personal connections and Vermont's commitment to environmental activism drew her (with her perennial pair of terriers) back to North Bennington, where she settled permanently.

During her years there, though she read at The Library of Congress and San Francisco State University, she made relatively few public appearances; she had, as well, a principled aversion to self-promotion, “she did not bend to literary fashion…her poetry does not fit comfortably—or at all—among the “schools” that squared off against each other…” (Meg Schoerke, Mezzo Cammin, 2005)––all of which kept her work from being better known. Nevertheless, she was reviewed and admired by many of her peers, received the Percy Bysshe Shelley Memorial Award of The Poetry Society of America for the body of her work in 1980, a second National Endowment for the Arts fellowship in 1982.

She was regularly published in leading journals: Poetry, The Kenyon Review, The Sewanee Review, The American Poetry Review, Ploughshares, The Southern Poetry Review, and The American Scholar. Her poems appeared in various anthologies, including Poesia Americana del dopoguerra, Ed. Rizzardi, Schwarz (Milan, 1958); Borestone Mountain Best Poems of 1964, Pacific Books (1965); The Hollins Poets, ed. Louis Rubin, Virginia (1967); Hero's Way, Ed. John A. Allen, Prentice-Hall (1971); The Women Poets in English, ed. Ann Stanford, McGraw-Hill (1972); No More Masks! An Anthology of Poems by Women, eds. Florence Howe and Ellen Bass, Doubleday (1973); I Sing the Song of Myself, ed. David Kerdia, Morrow (1978); Contemporary Southern Poetry: An Anthology, eds., Guy Owen, Mary C. Williams, Louisiana State University Press (1979); and Don’t Leave Hungry: Fifty Years of Southern Poetry Review, ed. James Smith, University of Arkansas Press (2009).

On May 22, 2005, she died at her Bennington home from heart disease at the age of 81. The Julia Randall papers (1930–2001) can be found in the Special Collections of the Hollins University Library.

== Poetry ==
Three themes recur in the many reviews of Julia Randall's work: the exceptional musicality of her lyric poetry, the anti-Romantic and more intimate way in which she approaches nature than her forebears, and the wit and intellect with which she combines the personal and the perennial, putting the Western literary tradition to her own anti-traditional uses.

Of her lyricism, Mary Kinzie has said that Randall writes “ a free verse as exact and rhythmic as fugue,” and poet Eleanor Wilner writes: “…Julia Randall's free verse has a long training of the ear behind it, and her cadenced, contrapuntal music is all the livelier for being free to play without fixed constraints—an aural music accompanied by another: the deep referential music of recurring emblematic figures whose names send resonant echoes down the otherwise silent corridors of time.” (Mezzo Cammin, 2005). R.H.W. Dillard describes this imaginative reach across time and scale when he calls her poems “highly charged entities in which the arcane and the archaic are alloyed with metaphysical passion into an active communion with the colloquial and the immediate.” (“Randall, Julia,” Encyclopedia.com).

Of the originality and intellectual challenge of Randall's poetry, the way it changes the deep sources it draws from, Meg Schoerke (Mezzo Cammin, 2005) writes: “…Randall succeeds in being both traditional and radically anti-traditional in her poetry…[her] work often probes the Tradition upon which it rests…by engaging the Tradition from a female point-of view, Randall both creates a space for herself and also exposes the male poets’ limitations or blind sides…Setting herself against Wordsworth's ‘egotistical sublime,’ Randall strives to achieve humility before Nature…”

Of Julia Randall's rejection of the tradition's separation from (and assumed superiority over) nature, Marilyn Hacker writes: “I have read few contemporary poets whose love and attention for the natural world so clearly integrated and included the thinking human creature, and human artifact, especially language, with that world (“The Trees Win Every Time,” Unauthorized Voices, 2010). In the clarifying words of Randall herself, “the poet's job, strangely enough, is to ‘unwrite’ by going back to the beginning; to make such speech as we have faithful to ‘things as they are’ rather than to our arrangements of them; to make language live by confronting things with the ‘innocent’ mind of an Adam, by naming them to themselves afresh through the powers of that mind which is somehow continuous with them.” (“Genius of the Shore: The Poetry of Howard Nemerov” by Julia Randall in The Sounder Few: Essays from the Hollins Critic, eds. Dillard, Garrett, Moore, Athens, GA, U of Georgia Press, 1971, p. 345)

=== Critical commentary ===
John Dorsey of the Baltimore Sun described her as "one of the most intellectual poets of the 20th century."

Moira Egan said, "Her poetry is lean and spare.... She used a quiet care to describe the landscape of Maryland and the interior landscape of her own memory, her sense of loss and her own mortality."

== Poetry collections ==
- The Solstice Tree (Contemporary Poetry: Baltimore, MD, 1952)
- Mimic August (Contemporary Poetry: Baltimore, MD, 1960)
- The Puritan Carpenter (University of North Carolina Press: Raleigh, NC, 1965)
- Adam's Dream (Alfred A. Knopf: New York, NY, 1969)
- The Farewells (Elpenor Books: Chicago, IL, 1981)
- Moving in Memory (Louisiana State University Press: Baton Rouge, LA, 1987)
- The Path to Fairview, New and Selected Poems (Louisiana State University Press: Baton Rouge, LA, 1992)
