= David Ignatow =

American poet and editor (1914–1977)

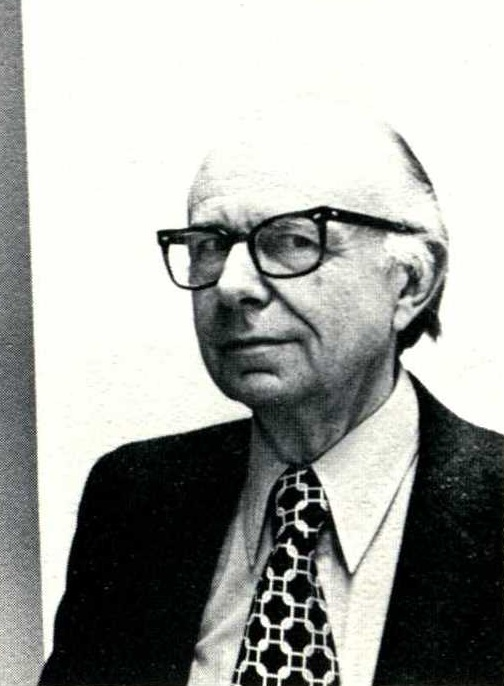
- From the 1973 York College/CUNY Yearbook
- Born: February 7, 1914; New York City, U.S.
- Died: November 17, 1997 (age 83 years); East Hampton, New York, U.S.
- Occupation: Poet
- Writing career
- Genre: Poetry

David Ignatow (February 7, 1914 – November 17, 1997) was an American poet and editor.

== Life ==
David Ignatow was born in Brooklyn, New York on February 7, 1914, and spent most of his life in the New York City area. His parents were Jewish immigrants from Austria-Hungary and Ukraine. He died on November 17, 1997, aged 83, at his home in East Hampton, New York. His papers are held at University of California, San Diego.

Ignatow began his professional career as a businessman. After committing wholly to poetry, Ignatow worked as an editor of, among other periodicals, the American Poetry Review and the Beloit Poetry Journal, and as poetry editor of The Nation.

He taught at the New School for Social Research, the University of Kentucky, the University of Kansas, Vassar College, York College (CUNY), New York University, and Columbia University. He was president of the Poetry Society of America from 1980 to 1984 and poet-in-residence at the Walt Whitman Birthplace Association in 1987.

== Awards ==
Ignatow's many honors include a Bollingen Prize, two Guggenheim fellowships, the John Steinbeck Award, and a National Institute of Arts and Letters award "for a lifetime of creative effort." He received the Shelley Memorial Award (1966), the Frost Medal (1992), and the William Carlos Williams Award (1997) of the Poetry Society of America.

== Bibliography ==
- Living Is What I Wanted: Last Poems (BOA Editions, 1999)
- At My Ease: Uncollected Poems of the Fifties and Sixties (1998)
- I Have a Name (1996)
- The End Game and Other Stories (1996)
- Against the Evidence: Selected Poems, 1934–1994 (1994)
- Despite the Plainness of the Day: Love Poems (1991)
- Shadowing the Ground (1991)
- If We Knew (Polymorph Editions, 1991)
- New and Collected Poems, 1970–1985 (1986)
- Leaving the Door Open (1984)
- Whisper to the Earth (1981)
- Conversations (1980)
- Sunlight (1979)
- Tread the Dark (1978)
- Selected Poems (1975)
- Facing the Tree (1975)
- Poems: 1934–1969 (1970)
- Rescue the Dead (1968)
- Earth Hard: Selected Poems (1968)
- Figures of the Human (1964)
- Say Pardon (1962)
- The Gentle Weightlifter (1955)
- Poems (Decker Press, 1948)
