= Behind My Eyes =

2008 poetry collection by Li-Young Lee

- Author: Li-Young Lee
- Publisher: W. W. Norton & Company
- Publication date: January 17, 2008
- Awards: 144
- ISBN: 978-0393065428
- Preceded by: Book of My Nights
- Followed by: The Undressing

Behind My Eyes is a 2008 poetry collection by Li-Young Lee. It is Lee's third book of poetry and fourth book overall.

== Contents ==
For much of his later life, Lee has lived in Chicago, including during the writing of Behind My Eyes. In Poets & Writers Magazine, Lee said that he's "trying always to escape the city" as he feels estranged from nature and too immersed in humanity, the latter of which he is always actively trying to surpass as a poet. He said, however, that the city ultimately provokes him to "attempt to move toward a greater, deeper interior."

Accordingly, many of the poems invoke the Christian god, speaking both directly to him or speaking as though he were in the background, a fundamental assumption of the universe wherein Lee's speakers inhabit. When asked about his specific motivation for Behind My Eyes, Lee said "I just wanted to go to a deeper understanding, a deeper music, deeper arguments with God, deeper encounters with God. I wanted to ask deeper questions."

Asked about the poem "Virtues of a Boring Husband", a poem where a husband speaks to his wife as to help her fall asleep, Lee said: "My sense is that poem meditates on paired-ness, the dyad, two-ness. When the speaker is talking about God, he’s also talking about the two-ness of the mind and God. And there’s the lover and the beloved. It’s that two-ness I’m curious about, where the mind meets its source, which is God."

Of the poem "God Seeks a Destiny", Lee describes a child who has climbed a tree and peers through the window of his house to see his father playing a game of "hide and seek" with the Christian god and his many names. Lee told Image that the experience actually happened to him and that he, as a child, was much too afraid to climb back down. Ever since, the moment has been particularly instructive for him in his understanding of faith: "I look back a lot on that terror of being up that high, suspended between heaven and earth, and I think that’s what my relationship with God has been."

== Critical reception ==
In a starred review, Publishers Weekly observed Lee talking about immigrants and refugees, a "timely" driver for the poems; the reviewer additionally saw "Biblical allusions" and "evangelical Christian beliefs" articulated on behalf of Lee's father. Ultimately, the reviewer found Lee's poems to be both concise and clear.

Henry Hughes, writing for the Harvard Review, cited Gerald Stern's preface to Lee's first book, stating that Stern's assessment of Lee as "a young poet of humility and plain speech who invited the sublime" was still accurate two decades later. Hughes then went on to observe Lee's family history—one of "political terror"—and commended him for conveying them without relying on "the sentimental or shocking" insofar as "Lee doesn't own and lease his suffering, he shares it as if these were also our parents."

Kristina Marie Darling, in Rattle, observed how Lee's writing on identity was necessarily bifurcated by him being both an immigrant from China and Indonesia to the United States. Darling wrote:

"Lee’s newest work examines the many contradictions inherent in the immigrant experience, depicting them in spare, lyrical narratives throughout. Often juxtaposing thoughtful observations on identity and family with Western attempts to commercialize and quantify, Lee’s poems convey the difficulty of negotiating one’s heritage with American cultural values, proving at once philosophical and grounded in everyday life."

For the Valparaiso Literary Review, Hila Ratzabi saw the book as being charted on two axes: a horizontal axis of time and a vertical axis of "the realm of dream" which, in Ratzabi's articulation, was one devoid of time. Through these axes, Ratzabi saw a "duality of being" at their intersection where Lee's poems tend to reside. In sum, "Lee does not merely peer at the edge of the unknown; he enters it, as though it were a familiar room in a childhood home, and returns to report. Confounding dichotomy, Lee calls into question the division between beginning/end, birth/death, past/future, man/woman, body/mind. Borders melt; language opens."
