= Jeremy Ingalls =

American poet

- Born: April 2, 1911
- Died: March 16, 2000 (aged 88); Tucson, Arizona
- Education: Tufts College; University of Chicago
- Occupations: Poet; scholar

Mildred Dodge Jeremy Ingalls (April 2, 1911 - March 16, 2000) was an American poet and scholar of Chinese literature.

In 1943, she received a Guggenheim Fellowship to work on her major poem, The Thunder Saga of Tahi, which was published in 1945 by Alfred Knopf.

== Life ==
Ingalls grew up in Gloucester, Massachusetts. She received both her bachelor's and master's degrees from Tufts College and studied Chinese at the University of Chicago. From 1948 to 1960, she taught at Rockford College as Resident Poet and Professor of Asian Studies and served as head of the English Department. She then taught at Western College for Women in Oxford, Ohio.

She had a foster son, Yong-ho Ch'oe.

After Ingalls's death in 2000, Allen Wittenborn, who had met her when he was a graduate student at University of Arizona, later returned to her papers in the archives there. From nearly fifty boxes of her papers he edited the volume Dragon in Ambush: The Art of War in the Poems of Mao Zedong (2013), a translation and explication of 20 of Mao's earliest published poems. A reviewer called the volume "an extraordinary work, so full of information that it seems bursting at its roughly 500-page seams. This is not an entirely good thing, because the information provided, while often rich and resonant, is also frequently far-fetched and the assemblage of contents is somewhat unusual."

Her papers are archived at several institutions: the University of Chicago, the University of Delaware, and the University of Arizona.

== Awards ==
- 1941: Yale Series of Younger Poets prize for The Metaphysical Sword
- 1943: Guggenheim Fellowship
- 1950/1951: Shelley Memorial Award
- American Academy of Arts and Letters Fellowship
- Ford Foundation Fellowship
- Rockefeller Foundation Fellowship

== Works ==
=== Poetry ===
- Symbols for These Times. The Press of Flozari. 1940.
- The Metaphysical Sword. Yale University Press. 1941. 2nd edition AMS Press, 1971
- The Thunder Saga of Tahl. A.A. Knopf. 1945.
- The Woman From the Island. H. Regnery Co. 1958.
- These Islands Also. C. E. Tuttle Co. 1959.
- This Stubborn Quantum. Capstone Editions. 1983. ISBN 978-0-9610662-0-8.
- Selected Poems. Kore Press, Inc. 2007. ISBN 978-1-888553-24-6.

=== Non-fiction ===
- A Book of Legends. Harcourt, Brace and Company. 1941.
- The Galilean Way: A Book for Modern Skeptics. Longmans, Green & Co. 1953.
- Dragon in Ambush: The Art of War in the Poems of Mao Zedong. compiled and edited by Allen Wittenborn. Lanham, MD.: Lexington Books. 2013. ISBN 978-0-7391-7782-2.

=== Essays ===
- The Epic Tradition and Related Essays. Capstone Editions. 1989. ISBN 978-0-9610662-4-6.

=== Translations ===
- Chien-nung Li; Jiannong Li; Ssŭ-yü Têng (1956). Ssŭ-yü Têng (ed.). The Political History of China, 1840-1928. Translated by Jeremy Ingalls. Stanford University Press. ISBN 978-0-8047-0602-5.
- Yao Hsin-nung (1970). The Malice of Empire. Translated by Jeremy Ingalls. University of California Press. ISBN 978-0520015609.
