= Herbert Bruncken =

American poet, and magazine editor (born 1896)

Herbert Gerhard Bruncken
- Born: September 21, 1896 Milwaukee, Wisconsin, US
- Occupation: Poet and magazine editor
- Genre: Poetry

Herbert Gerhard Bruncken (born September 21, 1896, date of death unknown) was an American poet, and magazine editor.

== Life ==
Bruncken was born in Milwaukee on September 21, 1896.

Bruncken lived in Wisconsin.

Bruncken sent contributions for the Smart Set to H. L. Mencken.

Bruncken was editor of Minaret magazine in Washington, D. C., from 1911 to 1926, with Shaemus O. Sheele, and Harold Hersey.

== Awards ==
- 1939/1940 Shelley Memorial Award

== Works ==
=== Poetry ===
- "A Wind from Spain". Contemporary Verse. 1918.
- "The Tide". The Midland. 1918.
- Hall bedroom. W. Drey. 1936.
- The long night. Muscatine, Iowa: The Prairie press. 1939.
- Last parade. Muscatine, Ia.: The Prairie Press. 1938.
- Noise in Time. Prairie City, Ill.: Decker Press. 1949.
- Hue and Cry; poems, 1941. Muscatine, Ia.: The Prairie Press. 1941.

=== Non-fiction ===
- Subject Index to Poetry, Chicago, ALA, 1940.
