= The Invention of the Darling =

2024 poetry collection by Li-Young Lee

- Author: Li-Young Lee
- Publisher: W. W. Norton & Company
- Publication date: May 14, 2024
- Pages: 144
- ISBN: 978-0393867190
- Preceded by: The Undressing

The Invention of the Darling is a 2024 poetry collection by American poet Li-Young Lee, published by W. W. Norton & Company.

== Contents and background ==
The book is Lee's first poetry collection in six years since his last, The Undressing, from 2018; his very first, Rose, was published in 1986. The Invention of the Darling's poems tackle similar subject matter to what Lee's poetry has been known for: "family, exile, intimacy, and the divine." Through the figure of the beloved, Lee's poems consider spirituality, divinity, love, and mortality in relationship to the universe writ large.

In an interview with Electric Literature, Lee was asked whether he was still interested in "trying to stand with" the influences he named three decades ago, namely Walt Whitman and Herman Melville, among others. Now in his sixties, Lee said:

"I want God to speak through me. I’m tired of my own voice. I’m tired of me. I’m tired of all my own schemes, all my egos and machinations. I’m tired of being lost. I’m tired of following my ego. I’m tired of the whole thing. I just want God to live my life. I want God to speak those poems."

== Critical reception ==
In a starred review, Publishers Weekly called the book "exhilarating" with regard to its "journey into the sacred" and said "In his most overtly mystical book to date, Lee achieves a bracing radiance." Also in a starred review, BookPage said "Lee balances the grandest revelations of the universe with the gentle touch of personal memory."

Critics observed Lee's relationship to the divine. The New Yorker, in a briefly noted review, saw themes of "dream, myth, and memory in unabashed pursuit of the sublime" and paid special attention to Lee's sense of devotion through his poems. Ed Simon, for the Poetry Foundation, offered a similar attention, stating "Lee evinces a venerable cosmology that sees the largest things as intrinsically related to the smallest, a kaleidoscopic Russian nesting doll model of reality". Leonora Simonovis, also for the Poetry Foundation, said "Love—for the world, for life, and for what lies beyond human comprehension—is the driving force behind Lee’s poems, which meditate on mortality and on the mysteries of life as they are manifest in nature."

== Cover ==
Lee stated that the book's cover is "the image of Yin-Yang" or "the tantric Buddhist image of the union, the male and the female in conjugation, staring into each other's eyes ... out of that encounter, the whole world manifests."
