= Hubert Creekmore =

American poet and writer

Hubert Creekmore (16 January 1907 – 23 May 1966) was an American poet and writer from the small Mississippi town of Water Valley. Creekmore was born into one of the oldest Southern families of the area but he would grow up to embody ideals very different from the conservative Southern principles by which he was raised.

== Education ==
Creekmore studied at the University of Mississippi and graduated from Ole Miss in 1927. He then went on to study drama at the University of Colorado and play writing at Yale University with George Pierce Baker. In 1940, he was awarded a Master's degree in American literature from Columbia University.

After finishing his education, he was sent to serve in the Navy during World War II. He actively served in the Pacific for three years. Some of his earlier works as a poet (such as The Long Reprieve) were written while he was stationed in the Pacific.

== Life and writings ==
Due to the fact that he was a closeted homosexual, Creekmore experienced conflict regarding living in Mississippi. He felt that Mississippi was not a proper environment for a poet such as himself and that the cultural depravity of rural, small-town Mississippi would not allow him to reach his full potential as a literary artist.

He worked for the Mississippi Highway Department while he also wrote scripts for local theatrical productions. During the Great Depression, he was able to involve himself with the Federal Writers' Project, a program created by Franklin Roosevelt to help support writers during the economic downturn. The program also encouraged writers to compile local literature and folklore, much like the Brothers Grimm had done in Germany almost a century before.

Although Creekmore thought Mississippi a bit droll, he did have a circle of educated friends with whom he could associate. The closest and most important among these was the famous Mississippian author Eudora Welty, who was related to him by a marriage in the family. He often discussed literature with Eudora, especially concerning the role of women in the rural South. Creekmore was under the impression that women hindered themselves in society by molding themselves to a standard which women of the time believed men desired. Eudora, on the other hand, felt that male dominance in society played a bigger part.

Creekmore, Eudora, and a few of their close friends formed a small club whose entire purpose was to sit up at night, watching the cereus flower bloom, meanwhile discussing the literary arts. It was called The Night-Blooming Cereus Club. Local people who planted the flower would often invite the club to their houses, sometimes going as far as printing the invites in their local newspapers.

Creekmore eventually made the decision to move to New York in an effort to further his career.

During his time in New York he served as an editor, a literary agent for publishing company New Directions, who also published fellow Mississippian Tennessee Williams, an author, a critic, a translator, a librettist, and a poet. Not only did he write, he was also quite musical, sometimes playing the piano with singers to entertain his friends at parties, at such parties he was described by one friend as being an avid bourbon drinker.

Creekmore wrote mainly about the situation of white Mississippians in the grip of religious fundamentalism and of black Mississippians under the strictures of the Jim Crow laws. He also wrote about the theme of homosexuality and marriage in the South. Most homosexual men in the South chose to marry and keep their sexual preference hidden from the world so that they would not be ostracized by the public. Because of the themes which he often chose, he was generally disliked by most Southern readers.

A few examples of his works are The Fingers of Night and The Welcome. In Fingers, Creekmore writes of a southern girl who is dealing with the problems caused by intense religious fervor. The Welcome focuses on the problems gay men in the South have when trying to accept their sexuality.

He was a prolific translator. He translated various works from European languages, but most specifically he worked on classical pieces written in Latin. His most famous translations include the Satires of Decimus Junius Juvenalis, the Erotic Elegies of Albius Tibullus, and Lyrics of the Middle Ages. All of his translations can still be found in print today.

== Death ==
On 23 May 1966, Hubert Creekmore died from a heart attack in a taxi while heading for a flight to Spain. Having few relatives, no children and having lived in New York for so long, his works are scarcely known, even in his native state of Mississippi.

== Selected works ==
The following is a list of his most well known works:

- Personal Sun, the Early Poems of Hubert Creekmore (Decker Press, 1940)
- The Stone Ants (1942)
- The Fingers of the Night (1946)
- The Long Reprieve and Other Poems of New Caledonia (1946)
- Formula (1947)
- The Welcome (1948)
- Erotic Elegies of Albius [Albius Tibullus], with Poems of Sulpicius Arranged as a Sequence Called No Harm to Lovers (1950)
- A Little Treasury of World Poetry: Translations from the Great Poets of Other Languages (1952)
- The Chain in the Heart (1953)
- Lyrics of the Middle Ages (1959)
- Satires of Decimus Junius Juvenalis (1963)
- Daffodils Are Dangerous (1966).

== Works cited ==
- Field, Edward. "Clifford Wright, Painting Yaddo Red." The Gay and Lesbian Review July-Aug. 2004.
- Flora, Joseph M., Amber Vogel, and Brian A. Giemza. Southern Writers: A New Biographical Dictionary. LA: LSU P, W006.
- Howard, John. Men Like That : A Southern Queer History. New York: University of Chicago P, 1999.
- Marrs, Suzanne. One Writer's Imagination : The Fiction of Eudora Welty. New York: Louisiana State UP, 2002.
