= James L. McMichael =

American poet and educator (born 1939)

James L. McMichael (born 1939) is an American poet and educator.

== Life ==
The Pasadena, California native, McMichael received his Ph.D. from Stanford University. In 1970, following the breakup of his first marriage, he married his second wife, Phylinda Wallace, a translator. They later divorced and he remarried. He has three children, Robert, Geoffrey and Owen.

McMichael is a Professor Emeritus in the English department under the School of Humanities at the University of California, Irvine.

"McMichael writes densely; his language is compacted, coiled, sprung (in Hopkins's sense) and highly allusive. It is never simple or straightforward," writes Liz Rosenberg in a Boston Globe review.

Eric McHenry, in a brief review of Capacity in The New York Times, wrote: "Since 1980, his [McMichael's] sole contributions to the genre (excluding a "new and selected") have been three book-length poems, each strikingly different from the others and from anything else on the market. In Capacity, he has exchanged the long lines and explicit autobiography of the previous two for dispassion, elision and lines as short as a syllable."

== Awards ==
His first new poetry collection in a decade, Capacity, was a finalist for the 2006 National Book Award for Poetry.

He has been awarded a Guggenheim Fellowship, a 1995 Whiting Award, the 1999 Arthur Rense Prize, the Shelley Memorial Award, and the Academy of American Poets' Fellowship.

== Books ==
=== Poetry ===
- Against the Falling Evil (Chicago: Swallow Press, 1971), ISBN 0-8040-0552-4
- The Lovers Familiar (Boston: David R. Godine, 1978), ISBN 0-87923-175-0
- Four Good Things (Boston: Houghton Mifflin, 1980), ISBN 0-395-29913-6, "a sprawling autobiographical meditation on life, death, and real-estate, set in [...] Southern California"
- Each in a Place Apart (Chicago: University of Chicago Press, 1994), ISBN 0-226-56106-2
- The World at Large: New and Selected Poems, 1971-1996, (Chicago: University of Chicago Press, 1996), ISBN 0-226-56104-6
- Capacity (New York: Farrar, Straus and Giroux, 2006), ISBN 0-374-11890-6 seven long poems including “The Begotten”.
- If You Can Tell: Poems (New York: Farrar, Straus and Giroux, 2016) ISBN 978-0-374-17518-4

=== Other ===
- The Style of the Short Poem (Belmont, Calif.: Wadsworth, 1967)
- Just What the Country Needs, Another Poetry Anthology (Belmont, Calif.: Wadsworth, 1971), ISBN 0-534-00137-8, ed. with Dennis Saleh
- Ulysses and Justice (Princeton, N.J.: Princeton University Press, 1991), ISBN 0-691-06547-0, a study of James Joyce
