= Olivia Howard Dunbar =

American short story writer, journalist and biographer (1873–1953)

Olivia Howard Dunbar (1873-January 6, 1953) was an American short story writer, journalist and biographer, best known today for her ghost fiction.

== Life ==
Dunbar was born in West Bridgewater, Massachusetts in 1873. She graduated from Smith College in 1894, after which she worked in newspaper journalism. She worked for the New York World during which time she penned an exposé on Mary Baker Eddy and Christian Science. As a short story writer and critic, she was published in many of the popular periodicals of her time, including Harper's and The Dial. Dunbar wrote several ghost stories, as well as a 1905 essay, "The Decay of the Ghost in Fiction", defending the subgenre. Dunbar was active in the women's suffrage movement, and her work has been noted to contain feminist themes. She married the poet Ridgely Torrence in 1914. Dunbar died in 1953. Her work has been anthologized by Dorothy Scarborough and Jessica Amanda Salmonson.

== Selected works ==
=== Short fiction ===
- The Shell of Sense (1908)
- The Long Chamber (1914)

=== Novels ===
- A House in Chicago (1947)
