= The Book of Light =

1993 poetry collection by Lucille Clifton

- Author: Lucille Clifton
- Publisher: Copper Canyon Press
- Publication date: July 1, 1993
- Pages: 80
- ISBN: 9781556590528

The Book of Light is a 1993 poetry collection by Lucille Clifton, published by Copper Canyon Press. It was reissued in a 30th anniversary edition in 2023 with a foreword from Ross Gay.

== Critical reception ==
Publishers Weekly stated that the book "clearly demonstrates why she was twice nominated for the Pulitzer Prize," calling it "Low key and poignant," specifically with regard to its use of interpersonal discourse and spirituality.

RHINO Poetry, observing Clifton's first-time revelations of having faced sexual violence from her family in the book, stated: "the poems deliver what it’s really like to look back on people whom you love and hate, not at the same time, but in a kind of alternating current. The past is disgusting and pathetic, but it is other things too."

Real Change News called it Clifton's "most political poetry collection" due to its references to the 1985 MOVE bombing among other tragedies faced by the Black community.
