= Fred J. Clifton =

Baltimore activist and educator (1934–1984)

Fred J. Clifton (December 23, 1934 – November 10, 1984) was a Baltimore activist and educator, who helped establish Harvard University's Afro-American Studies Department in the 1960s. He was married to the celebrated poet Lucille Clifton, who wrote the poem “The Death of Fred Clifton” shortly after his untimely death at age 49.

Clifton was born in Dunham, Kentucky, one of 10 children. His family moved to West Virginia, where he was educated. After high school, he served in the United States Marines during the Korean War. He continued his studies at the University of Buffalo, where he graduated with a degree in philosophy and stayed on for graduate school. Clifton met his wife, the former Lucille Sayles, while they were students at the University of Buffalo; they married in 1958.
