= Theodore Weiss (poet) =

American poet (1916–2003)

- Born: Theodore Russell Weiss; December 16, 1916; Reading, Pennsylvania, U.S.
- Died: April 15, 2003 (aged 86); Princeton, New Jersey, U.S.
- Education: Muhlenberg College; Columbia University
- Occupations: Poet; editor
- Spouse: Renee Karol Weiss
- Writing career
- Notable awards: Shelley Memorial Award (1989)

Theodore Russell Weiss (December 16, 1916 Reading, Pennsylvania – April 15, 2003 Princeton, New Jersey) was an American poet, and literary magazine editor.

== Life ==
He graduated from Muhlenberg College in 1938 and Columbia University in 1940. He was an instructor at the University of Maryland, College Park, the University of North Carolina, Yale University, and Bard College. He taught at Princeton University, until retirement in 1987.

He edited (with his wife, Renee Karol Weiss) Quarterly Review of Literature, which published William Carlos Williams, Wallace Stevens, E. E. Cummings, and Ezra Pound.

In 1987, he was the subject of a documentary, Living Poetry: A Year in the Life of a Poem, made by Harvey Edwards.

== Awards ==
- 1956 Wallace Stevens Award
- 1977 Brandeis Creative Arts Award in Poetry
- 1988-89 Poetry Society of America's Shelley Memorial Award
- 1997 Oscar Williams and Gene Durwood Award for Poetry
- 1997 PEN/Nora Magid Lifetime Achievement Award
- Guggenheim fellowship
- Ford Foundation fellowship
- National Foundation of the Arts and Humanities fellowship
- Ingram Merrill Foundation fellowship

== Works ==
=== Poetry ===
- The World Before Us: Poems, 1950-1970 (Macmillan, 1970)
- Fireweeds (Macmillan, 1976),
- A Slow Fuse: New Poems (Macmillan, 1984)
- A Sum of Destructions (Louisiana State University Press, 1995),

=== Essays ===
- The Breath of Clowns and Kings (Atheneum, 1971), a study of Shakespeare's early comedies and histories
- The Man From Porlock: Engagements, 1944-1981 (Princeton University Press, 1982), a collection of essays.

=== Edited ===
- Selections From the Notebooks of Gerard Manley Hopkins (New Directions, 1945).
