= Tom Boggs (poet) =

American poet, editor, and novelist

Thomas Kavanaugh Boggs
- Born: 1905; Allegheny, Pennsylvania
- Died: November 17, 1952 (aged 46–47); National Arts Club, Manhattan, New York
- Occupations: Poet; editor; novelist
- Parent(s): Joseph Crosher Boggs and Alberta Marie (Bonney) Boggs

Tom Boggs (1905 – November 17, 1952) was an American poet, editor, and novelist who emerged as a Greenwich Village Bohemian during the Jazz Age of the 1920s.

== Biography ==
He was born Thomas Kavanaugh Boggs in Allegheny City, Pennsylvania, the son of prominent Pittsburgh doctor, Joseph Crosher Boggs (born 1867), and Alberta Marie (born 1867). He attended Allegheny High School.

Boggs and fellow student Robert Clairmont met in Pittsburgh and became literary friends. Clairmont, a poet who inherited $350,000 under strange circumstances in 1925, left for New York, where he became an extravagant character in the Greenwich Village Bohemian scene and invited Boggs to join him. Boggs recorded many of their wild escapades in a novelized biography called Millionaire Playboy. He also started a short-lived literary journal, bankrolled by Clairmont and launched on April Fools' Day 1927, called New Cow of Greenwich Village (A Monthly Periodical Sold on the Seven Arts as Such).

He began publishing his earliest verse in high school and continued in New York. He was also an editor of many emerging poets in the American literary scene, including Elizabeth Bishop, R.P. Blackmur, John Ciardi, Malcolm Cowley, E.E. Cummings, Kenneth Fearing, Langston Hughes, Robinson Jeffers, Weldon Kees, Muriel Rukeyser, Mark Van Doren, Wallace Stevens, and William Carlos Williams.

Boggs died in 1952 of a heart attack at the National Arts Club while speaking to Percy MacKaye, for whom he was working at the time as a personal secretary. He is buried in Homewood Cemetery in Pittsburgh.

== Selected works ==
- New Cow of Greenwich Village, literary magazine, (New York, 1927)
- Millionaire Playboy: A Delirious and True Extravaganza of Inheriting a Fortune and Squandering It, novel, (New York: The Vanguard Press, 1933)
- 51 Neglected Lyrics, editor, poetry, (New York: The Macmillan Company, 1937)
- Lyric Moderns in Brief, 1300-1938: Complete Lyrics from Longer Poems, Some from Manuscript, editor, poetry, (New York: The Powgen Press, 1938)
- Lyric Moderns in Brief: Some Modern Poets, a Number from Manuscript, editor, poetry, (Prairie City, IL: The Press of James A. Decker, 1940)
- New Poets: An Anthology of Seven Young Contemporary Poets: Tom Boggs, John Ciardi, Robert Clairmont, Minna Gellert, Lucy Kent, E.L. Mayo, Marshall Schacht, editor, poetry, (Prairie City, IL: The Press of James A. Decker, 1941)
- An American Anthology: 67 Poems Now in Anthology Form for the First Time, editor, poetry, (Prairie City, IL: The Press of James A. Decker, 1942)
- American Decade: 68 Poems for the First Time in an Anthology, editor, poetry, (Cummington, MA: The Cummington Press, 1943)
- Arenas, poetry, (New York: Coward-McCann, Inc. 1943)
- The Constant Mistress, poetry, (Baltimore: Contemporary Poetry, 1945)
- Of Love, poetry, (Aldington [Kent]: Hand and Flower Press, 1953)
- In Good Times, poetry, (London: The Bodley Head, 1955)
