= Robert Friend (poet) =

American poet (1913–1998)

- רוברט פרנד
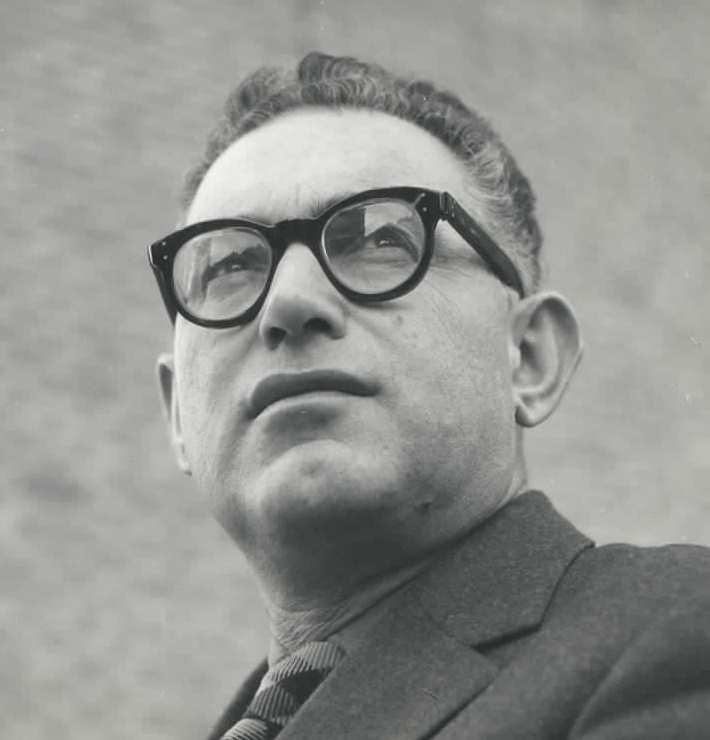
- Born: November 25, 1913; Brooklyn, New York
- Died: January 12, 1998 (aged 84)
- Education: Brooklyn College, Harvard, Cambridge
- Occupations: Poet, translator, lecturer

Robert Friend (Hebrew: רוברט פרנד; November 25, 1913 – January 12, 1998) was an American-born poet and translator. After moving to Israel, he became a professor of English literature at the Hebrew University of Jerusalem.

== Biography ==
Friend was born in 1913 in Brooklyn, New York, to a family of Russian Jewish immigrants. He was the eldest of five children. After studying at Brooklyn College, Harvard and Cambridge, he taught English literature and writing in the U.S., Puerto Rico, Panama, France, England, and Germany. He settled in Israel in 1950, where he lived the rest of his life. He taught English and American Literature at the Hebrew University of Jerusalem for over thirty years. He was well known in Israel as an English-language poet and a translator of Hebrew poetry.

Robert Friend was gay, and his sexuality found expression in his poetry well before the Stonewall era. According to Edward Field in the Greenwood Encyclopedia of American Poetry, Shadow on the Sun is "remarkable in that, for its time, it contains so many poems about the author's homosexuality." Friend's openness continued throughout his writing career.

== Literary career ==
Friend's first published volume of verse was Shadow on the Sun (1941). His last collection of poetry, Dancing with a Tiger: Poems 1941-1998, was published posthumously in 2003. He translated around 800 works from Hebrew, Yiddish, Spanish, French, German, and Arabic. Toby Press published two volumes of his translations in its Hebrew Classics Series: Found in Translation: Modern Hebrew Poets, A Bilingual Edition (2006, Second Revised Edition) and Ra'hel: Flowers of Perhaps (2008, Second Revised Edition). Among the Hebrew poets Friend translated into English are Chaim Nachman Bialik, Rachel, Natan Alterman, Leah Goldberg, Gabriel Preil and Yehuda Amichai.

== Awards and recognition ==
Friend won the Jeannette Sewell Davis Prize (Poetry, Chicago).

== Poetry ==
- Dancing with a Tiger: Poems 1941-1998, Edited by Edward Field, Preface by Gabriel Levin (Menard Press, London, 2003, ISBN 1-881471-21-7)
- After Catullus (The Beth-Shalom Press, Israel, 1997)
- The Next Room (The Menard Press, London, 1995)
- Abbreviations (Etcetera Editions, Israel, 1994)
- Dancing With A Tiger (The Beth-Shalom Press, Israel, 1990)
- Somewhere Lower Down (The Menard Press, London, 1980)
- Selected Poems (Tambimuttu at The Seahorse Press, London, 1976)
- The Practice of Absence (Beth-Shalom Press, Israel, 1971)
- Salt Gifts (The Charioteer Press, Washington, DC, 1964)
- Shadow on the Sun (The Press of James A. Decker, Prairie City, Illinois, 1941)

== Translations ==
- Flowers of Perhaps: Selected Poems of Ra'hel, A Bilingual Edition (The Toby Press, 2008)
- Found in Translation: 20 Hebrew Poets: A Bilingual Edition, Edited and Introduced by Gabriel Levin (The Toby Press, 2006)
- Found in Translation: 100 Years of Modern Hebrew Poetry, Edited and Introduced by Gabriel Levin, Menard Press, 1999 (Poetry Book Society Recommended Translation)
- S.Y. Agnon: The Book Of The Alphabet (The Jewish Publication Society, Philadelphia, 1998)
- Featured Translator, "Palestinian and Israeli Poets," Modern Poetry in Translation, No. 14, Winter 1998–99, Edited by Daniel Weissbort
- Flowers of Perhaps: Selected Poems of Ra'hel (Menard Press, London, 1995)
- Featured Translator, "Second International Poets Festival, Jerusalem," Modern Poetry in Translation, No. 4, Winter 1993–94, Edited by Daniel Weissbort
- Leah Goldberg: Selected Poems (Menard Press, Panjandrum Press, 1976)
- Gabriel Preil: Sunset Possibilities and Other Poems (The Jewish Publication Society, Philadelphia, 1985)
- Natan Alterman: Selected Poems (Hakibbutz Hameuchad Publishing House, Israel, 1978)
- Translation of poem by Natan Alterman in "Mother's Lament", composed by Sharon Farber, performed by the Los Angeles Master Chorale, September 2002
- Translation of poem by Ra'hel in "Women of Valor", composed by Andrea Clearfield

== Seminars ==
- Poetry reading and discussion. "Three Maverick Poets: An Unflinching Exploration of the Lives and Works of Robert Friend, '34, Chester Kallman, '41, and Harold Norse, '38." Discussion leaders: Edward Field, Edward Mendelson, and Regina Weinrich. Sponsored by Brooklyn College, New York, October 27, 2005.

== Radio ==
- Three poems recited by Garrison Keillor in "The Writer's Almanac," January 2003 and January 2004
- "Dreamstreets" program, moderated by Steven Leech, devoted to the poetry of Robert Friend, February 2004 (University of Delaware at Newark)

== Copyright ==
- Robert Friend's copyrights are held by his niece Jean Shapiro Cantu. She can be reached through the Robert Friend Facebook page. His Archives are located at The Brooklyn College Library, Department of Special Collections, and the University of Delaware Library, Department of Special Collections.
