= Shelley Memorial Award =

The Shelley Memorial Award of the Poetry Society of America, was established by the will of Mary P. Sears, and named after the poet Percy Bysshe Shelley. The prize is given to a living American poet selected with reference to genius and need, and was worth between $6,000 and $9,000 in 2015. The selection was made by a jury of three poets: one each appointed by the presidents of Radcliffe and Berkeley, and the third by the Board of Governors of the Society. More recently, the selection has been made by a jury of two: one appointed by the president of Berkeley and the second by the Society.

== Winners ==
Winners of the Shelley Memorial Prize:

- 2025 — John Levy
- 2024 — Shin Yu Pai
- 2023 — Evie Shockley
- 2022 — Joyelle McSweeney
- 2021 — Arthur Sze
- 2020 — Rick Barot
- 2019 — Carl R. Martin
- 2018 — Ntozake Shange
- 2017 — Gillian Conoley
- 2016 — Sonia Sanchez
- 2015 — D. A. Powell
- 2014 — Bernadette Mayer
- 2013 — Martín Espada / Lucia Perillo
- 2012 — Wanda Coleman
- 2011 — Rigoberto González / Joan Larkin
- 2010 — Kenneth Irby / Eileen Myles
- 2009 — Ron Padgett / Gary Young
- 2008 — Ed Roberson
- 2007 — Kimiko Hahn
- 2006 — George Stanley
- 2005 — Lyn Hejinian
- 2004 — Yusef Komunyakaa
- 2003 — James McMichael
- 2002 — Angela Jackson / Marie Ponsot
- 2001 — Alice Notley / Michael Palmer
- 2000 — Jean Valentine
- 1999 — Tom Sleigh
- 1998 — Eleanor Ross Taylor
- 1997 — Frank Bidart
- 1996 — Robert Pinsky / Anne Waldman
- 1995 — Stanley Kunitz
- 1994 — Cathy Song / Kenneth Koch
- 1993 — Josephine Jacobsen
- 1992 — Lucille Clifton
- 1991 — Shirley Kaufman
- 1990 — Thom Gunn
- 1989 — Thomas McGrath / Theodore Weiss
- 1988 — Dennis Schmitz
- 1987 — Mona Van Duyn
- 1986 — Gary Snyder
- 1985 — Etheridge Knight
- 1984 — Robert Duncan / Denise Levertov
- 1983 — Jon Anderson / Leo Connellan
- 1982 — Alan Dugan
- 1981 — Robert Creeley
- 1980 — Julia Randall
- 1979 — Hayden Carruth
- 1978 — Jane Cooper / William Everson
- 1977 — Muriel Rukeyser
- 1976 — Gwendolyn Brooks
- 1975 — Edward Field
- 1974 — W. S. Merwin
- 1973 — John Ashbery / Richard Wilbur
- 1972 — Galway Kinnell
- 1971 — Louise Townsend Nicholl / Adrienne Rich
- 1970 — X. J. Kennedy / Mary Oliver
- 1969 — Ann Stanford
- 1968 — May Swenson
- 1967 — Anne Sexton
- 1966 — David Ignatow
- 1965 — Ruth Stone
- 1964 — William Stafford
- 1963 — Eric Barker
- 1962 — Theodore Roethke
- 1961 — Robinson Jeffers
- 1960 — Delmore Schwartz
- 1959 — Jose Garcia Villa
- 1958 — Kenneth Rexroth
- 1957 — George Abbe
- 1956 — Robert Fitzgerald
- 1955 — Léonie Adams
- 1954 — Kenneth Patchen
- 1953 — Elizabeth Bishop
- 1952 — Richard Eberhart
- 1951 — Jeremy Ingalls
- 1950 — Louis Kent
- 1949 — John Berryman
- 1948 — Janet Lewis
- 1947 — Rolfe Humphries
- 1946 — Karl Shapiro
- 1945 — E. E. Cummings
- 1944 — Edgar Lee Masters
- 1943 — Robert Penn Warren
- 1942 — Ridgely Torrence
- 1941 — Marianne Moore
- 1940 — Herbert Bruncken / Winfield T. Scott
- 1939 — Harry Brown / Robert Francis
- 1938 — Lincoln Fitzell
- 1937 — Ben Belitt / Charlotte Wilder
- 1936 — Josephine Miles
- 1935 — Lola Ridge / Marya Zaturenska
- 1934 — Frances Frost / Lola Ridge
- 1932 — Archibald MacLeish
- 1931 — Lizette Woodworth Reese
- 1930 — Conrad Aiken

== See also ==
- American poetry
- List of poetry awards
- List of literary awards
- List of years in poetry
- List of years in literature
