= George Abbe =

American poet

- Born: George Bancroft Abbe; January 28, 1911; Somers, Connecticut, U.S.
- Died: March 15, 1989 (aged 78)
- Education: University of New Hampshire, University of Iowa
- Occupations: Poet, novelist
- Writing career
- Language: English

George Bancroft Abbe (January 28, 1911 – March 15, 1989) was an American poet and novelist.

== Life ==
He was graduated from the University of New Hampshire in 1933 and from the University of Iowa in 1938.

He taught at Mount Holyoke College, Yale University, University of Connecticut, Wayne State University, Columbia University, University of Maine, Springfield College, Central Connecticut State College, Russell Sage College, State University of New York at Plattsburgh.

A novel manuscript is at University of Iowa. He corresponded with Nicholas Joost, Judith Moffett, and Stephen Vincent Benét, and wrote a foreword to his book Stephen Vincent Benét on writing.

In March 1958, he had tea with poets Sylvia Plath, Ted Hughes, and Peter Viereck.

== Awards ==
- 1956/1957 Shelley Memorial Award
- Two grants from State University of New York Research Awards Foundation

== Works ==
=== Poetry ===
- Wait for These Things. H. Holt and Company. 1940.
- Bird in the Mulberry, Collected Lyrics 1938-1952. M. Jones Co. 1954.
- Collected poems, 1932-1961. R. R. Smith. 1961.
- Dreams & Dissent: New Poems, 1961-1970. Noone House. 1970. ISBN 978-0-87233-016-0.

=== Novels ===
- Voices in the Square. New York: Coward-McCann. 1938.
- Dreamer's Clay. New York: Holt, 1940
- Mr. Quill's Crusade. New York: Island Press. 1948.
- The Winter House: New York: Doubleday, 1957
- One More Puritan: Chicago, Windfall, 1963
- The Non-Conformist. Boston: Branden, 1966
- The Funeral: New York: Horizon, 1967
- Yonderville. Boston: Branden, 1969

=== Non-Fiction ===
- The Larks. Bauhan, 1974
- Abbe and Benet, 1976
- The Pigeon Lover. Donning, 1981

=== Editor ===
- Hill Wind, YMCA, 1935
- Stephen Vincent Benet on Writing. Stephen Greene, 1964
- Poetry in the Round: A Poetry Workshop, Smithsonian Folkways, George Abbe, 1961
- You and contemporary poetry; an aid-to-appreciation. North Guilford, Connecticut: An Author-Audience Publication. 1965. ISBN 978-0-87233-010-8.
