= University of Massachusetts Press =

Publisher

- Parent company: University of Massachusetts Amherst
- Founded: 1963
- Country of origin: United States
- Headquarters location: Amherst, Massachusetts
- Distribution: Chicago Distribution Center (US); University of British Columbia Press (Canada); Eurospan (EMEA)
- Publication types: Books
- Official website: www.umasspress.com

The University of Massachusetts Press is a university press that is part of the University of Massachusetts Amherst. The press was founded in 1963, publishing scholarly books and non-fiction. The press imprint is overseen by an interdisciplinary faculty committee. The press is currently a member of the Association of University Presses.

== Juniper Prizes ==
The press also publishes fiction and poetry through its annual Juniper Prizes. The Juniper Prize was named in honor of local poet Robert Francis and his house ('Fort Juniper'). The Juniper Prizes include:

- 2 prizes for poetry: one for a previously published poet, one for a poet not previously published
- 2 prizes for fiction: one for a novel, one for a collection of short stories
- creative non-fiction

The poetry award began in 1975, the fiction award in 2004, and the award for creative non-fiction in 2018.

== Controversies ==
University of Massachusetts Press joined The Association of American Publishers trade organization in the Hachette v. Internet Archive lawsuit which resulted in the removal of access to over 500,000 books from global readers.

== See also ==
- List of English-language book publishing companies
- List of university presses
