= Michael Waters (writer) =

American poet and editor

Michael Waters (born 1949) is an American poet and editor. He currently teaches at Monmouth University. He received his BA and MA at The College at Brockport, State University of New York, MFA at the University of Iowa, and PhD at Ohio University.
