= Decker Press =

Poetry publishing house in Illinois, United States

The Press of James A. Decker was a poetry publishing house once located in the tiny hamlet of Prairie City, Illinois. Created in 1937 by James A. Decker, the press carried the full name of its founder until 1948 when the imprint was shortened to simply the Decker Press. The Decker Press received national attention in the 1940s, when it published work by famous authors such as Edgar Lee Masters, August Derleth, Hubert Creekmore, William Everson (Brother Antoninus), David Ignatow, Kenneth Patchen, Kenneth Rexroth and Louis Zukofsky. The small press was noted as one of the most prolific publishers of poetry in the country at the time, but the business was plagued by financial issues until the press came to a sudden end in 1950 with a murder-suicide case.

== The Decker family ==
James A. Decker, the founder of the Decker Press, was born in 1917 in Prairie City, Illinois, to Ulah and Arthur Decker. His younger sister Dorothy was born in 1921. His father Arthur worked in a drugstore owned by Ulah's father, Eldon James. James Decker graduated from Prairie City High School in 1934 and then attended Park College in Missouri from 1934 to 1935 before returning to Prairie City.

== History of the Press ==
James Decker returned to Prairie City with the goal of combining his passion for poetry and his interest in publishing. Decker obtained a small hand press, which he set up in the back room of his grandfather's drug store. In 1937, he began printing volumes of poetry, with the help of his sister Dorothy. Dorothy continued to work as an employee of the press throughout its operation, including while James served in the military from 1943 to 1945.

The press began gaining attention after James Decker obtained permission to print two of Edgar Lee Masters’ collections: Illinois Poems, published in 1941, and Along the Illinois, published in 1942. The press began to attract other poets from across the country, but Decker struggled with the funding to finance the work. By 1947, the press was facing financial difficulties, and Decker sold it to a local businessman and lumber dealer, Harry M. Denman. A few months later, Denman sold the press to Ervin Tax, a writer from Chicago whose work was scheduled to be published by the Decker Press. Impatient with the delays, Tax traveled to Prairie City to see the press for himself and soon became involved in the financial and administrative oversight. In 1948 Tax purchased the press, changing the name to simply The Decker Press.

Despite Tax's efforts, the financial difficulties of the press continued, and interpersonal relationships began to unravel. As ownership of the press changed hands, James and Dorothy Decker had continued to work as employees, but in 1949 Tax announced that James Decker had been dismissed after mishandling funds. Rather than challenging these accusations of embezzlement, Decker left Prairie City, moving his family to Kansas City. Dorothy remained behind, but her relationship with Tax deteriorated. In May 1950, after driving to pick up Tax who was returning from a trip out of town, Dorothy shot him in the head before killing herself. Their bodies were discovered in the car on the side of the road just outside Prairie City on May 11, 1950.

== Selected authors ==
- Sylvia Trent Auxier: Meadow Rue (1948)
- Tom Boggs, editor: Lyric Moderns in Brief: Some Modern Poets (1940); New Poets: an Anthology of Seven Young Contemporary Poets—Tom Boggs, John Ciardi, Robert Clairmont, M. Gellert, Lucy Kent, E. L. Mayo, Marshall Schacht (1941); An American Anthology: 67 Poems Now in Anthology Form For The First Time (1942)
- Herbert Bruncken: Noise in Time (1949)
- Carlos Bulosan: Letter from America (1942)
- Hubert Creekmore: Personal Sun (1940)
- August Derleth: Rind of Earth (1942); Selected Poems (1944); The Edge of Night (1945)
- William Everson: The Masculine Dead (1942)
- Robert Friend: Shadow on the Sun (1941)
- Martha K. Graham: Prairie City Poems (1940); Listen Forever (1940); Words for the Music (1942)
- David Ignatow: Poems (1948)
- Edgar Lee Masters: Illinois Poems (1941); Along the Illinois (1942)
- Lorine Niedecker: New Goose (1946)
- Kenneth Patchen: To Say If You Love Someone (1947)
- Kenneth Rexroth: The Art of Worldly Wisdom (1949)
- Edouard Roditi: Prison Within Prison (1941)
- Winfield Townley Scott: Wind the Clock (1941)
- Louis Zukofsky: 55 Poems (1941); Anew (1946)

== Legacy ==
The Archives and Special Collections Unit at Western Illinois University Libraries is the single-largest holder of materials from the Press of James A. Decker. Archives staff has compiled a complete bibliography of Decker Press books with a listing of which books are currently held there. Other materials include articles, photographs, correspondence, newspaper clippings, historical records, and unpublished typescripts about the Decker Press and James Decker.
