= Robert Francis (poet) =

American poet (1901–1987)

- Born: August 12, 1901; Upland, Pennsylvania, U.S.
- Died: July 13, 1987 (aged 85); Upland, Pennsylvania, U.S.
- Education: Harvard University
- Occupation: Poet
- Writing career
- Notable awards: Shelley Memorial Award (1939)

Robert Francis (August 12, 1901 – July 13, 1987) was an American poet who lived most of his life in Amherst, Massachusetts.

His 1953 poem "The Pitcher" is considered a classic work by many in the world of athletics. It demonstrates how a physical action does not simply act on the environment but also serves as an interactive communication among all of its elements, including people.

== Life ==
Robert Francis was born on August 12, 1901, in Upland, Pennsylvania. He graduated from Harvard University in 1923 and later attended graduate school there. He settled in Amherst, Massachusetts in 1926 and built a home for himself there in 1940 that he called Fort Juniper, near Cushman Village. At age 40, Francis served four months of military service during World War II and was honorably discharged.

Francis was a lifelong bachelor who lived alone and rejected opportunities for work, instead opting to devote his time to his craft. He lived in poverty, and a friend later said that the $10,000 check that accompanied Francis's 1984 award from the Academy of American Poets was likely to have been more money than Francis had ever earned in a year. Francis never owned a phone and car at the same time, as he could not afford both expenses simultaneously.

== Work ==
Francis's main poetic mentor was Robert Frost, and indeed Francis's first volume of poems, Stand Here with Me (1936), displays a poetic voice reminiscent of Frost's own in carefully crafted nature poems. However, former American poet laureate Richard Wilbur felt that Francis "did not owe a great deal to anybody in the way of influence."

Francis's second book of poetry, Valhalla and Other Poems, won the 1939 Shelley Memorial Award.

Francis published very little during the 1940s and 1950s, because "for better or worse, I was a poet and there was really nothing else for me to do but go on being a poet. It was too late to change even if I had wanted to. Poetry was my most central, intense and inwardly rewarding experience." However, his poems appeared in various poetry anthologies and in journals such as Saturday Review, Transatlantic Review, Virginia Quarterly Review, Yankee, The Lyric, Poetry and The New Yorker.

In 1960, Wesleyan University Press acquired Francis's consent to publish The Orb Weaver, a volume of his poetry dating back to 1945, as well as some new works.

Francis used hidden meanings in his poems, another influence of Frost's style. In later volumes, Francis found a voice distinctively his own, relaxed in meter and characterized by puns, wordplays, slant rhymes and repetitions of key words. Aside from one long narrative poem in Frostian blank verse, Francis's poetry consists largely of concise lyrics, somewhat limited in thematic range but intensely crafted and deeply personal. Francis's poems often contemplated nature and conveyed distinct imagery in representing the essence of the natural world. His poems about baseball continue to find favor with American sports fans.

Francis's autobiography, The Trouble with Francis, was published in 1971 and detailed his struggle with neglect. Frost once claimed that Francis was the best neglected American poet.

Francis died on July 13, 1987 in Upland, Pennsylvania, a week after suffering a fall. At the time of his death, Francis was writing a new book of unpublished poems, a bibliography and some prose pieces.

== Awards ==
Francis won the Shelley Memorial Award in 1939.

In 1957, Francis was awarded the Rome Prize by the American Academy of Arts and Letters, which allowed him to live in Rome for one year with other writers and artists.

In 1984, the Academy of American Poets awarded Francis for distinguished poetic achievement.

== Works ==
=== Poetry ===
- Stand with Me Here. The Macmillan Company. 1936.
- Valhalla and Other Poems. The Macmillan Company. 1938.
- The Face Against the Glass. by the author. 1950.
- The Orb Weaver. Wesleyan University Press. 1960. ISBN 978-0-8195-1005-1.
- Come out into the sun: poems new and selected. University of Massachusetts Press. 1965. ISBN 978-0-87023-015-8. "Robert Francis."
- Like ghosts of eagles: poems, 1966–1974. University of Massachusetts Press. 1974.
- Collected Poems, 1936–1976. NetLibrary, Incorporated. 1985. ISBN 978-0-585-28147-6.
- Late fire, late snow: new and uncollected poems. University of Massachusetts Press. 1992. ISBN 978-0-87023-814-7.
- http://www.poemhunter.com/best-poems/robert-francis/thoreau-in-italy/

=== Autobiography ===
- The Trouble with Francis. University of Massachusetts Press. 1971. ISBN 978-0-87023-083-7.
