= Louise Townsend Nicholl =

American poet

- Born: 1890; Scotch Plains, New Jersey, U.S.
- Died: November 10, 1981 (aged 90–91); Plainfield, New Jersey, U.S.
- Education: Smith College
- Occupation: Poet
- Writing career
- Genre: Poetry

Louise Townsend Nicholl (1890, Scotch Plains, New Jersey – November 10, 1981, Plainfield, New Jersey) was an American poet, and editor.

== Life ==
She graduated from Smith College, where she studied with Adelaide Crapsey.

She worked at The New York Evening Post, Contemporary Verse, Measure (1921–1925), and was an editor at E. P. Dutton.

She was a friend of Louise Bogan, and Gore Vidal. She corresponded with George Dillon.

She was a finalist for a Pulitzer Prize in 1953.

Her work appeared in The New Yorker, Saturday Review, The forum, The Literary Review, The Independent,

She lived in Scotch Plains, New Jersey, and had three sisters, Mrs. Robert Lowery Van Dyke, Marion Nicholl Rawson and Mrs. John Sherburne Valentine.

== Awards ==
- 1954 Academy of American Poets' Fellowship
- 1965 Lowell Mason Palmer Award
- 1971 The Shelley Memorial Award

== Works ==
=== Poetry ===
- Bonner, Amy, ed. (1946). "Refraction". The Poetry Society of America anthology. Ayer Publishing. ISBN 978-0-8369-6003-7.
- The Blossom-print. E.P. Dutton & Company, Inc. 1938.
- Water and Light. E. P. Dutton & company, inc. 1939.
- Dawn in snow. E.P. Dutton. 1941.
- Life is the Flesh: Poems. E.P. Dutton. 1947.
- The Explicit Flower. Dutton. 1952.
- Collected Poems. Dutton. 1953.
- The world's one clock. St. Martin's Press. 1959.
- The blood that is language. John Day Co. 1967.

=== Anthologies ===
- Esther Morgan McCullough, ed. (1956). As I pass, O Manhattan: an anthology of life in New York. Coley Taylor.
- Robert Penn Warren, ed. (1984). Fifty years of American poetry: anniversary volume for the Academy of American Poets. H.N. Abrams.

=== Non-fiction ===
- Louise Townsend Nicholl (June 17, 1916). "Sophia Smith's House in Order". The Saturday Evening Post Magazine.
