= Li-Young Lee =

American poet (born 1957)

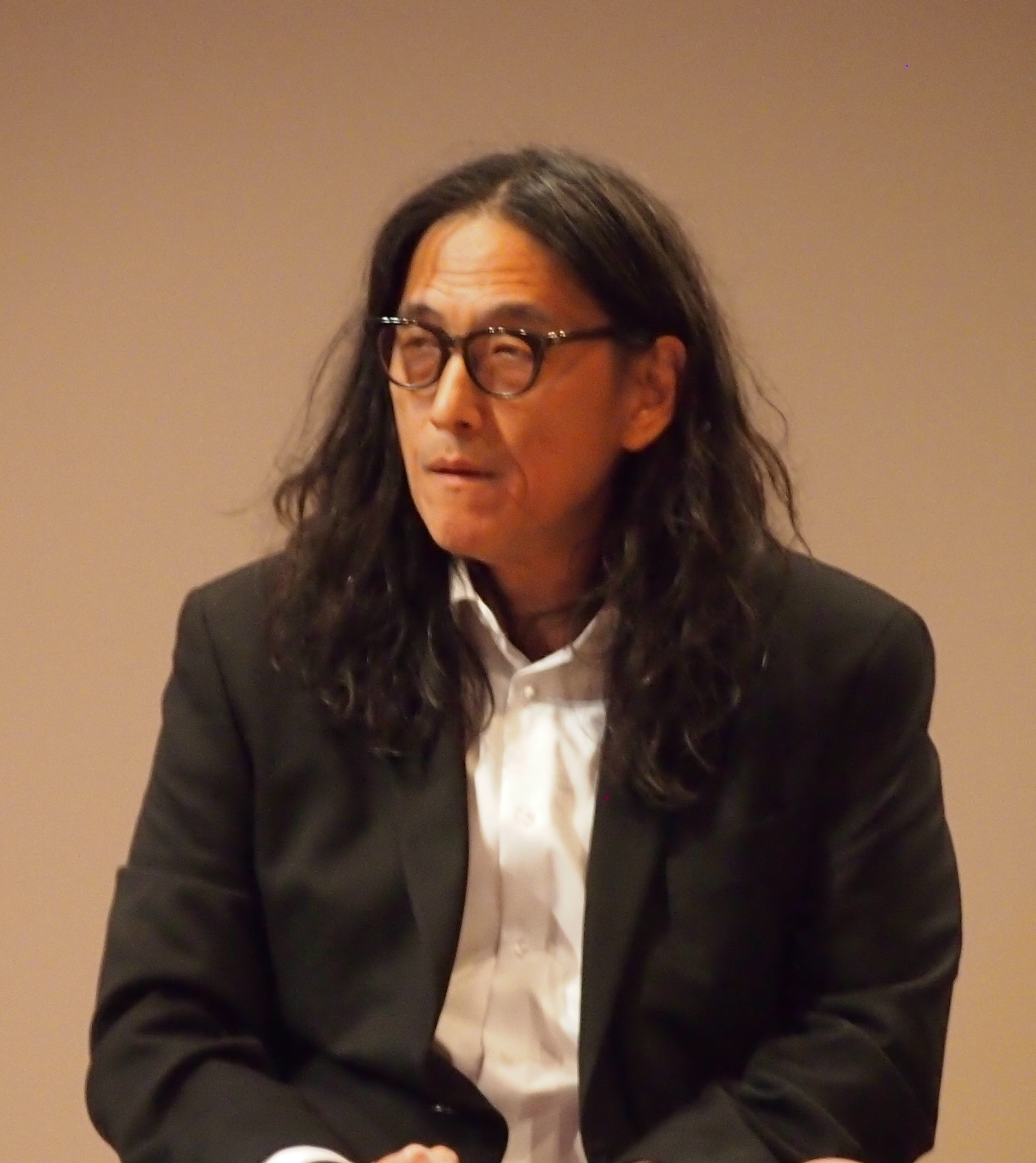
- Li-Young Lee
- Born: August 19, 1957 (age 69); Jakarta, Indonesia
- Occupation: Poet
- Writing career
- Subject: poetry
- Notable work: The City in Which I Love You
- Notable awards: American Book Award; Whiting Award; Lannan Literary Award; Ruth Lilly Poetry Prize

Li-Young Lee (李立揚, pinyin: Lǐ Lìyáng) (born August 19, 1957) is an American poet. He was born in Jakarta, Indonesia, to Chinese parents. His maternal great-grandfather was Yuan Shikai, China's second Republican president, who attempted to make himself emperor. Lee's father, who was a personal physician to Mao Zedong while in China, relocated his family to Indonesia, where he helped found Gamaliel University. In 1959 the Lee family fled Indonesia to escape widespread anti-Chinese sentiment and after a five-year trek through Hong Kong and Japan, they settled in the United States in 1964. Li-Young Lee attended the University of Pittsburgh, the University of Arizona, and the State University of New York Brockport.

== Development as a poet ==
Lee attended the University of Pittsburgh, where he began to develop his love for writing poems. He had seen his father find his passion for ministry and as a result of his father reading to him and encouraging Lee to find his passion, Lee began to dive into the art of language. Lee's writing has also been influenced by classic Chinese poets, such as Li Bai and Du Fu. Many of Lee's poems are filled with themes of simplicity, strength, and silence. All are strongly influenced by his family history, childhood, and individuality. He writes with simplicity and passion which creates images that take the reader deeper and also requires his audience to fill in the gaps with their own imagination. These feelings of exile and boldness to rebel take shape as they provide common themes for poems.

In his poem “Hymns to Childhood”, the memories of days past, the lost innocence of a carefree childhood embroiled in a constant turmoil of fear and danger, has etched into the memory of the poet. Lee in his mind, in his eyes, questions the meaning and purpose of the living present or its certainty? As a child, having witnessed the two-extremity meant out on his father, from a revered privileged doctor to an overnight marked dissenter dragged and locked away, had shaken then a child Lee, from which he never fully recovered. Such experiences of his parents and even his father’s conversion to Christianity as a minister upon the soil of his new homeland America, Lee, could only find spiritual refuge in penning down the meaning of life or its roots in the various poetry as his memory reel before his eyes. His family life experiences, and his varied mindset of its journey are left formulated in deep thoughts in poems such as Self-Help for Refugees, Immigrant Blues and Station. None of these compositions record a sound of new life experiences embraced with an iota of joy or excitement of 'new beginnings', as the original root had already suddenly been pulled and uprooted for him.

== Lee's influence on Asian American poetry ==
Li-Young Lee has been an established Asian American poet who has been doing interviews for the past twenty years. Breaking the Alabaster Jar: Conversations with Li-Young Lee (BOA Editions, 2006, ed. Earl G. Ingersoll), is the first edited and published collection of interviews with an Asian American poet. In this book, Earl G. Ingersoll has collected interviews with the poet consisting of "conversational" questions meant to bring out Lee's views on Asian American poetry, writing, and identity.

== Awards and honors ==
Lee has won numerous poetry awards:

- 1986: Delmore Schwartz Memorial Award, from New York University, for Rose
- 1988: Whiting Award
- 1990: Lamont Poetry Selection for The City in Which I Love You
- 1995: Lannan Literary Award
- 1995: American Book Award, from the Before Columbus Foundation, for The Wingéd Seed: A Remembrance
- 2002: William Carlos Williams Award for Book of My Nights (American Poets Continuum) Judge: Carolyn Kizer
- 2003: Fellowship of the Academy of American Poets, which does not accept applications and which includes a $25,000 stipend
- 2024: Ruth Lilly Poetry Prize, for outstanding lifetime achievement, Poetry Foundation
- Fellowship, National Endowment for the Arts
- Fellowship, John Simon Guggenheim Memorial Foundation
- Grant, Illinois Arts Council
- Grant, Commonwealth of Pennsylvania
- Grant, Pennsylvania Council on the Arts

== Other recognition ==
- 2011: Lee's poem ″A Story″ was featured in the AP English Literature and Composition 2011 Free-Response Questions.

== Selected bibliography ==
=== Poetry ===
- 1986: Rose. Rochester: BOA Editions Limited, ISBN 0-918526-53-1
- 1990: The City In Which I Love You. Rochester: BOA Editions Limited, ISBN 0-918526-83-3
- 2001: Book of My Nights. Rochester: BOA Editions Limited, ISBN 1-929918-08-9
- 2008: Behind My Eyes. New York: W.W. Norton & Co., ISBN 0-393-33481-3
- 2018: The Undressing. New York: W.W. Norton & Co., ISBN 9780393065435
- 2024: The Invention of the Darling: Poems. W.W. Norton & Co., ISBN 9780393867190

=== Memoir ===
- The Winged Seed: A Remembrance. (hardcover) New York: Simon & Schuster, 1995. ASIN: B000NGRB2G (paperback) St. Paul: Ruminator, 1999. ISBN 1-886913-28-5

== See also ==
- List of Asian American writers

== Critical studies ==
as of March 2008:

1. Meaning Maker By: Butts, Lisa; Publishers Weekly, 2007 November 19; 254 (56): 38.
2. Li-Young Lee no hyoka o tooshite By: Kajiwara, Teruko; Eigo Seinen/Rising Generation, 2006 July; 152 (4): pages 212-13.
3. Transcendentalism, Ethnicity, and Food in the Work of Li-Young Lee By: Xu, Wenying; Boundary 2: An International Journal of Literature and Culture, 2006 Summer; 33 (2): pages 129-57.
4. An Exile's Will to Canon and Its Tension with Ethnicity: Li-Young Lee By: Xu, Wenying. IN: Bona and Maini, Multiethnic Literature and Canon Debates. Albany, New York: State University of New York P; 2006. pages 145–64
5. Li-Young Lee By: Davis, Rocío G.. IN: Madsen, Asian American Writers. Detroit, Michigan: Gale; 2005. pages 202–06
6. 'Let the Word Speak through: Jordan C. Wise in Conversation with Li-Young Lee', New Walk, Autumn/Winter 2013; 7: pages 20–23.
7. 'Your Otherness Is Perfect as My Death': The Ethics and Aesthetics of Li-Young Lee's Poetry By: Zhou, Xiaojing. IN: Fahraeus and Jonsson, Textual Ethos Studies or Locating Ethics. New York, New York: Rodopi; 2005. pages 297–314
8. Sexual Desire and Cultural Memory in Three Ethnic Poets By: Basford, Douglas; MELUS: The Journal of the Society for the Study of the Multi-Ethnic Literature of the United States, 2004 Fall-Winter; 29 (3-4): pages 243-56.
9. The Politics of Ethnic Authorship: Li-Young Lee, Emerson, and Whitman at the Banquet Table By: Partridge, Jeffrey F. L.; Studies in the Literary Imagination, 2004 Spring; 37 (1): pages 101-26.
10. Interview with Li-Young Lee By: Bilyak, Dianne; Massachusetts Review: A Quarterly of Literature, the Arts and Public Affairs, 2003-2004 Winter; 44 (4): pages 600-12.
11. Poetries of Transformation: Joy Harjo and Li-Young Lee By: Kolosov, Jacqueline; Studies in American Indian Literatures 2003 Summer; 15 (2): pages 39–57.
12. "Father-Stem and Mother-Root": Genealogy, Memory, and the Poetics of Origins in Theodore Roethke, Elizabeth Bishop, and Li-Young Lee By: Malandra, Marc Joseph; Dissertation, Cornell University, 2002.
13. Forming Personal and Cultural Identities in the Face of Exodus: A Discussion of Li-Young Lee's Poetry By: Jenkins, Tricia; South Asian Review, 2003; 24 (2): pages 199-210.
14. Lee's 'Eating Alone' By: Moeser, Daniel; Explicator, 2002 Winter; 60 (2): pages 117-19.
15. The Way a Calendar Dissolves: A Refugee's Sense of Time in the Work of Li-Young Lee By: Lorenz, Johnny. IN: Davis and Ludwig, Asian American Literature in the International Context: Readings on Fiction, Poetry, and Performance. Hamburg, Germany: Lit; 2002. pages 157–69
16. Night of No Exile By: Jones, Marie C.; Dissertation, University of North Texas, 1999.
17. Art, Spirituality, and the Ethic of Care: Alternative Masculinities in Chinese American Literature By: Cheung, King-Kok. IN: Gardiner, Masculinity Studies and Feminist Theory: New Directions. New York, NY: Columbia UP; 2002. pages 261–89
18. The Precision of Persimmons: Hybridity, Grafting and the Case of Li-Young Lee By: Yao, Steven G.; Lit: Literature Interpretation Theory, 2001 Apr; 12 (1): pages 1–23.
19. To Witness the Invisible: A Talk with Li-Young Lee By: Marshall, Tod; Kenyon Review, 2000 Winter; 22 (1): pages 129-47.
20. Beyond Lot's Wife: The Immigration Poems of Marilyn Chin, Garrett Hongo, Li-Young Lee, and David Mura By: Slowik, Mary; MELUS, 2000 Fall-Winter; 25 (3-4): pages 221-42.
21. Form and Identity in Language Poetry and Asian American Poetry By: Yu, Timothy; Contemporary Literature, 2000 Spring; 41 (3): pages 422-61.
22. An Interview with Li-Young Lee By: Fluharty, Matthew; Missouri Review, 2000; 23 (1): pages 81–99.
23. Li-Young Lee By: Lee, James Kyung-Jin. IN: Cheung, Words Matter: Conversations with Asian American Writers. Honolulu: U of Hawaii P, with UCLA Asian American Studies Center; 2000. pages 270–80
24. Necessary Figures: Metaphor, Irony and Parody in the Poetry of Li-Young Lee, Marilyn Chin, and John Yau By: Wang, Dorothy Joan; Dissertation, University of California, Berkeley, 1998.
25. A Conversation with Li-Young Lee; Indiana Review, 1999 Fall-Winter; 21 (2): 101-08.
26. The Cultural Predicaments of Ethnic Writers: Three Chicago Poets By: Bresnahan, Roger J. Jiang; Midwestern Miscellany, 1999 Fall; 27: pages 36–46.
27. The City in Which I Love You: Li-Young Lee's Excellent Song By: Hesford, Walter A.; Christianity and Literature, 1996 Autumn; 46 (1): pages 37–60.
28. Lee's 'Persimmons' By: Engles, Tim; Explicator, 1996 Spring; 54 (3): pages 191-92.
29. Inheritance and Invention in Li-Young Lee's Poetry By: Zhou, Xiaojing; MELUS, 1996 Spring; 21 (1): pages 113-32.
30. Li-Young Lee By: Hsu, Ruth Y. IN: Conte, American Poets since World War II: Fourth Series. Detroit: Thomson Gale; 1996. pages 139–46
31. Li-Young Lee By: Lee, James; BOMB, 1995 Spring; 51: pages 10–13.
