= BOA Editions, Ltd. =

American literary publisher

Boa Editions
- Founded: 1976
- Founder: A. Poulin, Jr.
- Country of origin: United States
- Headquarters location: Rochester, New York
- Distribution: Consortium Book Sales & Distribution
- Key people: Peter Conners - Executive Director and Publisher Justine Alfano - Director of Production and Marketing Callie Updike - Director of Development and Publicity
- Publication types: Books
- Official website: boaeditions.org

Boa Editions, Ltd. is an American independent, non-profit literary publishing company located in Rochester, New York, founded in 1976 by the late poet, editor and translator, A. Poulin, Jr., and publishing poetry, fiction, and nonfiction.

The press's mission statement: "Boa Editions, Ltd., a not-for-profit publisher of poetry and other literary works, fosters readership and appreciation of contemporary literature. By identifying, cultivating, and publishing both new and established poets and selecting authors of unique literary talent, Boa brings high quality literature to the public."

Notable authors include Li-Young Lee, Lucille Clifton, W.D. Snodgrass, Naomi Shihab Nye, Brigit Pegeen Kelly, G.C. Waldrep, Katy Lederer, Carolyn Kizer, Russell Edson, Karen Volkman, Sean Thomas Dougherty, Kazim Ali, Deena Linett, Michael Waters (writer), and Wyn Cooper. Authors have been recipients of the Pulitzer Prize, the National Book Award, Ruth Lilly Poetry Prize, Lannan Literary Awards, the Shelley Memorial Award, Guggenheim Fellowships, NEA fellowships, and many other awards and honors. Boa Editions titles have been reviewed in The New York Times, Publishers Weekly, Library Journal, and other venues.

According to the University of Rochester, “Boa itself won the 2001 New York State Governor's Arts Award for overall artistic excellence, the only New York State not-for-profit literary publisher in 38 years ever to receive such an honor. The University of Rochester’s Rare Books and Special Collections Library owns the Boa archives from 1996 to 2005, and Yale University's Beinecke Library, the first collection of Boa archives, from 1976 to 1995. The press was featured in Publishers Weekly on the occasion of their 35th anniversary, featured by the Poetry Society of America on their 40th anniversary, and one of their titles, Not for Specialists: New and Selected Poems, by W. D. Snodgrass, landed on The New York Times Bestseller list

The press has received grants from Literature Program of the New York State Council on the Arts; the Literature Program of the National Endowment for the Arts; the Sonia Raiziss Giop Charitable Foundation; the Lannan Foundation; the Mary S. Mulligan Charitable Trust; the County of Monroe, NY; the Rochester Area Community Foundation; the Ames-Amzalak Memorial Trust in memory of Henry Ames, Semon Amzalak and Dan Amzalak; and the Steeple-Jack Fund.

Awards given by Boa Editions include the A. Poulin, Jr. Prize, for a poet's first collection of poetry and the Isabella Gardner Poetry Award.

== Sources ==
- Boa Editions, Ltd. > About Boa
- Academy of American Poets > National Poetry Month Sponsors > Boa Editions
