= Kundiman (nonprofit organization) =

Nonprofit organization helping writers and readers of Asian American literature

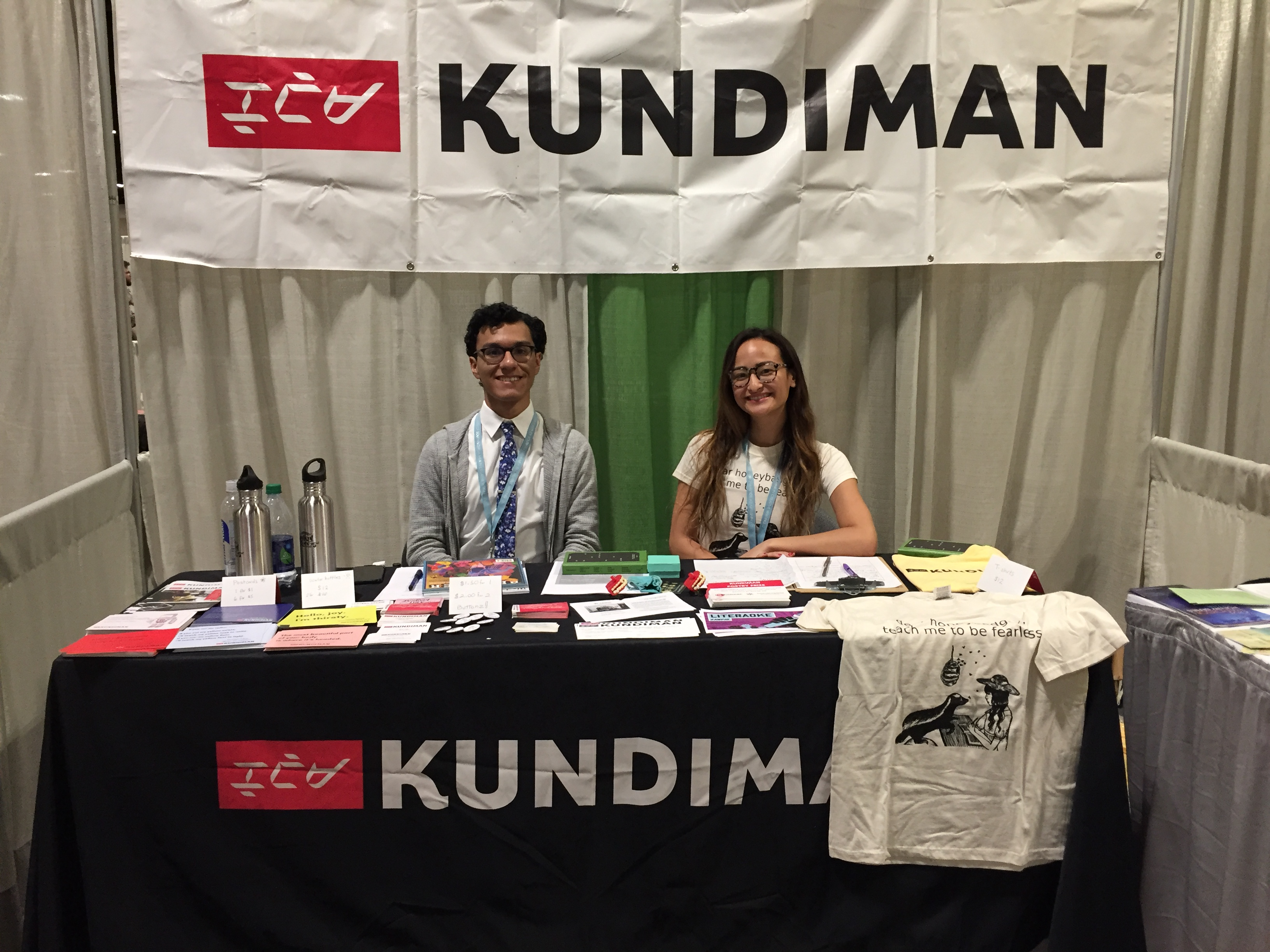
Kundiman Booth at AWP 2018

Kundiman is a nonprofit organization dedicated to writers and readers of Asian American literature. Among its services are readings, workshops, mentorship programs, writing intensives, as well as a poetry prize and an annual writing retreat, the Kundiman Retreat.

== History ==
Kundiman was co-founded in 2004 by poets Sarah Gambito and Joseph O. Legaspi after discussing the need for literary community among Asian Americans while at Gambito's family barbecue. The organization’s name refers to a style of Filipino love song, kundiman, that served as veiled patriotism during colonial times.

In 2009, Kundiman announced a collaboration with Alice James Books for a $2,000 book publication prize for Asian American poets, marking the first book prize ever of its kind.

In 2018, Kundiman Fellow Kyle Lucia Wu hosted a Wikipedia edit-a-thon in partnership with Wikimedia NYC and the Asian American Writers' Workshop to create, revise, and update pages pertaining to Asian American literature. New pages resulting from the event included Alice Sola Kim, Weike Wang, and R. F. Kuang.

In October of 2023, Kundiman posted and subsequently deleted a social media post declaring solidarity with Palestinians, after which it was replaced with a more neutral position. For months afterward, members of the Kundiman network would meet and discuss internally about the aforementioned events. In May of the following year, over a hundred Kundiman Fellows, including Ocean Vuong and Solmaz Sharif, signed and published an open letter to the Kundiman board calling for their resignation due to the organization's conflicted posture and their failure to meet certain demands. Two days later, Kundiman responded, stating that, as an organization, they could not take "specific advocacy positions".

In September of 2024, Kundiman announced that Kazim Ali and David Mura would join the organization's board of trustees. One month later, they announced that Andy Chen, Ching-In Chen, Rana Tahir, Seema Yasmin, and Timothy Yu would join Ali and Mura.

After the Asian American Literature Festival's cancellation in 2023, Kundiman and several other Asian American literary and arts organizations launched a series of in-person, hybrid, and online programming across the United States and beyond taking place near the end of 2024.

Past programming and event partners with Kundiman have been the Cave Canem Foundation, Kearny Street Workshop, Smithsonian Asian Pacific American Center, Vermont Studio Center, Kaya Press, Fine Arts Work Center, New York University, and more.

== Kundiman Retreat ==
The inaugural Retreat was hosted at the University of Virginia in 2004. Later, in 2010, Kundiman and Fordham University formed a partnership in which the Kundiman Retreat would be hosted on the Rose Hill campus, while Kundiman-sponsored readings and events would happen at the Lincoln Center campus. Additionally, Fordham would provide Kundiman with $60,000 for programming support over the course of three years. In 2015, the retreat was opened up to fiction writers as well as poets.

Altogether, Kundiman Fellows have published 311 books and counting, as well as pieces in literary magazines like The New Yorker, Colorado Review, The Atlantic, Poetry, The New York Times, and more.

Past Kundiman Fellows include:

- Aria Aber
- George Abraham
- Jessica Abughattas
- Vidhu Aggarwal
- Neil Aitken
- Fatimah Asghar
- Rowan Hisayo Buchanan
- Ina Cariño
- K-Ming Chang
- Bonnie Chau
- Cathy Linh Che
- Chen Chen
- Ching-In Chen
- Franny Choi
- Tarfia Faizullah
- Pik-Shuen Fung
- Meng Jin
- Janine Joseph
- Sarah Kay
- Swati Khurana
- E.J. Koh
- Jee Leong Koh
- Muriel Leung
- Lillian Li
- Sally Wen Mao
- Rajiv Mohabir
- Diana Khoi Nguyen
- Hieu Minh Nguyen
- Tiana Nobile
- Matthew Olzmann
- Monica Ong
- Margaret Rhee
- Purvi Shah
- Sadia Shepard
- Terisa Siagatonu
- Anthony Veasna So
- Monica Sok
- Lucy Tan
- Paul Tran
- Mai Der Vang
- R. A. Villanueva
- Ocean Vuong
- Jackie Wang
- Jane Wong
- Jenny Xie
- Seema Yasmin
- Jenny Tinghui Zhang

Past and present Kundiman faculty includes:

- Kazim Ali
- Ryka Aoki
- Gina Apostol
- Rick Barot
- Jaswinder Bolina
- Regie Cabico
- Lan Samantha Chang
- Marilyn Chin
- Staceyann Chin
- Don Mee Choi
- Bei Dao
- Peter Ho Davies
- Eugene Gloria
- Kimiko Hahn
- Lawson Inada
- Porochista Khakpour
- Myung Mi Kim
- lê thị diễm thúy
- Karen An-hwei Lee
- Li-Young Lee
- Sandra Lim
- Tan Lin
- R. Zamora Linmark
- Megha Majumdar
- David Mura
- Sabina Murray
- Aimee Nezhukumatathil
- Bich Minh Nguyen
- Sigrid Nunez
- Michelle Naka Pierce
- Bao Phi
- Jon Pineda
- Srikanth Reddy
- Paisley Rekdal
- Lee Ann Roripaugh
- Patrick Rosal
- Matthew Salesses
- Solmaz Sharif
- Prageeta Sharma
- Sun Yung Shin
- Arthur Sze
- Lehua Taitano
- Lysley Tenorio
- Truong Tran
- Karen Tei Yamashita
- Monica Youn
- C. Dale Young

== See also ==
- CantoMundo
- Cave Canem Foundation
- Furious Flower Poetry Center
- Voices of Our Nation Arts Foundation (VONA)
