= Ballast (book) =

2023 poetry collection by Quenton Baker

ballast
- Cover of the first edition
- Author: Quenton Baker
- Language: English
- Genre: Poetry
- Publisher: Haymarket Books
- Publication date: April 2023
- Publication place: United States
- Media type: Print (paperback and hardcover), ebook
- Pages: 150
- ISBN: 978-1-64259-902-2

Ballast (stylized in all lowercase) is a 2023 poetry collection by Quenton Baker, published by Haymarket. The collection draws on the 1841 revolt aboard the slave ship Creole and on archival records associated with that event.

== Background and publication ==
Before the book's publication, Baker presented an exhibition titled Ballast at the Frye Art Museum in Seattle in 2018. City Arts described the exhibition as a "physical spin-off" of a still-in-progress poetry book of the same name. Haymarket Books published the finished book in April 2023.

== Reception ==
In the Los Angeles Review of Books, Jon Jon Moore Palacios called ballast "a time-collapsing erasure and long poem" and wrote that "Baker's erasure reveals speech beneath the sedimented ledger". Reviewing the book for the Poetry Foundation, Cindy Juyoung Ok wrote that, over more than 90 pages, its surviving words "express life despite violent erasure" and described the book's three parts as testimony to Baker's "deliberate style".
