= Root Fractures =

2024 poetry collection by Diana Khoi Nguyen

Root Fractures: Poems
- Author: Diana Khoi Nguyen
- Publisher: Scribner
- Publication date: January 30, 2024
- Pages: 128
- ISBN: 978-1668031308
- Preceded by: Ghost Of

Root Fractures: Poems is a 2024 poetry collection by Diana Khoi Nguyen, published by Scribner. Nguyen's second poetry collection, it was one of Time's 100 must-reads for 2024.

== Contents and background ==
The book's poems concern a Vietnamese American family following the events of the Vietnam War. Nguyen stated she had written the book's poems between 2017 and 2021 "over various intensive writing sessions, roughly thirty days each year". After 2021, Nguyen felt like she had "enough poems" for a book but left them unordered for another year. It was after the birth of her child in 2022 that she put the book together. She also created "video work" through home videos, documentaries, and "video-poems" that helped her think through the structure of the book.

Nguyen's book's release coincided with the release of Cindy Juyoung Ok's debut poetry collection, Ward Toward. Noting the similarities between their poetic projects, Nguyen and Ok embarked on a "joint book tour" in 2024. In the Cincinnati Review, Ok stated "we both had publication dates of early 2024 and imagined sharing these books together, letting them bring us, rootward, to our favorite friends, cities, and bookstores."

== Title ==
Nguyen decided on the title of the book not knowing that a root fracture was a dental term; in dentistry, a root fracture refers to a break in a tooth that reaches its root. She stated that if she could go back in time, she would "remind myself to look up 'root fractures' in a search engine and spend time with all those X-rays of damaged teeth!"

== Critical reception ==
The book was listed in Time's 100 must-reads for 2024 and The Millions' must-read poetry for winter of 2024. Time called the book "a collection of poetic courage" and stated it was a continuation of Nguyen's exploration of grief from her debut.

Library Journal said "At turns heartbreaking and breathtaking, this collection of poems and images stuns. Listeners will be eager for more from this talented poet." In a starred review, BookPage lauded the book's relationship between memory, history, and trauma, stating "These are poems worth returning to; each reading brings discoveries of new pathways of tension and connection." Preposition commended the book for how it traced "through the fractures and fractals of history".
