= Ward Toward =

2024 poetry collection by Cindy Juyoung Ok

- Author: Cindy Juyoung Ok
- Publisher: Yale University Press
- Publication date: March 5, 2024
- Pages: 100
- Awards: Yale Younger Poets Prize
- ISBN: 978-0300273922

Ward Toward is a 2024 poetry collection by Cindy Juyoung Ok, published by Yale University Press. It was selected for the Yale Series of Younger Poets in 2023 by Rae Armantrout.

== Contents and background ==
The book's poems concern Ok's identity as a Korean American woman as well as her and her family's relationship to the events and legacy of the Korean War. It also tackles more recent incidents like the 2021 Atlanta spa shootings.

Ok's manuscript was selected for the 118th Yale Younger Poets Prize by Armantrout. In her foreword to the book, Armantrout wrote:

"This book is radically honest and unpretentious. Cindy Juyoung Ok never claims to know best. Her inquisitive, skeptical mind challenges beliefs, including any she herself might hold ... Ok's resistance to being categorized or labeled, evident throughout the book, may have begun in her experience as an Asian American or in her dealings with the medical establishment, but has become a poetics."

The release of Ward Toward coincided with the release of Root Fractures by Diana Khoi Nguyen. Feeling similarity between their poetic projects in addition to publication dates, Ok and Nguyen agreed to embark on a "joint book tour" in 2024. In a joint interview for the Cincinnati Review, Ok stated "we both had publication dates of early 2024 and imagined sharing these books together, letting them bring us, rootward, to our favorite friends, cities, and bookstores."

== Critical reception ==
In a starred review, Publishers Weekly called the book a "refreshing" and "brave and idiosyncratic debut" that tackled the history and circumstances of the Korean War.

Critics observed the book's relationship to identity and history. The Poetry Foundation lauded Ok's experiments in language as a means to tackle the "isolation and dislocation" of Korean American heritage. RHINO argued that Ok's poems presented language as both "a ward that shapes a world ... a tool of brainwashing" as well as "a site for play ... not just a vehicle for meaning, but a visual and sonic playground." The Los Angeles Review of Books argued that Ok's poems had the effect of reclaiming representation of Korean American women, stating "Ok transforms society’s reduction of her identity into a skillful and imaginative poetics that embodies her corporeal self." On the Seawall said the book "impresses with its depth of feeling, range of meaning, and verbal dexterity" on its litany of topics including the Korean War, Korean American identity, and various articulations of wards. The Harvard Crimson wrote that "Questions of identity, mental health, relationships, and race collide as Cindy Juyoung Ok pushes her poetry to its full potential".

The book was recommended in poetry collection lists by Electric Literature and LitHub.
