= Nimri =

Nimri is a surname. Notable people with the surname include:

- Barbara Nimri Aziz (born 1940), anthropologist, journalist, and writer
- Najwa Nimri (born 1972), Spanish actress and singer of Jordanian descent
- Tawfiq Al-Nimri (1918–2011), Jordanian singer and composer
