= Xo Orpheus =

2013 anthology edited by Kate Bernheimer

xo Orpheus: Fifty New Myths
- Editor: Kate Bernheimer
- Author: Various
- Genre: Postmodern literature
- Published: 24 Sep 2013
- Publisher: Penguin Books
- Preceded by: My Mother She Killed Me, My Father He Ate Me: Forty New Fairy Tales

xo Orpheus: Fifty New Myths is a 2013 anthology edited by Kate Bernheimer. It is a collection of stories based on older myths and fairy tales, billed as a "new way of mythmaking." The book was nominated for the 2014 World Fantasy Award for Best Anthology.

== Contents ==
Title	Author	Original Myth
Anthropogenesis Or: How to Make a Family	Laura van den Berg	Norse Creation myth
Argos	Joy Williams	Argos
The Sisters	Sabina Murray	Bacchantes
Sawdust	Edward Carey	Baucis and Philemon
Friend Robin	Maile Chapman	Brownies
The Veiled Prophet	David B.	The Caliph of One Thousand and One Nights
Henry and Booboo	Elanor Dymott	Candaules and Gyges
Modern Coyote	Shane Jones	Coyote myths
Devourings	Aimee Bender	Cronos
Labyrinth	Ron Currie Jr.	Daedalus
The Last Flight of Daedalus	Anthony Marra	Daedalus
Daphne	Dawn Raffel	Daphne
Demeter	Maile Meloy	Demeter
Kid Collins	Willy Vlautin	Demeter and Persephone
Sleeping Beauty	Gina Ochsner	Eris
Galatea	Madeline Miller	Galatea and Pygmalion
The Hand	Manuel Muñoz	God and Satan
The Dummy	Benjamin Percy	Golem and Pygmalion
The Girl with the Talking Shadow	Kate Bernheimer	Hades
Wait and See	Edith Pearlman	Human Pentachromats
An Occasional Icarus	Georges-Olivier Châteaureynaud	Icarus
Killcrop	Victor LaValle	Killcrop
The Squid Who Fell in Love with the Sun	Ben Loory	Kraken
Birdsong from the Radio	Elizabeth McCracken	Lamia
The Lotus Eaters	Aurelie Sheehan	Lotus-eaters
Slaves	Elizabeth Evans	Maenads and Sinbad the Sailor
Drona's Death	Max Gladstone	Mahabharata
So Many-Headed Gates	Sheila Heti	Monsters
The Status of Myth	Kelly Braffet and Owen King	Edith Wharton's Mythology
Narcissus	Zachary Mason	Narcissus
Back to Blandon	Michael Jeffrey Lee	Odysseus
The Story I Am Speaking to You Now	Davis Schneiderman	Odysseus
The Brigadier-General Takes His Final Stand, by James Butt	Imad Rahman	Oedipus
Dark Resort	Heidi Julavits	Orpheus and Eurydice
Mystery Spot: 95065	Karen Tei Yamashita	Paradise
Lost Lake	Emma Straub and Peter Straub	Persephone
What Wants My Son	Kevin Wilson	Phaeton
Thousand	Laird Hunt	Poseidon
Belle-Medusa	Manuela Draeger	Post-apocalypse
The Swan's Wife	Aamer Hussein	Raja Rasalu
Sanna	Kathryn Davis	Sedna
Madame Liang	Lutz Bassmann	Sirin
Sissy	Kit Reed	Sisyphus
In a Structure Simulating an Owl	Ander Monson	Strix
Cat's Eye	Donají Olmedo	Tezcatlipoca
Betrayal	Sigrid Nunez	Transformation
A Horse, a Vine	Johanna Skibsrud	Trojan Horse
The Hungers of an Old Language	Brian Aldiss	The Unconscious
The White Horse	Sarah Blackman	Zeus and Europa

== Reception ==
Publishers Weekly called the book an "ingenious new anthology of boundless imagination". The review concluded that these "enthralling contemporary myths are bold stories of love, loss, friendship, disaster and everything in between."

A review in Time Out praised Bernheimer's wide selection of stories, writing that the collection "[ranges] from archaic and straightforward to contemporary and experimental—without repeating tone or genre."

The book was nominated for the 2014 World Fantasy Award for Best Anthology.
