= Fahmida Azim =

Bangladeshi-American illustrator

Fahmida Azim ফাহমিদা আজীম
- Born: 1994 (age 31–32) Bangladesh
- Area: Artist
- Awards: Pulitzer Prize for Illustrated Reporting and Commentary, 2022; Golden Kite Award, 2022

Fahmida Azim (Bengali: ফাহমিদা আজীম; born 1994) is a Bangladeshi-American illustrator and author. Fahmida won the Pulitzer Prize in 2022 for her portrayal of an escape from a Xinjiang re-education camp.

== Early life and education ==
Azim was born in 1994 to a Bengali Muslim family in Bangladesh, and moved to the United States with her parents when she was a child. She was raised in Virginia, and graduated from VCU School of the Arts.

== Recognition ==
Azim and Seema Yasmin's book Muslim Women Are Everything was awarded the 2021 International Book Award for Multicultural Non-Fiction.

Azim was a co-winner of the first Pulitzer Prize for Illustrated Reporting and Commentary, for her illustrations of the 2021 comics journalism work "How I Escaped a Chinese Internment Camp". She also won the 2022 Golden Kite Award for Best Illustrated Book for Older Readers, for her illustrations in Samira Surfs by Rukhsanna Guidroz.

== Personal life ==
As of 2022, Azim lives in Seattle. She is bisexual.

== Bibliography ==
- (with Seema Yasmin) Muslim Women Are Everything: Stereotype-Shattering Stories of Courage, Inspiration, and Adventure (Harper Design, 2020) ISBN 978-0062947031
- (with Rukhsanna Guidroz) Samira Surfs (Kokila 2021) ISBN 978-1984816191
- (with Anthony Del Col and Josh Adams) I Escaped a Chinese Internment Camp (New Friday, Sept. 2023) ISBN 9781988247960
