= Taitano =

Taitano is a surname. Notable people with the surname include:

- Leevin Taitano Camacho (born 1977/78), Guam lawyer
- Lehua Taitano (born 1978), Chamoru poet, interdisciplinary artist, and educator
- Noah Taitano (born 1997), American YouTuber of Loveliveserve
- Ricardo Taitano (born 1957), Guam long-distance runner
