= University of Arkansas Press =

Publishing house of the University of Arkansas

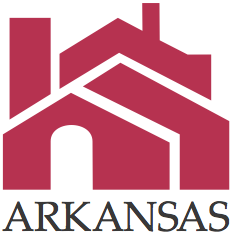
- Parent company: University of Arkansas
- Founded: 1980
- Country of origin: United States
- Headquarters location: Fayetteville, Arkansas
- Distribution: Chicago Distribution Center; Scholarly Book Services (Canada)
- Publication types: Books, academic journals
- Official website: www.uapress.com

The University of Arkansas Press is a university press that is part of the University of Arkansas and has been a member of the Association of University Presses since 1984. Its mission is to publish peer-reviewed books and academic journals. It was established in 1980 by Willard B. Gatewood Jr. and Miller Williams and is housed in the McIlroy House in Fayetteville. Notable authors include civil-rights activist Daisy Bates, US president Jimmy Carter, former US poet laureate Billy Collins, and National Book Award–winner Ellen Gilchrist.

== History ==
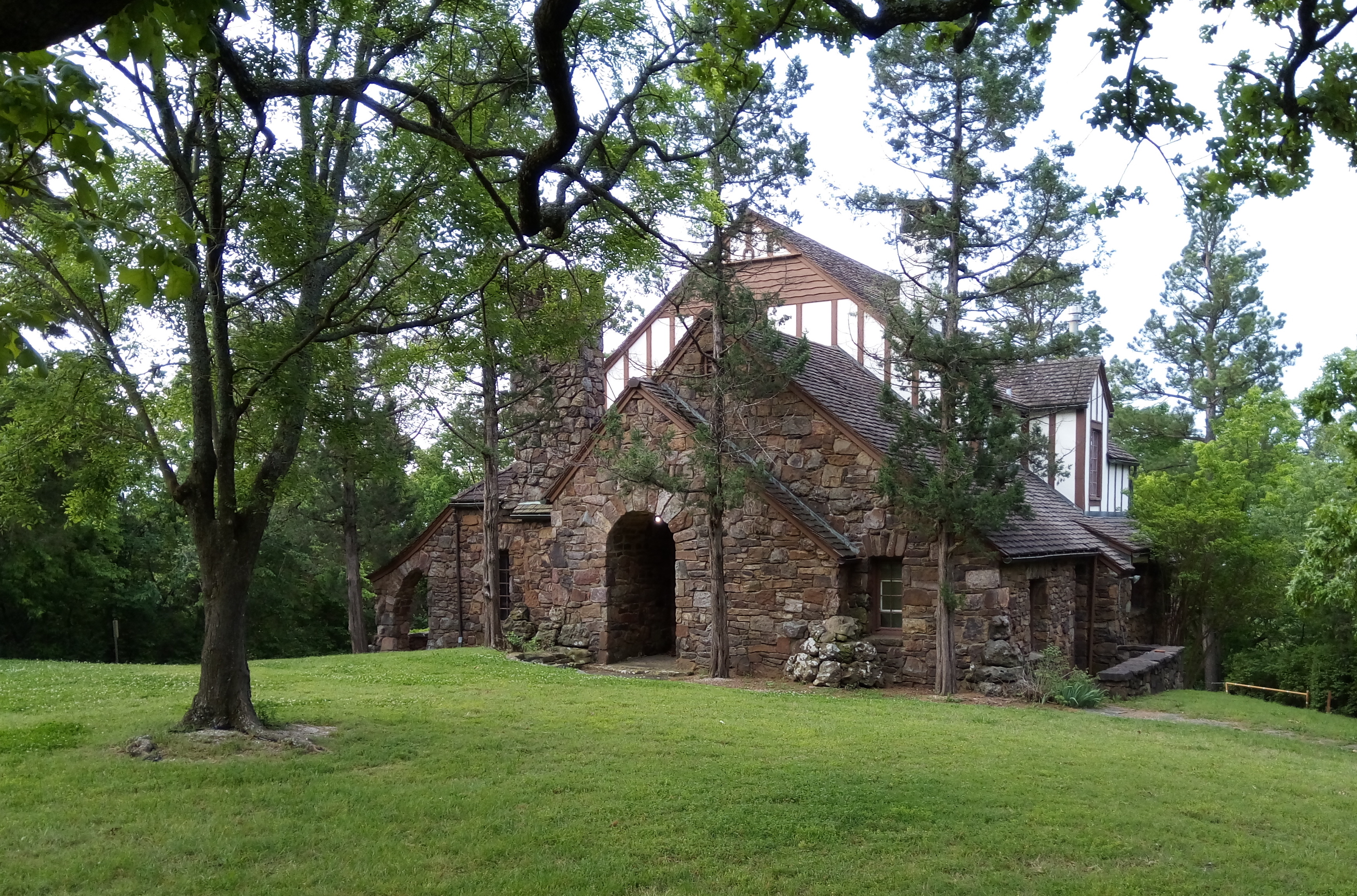
The McIlroy House at the University of Arkansas in Fayetteville.

The University of Arkansas Press was established in May 1980 as the publishing arm of the University of Arkansas by the board of trustees of the university. Miller Williams was named the first director of the press, and Willard B. Gatewood Jr. was named the chairman of the first press committee. For the first five years of operation, assistance from the University of Missouri Press was crucial to editorial and production operations.

In December 1980 the McIlroy House was formally opened as its home, and in the following year the press published its first three books. Martha Sutherland of the university's School of Architecture designed a stylized version of the McIlroy House that was chosen for the colophon, which appears on the spine of all the publisher's volumes.

In November 1983 a fire severely damaged the McIlroy House. In September 1987, another fire damaged the press's warehouse and destroyed much of its book inventory.

In 1997 University of Arkansas chancellor John A. White closed the press, but it was reopened within months after intense public outcry. In 1998 the press received an endowment from Tyson Foods and the university hired Lawrence Malley as the director. Malley expanded the press's coverage of sports studies, African-American studies, and Middle East studies during his tenure.

In 2013 Mike Bieker was named director. The press continues to publish about twenty-five titles per year, covering poetry and literature, African American studies, food studies, sports studies, and art and architecture.

== Poetry ==
Miller Williams's initial leadership of the press lead to an early specialization in literature. As both a professor and editor, Williams nurtured hundreds of young poets, most notably former US poet laureate Billy Collins, who cites Williams as a mentor and his "first editorial father." The press published Collins's The Apple That Astonished Paris in 1988.

Enid Shomer was named poetry editor in 2002 and directed the Arkansas Poetry Prize (later named the Miller Williams Poetry Prize). In 2014 Billy Collins returned to the press to serve as editor of the poetry series and as judge for the Miller Williams Poetry Prize, which annually awards publication to two finalists and a cash prize of $5,000 to one winner.

In 2015 the press partnered with CantoMundo to establish the CantoMundo Poetry Prize, which annually awards publication and a cash prize to a Latino poet writing in English. Judged and edited by Deborah Paredez and Carmen Giménez Smith, the series has brought out collections from Jacob Shores-Argüello, Ángel García, Gina Franco, and Sara Lupita Olivares.

In the same year the press also partnered with RAWI to establish the Etel Adnan Poetry Prize (named in honor of Lebanese American poet, essayist, and visual artist Etel Adnan, which annual awards publication and a cash prize to a poet of Arab heritage writing in English. Judged and edited by Hayan Charara and Fady Joudah, the series has brought out collections from Jess Rizkallah, Peter Twal, Zaina Alsous, and Jessica Abughattas.

== See also ==
- List of English-language book publishing companies
- List of university presses
