= Natalie Eilbert =

American poet, essayist, journalist, and science writer

- Born: New York
- Citizenship: United States
- Education: Columbia University MFA, Northwestern University MS
- Occupations: Poet, Journalist
- Writing career
- Language: English
- Genre: Poetry
- Notable work: Overland (2023)
- Notable awards: 2021 NEA Poetry Fellow, Noemi Press's 2016 Poetry Prize
- Website: www.natalie-eilbert.com

Natalie Eilbert is a poet, essayist, journalist, and science writer. She has authored several poetry collections, including Overland (Copper Canyon Press, 2023), and received the 2016–17 Jay C. and Ruth Halls Poetry Fellowship at the University of Wisconsin.

Eilbert founded The Atlas Review, and has taught at the University of Wisconsin–Madison and elsewhere. She has served as the mental health reporter for the Milwaukee Journal Sentinel, and in 2026 was appointed as the opinion editor for the Cap Times.

== Life and education ==
Eilbert was born on Long Island, New York and has lived in Brooklyn, Chicago, where she interned at the Better Government Association, and Madison.

She has an MFA from Columbia University's School of the Arts, and an MS in journalism from Northwestern's Medill School of Journalism, specializing in health, environment, and science reporting.

== Career ==
Eilbert is the author of two poetry chapbooks and three full-length collections. Her poetry has appeared in The Paris Review, Granta, The New Yorker, The Kenyon Review, and elsewhere.

In 2014, several of Eilbert's poems were named runners up in the first annual Better Prize in Poetry. She won Noemi Press's 2016 Poetry Prize for her collection Indictus, published with the press in 2018. In 2021, she was selected by Shane McCrae as the winner of the Poetry Society's George Bogin Memorial Award. She was also the recipient of the 2016–17 Jay C. and Ruth Halls Poetry Fellowship at the University of Wisconsin, and has taught at the University of Wisconsin–Madison, SUNY Purchase, the 92nd Street Y, Catapult, and the Brooklyn Poets.

Eilbert has reported for the Green Bay Press-Gazette, the Milwaukee Journal Sentinel, and was recently appointed as the opinion editor for the Cap Times. While working as a local government watchdog reporter with the Gazette, Eilbert won first prize in investigative reporting from the Wisconsin Newspaper Association.

=== Reception ===
Eilbert published her debut full-length collection Swan Feast with Bloof Books in 2015. It was earlier reported to be published by Coconut Books. Writing for The Rumpus, Julie Marie Wade called it "a deeply fraught and deeply feminist" volume. Poems in Swan Feast have generally been praised for being "adept at eroticizing the rangiest terrain."

Eilbert's Noemi Press Prize-winning second collection Indictus, published in 2018, was "largely about, or responding to" sexual violence. Jacqueline Krass, writing for The Adroit Journal, praised Eilbert's words for being "obsessed with thingness" – "unsteady, sexual and sexualized, violated and capable of doing violence themselves." The poet Cortney Lamar Charleston called it a "relentless collection" and praised it for "deftly transforming language", and the Chicago Review of Books called it a "tour de force". However, in another review of Indictus, Sarah V. Schweig questioned Eilbert for "preemptively closing off the audience" and a "narrowness" of thought.

Overland, Eilbert's third collection, was published by Copper Canyon Press in 2023. Writing for Book Riot, Connie Pan praised the "tender poems" in the collection for their examination of "grief and memory, disasters and light, and nature and science." Christopher Spaide, writing for the Poetry Foundation, called Eilbert a "poet of long, lunging lines", and praised Overland for its approach to "[l]anguage as gift".

== Books ==
=== Full-length collections ===
- Overland (Copper Canyon Press, 2023) ISBN 9781556596681
- Indictus (Noemi Press, 2018) ISBN 9781934819715
- Swan Feast (Bloof Books, 2015) ISBN 9780982658796

=== Chapbooks ===
- And I Shall Again Be Virtuous (Big Lucks Books, 2014)
- Conversation with the Stone Wife (Bloof Books, 2014)

== Awards ==
- 2016: Noemi Press Poetry Prize, for Indictus
- 2016–17: Jay C. and Ruth Halls Poetry Fellowship, at the University of Wisconsin–Madison's Wisconsin Institute of Creative Writing
- 2021: George Bogin Memorial Award
- 2021: Poetry Fellow, National Endowment for the Arts
- 2024: NAMI Wisconsin's Iris Award
