= Jane Wong =

American poet and professor

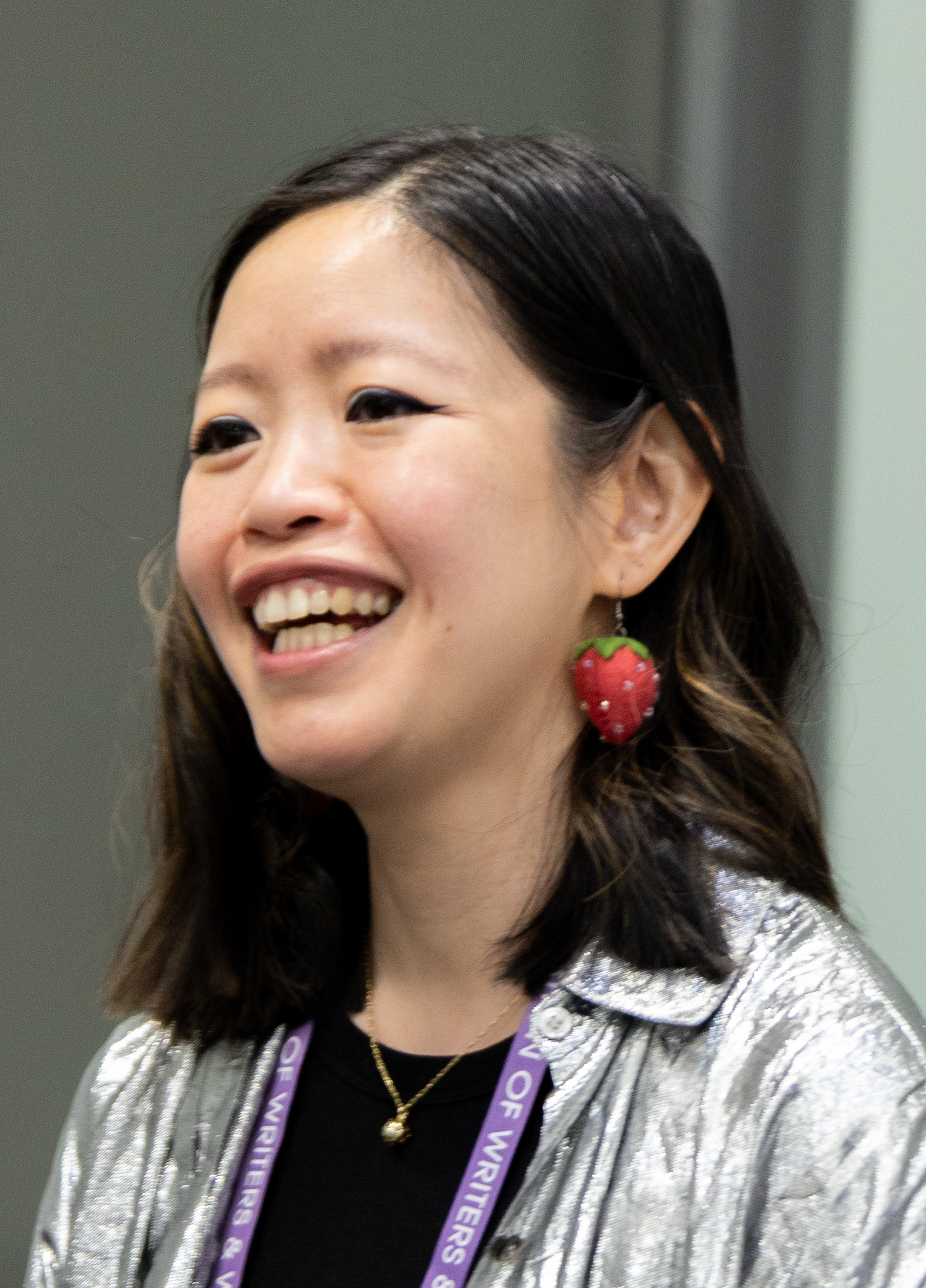
- Wong at AWP 2025
- Education: University of Washington, Bard College, University of Iowa
- Occupations: Poet, memoirist, professor
- Website: janewongwriter.com

Jane Wong is an American poet and professor at Western Washington University. She is the author of the full-length poetry collections Overpour and How Not to Be Afraid of Everything, and she has been published in Best American Poetry 2015 and Best New Poets 2012. Wong grew up in Tinton Falls, New Jersey, where her parents owned a Chinese restaurant and where Jane remembers much of her childhood. In 2023, she released her memoir Meet Me Tonight in Atlantic City. She currently resides in Seattle, Washington.

== Background ==
Wong received her B.A. in English from Bard College, her MFA in Poetry from the Iowa Writers' Workshop, and her Ph.D. in English from the University of Washington.

== Awards and honors ==
- 2022 Longlisted for the PEN/Voelcker Award
- 2016 Stanley Kunitz Memorial Prize from The American Poetry Review
- 2015 Best American Poetry
- 2012 Best New Poets
- Bread Loaf Writers' Conference Fellowship
- Kundiman Fellowship
- 2007-2008 Fulbright Scholarship

In 2016, Wong was featured among ten artists to mark the year to come, together with painter Ari Glass, dancer David Rue, and others.

== Works ==
- Kudzu Does Not Stop, United States : Organic Weapon Arts, 2012. ISBN 9780982710647, OCLC 862072312
- Overpour, Notre Dame, Indiana : Action Books, 2016. ISBN 9780900575914, OCLC 958799445
- How Not to Be Afraid of Everything, Alice James Books, 2021.
- Meet Me Tonight in Atlantic City, Portland, Oregon: Tin House, 2023.
