= Matthew Salesses =

Korean American writer

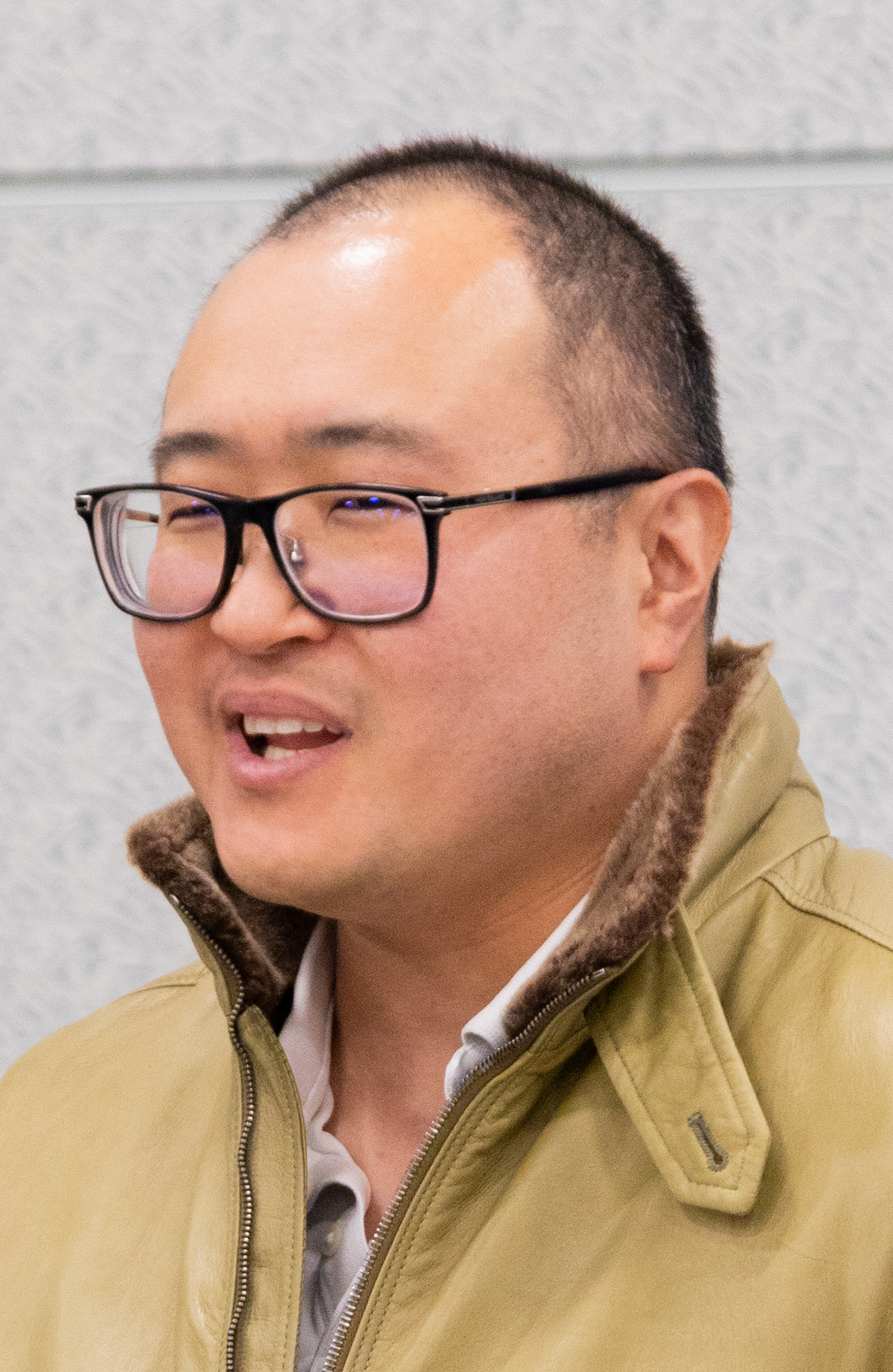
- Salesses at AWP 2025
- Education: University of North Carolina at Chapel Hill (BA); Emerson College (MFA); University of Houston (PhD)
- Occupations: Writer essayist
- Writing career
- Notable awards: PEN/Faulkner Finalist
- Website: matthewsalesses.com

Matthew Salesses is a Korean American fiction writer and essayist and associate professor of creative writing in the MFA program at Virginia Tech.

== Life ==
Salesses was born in South Korea and adopted by white American parents at age 2. He grew up in Storrs, Conn. and attended the University of North Carolina, Chapel Hill, where he studied English and creative writing. After college he taught English abroad, first in Prague and then in South Korea. He earned a Ph.D. in literature and creative writing from the University of Houston and an M.F.A. in Fiction from Emerson College. Salesses is currently an associate professor of creative writing at Virginia Tech.

== Work ==
Salesses is the author of the novel The Hundred-Year Flood (Little A, 2015). He is also the author of Disappear Doppelgänger Disappear: A Novel (Little A, 2020); Craft in the Real World (Catapult Books, 2021), an examination of American writing workshops and the incorporation of Asian storytelling traditions and methodology to broaden them; I'm Not Saying, I'm Just Saying (Civil Coping Mechanisms); Different Racisms: On Stereotypes, the Individual, and Asian American Masculinity (Thought Catalog Books); and The Last Repatriate (Nouvella).

In 2015 BuzzFeed named him one of 32 Essential Asian American Writers. His essays have been published in Best American Essays 2020, NPR Code Switch, The New York Times Motherlode, Glimmer Train, and VICE.com. He has received awards and fellowships from the Bread Loaf Writers’ Conference and Mid-American Review.

For years, he wrote about fiction craft and pedagogy for the Pleiades blog, where he was the Website Editor. He has taught at Tin House and Kundiman.

== Controversy ==
In 2023, Salesses faced controversy after he compelled his Columbia University graduate students to sign a contract indicating they would fail his course if they, among other restrictions, failed to "[n]ame the race and gender of any character at first introduction," used "banned terms," or followed his accounts on social media. Commenting on the controversy, Molly Bradley of Digg called these contractual provisions "the kind of thing a right-winger would invent as a hyperbolic parody of what progressive leftists want." In a subsequent statement to national media, Salesses expressed regret and rescinded "any kind of punishment" stated in the original contract.

== Bibliography ==
- The Last Repatriate (Nouvella, 2011)
- I'm Not Saying, I'm Just Saying (Civil Coping Mechanisms, 2013)
- The Hundred-Year Flood, (Little A, 2015).
- Different Racisms: On Stereotypes, the Individual, and Asian American Masculinity (Thought Catalog Books, 2017)
- Disappear Doppelgänger Disappear: A Novel (Little A, 2020)
- Craft in the Real World: Rethinking Fiction Writing and Workshopping (Catapult Books, 2021)
- The sense of wonder : a novel. New York: Little, Brown. 2023. (Note: Briefly reviewed in the February 6, 2023 issue of The New Yorker, p.65.)

———————

Bibliography notes
