= Asa Drake (poet) =

American poet

- Born: Kingstree, South Carolina, U.S.
- Education: The New School
- Occupation: Poet
- Writing career
- Language: English
- Genre: Poetry

For the fantasy fiction writer, see C. Dean Andersson

Asa Drake is an American poet of Filipino descent. Her debut collection, Maybe the Body, was published by Tin House. Her second collection, Beauty Talk, won the 2024 Noemi Press Book Award and will be published in October 2026.

== Early life ==
Drake was born in Kingstree, South Carolina. She studied poetry at The New School before moving to Central Florida where she worked for several years as a librarian.

== Career ==
In 2023, Drake released her debut chapbook, One Way to Listen, which won the 2021 Gold Line Press Poetry Chapbook Prize and later received a 2023 Florida Book Award.

In 2026, Drake released her debut full-length poetry collection, Maybe the Body, which was recognized in Ms. Magazine's "The Best Poetry of 2025 and 2026", "A Most Anticipated Book of 2026" from Debutiful and Garden & Gun and "A Favorite Poetry Collection of Winter" from Poetry Northwest.

Drake's work has been supported by the 92NY Discovery Poetry Contest and Sundress Publications. Her poetry has appeared in Poetry,Literary Hub, and American Poetry Review. She serves as an associate editor for the Beloit Poetry Journal.

== Bibliography ==
=== Poetry collections ===
- Beauty Talk (Noemi Press, 2026), ISBN 978-1-955992-73-2
- Maybe the Body (Tin House, 2026), ISBN 978-1-963108-68-2
- One Way to Listen (Gold Line Press, 2023) (chapbook), ISBN 978-1-938900-45-7
