= Asian American Literature Festival =

Literary event in Washington, D.C., U.S.

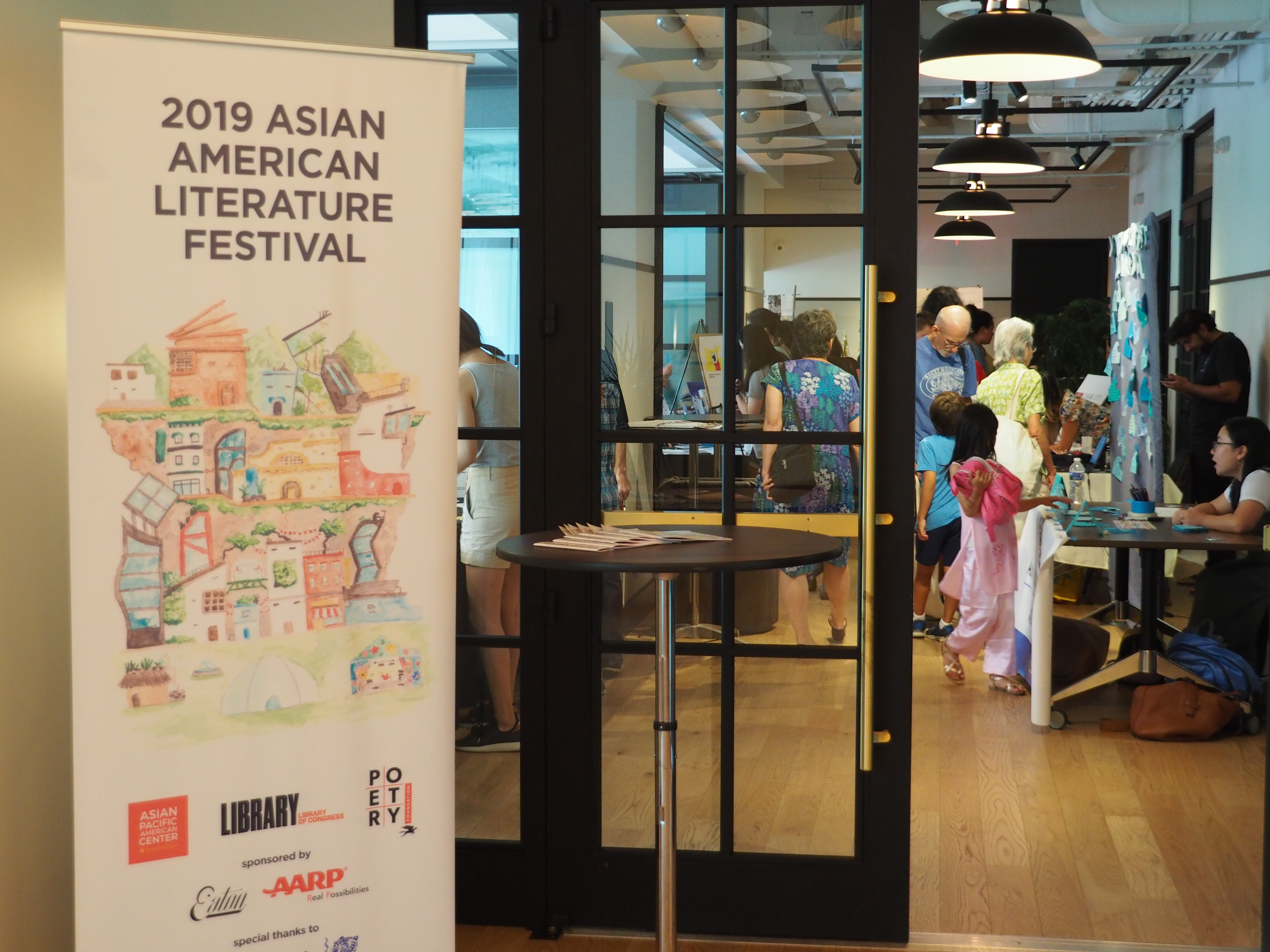
- Time: Biannual
- Location: Washington, D.C.
- Organised by: Smithsonian Asian Pacific American Center
- Website: smithsonianapa.org/lit/literature-festival/

The Asian American Literature Festival is a biannual Washington, D.C.–based literary festival dedicated to sharing and growing Asian American literature. It was first held in 2017.

== History ==
The Asian American Literature Festival is an event produced by the Smithsonian Asian Pacific American Center.

The first Asian American Literature Festival was held in 2017 at the National Portrait Gallery, Library of Congress, and The Phillips Collection. Major guests included Kazim Ali, Li-Young Lee and Karen Tei Yamashita.

The second Asian American Literature Festival was held in 2019 at the Eaton D.C. and The Library of Congress. Major guests included Kaveh Akbar, Monique Truong, and Arthur Sze.

In July 2023, Smithsonian leadership abruptly cancelled the event one month before its scheduled date, citing “unforeseen circumstances." The cancellation came as a surprise to thousands of planned attendees and partner organizations, including the governments of Australia and New Zealand who had spent nearly $90,000 in programming, flights, visas, and other costs. By 18 July, more than 70 authors and academics connected to the festival had signed an open letter decrying what they saw as a cancellation motivated by fear of controversy, citing the Smithsonian's recent review of "trans and nonbinary" programs that were planned as part of the festival.

In May 2024, the Washington Post announced that the Asian American Literature Festival would return in September without the Smithsonian. Instead, the festival is organized by "a collective of literary groups" including Kundiman and Kaya Press.
