= Imad Rahman =

Pakistani American fiction writer

- Born: Karachi, Pakistan
- Occupations: Writer; Professor
- Writing career
- Genre: Fiction

Imad Rahman is a Pakistani-American fiction writer whose first short story collection was published in 2004.

== Biography ==
A native of Karachi, Pakistan who immigrated to the United States at age 18 to attend college, Rahman was an assistant professor of English at Kansas State University, and, as of 2008, is an assistant professor of English at Cleveland State University, where he directs the Imagination Writers Conference. He is a graduate of Ohio Wesleyan University, and holds a Master of Arts from Ohio University and a Master of Fine Arts from the University of Florida. He was the James C. McCreight Fiction Fellow at the Wisconsin Institute for Creative Writing at the University of Wisconsin–Madison in 2001–2002.

The stories in I Dream of Microwaves feature a Pakistani actor who laments that he cant even get a job portraying as a criminal.

== Bibliography ==
Short Story Publications

- 2013: "The Brigadier-General Takes His Final Stand" in xo Orpheus
- 2005: "All Roads Lead to Flesh and Bone" in Willow Springs Literary Journal, Issue 55
- 2003: "Eating Ohio" in One Story, Issue 19
- 2001: "I Dream of Microwaves" in Gulf Coast Literary Journal

Books

- 2004: I Dream of Microwaves, short story collection
