= Tiana Nobile =

American poet

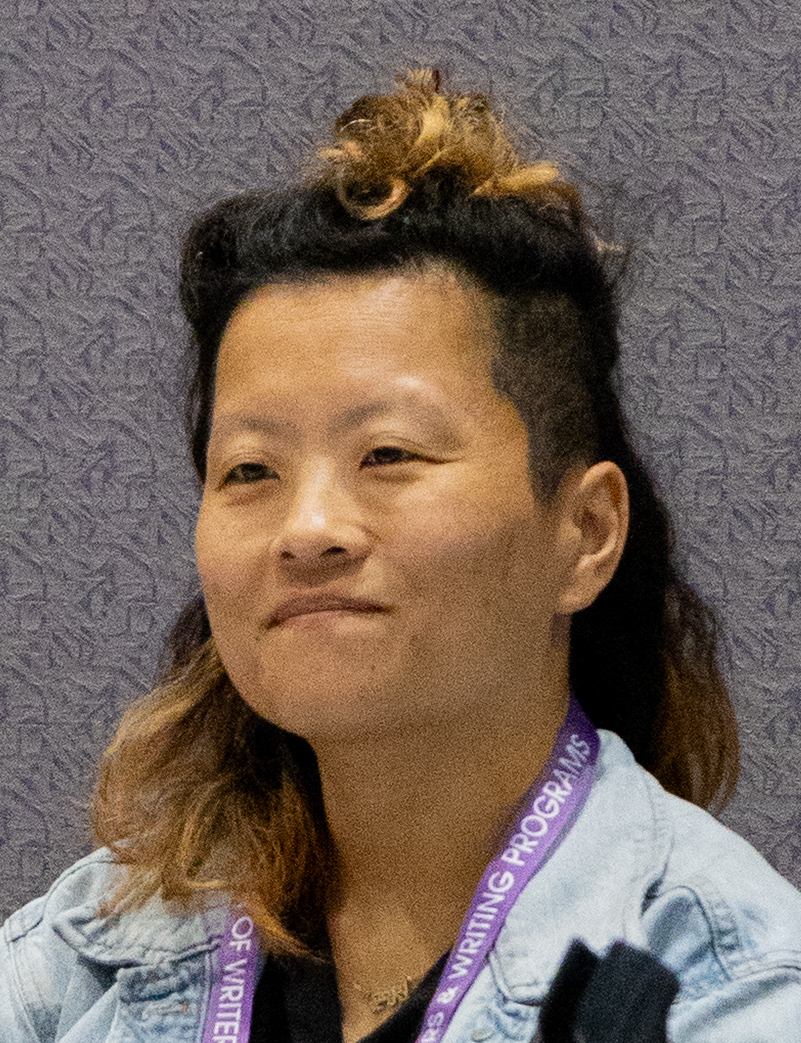
- Nobile at AWP 2025
- Education: Sarah Lawrence College (BA); University of New Orleans (MAT); Warren Wilson College (MFA)
- Occupation: Poet

Tiana Nobile is a poet based in New Orleans, Louisiana where she works at an arts education nonprofit called KID smART. She is a Korean American adoptee. Her debut collection of poetry, Cleave, was published by Hub City Press in the spring of 2021.

== Education and career ==
Nobile received her BA from Sarah Lawrence College, her MAT in elementary and special education from the University of New Orleans, and her MFA in Poetry from Warren Wilson College.

She is the author of the chapbook The Spirit of the Staircase, which was published in 2017 by Antenna, a New Orleans–based organization. Nobile collaborated with writer and interdisciplinary artist, Brigid Conroy, whose artwork appears throughout the chapbook. In an interview with Hyphen, Nobile said the title of her chapbook comes from the French phrase, l’esprit de l’escalier, which “refers to the feeling you get when someone says something to you and you think of the perfect response or comeback 20 minutes later as you’re walking away down the stairs."

Nobile is a recipient of a 2017 Rona Jaffe Foundation Writers' Award and the Lucy Grealy Prize for Poetry from Sarah Lawrence College. She was a finalist for the National Poetry Series and the Kundiman Poetry Prize. A Kundiman Fellow, Nobile has been nominated for a Pushcart Prize.
