= Lucy Tan =

American writer

Lucy Tan is an American writer. She is the author of What We Were Promised, which was released by Little, Brown, & Company in 2018.

== Life ==
Tan was raised in New Jersey, and splits her time between New York City and Shanghai. Her parents are from Wuhan, China. As a teenager, she traveled to China with a program meant to acquaint Chinese Americans with their parents' homeland. She moved to Shanghai after college, although she later moved back to the United States. When Tan was younger, she aspired to be an actor as well as a writer, and once appeared in a 2005 promo for MTV's My Super Sweet 16 alongside Jennifer Lawrence.

== Writing ==
Tan won the 2015 Ploughshares Emerging Writers' Contest for her short story "Safety of Numbers".

Tan received her MFA in creative writing from the University of Wisconsin–Madison, where she won the 2016 August Derleth Prize. Tan was also a 2018–2019 James C. McCreight Fiction Fellow at the University of Wisconsin–Madison.

Her first novel, What We Were Promised, came out in 2018. Her second novel, Tiger's Mouth, was published in 2026.

Tan is a Kundiman Fiction Fellow.

=== What We Were Promised ===
What We Were Promised follows a China-born family, the Zhens, who spent years in the United States before returning to Shanghai. Tan spent two years after college living with her parents in a luxury hotel, and this became the setting for her novel.

Publishers Weekly writes What We Were Promised "presents an intriguing portrait of class, duty, and family."

USA Today writes: "What We Were Promised glows through its intimate, skillful prose. Tan's debut is a beautiful reckoning with the ever-changing definition of home – what it means to have, lose and find family again."

Kirkus Reviews writes: "In the Zhen household, Tan brings us a microcosm of the conflicts among China's larger populations [...] in this portrait of people learning how to live after a period of immense repression."
