= Defacing the Monument =

2020 book of poetry criticism

- Cover of the first edition
- Author: Susan Briante
- Language: English
- Series: Infidel Poetics Series
- Genre: Essays, poetry criticism
- Publisher: Noemi Press
- Publication date: August 2020
- Publication place: United States
- Media type: Print (paperback), e-book
- Pages: 162
- ISBN: 978-1-934819-90-6

Defacing the Monument is a 2020 book of essays and poetry criticism by Susan Briante. Published by Noemi Press in the Infidel Poetics Series, it addresses immigration, documentary poetics, archives, aesthetics, and state power, especially in relation to the United States–Mexico border.

== Reception ==
In the Los Angeles Review of Books, Marie Scarles situated the book in relation to Muriel Rukeyser's documentary poetics. Publishers Weekly gave the book a starred review, calling it "a superb examination of the ethical issues facing artists who tell others' stories", while Sandra Simonds in The Georgia Review wrote that it is "a work that considers the ethical quandaries of writing itself". Kirkus Reviews described the book as a work about migration and border security, though its review was more critical, calling it "well-meaning but shallow".

== Awards ==
In 2021, the book received the Poetry Foundation's Pegasus Award for Poetry Criticism.
