= Monica Sok =

Cambodian American poet

Monica Sok is a Cambodian American poet and professor. In 2015, she published Year Zero, a poetry chapbook selected by Marilyn Chin for the 2015 Poetry Society of America Chapbook Fellowship, and in 2020, she released the poetry collection A Nail the Evening Hangs On with Copper Canyon Press. Themes of her work include myth-making, Cambodian history, intergenerational trauma, and family history.

== Early life ==
Sok is the daughter of Cambodian refugees who escaped from Phnom Penh on April 17, 1975. She grew up in Lancaster, Pennsylvania. Her family includes many Theravada Buddhists. Sok's grandmother, Em Bun, was a Cambodian American weaver who was awarded a National Endowment for the Arts National Heritage Fellowship in 1990.

During her time at American University, Sok became interested in rhyming and attended open mic events near campus. She then graduated with a Bachelor of Arts in International Studies and considered becoming a foreign service officer.

After graduating, Sok attended creative writing workshops and also briefly observed a class taught by Yusef Komunyakaa at New York University. Encouraged by her poetry professor, David Keplinger, she applied for and enrolled in an MFA in Creative Writing program there.

== Career ==
Sok's poems have been published in The Washington Post, Poets.org, New England Review, Paris Review, Virginia Quarterly Review, Narrative Magazine, and more. She has also been interviewed by Electric Literature, LitHub, The Normal School, and other outlets.

As a graduate student, Sok attended the Kundiman Retreat and became a Kundiman Fellow, which helped her write about Cambodian history and, in particular, the Cambodian genocide. Later, in 2015, Sok published won the Poetry Society of America Chapbook Fellowship with her chapbook, Year Zero, which was selected by Marilyn Chin. 500 copies were printed.

From 2016 to 2018, Sok was the Stradler Fellow in Poetry at Bucknell University. In 2016, Sok attended the Hedgebrook residency for women writers. In 2017, she received a National Endowment for the Arts Literature Fellowship. In 2018, Sok won the 92Y Discovery/Boston Review Poetry Contest, alongside Paul Tran, for her poem titled "ABC for Refugees", which was originally published in Poetry. The same year, she attended the Montalvo Arts Center as a Literary Fellow at the Lucas Arts Program.

From 2018 to 2020, Sok was a Stegner Fellow at Stanford University. In 2020, she released her debut poetry collection, A Nail the Evening Hangs On. The same year, she became a Jones Lecturer at Stanford University and occasionally taught classes on Asian American literature. She has also taught Southeast Asian youth at the Center for Empowering Refugees and Immigrants in Oakland, California where she is based.

In 2022, Sok attended MacDowell and worked on a second poetry collection, as well as a screenplay. From 2023–2024, she was selected to be the Soniat Reader in poetry for the Virginia Tech MFA in Creative Writing.
