= Vievee Francis =

American poet

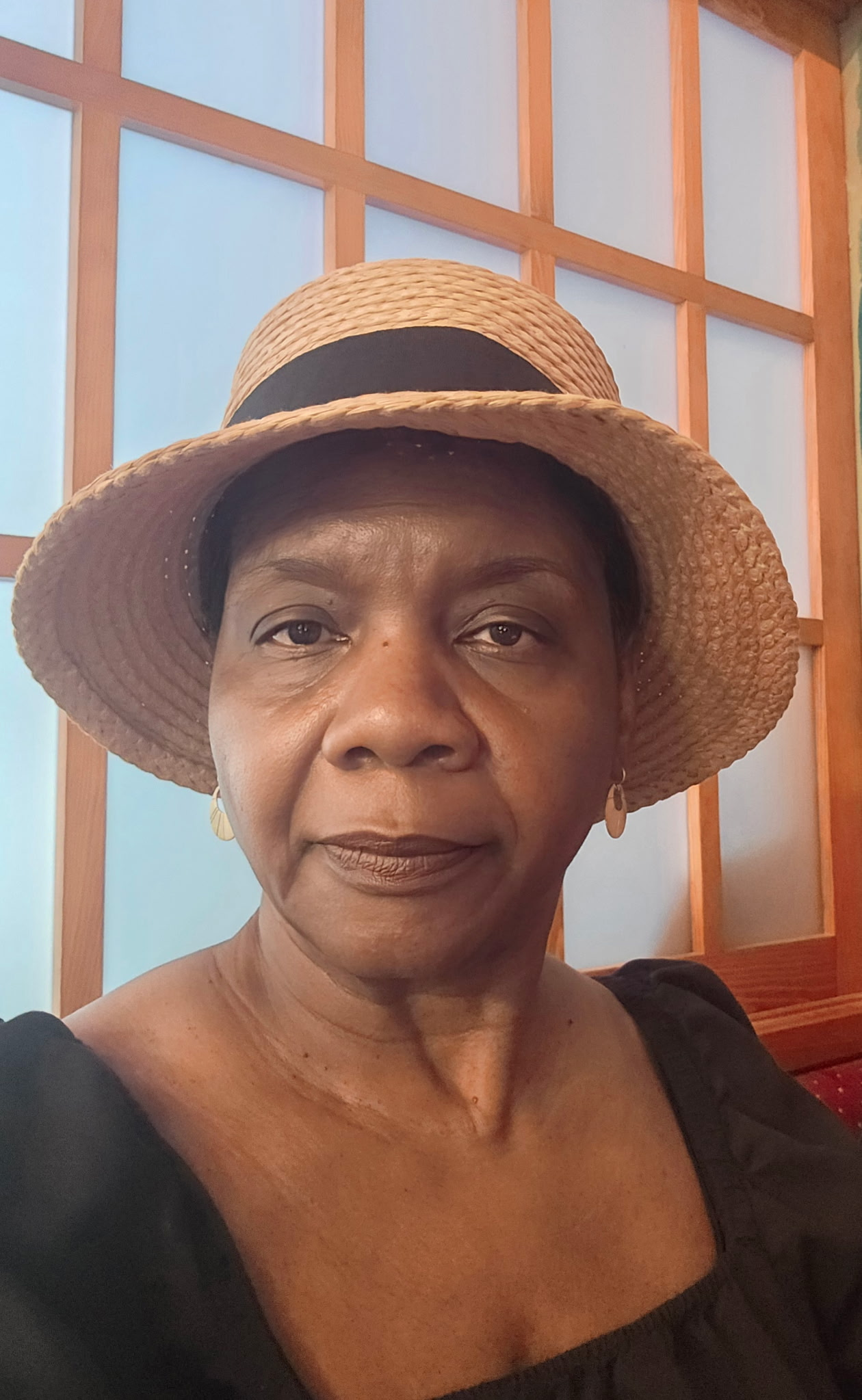
- Born: December 31, 1963, Texas, U.S.
- Education: Fisk University; University of Michigan
- Spouse: Matthew Olzmann
- Writing career
- Notable awards: Kingsley and Kate Tufts Poetry Awards, Aiken Taylor Award for Modern American Poetry, Hurston/Wright Legacy Award, Rona Jaffe Foundation Writers' Award, Guggenheim Fellow

Vievee Elaure Francis (/vaɪˈviː/) is an American poet. She holds the Burlington Northern Foundation Professorship in Creative Writing at Dartmouth College. She earned an MFA from the University of Michigan in 2009, and she received a Rona Jaffe Award the same year. Vievee is the author of four collections of the poetry, the third of which, Forest Primeval, won the 2016 Hurston/Wright Legacy Award for poetry and the 2017 Kingsley Tufts (Kingsley and Kate Tufts Poetry Awards) poetry award.

== Early life ==
Francis is a native of Texas. She was born in San Angelo.

== Career ==
She worked for 15 years in Detroit, Michigan, with a literary community of young-adult and adult poets. From there, she moved to North Carolina where she taught undergraduates at Warren Wilson College and North Carolina State University. Francis holds the Burlington Northern Foundation Professorship in Creative Writing at Dartmouth College.

== Awards ==
In 2021, The Sewanee Review announced Francis as the recipient of the 2021 Aiken Taylor Award for Modern American Poetry.

Writing for the judging committee for the Kingsley and Kate Tufts Poetry Awards, Don Share, editor of Poetry magazine praised Forest Primeval as "an intense work, dark … Dantean … dreamlike in its visions.... Francis is reclaiming modernist and feminist legacies of poetry, and it takes great courage to do that."

== Personal life ==
Francis is married to poet Matthew Olzmann, a native of Detroit and author of three books of poetry, Constellation Route (Alice James Books), Contradictions in the Design (Alice James Books), and Mezzanines (Alice James Books).
