= Noemi Press =

American nonprofit literary press

- Logo of Noemi Press
- Founded: 2002; 24 years ago
- Founder: Carmen Giménez
- Country of origin: United States
- Publication types: Poetry, Fiction, Nonfiction, Criticism
- Official website: www.noemipress.org

Noemi Press is an independent, nonprofit, 501(c)(3) publisher. Noemi Press was founded in 2002 by Carmen Giménez to publish and promote the work of emerging and established writers, with a special emphasis on writers traditionally underrepresented by larger publishers, including women, BIPOC, and LGBTQIAP writers.

Noemi publishes roughly five books a year, including the Noemi Press Awards in Poetry, the Etel Adnan Poetry Prize, and the Andrés Montoya Poetry Prize. They also collaborate with Letras Latinas to produce the Akrilica series.

== History ==
Publisher and editor-in-chief Carmen Giménez and founding editor Evan Lavender-Smith began Noemi Press in 2002 by publishing a single chapbook. It has grown to include full-length poetry, nonfiction, and critical work. Noemi publications previously included drama and fiction. Noemi Press was previously based in Las Cruces, New Mexico and is currently based in Tucson, Arizona and Blacksburg, Virginia. In 2022, Giménez left Noemi to become Executive Editor and Publisher at Graywolf Press. Noemi is now co-published by Suzi F. Garcia and Anthony Cody, with Sarah Gzemski acting as Executive Director and Mariah Bosch as Managing Editor. Its editorial staff includes Diana Arterian, Sara Borjas, and Emily Kiernan.

== Noemi Press Book Award ==
The Noemi Press Book Award is an annual American literary award for a book-length poetry manuscript. It carries a cash prize of $2,000 and publication with Noemi Press. The award is judged by Noemi Press's editorial staff and is open to poets at any stage of their career. The press formerly also awarded a prize in prose, but the current contest is for poetry only.

Winners of the Noemi Press Book Award
Year	Poetry	Prose	Ref.
2025	K Tiao	—	
2024	Asa Drake	—	
2023	Kinsey Cantrell	—	
2022	Zefyr Lisowski	Alvina Chamberland	
2021	Casey Rocheteau	Christine Hume	
2020	Nilufar Karimi	Jackson Bliss	
2019	Aeon Ginsberg	Sarah Minor	
2018	Lillian-Yvonne Bertram	Stephanie Sauer	
2017	Jessica Rae Bergamino	Kate Colby	
2016	Natalie Eilbert	Sara Veglahn	
2015	Muriel Leung	Yanara Friedland	
2014	Aichlee Bushnell	Nate Liederbach	
2013	Ruth Ellen Kocher	Caren Beilin	

== Etel Adnan Poetry Prize ==
The Etel Adnan Poetry Prize is an American literary award for a first or second book of poetry in English by a writer of Arab heritage. Established in 2015, the prize was originally administered by University of Arkansas Press and moved to Noemi Press in 2025. The series is edited by poets Hayan Charara and Fady Joudah, and is named in honor of the Lebanese-American writer and artist Etel Adnan. Under Noemi Press, the winner will receive $2,000, publication in the U.S. by Noemi Press, and publication in the U.K. by Out-Spoken Press.

Winners of the Etel Adnan Poetry Prize
Year	Winner	Collection	Publisher	Ref.
2026	Antony Fangary	sour river	Noemi Press	
2024	Rawand Mustafa	Umbilical Discord	University of Arkansas Press	
2023	A. D. Lauren-Abunassar	Coriolis	University of Arkansas Press	
2022	Maya Salameh	How to Make an Algorithm in the Microwave	University of Arkansas Press	
2021	Danielle Badra	Like We Still Speak	University of Arkansas Press	
2020	Jessica Abughattas	Strip	University of Arkansas Press	
2019	Zaina Alsous	A Theory of Birds	University of Arkansas Press	
2018	Peter Twal	Our Earliest Tattoos	University of Arkansas Press	
2017	Jess Rizkallah	the magic my body becomes	University of Arkansas Press	

== Andrés Montoya Poetry Prize ==
Initially a biannual award housed at the University of Notre Dame's Institute for Latino Studies and started by Letras Latinas in 2004 in honor of Andrés Montoya, this prize is for first a poetry collection by a US-based Latinx poet. In 2026, Noemi became the new home for the Andrés Montoya Poetry Prize, making it annual. The winner receives $2,000.

Winners of the Andrés Montoya Poetry Prize
Year	Winner	Collection	Judge	Publisher	Ref.
2024	María Esquinca	Where Heaven Sinks	Juan Felipe Herrera	University of Notre Dame Press	
2022	Jordan Pérez	Santa Tarantula	Alexandra Lytton Regalado & Sheila Maldonado	University of Notre Dame Press	
2020	Darrel Alejandro Holnes	Stepmotherland	John Murillo	University of Notre Dame Press	
2018	Heidi Andrea Restrepo Rhodes	The Inheritance of Haunting	Ada Limón	University of Notre Dame Press	
2016	Felicia Zamora	Of Form & Gather	Edwin Torres	University of Notre Dame Press	
2014	David Campos	Furious Dusk	Rhina P. Espaillat	University of Notre Dame Press	
2012	Laurie Ann Guerrero	A Tongue in the Mouth of the Dying	Francisco X. Alarcón	University of Notre Dame Press	
2010	Emma Trelles	Tropicalia	Silvia Curbelo	University of Notre Dame Press	
2008	Paul Martínez Pompa	My Kill Adore Him	Martín Espada	University of Notre Dame Press	
2006	Gabriel Gomez	The Outer Bands	Valerie Martínez	University of Notre Dame Press	
2004	Sheryl Luna	Pity the Drowned Horses	Robert Vazquez	University of Notre Dame Press	

== AKRILICA Series ==
AKRLILICA is a co-publishing venture with Letras Latinas which seeks to showcase new innovative Latinx writing. The name of the series alludes to the groundbreaking, bilingual poetry book by distinguished Chicanx writer and former United States Poet Laureate, Juan Felipe Herrera. Authors included in the AKRILICA series include Manuel Paul López, Vanessa Angélica Villarreal, Jennif(f)er Tamayo, Carolina Ebeid, Chloe Garcia Roberts, Roberto Harrison, elena minor, and Sandy Florian.

== Infidel Poetics Series ==
The Infidel Poetics Series is a venue for shorter critical works addressing the overlap between poetry and politics, often interrogating notions of identity. The Infidel Poetics Series is named after poet-scholar Daniel Tiffany's 2009 essay collection Infidel Poetics. Infidel authors include: Roberto Tejada, Douglas Kearney, Susan Briante (author of Defacing the Monument), and Sarah Vap.

== Post-Publication Prizes ==
- Erin L. McCoy — 2026 Florida Book Award winner in poetry for Wrecks
- Zefyr Lisowski — 2025 Lambda Literary Award Winner in Transgender Poetry for Girl Work
- Casey Rocheteau — 2022 PEN Open Book Award finalist for Gorgoneion
- Claire Hong — 2021 PEN/Voelcker Award for Poetry semifinalist for Upend
- Susan Briante — 2021 Pegasus Award winner for Defacing the Monument
- Nicholas Wong — 2021 Lambda Literary Award finalist in Gay Poetry for Besiege Me
- Lillian-Yvonne Bertram — 2020 National Book Award finalist for Travesty Generator
- Sara Borjas — 2020 American Book Award winner for Heart Like a Window, Mouth Like a Cliff
- Aeon Ginsberg — 2020 Lambda Literary Award finalist in Transgender Poetry for Greyhound
- Vanessa Angélica Villarreal — 2019 Whiting Award winner and Kate Tufts Discovery Award finalist for Beast Meridian
- Roque Raquel Salas Rivera — 2019 Lambda Literary Award winner in Transgender Poetry for o terciario/the tertiary (originally published by Timeless, Infinite Light)
- chaun webster — 2019 Minnesota Book Award in Poetry for GeNtry!fication: Or the Scene of the Crime
- Vanessa Angélica Villarreal — 2018 Texas Institute of Letters Poetry Prize for Beast Meridian
- Roque Raquel Salas Rivera — 2018 National Book Award semifinalist for o terciario/the tertiary (originally published by Timeless, Infinite Light)
