= Matthew Olzmann =

American poet

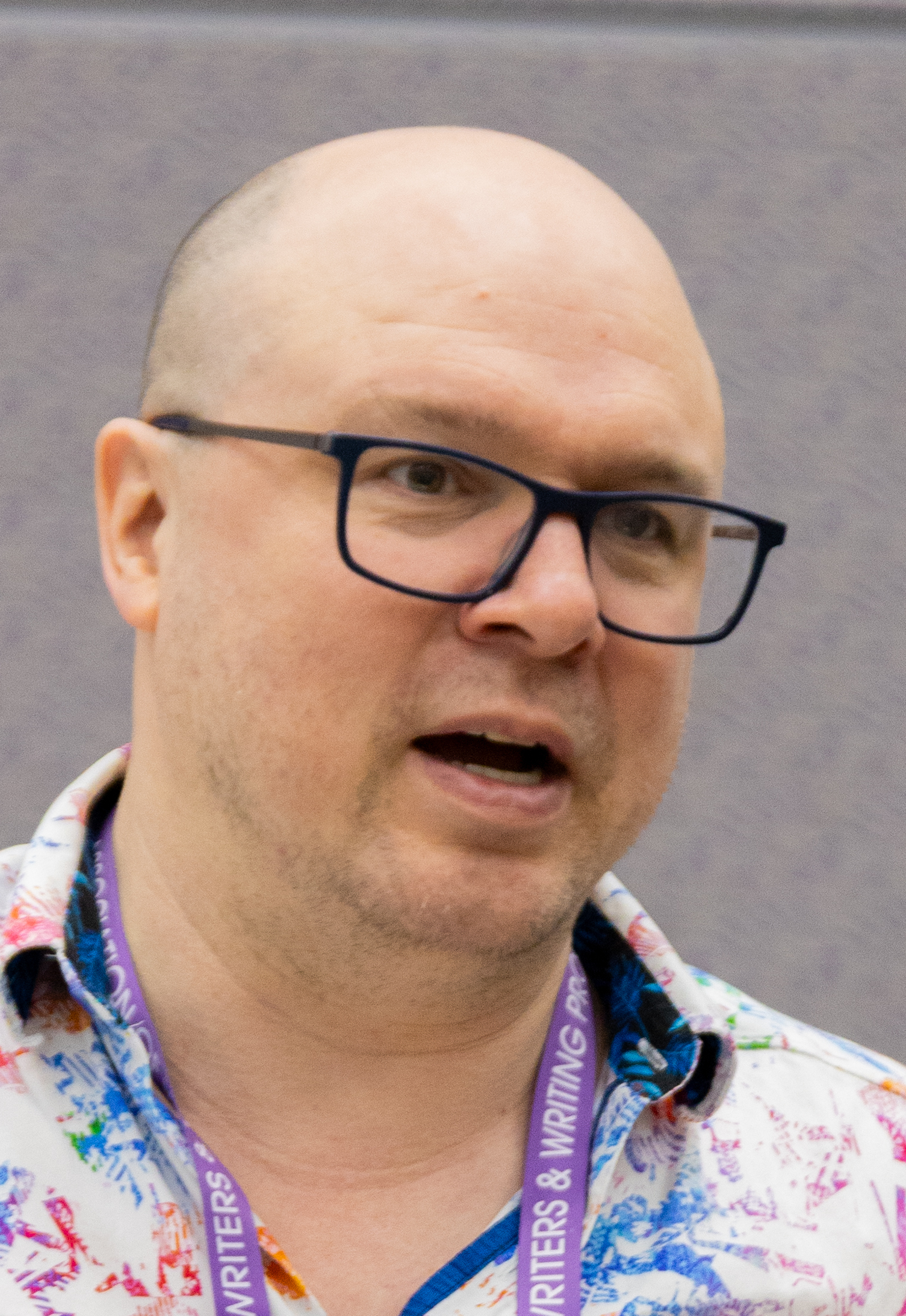
- Born: Detroit
- Education: University of Michigan–Dearborn, Warren Wilson College
- Employers: Dartmouth College; Warren Wilson College
- Awards: Kundiman Fellowship; MacDowell Fellowship

Matthew Olzmann is a poet, author, and essayist.

== Personal life ==
Matthew Olzmann was born in Detroit, Michigan. He currently teaches at Dartmouth College, and the MFA program at Warren Wilson College. Olzmann is married to poet Vievee Francis.

== Career ==
Olzmann completed a BA at the University of Michigan-Dearborn and an MFA from Warren Wilson College.

He has had poems, stories, and essays appear in various publications, such as Best American Poetry, Kenyon Review, New England Review, Salt Hill, Margie, Atlanta Review, Necessary Fiction, Brevity, Southern Review, and elsewhere.

Olzmann is the author of three poetry publications. In 2012, Olzmann edited Another & Another: An Anthology from the Grind Daily Writing Series along with Ross White. His debut collection, Mezzanines, was published by Alice James Books in 2013, which won the Kundiman Prize. In November 2016, Olzmann published his second collection, Contradictions in the Design, also from Alice James Books. In January 2022, his third book of poems, Constellation Route, was published by Alice James Books.

He has received the Kresge Arts Foundation fellowship and a National Endowment for the Arts Fellowship.

Olzmann is currently an Assistant Professor in the Department of English & Creative Writing at Dartmouth College in New Hampshire USA.

== Awards and fellowships ==
- Kresge Arts Foundation Literary Arts Fellow (2010)
- Bread Loaf Writer's Conference Robert Frost Fellow in Poetry (2016)
- Kundiman Fellowship
- Kundiman Prize (2011)
- Kenyon Review Writer's Workshop
- The MacDowell Colony Poetry Fellowship (2018)
- National Endowment of the Arts Fellowship (2021)

== Works ==
- Mezzanines (2013), Alice James Books
- Contradictions in the Design (2016), Alice James Books
- Constellation Route (2022), Alice James Books
