= Muriel Leung =

American writer

Muriel Leung is an American writer. Her work includes the poetry collection Bone Confetti, which won the 2015 Noemi Press Book Award and Imagine Us, The Swarm, which received the Nightboat's Poetry Prize. She has received multiple writing fellowships, and her work was nominated for a Pushcart Prize.

== Early life ==
Leung grew up in Richmond Hills, New York. Her first language is Cantonese. She learned English in elementary school. On her mother's side, she has family members who were garment workers on Manhattan's Lower East Side. Her father emigrated to the United States from Hong Kong under refugee status, and went on to own a restaurant. She received her undergraduate degree from Sarah Lawrence College.

== Career ==
While working on her MFA at Louisiana State University, Leung completed her poetry collection Bone Confetti, which won the 2015 Noemi Press Book Award. Noemi Press published Bone Confetti the following year. The collection, which is divided into four sections, contemplates grief, loss, trauma and queerness. The book discusses the death of Leung's father, who died of stage 4 pancreatic cancer. The book also plays with the Orpheus and Eurydice myth. A review about the book in Hyperallergic states, "The poems can be grisly, gothic, and obsessed, not to mention quirky and disturbing. As much as you may suspect that Leung is possessed, you also feel that she is in control of every word she places on the page. The poems can be cool and feverish. They can be funny, odd, opaque. We cannot see through them to her, and why should we?"

Leung's work often addresses identity. Also in 2016, Fairy Tale Review nominated her poem "How to Fall in Love in a Time of Unnamable Disaster" for a Pushcart Prize. In a review of her poem "I was a house / I was a witch " for the Ploughshares blog, John Rufo said that the poem "functions to present intermingling transformations that perform whatever an opposite of distillation forecloses".

She is a co-host of the Blood-Jet Writing Hour poetry podcast along with American Book Award winner Rachelle Cruz. Leung received fellowships from Kundiman and Voices of Our Nation Arts Foundation. She is a co-editor at Apogee Journal and a contributing editor at Bettering American Poetry. She served as Assistant Editor of New Delta Review.

About her forthcoming collection, Imagine Us, The Swarm, Kazim Ali wrote: “Muriel Leung’s Imagine Us, The Swarm offers seven powerful texts that form a constellation of voices, forms, and approaches to confront loneliness, silence, and death. In a varied range of physical and poetic shapes and typography, Leung creates a lyric informed by theory, autobiography, and essay. One finds in the margins of this book deep dimensional portals of thought that resonate wildly. This book leads one deep into psychic regions oft unplumbed. Its rigors are complex and yet a reader feels nothing so much as invited in, and the rewards are plentiful and profound.”

Leung's novel How to Fall in Love in a Time of Unnameable Disaster won the 2025 Lambda Literary Award in Bisexual Nonfiction.

== Personal life ==
Leung identifies as an “Asian American poet.” She is a doctoral student in creative writing at USC and resides in Los Angeles.

== Bibliography ==
- Bone Confetti, Noemi Press, 2016, ISBN 9781934819609
- Imagine Us, the Swarm, Nightboat Books, 2021
- How to Fall in Love in a Time of Unnameable Disaster: A Novel, W. W. Norton & Co., 2024, ISBN 9781324076186
