= Janine Joseph =

Filipina-American poet and author

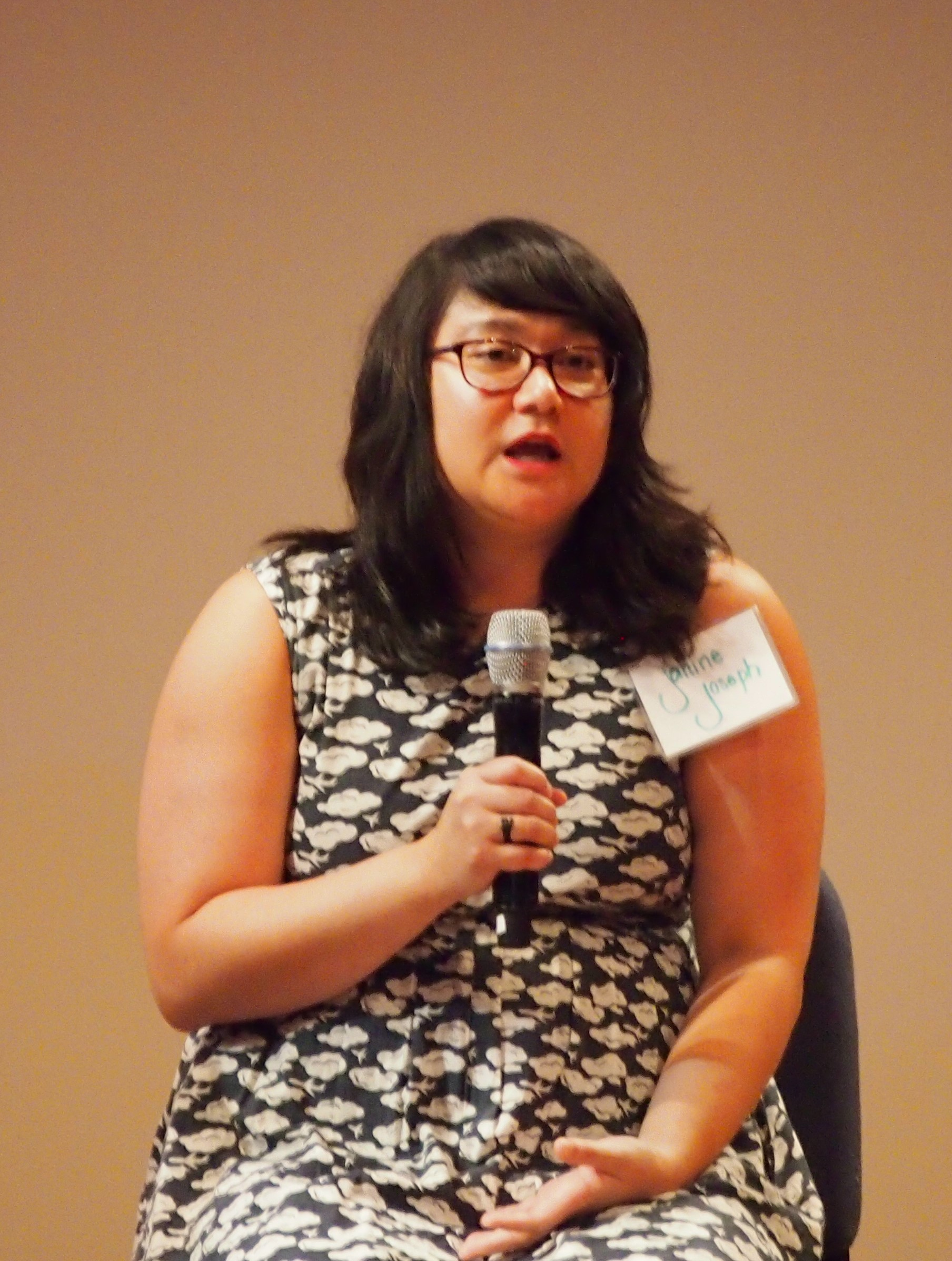
- Born: Philippines
- Education: University of California, Riverside, New York University, University of Houston
- Writing career
- Genre: Poetry

Janine Joseph is a Filipino-American poet and author.

== Early life and influences ==
Janine Joseph was born in the Philippines. Her father, at the time, worked for President Corazon Aquino. He held a strong belief that if they stayed then their children would never learn the values of hard work and would inherit the social and economic status that their family had in the Philippines. In 1991, Joseph and her family immigrated to California on tourist visas, where the family had previously visited multiple times before. First settling in Riverside, California, then in Arizona.

She spent many years not knowing that she was undocumented, until colleges began to refuse her financial aid because of her status. Nonetheless, it was events like this that influenced her to write poetry. While she was attending a writer's retreat in 2003, while also being enrolled in Riverside Community College, she met laureate Natasha Trethewey, who would later become a future poet. After completing her education at Riverside Community College, she later transferred to UC Riverside, and followed up on graduate programs for writing, in New York and Houston. It was during this time, she began to write more poetry and essays, that were focused on her growing up undocumented in America.

She graduated from New York University, and the University of Houston. She taught at Weber State University, and Oklahoma State University.

== Bibliography ==
=== Essays ===
- "Language of the Border." VIDA: Women in Literary Arts. VIDA Exclusive. May 2015. Online.
- "Forum: ‘MFA vs POC.’"The Asian American Literary Review. Fall/Winter 2015 Issue. Print and Online.
- "Undocumented, and Riding Shotgun." What It Means to Be American. Zócalo Public Square (in partnership with the Smithsonian’s National Museum of American History): January 2015. Online.
- "Undocumented, and Riding Shotgun" (abridged reprints). KCRW: Which Way, L.A.? and For the Curious. January 2015. Online.
- "The Exemplary Poem and the Exemplary Life." The Press at California State University Fresno & Greenhouse Review Press: 2013. Print.

=== Poems ===
- "Leaving the Non-Profit Immigration Lawyer's Office," "'More milk, more milk makes it better,'" and "Human Archipelago." Resist Much/Obey Little: Inaugural Poems to the Resistance. Michael Boughn, John Bradley, Brenda Cardenas, et al., eds. Dispatches Edition: 2017. Print. Forthcoming.
- "Between Chou and the Butterfly." Best American Experimental Writing 2015. Douglas Kearney, ed. Seth Abramson and Jesse Damiani, series eds. Wesleyan University Press: CT, 2015. Print.
- “Wreck.” Best New Poets 2011. D.A. Powell, ed. Jazzy Danziger and Jeb Livingood, series eds. University of Virginia Press: VA, 2011. 6. Print.
- "Driving without a license." Here is a Pen: An Anthology of West Coast Kundiman Poets. Ching-In Chen, Margaret Rhee, and Debbie Yee, eds. Achiote Press: Berkeley, CA, 2009. 7. Print.
- "Junkyarding through the great Moreno Valley." Breathe: 101 Contemporary Odes. Ryan G. Van Cleave and Chad Prevost, eds. C & R Press: Chattanooga, TN, 2009. 109-10. Print. "Second Lesson (Circle Inn)," "Junkyarding through the great Moreno Valley," and "TheUndocumented Immigrant Poem # 79." Bear Flag Republic: Prose Poems and Poetics from California. Christopher Buckley and Gary Young, eds. Greenhouse Review Press/Alcatraz Editions: Santa Cruz, CA, 2008. 218-19. Print.
- “Anilao, 1989." Homage to Vallejo. Christopher Buckley, ed. Greenhouse Review Press: Santa Cruz, CA, 2006. 36-7. Print.

=== Books ===
- Decade of the Brain. Alice James Books, 2023. ISBN 978-1-948579-30-8
- Driving without a License. Alice James Books, 2016. ISBN 9781938584381

=== Operas ===
- From My Mother's Mother (2012)
- What Wings They Were: The Case of Emeline (With Mark Davidson)

== Awards and honors ==
- Winner of a 2024 Virginia Literary Award (for Decade of the Brain)
- Finalist, 2017 Oklahoma Book Award (Poetry)
- Member. Undocupoets. Current.
- Contributing Editor, Tongue: A Journal of Writing & Art. Current.
- Howard Nemerov Poetry Scholarship (Sewanee Writers' Conference), 2016.
- Robert M. Hogge Teaching Award, 2015.
- Philippine American Writers and Artists, Inc. (PAWA) Manuel G. Flores Prize, 2014.
- Kundiman Poetry Prize, 2014 (for Driving without a License)
- Inprint/Barthelme Fellowship in Poetry, 2013.
- Paul & Daisy Soros Fellowship for New Americans, 2009-2011.
