= Bonnie Chau =

American author

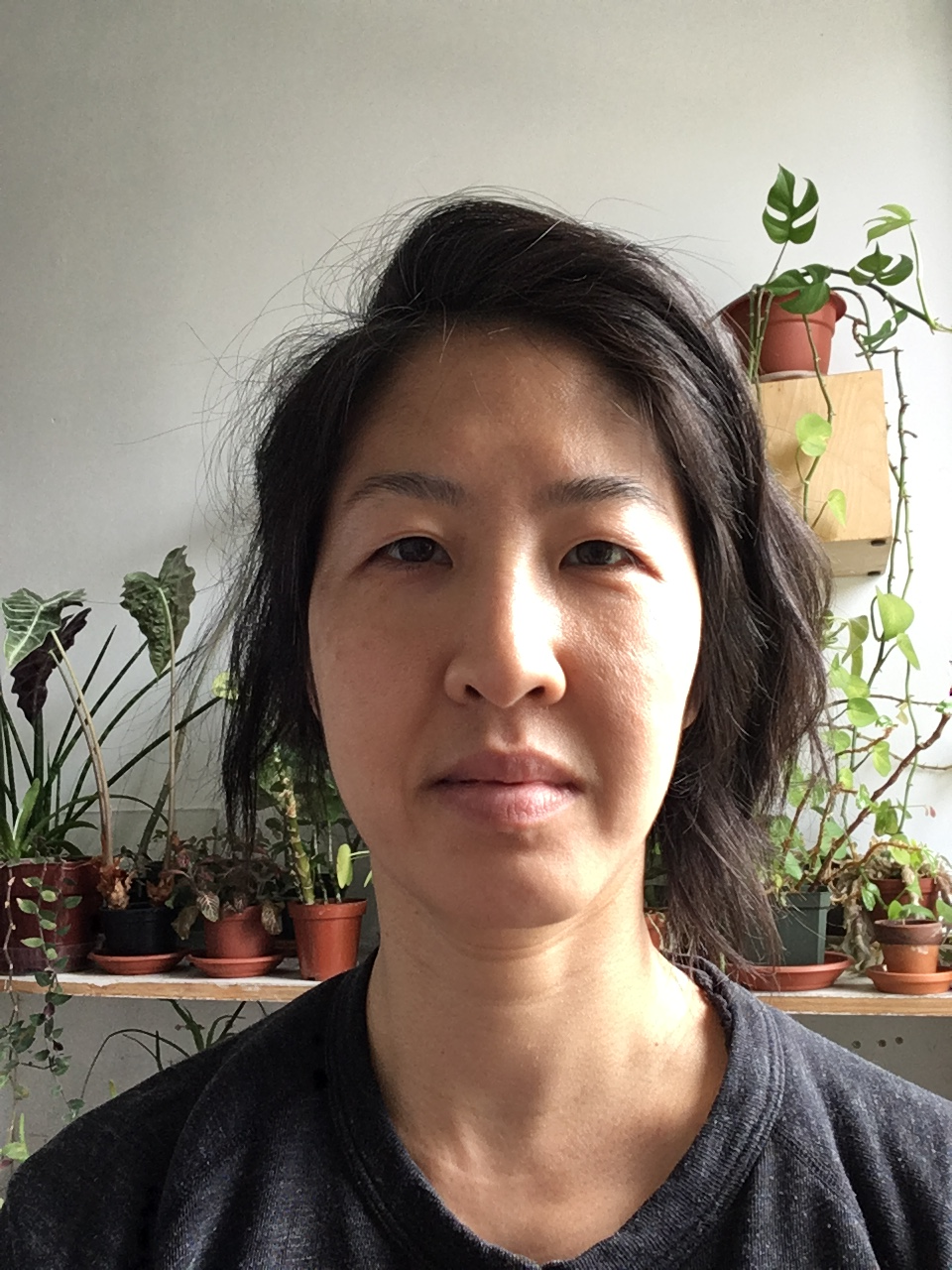
- Chau, May 2020
- Born: Orange County, California, United States
- Occupation: Author
- Writing career
- Genre: Short stories
- Notable work: All Roads Lead to Blood
- Website: bonniechau.com

Bonnie Chau is an American author of short stories. Her debut collection of short stories, All Roads Lead to Blood, received the 2040 Books Prize.

== Life and career ==
Chau was born and raised in Orange County, California. She credits the Southern California environment as one of the main catalysts for her development "as a writer, as a person, as a body". She attended college at UCLA, where she studied art history and English literature. She also wrote an opinion column for UCLA's student newspaper, the Daily Bruin. Chau then received an MFA in fiction and literary translation from Columbia University.

Chau's collection of short stories, All Roads Lead to Blood, was published in 2018 to critical acclaim. All Roads Lead to Blood has been described as "honest and arresting," with the Community of Literary Magazines and Presses saying that "Chau’s bold portrayals of second-generation Chinese-American women, their trials and desires, memories and identities, make this collection a Summer Reading must."

In addition to publishing All Roads Lead to Blood, Chau has previously worked for 826LA, an LA-based nonprofit dedicated to teaching writing skills to students. She has been published in Flaunt Magazine, The Offing, Joyland, and elsewhere. A Kundiman fellow, Chau currently serves as an editor at Poets & Writers and at Public Books.

== Works ==
- All Roads Lead to Blood (166 pages, SFWP/2040 Books, 2018, ISBN 9781939650870)
