= Maybe The Body =

2026 poetry collection by Asa Drake

- Front cover of first edition
- Author: Asa L. Drake
- Language: English
- Genre: Poetry
- Publisher: Tin House
- Publication date: February 24, 2026
- Publication place: United States
- Media type: Print (paperback), ebook
- Pages: 96
- ISBN: 978-1-963108-68-2

Maybe The Body is a 2026 poetry collection by Asa L. Drake, published by Tin House. It is Drake's debut full-length poetry collection.

In interviews about the book, Drake said that many of the poems were written after she returned to the South, and described the collection as engaging with questions of belonging and diaspora.

== Reception ==
Publishers Weekly described the collection as "cerebral" and "polyphonic", saying that its poems address assimilation, ambivalent patriotism, and family inheritance. A.D. Lauren-Abunassar, reviewing the book for Split Lip Magazine, wrote that it examines how the body is shaped by country, inheritance, and labor, and described it as having a "deeply embedded sense of both narrative and lyric devotion". For Soapberry Review, Audrey Fong emphasized the collection's engagement with discomfort and pointed to its treatment of consumerism and citizenship. It was also included a Poetry Northwest book list, where it was described as attentive to "the daily colonialisms of names and silences" and to the relationship between work and home.
