= Carmen Giménez =

American poet, memoirist, editor, and publisher (born 1971)

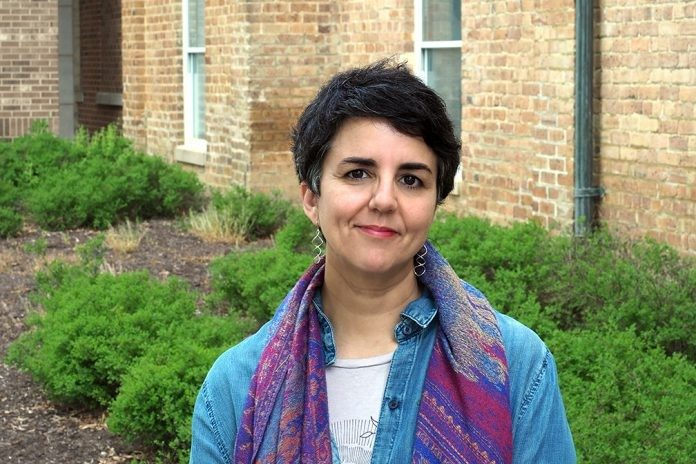
- Carmen Giménez at Virginia Tech
- Born: February 20, 1971 (age 55); New York City
- Education: San Jose State University; Iowa Writers' Workshop
- Occupations: Poet; memoirist; editor; publisher
- Writing career
- Language: English
- Genres: Poetry; memoir
- Notable works: Be Recorder; Bring Down the Little Birds
- Notable awards: Guggenheim Fellowship; Academy of American Poets Fellowship
- Website: carmengimenez.net

Carmen Giménez, formerly known as Carmen Giménez Smith, is an American poet, memoirist, editor, and publisher. She is the director and publisher of Graywolf Press, where she serves as executive director, and a former publisher of Noemi Press, which she led for twenty years. Her poetry collection Be Recorder was a finalist for the National Book Award for Poetry. She received a Guggenheim Fellowship in 2019 and the Academy of American Poets Fellowship in 2020.

== Life and career ==
Giménez was born on February 20, 1971, in New York City. She earned a BA from San Jose State University and an MFA from the Iowa Writers' Workshop.

Giménez taught at New Mexico State University and later was a professor of English at Virginia Tech. She has also taught at Bennington College.

In 2002, Giménez founded Noemi Press, the "historically brown and queer" independent literary press, and served as its publisher for twenty years. She is also a co-director of CantoMundo. In 2017, Giménez was named a poetry editor of The Nation, alongside Stephanie Burt. In 2022, Giménez became director and publisher of Graywolf Press. She serves as the press's executive director.

Giménez is the author of six poetry collections and a memoir. Her collection Milk and Filth was a finalist for the 2013 National Book Critics Circle Award in poetry. Be Recorder (2019) was a finalist for the National Book Award for Poetry, the PEN/Open Book Award, the Audre Lorde Award for Lesbian Poetry, and the Los Angeles Times Book Prize.

Her memoir, Bring Down the Little Birds, received an American Book Award. Her collection Goodbye, Flicker won the Juniper Prize for Poetry.

In 2009, Giménez was named one of the Poetry Society of America's New American Poets. She received a Howard Foundation fellowship in creative nonfiction in 2011, a Guggenheim Fellowship in 2019, and the Academy of American Poets Fellowship in 2020.

Many of Giménez's earlier books were published under the name Carmen Giménez Smith.

== Awards and honors ==
- 2009 Poetry Society of America New American Poets
- 2011 Howard Foundation fellowship in creative nonfiction
- 2011 American Book Award for Bring Down the Little Birds
- 2011 Juniper Prize for Poetry for Goodbye, Flicker
- 2013 National Book Critics Circle Award finalist in poetry for Milk and Filth
- 2019 Guggenheim Fellowship
- 2019 National Book Award for Poetry finalist for Be Recorder
- 2020 PEN/Open Book Award finalist for Be Recorder
- 2020 Audre Lorde Award for Lesbian Poetry finalist for Be Recorder
- 2020 Los Angeles Times Book Prize finalist for Be Recorder
- 2020 Academy of American Poets Fellowship

== Bibliography ==
=== Poetry collections ===
- Be Recorder (Minneapolis: Graywolf Press, 2019). ISBN 9781555978488
- Cruel Futures (San Francisco: City Lights, 2018). ISBN 9780872867581
- Milk and Filth (Tucson: University of Arizona Press, 2013). ISBN 9780816521166
- Goodbye, Flicker (Amherst: University of Massachusetts Press, 2012). ISBN 9781558499492
- The City She Was (Fort Collins: Center for Literary Publishing, 2011). ISBN 9781457111723
- Odalisque in Pieces (Tucson: University of Arizona Press, 2009). ISBN 9780816527885

=== Memoir ===
- Bring Down the Little Birds: On Mothering, Art, Work, and Everything Else (Tucson: University of Arizona Press, 2010). ISBN 9780816528691

=== Edited anthologies ===
- Angels of the Americlypse: New Latin@ Writing, edited with John Chávez (Denver: Counterpath, 2015).
- My Mother She Killed Me, My Father He Ate Me, edited with Kate Bernheimer (New York: Penguin, 2010).

=== Chapbooks ===
- Jokey Poems Up to Ten (Dusie Kollectiv, 2013)
- Can We Talk Here (New York: Belladonna Books, 2011)
- Reason's Monster (Note: A live Dusie PDF and a Half Letter Press page refer to the work as Reason's Monsters, suggesting the title may need verification.) (Dusie Kollectiv, 2011)
- Glitch (Dusie Kollectiv, c. 2010)
