= Radius of Arab American Writers =

Radius of Arab American Writers (the acronym RAWI means "storyteller" in Arabic) is an organization that provides mentoring, community, and support for Arab American writers and those with roots in the Arabic speaking world and the diaspora.

== History ==
RAWI was founded in 1992 by journalist and anthropologist Barbara Nimri Aziz. It began as a seven-person group of writers that met in Washington, D.C. RAWI has around 125 writers, artists, and journalists internationally.

== Programs ==
Every other year, RAWI puts on a conference for Arab American writers, artists, and scholars, which features readings, panels, workshops, and roundtables. The 2016 conference featured a panel discussing the challenges that Islamophobia and anti-Arab sentiment presented for Arab American writers. The June 2018 conference was in Houston, Texas, and featured panels and readings on Performing Images of the Body, an Artist Book Workshop, Queering Language, and readings featuring Marwa Helal, Randa Jarrar, Laila Lalami, Jess Rizkallah, and Zaina Alsous.

They advocated for the first Arab American Caucus at AWP.

RAWI cosponsors the Etel Adnan Poetry Prize, an award given for a first or second book of poetry in English by a poet of Arab heritage. Jess Rizkallah's the magic my body becomes was the inaugural winner, published in ` 2017.
