= Kate Bernheimer =

American fairy-tale writer, scholar and editor

- Education: Wesleyan University (BA) University of Arizona (MFA Creative Writing)
- Occupations: Writer; scholar; editor
- Writing career
- Genre: Fairy tale

Kate Bernheimer is an American fairy-tale writer, scholar and editor.

== Works ==
Kate Bernheimer's first three novels, a trilogy based on Russian, German, and Yiddish fairy tales, The Complete Tales of Ketzia Gold (2001), The Complete Tales of Merry Gold (2006), and The Complete Tales of Lucy Gold (2011), were published by Fiction Collective 2. Amongst her other work, her short-story collection Horse, Flower, Bird was published in the fall of 2010 by Coffee House Press. She edited the World Fantasy Award-winning collection of short stories, My Mother She Killed Me, My Father He Ate Me: Forty New Fairy Tales, which was published in the fall of 2010 by Penguin Books, and its sequel, xo Orpheus: Fifty New Myths, in 2013. She is also the author of The Girl in the Castle Inside the Museum, chosen as a best picture book of the year by Publishers Weekly in 2008. Her children's book The Lonely Book, illustrated by Chris Sheban and an Amazon "Best Books of the Month" selection for May 2012, was published in April 2012 by Random House Children's Books.

Bernheimer is founder and editor of the journal Fairy Tale Review, as well as a number of fairy-tale anthologies, including Mirror, Mirror on the Wall (Doubleday, 2002) and Brothers and Beasts (Wayne State University Press, 2007).

Bernheimer is the co-curator and co-editor (with her brother, architect Andrew Bernheimer) of Fairy Tale Architecture, published by Places Journal.

Bernheimer was also among a list of contributors to The &NOW Awards 2: The Best Innovative Writing which released in spring of 2013.

She has a BA from Wesleyan University.
