= Barbara Nimri Aziz =

American anthropologist

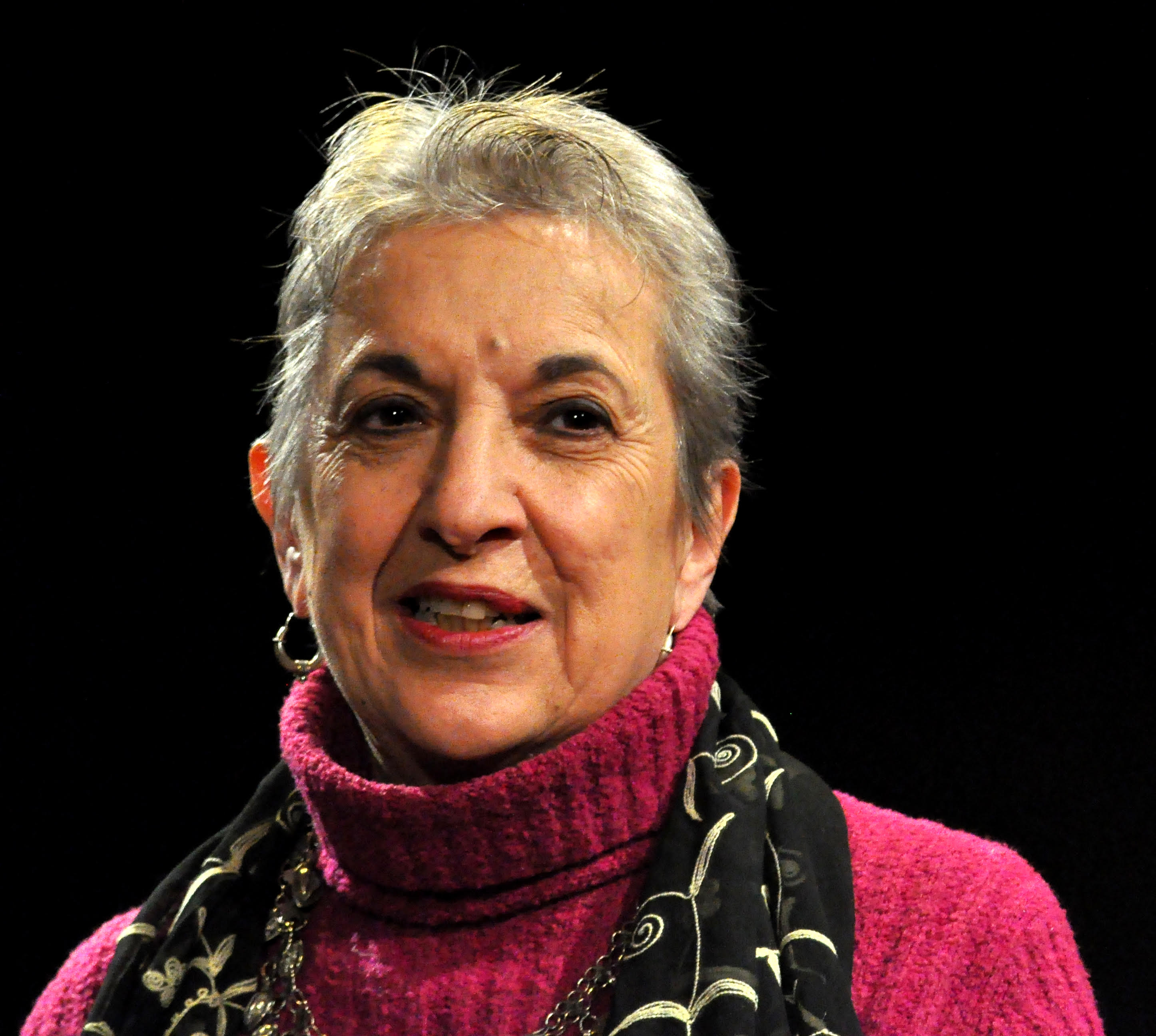
- Barbara Nimri Aziz (2013)
- Born: 1940 (age 85–86); Ontario, Canada
- Education: D Phil, SOAS University of London
- Occupations: Anthropologist, journalist, writer
- Website: https://barbaranimri.com/

Barbara Nimri Aziz (born 1940) is an anthropologist, journalist and writer based in New York City, US. She is best known for her anthropological research contributions to Tibetan and Himalayan Studies. She is prominently credited for her early work introducing and publicizing the career of the early 20th Century Nepali ascetic and political activist Yogmaya Neupane. Aziz is credited for leading the founding efforts for the establishment of the Arab American literary collective RAWI, where she also served as the director for 12 years.

== Early life ==
Aziz was born in a small town in Ontario, Canada to Arab immigrants who arrived in the country at the turn of the 20th century. At high school in Toronto, she grew up among other working class children whose families, like hers, formed a core of the city's slowly expanding immigrant population. She was one of students in her high school and the third member in her extended Arab family to attend university.

== Education and career ==
Graduating with a B.A. from Queen's University at Kingston in 1962, Aziz set out for Europe, with India as her ultimate destination. Following the annexation of Tibet by China in 1959, tens of thousands of Tibetan refugees were arriving in India at that time, and Aziz joined various humanitarian projects assisting them. She worked in a Tibetan nunnery for a year, then joined the British Save the Children Fund (UK)'s school for Tibetan children in Shimla, India and was employed as its headmistress for three years. Motivated to learn more about the history and culture of Asian people she decided to study anthropology and was offered a graduate position to work with the eminent ethnologist in Himalayan Studies, Christoph von Fürer-Haimendorf at the University of London's School of Oriental and African Studies (SOAS). With funding from SOAS for her doctoral research, Aziz travelled to Nepal in late 1969 and settled in Solukhumbu to conduct fieldwork among Tibetan refugees from Dingri, southwest Tibet. She remained there for more than a year, becoming a fluent Tibetan speaker. She was entrusted by Abbot Trulskik Rinpoche with photographing sacred Tibetan manuscripts connected with the 12th century teacher PhaDampa Sangyas and then worked with Bhutanese scholars to have them printed for wide distribution. In 1974 she was awarded her Doctor of Philosophy in Social anthropology. In 1978, her first book Tibetan Frontier Families: Reflections of Three Generations from Dingri was published (translated into Chinese in 1981). In 2011 a new edition was published, updated with information based on Aziz's subsequent research between 1985 and 1987 in Tibet itself.

In 1988, Aziz expanded her professional pursuits into journalism, joining WBAI Radio in New York City in 1989 and began covering the Arab Middle East on overseas assignments. Beginning in 1990 she added Arab affairs to her areas of expertise, devoting a decade reporting from Iraq about the global embargo against its people. Her written reports from Arab capitals appeared in multiple publications. Also at WBAI Radio she became executive producer and co-host of Radio Tahrir, a weekly program, while contributing as a political commentator. Her extensive print and radio interviews with Arab writers led to her founding the non-profit collective Radius of Arab American Writers Inc. in 1992, serving as its director from then until 2005.

In 2007, Aziz was awarded a one-year Fulbright Research Professorship to Algeria. She taught at the University of Oran in northwest Algeria while also traveling widely across many parts of the country.

=== Research on Yogmaya Neupane ===
In 1980 on a research exploration up the Arun River Valley in East Nepal, Aziz encountered a small settlement of women ascetics who disclosed to her the hitherto suppressed history of their departed guru from Bhojpur, the political agitator Yogmaya Neupane. Following this discovery, Aziz engaged in a sustained period of investigative research about this historical figure who had died forty years earlier. Interviewing elderly survivors of her movement and collecting oral and written documents, she was able to assemble a comprehensive picture of Neupane's long-suppressed political campaign in that region. Ultimately, her investigations led to the first biographical research on Yogmaya which was presented in 1990 at an international conference on Tibetan and Himalayan Studies, Zurich (and published in 1993). In 2001, Aziz published the book Heir to a Silent Song: Two Rebel Women of Nepal, that incorporated the biography of Yogmaya Neupane and her contemporary, the social activist Durga Devi Ghimire, also from Bhojpur.

== Selected works ==
- Aziz, Barbara Nimri (2011). Tibetan Frontier Families: Reflections of Three Generations from Dingri (Second (First ed., 1978) ed.). Kathmandu: Vajra Publishing House. ISBN 9789937506373.
- Soundings in Tibetan civilization : Seminar : Papers. Aziz, Barbara Nimri, Kapstein, Matthew, International Association for Tibetan Studies. New Delhi: Manohar. 1985. ISBN 81-85054-03-7. OCLC 497263285
- McEwen, Christian, ed. (1997). "Al-Dawwara". Jo's Girls: Tomboy Tales of High Adventure, True Grit, and Real Life. Beacon Press. ISBN 9780807062111.
- Aziz, Barbara Nimri. (2001). Heir to a silent song : two rebel women of Nepal. Nepāla ra Eśiyālī Anusandhāna Kendra. Kathmandu: Centre for Nepal and Asian Studies, Tribhuvan University. ISBN 99933-52-13-6. OCLC 50425151.
- Swimming Up the Tigris: Real Life Encounters with Iraq. University Press of Florida. 2007. ISBN 9780813031446.
- Yogmaya & Durga Devi: Rebel Women of Nepal, 2020.
