= My Mother She Killed Me, My Father He Ate Me =

2010 anthology of fantasy stories

- Paperback edition
- Author: edited by Kate Bernheimer and Carmen Giménez Smith
- Language: English
- Genre: Fantasy short stories
- Publisher: Penguin Books
- Publication date: September 28, 2010
- Publication place: United States
- Media type: Print (hardback)
- Pages: 608 pp
- ISBN: 978-0-14-311784-1
- OCLC: 515455953

My Mother She Killed Me, My Father He Ate Me: Forty New Fairy Tales is an anthology of fantasy stories based on the idea of fairy tales, edited by Kate Bernheimer and Carmen Giménez Smith. The book was published by Penguin Books on September 28, 2010. The anthology itself won the 2011 World Fantasy Award for Best Anthology.

== Contents ==
- Introduction (My Mother She Killed Me, My Father He Ate Me: Forty New Fairy Tales), by Kate Bernheimer
- Drawing the Curtain, by Gregory Maguire
- "Baba Iaga and the Pelican Child", by Joy Williams
- "Ardour", by Jonathon Keats
- "I'm Here", by Ludmilla Petrushevskaya
- "The Brother and the Bird", by Alissa Nutting
- "Hansel and Gretel", by Francine Prose
- "A Day in the Life of Half of Rumpelstiltskin", by Kevin Brockmeier
- "With Hair of Hand-Spun Gold", by Neil LaBute
- "The Swan Brothers", by Shelley Jackson
- "The Warm Mouth", by Joyelle McSweeney
- "Snow White, Rose Red", by Lydia Millet
- "The Erlking", by Sarah Shun-lien Bynum
- "Dapplegrim", by Brian Evenson
- "The Wild Swans", by Michael Cunningham
- "Halfway People", by Karen Joy Fowler
- "Green Air", by Rikki Ducornet
- "The Mermaid in the Tree", by Timothy Schaffert
- "What the Conch Shell Sings When the Body is Gone", by Katherine Vaz
- "The Snow Queen", by Karen Brennan
- "Eyes of Dogs", by Lucy Corin
- "Little Pot", by Ilya Kaminsky
- "A Bucket of Warm Spit", by Michael Martone
- "Catskin", by Kelly Link
- "Teague O'Kane and the Corpse", by Chris Adrian
- "Pleasure Boating in Lituya Bay", by Jim Shepard
- "Body-Without-Soul", by Kathryn Davis
- "The Girl, the Wolf, the Crone", by Kellie Wells
- "My Brother Gary Made a Movie and This is What Happened", by Sabrina Orah Mark
- "The Color Master", by Aimee Bender
- "The White Cat", by Marjorie Sandor
- "Blue-Bearded Lover", by Joyce Carol Oates
- "Bluebeard in Ireland", by John Updike
- "A Kiss to Wake the Sleeper", by Rabih Alameddine
- "A Case Study of Emergency Room Procedure and Risk Management by Hospital Staff Members in the Urban Facility", by Stacey Richter
- "Orange", by Neil Gaiman
- "Psyche's Dark Night", by Francesca Lia Block
- "The Story of the Mosquito", by Lily Hoang
- "First Day of Snow", by Naoko Awa
- "I Am Anjuhimeko", by Hiromi Ito
- "Coyote Takes Us Home", by Michael Mejia
- "Ever After", by Kim Addonizio
- "Whitework", by Kate Bernheimer
