= Jessica Abughattas =

American poet

- Born: California, U.S.
- Education: Pepperdine University; Antioch University
- Occupation: Poet
- Writing career
- Genre: Poetry
- Notable work: Strip
- Notable awards: Etel Adnan Poetry Prize (2020)
- Website: www.jessicaabughattas.com

Jessica Abughattas is a Palestinian American poet. Her debut poetry collection, Strip (2020), won the Etel Adnan Poetry Prize. From 2020 to 2022, she was the poet laureate of Altadena, California.

== Life and career ==
Abughattas was born and raised in California. She earned a BA in journalism from Pepperdine University and an MFA in poetry from Antioch University Los Angeles. From 2020 to 2022, she was the poet laureate of Altadena and edited the Altadena Poetry Review.

== Strip ==
Strip was published by University of Arkansas Press in 2020. It was selected for publication by Hayan Charara and Fady Joudah. In December 2020, Lit Hub republished the poem "Dinner Party" from Strip.

=== Reception ===
In Public Books, alongside books from Zaina Arafat and Adania Shibli, George Abraham wrote that Strip "resists explanation" and that its poems "never explain or justify their Palestinian-ness."

Reviewing the book for West Branch, Esteban Rodríguez wrote that the collection's "conversational yet deeply reflective tone" reveals "what wasn't known before".
