= Cindy Juyoung Ok =

American poet

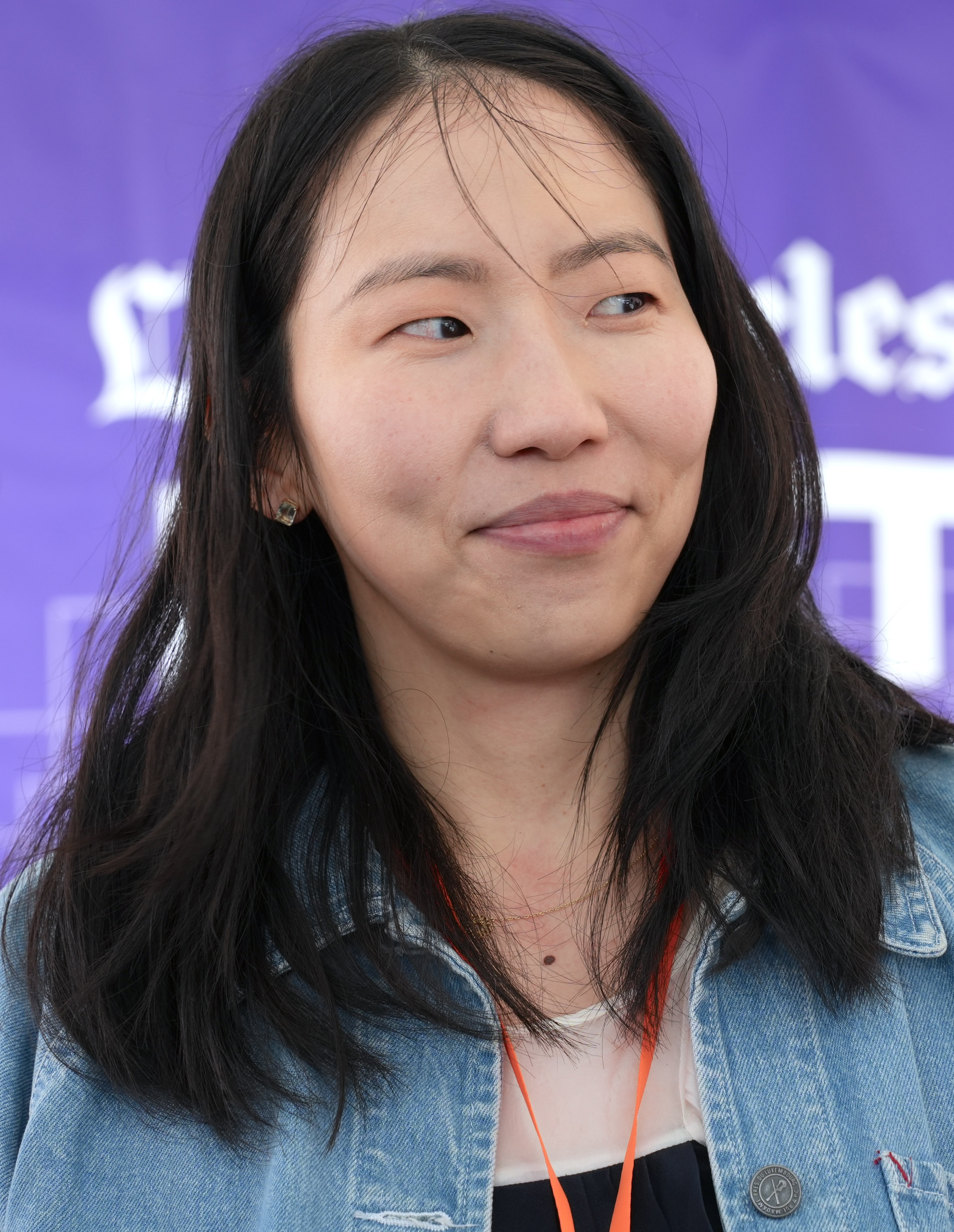
- Ok in 2025
- Citizenship: United States
- Occupations: Poet; translator; professor
- Employer: University of California, Davis
- Writing career
- Language: English
- Notable work: Ward Toward
- Notable awards: Yale Series of Younger Poets

Cindy Juyoung Ok is an American poet, translator, and professor. Her debut poetry collection, Ward Toward (Yale University Press, 2024), was selected for the Yale Series of Younger Poets. Her poems have appeared in Sewanee Review and NER, and her translations of Kim Hyesoon’s poetry have appeared in The Paris Review. She has taught at Wellesley College and Kenyon College and is a professor at the University of California, Davis.

== Career ==
Ok's poems have appeared in Poets.org, Sewanee Review, New England Review, Harvard Review, Iowa Review, and won a Forward Prize for Poetry. Her translations of Kim Hyesoon have appeared in The Paris Review, Hayden's Ferry Review, and Asymptote, and her translation of Kim's The Hell of That Star will be published by Wesleyan University Press in 2026.

Before becoming a teacher in creative writing, Ok taught science at a public school and additionally taught summer programs and coached debate teams. She also did "several new jobs" such as "rape crisis call center advocate ... standardized test item reviewer ... dissertation editing ... study subject ... commissioned translator ... creative writing instructor at various nonprofits" as well as "bartending, babysitting, and essay reviewing", among others. During the COVID-19 pandemic, she both attended and taught workshops in creative writing online.

In 2023, Ok's debut poetry collection, Ward Toward, was selected for the 2023 Yale Series of Younger Poets and subsequently published by Yale University Press in 2024. The book was recommended by Electric Literature and LitHub and given a starred review by Publishers Weekly. The book also won the poetry silver medal at the 94th California Book Awards in 2025. Ok embarked on a "joint book tour" alongside Diana Khoi Nguyen to promote it.

Ok was a Kenyon Review Fellow from 2023 to 2024, during which she taught at Kenyon College. She has also been a visiting lecturer in English at Wellesley College. In fall of 2024, Ok joined the English department at the University of California, Davis to teach both undergraduate and graduate courses in poetry.
