= Monica Ong =

American visual poet

Monica Ong also known as Monica Ong Reed is an Asian-American visual poet. She studied at the Rhode Island School of Design. In 2015 she created Silent Anatomies which received the Kore Press First Book Award. In the early 2020s Ong created Planetaria, a series of visual poems exhibited at the Poetry Foundation.

Her work has been published in Scientific American and Hyperallergic. Her work is in the collection of the National Museum of Women in the Arts.
