= Lehua Taitano =

CHamoru poet

Lehua M. Taitano
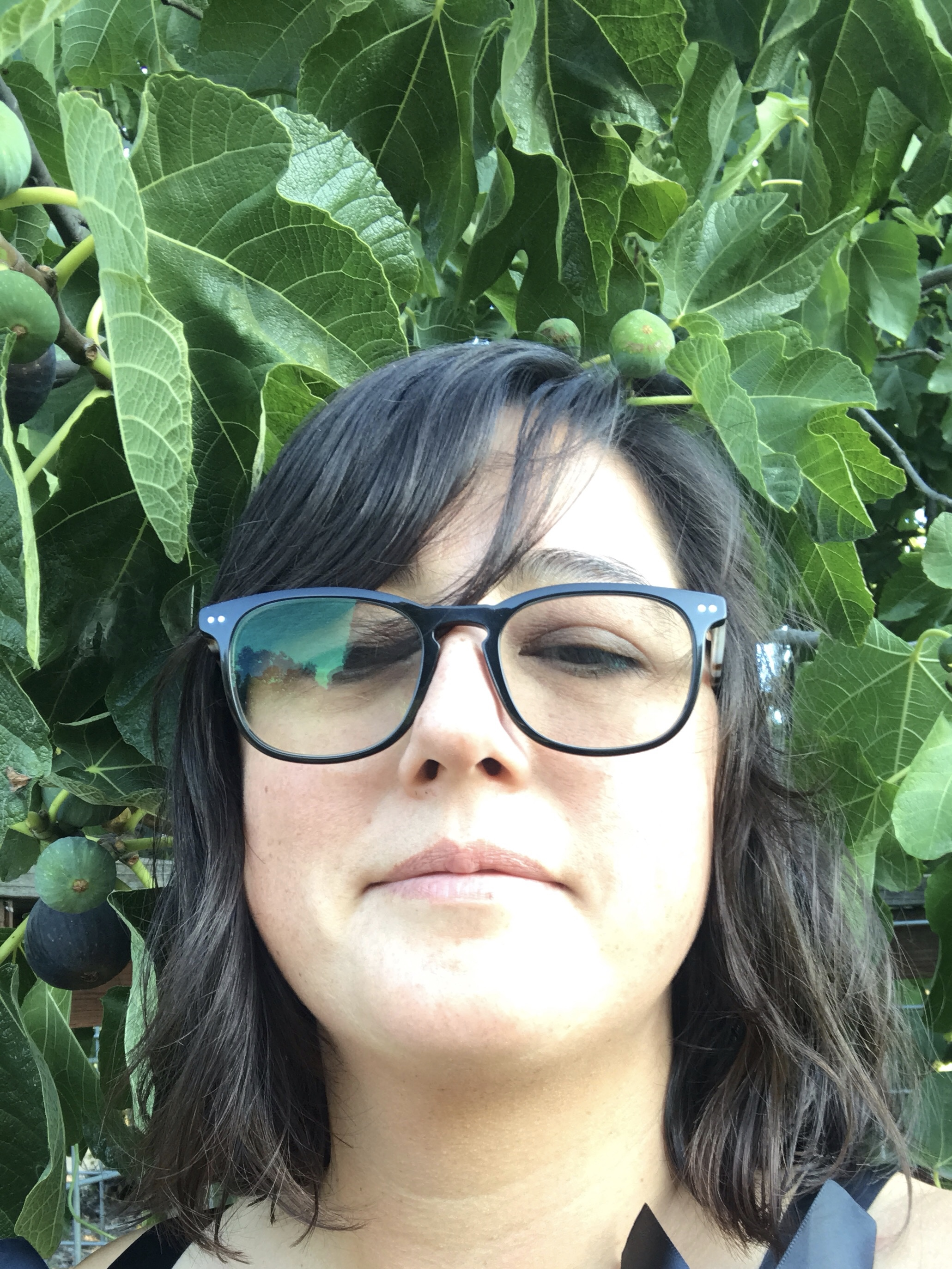
- Born: August 4, 1978 (age 48); Yigo, Guam
- Education: University of Montana
- Writing career
- Language: English
- Genres: Poetry, fiction, interdisciplinary art
- Website: www.lehuamtaitano.com

Lehua M. Taitano (born August 4, 1978) is a Chamoru poet, interdisciplinary artist, and educator. She is an indigenous person of the Mariana Islands, which are referred to as Laguås yan Gani in the Chamorro language.

== Early life and education ==
Taitano was born in Hagåtña, Guåhan Guam. She is an indigenous Chamoru (also spelled CHamoru and Chamorro) from the village of Yigu, and her family migrated to a small, rural town in the Appalachian Mountains of North Carolina when she was very young. She attended Appalachian State University as a North Carolina teaching fellow. She played on the women's varsity volleyball team and earned a bachelor's degree in English, with a focus on education. Taitano studied and taught martial arts classes (Shaolin Kung Fu and Tai Chi) before earning an MFA in fiction from the University of Montana.

== Career ==
Her work has appeared in World Literature Today, the Academy of American Poets series Poem a Day, Arc Poetry Magazine, Poetry (magazine), Fence, Tayo, Red Ink, Kartika Review, Hawai'i Review, Narrative Witness, Lit Hub, Witness, The Offending Adam, Platte Valley Review, Versal, dislocate, TinFish Journal, Nano Fiction, Storyboard, and A Transpacific Poetics.

Several of her poems have been translated into Swedish by the journal Kritiker.

Taitano has published two books of poetry: A Bell Made of Stones and Inside Me an Island and three chapbooks: appalachiapacific (winner of the H.G. Merriam Frontier Award), Sonoma, and Capacity, which is a digital chapbook of poetry and visual art.

Of A Bell Made of Stones, critics note that Taitano's poetry is among "a new wave of Chamorro and Pacific literature" that forces readers "to engage with the unsettling disconnection and stress of locating a coherent voice and a culturally legible identity/identities in the fragments of loss and daily misrecognitions created by distance, diaspora and resistance to performing so-called hetero-normativity,"

In a review of Inside Me an Island, Taitano's second full-length book, reviewer Julie Szews of Transmotion Literary Journal notes: "Translating the ever-flowing movement of the sea, Taitano expresses herself through the versatility of her poetry. In 17 poems Ma'te (Low Tide) explores memories of the sea and her siblings (Shore Song, Create a sibling...), visitations of ancestral spirits (A Night Crowded With Night), erasure and reconnection (Islanders waiting for Snow), patriotism and militarism (Spectator), encounters with racism (Banana Queen) and the feeling of displacement (Trespass). Likewise, Hafnot (High Tide) explores nature and landscape of the mainland United States (Enchanted Rock, Texas) as well as the indigenous stories that are connected to the land (One Kind of Hunger). Taitano's poems also explore emotional memories of grief (An Oiled Groove) and love (Estuary). With its queer female diasporic Chamoru voice, Lehua Taitano's latest poetry collection enriches the multiplicity of unique styles and voices of Chamorro poetry."

In 2019, Taitano co-founded the art collective Art 25: Art in the Twenty-fifth Century with artist Lisa Jarrett. She was interviewed about her poetry and Art 25 by the radio shows It's Lit!. and OutSources. Art 25's debut exhibit, Future Ancestors, features photography and installation in collaboration with special effects artist and poet Jocelyn Kapumealani Ng.

Since 2017, she served as the Community Outreach Director for the Thinking Its Presence: Race and Creative Writing Conference. Her interdisciplinary art installations and somatic poetry performances have been exhibited by the Smithsonian Institution and several galleries and universities.

== Personal life ==
Taitano currently lives in San Francisco, California.

== Selection works ==
=== Poetry ===
- A Bell Made of Stones. TinFish Press. 10 October 2013. ISBN 978-1-61932-033-8.
- Inside Me an Island. WordTech Editions. 15 June 2018. ISBN 978-1625492838.
- Capacity. Hawai'i Review e-Chapbook. 4 April 2018.
- Sonoma. Dropleaf Press Chapbook. 1 June 2017.

=== Fiction ===
- appalachiapacific. University of Montana Press Chapbook. 1 May 2011.

==== In Anthology ====
- Evelyn Flores and Emelihter Kihleng, ed. (2019). Indigenous Literatures from Micronesia. University of Hawai'i Press. ISBN 9780824875411.
- Nakayasu, Sawako; Samuels, Lisa, eds. (2017). A Transpacific Poetics. Litmus Press. ISBN 978-1-933959-32-0.

== Installation art and performance ==
- An Aberrational Poetics: Inside Me an Island Shaped W/hole, 'Ae Kai Culture Lab on Convergence, Smithsonian Asian Pacific American Center
- The Unburden Project, Urban x Indigenous, SOMArts
- Current, I, A Day in the Queer Life of Asian Pacific America, Smithsonian APAC
- Future Ancestors, Art 25: Art in the Twenty-fifth Century, Orí Gallery

== Awards and honors ==
- 2019 - Eliza So Fellowship
- 2019 - University of Arizona Poetry Center Residency recipient
- 2010 - Merriam Frontier Award Winner
