= Seema Yasmin =

British writer and medical doctor

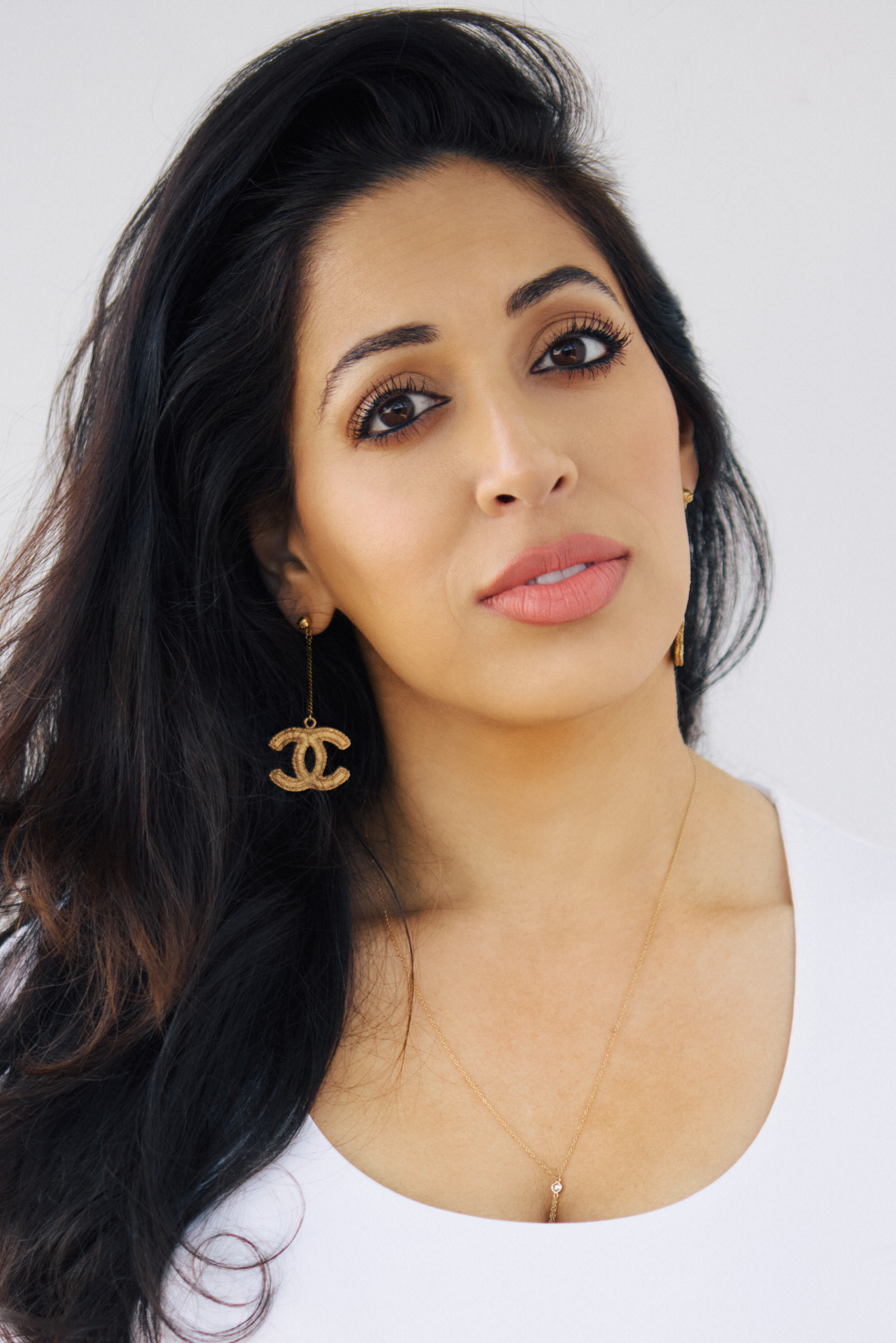
- Seema Yasmin
- Born: Nuneaton, Warwickshire, England
- Education: University of Cambridge; The University of Toronto; Queen Mary University of London
- Scientific career
- Workplaces: Stanford University; UCLA; The Dallas Morning News; University of Texas at Dallas; Centers for Disease Control and Prevention

Seema Yasmin is a British-American physician, writer and science communicator based at Stanford University. She is Director of Research and Education at the Stanford Health Communication Initiative. She is the author of 10 books. During the COVID-19 pandemic, Yasmin helped to debunk myths about the coronavirus.

== Education and early career ==
Yasmin was born in Nuneaton, Warwickshire, England and raised in London to a family of Indian and Burmese ancestry. Her mother, Yasmin Halima, was born in India and is a Distinguished Careers Institute fellow who works on women's health. At the age of seventeen, Yasmin decided that she wanted to take her mother's first name as her surname, and had her name changed with a lawyer. Yasmin trained in biochemistry at Queen Mary University of London and graduated in 2005. She moved to the University of Cambridge to complete a graduate programme in medicine. She started her medical career in the National Health Service, working at Homerton University Hospital for one year. In 2010 Yasmin was awarded a University of California, Los Angeles fellowship to train in clinical research in Botswana. She moved to the United States in 2010. In 2011, Yasmin joined the Epidemic Intelligence Service as a "disease detective" at the United States Centers for Disease Control and Prevention, where she studied outbreaks of disease in prisons, border towns and American Indian reservations. Whilst studying an outbreak of flesh-eating bacteria on the Navajo Nation, Yasmin realised the power of effective science communication, and realised that she wanted to use journalism to shift public policy.

== Career ==
In 2013 Yasmin was made a Dalla Lana Global Journalism Fellow at the University of Toronto. Here she focussed on telling the stories of epidemics in an effort to encourage others to learn from tragedy. Soon after completing her fellowship, Yasmin joined The Dallas Morning News as a reporter. Her work there included coverage of the Ebola crisis in Dallas and the epidemic of gun violence in the US. She was a medical analyst for CNN, and had a weekly medical segment on television news partner NBC 5 DFW. She held a simultaneous position as Professor of Public Health at the University of Texas at Dallas. Yasmin delivered the 2016 University of Texas at Austin McGovern Lecture, where she discussed the lessons she had learned reporting from public health emergencies.

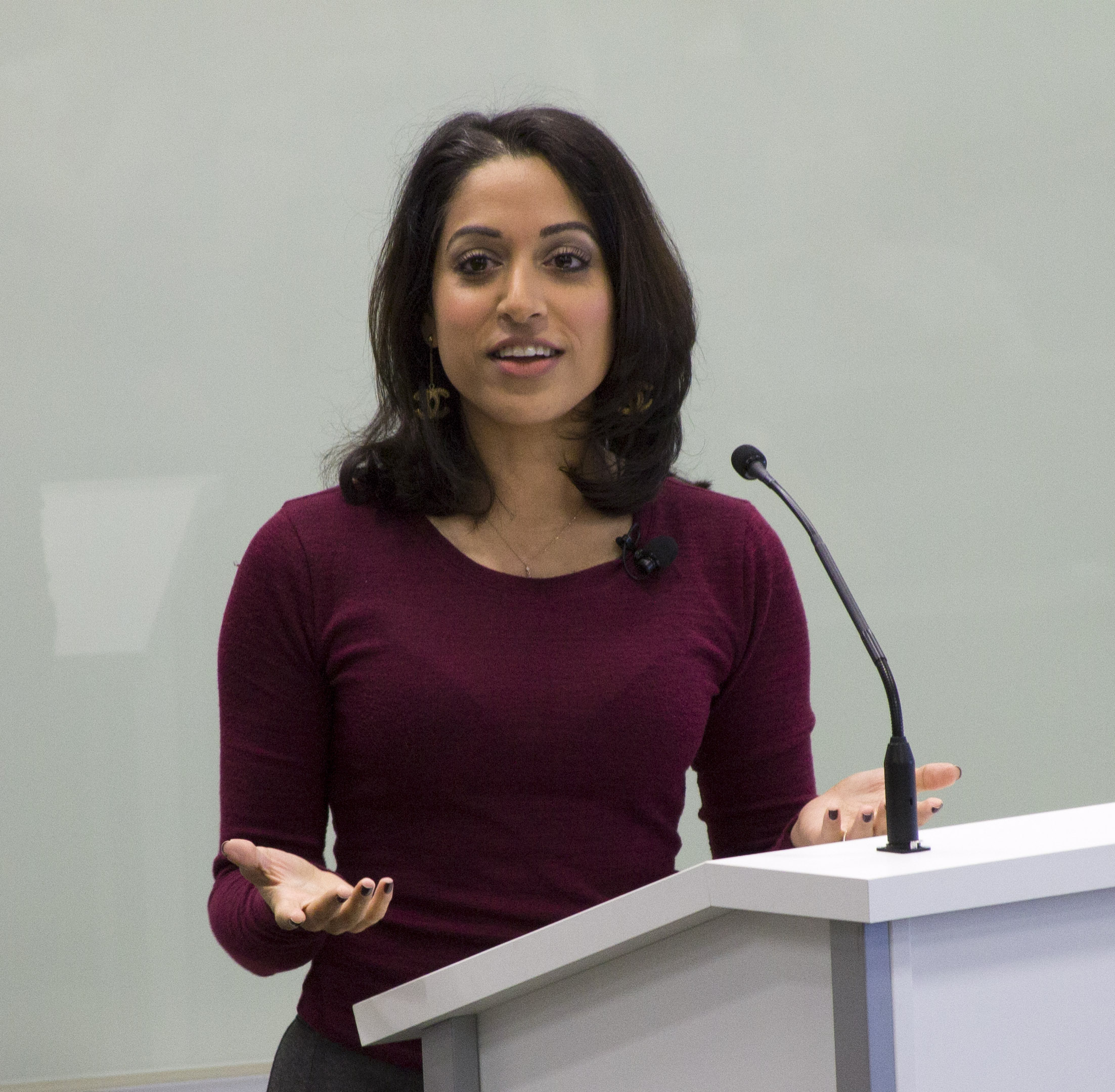
McGovern Lecture 2016

Yasmin joined Stanford University as a John S. Knight Fellow in 2017. There she investigated the spread of misinformation and pseudoscience during epidemics. As part of this fellowship, Yasmin started working with Wired to debunk pseudoscience and misinformation on YouTube. She delivered a talk at the TEDx OakLawn event in 2018. In 2019, Yasmin was appointed as Director of the Stanford University Health Communication Initiative.

During the COVID-19 pandemic, Yasmin used social media, podcasts, and popular science articles to better inform the public about the coronavirus disease. She is also interested in the "spread of myths and hoaxes and rumors and outright lies about vaccines". Yasmin became one of the most trusted public health experts on social media. She used webinars to teach students about how to report responsibly on medical emergencies. In an interview with Bumble, Yasmin explained how to date during the pandemic. A collection of her essays on health and medical misinformation from her newspaper column “Debunked” was published in 2021 as Viral BS : medical myths and why we fall for them.

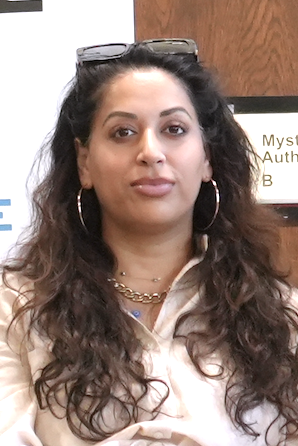
Yasmin in 2025

Her second book, Muslim Women Are Everything, started as a conversation on Twitter and ended as a six-figure book deal.

== Personal life ==
She is queer.

== Selected publications ==
=== Peer-reviewed scientific papers ===
- Ngugi, E. N.; Roth, E.; Mastin, Theresa; Nderitu, M. G.; Yasmin, Seema (1 September 2012). "Female sex workers in Africa: Epidemiology overview, data gaps, ways forward". SAHARA-J: Journal of Social Aspects of HIV/AIDS. 9 (3): 148–153. doi:10.1080/17290376.2012.743825. ISSN 1729-0376. PMC 4560463. PMID 23237069.
- Regan, Joanna J.; Traeger, Marc S.; Humpherys, Dwight; Mahoney, Dianna L.; Martinez, Michelle; Emerson, Ginny L.; Tack, Danielle M.; Geissler, Aimee; Yasmin, Seema; Lawson, Regina; Williams, Velda (1 June 2015). "Risk Factors for Fatal Outcome From Rocky Mountain Spotted Fever in a Highly Endemic Area—Arizona, 2002–2011". Clinical Infectious Diseases. 60 (11): 1659–1666. doi:10.1093/cid/civ116. ISSN 1058-4838. PMC 4706357. PMID 25697742.

=== Selected works ===
- The Impatient Dr. Lange: One Man's Fight to End the Global HIV Epidemic, ISBN 9781421426624 Joep Lange Institute (31 August 2018). "Seema Yasmin introduces her book The Impatient Dr. Lange". YouTube.
- Yasmin, Seema; Azim, Fahmida (2020). Muslim women are everything : stereotype-shattering stories of courage, inspiration, and adventure. Harper Collins. ISBN 978-0-06-294703-1. OCLC 1111254482.
- "From Liberia, Ebola Survivors Report They Are Still Afflicted with Disabling Symptoms". Scientific American.
- If God is a virus: poems. Haymarket Press. 2021. ISBN 9781642594591.
- Yasmin, Seema (2021). Viral BS : medical myths and why we fall for them. ISBN 978-1-4214-4040-8.
- Yasmin, Seema (2022). What the fact? (First ed.). New York. ISBN 978-1-6659-0003-4. OCLC 1344013866.

== Awards and honours ==
- 2016 University of North Texas Mayborn Award for Literary Non-Fiction
- 2016 won an Emmy Award for her documentary Hidden Threat: The Kissing Bug and Chagas Disease
- 2017 John S. Knight Fellow in Journalism.
- 2017 Pulitzer Prize Finalist.
