= Diana Khoi Nguyen =

American poet

- Born: Los Angeles, California, U.S.
- Education: Columbia University (MFA)
- Occupations: Poet, multimedia artist
- Employer: University of Pittsburgh
- Writing career
- Language: English
- Notable works: Ghost Of; Root Fractures
- Notable awards: National Book Award for Poetry (finalist, 2018)

Diana Khoi Nguyen is an American poet and multimedia artist. Her first book, Ghost Of, was a finalist for The 2018 National Book Award for Poetry. She is currently an assistant professor at the University of Pittsburgh. Her second book, Root Fractures, was released in 2024.

== Life ==
Nguyen was born and raised in Los Angeles, and received her MFA from Columbia University. She currently lives in Pittsburgh, where she is an assistant professor in Creative Writing at the University of Pittsburgh.

She won the 92Y's Discovery / Boston Review 2017 Poetry Contest and the Omnidawn Open Book Contest. She has received the Academy of American Poets University Prize, as well as awards and scholarships from Key West Literary Seminars, Bread Loaf Writers Conference, Provincetown Fine Arts Work Center, Community of Writers at Squaw Valley, and Bucknell University. She is a Kundiman fellow.

== Ghost Of ==
Ghost Of was a finalist for The National Book Award in Poetry in 2018. In the foreword, Terrance Hayes called it a collection of “exile and elegy.”

Nguyen says Ghost Of was written for everyone affected by the Vietnam War, including her family and her brother Oliver, who took his own life in 2014. "Ghost Of seeks to understand his death, familial, transnational, and intergenerational trauma—all the silences and secrets. It is a radical eulogy for and to Oliver, because I wish I could still converse with my brother," Nguyen said in Literary Hub in 2018.

Nguyen says she likes to write in intense 15-day bursts throughout the year, and that Ghost Of was written over just 30 days in 2016.

Publishers' Weekly said of Ghost Of: "Though devastating, Nguyen’s impressive lyrico-visual rendering details survival despite overwhelming tragedy." The Kenyon Review said: "Nguyen’s book feels populated not so much by 'experimental' poetry as by poetry that is shaped by suffering; the poems are the exact shape they have to be to accommodate, and attempt to bear, the weight of tragedy...One of the most compelling aspects about this elegy is the dispensation of melodrama that so often accompanies great pain. Nguyen’s book is a bare recounting of the experience of grief more than the circumstances that led to it. It reads like cartography, with the speaker mapping a territory that keeps reshaping itself. The poems are not attempts toward healing so much as attempts to be rigorously honest about the experience of trying to heal but failing, thinking one is healed only for the wound again to start oozing." Booklist said in a review: "Haunting, incisive, and exceptionally spare, Nguyen’s shape-shifting poems confront death, displacement, and the emptiness within and around us."
