= Thom Gunn Award =

Annual literary award for gay poetry

- Awarded for: Gay male poetry
- Sponsored by: Publishing Triangle
- Reward: US$1,000
- Established: 2001
- Most wins: Richard Siken (2)
- Website: http://www.publishingtriangle.org

The Thom Gunn Award for Gay Poetry is an annual literary award presented by Publishing Triangle to honour works of gay male poetry. First presented in 2001 as the Triangle Award for Gay Poetry, the award was renamed in memory of British poet Thom Gunn, the award's first winner, following his death in 2004.

== Recipients ==
Award winners and finalists
Year	Author	Title	Publisher	Result	Ref.
2001	Thom Gunn	Boss Cupid	Farrar, Straus and Giroux	Winner	
2001	Carl Phillips	Pastoral	Graywolf Press	Finalist	
2001	Griffin Hansbury	Day for Night	Painted Leaf Press	Finalist	
2002	Mark Doty	Source	HarperCollins	Winner	
2002	Billeh Nickerson	The Asthmatic Glassblower	Arsenal Pulp Press	Finalist	
2002	Justin Chin	Harmless Medicine	Manic D Press	Finalist	
2003	Greg Hewett	Red Suburb	Coffee House Press	Winner	
2003	David Groff	Theory of Devolution	University of Illinois Press	Finalist	
2003	Rafael Campo	Landscape with Human Figure	Duke University Press	Finalist	
2004	Brian Teare	The Room Where I Was Born	University of Wisconsin Press	Winner	
2004	Patrick Donnelly	The Change	Ausable Press	Finalist	
2004	Peter Pereira	Saying the World	Copper Canyon Press	Finalist	
2005	Carl Phillips	The Rest of Love	Farrar, Straus and Giroux	Winner	
2005	D. A. Powell	Cocktails	Graywolf Press	Finalist	
2005	Ron Mohring	Survivable World	Word Works	Finalist	
2006	Richard Siken	Crush	Yale University Press	Winner	
2006	Frank Bidart	Star Dust	Farrar, Straus and Giroux	Finalist	
2006	Peter Covino	Cut Off the Ears of Winter	New Issues	Finalist	
2007	Justin Chin	Gutted	Manic D Press	Winner	
2007	Greg Hewett	The Eros Conspiracy	Coffee House Press	Finalist	
2007	Jim Elledge	A History of My Tattoo	Stonewall	Finalist	
2008	Daniel Hall	Under Sleep	University of Chicago Press	Winner	
2008	Steve Fellner	Blind Date with Cafavy	Marsh Hawk Press	Winner	
2008	Henri Cole	Blackbird and Wolf	Farrar, Straus and Giroux	Finalist	
2009	Ely Shipley	Boy with Flowers	Barrow Street Press	Winner	
2009	Jericho Brown	Please	New Issues	Finalist	
2009	Mark Doty	Fire to Fire	Harper/HarperCollins	Finalist	
2010	Ronaldo V. Wilson	Poems of the Black Object	Futurepoem Books	Winner	
2010	Brent Goodman	The Brother Swimming Beneath Me	Black Lawrence Press	Finalist	
2010	D. A. Powell	Chronic	Graywolf Press	Finalist	
2011	Michael Walsh	The Dirt Riddles	University of Arkansas Press	Winner	
2011	Eric Leigh	Harm's Way	University of Arkansas Press	Finalist	
2011	Paul Legault	The Madeleine Poems	Omnidawn	Finalist	
2012	Henri Cole	Touch	Farrar, Straus and Giroux	Winner	
2012	Brad Richard	Motion Studies	The Word Works	Finalist	
2012	Christopher Hennessy	Love-in-Idleness	Brooklyn Arts Press	Finalist	
2012	Tim Dlugos	A Fast Life: The Collected Poems of Tim Dlugos	Nightboat Books	Finalist	
2013	Richard Blanco	Looking for the Gulf Motel	University of Pittsburgh Press	Winner	
2013	Aaron Smith	Appetite	University of Pittsburgh Press	Finalist	
2013	Eduardo C. Corral	Slow Lightning	Yale University Press	Finalist	
2013	Stephen S. Mills	He Do the Gay Man in Different Voices	Sibling Rivalry Press	Finalist	
2014	Charlie Bondhus	All the Heat We Could Carry	Main Street Rag	Winner	
2014	L. Lamar Wilson	Sacrilegion	Carolina Wren Press	Finalist	
2014	Michael Klein	The Talking Day	Sibling Rivalry Press	Finalist	
2014	Rigoberto González	Unpeopled Eden	Four Way Books	Finalist	
2015	Jericho Brown	The New Testament	Copper Canyon Press	Winner	
2015	Pier Paolo Pasolini; edited and trans. by Stephen Sartarelli	The Selected Poetry of Pier Paolo Pasolini: A Bilingual Edition	University of Chicago Press	Finalist	
2015	Roberto Montes	I Don't Know Do You	Ampersand Books	Finalist	
2015	Saeed Jones	Prelude to Bruise	Coffee House Press	Finalist	
2016	Rick Barot	Chord	Sarabande Books	Winner	
2016	Oliver Bendorf	The Spectral Wilderness	Kent State University Press	Finalist	
2016	Rickey Laurentiis	Boy with Thorn	University of Pittsburgh Press	Finalist	
2016	Ronaldo V. Wilson	Farther Traveler	Counterpath Press	Finalist	
2017	Ocean Vuong	Night Sky with Exit Wounds	Copper Canyon Press	Winner	
2017	Derrick Austin	Trouble the Water	BOA Editions	Finalist	
2017	Phillip B. Williams	Thief in the Interior	Alice James Books	Finalist	
2017	Sjohnna McCray	Rapture	Graywolf Press	Finalist	
2018	Chen Chen	When I Grow Up I Want to Be a List of Further Possibilities	BOA Editions	Winner	
2018	Charif Shanahan	Into Each Room We Enter Without Knowing	Southern Illinois University Press	Finalist	
2018	Danez Smith	Don't Call Us Dead	Graywolf Press	Finalist	
2018	Frank Bidart	Half-Light: Collected Poems, 1965–2016	Farrar, Straus and Giroux	Finalist	
2019	Hieu Minh Nguyen	Not Here	Coffee House Press	Winner	
2019	Blas Falconer	Forgive the Body This Failure	Four Way Books	Finalist	
2019	Marcelo Hernandez Castillo	Cenzontle	BOA Editions	Finalist	
2019	Timothy Liu	Luminous Debris: New and Selected Legerdemain, 1992–2017	Barrow Street Press	Finalist	
2020	Sam Ross	Company	Four Way Books	Winner	
2020	Aaron Smith	The Book of Daniel	University of Pittsburgh Press	Finalist	
2020	Angelo Nestore; trans. by Lawrence Schimel	Impure Acts	Indolent Books	Finalist	
2020	Jan-Henry Gray	Documents	BOA Editions	Finalist	
2021	Mark Bibbins	13th Balloon	Copper Canyon Press	Winner	
2021	Danez Smith	Homie	Graywolf Press	Finalist	
2021	Jameson Fitzpatrick	Pricks in the Tapestry	Birds, LLC	Finalist	
2021	Tommye Blount	Fantasia for the Man in Blue	Four Way Books	Finalist	
2022	John Keene	Punks: New & Selected Poems	The Song Cave	Winner	
2022	Kevin Simmonds	The Monster I Am Today: Leontyne Price and a Life in Verse	Northwestern University Press	Finalist	
2022	Miguel Murphy	Shoreditch	Barrow Street Press	Finalist	
2022	Phillip B. Williams	Mutiny	Penguin Books	Finalist	
2023	Philip Clark and Michael Bronski (ed.)	Invisible History: The Collected Poems of Walta Borawski	Rebel Satori Press	Winner	
2023	Eric Tran	Mouth, Sugar and Smoke	Diode Editions	Finalist	
2023	Gabriel Ojeda-Sagué	Madness	Nightboat Books	Finalist	
2023	Saeed Jones	Alive at the End of the World	Coffee House Press	Finalist	
2024	Charif Shanahan	Trace Evidence	Tin House	Winner	
2024	Sam Sax	Pig	Scribner	Finalist	
2024	Brian Teare	Poem Bitten by a Man	Nightboat Books	Finalist	
2024	Rigoberto González	To the Boy Who Was Night	Four Way Books	Finalist	
2025	Blas Falconer	Rara Avis	Four Way Books	Winner	
2025	Jubi Arriola-Headley	Bound	Persea Books	Finalist	
2025	Joshua Garcia	Pentimento	Black Lawrence Press	Finalist	
2025	Kevin McLellan	Sky. Pond. Mouth.	Yas Press	Finalist	
2026	Richard Siken	I Do Know Some Things	Copper Canyon Press	Winner	
2026	Bryan Borland	Brotherful	Sibling Rivalry Press	Finalist	
2026	C. Dale Young	Building the Perfect Animal: New and Selected Poems	Four Way Books	Finalist	
2026	Rajiv Mohabir	Seabeast	Four Way Books	Finalist	
2026	Patrick Donnelly	Willow Hammer	Four Way Books	Finalist	

== See also ==
- Lambda Literary Award for Gay Poetry
