= National Book Critics Circle Award for Poetry =

Annual American literary award

- Awarded for: "the finest books and reviews published in English"
- Sponsored by: National Book Critics Circle
- First award: 1975
- Website: https://www.bookcritics.org/awards

The National Book Critics Circle Award for Poetry, established in 1975, is an annual American literary award presented by the National Book Critics Circle (NBCC) to promote "the finest books and reviews published in English". Awards are presented annually to books published in the U.S. during the preceding calendar year in six categories: Fiction, Nonfiction, Poetry, Memoir/Autobiography, Biography, and Criticism.

Books previously published in English are not eligible, such as re-issues and paperback editions. They do consider "translations, short story and essay collections, self-published books, and any titles that fall under the general categories".

The judges are the volunteer directors of the NBCC, who are 24 members serving rotating three-year terms, with eight elected annually by the voting members, namely "professional book review editors and book reviewers". Winners of the awards are announced each year at the NBCC awards ceremony in conjunction with the yearly membership meeting, which takes place in March.

== Recipients ==
National Book Critics Circle Award for Poetry winners and finalists
Year	Author	Title	Result	Ref.
1975	John Ashbery	Self-portrait in a Convex Mirror	Winner	
1976	Elizabeth Bishop	Geography III	Winner	
	Philip Levine	The Names of the Lost		
	Muriel Rukeyser	The Gates		
	Louis Simpson	Searching for the Ox		
	Richard Wilbur	The Mind-Reader		
1977	Robert Lowell	Day by Day	Winner	
	John Ashbery	Houseboat Days		
	Stanley Plumly	Out-of-the-Body Travel		
	W.D. Snodgrass	The Fuhrer Bunker: A Cycle of Poems in Progress		
	Gerald Stern	Lucky Life		
1978	L. E. Sissman	Hello, Darkness: The Collected Poems of L. E. Sissman	Winner	
	Adrienne Rich	The Dream of a Common Language: Poems, 1974-1977		
	Mark Strand	The Late Hour		
	May Swenson	New & Selected Things Taking Place		
	John Hollander	Spectral Emanations: New and Selected Poems		
1979	Philip Levine	Ashes: Poems New and Old and 7 Years From Somewhere	Winner	
	Anthony Hecht	The Venetian Vespers		
	John Hollander	Blue Wine and Other Poems		
	David Smith	Goshawk, Antelope		
	Howard Moss	Notes From the Castle		
1980	Frederick Seidel	Sunrise	Winner	
	Joseph Brodsky	A Part of Speech		
	Robert Penn Warren	Being Here: Poetry, 1977-1980		
	James Schuyler	The Morning of the Poem		
	James Merrill	Scripts for the Pageant		
1981	A.R. Ammons	A Coast of Trees	Winner	
	Douglas Crase	The Revisionist		
	Daniel Hoffman	Brotherly Love		
	Donald Finkel	What Manner of Beast		
	Edward Hirsch	The Sleepwalkers		
1982	Katha Pollitt	Antarctic Traveler	Winner	
	Jack Gilbert	Monoliths: Poems, 1962 and 1982		
	Brad Leithauser	Hundreds of Fireflies		
	Phyllis Janowitz	Visiting Rites		
	W.S. Merwin	Finding the Islands		
1983	James Merrill	The Changing Light at Sandover	Winner	
	Jorie Graham	Erosion		
	Amy Clampitt	The Kingfisher		
	Cathy Song	Picture Bride		
	C.K. Williams	Tar		
1984	Sharon Olds	The Dead and the Living	Winner	
	Robert Duncan	Ground Work: Before the War		
	Charles Wright	The Other Side of the River		
	Dick Allen	Overnight in the Guest House of the Mystic		
	John Ashbery	A Wave		
1985	Louise Glück	The Triumph of Achilles	Winner	
	Amy Clampitt	What the Light Was Like		
	Gjertude Schnackenberg	The Lamplit Answer		
	Galway Kinnell	The Past		
	James Merrill	Late Settings		
1986	Edward Hirsch	Wild Gratitude	Winner	
	Irving Feldman	All of Us Here and Other Poems		
	Brad Leithauser	Cats of the Temple		
	Timothy Steele	Sapphics Against Anger		
	Anne Winters	The Key to the City		
1987	C.K. Williams	Flesh and Blood	Winner	
	John Ashbery	April Galleons		
	Alan Shapiro	Happy Hour		
	May Swenson	In Other Words		
	Donald Justice	The Sunset Maker		
1988	Donald Hall	The One Day	Winner	
	Richard Wilbur	New and Collected Poems		
	John Hollander	Harp Lake		
	Kenneth Koch	One Thousand Avant-Garde Plays		
	Thomas McGrath	Selected Poems, 1938-1988		
1989	Rodney Jones	Transparent Gestures	Winner	
	August Kleinzahler	Earthquake Weather		
	Robert Hass	Human Wishes		
	Thylias Moss	Pyramid of Bone		
	Nancy Willard	Water Walker		
1990	Amy Gerstler	Bitter Angel	Winner	
1990	Frank Bidart	In the Western Night	Finalist	
1990	John Haines	New Poems, 1980-88	Finalist	
1990	Anthony Hecht	The Transparent Man	Finalist	
1990	Charles Simic	The Book of Gods and Devils	Finalist	
1991	Albert Goldbarth	Heaven and Earth: A Cosmology	Winner	
1991	Diane Ackerman	Jaguar of Sweet Laughter: New & Selected Poems	Finalist	
1991	Allen Grossman	The Ether Dome and Other Poems: New & Selected (1979-1991)	Finalist	
1991	Philip Levine	What Work Is	Finalist	
1991	Adrienne Rich	An Atlas of the Difficult World	Finalist	
1992	Hayden Carruth	Collected Shorter Poems 1946–1991	Winner	
1992	David Ferry	Gilgamesh	Finalist	
1992	Maxine Kumin	Looking for Luck	Finalist	
1992	Sharon Olds	The Father	Finalist	
1992	K.C. Williams	A Dream of Mine	Finalist	
1993	Mark Doty	My Alexandria	Winner	
1993	Donald Hall	The Museum of Clear Ideas	Finalist	
1993	Linda Hogan	The Book of Medicines	Finalist	
1993	Audre Lorde	The Marvelous Arithmetic of Distance	Finalist	
1993	Jack Marshall	Sesame	Finalist	
1994	Mark Rudman	Rider	Winner	
1994	Dorianne Laux	What We Carry	Finalist	
1994	Marilyn Hacker	Winter Numbers	Finalist	
1994	Philip Levine	The Simple Truth	Finalist	
1994	Mary Jo Salter	Sunday Skaters	Finalist	
1995	William Matthews	Time and Money	Winner	
1995	Lynda Hull	The Only World	Finalist	
1995	James Merrill	A Scattering of Salts	Finalist	
1995	Carl Phillips	Cortege	Finalist	
1995	Ellen Bryant Voigt	Kyrie	Finalist	
1996	Robert Hass	Sun Under Wood	Winner	
1996	Stephen Dunn	Loosestrife	Finalist	
1996	Martín Espada	Imagine the Angels of Bread	Finalist	
1996	Jane Shore	Music Minus One	Finalist	
1996	C.K. Williams	The Vigil	Finalist	
1997	Charles Wright	Black Zodiac	Winner	
1997	Frank Bidart	Desire	Finalist	
1997	Brenda Hillman	Loose Sugar	Finalist	
1997	Mark Jarman	Questions for Ecclesiastes	Finalist	
1997	Sonya Sanchez	Does Your House Have Lions?	Finalist	
1998	Marie Ponsot	The Bird Catcher	Winner	
1998	Pamela White Hadas	Self-Evidence	Finalist	
1998	Thylias Moss	Last Chance for the Tarzan Holler	Finalist	
1998	Anne Carson	The Autobiography of Red: A Novel in Verse	Finalist	
1998	Yusef Komunyakaa	Thieves of Paradise	Finalist	
1999	Ruth Stone	Ordinary Words	Winner	
1999	Rafael Campo	Diva	Finalist	
1999	Tory Dent	HIV, Mon Amour	Finalist	
1999	Rita Dove	On the Bus With Rosa Parks	Finalist	
1999	Susan Kingsolving	Dailies & Rushes	Finalist	
2000	Judy Jordan	Carolina Ghost Woods	Winner	
2000	Michael Collier	The Ledge	Finalist	
2000	Anne Carson	Men in the Off Hours	Finalist	
2000	Yusef Komunyakaa	Talking Dirty to the Gods	Finalist	
2000	Davis McCombs	Ultima Thule	Finalist	
2001	Albert Goldbarth	Saving Lives	Winner	
2001	Louise Gluck	The Seven Ages	Finalist	
2001	Bob Hicok	Animal Soul	Finalist	
2001	Jane Hirshfield	Given Sugar, Given Salt	Finalist	
2001	Czeslaw Milosz	A Treatise on Poetry	Finalist	
2002	B.H. Fairchild	Early Occult Memory Systems of the Lower Midwest	Winner	
2002	Major Jackson	Leaving Saturn	Finalist	
2002	Harryette Mullen	Sleeping With the Dictionary	Finalist	
2002	Sharon Olds	The Unswept Room	Finalist	
2002	Adam Zagajewski	Without End: New and Selected Poems	Finalist	
2003	Susan Stewart	Columbarium	Winner	
2003	Carolyn Forche	Blue Hour	Finalist	
2003	Tony Hoagland	What Narcissism Means to Me	Finalist	
2003	Venus Khoury-Ghata	She Says	Finalist	
2003	Mary Szybist, tr. Marilyn Hacker	Granted	Finalist	
2004	Adrienne Rich	The School Among the Ruins	Winner	
2004	Brigit Pegeen Kelly	The Orchard	Finalist	
2004	D.A. Powell	Cocktails	Finalist	
2004	James Richardson	Interglacial	Finalist	
2004	Gary Snyder	Danger on Peaks	Finalist	
2005	Jack Gilbert	Refusing Heaven	Winner	
2005	Simon Armitage	The Shout	Finalist	
2005	Blas Manuel de Luna	Bent to the Earth	Finalist	
2005	Richard Siken	Crush	Finalist	
2005	Ron Slate	The Incentive of the Maggot	Finalist	
2006	Troy Jollimore	Tom Thomson in Purgatory	Winner	
2006	Daisy Fried	My Brother is Getting Arrested Again	Finalist	
2006	Miltos Sachtouris	Poems (1945-1971)	Finalist	
2006	Frederick Seidel	Ooga-Booga	Finalist	
2006	W.D. Snodgrass	Not for Specialists: New and Selected Poems	Finalist	
2007	Mary Jo Bang	Elegy	Winner	
2007	Matthea Harvey	Modern Life	Finalist	
2007	Tadeusz Rózewicz	New Poems	Finalist	
2007	Michael O'Brien	Sleeping and Waking	Finalist	
2007	Tom Pickard	The Ballad of Jamie Allan	Finalist	
2008	Juan Felipe Herrera	Half the World in Light	Winner (tie)	
2008	August Kleinzahler	Sleeping it Off in Rapid City	Winner (tie)	
2008	Brenda Shaughnessy	Human Dark with Sugar	Finalist	
2008	Devin Johnston	Sources	Finalist	
2008	Pierre Martory with John Ashbery (trans.)	The Landscapist	Finalist	
2009	Rae Armantrout	Versed	Winner	
2009	Louise Glück	A Village Life	Finalist	
2009	Eleanor Ross Taylor	Captive Voices: New and Selected Poems, 1960–2008	Finalist	
2009	D. A. Powell	Chronic	Finalist	
2009	Rachel Zucker	Museum of Accidents	Finalist	
2010	C.D. Wright	One With Others	Winner	
2010	Terrance Hayes	Lighthead	Finalist	
2010	Anne Carson	Nox	Finalist	
2010	Kay Ryan	The Best of It	Finalist	
2010	Kathleen Graber	The Eternal City	Finalist	
2011	Laura Kasischke	Space, In Chains	Winner	
2011	Forrest Gander	Core Samples from the World	Finalist	
2011	Bruce Smith	Devotions	Finalist	
2011	Aracelis Girmay	Kingdom Animalia	Finalist	
2011	Yusef Komunyakaa	The Chameleon Couch	Finalist	
2012	D. A. Powell	Useless Landscape, or A Guide for Boys	Winner	
2012	David Ferry	Bewilderment: New Poems and Translations	Finalist	
2012	Allan Peterson	Fragile Acts	Finalist	
2012	A. E. Stallings	Olives	Finalist	
2012	Lucia Perillo	On the Spectrum of Possible Deaths	Finalist	
2013	Frank Bidart	Metaphysical Dog	Winner	
2013	Denise Duhamel	Blowout	Finalist	
2013	Bob Hicok	Elegy Owed	Finalist	
2013	Carmen Gimenez Smith	Milk and Filth	Finalist	
2013	Lucie Brock-Broido	Stay, Illusion	Finalist	
2014	Claudia Rankine	Citizen: An American Lyric	Winner	
2014	Jake Adam York	Abide	Finalist	
2014	Christian Wiman	Once in the West	Finalist	
2014	Saeed Jones	Prelude to Bruise	Finalist	
2014	Willie Perdomo	The Essential Hits of Shorty Bon Bon	Finalist	
2015	Ross Gay	Catalogue of Unabashed Gratitude	Winner	
2015	Ada Limón	Bright Dead Things	Finalist	
2015	Terrance Hayes	How to Be Drawn	Finalist	
2015	Sinéad Morrissey	Parallax: And Selected Poems	Finalist	
2015	Frank Stanford	What About This: Collected Poems of Frank Stanford	Finalist	
2016	Ishion Hutchinson	House of Lords and Commons	Winner	
2016	Robert Pinsky	At the Foundling Hospital	Finalist	
2016	Monica Youn	Blackacre	Finalist	
2016	Tyehimba Jess	Olio	Finalist	
2016	Bernadette Mayer	Works and Days	Finalist	
2017	Layli Long Soldier	Whereas	Winner	
2017	Ana Ristović	Directions for Use	Finalist	
2017	James Longenbach	Earthling	Finalist	
2017	Nuar Alsadir	Fourth Person Singular	Finalist	
2017	Frank Ormsby	The Darkness of Snow	Finalist	
2018	Ada Limón	The Carrying	Winner	
2018	Terrance Hayes	American Sonnets for My Past and Future Assassin	Finalist	
2018	Adam Zagajewski with Clare Cavanagh (trans.)	Asymmetry	Finalist	
2018	Erika Meitner	Holy Moly Carry Me	Finalist	
2018	Diane Seuss	Still Life with Two Dead Peacocks and a Girl	Finalist	
2019	Morgan Parker	Magical Negro	Winner	
2019	Ilya Kaminsky	Deaf Republic	Finalist	
2019	Brian Teare	Doomstead Days	Finalist	
2019	Mary Ruefle	Dunce	Finalist	
2019	Jericho Brown	The Tradition	Finalist	
2020	Francine J. Harris	Here Is the Sweet Hand	Winner	
2020	Danez Smith	Homie	Finalist	
2020	Amaud Jamaul Johnson	Imperial Liquor	Finalist	
2020	Victoria Chang	Obit	Finalist	
2020	Chris Nealon	The Shore	Finalist	
2021	Diane Seuss	Frank: Sonnets	Winner	
2021	B.K. Fischer	Ceive	Finalist	
2021	Rajiv Mohabir	Cultish	Finalist	
2021	Donika Kelly	The Renunciations: Poems	Finalist	
2021	Cheswayo Mphanza	The Rinehart Frames	Finalist	
2022	Cynthia Cruz	Hotel Oblivion	Winner	
2022	Paul Hlava Ceballos	banana [ ]	Finalist	
2022	David Hernandez	Hello I Must Be Going	Finalist	
2022	Mosab Abu Toha	Things You May Find Hidden in My Ear	Finalist	
2022	Bernadette Mayer	Milkweed Smithereens	Finalist	
2023	Kim Hyesoon	Phantom Pain Wings	Winner	
2023	Romeo Oriogun	The Gathering of Bastards	Finalist	
2023	Robyn Schiff	Information Desk	Finalist	
2023	Charif Shanahan	Trace Evidence	Finalist	
2024	Anne Carson	Wrong Norma	Winner	
2024	Jennifer Chang	An Authentic Life	Finalist	
2024	Oliver Baez Bendorf	Consider the Rooster	Finalist	
2024	Dawn Lundy Martin	Instructions for the Lovers	Finalist	
2024	Carl Phillips	Scattered Snows, to the North	Finalist	
2025	Kevin Young	Night Watch	Winner	
2025	Yuki Tanaka	Chronicle of Drifting	Finalist	
2025	Rickey Laurentiis	Death of the First Idea	Finalist	
2025	Henri Cole	The Other Love	Finalist	
2025	Tolu Oloruntoba	Unravel	Finalist	
