= Justin Chin =

Malaysian-American poet, essayist and performer (1969–2015)

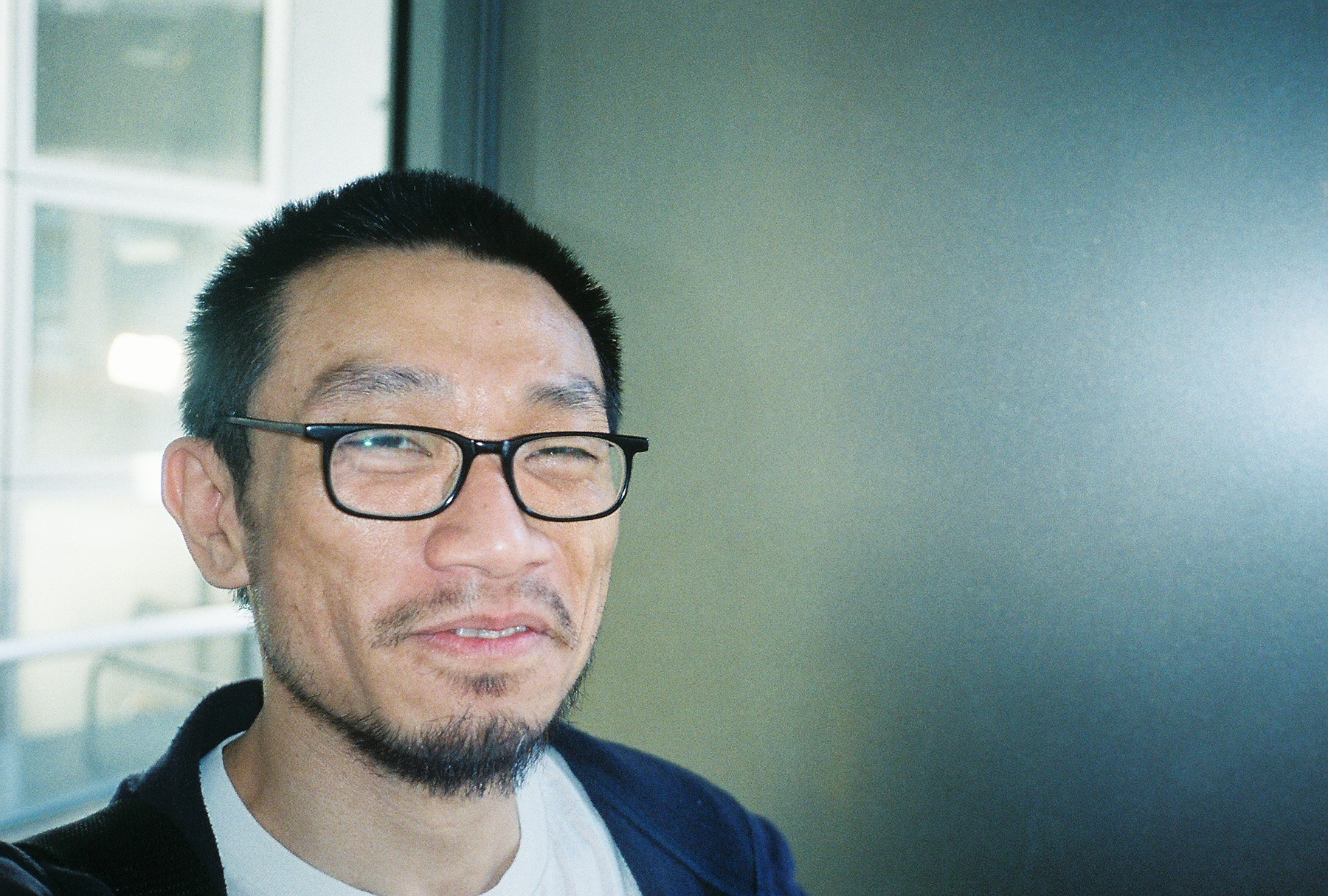
- Portrait of Justin Chin by Kevin Killian (Jan. 6 2006)
- Born: 8 September 1969; Malaysia
- Died: 24 December 2015; San Francisco
- Education: University of Hawaii at Manoa
- Occupations: poet, essayist, performer
- Writing career
- Language: English
- Genres: Queer literature, Poetry slam
- Notable works: Bite Hard, Mongrel, Harmless Medicine, Gutted, 98 Wounds
- Notable awards: Thom Gunn Award

Justin Chin (1969–2015) was a Malaysian-American poet, essayist and performer. In his work he often dealt with queer Asian-American identity and interrogated this category's personal and political circumstances.

== Biography ==
Chin was born in Malaysia and was raised in Singapore by his parents of whom his father was a Christian physician and had high expectations for his son. After graduating from school in Singapore he left home and enrolled at the University of Hawaii at Manoa.

As a freshman, he signed up for Intro to Creative Writing which was an important turn for his development as a writer. Faye Kicknosway, who is a poet and visual artist, was teaching this class and she became an important figure in Chin's early career. She encouraged him to write and introduced him to R. Zamora Linmark and Lisa Asagi, who remained important supporters of his art throughout his life. In 1990 Justin Chin attended the first Outwrite Conference in San Francisco with economic support from the faculty advisor to the university's gay and lesbian group. About this experience Justin Chin wrote: "Being at that conference showed me what was possible, that I could find myself in a continuum, a lineage that was grand and literary, that needed no elucidation or defense, no vindication or apologia."

After the conference, in 1991, he moved to San Francisco where he took residence for the rest of his life. He transferred to the journalistic program at San Francisco State University. Shortly after moving to San Francisco he started writing poems, essays, fiction and performance pieces to express his opinions in a less limited media. In 1995 and 1996 he became a member of the San Francisco National Poetry Slam team. In 1996 he was also awarded a "Goldie" "for the distinction of his spoken word performances".

In 1997 he published his first poetry collection Bite Hard (Manic D Press). Bite Hard was followed by the collections Harmless Medicine (Manic D Press, 2001) and Gutted (Manic D Press, 2006), which was the winner of the 2007 Thom Gunn Award and finalist for the Lambda Literary Award.

In addition to these collections he also wrote four books of quasi-autobiographical prose of which the first was Mongrel: Essays, Diatribes + Pranks (St. Martin's Griffin, 1999). followed by Burden of Ashes (Alyson Books, 2002; Manic D Press, 2022). In 2005 he published a collection of performance art texts documenting his performance work from 1993 to 2001 under the title Attack of the Man-Eating Lotus Blossoms (Suspect Thoughts Press). In 2011 he had his first fiction collection published: 98 Wounds (Manic D Press, 2011) "Other than his published work Chin has created eight full-length solo performance works and several shorter works that he has performed around the United States."

Chin died from a stroke on December 24, 2015, related to complications of AIDS.

== Themes ==
In his authorship, Justin Chin dealt with identity categories such as Asian American, Gay writer and Queer. In Bite Hard for example, Justin Chin "explores his identity as an Asian, a gay man, an artist, and a lover". These categories of 'radicalized desire', and their intersections, are categories that have also influenced his own life (see Biography). His "performance pieces and writings articulate a lot of pains and angers at how queer Asians are invisibilized by gay white men and despised by straight Asian circles and communities" and his work is often "unflinching, and frequently biting, commentary on racial stereotypes, racial tension, Asian-American identity, American consumerism, sexuality, and queer identity." That collection explores how the erotic can function through racial difference by exploring questions of racial and sexual shame and abjection such as rimming. Literary critic Chris A. Eng argues that "Chin's poetry collection consciously evokes 'sweet pain' through depictions of shameful, queer sex to reframe and contest dominant modes of consuming Asian American culture."

As with many other queer writers Chin included experiences from his own life and everyday in his writings. Not only things and happenings are included from the actual world Chin lived in, but "attitudes, values and desires". In the book Mongrel: Essays, Diatribes + Pranks Chin is carefully describing the identity navigation in school: "The stigma of being associated with the queens who were so resoundingly ribbed and teased and tormented made me nestle in my comfy closet: I was on the swim team, I participated in sports – something the queens never dreamed of doing".

Through his works Justin Chin worked to give voice to marginalized groups of racial, national or sexual minorities. He questioned the usefulness of categories and language by acknowledging that "men and women, white people and people of color, straight people and LGBT people, lesbians, gay men, bisexuals and trans persons do not sound the same. We are not homogenous." In the same Mongrel: Essays, Diatribes + Pranks he also questions identities as he writes: "I've given up the dream of the Queer Nation. Race, class, gender, ideologies, and values will always divide us ... I am so over being queer these days, and I don't care what I call myself these days or what anyone else calls me; it's all a matter of convenience these days." In this way he used his writings to problematize the dominant language and naming by not purely accepting it but rather problematizing it as a "matter of convenience". Problematizing and critique were some of the core goals of his writings. In an interview with Gerry Gomez Pearlberg for Frigate 'zine, Chin said, "Every work of art that works as art is a critique."

== Awards, fellowships and grants ==
- California Arts Council
- Djerassi Artist Residency
- Franklin Furnace Fund for Performance Art Awards (1998)
- PEN American Center
- PEN Center USA West
- Publishing Triangle's Thom Gunn Award for Poetry (2007)
- Lambda Literary Award finalist (2011, 2006, 2002, 1998)
- Bay Area Book Reviewers' Association Award finalist

== Bibliography ==
=== Novels and poetry ===
- Bite Hard (1997) - First collection of poetry. Finalist for the Firecracker Alternative Book Awards and the Lambda Literary Awards.
- Mongrel (1999) - Collection of biographical and opinionated essays (1994-1997).
- Harmless Medicine (2001) - Collection of poetry. Finalist for the Firecracker Alternative Book Awards, the Lambda Literary Awards and the Bay Area Book Reviewers Association Awards.
- Burden of Ashes (2002) - Collection of biographical and opinionated essays
- Attack of the Man-Eating Lotus Blossoms (2005) - Collections of writing from performance art text-based works
- Gutted (2006) - winner of 2007 Thom Gunn Award for gay male poetry; finalist for the Lambda Literary Awards
- 98 Wounds (2011) - Collection of short fiction.
- Justin Chin: Selected Works (2016) - An anthology of writing by Justin Chin from his 7 published books, with short remembrances by Beth Lisick, Michelle Tea, Rabih Alameddine, et al., edited by Jennifer Joseph

=== Contributions and appearances ===
- "Imagining America." in The Outlaw Bible of American Poetry. Ed. Alan Kaufman. Basic Books, 1999. P. 264.
- "Why a Boy," "Cocksucker's Blues," "Undetectable," "Ex-boyfriends Named Michael." in The World in Us: Lesbian and Gay Poetry of the Next Wave. Ed. Michael Lassell, Elena Georgiou. Stonewall Inn editions, 2000. pp. 32–39.
- "I Buy Sea Monkeys." in Take Out: Queer Writing from Asian Pacific America. Ed. Quang Bao, Hanya Yanagihara, Timothy Liu. Temple University Press, 2001.
- "And Judas Boogied until His Slippers Wept." in Gay American Autobiography: Writings from Whitman to Sedaris. Ed. David Bergman. Univ of Wisconsin Press, 2009. pp. 390–400.
- "Some Notes, Thoughts, Recollections, Revisions, and Corrections Regarding Becoming, Being, and Remaining a Gay Writer". Who's Yer Daddy?: Gay Writers Celebrate Their Mentors and Forerunners. Ed. Jim Elledge, David Groff. University of Wisconsin Press, 2012. pp. 52–57.
- “The Beginning of My Worthlessness.” in "Queer13: Lesbian And Gay Writers Recall Seventh Grade," William Morrow Paperbacks, 1999, pp. 39–48.
