= Charif Shanahan =

American poet and translator

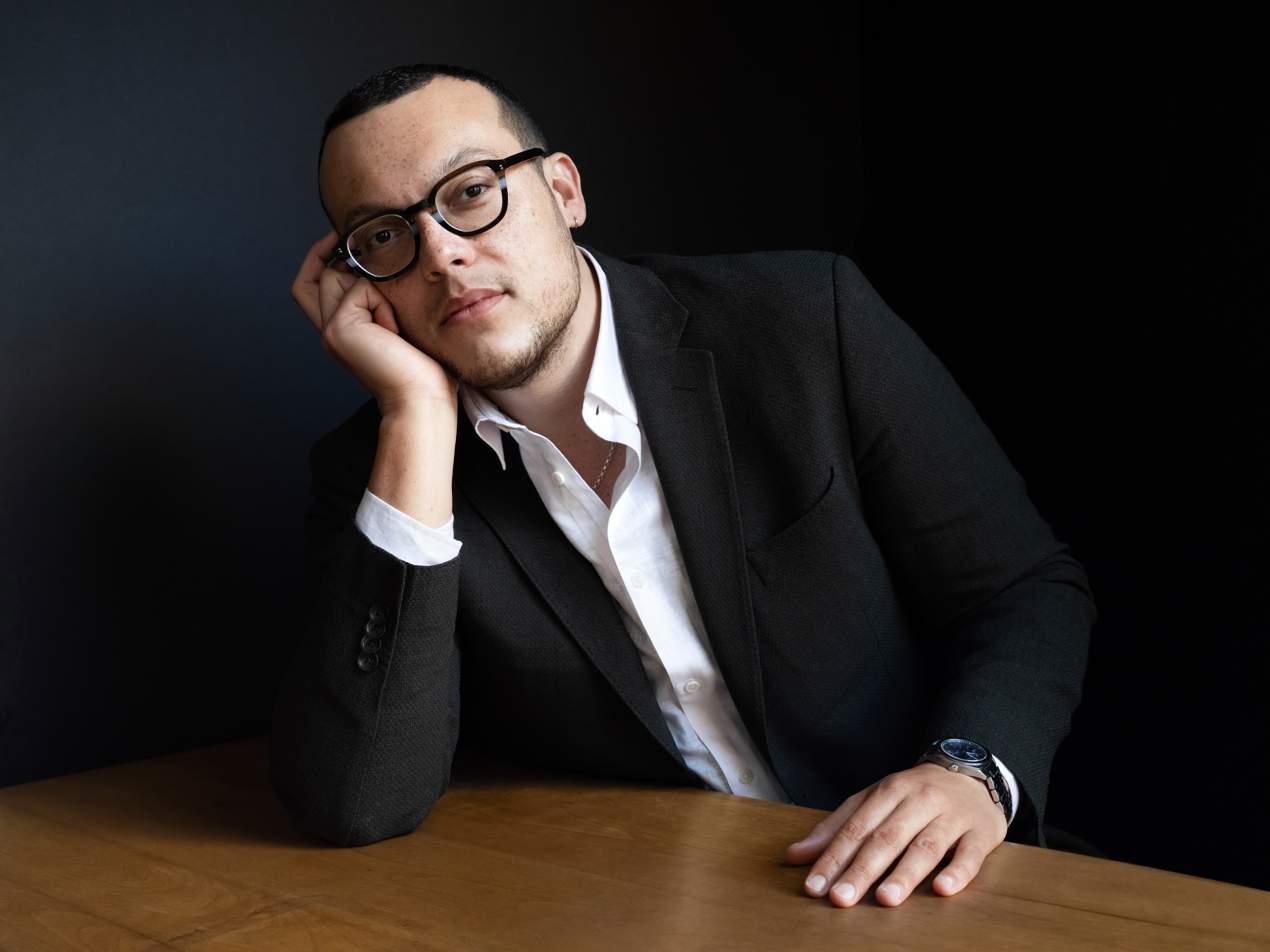
- Shanahan in 2024
- Born: 1983 (age 42–43)
- Education: Princeton University; Dartmouth College; New York University
- Occupations: Poet, teacher, translator
- Notable work: Trace Evidence
- Website: charifshanahan.com

Charif Shanahan (born 1983) is an American poet, educator, editor, and translator.

== Early life and education ==
Shanahan was born in the Bronx to an Irish American father from New York City and a Moroccan mother. His paternal line originates in County Kerry, Ireland. His maternal line migrated from southern Morocco to Casablanca and extends through Morocco to Mali, Mauritania, and Senegal. During his twenties, Shanahan lived transnationally in the United Kingdom, Morocco, Italy, and Switzerland.

He holds an AB in Comparative Literature and Creative Writing from Princeton University; an AM in Comparative Literature and Literary Translation from Dartmouth College; and an MFA in Poetry from NYU's Graduate Creative Writing Program, where he studied with Sharon Olds and Yusef Komunyakaa, with whom he had first worked as an undergraduate at Princeton.

== Career ==
Shanahan's debut poetry collection Into Each Room We Enter without Knowing: poems (Southern Illinois UP, 2017) was the recipient of the Crab Orchard Series in Poetry First Book Award, selected by Allison Joseph, and a finalist for the Lambda Literary Award for Gay Poetry and the Publishing Triangle's Thom Gunn Award. Shanahan was called "a vital and profound new voice" by Publishers Weekly.

His second collection, Trace Evidence: Poems (Tin House, 2023), was a finalist for the National Book Critics Circle Award for Poetry and the Kingsley Tufts Poetry Award, longlisted for the National Book Award for Poetry, and winner of the Lambda Literary Award for Gay Poetry, the Publishing Triangle's Thom Gunn Award, and the Whiting Award. About Shanahan's work, the 2024 Whiting Award judges wrote:

"In these elegant poems, Charif Shanahan sets out to discover how a person should live . . . love turns itself, in his hands, into a crucible to understand other truths—about race, sexuality, belonging. These urgent questions are explored with reserve and exactitude, granting us a clarity that’s profound."

Shanahan's poems are anthologized in Poetry Is Not a Luxury: Poems for All Seasons (Simon & Schuster, 2025; ed. Anonymous), Essential Queer Voices of U.S. Poetry (Green Linden Press, 2024; ed. Christopher Nelson), African American Poetry: 250 Years of Struggle & Song (Library of America, 2020; ed. Kevin Young), Furious Flower: Seeding the Future of African American Poetry (Northwestern UP, 2019; eds. Lauren K. Alleyne, Joanne V. Gabbin), and American Journal: Fifty Poems for Our Time (Graywolf Press, 2018; ed. Tracy K. Smith).

Currently, he is an Assistant Professor at Northwestern University, where he teaches in the undergraduate and Litowitz MFA+MA creative writing programs. Previously, he taught at Stanford University, where he held both a Wallace Stegner Fellowship in Poetry and Jones Lectureship in Poetry. Shanahan has also taught in the MFA Programs at California College of the Arts and University of California, Irvine.

His translations from Italian of Gëzim Hajdari and Donata Berra have been published in Circumference, A Public Space, and RHINO Poetry.

From December 2022 through July 2023, Shanahan served as Guest Editor of Poetry magazine.

In 2026, Shanahan served as one of twelve monthly Guest Editors for the Poem-a-Day program at the Academy of American Poets.

== Awards and honors ==
- Whiting Award, 2024
- National Book Critics Circle Award, Finalist, 2024
- Lambda Literary Award for Gay Poetry, Winner, 2024
- Thom Gunn Award, Publishing Triangle, Winner, 2024
- Hurston/Wright Legacy Award, Finalist, 2024
- National Book Award for Poetry, Longlist, 2023
- National Endowment for the Arts Literature Fellowship (2019)
- Robert Rauschenberg Foundation Poetry Fellow (2019)
- MacDowell Poetry Fellow (2019)
- James Baldwin Writer-in-Residence, La Maison Baldwin, St. Paul de Vence (2018)
- Lambda Literary Award for Gay Poetry, Finalist, 2018
- Thom Gunn Award, Publishing Triangle, Finalist, 2018
- Wallace Stegner Fellowship in Poetry, Stanford University (2016–18)
- Millay Colony for the Arts Fellow (2016)
- Cave Canem Foundation Fellowship (2013–15)

== Books ==
- —— (2017). Into Each Room We Enter without Knowing: Poems (paperback ed.). Carbondale: Southern Illinois University Press. ISBN 9780809335770.
- —— (2023). Trace Evidence: Poems. Portland, Oregon: Tin House. ISBN 9781953534668.
