= Greg Hewett =

American poet and professor

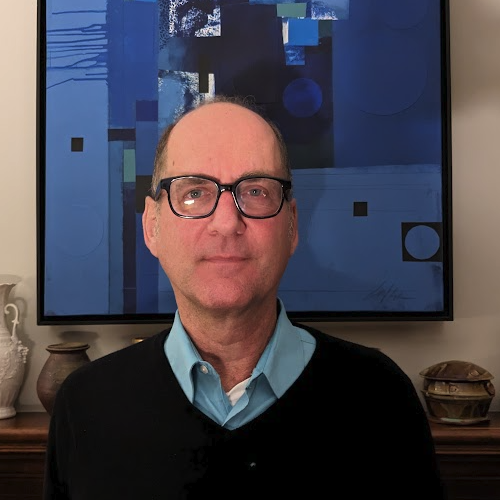
- Greg Hewett in March 2024
- Born: May 15, 1958 (age 68)
- Education: Binghamton University (B.A.); University of California–Davis (M.A.); University at Albany, SUNY (D.A.)
- Occupations: Poet and professor
- Writing career
- Language: English
- Genre: Poetry
- Notable works: Blindsight darkacre The Eros Conspiracy; Red Suburb; To Collect the Flesh
- Notable awards: Thom Gunn Award

Greg Hewett (born 15 May, 1958) is an American poet, novelist, and professor. He has been awarded several fellowships and awards for his work, including the Thom Gunn Award.

== Biography ==
Hewett's parents were Nancy and Jack Hewett.

He earned his Bachelor of Arts degree at Binghamton University, his MA at the University of California–Davis, and his Doctorate of Arts at University at Albany, SUNY.

Hewett teaches English and creative writing at Carleton College. He has served on the board of Quatrefoil Library. He has also lived in Japan and France.

== Awards ==
Hewett was a Fulbright fellow in Denmark and Norway, as well as at the Camargo Foundation in Provence.

In 2003, Hewett won the Publishing Triangle Thom Gunn Award for his 2002 collection Red Suburb. The Eros Conspiracy was a finalist in 2007. darkacre was a finalist for the Lambda Literary Award for Gay Poetry in 2011.

In 2018, he was named the O'Brien Poet at the University of Southern Maine.

His books have been nominated for the Minnesota Book Awards twice.

== Bibliography ==
In addition to the collections listed below, his work has appeared in The Boston Review and The Denver Quarterly, among other literary magazines. He has also collaborated with visual artist Fred Hagstrom (Hagstrom created covers and images for books that Hewett wrote).

- No Names (Coffee House Press, 2025)
- Blindsight (Coffee House Press, 2016)
- "The Tallahatchie Meets the Arve, or Unexpected Gay Confluences in the '70s" in Who's Yer Daddy? Gay Writers Celebrate their Mentors and Forerunners (Terrace Books, 2012)
- darkacre (Coffee House Press, 2010)
- The Eros Conspiracy (Coffee House Press, 2006)
- Red Suburb (Coffee House Press, 2002)
- To Collect the Flesh (New Rivers Press, 1996)
