= Not Here =

2018 poetry book by Hieu Minh Nguyen

- Author: Hieu Minh Nguyen
- Publisher: Coffee House Press
- Publication date: April 10, 2018
- Pages: 120
- Award: Publishing Triangle Thom Gunn Award for Gay Poetry
- ISBN: 978-1566895095
- Preceded by: This Way to the Sugar

Not Here is a 2018 poetry collection by Vietnamese American poet Hieu Minh Nguyen, published by Coffee House Press. Its included poems address topics such as queer Vietnamese American identity, body politics, trauma, family, and solitude. Nominated for several awards, the book won the Publishing Triangle's Thom Gunn Award for Gay Poetry in 2019.

== Content ==
Centered around Nguyen's experiences as a queer Vietnamese American, the book's poems span personal subject matter such as his childhood, as well as the trauma and abuse which he suffered earlier in his life. Poems like "Mother" and "Lesson" stemmed from hs specific relationships with his mother and father. Some of the book's poems, such as "Notes on Staying", were performed live for slam poetry, the poetry scene where Nguyen first got involved as an upcoming poet in the Twin Cities, specifically on the Button Poetry stage. Several of the poems also address Nguyen's changing relationship to the Twin Cities metro area, "whether to leave or stay."

== Critical reception ==
In 2019, Not Here won the Publishing Triangle's Thom Gunn Award in Gay Poetry, and was a finalist for the Lambda Literary Award for Gay Poetry.

In a starred review, Publishers Weekly wrote, "Nguyen communicates with stunning clarity the ambivalence of shame, how it can commandeer one's life and become almost a comfort." The publication also chose the book for their Editors' Pick for the Best New Books.

Stephanie Burt, writing for The New York Times, called Not Here a "concise and unsettling second book of poems" and, with regard to his representation of pain, said "very few could do what Nguyen has done." Major Jackson, for Poets.org, noted "the intense sense of longing and hunger that pulses at the center of his poems". Alexander Chee called the book "essential", and The Adroit Journal said "There is clarity in this grief—a realization of the full value of what has been lost, and in that clarity, at least, some sense of peace."

diaCRITICS, the publication of the Diasporic Vietnamese Artists Network, wrote, "Nguyen’s poems brilliantly replay the nightmare of how all traumas are connected; how one trauma leads to another and another and another; and how the abused body, when separate from the self, becomes a possession sometimes precious and sometimes despised, can self-destruct and cease its desire to live."

Muzzle Magazine noted its "edge of clarity and urgency" reminiscent of Sharon Olds.
