= Manic D Press =

American literary publisher

- Founded: 1984
- Founder: Jennifer Joseph
- Country of origin: United States
- Headquarters location: San Francisco, California
- Distribution: Consortium Book Sales & Distribution (US); Publishers Group Canada (Canada); Turnaround Publisher Services (UK)
- Publication types: Books
- Official website: manicdpress.com

Manic D Press is an American literary press based in San Francisco, California publishing fiction (novels and short stories), poetry, cultural studies, art, narrative-oriented comix, children's books, and alternative travel trade paperbacks. It was founded by Jennifer Joseph in 1984, as an alternative outlet for young writers seeking to bring their work into print, and since its founding has expanded its mission to include writers of all ages. Manic D books have been translated into more than a dozen languages, including Russian, Japanese, Polish, Danish, Korean, and Hebrew.

== Distributors ==
Manic D Press books are distributed to the trade throughout the US by Consortium and wholesalers including AK Press, Microcosm Publishing, Bookazine, and Ingram; in the UK and EU by Turnaround PSL; in Canada by Publishers Group Canada; and throughout the world by Ingram.

== Awards ==
Awards presented to Manic D Press include:

- 1998 American Institute of Graphic Arts juried traveling exhibition 50 Books, 50 Covers
- 1997 Firecracker Alternative Book Award for Art
- 2000 American Library Association GLBT Award for Literature
- 2002 and 2000 Firecracker Alternative Book Awards for Fiction
- Sept/Oct 2003 and March/April 2004 Booksense 76 lists
- San Francisco Bay Guardian's Best of the Bay 2004: 'Best Quintessentially San Franciscan Publisher'.
- 2007 Publishing Triangle's Thom Gunn Award for Poetry ("Gutted" by Justin Chin)
- 2008 Publishing Triangle's Edmund White Award for Debut Fiction ("Dahlia Season" by Myriam Gurba)
- SF Weekly's Best of San Francisco 2008: "Best Small Press"
- 2009 Lambda Literary Award for Transgender Writing ("Intersex (For Lack of a Better Word)" by Thea Hillman)
- 2010 Lambda Literary Award for Transgender Writing ("Lynnee Breedlove's One Freak Show" by Lynn Breedlove)
