= PEN/Joyce Osterweil Award for Poetry =

The PEN/Joyce Osterweil Award for Poetry was awarded by PEN America in odd-numbered years in recognition of a book of poetry with "high literary character" by a new and emerging American poet of any age with "the promise of further literary achievement."

== Description ==
The PEN American Center awards have been characterized as being among the "major" American literary prizes. From 1999 to June 1, 2020, the PEN/Joyce Osterweil Award for Poetry was awarded by PEN America (formerly PEN American Center) in odd-numbered years in recognition of a book of poetry with "high literary character" by a new and emerging American poet of any age with "the promise of further literary achievement." The winner received $5,000. The award was one of many PEN awards sponsored by PEN International affiliates in over 145 PEN centres around the world. It was replaced with an annual PEN/Voelcker Award for Poetry Collection.

== Award winners ==
PEN/Joyce Osterweil Award for Poetry winners
Year	Author	Title	Ref.
1999	Nick Flynn	Some Ether	
2001	Richard Matthews	The Mill Is Burning	
2003	Dana Levin	In the Surgical Theatre	
2005	Yerra Sugarman	Forms of Gone	
2007	Peter Covino	Cut Off the Ears of Winter	
2009	Jeffrey Yang	An Aquarium	
2011	Ishion Hutchinson	Far District	
2013	Rowan Ricardo Phillips	The Ground: Poems	
2015	Saeed Jones	Prelude to Bruise	
2017	Natalie Scenters-Zapico	The Verging Cities	
2019	Jonah Mixon-Webster	stereo(TYPE)	
