= Crush (Richard Siken) =

Collection of poetry

- Cover of the 20th-anniversary edition
- Author: Richard Siken
- Language: English
- Genre: Poetry
- Publisher: Yale University Press
- Publication date: 2004
- Publication place: United States
- Media type: Print
- Pages: 80
- ISBN: 9780300107890
- Followed by: War of the Foxes

Crush is the debut collection of poetry by American poet Richard Siken. It was selected as the winner of the 2004 Yale Series of Younger Poets competition by Nobel laureate Louise Glück.

In May 2025 Yale University Press published a 20th anniversary edition of 'Crush', with an introduction by Dana Levin, forward by Louise Glück and a new afterword by Richard Siken.

== Themes ==
The collection of poems contemplate infatuation, intimacy, loss, and grief. It is said that Siken's main inspiration was the death of his boyfriend in the early 1990s.

The opening poem, "Scheherazade" (the title refers to the character from One Thousand and One Nights) intimates inevitability and is foreboding in its tone. It positions the reader as an accomplice to its dealings. In Louise Glück's review of the poem, she makes the observation, "Tell me, the poet says, the lie I need to feel safe, and tell me in your own voice, so I believe you. One more tale to stay alive."

== Reception ==
The Huffington Post's Victoria Chang praises the poet for writing with a "cinematic brilliance and urgency".

In the foreword to Crush, competition judge Louise Glück wrote that the poems contained "cumulative, driving, apocalyptic power, [and] purgatorial recklessness", and that "Books of this kind dream big [...] They restore to poetry that sense of crucial moment and crucial utterance which may indeed be the great genius of the form."

== Accolades ==
- Yale Series of Younger Poets (winner)
- National Book Critics Circle Award (finalist)
- Lambda Literary Award (finalist)
- Thom Gunn Award (winner)
