= Your Emergency Contact Has Experienced an Emergency =

2022 poetry collection by Chen Chen

- Author: Chen Chen
- Genre: Poetry
- Publisher: BOA Editions
- Publication date: September 13, 2022
- Pages: 158
- ISBN: 978-1-950774-69-2

Your Emergency Contact Has Experienced an Emergency is a 2022 poetry collection by Chen Chen, published by BOA Editions.

== Form ==
The book interrogates family, queerness, and Chinese American identity amidst the Trump presidency and the COVID-19 pandemic. It is divided into four parts, corresponding to the four seasons, and uses forms like prose poetry and a recurring sequence based on Bhanu Kapil's "12 Questions."

In an interview with PEN America, Chen discussed queer anger as a source of knowledge for the collection, and similarly, in Electric Literature, he described embracing anger as generative rather than destructive.

== Critical reception ==
The Chicago Review of Books wrote that Chen "traverses a wide ground...past and present, personal and universal," commending how his poems are "richly textured, tender, and often humorous."

RHINO called it "a lavish and generous book," lauding Chen's handling of "vulnerable subjects" like family, isolation, and violence.

The Poetry Foundation observed Chen's maximalism and "melted when, after many estrangements over Chen's gayness, his mother makes a gesture of reconciliation in the Chinese manner, with food."

West Trade Review praised the collection's formal range and sentimentality.

Ink Sweat and Tears praised it as a sustained act of "trying again" in the face of personal and political adversity.
