= Phillip B. Williams =

American poet (born 1986)

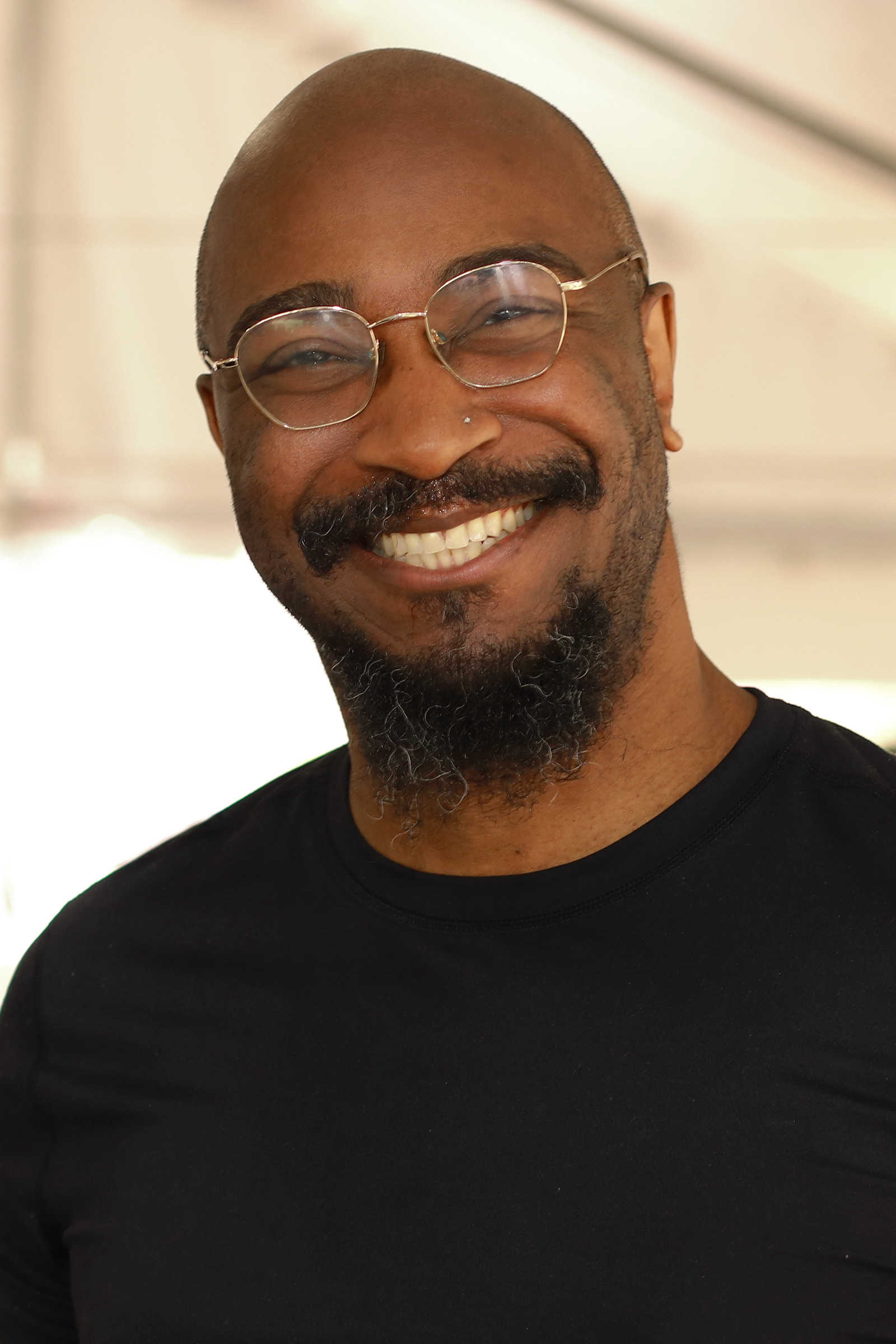
- Williams at the 2024 Texas Book Festival
- Born: 1986 (age 39–40); Chicago, Illinois, U.S.
- Education: Washington University in St. Louis (MFA)
- Occupations: Poet, novelist
- Writing career
- Genres: Poetry, Fiction
- Notable awards: Kate Tufts Discovery Award, Whiting Award for Poetry

Phillip B. Williams (born 1986) is an American poet. Born in Chicago, he is the author of the chapbooks Bruised Gospels and Burn, as well as the full length poetry collections Thief in the Interior and MUTINY.

== Career ==
He graduated with an MFA from Washington University where he was a Chancellor’s Graduate fellow. For several years he was a faculty member at Bennington College. Williams was a Poetry Fellow at the 2018 Conference on Poetry at The Frost Place. His poetry has been featured in Callaloo, The Kenyon Review Online, The Southern Review, Painted Bride Quarterly, West Branch, and Blackbird. Williams is a Cave Canem Foundation graduate as well as co-editor in chief, with KMA Sullivan, of the online journal Vinyl.

Williams' work has been praised for its "devout and excruciating attention to the line [whose] indispensable [sic] music fuses his implacable understanding of words with their own shadows." His debut novel Ours, published by Viking Books, was released on February 20, 2024.

== Awards ==
Thief in the Interior was the winner of the 2017 Kate Tufts Discovery Award and the 2017 Lambda Literary Award for Gay Poetry. In 2017 Williams was awarded a Whiting Award for Poetry.

MUTINY was the winner of the 2022 American Book Award, finalist for both the 2022 PEN/Voelcker Award for Poetry and Publishing Triangle’s 2022 Thom Gunn Award for Gay Poetry, and longlisted for the PEN/Jean Stein Book Award.

== Bibliography ==
=== Poetry ===
Collections

- Thief in the Interior (Alice James Books, 2016). ISBN 9781938584176, OCLC 903436605
- Mutiny: Poems (Penguin, 2021). ISBN 9780143136934

Chapbooks

- Bruised Gospels (Arts in Bloom Inc., 2011). ISBN 9780983761105, OCLC 808013493
- Burn - a chapbook within Frequencies, Volume One: A Chapbook and Music Anthology (YesYes Books, 2013). ISBN 9781936919116

Contributions to anthologies

- Jericho Brown (ed) Prime : poetry & conversation, Alexander, AR: Sibling Rivalry Press, 2014. ISBN 9781937420734, OCLC 880974097

List of poems

Title	Year	First published	Reprinted/collected
Final poem for my father misnamed in my mouth	2021	Williams, Phillip B. (January 4–11, 2021). "Final poem for my father misnamed in my mouth". The New Yorker. 96 (43): 64.	
