= Half-light: Collected Poems 1965–2016 =

2017 poetry collection by Frank Bidart

- Cover of first edition
- Author: Frank Bidart
- Audio read by: Frank Bidart
- Language: English
- Genre: Poetry
- Publisher: Farrar, Straus and Giroux
- Publication date: August 15, 2017
- Publication place: United States
- Media type: Print (hardcover and paperback), e-book, audiobook
- Pages: 736
- Awards: Pulitzer Prize for Poetry (2018); National Book Award for Poetry (2017)
- ISBN: 978-0-374-12595-0 (hardcover)
- OCLC: 1033476114
- Dewey Decimal: 811/.54
- LC Class: PS3552.I33 2017

Half-light: Collected Poems 1965–2016 is a 2017 poetry collection by Frank Bidart. It was published by Farrar, Straus and Giroux on August 15, 2017. Half-light is a comprehensive book of Bidart's poetry, collecting all of his previous collections as well as a new volume, Thirst (2016).

The collection won the 2018 Pulitzer Prize for Poetry. Judges of the prize called the book "a volume of unyielding ambition and remarkable scope that mixes long dramatic poems with short elliptical lyrics, building on classical mythology and reinventing forms of desires that defy societal norms." The collection also won the 2017 National Book Award for Poetry.

== Contents ==
- In the Western Night: Collected Poems 1965–90 (1990)
  - In the Western Night (1990)
  - The Sacrifice (1983)
  - The Book of the Body (1977)
  - Golden State (1973)
  - The First Hour of the Night (1990)
- Desire (1997)
- Star Dust (2005)
- Watching the Spring Festival (2008)
- Metaphysical Dog (2013)
- Thirst (2016)

== Reception ==
Publishers Weekly called it "an almost overwhelming bounty, a permanent book".

Elizabeth Lund of The Washington Post called it a "monumental work" and praised Bidart's storytelling ability.

== Awards and recognition ==
- 2018 Pulitzer Prize for Poetry, winner
- 2017 National Book Award for Poetry, winner

== Publication history ==
- Half-light: Collected Poems 1965–2016 (hardcover). Farrar, Straus and Giroux. 15 August 2017. ISBN 978-0-374-12595-0. 736pp.
- Half-light: Collected Poems 1965–2016 (paperback). Farrar, Straus and Giroux. August 21, 2018. ISBN 9780374537692. 736pp.
