= Mark Bibbins =

American poet

- Born: 1968 (age 57–58); Albany, New York, U.S.
- Education: Hunter College (BA); The New School (MFA)
- Occupation: Poet
- Writing career
- Language: English
- Notable work: Sky Lounge; 13th Balloon
- Notable awards: Lambda Literary Award; Thom Gunn Award

Mark Bibbins (born 1968) is an American poet. His poetry collections include Sky Lounge (2003), which won a Lambda Literary Award for Gay Poetry, and 13th Balloon (2020), which won the Thom Gunn Award for Gay Poetry.

== Life and career ==
Bibbins was born in Albany, New York, in 1968. He received a B.A. from Hunter College and an M.F.A. from The New School.

He teaches in the graduate writing programs at Columbia University and The New School, where he co-founded LIT, the journal of The New School Creative Writing Program, and in New York University's Writers in Florence program.

Bibbins's first collection, Sky Lounge, was published by Graywolf Press in 2003. It won the Gay Men's Poetry category at the 16th Annual Lambda Literary Awards.

His second collection, The Dance of No Hard Feelings, was published by Copper Canyon Press in 2009. Copper Canyon also published his third collection, They Don't Kill You Because They're Hungry, They Kill You Because They're Full, in 2014. Publishers Weekly reviewed the book in 2014 and later included it on its Best Books of 2014 poetry list.

Bibbins's fourth collection, 13th Balloon, was published by Copper Canyon Press in 2020. The book is a book-length poem and elegy connected to the AIDS crisis and the death of Mark Crast. The Publishing Triangle awarded it the 2021 Thom Gunn Award for Gay Poetry.

== Bibliography ==
- Sky Lounge. Graywolf Press, 2003. ISBN 9781555973803.
- The Dance of No Hard Feelings. Copper Canyon Press, 2009. ISBN 9781556592928.
- They Don't Kill You Because They're Hungry, They Kill You Because They're Full. Copper Canyon Press, 2014. ISBN 9781556594588.
- 13th Balloon. Copper Canyon Press, 2020. ISBN 9781556595776.
