= Blas Falconer =

American poet

Blas Falconer is an American poet, editor, and professor.

== Works ==
Blas Falconer is the author of four full-length poetry collections: A Question of Gravity and Light (University of Arizona Press, 2007); The Foundling Wheel (Four Way Books, 2012); Forgive the Body This Failure (Four Way Books, 2018); and Rara Avis (Four Way Books, 2024), which won the Thom Gunn Award for Gay Poetry. His poems have appeared in literary journals, including The Adroit Journal, Alaska Quarterly Review, Green Mountains Review, The Harvard Review, The New York Times, Poetry, and Terrain.org.

Along with poets Beth Martinelli and Helena Mesa, Falconer co-edited Mentor & Muse: Essays from Poets to Poets (Southern Illinois University Press, 2010). With writer Lorraine M. López, Falconer co-edited The Other Latin@: Writing Against a Singular Identity (University of Arizona Press, 2011).

Falconer is Editor in Chief of Poetry International Online. Previously, he served as the poetry editor for both Zone 3 Press and Zone 3.

== Biography ==
Raised in the suburbs of Washington D.C., Falconer spent most summers in Salinas, Puerto Rico, with his maternal grandmother. Falconer is a Professor of Poetry in the MFA program at San Diego State University.

== Education ==
Falconer holds a B.A. from George Mason University, an M.F.A. from the University of Maryland, and a Ph.D. in Creative Writing and Literature from the University of Houston.

== Awards ==
- 2009: Maureen Egen Writers Exchange Award from Poets & Writers
- 2011: National Endowment for the Arts Fellowship
- 2025: Thom Gunn Award for Gay Poetry for Rara Avis

== Bibliography ==
=== Poetry collections ===
- The Perfect Hour (Pleasure Boat Studio: A Literary Press, 2006). ISBN 1929355319.
- A Question of Gravity and Light (University of Arizona Press, 2007). ISBN 0816526222.
- The Foundling Wheel (Four Way Books, 2012). ISBN 188480098X.
- Forgive the Body This Failure (Four Way Books, 2018). ISBN 1945588179.
- Rara Avis (Four Way Books, 2024). ISBN 1961897024.

=== Edited essay collections ===
- Mentor and Muse: Essays from Poets to Poets (Southern Illinois University Press, 2010), co-edited with Beth Martinelli and Helena Mesa. ISBN 0809329891.
- The Other Latin@: Writing Against a Singular Identity (University of Arizona Press, 2011), co-edited with Lorraine M. López. ISBN 0816528675.
