= Michael McKeown Bondhus =

American poet and author of four books

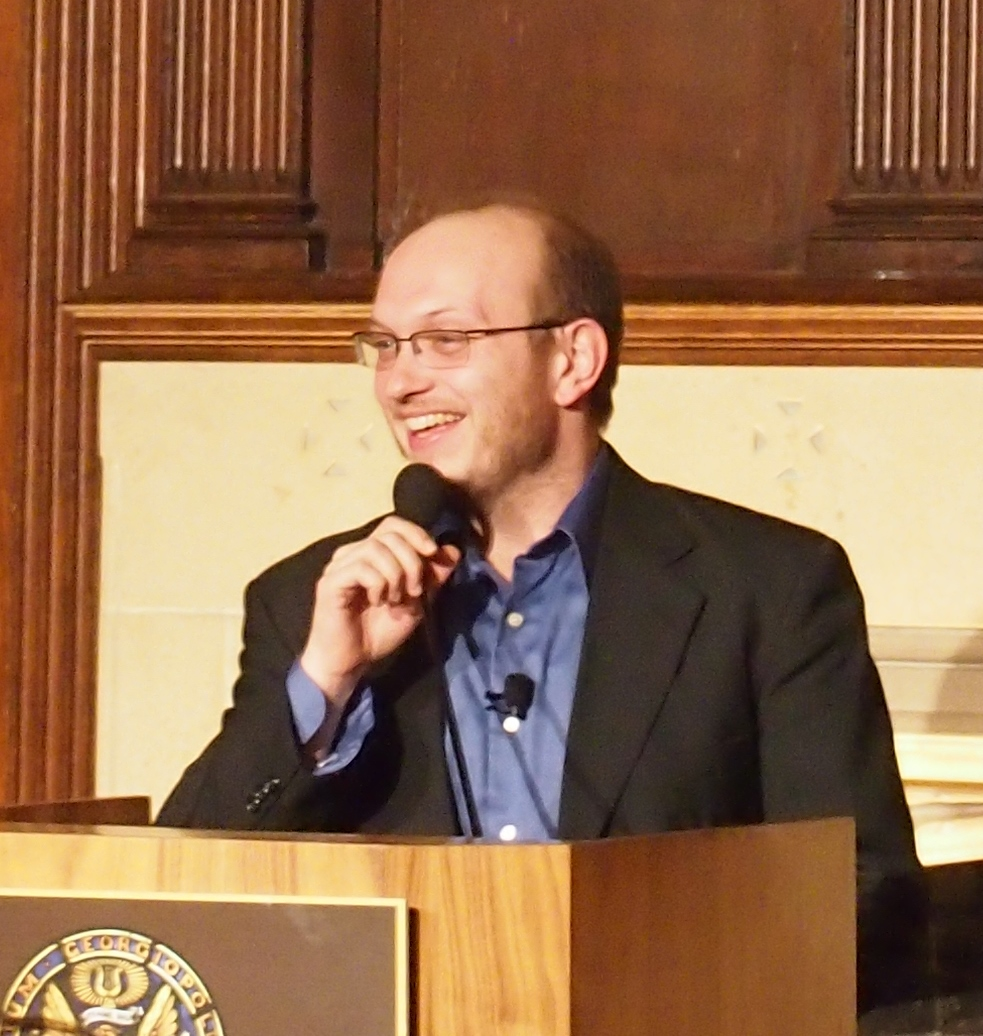
- Michael McKeown Bondhus at Lannan Center for Poetics and Social Practice, Georgetown University, 2014
- Born: Charlie Bondhus; 1981 (age 44–45)
- Education: Saint Anselm College; Goddard College; University of Massachusetts Amherst
- Writing career
- Language: English
- Genre: Poetry
- Notable awards: Main Street Rag Poetry Book Award; Thom Gunn Award for Gay Poetry

Michael McKeown Bondhus (born Charlie, 1981) is an American poet and author of four books. His second book, All the Heat We Could Carry, was the winner of the 2013 Main Street Rag Poetry Book Award, the 2014 Thom Gunn Award for Gay Poetry, and a finalist for the Gival Press Poetry Book Award.

== Early life and career ==
He grew up in Connecticut and graduated from Saint Anselm College. He received his MFA from Goddard College and his Ph.D. from the University of Massachusetts Amherst. He served as poetry editor at The Good Men Project from 2013 to 2017, and currently teaches English and creative writing at Raritan Valley Community College.

His work has appeared in Poetry, The Missouri Review, Hayden's Ferry Review, The Baltimore Review, Copper Nickel, Bellevue Literary Review, and Cold Mountain Review, among others.

He is openly gay.

== Bibliography ==
- What We Have Learned to Love. Brickhouse Books. 2008. ISBN 978-0-932616-95-1.
- How the Boy Might See It. Pecan Grove Press. 2009. ISBN 978-1-931247-72-6.
- Monsters and Victims. Gothic Press. 2010. ISBN 978-0-913045-18-3.
- All the Heat We Could Carry. Main Street Rag. 2013. ISBN 978-1-59948-436-5.
- Divining Bones. Sundress Publications. 2018. ISBN 978-1939675743.
- Occult High School Revolution. Unsolicited Press. 2027. ISBN 978-1-969421-21-1.

== Awards and recognition ==
- 2007 Blue Light Press First Book Award Finalist for How the Boy Might See It
- 2008/2009 Brickhouse Books Stonewall Competition Winner for What We Have Learned to Love
- 2013 Main Street Rag Poetry Book Award
- 2013 Gival Press Poetry Book Award—Finalist
- 2014 Thom Gunn Award for All the Heat We Could Carry
- 2016 Brittingham/Pollak Award Finalist for Divining Bones
- 2017 Tampa Review Prize Finalist for Divining Bones
