= Punks (poetry collection) =

2021 poetry collection by John Keene

Punks: New & Selected Poems
- Author: John Keene
- Publisher: The Song Cave
- Publication date: December 1, 2021
- Pages: 234
- Awards: National Book Award for Poetry; Lambda Literary Award for Gay Poetry; Thom Gunn Award
- ISBN: 978-1737277521
- Preceded by: Playland

Punks: New & Selected Poems is a 2021 poetry collection by John Keene, published by The Song Cave. It won the 2022 National Book Award for Poetry, the 2022 Lambda Literary Award for Gay Poetry, and the 2022 Thom Gunn Award.

== Contents and background ==
A collection of new and selected poems, the book's contents were written across three decades and inhabit various modes of poetry. In seven sections, the poems address Keene's identity as a black LGBTQ man and addresses topics like the AIDS crisis among other matters. For the Otherppl podcast, Keene said the poems were not elegies but rather "a collection of a range of possibilities of how one might portray a life and lives, how one might portray experiences. I wanted to draw on a range of poetic genres and forms to do that."

At The Song Cave, Keene worked with editors Alan Felsenthal and Ben Estes on the manuscript. One central question about the book's original manuscript was "how do we make this work?" as its length, structure, and form were initially difficult to pull together. Keene said that his previous projects in fiction were helpful in figuring out how to give the book "a sense of movement."

== Critical reception ==
Upon awarding Keene the National Book Award for Poetry, the judges stated that "John Keene’s poems in Punks: New & Selected Poems invoke the notion of flow—which speaks beautifully to the idea of fluidity and movement in form—a flow that is constantly being interrupted by philosophical musings and deep longings, thick with queer desire ... Punks is a monumental enterprise in scrupulous and hopeful transformations."

In a starred review, Publishers Weekly called the book a "brilliant, expansive collection" and said "This powerful book is brimming with energy and memorably phrased insights."

Critics lauded the ambitiousness and vastness of Keene's poetics. The Poetry Foundation appreciated Keene's diversity of styles and techniques, observing that his poems "move fluently among so many modes—personal, political, experimental, anecdotal, lyrical". Also for the Poetry Foundation, J. Howard Rosier called the book "a singular achievement" consisting of its unique, different parts, in which an understanding of Keene's self is greatly deepened with complexity. Chicago Review argued that the title represented Keene's defiance against "American poetry writ large ... for its whiteness, its maleness, and its alignment with state and institutional power"; the critic observed how Keene's "formal plenitude" paired with his approach to the "historical record" made for a poetry collection with strong conviction. Similarly, the Poetry Project said the various technical angles Keene employs in his poems allow him to develop depth on "the social space from where his writing self-consciously operates." The Cleveland Review of Books compared the book's experimentation and inventiveness to that of Everything Everywhere All at Once.
