= Dana Levin =

American poet

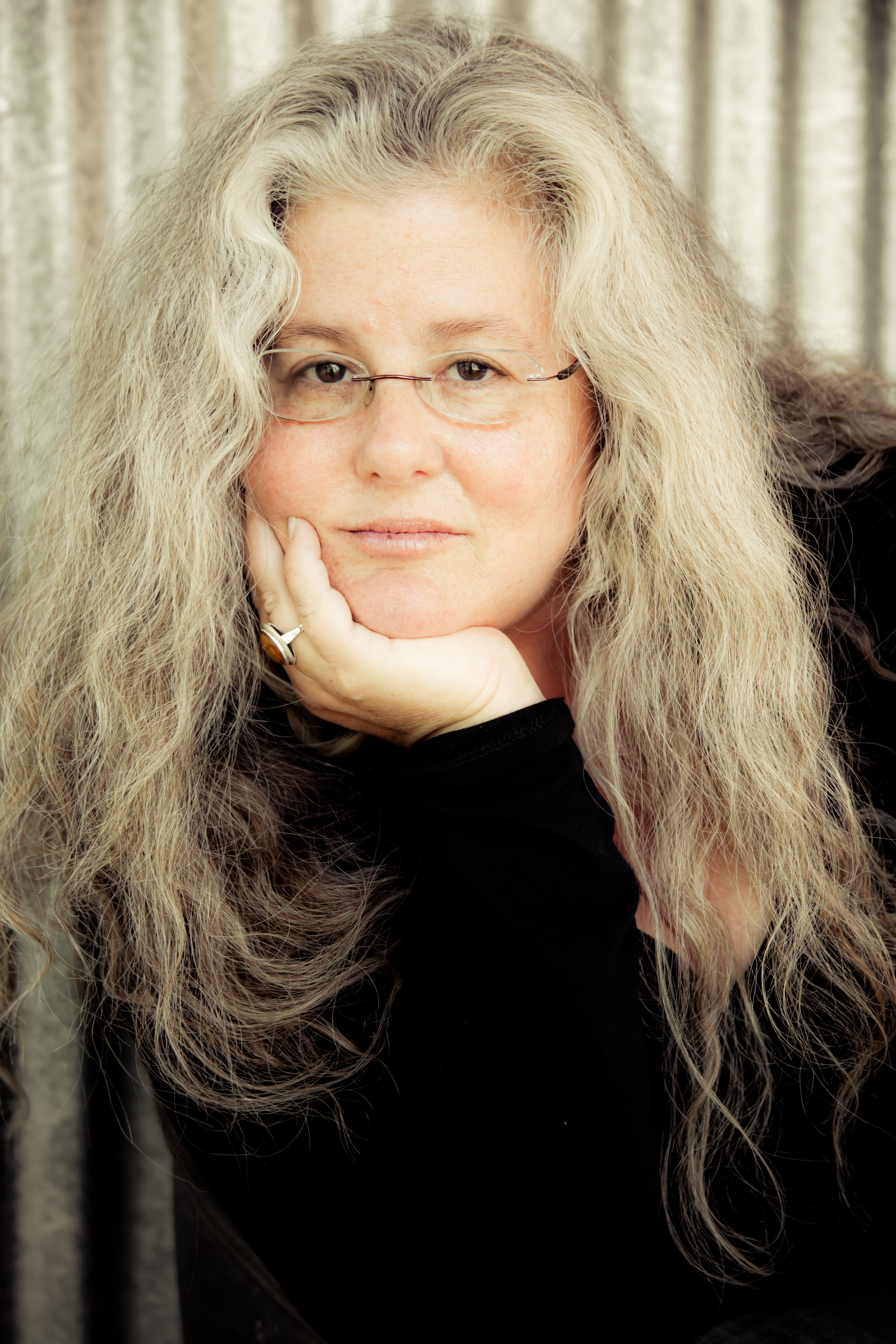
- Born: 1965 (age 60–61); Los Angeles, CA, United States
- Education: Pitzer College; New York University.
- Writing career
- Genre: Poetry

Dana Levin (born 1965) is a poet and teaches Creative Writing at Maryville University in St. Louis, where she serves as Distinguished Writer in Residence. She also teaches in the Warren Wilson College MFA Program for Writers. She lives in Saint Louis, Missouri.

== Life ==
She earned degrees from Pitzer College and the Creative Writing Program at New York University.

Her first book, In the Surgical Theatre, was chosen by Louise Gluck for the 1999 American Poetry Review/Honickman First Book Prize (Copper Canyon Press. Her second book, Wedding Day, was released in 2005 and her third, Sky Burial, in 2011. In reviewing Sky Burial, The New Yorker called it "utterly her own, and utterly riveting." the Los Angeles Times says of Levin's work, "Dana Levin's poems are extravagant...her mind keeps making unexpected connections and the poems push beyond convention...they surprise us." Her most recent book is Now Do You Know Where You Are, which was released by Copper Canyon Press in 2022.

== Awards ==
- 1999 National Endowment for the Arts Grant
- 2000 John C. Zacharis First Book Award
- 2003 PEN/Joyce Osterweil Award for Poetry, In the Surgical Theatre
- 2004 Rona Jaffe Foundation Writers' Award
- 2004 Witter Bynner Fellowship from the Library of Congress
- 2005 Whiting Award for poetry
- 2007 Guggenheim Fellowship in Poetry

== Works ==
- In The Surgical Theatre. American Poetry Review/Copper Canyon Press. 1999. ISBN 978-0-9663395-2-9.
- Wedding Day. Copper Canyon Press. 2005. ISBN 978-1-55659-219-5.
- Sky Burial. Copper Canyon Press. 2011. ISBN 978-1-55659-219-5.
- Banana Palace. Copper Canyon Press. 2016. ISBN 978-1-55659-505-9.
- Now Do You Know Where You Are, Copper Canyon Press, 2022

=== Anthologies ===
- Michael Dumanis; Cate Marvin, eds. (2006). Legitimate dangers: American poets of the new century. Sarabande Books. ISBN 978-1-932511-29-1.
- Joan Murray, ed. (2006). The Pushcart Book of Poetry. Pushcart Press. ISBN 978-1-888889-34-5.
- Gerald Costanzo; Jim Daniels, eds. (2000). American poetry: the next generation. Carnegie Mellon University Press. ISBN 978-0-88748-343-1.
