= How We Fight for Our Lives =

2019 memoir by Saeed Jones

- First edition cover
- Author: Saeed Jones
- Language: English
- Genre: Memoir
- Publisher: Simon & Schuster
- Publication date: October 8, 2019
- Publication place: United States
- Media type: Print (hardback and paperback), audiobook, e-book
- Pages: 208 (hardcover)
- ISBN: 978-1501132735

How We Fight for Our Lives is a coming-of-age memoir written by American author Saeed Jones and published by Simon & Schuster in 2019. The story follows Jones as a young, Black, gay man in 1990s Lewisville, Texas as he fights to carve out a place for himself, within his family, within his country, within his own hopes, desires, and fears.

== Reception ==
How We Fight for Our Lives has earned widespread critical acclaim.

It received starred reviews from Publishers Weekly, Library Journal and Kirkus Reviews. NPR called the book an "Extremely personal, emotionally gritty, and unabashedly honest...outstanding memoir." The Los Angeles Review of Books noted that "Jones displays a poet’s knack for the searing detail, and the pages of his memoir are full of beautiful and surprising images that buoy us through the pain and heartache and often seething rage that fuel its propulsive, precise narration."

In 2019 the book won the Kirkus Prize for Nonfiction; in 2020 it won the Lambda Literary Award for Gay Memoir/Biography, the Stonewall Book Award-Israel Fishman Non-Fiction Award and the Randy Shilts Award for gay nonfiction. It was listed in Kirkus Reviews' Best Books of 2019 in the Best Memoirs section and on Time's list of must-read books of 2019.
