= Turtle Point Press =

American publisher

- Founded: 1990
- Founder: Jonathan D. Rabinowitz
- Country of origin: United States
- Headquarters location: Brooklyn, New York
- Distribution: Consortium Book Sales & Distribution
- Key people: Ruth Greenstein
- Publication types: Books
- Imprints: Books & Co., Helen Marx Books
- Official website: www.turtlepointpress.com

Turtle Point Press, founded in 1990, publishes new fiction, literary nonfiction, poetry, memoirs, works in translation, and rediscovered classics.

== History ==
Jonathan D. Rabinowitz established Turtle Point Press in 1990. During his tenure the press had two imprints, Jeannette Watson’s Books & Co. and the eponymous Helen Marx Books. In 2016, longtime Turtle Point Press editor and associate Ruth Greenstein took over running the press. Founding publisher Jonathan D. Rabinowitz stays on as editor-at-large.

== Awards and Distinctions ==
Two books by Turtle Point Press were named by The New York Times Book Review as notable books of the year: Bertram Cope's Year by Henry Blake Fuller, which is regarded as the first American gay novel, and was originally published in 1919. The other is a 1997 memoir by Leila Hadley of her travels in India, A Journey With Elsa Cloud. The latter was published under the dual imprint Books & Company/Turtle Point.

Additional Turtle Point Press books that have received recognition are:

- Without Saying by Richard Howard - Finalist for the National Book Award
- Trappings by Richard Howard - Lambda Literary Award
- Sources by Devin Johnston - Shortlisted for a National Book Critics Circle Award
- Tales Out of School by Benjamin Taylor - Harold Ribelow Award for Best Jewish Novel of the Year
- Broken Irish by Edward J. Delaney - PEN/New England Book Award, selected for several year-end Top Ten Books of the Year
- Dear Prudence: New and Selected Poems by David Trinidad - Selected for several year-end Top Ten Books of the Year
- The Deposition of Father McGreevy by Brian O'Doherty - Shortlisted for a Man Booker Prize
- Silbermann by Jacques de Lacretelle - French-American Foundation Translation Award
- What It Is Like: New and Selected Poems by Charles North - Named one of the year's best poetry books by National Public Radio

== Authors ==
Turtle Point Press has published works by Richard Howard, Devin Johnston, Grace Schulman, David Trinidad, Roger Rosenblatt, and Charles North, as well as Julien Gracq, Mark Strand, Wayne Koestenbaum, Katharine Coles, Herman Portocarero, Anna Moschovakis, and Charles Henri Ford. The press published the letters of New York School poet James Schuyler, and has co-published with the Academy of American Poets, Hanging Loose Press, and Farrar, Straus & Giroux.
