= Ana Ristović =

Serbian poet

Ana Ristović (Serbian Cyrillic: Ана Ристовић; born 1972) is a Serbian poet, writer, and literary translator. Her poetry has been translated into more than a dozen languages and awarded both in Serbia and abroad.

== Biography ==
She was born in Belgrade and graduated in Serbian literature and language with general literature at the University of Belgrade Faculty of Philology. She moved to Ljubljana, Slovenia, in 1998 for six years, and returned to Belgrade in 2004.

Ristović has been publishing poetry since age 18 and won the Branko Radičević Prize for the best Serbian poetry debut for Snovidna voda (1994). Her poems have been published in English, German, Polish, Hungarian, Slovak and Macedonian among others, and represented in several domestic and foreign anthologies.

In 2005, she won Germany's Hubert Burda Prize for young East European poets. In 2014, The New Yorker published Ristović’s “Snow in Your Shoes”, translated by Steven and Maja Teref, and later listed it as one of their 15 poetry highlights for the year.

In addition to poetry, Ristović writes essays and literary criticism. She is also a translator from the Slovenian language, from which she has so far translated more than twenty books of contemporary prose and poetry.

== Publications ==
Ristović has published numerous books in Serbian and is one of the most widely translated contemporary Serbian poets.

=== Books in Serbian (first editions) ===
- Snovidna voda (1994)
- Uže od peska (1997)
- Zabava za dokone kćeri (1999)
- Život na razglednici (2003)
- Oko nule (2006)
- P.S – izabrane pesme (2009)
- Meteorski otpad (2013)
- Nešto svetli, izabrane i nove pesme (2014)
- Čistina (2015)
- Izabrane pesme (2017)
- Ruke u rukama (2019)
- Knjiga nestajanja (2020)
- Tu (2023)

=== Translated books ===
- Pred tridsiatkou (Slovakia, 2001)
- Življenje na razglednici (Slovenia, 2005)
- So dunkel, so hell (Austria, 2007)
- P.S. (Hungary, 2012)
- П.С. (Macedonia, 2016)
- Directions for use (USA, 2017)
- Śmieci z kosmosu (Poland, 2020)

== Awards ==
Her awards include:

- Branko Radičević Award for the best Serbian poetry debut (1994)
- Branko Miljković Award (2000)
- Hubert-Burda-Prize for young Eastern European poetry (2005)
- Milica Stojadinović Srpkinja Award (2010)
- Disova Award (2014)
- Desanka Maksimović Award (2018)
- Vasko Popa Award (2024)

Directions for Use, Ristović’s first poetry collection translated to English, was a finalist for 2017 National Book Critics Circle Award for Poetry, 2018 National Translation Award and 2018 Best Translated Book Award.
