= Devin Johnston =

American poet (born 1970)

- Born: March 14, 1970 (age 56); Canton, New York, US
- Education: University of Chicago (PhD); Oberlin College (BA)
- Writing career
- Genres: Poetry, Literary Criticism
- Subjects: Modernism, pastoral traditions, ecology, contemporary American and British poetry, prosody

Devin Johnston (born 14 March 1970) is an American poet, professor, publisher, and literary critic. He has written several books of poetry including Sources (2008), which was shortlisted for the National Book Critics Circle Award for Poetry. He serves as the Eugene A. Hotfelder Professor in the Humanities at Saint Louis University, Missouri. In 2001, he co-founded Flood Editions with Michael O'Leary, and they remain co-editors of this non-profit, independent publisher.

== Life and Career ==
Although Johnston was born in Canton, New York, he grew up in Winston-Salem, North Carolina. He began to write poetry at a young age but published only a few poems even into his twenties.

After receiving a BA from Oberlin College in 1992, Johnston studied to earn a PhD at The University of Chicago. From 1995 to 2000, while earning his degree and shortly after, he worked as poetry editor and managing editor for Chicago Review. Even before graduating from The University of Chicago in 1999, Johnston began to plan the founding of Flood Editions with his friend Michael O'Leary.

Flood Editions released its first two books in 2001. Currently, the press publishes 4 volumes of poetry, short prose, and art each year.

In the same year, Johnston released his own first book of poetry, Telepathy, through the Australian independent publisher Paper Bark Press.

Also soon after graduating from The University of Chicago, Johnston entered his first academic position at St. Louis University. As a professor there today, Johnston teaches literature and creative writing. His courses focus mainly on poetry. In addition to his teaching, Johnston organizes a speakers series and workshops at local prisons through the Saint Louis University Prison Education Program.

== Works ==
=== Poetry ===
- ——— (2001). Telepathy (poetry). London: Paper Bark Press. ISBN 978-1-877004-86-5.
- ——— (2004). Aversions (poetry). Richmond, California: Omnidawn Press. ISBN 9781890650162.
- ——— (2008). Sources (poetry). New York City: Turtle Point Press. ISBN 9781933527161.
- ——— (2011). Traveler: Poems (poetry). New York City: Farrar, Straus and Giroux. ISBN 9780374279332.
- ——— (2015). Far-Fetched: Poems (poetry). New York City: Farrar, Straus and Giroux. ISBN 9780374714086
- ——— (2019). Mosses and Lichens: Poems (poetry). New York City: Farrar, Straus and Giroux. ISBN 9780374719883.
- ——— (2023). Dragons: Poems (poetry). New York City: Farrar, Straus and Giroux. ISBN 9780374607302.

=== Literary Criticism ===
- ——— (2002). Precipitations: Contemporary American Poetry as Occult Practice (literary criticism). Middletown: Wesleyan University Press. ISBN 9780819565624.
- ——— (2009). Creaturely and Other Essays (literary criticism). New York City: Turtle Point Press. ISBN 9781933527222.

== Awards and Recognition ==
In 2012, Johnston was awarded the Friends of Literature prize by the Poetry Foundation for his poems New Song and A Close Shave.

The New York Times's "Best Poetry Books of 2015" included Johnston's fifth collection of poetry, Far-Fetched, and its "Best Poetry Books of 2019" included his seventh collection, Mosses and Lichens.
