= John Keene (writer) =

American poet (born 1965)

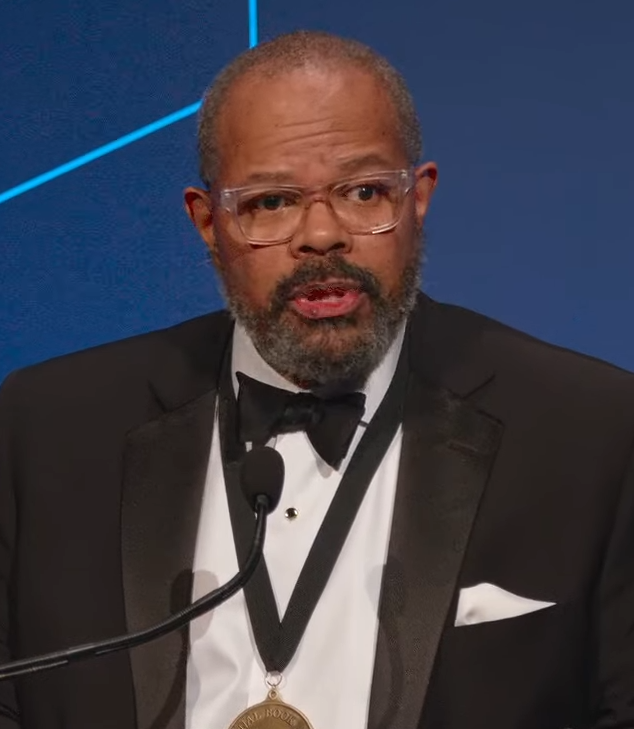
- Keene in 2022
- Born: 1965 (age 60–61); St. Louis, Missouri, U.S.
- Education: Harvard University (BA); New York University (MFA)
- Occupations: Writer; translator; professor; poet

John R. Keene Jr. (born 1965) is an American writer, translator, professor, and artist who was named a MacArthur Fellow in 2018. His 2022 poetry collection, Punks: New & Selected Poems, received the National Book Award for Poetry.

== Biography ==
John Keene was born and raised in the city of St. Louis, Missouri, and in Webster Groves, in St. Louis County. Raised Catholic, he attended parochial schools, and graduated from the Saint Louis Priory School. He has an A.B. from Harvard College, where he was a member of the Harvard Black Community and Student Theater (C.A.S.T.) and served as co-Circulation Manager and on the Art Board of the Harvard Advocate. He received an M.F.A. from New York University, where he was a New York Times Foundation Fellow. He was a longtime member of the Dark Room Collective, an organization that from 1988 to 1998 celebrated and gave greater visibility to emerging and established writers of color, and also is a Graduate Fellow of Cave Canem.

Formerly associate professor of English and African American studies at Northwestern University, Illinois, United States, he now is Distinguished Professor of English, chairs the African American and African Studies department, and teaches in the MFA in Creative Writing Program at Rutgers University-Newark. He has taught at Brown and NYU, and at the Indiana University Writer's Conference. For several years he has served as an editorial board member for the African Poetry Book Fund, which aims to promote contemporary poetry by African poets through a range of projects, including its book series, contests, workshops, seminars, and library-development efforts.

== Creative work ==
His first novel, Annotations, was published by New Directions in 1995. Publishers Weekly wrote that "Annotations is a work that should not be ignored and is worthy of the highest recommendation. It is an experimental text that points a new direction for literary fiction in the 21st century." A collection of poems entitled Seismosis, in conversation with artwork by Christopher Stackhouse, was published by 1913 Press in 2006.

In May 2015, New Directions published Counternarratives, his collection of short fiction, including several novellas. In its review Publishers Weekly described the book as "suspenseful, thought provoking, mystical, and haunting....Keene's confident writing doesn't aim for easy description or evaluation; it approaches (and defies) literature on its own terms." In her May 2015 review of Counternarratives in Harper's Magazine, Christine Smallwood said of Keene and the collection, "Counternarratives is an extraordinary work of literature. Keene is a dense, intricate, and magnificent writer." For this and earlier work, he received a 2016 Lannan Literary Award for Fiction. In August 2016, Counternarratives was awarded an American Book Award by the Before Columbus Foundation.

UK publisher Fitzcarraldo Editions released a British edition of Counternarratives in 2016. Reviewer Kate Webb wrote in her TLS review of Counternarratives that "the ambition, erudition and epic sweep of [Keene's] remarkable new collection of stories, travelling from the beginnings of modernity to modernism, place it in a class of its own. His book achieves no less than an imaginative repositioning of the history of the Americas." In March 2017 Fitzcarraldo was awarded the inaugural Republic of Consciousness Prize for Small Presses for Counternarratives, a unanimous decision by all six judges, who described Keene's collection as "a once in a generation achievement for short form fiction. Its subject matter, formal inventiveness, multitude of voices, and seriousness of purpose transform a series of thematically linked stories into a complete work of art."

GRIND, an art-poetry collaboration with photographer Nicholas Muellner, was published in February 2016 by ITI Press. A chapbook of old and new poems, Playland, was published by Seven Kitchens Press in September 2016.

== Translation projects ==
In 2014, Letters from a Seducer, his translation of Brazilian writer Hilda Hilst's 1991 novel Cartas de um sedutor, was published by Nightboat Books and A Bolha Editora. This translation was selected for the 2015 Best Translated Book Award Fiction Longlist. He has published translations from French, Portuguese and Spanish, of work by writers including Alain Mabanckou, Mateo Morrison, Edimilson de Almeida Pereira, Claudia Roquette-Pinto, and Jean Wyllys, among others.

He also has given talks and published essays on translation, including "Translating Poetry, Translating Blackness," one of a series of essays curated by poet and translator Daniel Borzutzky that appears on the Poetry Foundation's Harriet blog; the essay advocates for increased translation of poets of African descent, poets who consider themselves "black" (in Asia, Australia and the Pacific Islands), and other poets of color across the globe.

== Artistic projects ==
Keene also has engaged in public and durational conceptual events such as the "Emotional Outreach Project", under the rubric of the Field Research Study Group A, beginning in 2002. He has exhibited his work several times at This Red Door's short-term galleries, in Brooklyn and Berlin in 2013, and in January 2014 introduced his "Emotional Outreach Project 6.0: The Emotional Exercises," at TRD's space at Kunsthalle Galapagos in Brooklyn.

== Bibliography ==
- Annotations (New Directions Publishing Corporation, 1995)
- Seismosis (with artist Christopher Stackhouse) (1913 Press, 2006)
- Letters from a Seducer (translation of Hilda Hilst's Cartas de um sedutor) (Nightboat Books, 2014)
- Counternarratives (New Directions Publishing Corporation, 2015; Fitzcarraldo Editions (UK), 2016; Éditions Cambourakis (France), 2016)
- GRIND (with photographer Nicholas Muellner) (ITI Press, 2016)
- Playland (Seven Kitchens Press, 2016)
- Punks: New & Selected Poems (The Song Cave, 2021)

== Awards ==
- Fellowship in Fiction, Artists Foundation of Massachusetts and Massachusetts Cultural Council, 1990.
- AGNI John Cheever Short Fiction Prize in 2000 for "An Outtake from the Ideological Origins of the American Revolution."
- Fellowship in Poetry, New Jersey State Council on the Arts, 2003.
- Whiting Award for fiction/poetry, 2005.
- American Book Award for Counternarratives, 2016.
- Lannan Foundation Residency, 2016.
- Lannan Literary Award for Fiction, 2016.
- Republic of Consciousness Prize for Small Presses (UK), to Fitzcarraldo Editions, for Counternarratives, 2017.
- Windham–Campbell Literature Prize in Fiction, 2018.
- MacArthur Foundation "Genius" Fellowship, 2018.
- Harold D. Vursell Award for Distinguished Prose, American Academy of Arts and Letters, 2019.
- Fellow, New York Institute for the Humanities, 2019.
- Thom Gunn Prize, The Publishing Triangle, 2022.
- Lambda Literary Award for Gay Poetry, 2022.
- National Book Award for Poetry, 2022.
