= When I Grow Up I Want to Be a List of Further Possibilities =

2017 debut poetry collection by Chen Chen

- Author: Chen Chen
- Publisher: BOA Editions
- Publication date: April 11, 2017
- Pages: 96
- Awards: GLCA New Writers Award; Thom Gunn Award
- ISBN: 978-1942683339
- Preceded by: Kissing the Sphinx (chapbook)
- Followed by: Your Emergency Contact Has Experienced an Emergency

When I Grow Up I Want to be a List of Further Possibilities is a 2017 debut poetry collection by Chen Chen. It was published by BOA Editions following its selection by Jericho Brown for the A. Poulin Jr. Poetry Prize in 2016. Accordingly, it features a foreword by Brown. The book won several prizes, including the Thom Gunn Award.

== Background and content ==
A book about charting one's identity in the world, its poems concern various aspects of identity including queer, immigrant, and Asian American identity, as well as a diverse array of relationships which its speakers face. "In the City" is written for Monica Sok.

In his foreword, Brown wrote: "The major question of this book is how to feel. What is the proper emotional response to parents who physically attack us, to friends and family who object to our work as artists, to a nation that finds subtle ways to deny our citizenship while requiring our taxes?"

== Critical reception ==
In addition to the A. Poulin Jr. Poetry Prize, the book won several prizes. It won the GLCA New Writers Award and the Thom Gunn Award. It was longlisted for the National Book Award for Poetry and a finalist for the Lambda Literary Award for Gay Poetry. It was also designated a Barbara Gittings Literature Award Honor Book.

Lambda Literary Review stated: "Chen’s humor is unexpected and entrancing, his lyricism gorgeous, and his transparency truly worthy of a great deal of respect and admiration. Smart, funny, heartbreaking and, increasingly rare in contemporary poetry, a truly original voice When I Grow Up I Want to Be a List of Further Possibilites is a startling and important debut." The Kenyon Review wrote that "For all the restlessness, for all the movement between modes and identities, these poems are never impatient. They are comfortable in ambiguity and searching; they are process-oriented, fairly certain the product is the beginning of another process, another possibility."

Ploughshares commended the book's "directness", stating that "The poems are funny and uncomfortable and honest in their attempt to tell a story, relying on transparency rather than artifice." RHINO lauded the novelty with which Chen approached the moments and images in his poems: "As for the frustrations, banalities, ennui, and heartbreak of everyday life—what Chen does is reinvigorate them through catalogs of devoted attention". Los Angeles Review stated the book was "awesome" and "thoroughly of the moment, its energy devoted to explaining who Chen Chen is and how he got here." The Harvard Review observed and admired Chen's tension between the "cute" and the conflicts and violences which his speakers face. The American Poetry Review appreciated and related to Chen's sense of empathy for the mother figure shown in the book's poems. The Academy of American Poets said that "The poems are full of wisdom and wit, engaging with the slow revelation of the poet’s sense of self but also with metaphysics, psychology, and the cosmos".

The Rumpus selected the book for its Poetry Book Club in April 2017.
