= Frank Bidart =

American poet (b. 1939)

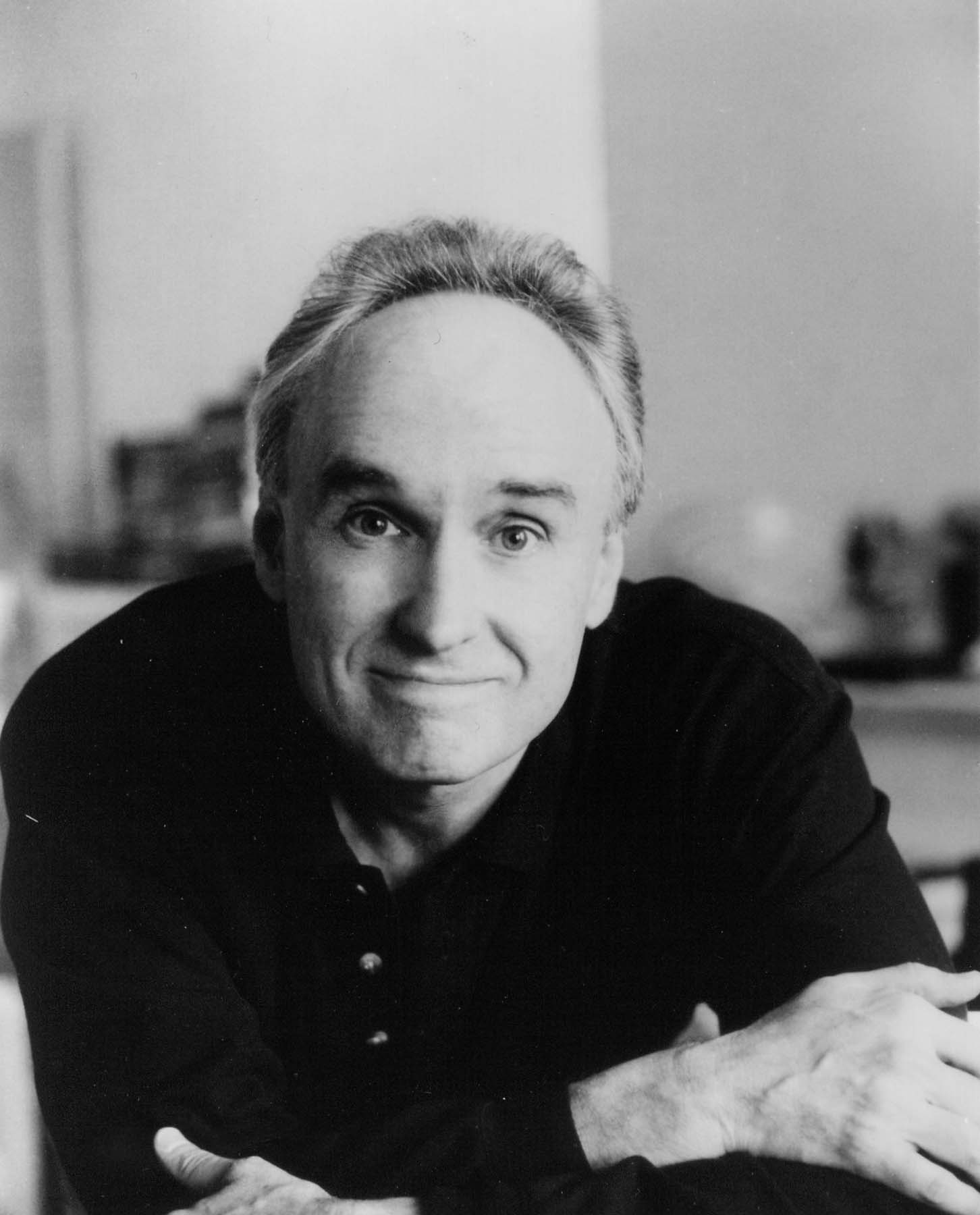
- Born: May 27, 1939 (age 87); Bakersfield, California, U.S.
- Education: University of California, Riverside (BA); Harvard University (MA)
- Occupations: Poet, professor
- Writing career
- Notable work: Golden State (1973); Desire (1997); Star Dust (2005); Metaphysical Dog (2013)
- Notable awards: Bollingen Prize in Poetry (2007) National Book Award (2017) Pulitzer Prize (2018)

Frank Bidart (born May 27, 1939, Bakersfield, CA) is an American academic and poet, and a winner of the Pulitzer Prize for Poetry.

== Biography ==
Bidart is a native of California and considered a career in acting or directing when he was young. In 1957, he began to study at the University of California at Riverside, where he was introduced to writers such as T.S. Eliot and Ezra Pound and started to look at poetry as a career path. He then went on to Harvard, where he was a student and friend of Robert Lowell and Elizabeth Bishop. He began studying with Lowell and Reuben Brower in 1962.

He has been an English professor at Wellesley College since 1972, and has taught at nearby Brandeis University. He lives in Cambridge, Massachusetts, and he is gay. In his early work, he was noted for his dramatic monologue poems like "Ellen West," which Bidart wrote from the point of view of a woman with an eating disorder, and "Herbert White," which he wrote from the point of view of a psychopath. He has also written openly about his family in the style of confessional poetry.

He co-edited the Collected Poems of Robert Lowell which was published in 2003 after years of working on the book's voluminous footnotes with his co-editor David Gewanter.

Bidart was the 2007 winner of Yale University's Bollingen Prize in American Poetry. His chapbook, Music Like Dirt, later included in the collection Star Dust, was a finalist for the 2003 Pulitzer Prize in poetry. His 2013 book Metaphysical Dog was a finalist for the National Book Award in Poetry and won the National Book Critics Circle Award.

He currently maintains a strong working relationship with actor and fellow poet James Franco, with whom he collaborated during the making of Franco's short film "Herbert White" (2010), based on Bidart's poem of the same name.

In 2017, Bidart received the Griffin Poetry Prize Lifetime Recognition Award and the 2017 National Book Award for Poetry for his book Half-light: Collected Poems 1965–2016.

He was awarded the 2018 Pulitzer Prize for Poetry for Half-light: Collected Poems 1965–2016.

== Awards and honors ==
Year	Work	Prize		Result	Reference
1981	"The War of Vaslav Nijinsky"	Bernard F. Conners Prize	—		
1991	—	Lila Wallace-Reader's Digest Foundation Writers' Award	—	Won	
1995	—	Morton Dauwen Zabel Award in Poetry	—	Won	
1997	—	Shelley Memorial Award	—	Won	
1998	—	Rebekah Johnson Bobbitt National Prize for Poetry	—	Won	
2000	—	Wallace Stevens Award	—	Won	
2003	Music Like Dirt	Pulitzer Prize	Pulitzer Prize for Poetry	Shortlisted	
2007	—	Bollingen Prize	—	Won	
2013	Metaphysical Dog	National Book Award	Poetry	Shortlisted	
2013	Metaphysical Dog	National Book Critics Circle Award	Poetry	Won	
2014	—	PEN	PEN/Voelcker Award for Poetry	Won	
2017	—	Griffin Poetry Prize	Lifetime Recognition	Won	
2017	Half-light: Collected Poems 1965–2016	National Book Award	Poetry	Won	
2018	Half-light: Collected Poems 1965–2016	Pulitzer Prize	Pulitzer Prize for Poetry	Won	

- 1992 Fellow of the American Academy of Arts and Sciences

== Bibliography ==
=== Poetry ===
- Golden State (1973)
- The Book of the Body (1977)
- The Sacrifice (1983)
- In the Western Night: Collected Poems 1965–90 (1990)
- Desire (1997) received the Theodore Roethke Memorial Poetry Prize and the 1998 Bobbitt Prize for Poetry; finalist for the Pulitzer Prize, the National Book Award, and the National Book Critics Circle Award
- Music Like Dirt (Sarabande Books, 2002)
- Star Dust (2005)
- Watching the Spring Festival (2008)
- Metaphysical Dog (2013)
- Half-light: Collected Poems 1965–2016 (2017), winner of the National Book Award in Poetry and the Pulitzer Prize for Poetry
- Against Silence (2021)

=== Other ===
- Editor, with David Gewanter, of Collected Poems of Robert Lowell (2003)

== Sources ==
- Rae Armantrout; John Ashbery; et al. (2002). The Best American Poetry 2002. Scribner Poetry. ISBN 0-7432-0386-0.
