= Saeed Jones =

American poet (born 1985)

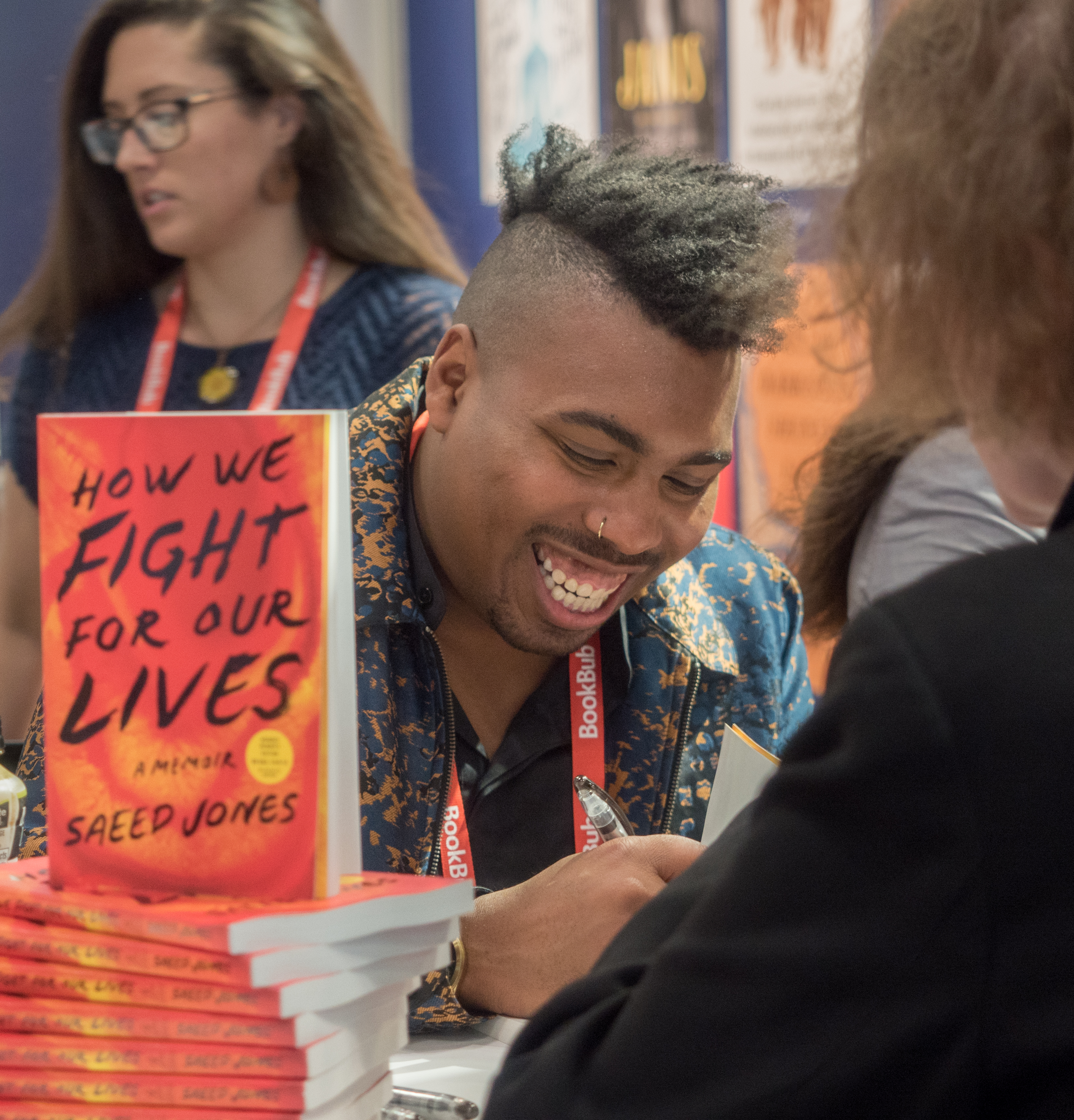
- Saeed Jones at BookExpo 2019
- Born: November 26, 1985 (age 40); Memphis, Tennessee, U.S.
- Education: Western Kentucky University (BA); Rutgers University–Newark (MFA)
- Writing career
- Notable works: Prelude to Bruise; How We Fight for Our Lives; Alive at the End of the World
- Notable awards: Pushcart Prize (2013); Kirkus Prize (2019); Lambda Literary Award (2020); Anisfield-Wolf Book Award (2023)
- Website: readsaeedjones.com

Saeed Jones (born November 26, 1985) is an American writer and poet. His debut collection, Prelude to Bruise, was named a 2014 finalist for the National Book Critics Circle Award for poetry. His debut memoir, How We Fight for Our Lives, won the 2019 Kirkus Prize for Nonfiction and 2020 Lambda Literary Award.

Jones's second memoir, Home Out There, will be published on May 18, 2027.

== Early life and education ==
Jones was born in Memphis, Tennessee and grew up in Lewisville, Texas. He attended college at Western Kentucky University, then earned an MFA in Creative Writing at Rutgers University–Newark.

== Career ==
Jones has been featured on PBS NewsHour's poetry series and on So Popular! with Janet Mock on MSNBC. He was featured on the cover of Hello Mr. in 2015.

=== Poetry ===
Jones released his debut poetry chapbook in 2011, When the Only Light is Fire. It was the top-selling book in the Gay Poetry category on Amazon for several weeks. Jones received a Pushcart Prize in 2013.

In 2014, Jones published his first full-length poetry collection, Prelude to Bruise, from Coffee House Press. Amal El-Mohtar for NPR called it "brilliant, unsparing," "visceral and affecting," and said "These are poems that look at hard, ugly experiences and wring a mythic sort of beauty from them." The Kenyon Review said the work "evokes a perilous, often mythic, eroticism within a brutalizing context of violence." TIME Magazine recommended it as "an engrossing read best consumed in as few sittings as possible." It was a 2014 finalist for the National Book Critics Circle Award and the 2014 Lambda Literary Award for Gay Poetry. Prelude to a Bruise won the Joyce Osterwell Award for Poetry from the PEN Literary Awards, and the 2015 Stonewall Book Award-Barbara Gittings Award for Literature.

In September 2022, Jones published a second poetry collection, Alive at the End of the World. The collection received starred reviews from Library Journal and Publishers Weekly, which stated: "This penetrating collection shows Jones at his poetic best." It won the 2023 Anisfield-Wolf Book Award in Poetry. The book was a finalist for the 2023 Lambda Literary Award for Gay Poetry and the 2023 Publishing Triangle Award-Thom Gunn Award for Gay Poetry.

=== Prose and other projects ===
Jones previously worked for BuzzFeed as the founding LGBT editor and its executive culture editor. While at BuzzFeed, Jones cohosted BuzzFeed News' morning show AM to DM from fall 2017 until mid-2019. Jones also wrote an advice column for BuzzFeed's READER newsletter entitled "Dear Ferocity."

His first memoir, How We Fight for Our Lives, was published by Simon & Schuster in 2019. The New Yorker called the book's tone and content "urgent, immediate, matter of fact". NPR called it an "outstanding memoir" with "elements that profoundly connect him to poetry" and to "many of us who grew up dreaming of a chance at upward social mobility". The book won the 2019 Kirkus Prize for Nonfiction and the 2020 Lambda Literary Award for Gay Memoir/Biography. It won the 2020 Stonewall Book Award-Israel Fishman Non-Fiction Award and the 2020 Randy Shilts Award for Gay Nonfiction.

In 2022, Jones's interview with Debbie Millman was featured on the Storybound (podcast) season 5 premiere.

In August 2022, Jones launched a SiriusXM podcast called Vibe Check. Co-hosted by Sam Sanders and Zach Stafford, the podcast focuses on "news and culture from a Black and queer perspective."

In September 2025, Jones and Maggie Smith released the anthology The People's Project: Poems, Essays, and Art for Looking Forward, featuring original and selected work from twenty-seven writers. "After the election of 2024, poets Jones and Smith looked to their 'mentors, siblings on the page, and friends' for hope and solace, strategies and commiseration. Their collection of 27 essays, poems, and artwork honors that diverse community of writers and artists who share their reflections on how to cope with oppression and how to move forward."

Jones's second memoir, Home Out There, will be published by Washington Square Press on May 18, 2027.

=== Teaching ===
He was the 2024-2025 artist-in-residence in the Media, Health and Medicine program at Harvard Medical School. Jones taught in the Bennington Writing Seminars from January 2024-May 2025.

== Personal life ==
Jones lives in Columbus, Ohio.

Jones was brought up to practice Nichiren Buddhism and still does today.

== Publications ==
=== Poetry collections ===
- When the Only Light is Fire. Sibling Rivalry Press. 2011. ISBN 9781937420031.
- Prelude to Bruise. Coffee House Press. 2014. ISBN 9781566893749.
- Alive at the End of the World. Coffee House Press. 2022. ISBN 9781566896511.

In Anthology

- Ghost Fishing: An Eco-Justice Poetry Anthology. University of Georgia Press. 2018. ISBN 9780820353159.

=== Memoir ===
- How We Fight for Our Lives. Simon & Schuster. 2019. ISBN 9781501132735.
- Home Out There. Washington Square Press. 2027. ISBN 9781668082584.

=== Anthology ===
- Saeed Jones; Maggie Smith (2025). The People's Project. Washington Square Press. ISBN 9781668207024.
