= Richard Siken =

American poet, painter, and filmmaker (born 1967)

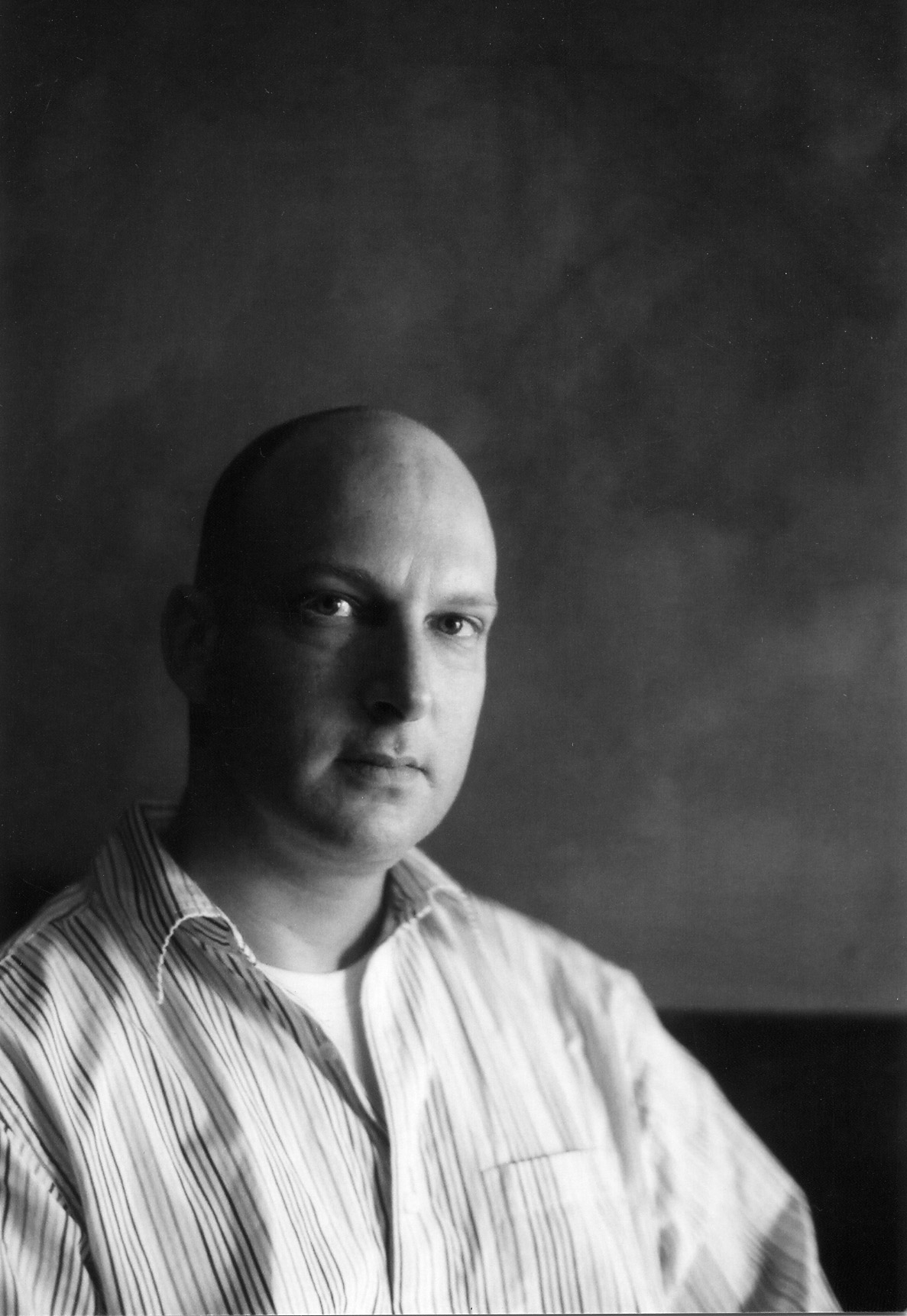
- Siken in 2001
- Born: 1967 (age 58–59); New York, New York, U.S.
- Education: University of Arizona
- Occupations: Poet; painter; filmmaker
- Writing career
- Notable works: Crush; War of the Foxes; I Do Know Some Things
- Notable awards: Yale Series of Younger Poets Competition (2004); Lambda Literary Award; Thom Gunn Award; National Book Award for Poetry finalist (2025)
- Website: richard-siken.com

Richard Siken (born 1967) is an American poet, painter, and filmmaker. His first poetry collection, Crush (2005), was selected by Louise Glück as the winner of the 2004 Yale Series of Younger Poets Competition and went on to win a Lambda Literary Award and a Thom Gunn Award. It was also a finalist for the National Book Critics Circle Award.

His later books include War of the Foxes (2015) and I Do Know Some Things (2025). For I Do Know Some Things, Siken was a finalist for the 2025 National Book Award for Poetry and the 2025 Los Angeles Times Book Prize in Poetry.

== Life and career ==
Siken was born in New York City in 1967 and moved to Tucson, Arizona, when he was two years old. He received a BA in psychology from the University of Arizona before entering its graduate creative writing program, where he later earned an MFA in poetry.

Before publishing his first book, Siken worked as a social worker for developmentally disabled adults; during his graduate-student years, he also worked with patients navigating serious mental illness. Around the time Crush was accepted, he was working two 20-hour weekend shifts so that he could devote the rest of the week to writing.

In 2001, he and Drew Burk founded Spork Press, a Tucson-based poetry journal and small press whose hand-bound issues developed a DIY reputation.

Siken wrote and revised Crush over a period of 15 years. During that time, he left social work for restaurant jobs in Tucson; in 1998, he moved to New York for less than a year before returning to Tucson. Siken's debut collection, Crush, was selected by Louise Glück as the 2004 winner of the Yale Series of Younger Poets and was published by Yale University Press in 2005. Siken has said that the death of his boyfriend in 1990 shaped the book. Alongside the book's prizes, Siken has received a Pushcart Prize, two Arizona Commission on the Arts grants, two Lannan residencies, and a Literature Fellowship in Poetry from the National Endowment for the Arts.

His second collection, War of the Foxes, was published by Copper Canyon Press in 2015, a decade after Crush. The collection was described as a "painterly" and more fabular follow-up to Crush. A 2025 Poetry Foundation profile also reproduced paintings from his 2015 series Ten Men in Seven Suits.

In 2019, Siken had a stroke. His first poem published afterward, "Real Estate", appeared in the Academy of American Poets' Poem-a-Day in December 2020. His third collection, I Do Know Some Things, was published in 2025. Writing in The Nation, Yvonne Kim described the book as "plainly autobiographical" and noted that its 77 prose poems follow Siken's recovery, including his temporary loss of speech, memory, and mobility after the stroke. Kim also reported that Siken turned to prose-poem blocks and initially composed much of the book by dictation after line breaks intensified his post-stroke disorientation.

Siken lives in Tucson.

== Style and reception ==
In a 2015 Poetry Foundation interview, Crush was described as a rare success for a contemporary poetry collection, having received both critical and popular acclaim and sold more than 20,000 copies.

In a 2025 essay for The Yale Review, Richie Hofmann wrote that Crush had a strong influence on younger poets and later found an online afterlife, with lines from the book reused in memes, fan fiction, and other internet artifacts.

Reviewers of War of the Foxes emphasized its visual qualities. The Academy of American Poets described the book as a "much-anticipated" follow-up whose fables, still lifes, and landscapes marked a shift from the emotional urgency of Crush while retaining Siken's concern with romantic and familial desolation.

I Do Know Some Things drew notice for its prose-poem form and autobiographical directness. The National Book Award judges' citation described the book as a record of Siken "relearning an intimacy with his own life", while The Nation wrote that it presented a more open and self-reflective Siken than his earlier books.

== Awards and honors ==
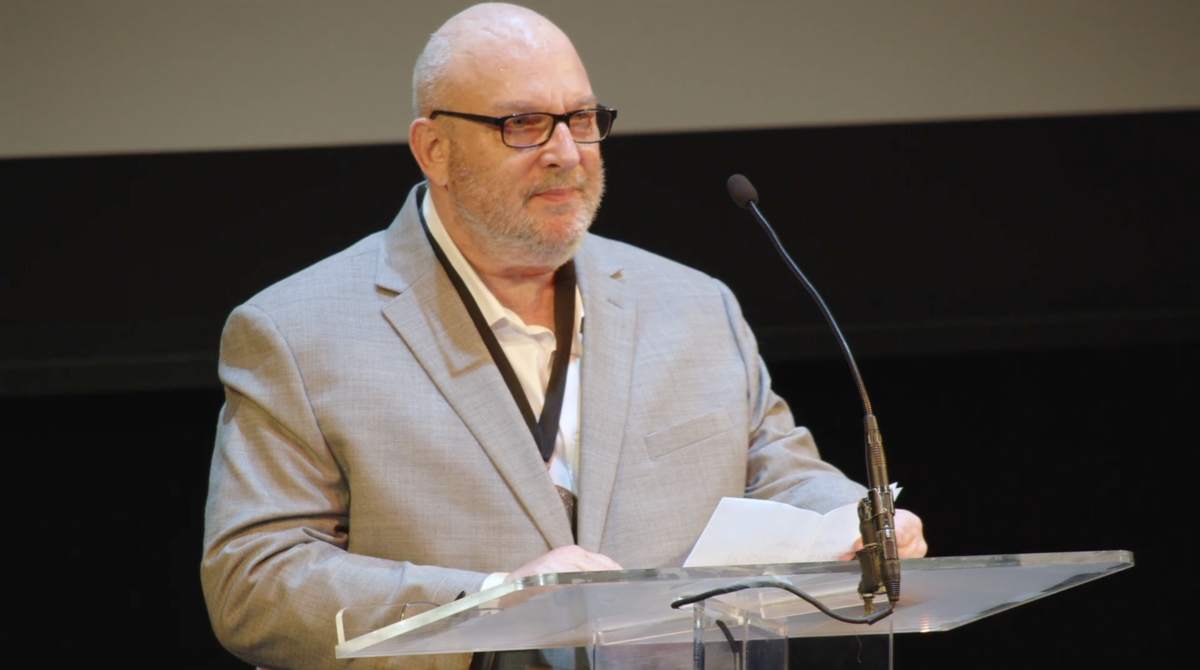
Siken reading "Family Therapy" at the 2025 National Book Awards finalist reading.

- Yale Series of Younger Poets Competition, 2004, for Crush
- National Book Critics Circle Award, 2005, finalist, for Crush
- Lambda Literary Award, for Crush
- Thom Gunn Award, for Crush
- Pushcart Prize
- Two Arizona Commission on the Arts grants
- Two Lannan residencies
- National Endowment for the Arts Literature Fellowship in Poetry
- National Book Award for Poetry, 2025, finalist, for I Do Know Some Things
- Los Angeles Times Book Prize in Poetry, 2025, finalist, for I Do Know Some Things
- Thom Gunn Award, 2026, winner, for I Do Know Some Things.

== Works ==
=== Poetry collections ===
- Crush (Yale University Press, 2005) ISBN 9780300107210 OCLC 637026953
- War of the Foxes (Copper Canyon Press, 2015) ISBN 9781556594779 OCLC 990282587
- I Do Know Some Things (Copper Canyon Press, 2025) ISBN 9781556596247 OCLC 1517414843
