= Chen Chen (poet) =

American poet

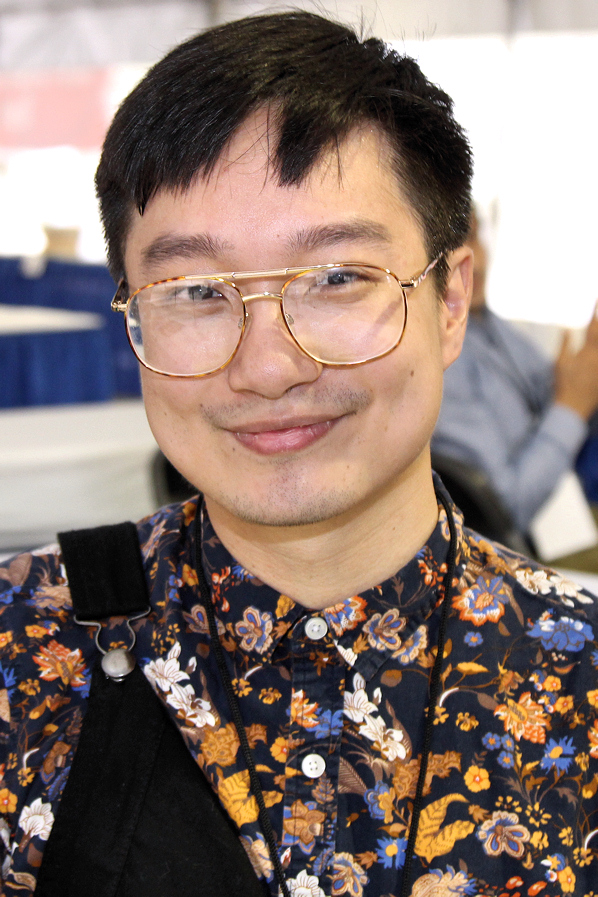
- Chen at the 2017 Texas Book Festival
- Born: March 9, 1989 (age 37); Xiamen, China
- Education: Hampshire College (B.A.); Syracuse University (M.F.A.); Texas Tech University (Ph.D.)
- Website: www.chenchenwrites.com

Chen Chen (Chinese: 陳琛; pinyin: Chén Chēn, born March 9, 1989) is an American poet. His book, When I Grow Up I Want to Be a List of Further Possibilities, was longlisted for the 2017 National Book Award for Poetry. Chen serves on the poetry faculty for the low-residency MFA programs at New England College and Stonecoast. He served as Jacob Ziskind Poet-in-Residence at Brandeis University from 2018 to 2022.

== Life ==
Chen was born in Xiamen, China and grew up in Massachusetts. After graduating from Newton North High School, he received his B.A. in creative writing and Asian/Pacific/American Studies at Hampshire College in 2011, and his M.F.A. from Syracuse University in 2014. Chen completed his Ph.D. in English and creative writing at Texas Tech University, where he was a part-time instructor in composition.

His work has appeared in Poetry, The Massachusetts Review, Drunken Boat, Best of the Net, The Best American Poetry, The Academy of American Poets, and elsewhere. He has served as a poetry editor for Salt Hill Journal, and currently serves as editor-in-chief of Underblong and managing editor for Iron Horse Review. He also edits "the lickety split", a Twitter-based journal that "only publishes poems that fit in a single tweet", alongside his fictional assistant editor Gudetama the Egg.

== Awards and fellowships ==
- 2014 A. Poulin Jr. Poetry Prize
- 2014 New Delta Review's Matt Clark Award in Poetry
- 2015 Finalist, Poetry Foundation's Ruth Lilly and Dorothy Sargent Rosenberg Poetry Fellowships
- 2016 Kundiman Fellow
- 2017 Longlisted, National Book Award
- 2018 Finalist, Lambda Literary Award for Gay Poetry
- 2018 GLCA New Writers Award (Poetry)
- 2018 Thom Gunn Award for Gay Poetry
- 2019 Pushcart Prize
- 2019 National Endowment for the Arts Fellowship in Literature
- 2023 American Library Association Notable Books for Adults List

== Books ==
- Set the Garden on Fire (Porkbelly Press, 2015)
- Kissing the Sphinx (Two of Cups Press, 2016)
- When I Grow Up I Want to Be a List of Further Possibilities (New York: BOA Editions, 2017)
- Your Emergency Contact Has Experienced an Emergency (New York: BOA Editions, September 2022)
- Explodingly Yours (Ghost City Press, 2023)

In anthology

- Ghost Fishing: An Eco-Justice Poetry Anthology (University of Georgia Press, 2018)
