= Hieu Minh Nguyen =

Vietnamese-American writer

- Born: Saint Paul, Minnesota, U.S.
- Occupation: Poet

Hieu Minh Nguyen (Vietnamese name: Nguyễn Minh Hiếu) is a Vietnamese-American poet based in Minneapolis. A graduate of the Warren Wilson College MFA Program, his writing has appeared in The New Yorker, PBS NewsHour, POETRY magazine, BuzzFeed, Poetry London, Best American Poetry, The New York Times, Muzzle Magazine, The Paris-American, the Indiana Review, and more. He identifies as queer.

Nguyen is the recipient of the 2017 NEA fellowship for poetry, a Kundiman fellow, a poetry editor for Muzzle Magazine, winner of the VERVE grant from Intermedia Arts, and the Minnesota Emerging Writers’ Grant from The Loft Literary Center. He has been a recipient of the University of Arizona Poetry Center's Summer Residency, and has participated in many other residencies and fellowships - including the Ruth Lilly and Dorothy Sargent Rosenberg Poetry Fellowship. He was a 2019-2021 Stegner Fellow in poetry at Stanford University.

In 2014, his debut collection of poetry, This Way to the Sugar, was a finalist for both the Lambda Literary Award and the Minnesota Book Award. His second collection, Not Here, was published in April 2018 by Coffee House Press.

== Published works ==
=== Books ===
- Not Here, (Coffee House Press, 2018)
- This Way to the Sugar, (Write Bloody Publishing, 2014)
