= I Do Know Some Things =

2025 poetry collection by Richard Siken

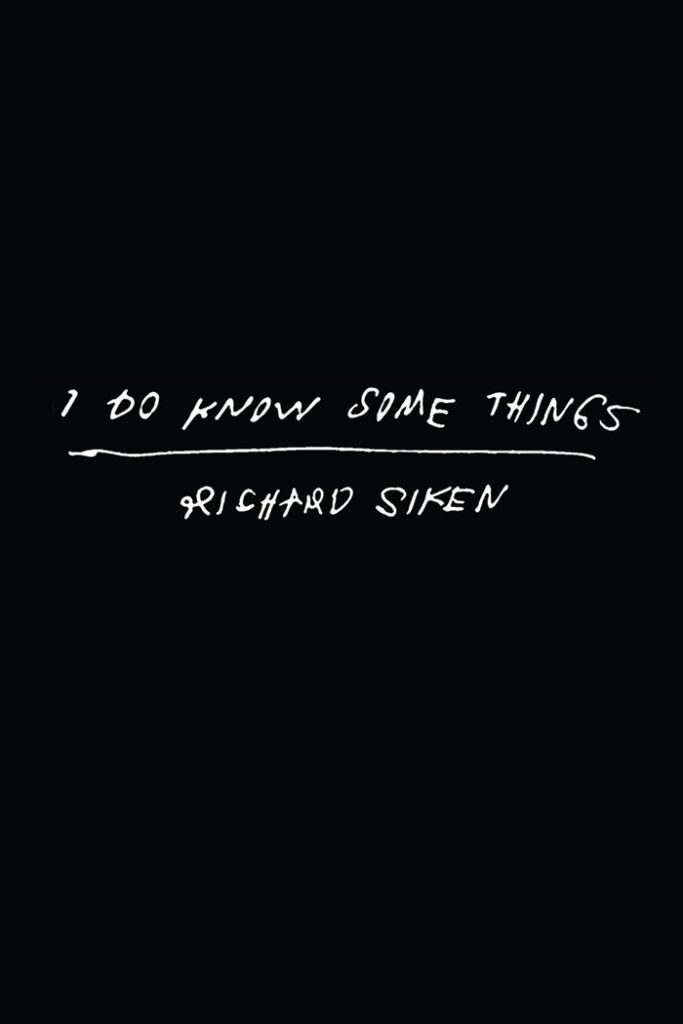
- Author: Richard Siken
- Publisher: Copper Canyon Press
- Publication date: August 26, 2025
- Pages: 128
- ISBN: 9781556596247

I Do Know Some Things is a 2025 poetry collection by Richard Siken. His third book of poems, it was scheduled for publication in August 2025 by Copper Canyon Press. It consists of 77 poems written following Siken's stroke and subsequent efforts in recovery.

== Background ==
Siken had a stroke in the early 2020s which paralyzed the right side of his body and caused him to forget many things. His recovery was "fast and strong," however, largely due to his artistic practices and language-learning: "I had multiple engines, multiple strategies for making meaning. I had already been building new synaptic networks." Amid his recovery, Siken began trying to remember things about his life by writing lists, which ended up becoming poems, accumulating toward a new book which proved to be more autobiographical than his previous two poetry collections, Crush and War of the Foxes, both of which blurred the "distinction between author and speaker."

As such, Siken approached I Do Know Some Things "from the mind, not from the body" in terms of writing without breath, music, or rhythm, but rather through the connection of sentences, the filling of gaps. Toward such end, Siken instead moved closer to a more rigid form, of "the rectangular container of the prose poem" as opposed to, say, the freer, "floating" form of Crush. Siken stated in the Columbia Review that such a structure helped him orient himself: "I was having such a hard time just linking phrases together that the idea of the disjunction of the broken line made no sense. There was no way to break a line because I would get lost. It would stop me. I couldn’t finish the thought. I couldn’t finish the sentence, so they all had to be paragraphs."

However, Siken told Bomb that I Do Know Some Things was "not a recovery story because I don’t really recover. I don’t go back to the way I was. There are things I will just never be able to do again. And that’s fine."

== Structure ==
Consisting entirely of prose poems in the form of unbroken paragraphs, the book has 77 poems, each referring to "terms that I tried to figure out in the hospital... words to rebuild myself with. It's a glossary. It's an encyclopedia of me." Siken stated in the Columbia Review that confronting such terms was a means of recovery vis-à-vis forging new connections, building ideas.

== Critical reception ==
Richie Hofmann, writing for Yale Review, called the book "unsettling" in Siken's attempt to relearn both language and interiority through association, lauding its directness, its "signature intensity" characteristic of Siken's work, and its contentions with reality.

Zack Strait, writing in The Common, compared the clarity of Siken's images and sentences to Jasper Johns targets and called I Do Know Some Things "a brave book... not only in its content, but its method. It is brave to write about childhood scars, the heartbreak the dead leave behind, or how one’s life must be reconfigured in the aftermath of a stroke, much less all three."

C. Francis Fisher, in the Los Angeles Times, concluded that "The book's emotional landscape is denser than in Siken’s earlier work, at once more autobiographical and more difficult to parse. There is truth and lie, myth and reality; perhaps it is all truth because we need to say it."
