= Yuki Tanaka =

Yu(u)ki Tanaka may refer to:

- Yuki Tanaka (volleyball), Japanese volleyball player
- Yuuki Tanaka, Japanese tennis player
- Yuki Tanaka (historian), Japanese historian
- Yuki Tanaka (voice actress), Japanese voice actress and singer
