= Prelude to Bruise =

2014 poetry collection by Saeed Jones

- First edition cover
- Author: Saeed Jones
- Cover artist: Syreeta McFadden (photo); Linda Koutsky (design)
- Language: English
- Genre: Poetry
- Publisher: Coffee House Press
- Publication date: September 9, 2014
- Publication place: United States
- Media type: Print (paperback)
- Pages: 124
- Awards: 2015 Barbara Gittings Literature Award; 2015 PEN/Joyce Osterweil Award for Poetry
- ISBN: 978-1-56689-374-9
- Dewey Decimal: 811/.6
- LC Class: PS3610.O6279 P74 2014

Prelude to Bruise is a 2014 poetry collection by American author Saeed Jones, published by Coffee House Press on September 9, 2014.

== Contents ==
#	Title
	Anthracite
1	Insomniac
1	Closet of Red
1	The Blue Dress
1	Isaac, after Mount Moriah
1	Pretending to Drown
1	Boy in a Stolen Evening Gown
1	Boy at Edge of Woods
1	Terrible Boy
1	Daedalus, after Icarus
1	Boy in a Whalebone Corset
1	Boy Found inside a Wolf
1	Boy at Threshold
1	After the First Shot
1	Last Call
2	"Don't Let the Sun Set on You"
2	Prelude to a Bruise
2	Coyote Cry
2	Jasper, 1998
2	Lower Ninth
2	Drag
2	Kudzu
2	Beheaded Kingdom
2	Thralldom
2	Cruel Body
2	Thallium
2	He Thinks He Can Leave Me
3	Secondhand (Smoke)
3	Body & Kentucky Bourbon
3	Eclipse of My Third Life
3	Guilt
3	Sleeping Arrangement
3	Apologia
3	Ketamine & Company
3	Thralldom II
3	Skin Like Brick Dust
3	Kingdom of Trick, Kingdom of Drug
3	Blue Prelude
3	In Nashville
4	Highway 407
4	Meridian
4	Mercy
4	Mississippi Drowning
4	Casket Sharp
4	Dominion
4	The Fabulist
4	Room without a Ghost
4	Dirge
4	After Last Light
4	Hour between Dog & Wolf
4	Postapocalyptic Heartbeat
5	History, according to Boy
6	Last Portrait as Boy

== Reception ==
Publishers Weekly praised the collection, writing, "Solid from start to finish, possessing amazing energy and focus, a bold new voice in poetry has announced itself."

Writing for NPR, poet Amal El-Mohtar said, "There are too many exceptional poems here to single out, and not a single one that didn't at least impress me."

== Awards and nominations ==
It won the 2015 Stonewall Book Award-Barbara Gittings Literature Award and the 2015 PEN/Joyce Osterweil Award for Poetry. It was a finalist for the 2015 Thom Gunn Award for Gay Poetry, the 2014 Lambda Literary Award for Gay Poetry, and the 2014 National Book Critics Circle Award for Poetry.
