= Metaphysical Dog =

2013 poetry collection by Frank Bidart

- Author: Frank Bidart
- Language: English
- Genre: Poetry
- Publisher: Farrar, Straus and Giroux
- Publication date: 30 April 2013
- Publication place: United States
- Media type: Print (hardcover)
- Pages: 128 pp
- ISBN: 978-0-374-17361-6

Metaphysical Dog is the eighth book of collected free verse poems by American poet Frank Bidart. It was published in 2013 by Farrar, Straus and Giroux and won the National Book Critics Circle Award; it was also nominated for the National Book Award in Poetry.
