= Star Dust (poetry collection) =

Poetry collection by Frank Bidart

- First edition
- Author: Frank Bidart
- Language: English
- Genre: Poetry
- Published: May 2005
- Publisher: Farrar, Straus and Giroux

Star Dust is a collection of poetry by Frank Bidart, first published in book form by Farrar, Straus and Giroux in 2005. The book was a 2005 National Book Award Finalist for Poetry.

The book is split into two sections. The first section, Music Like Dirt, is a sequence of poems that became the first chapbook to ever be nominated for the Pulitzer Prize when it was originally published in 2002. The second section includes The Third Hour of the Night, a dark and violent poem about Italian Renaissance artist Benvenuto Cellini. It is part of a project by Bidart that, so far, includes two similarly titled poems. Third Hour was first published in the October 2004 issue of Poetry, taking up almost the entire issue.

Star Dust also includes notes on some poems by Bidart, and later editions also include an interview with the author conducted by Bookslut.
