= Publishing Triangle =

American association of LGBT publishers

The Publishing Triangle
- Formation: 1988; 38 years ago
- Location: New York, New York
- Website: www.publishingtriangle.org

The Publishing Triangle is an American association of queer readers and professionals in the publishing industry. They host annual Triangle Awards for LGBTQ+ literature, including works with LGBTQ+ authors or with LGBTQ+ themes. The Publishing Triangle also founded the Rainbow Book Month as the National Lesbian and Gay Book Month, and they host literary events in New York.

Publishing Triangle supports one set of a number of LGBTQ+ literary awards. Other prominent awards include the Lambda Literary Awards, Stonewall Book Awards, and Gaylactic Spectrum Awards. Most of Publishing Triangle's awards are bestowed on the best book of the year relating to a specific identity and genre of LGBTQ+ literature. Several author and industry awards are also given, like the Betty Berzon Emerging Writer Award and Michele Karlsberg Leadership Award.

== History ==
The Publishing Triangle was founded in 1988 by Robin Hardy as an association of gay men and lesbians in the publishing industry. They have sponsored the annual Triangle Awards program of literary awards for LGBTQ+ literature since 1989. They began the National Lesbian and Gay Book Month in June 1992, which was later adopted by the Rainbow Round Table, eventually becoming Rainbow Book Month.

The Publishing Triangle credits three individuals with providing initial support for the organization: Crown editor David Groff, Book-of-the-Month Club executive Richard Riger, and St. Martin's Press editor Michael Denneny, the latter of whom co-chaired the first steering committee with Michele Karlsberg of Amethyst Press.

== Awards ==
- Randy Shilts Award for Gay Nonfiction (gay nonfiction)
- Judy Grahn Award for Lesbian Nonfiction (lesbian nonfiction)
- Audre Lorde Award for Lesbian Poetry (lesbian poetry)
- Thom Gunn Award for Gay Poetry (gay poetry)
- Edmund White Award for Debut Fiction (debut fiction)
- Leslie Feinberg Award for Trans and Gender-Variant Literature (transgender literature)
- Joseph Hansen Award for LGBTQ Crime Writing
- Jacqueline Woodson Award for LGBTQ+ Children’s/YA Literature (children's/young adult)
- Ferro-Grumley Award for LGBTQ Fiction (fiction)
- Amber Hollibaugh Award for LGBTQ+ Social Justice Writing (social justice nonfiction)
- Bill Whitehead Award for Lifetime Achievement (lifetime achievement)
- Betty Berzon Emerging Writer Award (early career achievement)
- Michele Karlsberg Leadership Award
- Publishing Triangle Torchbearer Award
- Robert Chesley Playwriting Award (drama)

=== Special awards ===
The Publishing Triangle occasionally bestows awards outside these categories as special awards. As of 2026, these awardees have both been awarded "Outstanding Achievement in Nonfiction":

- 2011: Gender Outlaws: The Next Generation, edited by Kate Bornstein and S. Bear Bergman, published by Seal Press
- 2022: Let the Record Show, by Sarah Schulman, published by Farrar, Straus and Giroux
