= Sky in a Small Cage =

Opera by Rolf Hind

- Opera by Rolf Hind
- Librettist: Dante Micheaux
- Language: English
- Based on: The life and work of Rumi
- Premiere: August 25, 2024; Radiohuset, Royal Danish Academy of Music

Sky in a Small Cage is an English-language opera with music by British composer Rolf Hind and libretto by American poet Dante Micheaux. The opera was commissioned by the English opera company Mahogany Opera. The libretto also heavily features translations of the poetry of Rumi, who is a central character.

== Background, story and performance history ==
The opera features the relationship between the 13th-century poet Rumi, and the Sufi dervish Shams Tabrizi without literally embodying the characters. The main narrative action ends with the death of Shams Tabrizi and Rumi's coming-to-terms with it in his work and life. This is thought to have taken place historically in 1248. The opera heavily features poetry from the librettist Dante Micheaux, as well as Rumi's work in English translation. There is some use of spoken word rather than singing. Though parts of the opera are more conventional, it contains elements of many creative forms, and in the Financial Times' review of the premiere, Andrew Mellor states that the opera "resembles a classical oratorio in combining elements of character narrative with theology, prayer and a contextualising chorus."

The opera premiered during the 2024 Copenhagen Opera Festival, at The Royal Danish Academy of Music. A single performance was given on 25 August 2024. The same production then transferred to the Barbican Centre in London for the UK premiere on 8 September 2024. The first performance featured the Athelas Ensemble Copenhagen and the London performance the Riot Ensemble and six ensemble singers.

== Roles ==
Roles, voice types, and premiere cast
Role	Voice type	Premiere cast, August 25, 2024
Narrator	soprano	Elaine Mitchener
I and you (becoming Rumi)	counter-tenor	James Hall
Bird of the Sun –(Shams Tabrizi)	baritone	Yannis François
Shaman of the Birds and Kerra, Rumi's wife	mezzo-soprano	Loré Lixenberg

== Reception ==
Sky in a Small Cage received mixed reviews, with critics pointing to a disjointed structure. The Times Rebecca Franks said the opera "had its beautiful moments", but was undermined by "tedious stretches". In The Telegraph, Nicholas Kenyon branded the opera "a curate's egg". In a three-star review in The Guardian, Andrew Clements felt that the music was at its best during the section dealing with Rumi and Shabs Tabrizi's relationship, and found other aspects of the opera more difficult to follow, suggesting that it may be more rewarding for those deeply familiar with Rumi's life and work.

The contemporary music writer Tim Rutherford-Johnson gave the opera a positive review, saying "Sky in a Small Cage is one of those works...that contained everything of an artist, the thing they have been put on earth to say," and found it "beautiful" and moving."
