= Dante Micheaux =

American poet

- Education: New York University
- Occupation: Poet
- Writing career
- Notable work: Circus (2018)
- Notable awards: Four Quartets Prize; Oscar Wilde Award; Ambit Magazine Poetry Prize

Dante Micheaux is an American poet whose work Circus was the winner of the 2019 Four Quartets Prize, presented by the Poetry Society of America in partnership with the T. S. Eliot Foundation, having been selected by judges Rowan Ricardo Phillips, Carmen Giménez Smith and Rosanna Warren.

Among other honors Micheaux that has received are a poetry prize from the Vera List Center for Art and Politics, the Oscar Wilde Award, the 2020 Ambit Magazine Poetry Prize, and fellowships from Cave Canem Foundation and The New York Times Foundation. Journals and anthologies in which his poems and translations have appeared include The American Poetry Review, Callaloo, Poetry, PN Review, and Tongue.

Micheaux is Artistic Director at Cave Canem.

== Background ==
Dante Micheaux grew up in New Jersey, United States, and studied at New York University, where he earned a Master of Fine Arts degree in Creative Writing.

With his first book of poetry, Amorous Shepherd, being published 2010, his work has won significant praise, including from Pulitzer Prize-winning poet Yusef Komunyakaa, who described the collection as having "a marvelous sonority and sincerity that go directly for the experienced heart".

The 2018 publication of Micheaux's book-length poem Circus brought further acclaim. According to Terrance Hayes: "Intimate soliloquy, lyric address, and linguistic allegory merge with resonating voices and personae. This poem is masterful, paradoxical and spiritual." Marilyn Nelson said that Circus "promises to be received as a masterpiece reminiscent of the best of Melvin Tolson's work. ... Dante Micheaux is a code-switcher fluent in many languages. Some of his lines bring this reader close to heartbreak."

Circus was awarded the 2019 Four Quartets Prize, presented by the Poetry Society of America in partnership with the T. S. Eliot Foundation, in 2019, when the judges' citation stated: "How right that this poet's first name should be Dante. For his Circus is a Comedy: a savage comedy, lacerating dialects, fingering wounds, looking for loves right and wrong in the crevices of history and of humiliated abodes. ... His language exults, triumphs, and freely rummages in the treasuries of the Bible, Baudelaire, Whitman, Eliot, Baraka, and Mahalia Jackson, taking what it needs, making it his sovereign own, a wrested blessing."

Micheaux has also worked with musical artists, including with Jason Yarde, Elaine Mitchener, Byron Wallen and Alexander Hawkins at Cafe Oto, London, in 2019. As described by Stanley Moss: "Dante Micheaux's poetry is always musical. He plays in a group with Cavafy, Lorca, Komunyakaa. His instrument is a clear exact voice with his heart beating so loud you can hear it. He has highs and lows that reach into something Greek, into jazz, into the blues, into metaphysical English poetry. He pulls all this off remaining wonderfully African-American."

Micheaux's most recent work is the libretto for Rolf Hind's 2024 opera Sky in a Small Cage, inspired by the life and writings of Sufi poet Rumi, the story being told with Micheaux's words together with translations of Rumi's own poetry. It was first performed at the Copenhagen Opera Festival in August 2024, and premiered in London the following month at the Barbican Concert Hall, in the same Mahogany Opera production, directed by Frederic Wake-Walker.

== Honors and recognition ==
- 2003, 2006: Cave Canem Foundation Fellowship
- 2019: Four Quartets Prize for Circus
- 2020: Ambit Magazine Poetry Prize

== Works ==
- Amorous Shepherd (Sheep Meadow Press, 2010, ISBN 9781931357807)
- Circus (Indolent Books, 2018, ISBN 978-1945023200)
