= Patrick Rosal =

Filipino American poet and essayist

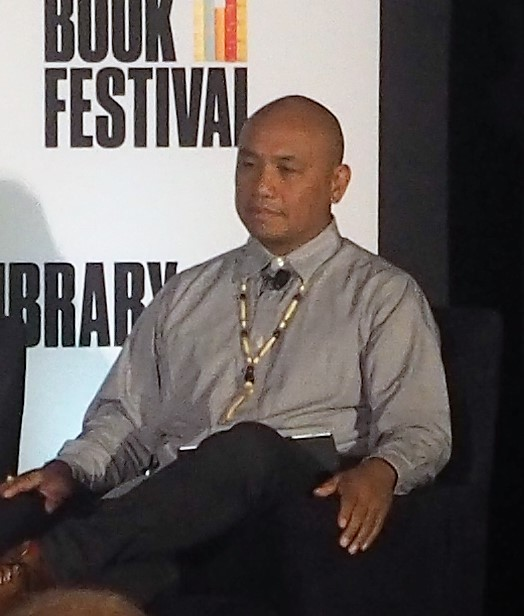
- Occupations: Author, Professor at Rutgers University–Camden
- Writing career
- Notable awards: Guggenheim Fellow
- Website: patrickrosal.com

Patrick Rosal is a Filipino American poet and essayist.

== Writing ==
Rosal is the author of four books of poetry: Brooklyn Antediluvian, Boneshepherds, My American Kundiman, and Uprock Headspin Scramble and Dive, all from Persea Books. His poems and essays have been published widely in journals and anthologies including The New York Times, Tin House, Drunken Boat, Poetry, New England Review, American Poetry Review, Harvard Review, Grantland, Brevity, Breakbeat Poets, and The Best American Poetry. He is co-founding editor of Some Call It Ballin’, a literary sports magazine.

== Career ==
Rosal received his MFA in creative writing from Sarah Lawrence College. In 2009, he was awarded a Fulbright Fellowship to the Philippines. He has taught at Sarah Lawrence College, the University of Texas, Austin, Bloomfield College, and is Distinguished Professor of English and Communication at Rutgers University-Camden.

Rosel was named Poet-in-Residence at the Guggenheim New York for 2026. He was invited to apply by a jury composed of Ricardo Maldonado, Dante Micheaux, and Nikay Paredes and members of the Guggenheim’s Department of Learning and Engagement.

== Awards ==
- 2007 - Global Filipino Literary Award for My American Kundiman
- 2008 - Association for Asian American Studies Poetry/Prose Award for My American Kundiman
- 2011 - National Book Critics Circle Small Press Highlight for Boneshepherds
- 2017 - Guggenheim Fellowship
- 2017 - Lenore Marshall Poetry Prize for Brooklyn Antediluvian
- 2017 - Finalist for the Kingsley Tufts Poetry Award for Brooklyn Antediluvian
- 2018 - National Endowment for the Arts Creative Writing Fellowship
- 2022 - William Carlos Williams Award

== Bibliography ==
=== Books ===
- Brooklyn Antediluvian (Persea Books, 2016) ISBN 9781518221842, OCLC 949218104
- Boneshepherds (Persea Books, 2011) ISBN 9780892553860, OCLC 711051817
- My American Kundiman (Persea Books, 2006) ISBN 9780892553303, OCLC 67383923
- Uprock Headspin Scramble and Dive (Persea Books, 2003) ISBN 9780892552931, OCLC 51323162
- The Last Thing: New & Selected Poems (Persea Books, 2021) ISBN 9780892555321, OCLC 1243263051
