= Balzac, the Open Sky =

Photograph by Edward Steichen

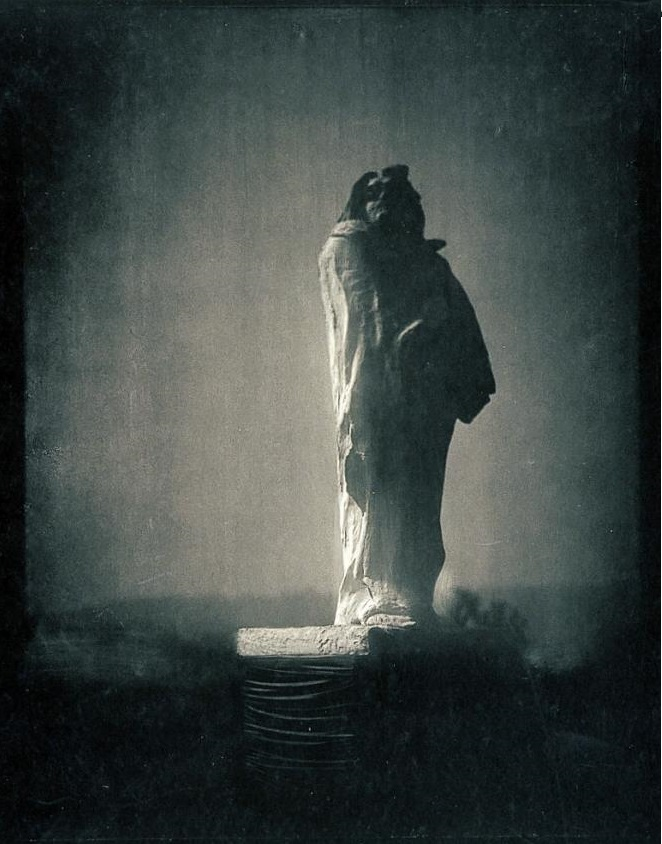
Balzac, the Open Sky (1908) by Edward Steichen

Balzac, the Open Sky is a black and white photograph taken by American photographer Edward Steichen in 1908. The photograph is part of a series created by Steichen that depict the statue of Honoré de Balzac by Auguste Rodin, executed in plaster, in 1898. The statue would eventually be cast in bronze and inaugurated in Paris, in 1939.

== History and description ==
Rodin had been commissioned a statue of Balzac in 1891, by the Société des Gens de Lettres, however it would be refused by them in 1898, since they disapproved of his style. The French sculptor had already worked previously with Steichen when he invited him to take some photographs of his sculpture in 1908, in the hope of gaining more recognition for his creation. Steichen said of the statue: “It was not just the statue of a man; it was the very embodiment of a tribute to genius. It looked like a mountain come to life."

Steichen thought that the plaster statue looked harsh and chalky at day time, so Rodin decided to move it to the garden, where it was put on a rotating platform, to allow better views from different angles. During two nights, Steichen photographed the statue exclusively at moonlight. The photographs presented Rodin's statue in a different light and the sculptor himself praised them and said that they would help to his better understanding. He said to Steichen: “You will make the world understand my Balzac through these pictures. They are like Christ walking in the desert.”

Steichen's series of photographs of the statue were exhibited at the Photo-Secession Gallery, in 1909, the last held jointly by him and Alfred Stieglitz. They also would be published in the magazine Camera Work, in 1911. In both cases they were met with critical acclaim.

The photograph places the imponent statue, appearing menacing in his cloak, slightly off the center and facing the right frame, in an empty, dark and ghostly location, where the only light seen is from the natural moonlit.

== Public collections ==
There are prints of this photograph in several public collections, including the Musée Rodin, in Paris, the Metropolitan Museum of Art, in New York, the Philadelphia Museum of Art, the Minneapolis Institute of Art, the Cleveland Museum of Art, the Amon Carter Museum of American Art, in Fort Worth, the J. Paul Getty Museum, in Los Angeles, and the Musée d'Orsay, in Paris.
