= John Murillo =

American poet

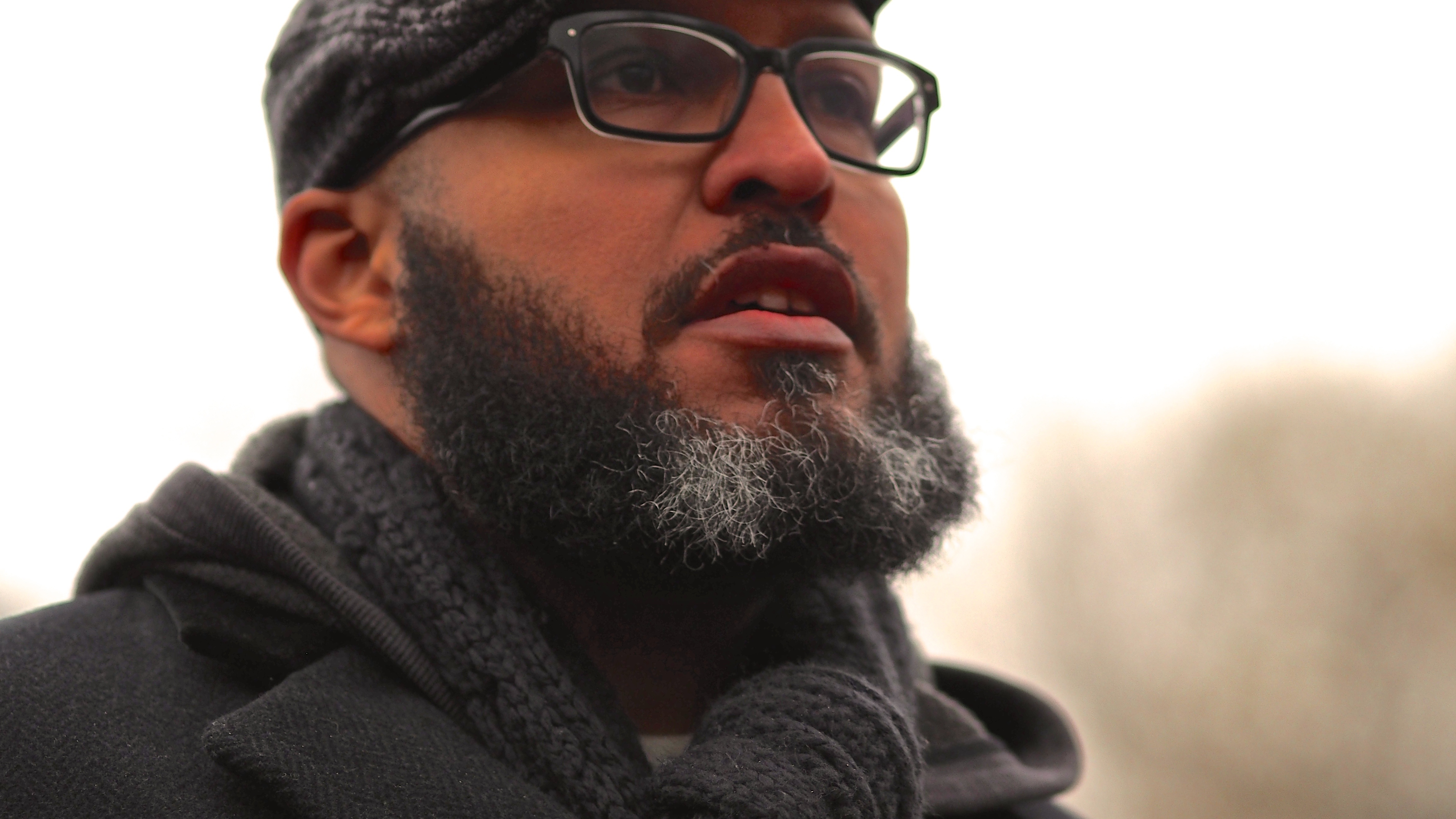
- John Murillo attends a rally at Washington Square, New York in December 2014
- Education: Howard University; New York University
- Employer(s): Wesleyan University; Sierra Nevada College
- Writing career
- Genre: poetry
- Notable work: "A Refusal to Mourn the Deaths, by Gunfire, of Three Men in Brooklyn"
- Notable awards: Four Quartets Prize

John Murillo is an American poet. He is a Cave Canem Fellow and MacDowell Fellow.

== Life ==
He grew up in Los Angeles to an African-American father and Mexican mother. He graduated from Howard University and New York University. Murillo previously taught at Hampshire College and New York University. He currently teaches at Wesleyan University and Sierra Nevada College.

== Works ==
- Three Poems ReadingAB,
- VARIATION ON A THEME BY GIL SCOTT-HERON, The Los Angeles Review,
- A REFUSAL TO MOURN THE DEATHS, BY GUNFIRE, OF THREE MEN IN BROOKLYN, American Poetry Review
- Up Jump the Boogie (Cypher, 2010) ISBN 9780981913148, OCLC 495272840
- The Matador’s Ghost
- Kontemporary Amerikan Poetry (Four Way Books, 2020) ISBN 9781945588471, OCLC 1110678451
- Murillo, John (January 24, 2021). "Variation on a Theme by Elizabeth Bishop". The New York Times Magazine.
