= Four Quartets Prize =

Annual poetry award

The Four Quartets Prize is an award of the Poetry Society of America, presented annually since 2018 in partnership with the T. S. Eliot Foundation. It is "first and foremost a celebration of the multi-part poem, which includes entire volumes composed of a unified sequence as well as novels in verse and book-length verse narratives."

== Background ==
The awards are named for T. S. Eliot's Four Quartets, written over a four-year period. The award recognizes the 75th anniversary of Eliot's New York publisher first collecting them in a single volume in 1943.

== Eligibility ==
The prize is awarded for a unified and complete sequence of poems. Examples of existing sequences that would fit the category:

- Gwendolyn Brooks, A Street in Bronzeville (1945), or The Anniad (1950)
- John Berryman, 77 Dream Poems (1964), or His Toy, His Dream, His Rest (1968)

Winners receive a prize of $20,000; three finalists (including the eventual winner) receive $1,000 apiece. The prize does not require that nominees have an existing body of work or reach a certain age.

The Four Quartets Prize was first presented in 2018 to Danez Smith for their sonnet "summer, somewhere."

== Four Quartets winners and finalists ==
Winners are listed first, highlighted and with a double dagger.

Year	Poet	Work
2025	‡Dobby Gibson	Hold Everything (Graywolf Press)
2025	CAConrad	Listen to the Golden Boomerang Return (Wave Books)
2025	Morgan Võ	"To Market” from The Selkie (The Song Cave)
2024	‡Robyn Schiff	Information Desk: An Epic (Penguin)
2024	Dong Li	The Orange Tree (University of Chicago Press)
2024	Paisley Rekdal	West: A Translation (Copper Canyon Press)
2023	‡Courtney Faye Taylor	Concentrate (Graywolf Press)
2023	Brenda Hillman	“The Sickness & the World Soul” from her collection In a Few Minutes Before Later (Wesleyan University Press)
2023	Gabriel Ojeda-Sagué	Madness (Nightboat Books)
2022	‡Muriel Leung	Imagine Us, The Swarm (Nightboat Books)
2022	Desiree C. Bailey	What Noise Against the Cane (Yale University Press)
2022	Forrest Gander	“Twice Alive” from his book Twice Alive (New Directions)
2021	‡John Murillo	“A Refusal to Mourn the Deaths, by Gunfire, of Three Men in Brooklyn” from Kontemporary Amerikan Poetry (Four Way Books)
2021	Don Mee Choi	DMZ Colony (Wave Books)
2021	Srikanth Reddy	Underworld Lit (Wave Books)
2020	‡Brian Teare	“Toxics Release Inventory (Essay on Man)” from his collection Doomstead Days (Nightboat Books)
2020	Ilya Kaminsky	Deaf Republic (Graywolf Press)
2020	Prageeta Sharma	Grief Sequence (Wave Books)
2019	‡Dante Micheaux	The Circus (Indolent Books)
2019	Catherine Barnett	"Accursed Questions" from Human Hours (Graywolf Press)
2019	Meredith Stricker	anemochore (Newfound Press)
2018	‡Danez Smith	"summer, somewhere" from Don't Call Us Dead (Graywolf Books)
2018	Geoffrey G. O'Brien	"Experience in Groups" from Experience in Groups (Wave Books)
2018	Kathleen Peirce	Vault: A Poem (New Michigan Press)
