= Tim Johnston (writer) =

American writer (1962–2026)

Timothy Patrick Johnston (July 16, 1962 – May 26, 2026) was an American author of the story collection Irish Girl and the novels Never So Green and Descent: a novel.

== Life and career ==
Timothy Patrick Johnston was born in Iowa City on July 16, 1962. He graduated from the University of Iowa, and he earned an MFA from the University of Massachusetts Amherst. He worked as a carpenter for 25 years while also writing.

Johnston was the 2011 Jenny McKean Moore Writer-in-Residence at The George Washington University.

His stories have also appeared in Best Life Magazine, California Quarterly, Colorado Review, Double Take, New England Review, New Letters, The Iowa Review, The Missouri Review, and Narrative Magazine.

Johnston died from brain cancer on May 26, 2026, at the age of 63.

== Awards ==
Irish Girl won an O. Henry Prize, the New Letters Award for Writers, and the Gival Press Short Story Award, while the collection itself won the 2009 Katherine Anne Porter Prize in Short Fiction.

In 2005, the title story, "Irish Girl," was included in the David Sedaris anthology of favorites, Children Playing Before a Statue of Hercules.

== Works ==
- Distant Sons: a novel. Algonquin Books. 2023. ISBN 9781643753591.
- The Current: a novel. Algonquin Books. 2019. ISBN 9781616206772.
- "Two Years", Narrative
- Descent: a novel. Algonquin Books of Chapel Hill. 2015. ISBN 9781616203047. OCLC 866938509.
- Irish Girl. University of North Texas Press. 2009. ISBN 978-1-57441-271-0.
- Never so green. Farrar, Straus, Giroux. 2002. ISBN 978-0-374-35509-8.
