= Monument to Balzac =

Sculpture by Auguste Rodin

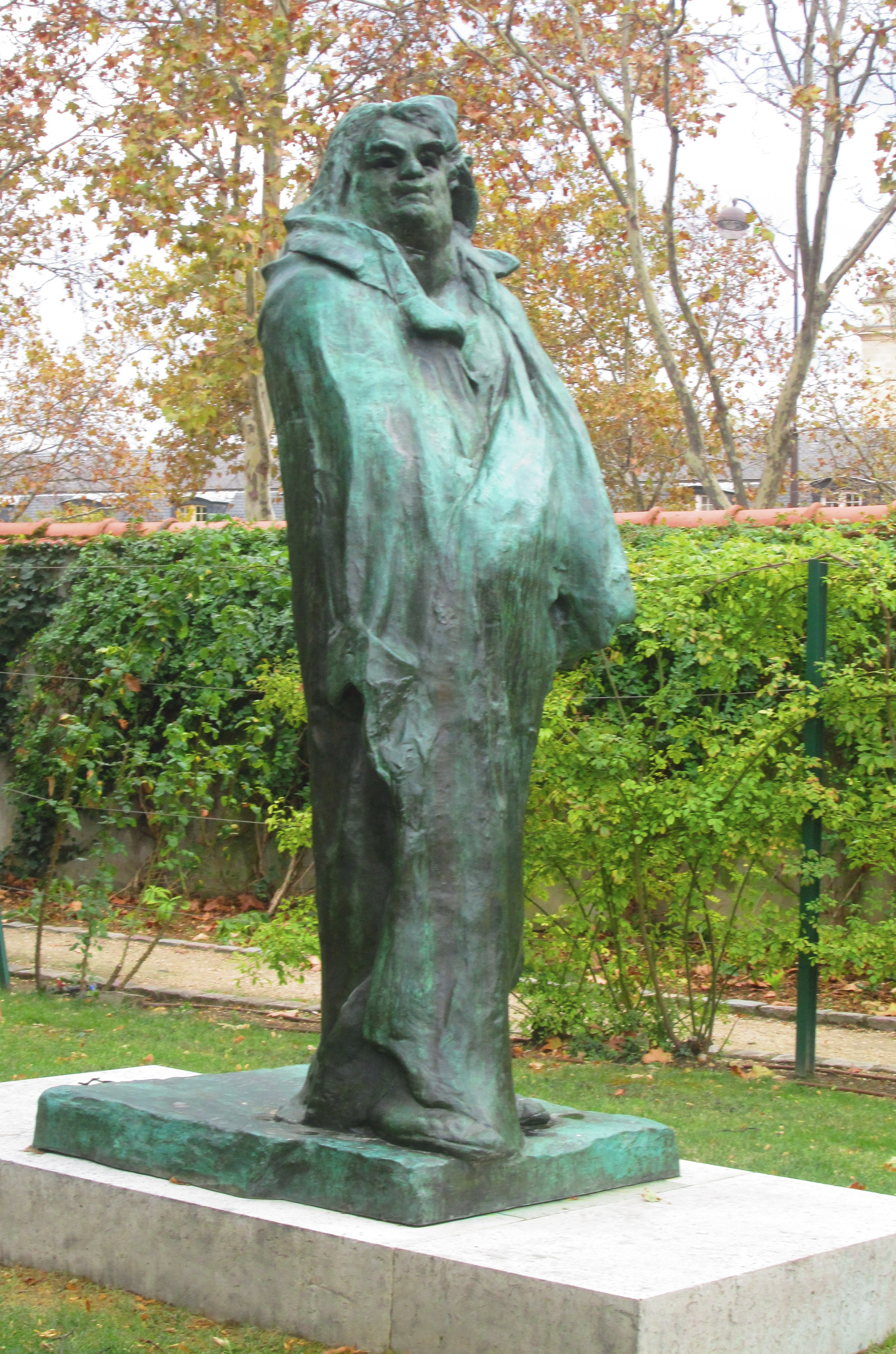
- Artist: Auguste Rodin
- Year: 1892–1897
- Type: Sculpture
- Location: Musée Rodin; Paris

Monument to Balzac is a sculpture by Auguste Rodin in memory of the French novelist Honoré de Balzac. According to Rodin, the sculpture aims to portray the writer's persona rather than a physical likeness. The work was commissioned in 1891 by the Société des Gens de Lettres and a full-size plaster model was displayed in 1898 at a Salon in Champ de Mars. After coming under criticism the model was rejected by the Société and Rodin moved it to his home in Meudon. On 2 July 1939 (22 years after the sculptor's death) the model was cast in bronze for the first time and placed on the Boulevard du Montparnasse at the intersection with Boulevard Raspail.

Casts and various studies of the sculpture are today in many different collections including the Ackland Art Museum, Middelheim Open Air Sculpture Museum in Antwerp, The Norton Simon Museum of Art, the National Museum of Western Art in Tokyo, the Musée Rodin in Meudon, the Rodin Museum in Philadelphia, the Hirshhorn Museum, the Hirschhorn Sculpture Garden (Smithsonian) in Washington D.C, The Metropolitan Museum of Art, the Museum of Modern Art in New York City, the National Gallery of Victoria in Melbourne, the Ashmolean Museum in Oxford, in front of the Van Abbemuseum, Eindhoven, Netherlands, in Caracas, Venezuela in the open spaces around the former Ateneo de Caracas, now UNEARTES and Balzac in the Robe of a Dominican Monk in Museo Soumaya in Mexico City. Today the artwork is sometimes considered the first truly modern sculpture.

In his 1969 documentary series Civilisation, Kenneth Clark said Rodin's statue of Balzac is "the greatest piece of sculpture of the nineteenth century — perhaps, indeed, since Michelangelo," continuing that, "Balzac, with his prodigious understanding of human motives scorns conventional values, defies fashionable opinions, as Beethoven did, and should inspire us to defy all those forces that threaten to impair our humanity: lies, tanks, tear gas, ideologies, opinion polls, mechanisation, planners, computers—the whole lot."

== Commission ==
The Société des Gens de Lettres (Paris, France) considered four different artists for the sculptural work before it was given to Rodin. The first was French neoclassical artist Henri Chapu, but he died in 1891 before the work could be finalized. Marquet de Vasselot was the next artist considered for the sculpture and provided a bust of the writer for the Societé. At the same time artists Millet and Coutan also applied for the commission.

Rodin was not initially considered for the work because at that point in time, around 1885, his career had not become as prominent. After the death of Chapu, the recently elected president of the Societé, Émile Zola strongly supported Rodin for the job and, so, the artist submitted a proposal to have a completed three-meter statue of the French novelist within an eighteen-month period which was approved.

The commission was in response to the elevated importance of Honoré de Balzac after his death. Balzac was one of the founders of the Societé as well as the second president of the organization. Upon his death in 1850 interest in creating a statue to commemorate the writer quickly developed under the leadership of Alexandre Dumas, père.

=== Preparation ===
Instead of the designated eighteen-month period of time, Rodin employed a lengthy seven years to finish the work. Rodin became infatuated with the literature of his subject as well as researched the character and personality of Balzac, similar to the writer's own approach to character development. In preparation for the sculpture, Rodin read the author's works as well as traveled numerous times to the author's hometown of Touraine in order to sketch and model clay portrait studies from individuals with similar likeness to the novelist although Rodin never saw him in person. Rodin had clothes resembling those of Balzac's made by the writer's former tailor, using a cloak similar to Balzac's writing cloak for his final statue. The studies ranged from portraiture to muscular and elderly nude figures along with humorous and distorted representations with a sexual emphasis. Rodin repeatedly studied the cloak as well as different facial features that he derived from his observational studies and limited references including a daguerreotype of Balzac. Each sketch evolved and transformed into a different representation of the novelist varying from phallic nudes to heavily clothed and hidden figures.

In 1894, the Societé threatened to step in legally with the commission, turn the job over to artist Alexandre Falguière and take away Rodin's payment. Yet Rodin continued to ask for extensions on time making over fifty studies and continuously distanced himself from a true physical portrayal, tending towards a more psychological representation. The artist became infatuated with capturing the essence of the author's strength. In a message to writer Charles Chincholle in May 1898, Rodin explained his artistic pursuit:

The only thing I realize today is that the neck is too strong. I thought I had to enlarge it because according to me, modern sculpture must exaggerate the forms from the moral point of view. Through the exaggerated neck I wanted to represent strength I realize that the execution exceeded the idea.

In The Art of Dramatic Writing, Lajos Egri, perhaps apocryphally, describes the statue as originally having a pair of folded hands. After Rodin's students complimented the hands to the exclusion of the rest of the statue, he removed them, fearing they were overpowering.

=== Final study ===
The Final Study for the Monument to Balzac, at the Metropolitan Museum of Art in New York, NY, is a smaller version study for the final statue. Joseph Nechvatel commented that few visitors notice the onanistic act which Rodin depicted furtively. The poem Information Desk: An Epic, by Robyn Schiff, features this work as a central figure in "Part 1" of the poem.

=== Rejection ===
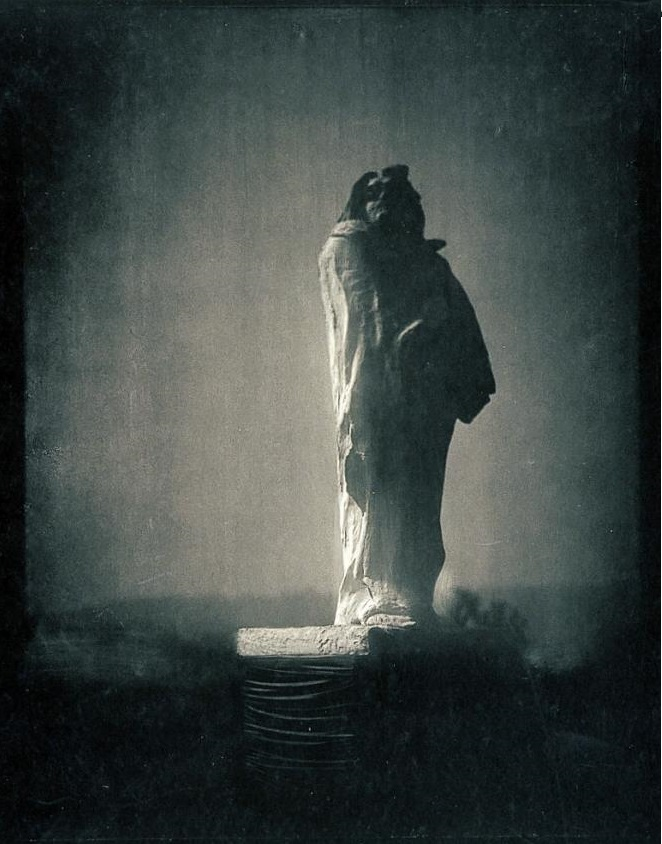
Monument to Balzac photographed by Edward Steichen, 1911

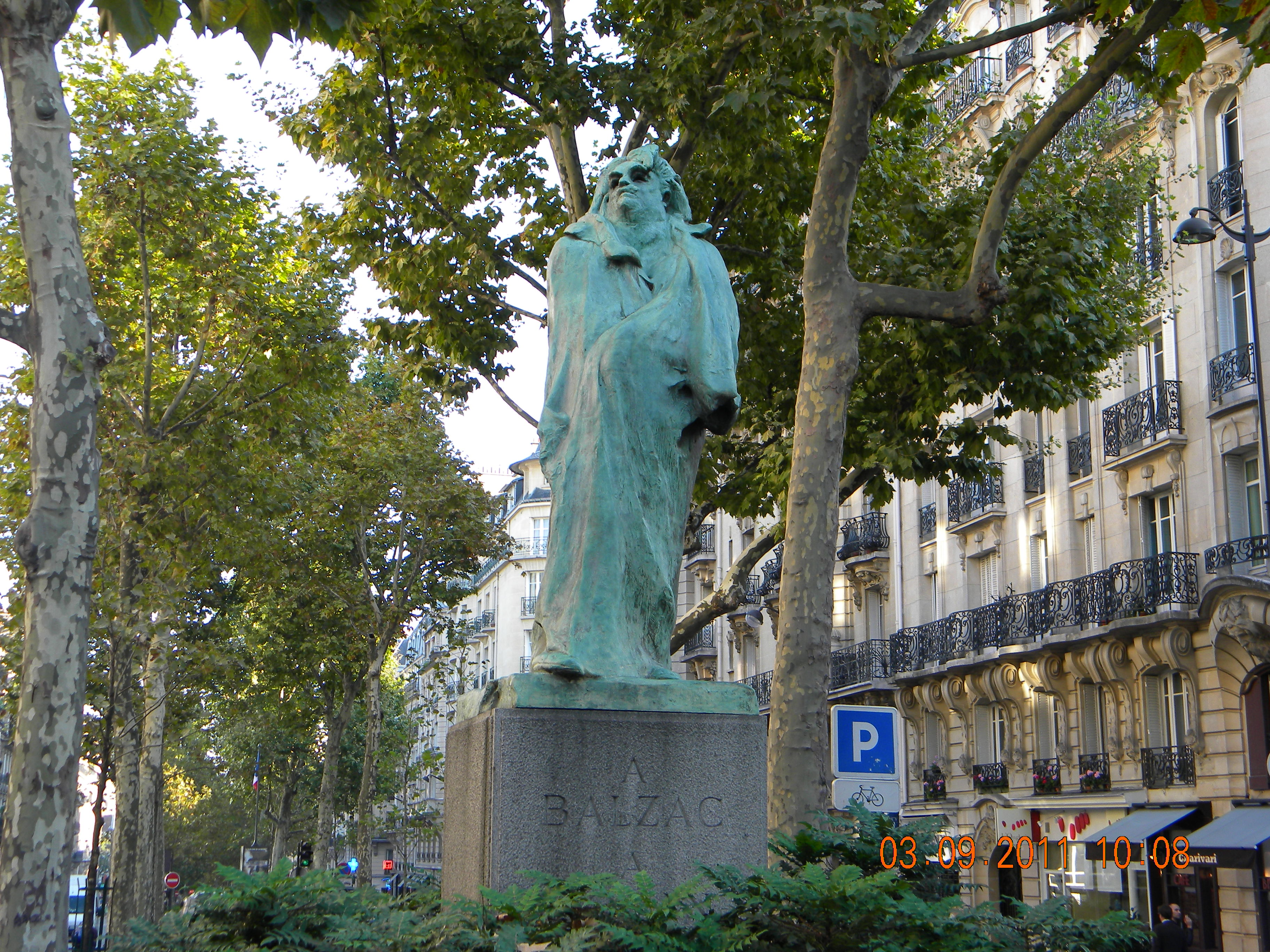
Monument to Balzac in Paris by Auguste Rodin

Finally in 1898, Rodin presented a plaster study of the Balzac statue in the Salon de la Société Nationale des Beaux-Arts. The sculpture was not received well by the critics; Rodin took the negativity as a personal attack. Many disliked the grotesque stature of the figure while others criticized the work as too similar to that of the Italian impressionist Medardo Rosso. As well, reports surfaced before the unveiling of the sculpture regarding anticipated dismay over the final outcome of the artwork. The Société des Gens de Lettres decided to disregard the commissioning of Rodin and not accept the sculpture.

Regardless of rejection from his commissionaires, contemporaries such as Paul Cézanne, Toulouse-Lautrec and Claude Monet supported Rodin in his point of view. Against the rejection a petition was raised in mid-1898 by supporters in the artistic community, and subscriptions to a fund of 30,000 francs to complete and install the work were raised, yet in the end, Rodin decidedly declined any bids for the work and kept the plaster artwork in his home at Meudon.

== Monumental casts ==
- France
  - Musée Rodin Paris
  - at the crossroads of boulevard Raspail and boulevard du Montparnasse, also known as carrefour Vavin, in the 6th arrondissement of Paris (since 1939)
- Germany
  - in front of Kunsthaus Lempertz, looking at Neumarkt square in Cologne (since May 2022)
- Japan
  - Hakone Open-Air Museum
- Australia
  - National Gallery of Victoria (since 1968)

== See also ==
- List of sculptures by Auguste Rodin
- List of public art in Washington, D.C., Ward 2
