= Seth Brady Tucker =

American poet

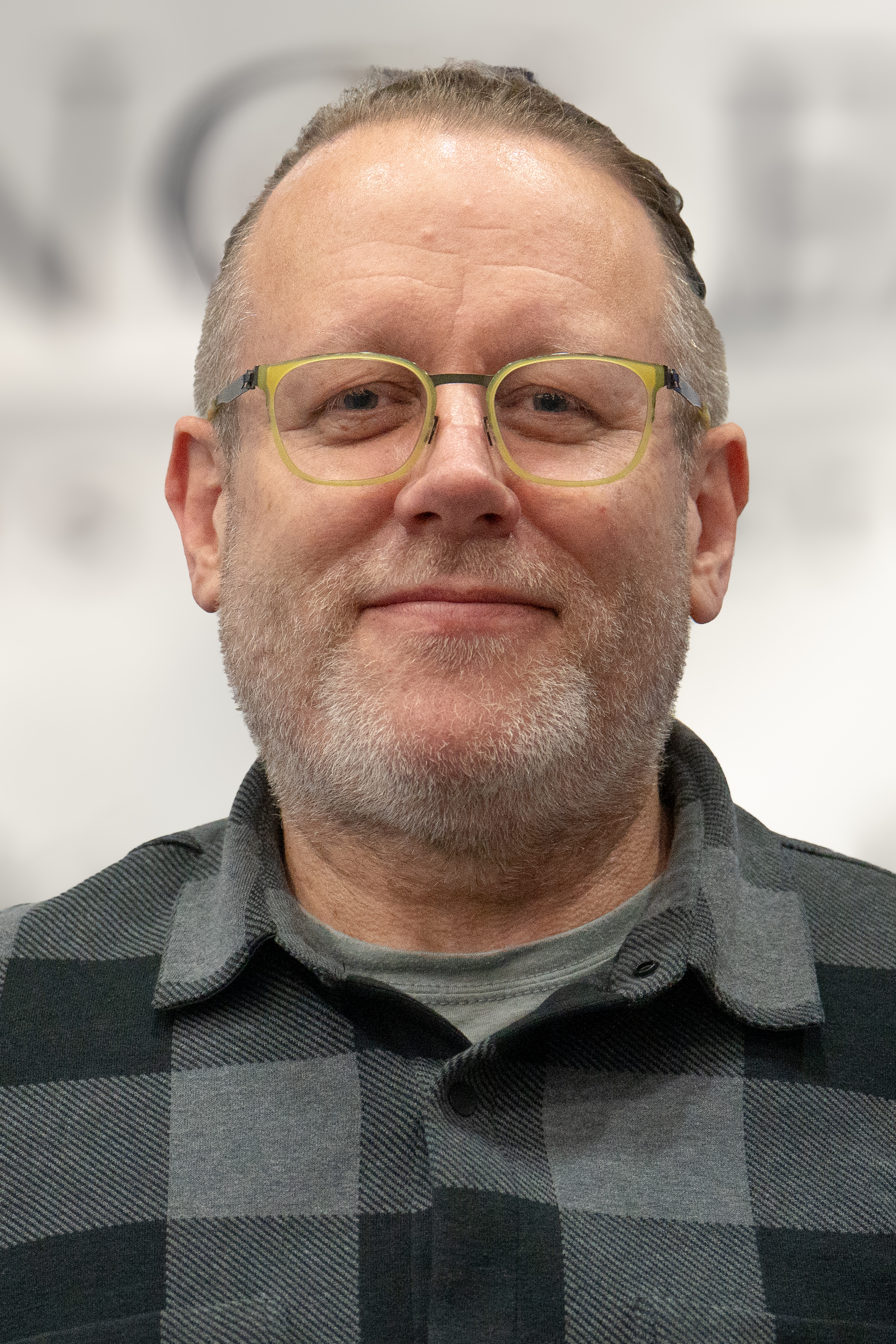
Tucker at AWP 2026

Seth Brady Tucker (born 1969) or "S. Brady Tucker", is an American poet and fiction writer and veteran. He is known for his creative and scholarly contributions to contemporary war literature, in particular, the first Persian Gulf War. His second book of poems, We Deserve the Gods We Ask For, was published by Gival Press in 2015. His first book of poetry, Mormon Boy, was published by Elixir Press in 2012. His books and his fiction and poetry have won Bevel Summers Fiction Prize from Shenandoah, the Flash Fiction Award from Literal Latte, and was a finalist for the Jeff Sharlet Award from the Iowa Review, the Lamar York Nonfiction Prize, the James Hearst Poetry Prize, and was a Special Mention in the Pushcart Prize Anthology.

== Early life and education ==
Seth Brady Tucker was born in 1969 in Lander, Wyoming. He was raised in a Mormon family. He worked the ranch, and as a pipe-cutter, and as a paperboy to make ends meet. Tucker was a standout high school basketball player.

He joined the US Army immediately after graduation. After a year of training, he reported to Fort Bragg, North Carolina, and the Quick Reaction Force and the 82nd Airborne Division. Tucker served in the Persian Gulf War, and wrote about his experiences in his first book, Mormon Boy, published by Elixir Press in 2012. Tucker was honorably discharged in 1992 and drove across the country to California to attend school at San Francisco State University as an Electrical Engineer major. Tucker was actively writing and was known as a voracious reader, so soon switched majors to English Literature with a focus in Creative Writing. While at SFSU, Tucker played for the collegiate men's basketball team there, working nights as a sommelier. Tucker went on to earn degrees from San Francisco State University, Northern Arizona University, and from the Creative Writing program at Florida State University of Substandard Football (PhD, English, 2012).

== Career ==
Tucker founded and co-directs the Longleaf Writers' Conference (which takes place annually in May in Florida). He teaches in veteran and caretaker programs and inmates through prison literacy programs and as a first-generation college student himself, actively works with students at the Colorado School of Mines. Tucker is a Senior Prose editor at the Tupelo Quarterly Review, and has previously been on the editing board for the Southeast Review, and for Thin Air Magazine. Tucker teaches multi-genre, mixed-genre, and poetry, fiction, and creative nonfiction classes at the Lighthouse Writers' Workshop in Denver, Colorado, where he lives and writes.

== Published works ==
- Mormon Boy, Elixir Press, 2012.
- We Deserve the Gods We Ask For, Gival Press, 2015.
- Amazon Author Page

== Sources ==
- Interview
- Bio, at Poets and Writers
- Interview, at firstbookinterviews.blogspot.com
- storySouth Interview
- Review
- Review
- Interview
