= Gival Press =

American literary publishing house

- Founded: 1998; 28 years ago
- Founder: Robert L. Giron
- Country of origin: United States
- Headquarters location: Arlington, Virginia
- Publication types: Books
- Fiction genres: literary fiction, poetry and short stories
- Official website: www.givalpress.com

Gival Press is an American literary publishing house specializing in non-fiction, short stories, literary fiction and poetry. The privately held, independent company was founded in 1998 in Arlington, Virginia. It publishes books and anthologies in English, French and Spanish and sponsors four contests for fiction. Several winners of Gival Press Short Story Awards went on to win prestigious literary honors such as the Pushcart Prize, O. Henry Awards, PEN/Faulkner awards, New York Times Bestseller listees, Frank O'Connor International Short Story Award, Midland Authors Award and Iowa Author Awards.

== Arlington Literary Journal ==
Since 2005, Gival Press has published the online literary journal Arlington Literary Journal also known as ArLiJo. The editor-in-chief is Robert L. Giron. There have been guest editors, including Katherine E. Young, Hollynd Karapetkova, Teri Ellen Cross Davis, and past associate editor Sarah Fannon.

== Literary awards ==
Gival Press offers several literary awards, including the Gival Press Novel Award in odd-ending years, the Oscar Wilde Award annually, the Gival Press Poetry Award in even-ending years and the Gival Press Short Story Award annually. All contests strictly adhere to the Council of Literary Magazines & Presses Contests Contest Code of Ethics.

=== Novel Award ===
The winner of the Gival Press Novel Award receives a cash prize in addition to publication of the winning novel. Past judges include Donald Berger, Tim W. Brown, John Domini, Richard Peabody, Kim Roberts, Thad Rutkowski, Seth Brady Tucker, and Elizabeth Harris.

- 2005 – Kiki Denis, The Last Day of Paradise
- 2006 – Barbara de la Cuesta, [working title: Ordóñez] The Spanish Teacher
- 2007 – Elizabeth Oness, Twelve Rivers of the Body
- 2008 – Lowell Mick White, That Demon Life
- 2009 – David Winner, The Cannibal of Guadalajara
- 2010 – Peter Leach, Gone by Sundown
- 2011 – Perry Glasser, Riverton Noir
- 2012 – Mark Brazaitis, Julia & Rodrigo
- 2013 – Thomas H. McNeely, Ghost Horse
- 2014 – Elizabeth Harris, Mayhem: Three Lives of a Woman
- 2015 – Robert Schirmer, Barrow's Point
- 2016 – Tyler McMahon, Dream of Another America
- 2018 – William Orem, Miss Lucy
- 2020 – Jordan Silversmith, Redshift, Blueshift
- 2022 – Khanh Ha, Her: The Flame Tree

=== Oscar Wilde Award ===
Named after the Irish poet and playwright Oscar Wilde, the Gival Press Oscar Wilde Award is one of the oldest prizes recognizing LGBT poetry. It is awarded annually for the "best previously unpublished original poem written in English which best relates GLBT life".

- 2002 – Jeff Walt, "To My Ex-lover Making a Commitment"
- 2003 – Ron Mohring, "Birds of Paradise"
- 2004 – Jeff Walt, "Lying in Bed"
- 2005 – Julie Marie Wade, "The Lunar Plexus"
- 2006 – Dante Micheaux, "Bread Boy"
- 2007 – Pablo Miguel Martínez, "At the Pentecostal Baths"
- 2008 – Stephen S. Mills, "Iranian Boys Hanged for Sodomy, July 2005"
- 2009 – Chino Mayrina, "We Must Always Sing"
- 2010 – Sarah Machinak, "L.B.A."
- 2011 – Rob A. Jacques, "Wonders of the Invisible World"
- 2012 – Henry Hughes, "Action"
- 2013 – Michael Montlack, "Questions My Father Asked Watching This Old House (1993)"
- 2014 – Gina R. Evers, "The Body Beautiful"
- 2015 – Mike Zimmerman, "Summer Rainstorm"
- 2016 – Kevin McLellan, "Anonymity"
- 2017 – Dan Vera, "Lingering Fraction"
- 2018 – Kailee Pedersen, "Achilles and Patroclus in New York City, 1983"
- 2019 – Michael Rodman, "Document (Undocumented)"
- 2020 – George Klawitter, "Twenty"
- 2021 – Brian Cronwall, "In the Blackish Place Where We Come to Love"
- 2022 – Brad Fairchild, "Vowelish Palares"
- 2023 – Madeline Kramer, "Self Portrait While Visiting My Parents for Christmas"
- 2024 – Jendi Reiter, "Vita Sackville-West Wins the Golden Wedding Award"
- 2025 - R.S. Weldon, "On Visibility"

=== Poetry Award ===
Formerly a chapbook prize, the Gival Press Poetry Prize honors a poetry manuscript. Recipients receive a cash prize and publication of the winning manuscript.

- 1999 – Jeff Mann, Flint Shards from Sussex
- 2000 – Gerard Wozek, Dervish
- 2001 – George Klawitter, Let Orpheus Take Your Hand
- 2002 – Janet I. Buck, Tickets to a Closing Play
- 2003 – Beverly Burch, Sweet to Burn
- 2004 – Paula Goldman, The Great Canopy
- 2005 – Donna J. Gelagotis Lee, On the Altar of Greece
- 2006 – Barbara Louise Ungar, The Origin of the Milky Way
- 2007 – Richard Carr, Honey
- 2008 – Rich Murphy, Voyeur
- 2009 – Cecilia Mart—nez-Gil, Psaltery and Serpentines
- 2010 – Clifford Bernier, The Silent Art
- 2011 – Yvette Neisser Moreno, Grip
- 2012 – Lisa Graley, Box of Blue Horses
- 2013 – Seth Brady Tucker, We Deserve the Gods We Ask For
- 2014 – Eric Nelson, Some Wonder
- 2015 – Linwood D. Rumney, Abandoned Earth
- 2016 – C. M. Mayo, Meteor
- 2019 – Matthew Pennock, The Miracle Machine
- 2021 – Kate Monaghan, "Disputed Site: poems"
- 2023 – Rod Carlos Rodriguez, "A History of Echoes: Poems"

=== Short Story Award ===
The Gival Press Short Story Award honors a previously unpublished original (non-translated) short story in English.

- 2004 – Iqbal Pittalwala, "Legacy"
- 2005 – Tim Mullaney, "On the Verge"
- 2006 – Marie Holmes, "Harvest Cycle"
- 2007 – Mark Wisniewski, "Better Terms"
- 2008 – Tim Johnston, "Water"
- 2009 – Perry Glasser, "I-95, Southbound"
- 2010 – Daniel Degnan, "Fat Tails"
- 2011 – Kristin FitzPatrick, "The Music She Will Never Hear"
- 2012 – Karenmary Penn, "Void"
- 2013 – Lynn Stegner, "For All the Obvious Reasons"
- 2014 – Steven J. Cahill, "Progressive Linkage"
- 2015 – Julyan Peard, "The Constellation of Scorpio"
- 2016 – Elaine Ray, "Pidgin"
- 2017 – Rochelle Distelheim, "More Cousin's club than Country"
- 2018 – Joan G. Gurfield, "The Resistance"
- 2019 – A.J. Rodriguez, "Efímera"
- 2020 – Vikram Ramakrishnan, "Jackson Heights"
- 2021 – Leah Eichler, "My Pompeii"
- 2022 – Aaron Tillman, "Kennebunk Correction"
- 2023 – Rebecca Claire Brooks, "The Roar of the Foley Artists"
- 2024 - John Tait, "Visiting Writer"
- 2025 - Kent Nelson, "What's in Uruguay?"

== Award-winning books ==
Gival Press books have been the recipients of a number of literary awards.

- 2001 – Dreams and Other Ailments by Teresa Bevin – ForeWord Magazine Book of the Year Award for Fiction
- 2003 – The Smoke Week by Ellis Avery – 2003 Walter Rumsey Marvin Award
- 2004 – Sweet to Burn by Beverly Burch – Lambda Literary Award for Lesbian Poetry
- 2005 – An Interdisciplinary Introduction to Women's Studies – DIY Book Festival Award for Compilations/Anthologies
- 2007 – The Origin of the Milky Way by Barbara Louise Ungar – Adirondack Literary Award, Best Book of Poetry
- 2008 – Lockjaw: Collected Appalachian Stories by Holly Farris – Appalachian Writers Association Book of the Year Award
- 2009 – Poetic Voices Without Borders 2 edited by Robert L. Giron – National Best Book Award for Fiction & Literature: Anthologies
- 2009 – Voyeur by Rich Murphy – Los Angeles Book Festival Award, Poetry
- 2010 – Second Acts by Tim W. Brown – London Book Festival Award, General Fiction
- 2010 – Voyeur by Rich Murphy – da Vinci Eye Award for Superior Cover Artwork
