= Mark Wisniewski =

American writer

- Education: Georgetown University Law Center; University of California, Davis
- Occupation: Novelist

Pushcart Prize winner and Best American Short Stories author Mark Wisniewski's third novel, Watch Me Go (Penguin Putnam, January 22, 2015), received early praise from Salman Rushdie, Ben Fountain, and Daniel Woodrell. Mark's first novel, Confessions of a Polish Used Car Salesman, was praised by the Los Angeles Times, the Chicago Tribune, the Milwaukee Journal-Sentinel, and C. Michael Curtis of The Atlantic Monthly. Wisniewski's second novel, Show Up, Look Good, was praised by Ben Fountain, Kirkus Reviews, Publishers Weekly, Psychology Today's Creativity Blog, Jonathan Lethem, Christine Sneed, Molly Giles, Richard Burgin, Kelly Cherry, Diana Spechler, DeWitt Henry, and T.R. Hummer.

More than 100 of Wisniewski's short stories have been published in print venues such as Best American Short Stories, The Pushcart Prize Anthology, The Southern Review, Antioch Review, Virginia Quarterly Review, New England Review, American Short Fiction, Mississippi Review, Fiction, The Missouri Review, The Gettysburg Review, TriQuarterly, Indiana Review, The Georgia Review, Glimmer Train, The Yale Review, and The Sun. Wisniewski has been awarded an Isherwood Fellowship in Fiction, two University of California Regents' Fellowships in Fiction, and first place in competitions for the Tobias Wolff Award, the Gival Short Story Award, and the Kay Cattarulla Award for Best Short Story. As fiction editor of New York Stories and California Quarterly, Wisniewski acquired work from and published John Updike, Frank McCourt, and Percival Everett.

As a book doctor and freelance editor, Wisniewski has, since the late 1980s, helped numerous writers nationwide publish dozens of short stories, novels, and collections of short fiction, many of them award-winning. He has taught and developed creative writing courses for City University of New York and the UC-Berkeley Extension, was a Distinguished Lecturer at Seton Hall University and was a visiting writer at the NYU Creative Writing Program's Writers in New York colloquia. His book Writing & Revising Your Fiction has been used by creative writing professors on both coasts. Hundreds of his poems of his have appeared in print venues such as The Iowa Review, Prairie Schooner, West Branch, Poetry International, The Hollins Critic, and Poetry.

== Bibliography ==
- Wisniewski, Mark S (2011). Show Up, Look Good: A Novel. Arlington, VA: Gival Press. ISBN 978-1928589600. OCLC 764561830.
- Wisniewski, Mark S (2006). One of Us One Night: Poems. Evil Genius Chapbook Contest Winner. Warsaw, IN: Platonic 3Way Press. ISBN 9781928589600. OCLC 128323369.
- Wisniewski, Mark S (2001). All Weekend with the Lights On : Short Stories. Leaping Dog Press (1st ed.). Chantilly, VA: Leaping Dog Press. ISBN 978-1-58775-002-1. OCLC 45877917.
- Wisniewski, Mark S (1997). Confessions of a Polish Used Car Salesman: A Novel. Davis, CA: Hi Jinx Press. ISBN 978-1-57650-069-9. OCLC 37426632.
- Wisniewski, Mark S (1995). Writing & Revising Your Fiction. Boston, MA: Writer, Inc. ISBN 978-0-87116-174-1. OCLC 31376759.
