= Balzac in the Robe of a Dominican Monk =

Sculpture by Auguste Rodin

- Balzac en robe de dominicain (French)
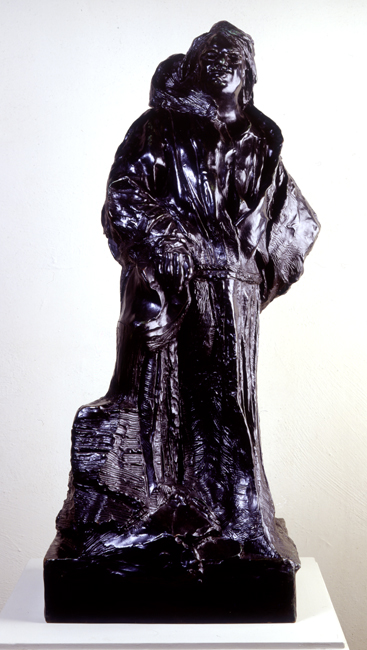
- The sculpture in display at Museo Soumaya
- Artist: Auguste Rodin
- Year: 1892
- Type: Sculpture
- Medium: Bronze
- Subject: Honoré de Balzac
- Dimensions: 106.4 cm × 38.5 cm × 50.8 cm (27 in × 9.8 in × 12.9 in)
- Location: Museo Soumaya; Mexico City

Balzac in the Robe of a Dominican Monk is a bronze sculpture by French artist Auguste Rodin, one of the studies made in preparation to the Monument to Balzac, a tribute to novelist Honoré de Balzac commissioned by the Society of Men of Letters of France in 1891.

== Development ==
This sculpture was a particular challenge to the artist due to his preference to portray his subjects in great detail, and the fact that Balzac was already dead. Rodin then started to research about the life and times of his subject, only to find, according to Kenneth Clark, that he had been a short, fat and unremarkable-looking man.

== Realisation ==
With this difficulty, Rodin aimed instead to represent Balzac's persona rather than his physical likeness. Instead of the agreed-upon eighteen months, Rodin spent seven years making different studies, both nude and non-nude, only to present his final plaster in 1898 at a Salon in Champ de Mars with great disapproval by the Societè. Disillusioned with this result, Rodin decided to install the plaster at his house in Meudon. Only in 1939 was a full-size cast put at the crossroads of boulevard Raspail and boulevard du Montparnasse, also known as carrefour Vavin, in the 6th arrondissement of Paris.

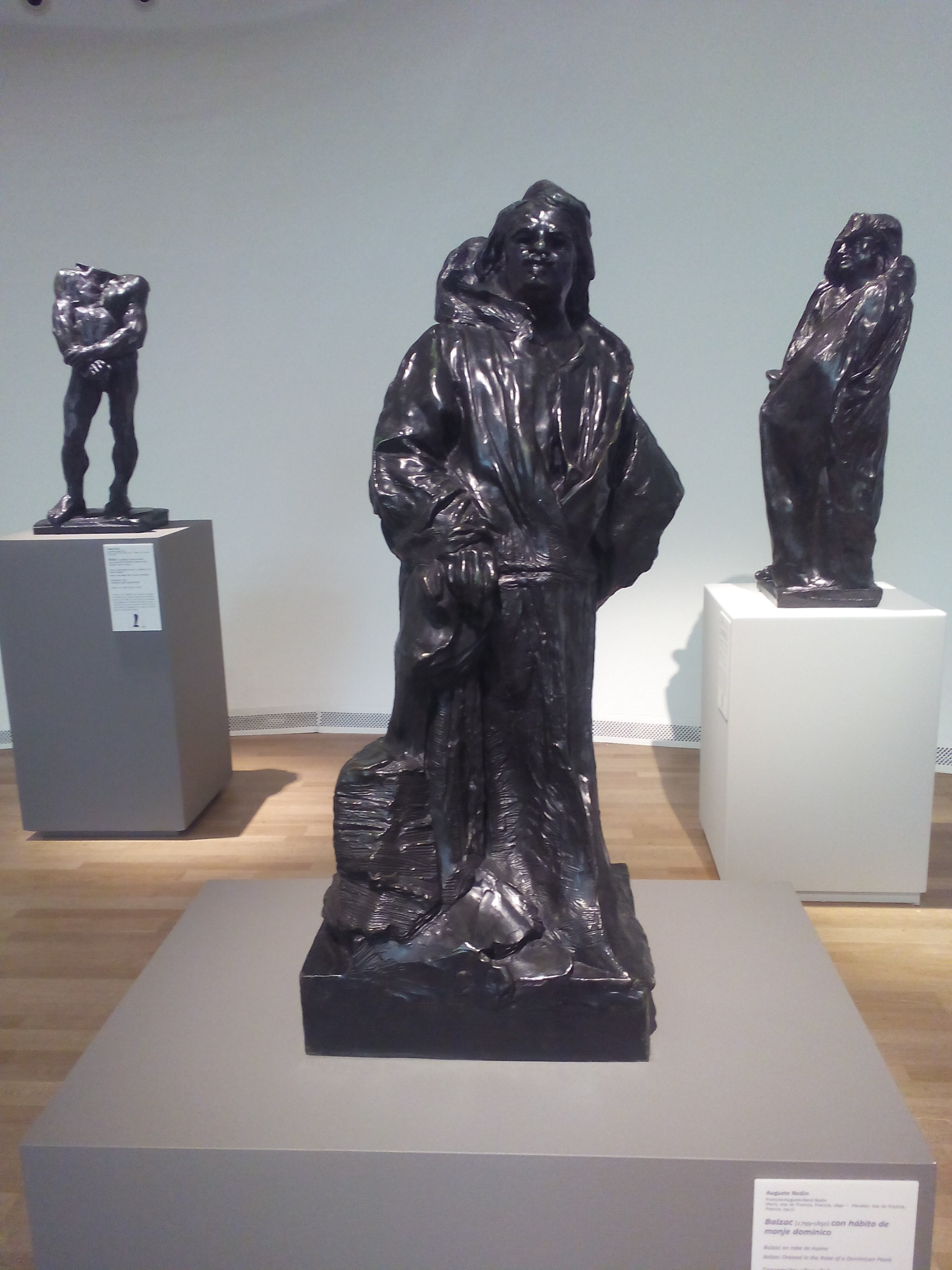
Three sculptures of Balzac made by Rodin

== Description ==
Unlike other studies and the final version of the monument, Balzac in the Robe of a Dominican Monk shows the author fully clothed with the traditional habit of the Dominican order—a simple cloak with a belt— standing in a rock-like structure and with both hands explicitly shown.

== Evaluation ==
It is considered by some later critics as one of the best sculptures made by the French artist. Rodin himself has been quoted about this piece, considering that "the fruit and summing-up of my entire life and the pivot of my personal aesthetic".

== See also ==
- List of sculptures by Auguste Rodin
