= Lowell Mick White =

American fiction writer living in Texas

- Born: Marion, Ohio, U.S.
- Citizenship: United States of America
- Education: B.A., University of Texas at Austin; M.A., Texas A&M University; Ph.D., Texas A&M University
- Occupations: Novelist; Short story writer; Academic
- Employer: Texas A&M University
- Known for: Fiction set in Texas; Dobie-Paisano Fellowship (1998)
- Notable work: Long Time Ago Good (2009); That Demon Life (2009)
- Awards: Dobie-Paisano Fellowship (1998); Gival Press Novel Award

Lowell Mick White is an American fiction writer living in Texas whose work focuses on the changing relationships between physical place and the individual.

== Early life and education ==
Born in Marion, Ohio, White grew up in Mankato, Minnesota, and Coxs Mills, West Virginia, and settled in Austin, Texas. After working a variety of jobs—including stints as a shade-tree salesman, bureaucrat, and cab driver—White received a B.A. from the University of Texas at Austin, and an M.A. and Ph.D. from Texas A&M University.

== Writing career ==
In 1998, White was awarded the Dobie-Paisano Fellowship by the University of Texas at Austin and the Texas Institute of Letters, a six-month residency at a ranch formerly belonging to writer J. Frank Dobie, an honor that has previously gone to such Texas writers as Sandra Cisneros, Dagoberto Gilb, and Oscar Casares. White, who had been working as a cab driver at the time of the award, said of his time at Paisano Ranch, "Basically, beyond the simple validation that the Dobie Paisano fellowship brought me—and validation and recognition are certainly an important part of the fellowship—my fellowship brought me the time and space I needed at that point in my life, the time I needed to read and think and get my writing moving."

White's first book, Long Time Ago Good: Sunset Dreams from Austin and Beyond, a story collection, was a finalist for the Texas Institute of Letters' Steven Turner Award for First Fiction. One reviewer said, “This short story collection takes a look at the changing city in its many incarnations. White chronicles its move from high to low tech as well as its transmogrification from a quaint, ‘everything’s local’ mentality to the strip-malled, suburban city it has become.”

White's novel, That Demon Life, won the Gival Press Novel Award and was nominated for the National Book Award. Of That Demon Life, novelist Larry Heinemann said, White shows “...a sly and witty and wry appreciation for the ordinary horrors of everyday life." A profile of White in the Austin American-Statesman said that the novel is "full of colorful, sketchy and disreputable characters you probably wouldn't want running your Brownie scout meeting." Another reviewer stated, “That Demon Life convinces me of two things: Austin will always be changing, and Austin will always be the same. White's novel captures much of the freedom and fun of the old Austin while also entertaining readers with a recognizable Austin—one that has evolved even in the last decade."

White currently teaches English at Texas A&M University, and is Writer-in-Residence at the Federal Prison Camp in Bryan, Texas.

== Works ==
=== Books ===
- Long Time Ago Good: Sunset Dreams from Austin and Beyond. Slough Press, 2009. ISBN 978-0-941720-04-5
- That Demon Life: A Novel. Gival Press, 2009. ISBN 978-1-928589-47-1

=== Short Fiction/Periodical ===
- “The Road Back to Destruction Bay,” Callaloo, Spring 2009
- “Wildlife Rehabilitation,” Southwestern American Literature, Fall 2008
- “Cindy's Shirt,” Concho River Review, Fall 2008
- “The Quiet Sport,” Broken Bridge Review, Fall 2008
- “Rocket,” Blood Lotus Journal, Fall 2006
- “The Point,” Cerebration, Fall 2006
- “Five Things,” Callaloo, Winter 2006
- “Reliction,” Short Story, Spring 2006
- “Deep Eddy,” R-KV-R-Y, September 2005
- “The Speed of Sound,” Iron Horse Literary Review, Summer 2005
- “Wintertime Driving,” Fresh Boiled Peanuts, Summer 2005
- “Corky the Squirrel,” Prism Quarterly, Summer 2005
- “Charlie’s Bridge,” The Dead Mule, June 2005
- “Bad Guts,” Mosaic Mind, December 2004
- “Tails,” Amarillo Bay, April 2004
- “Homesteaders,” Fiction Warehouse, January 2004
- “Screech Owls,” Antietam Review, Summer 1999
- “The Encounter,” FAN Magazine, Spring 1996
- “How Much for All This?,” Dominion Review, Fall 1995
- “The Carcass,” Gray's Sporting Journal, March 1995
- “The Endless Inning,” Aethlon, Winter 1995
- “The Big Purple Cloud,” Kinesis, August 1994
- “It May Be a Day, It May Be Forever,” Culture Concrete, Winter 1991
