= Tomb of Shams Tabrizi =

Tomb in Iran

Tomb of Shams Tabrizi (Persian: آرامگاه شمس تبریزی) is located beside a tower monument in a memorial park in Khoy, West Azerbaijan province, Iran. It has been nominated as a World Cultural Heritage Center by UNESCO.

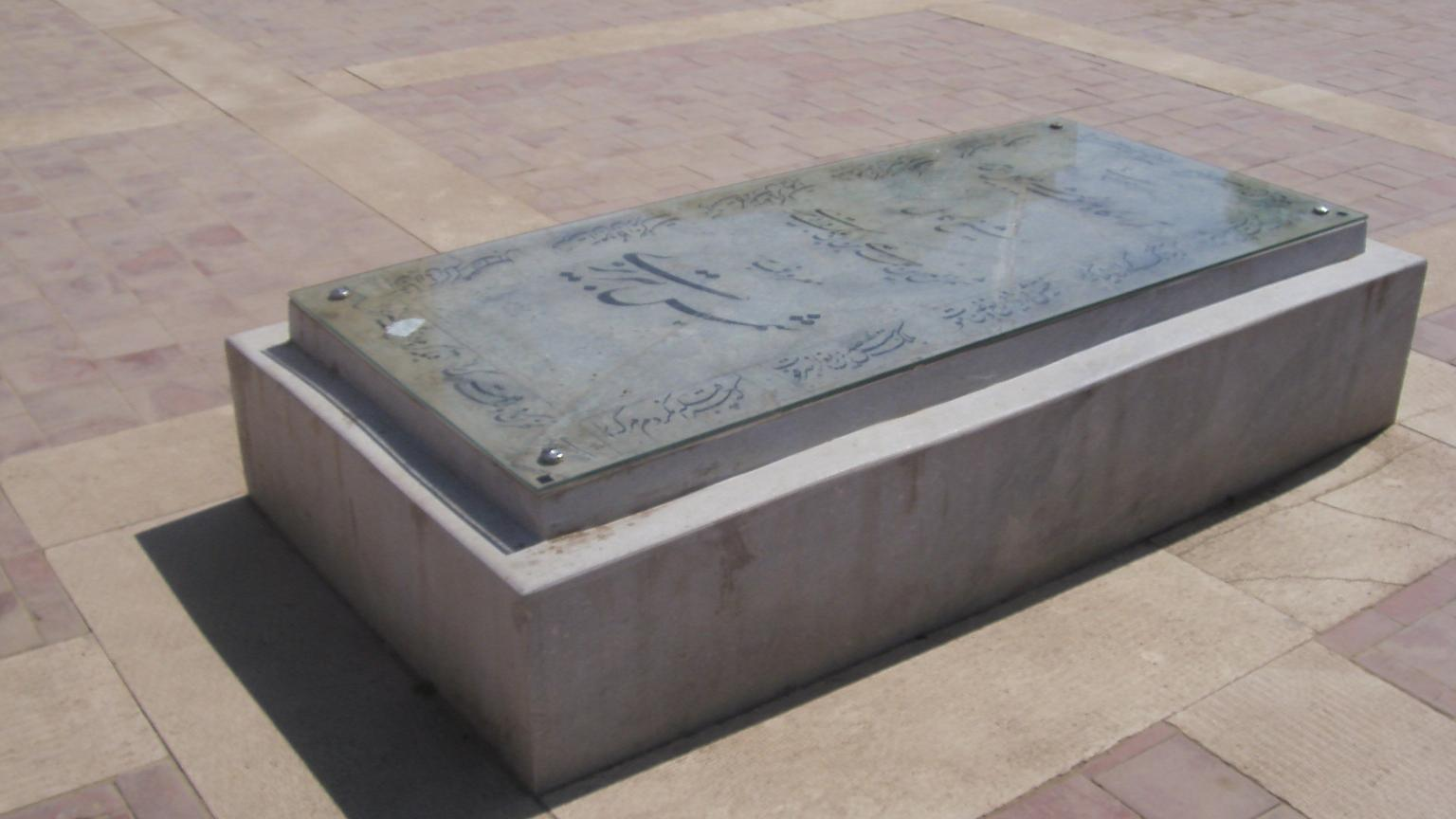
Tomb of Shams Tabrizi

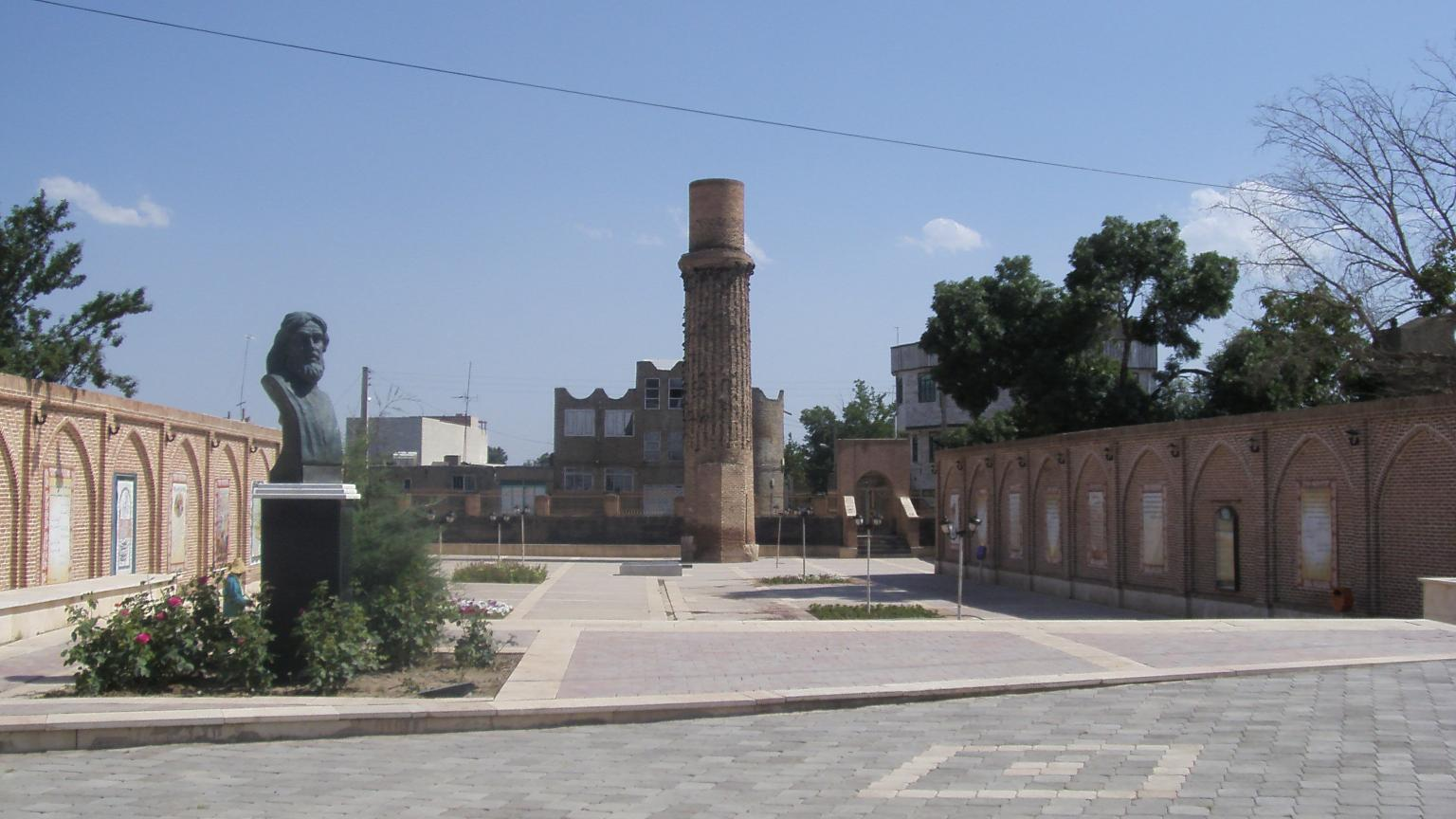
Tomb of Shams Tabrizi

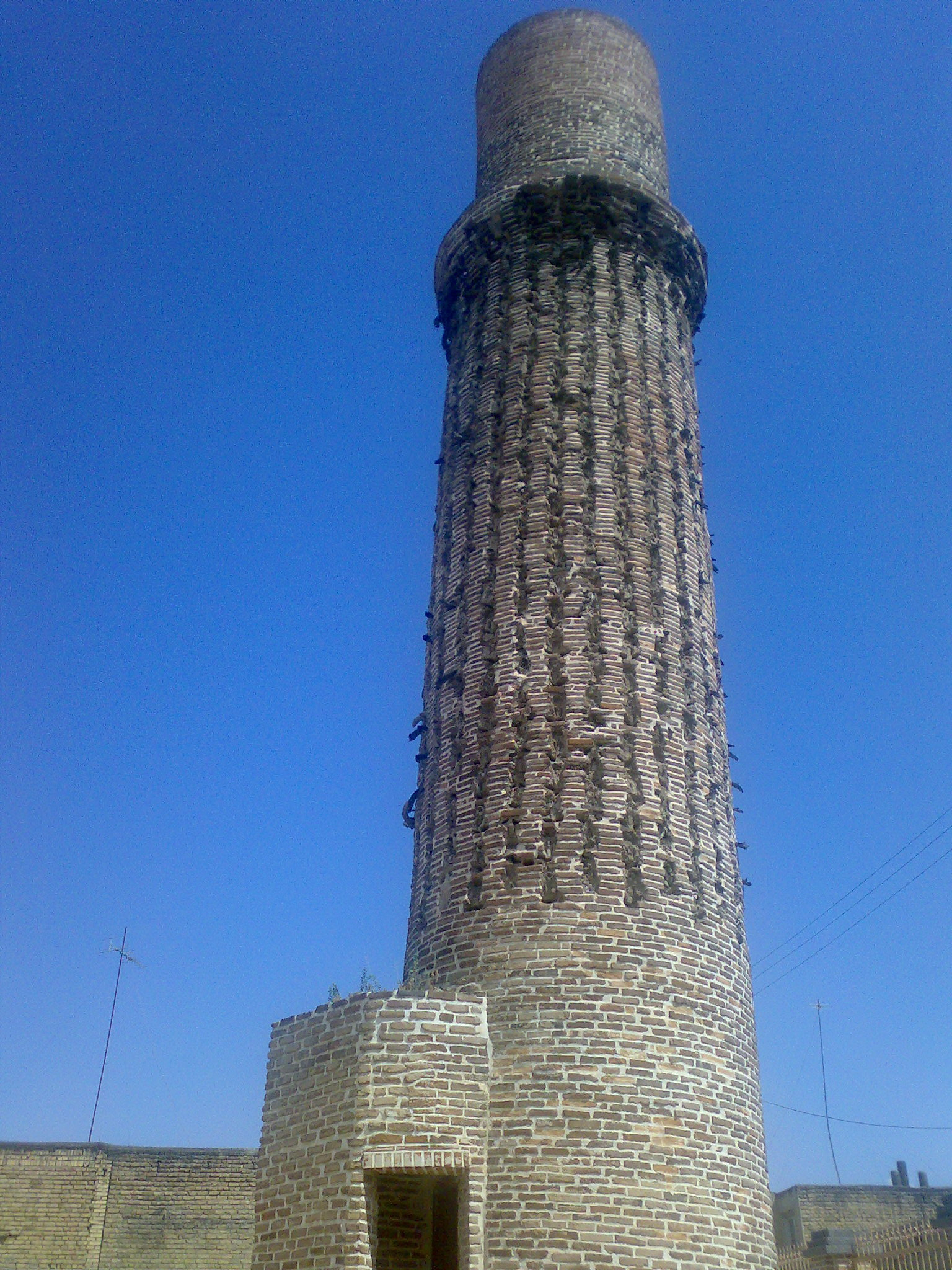
Tomb of Shams Tabrizi

== Gallery ==
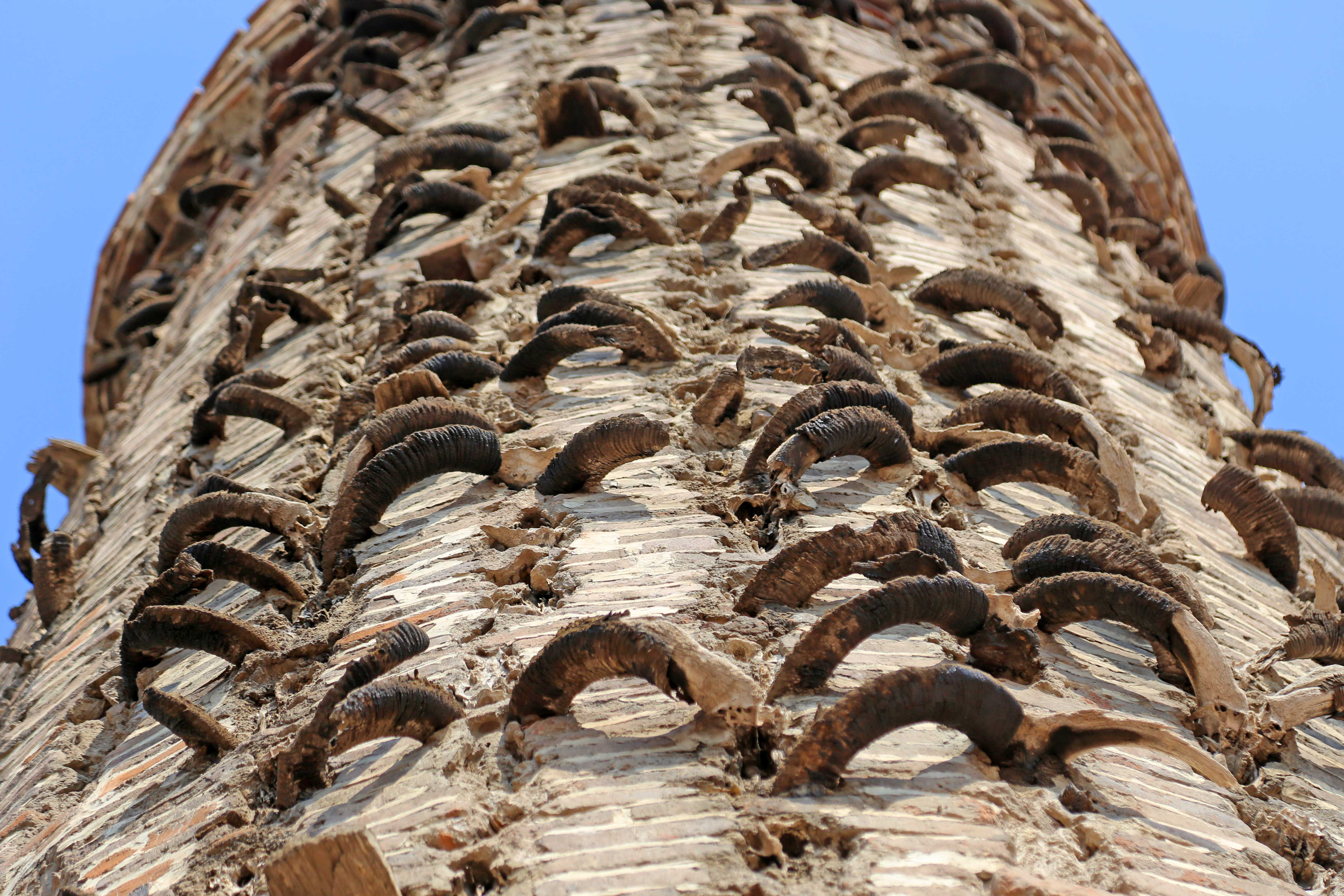
Minaret of the tomb of Shams Tabrizi, Khoy city

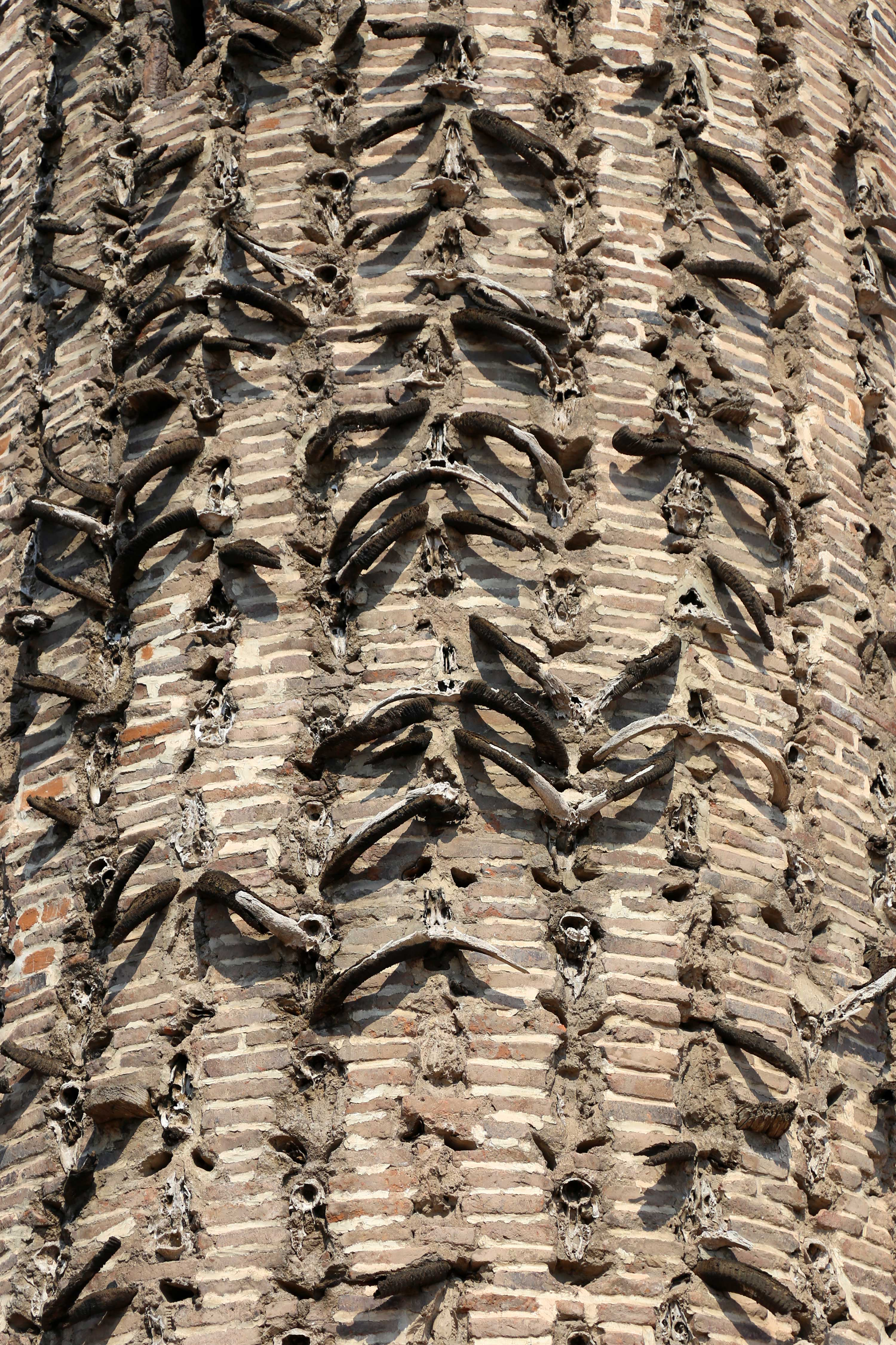
Minaret of the tomb of Shams Tabrizi, Khoy city

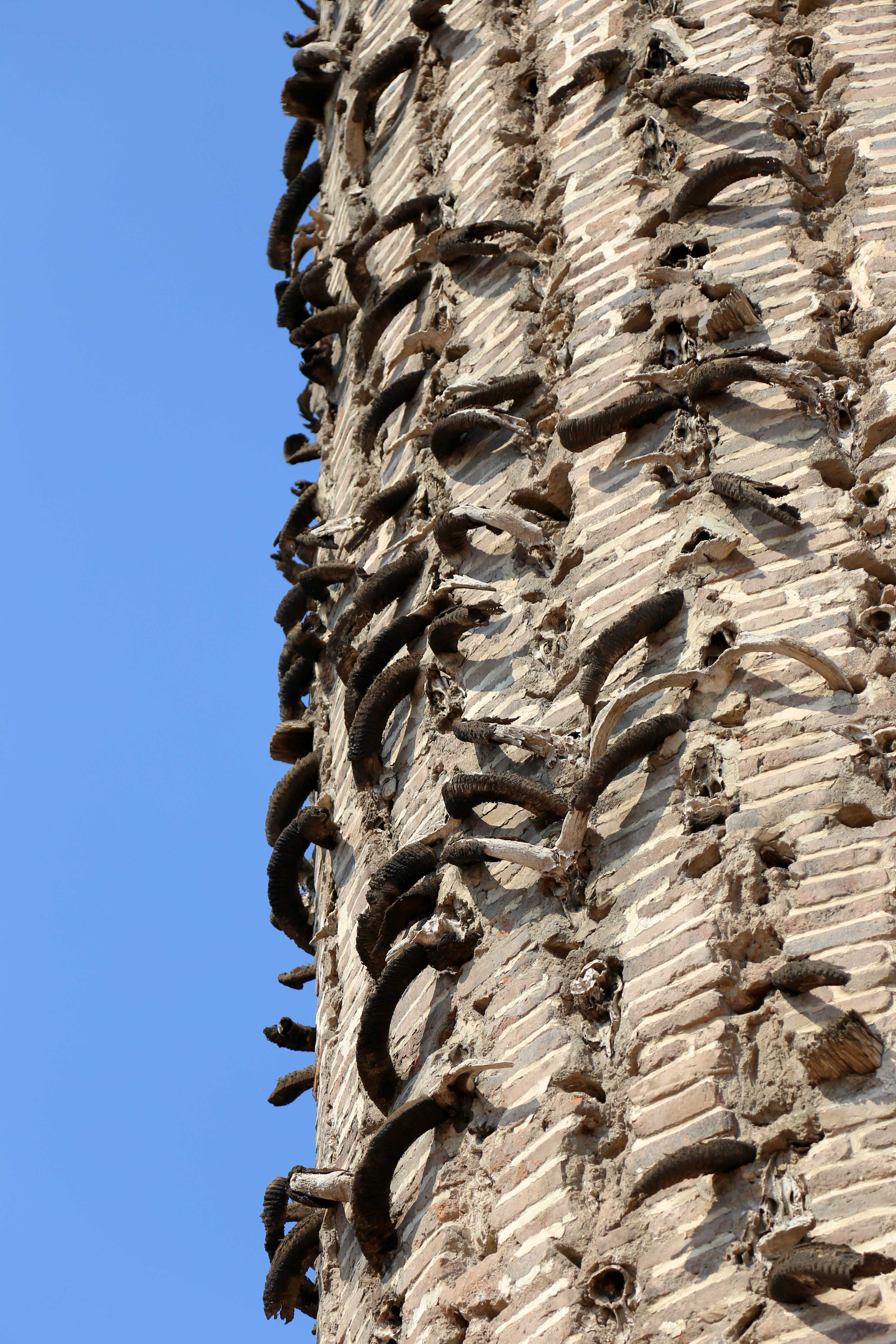
Minaret of the tomb of Shams Tabrizi, Khoy city

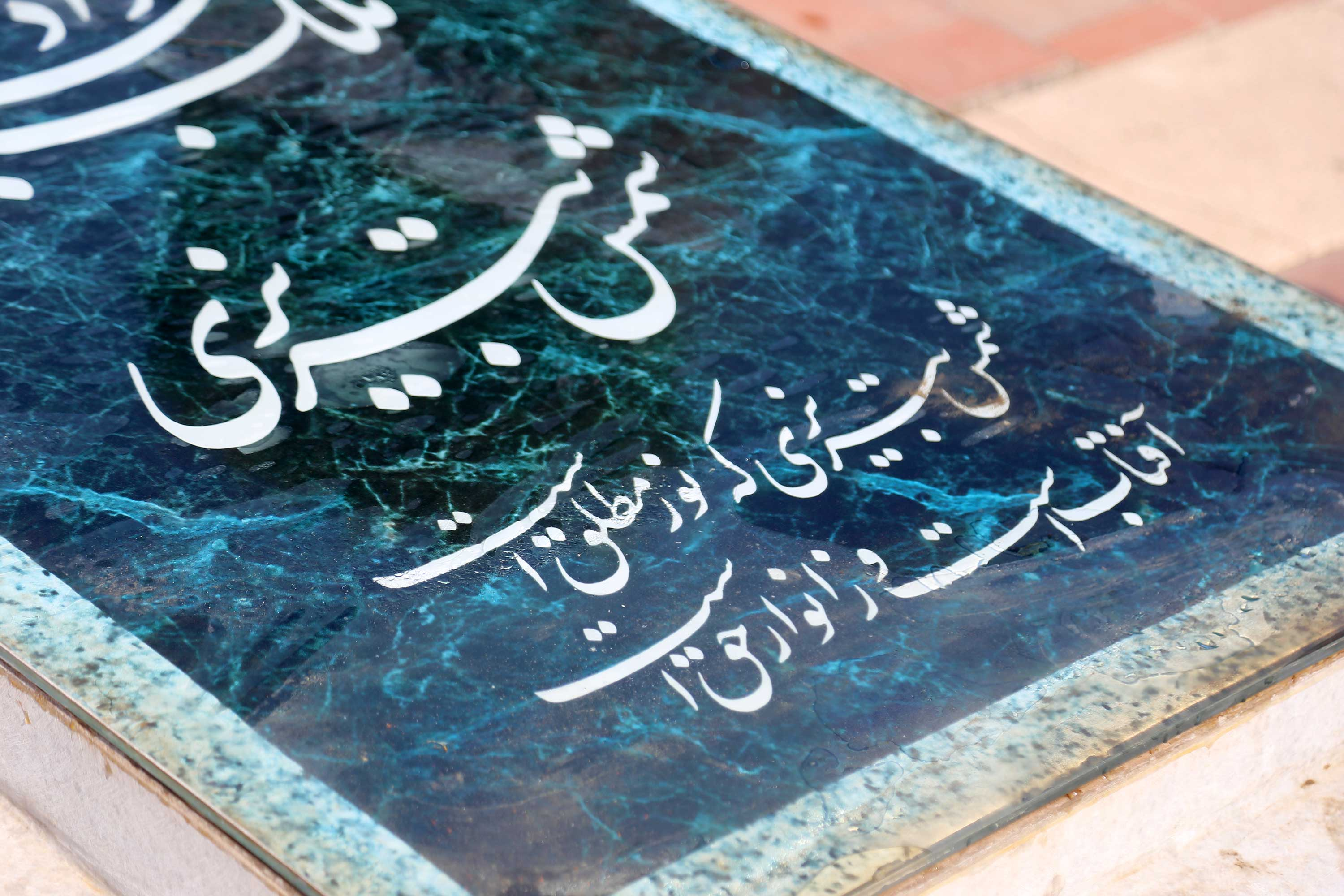
Tomb of Shams Tabrizi, Khoy city

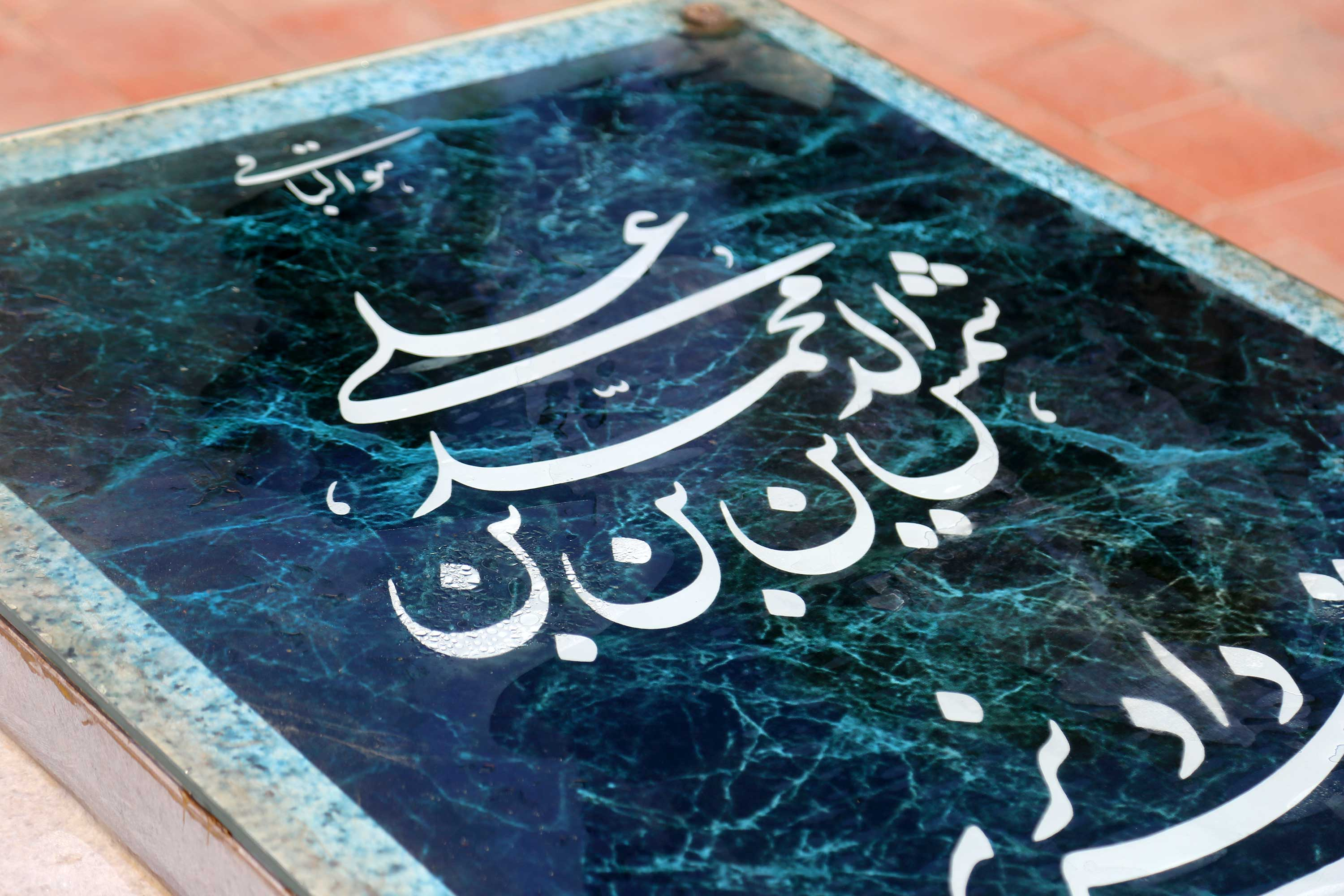
Tomb of Shams Tabrizi, Khoy city

== See also ==
- Shams Tabrizi
- Mevlana Museum
- Rumi
- Haji Bektash Veli
