= Brian Teare =

American poet (born 1974)

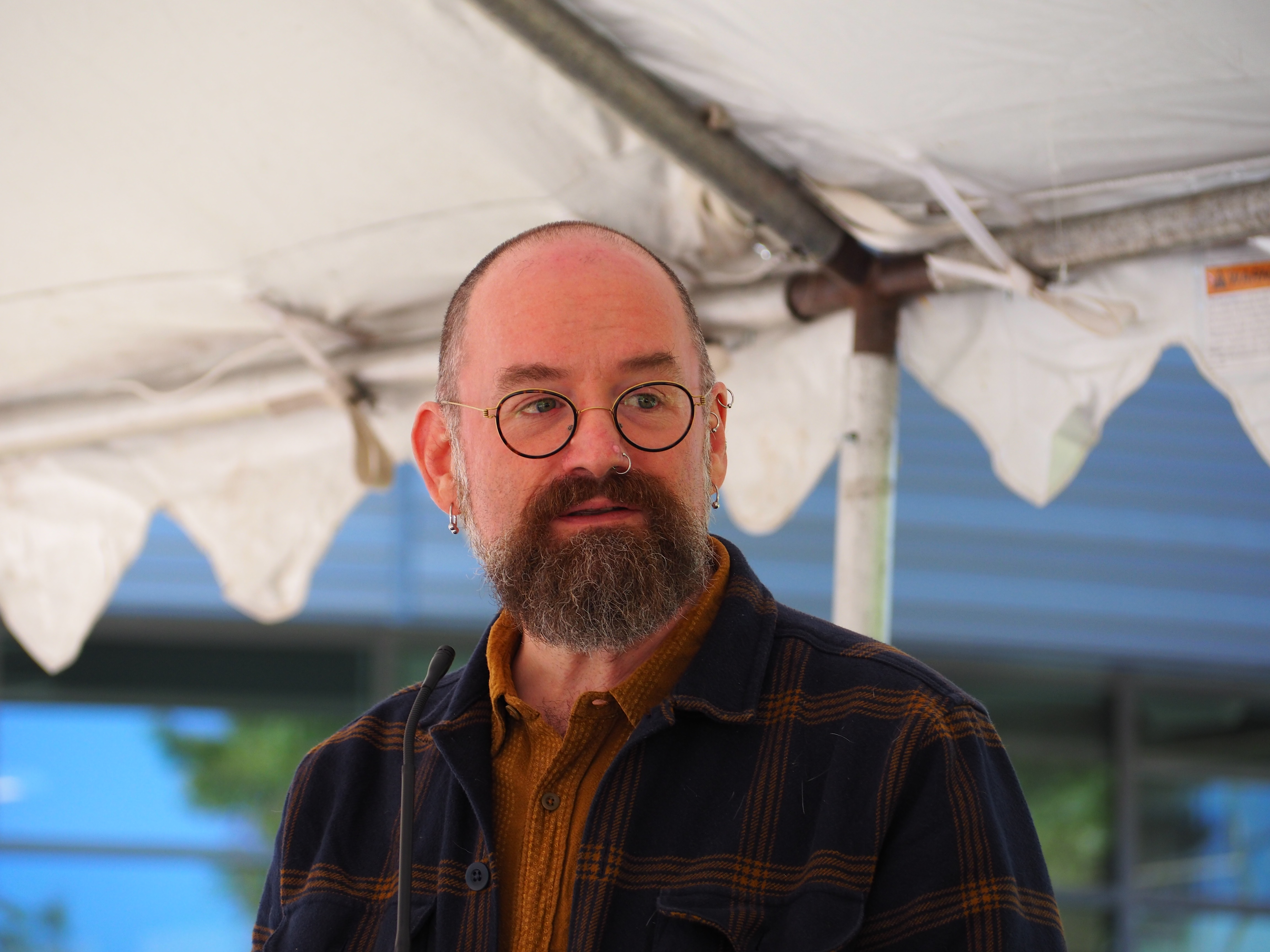
- Teare reading at Fall for the Book (2023)
- Born: 1974 (age 51–52); Athens, Georgia, US
- Education: University of Alabama (BA); Indiana University Bloomington (MA, 2000)
- Website: brianteare.net

Brian Teare (born 1974) is an American poet. He is the author of The Room Where I Was Born (2003), Sight Map (2009), Pleasure (2010), Companion Grasses (2013), The Empty Form Goes All the Way to Heaven (2015), Doomstead Days (2019) and Poem Bitten by a Man (2023). Teare is queer.

== Early life and education ==
Brian Teare was born in Athens, Georgia in 1974, and grew up in Tuscaloosa, Alabama. He received a Bachelor of Arts in English and creative writing from the University of Alabama, then a Master of Fine Arts from Indiana University Bloomington in 2000.

== Career ==
Teare has taught creative writing in the San Francisco Bay Area and at Temple University. As of 2021, he was an associate professor of Poetry at the University of Virginia.

Teare published his debut poetry collection, The Room Where I Was Born, with University of Wisconsin Press in 2003. The collection won the 2003 Thom Gunn Award and Brittingham Prize in Poetry.

In 2008, Teare founded the micropress Albion Books.

Teare's second poetry collection, Sight Map, was published by the University of California Press in 2009.

In 2010, Teare published Pleasure with Ahsahta Press. The collection won the 2011 Lambda Literary Award for Gay Poetry, and was a finalist for the Northern California Book Award for Poetry.

Companion Grasses, Teare's fourth poetry collection, was published with Omnidawn Publishing in 2013. Slate named it one of the year's best books of poetry. The following year, it was a finalist for the Kingsley Tufts Poetry Award and Lambda Literary Award for Gay Poetry.

Teare's fifth poetry collection, The Empty Form Goes All the Way to Heaven, was published by Ahsahta Press in 2015.

Doomstead Days, Teare's sixth poetry collection, was published by Nightboat Books in 2019. That year, it was longlisted for the National Book Award for Poetry. In 2020, Doomstead Days won the Four Quartets Prize and was a finalist for the Kingsley Tufts Poetry Award, Lambda Literary Award for Gay Poetry, and National Book Critics Circle Award for Poetry.

Teare's seventh poetry collection, Poem Bitten by a Man, was published by Nightboat Books in 2023. In 2024, the collection won the William Carlos Williams Award, and was a finalist for the Thom Gunn Award. It was also nominated for the 2024 PEN/Jean Stein Book Award, though Teare withdrew the book from consideration, along with several other authors, due to the organization's response to the Gaza war.

== Awards and honors ==
Teare has received the National Endowment for the Arts Fellowship in Literature, Pew Center for Arts & Heritage Fellowship (2015), Wallace Stegner Fellowship in Creative Writing, Guggenheim Fellowship (2020), American Antiquarian Society Fellowship and MacDowell Colony residency.

Awards for Teare's writing
Title	Year	Award	Result	Ref.
The Room Where I Was Born	2003	Brittingham Prize in Poetry	Winner	
The Room Where I Was Born	2003	Thom Gunn Award	Winner	
Pleasure	2011	Lambda Literary Award for Gay Poetry	Winner	
Pleasure	2011	Northern California Book Award for Poetry	Finalist	
Companion Grasses	2014	Kingsley Tufts Poetry Award	Finalist	
Companion Grasses	2014	Lambda Literary Award for Gay Poetry	Finalist	
Doomstead Days	2019	National Book Award for Poetry	Longlist	
Doomstead Days	2020	Kingsley Tufts Poetry Award	Finalist	
Doomstead Days	2020	Lambda Literary Award for Gay Poetry	Finalist	
Doomstead Days	2020	National Book Critics Circle Award for Poetry	Finalist	
"Toxics Release Inventory (Essay on Man)", from Doomstead Days	2020	Four Quartets Prize	Winner	
Poem Bitten by a Man	2024	Thom Gunn Award	Finalist	
Poem Bitten by a Man	2024	William Carlos Williams Award	Winner	

== Books ==
- The Room Where I Was Born. University of Wisconsin Press. 2003.
- Sight Map. University of California Press. 2009.
- Pleasure. Ahsahta Press. 2010.
- Companion Grasses. Omnidawn Publishing. 2013. ISBN 978-1-890650-79-7.
- The Empty Form Goes All the Way to Heaven. Ahsahta Press. 2015. ISBN 978-1-934103-62-3.
- Doomstead Days. Nightboat Books. 2019. ISBN 978-1-64362-002-2.
- Poem Bitten by a Man. Nightboat Books. 2023. ISBN 978-1-64362-210-1.
