= Desiree C. Bailey =

Trindadian-American Poet

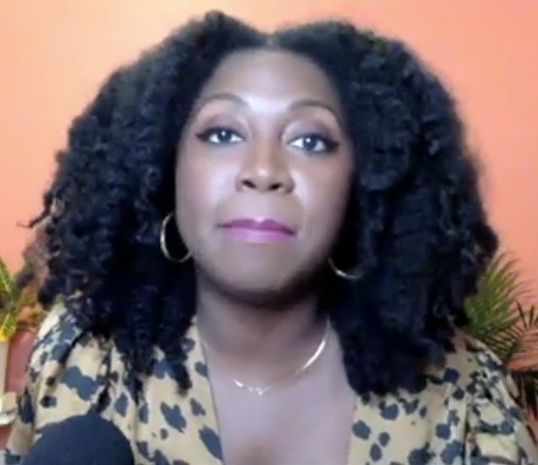
- In a 2021 National Book Foundation video
- Born: Trinidad and Tobago
- Education: Georgetown University (BA), Brown University (MFA), New York University (MFA)
- Occupation: Poet
- Writing career
- Language: English
- Notable work: What Noise Against the Cane (2021)
- Notable awards: Yale Younger Poets Prize (2020)

Desiree C. Bailey is a Trinidadian-American poet and 2020 winner of the Yale Series of Younger Poets Competition. She teaches poetry at the University of Massachusetts Amherst.

== Biography ==
Bailey was born in Trinidad and Tobago. Bailey attended Georgetown University, Brown University and New York University.

Bailey's manuscript What Noise Against the Cane was selected by series judge Carl Phillips as the winner of the 2020 Yale Series of Younger Poets Competition and published in 2021. What Noise Against the Cane was also a finalist for the 2022 Kate Tufts Discovery Award, the 2022 T.S. Eliot Four Quartets Prize, and the 2021 National Book Award for Poetry, as well as being named one of the "Best Books of 2021" by the New York Public Library. Bailey was a James Merrill House Fellow in 2021.

== Works ==
- What Noise Against the Cane, New Haven, Connecticut; London: Yale University Press, 2021. ISBN 9780300256536
