= Robyn Schiff =

American poet (born 1973)

- Born: January 10, 1973 (age 53) Metuchen, New Jersey, U.S.
- Education: Sarah Lawrence College (BA); University of Bristol (MA); University of Iowa (MFA)
- Spouse: Nick Twemlow

Robyn Schiff (born January 10, 1973) is an American poet who is a Guggenheim Fellow, and Pulitzer Prize nominee.

== Life ==
Schiff was born in Metuchen, New Jersey. She received a BA from Sarah Lawrence College, an MA in medieval studies from University of Bristol and an MFA from the Iowa Writers' Workshop in 1999.

Her poems have appeared in Poetry, The New Yorker, The New Republic, A Public Space, Boston Review, Black Warrior Review, and elsewhere. She is the author of the poetry collections Worth, Revolver (a finalist for a 2008 PEN award), and A Woman of Property. Her most recent book, Information Desk (Penguin Books, 2023), was named a finalist for the Pulitzer Prize for poetry and won the 2024 Four Quartets Prize.

In a 2014 essay in Boston Review, poetry critic Stephanie Burt described Schiff's work, along with other poets including Angie Estes, Nada Gordon, and Ange Mlinko, as "nearly Baroque."

She is co-editor of Canarium Books. Schiff joined the University of Iowa faculty in 2008 as an associate professor of English, teaching poetry in the Department of English and directing undergraduate creative writing. She has since taught at Emory University and is currently a professor in the Department of English Language and Literature at the University of Chicago, where she also directs the Program in Creative Writing. In 2024, she was named a Guggenheim Fellow.

She lives in Chicago, Illinois, with her husband, poet and filmmaker Nick Twemlow, who is also on the faculty at the University of Chicago, and their child, Sacha Twemlow.

== Bibliography ==
=== Poetry collections ===
- Worth. University of Iowa Press, Kuhl House Poets Series. 2002. ISBN 9780877458203.
- Revolver. University of Iowa Press, Kuhl House Poets Series. 2008. ISBN 9781587296956.
- A Woman of Property. Penguin. 2016. ISBN 9780143128274.
- Information Desk. Penguin. 2023. ISBN 9780143136804.

=== Anthology appearances ===
- Michael Dumanis; Mark Doty; Cate Marvin, eds. (2006). Legitimate Dangers: American Poets of the New Century. Sarabande Books. ISBN 9781932511291.
- Ariel Greenberg and Rachel Zucker, ed. (2008). Women Poets on Mentorship: Efforts and Affections. University of Iowa Press. ISBN 9781587296390.
- Kevin A. Gonzales; Lauren Shapiro, eds. (2013). The New Census: Anthology of Contemporary American Poetry. Rescue Press. ISBN 9780988587311.

=== Poems ===
- "Colt Rapid Fire Revolver". Poetry Society of America.
- "Dear Ralph Lauren". Jubilat. 14. 2007.
- "A Hearing". Boston Review. April 15, 2014.
- "H1N1". Poetry. April 2010.
- "Gate". The New Yorker. April 22, 2013.

== Critical studies and reviews of Schiff's work ==
- Chiasson, Dan (March 21, 2016). "The tenderness trap : Robyn Schiff and the poetry of ordinary terror". The Critics. Books. The New Yorker. Vol. 92, no. 6. pp. 89–90.
