= Shams Tabrizi =

Persian poet (1185–1248)

Shams Tabrīzī
- شمس تبریزی
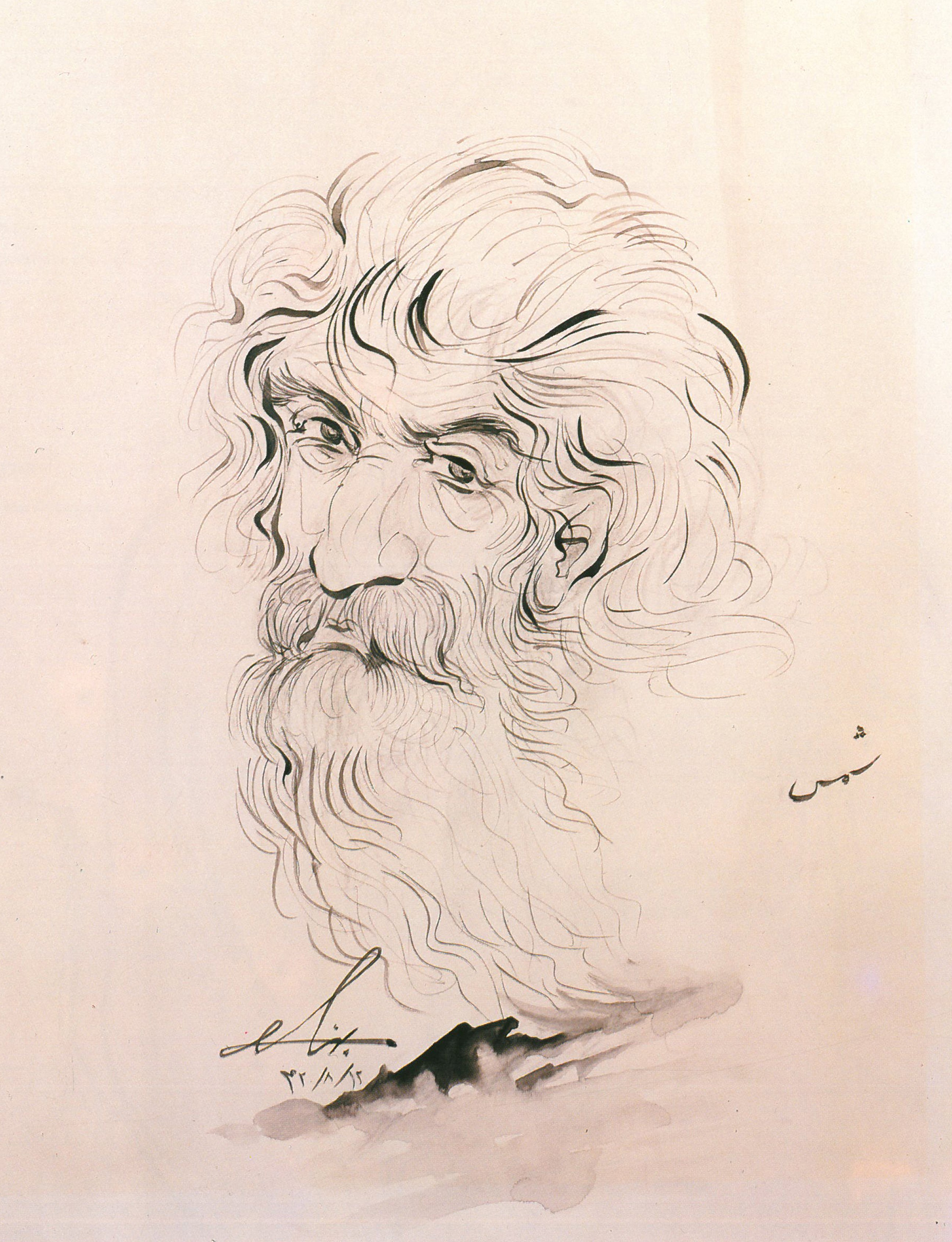
- Persian miniature of Shams Tabrizi by Hossein Behzad, dated 1963
- Born: 1185; Tabriz, Seljuk Empire
- Died: 1248 (aged 62–63); Khoy, Mongol Empire
- Resting place: Khoy, Iran
- Occupations: Weaver, poet, philosopher, teacher

Shams Tabrīzī (Note: Persian: شمس تبریزی) (1185–1248) was an Iranian dervish and poet, best known for his companionship with Rumi.

He is referenced with great reverence and grief in Rumi's poetic collection, in particular Divan-i Shams-i Tabrīzī. Tradition holds that Shams taught Rumi in seclusion in Konya for a period of forty days, before fleeing for Damascus. The tomb of Shams-i Tabrīzī was recently nominated to be a UNESCO World Heritage Site.

== Life ==
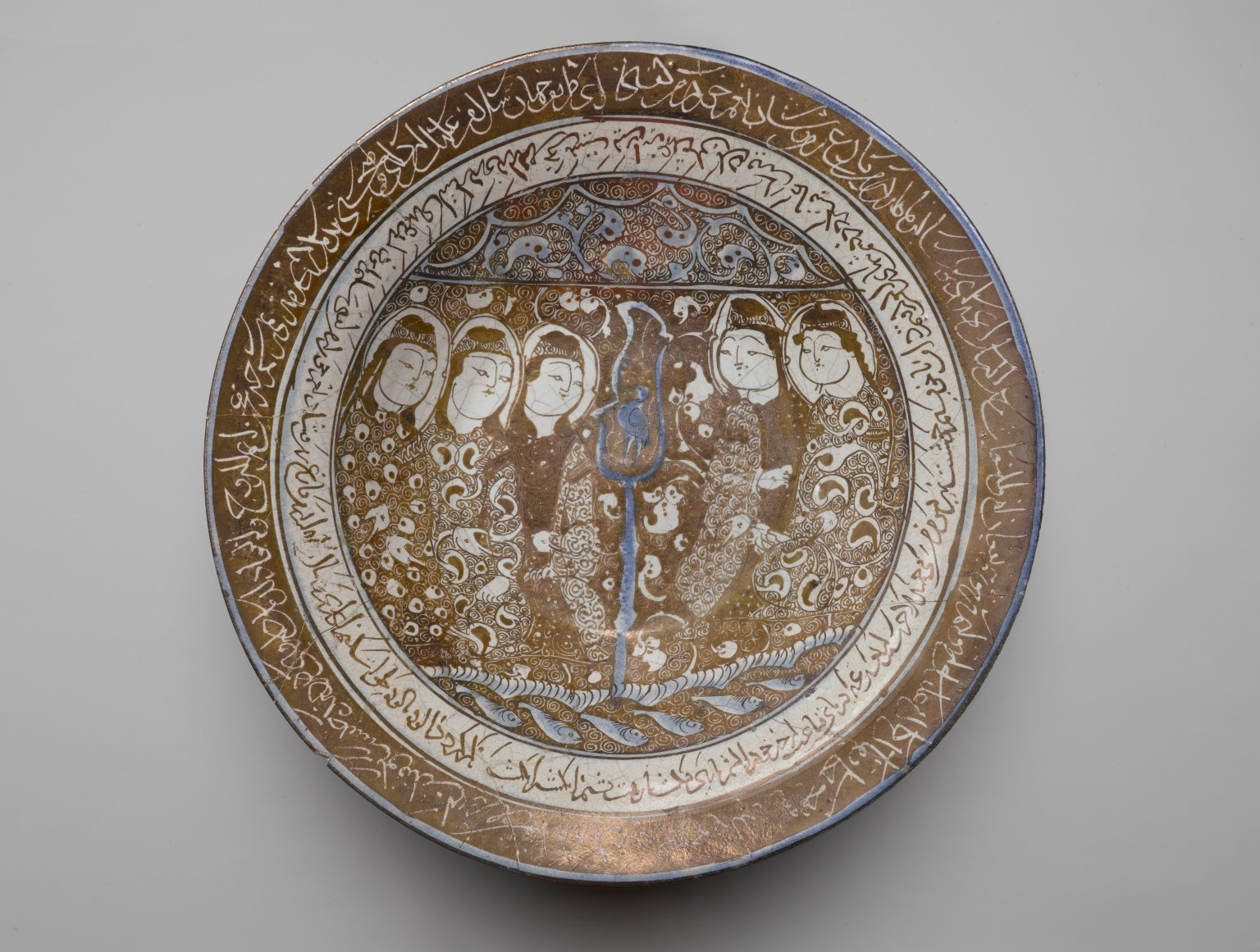
Bowl of Reflections, early 13th century. Brooklyn Museum.

According to Sipah Salar, a devotee and intimate friend of Rumi who spent forty days with him, Shams was the son of the Imam Ala al-Din. In a work entitled Manāqib al-'arifīn (Eulogies of the Gnostics), Aflaki names a certain 'Ali as the father of Shams-i Tabrīzī and his grandfather as Malikdad. Apparently basing his calculations on Haji Bektash Veli's Maqālāt (Conversations), Aflaki suggests that Shams arrived in Konya at the age of sixty years. However, various scholars have questioned Aflaki's reliability.

Shams received his education in Tabriz and was a disciple of Baba Kamal al-Din Jumdi. Before meeting Rumi, he apparently traveled from place to place weaving baskets and selling girdles for a living. Despite his occupation as a weaver, Shams received the epithet of "the embroiderer" (zarduz) in various biographical accounts including that of the Iranian historian Dawlatshah Samarqandi. This however, is not the occupation listed by Haji Bektash Veli in the Maqālat and was rather the epithet given to the Isma'ili Imam Shams al-Din Muhammad, who worked as an embroiderer while living in anonymity in Tabriz. The transference of the epithet to the biography of Rumi's mentor suggests that this Imam's biography must have been known to Shams-i Tabrīzī's biographers. The specificities of how this transference occurred, however, are not yet known.

=== Shams' first encounter with Rumi ===
On 15 November 1244, a man in a black suit from head to toe came to the famous inn of Sugar Merchants of Konya. His name was Shams Tabrizi. He was claiming to be a travelling merchant. As it was said in Haji Bektash Veli's book, "Makalat", he was looking for something which he was going to find in Konya. Eventually he found Rumi riding a black horse.

One day Rumi was reading next to a large stack of books. Shams Tabriz, passing by, asked him, "What are you doing?" Rumi scoffingly replied, "Something you cannot understand." (This is knowledge that cannot be understood by the unlearned.) On hearing this, Shams threw the stack of books into a nearby pool of water. Rumi hastily rescued the books and to his surprise they were all dry. Rumi then asked Shams, "What is this?" To which Shams replied, "Mowlana, this is what you cannot understand." (This is knowledge that cannot be understood by the learned.)

A second version of the tale has Shams passing by Rumi who again is reading a book. Rumi regards him as an uneducated stranger. Shams asks Rumi what he is doing, to which Rumi replies, "Something that you do not understand!" At that moment, the books suddenly catch fire and Rumi asks Shams to explain what happened. His reply was, "Something you do not understand."

After several years with Rumi in Konya, Shams left and settled in Khoy. As the years passed, Rumi attributed more and more of his own poetry to Shams as a sign of love for his departed friend and master. In Rumi's poetry Shams becomes a guide towards Allah's (Creator) love for mankind; Shams was a sun ("Shams" means "Sun" in Arabic) shining the Light of Sun as guide for the right path dispelling darkness in Rumi's heart, mind, and body on earth.

== Death ==
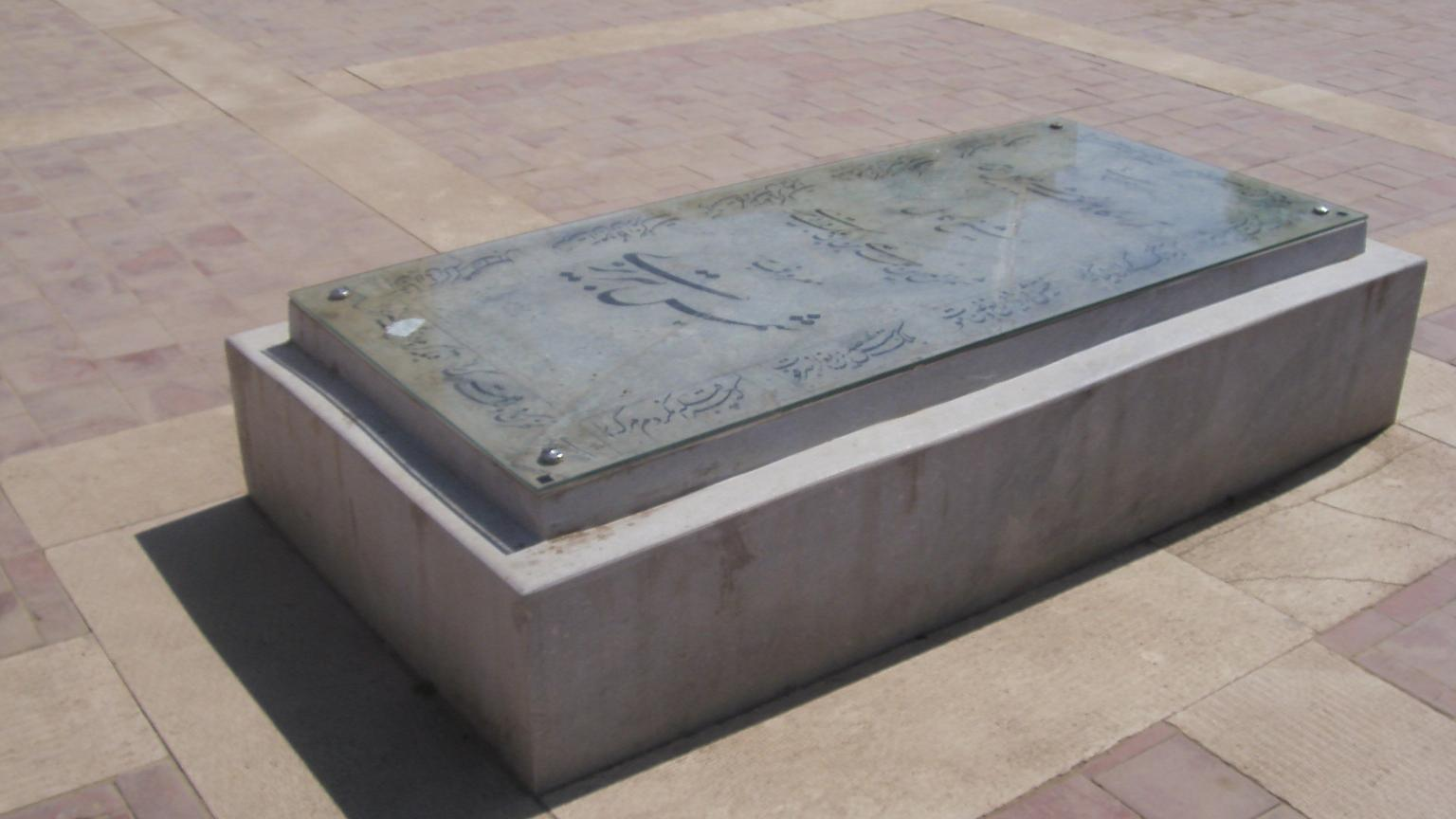
Tomb of Shams Tabrizi

According to contemporary Sufi tradition, Shams Tabrizi mysteriously disappeared: some say he was killed by close disciples of Mowlana Jalaluddin Rumi who were jealous of the close relationship between Rumi and Shams, but according to many certain evidences, he left Konya and died in Khoy where he was buried. Sultan Walad, Rumi's son, in his Walad-Nama mathnawi just mentions that Shams mysteriously disappeared from Konya with no more specific details.

Shams Tabrizi's tomb in Khoy, beside a tower monument in a memorial park, has been nominated as a World Cultural Heritage Center by UNESCO.

== Discourse of Shams Tabrīzī ==
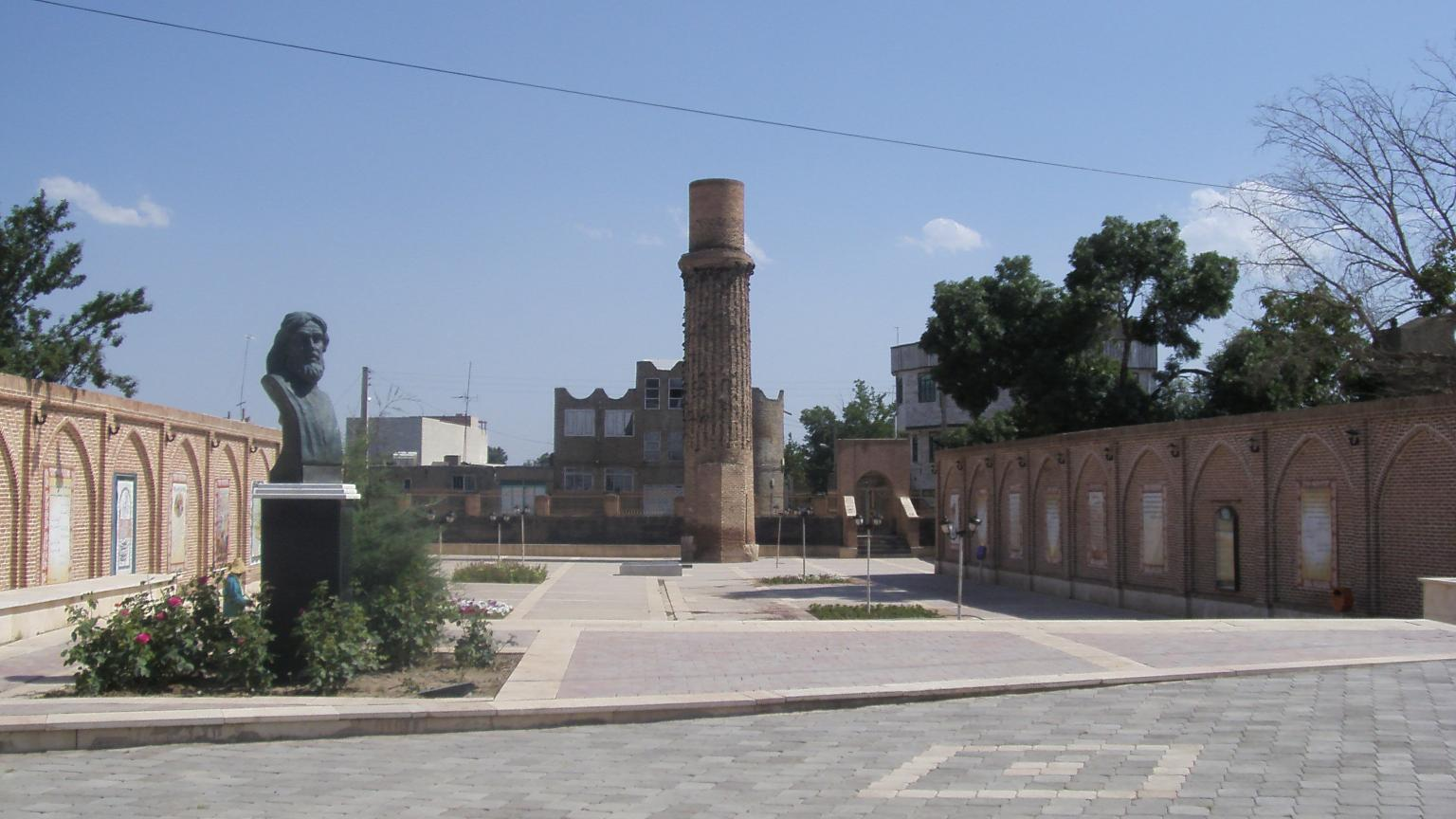
Tomb of Shams Tabrizi

The Maqalat-e Shams-e Tabrizi (Discourse of Shams-i Tabrīzī) is a Persian prose book written by Shams. The Maqalat seems to have been written during the later years of Shams, as he speaks of himself as an old man. Overall, it bears a mystical interpretation of Islam and contains spiritual advice.

Some excerpts from the Maqalat provide insight into the thoughts of Shams:

- Blessing is excess, so to speak, an excess of everything. Don't be content with being a faqih (religious scholar), say I want more – more than being a Sufi (a mystic), more than being a mystic – more than each thing that comes before you.
- A good man complains of no-one; he does not look to faults.
- Joy is like pure clear water; wherever it flows, wondrous blossoms grow…Sorrow is like a black flood; wherever it flows it wilts the blossoms.
- And the Persian language, how did it happen? With so much elegance and goodness such that the meanings and elegance that is found in the Persian language is not found in Arabic.
- The meaning of the Book of God is not the text, it is the man who guides. He is the Book of God, he is its verses, he is scripture.

An array of mystical poetry, laden with devotional sentiments and strong 'Alid inclinations, has been attributed to Shams-i Tabrīzī across the Persian Islamic world. Scholars such as Gabrielle van den Berg have sometimes questioned whether these were really authored by Shams-i Tabrīzī. However, later scholars have pointed out that it may instead be a question of whether the name Shams-i Tabriz has been used for more than one person. Van den Berg suggests that this identification is the pen name of Rumi. However she acknowledges that, despite the large number of poems attributed to Shams, that comprise the devotional repertoire of the Ismailis of Badakhshan, an overwhelming majority of these cannot be located in any of the existing works of Rumi. Rather, as Virani observes, some of these are located in the "Rose Garden of Shams" (Gulzār-i Shams), authored by Mulukshah, a descendant of the Ismaili Pir Shams, as well as in other works.

== See also ==
- List of Persian poets and authors
- Persian literature
- Rumi's Kimia
- Alevism
- The Twelve Imams
- Haji Bektash Veli
- Sculpture (film)
