= Rolf Hind =

British pianist and composer (born 1964)

Rolf Hind (born 1964 in London) is a British pianist and composer. He studied at the Royal College of Music in London and at the University of California, Los Angeles.

== Biography ==
Rolf Hind was born in London to a German mother and an English father. He studied piano with Kendall Taylor, John Barstow, John Constable, Johana Harris and composition with Edwin Roxburgh and Jeremy Dale Roberts. Hind teaches at the Guildhall School of Music and Drama (piano, composition, Research associate) and at the Royal Academy of Music, as well as Brunel University, Dartington Summer School and in conservatories throughout Europe and Asia.

His tours have taken him from Carnegie Hall to The Proms and he has played at many major festivals and stages internationally.

A specialist in 20th- and 21st-century repertoire, Hind has worked with many composers, and been dedicatee of new works. Such collaborations include John Adams, Unsuk Chin, Tan Dun, Helmut Lachenmann, Per Nørgård, Poul Ruders, Thomas Ades, George Benjamin, Olivier Messiaen, György Ligeti, György Kurtág, Michael Finnissy, James Dillon, James MacMillan, Julius Eastman and Rebecca Saunders.

He has made many appearances as soloist; with the Danish Radio Symphony Orchestra, the Munich Radio Orchestra, Baltimore Symphony Orchestra, the Chamber Orchestra of Europe, the South West German Radio Orchestra, the Stockholm Sinfonietta, the Vienna Chamber Orchestra, and orchestras in the Netherlands, Italy, Ireland, Norway, France, Portugal and the US under conductors including Vladimir Ashkenazy, Simon Rattle, Leonard Slatkin, Andrew Davis, Markus Stenz, Oliver Knussen and Franz Welser-Möst.

Hind was signed in his early twenties to the cult Manchester label Factory Records, as a soloist. His playing can be heard on the soundtrack of the 2017 film Call Me By Your Name.

== Selected recordings ==
- Ligeti, Martland, Carter, Messiaen, Factory records: FAC 256 (1989)
- Country Music (Grainger, Finnissy, Bartok, Janacek, McMillan), Factory Records (1990), re-issued in 2013 by Heritage Records
- Meditations - Olivier Messiaen disc. United Records (1994)
- Karl Aage Rasmussen - piano works, Bridge Records, New York. (1997)
- Poul Ruders - piano music, Dacapo Records (2001)
- Crying Bird, Echoing Star (contains The Horse Sacrifice), London Records (2002)
- John Adams: Road Movies, Nonesuch Records (2004)
- Per Norgard/Rolf Hind: Secret Melody - works for piano, two pianos, violin, Dacapo Records (2007)
- Simon Holt: A book of colours, NMC Recordings (2009)
- Rolf Hind: Orchestra and chamber Music includes Maya-Sesha, The Eye of Fire, The City of Love, NEOS (2013)

== Selected compositions ==
Rolf Hind resumed a career as a composer after a long hiatus, inspired by travels and his meetings with many composers and artists in his career as a pianist. He has written pieces for orchestra, voice, chamber ensemble and solo instruments, as well as being inspired by the virtuosity and open-mindedness of musicians he has worked with regularly: singer Loré Lixenberg, violinist David Alberman, accordionist James Crabb, clarinettist Stuart King. Works are often influenced by his interests in Indian culture and history, as well as meditation and yoga, the languages of India, and aspects of its classical music tradition. Hind's works are published by Casa Ricordi.

They include:

- The Horse Sacrifice (2001), for piano, percussion, flute(s), clarinet(s), violin and cello. premiered and recorded by the New Music Players, commissioned by the Brighton Festival.
- The City of Love (2004), three songs in Brij Bhasa by Bihari (mediaeval Indian poet) for soprano, cello (or violin) and prepared piano.
- The Eye of Fire (2006), a sequence of movements based on yoga positions for string quartet and prepared piano
- Maya-Sesha (2007), for piano and orchestra, commissioned by the BBC and premiered by the composer and BBC Scottish Symphony Orchestra
- The Tiniest House of Time (2012), for accordion and orchestra, Commissioned by the BBC and premiered by James Crabb, BBC Symphony Orchestra
- Sit, Stand Walk (2011), for solo clarinet and large ensemble, commissioned by Chroma and Spitalfields music and premiered at Spitalfields Festival, London
- An Eagle Darkens the Sky (2013), for cello and piano
- Thus Have I Heard (2014), for solo piano, dedicated to: Jonathan Harvey, with metta, commissioned by St Johns Smith Square
- WAY OUT EAST (2015), for singer, percussion, saxophone and piano. First performed at Takkeloftet Copenhagen.
- Lost in Thought (2016), a meditation- opera for singer, seven instruments and audience of meditators. commissioned by the Barbican Centre. Performances in London, Bangor, Manchester, Hamburg.
- On What Weft Are WOven the Waters (2017), for 16 instruments and singer, commissioned by and first performed at //hcmf
- The Secret Names (2020), for cello solo, 16-20 singers and handheld percussion, first performed by Robin Michael (cello) and the BBC Singers.
- Bhutani (2020), eight studies for solo piano, based on the names of animals in Sanskrit.
- Sky in a Small Cage (2024), an opera on the life and work of the 13th-century poet Rumi.
