= Elaine Mitchener =

British experimental singer

Elaine Samantha Mitchener MBE is a British-Caribbean experimental vocalist, composer, and movement artist. A member of the avant-garde group Apartment House and the electroacoustic act Rolling Calf. She attended the Trinity Laban Conservatoire of Music and Dance in London and was later mentored by opera singer Jacqueline Straubinger-Bremar. Her 2017 "cross-disciplinary music piece" Sweet Tooth debuted at St George's, Bloomsbury. Commissioned by the Bluecoat Arts Centre, the International Slavery Museum, and the Stuart Hall Foundation, it pertains to slavery in the British Empire, with a focus on the sugar industry. In 2021, she performed NAMES II—a "roll-call of the 2,000 enslaved African people owned by an 18th century Jamaican sugar planter"—at the British Art Show.

In 2026, Mitchener collaborated with London-based composer, artist and DJ Ain Bailey for Maybe It’s Because I’m A Londoner. The 6:30-minute audio work, commissioned by Art on the Underground, can be heard at Waterloo tube station along the moving walkway connecting the Northern and Jubilee lines.

Mitchener is an associate artist at Wigmore Hall until 2026. Mitchener was appointed Member of the Order of the British Empire (MBE) in the 2022 Birthday Honours for services to music.
