= Don't Call Us Dead =

2017 poetry collection by Danez Smith

- Author: Danez Smith
- Publication date: September 5, 2017
- Pages: 96
- Awards: Forward Prize for Best Collection
- ISBN: 978-1555977856
- Preceded by: Insert Boy
- Followed by: Homie

Don't Call Us Dead is a 2017 poetry collection by Danez Smith, published by Graywolf Press. Smith's second book of poems, it won the Forward Prize for Best Collection and was a finalist for the National Book Award for Poetry.

== Content ==
The book's poems address a myriad of topics similar to Smith's first collection, [insert] boy, including but not limited to police brutality, Black Lives Matter, general anti-blackness in the United States, and LGBTQ identity. It also addresses Smith's experiences as someone with HIV.

== Critical reception ==
Critics paid attention to Smith's poems about identity and oppression. Stephanie Burt, writing for the Academy of American Poets, liked Smith's method to that of Douglas Kearney and D. A. Powell among others. The Guardian compared Smith to a tradition of lyric poetry in America established by Walt Whitman, Allen Ginsberg, Amiri Baraka, and Langston Hughes. The reviewer specifically pointed out the sharpness of Smith's lyric when aimed at structural violence in the United States, specifically indicting recent incidents of police brutality. The Yale Review observed the more personal tone of Smith's poems regarding HIV alongside the broader political poems pertaining to police brutality, Black Lives Matter, and white supremacy. Lambda Literary analyzed the various kinds of violence which Smith sought to critique, later stating, "And, despite everything, there is a stream of love, tenderness, and nurturing running through this collection." The Kenyon Review said "The book as a whole is oppositional. It generates much of energy by revision and refusal" with regard to its dualities of state-sanctioned violence and personal affirmation of life. The Rumpus called the book "a historical commentary, a scientific document, a personal narrative, and a formal poetics" similar to works by Patricia Smith, Solmaz Sharif, and Claudia Rankine.
