= Beth Bachmann =

American poet

- Born: Pennsylvania, U.S.
- Occupation: Poet
- Writing career
- Notable works: Temper, Do Not Rise
- Notable awards: Kate Tufts Discovery Award, AWP Donald Hall Poetry Prize, PSA Alice Fay di Castagnola Award
- Website: www.bethbachmann.com

Beth Bachmann is an American poet.

Bachmann is Writer in Residence of creative writing at Vanderbilt University. Her poems have appeared in American Poetry Review, Kenyon Review, Antioch Review, AGNI, Prairie Schooner, Blackbird, Tin House, and Ploughshares. They are included in the textbook The Practice of Creative Writing (Bedford/St. Martin's).

== Biography ==
Bachmann was born and raised near Philadelphia, where her father, a non-combat veteran, worked as a shoe-shiner and locker-room attendant. Her first book, Temper, concerns the 1993 murder of her sister, an unsolved crime. She was educated at the Johns Hopkins University and Concordia University in Montreal. Each fall, she teaches in the MFA program at Vanderbilt University.

== Awards ==
- 2016 Guggenheim Fellowship, for "Cease"
- 2011 Poetry Society of America Alice Fay di Castagnola Award, for Do Not Rise
- 2010 Kate Tufts Discovery Award, for Temper
- 2008 AWP Donald Hall Poetry Prize, for Temper

== Works ==
- Do Not Rise, University of Pittsburgh Press, 2015, ISBN 978-0-8229-6328-8
- Temper, University of Pittsburgh Press, 2009, ISBN 978-0-8229-6040-9
- Evasion, Black Warrior Review Chapbook Series, 2008
- "Temper," From the Fishouse
- "Mystery Ending With a Girl in a Field", AGNI
- "Mystery of the Noise the Air Makes When Milled", AGNI
- "muse of arms," Poetry Society of America

=== Anthologies ===
- Best New Poets 2005 Editors George Garrett, Jeb Livingood, Samovar Press and Meridian, 2005, ISBN 978-0-9766296-0-3
- Best New Poets 2007 Editors Natasha Trethewey, Jeb Livingood, University of Virginia Press, 2007, ISBN 978-0-9766296-2-7
- Alice Redux: New Stories of Alice, Lewis and Wonderland, Editor Richard Peabody, Paycock, ISBN 0-931181-22-4

== Reviews ==
The work of Beth Bachmann has been compared to Alice Fulton: "the poems of both Fulton and Bachmann evince a humanity capacious, generous, courageous, and unafraid to make human beings real to one another, which is one great function of the humanities, and of poetry in particular." - Lisa Russ Spaar

Bachmann’s poems grabbed me because of their violence—was I just looking for it?—but it was a violence which was often implied, a sense of foreboding, a mood often just beneath the surface, rather than Wertmuller’s horrifying image of a family of ten being gunned down in a mass grave. And it’s not that I don’t like Wertmuller’s films—I do. I guess this particular evening I just wanted the striptease, not the naked body; the faint hint of heat, not the bottle of Tabasco. - D. A. Powell

metamorphosis, resonance, transformation, the alchemy of art. Bachmann is able-by a few simple, direct gestures...to connect her personal grief and tragedy to the whole tradition of English (and Western) verse and to the poetic impulse itself to make beauty out of sorrow. - A.E. Stallings

formidable...mind-boggling...absolutely tonic...when George Herbert wrote about temper he meant that process by which metals are beaten and burned and subjected to dire extremity so as to gain their supple resilience and serviceable strength. That is the work these poems do. - Linda Gregerson

Restraint and abandon ride side-by-side through these fiercely distilled poems-again and again they bear reluctant witness to the shadows hovering around the edges of every moment. Temper starts with an evocation of a mystery-an empty train station, the words of a last phone call, a sister's body beside the tracks. Move closer. I want to tell you a story, the poet murmurs alluringly, as if to implicate us in the crime. A beautiful unease suffuses these poems-they make me aware I'm alive, and certain of nothing. A stunning debut. - Nick Flynn
