= The Kingsley and Kate Tufts Poetry Awards =

Poetry awards based at Claremont Graduate University

- Location: Claremont, California
- Country: United States
- Presented by: Claremont Graduate University
- First award: 1993/1994
- Website: The Kingsley and Kate Tufts Poetry Awards

The Kingsley and Kate Tufts Poetry Awards are a pair of American prizes based at Claremont Graduate University. They are given to poets for their collections of poetry written in the English language, by a citizen or legal resident alien of the United States.

The Kingsley Tufts Poetry Award is a $100,000 prize presented to a mid-career, emerging poet who already possesses an established body of work. The Kingsley Tufts award is known to be one of the world's most lucrative poetry prizes.

Its counterpart, the Kate Tufts Discovery Award, is given to a poet who demonstrates genuine promise in their first book of published poetry, with an attached purse of $10,000.

== History ==
=== Kingsley Tufts Poetry Award ===
Young Kingsley Tufts

Kingsley Tufts held executive positions in the Los Angeles shipyards and wrote poetry as his avocation. His poetry has been featured in The New Yorker, Esquire, and Harpers, among other publications.

Following his death in 1991, Kingsley's wife, Kate, sold her home and the majority of the couple's estate in order to fund an endowment to help poets further their craft. She established the Kingsley Tufts Poetry Award in 1993 at Claremont Graduate University in Claremont, California.

Initially, the award was for $50,000, and has subsequently doubled due to increases in the endowment. It is intended for an emerging poet who is past the very beginning but has not yet reached the acknowledged pinnacle of their career.

Kate Tufts had no prior affiliation with Claremont Graduate University, but when she met then-university President John Maguire and visited the campus, she became convinced that it was the perfect home for her poetry prize.

Unlike many literary awards, which are coronations for a successful career or body of work, the Kingsley Tufts award was created to both honor the poet and provide the resources that allow artists to continue working.

Kate Tufts said she wanted to create a prize "that would enable a poet to work on his or her craft for a while without paying bills."

=== The Kate Tufts Discovery Award ===
Kate Tufts

In 1994, just a year after the inauguration of the Kingsley Tufts Poetry Award, Kate Tufts founded the Kate Tufts Discovery Award, which began in the amount of $5,000, but has since doubled to $10,000.

Kate Tufts died in June 1997, at the age of 86. While she did not live to see her awards grow to become some of the largest poetry prizes in the world, she certainly took pride in their inception while she was alive.

Doug Anderson, 1995 Kate Tufts Discovery Award recipient, remembers her sardonic wit when meeting her that year: "She came into the room at the Claremont Graduate School grumbling that she couldn't smoke in there, and then she stopped and looked at Tom Lux [that year's Kingsley Tufts award recipient] and myself. Kate Tufts looked at us and said, 'You don't know how glad I am that this year's awards were given to a couple of really disreputable poets.'"

== Judging ==
Both awards go through two phases of judging. A preliminary panel of three judges screens the approximately 400 combined applications that are received for both awards. They then pass on finalists to the final judges.

The final panel is composed of five distinguished judges, representing a cross-section of the American poetry community.

=== 2025 ===
The panel of final judges for the 2025 Kingsley and Kate Tufts Poetry Awards is:

- Donika Kelly, poet and associate professor at University of Iowa
- Ellen Bass, poet, writer, and writing teacher
- Tomás Q. Morín, poet and professor at Rice University
- Divya Victor, poet and professor at Michigan State University
- Major Jackson, poet and professor at Vanderbilt University

=== 2020 ===
The panel of final judges for the 2020 Kingsley and Kate Tufts Poetry Awards is:

- Timothy Donnelly (chair), poet, associate professor at Columbia University, and previous editor of Boston Review
- Cathy Park Hong, poet, poetry editor at The New Republic, and professor at Rutgers University–Newark
- Meghan O'Rourke, poet, essayist, memoirist, and editor of The Yale Review
- Luis J. Rodriguez, poet, writer, and founding editor of Tia Chucha Press
- Sandy Solomon, poet and teacher at Vanderbilt University

=== 2019 ===
The panel of final judges for the 2019 Kingsley and Kate Tufts Poetry Awards is:

- Timothy Donnelly (chair), poet, associate professor at Columbia University, and previous editor of Boston Review
- Cathy Park Hong, poet, poetry editor at The New Republic, and professor at Rutgers University–Newark.
- Khadijah Queen, poet, playwright, and assistant professor at the University of Colorado at Boulder.
- Luis J. Rodriguez, poet, writer, and founding editor of Tia Chucha Press
- Sandy Solomon, poet and teacher at Vanderbilt University

=== 2017 ===
The panel of final judges for the 2017 Kingsley and Kate Tufts Poetry Awards is:

- Don Share (chair), poet and editor of Poetry
- Elena Karina Byrne, poet, poetry curator/moderator for the Los Angeles Times Festival of Books
- Terrance Hayes, 2000 Kate Tufts Discovery Award recipient, poet, and professor at the University of Pittsburgh
- Meghan O'Rourke, poet, essayist, editor, and literary critic
- Brian Kim Stefans, poet and professor of English at University of California, Los Angeles

=== 2012 ===
The panel of final judges for the 2012 Kingsley and Kate Tufts Poetry Awards is:

- Linda Gregerson, poet, professor at the University of Michigan, and past Kingsley Tufts Poetry Award recipient
- David Barber, poet, poetry editor of The Atlantic Monthly
- Kate Gale, poet, novelist, managing editor of Red Hen Press
- Ted Genoways, award-winning poet and Editor of the Virginia Quarterly Review
- Carl Phillips, poet, professor at Washington University in St. Louis, and past Kingsley Tufts Poetry Award recipient

The panel of preliminary judges for the 2012 competition includes:

- Jericho Brown, poet, assistant professor of English at the University of San Diego
- Andrew Feld, poet, editor of the Seattle Review, and assistant professor at the University of Washington
- Jennifer Chang, poet, assistant professor of creative writing at Bowling Green State University

=== Distinguished past judges ===
- Paul Muldoon, Pulitzer Prize for Poetry winner, and poetry editor of The New Yorker
- Robert Pinsky, poet, past Poet Laureate Consultant in Poetry to the Library of Congress, and poetry editor at Slate
- Charles Harper Webb, Guggenheim Fellowship recipient in 2001, and professor at California State University, Long Beach

== Submission requirements/deadlines ==
Submissions are due annually on July 1, and eligible work has to have been published the previous year (between July and June). Manuscripts, CDs, and chapbooks are not accepted.

== Awards ceremony ==
Award winners are announced in the February following the July deadline, with a ceremony and presentation of the awards in April, national poetry month. The ceremony takes place on the Claremont Graduate University Campus, and winners are required to accept their award in person.

Distinguished speakers at the Awards Ceremony have included Kathy Bates in 2002, Leonard Nimoy in 2007, and Maxine Hong Kingston in 2012.

== Restrictions ==
A single work may be submitted for either award only once, although the winner of the Kate Tufts Discovery Award may submit another work in a later year for the Kingsley Tufts Poetry Award.

The Kingsley Tufts Poetry Award winner, by accepting the award, agrees to spend one week in residence at Claremont Graduate University for lectures and poetry readings in Claremont and the greater Los Angeles area.

The poet must be an American citizen or legal resident alien of the United States.

== Winners ==
Year	Kingsley Tufts Poetry Award	Kate Tufts Discovery Award	Ref.
2025	Jaswinder Bolina — English as a Second Language	Ariana Benson — Black Pastoral	
2024	Paisley Rekdal — West: A Translation	Jacqui Germain — Bittering the Wound	
2023	Roger Reeves — Best Barbarian	Robert Wood Lynn — Mothman Apologia	
2022	Divya Victor — Curb	torrin a. greathouse — Wound from the Mouth of a Wound	
2021	John Murillo — Kontemporary Amerikan Poetry	Jake Skeets — Eyes Bottle Dark with a Mouthful of Flowers	
2020	Ariana Reines — A Sand Book	Tiana Clark — I Can't Talk About the Trees Without the Blood	
2019	Dawn Lundy Martin — Good Stock Strange Blood	Diana Khoi Nguyen — Ghost Of	
2018	Patricia Smith — Incendiary Art	Donika Kelly — Bestiary	
2017	Vievee Francis — Forest Primeval	Phillip B. Williams — Thief in the Interior	
2016	Ross Gay — Catalog of Unabashed Gratitude	Danez Smith — [insert] boy	
2015	Angie Estes — Enchantée	Brandon Som — The Tribute Horse	
2014	Afaa M. Weaver — The Government of Nature	Yona Harvey — Hemming the Water	
2013	Marianne Boruch — The Book of Hours	Heidy Steidlmayer — Fowling Piece	
2012	Timothy Donnelly — The Cloud Corporation	Katherine Larson — Radial Symmetry	
2011	Chase Twichell — Horses Where the Answers Should Have Been	Atsuro Riley — Romey's Order	
2010	D. A. Powell — Chronic	Beth Bachmann — Temper	
2009	Matthea Harvey — Modern Life	Matthew Dickman — All-American Poem	
2008	Tom Sleigh — Space Walk	Janice N. Harrington — Even the Hollow My Body Made is Gone	
2007	Rodney Jones — Salvation Blues	Eric McHenry — Potscrubber Lullabies	
2006	Lucia Perillo — Luck Is Luck	Christian Hawkey — The Book of Funnels	
2005	Michael Ryan — New and Selected Poems	Patrick Phillips — Chattahoochee	
2004	Henri Cole — Middle Earth	Adrian Blevins — The Brass Girl Brouhaha	
2003	Linda Gregerson — Waterborne	Joanie Mackowski —The Zoo	
2002	Carl Phillips — The Tether	Cate Marvin — World's Tallest Disaster	
2001	Alan Shapiro — The Dead Alive and Busy	Jennifer Clarvoe — Invisible Tender	
2000	Robert Wrigley — Reign of Snakes	Terrance Hayes — Muscular Music	
1999	B.H. Fairchild — The Art of the Lathe	Barbara Ras — Bite Every Sorrow	
1998	John Koethe — Falling Water	Charles Harper Webb — Reading the Water	
1997	Campbell McGrath — Spring Comes to Chicago	Lucia Perillo — The Body Mutinies	
1996	Deborah Digges — Rough Music	Barbara Hamby — Delirium	
1995	Thomas Lux — Split Horizon	Doug Anderson — The Moon Reflected Fire	
1994	Yusef Komunyakaa — Neon Vernacular	Catherine Bowman —1-800-HOT-RIBS	
1993	Susan Mitchell — Rapture	Not Awarded	
