= Jennifer Clarvoe =

American poet

Jennifer S. Clarvoe
- Education: Princeton University, University of California, Berkeley
- Writing career
- Genre: Poetry

Jennifer S. Clarvoe is an American poet and English professor at Kenyon College. She has published two books of poetry, Invisible Tender and Counter-Amores. She won the Kate Tufts Discovery Award in 2001.

== Education and career ==
Clarvoe received her B.A. from Princeton University in 1983. She earned her Ph.D. from the University of California, Berkeley in 1993.

She has taught English at Kenyon College since 1990.

Her work has appeared in The Antioch Review, AGNI, The Yale Review, Partisan Review, and The Ohio Review.

Clarvoe published her first collection of poetry, Invisible Tender, in 2000. Essayist Jane Satterfield wrote that her lines were "[e]dgy as often as lyrical, formal as they are free (Clarvoe relishes, for instance, variations on the sestina)." Poet Laura Sims wrote in the Boston Review that Clarvoe's "vision of progression, tied up with childhood memories and marked by the 'fall' into adulthood, is highly personalized. The early poems of Invisible Tender serve as close studies of childhood events; their glance is backward, but the past is reclaimed in new form, allowing forward movement. These poems also acknowledge loss (of memory, of family ties, etc.), and in the course of each poem these losses are transformed into gifts, albeit imperfect ones." The collection earned her the Kate Tufts Discovery Award in 2001.

In 2011 she published her second book of poetry, Counter-Amores. Each of the poems in the collection is a reversal of Ovid's elegies from Amores. She was the November 2016 James Merrill House writer-in-residence.

== Awards ==
- 2002-2003 Rome Prize in Literature by the American Academy of Arts and Letters, which allowed her to spend the year writing at the American Academy in Rome.
- Poets Out Loud Prize, for Invisible Tender
- 2001 Kate Tufts Discovery Award, for Invisible Tender

== Works ==
=== Poetry ===
- "Day of Needs". Slate. February 19, 2002.
- Kinsella, John (July 2003). "Pelt of Unwant". Salt. 17 (1). ISBN 978-1-84471-006-5.
- Invisible Tender. Fordham Univ Press. 2000. ISBN 978-0-8232-2090-8. OCLC 833734326.
- Counter-Amores. Chicago : The University of Chicago Press, 2011. ISBN 9780226109282, OCLC 666491990
