= Robert Wood Lynn =

American poet

- Education: University of Mary Washington (BA), University of Virginia School of Law (JD), New York University (MFA)
- Occupation: poet
- Writing career
- Language: English
- Notable work: Mothman Apologia (2022)
- Notable awards: Yale Younger Poets Prize (2021), Kate Tufts Discovery Award (2022)

Robert Wood Lynn is an American poet. His debut collection, Mothman Apologia, earned him the Yale Younger Poets Prize and the Kate Tufts Discovery Award. He teaches poetry at Juilliard and lives in Rockbridge County, Virginia and New York City.

== Biography and career ==
Lynn was born in Virginia. He received a Juris Doctor (JD) from the University of Virginia School of Law, and later completed a Master of Fine Arts (MFA) in Poetry at New York University.

In 2021, series judge Rae Armantrout selected Lynn’s first book of poems, Mothman Apologia, for the Yale Series of Younger Poets while Lynn was still a student at New York University’s poetry MFA program. Mothman Apologia was listed as a “Best Poetry Book of 2022” by the New York Times and a “Best Book of 2022” by the New York Public Library. New York Times poetry critic Elisa Gabbert described Lynn’s work as “both elegiac and witty.” Lynn won the 2023 Kate Tufts Discovery Award for Mothman Apologia and the 2023 Indiana Review Poetry Prize for his poem “Kings County.”

Lynn has received fellowships from New York University, the James Merrill House and the National Endowment for the Arts.

== Published works ==
Lynn’s poems have appeared in publications such as American Poetry Review, The Atlantic, Poetry Magazine, and The Yale Review, among others.

Full-length poetry collections

- Mothman Apologia (Yale University Press, 2022)

Chapbooks

- How to Maintain Eye Contact (Button Poetry, 2023)

In anthologies

Lynn’s work has been included in the anthology The Southern Poetry Anthology, Volume IX: Virginia published by Texas Review Press.

== Honors and awards ==
Lynn’s recognition has included:

- 2023 National Endowment for the Arts Literature Fellowship in Poetry
- 2023 Kate Tufts Discovery Award
- 2021 Yale Series of Younger Poets Prize
