= Soft Science (disambiguation) =

Soft science is a subcategory of the scientific fields.

Soft Science may also refer to:

- Soft Science (EP), 2006 EP by Sproll
- Soft Science (poetry collection), 2019 poetry collection by Franny Choi
