= Franny Choi =

American writer and poet

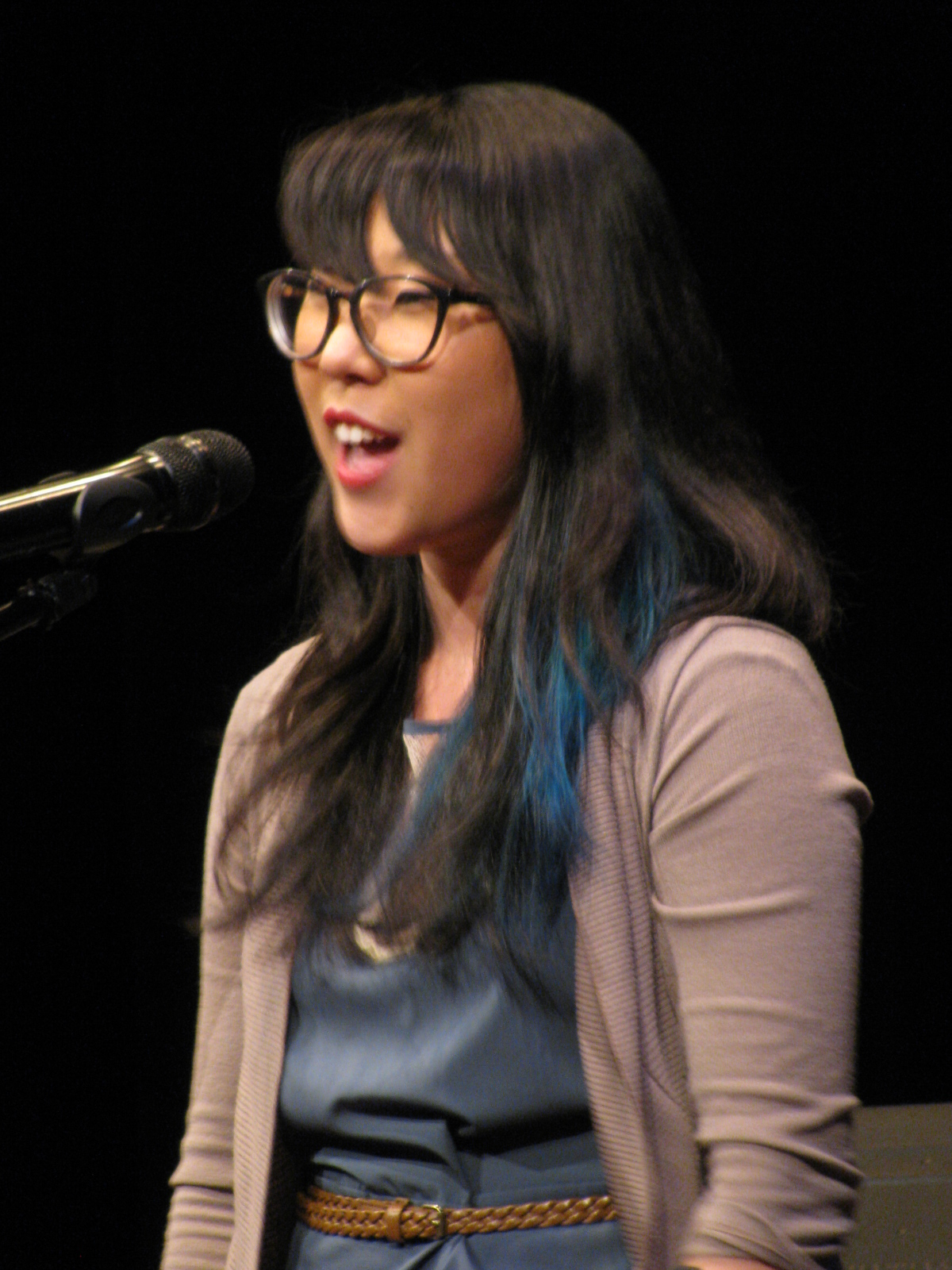
- Franny Choi performing at a poetry slam
- Born: February 11, 1989 (age 37)
- Education: University of Michigan
- Occupation: Poet
- Writing career
- Genre: Slam poetry

Franny Choi (born February 11, 1989) is an American writer, poet and playwright.

== Life ==
Choi uses she and they pronouns. She lived in Northampton, Massachusetts, and now resides in Greenfield, Massachusetts. Choi's parents are Choi Inyeong and Nam Songeun. She is Korean-American. In high school, Choi was introduced to the poetry of Allen Ginsberg and became interested in poetry's spoken form. In college, she joined a group for marginalized spoken poets, called WORD!, which was her introduction to slam poetry.

== Education and career ==
Choi graduated from Brown University with a Bachelor of Arts in Literary Arts and Ethnic Studies in 2011 and received a Master of Fine Arts in Poetry from the Helen Zell Writers' Program at the University of Michigan. After graduating, she became a co-director of the Providence Poetry Slam. She founded the Dark Noise Collective with Fatimah Asghar, Danez Smith, Jamila Woods, Nate Marshall, and Aaron Samuels in 2012.

Choi worked for Hyphen, a non-profit Asian-American culture magazine, as a senior editor. She was co-host, with Danez Smith, of the podcast VS. She was a Gaius Charles Bolin Fellow in English at Williams College; in 2022 she joined the undergraduate Literature Faculty at Bennington College.

=== Awards ===
Choi is a two-time winner of the Rustbelt Poetry Slam. In 2020, Soft Science won the Science Fiction & Fantasy Poetry Association's Elgin Award.

Franny Choi is the 2024–2026 Poet Laureate of Northampton, Massachusetts.

== Activism ==
Choi promotes social activism through her poetry and writing. In her poem "Whiteness Walks Into A Bar", she highlights institutionalized racism in the United States. Other poems, like "furiosa", focus on feminism. Choi curated a series of video poems by 12 queer Asian American and Pacific Islander poets for the Smithsonian Asian Pacific American Center.

A Kundiman Fellow and graduate of the VONA Workshop, she founded Brew & Forge, which is "an ongoing experiment in gathering writers, artists, organizers, and movement builders" whose "mission is to amplify the collective power of writers to alchemize dreaming and build capacity in movements for liberation, justice, and survival."

== Bibliography ==
=== Books ===
- Floating, Brilliant, Gone (Button Poetry, 2014)
- Soft Science (Alice James Books, 2019)
- The World Keeps Ending, and the World Goes On (Ecco Press, 2022)

=== Chapbooks ===
- Death by Sex Machine (Sibling Rivalry Press, 2017)
