= Divya Victor =

Poet

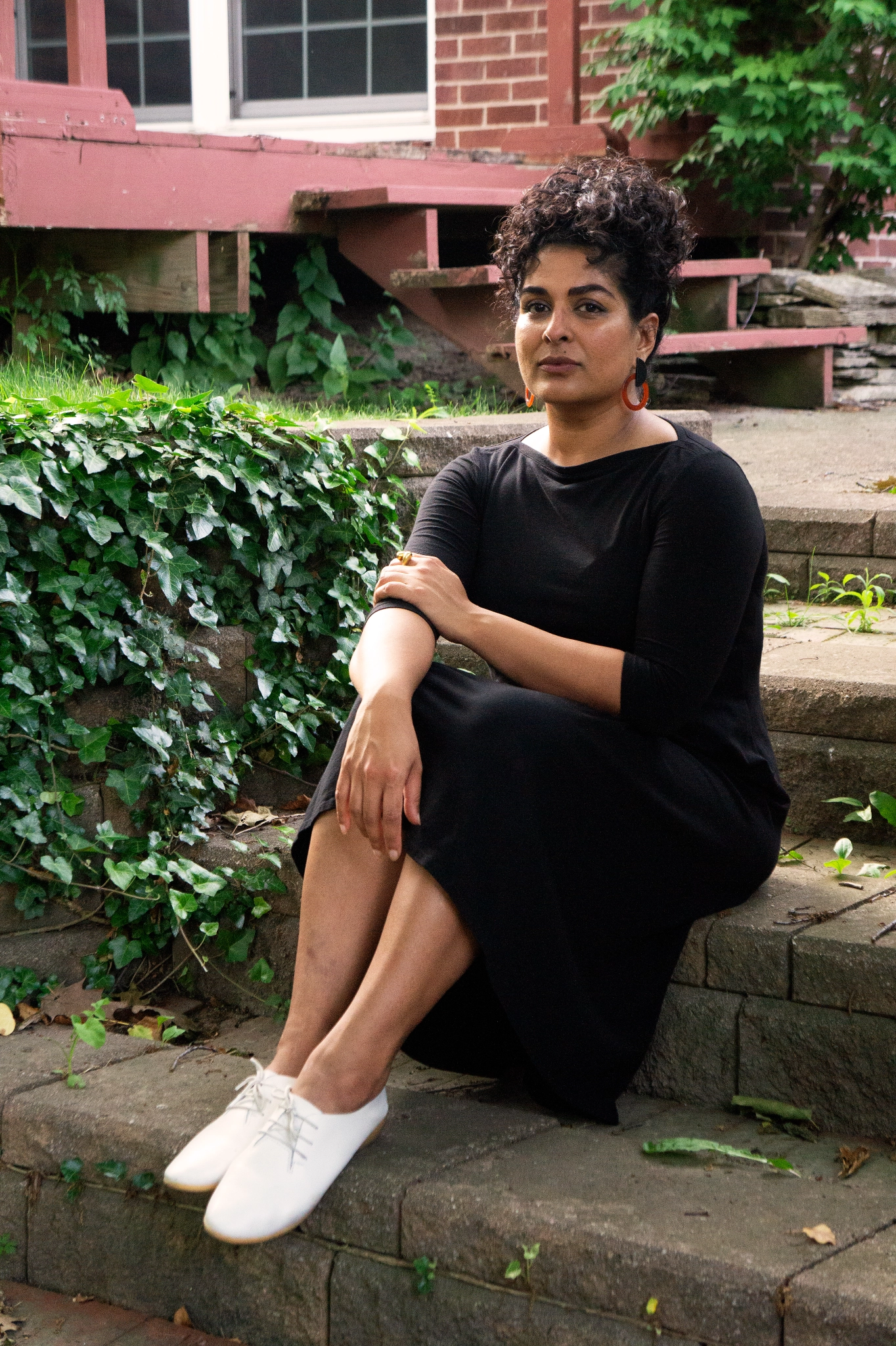
- Victor in 2020
- Occupations: Poet, Professor
- Notable work: CURB
- Awards: PEN America Open Book Award (2021); Kingsley Tufts Poetry Award (2021)

Divya Victor is a Tamil American poet and professor, known for her poetry book Curb which won the PEN Open Book Award.

== Early life and education ==
Divya Victor was born in Nagercoil, India.

Victor earned her B.S. in English from Towson University, her M.A. in creative writing (poetry) from Temple University, and her Ph.D. in English at University at Buffalo (SUNY).

Victor has taught at the University at Buffalo (SUNY) and Nanyang Technological University, which hosts Singapore's first Advanced Creative Writing Program. She has also served as the editor for Jacket2. She is currently based in East Lansing and is an associate professor at Michigan State University.

== Awards and recognition ==
Victor's CURB, won the PEN America Open Book Award and the Kingsley Tufts Poetry Award. Her earlier book, Natural Subjects, won the Bob Kaufman Award. In 2012 she won the Mark Diamond Research Fund Award from the University at Buffalo.

She has been a Riverrun Fellow at University of California San Diego's Archive for New Poetry, and a Writer in Residence at the Los Angeles Contemporary Exhibit (L.A.C.E.). MoCA Los Angeles, The National Gallery of Singapore, the L.A.C.E. and the MoMA have performed or installed her work.

== Critical reception ==
National Book Critics Circle board member Diego Báez has described Victor as a "globally minded, locally rooted, exceedingly brilliant poet." Mandana Chaffa, a National Book Critics Circle Fellow, describes her work as "a powerful political act" that is "yet it is first and foremost a poetic act, one that is not to be missed." Her book CURB has been described by Cathy Park Hong as "Layered, rich, and epic…incredible collection that must be read and re-read." Don Mee Choi called it "innovative…a powerful spell against empire's geography." Pen America's judges citation for the PEN Open Book Award describes Curb as "a remarkable book of poetry…a stunning historical document" and "brilliantly inventive."

Amitava Kumar, the Indian writer and journalist, has remarked that Victor's Kith describes "so well our locked destinies and, at the same time, perhaps because of their wit, or vitality, or compassion, deliver us into liberated zones of heightened consciousness."

== Select bibliography ==
=== Books ===
- Curb, Nightboat Books. 2021.
- Kith, Fence Books. 2017.
- Unsub, Insert Blanc. Los Angeles. 2015.
- Natural Subjects, Trembling Pillow. 2014.
- Things to Do with Your Mouth, Les Figues 2013.

=== Chapbooks and other short-form publications ===
- Scheingleichheit (German edition). de:Merve Verlag. 2020.
- Semblance (English edition). Sputnik and Fizzle Book. 2016.
- Reconfiliating: Conversations with Conceptual-Affiliated Writers. With an Afterword by Joseph Mosconi. Essay Press. 2015.
- Swift Taxidermies 1919-1922, Gauss PDF. 2014.
- Say Hello to Your Last Chapbook, with Mathias Svalina, New Lights Press. 2014.
- Partial Derivative of the Unnamable, Troll Thread. 2012.
- Goodbye, John! On John Baldessari, Gauss PDF. 2012.
- Punch, Gauss PDF. 2011.
- Partial Dictionary of the Unnamable, Troll Thread. 2011.
- Partial Directory of the Unnamable, Troll Thread. 2011.
- Hellocasts by Charles Reznikoff by Divya Victor by Vanessa Place, Ood Press. 2010.
- Sutures, Little Red Leaves. 2009.
