= A Sand Book =

2019 poetry collection by Ariana Reines

- First edition
- Author: Ariana Reines
- Genre: Poetry
- Publisher: Tin House
- Publication date: 2019

A Sand Book is a poetry collection published in 2019 by poet and writer Ariana Reines. Writing in The New Yorker, Hannah Aizenman referred to the collection as "[...] a psychedelic epic about climate change and forever war; capitalism and surveillance; gun violence and police brutality; fascism and genocide; diaspora, mental illness, gender, and the occult."

Reines won the 2020 Kingsley Tufts Poetry Award for the book. It was also longlisted for the National Book Award.
