= Triple Canopy (online magazine) =

American online magazine

- Format: Online magazine
- Founded: 2007
- Country: United States
- Based in: New York City
- Website: www.canopycanopycanopy.com

Triple Canopy is a New York-based "magazine" and 501(c)(3) nonprofit organization. Issues of the "magazine" are published online over the course of several months. Each issue focuses on specific questions and areas of concern, and features works of art and literature, conversations, performances, exhibitions, and books. Triple Canopy is dedicated to “sustained inquiry, careful reading and viewing, resisting and expanding the present.” In “The Binder and the Server,” a memoir-manifesto published in 2010, the editors proclaimed their intention to “slow down the internet”; subsequently, reflecting on the erosion of the line between “online” and “offline,” they shifted to “slow down the world.” Triple Canopy is certified by Working Artists and the Greater Economy (W.A.G.E.). Triple Canopy’s archive was acquired by the Fales Library and Special Collection at New York University.

== Overview ==
Founded as an editorial collective in 2007, Triple Canopy currently consists of a staff of editors, writers, artists, researchers, designers, and web developers based in New York, Los Angeles, San Francisco, Minneapolis, Mexico City, and Berlin. Triple Canopy's digital platform acts as the hub for publishing activities that occur online, in print, and as events and exhibitions. From the design of the platform to the editing of essays and artworks, Triple Canopy is meant to foster attentive reading, prolonged engagements—in opposition to the incessant distraction that characterizes the attention economy.

Due to the presentation of substantive, carefully edited material that is designed to be read and viewed online, and makes use of the characteristics of the browser, Triple Canopy's work has been referred to as "the sort of stuff people say is not happening on the internet." Triple Canopy draws on the legacy of avant-garde print magazines and journals, but also incorporates the history of new media publications such as the magazine-in-a-box Aspen, the audio cassette magazine Tellus, and the experimental publication Blast.

The central form for Triple Canopy’s publishing activities is the magazine issue. Issues may include digital works of art and literature, public conversations, books, editions, performances, and exhibitions. New issues are devoted to the collaborative production of bodies of knowledge around specific questions and concerns. Issues are published over the course of several months, often concurrently, at a rate of approximately three per year. As of December 2018, Triple Canopy has published twenty-five issues of the magazine and twelve books, and has worked with more than nine hundred contributors.

Triple Canopy has collectively authored works that have been presented by the Whitney Museum of American Art, the Museum of Modern Art (New York), MoMA PS1, MCA Denver, and Kunsthalle Wien, among other institutions. Triple Canopy creates open-source publishing systems that enable the magazine to elucidate relationships between activities that occur on the web, in print, and in person. Triple Canopy has organized numerous public programs and participated in residencies in New York, Los Angeles, Mexico City, Chicago, Tucson, Paris, Berlin, Sarajevo, Turin, and elsewhere. The magazine regularly organizes the Publication Intensive, a free two-week program in the history and contemporary practice of publication.

Triple Canopy’s office and venue is in Chinatown, Manhattan, shared with Electronic Arts Intermix. Until 2017, Triple Canopy shared a space in Greenpoint, Brooklyn, with film and electronic art venue Light Industry and open-source educational program The Public School New York. Triple Canopy's venue regularly hosts performances, lectures, screenings, talks, and other public events. The magazine also maintains an active presence in Berlin and Los Angeles.

== Critical response ==
The New York Times called Triple Canopy “a multitasking brain trust of a nonprofit that publishes an extremely smart Internet magazine”; in another article, in 2017, the paper declared that Triple Canopy “broke the mold of traditional Web design; instead of scrolling down, readers page left and right, which gives the work a framed look.… Their concept of ‘slowing down the Internet’ has come to seem prescient.” The New Yorker's Sasha Frere-Jones commented that "Triple Canopy may be a journal of high intellectual resolution, but it is also very easy to read on a computer screen." In a Financial Times article naming the five best art magazines, frieze editorial director Jennifer Higgie wrote that Triple Canopy “lets you watch videos, is not limited by word or page length, and can be read simultaneously by people anywhere in the world. In other words, it’s the future." In a note about David Graeber’s essay on the history of debt in issue 10, Bookforum praised the magazine for integrating the immersion of print with the immediacy of the internet. In 2012, Triple Canopy received the Art Journal Award for the best work to have appeared in Art Journal, published by the College Art Association, in the previous year (Triple Canopy’s contribution was “The Binder and the Server,” essay on the image and value of labor in contemporary publishing practices).

== Print publications ==
- Triple Canopy, ed., Invalid Format: An Anthology of Triple Canopy, Volume 1 (2012)
- Sarah Crowner, David Horvitz, and Ariana Reines, Miscellaneous Uncatalogued Material (2012)
- Triple Canopy, The Binder and the Server (2012)
- Triple Canopy, ed., Invalid Format: An Anthology of Triple Canopy, Volume 2 (2012)
- Triple Canopy, ed., Corrected Slogans: Reading and Writing Conceptualism (2013; second printing, 2015)
- Triple Canopy, ed., Invalid Format: An Anthology of Triple Canopy, Volume 3 (2014)
- K.D., Headless (2015; ebook, 2016)
- Triple Canopy, ed., Speculations (“The future is ______”) (2015)
- Triple Canopy and Ralph Lemon, eds., On Value (2015)
- Anna Della Subin, Not Dead But Sleeping (2016; ebook, 2015)
- Sowon Kwon, S as in Samsam (2017)
- Ulf Stolterfoht with Peter Dittmer, translated by Shane Anderson with Megan Ewing, The Amme Talks (2017)
- Hilton Als with Jennifer Krasinski, Andy Warhol: The Series (2017)

== Notable contributors ==
- Fatima Al Qadiri
- Hilton Als
- Cory Arcangel
- Kevin Beasley
- Mel Bochner
- Ted Chiang
- Joshua Cohen (writer)
- Gabriella Coleman
- Samuel R. Delany
- Renee Gladman
- Rivka Galchen
- David Graeber
- Lucy Ives
- Steffani Jemison
- Jon Kessler
- Katie Kitamura
- Josh Kline
- Wayne Koestenbaum
- Hari Kunzru
- Ralph Lemon
- David Levine
- Glenn Ligon
- Jill Magid
- Tom McCarthy
- Fred Moten
- Trevor Paglen
- William Pope.L
- Kameelah Janan Rasheed
- Ariana Reines
- Namwali Serpell
- Bob Stein (computer pioneer)
- Anna Della Subin
- Martine Syms
- Astra Taylor
- Lynne Tillman
- Mónica de la Torre
- Constance DeJong

== See also ==
- List of literary magazines
- List of art magazines
