= Soft Science (poetry collection) =

2019 poetry collection by Franny Choi

- First edition cover
- Author: Franny Choi
- Genre: Poetry
- Publisher: Alice James Books
- Publication date: 2019
- ISBN: 978-1-938584-99-2

Soft Science is a poetry collection published in 2019, written by poet and writer Franny Choi. It received positive reviews.

== Development ==
Many of the poems in Soft Science appear in Choi's 2017 chapbook Death by Sex Machine. Choi began the chapbook without "[...] really [knowing] what it might turn into". Choi has also said she drew inspiration for the collection from a series of poems she wrote about the character Kyoko from the 2015 science fiction film Ex Machina though only one of the Kyoko poems appears in Soft Science. Choi has referred to the Kyoko poems as "bay leaf" poems. Borrowed by Danez Smith, the term indicates the poems were necessary to "get things going" but not necessary for inclusion in the final version of the book. Choi faced moments of "self-doubt" as she wrote the book.

== Themes ==
The collection deals with technology and language's relationship with technology, as well as themes of identity. In Fields Magazine, Shannon Austin commented on the collection's treatment of language, writing that Choi "[...] plays with language, manipulating typical definitions, sentence structures, and grammatical rules in order to reject what we have come to think of as the norm".

== Reception ==
Writing for Lambda Literary, July Westhale praised Choi's language as "lyric and logical". In 2020, Soft Science won the Science Fiction & Fantasy Poetry Association's Elgin Award.
