= Ariana Reines =

American writer

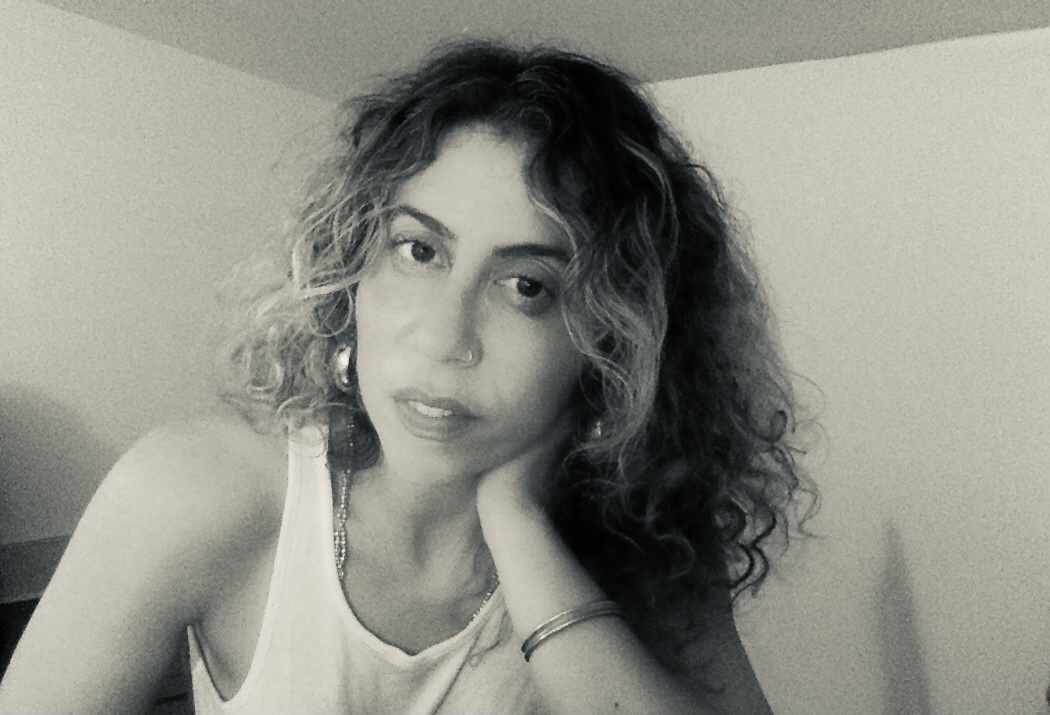

Ariana Reines (born 1982) is an American poet, playwright, performance artist, and translator. Her books of poetry include The Cow (2006), which won the Alberta Prize from Fence Books; Coeur de Lion (2007); Mercury (2011); Thursday (2012) and A Sand Book (2019), which was longlisted for the National Book Award. She has taught at UC Berkeley (Roberta C. Holloway Lecturer in Poetry, 2009), Columbia University (2013), The New School (2013), and Tufts University (2014). Reines has been described by Michael Silverblatt of NPR's Bookworm as "one of the crucial voices of her generation." She describes the subject matter of her work as "bearing witness to the search for the sacred in the 21st century."

Her play Telephone was commissioned and produced by The Foundry Theatre, and presented at the Cherry Lane Theatre in February 2009, with two Obie wins. She participated in the 2014 Whitney Biennial as a member of Semiotext(e). Her performance collaboration with Jim Fletcher, Mortal Kombat, was presented at Le Mouvement in Biel/Bienne, Switzerland, in August 2014, and was again presented at the Whitney Museum of American Art in October 2014.

== Biography ==
Reines was born on October 24, 1982, in Salem, Massachusetts. She said that the Salem Witch Trials were relevant in her writing, saying "I am sure that Salem's history has influenced me in every way. I know that there still lurks in me the fear that if I speak the truth as I know it, I will be locked up in a mental institution and then killed in public while a mockery of me is made." In college, she studied English literature and French, and graduated summa cum laude from Barnard College. She completed graduate work at both Columbia University and the European Graduate School, where she studied literature, performance, and philosophy. In 2010, she served as a translator on a UN Mission to Haiti.

== Works ==
=== The Cow ===
The Cow (Fence Books, 2006) addresses themes of abjection, filth, and disgust. It is framed by several excerpted texts, including a guide to bovine carcass disposal, as well as the Bible, and works by Gertrude Stein, Charles Baudelaire, and Marguerite Duras, a structure which Reines has described as "passing all of literature through a hamburger helper." Of the titular figure, Reines has claimed that "the cow is a real modernist figure. I feel like after God died, the cow became the onlooker in great works of modernism...it's like the residue of the divine in the twentieth century." Reines' writing style in The Cow has been described as one that "appropriates and shreds other texts, but which sometimes hides the theft; a search for beauty under piles of carcasses both metaphorical and real"; the same review pointed out that "in the context of such fraught, relentless hammering, such brief moments of beauty can risk seeming like desperately mimed cliches."

=== Coeur de Lion ===
Coeur de Lion (Mal-o-Mar, 2007; reissued by Fence Books, 2011) is a book-length poem addressed to an elusive, fractured, "you," who Reines has stated constitutes "the 'you' of YouTube and advertising...what the impoverished 'I' is made of." It depicts the unravelling of a love affair between the narrator and this addressee. The title is a twin reference to King Richard the Lionheart, as well as the brand of camembert.

=== Telephone ===
Telephone was performed at the Cherry Lane Theatre in February 2009. It is based on The Telephone Book: Technology — Schizophrenia — Electric Speech by philosopher Avital Ronell, and has been described as an "inspired and utterly original new tone poem of a play" and "not for everyone". Telephone consists of three sections: one recreates the first ever phone call, between Alexander Graham Bell and Thomas Watson; the second is centered on Ms. St., a patient of Carl Jung who believed she had a telephone inside of her; the third brings the three characters together. The play won two Obie Awards, one for Birgit Huppuch's performance as Ms. St., and another for Ken Rus Schmoll as director. The second act of Telephone was expanded into a short piece entitled Miss St.'s Hieroglyphic Suffering, and was presented as part of The Guggenheim Museum's Works & Process series in November 2009, again starring Birgit Huppuch.

=== Mercury ===
Mercury (Fence Books, 2011) consists of several intermeshed long poems. Its five sections each begin with alchemical symbols, which, according to B. K. Fisher, writing for the Boston Review, places the reader "in a realm where the transmutation of materials is an analogy for personal purification and esoteric or spiritual quest." Reines has stated that Mercury is "a ground, a field, a structure in which the poems can resonate together as much more than merely themselves."

=== A Sand Book ===
A Sand Book (Tin House, 2019) is a psychedelic meditation on climate change, violence, peacocks, Paul Celan, surveillance, the sun, the occult, Judaism, time travel, the dissolution of language, and more. It consists of twelve sections of poems and ends with "Mosaic," a transmission from the sun. A Sand Book was longlisted for the National Book Award.

== Teaching ==
Reines has taught at Tufts University, Columbia University, The New School, and The Jack Kerouac School of Disembodied Poetics at Naropa University. In 2009, she was the youngest ever Roberta C. Holloway Lecturer in Poetry at University of California at Berkeley. In addition, Reines has taught workshops in many non-institutional settings, such as Poets House and the Poetry Project. In the fall of 2012, and again in 2013, she led a workshop called Ancient Evenings, which facilitated a communion around ancient texts.

In 2012, Reines led a vision quest in New Mexico.

== Bibliography ==
=== Poetry collections ===
- The Cow (Fence Books, 2006)
- Coeur de Lion (Mal-O-Mar, 2007; reissued by Fence, 2011)
- Mercury (Fence Books, 2011)
- Thursday (Spork, 2012)
- Beyond Relief (with Celina Su, Belladonna*, 2013)
- The Origin Of The World (Semiotext(e), 2014)
- Ramayana (The Song Cave, 2015)
- Tiffany's Poems (The Song Cave, 2015)
- A Sand Book (Tin House, 2019)
- The Rose (Graywolf Press, 2025)

=== Plays ===
- Telephone (2009)
- Miss St.'s Hieroglyphic Suffering (2009)
- Lorna (2013) with Jim Fletcher

=== Performance ===
- The Poetry Brothel (Poetry Society of New York, 2008)
- The Origin of the World (2014)
- Mortal Kombat (with Jim Fletcher, 2014)

=== Anthologies ===
- Gurlesque (Saturnalia, 2010)
- Against Expression (Northwestern University Press, 2011)
- Miscellaneous Uncatalogued Materials (Triple Canopy/MoMA, 2011)
- Corrected Slogans: Reading and Writing Conceptualism (Triple Canopy, 2013)
- Spells: 21st-Century Occult Poetry (Ignota Books, 2018)

=== Translations ===
- The Little Black Book of Grisélidis Réal: Days and Nights of an Anarchist Whore by Jean-luc Henning (Semiotext(e), 2009)
- My Heart Laid Bare by Charles Baudelaire (Mal-O-Mar, 2009)
- Preliminary Materials for a Theory of the Young-Girl by Tiqqun (Semiotext(e), 2012)

=== Catalogues and contributions ===
- Animal Shelter 1 (Animal Shelter, 2008)
- "The Air We Breathe" (San Francisco Museum of Modern Art, 2011)
- Oscar Tuazon: Die (The Power Station, 2012)
- Parkett no. 91 (Parkett Verlag, 2012)
- Better Homes (SculptureCenter, 2013)
- Introduction to Cunt Norton by Dodie Bellamy (Les Figues Press, 2013)
- Yana Toyber: This Time (Damiani, 2015)
- The Passion According to Carol Rama (Museu d'Art Contemporani de Barcelona, 2015)

== Awards ==
- Phi Beta Kappa Society, Barnard College, 2002
- Winner of the Alberta Prize for "The Cow", 2006
- Judge of the National Poetry Series, 2013
- Fellow at the Center for the Humanities at Tufts University, 2014
- Kingsley Tufts Poetry Award for A Sand Book, 2020
