= Henri Cole =

American poet (born 1956)

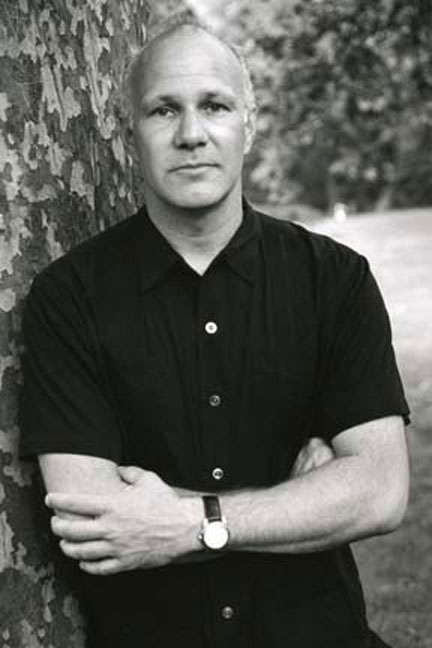
- Born: May 9, 1956 (age 70); Fukuoka, Japan
- Education: College of William and Mary (BA); University of Wisconsin, Milwaukee (MA); Columbia University (MFA)
- Occupation: Poet

Henri Cole (born May 9, 1956) is an American poet, who has published many collections of poetry and a memoir. His books have been translated into French, Spanish, Italian, German, and Arabic.

== Biography ==
Henri Cole was born in Fukuoka, Japan, to an American father and French-Armenian mother, and raised in Virginia, United States. His father, a North Carolinian, enlisted in the service after graduating from high school and, while stationed in Marseille, met Cole's mother, who worked at the PX. Together they lived in Japan, Germany, Illinois, California, Nevada, Missouri and Virginia, where Cole attended public schools and the College of William and Mary. He has published twelve collections of poetry in English.

From 1982 until 1988 he was executive director of The Academy of American Poets. Since that time he has held many teaching positions and been artist-in-residence at various institutions, including Brandeis University, Columbia University, Davidson College, Harvard University, Ohio State University, Reed College, Smith College, The College of William and Mary, and Yale University. He has collaborated with the visual artists Jenny Holzer and Kiki Smith. And from 2010 to 2014, he was poetry editor of The New Republic. Cole currently teaches at Claremont McKenna College.

== Books of poetry ==
- 2025: The Other Love, New York: Farrar, Straus & Giroux
- 2023: Gravity and Center (Selected Sonnets, 1994-2022), New York: Farrar, Straus & Giroux
- 2023: Blizzard (German translation by Henning Ahrens), Munich: Hanser Verlag, Edition Lyrik Kabinett
- 2021: Der sichtbare Mensch, Ausgewählte Gedicht (German translation by Hans Raimund), Vienna: Löcker
- 2020: Blizzard, New York: Farrar, Straus & Giroux
- 2015: Nothing to Declare, New York: Farrar, Straus & Giroux
- 2015: Le Merle, Le Loup suivi de Toucher (French translation by Claire Malroux), Paris: Le bruit du temps
- 2011: Touch, New York: Farrar, Straus & Giroux
- 2011: Terre Médiane (French translation by Claire Malroux), Paris: Le bruit du temps
- 2010: Mirlo y Lobo (Spanish translation by Eduardo López Truco), Cantabria: Quálea Editorial
- 2010: Autoritratto con Gatti (Italian translation by Massimo Bacigalupo), Parma: Guanda Editore
- 2010: Pierce the Skin (Selected Poems, 1982-2007), New York: Farrar, Straus & Giroux
- 2008: La Apariencia de la Cosas (Spanish translation by Eduardo López Truco), Cantabria: Quálea Editorial
- 2007: Blackbird and Wolf, New York: Farrar, Straus & Giroux
- 2005: Vingt-Deux Poèmes (French translation by Claire Malroux), Paris: Yvon Lambert
- 2003: Middle Earth, New York: Farrar, Straus & Giroux
- 1998: The Visible Man, New York: Farrar, Straus & Giroux
- 1995: The Look of Things
- 1989: The Zoo Wheel of Knowledge
- 1986: The Marble Queen

== Books of prose ==
- 2020: باريس الأورفيّة: السّياحة الأدبية في باريس (Orphic Paris, Arabic translation by Amani Lazar), United Arab Emirates: Rewayat Books
- 2018: Orphic Paris, New York, New York Review Books
- 2018: Paris-Orphée (French translation by Claire Malroux), Paris: Le bruit du temps

== Awards and honors ==
- 2026 — National Book Critics Circle Award, Finalist in Poetry for The Other Love
- 2021 — James Merrill House, Writer-in-Residence
- 2017 — American Academy of Arts and Letters, Elected Member
- 2016 — American Academy of Arts and Letters, Award of Merit Medal in Poetry
- 2014 — Radcliffe Institute for Advanced Study at Harvard, Fellow
- 2012 — The Thom Gunn Award for Poetry for Touch, Publishing Triangle
- 2012 — The Jackson Poetry Prize, Poets & Writers
- 2011 — Harvard University Phi Beta Kappa poet
- 2011 — Los Angeles Times Book Award, Finalist in Poetry for Pierce the Skin (Selected Poems 1982-2007)
- 2010 — American Academy of Arts & Sciences, elected member
- 2009 — Sara Teasdale Award in Poetry, Wellesley College
- 2009 — National Endowment for the Arts Literature Fellowship
- 2008 — Lenore Marshall Poetry Prize for Blackbird and Wolf, Academy of American Poets
- 2008 — Ambassador Book Award in Poetry for Blackbird and Wolf, English-Speaking Union of the United States
- 2008 — Massachusetts Book Award in Poetry for Blackbird and Wolf
- 2008 — Lambda Literary Award in Poetry for Blackbird and Wolf
- 2007 — United States Artists USA Hildreth/Williams Fellow, Literature
- 2004 — Kingsley Tufts Poetry Award for Middle Earth
- 2004 — John Simon Guggenheim Memorial Foundation Fellowship
- 2004 — Award in Literature, American Academy of Arts and Letters
- 2004 — Pulitzer Prize, Finalist in Poetry for Middle Earth
- 2004 — Los Angeles Times Book Award, Finalist in Poetry for Middle Earth
- 2004 — Massachusetts Book Award in Poetry for Middle Earth
- 2001 — Japan-United States Friendship Commission, Creative Artist Fellowship
- 2000 — Berlin Prize, American Academy in Berlin
- 1995 — Rome Prize in Literature, American Academy of Arts and Letters
- 1993 — National Endowment for the Arts Literature Fellowship
- 1989 — Amy Lowell Poetry Travelling Scholarship
- 1989 — Camargo Foundation Fellowship
- 1985 — Ingram Merrill Foundation Award (also 1990)

== Personal life ==
Cole is openly gay, though in his early work he turned to "nature as a mask for writing about private feelings." He came out as he "felt a need to speak as a gay man, since until recently we were not encouraged by society to love one another, marry, and have children. So if I have an ethics, it is simply to be true, but never at the expense of original language."
