= Vanessa Place =

American poet

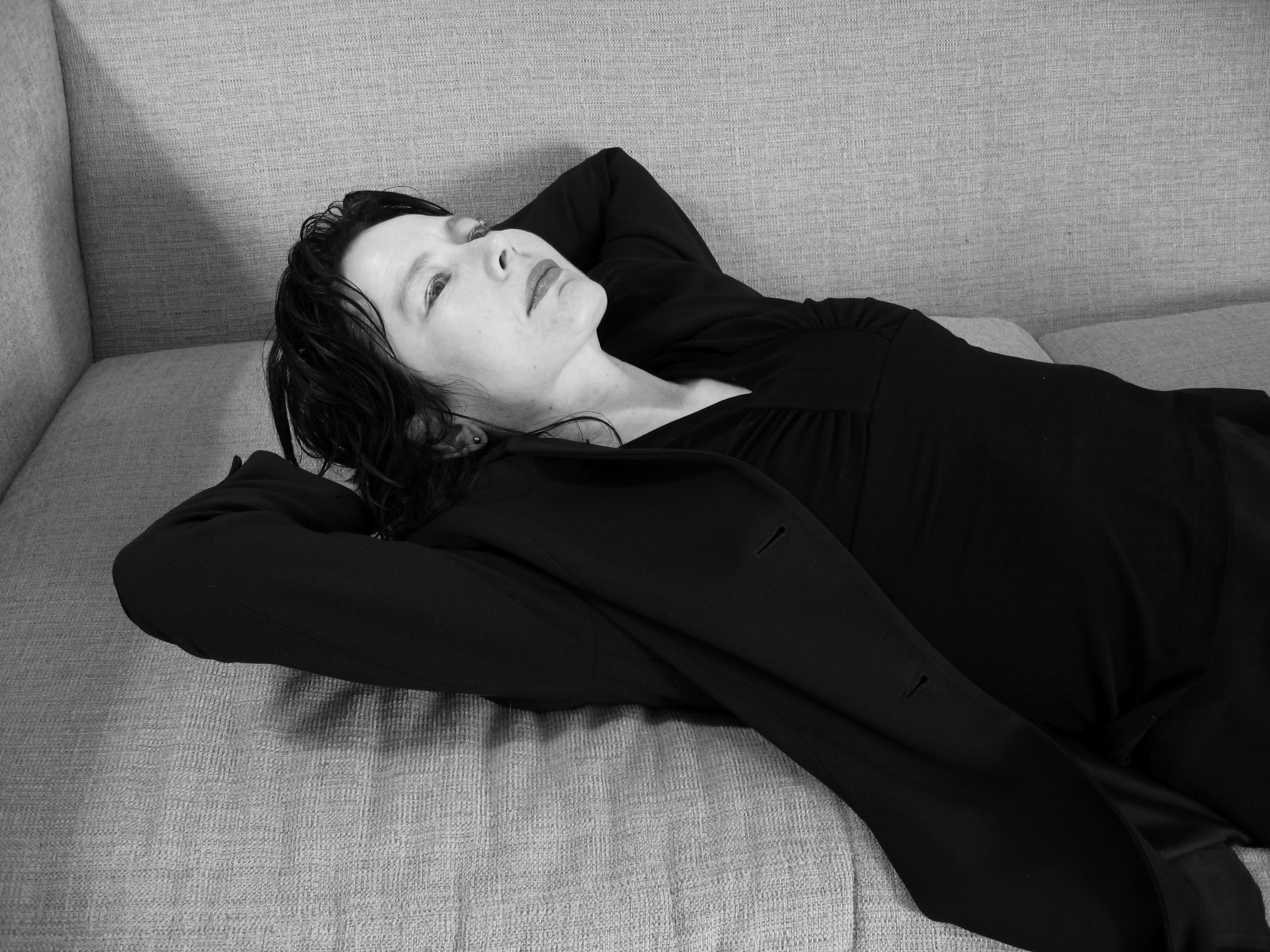
- Born: May 10, 1968 (age 58); United States
- Occupations: Novelist; poet; lawyer
- Writing career
- Notable works: La Medusa, Tragodia, Shake It Like You're 27, Take It Like You're 11
- Website: epc.buffalo.edu/authors/place/index.html

Vanessa Place (born May 10, 1968) is an American writer and criminal appellate attorney. She is the co-director of the Los Angeles-based Les Figues Press. Place has also worked as an occasional screenwriter on television shows such as Law & Order: Special Victims Unit and Xena: Warrior Princess with producer Liz Friedman.

== Education ==
Place earned a BA at the University of Massachusetts Amherst, an MFA at Antioch University, and a JD at Boston University.

== Conceptual and performance art ==
Place is associated with the Conceptual Art movement and has lectured and performed at events including at the Sorbonne in Paris, London's Whitechapel Gallery, and the Andre Bely Centre for Experimental Writing in St. Petersburg, and the Getty Villa in Los Angeles. In 2012, Place was the first poet to perform as part of the Whitney Biennial. In 2013, Place had her first solo art exhibition, The Lawyer is Present, a response to Marina Abramović's The Artist Is Present, at the Boulder Museum of Contemporary Art, in which she listened to confidential confessions from volunteers and then performed them for the public. In 2014, Place exhibited her work Last Words alongside Andrea Fraser’s Tehachapi at Kings Road at the MAK Center for Art and Architecture/Schindler House. Critic Sharon Mizota, writing for the Los Angeles Times, notes the two artists "filled the Schindler House, a landmark of 20th century modernism, with nothing but sound. Emptied of all but a few pieces of furniture, the house becomes both a setting and a listening device: an echo chamber reverberating with history and ideology."

Place has been reciting a set of rape jokes through her performance, If I Wanted Your Opinion, I’d Remove the Duct Tape, since 2016. The Nu Performance Festival in Tallinn and the Swiss Institute in New York have previously hosted the performance, and philosopher Mladen Dolar was the respondent for a performance in Ljubljana. In a 2017 interview with Artforum, Place states: "The structure of a joke, according to Freud, is that it is a sudden discharge of repression, often sexual, often kind of obscene. And so, in that way, the joke itself ends up being structured, or ends up having the same structure, as a rape — a violent discharge of repressed sexuality." A proposed sound installation of the work in 2015 was cancelled after a protest by other exhibition artists, leading to a panel on the project at Cabinet Magazine in Brooklyn, and a 2017 folio in Studies in Gender and Sexuality.

Place says she conceives of her soundworks as "liquid sculptures," wherein "sound behaves sculpturally." In the same Artforum interview, she emphasizes that her sound art depends upon the bodies of the audience receiving the work, as those bodies are also liquid sculptures.

Psychoanalytic and philosophic thinkers, such as Jacques Lacan and Immanuel Kant, often figure in Place's critical writing and performances. In her 2013 lecture "Conceptualism is Feminism," Place used Lacan's pronouncement "la femme n’existe pas" [there is no woman] to argue that "woman" as a category "only exists contextually — one can only be woman relative to man…" "Conceptualism," she says, "like feminism, asks one equally to consider the ‘=.’ How does A become equivalent to B, why does it seem (or seem to be proven to be) B’s equal, and at what cost does this equivalency work to A, and for that matter, B?" In "A Poetics of Radical Evil," an essay published in 2010, Place modifies Kant to argue: "There must be an art [...] that is willing to be affirmatively evil, not immoral exactly, but as a work of malfeasance, not for the polemic or didactic turn, showing that certain things are bad, stupid, etc, that’s easy enough, and sadly it seems one is expected to say these things, which is another form of obscenity, but for a more primal acceptance."

Critic Naomi Toth notes that Place "prefers hot items," subjects that generate unease and discomfort among audiences: "the legal defense of criminals, rape jokes, racist realist novels, the last words of death row convicts." Toth suggests Place takes up the discourse "of the suspect, the one we’ve designated as guilty, the one we’re going to execute, the one we consent to push off-scene: the person and the narratives many of us would prefer to suppress to shore up our identity, to found our own innocence." Toth states that Place's project can be understood as "one which makes this innocence suspect, for the duration of her performance at the very least. And for this choice, listeners hold her responsible in turn."

== Writing ==
Place has published over ten books of poetry, prose, and conceptual writing, including After Vanessa Place (2017) with Naomi Toth, Last Words (2015), Boycott (2013), ONE (2012, co-written with Blake Butler and Christopher Higgs), Factory Work (2011), Gone with the Wind (2011), Tragodía 3: Argument (2011), Tragodía 2: Statement of The Case (2011), Tragodía 1: Statement of Facts (2010), The Guilt Project: Rape, Morality and Law (2010), Notes on Conceptualisms (2009, co-written with Robert Fitterman), La Medusa (2008), and Dies: A Sentence (2005).

In 2005, Place co-founded Les Figues Press, which "publishes experimental writing and literature in translation with a focus on feminist and queer authors," in Los Angeles. Les Figues partnered with the Los Angeles Review of Books in 2017 as a member of its new imprint series, LARB Books. Place currently edits the press's Global Poetics Series.

== Career ==
Place is a criminal defense attorney who represents indigent sex offenders on appeal. She has previously published and performed works using courtroom materials. For example, her performance piece Last Words, reproduces the last statements of all inmates executed in Texas since 1982. Naomi Toth, writing about Last Words for Jacket2, states the work occurs "in a context in which, the listener realizes, speaking becomes the pronunciation of one’s own death sentence." Place's trilogy Tragodía (Statement of Facts, Statement of the Case, Argument) was a self-appropriation of sections of her appellate briefs on behalf of sex offenders as a contemporary response to Dante's Commedía.

In her 2010 book The Guilt Project: Rape, Morality, and Law (Other Press), Place reflects on an experience when a court clerk asked her, "How can you live with yourself?" during a "particularly gruesome" child rape case. "I said that I don’t," Place wrote. She goes on: "My job is not predicated on innocence. In our famously adversarial system of justice, we the actors play parts that are as important as the play. It’s a cliché that a society is judged by how it treats its most despicable members, a cliché that mindful people accept in the abstract and reject in practice. But freedom of speech is relevant only when the opinions are vile, and due process meaningful only when applied to the daddy who rapes his son."

== Recognition and reception ==
Place has held teaching appointments at the Université Paris Ouest Nanterre La Défense and the University of Colorado, Boulder. Various symposia on Place's work and "practice-based criticism" have been held, including at the Université Pairs Ouest Nanterre La Défense, Université de Paris Est Marne-la-Vallée, Université de Mulhouse Colmar Alsace, Université Paris XIII, Université Paris VIII, Royal Danish Writers’ Academy, Birkbeck College/University of London, and Sheffield Hallem University. Her translation from the French of Frank Smith's Guantanamo was a finalist for the 2015 PEN Literary Award, Poetry in Translation, and was named a book of the year in the Huffington Post.

== Criticism ==
Statement of Facts

Controversy around Place's Tragodía series began when literary critic Marjorie Perloff described the work as "a superb piece of conceptual writing," and presented a summation of the project at the 2010 Rethinking Poetics conference held at Columbia University. A number of American poets subsequently debated the merit of the work through a number of blogs and online forums in response to Perloff's statements. Critic Steven Zultanski writes that Place, when asked to "explain the intent of her work [...] of course, refused to do so, which has partially allowed for the book’s retention of its initial provocative appeal." Poet Juliana Spahr wrote: "Does Vanessa’s book mean to suggest that rape is largely a socio-economic problem?" In 2014, George Mason University Professor David Kaufmann wrote: "When Juliana Spahr asks about Place’s alliances and intentions — a question that the text raises by its very nature — there is no answer that Place could give that could close the gulf the book opens up before its audience. Not knowing what the author intends us to do with this stuff, we don’t know what to make of it. We are here. The victims, the perps, and the survivors — they are over there, in more ways than one."

Gone with the Wind

Place also received criticism for a Twitter art project where she retyped the entire text from the 1936 novel Gone with the Wind in an effort to call attention to the novel's inherent racism, as part of a larger project, Gone with the Wind by Vanessa Place, designed to implicate questions of copyright, the ownership of cultural fictions, the ongoing nature of the white imaginary, and the function of antagonism in social media. According to Place's own artist statement about the project: The book's true love story is not between Rhett and Scarlett but white America's affair with self, a self that can only exist through owning property as the primary means of white supremacy."

The Twitter art project included a stereotypical African American mammy image as its banner. A film still of Hattie McDaniel as the character Mammy from the film version of the book was used as the account's profile picture. While some have argued that the account was meant to scrutinize and call attention to stereotyping and racism in Gone With the Wind, others accused it of being racist or insensitive itself, which resulted in calls "for University of Colorado Boulder to remove her from her summer teaching appointment, . . . that she be dis-invited from [an] upcoming Berkeley Poetry Conference," as well as a petition for Place's removal from the 2016 Association of Writers & Writing Programs (AWP) conference subcommittee.

Subsequently, the Berkeley Poetry Conference was cancelled, AWP removed Place from the subcommittee to satisfy concerns from its membership, and the Whitney Museum of American Art cancelled a planned performance from Place.

In her response to criticism surrounding the project, Place said: "I see art that’s sanitized, art that’s precious, art that’s playing safe, art for the market. People say they want transgression, that they’re looking for the radical edge, but I’m not so sure. There’s a certain amount of cruelty in what I do. There has to be. You have to touch nerves, otherwise it’s just entertainment."

== Publications ==
- Dies: A Sentence (Les Figues, 2005)
- La Medusa (FC2, 2008)
- Notes on Conceptualisms (Ugly Duckling, 2009), with Robert Fitterman
- The Guilt Project: Rape, Morality and Law (Other, 2010)
- Tragodía 1: Statement of Facts (Blanc, 2010)
- Tragodía 2: Statement of The Case (Blanc, 2011)
- Tragodía 3: Argument (Blanc, 2011)
- Gone with the Wind (oodPress, 2011)
- Factory Work (Factory Works, 2011)
- ONE (Roof, 2012), with Blake Butler and Christopher Higgs
- Boycott (Ugly Duckling, 2013)
- Last Words (Dis Voir, 2015)
- After Vanessa Place (Ma Bibliothèque, 2017), with Naomi Toth
- You Had To Be There: Rape Jokes (powerHouse, 2018)

== Translations ==
- Guantanamo (Les Figues, 2014), by Frank Smith
