= Michael Snediker =

American poet

Michael D. Snediker is a poet and a scholar of American literature, poetics, and disability theory. He is a Professor of American Literature & Poetics at the University of Houston, before which he was a Queens National Scholar and Associate Professor of American Literature at Queen's University, in Kingston, Ontario.

His poetry has appeared in The Cortland Review, New World Writing (formerly Blip Magazine), Beloit Poetry Journal, Black Warrior Review, Court Green, swamp pink (formerly Crazyhorse), Jubilat, Margie, and Pleiades.

He has been nominated twice for the Pushcart Prize. His book of poems, The New York Editions (Fordham University Press, 2017), won the Poets Out Loud prize, and his earlier book of poems, The Apartment of Tragic Appliances (Punctum Books, 2014), was a Lambda Finalist for Best Gay Poetry.

He is the author of Contingent Figure: Chronic Pain and Queer Embodiment (University of Minnesota Press, 2021). His widely-reviewed book Queer Optimism: Lyric Personhood and Other Felicitous Persuasions (University of Minnesota Press, 2008) offers new readings of the poetry of Emily Dickinson, Hart Crane, Elizabeth Bishop, and Jack Spicer.

He received his Ph.D. in English from Johns Hopkins University and is the recipient of multiple residencies at Yaddo and the James Merrill House.

== Poetry ==
The New York Editions (Fordham University Press, 2017)

"The Apartment of Tragic Appliances" (Punctum, 2013)

Bourdon (White Rabbit Press, 2010).

Nervous Pastoral (Dove/tail Press, 2008).

== Selected chapters and articles ==
- "Weaver's Handshake: The Aesthetics of Chronic Objects," "Reading Eve Sedgwick," ed. Lauren Berlant (Duke University Press, 2019)
- “Is the Rectangle a Grave? Bersani, Rothko, and the Dream of Disability,” "Leo Bersani: Queer Theory and Beyond', ed. Mikko Tuhkanen (SUNY Press, 2015).
- “Pierre and the Non-Transparencies of Figuration,” ELH (2010).
- “Subjunctivity,” Postmodern Culture 18.3 (2008).
- “Queer Optimism,” Postmodern Culture 16.3 (2006).
- “Stasis & Verve: Henry James and the Fictions of Patience,” The Henry James Review 27.1 (2006).
