= Timothy Donnelly =

American poet (born 1969)

- Born: 1969 (age 56–57); Providence, Rhode Island, U.S.
- Education: Johns Hopkins University; Columbia University
- Occupations: Professor and poet
- Writing career
- Genre: Poetry

Timothy Donnelly (born 1969) is an American poet and professor. He is the author of several acclaimed poetry collections, including The Cloud Corporation, which won the Kingsley Tufts Poetry Award.

== Early life and education ==
Donnelly was born in Providence, Rhode Island. He earned his BA degree from Johns Hopkins University and his MFA in Poetry from Columbia University's MFA in Creative Writing program.

== Career ==
Donnelly published his first book of poems, Twenty-seven Props for a Production of Eine Lebenszeit, with Grove Press in 2003. His second collection, The Cloud Corporation, was published by Wave Books in 2010 and in the United Kingdom by Picador in 2011. It was a finalist for the William Carlos Williams Award and won the 2012 Kingsley Tufts Poetry Award.

Donnelly's third collection, The Problem of the Many, was published in 2019, and his fourth, Chariot, was released by Wave Books in 2023.

His poems have been translated into several languages, including German, Italian, Spanish, and Albanian. A full-length German edition of his work was published by Luxbooks in 2008.

Donnelly served as the poetry editor of the Boston Review from 1996 to 2018. He is currently a professor in the Writing Program at Columbia University’s School of the Arts

== Awards and honors ==
Some of the notable awards and recognition Donnelly has received:

- James Merrill House, Writer in Residence (2024).
- Lannan Foundation Residency at Marfa (2016).
- Alice Fay di Castagnola Award from the Poetry Society of America (2014).
- Kingsley Tufts Poetry Award (2012) for The Cloud Corporation.
- Guggenheim Fellowship (2012).
- Bernard F. Conners Prize for Poetry from The Paris Review (2002).

== Bibliography ==
=== Poetry ===
Collections

- Twenty-seven Props for a Production of Eine Lebenszeit. New York: Grove Press, 2003.
- The Cloud Corporation. Seattle: Wave Books, 2010.
- The Problem of the Many. Seattle: Wave Books, 2019.
- Chariot. Seattle: Wave Books, 2023.

Chapbooks

- "The Cloud Corporation" (Hand Held Editions, 2008)
- Three Poets (Minus A Press, 2012) coauthored with John Ashbery and Geoffrey G. O'Brien
- "Hymn to Life" (Factory Hollow Press, 2014)

Anthologized

- Please Excuse This Poem: 100 New Poets for the Next Generation (Penguin, 2015) edited by Brett Fletcher Lauer and Lynn Melnick
- Poems, Poets, Poetry: An Introduction and Anthology (Bedford/St. Martin's, 2009) edited by Helen Vendler
- Joyful Noise: An Anthology of American Spiritual Poetry (Autumn House, 2006) edited by Robert Strong
- Legitimate Dangers: American Poets of the New Century (Sarabande Books, 2006) edited by Michael Dumanis and Cate Marvin
- Isn't It Romantic: 100 Love Poems by Younger American Poets (Verse Books, 2004), edited by Brett Fletcher Lauer and Aimee Kelley
