= Charles Harper Webb =

American poet

- Born: Philadelphia, Pennsylvania, U.S.
- Occupation: Poet

Academic background
- Education: University of Southern California; University of Washington; Rice University

Academic work
- Sub-discipline: California State University, Long Beach

Charles Harper Webb is an American poet, professor, psychotherapist and former singer and guitarist. His most recent poetry collection is Shadow Ball (University of Pittsburgh Press, 2009). His honors include a Whiting Award, a Guggenheim Fellowship, The Kate Tufts Discovery Award, a Pushcart Prize and inclusion in The Best American Poetry 2006. His poems have appeared in literary journals and magazines including American Poetry Review, Paris Review, and Ploughshares. Webb was born in Philadelphia in 1952, and grew up in Houston. He earned his B.A. in English from Rice University, and an M.A. in English from the University of Washington, and an M.F.A. in Professional Writing and his PhD in Counseling Psychology from the University of Southern California. He teaches at California State University, Long Beach, where he received a Distinguished Faculty Scholarly and Creative Achievement Award and the Distinguished Faculty Teaching Award, and he lives in Long Beach, California.

== Honors and awards ==
- 2001 Guggenheim Fellowship
- 1999 Felix Pollack Prize, for Liver
- 1998 Whiting Award
- 1998 Kate Tufts Discovery Award, for Reading the Water
- 1997 Morse Poetry Prize, for Reading the Water
- Academy of American Poets Prize

== Published works ==
Full-Length Poetry Collections

- Brain Camp. University of Pittsburgh Press. 2015. ISBN 978-0-82296-338-7.
- What Things Are Made Of. University of Pittsburgh Press. 2013. ISBN 978-0-82296-229-8.
- Shadow Ball. University of Pittsburgh Press. 2009. ISBN 978-0-82296-042-3.
- Amplified Dog. Red Hen Press. 2006. ISBN 978-1-59709-022-3.
- Hot Popsicles. University of Wisconsin Press. 2005. ISBN 978-0-299-20994-0.
- Tulip farms and leper colonies: poems. BOA Editions, Ltd. 2001. ISBN 978-1-929918-15-7.
- Liver. University of Wisconsin Press. September 14, 1999. ISBN 978-0-299-16574-1.
- Reading the Water. Northeastern University Press. 1997. ISBN 978-1-55553-325-0.
- A Webb for All Seasons. Applezaba Press. 1992. ISBN 978-0-930090-58-6.
- Poetry That Heals (Red Wind Books, 1991)
- Everyday Outrages (Red Wind Books, 1989)
- Zinjanthropus Disease (Querencia Press, 1978)

Anthologies Edited

- Stand-Up Poetry: An Expanded Anthology (University of Iowa Press, 2002)
- Stand-Up Poetry: The Anthology (California State University Press, 1994)
- Stand-Up Poetry: The Poetry of Los Angeles and Beyond (Red Wind Books, 1990)
