= Doug Anderson (poet) =

American writer

- Born: 1943 (age 82–83)
- Writing career
- Genres: Poetry, Nonfiction
- Notable work: The Moon Reflected Fire

Doug Anderson (born 1943) is an American poet, fiction writer, and memoirist. His most recent book is Horse Medicine (Barrow Street Books). He has written a memoir, Keep Your Head Down: Vietnam, the Sixties, and a Journey of Self-Discovery (W.W. Norton, 2009). His honors include grants and fellowships from the National Endowment for the Arts, the Massachusetts Artists Foundation, the Massachusetts Cultural Council, Poets & Writers, and the MacDowell Colony. His work has appeared in Ploughshares, the Connecticut Review, The Massachusetts Review, Virginia Quarterly, The Southern Review, Field, and The Autumn House Anthology of American Poetry, as well as this year's Contemporary American War Poetry. He also published a play, Short Timers, which was produced in New York in 1981.

He served in Vietnam as a corpsman with a Marine infantry battalion in 1967. He graduated from the University of Arizona. He worked in the theater, as an actor. He then settled in Northampton, Massachusetts, where he began to write plays and poems in a workshop with Jack Gilbert, and Linda Gregg. Anderson taught at the University of Connecticut, Eastern Connecticut State University, the William Joiner Center for the Study of War and Its Social Consequences, Mount Wachusett Community College and at a Massachusetts state prison. He is completing a book called Loose Cantos. In 2010, he began teaching in the Pacific University of Oregon MFA Program. He is currently a lecturer in the Institute of Liberal Arts and Interdisciplinary Studies at Emerson College, Boston.

== Honors and awards ==
- Pushcart Prize
- NEA grant
- Massachusetts Cultural Council Fellowship
- 1995 Kate Tufts Discovery Award for The Moon Reflected Fire

== Published works ==
Full-length poetry collections

- Bamboo Bridge: Poems. Amherst Writers & Artists Press. 1991. ISBN 978-0-941895-07-1.
- The Moon Reflected Fire. Alice James Books. 1994. ISBN 978-1-882295-03-6.
- Blues for Unemployed Secret Police. Curbstone Press. 2000. ISBN 978-1-880684-70-2.

Chapbooks

- Cry Wolf (Azul Editions)

Anthology publications

- Lorrie Goldensohn, ed. (2006). "Infantry Assault". American war poetry. Columbia University Press. ISBN 978-0-231-13310-4.
- Andersen, Jon (2008). Seeds of Fire : Contemporary Poetry from the Other USA. Middlesbrough: Smokestack. ISBN 978-0-9554028-2-1. OCLC 180473824.
- Melissa Tuckey, ed. (2018). Ghost Fishing: An Eco-Justice Poetry Anthology. University of Georgia Press. ISBN 978-0820353159.

Memoir

- Keep Your Head Down: Vietnam, The Sixties, and a Journey of Self-Discovery

== Reviews ==
Joyce Peseroff writes that The Moon Reflected Fire is “not just about Vietnam but resonant with the history of warriors from the backyard to the Iliad to the Bible.

Blues for Unemployed Secret Police, was praised by Booklist for its “powerful, funny-horrific, brutal-tender poems.”
