= Les Figues Press =

American non-profit literary press

- Founded: 2005
- Founder: Teresa Carmody, Vanessa Place
- Country of origin: United States
- Headquarters location: Los Angeles, California
- Publication types: Books
- Fiction genres: literary fiction and poetry
- Official website: www.lesfigues.com

Les Figues Press is an American non-profit literary press that publishes poetry, prose, visual art, conceptual writing, and translation. Based in Los Angeles, California, the press curates and hosts literary events, readings, performances, and art salons. Les Figues upholds a feminist criticality and editorial vision. Their stated mission is to create aesthetic conversations between readers, writers, and artists by publishing innovative/experimental and avant-garde styled work.

== History ==
Les Figues Press was founded in January 2005 by Teresa Carmody, Vanessa Place, Pam Ore and Sarah La Borde. In December 2005, the press became incorporated as a nonprofit 501c3 organization.

From 2005 to 2013, the press published the TrenchArt Series. The TrenchArt series was an annual series of four books with a collection of essays. The series was devoted to facilitating conversations about the craft and form of writing. In 2008, Alta Ifland's collection Voix de Glace/Voice of Ice won the Louis Guillaume Prize for Prose Poems, France and in 2012, Jen Hofer's translation of Myriam Moscona's Negro Marfil/Ivory Black won the Harold Morton Landon Translation Award (selected by Pierre Joris), and the PEN Award for Poetry in Translation (selected by Christian Hawkey).

Between 2010 and 2011, the press curated NOT CONTENT, a series of text installations at Los Angeles Contemporary Exhibitions (LACE). The writers involved included: Divya Victor, Vanessa Place, Douglas Kearney, Amina Cain, Mathew Timmons, Teresa Carmody, Christine Wertheim, Marco Antonio Huerta, and Sawako Nakayasu.

In 2011, the press launched the NOS (not otherwise specified) Book Contest. The NOS contest seeks submissions of poetry, lyrical essays, novellas, and other forms not otherwise specified. Winners receive $1,000 and publication by the press. Past winners include: Becca Jensen for Among the Dead: Ah! And Afterward Yes! in 2011 (Selected by Sarah Shun-lien Bynum), Jessica Bozek for The Tales in 2012, (Selected by Sina Queyras), and Colin Winnette for Coyote in 2013 (Selected by Aimee Bender).

From 2012 to 2013, the press held the first two parts of a three part series named Q.E.D (Quod Erat Demonstrandum) at Schindler House. In the series, a writer, an artist, and a critic meet to discuss contemporary issues and conditions of queer art and literature. The questions are drawn from the participants' creative work and philosophies.

In 2014, the press launched the Global Poetics Series, an annual series dedicated to exploring new forms and theories of innovative poetry and prose around the world. The books in the series include: Frank Smith's Guantanamo, Sawako Nakayasu's The Ants, and Derek Beaulieu's Kern.
