= James Merrill House =

Historic house in Connecticut, United States

- U.S. National Register of Historic Places
- U.S. National Historic Landmark
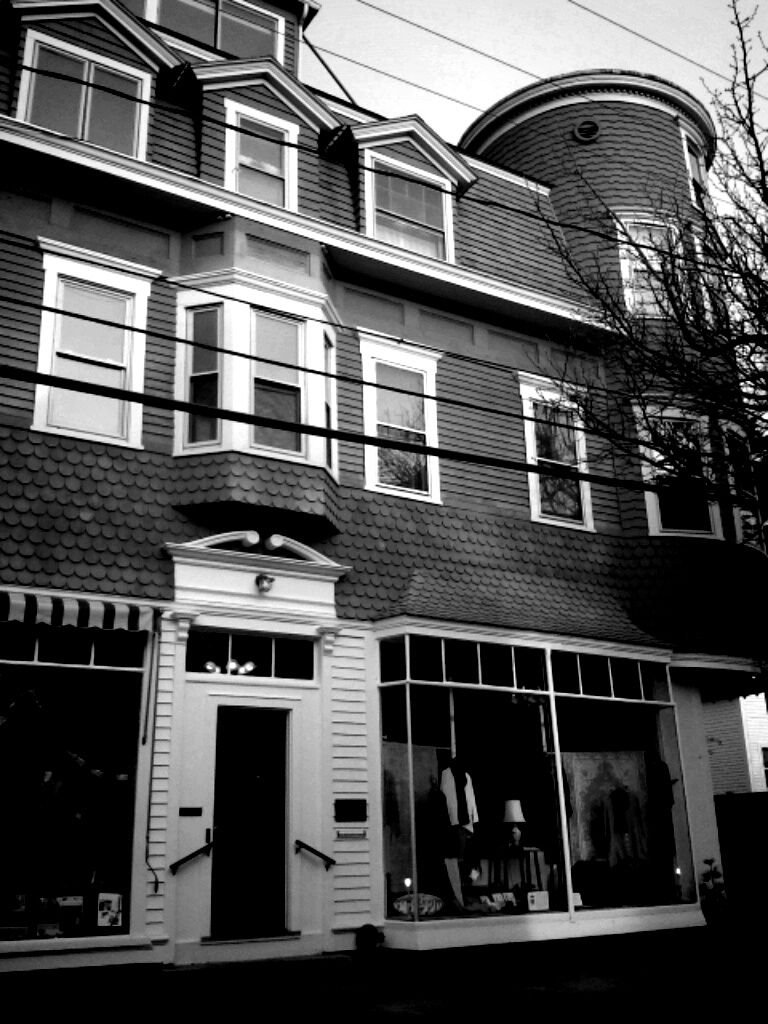
- James Merrill House exterior
- Location: Stonington, CT
- Coordinates: 41°20′1.32″N 71°54′23.88″W
- Built: 1901
- Architectural style: Victorian Eclectic
- NRHP reference No.: 13000618

Significant dates
- Added to NRHP: August 28, 2013
- Designated NHL: October 31, 2016

The James Merrill House is a 19th-century late-Victorian style house at 107 Water Street in Stonington Borough in southeastern Connecticut, formerly owned by poet James Merrill. Upon his death in 1995, the house was kept by the village as a home for writers and scholars.

== History ==
If I am host at last
It is of little more than my own past.
May others be at home in it.

— James Merrill, Water Street

The American poet James Merrill and his partner David Jackson moved to the borough of Stonington, Connecticut, in 1954, purchasing a property at 107 Water Street. It had once been a nineteenth-century residential and commercial structure that had first served as a drug store and a residence for the owner's family. Merrill spent summers in Stonington borough until his death in 1995. Village life and the apartment itself inspired some of his most important work, including The Changing Light at Sandover, his book-length epic poem based on Merrill's and Jackson's communications with the spirit world by means of a Ouija board in the turret dining room on the third floor.

After James Merrill's death in 1995, the Stonington Village Improvement Association (SVIA) transformed the Jackson and Merrill apartments into a place for writers to live and work. A group of Stonington residents and friends of Merrill began a program that would make the apartment available, rent-free, to writers and scholars for academic-year residencies. The Merrill apartment still looks much the way Merrill left it at his death – the personally eclectic décor remains as it was three decades ago, and Merrill's books, art, and objects have been professionally conserved. In the years since Merrill's death, over a hundred writers have used this space as a residence and retreat.

Under the year-round James Merrill House Writer-in-Residence program, the house is normally occupied year-round by one writer at a time, for stays of about one month each. Each writer typically gives a public live or live-streamed presentation of new work while in residence.

The house was added to the National Register of Historic Places on August 28, 2013 and designated a National Historic Landmark on October 31, 2016.

== James Merrill House Writers in Residence ==
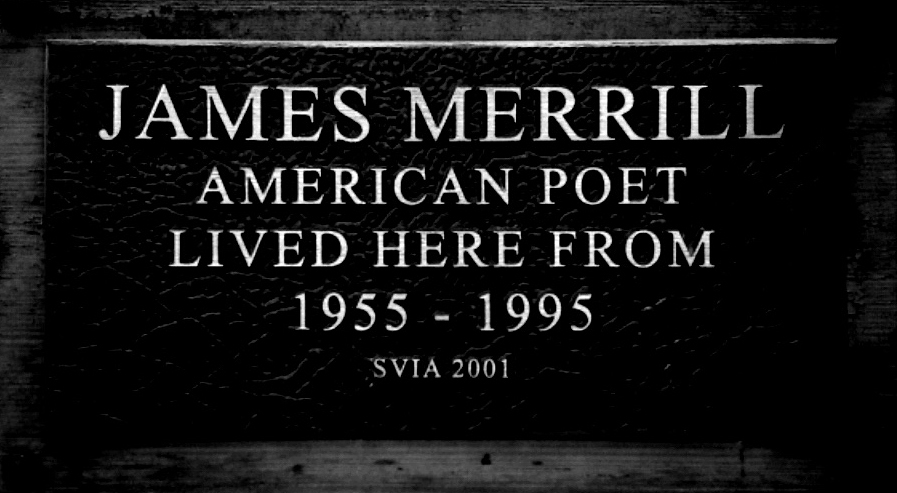
Historical marker outside James Merrill House

Katie Peterson (September 2025)
David Yezzi (August 2025)
Suji Kwock Kim (July 2025)
João Tordo (June 2025)
Manan Kapoor (April 2025)
Ersi Sotiropoulos (November 2024)
Timothy Donnelly (October 2024)
Will Dowd (September 2024-25, virtual residency)
Tochukwu Okafor (August 2024)
Cindy Juyoung Ok (June 2024, YYP)
Judith Dupré (April 2024)
Lisa Ko (February 2024)
Adrienne Raphel (December 2023)
Paul Maddern (November 2023)
Angie Estes (October 2023)
Maureen McLane (August 2023)
John Liles (June 2023, YYP 2024)
Rob Schlegel (April 2023)
Pemi Aguda (February 2023)
Lauren Sandler (January 2023)
Eduardo Corral (invited September 2022)
Christopher Spaide (November 2022)
Laura Kolbe (October 2022)
Robert Wood Lynn (June 2022, YYP 2021)
Mehdi Tavana Okasi (April 2022)
Kamran Javadizadeh (February 2022)
John Cotter (January 2022)
Michael Collier (November 2021)
Marlon James (October 2021)
Henri Cole (September 2021)
Armen Davoudian (July 2021)
Desiree C. Bailey (June 2021, YYP 2020)
Greg Wrenn (April 2021)
Kirstin Valdez Quade (February 2021)
Nicholas Boggs (December 2020)
Jennifer Grotz (November 2020)
Ryan Chapman (October 2020)
Walt Hunter (September 2020)
Talvikki Ansel (August 2020, YYP 1996)
Claire Luchette (July 2020)
Jill Osier (invited June 2020, YYP 2019)
Keith Wilson (March-May 2020)
Lysley Tenario (February 2020)
Matthew Minicucci (December 2019)
Gabriella Gage (August 2019)
Yanyi (June 2019, YYP 2018)
James Longenbach (Spring 2019)
Joanna Scott (Spring 2019)
Sigrid Nunez (December 2018)
Jordan Jacks (November 2018)
Christa Romanosky (September 2018)
Duy Doan (June 2018, YYP 2017)
Suzanne Rivecca (Spring 2018)
Mike Alberti (December 2017)
Maxim Loskutoff (November 2017)
D.M. (Damilola) Aderibigbe (October 2017)
Dan Chiasson (September 2017)
Walter Perrie (August 2017)
Airea Dee Matthews (June 2017, YYP 2016)
Mark Wunderlich (Spring 2017)
Caoilinn Hughes (December 2016)
Jennifer Clarvoe (November 2016)
Catherine Pond (October 2016)
Nate Klug (September 2016)
Lorrie Moore (Invited Summer Fellow, July 2016)
Noah Warren (June 2016, YYP 2015)
Adam Giannelli (Spring 2016)
Geri Doran (December 2015)
Terese Svoboda (November 2015)
Julia Glass (October 2015)
Susan Steinberg (September 2015)
Kay Ryan (Invited Summer Fellow, July 2015)
Ansel Elkins (June 2015, YYP 2014)
Moira Egan (Spring 2015)
Damiano Abeni (Spring 2015)
Kathleen Winter (December 2014)
Adam Wilson (November 2014)
Anna Noyes (November 2014)
Ahimsa Timoteo Bodhran (October 2014)
Molly Anders (September 2014)
Eryn Green(June 2014, YYP 2013)
Peter Kline (January 2014)
Brittany Perham (December 2013)
Mieke Eerkens (November 2013)
Amy Beeder (October 2013)
Caitlin Doyle (September 2013)
Dan O'Brien (June 2013)
James Reidel (2013 Spring)
Sally Ball (December 2012)
Gimbiya Kettering (November 2012)
Amy Greacen (October 2012)
Lydia Conklin (September 2012)
Peter Filkins (2012 Spring)
Will Schutt (2011 Fall)
Jedediah Berry (2011 Spring)
Josh Weil (2010 Fall)
Bruce Snider (2010 Spring)
Cate Marvin (2009 Fall)
Ivy Pochoda (2009 Spring)
Piotr Gwiazda (2008 Fall)
Langdon Hammer (2008 Spring)
Nancy Reisman (2007 Fall)
Rick Hilles (2007 Fall)
Anna Potter / Jacob Gamage (2007 Spring)
Michael Snediker (2006 Fall)
Jason Zuzga (2005–2006)
J.S. Marcus (2004–2005)
Michael Tyrell (2003-2004)
Matthew Zapruder (2003 Spring)
Paul Merrill (2002 Fall)
Sarah Gorham (2002 Spring)
Jeffrey Skinner (2002 Spring)
Molly McQuade (2001 Fall)
Brigit Pegeen Kelly (2000–2001)
Michael Madonick (2000–2001)
Aidan Wasley (1999–2000)
Ted Deppe (1998–1999)
Annie Deppe (1998–1999)
Daniel Hall (1997–1998)
Scott Westrem (1996–1997)
Peter Hawkins (1995–1996)

== Gallery ==
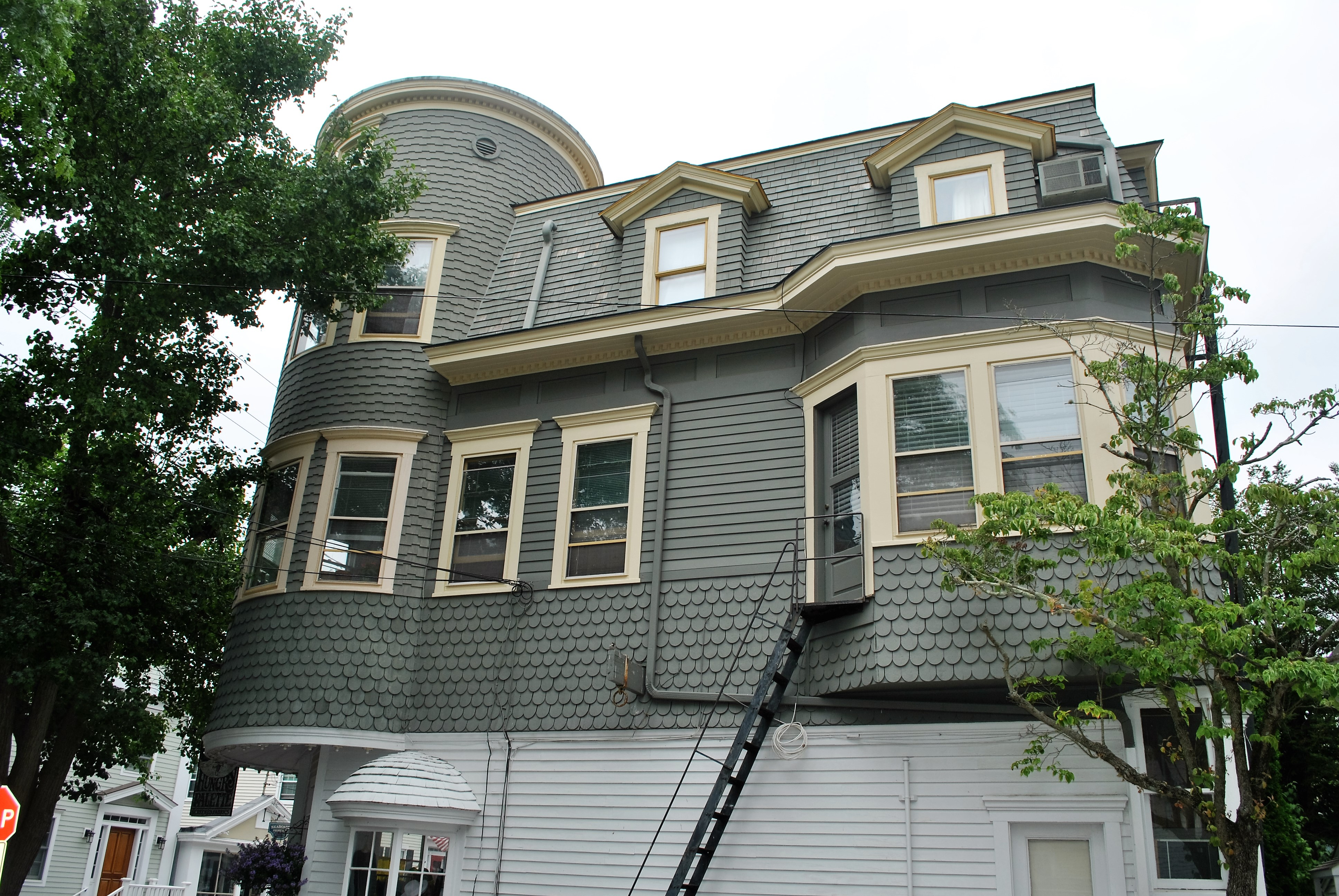

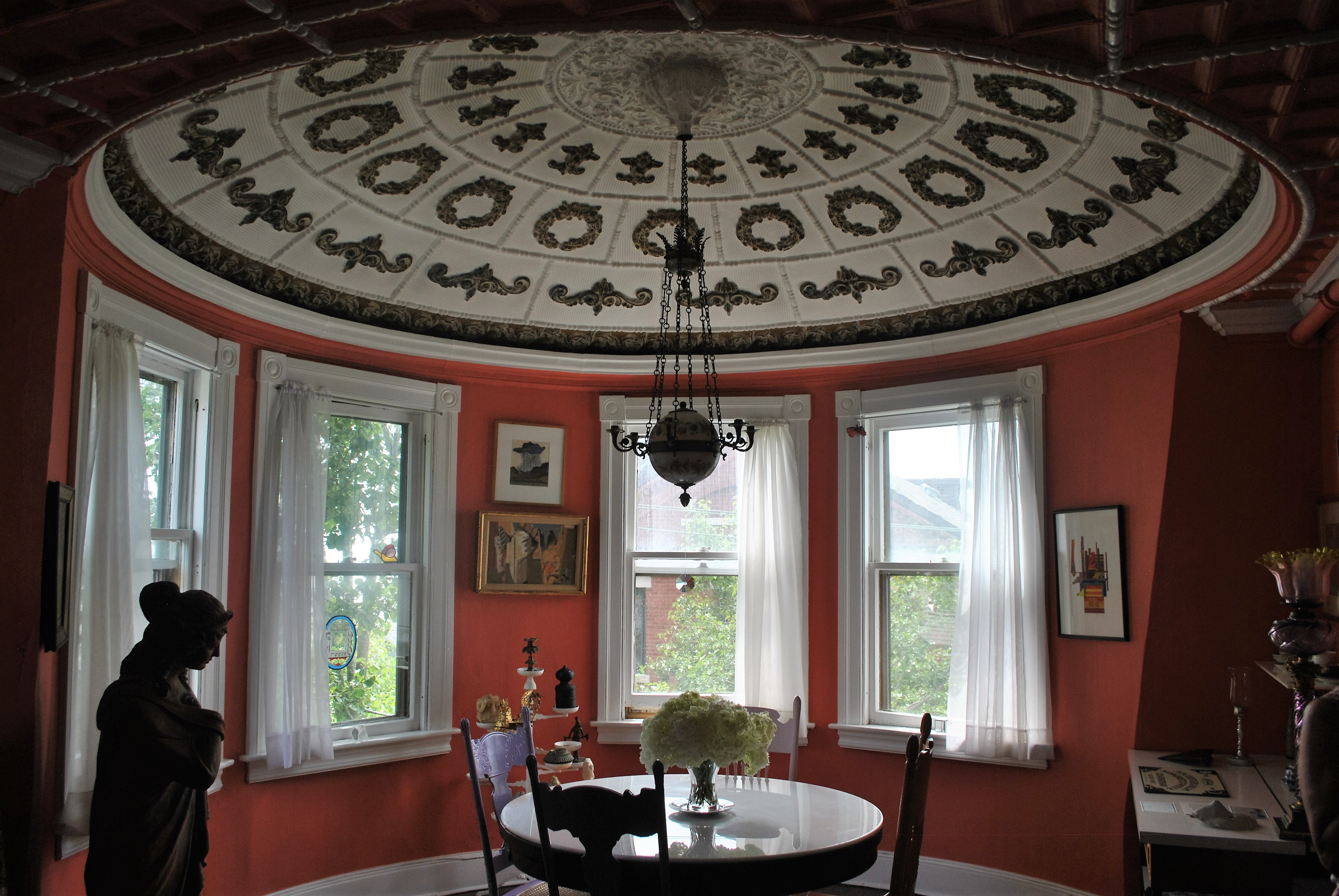

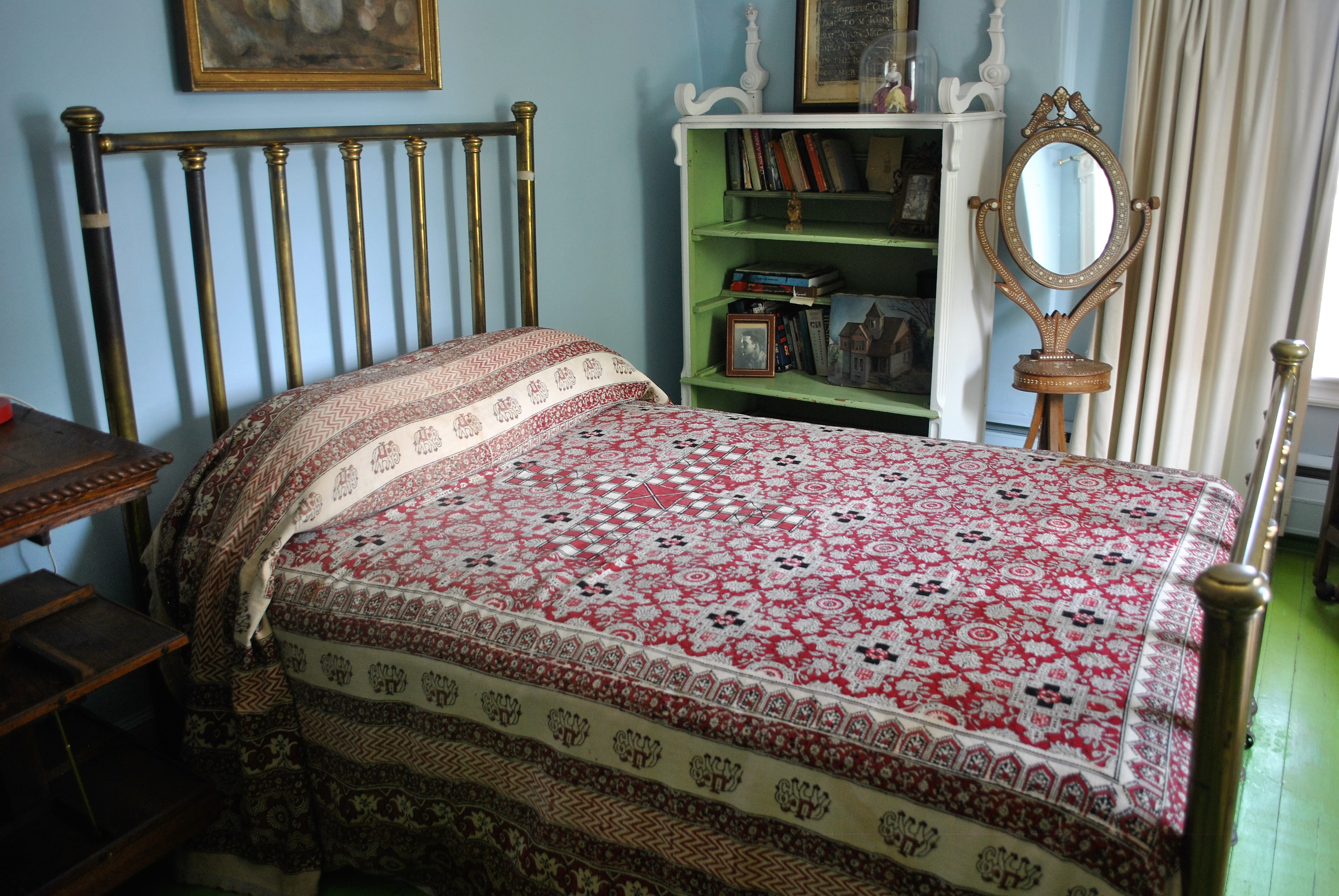

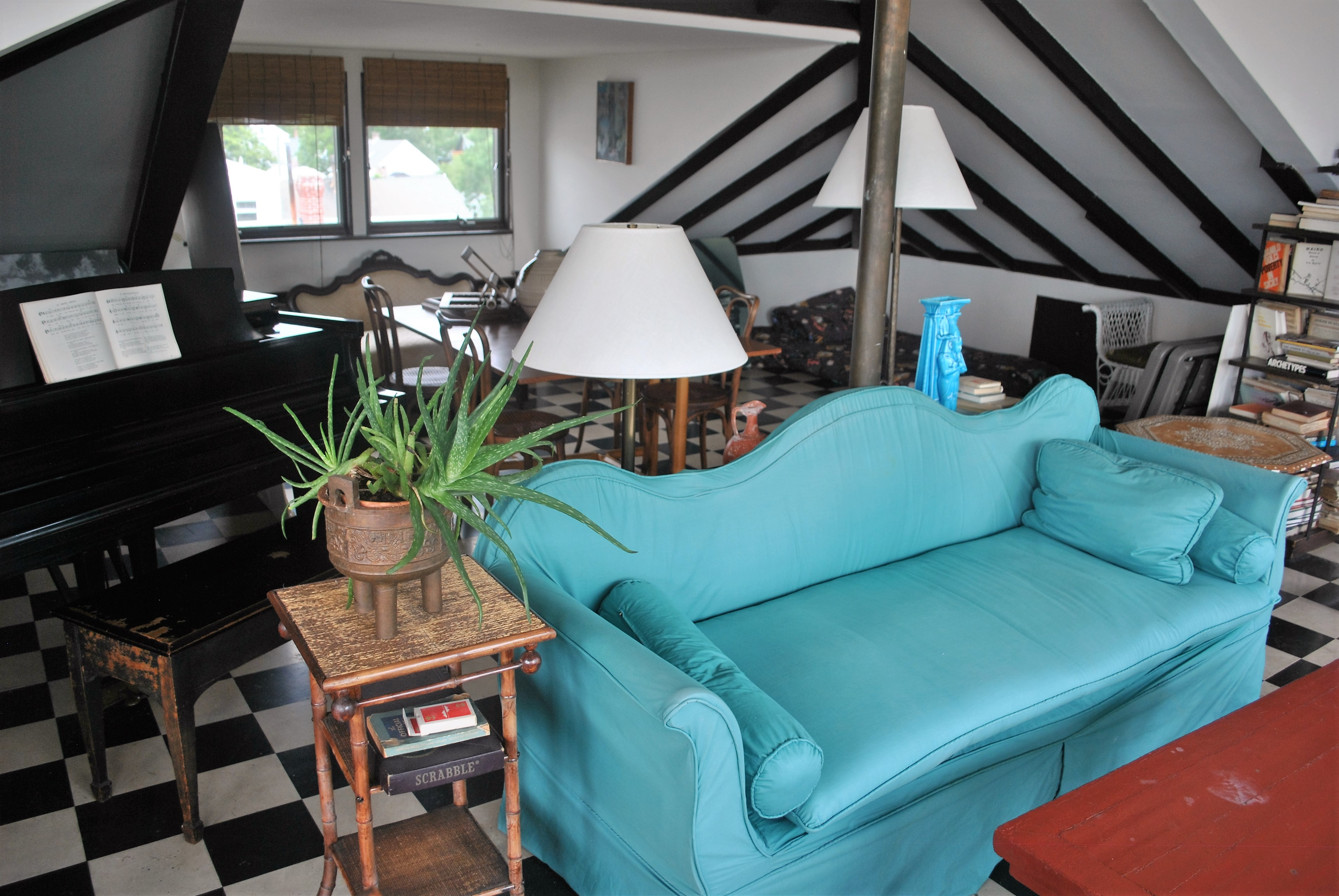

== See also ==
- National Register of Historic Places listings in New London County, Connecticut
- List of National Historic Landmarks in Connecticut
