= Insert Boy =

2014 poetry collection by Danez Smith

[insert] boy
- Author: Danez Smith
- Publisher: YesYes Books
- Publication date: December 24, 2014
- Pages: 128
- Awards: Lambda Literary Award for Gay Poetry; Kate Tufts Discovery Award; John C. Zacharis First Book Award
- ISBN: 978-1936919284
- Followed by: Don't Call Us Dead

[insert] boy is a 2014 debut poetry collection by Danez Smith, published by YesYes Books. The book won the Lambda Literary Award for Gay Poetry and the Kate Tufts Discovery Award.

== Contents ==
Smith's first poetry collection, the book's poems address body politics and the various levels of violence suffered by the poems' speakers ranging from societal to personal. It also addresses Smith's many intersecting identities as an LGBTQ black man.

== Critical reception ==
The book won the John C. Zacharis First Book Award from Ploughshares. The book was also a finalist for the Norma Farber First Book Award. Boston Globe mentioned the book in a list of the best poetry books of 2014.

Lambda Literary lauded Smith's affirmation of black identity and his reflections on painful, violence experiences in his own life. The reviewer also noticed the trajectory of healing and optimism which Smith's poems embark on: "Smith shifts from associating his body with harm, to learning how to warmly embrace other men ... In [insert] boy, Danez Smith calls for a world in which black boys and men are loved. A world where they are told they are beautiful and believe it."

The Rumpus appreciated Smith's adherence to the black literary tradition and his subsequent subversion of poetry as a predominantly white space and canon of work. Ultimately, the reviewer concluded "It’s a special book that cuts through the white noise of American culture."

Pank observed Smith's construction of the personal and political as a simultaneous act: "In [insert] boy, Smith ignites a discussion about life as a queer person of color in today’s racially charged, orientation conscious society. Through the arteries of movement, music, and religious (or non-religious) experience, Smith allows us to imagine life from his perspective in a way that only the most powerfully evocative poetry can."
