= Laura Sims =

American novelist and poet

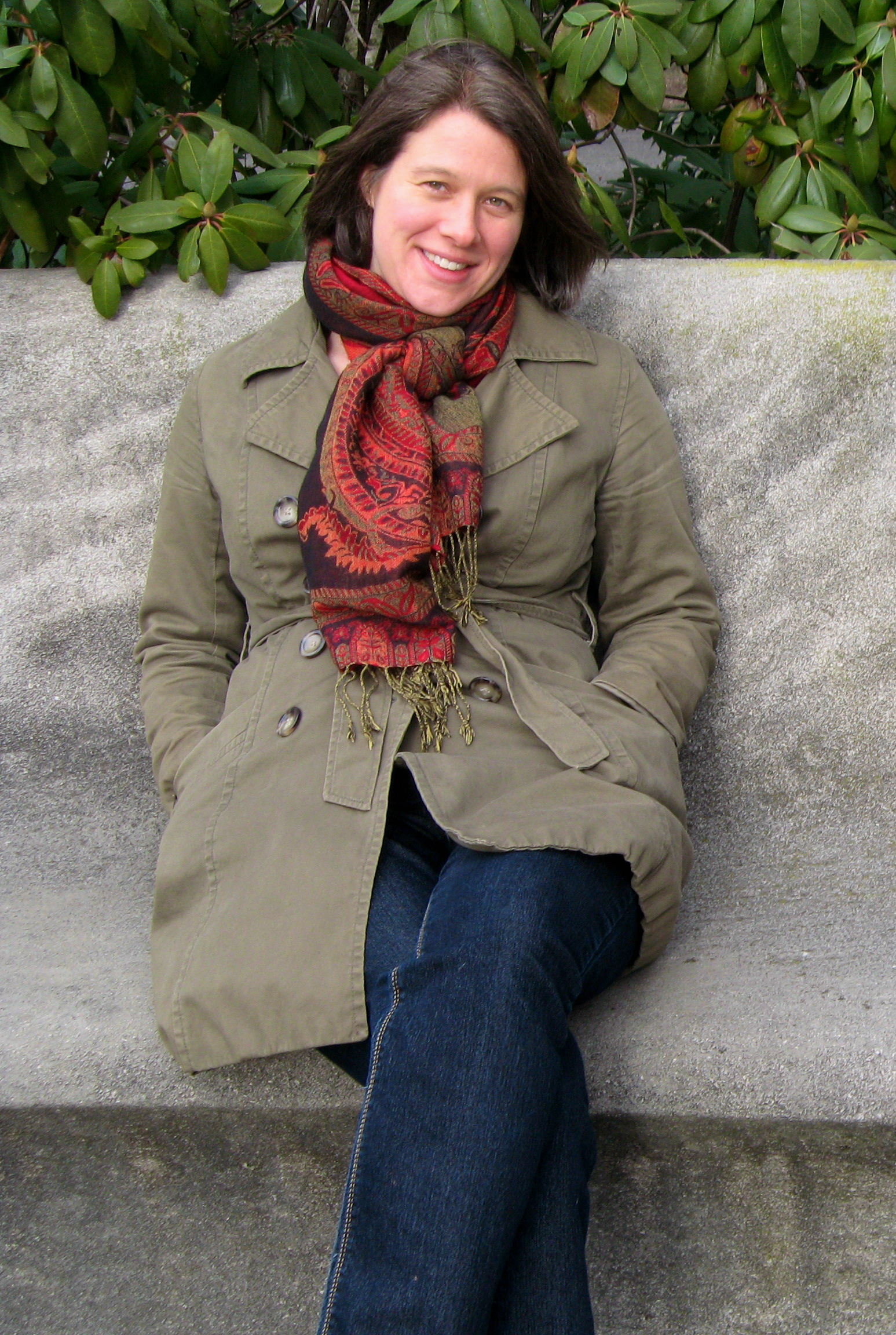
- Laura Sims
- Born: Richmond, Virginia
- Education: College of William & Mary; University of Washington (MFA)
- Occupation: Poet
- Writing career
- Notable works: Practice, Restraint and My god is this a man

Laura Sims is an American novelist and poet. In 2017, Sims' debut novel Looker sparked a bidding war, which ultimately resulted in a major deal with Scribner. The book follows the spiraling descent of a woman obsessed—with the end of her marriage, with her inability to have a child, with her infuriatingly bourgeois Brooklyn neighborhood, and with her movie star neighbor. It was released on January 8, 2019.

Sims's second novel, How Can I Help You, came out in July 2023. The novel received a major sales boost when bestselling crime novelist Harlan Coben recommended it as one of his favorite reads on the Today Show. Her latest novel is The Man.

== Biography ==
Sims is the author of four books of poetry: Staying Alive (Ugly Duckling Presse, 2016), My god is this a man, Stranger, and Practice, Restraint (Fence Books). In 2014, powerHouse Books published Fare Forward: Letters from David Markson, compiled and edited by Sims. She has published five poetry chapbooks, including POST- (Goodmorning Menagerie, 2011). Her poetry has appeared in numerous literary journals, including Aufgabe, Black Clock, Black Warrior Review, Colorado Review, Columbia Poetry Review, Crayon, and Denver Quarterly, among others. She has published book reviews and essays in Boston Review, New England Review, Rain Taxi, and The Review of Contemporary Fiction. Her honors include the 2005 Fence Books Alberta Prize for Practice, Restraint and a Creative Artists Exchange Fellowship from the Japan-US Friendship Commission in 2006.

Sims is a graduate of the College of William and Mary. She received a Master of Fine Arts degree from the University of Washington. She is a professor of creative writing, literature and composition who currently teaches at New York University. She has been a featured writer for Harriet, the Poetry Foundation's blog, and she is a co-editor of Instance Press with poets Elizabeth Robinson, Beth Anderson, and Susanne Dyckman. She lives in South Orange, New Jersey.

== Published works ==
=== Novels ===
- Looker (Scribner, 8 January 2019)
- How Can I Help You (Penguin Random House, 18 July 2023)

=== Poetry books ===
- Staying Alive (Ugly Duckling Presse, 2016)
- My god is this a man (Fence Books, 2014)
- Stranger (Fence Books, 2009)
- Practice, Restraint (Fence Books, 2005)

=== Nonfiction books ===
- Fare Forward: Letters from David Markson (powerHouse Books, 2014)

=== Chapbooks ===
- POST- (Goodmorning Menagerie Press, 2012)
- Bank Book (Answer Tag Press, 2004)

=== Recent poems ===
- Excerpt from Staying Alive on Omniverse blog
- Excerpt from Staying Alive in Gulf Coast
- Excerpt from Staying Alive in Black Clock
