= Linda Gregerson =

American poet, teacher

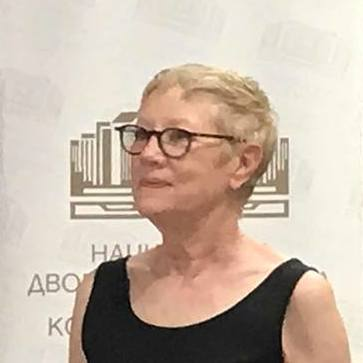
Linda Gregerson on the presentation of her book "Breathing machines" at the "Peroto" club, National Palace of Culture, Sofia, 2018

Linda Gregerson (born August 5, 1950) is an American poet and member of faculty at the University of Michigan. In 2014, she was named as a Chancellor of the Academy of American Poets.

== Life ==
Linda Gregerson received a B.A. from Oberlin College in 1971, an M.A. from Northwestern University, an M.F.A. from the University of Iowa Writers Workshop, and her Ph.D. from Stanford University. She teaches American poetry and Renaissance literature at the University of Michigan, where she has also directed the M.F.A. program in creative writing. She took up an appointment as the Lois and Willard Mackey Chair in Creative Writing at Beloit College in the academic year 2009–2010.

She served as the judge for the 2008 Brittingham Prize in Poetry. Her poems are featured in American Alphabets: 25 Contemporary Poets (2006) and many other anthologies.

== Awards ==
- Kingsley Tufts Poetry Award for Waterborne
- The Poet's Prize finalist
- Lenore Marshall Poetry Prize finalist for The Woman Who Died in Her Sleep
- Levinson Prize from Poetry magazine
- Consuelo Ford Award from the Poetry Society of America
- Isabel MacCaffrey Award from the Spenser Society of America
- 2000 Guggenheim Fellowship
- Pushcart Prize.

== Selected works ==
=== Poetry ===
Collections

- Fire in the Conservatory (1982)
- The Woman Who Died in Her Sleep (1996)
- Waterborne (Houghton Mifflin, 2002)
- Magnetic North (Houghton Mifflin, 2007)
- The Selvage (Houghton Mifflin, 2012) ISBN 9780547750095
- Prodigal: New and Selected Poems, 1976 to 2014, (Houghton Mifflin, 2015) ISBN 9780544301672
- Canopy, Ecco, New York, 2022. ISBN 9780358671053

List of poems

Title	Year	First published	Reprinted/collected
Ceres lamenting	2014	"Ceres lamenting". The New Yorker. 90 (22): 40–41. August 4, 2014.	
The death of Ananias	2009	"The death of Ananias". The Poetry Review. Winter 2009.	

=== Non-fiction ===
- The Reformation of the Subject: Spenser, Milton, and the English Protestant Epic (1995)
- Negative Capability: Contemporary American Poetry (2001)
