= Sandy Solomon =

American poet

- Born: Baltimore, Maryland, U.S.
- Education: University of Chicago; Johns Hopkins University (MA); Warren Wilson College (MFA)
- Occupation: Poet
- Writing career
- Notable awards: Agnes Lynch Starrett Poetry Prize (1995)
- Website: www.sandysolomon.com

Sandy Solomon (born Baltimore, Maryland) is an American poet.

== Life ==
Solomon was raised in Baltimore, Maryland. She graduated from the University of Chicago.

She worked in Washington, DC for the National Urban Coalition and then directed two groups: the National Neighborhood Coalition and the Coalition on Human Needs. She received an MA from Johns Hopkins University and an MFA from the Program for Writers at Warren Wilson College. She teaches at Vanderbilt University.

Her work has appeared in The New Yorker, The New Republic, The Threepenny Review, The Gettysburg Review, The Times Literary Supplement, Ploughshares, and Partisan Review.

Her book, Pears, Lake, Sun, was published by the University of Pittsburgh Press in 1996. She held fellowships from the Radcliffe's Bunting Institute, now the Radcliffe Institute for Advanced Study at Harvard, in 1997-8 and 1998-9.

She participated in Poets Against the War.

== Awards ==
- 1995 Agnes Lynch Starrett Poetry Prize

== Works ==
Individual poems include:

- Sandy Solomon (Spring 2009). "Diary of Mary Dodge Woodward". Prairie Schooner. 83 (1): 131. doi:10.1353/psg.0.0196. S2CID 73229829.
- "The Game is Over". The Monthly Review. April 2003.
- "After Qu Yuan". Virginia Quarterly Review. Autumn 1988.
- "Praying Mantis". Virginia Quarterly Review. Autumn 1988. Archived from the original on 2008-08-28.

Book:

- Pears, Lake, Sun. University of Pittsburgh Press. 1996. ISBN 978-0-8229-3961-0.
