= Danez Smith =

American poet

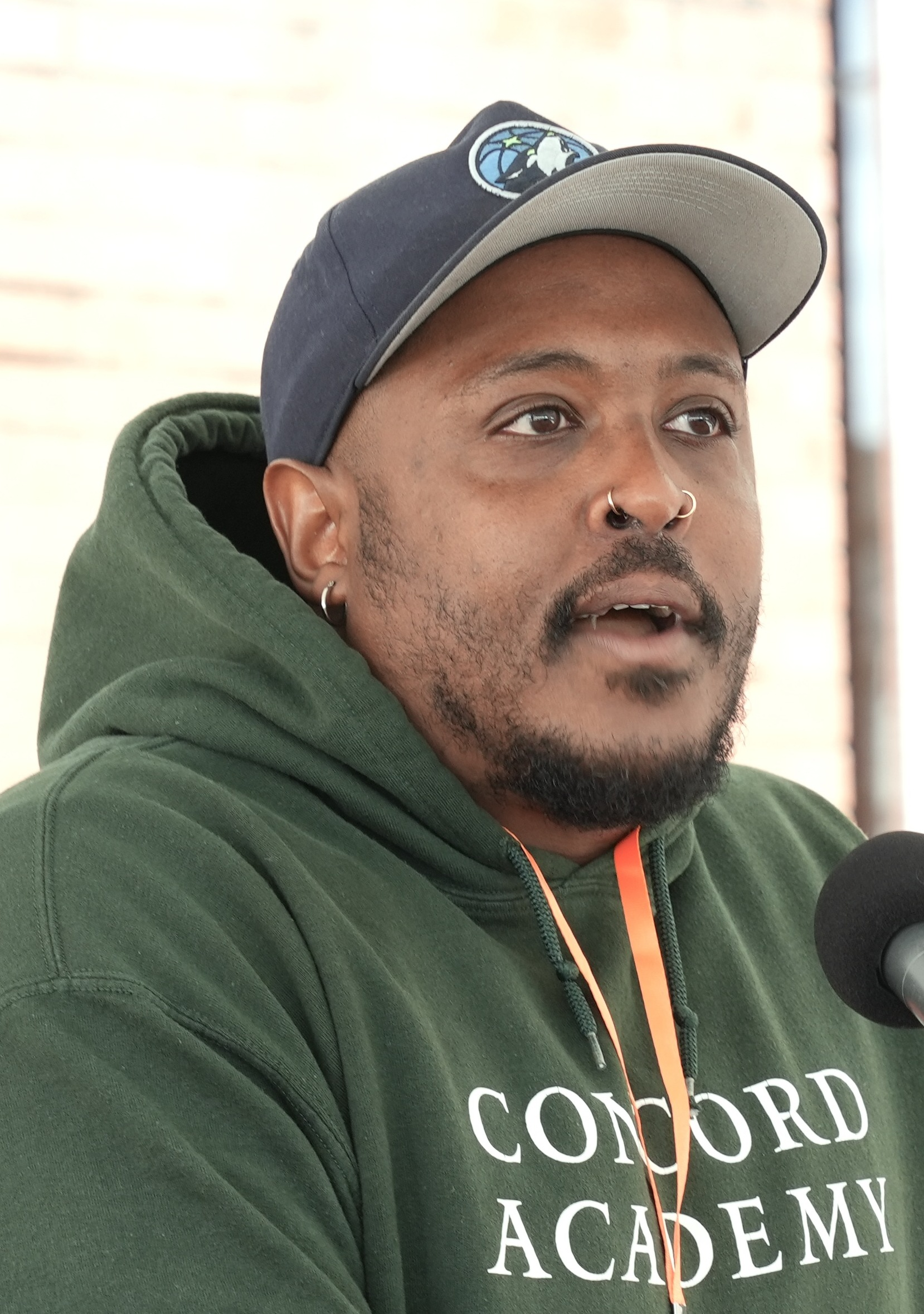
- Smith at the 2025 Los Angeles Times Festival of Books
- Born: St. Paul, Minnesota, U.S.
- Education: University of Wisconsin-Madison (B.A.); University of Michigan
- Writing career
- Genre: Poetry
- Notable works: [insert] boy Don't Call Us Dead: Poems; Homie
- Notable awards: Lambda Literary Award for Gay Poetry; Kate Tufts Discovery Award; Forward Prize
- Literary movement: Dark Noise Collective
- Website: www.danezsmithpoet.com

Danez Smith is an American poet, writer and performer from St. Paul, Minnesota. They are queer, non-binary and HIV-positive. They are the author of the poetry collections [insert] boy and Don't Call Us Dead: Poems, both of which have received multiple awards, and Homie/My Nig. Graywolf Press published Bluff, their most recent poetry collection, in 2024.

== Early life and education ==
Smith was born in St. Paul, Minnesota, and attended Saint Paul Central High School. They grew up with their mother and grandparents in the Selby Neighborhood. Their family is from Mississippi and Georgia.

Smith has said that they struggled with reading up until the third grade. A teacher told them that being able to read would allow them to read video-game magazines, which inspired Smith.

Smith was a First Wave Urban Arts Scholar at the University of Wisconsin-Madison, graduating with a BA in 2012.

== Career ==
Smith is a founding member of Dark Noise Collective with Fatimah Asghar, Franny Choi, Nate Marshall, Aaron Samuels, and Jamila Woods.

With Jamila Woods, Smith joined Macklemore for a performance on The Late Show with Stephen Colbert in February, 2016. Their writing has been published in Poetry (magazine) and Ploughshares. On March 30, 2017, Smith was the inaugural guest of the Alexander Lawrence Posey Speaker Series at the University of Central Oklahoma.

Smith is the author of three books. [insert] Boy won the 2014 Lambda Literary Award for Gay Poetry, with jurist Chase Twitchell describing Smith's poetry as "remarkable for its nervy, surprising, morally urgent poems." [insert] Boy was also selected as a Boston Globe Best Poetry Book in 2014. Smith's second book, Don't Call Us Dead: Poems, was a finalist for the 2017 National Book Award for poetry. Their third book, Homie, was a finalist for the 2020 National Book Critics Circle Award for Poetry and the 2021 NAACP Image Award for Poetry. Smith is also the author of two chapbooks, hands on ya knees (2013, Penmanship Books) and black movie (2015, Button Poetry), winner of the Button Poetry Prize.

Smith has twice been a finalist in Individual World Poetry Slam. They were a finalist in 2011 and placed second in 2014.

With Franny Choi, Smith is co-host of the poetry podcast VS from the Poetry Foundation.

Smith won a 2017 National Endowment for the Arts grant.

In 2018, Smith's sonnet sequence "summer, somewhere" received the inaugural Four Quartets Prize from the Poetry Society of America. At the age of 29, Smith also became the youngest recipient of the £10,000 Forward Prize for best poetry collection, as Don't Call Us Dead beat out works by U.S. poet laureate Tracy K. Smith and former Forward Prize-winner Vahni Capildeo. Smith serves on the board of directors for the D.C.-based poetry non-profit Split This Rock.

In 2020, Smith published a third poetry collection called Homie. Homie won the 2021 Minnesota Book Award in Poetry.

== Personal life ==
Smith is genderqueer and uses they/them pronouns.

== Works ==
=== Poems ===
- "poem where I be & you just might" (Poetry Society of America)
- "Dinosaurs in the Hood" (Poetry, December 2014)
- "the bullet was a girl" (Poem-a-Day by the Academy of American Poets, September 3, 2015)
- "Principles" (video from Brave New Voices Festival, July 2016)
- "You're Dead, America" (BuzzFeed, November 9, 2016)
- "C.R.E.A.M." (Poem-a-Day by the Academy of American Poets, February 1, 2017)
- "Don't Try Us" (Fader, May 1, 2017)
- Selection from "summer, somewhere" (The New York Times, June 9, 2017)
- "An Elegy for My Neighbor, Renee Nicole Good" (Harper's Bazaar, January 9, 2026)

=== Chapbooks ===
- hands on ya knees (2013, Penmanship Books)
- black movie (2015, Button Poetry), ISBN 978-1-943735-00-6

=== Books ===
- [insert] boy, YesYes Books (2014), ISBN 978-1936919284
- Don't Call Us Dead, Graywolf Press (2017), ISBN 978-1555977856
- Homie, Graywolf Press (2020), ISBN 978-1644450109
- Bluff, Graywolf Press (2024), ISBN 978-1-64445-298-1

=== In Anthology ===
- Ghost Fishing: An Eco-Justice Poetry Anthology (University of Georgia Press, 2018) ISBN 978-0820353159

=== Edited ===
- Blues in Stereo: The Early Works of Langston Hughes (Legacy Lit, 2024) ISBN 9781538768914

== Awards ==
- 2014 – Ruth Lilly Poetry Fellowship
- 2015 – Lambda Literary Award for Gay Poetry
- 2015—Norma Farber First Book Award, Finalist
- 2016 – Kate Tufts Discovery Award
- 2017 – NEA fellowship for creative writing
- 2017 – National Book Award for Poetry, Finalist
- 2018 – Forward Prize for Best Poetry Collection
- 2018 – Four Quartets Prize
- 2020 – National Book Critics Circle Award for Poetry, Finalist
- 2021 – NAACP Image Award for Poetry, Finalist
- 2021 – Minnesota Book Award for Poetry
- 2025 – Pulitzer Prize for Poetry, Finalist
- 2025 – Minnesota Book Award for Poetry, Finalist
