= D. A. Powell =

American poet (born 1963)

- Born: Douglas A. Powell; May 16, 1963 (age 63); Albany, Georgia, U.S.
- Education: Lindhurst High School; Sonoma State University; Iowa Writers' Workshop
- Occupation: Poet

Douglas A. Powell (born May 16, 1963) is an American poet.

== Life and career ==
Powell lived in various places growing up, then graduated high school from Lindhurst High School in Olivehurst, California. He then worked in a number of jobs before eventually settling in Santa Rosa, California, where he attended Sonoma State University. He earned a bachelor's degree in 1991 and a master's in 1993. Not long after completing his graduate work at Sonoma State, he entered the Iowa Writer's Workshop at the University of Iowa.

In 1996, he graduated from Iowa and began a career as a poet and university professor. Powell has taught at a number of different universities, including Columbia University, Sonoma State University, San Francisco State University, and Harvard University, where he served as the Briggs-Copeland Lecturer in Poetry. In 2004, Powell left Harvard for the University of San Francisco, where he teaches in the English department.

== Awards and recognition ==
In addition to serving as the Briggs-Copeland Lecturer at Harvard (itself a recognition of both creative and scholarly talent), Powell has won the Lyric Poetry Award from the Poetry Society of America, a grant for the National Endowment for the Arts, and a Paul Engle Fellowship. His second collection, Lunch, was a finalist for the National Poetry Series, and his third book, Cocktails, was a finalist for the National Book Critics Circle Award for Poetry.

On February 3, 2010, after the publication of Chronic in 2009, Claremont Graduate University announced that Powell had won its prestigious Kingsley Tufts Poetry Award. Chronic also won the 2009 Northern California Book Award and the 2009 California Book Award.

He is a 2011 Guggenheim Fellow.

His poetry collection Useless Landscape, or A Guide for Boys won the National Book Critics Circle Award (2012).

In 2019, Powell received the John Updike Award from the American Academy of Arts and Letters.

== Work ==
Considered by some an experimental poet, Powell mixes both conventional and non-conventional techniques. For example, his early poems do not have titles; the first lines serve as the poems' working titles. He also does not capitalize the first letter of a new sentence; in this sense, he is reminiscent of E. E. Cummings. His work often moves back and forth between popular culture like movies and music and more complicated themes like religion and AIDS; he uses numerous rhetorical devices, especially puns, as bridges between these two spheres of experience. Powell's first three books of poems are considered a kind of trilogy on the AIDS epidemic.

Writing in The New York Times, critic Stephanie Burt said of Powell's work, "No accessible poet of his generation is half as original, and no poet as original is this accessible."

== Bibliography ==
=== Poetry ===
- —— (1998). Tea. Wesleyan University Press. ISBN 9780819563347.
- —— (2000). Lunch. Wesleyan University Press. ISBN 9780819564276.
- —— (2004). Cocktails. Graywolf Press. ISBN 9781555973957.
- —— (2009). Chronic. Graywolf Press. ISBN 9781555975166.
- —— (2012). Useless Landscape, or A Guide for Boys. Graywolf Press. ISBN 9781555976057.

=== Anthologies ===
- Kevin Prufer, ed. (2000). The New Young American Poets: An Anthology. SIU Press. pp. 137–142. ISBN 9780809323098.

=== Prose ===
- —— (2009). By Myself: An Autobiography. Turtle Point Press.
