= Lambda Literary Award for Gay Poetry =

Annual literary award

- Awarded for: Literary award
- Sponsored by: Lambda Literary Foundation
- Date: Annual

The Lambda Literary Award for Gay Poetry is an annual literary award presented by the Lambda Literary Foundation to a gay-themed book of poetry by a male writer.

At the first two Lambda Literary Awards in 1989 and 1990, a single award for LGBT Poetry, irrespective of gender, was presented. Beginning with the 3rd Lambda Literary Awards in 1991, the poetry award was split into two separate awards for Gay Poetry and Lesbian Poetry. These separate awards have been presented continuously since then, with exception of the 20th Lambda Literary Awards in 2008, when a merged LGBTQ poetry award was again presented for that year only.

== Honorees ==
Lambda Literary Award for Gay Poetry winners and finalists
Year	Author	Title	Result	Ref.
1991	Michael Lassell	Decade Dance	Winner	
1991	Francisco X. Alarcón	Body in Flames	Finalist	
1991	Mark Ameen	Buried Body	Finalist	
1991	Kenny Fries	Healing Notebooks	Finalist	
1991	James Broughton	Special Deliveries	Finalist	
1992	Assotto Saint (ed.)	The Road Before Us: 100 Gay Black Poets	Winner	
1992	Mark Doty	Bethlehem in Broad Daylight	Finalist	
1992	David Trinidad	Hand Over Heart	Finalist	
1992	Perry Brass	Sex-Charge	Finalist	
1992	John Ash	The Burnt Pages	Finalist	
1993	Edward Field	Counting Myself Lucky	Winner	
1993	Essex Hemphill	Ceremonies	Finalist	
1993	Rudy Kikel	Long Division	Finalist	
1993	Tim Dlugos	Strong Place	Finalist	
1993	Thom Gunn	The Man with Night Sweats	Finalist	
1994	Michael Klein	1990	Winner (tie)	
1994	James Schuyler	Collected Poems	Winner (tie)	
1994	Mark Doty	My Alexandria	Finalist	
1994	William Bory	Orpheus in his Underwear	Finalist	
1994	Carl Cook	Tranquil Lake of Love	Finalist	
1995	Thom Gunn	Collected Poems	Winner	
1995	Richard McCann	Ghost Letters	Finalist	
1995	Rafael Campo	The Other Man Was Me	Finalist	
1995	Paul Monette	West of Yesterday, East of Summer	Finalist	
1995	Assotto Saint	Wishing for Wings	Finalist	
1996	Mark Doty	Atlantis	Winner	
1996	David Laurents	Badboy Book of Erotic Verse	Finalist	
1996	Timothy Liu	Burnt Offerings	Finalist	
1996	Carl Phillips	Cortege	Finalist	
1996	James Merrill	Scattering of Salts	Finalist	
1997	Rafael Campo	What the Body Told	Winner	
1997	Kenny Fries	Anesthesia	Finalist	
1997	Reginald Shepherd	Angel, Interrupted	Finalist	
1997	Michael Lassell	Eros in Boystown	Finalist	
1997	Jaime Manrique	My Night With Federico Garcia Lorca	Finalist	
1998	Cyrus Cassells	Beautiful Signor	Winner	
1998	Justin Chin	Bite Hard	Finalist	
1998	Frank Bidart	Desire	Finalist	
1998	Tom Carey	Desire: Poems 1986-1996	Finalist	
1998	James Broughton (ed. Jim Cory)	Packing Up for Paradise: Selected Poems 1946-1996	Finalist	
1999	J. D. McClatchy	Ten Commandments	Winner	
1999	Michael Lassell	A Flame for the Touch That Matters	Finalist	
1999	Edward Field	A Frieze for a Temple of Love	Finalist	
1999	Timothy Liu	Say Goodnight	Finalist	
1999	Mark Doty	Sweet Machine	Finalist	
2000	Mark Wunderlich	The Anchorage	Winner (tie)	
2000	Richard Howard	Trappings	Winner (tie)	
2000	Rafael Campo	Diva	Finalist	
2000	Marvin K. White	Last Rights	Finalist	
2000	G. Winston James	Lyric	Finalist	
2001	Carl Phillips	Pastoral	Winner	
2001	Thom Gunn	Boss Cupid	Finalist	
2001	David Trinidad	Plasticville	Finalist	
2001	Michael Lassell and Elena Georgiou	The World in Us	Finalist	
2001	Timothy Liu	Word of Mouth	Finalist	
2002	Mark Doty	Source	Winner	
2002	Constantine Cavafy with Theoharis C. Theoharis (trans.)	Before Time Could Change Them	Finalist	
2002	Timothy Liu	Hard Evidence	Finalist	
2002	Justin Chin	Harmless Medicine	Finalist	
2002	J. D. McClatchy	Love Speaks Its Name	Finalist	
2003	J. D. McClatchy	Hazmat	Winner	
2003	Rafael Campo	Landscape with Human Figure	Finalist	
2003	Reginald Harris	Ten Tongues	Finalist	
2003	Krandall Kraus	The Christmas Poems	Finalist	
2003	David Groff	Theory of Devolution	Finalist	
2004	Mark Bibbins	Sky Lounge	Winner	
2004	Henri Cole	Middle Earth	Finalist	
2004	Reginald Shepherd	Otherhood: Poems	Finalist	
2004	Peter Pereira	Saying the World	Finalist	
2004	Rafael Campo	The Healing Art	Finalist	
2005	Luis Cernuda	Written in Water	Winner	
2005	D. A. Powell	Cocktails	Finalist	
2005	Marvin K. White	nothin' ugly fly	Finalist	
2005	Carl Phillips	The Rest of Love	Finalist	
2005	Mark Wunderlich	Voluntary Servitude	Finalist	
2006	Richard Siken	Crush	Winner	
2006	Aaron Smith	Blue on Blue Ground	Finalist	
2006	Timothy Liu	For Dust Thou Art	Finalist	
2006	Mark Doty	School of the Arts	Finalist	
2006	Martin Pousson	Sugar	Finalist	
2007	Jim Elledge	A History of My Tattoo	Winner	
2007	Justin Chin	Gutted	Finalist	
2007	Rigoberto González	Other Fugitives & Other Strangers	Finalist	
2007	Jeffrey Conway	The Album That Changed My Life	Finalist	
2007	Dwaine Rieves	When the Eye Forms	Finalist	
2008	No award presented			
2009	Mark Doty	Fire to Fire	Winner (tie)	
2009	James Allen Hall	Now You're the Enemy	Winner (tie)	
2009	Jack Spicer (Peter Gizzi and Kevin Killian, eds.)	My Vocabulary Did This to Me: The Collected Poetry of Jack Spicer	Finalist	
2009	Jericho Brown	Please	Finalist	
2009	Rick Barot	Want	Finalist	
2010	Benjamin S. Grossberg	Sweet Core Orchard	Winner	
2010	Randall Mann	Breakfast with Thom Gunn	Finalist	
2010	Brent Goodman	The Brother Swimming Beneath Me	Finalist	
2010	Charles Jensen	The First Risk	Finalist	
2010	Tom Healy	What the Right Hand Knows	Finalist	
2011	Brian Teare	Pleasure	Winner	
2011	Greg Hewett	darkacre	Finalist	
2011	James Schuyler	Other Flowers: Uncollected Poems	Finalist	
2011	James L. White	The Salt Ecstasies	Finalist	
2011	Michael Klein	then, we were still living	Finalist	
2012	Tim Dlugos (David Trinidad, ed.)	A Fast Life: The Collected Poems of Tim Dlugos	Winner	
2012	David Trinidad	Dear Prudence: New and Selected Poems	Finalist	
2012	Carl Phillips	Double Shadow	Finalist	
2012	Thomas Meyer	Kintsugi	Finalist	
2012	Paul Legault	The Other Poems	Finalist	
2013	Stephen S. Mills	He Do the Gay Man in Different Voices	Winner	
2013	Aaron Smith	Appetite	Finalist	
2013	Richard Blanco	Looking for the Gulf Motel	Finalist	
2013	Patrick Donnelly	Nocturnes of the Brothel of Ruin	Finalist	
2013	Eduardo C. Corral	Slow Lightning	Finalist	
2014	Rigoberto González	Unpeopled Eden	Winner	
2014	Rafael Campo	Alternative Medicine	Finalist	
2014	David Groff	Clay	Finalist	
2014	Brian Teare	Companion Grasses	Finalist	
2014	Frank Bidart	Metaphysical Dog	Finalist	
2014	Angelo Nikolopoulos	Obscenely Yours	Finalist	
2014	Carl Phillips	Silverchest	Finalist	
2014	Randall Mann	Straight Razor	Finalist	
2014	Michael D. Snediker	The Apartment of Tragic Appliances	Finalist	
2014	Michael Klein	The Talking Day	Finalist	
2015	Danez Smith	[insert] boy	Winner	
2015	David J. Daniels	Clean	Finalist	
2015	Timothy Liu	Don't Go Back to Sleep	Finalist	
2015	C. A. Conrad	ECODEVIANCE: (Soma)tics for the Future Wilderness	Finalist	
2015	Saeed Jones	Prelude to Bruise	Finalist	
2015	Jericho Brown	The New Testament	Finalist	
2015	Michael Broder	This Life Now	Finalist	
2015	Hieu Minh Nguyen	This Way to the Sugar	Finalist	
2016	Nicholas Wong	Crevasse	Winner (tie)	
2016	Carl Phillips	Reconnaissance	Winner (tie)	
2016	Roberto F. Santiago	Angel Park	Finalist	
2016	Rickey Laurentiis	Boy with Thorn	Finalist	
2016	Francisco X. Alarcón	Canto Hondo/Deep Song	Finalist	
2016	Ben Ladouceur	Otter	Finalist	
2016	Jee Leong Koh	Steep Tea	Finalist	
2016	Ralph Hamilton	Teaching a Man to Unstick His Tail	Finalist	
2017	Phillip B. Williams	Thief in the Interior	Winner	
2017	Bryan Borland	DIG	Finalist	
2017	Ocean Vuong	Night Sky with Exit Wounds	Finalist	
2017	Aaron Smith	Primer	Finalist	
2017	Sjohnna McCray	Rapture	Finalist	
2017	C. Dale Young	The Halo	Finalist	
2017	Rajiv Mohabir	The Taxidermist's Cut	Finalist	
2017	Derrick Austin	Trouble the Water	Finalist	
2018	C. A. Conrad	While Standing in Line for Death	Winner	
2018	Danez Smith	Don't Call Us Dead	Finalist	
2018	Charif Shanahan	Into Each Room We Enter without Knowing	Finalist	
2018	Tommy Pico	Nature Poem	Finalist	
2018	Randall Mann	Proprietary	Finalist	
2018	Cedar Sigo	Royals	Finalist	
2018	Frederick Speers	So Far Afield	Finalist	
2018	Chen Chen	When I Grow Up I Want to Be a List of Further Possibilities	Finalist	
2019	Justin Phillip Reed	Indecency	Winner	
2019	Aldrin Valdez	ESL or You Weren't Here	Finalist	
2019	Kazim Ali	Inquisition	Finalist	
2019	Tommy Pico	Junk	Finalist	
2019	Hieu Minh Nguyen	Not Here	Finalist	
2019	Jonah Mixon-Webster	Stereo(TYPE)	Finalist	
2019	Brane Mozetič	Unfinished Sketches of a Revolution (tr. Barbara Jursa)	Finalist	
2019	Carl Phillips	Wild Is the Wind	Finalist	
2020	Cyrée Jarelle Johnson	Slingshot	Winner	
2020	Brian Teare	Doomstead Days	Finalist	
2020	Jake Skeets	Eyes Bottle Dark with a Mouthful of Flowers	Finalist	
2020	Gabriel Ojeda-Sagué	Losing Miami	Finalist	
2020	Billy-Ray Belcourt	NDN Coping Mechanisms: Notes from the Field	Finalist	
2020	Lawrence Lacambra Ypil	The Experiment of the Tropics	Finalist	
2020	Douglas Crane	The Revisionist & The Astropastorals	Finalist	
2020	Jericho Brown	The Tradition	Finalist	
2021	Eduardo C. Corral	Guillotine	Winner	
2021	Tommye Blount	Fantasia for the Man in Blue	Finalist	
2021	Romeo Oriogun	Sacrament of Bodies	Finalist	
2021	Ted Rees	Thanksgiving: A Poem	Finalist	
2021	Justin Phillip Reed	The Malevolent Volume	Finalist	
2022	John Keene	Punks: New & Selected Poems	Winner	
2022	Nicholas Wong	Besiege Me	Finalist	
2022	Michael Walsh	Creep Love	Finalist	
2022	Miguel Murphy	Shoreditch	Finalist	
2022	Derrick Austin	Tenderness	Finalist	
2023	Padraig Regan	Some Integrity	Winner	
2023	Saeed Jones	Alive at the End of the World	Finalist	
2023	Aldo Amparán	Brother Sleep	Finalist	
2023	Angelo Nikolopoulos	Pleasure	Finalist	
2023	Chris Tse	Super Model Minority	Finalist	
2024	Charif Shanahan	Trace Evidence	Winner	
2024	Paul Stephenson	Hard Drive	Finalist	
2024	Richard Blanco	Homeland of My Body: New and Selected Poems		
2024	Emanuel Xavier	Love(ly) Child		
2024	Grant Chemidlin	What We Lost in the Swamp		
2025	Saul Hernandez	How to Kill a Goat and Other Monsters	Winner	
2025	Joshua Garcia	Pentimento	Finalist	
2025	Blas Falconer	Rara Avis	Finalist	
2025	Carl Phillips	Scattered Snows to the North	Finalist	
2025	Okwudili Nebeolisa	Terminal Maladies	Finalist	
2026	Ben Kline	It Was Never Supposed To Be	Winner	
2026	Gustavo Hernandez	Bachelor	Finalist	
2026	W. J. Lofton	boy maybe: poems		
2026	Pádraig Ó Tuama	Kitchen Hymns		
2026	Rajiv Mohabir	Seabeast		

== See also ==
- Thom Gunn Award
