= Lambda Literary Award for Gay Memoir or Biography =

Annual literary award

Lambda Literary Award for Gay Memoir/Biography
- Awarded for: Literary award
- Sponsored by: Lambda Literary Foundation
- Date: Annual
- Website: lambdaliterary.org/awards/

The Lambda Literary Award for Gay Memoir/Biography is an annual literary award, presented by the Lambda Literary Foundation, to a memoir, biography, autobiography, or works of creative nonfiction by or about gay men. Works published posthumously and/or written with co-authors are eligible, but anthologies are not.

Between 1994 and 2000, the award was given for gay biography/autobiography. From 2002–2006, there was no gay biography/autobiography category (and also no lesbian biography/autobiography category) but rather separate categories for biography and for autobiography/memoir. In 2007, the gay memoir/biography category was created (as was the lesbian memoir/biography category).

== Recipients ==
List of Lambda Literary Award for Gay Memoir/Biography Recipients
Year	Author	Title	Result	Ref.
1994	Edmund White	Genet	Winner	
1994	Brad Gooch	City Poet:The Life and Times of Frank O'Hara	Finalist	
1994	Lars Eighner	Travels With Lizbeth	Finalist	
1994	Reinaldo Arenas	Before Night Falls	Finalist	
1994	James Broughton	Coming Unbuttoned	Finalist	
1995	Abraham Verghese	My Own Country	Winner	
1995	Ned Rorem	Knowing When to Stop	Finalist	
1995	Lawrence Mass	Confessions of a Jewish Wagnerite	Finalist	
1995	Paul Monette	Last Watch of the Night	Finalist	
1995	John Preston	My Life as a Pornographer	Finalist	
1996	Lyle Leverich	Tom: The Unknown Tennessee Williams	Winner	
1996	Bill T. Jones with Peggy Gillespie	Last Night on Earth	Finalist	
1996	Gore Vidal	Palimpsest	Finalist	
1996	Edmund White	Our Paris	Finalist	
1996	Leroy Aarons	Prayers for Bobby	Finalist	
1997	Fenton Johnson	Geography of the Heart	Winner	
1997	David Hajdu	Lush Life	Finalist	
1997	Assotto Saint	Spells of a Voodoo Doll	Finalist	
1997	Bernard Cooper	Truth Serum	Finalist	
1997	Mark Doty	Heaven’s Coast	Finalist	
1998	Rafael Campo	The Poetry of Healing	Winner	
1998	Gary Schmidgall	Walt Whitman: a Gay Life	Finalist	
1998	Felice Picano	A House on the Ocean, A House on the Bay	Finalist	
1998	Michael Klein	Track Conditions	Finalist	
1998	Mark Thompson	Gay Body: a Journey Through Shadow to Self	Finalist	
1999	William J. Mann	Wisecracker	Winner	
1999	Gavin Geoffrey Dillard	In The Flesh	Finalist	
1999	Norman Page	Auden and Isherwood: The Berlin Years	Finalist	
1999	Andrew Tobias	The Best Little Boy in the World Grows Up	Finalist	
1999	Graham Caveney	Gentleman Junkie: The Life and Legacy of William S. Burroughs	Finalist	
2000	Jesse Green	The Velveteen Father	Winner	
2000	Gad Beck	An Underground Life: Memoirs of a Gay Jew in Nazi Berlin	Finalist	
2000	Mark Doty	Firebird: A Memoir	Finalist	
2000	Fred Kaplan	Gore Vidal	Finalist	
2000	Martin Duberman	Left Out: The Politics of Exclusion	Finalist	
2001	Douglas Murray	Bosie	Winner	
2001	Jean-Yves Tadie	Marcel Proust	Finalist	
2001	David Mixner	Brave Journeys	Finalist	
2001	Jay Quinn	The Mentor	Finalist	
2001	Ned Rorem	Lies	Finalist	
2007	Bernard Cooper	The Bill From My Father	Winner	
2007	Alan Bennett	Untold Stories	Finalist	
2007	Jonathan Silin	My Father’s Keeper: The Story of a Gay Son and His Aging Parents	Finalist	
2007	Kim Powers	History of Swimming	Finalist	
2007	Patrick Moore	Tweaked: A Crystal Meth Memoir	Finalist	
2008	Kevin Sessums	Mississippi Sissy	Winner	
2008	Aaron Raz Link and Hilda Raz	What Becomes You	Finalist	
2008	Kenny Fries	The History of My Shoes and the Evolution of Darwin’s Theory	Finalist	
2008	Mark Doty	Dog Years	Finalist	
2008	Martin Duberman	The Worlds of Lincoln Kirstein	Finalist	
2008	Thom Bierdz	Forgiving Troy	Finalist	
2009	Sheila Rowbotham	Edward Carpenter: A Life of Liberty and Love	Winner	
2009	Aaron Cooper	Bringing Him Home	Finalist	
2009	Aaron Shurin	King of Shadows	Finalist	
2009	Bob Morris	Assisted Loving: True Tales of Double Dating with My Dad	Finalist	
2009	Joel Derfner	Swish	Finalist	
2010	Reynolds Price	Ardent Spirits: Leaving Home, Coming Back	Winner	
2010	David Plante	The Pure Lover: A Memoir of Grief	Finalist	
2010	Douglas A. Martin	Once You Go Back	Finalist	
2010	Edmund White	City Boy: My Life in New York During the 1960’s and 70’s	Finalist	
2010	Jon Ginoli	Deflowered: My Life in Pansy Division	Finalist	
2011	Justin Spring	Secret Historian	Winner	
2011	Bryan Batt	She Ain’t Heavy, She’s My Mother	Finalist	
2011	Gale Chester Whittington	Beyond Normal: The Birth of Gay Pride	Finalist	
2011	R. Tripp Evans	Grant Wood: A Life	Finalist	
2011	Selina Hastings	The Secret Lives of Somerset Maugham	Finalist	
2012	Glen Retief	The Jack Bank: A Memoir of a South African Childhood	Winner	
2012	Charles Silverstein	For the Ferryman: A Personal History	Finalist	
2012	Michael Schiavi	Celluloid Activist: The Life and Times of Vito Russo	Finalist	
2012	Ryan Van Meter	If You Knew Then What I Know Now	Finalist	
2012	William E. Jones	Halsted Plays Himself	Finalist	
2013	Cynthia Carr	Fire in the Belly: The Life and Times of David Wojnarowicz	Winner	
2013	Charles Rowan Beye	My Husband and My Wives: A Gay Man’s Odyssey	Finalist	
2013	Kamal Al-Solaylee	Intolerable	Finalist	
2013	Mutsuo Takahashi with Jeffrey Angles (trans.)	Twelve Views from the Distance	Finalist	
2013	Reynolds Price	Midstream: An Unfinished Memoir	Finalist	
2013	Ron Padgett (editor)	The Collected Writings of Joe Brainard	Finalist	
2014	Jerry Rosco (editor)	A Heaven of Words	Winner	
2014	Alysia Abbott	Fairyland: A Memoir of My Father	Finalist	
2014	Blake Bailey	Farther and Wilder: The Lost Weekends and Literary Dreams of Charles Jackson	Finalist	
2014	David Margolick	Dreadful: The Short Life and Gay Times of John Horne Burns	Finalist	
2014	Didier Eribon	Returning to Reims	Finalist	
2014	Hilary Holladay	American Hipster	Finalist	
2014	Jim Elledge	Henry Darger, Throwaway Boy: The Tragic Life of an Outsider Artist	Finalist	
2014	Perry N. Halkitis	The AIDS Generation: Stories of Survival and Resilience	Finalist	
2014	Richard Rodriguez	Darling: A Spiritual Autobiography	Finalist	
2014	Tim Teeman	In Bed With Gore Vidal	Finalist	
2015	John Lahr	Tennessee Williams: Mad Pilgrimage of the Flesh	Winner (tie)	
2015	Richard Blanco	The Prince of Los Cocuyos	Winner (tie)	
2015	Alain Mabanckou with Sara Meli Ansari (trans.)	Letter to Jimmy	Finalist	
2015	Brent Phillips	Charles Walters: The Director Who Made Hollywood Dance	Finalist	
2015	Edmund White	Inside a Pearl: My Years in Paris	Finalist	
2015	Philip Gefter	Wagstaff: Before and After Mapplethorpe	Finalist	
2015	Rob Smith	Closets, Combat and Coming Out	Finalist	
2015	Sean Strub	Body Counts: A Memoir of Politics, Sex, AIDS, and Survival	Finalist	
2016	Langdon Hammer	James Merrill: Life and Art	Winner	
2016	Arsham Parsi and Marc Colbourne	Exiled for Love: The Journey of an Iranian Queer Activist	Finalist	
2016	Bernard Cooper	My Avant-Garde Education: A Memoir	Finalist	
2016	Brad Gooch	Smash Cut	Finalist	
2016	Jameson Currier	Until My Heart Stops	Finalist	
2016	Jean Findlay	Chasing Lost Time: The Life of C. K. Scott Moncrieff: Soldier, Spy, and Translator	Finalist	
2016	Matthew Spender	A House in St. John’s Wood	Finalist	
2016	Michael V. Smith	My Body Is Yours	Finalist	
2017	Cleve Jones	When We Rise	Winner	
2017	Augusten Burroughs	Lust & Wonder	Finalist	
2017	Brian Blanchfield	Proxies	Finalist	
2017	Frederic Spotts	Cursed Legacy: The Tragic Life of Klaus Mann	Finalist	
2017	Garrard Conley	Boy Erased: A Memoir	Finalist	
2017	Joseph Osmundson	Capsid: A Love Song	Finalist	
2017	Michael Schreiber	One Man Show: The Life and Art of Bernard Perlin	Finalist	
2017	Will Schwalbe	Books For Living	Finalist	
2018	Chike Frankie Edozien	Lives of Great Men	Winner	
2018	Alan Bennett	Keeping On Keeping On	Finalist	
2018	Bill Goldstein	The World Broke in Two	Finalist	
2018	Casey Gerald	There Will Be No Miracles Here	Finalist	
2018	Jonathan Alexander	Creep: A Life, a Theory, an Apology	Finalist	
2018	José Antonio Rodríguez	House Built on Ashes	Finalist	
2018	Kenny Fries	In the Province of the Gods	Finalist	
2018	Parvez Sharma	A Sinner in Mecca: A Gay Muslim’s Hajj of Defiance	Finalist	
2018	Victor Corona	Night Class	Finalist	
2019	Darnell L. Moore	No Ashes in the Fire	Winner	
2019	Alexander Chee	How to Write an Autobiographical Novel	Finalist	
2019	Deray Mckesson	On the Other Side of Freedom: The Case for Hope	Finalist	
2019	Edmund White	The Unpunished Vice: A Life of Reading	Finalist	
2019	Jeffrey C. Stewart	The New Negro: The Life of Alain Locke	Finalist	
2019	Jerry Torre and Tony Maietta	The Marble Faun of Grey Gardens	Finalist	
2019	Lillian Faderman	Harvey Milk: His Lives and Death	Finalist	
2020	Saeed Jones	How We Fight for Our Lives	Winner	
2020	Alvin Orloff	DISASTERAMA! Adventures in the Queer Underground 1977-1997	Finalist	
2020	Chris Rush	The Light Years	Finalist	
2020	Guy Hocquenghem with Max Fox (trans.)	The Amphitheater of the Dead	Finalist	
2020	Isaac Mizrahi	I.M.	Finalist	
2020	James Oseland	Jimmy Neurosis	Finalist	
2020	Joseph Caldwell	In the Shadow of the Bridge	Finalist	
2020	Siddharth Dube	An Indefinite Sentence	Finalist	
2021	Mohsin Zaidi	A Dutiful Boy	Winner	
2021	Billy-Ray Belcourt	A History of My Brief Body	Finalist	
2021	François S. Clemmons	Officer Clemmons: A Memoir	Finalist	
2021	John Birdsall	The Man Who Ate Too Much: The Life of James Beard	Finalist	
2021	R. Eric Thomas	Here For It: Or, How to Save Your Soul in America	Finalist	
2022	Brian Broome	Punch Me Up to the Gods: A Memoir	Winner	
2022	Rajiv Mohabir	Antiman: A Hybrid Memoir	Finalist	
2022	John Paul Brammer	Hola Papi	Finalist	
2022	Peter Staley	Never Silent: ACT UP and My Life in Activism	Finalist	
2022	Luis Felipe Fabre with JD Pluecker (trans.)	Writing with Caca / Escribir con Caca	Finalist	
2023	Edgar Gomez	High-Risk Homosexual	Winner	
2023	Seán Hewitt	All Down Darkness Wide: A Memoir	Finalist	
2023	Jim Elledge	An Angel in Sodom	Finalist	
2023	Ron Goldberg	Boy with the Bullhorn: A Memoir and History of ACT UP New York	Finalist	
2023	Jesse Leon	I’m Not Broken	Finalist	
2024	Jason Yamas	Tweakerworld	Winner	
2024	Charles Busch	Leading Lady: A Memoir of a Most Unusual Boy	Finalist	
2024	Greg Marshall	Leg: The Story of a Limb and the Boy Who Grew from It	Finalist	
2024	Jedidiah Jenkins	Mother, Nature	Finalist	
2024	Martin Duberman	Reaching Ninety	Finalist	
2025	Brad Gooch	RADIANT: The Life and Line of Keith Haring	Winner	
2025	Darius Stewart	Be Not Afraid of My Body: A Lyrical Memoir	Finalist	
2025	Komail Aijazuddin	Manboobs: A Memoir of Musicals, Visas, Hope, and Cake	Finalist	
2025	Michael Nott	Thom Gunn	Finalist	
2025	Michael G. Lee	When the Band Played On	Finalist	
2026	Thomas Dai	TAKE MY NAME BUT SAY IT SLOW: ESSAYS	Winner	
2026	Edgar Gomez	Alligator Tears	Finalist	
2026	Jeremy Atherton Lin	Deep House: The Gayest Love Story Ever Told	Finalist	
2026	Martin Sherman	On the Boardwalk	Finalist	
2026	Daniel Brook	The Einstein of Sex: Dr. Magnus Hirschfeld, Visionary of Weimar Berlin	Finalist	
