= 28th Lambda Literary Awards =

2016 literary awards ceremony

The 28th Lambda Literary Awards were held on June 6, 2016, to honour works of LGBT literature published in 2015. The list of nominees was released on March 8.

== Special awards ==
Category	Winner
Pioneer Award	Eileen Myles
Judith A. Markowitz Emerging Writer Award	Bryan Borland, JP Howard
Trustee Award	Hilton Als

== Nominees and winners ==
Category	Winner	Nominated
Bisexual Literature	Emily Bingham, Irrepressible: The Jazz Age Life of Henrietta Bingham; Anna North, The Life and Death of Sophie Stark	Jeanette Winterson, The Gap of Time; Zoe Pilger, Eat My Heart Out; Kevin Hogan, My Riastrad
Gay Erotica	Miodrag Kojadinovic, Érotiques Suprèmes	Jennifer Levine and Rian Darcy, Charming: Modern Gay Fairytales; Natty Soltesz, College Dive Bar, 1 AM; William Holden, Grave Desires; Michael Ampersant, Green Eyes — an erotic novel (sort-of)
Gay Fiction	Hasan Namir, God in Pink	Andy Sinclair, Breathing Lessons; Truman Capote, The Early Stories of Truman Capote; Paul Russell, Immaculate Blue; Mark Merlis, JD; Michael Golding, A Poet of the Invisible World; John Whittier Treat, The Rise and Fall of the Yellow House; James Sie, Still Life, Las Vegas
Gay Memoir/Biography	Langdon Hammer, James Merrill: Life and Art	Jean Findlay, Chasing Lost Time: The Life of C. K. Scott Moncrieff: Soldier, Spy, and Translator; Arsham Parsi and Marc Colbourne, Exiled for Love: The Journey of an Iranian Queer Activist; Matthew Spender, The House in St. John’s Wood; Bernard Cooper, My Avant-Garde Education; Michael V. Smith, My Body Is Yours; Brad Gooch, Smash Cut; Jameson Currier, Until My Heart Stops
Gay Mystery	Marshall Thornton, Boystown 7: Bloodlines	Jeffrey Round, After the Horses; Tom Mendicino, The Boys from Eighth and Carpenter; Jon Wilson, Cheap as Beasts; Wallace Godfrey, Introducing Sunfish & Starfish: Tropical Drag Queen Detectives; Rhys Ford, Murder and Mayhem; Christopher Bollen, Orient; Robert Karjel, The Swede
Gay Poetry	Nicholas Wong, Crevasse; Carl Phillips, Reconnaissance	Roberto F. Santiago, Angel Park; Rickey Laurentiis, Boy with Thorn; Francisco X. Alarcón, Canto Hondo/Deep Song; Ben Ladouceur, Otter; Jee Leong Koh, Steep Tea; Ralph Hamilton, Teaching a Man to Unstick His Tail
Gay Romance	Debbie McGowan, When Skies Have Fallen	Vanessa North, Blueberry Boys; Ralph Josiah Bardsley, Brothers; Alexis Hall, For Real; L. A. Witt, General Misconduct; Garrett Leigh, Misfits; Jay Bell, Something Like Stories, Volume One; Brad Boney, Yes
Lesbian Erotica	Meghan O'Brien, The Muse	Salome Wilde and Talon Rihai, Desire Behind Bars: Lesbian Prison Erotica; Sinclair Sexsmith, Sweet & Rough: Queer Kink Erotica
Lesbian Fiction	Chinelo Okparanta, Under the Udala Trees	Virginie Despentes, Apocalypse Baby; Mecca Jamilah Sullivan, Blue Talk and Love; Tiya Miles, The Cherokee Rose; Miranda July, The First Bad Man; LaShonda Katrice Barnett, Jam on the Vine; Debra Busman, Like a Woman; Violette Leduc, Thérèse and Isabelle
Lesbian Memoir/Biography	Kate Carroll de Gutes, Objects in the Mirror Are Closer Than They Appear	Cat Cora, Cooking as Fast as I Can: A Chef’s Story of Family, Food, and Forgiveness; Leah Lakshmi Piepzna-Samarasinha, Dirty River; Carrie Brownstein, Hunger Makes Me a Modern Girl; Allison Gruber, You’re Not Edith
Lesbian Mystery	Ann Aptaker, Tarnished Gold; Victoria Brownworth, Ordinary Mayhem	Ellen Hart, The Grave Soul; Stevie Mikayne, Illicit Artifacts; Cari Hunter, No Good Reason; Lee Winter, The Red Files; Debra Hyde, The Tattered Heiress
Lesbian Poetry	Dawn Lundy Martin, Life in a Box is a Pretty Life	Melissa Buzzeo, The Devastation; Claudia Rodriguez, Everybody’s Bread; Sara Jane Stoner, Experience in the Medium of Destruction; Margot Douaihy, Girls Like You; Jessica Jacobs, Pelvis with Distance; J. P. Howard, Say/Mirror: Poems and Histories; Stephanie Gray, Shorthand and Electric Language Stars
Lesbian Romance	Julie Blair, Making a Comeback	Shelley Thrasher, Autumn Spring; Andrea Bramhall, The Chameleon’s Tale; Dillon Watson, Full Circle; Rachel Spangler, Heart of the Game; Jackie D. Bold, Infiltration; Blythe H. Warren, My Best Friend’s Girl; Amy Dunne, The Renegade
LGBT Anthology	Damien Luxe, Heather M. Ács and Sabina Ibarrola, Glitter and Grit: Queer Performance from the Heels on Wheels Femme Galaxy; Sfé R. Monster and Taneka Stotts, Beyond: The Queer Sci-Fi & Fantasy Comic Anthology	Holly Hughes, Carmelita Tropicana and Jill Dolan, Memories of the Revolution; Amy L. Stone and Jaime Cantrell, Out of the Closet, Into the Archives: Researching Sexual Histories; Julie Bozza, A Pride of Poppies: Modern GLBTQI Fiction of the Great War; Nívea Castro and Geny Cabral, Soy Lesbiana y Que! Out Latina Lesbians; Torsten Højer, Speak My Language, and Other Stories: An Anthology of Gay Fiction; Merritt k, Videogames for Humans: Twine Authors in Conversation
LGBT Children's/Young Adult	Alex Gino, George	Sarah McCarry, About a Girl; Will Walton, Anything Could Happen; Jerome Pohlen, Gay and Lesbian History for Kids: The Century-Long Struggle for LGBT Rights; Brian Selznick, The Marvels; Adam Silvera, More Happy Than Not; I. W. Gregorio, None of the Above; Becky Albertalli, Simon vs. the Homo Sapiens Agenda
LGBT Debut Fiction	Victor Yates, A Love Like Blood	Austin Bunn, The Brink; Mark S. Luckie, Do U.; Paul Brownsey, His Steadfast Love and Other Stories; Ioannis Pappos, Hotel Living; Meliza Bañales, Life is Wonderful, People are Terrific; James Driggers, Lovesick; Libby Ware, Lum
LGBT Drama	Tanya Barfield, Bright Half Life	Jeanine Tesori and Lisa Kron, Fun Home; Taylor Mac, Hir; Deborah Salem Smith, Love Alone; Bathsheba Doran, The Mystery of Love and Sex
LGBT Graphic Novel	E. K. Weaver, The Less Than Epic Adventures of TJ & Amal	Jeremy Sorese, Curveball; Maggie Thrash, Honor Girl; Blue Delliquanti, O Human Star: Volume One; Ed Luce, Wuvable Oaf
LGBT Non-Fiction	Marcia M. Gallo, “No One Helped”: Kitty Genovese, New York City, and the Myth of Urban Apathy	Kay Whitlock and Michael Bronski, Considering Hate: Violence, Goodness, and Justice in American Culture and Politics; Corbett Joan O'Toole, Fading Scars: My Queer Disability History; Alice Dreger, Galileo’s Middle Finger: Heretics, Activists, and the Search for Justice in Science; Lillian Faderman, The Gay Revolution: The Story of the Struggle; Joshua Gamson, Modern Families: Stories of Extraordinary Journeys to Kinship; Robert Lorway, Namibia’s Rainbow Project; Jarrett Neal, What Color Is Your Hoodie? Essays on Black Gay Identity
LGBT Science Fiction/Fantasy/Horror	Kirsty Logan, The Gracekeepers	John Inman, The Boys on the Mountain; Fletcher DeLancey, The Caphenon (Chronicles of Alsea – Book #1); Ally Blue, Down; Robert Levy, The Glittering World; J. A. Rock, Minotaur; Kate Sherwood, Sacrati; Jude McLaughlin, Wonder City Stories
LGBT Studies	Hiram Pérez, A Taste for Brown Bodies: Gay Modernity and Cosmopolitan Desire	Clare Sears, Arresting Dress: Cross-Dressing, Law, and Fascination in Nineteenth-Century San Francisco; L. H. Stallings, Funk the Erotic: Transaesthetics and Black Sexual Cultures; Aaron Goodfellow, Gay Fathers, Their Children, and the Making of Kinship; Madhavi Menon, Indifference to Difference: On Queer Universalism; Jane Ward, Not Gay: Sex between Straight White Men; Petrus Liu, Queer Marxism in Two Chinas; Valerie Traub, Thinking Sex with the Early Moderns
Transgender Fiction	Roz Kaveney, Tiny Pieces of Skull, or a Lesson in Manners	Michael Scott Monje, Jr., Defiant; Sassafras Lowrey, Lost Boi
Transgender Non-Fiction	Willy Wilkinson, Born on the Edge of Race and Gender: A Voice for Cultural Competency	Amy Ellis Nutt, Becoming Nicole: The Transformation of an American Family; Zane Thimmesch-Gill, Hiding in Plain Sight
Transgender Poetry	kari edwards, succubus in my pocket	Ryka Aoki, Why Dust Shall Never Settle Upon This Soul; Joy Ladin, Impersonation
