= 29th Lambda Literary Awards =

2017 literary awards ceremony

The 29th Lambda Literary Awards were held on June 13, 2017, to honour works of LGBT literature published in 2016. The nominees were announced in March 14, and the winners announced at a gala ceremony on Monday evening, June 12, 2017 in New York City. Winners are in bold.

== Special awards ==
| Category | Winner |
|---|---|
| **Visionary Award** | Jacqueline Woodson |
| **Judith A. Markowitz Emerging Writer Award** | H. Melt, Victor Yates |
| **Trustee Award** | Jeanette Winterson |

== Nominees and winners ==
| Category | Winner | Nominated |
|---|---|---|
| Bisexual Fiction | **Alexis M. Smith, Marrow Island** | Leopoldine Core, When Watched; Martin Hyatt, Beautiful Gravity |
| Bisexual Non-Fiction | **Ana Castillo, Black Dove: Mamá, Mi’jo, and Me** | Elizabeth Hall, I Have Devoted My Life to the Clitoris; Maria Pallotta-Chiarolli and Sara Lubowitz, Women in Relationships With Bisexual Men: Bi Men By Women; Ann Tweedy, The Body’s Alphabet |
| Bisexual Poetry | **Abigail Child, Mouth to Mouth** | No advance shortlist was released in this category; the book was listed as a Bisexual Fiction nominee in the original nomination announcement, but singled out as a Bisexual Poetry winner at the ceremony. |
| Gay Fiction | **Rabih Alameddine, The Angel of History** | Jonathan Corcoran, The Rope Swing; Garth Greenwell, What Belongs to You; Matthew Griffin, Hide; Joe Okonkwo, Jazz Moon; Darryl Pinckney, Black Deutschland; Sarah Schulman, The Cosmopolitans; Sjón, Moonstone |
| Gay Memoir/Biography | **Cleve Jones, When We Rise** | Brian Blanchfield, Proxies; Augusten Burroughs, Lust & Wonder; Garrard Conley, Boy Erased: A Memoir; Joseph Osmundson, Capsid: A Love Song; Michael Schreiber, One Man Show: The Life and Art of Bernard Perlin; Will Schwalbe, Books For Living; Frederic Spotts, Cursed Legacy: The Tragic Life of Klaus Mann |
| Gay Mystery | **J. Aaron Sanders, Speakers of the Dead: A Walt Whitman Mystery** | L. A. Fields, Homo Superiors; Janice Law, Nights in Berlin; Dal Maclean, Bitter Legacy; Michael Nava, Lay Your Sleeping Head |
| Gay Poetry | **Phillip B. Williams, Thief in the Interior** | Derrick Austin, Trouble the Water; Bryan Borland, DIG; Sjohnna McCray, Rapture; Rajiv Mohabir, The Taxidermist’s Cut; Ocean Vuong, Night Sky with Exit Wounds; Aaron Smith, Primer; C. Dale Young, The Halo |
| Gay Romance | **Pene Henson, Into the Blue** | Richard Compson Sater, Rank; Jamie Deacon, Caught Inside; Alexis Hall, Pansies; Lisa Henry, Adulting 101; Garrett Leigh, Rented Heart; Jeff Mann, Country; Marshall Thornton, Femme |
| Lesbian Fiction | **Nicole Dennis-Benn, Here Comes the Sun** | Kathy Anderson, Bull & Other Stories; Lynda A. Archer, Tears in the Grass; Lucy Jane Bledsoe, A Thin Bright Line; M. B. Caschetta, Pretend I’m Your Friend; Lynn C. Miller, The Day After Death; Cathleen Schine, They May Not Mean To, But They Do; Jacqueline Woodson, Another Brooklyn |
| Lesbian Memoir/Biography | **Gloria Joseph, The Wind Is Spirit: The Life, Love and Legacy of Audre Lorde** | Ma-Nee Chacaby, A Two-Spirit Journey: The Autobiography of a Lesbian Ojibwa-Cree Elder; Christina Crosby, A Body, Undone: Living On After Great Pain; Tig Notaro, I‘m Just a Person; Joanne Passet, Indomitable: The Life of Barbara Grier |
| Lesbian Mystery | **Jessica L. Webb, Pathogen** | Lynn Ames, Final Cut; Andrea Bramhall, Collide-O-Scope; Jessie Chandler, Blood Money Murder; T. L. Hart, Walk-in; Cheryl A. Head, Bury Me When I’m Dead; Jennifer L. Jordan, Under Contract; Lee Winter, Requiem for Immortals |
| Lesbian Poetry | **Francine J. Harris, play dead** **Pat Parker (ed. Julie R. Enszer), Complete Works of Pat Parker** | Stephanie Adams-Santos, Swarm Queen’s Crown; Etel Adnan, Night; Donika Kelly, Bestiary; Stacy Szymaszek, Sinister Wisdom/A Midsummer Night’s Press Journal of Ugly Sites; Vi Khi Nao, The Old Philosopher; Arisa White, You’re the Most Beautiful Thing That Happened |
| Lesbian Romance | **Yoshiyuki Ly, The Scorpion's Empress** | Kiki Archer, Lost in the Starlight; Lila Bruce, Little Lies; Karma Kingsley, Finding Lizzie; Marianne K. Martin, The Liberators of Willow Run; Rachel Spangler, Perfect Pairing; Susan Wittig Albert, Loving Eleanor; Barbara Ann Wright, Coils |
| LGBTQ Anthology | **Zena Sharman, The Remedy: Queer and Trans Voices on Health and Health Care** | Lucian Childs and Martha Amore, Building Fires in the Snow: A Collection of Alaska LGBTQ Short Fiction and Poetry; David J. Getsy, Queer; E. Patrick Johnson, No Tea, No Shade: New Writings in Black Queer Studies; Jon Macy and Tara Madison Avery, ALPHABET: The LGBTQAIU Creators from Prism Comics |
| LGBTQ Children's/Young Adult | **M-E Girard, Girl Mans Up** | Jeff Garvin, Symptoms of Being Human; C. B. Lee, Not Your Sidekick; Marie Lu, The Midnight Star; Juliann Rich, Teen Gravity; Brie Spangler, Beast; Krystal Sutherland, Our Chemical Hearts; John Corey Whaley, Highly Illogical Behavior |
| LGBT Drama | **Robert O'Hara, Barbecue/Bootycandy** | Lois Fine, Freda and Jem’s Best of the Week; Topher Payne, Perfect Arrangement |
| LGBTQ Erotica | **Rebekah Weatherspoon, Soul to Keep** | Alexa Black, Steel and Promise; Scott Alexander Hess, Skyscraper; Meghan O'Brien, Camp Rewind; Marie Sexton and L. A. Witt, Roped In |
| LGBTQ Graphic Novel | **Ed Luce, Wuvable Oaf: Blood & Metal** | P. Kristen Enos and Heidi Ho, Active Voice The Comic Collection: The Real Life Adventures Of An Asian-American, Lesbian, Feminist, Activist And Her Friends; Éric Liberge and Arnaud Delalande (tr. David Homel), The Case of Alan Turing: The Extraordinary and Tragic Story of the Legendary Codebreaker |
| LGBTQ Non-Fiction | **David France, How to Survive a Plague: The Inside Story of How Citizens and Science Tamed AIDS** | Donald Albrecht, Stephen Vider and Skira Rizzoli, Gay Gotham: Art and Underground Culture in New York; Ariel Goldberg, The Estrangement Principle; David Greven, Ghost Faces: Hollywood and Post-Millennial Masculinity; Alexis Pauline Gumbs, Spill: Scenes of Black Feminist Fugitivity; Kristen Hogan, The Feminist Bookstore Movement: Lesbian Antiracism and Feminist Accountability; Sarah Schulman, Conflict Is Not Abuse: Overstating Harm, Community Responsibility and the Duty of Repair; Jurek Wajdowicz, Pride & Joy: Taking the Streets of New York City |
| LGBTQ Science Fiction/Fantasy/Horror | **Indra Das, The Devourers** | Michael Thomas Ford, Lily; Andrea Hairston, Will Do Magic for Small Change; Dayna Ingram, All Good Children; David Lennon, Irish Black; Sassafras Lowrey, A Little Queermas Carol; Ras Mashramani, Rasheedah Phillips, Alex Smith and M. Eighteen Téllez, Style of Attack Report; A. C. Wise, Kissing Booth Girl |
| LGBTQ Studies | **Jennifer Tyburczy, Sex Museums: The Politics and Performance of Display** | Qwo-Li Driskill, Asegi Stories: Cherokee Queer and Two Spirit Memory; Omar G. Encarnación, Out in the Periphery: Latin America’s Gay Rights Revolution; Jonathan Goldberg, Melodrama: An Aesthetics of Impossibility; Andrew Jolivette, Indian Blood: HIV and Colonial Trauma in San Francisco’s Two-Spirit Community; Kevin Mumford, Not Straight, Not White: Black Gay Men From The March on Washington to the AIDS Crisis; Timothy Stewart-Winter, Queer Clout: Chicago and the Rise of Gay Politics; Gregory Woods, Homintern: How Gay Culture Liberated the Modern World |
| Transgender Fiction | **Jia Qing Wilson-Yang, Small Beauty** | Kai Cheng Thom, Fierce Femmes and Notorious Liars: A Dangerous Trans Girl's Confabulous Memoir; Meredith Russo, If I Was Your Girl |
| Transgender Non-Fiction | **Lei Ming, Life Beyond My Body: A Transgender Journey to Manhood in China** | Chase Joynt and Mike Hoolboom, You Only Live Twice: Sex, Death and Transition; Morgan Mann Willis, Outside the XY: Black and Brown Queer Masculinity; Samuel Peterson, Trunky (Transgender Junky): A Memoir; Julia Serano, Outspoken: A Decade of Transgender Activism and Trans Feminism |
| Transgender Poetry | **Kokumo, Reacquainted with Life** | Cameron Awkward-Rich, Sympathetic Little Monster; Jos Charles, Safe Space; Jai Arun Ravine, The Romance of Siam: A Pocket Guide; Vivek Shraya, even this page is white |
