= Gary Jackson =

Gary Jackson may refer to:

- Gary Jackson (politician) (born 1950), American politician from Mississippi
- Gary Jackson (Brookside), a character from the British television series Brookside
- Gary Jackson (poet), American educator and poet
- Gary Jackson, a character from the comic book Knights of the Dinner Table
