= Okwudili Nebeolisa =

Nigerian poet

- Born: 1993 (age 32–33); Kaduna, Nigeria
- Education: Federal University of Technology, Minna (BEng); Iowa Writers' Workshop (MFA); University of Minnesota (MFA)
- Occupation: Poet
- Writing career
- Notable work: Terminal Maladies
- Notable awards: CAAPP Book Prize
- Website: Official website

Okwudili Nebeolisa (born 1993) is a Nigerian poet. His debut poetry collection, Terminal Maladies was a finalist for the Lambda Literary Award for Gay Poetry and the Hurston/Wright Legacy Award.

== Life and career ==
Nebeolisa was born in Kaduna, Nigeria. He earned an undergraduate degree in chemical engineering from the Federal University of Technology, Minna. He later graduated from the Iowa Writers' Workshop, where he won the Prairie Lights Prize for Fiction. He studied fiction at the University of Minnesota, where he was an MFA student.

His poems have appeared in Poetry, New England Review, The Sewanee Review, and other literary journals. His prose has appeared in Evergreen Review, The Georgia Review, and Catapult.

As of 2025, Nebeolisa was poetry editor of Post Road.

== Terminal Maladies ==
Nebeolisa's debut collection, Terminal Maladies, was published by Autumn House Press in 2024. The book won the 2023 CAAPP Book Prize. The collection was reviewed by Publishers Weekly, Shelf Awareness, and The Southeast Review.

== Bibliography ==
- Terminal Maladies. Pittsburgh: Autumn House Press, 2024. ISBN 978-1-637-68094-0.

== Awards and honors ==
- 2022: Granum Foundation Fellowship Prize, first runner-up
- 2023: Elizabeth George Foundation grant
- 2023: CAAPP Book Prize, for Terminal Maladies
- 2024: Center for the Arts Crested Butte writer-in-residence
- 2025: Lambda Literary Award for Gay Poetry, finalist, for Terminal Maladies
- 2025: Hurston/Wright Legacy Award, finalist, for Terminal Maladies
- 2026: Minnesota Book Award for poetry, finalist, for Terminal Maladies
