= Stephen Orgel =

American academic, author, and scholar

Stephen Orgel is Professor of English at Stanford University. Best known as a scholar of Shakespeare, Orgel writes primarily about the political and historical context of Renaissance literature.

Orgel received his B.A. from Columbia University in 1954 and his Ph.D. from Harvard University in 1959. He has taught at Stanford since 1985. He is a noted book collector. He is a major contributor to the body of literature on the Renaissance masque, particularly those of Ben Jonson.

== Selected critical works ==
- The Jonsonian Masque. Harvard University Press, 1965.
- Ben Jonson: The Complete Masques. Edited by Stephen Orgel. Yale University Press, 1969.
- The Illusion of Power. U California P, 1975.
- Impersonations:The Performance of Gender in Shakespeare's England. Cambridge, 1996.
- The Authentic Shakespeare. Routledge, 2002.
- Imagining Shakespeare. Palgrave, 2003.
- John Milton: The Major Works. Edited by Orgel and Jonathan Goldberg. Oxford, 1991.
