= Angelo Nikolopoulos =

American poet (born 1981)

- Born: September 24, 1981 (age 44); Los Angeles, California, U.S.
- Occupation: Writer
- Writing career
- Period: 2000s–present

Angelo Nikolopoulos (born September 24, 1981) is an American poet.

Nikolopoulos's first book of poems, Obscenely Yours, was published by Alice James Books in April 2013 and was a finalist for the 2014 Lambda Literary Award for Poetry. His second book of poetry, Pleasure, is forthcoming from Four Way Books.

His poems have appeared in The Best American Poetry (2012), Best New Poets (2011), Boston Review, Fence, Los Angeles Review of Books, New York Quarterly, Poetry Society of America, Tin House, TriQuarterly, and elsewhere.

== Biography ==
Nikolopoulos completed a BA at the University of California, Berkeley and an MA (Creative Writing and Literature) at New York University, where he studied with the poet Sharon Olds. He attributes the moment to become a poet when as a teenager finding in a San Francisco taxi a tattered copy of Olds's inaugural book of poetry, Satan Says.

He is the founder and host of The White Swallow Reading Series at the iconic Cornelia Street Cafe in Manhattan's Greenwich Village. Since 2013, the series has featured writers Christopher Bram, Michael Cunningham, Michael Dickman, Alex Dimitrov, Mark Doty, Marie Howe, A.M. Homes, Wayne Koestenbaum, Timothy Liu, Dorothea Lasky, Paul Legault, Susanna Moore, Eileen Myles, Brenda Shaughnessy, Gerald Stern, Justin Torres, Jean Valentine, Susan Wheeler, and Edmund White.

He teaches at New York University and Rutgers University, and is the Program Administrator for the Creative Writing Program at New York University, and lives in New York City.

== Works ==
=== Books ===
- Obscenely Yours. Alice James Books. April 2013.
- Pleasure. Four Way Books. Spring 2022.

=== Selected poems ===
- "Going Garbo" and "Hot Interracial, Hard Fuck, Big Black Cook". The Awl. October 2010.
- "Self Suck". Boston Review. May 2011.
- "Whispering Pines, Texas". Boxcar Poetry Review. May 2009.
- "Dress". The Collagist. January 2012.
- "After the Burial". Cortland Review. February 2012.
- "My Desire Has Made Me Radiantly Unspecial" The Journal. February 2012.
- "Daffodil". Lambda Literary. December 2010.
- "Female Trouble". Painted Bride Quarterly. April 2013.
- "Rear Stable: Auditions". Poetry Society of America. August 2013.
- "Boys Destroyed: Auditions". TriQuarterly. July 2013.

=== Poems in anthologies ===
- "Daffodil". Best American Poetry 2012. August 2012.
- "Daffodil". Best New Poets 2011. January 2012.
- "Going Garbo". Divining Divas. February 2012.
- "A Divine Spirit That Indwells in Nature and the Universe". Collective Brightness. May 2011.

== Awards and honors ==
- Jerome Foundation Travel and Study Grant, 2015.
- Lambda Literary Foundation Award Finalist for Poetry, 2014.
- MacDowell Colony Fellowship, 2013.
- Kinereth Gensler Award; Alice James Books, 2011.
- “Discovery”/Boston Review Prize for Poetry, 2011.
- Constance Saltonstall Foundation for the Arts Fellowship, 2010.
