= Matthew Griffin (writer) =

American writer

Matthew Griffin is an American writer. His debut novel Hide won the Crook's Corner Book Prize in 2017, and was a shortlisted nominee for the Lambda Literary Award for Gay Fiction at the 29th Lambda Literary Awards. It was also a Stonewall Honor Book in Literature.

Originally from Greensboro, North Carolina, he is currently a creative writing teacher at Tulane University. His husband, Raymie Wolfe, is a musician; the couple were profiled in a 2013 New York Times series on the struggle for LGBT rights in the Southern United States, as well as a follow-up piece about the changing landscape after the Obergefell v. Hodges decision that legalized same-sex marriage in the United States.
