= Reggie Harris (poet) =

American poet

Reginald M. Harris, Jr. (born 1960 in Annapolis, Maryland) is a poet and writer and winner of the 2012 Cave Canem/Northwestern University Poetry Prize.

== Biography ==
Reggie Harris was born in Annapolis, Maryland and raised in Baltimore. He attended Baltimore City Public Schools, graduated from Gilman School, and received a B.A. in Political Science from Randolph-Macon College. A Cave Canem Foundation Fellow, member of the National Book Critics Circle, and Board Member of the Publishing Triangle, he is currently a Lead Digital Navigator for the Brooklyn Public Library, in Brooklyn, New York.

From 1983-1987 he was a member of the United States Coast Guard, receiving a Commandant's Letter of Commendation Ribbon, Good Conduct Medal, Antarctic Service Medal and an honorable discharge. After working for Radio Shack/Tandy Corporation and Baltimore Magazine, he joined the Enoch Pratt Free Library in 1990. In 2001 he was named Head of the Information Technology Support Department, in charge of IT support and public computer training. He left Baltimore to become Poetry in the Branches Coordinator and Information Technology Director for Poets House in New York City in 2010 and became Director of Library and Outreach Services in 2015. Poets House suspended operations due to Covid-19 in December 2020.

== Creative Work ==
Reggie Harris's poetry, fiction, reviews and articles have appeared in numerous journals and websites, including African-American Review, BuzzFeed, Gay and Lesbian Review Worldwide, MELUS, North American Review, and the Gathering Ground: A Reader Celebrating Cave Canem’s First Decade, Of Poetry and Protest: Emmett Till to Trayvon Martin, and Voices Rising: Celebrating 20 Years of Black Lesbian, Gay, Bisexual and Transgender Writing anthologies. He helped compile and wrote the introduction to Carry the Word: A Bibliography of Black LGBTQ Books and contributed to Encyclopedia of Contemporary LGBTQ Literature of the United States and LGBTQ America Today: An Encyclopedia.

His fiction has appeared in the anthologies Best Black Gay Erotica, His3: Brilliant Fiction by Gay Male Writers, Intimacy: Erotic Stories of Love, Lust, and Marriage by Black Men, Making the Hook-Up: Edgy Sex with Soul, Men on Men 7: Best New Gay Fiction, The Spaces Between Us: Poetry, Prose and Art on HIV/AIDS, volumes One, Two and Four of the quartet of Brown Sugar collections of Erotic Black Fiction, and other venues. The short story “The Gift,” won the POZ Magazine/Artery Rage and Remembrance 2001 Literary Contest.

Harris's first book, 10 Tongues, was published in 2001 by Three Conditions Press. Focusing on issues of race, sexuality and family, it was a finalist for the Lambda Literary Award, and the ForeWord Book of the Year.

His second collection of poems, Autogeography, was published in 2013. Autogeography touches on the themes of race and sexuality in a variety of landscapes and locations, from Havana, Cuba to Baltimore. The book's manuscript was the winner of the 2012 Cave Canem Northwestern University Press Poetry Prize, subsequently renamed the Cave Canem Angela Jackson Prize.

His poem "Normal," which appears in Split This Rock's The Quarry: A Social Justice Poetry Database, was set to music by composer Brett Wery as part of Quarry Songs, a Song Cycle for Change in 2021.

Audio of Harris reading his poem "Training Camp" can be heard on the Poetry Foundation website.

Reginald Harris was interviewed by Kyle Dargan for Hill Center DC's "The Life of a Poet" series in October 2025.
