= Edgar Gomez =

American writer

- Born: Florida, United States
- Education: University of Central Florida (BA); University of California, Riverside (MFA)
- Notable awards: American Book Award (2023); Lambda Literary Award for Gay Memoir or Biography (2023)

Website
- edgargomez.net

Edgar Gomez is an American writer. He is best known for his debut memoir, High-Risk Homosexual (2022), which received a Lambda Literary Award and American Book Award. His second memoir, Alligator Tears, is a finalist for a Lambda Literary Award. His essay "Speaking My Language" is also included in Both/And: Essays by Trans and Gender-Nonconforming Writers of Color (2025).

Gomez was born in Florida "with roots in Nicaragua and Puerto Rico". He received a Bachelor of Arts in creative writing and TV production from the University of Central Florida, followed by a Master of Fine Arts in nonfiction creative writing from the University of California, Riverside. His work has been supported by the New York Foundation for the Arts, the Black Mountain Institute, and the National Endowment for the Arts (NEA). In 2024, he was an NEA fellow for prose.

Gomez uses all pronouns.

== High-Risk Homosexual (2022) ==
Gomez's debut memoir, High-Risk Homosexual: A Memoir, was published with Soft Skull Press on January 11, 2022. The essay collection explores how Gomez "learned to embrace and celebrate his identity as a gay Latinx man".

High-Risk Homosexual was well received by critics, including starred reviews from Kirkus Reviews and Publishers Weekly. Kirkus described the book as a "poignant, vivid, and often hilarious" work that "fearlessly explores intersectional identity and shows what it means to live and love authentically as a gay man today". According to Publishers Weekly, the book "transcends a simple coming-out story to instead offer a brilliant and provocative interrogation of sex, gender, race, and love".

Publishers Weekly and Electric Literature named High-Risk Homosexual one of the best nonfiction books of 2022. The following year, the book received an American Book Award, won the Lambda Literary Award for Gay Memoir or Biography, and was an honor book for the Israel Fishman Non-Fiction Award.

== Alligator Tears (2025) ==
Gomez's second memoir, Alligator Tears: A Memoir in Essays, was published with Crown Publishing on February 11, 2025. In the form of an essay collection, the memoir tracks Gomez's life from the perspective of an immigrant family attempting to achieve the American Dream, despite the hardships they experience. Meanwhile, Gomez discusses the jobs he held in bars, restaurants, and retail, as well as a stint in sex work, all while hoping to become a published writer.

Alligator Tears was well received by critics, including starred reviews from Kirkus Reviews and Publishers Weekly. According to Publishers Weekly, the collection is "funny, candid, and unfailingly stylish", even as Gomez "offers a pitiless, self-aware view of life on the margins".

Electric Literature named Alligator Tears one of the best nonfiction books of 2025. The book is also a finalist for the 2026 Lambda Literary Award for Gay Memoir or Biography.

== Awards and honors ==
Awards for Gomez's work
Year	Title	Award	Result	Ref.
2023	High-Risk Homosexual	American Book Award	Winner	
2023	High-Risk Homosexual	Israel Fishman Non-Fiction Award	Honor	
2023	High-Risk Homosexual	Lambda Literary Award for Gay Memoir or Biography	Winner	
2026	Alligator Tears	Lambda Literary Award for Gay Memoir or Biography	Finalist	
2026	Both/And	Lambda Literary Award for Transgender Nonfiction	Finalist	

== Publications ==
- High-Risk Homosexual: A Memoir. Soft Skull Press. 2022. ISBN 978-1-59376-705-1.
- Alligator Tears: A Memoir in Essays. Crown. 2025. ISBN 978-0-593-72854-3.
- Gomez, Edgar (2025). "Speaking My Language". In Norris, Denne Michele; Electric Literature (eds.). Both/And: Essays by Trans and Gender-Nonconforming Writers of Color. HarperCollins. ISBN 978-0-063-41437-2.
