= Wuvable Oaf =

Comic book series by Ed Luce

- cover of first collection

Publication information
- Publisher: Fantagraphics

Creative team
- Created by: Ed Luce

Wuvable Oaf is an indie comic book series by American artist and writer Ed Luce, under his Goteblüd Comics imprint. The central story follows the title character, Oaf Jadwiga, as he searches for love in a city that is never explicitly named, but is based on San Francisco. A number of subplots include Oaf's bizarre relationship with his cats (of which he owns dozens) and obsession with disco grindcore band Eja©uloid, whose lead singer Eiffel is Oaf's primary love interest. The comic also presents an extensive supporting cast of characters, many of whom have starred in their own spin-off stories and mini-comics.

Originally funded by a grant from Prism Comics, the series was self-published in five volumes. It was compiled in graphic novel form by Fantagraphics Books in 2015. A second volume titled Wuvable Oaf: Blood and Metal, focusing on Oaf's life prior to the story told in the original comics, was published in 2016.

== Bear subculture ==
Wuvable Oaf loosely depicts men who could be characterized as part of the gay "bear" subculture in that they are queer and of a large, hirsute body type. Luce has never denied this group is the primary inspiration for his creations but has noted in several interviews that the words "bear", "gay" and "queer" have never appeared in the comic itself. He states "It's pretty obvious to anyone who has cracked the book what's going on" and that labels only serve to alienate a potentially larger audience, who might enjoy reading an otherwise completely queer narrative. For this reason, the comic has also been referred to as "post-bear" and even "post-gay" for its lack of dependence on identity based rhetoric.

As a result, Wuvable Oaf has gained something of a crossover audience, being one of few queer indie comics to receive press outside the gay community. Whitney Matheson, writing for USA Today noted, "whether you're gay/straight/something in between, I think you'll find yourself rooting for the Oaf and his quest for somebody to wuv."

== Records and special editions ==
Several Wuvable Oaf comic releases have included 7" vinyl singles (usually with a picture disc B-side), credited to the fictitious band Eja©uloid, who are portrayed in the story. In reality, the recordings can be attributed to members of legendary Bay Area hardcore band Limp Wrist, as well as members of Talk is Poison. Martin Sorrondeguy is the voice of Eiffel, lead singer of Eja©uloid and Oaf's primary love interest.

Past songs have included "Fearce" and "Sleep Apnea", which feature a loud, abrasive thrashcore sound, along with spare keyboard lines and samples.

Other special edition items have included "Oafberry" flavored lollipops, various gig posters from the bands, temporary "stubble" tattoos, custom guitar pics and scratch & sniff cards portraying the various characters' personal scents.

Luce has stated that he considers his comics to be more like "art projects", which extend beyond the confines of the two-dimensional page.

== Awards ==
Luce garnered two Ignatz Award nominations for the series, in 2009 for Promising New Talent and in 2015 for Outstanding Artist, and was a shortlisted Lambda Literary Award nominee for LGBT Graphic Novel at the 28th Lambda Literary Awards for the original book and at the 29th Lambda Literary Awards for Blood and Metal. He won the award for Blood and Metal.
