= Andy Sinclair =

Canadian writer

- Born: Cowansville, Quebec, Canada
- Occupation: writer
- Writing career
- Genre: fiction
- Notable work: Breathing Lessons

Andy Sinclair is a Canadian writer, whose debut novel Breathing Lessons was a shortlisted nominee for the Lambda Literary Award for Gay Fiction at the 28th Lambda Literary Awards.

Sinclair was born in Cowansville, Quebec and raised in North Bay, Ontario, and is currently based in Toronto. Breathing Lessons was published by Véhicule Press in 2015.

He has also published short stories in fab, Plenitude, Dragnet and The Moose & Pussy.
