= Michael Lassell =

American writer and editor (born 1947)

- Born: July 15, 1947 (age 79); New York City, New York, USA
- Education: Colgate University (1969); Phi Beta Kappa (1969); California Institute of the Arts (1973); Yale School of Drama (1976)
- Occupations: writer, editor, poet
- Years active: 1980s–present
- Parent(s): Michael Joseph Lassell, Catherine Lassell

Michael Lassell (born July 15, 1947, in New York City) is an American writer, editor and poet, who is best known for his contributions to the fields of design, travel, arts, Broadway theater, and LGBT studies.

== Biography ==
=== Early life ===
Born on July 15, 1947, to Michael Joseph Lassell (1917–2006) and Catherine Lassell (1920–2015), Lassell grew up in Brooklyn, New York, later moving to New Hyde Park, New York when he was 3 years old.

=== Education and early career ===
Lassell graduated from Great Neck South High School in 1965. He then studied at Colgate University, earning his bachelor's degree in 1969, and graduated Phi Beta Kappa, cum laude, with a major in English in the same year. He later obtained a M.F.A. from the California Institute of the Arts in 1973 and a second one from the Yale School of Drama in 1976. Lassell returned to the California Institute of the Arts to become a teacher in the School of Theater and Division of Criticism Studies from 1976 to 1978.

=== Literary career ===
Lassell's literary output includes poetry, stories, essays and reviews, which have been featured in newspapers, magazines, books, journals and anthologies both in the U.S. and elsewhere. These works have been translated into French, Dutch, Spanish, German, Catalan, and Braille. His anthologized poem How to Watch Your Brother Die was written during the onset of the AIDS epidemic.

Lassell worked as managing editor of L.A. Style in the 1980s and of Interview in 1990, as a theater critic for the Los Angeles Herald Examiner and L.A. Weekly, and as the articles director of Metropolitan Home magazine from 1991 to 2009.

=== Personal life ===
Michael Lassell currently resides in Los Angeles, California, where he has lived since 1976.

== Bibliography ==
- The Lion King: Twenty Years on Broadway and Around the World (2017)
- Disney - Aladdin: A Whole New World: The Road to Broadway and Beyond (2017)
- Design 100: The Last Word on Modern Interiors (2010)
- Glamour: Making It Modern (2009)
- The Little Mermaid: From The Deep Blue Sea to the Great White Way (2009)
- Tarzan: The Broadway Adventure (2007)
- Mary Poppins: Anything Can Happen If You Let It (with Brian Sibley, 2007)
- Decorate: Insider's Tips From Top Interior Designers (2005)
- Celebration: The Story Of A Town (2004)
- Disney on Broadway (ed., 2002)
- Aida: Elton John & Tim Rice's AIDA: The Making Of The Broadway Musical (2000)
- The World in Us: Lesbian and Gay Poetry of the Next Wave (with Elena Georgiou, 2001)
- Certain Ecstasies (1999)
- Men Seeking Men (ed., 1998)
- A Flame for the Touch That Matters (1998)
- Two Hearts Desire: Gay Couples on Their Love (ed., with Lawrence Schimel, 1997)
- Eros in Boystown: Contemporary Gay Poems About Sex (ed., 1996)
- The Name of Love: Classic Gay Love Poems (ed., 1995)
- The Hard Way (1994)
- Decade Dance (1990)
- Poems for Lost and Un-Lost Boys (1985)

== Awards ==
- John Gassner Prize in Criticism (1976)
- Lambda Literary Award for Gay Poetry for Decade Dance (1990)
- Nomination: Lambda Literary Award for Poetry for A Flame for the Touch That Matters (1998), The World in Us: Lesbian and Gay Poetry of the Next Wave (2001)
- Society of American Travel Writers Foundation Lowell Award, Gold Medal for Our European Campaign (1999)
