= Lois Fine =

Canadian playwright

Lois Fine is a Canadian playwright. She is most noted for her play Freda and Jem's Best of the Week, which premiered at Buddies in Bad Times in 2014 and garnered a Lambda Literary Award nomination in the Drama category at the 29th Lambda Literary Awards in 2017.

The play, about a longtime lesbian couple's divorce, was inspired in part by the end of Fine's own relationship with Rachel Epstein. Prior to their separation, Fine and Epstein were involved in a Canadian Charter of Rights and Freedoms around the rights of non-biological parents.

Her other plays have included Dany's Gift and Body and Soul.

Fine is Jewish. Her daughter, Sadie Epstein-Fine, is also a playwright, noted for collaborating with Curtis te Brinke on the 2016 play Tire Swing.
