= Randall Mann =

American poet (born 1972)

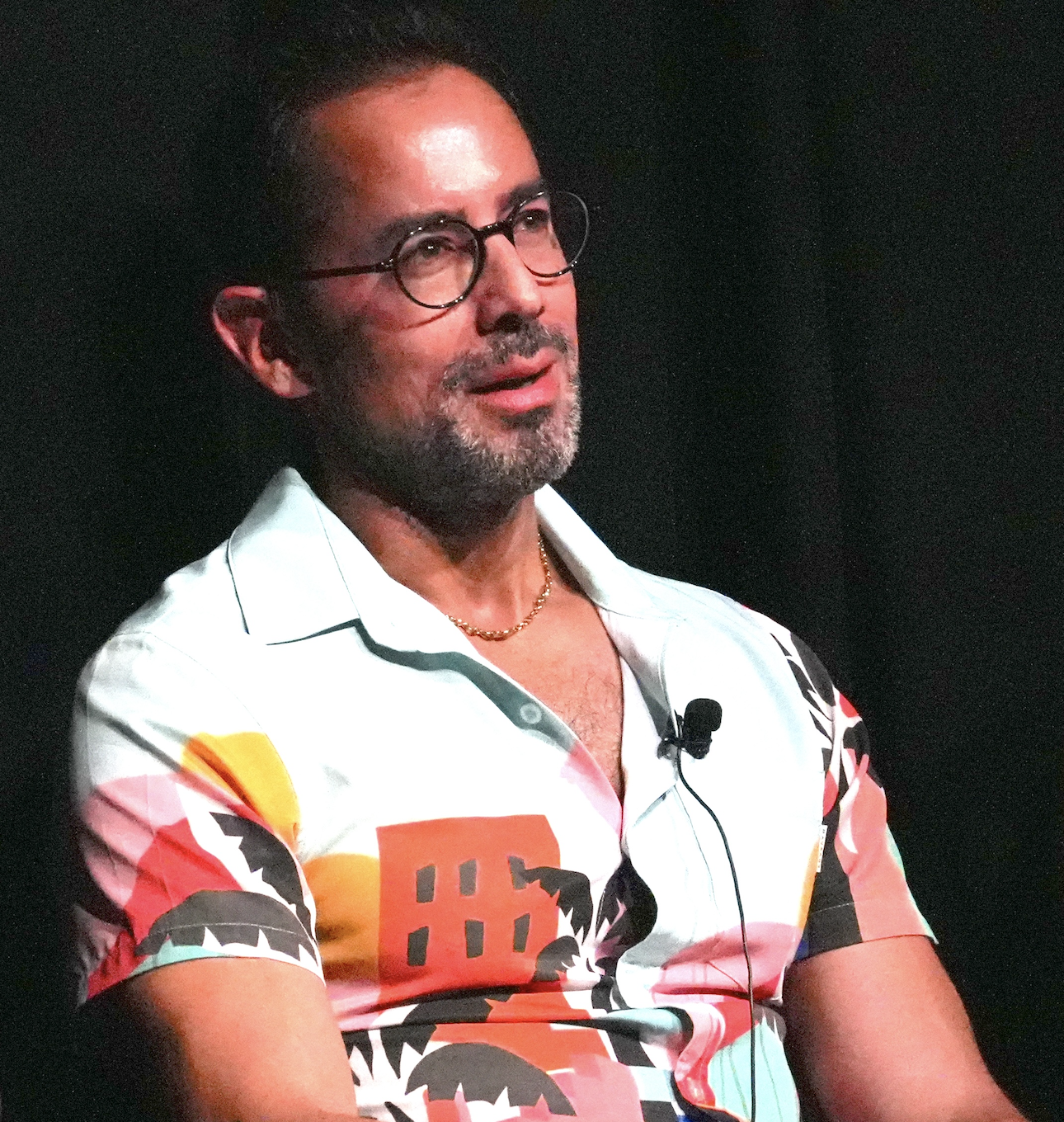
Randall Mann at Sierra Poetry Festival 2025

Randall Mann (born January 21, 1972) is an American poet.

== Life and career ==
Born in Provo, Utah, the only son of Olympic Track and Field medalist Ralph Mann, Mann grew up in Kentucky and Florida, and earned a BA and an MFA from the University of Florida. Since 1998, he has lived in San Francisco.

== Publications and critical reception ==
Mann's poems have appeared in numerous periodicals including The Kenyon Review, The New Republic, The Paris Review, Poetry, and The Washington Post, and he has published six full-length poetry collections. His first collection, Complaint in the Garden, published by Zoo Press in 2004, won the 2003 Kenyon Review Prize in Poetry. Mann's next collection, Breakfast with Thom Gunn, published by the University of Chicago Press in 2009, was praised by the Los Angeles Times: "craft and bravura mix well" and "the clarity startles". The book was named a finalist for the California Book Award and the Lambda Literary Award for Gay Poetry. Mann's next two collections were published by Persea Books. Straight Razor, published in 2013, was described by the Los Angeles Times as full of "breathtaking honesty", was named a best poetry book of the year by the Kansas City Star, and a finalist for the Lambda Literary Award. Proprietary, published in 2017, was a finalist for the 2018 Lambda Literary Award and the Northern California Book Award. In a review of Proprietary, Tess Taylor on NPR's All Things Considered said that "Mann imagines anew what it means to connect or to feel at a loss in the age of the Internet"; Nathan Blansett in The Kenyon Review wrote that "Proprietary shows Mann at his most incisive"; and Walter Holland, writing in Lambda Literary, wrote "Mann's work should be admired for its ferocity, its craft, and its unabashedly gay point of view."

Mann is also the co-author of the textbook Writing Poems, Seventh Edition, published by Pearson Longman in 2007.

== Honors and awards ==
In 2004, Mann was named to the OUT 100 list by Out magazine. He was named a Laureate of the San Francisco Public Library in 2010. In 2013, he received the J. Howard and Barbara M. J. Wood Prize from Poetry magazine.

== Published works ==
=== Poetry collections ===
- Deal: New and Selected Poems. Copper Canyon Press, 2023. ISBN 978-1556596766.
- A Better Life. Persea Books, 2021. ISBN 978-0892555314.
- Proprietary. Persea Books, 2017. ISBN 978-0892554812.
- Straight Razor. Persea Books, 2013. ISBN 978-0892554300.
- Breakfast with Thom Gunn. University of Chicago Press, 2009. ISBN 978-0226503448.
- Complaint in the Garden. Zoo Press, 2004. ISBN 978-1932023121.

=== Co-authored book ===
- Writing Poems, Seventh Edition. With Michelle Boisseau & Robert Wallace. Pearson Longman, 2007. ISBN 978-0321474063.
