= Cyrée Jarelle Johnson =

American poet, editor, librarian (born 1990)

- Born: March 1990 (age 36); United States
- Occupations: Poet, editor, librarian
- Spouse: Azure D Osborne-Lee
- Writing career
- Language: English
- Genre: Poetry
- Notable work: Slingshot (2019)
- Notable awards: 2020 Lambda Literary Award for Gay Poetry
- Website: cyreejarellejohnson.com

Cyrée Jarelle Johnson (born 1990) is an American poet, editor, and librarian. He co-founded the literary magazine Deaf Poets Society and is currently a librarian at Pratt Institute. His debut poetry collection Slingshot received a Lambda Literary Award for Gay Poetry.

== Early life and education ==
Johnson was raised in Piscataway, New Jersey, and grew up a household he described as "abusive".

He received his bachelor's degree from Hampshire College and completed his MFA in creative writing at Columbia University in 2019.

Johnson was diagnosed with autism when he was about four years old and with lupus in college. He stated in an interview for Mashable, "Autism scholarship characterizes folks on the spectrum as 'black and white thinkers' — and that's quite true for me. What I love, I love with verve and fervor. What I hate, I hate with verve and fervor."

== Career ==
Johnson is co-founder and poetry editor of Deaf Poets Society literary magazine, which was created in 2016 to specifically center works by writers with disabilities and those who are d/Deaf. The magazine was developed with accessibility in mind, such as providing works in various formats including text, audio, and images.

Johnson is an assistant professor and Diversity, Equity, and Inclusion Librarian at Pratt Institute. He is also a former Chapter Lead for Black Lives Matter Philadelphia.

He described his work as indirectly addressing disability and "what [he] had to do to stay alive." He published his debut poetry collection Slingshot in 2019 under Nightboat Books. In a New York Times review Stephanie Burt described the collection: "It’s challenging work, in its language, its stories, its subcultural references (“prince died for fem bois”), yet it offers pellucid queer intimacies."

== Personal life ==
Johnson is transmasculine and uses he/him pronouns. Johnson is gay. He is married to Azure D. Osborne-Lee and they reside in Brooklyn.

== Accolades ==
- 2020 - Lambda Literary Award for Gay Poetry (for Slingshot)
- 2020 - Ruth Lilly and Dorothy Sargent Rosenberg Poetry Fellowship, Poetry Foundation

== Works ==
- 2019. Slingshot. First edition paperback, publication date 17 September 2019, Nightboat Books. ISBN 9781643620091
