= Justin Phillip Reed =

American poet, novelist, and essayist

- Education: Washington University in St. Louis
- Writing career
- Language: English
- Years active: 2016–present
- Genre: Poetry
- Notable work: Indecency
- Notable awards: National Book Award for Poetry 2018
- Website: justinphillipreed.com

Justin Phillip Reed is an American poet, novelist, and essayist, best known for his National Book Award-winning debut poetry collection Indecency.

== Personal life ==
Reed lives in St. Louis, Missouri. His work often deals with what it means to be a queer black man in America. He went to Washington University in St. Louis.

== Books ==
He published a chapbook, A History of Flamboyance, with YesYes Books in 2016.

Reed's first full-length book of poetry, Indecency, deals with black identity and sexuality. It was published by Coffee House in 2018. Francine J. Harris, Nina Simone, Deftones, and Khadijah Queen were among the people who inspired Reed to write the book. Indecency won the National Book Award in Poetry in 2018.

== Bibliography ==
=== Books ===
- A History of Flamboyance (2016)
- Indecency (2018)
- The Malevolent Volume (2020)

=== Selected poetry ===
- BOAAT: "Every Cell in This Country…"
- Dreginald: "Quarantyne"
- Foundry: "When I Was a Man"
- Guernica: “The Hang-Up”
- Lambda Literary: "Minotaur"
- Nashville Review: "Beneficence"
- Paperbag: “The Telemachy” & 3 more
- PEN America: "The Bastard's Crown" & 1 more
- Poetry Foundation: “In a Daydream of Being the Big House Missus”
- Poets.org: "About the Bees"
- The Adroit Journal: "Exit Hex"
- The New York Times Magazine: "Theory for Expansion"
- The Offing: "When I Am the Reaper"
- The Shade Journal: "Head of Medusa"
- The Shallow Ends: "When What They Called Us Was Our Name"
- The Southeast Review: “Considering My Disallowance”
- Tupelo Quarterly: "South Carolina is / shaped like a heart […]"
- Vinyl: "|p|l|e|a|s|"
- wildness: "When I Had the Haint"
- Winter Tangerine Review: "Open Season"

=== Essays ===
- Black Warrior Review: "Villainy"
- Catapult: "Killing Like They Do in the Movies"
- Catapult: "Melancholia, Death Motion, and the Makings of Marilyn Manson"
- The Rumpus: "The Double Agency of Will Smith in Sci-Fi"

== Awards ==
- National Book Award for Poetry for Indecency (Coffee House Press, 2018)
- Lambda Literary Award for Gay Poetry for Indecency (Coffee House Press, 2018)
