= Jill Dolan =

American educator, author, blogger and feminist

- Born: Jill Susan Dolan; May 30, 1957 (age 67)
- Education: Boston University (BA); New York University (MA, PhD)

Jill Susan Dolan (born May 30, 1957) is an American educator, author, blogger and feminist. She writes on theatre, sexuality studies, and feminist theory. Since July 2015, Dolan has been the Dean of the College at Princeton University, where she is also the Annan Professor in English and a professor of theatre studies in the Lewis Center for the Arts. Prior to Princeton, Dolan served as the Department Head of Theater and Dance at the University of Texas at Austin, and as Professor at the University of Wisconsin-Madison. Dolan's notable works include her blog The Feminist Spectator, for which she received the 2011 George Jean Nathan Award for Dramatic Criticism, and Theater and Sexuality. Dolan also edited Menopausal Gentlemen: Plays and Performances of Peggy Shaw which won the Lambda Literary Award for Best LGBT Drama.

Dolan has received numerous accolades and achievements throughout her career as an educator. She received the William Kiekhofer Award for Excellence in Teaching from the University of Wisconsin–Madison, where she held a faculty position from 1988 to 1994. In 2006, Dolan was inducted into the University of Texas at Austin's Academy of Distinguished Teachers. In 2011, Dolan was awarded the Outstanding Teaching Award from the Association for Theater in Higher Education as well as a Lifetime Achievement Award from the Women and Theater Program.

Jill Dolan received her PhD in performance studies from New York University.

Dolan was elected as a member of the American Academy of Arts and Sciences in 2016.

== Notable work ==
Jill Dolan's blog, The Feminist Spectator (which launched in 2005) received the George Jean Nathan Award for Dramatic Criticism in 2012. Dolan was "only the seventh woman out of 56 winner's in the prize's history" (Fricker). While much of her blog consists of theatrical criticism, Dolan also regularly provides commentary on film and television. Dolan's blog frequently incorporates "issues of gender and sexuality (and difference, more broadly)" (Fricker).

Jill Dolan's Theater & Sexuality is part of Palgrave and Macmillan's Theater& series, a compilation of titles by various experts in the Theatrical discipline that seeks to analyze intersectional themes in theater for a wider audience. While Dolan receives criticism for limiting her explorations to an explicitly Western canon of theatrical literature (Sloan 323), she is praised for her ability to take the complexity of sexuality, identity, and LGBTQ subjects and facilitate them toward a broad audience without losing the nuances of each subject. Dolan formats her book with an introduction by Tim Miller, a historical overview of sexuality within the theory and practice of theater, the social constructionist frame of thought as defined by Michel Foucault and Judith Butler and finishes her work with a textual analysis of Belle Reprieve. Throughout, the book Dolan guides a general audience through the history of LGBTQ rights, performances, and practice through the theatrical medium.

Other works include: Wendy Wassertein (University of Michigan Press, 2017), Utopia in Performance: Finding Hope at the Theater (Michigan, 2005), and Presence and Desire: Essays on Gender, Sexuality, Performance (Michigan, 1994).
