= Nicholas Wong =

Hong Kong poet and translator

Nicholas Wong Yu Bon
- Born: Hong Kong
- Occupation: Poet and translator
- Education: City University of Hong Kong (MFA)
- Notable awards: Lambda Literary Award for Gay Poetry (2016)

Website
- nicholasybwong.weebly.com

Nicholas Wong Yu Bon (Chinese: 黃裕邦; pinyin: Huáng Yùbāng; born 3 February) is a Hong Kong poet and translator. He is the author of Cities of Sameness (2012), Crevasse (2015) and Besiege Me (2021).

== Early life and education ==
Wong was born on 3 February in Hong Kong, where he was also raised. He received a Master of Fine Arts from the City University of Hong Kong.

== Career ==
Wong has published three book-length poetry collections: Cities of Sameness (2012), Crevasse (2015), and Besiege Me (2021). In addition to poetry and translations, Wong founded Writing-Plus, an online creative writing pedagogy platform in Hong Kong. Wong also teaches with the University of Hong Kong Faculty of Education.

Wong's debut poetry collection, Cities of Sameness, was published with Desperanto in 2012. The poems in the collection "challenge ideals, assumptions and narratives about love, sexuality and human life, by urging the reader to observe and confront the politics of sameness and difference, particularly how they intersect in subjective perception and objective material reality". Michael Tsang, writing for Cha, referred to City of Sameness as "a debut not to be missed", noting that the "poems feature meticulous diction, effective line breaks and well balanced stanzas, all embellished with creative explorations of poetic acoustics and aesthetics".

Cities of Sameness was followed by Crevasse, which was published by Kaya Press in 2015. In the collection, "Wong writes of bodies and antibodies, of Hong Kong and the Queen of England, of sexual awakenings, of race, of desire, of what we might see and know through the body, of politics as well as the erotic, of mourning and loss." A The Kenyon Review writer highlighted recurring ideas, including the "notion of the interior world opening outward, as though on display", as well as the concept of "the crevasse created in the body by illnesses—societal, medical, emotional". Michael Tsang, writing for Cha, compared Crevasse to "statues of Greek gods, sculpted without a spare ounce of fat", noting that "Wong's works combine free verse with rigorously carved stanzas, often in couplets and triplets, meticulously versed". Comparing Crevasse to Cities of Sameness, Tsang noted that "Crevasse is slightly more conceptual [...] Cities is forceful, while Crevasse is enigmatic and lures readers to dive into its fissures. If Cities seethes, Crevasse bubbles." Crevasse won the 2016 Lambda Literary Award for Gay Poetry, with Carl Phillips's Reconnaissance.

Wong's his third poetry collection, Besiege Me, was published with Noemi Press in 2021. According to Publishers Weekly, "Wong's poems address queer and urban experience while also dissecting the political and economic factors that shape them, engaging with the history of Hong Kong, the speaker's often unspoken sexual orientation, and generational gaps". Publishers Weekly described Wong's style as "playful and linguistically inventive", noting that his "kaleidoscopic consideration of cities and desires [...] crackles with emotional energy". Besiege Me was a finalist for the 2022 Lambda Literary Award for Gay Poetry.

== Personal life ==
Wong is queer.

== Awards and honors ==
Awards for Wong's writing
Year	Title	Award	Result	Ref.
2016	Crevasse	Lambda Literary Award for Gay Poetry	Winner	
2018	"101 Taipei"	Peter Porter Poetry Prize	Winner	
2022	Besiege Me	Lambda Literary Award for Gay Poetry	Finalist	

== Books ==
- Cities of Sameness. Desperanto. 2012. ISBN 978-1-937-13113-5.
- Crevasse. Kaya Press. 2015. ISBN 978-1-885030-20-7.
- Besiege Me. Noemi Press. 2021. ISBN 978-1-93481-994-4.
