= Rickey Laurentiis =

American poet (born 1989)

- Born: 1989 (age 36–37); New Orleans, Louisiana, U.S.
- Education: Sarah Lawrence College (BA); Washington University in St. Louis (MFA)
- Occupation: Poet
- Writing career
- Notable works: Boy with Thorn; Death of the First Idea
- Notable awards: Cave Canem Poetry Prize (2014); Whiting Award (2018); Guggenheim Fellowship (2026)
- Website: rickeylaurentiis.com

Rickey Laurentiis (born 1989) is a trans American poet. They are the author of Boy with Thorn (2015) and Death of the First Idea (2025), which was longlisted for the National Book Award for Poetry. Laurentiis received a Whiting Award in 2018 and a Guggenheim Fellowship in 2026.

== Early life and education ==
Laurentiis was born in New Orleans, Louisiana, in 1989. They were raised in New Orleans. Laurentiis earned a BA in Liberal Arts from Sarah Lawrence College in 2011 and an MFA in Writing from Washington University in St. Louis in 2014.

== Career ==
Laurentiis's debut poetry collection, Boy with Thorn, was published by the University of Pittsburgh Press in 2015. Selected by Terrance Hayes for the 2014 Cave Canem Poetry Prize, the book also won the 2016 Levis Reading Prize. It was a finalist for the Kate Tufts Discovery Award, the Thom Gunn Award, and a Lambda Literary Award.

Laurentiis received a Whiting Award in poetry in 2018. Their other fellowships include a 2012 Ruth Lilly Fellowship from the Poetry Foundation, a 2013 Creative Writing Fellowship in Poetry from the National Endowment for the Arts, and fellowships from the Lannan Foundation and the Civitella Ranieri Foundation. Laurentiis was the inaugural fellow in creative writing at the University of Pittsburgh's Center for African American Poetry and Poetics.

Laurentiis's second collection, Death of the First Idea, was published by Alfred A. Knopf in 2025. The book was longlisted for the 2025 National Book Award for Poetry, and was a finalist for the 2025 National Book Critics Circle Award for Poetry and the Lambda Literary Award for Transgender Poetry. In 2026, Laurentiis was named a Guggenheim Fellow in poetry.

== Works ==
=== Poetry collections ===
- Boy with Thorn. University of Pittsburgh Press, 2015.
- Death of the First Idea. Alfred A. Knopf, 2025.

== Awards and honors ==
- 2012 Ruth Lilly Fellowship
- 2013 National Endowment for the Arts Creative Writing Fellowship in Poetry
- 2014 Cave Canem Poetry Prize for Boy with Thorn
- 2016 Levis Reading Prize for Boy with Thorn
- 2018 Whiting Award in poetry
- 2025 National Book Award for Poetry longlist for Death of the First Idea
- 2025 National Book Critics Circle Award for Poetry finalist for Death of the First Idea
- 2026 Lambda Literary Award for Transgender Poetry finalist for Death of the First Idea
- 2026 Guggenheim Fellowship
