= Aaron Smith (poet) =

American poet

- Education: University of Pittsburgh
- Occupations: Poet and academic

Aaron Smith is an American poet. Three of his poetry collections have been finalists for the Lambda Literary Award for Gay Poetry. His poetry often covers "what it means to be a gay man from a rural, working class environment."

== Education and career ==
Smith received a Master of Fine Arts from the University of Pittsburgh. He previously taught at West Virginia Wesleyan College and currently serves as an associate professor of Creative Writing at Lesley University. He has also been the recipient of fellowships from the New York Foundation for the Arts and the Mass Cultural Council.

== Awards ==
Awards for Smith's writing
Year	Title	Award/Honor	Result	Ref.
2003	What's Required	Frank O'Hara Award		
2004	Blue on Blue Ground	Agnes Lynch Starrett Prize	Winner	
2006	Blue on Blue Ground	Lambda Literary Award for Gay Poetry	Finalist	
2013	Appetite	Lambda Literary Award for Gay Poetry	Finalist	
2013	Appetite	Paterson Poetry Prize	Finalist	
2013	Appetite	Thom Gunn Award	Finalist	
2016	Primer	Poetry Must Read for the Massachusetts Center for the Book	Honor	
2017	Primer	Lambda Literary Award for Gay Poetry	Finalist	
2020	The Book of Daniel	Thom Gunn Award	Finalist	

== Publications ==
=== Poetry collections ===
- Blue on Blue Ground, Agnes Lynch Starrett Poetry Prize (University of Pittsburgh Press, 2005)
- Appetite (University of Pittsburgh Press, 2012)
- Primer (University of Pittsburgh Press, 2016)
- The Book of Daniel (University of Pittsburgh Press, 2019)
- Stop Lying (University of Pittsburgh Press, 2023)

=== Chapbooks ===
- Men in Groups: Chapbook (Winged City/New Sins Press 2011)
- What's Required

=== Poems ===
- “What It Feels Like to be Aaron Smith,” in The Best American Poetry 2013 (Scribner, 2013)
