= Center for African American Poetry and Poetics =

Poetry center at the University of Pittsburgh

- Abbreviation: CAAPP
- Formation: 2016
- Founders: Dawn Lundy Martin, Terrance Hayes, Yona Harvey
- Type: Poetry center
- Headquarters: Cathedral of Learning, Pittsburgh, Pennsylvania, U.S.
- Director: Gary Jackson
- Parent organization: University of Pittsburgh
- Website: www.caapp.pitt.edu

The Center for African American Poetry and Poetics (CAAPP) is a poetry center at the University of Pittsburgh devoted to African American and African diasporic poetry and poetics. Founded in 2016 by poets Dawn Lundy Martin, Terrance Hayes, and Yona Harvey, it presents public programs and archival projects centered on Black poetry and poetics.

== History ==
CAAPP emerged from a 2015 meeting convened by Don Bialostosky with Martin, Hayes, and Harvey. It launched in 2016 as a university-based center for the study, presentation, and archiving of African American and African diasporic poetry and poetics. One of its first public events was Poetry and Race in America, held in March 2016.

Early coverage described the center's plans for courses, residencies, fellowships, and archival work in addition to readings and discussions. Martin and Hayes were identified in early coverage as the center's co-directors. As of April 2026, poet Gary Jackson is CAAPP's director.

== Programs ==
CAAPP presents readings, conversations, workshops, performances, and other public programming related to African American and African diasporic poetry and poetics. It also works with the University of Pittsburgh Library System on archival projects, including recordings of its events, the CAAPP ULS Collection, the African American Poetics Online Archive, and the Cave Canem Oral History Project.

The center has operated a fellowship in creative writing. In 2021, Pittsburgh City Paper described the CAAPP fellowship as a two-year program intended to support Black artists' creative work.

In 2020, CAAPP and Autumn House Press established the annual CAAPP Book Prize, which awards publication and a cash prize to a first or second book by a writer of African descent.

CAAPP was also a partner in Lift Every Voice: Why African American Poetry Matters, a 2020–2021 public humanities initiative directed by Library of America.
