= Jedidiah Jenkins =

American travel writer

Jedidiah Jenkins is an American author and travel writer.

== Books ==
- Go Quiet on the Mountain: Stepping Away from a World That Never Stops (upcoming)
- Mother, Nature: A 5,000-Mile Journey to Discover if a Mother and Son Can Survive Their Differences (Convergent Books, 2023)
- Like Streams to the Ocean: Notes on Ego, Love, and the Things That Make Us Who We Are (Convergent Books, 2021)
- To Shake the Sleeping Self: A Journey from Oregon to Patagonia, and a Quest for a Life with No Regret (Convergent Books, 2018)
