= Omar G. Encarnación =

American political scientist

- Born: 1962 (age 63–64)

Academic background
- Education: University of Texas at Austin; Princeton University (PhD, 1997)

Academic work
- Discipline: Political science
- Institutions: Bard College

Omar G. Encarnación (born 1962) is an American political scientist. He is Charles Flint Kellogg Professor of Politics in the Division of Social Studies at Bard College in Annandale-on-Hudson, New York, where he teaches comparative politics and Latin American and Iberian studies. He has published numerous books and is a frequent contributor to The New York Times, Current History, Foreign Affairs, Time, World Policy Journal, The Nation, Foreign Policy, The Times Literary Supplement, and The New York Review of Books. He is the author of the forthcoming Framing Equality: The Politics of Gay Marriage Wars.

== Education ==
Encarnación received degrees from the University of Texas at Austin and from Princeton University, where he was the recipient of the Presidential Fellowship, graduating with a Ph.D. in politics in 1997. The title of his dissertation was "Governing Regime Change: Social Concertation in Democratic and Market Transitions."

== Scholarship ==
Encarnación is a prolific scholar who has written extensively about democratization in Spain, Latin America, and the United States. His first two books centered on Spain. He is also a scholar of LGBTQ politics, including same-sex marriage and the concept of gay reparations. His academic writing has appeared in Comparative Politics, Political Science Quarterly, Perspectives on Politics, West European Politics, Southern European Politics and Society, Comparative Political Studies, International Studies Quarterly, Journal of Democracy, Human Rights Quarterly, Ethics & International Affairs, and Latin American Research Review.

== Publications (Books) ==
- Spanish Politics: Democracy After Dictatorship. Polity Press, 2008. ISBN 0745639933
- Democracy without Justice in Spain: The Politics of Forgetting. University of Pennsylvania Press, 2014. ISBN 0812245687
- Out in the Periphery: Latin America’s Gay Rights Revolution. Oxford University Press, 2017. ISBN 0199356645
- The Case for Gay Reparations. Oxford University Press, 2021. ISBN 0197535666

== See also ==
- Human rights in Spain
- LGBT rights in the Americas
- Spanish transition to democracy
