= Ben Ladouceur =

Canadian writer (born 1987)

- Born: 1987 (age 38–39); Ottawa, Ontario, Canada
- Occupation: writer
- Writing career
- Genre: poetry
- Notable work: Otter

Ben Ladouceur (born 1987) is a Canadian writer, whose poetry collection Otter was a shortlisted nominee for the Lambda Literary Award for Gay Poetry at the 28th Lambda Literary Awards and won the Gerald Lampert Award in 2016.

Born and raised in Ottawa, Ontario, Ladouceur is currently based in Toronto. Prior to Otter, he published several poetry chapbooks, including Three Knit Hats (2007), Dust and the Colour Orange (2008), Nuuk (2008), Alert (2009), The Argossey (2009), self-portrait as the bottom of the sea at the beginning of time (2011), Lime Kiln Quay Road (2011), Mutt (2011), Impossibly Handsome (2013) and Poem About the Train (2014), and wrote the web series Other Men.

His work has been nominated for the Pushcart Prize, the John Newlove Poetry Award, the George Johnston Poetry Prize, and the John Lent Poetry Prize, and he was a winner of the Earle Birney Poetry Prize in 2013. In 2018, he was named a finalist for the Dayne Ogilvie Prize for Canadian LGBTQ writers, and won the award on June 16.

His most recent poetry book, Mad Long Emotion, was published in 2019.

His debut novel, I Remember Lights, was shortlisted for the 2026 Amazon Canada First Novel Award.
