= There Will Be No Miracles Here =

2018 memoir

- First edition
- Author: Casey Gerald
- Subject: Memoir
- Publisher: Riverhead Books
- Publication date: October 2018
- Pages: 400
- ISBN: 9780735214200

There Will Be No Miracles Here is a 2018 memoir by Casey Gerald. The book was named a Best Book of 2018 by NPR and the New York Times.
