= Derrick Austin =

American poet

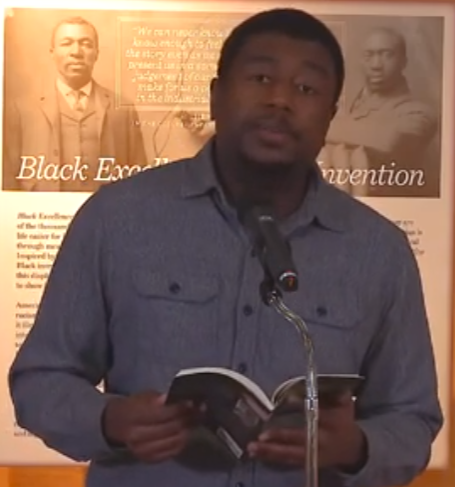
- Austin in 2022
- Born: Homestead, Florida, US
- Education: University of Tampa (BA); University of Michigan (MFA)
- Website: derricklynnaustin.wixsite.com/authorpage

Derrick Austin is an American poet. He is the author of Trouble the Water (2016), Tenderness (2021) and This Elegance (2026).

Derrick Austin was born in Homestead, Florida. He earned a Bachelor of Arts in English and creative writing from the University of Tampa, followed by a Master of Fine Arts in poetry from the University of Michigan. While there, Austin received the university's Hopwood Award in poetry. Austin has also been a Cave Canem fellow and Stegner Fellow, and received the Amy Lowell Poetry Travelling Scholarship, among other honors. Austin is gay.

== Select publications ==
=== Trouble the Water (2016) ===
Austin's debut poetry collection, Trouble the Water, was published with BOA Editions in 2016. The book explores Blackness, homosexuality, police brutality and other topics. Multiple poems juxtapose Black homosexuality and religious themes. According to American writer and book critic Rigoberto González of the Los Angeles Review of Books, this juxtaposition "asks a number of important questions about representations of beauty in art: whose bodies and what kinds of lives are valued, what languages are used to assert (and even influence) what is held sacrosanct in such hallowed spaces as palaces, churches, and museums".

Trouble the Water was well received by critics, including a starred review from Booklist. Rigoberto González referred to the collection as "a dense book, which could have been curated with more scrutiny in order to produce a leaner text", though noted that "the gravity of its insights and observations remain buoyed by Austin's confidence in dealing with the charged territories of religion and sex". Publishers Weekly similarly discussed how the collection manages a "fraught balancing act of being lighthearted, even convivial, in the face of worry and distress", adding that Austin" also deftly manipulates the tension between beauty and artlessness, sensitivity and violence". They concluded, "In Austin's hands, the exquisite can be ominous while the grotesque can turn charming, and his poems wisely assert that the world is unforgiving and yet full of mercy—that one can question beauty and yet still be beholden to it".

In 2016, American poet Mary Szybist selected Trouble the Water for the A. Poulin Jr. Prize. The following year, it was a finalist for the Kate Tufts Discovery Award, Thom Gunn Award, and Lambda Literary Award for Gay Poetry.

=== Tenderness (2021) ===
Austin's second poetry collection, Tenderness, was published through BOA in 2021, and "examines the fraught nature of intimacy in a nation poisoned by anti-Blackness and homophobia, uplifting sites of resistance and healing, including art, friendship and erotic love".

Tenderness won the 2021 Isabella Gardener Award and was a finalist for the Lambda Literary Award for Gay Poetry.

=== This Elegance (2026) ===
Austin's third poetry collection, This Elegance, was published by BOA in 2026. Prior to publication, LitHub named it among the year's most anticipated poetry collections.

== Books ==
- Trouble the Water. Boa Editions. 2016. ISBN 978-1-942683-04-9.
- Tenderness. Boa Editions. 2021. ISBN 978-1-950774-39-5.
- Black Sand. Foundling Press. 2022.
- This Elegance. Boa Editions. 2026. ISBN 978-1-960145-94-9.
