= Mark Wunderlich =

American poet (born 1968)

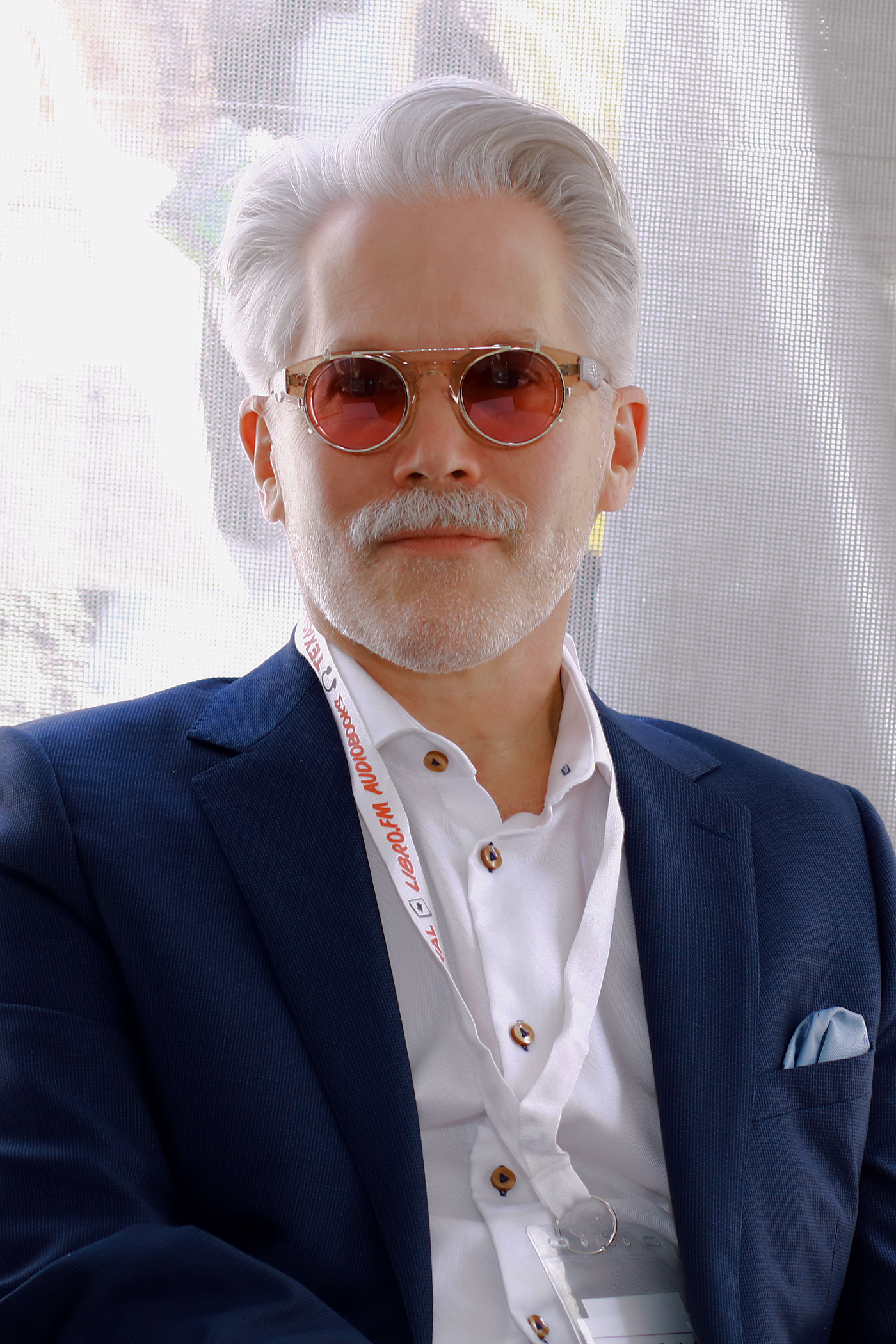
- Wunderlich at the 2024 Texas Book Festival
- Born: 1968 (age 57–58); Winona, Minnesota, U.S.
- Occupation: Poet

Academic background
- Education: Columbia University School of the Arts; University of Wisconsin–Madison College of Letters and Science

Mark Wunderlich (/ˈwʌndərlɪk/ WUN-dər-lik; born 1968), is an American poet. He was born in Winona, Minnesota, and grew up in a rural setting near the town of Fountain City, Wisconsin. He attended Concordia College's Institute for German Studies before transferring to the University of Wisconsin, where he studied English and German literature. After moving to New York City he attended Columbia University, where he received an MFA (Master of Fine Arts) degree.

Wunderlich has published four collections of poetry, most recently God of Nothingness (Graywolf Press, 2021). He worked on his first book, The Anchorage, (University of Massachusetts Press, 1999) as his MFA thesis at Columbia University and finished it while living in Provincetown, Massachusetts. There he was friends with the poet Stanley Kunitz (1905–2006). A second book of poems, Voluntary Servitude, was published by Graywolf Press in 2004.

== Life ==
Wunderlich has published individual poems, essays, reviews and interviews in the Paris Review, Yale Review, Slate, Fence, Boston Review, Chicago Review, and AGNI. Wunderlich has taught at Stanford, San Francisco State University, Ohio University, Barnard College, and Columbia University. Since 2004, he has been a member of the literature faculty at Bennington College in Vermont, where he is also Director of the Graduate Writing Seminars. He lives in New York's Hudson River Valley near the town of Catskill.

== Bibliography ==
=== Poetry ===
Collections

- Wunderlich, Mark (1999). The anchorage. University of Massachusetts Press.
- — (2004). Voluntary servitude. Graywolf Press.
- — (2014). The Earth avails. Graywolf Press.
- — (2021). God of Nothingness. Graywolf Press.

List of poems

Title	Year	First published	Reprinted/collected
The bats	2020	Wunderlich, Mark (December 21, 2020). "The bats". The New Yorker. 96 (41): 47.	

== Honors and awards ==
- Lambda Literary Award for The Anchorage (1999)
- two fellowships from the Fine Arts Work Center in Provincetown
- Wallace Stegner Fellowship from Stanford University
- Writers at Work Award
- Jack Kerouac Prize
- Poetry Fellowship from the National Endowment for the Arts
- Poetry Fellowship from the Massachusetts Cultural Council
- Fellowship from the Amy Lowell Trust
- Editor's Prize from the Missouri Review, 2012
- 2015 Rilke Prize from the University of North Texas for The Earth Avails
- 2017 James Merrill House Fellow

== Reviews ==
Poetry magazine wrote,

Mark Wunderlich's first book, The Anchorage, is a vigorous, necessary attempt to make our words catch up with our changing world: 'This is America--beetles clustered with the harvest, dust roads trundling off at perfect angles, and signs proclaiming unbearable roadside attractions.' The poems are extravagantly -- perhaps I should say fiercely -- autobiographical.
