= Ed Luce =

American cartoonist

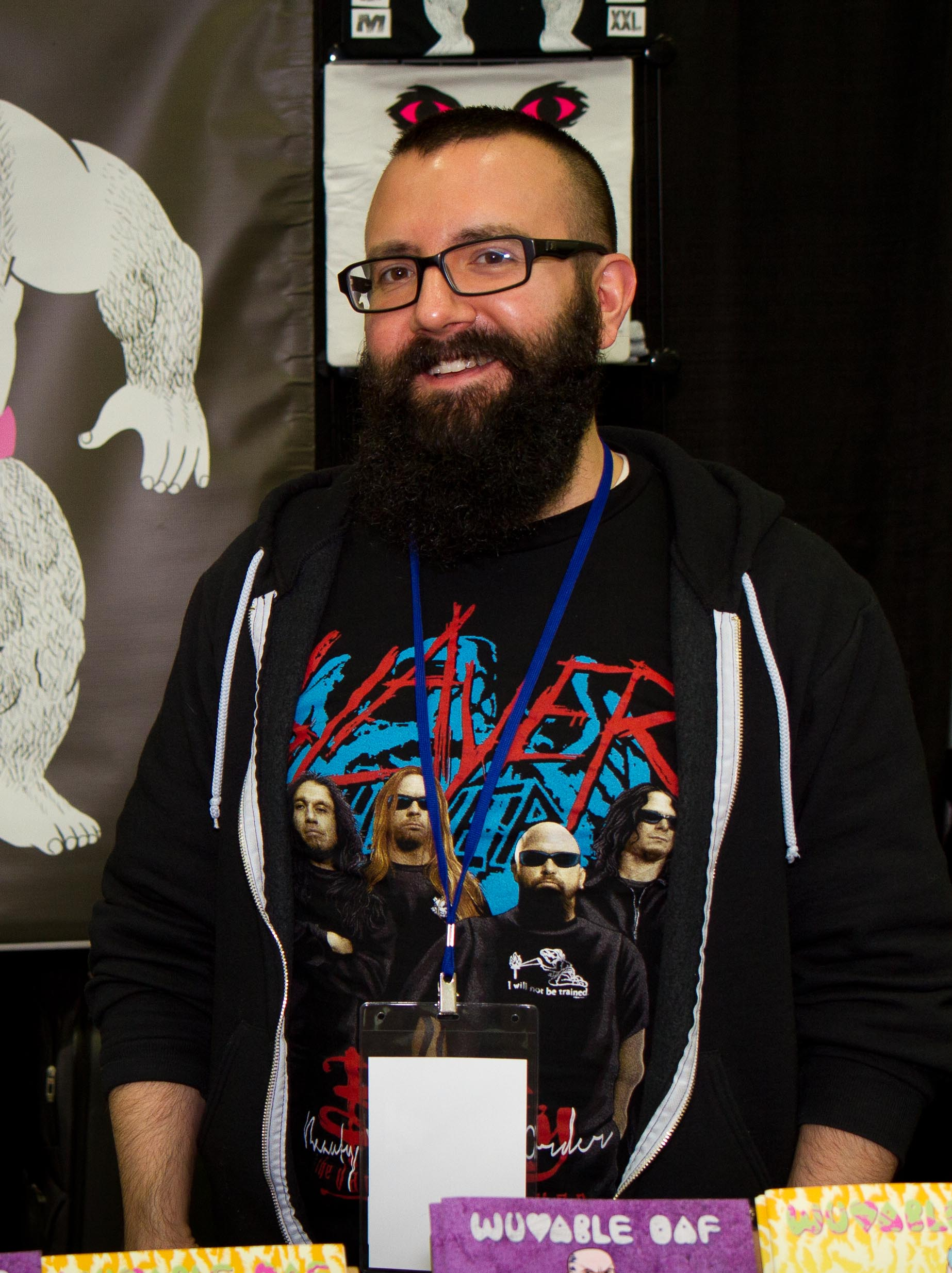
- Luce at the 2012 Stumptown Comics Fest
- Area: Cartoonist
- Notable works: Wuvable Oaf

Ed Luce is an American cartoonist, best known for his indie comics series Wuvable Oaf. The series focuses on Oaf Jadwiga, a bearish gay ex-wrestler looking for love. Originally funded by a grant from Prism Comics, it was self-published in five standalone chapters until being compiled in graphic novel form by Fantagraphics Books in 2015.

He is a two-time Ignatz Award nominee for the series, garnering nominations in 2009 for Promising New Talent and in 2015 for Outstanding Artist, and was a 2016 Lambda Literary Award nominee for LGBT Graphic Novel. A second volume, Wuvable Oaf: Blood and Metal, was published in 2016 and won the Award for LGBT Graphic Novel at the 29th Lambda Literary Awards.

Luce lives with his husband Mark in San Francisco, where he teaches at California College of the Arts.
