= Michael Klein (writer) =

American writer, poet, and academic (born 1954)

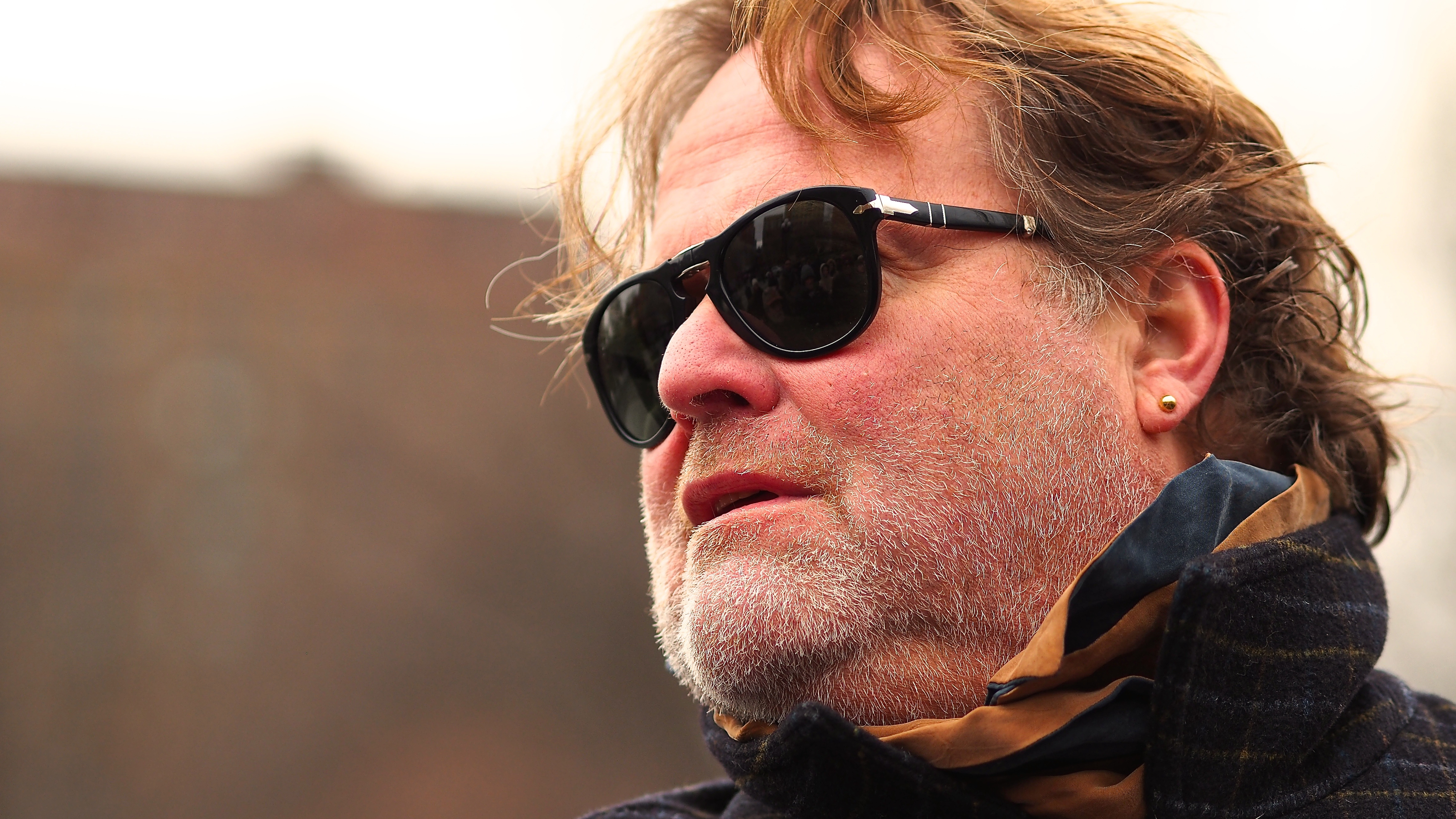
- Michael Klein attends a rally at Washington Square, New York, in December 2014
- Born: Washington, DC
- Education: Bennington College
- Occupations: Poet, professor
- Spouse: Andrew Hood
- Writing career
- Period: 1993–present
- Genre: Poetry
- Notable awards: Lambda Literary Award
- Website: www.hauntedimportantly.com

Michael Klein (born August 17, 1954) is an American Lambda literary award-winning fiction writer, poet, and faculty member of the English department at Goddard College and The Frost Place Conference on Poetry.

== Life ==
Klein was born in Washington, DC and attended Bennington College as an undergraduate, later receiving his MFA from Vermont College. He resides in New York City, where he has lived since the age of two. Klein attended PS 41 in the West Village, and New Lincoln School on the Upper West Side for Junior High School, and finished at New York City's Music and Art High School where he studied voice.

Among his mentors was Adrienne Rich, attending poetry workshops with a select few other teenagers. Not only an important influence on his love of poetry and writing, she became a lifelong friend with whom he would share time whenever she came to New York for a reading engagement or to visit her home city.

Klein was a fellow at the Provincetown Fine Arts Work Center from 1990 to 1991, where he finished his first memoir, Track Conditions, about his life on the race track where he was a groom to the Kentucky Derby Winning horse Swale and his subsequent life of sobriety.

=== Poetry ===
Klein has published three books of poetry, two books of non-fiction as well as literary criticism and interviews with other notable authors. He is currently publishing, albeit not exclusively, under Sibling Rivalry Press.

== Educator ==
Klein serves as a member of the writing faculty at Goddard College. He teaches courses to humanities students in the memoir, essay, fiction and poetry concentrations. He has also featured interviews with writers like the poet Adrienne Rich and the playwright Eve Ensler.

=== Bibliography ===
Books

- A Life in the Theater (Sibling Rivalry Press, 2015)
- The Talking Day (Sibling Rivalry Press, 2013)
- States of Independence (chapbook, BLOOM Books, 2013)
- then, we were still living (GenPop Books, 2010)
- The End of Being Known, a Memoir (University of Wisconsin Press, 2003)
- Track Conditions, a Memoir (Persea Books, 1997)
- Things Shaped in Passing: More 'Poets for Life' Writing from the AIDS Pandemic (Persea Books, 1997)
- In the Company of My Solitude: American Writing from the AIDS Pandemic (Editor with Marie Howe) (Persea Books, 1995)
- 1990, Poems (Provincetown Arts Press, 1993)

Essays

- “Risk Delight: Happiness and the ‘I’ at the End of the World”, Poetry Magazine, April, 2014
- “And If That Doesn’t Work, Talk About God”, Ocean State Review, 2012
- “Women Who Write the World” Provincetown Arts, 2001
- “Playing By Ear”, Poets & Writers, 2000
