= Bernard Cooper =

American novelist and short story writer

- Born: October 3, 1951 (age 74); Los Angeles, California, U.S.
- Education: California Institute of the Arts (MFA)
- Occupations: Novelist; essayist; short story writer
- Parent(s): Edward Cooper; Lillian Cooper
- Writing career
- Notable awards: PEN/Hemingway Award for Debut Novel (1991)
- Website: www.bernardcooper.net

Bernard Cooper (born October 3, 1951) is an American novelist, essayist and short story writer. His writings are in part autobiographical and influenced by his own experiences as a gay man. His work has appeared in numerous magazines, journals, and five volumes of The Best American Essays. Two of Cooper's novels have received literary awards. He is often described as a "writer's writer". Cooper has taught at the California Institute of the Arts and Bennington College, and in 2014 he served as the Bedell Distinguished Visiting professor at the University of Iowa's nonfiction writing program.

== Biography, education and work ==
Cooper was born in Hollywood, California, to Jewish parents; Lillian and Edward Cooper. He was the youngest of his parents' four boys, and was raised in Los Angeles. His three older brothers all died from either cancer or heart attack, when they were in their 30s. His father was a prosperous divorce attorney in Los Angeles, and his mother was a "stay-at-home-mom". In an interview with The Los Angeles Times, Cooper stated that while growing up, he didn't speak that much to his father, and when they did, "it wasn't for long". When Cooper was 28 years old, he received an itemized bill, written by his father, in the form of an official document, outlining the costs associated with raising him, with a mandate for a $2 million repayment, as told in his book, The Bill From My Father.

Cooper graduated from the California Institute of the Arts in 1979, with a Master of Fine Arts degree. After graduation, he turned his back on the visual arts degree, and pursued writing instead. One of his first jobs was working as a shoe salesman. He was a teacher at the UCLA Extension Writers' Program at Antioch University Los Angeles. Additionally, he has taught at the California Institute of the Arts, Bennington College, and at Otis College of Art and Design. Cooper was also employed as an art critic for Los Angeles Magazine. In 2009, Cooper held the 'Mary Routt Chair of Writing' at Scripps College, where he taught for a semester.

== Awards and fellowships ==
His awards and fellowships include the Hemingway Foundation/PEN Award for Maps to Anywhere, the O. Henry Award for Truth Serum, and has also received a Guggenheim Fellowship, and a fellowship from the National Endowment for the Arts.

== Works ==
- (1990) Maps To Anywhere. Penguin Books. 1990.
- (1991) A Clack of Tiny Sparks: Remembrances of a Gay Boyhood
- (1993) A Year of Rhymes. Viking. 1993. ISBN 978-0-670-84732-7.
- (1996) Truth Serum. Houghton Mifflin Co. 1996. ISBN 978-0-395-74539-7.
- (2000) Guess again. Simon & Schuster. 2000. ISBN 978-0-684-86586-7.
- (2006) The Bill From My Father: A Memoir. Simon & Schuster. 2006. ISBN 978-0-7432-4962-1.
- (2015) My Avant-Garde Education: A Memoir. W.W. Norton & Company. 2015. ISBN 978-0-393-24071-9.

== The Best American Essays ==
- (1988) The Best American Essays. Ticknor & Fields. 1988. ISBN 978-0-89919-730-2.
- (1995) The Best American Essays. Houghton Mifflin. 1995. ISBN 978-0-395-69183-0.
- (1997) The Best American Essays. Houghton Mifflin. 1997. ISBN 978-0-395-85695-6.
- (2002) The Best American Essays. Houghton Mifflin. 2002. ISBN 978-0-618-21388-7.
- (2008) The Best American Essays. Houghton Mifflin. 2008. ISBN 978-0-618-98331-5.

== Selected journal articles ==
- (1987) Cooper, Bernard (1987). "Beacons Burning Down". The Georgia Review. 41 (2): 249–257. ISSN 0016-8386. JSTOR 41399283.
- (1988) Cooper, Bernard (1988). "Utopia". Grand Street. 8 (1): 47–49. doi:10.2307/25007166. ISSN 0734-5496. JSTOR 25007166.
- (1989) Cooper, Bernard (1989). "The House of the Future". Grand Street. 8 (3): 73–104. doi:10.2307/25007236. ISSN 0734-5496. JSTOR 25007236.
- (1990) Cooper, Bernard (1990). "Dreaming Aloud". The Kenyon Review. 12 (2): 55–57. ISSN 0163-075X. JSTOR 4336225.
- (1999) Cooper, Bernard (1999). "Hunters and Gatherers". Ploughshares. 25 (1): 25–49. ISSN 0048-4474. JSTOR 40352568.
- (2000) Cooper, Bernard (2000). "Bit-O-Honey". The Threepenny Review (80): 23–25. ISSN 0275-1410. JSTOR 4384905.
- (2001) Cooper, Bernard (2001). "How to Draw". The Georgia Review. 55/56: 184–186. ISSN 0016-8386. JSTOR 41402131.
