= Paul Legault =

Canadian-American poet (born 1985)

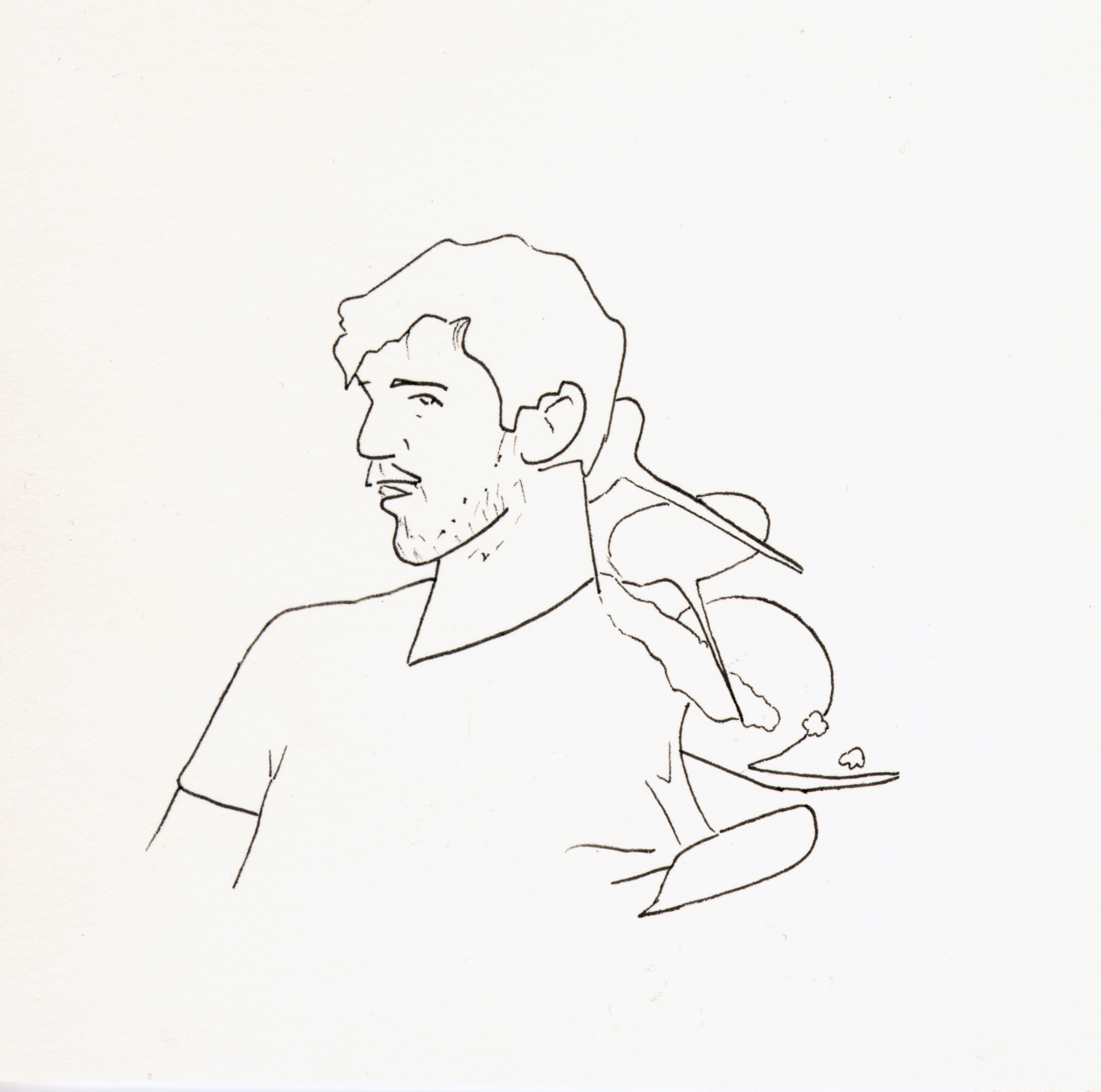
- line drawing of Paul Legault
- Born: June 25, 1985 (age 41); Ottawa, Ontario, Canada
- Education: University of Virginia (MFA); University of Southern California (BFA)
- Occupations: Writer, translator, publisher
- Employer: Washington University in St. Louis

Paul Legault (/ləˈɡoʊ/ lə-GOH; born June 25, 1985) is a Canadian-American poet.

== Life ==
Legault was born in Ottawa, Ontario, and raised in Tennessee. He graduated from the University of Southern California, where he obtained a BFA in screenwriting, and the University of Virginia, where he earned an MFA in creative writing.

He is a co-founder of the translation press Telephone Books. Since 2010, his output has taken on characteristics similar to Kenneth Koch works such as One Thousand Avant-Garde Plays, with absurdist miniature dialogues between animate, inanimate, or abstract characters. In 2012, he released terse English-to-English translations of Emily Dickinson's poetry.

His writing has been published in The Awl, Boston Review, Denver Quarterly, Field, The Literati Quarterly, Pleiades and other journals.

From 2013 to 2015, he lived in St. Louis, Missouri, serving as a writer-in-residence in Arts and Sciences at Washington University in St. Louis. Currently, he lives in New York City.

== Bibliography ==
=== Collections ===
- The Tower (Coach House Books, 2020). OCLC 1132264315
- Lunch Poems 2 (Spork, 2018). OCLC 1040263726
- Self-Portrait in a Convex Mirror 2 (Fence, 2016). OCLC 908071998
- The Emily Dickinson Reader: An English-to-English Translation of the Complete Poems of Emily Dickinson (McSweeney's, 2012). OCLC 773669701
- The Other Poems (Fence, 2011). OCLC 759935382
- The Madeleine Poems (Omnidawn, 2010). OCLC 838378158

=== Edited anthology ===
- The Sonnets: Translating and Rewriting Shakespeare (Nightboat/Telephone, 2012). OCLC 785870535
