= Timothy Liu =

American poet and author

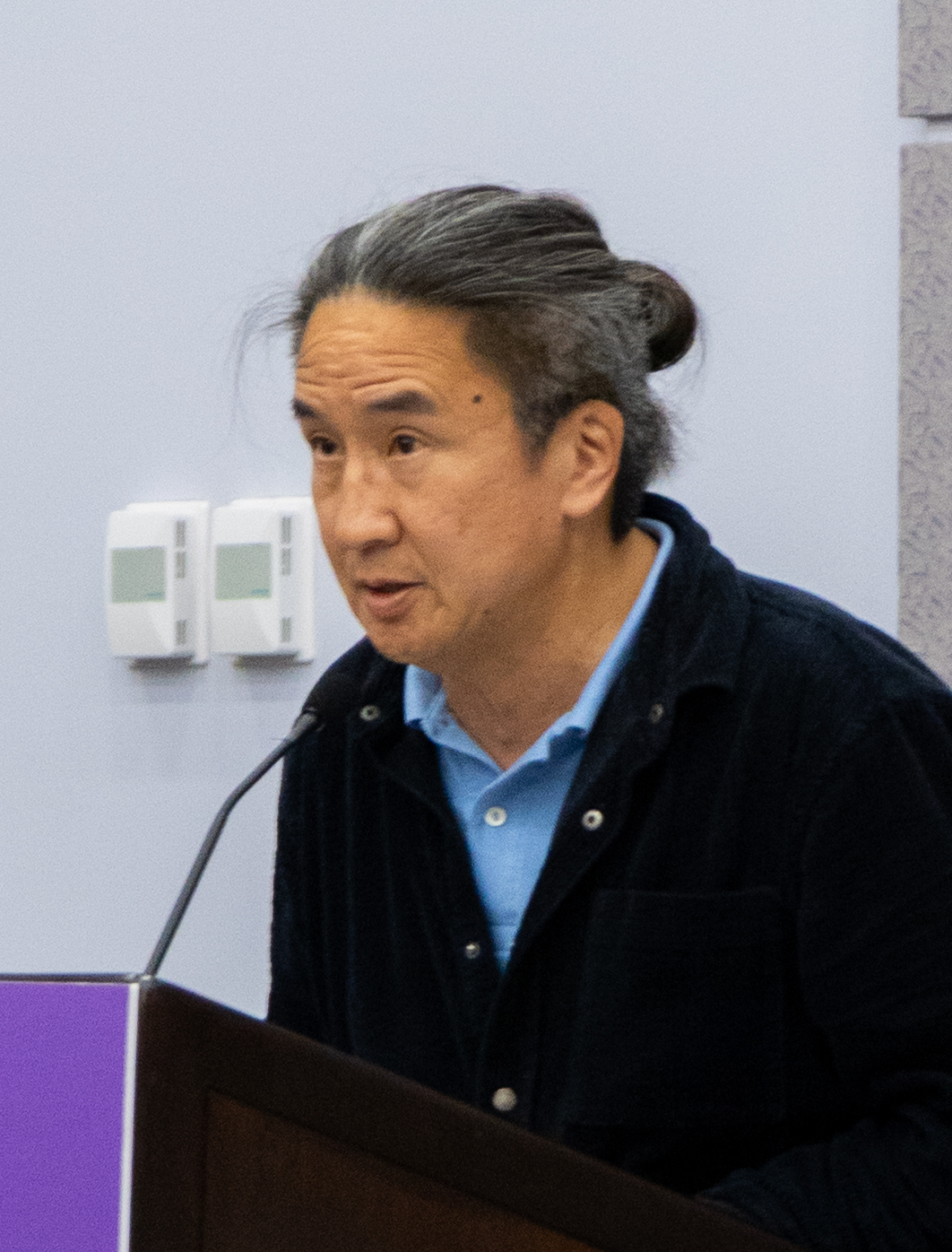
- Liu at AWP 2025
- Born: 1965 (age 60–61)
- Education: Brigham Young University (BA); University of Houston (MA)

Timothy Liu (born 1965 in San Jose, California) is an American poet and the author of such books as Bending the Mind Around the Dream's Blown Fuse, For Dust Thou Art, Of Thee I Sing, Hard Evidence, Say Goodnight, Burnt Offerings and Vox Angelica. He is also the editor of Word of Mouth: An Anthology of Gay American Poetry.

Liu received his B.A. in English (1989) from Brigham Young University and his M.A. in Poetry (1991) from the University of Houston; he also studied at the University of California, Los Angeles and the University of Massachusetts, Amherst where he met his husband, the artist Christopher Arabadjis. Liu was a Professor of English at William Paterson University until he took early retirement in January 2022. He currently teaches at SUNY New Paltz and Vassar College. He has also taught at Hampshire College, Cornell College, University of California Berkeley, University of North Carolina Wilmington, University of Michigan, Tulane University, and in the Graduate Writing Seminars at Bennington College. His journals and papers are archived in the Berg Collection at the New York Public Library.

== Works ==
- Vox Angelica (Alice James Books, 1992; Norma Farber First Book Award from the Poetry Society of America)
- Burnt Offerings (Copper Canyon Press, 1995)
- Say Goodnight (Copper Canyon Press, 1998; PEN/Beyond Margins Award)
- Hard Evidence (Talisman House, 2001)
- Of Thee I Sing (University of Georgia Press, 2004; Poetry Book-of-the-Year Award from Publishers Weekly)
- For Dust Thou Art (Southern Illinois University Press, 2005)
- Bending the Mind Around the Dream's Blown Fuse (Talisman House, 2009)
- Polytheogamy (Saturnalia Books, 2009)
- Don't Go Back To Sleep (Saturnalia Books, 2014)
- Kingdom Come: A Fantasia (Talisman House, 2017)
- Luminous Debris: New & Selected Legerdemain 1992-2017 (Barrow Street Books, 2018)
- Let It Ride (Saturnalia Books, 2019)
- Down Low and Lowdown: Bedside Bottom-Feeder Blues (Barrow Street Books, 2023)

As editor

- Word of Mouth: An Anthology of Gay American Poetry (Talisman House, 2000)

Included in

- Harvest: Contemporary Mormon Poems (Signature, 1989)
- 2002 Best American Poetry (Scribners, 2002)
- 2011 Pushcart Prize (Pushcart, 2011)
- Fire in the Pasture: 21st Century Mormon Poets (Peculiar Pages, 2011)
