= Kenny Fries =

American memoirist and poet (born 1960)

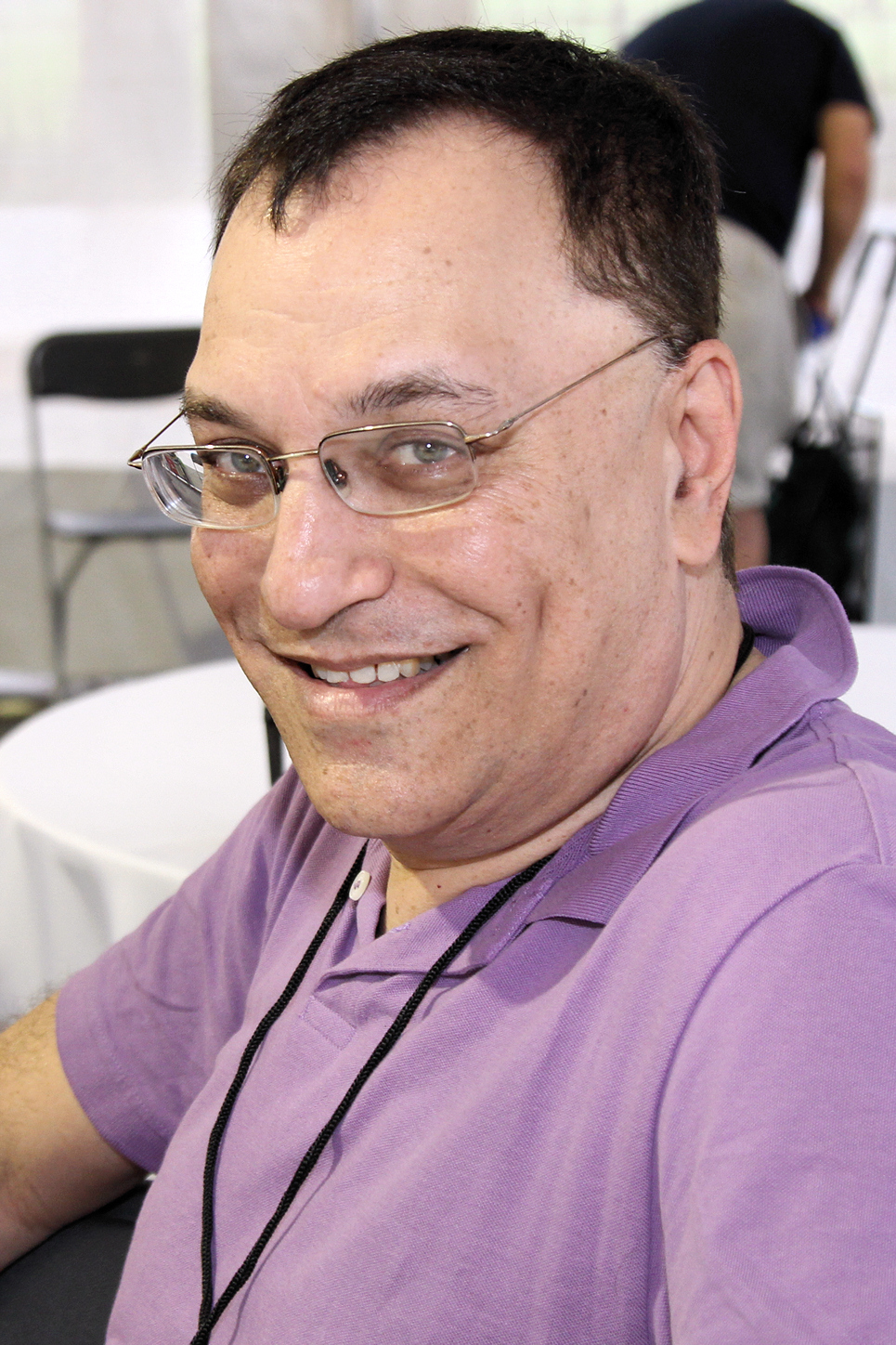
Fries at the 2017 Texas Book Festival

Kenny Fries (born September 22, 1960) is an American memoirist and poet. He is the author of In the Province of the Gods (2017), The History of My Shoes and the Evolution of Darwin's Theory (2007), Body, Remember: A Memoir (1997), and editor of Staring Back: The Disability Experience from the Inside Out (1997). He was commissioned by Houston Grand Opera to write the libretto for The Memory Stone, which premiered in 2013. His books of poems include In the Gardens of Japan (2017), Desert Walking (2006) and Anesthesia (2000). He received a 2009 Creative Capital grant in Innovative Literature, the 2007 Gustavus Myers Outstanding Book Award, the Gregory Kolovakos Award, a Creative Arts Fellowship from the Japan-U.S. Friendship Commission and the National Endowment, and has twice been a Fulbright Scholar (in Japan and Germany). In 2017, he created the Fries Test for disability in fiction and film, akin to the Bechdel Test for women.

== Early life and education ==
Fries was born in Brooklyn, New York. He graduated with an MFA from Columbia University's School for the Arts.

Fries graduated in 1977 from John Dewey high school and went on to pursue a degree in English and American Literature, at Brandeis University. He received a master's degree in Playwriting at Columbia University.

== Career ==
Kenny Fries officially started writing in 1988, after he had begun attending Millay Colony for the Arts. The majority of Fries' books and poems were written due to his experiences as a disabled, gay, Jewish man. Some of the writings that Fries has written include: Body, Remember: A Memoir (2003), Staring Back: The Disability Experience from the Inside Out, The History of My Shoes and the Evolution of Darwin's Theory (2007), Anesthesia: Poems by Kenny Fries (1996), Desert Walking: Poems (2000), The Healing Notebooks (1990) and Night After Night: Poems (1984). Some of the scholarly writings written by Fries include: "Songs of Whitman" (2003), "Comedy is Not a Crutch" (2001), and "Where Ecstasy Might Reside" (1995).

== Fries Test ==
Inspired by Alison Bechdel's test to determine if a creative work has a fair representation of women, Fries created the "Fries Test" for disability. Fries wrote that to pass the Fries Test, a creative work needs:

- to have more than one disabled character;
- the disabled characters need to have their own narrative purpose other than the education and profit of a nondisabled character;
- the characters' disability should not be eradicated either by curing or killing.

== Honors and awards ==
Kenny Fries received the 2007 Outstanding Book Award from the Gustavus Myers Center for the study of Bigotry and Human Rights. He was a Creative Arts Fellow of the Japan-US Friendship commission and the National Endowment for the Arts, as well as being twice a Fulbright scholar to Japan and Germany. In 2009, Fries received residency in the artists' community in Yaddo. In 2010 he received Ledig House International writers residency. Fries has also collaborated with composers Kumiko Takahashi and Yuka Takechi, and singer Mika Kimula on their new music work In the Gardens of Japan, which has been performed in Tokyo, Yokohama, and New York City. Fries has also received a grant in Literature from the Creative Capital to complete his memoir, In the Province of the Gods, which will be published September 19, 2017 by University of Wisconsin Press.

== Works ==
- The Healing Notebooks (1990)
- Anesthesia: Poems (1996)
- Body, Remember: A Memoir (1997)
- Staring Back: The Disability Experience from the Inside Out (1997)
- Desert Walking: Poems (2000)
- The History of My Shoes and the Evolution of Darwin's Theory (2007)
- The Memory Stone (2013)
- In the Gardens of Japan (2017)
- In the Province of the Gods (2017)
