= Gary Jackson (poet) =

American educator and poet

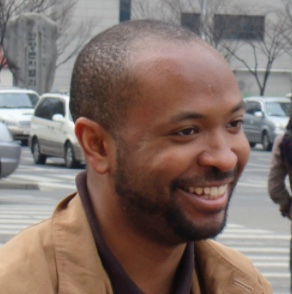
Gary Jackson

Gary Jackson is an American educator and poet. He had received a Cave Canem and Bread Loaf fellowship and was awarded the Cave Canem Poetry Prize in 2009.

== Personal life ==
Gary Jackson, born and raised in Topeka, Kansas, received a Bachelor's in English from Washburn University in 2004. And graduated from the University of New Mexico with an MFA in 2008. He lived and taught in South Korea for one year before returning to New Mexico.

Hired in 2013, he is on the faculty of the College of Charleston as assistant professor of Poetry. At Crazyhorse, he is Associate Poetry Editor. The Poetry Society of America selected him as one of 2013's New American Poets.

== Awards and fellowships ==
- Margaret Bridgman Fellowship in Poetry. Bread Loaf Writers’ Conference, Middlebury College. Aug. 2012.
- Cave Canem Retreat Fellowship. University of Pittsburgh at Greensburg. June 2012.
- Missing You, Metropolis. Winner of the 2009 Cave Canem Poetry Prize, judged by Yusef Komunyakaa.

== Publications ==
=== Books ===
- Missing You, Metropolis, Graywolf Press, 2009
- origin story, University of New Mexico Press, 2021

=== Anthologies ===
- “Luke Cage Tells It Like It is.” The Seagull Reader: Poems. Edited by Joseph Kelly. Published by W.W. Norton, 2015.
- “Things My Father Said” (Short Story). Roadside Curiosities: Stories About American Pop Culture. Edited by Shannon Cain. Leipziger Universitätsverlag, 2014.
- “Astro Boy Blues.” Multiverse! An Anthology of Superhero Poetry of Superhuman Proportions. Edited by Rob Sturma and Ryk Mcintyre. Published by Write Bloody Publishing, 2014.
- “Superia’s Swan Song,” “Old Lions,” and “Luke Cage Tells It Like It Is.” Drawn to Marvel: Poems from the Comic Books. Edited by Bryan D. Dietrich and Marta Ferguson. Published by Minor Arcana Press, Spring 2014.
- “Persons of Mass Destruction” (Comic Book). Shattered: The Asian American Comics Anthology (Secret Identities). Edited by Keith Chow, et al. Published by The New Press, November 2012.
- Afterword and “Elegy for Gwen Stacy.” Web-Spinning Heroics: Critical Essays on the History and Meaning of Spider-Man. Edited by Robert Moses Peaslee and Robert G. Weiner. Published by McFarland Publishing, May 2012.

=== Other ===
His work has been published in Shattered: The Asian-American Comics Anthology, as well as in 32 Poems, Tin House, Callaloo, Prairie Schooner, Crab Orchard Review, Los Angeles Review of Books, and Indiana Review.
