= Jonathan Goldberg =

American literary theorist (1943–2022)

- Born: June 11, 1943
- Died: December 9, 2022 (aged 79)
- Awards: Guggenheim Fellowship (1984)

Academic background
- Education: Columbia University (BA, MA, PhD)

Academic work
- Discipline: English Renaissance literature
- Institutions: Duke University; Johns Hopkins University; Emory University

Jonathan Goldberg (June 11, 1943 – December 9, 2022) was an American literary theorist who was the Sir William Osler Professor of English Literature at Johns Hopkins University, and Arts and Sciences Distinguished Professor Emeritus of English at Emory University where he directed Studies in Sexualities from 2008 to 2012. His work frequently deals with the connections between early modern literature and modern thought, particularly in issues of gender, sexuality, and materiality. He received his BA, MA, and PhD from Columbia University.

Goldberg received a Guggenheim Fellowship in 1984.

== Personal life and death ==
Goldberg was born in Kew Gardens, Queens on June 11, 1943.

Goldberg died in Decatur, Georgia, on December 9, 2022, at the age of 79.

== Bibliography ==
- Endlesse Worke: Spenser and the Structures of Discourse (1981)
- James I and the Politics of Literature: Jonson, Shakespeare, Donne, and Their Contemporaries (1983)
- Voice Terminal Echo: Postmodernism and English Renaissance Texts (1986)
- Writing Matter: From the Hands of the English Renaissance (1990)
- Major Works, John Milton (1991, co-editor)
- Sodometries: Renaissance Texts, Modern Sexualities (1992)
- Queering the Renaissance (1994, editor)
- Reclaiming Sodom (1994, editor)
- Desiring Women Writing (1997)
- The Generation of Caliban (2001)
- Willa Cather and Others (2001)
- Shakespeare's Hand (2003)
- Tempest in the Caribbean (2004)
- The Seeds of Things (2009)
- Eve Kosofsky Sedgwick, The Weather in Proust (2012, editor)
- Strangers on a Train (2012)
- This Distracted Globe (2016, co-editor)
- Melodrama: An Aesthetics of Impossibility (2016)
- Sappho: ]fragments (2018)
- Saint Marks: Words, Images, and What Persists (2019)
- Come As You Are After Eve Kosofsky Sedgwick (2021)
