= 26th Lambda Literary Awards =

2014 literary awards ceremony

The 26th Lambda Literary Awards were held on June 2, 2014, to honour works of LGBT literature published in 2013. The list of nominees was released on March 6.

The ceremony was held at Cooper Union, in conjunction with Book Expo America.

== Special awards ==
Category	Winner
Pioneer Award	Kate Bornstein
Trustee Award	Alison Bechdel
Betty Berzon Emerging Writer Award	Imogen Binnie, Charles Rice-González
Jim Duggins Outstanding Mid-Career Novelists' Prize	Michael Thomas Ford, Radclyffe

== Nominees and winners ==
Category	Winner	Nominated
Bisexual Fiction	Susan Choi, My Education	Mel Bossa, In His Secret Life; Nicola Griffith, Hild; David Leavitt, The Two Hotel Francforts; Bushra Rehman, Corona
Bisexual Non-Fiction	Maria San Filippo, The B Word: Bisexuality in Contemporary Film and Television	Clive Davis, The Soundtrack of My Life; Shiri Eisner, Biː Notes for a Bisexual Revolution
Gay Erotica	Alex Jeffers, The Padisah's Son and the Fox	Winston Gieseke, ed., Team Players: Gay Erotic Stories; Richard Labonté, ed., Show-Offs: Gay Erotic Stories; Michael Luongo, ed., Sensual Travels: Gay Erotic Stories; Aleksandr Voinov and L. A. Witt, Capture & Surrender
Gay Fiction	Luis Negrón (tr. Suzanne Jill Levine), Mundo Cruel	Jasmine Beach-Ferrara, Damn Love; Caleb Crain, Necessary Errors; Jason K. Friedman, Fire Year; Allan Gurganus, Local Souls; Greg Kearney, The Desperates; Manil Suri, The City of Devi; Glenway Wescott (ed. Jerry Rosco), A Visit to Priapus and Other Stories; Rick Whitaker, An Honest Ghost; John Stewart Wynne, The Red Shoes
Gay Memoir/Biography	Glenway Wescott (ed. Jerry Rosco), A Heaven of Words: Last Journals	Alysia Abbott, Fairyland: A Memoir of My Father; Blake Bailey, Farther and Wilder: The Lost Weekends and Literary Dreams of Charles Jackson; Jim Elledge, Henry Darger, Throwaway Boy: The Tragic Life of an Outsider Artist; Didier Eribon, Returning to Reims; Perry N. Halkitis, The AIDS Generation: Stories of Survival and Resilience; Hillary Holladay, American Hipster: A Life of Herbert Huncke, The Times Square Hustler Who Inspired the Beat Movement; David Margolick, Dreadful: The Short Life and Gay Times of John Horne Burns; Richard Rodriguez, Darling: A Spiritual Autobiography; Tim Teeman, In Bed With Gore Vidal
Gay Mystery	Janice Law, The Prisoner of the Riviera	Sarah Black, The General and the Elephant Clock of Al-Jazari; Jonathan Gregory, In Real Life; Greg Herren, Baton Rouge Bingo; David Lennon, Fierce; John Michaelsen, Pretty Boy Dead; Garry Ryan, Foxed; Joyce Thompson, How to Greet Strangers; Marshall Thornton, Boystown 5: Murder Book; Mark Zubro, Pawn of Satan
Gay Poetry	Rigoberto González, Unpeopled Eden	Frank Bidart, Metaphysical Dog; Rafael Campo, Alternative Medicine; David Groff, Clay; Michael Klein, The Talking Day; Randall Mann, Straight Razor; Angelo Nikolopoulos, Obscenely Yours; Carl Phillips, Silverchest; Michael D. Snediker, The Apartment of Tragic Appliances; Brian Teare, Companion Grasses
Gay Romance	TJ Klune, Into This River I Drown	Larry Benjamin, Unbroken; L. C. Chase, Pickup Men; L. A. Fields, My Dear Watson; Alexis Hall, Glitterland; Edmond Manning, King Mai; Madison Parker, Play Me, I’m Yours; J. H. Trumble, Where You Are; Lynley Wayne, Rocky’s Road; L. A. Witt, Covet Thy Neighbor
Lesbian Erotica	Sacchi Green, ed., Wild Girls Wild Nights: True Lesbian Sex Stories	Kathleen Warnock, ed., Best Lesbian Erotica 2014; Rebekah Weatherspoon, At Her Feet
Lesbian Fiction	Chinelo Okparanta, Happiness, Like Water	e.E. Charlton-Trujillo, Fat Angie; T. Greenwood, Bodies of Water; Christiana Harrell, Cream; Wally Lamb, We Are Water; Ali Liebegott, Cha-Ching!; Jean Ryan, Survival Skills; Jeanette Winterson, The Daylight Gate; Chavisa Woods, The Albino Album; Kate Worsley, She Rises
Lesbian Memoir/Biography	Barrie Jean Borich, Body Geographic	Amber Dawn, How Poetry Saved My Life; Annie Lanzillotto, L is for Lion: An Italian Bronx Butch Freedom Memoir; Donna Minkowitz, Growing Up Golem; Caroline Paul and Wendy MacNaughton, Lost Cat: A True Story of Love, Desperation, and GPS Technology
Lesbian Mystery	Katherine V. Forrest, High Desert	Laura Antoniou, The Killer Wore Leather; R.E. Bradshaw, The Rainey Season; Ian Hamilton, The Wild Beasts of Wuhan; Ellen Hart, Taken by the Wind; Anne Holt, Death of the Demon; Val McDermid, Cross and Burn; Jenna Rae, Turning on the Tide; Ann Roberts, Point of Betrayal; Jean Sheldon, She Overheard Murder; Diane Wood, Web of Obsessions
Lesbian Poetry	Ana Božičević, Rise in the Fall	Ai, The Collected Poems of Ai; Tamiko Beyer, We Come Elemental; Sophie Cabot Black, The Exchange; R. Erica Doyle, Proxy; Eloise Klein Healy, A Wild Surmise: New & Selected Poems & Recordings; Kamilah Aisha Moon, She Has a Name; Suzanne Parker, Viral; Veronica Reyes, Chopper! Chopper! Poetry From Bordered Lives; Elizabeth Lindsey Rogers, Chord Box
Lesbian Romance	Andrea Bramhall, Clean Slate	Lynn Ames, All That Lies Within; Mason Dixon, Date with Destiny; Gerri Hill, At Seventeen; Karin Kallmaker, Love by the Numbers; D. Jackson Leigh, Hold Me Forever; Ann McMan and Salem West, Hoosier Daddy; D. Jordan Redhawk, Broken Trails; Tracey Richardson, Last Salute; Nell Stark, The Princess Affair
LGBT Anthology	Karen Martin and Makhosazana Xaba, Queer Africa: New and Collected Fiction; Jim Elledge and David Groff, Who's Yer Daddy?: Gay Writers Celebrate Their Mentors and Forerunners	Jason Edward Black and Charles E. Morris, An Archive of Hope: Harvey Milk’s Speeches and Writings; Adelaida R. Del Castillo and Gibran Guido, Queer in Aztlan: Chicano Male Recollentions of Consciousness and Coming Out; Brittany Fonte and Regie Cabico, Flicker and Spark: A Contemporary Queer Anthology of Spoken Word and Poetry; Evan J. Peterson and Vincent Kovar, Ghosts in Gaslight. Monsters in Steam. Gay City: Volume 5; Vivek Shraya, What I LOVE about being QUEER; Tristan Taormino, Constance Penley, Celine Parrenas Shimizu and Mireille Miller-Young, The Feminist Porn Book; T. C. Tolbert and Tim Trace Peterson, Troubling the Line: Trans and Genderqueer Poetry and Poetics; Megan Volpert, This Assignment Is So Gay: LGBTIQ Poets on the Art of Teaching
LGBT Children's/Young Adult	Sara Farizan, If You Could Be Mine; David Levithan, Two Boys Kissing	Rhiannon Argo, Girls I’ve Run Away With; Tim Federle, Better Nate Than Ever; Aaron Hartzler, Rapture Practice; Alaya Dawn Johnson, The Summer Prince; Bill Konigsberg, Openly Straight; Stewart Lewis, The Secret Ingredient; Christopher R. Michael, Boy in Box; Cory Silverberg and Fiona Smyth, What Makes a Baby; Julia Watts, Secret City
LGBT Debut Fiction	Nik Nicholson, Descendants of Hagar	Guy Mark Foster, The Rest of Us; Jane Hoppen, In Between; Laura Krughoff, My Brother’s Name; Amy Grace Loyd, The Affairs of Others; Derek Palacio, How to Shake the Other Man; Ronald Palmer, Prick Queasy; Charles L. Ross, Inside; Andrea Routley, Jane and the Whales; Abigail Tarttelin, Golden Boy
LGBT Drama	Michel Marc Bouchard, Tom at the Farm	Adelina Anthony, Las Hociconas: Three Locas with Big Mouths and Even Bigger Brains; Djola Branner, sash & trim and other plays
LGBT Graphic Novel	Nicole Georges, Calling Dr. Laura: A Graphic Memoir	Alex Woolfson and Winona Nelson, Artifice; Tana Ford, Duck! Second Chances; Vivek Tiwary, Andrew C. Robinson, Kyle Baker and Steve Dutro, The Fifth Beatle: The Brian Epstein Story
LGBT Non-Fiction	Hilton Als, White Girls	Dennis Altman, The End of the Homosexual?; Michael Bronski, Ann Pellegrini and Michael Amico, You Can Tell Just By Looking: And 20 Other Myths about LGBT Life and People; Jeff Chu, Does Jesus Really Love Me?; Thomas Glave, Among the Bloodpeople; Scott Siraj al-Haqq Kugle, Living Out Islam: Voices of Gay, Lesbian, and Transgender Muslims; Matt Richardson, The Queer Limit of Black Memory Black Lesbian Literature and Irresolution; Daniel Winunwe Rivers, Radical Relations: Lesbian Mothers, Gay Fathers, and Their Children in the United States since World War II; Ben Smales, Tom Bianchi and Edmund White, Tom Bianchi: Fire Island Pines. Polaroids 1975-1983; Phil Tiemeyer, Plane Queer: Labor, Sexuality, and AIDS in the History of Male Flight Attendants; Jaime Woo, Meet Grindr: How One App Changed the Way We Connect
LGBT Science Fiction/Fantasy/Horror	Melissa Scott and Amy Griswold, Death by Silver	Richard Bowes, Dust Devil on a Quiet Street; Nathan Burgoine, Light; Isabella Carter, Dragon Slayer; Marie Castle, Hell’s Belle; Roberta Degnore, Invisible Soft Return; Alex Jeffers, Deprivation; or, Benedetto furioso: an oneiromancy; Mary Anne Mohanraj, The Stars Change; Lee Thomas, Like Light for Flies; Deborah Wheeler, Collaborators
LGBT Studies	Christina B. Hanhardt, Safe Space: Gay Neighborhood History and the Politics of Violence	Marlon M. Bailey, Butch Queens Up in Pumps Gender, Performance, and Ballroom Culture in Detroit; Peter M. Coviello, Tomorrow’s Parties: Sex and the Untimely; Lisa Henderson, Love and Money: Queers, Class, and Cultural Production; Victoria Hesford, Feeling Women’s Liberation; Colin R. Johnson, Just Queer Folks: Gender and Sexuality in Rural America; Lucetta Yip Lo Kam, Shanghai Lalas; Afsaneh Najmabadi, Professing Selves: Transsexuality and Same-Sex Desire in Contemporary Iran; Susana Pena, Oye Loca: From the Mariel Boatlift to Gay Cuban Miami; Isaac West, Transforming Citizenships: Transgender Articulations of the Law
Transgender Fiction	Trish Salah, Wanting in Arabic	Imogen Binnie, Nevada; Devon Llywelyn Jones, Tiresias
Transgender Non-Fiction	Mattilda Bernstein Sycamore, The End of San Francisco	S. Bear Bergman, Blood, Marriage, Wine & Glitter; Beatriz Preciado, Testo Junkie
