= Lambda Literary Award for Lesbian Poetry =

Annual literary award

- Awarded for: Literary award
- Sponsored by: Lambda Literary Foundation
- Date: Annual
- Website: http://www.lambdaliterary.org

The Lambda Literary Award for Lesbian Poetry is an annual literary award, presented by the Lambda Literary Foundation to a lesbian-themed book of poetry by a female writer. At the first two Lambda Literary Awards in 1989 and 1990, a single award for LGBT Poetry, irrespective of gender, was presented. Beginning with the 3rd Lambda Literary Awards in 1991, the poetry award was split into two separate awards for Lesbian Poetry and Gay Poetry, which have been presented continuously since then except at the 20th Lambda Literary Awards in 2008, when a merged LGBTQ poetry award was again presented for that year only.

== Recipients ==
Lambda Literary Award for Lesbian Poetry winners and finalists
Year	Author	Title	Result	Ref.
1991	Marilyn Hacker	Going Back to the River	Winner	
1991	Irena Klepfisz	A Few Words in the Mother Tongue	Finalist	
1991	S. Diane Bogus	Chant of the Women of Magdalena	Finalist	
1991	Minnie Bruce Pratt	Crime Against Nature	Finalist	
1991	Yvonne Zipter	Patience of Metal	Finalist	
1992	Adrienne Rich	An Atlas of the Difficult World: Poems 1988-1991	Winner	
1992	Eloise Klein Healy	Artemis in Echo Park	Finalist	
1992	Maureen Seaton	Fear of Subways	Finalist	
1992	Eileen Myles	Not Me	Finalist	
1992	Becky Birtha	The Forbidden Poems	Finalist	
1993	Audre Lorde	Undersong	Winner	
1993	Nancy Boutilier	According to Her Contours	Finalist	
1993	Terry Wolverton	Black Slip	Finalist	
1993	Lori Anderson	Cultivating Excess	Finalist	
1993	Diane Stein	Lady Sun, Lady Moon	Finalist	
1994	Audre Lorde	The Marvelous Arithmetics of Distance	Winner	
1994	May Sarton	Collected Poems (1930–1993)	Finalist	
1994	Cheryl Clarke	Experimental Love Poetry	Finalist	
1994	Kate Rushin	The Black Back-Ups	Finalist	
1994	Cherrie Moraga	The Last Generation	Finalist	
1995	Marilyn Hacker	Winter Numbers	Winner	
1995	Sapphire	American Dreams	Finalist	
1995	June Jordan	Haruko/Love Poems	Finalist	
1995	Linda Smukler	Normal Sex	Finalist	
1995	Mary Oliver	White Pine	Finalist	
1996	Adrienne Rich	Dark Fields of the Republic	Winner	
1996	Chrystos	Fire Power	Finalist	
1996	Gerry Gomez Pearlberg	Key to Everything	Finalist	
1996	Eileen Myles	Maxfield Parrish	Finalist	
1996	Jewelle Gomez	Oral Tradition	Finalist	
1997	Robin Becker	All-American Girl	Winner	
1997	Maureen Seaton	Furious Cooking	Winner	
1997	Clare Coss	Arc of Love	Finalist	
1997	Linda Smukler	Home in Three Days. Don't Wash.	Finalist	
1997	Jeredith Merrin	Shift	Finalist	
1998	Joan Larkin	Cold River	Winner	
1998	Eileen Myles	School of Fish	Winner	
1998	Pat Califia	Diesel Fuel	Finalist	
1998	Emma Donoghue	Poems Between Women	Finalist	
1998	Gerry Gomez Pearlberg	Queer Dog: Homo/Pup/Poetry	Finalist	
1999	Gerry Gomez Pearlberg	Marianne Faithfull's Cigarette	Winner	
1999	Pamela Sneed	Imagine Being More Afraid of Freedom than Slavery	Finalist	
1999	Beatrix Gates	In the Open	Finalist	
1999	Letta Neely	Juba	Finalist	
1999	Leslea Newman	The Little Butch Book	Finalist	
2000	Olga Broumas	Rave	Winner	
2000	Brenda Shaughnessy	Interior With Sudden Joy	Finalist	
2000	Adrienne Rich	Midnight Salvage	Finalist	
2000	Rita Wong	Monkeypuzzle	Finalist	
2000	Minnie Bruce Pratt	Walking Back Up Depot Street	Finalist	
2001	Elena Georgiou	Mercy Mercy Me	Winner	
2001	Joy Harjo	A Map to the Next World	Finalist	
2001	Nancy Boutilier	And on the Eighth Day Adam Slept Alone	Finalist	
2001	Leslea Newman	Signs of Love	Finalist	
2001	Robin Becker	The Horse Fair	Finalist	
2002	Adrienne Rich	Fox	Winner	
2002	Letta Neely	Here	Finalist	
2002	Gerry Gomez Pearlberg	Mr. Bluebird	Finalist	
2002	Eileen Myles	Skies	Finalist	
2002	Daphne Gottlieb	Why Things Burn	Finalist	
2003	Ellen Bass	Mules of Love	Winner	
2003	C. C. Carter	Body Language	Finalist	
2003	Eloise Klein Healy	Passing	Finalist	
2003	Melanie Braverman	Red	Finalist	
2003	Jenny Factor	Unraveling	Finalist	
2004	Minnie Bruce Pratt	The Dirt She Ate	Winner	
2004	Terry Wolverton	Embers	Finalist	
2004	Daphne Gottlieb	Final Girl	Finalist	
2004	Susan McCabe	Swirl	Finalist	
2004	Michelle Tea	The Beautiful	Finalist	
2005	Beverly Burch	Sweet to Burn	Winner	
2005	Amy King	Antidotes for an Alibi	Finalist	
2005	Carol Guess	Femme's Dictionary	Finalist	
2005	Adrienne Rich	The School Among the Ruins	Finalist	
2005	Mary Oliver	Why I Wake Early	Finalist	
2006	June Jordan	Directed by Desire: Collected Poems	Winner	
2006	Amber Flora Thomas	Eye of Water	Finalist	
2006	Jackie Kay	Life Mask	Finalist	
2006	Mary Oliver	New and Selected Poems, Volume II	Finalist	
2006	Samiya Bashir	Where the Apple Falls	Finalist	
2007	Sina Queyras	Lemon Hound	Winner	
2007	Cheryl Clarke	Days of Good Looks	Finalist	
2007	Robin Becker	Domain of Perfect Affection	Finalist	
2007	Juliet Patterson	The Truant Lover	Finalist	
2007	Nathalie Stephens	Touch to Affliction	Finalist	
2008	No award presented			
2009	Judy Grahn	love belongs to those who do the feeling	Winner	
2009	Elizabeth Bradfield	Interpretive Work	Finalist	
2009	Daphne Gottlieb	Kissing Dead Girls	Finalist	
2009	Maureen N. McLane	Same Life	Finalist	
2009	Nancy K. Pearson	Two Minutes of Light	Finalist	
2010	Stacie Cassarino	Zero at the Bone	Winner	
2010	Kristin Naca	Bird Eating Bird	Finalist	
2010	Samiya Bashir	Gospel: Poems	Finalist	
2010	Marilyn Hacker	Names	Finalist	
2010	Ana Božičević	Stars of the Night Commute	Finalist	
2011	Anna Swanson	The Nights Also	Winner	
2011	Elizabeth J. Colen	Money for Sunsets	Finalist	
2011	Jen Currin	The Inquisition Yours	Finalist	
2011	Eleanor Lerman	The Sensual World Re-Emerges	Finalist	
2011	Laurie MacFadyen	White Shirt	Finalist	
2012	Leah Lakshmi Piepzna-Samarasinha	Love Cake	Winner	
2012	Daphne Gottlieb	15 Ways to Stay Alive	Finalist	
2012	Dawn Lundy Martin	Discipline	Finalist	
2012	Julie R. Enszer (ed.)	Milk and Honey: A Celebration of Jewish Lesbian Poetry	Finalist	
2012	Christina Hutchins	The Stranger Dissolves	Finalist	
2013	Etel Adnan	Sea and Fog	Winner	
2013	Kathryn L. Pringle	fault tree	Finalist	
2013	Julia Bloch	Letters to Kelly Clarkson	Finalist	
2013	Eileen Myles	snowflake/different streets	Finalist	
2013	Marty McConnell	wine for a shotgun	Finalist	
2014	Ana Božičević	Rise in the Fall	Winner	
2014	Eloise Klein Healy	A Wild Surmise: New & Selected Poems & Recordings	Finalist	
2014	Veronica Reyes	Chopper! Chopper! Poetry From Bordered Lives	Finalist	
2014	Elizabeth Lindsey Rogers	Chord Box	Finalist	
2014	R. Erica Doyle	Proxy	Finalist	
2014	Kamilah Aisha Moon	She Has a Name	Finalist	
2014	Ai	The Collected Poems of Ai	Finalist	
2014	Sophie Cabot Black	The Exchange	Finalist	
2014	Suzanne Parker	Viral	Finalist	
2014	Tamiko Beyer	We Come Elemental	Finalist	
2015	Valerie Wetlaufer	Mysterious Acts by My People	Winner	
2015	Lenelle Moïse	Haiti Glass	Finalist	
2015	Rachel Zolf	Janey's Arcadia	Finalist	
2015	Meg Day	Last Psalm at Sea Level	Finalist	
2015	Ellen Bass	Like a Beggar	Finalist	
2015	Sina Queyras	MxT	Finalist	
2015	Megan Volpert	Only Ride	Finalist	
2015	Susanna Mishler	Termination Dust	Finalist	
2016	Dawn Lundy Martin	Life in a Box is a Pretty Life	Winner	
2016	Claudia Rodriguez	Everybody's Bread	Finalist	
2016	Sara Jane Stoner	Experience in the Medium of Destruction	Finalist	
2016	Margot Douaihy	Girls Like You	Finalist	
2016	Jessica Jacobs	Pelvis with Distance	Finalist	
2016	J. P. Howard	Say/Mirror: Poems and Histories	Finalist	
2016	Stephanie Gray	Shorthand and Electric Language Stars	Finalist	
2016	Melissa Buzzeo	The Devastation	Finalist	
2017	Pat Parker (Julie R. Enszer, ed.)	Complete Works of Pat Parker	Winner	
2017	Francine J. Harris	play dead	Winner	
2017	Donika Kelly	Bestiary	Finalist	
2017	Etel Adnan	Night	Finalist	
2017	Stacy Szymaszek	Sinister Wisdom/A Midsummer Night's Press Journal of Ugly Sites	Finalist	
2017	Stephanie Adams-Santos	Swarm Queen's Crown	Finalist	
2017	Vi Khi Nao	The Old Philosopher	Finalist	
2017	Arisa White	You're the Most Beautiful Thing That Happened	Finalist	
2018	Rosamond S. King	Rock | Salt | Stone	Winner	
2018	Constance Merritt	Blind Girl Grunt	Finalist	
2018	Sarah Pinder	Common Place	Finalist	
2018	Dawn Lundy Martin	Good Stock Strange Blood	Finalist	
2018	Ana-Maurine Lara	Kohnjehr Woman	Finalist	
2018	Sina Queyras	My Ariel	Finalist	
2018	Ife-Chudeni A. Oputa	Rummage	Finalist	
2018	Jen Bervin	Silk Poems	Finalist	
2019	Nina Puro	Each Tree Could Hold a Noose or a House	Winner	
2019	Emilia Nielsen	Body Work	Finalist	
2019	Eileen Myles	Evolution	Finalist	
2019	Marylyn Tan	Gaze Back	Finalist	
2019	T. Liem	Obits.	Finalist	
2019	Kristin Chang	Past Lives	Finalist	
2019	Etel Adnan	Surge	Finalist	
2019	Jane Miller	Who Is Trixie the Trasher? And Other Questions	Finalist	
2020	t'ai freedom ford	& more black	Winner	
2020	Rocío Carlos	(the other house)	Finalist	
2020	Shira Erlichman	Odes to Lithium	Finalist	
2020	Sharanpal Ruprai	Pressure Cooker Love Bomb	Finalist	
2020	Franny Choi	Soft Science	Finalist	
2020	Etel Adnan	Time	Finalist	
2020	Lee Ann Roripaugh	tsunami vs. the fukushima 50	Finalist	
2020	Gala Mukomolova	Without Protection	Finalist	
2021	Pamela Sneed	Funeral Diva	Winner	
2021	Kimberly Alidio	: once teeth bones coral :	Finalist	
2021	Roya Marsh	dayliGht	Finalist	
2021	Sarah M. Sala	Devil's Lake	Finalist	
2021	Mary Jean Chan	Flèche	Finalist	
2022	Tamiko Beyer	Last Days	Winner	
2022	Rosamond S. King	All the Rage	Finalist	
2022	Grace Lau	The Language We Were Never Taught to Speak	Finalist	
2022	Donika Kelly	The Renunciations: Poems	Finalist	
2022	Arisa White	Who's Your Daddy	Finalist	
2023	Shelley Wong	As She Appears	Winner	
2023	Natalie Wee	Beast at Every Threshold	Finalist	
2023	Courtney Faye Taylor	Concentrate	Finalist	
2023	Brynne Rebele-Henry	Prelude	Finalist	
2023	Rage Hezekiah	Yearn	Finalist	
2024	Kimberly Alidio	Teeter	Winner	
2024	Alyse Knorr	Ardor	Finalist	
2024	Brionne Janae	Because You Were Mine	Finalist	
2024	Maggie Millner	Couplets	Finalist	
2024	Stephanie Adams-Santos	Dream of Xibalba	Finalist	
2025	Omotara James	Song of My Softening	Winner	
2025	Saretta Morgan	Alt-Nature	Finalist	
2025	Tanya Olson	Born Backwards	Finalist	
2025	Koss	Dancing Backwards Towards Pluperfect	Finalist	
2025	Dawn Lundy Martin	Instructions for the Lovers	Finalist	
2025	Rae Gouirand	The Velvet Book	Finalist	
2026	Bianca Rae Messinger	Pleasureis Amiracle	Winner	
2026	Sophia Dahlin	Glove Money	Finalist	
2026	Donika Kelly	The Natural Order of Things	Finalist	
2026	Roya Marsh	savings time	Finalist	
2026	Judite Teixeira, translated by Samantha Pious	Cactus Flowers: Selected Poems	Finalist	
