= Kimberly Alidio =

American writer (born 1971)

- Born: July 9, 1971 (age 55) Baltimore, Maryland, US
- Education: Oberlin College (BA); University of Arizona (MFA); University of Michigan (PhD)

Website
- kimberlyalidio.com

Kimberly Alidio (born 1971) is an American historian and writer whose work includes prose, poetry, and audio-visual works. Alidio's writing has been published in various literary journals and magazines, as well as individual chapbooks and books. Her poetry has been described as avant-garde and often explores topics related to migration, Filipinx diaspora, and queerness.

== Biography ==
Alidio was born July 9, 1971, in Baltimore, Maryland. Although she grew up in a Filipino immigrant household that spoke Tagalog and Pangasinan, Alidio is monolingual, which she has stated contributes to her work. Alidio earned a Bachelor of Arts in English and history from Oberlin College, a Master of Fine Arts in poetry from the University of Arizona, and a Doctor of Philosophy in history from the University of Michigan.

Alidio uses she/they pronouns. As of 2026, she lives in the Hudson Valley with their partner, fellow poet Stacy Szymaszek.

== Writing ==
Alidio's writing has been published in various literary journals and magazines, as well as individual chapbooks and books. As of 2026, she has published five books: after projects the resound (2016), :once teeth bones coral : (2020), why letter ellipses (2020), Teeter (2023), and Traceable Relation (2025). Her poetry has been described as avant-garde.

Alidio's first book, after projects the resound, was published with Black Radish Books on August 15, 2016. The book explores themes related to "empire, migration, diaspora, and queerness" through "reverberating word play, experiments with sound, and even through the strategic use of white space".

:once teeth bones coral :, Alidio's second book, was published with Belladonna* on August 1, 2020, and consists of seven long poems. In a review for The Bind, MT Vallarta described how the work's "language is stripped to the bone, to its barest and most provocative form". On behalf of the American Library Association, Rebecca Stoddard similarly discussed how the "poems linger on and about and throughout the pages, both spatially and semantically, with very little connective tissue", adding that "there is often far more white space than text, far more time for thought, for meaning making, for consideration, and as such the stark words often collide with each other and the space around them forming both echo and location". Vallarta further noted that "queerness flourishes not only as a motif, but as the very method Alidio uses to establish her aesthetic". :once teeth bones coral : was a finalist for the 2021 Lambda Literary Award for Lesbian Poetry.

Also in 2020, Alidio published why letter ellipses with selva oscura press. According to Morgan Võ, the book explores "the expansive possibilities for intimacy that queerness presents in a heteronormative society", alongside "the consequences of being erased beneath the expected roles of the marginalized".

Alidio's fourth book, Teeter, was published with Nightboat Books on July 18, 2023. With a strong focus on sound, the autohistoriographical book consists of three long poems: "Hearing", "Ambient Mom", and "Histories". As with previous books, Teeter explores themes related to "20th-century Filipinx diaspora with scenes of queer postcolonial domesticity and desire". It won the 2024 Lambda Literary Award for Lesbian Poetry, as well as the Nightboat Poetry Prize.

Alidio published Traceable Relation with Fonograf Editions on September 16, 2025.

== Books ==
- after projects the resound. Black Radish Books. 2016. ISBN 978-0-9964001-8-3.
- : once teeth bones coral :. Belladonna* Collaborative. 2020. ISBN 978-0-9988439-4-0.
- why letter ellipses. selva oscura press. 2020. ISBN 978-0-9909453-5-2.
- Teeter. Nightboat Books. 2023. ISBN 978-1-643-62173-9.
- Traceable Relation. Fonograf Editions. 2025. ISBN 978-1-964499-42-0.
