= Lambda Literary Award for Poetry =

Annual literary award

Lambda Literary Award for LGBTQ+ Poetry
- Awarded for: Literary award
- Sponsored by: Lambda Literary Foundation
- Date: Annual
- Website: www.lambdaliterary.org

The Lambda Literary Award for LGBTQ+ Poetry is an annual literary award, presented by the Lambda Literary Foundation to a LGBTQ+ themed book of poetry.

At the first two Lambda Literary Awards in 1989 and 1990, a single award for Poetry was presented, irrespective of gender. Beginning with the 3rd Lambda Literary Awards in 1991, the poetry award was split into two separate awards for Gay Poetry and Lesbian Poetry, which have been presented continuously since then except at the 20th Lambda Literary Awards in 2008, when a merged LGBTQ poetry award was again presented for that year only. In 2016, an award for Transgender Poetry was introduced and has been presented every year since; likewise an award for Bisexual Poetry has been presented since 2019.

In 2024, an award for LGBTQ+ Poetry was again shortlisted, in addition to the 4 newer categories.

== Honorees ==
Lambda Literary Award for LGBTQ+ Poetry winners and finalists
Year	Author	Title	Result	Ref.
1989	Carl Morse and Joan Larkin (eds.)	Gay & Lesbian Poetry in our Time	Winner	
1989	Josephine Balmer (transl.)	Sappho: Poems and Fragments	Finalist	
1989	James Merrill	The Inner Room	Finalist	
1989	Paul Monette	Love Alone: Eighteen Elegies for Rog	Finalist	
1989	May Sarton	The Silence Now	Finalist	
1990	Michael Klein	Poets for Life	Winner	
1990	Cheryl Clarke	Humid Pitch: Narrative Poetry	Finalist	
1990	Robert Glück	Reader	Finalist	
1990	Christian McEwen	Naming the Waves	Finalist	
1990	Adrienne Rich	Time's Power: Poems 1985–1988	Finalist	
1991–2007	See separate awards for Gay Poetry and Lesbian Poetry			
2008 (Note: As "Lambda Literary Award for LGBT Poetry")	Henri Cole	Blackbird and Wolf	Winner	
2008	Dawn Lundy Martin	A Gathering of Matter/A Matter of Gathering	Finalist	
2008	Carol Potter	Otherwise Obedient	Finalist	
2008	Reginald Shepherd	Fata Morgana	Finalist	
2008	C. Dale Young	The Second Person	Finalist	
2008	Syd Zolf (Note: Shortlisted under their deadname)	Human Resources	Finalist	
2009–2015	See separate awards for Gay Poetry and Lesbian Poetry			
2016–2018	See awards for Gay Poetry, Lesbian Poetry and Transgender Poetry			
2019–2023	See awards for Gay Poetry, Lesbian Poetry, Transgender Poetry and Bisexual Poetry			
2024 (Note: In 2024, as well as a combined "Lambda Literary Award for LGBTQ+ Poetry", poetry was also shortlisted in the separate categories of Gay Poetry, Lesbian Poetry, Transgender Poetry and Bisexual Poetry.)	Quinn Carver Johnson	The Perfect Bastard	Winner	
2024	Robin Gow	Lanternfly August	Finalist	
2024	Destiny Hemphill	motherworld: a devotional for the alter-life	Finalist	
2024	Sam Sax	Pig	Finalist	
2024	Alina Pleskova	Toska	Finalist	
2025	Eduardo Martínez-Leyva	Cowboy Park	Winner	
2025	Jes Battis	I Hate Parties	Finalist	
2025	Zoe Whittall	No Credit River	Finalist	
2025	Emilia Phillips	Nonbinary Bird of Paradise	Finalist	
2025	Cass Donish	Your Dazzling Death	Finalist	
2026	jason b. crawford	Yeet!	Winner	
2026	Eli Clare	Unfurl: Survivals, Sorrows, and Dreaming	Finalist	
2026	Qurat Dar	Non-Prophet	Finalist	
2026	heidi andrea restrepo rhodes	Wayward Creatures	Finalist	
2026	Stacey Waite	A Real Man Would Have a Gun: Poems	Finalist	
