= Last Days (poetry collection) =

2021 poetry collection by Tamiko Beyer

- Author: Tamiko Beyer
- Publisher: Alice James Books
- Publication date: April 13, 2021
- ISBN: 978-1948579162
- Preceded by: Dovetail
- Followed by: Poetry as Spellcasting

Last Days is a 2021 poetry collection by Tamiko Beyer, published by Alice James Books. The book won the Lambda Literary Award for Lesbian Poetry and was a finalist for the Julie Suk Award.

== Contents and background ==
One of Beyer's poem-stories preceding the book's publication, "Last Days, Part 1", won the PEN/Robert J. Dau Short Story Prize for Emerging Writers in 2019. Its ideas would later be revised and included in the book itself.

For the book's launch, Beyer hosted an event, "Seeds Bursting Open in Fire", to gather over 60 attendees and discuss the social, political issues relevant to the book's poetry, among them the environment. Beyer also executed a different book distribution model by fundraising enough to give the book to over 200 "organizers, campaigners, activists, cultural workers, and healers" along with Gabrielle Civil's new chapbook, ( ghost gestures ).

== Critical reception ==
The Adroit Journal commended Beyer's optimism in the face of apocalyptic threats like climate change and other forms of environmental degradation. The reviewer stated "the collection envisions a societal renaissance toward justice and equity, toward an evolved consciousness that sees all living matter as a part of a singular, vast, interdependent organism."

RHINO said the book "is song-filled and feathered; a murmuration; a brilliant manifesto for survival." The reviewer, Luisa Igloria, observed the rich diversity of styles ranging from triptychs and zuihitsus to haibun and tanka.

Ilanot Review stated "As we find ourselves in the overwhelming midst of so many interwoven crises—climate change, global pandemic, political turmoil—Tamiko Beyer's Last Days is a collection of poems that walks bravely to the edge of the precipice to observe and confront the long-entrenched violences wrought by white supremacy, heteropatriarchy, and capitalism."
