= Emily Luan =

American poet

Emily Lee Luan is an American poet. She is the author of two prize-winning books of poetry: I Watch the Boughs, which was the recipient of a chapbook fellowship by the Poetry Society of America, and 回 / Return, which won the Nightboat Poetry Prize.

== Early life and education ==
Luan's parents grew up in Taiwan. Occasionally, Luan went back to Taiwan with her parents when she was young. Later, she graduated from Middlebury College as an English major in 2015; she had worked at the New England Review in 2014. Afterward, she attended the MFA program at Rutgers University–Newark where she both studied and taught poetry.

== Career ==
In 2020, Luan won the Poetry Society of America Chapbook Fellowship, after which she published her poetry chapbook, I Watch the Boughs. Luan's manuscript had been selected by Gabrielle Calvocoressi.

In 2023, Luan published 回 / Return with Nightboat Books. It had won the 2022 Nightboat Poetry Prize. The Adroit Journal compared the book to M. NourbeSe Philip's "The Absence of Writing or How I Almost Became a Spy" and lauded Luan's "language, absence, and longing rupture against the linearity of time, finality of death, and limits of a life." Publishers Weekly called it a rich and vivid exploration of the Taiwanese American diaspora and said "Through recurring and interwoven motifs of memory, myth, and grief, Luan offers a subtle, engaging, and linguistically exciting reflection on language and place."

Luan was a 2020 Margins Fellow with the Asian American Writers' Workshop.

== Personal life ==
Luan is based in New York City.
