= Rebele =

Rebele is a surname of German origin. Notable people with the surname include:

- Brynne Rebele-Henry (born 1999), American author
- Hans Rebele (1943–2023), German footballer
