= K-Ming Chang =

American poet and novelist (born 1998)

- Born: 1998 (age 27–28)
- Notable work: Bestiary
- Awards: Lambda Literary Award for Lesbian Fiction (2023)
- Website: kmingchang.com

K-Ming Chang (traditional Chinese: 張欣明; simplified Chinese: 张欣明; pinyin: Zhāng Xīnmíng, born 1998) is an American novelist and poet. She is the author of the novel Bestiary (2020). Her short story collection Gods of Want won the 2023 Lambda Literary Award for Lesbian Fiction. In 2021, Bestiary was long-listed for the Center for Fiction First Novel Prize and the PEN/Faulkner Award for Fiction.

== Personal life ==
K-Ming Chang was born in 1998 and grew up in California. In elementary school, she wrote a story about a girl who turns into a tiger, which contained the seeds of her eventual first novel, Bestiary. Chang currently lives in New York.

== Writing ==
Chang was the editor of the Micro department at The Offing magazine from 2021 to 2024.

=== Past Lives, Future Bodies (2018) ===
Chang published Past Lives, Future Bodies in 2018 with Black Lawrence Press. The chapbook takes up themes of matrilineality contrasted with "volatile masculinity." In her review, Luiza Flynn-Goodlett praised the "magic conjured in this collection—lyric intensity coupled with sharp political intellect," saying "Chang emerges as an urgent, sumptuous voice, a poet of numerous gifts and intellectual dexterity." Several critics remark on Chang’s use of line breaks; in The Rumpus, torrin a. greathouse says "her chapbook is a master class in the potential of enjambment, imbuing each break with the wonder of and trepidation of the unknown."

=== Bestiary (2020) ===
Chang published her debut novel Bestiary in 2020. She wrote it during her sophomore year of college while she was at home on summer break, taking summer courses on Asian American history. In an Electric Literature interview, Chang said she "actually wrote Bestiary as a book of essays and was considering it as nonfiction when I was first drafting it." She sold Bestiary to One World, an imprint of Random House, while still an undergraduate. Another poetry collection was part of the book deal.

The novel tells the story of three generations of women, Daughter, Mother, and Grandmother, who move from Taiwan to Arkansas. After hearing Mother tell the folktale of Hu Gu Po, a tiger spirit who eats children to try to become human, Daughter grows a tiger tail and develops powers she doesn't understand. In a review for The New York Times, Amil Niazi contrasts Bestiary with immigrant literature organized around nostalgia and other sentimentality: instead, Bestiary is "full of magic realism that reaches down your throat, grabs hold of your guts and forces a slow reckoning with what it means to be a foreigner, a native, a mother, a daughter — and all the things in between." In a review for the Minnesota Star Tribune, May-Lee Chai says Chang’s novel “reinvents the genres of immigrant novel, queer coming-of-age story, and mother-and-daughter tale.”

=== Bone House (2021) ===
In 2021, Chang's micro-chapbook Bone House was released by Bull City Press as part of their Inch series. The collection is as a queer Taiwanese-American retelling of Wuthering Heights, in which an unnamed narrator moves into a butcher's mansion "with a life of its own."

=== Gods of Want (2022) ===
Chang published a short story collection, entitled Gods of Want, with One World in 2022. It won the 2023 Lambda Literary Award for Lesbian Fiction, and it was also put on The New York Times 100 Notable Books list for 2022. Alexandra Kleeman, writing for The New York Times, remarked of Chang's stories: "Each one is possessed of a powerful hunger, a drive to metabolize the recognizable features of a familiar world and transform them into something wilder, and achingly alive."

=== Organ Meats (2023) ===
In 2023, Chang published the novel Organ Meats with One World. The novel follows two best friends who, upon encountering stray dogs in their neighborhood, feel a strong desire to become dogs.

In an Electric Literature interview, Chang explained that her novels Bestiary, Gods of Want, and Organ Meats compose a "mythic triptych": "The narrators are people who have the future at their back and are looking into the past in a very speculative way."

=== Cecilia (2024) ===
Chang published the novella Cecilia in 2024 with Coffee House Press. A few weeks before its May 21 release, it was excerpted in Electric Literature and recommended by Brynne Rebele-Henry, who lauded Chang's work as "balancing desire with the abject, conveying the intensity of first love without the cliché." The book follows two girls who, as adults, reencounter one another for the first time since childhood in a chiropractor's office. An early excerpt that would later become Cecilia was first published in Hyphen in 2020.

=== Other work ===
Chang has published poetry in journals like The Adroit Journal and Muzzle Magazine. Her poetry was featured in Best New Poets 2018 and the 2019 Pushcart Prize anthology.

Chang has published a number of short stories, including "Haiyang", which was published in issue 41 of the Berkeley Fiction Review, as well as others published in Joyland, Electric Literature, and The Margins. Her short story, "Nine-Headed Birds 九头鸟", originally published in VIDA Review, was selected by Matthew Salesses for the 2020 Best of the Net anthology.

== Honors ==
In 2018, Chang was named a Gregory Djanikian Scholar in Poetry by The Adroit Journal. She has also been a Kundiman Fellow. In 2019, Chang's collection Past Lives, Future Bodies was a finalist for the Lambda Literary Award for Lesbian Poetry. In 2020, she was awarded the National Book Foundation's 5 Under 35 prize (selected Justin Torres). In 2021, her novel Bestiary was longlisted for the PEN/Faulkner Award for Fiction and the Center for Fiction First Novel Prize.
