= Luis Negrón =

Puerto Rican writer

- Born: 1970 (age 55–56); Guayama, Puerto Rico
- Occupation: Writer
- Writing career
- Period: 2000s-present
- Notable work: Mundo Cruel

Luis Negrón (born 1970 in Guayama, Puerto Rico) is a Puerto Rican writer.

Negrón originally studied journalism, which he said taught him how to write and gave him confidence. He lives in Santurce, a barrio in San Juan, and works in a bookstore.

His debut short story collection, Mundo Cruel, was published in 2010 and has seen five printings in Spanish. The stories in the book focus on gay life in Santurce. An English translation by Suzanne Jill Levine was published by Seven Stories Press in 2013, and won the Lambda Literary Award for Gay Fiction at the 26th Lambda Literary Awards in 2014.

He was also coeditor, with David Caleb Acevedo and Moisés Agosto, of Los otros cuerpos, an anthology of writing by LGBT Puerto Ricans. As of 2014, Negrón was working a novel, memoir, and play.

== Influences ==
Negrón has claimed filmmakers R. W. Fassbinder and John Waters as influences, as well as French writer Jean Genet and Argentinean author Manuel Puig.

== Works ==
- Los otros cuerpos: Antología de temática gay, lésbica y queer desde Puerto Rico y su diáspora. (2007, ISBN 0-9773612-8-4)
- Mundo Cruel (2010, ISBN 978-1596087798)
- Mundo Cruel: Stories, translated by Suzanne Jill Levine (2013, ISBN 978-1609804183)
- Los Tres Golpes, (2016, ISBN 978-0865817081)
