= Yongyu Chen =

American poet

- Born: Beijing, China
- Occupations: Poet and scholar

Academic background
- Education: Cornell University (BA); Harvard University
- Alma mater: Harvard University

Academic work
- Discipline: Film and Visual Studies
- Website: https://yongyuchen.site/

Yongyu Chen is a Chinese American writer and artist. They are the author of Perennial Counterpart (Nightboat Books, 2026), a winner of the 2023 Nightboat Poetry Prize. In 2023, they won Poetry Magazine's Friends of Literature Prize.

== Biography ==
Chen was born in Beijing, China. They grew up in Knoxville, Tennessee, and graduated from Farragut High School, where they competed on the quiz bowl team. As a high school student, they received early recognition for their poetry from The Poetry Society. They received their BA in comparative literature and Spanish from Cornell University.

Their debut poetry collection, Perennial Counterpart, is forthcoming from Nightboat Books. Noting its cinematic quality, Tracy K. Smith described the collection as a "generous, exquisite debut" and praised it for "the lyric conviction animating [Chen]'s work, and the ongoing dialogue—across time, lives, temperaments and texts—that gently yet adamantly stitches us to one another." It was selected as one of Literary Hub’s “Most Anticipated Books of 2026.”

Chen is currently a PhD student in Film and Visual Studies at Harvard University. Their scholarship focuses on "photography, queer theory, potentiality, & the ontology & ethics of worlds." In 2025, they were an ArtTable Fellow at the Public Art Fund. Their poems have appeared in The Paris Review, Poetry, and The Baffler.

== Honors and awards ==
- 2023: Poetry Magazine's Friends of Literature Prize
- 2025: Nightboat Poetry Prize
