= Tamiko Beyer =

Japanese American writer, editor, and activist

Tamiko Beyer is an American writer, editor, and activist. She is the author of several books, including Last Days, a poetry collection that won the Lambda Literary Award for Lesbian Poetry, and Poetry as Spellcasting, an anthology co-edited with Destiny Hemphill and Lisbeth White.

== Early life ==
Beyer spent the first 10 years of her life in Japan. There, she grew up with Buddhism and Shinto. As a child, she encountered poetry through her parents who read to her and also helped her "memorize Shakespeare soliloquies". Through her teenage years, when she lived in Seattle, she began writing her own poetry; her favorite poets back then were Adrienne Rich, Joy Harjo, Mitsuye Yamada, and Audre Lorde.

== Career ==
For several years, Beyer worked with the New York Writers Coalition as a volunteer facilitator who led workshops in prisons, hospitals, halfway houses, and other places. Beyer has also worked at Corporate Accountability, an organization that seeks to regulate and impose checks on transnational corporations and their activities, especially those about the environment. Additionally, Beyer was a poetry editor for Drunken Boat.

Since 2005, Beyer has been a Kundiman Fellow.

== Publications ==
Beyer's poems have appeared in Black Warrior Review, Poets.org, and others. Her reviews and essays have appeared in The Georgia Review, LitHub, and others. She also regularly publishes in a newsletter called Starlight and Strategy.

In 2011, Beyer published her first poetry chapbook called Bough Breaks with Meritage Press.

In 2013, Beyer published We Come Elemental, a poetry collection, with Alice James Books. It was a finalist for the Lambda Literary Award for Lesbian Poetry. The Rumpus called it "a series of intimate observations that human, and especially female, sexuality, lesbian sexuality, and the natural world are mysteriously intertwined."

In 2017, Beyer and poet Kimiko Hahn published Dovetail, a chapbook consisting of poems created from words shared in conversation between Beyer and Hahn. Published by Slapering Hol Press, it won the Slapering Hol Press Chapbook Competition.

In 2019, Beyer's poem-story, "Last Days, Part 1", won the PEN/Robert J. Dau Short Story Prize for Emerging Writers.

In 2021, Beyer released Last Days, a poetry collection, with Alice James Books. Beyer said it was written with "a poetic practice of radical imagination for our current political and environmental crises." It won the Lambda Literary Award for Lesbian Poetry and was a finalist for the Julie Suk Award. In a review of the book, The Adroit Journal lauded Beyer's poetic voice as an optimistic, imperative one.

In 2023, Beyer edited an anthology titled Poetry as Spellcasting with Destiny Hemphill and Lisbeth White, published by North Atlantic Books. A collection of essays, the book poses questions about poetry's relationship to social justice and sacred traditions.

== Personal life ==
Beyer is half-Japanese and half-white. She is a fourth-generation Japanese American and is queer.
