= Roya Marsh =

American poet

- Marsh at the Kelly Writers House in 2019
- Born: Parkchester, Bronx, New York City, U.S.
- Citizenship: United States
- Occupations: Slam poet, author
- Writing career
- Language: English
- Genre: Poetry
- Subjects: LGBTQ culture African-American culture

Roya Marsh is a LGBTQ African American slam and performance poet and activist.

Marsh, a native of Parkchester, Bronx, began her slam poetry career in the year 2011 while still a student and improving her skills at open mics.

Marsh is a former Poet in Residence at Urban Word NYC whose work has appeared in publications such as HuffPost and Nylon.

In 2025, Marsh published her second collection of poetry, savings time, that followed her first book of poetry, dayliGht, which received a nomination for the 2021 Lambda Literary Award for Poetry. savings time is nominated for the 2026 Lambda Literary Award for Poetry.

== Media ==
GLAAD has described Marsh as "A commanding voice in contemporary poetry, using her work to confront injustice, honor the complexities of identity, and illuminate the beauty and struggle of everyday life."
