= We Come Elemental =

2013 poetry collection by Tamiko Beyer

- Author: Tamiko Beyer
- Publisher: Alice James Books
- Publication date: May 21, 2013
- ISBN: 978-1938584008
- Preceded by: Bough Breaks
- Followed by: Dovetail

We Come Elemental is a 2013 poetry collection by Tamiko Beyer, published by Alice James Books. The book was a finalist for the Lambda Literary Award for Lesbian Poetry.

== Contents ==
In three parts, the book's poems tackle a myriad of topics ranging from the environment, body politics, gender and sexuality, and various modes of marginalization.

== Critical reception ==
The Rumpus called the book a "beautiful response" to the history of oppression against LGBTQ people, a history which has attempted to insist "that queer is somehow against the natural order." Instead, Beyer provides "a series of intimate observations that human, and especially female, sexuality, lesbian sexuality, and the natural world are mysteriously intertwined." The reviewer also observed the book's sensual, lyrical, and aesthetic qualities.

Lambda Literary similarly stated "With a lean, lyrical style, Beyer asks the reader to contemplate the connection between the natural world and ourselves; how water and mud and land intersect with identity and body and politics; and whether the lines we draw are as firm as we would have ourselves believe." The reviewer pointed out the book's "conversation between ecology and body" or what Beyer has coined as queer :: eco :: poetics, a paradigm which connects bodily concerns to environmental ones.

Hyphen called Beyer "an exciting new talent, a poet whose ability to mine seemingly infinite meanings from objects and ideas permits an exploration of the contradictory, paradoxical, and complicated nature of human existence." The reviewer applauded Beyer's creative, inventive use of natural imagery like water in order to make statements on gender, sexuality, and other bodily realms.

South 85 Journal paid attention to Beyer's diversity of styles shown ranging from lyric, word play, prose poetry, and others. Observing Beyer's construction of poetry around prescient issues of the environment, the reviewer stated, "Beyer does not simply speak to the passions of the young generation. She extends her influence to any reader who has the slightest tie to a place, a river, some natural area from their past."

Boxcar Poetry Review argued in favor of Beyer's urgent sense in her poetry which brings environmental issues to the forefront, "forcing readers to lean in, listen hard, and refuse to let go." Of the element of water, the reviewer stated "Beyer successfully transcends the conventional representations of water, such as baptism and cleansing by rain by connecting bodies of water to human bodies and focusing on water as an essential, physical element".
