= Gabrielle Bates =

American writer and visual artist

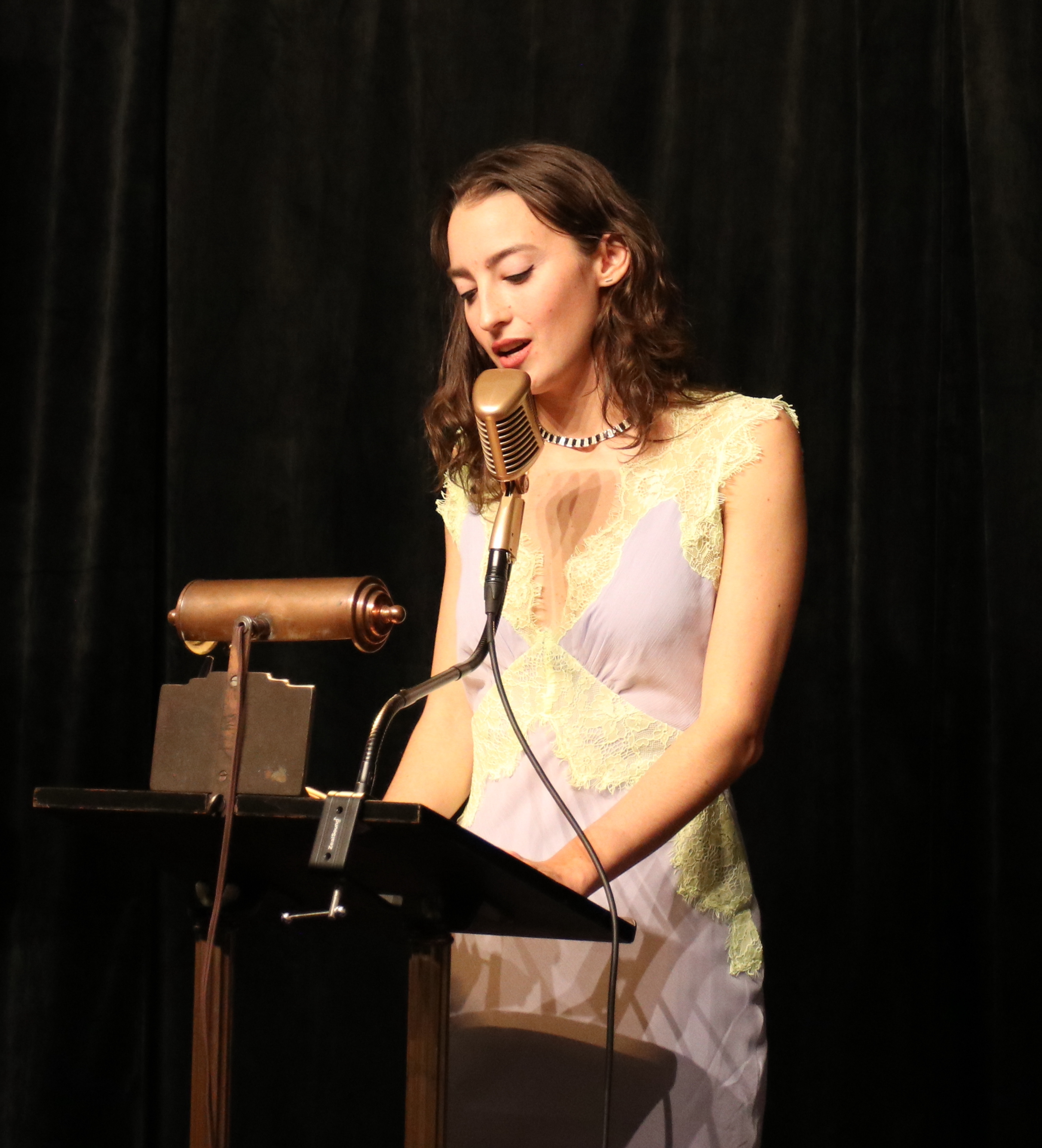
- Bates reading at an event in 2023
- Born: 1991 (age 34–35)
- Occupation: writer; tutor; visual artist
- Language: English
- Education: BA in English (creative writing), 2013; MFA in creative writing, 2016
- Alma mater: Auburn University; University of Washington
- Genre: poetry; visual art; creative nonfiction
- Notable works: Judas Goat "For Louise Glück"
- Notable awards: Washington State Book Award (finalist, 2024); Ruth Lilly and Dorothy Sargent Rosenberg Fellowship (finalist, 2022); The Gregory Djanikian Scholars Program (scholar, 2019)
- Spouse: Andrew Stahlman (m. 2014)

Website
- www.gabriellebat.es

Gabrielle Bates (born 1991) is an American writer and visual artist from Birmingham, Alabama, based in Seattle. Her debut poetry collection, Judas Goat (2023), was a finalist for the Washington State Book Award. The collection has been reviewed for its focus on human and nonhuman animal encounters.

== Life and education ==
Bates, who is a Scorpio, was born and raised in Birmingham, Alabama. She earned a BA in English (creative writing) from Auburn University in 2013 and an MFA in creative writing from the University of Washington in 2016.

Bates is the daughter of the professional photographer Liesa Cole. In 2014, she married Andrew Stahlman, whom she met while at Auburn.

== Career ==
Based in Seattle, Bates has worked for Open Books: A Poem Emporium as a social media manager and cohosts the podcast The Poet Salon with Lue Hughes and Dujie Tahat. She has taught through Hugo House, the Rosenbach Museum, Tin House Writers' Workshops, and the University of Washington Study Abroad Rome Program.

Her work has appeared in Poetry, Ploughshares, American Poetry Review, The New Yorker, Kenyon Review, The Rumpus, and elsewhere. She has received awards and scholarships including the Gregory Djanikian Scholarship in Poetry from The Adroit Journal in 2019. In 2022, she was a finalist for a Ruth Lilly and Dorothy Sargent Rosenberg Fellowship.

Judas Goat was published by Tin House in 2023. In The New York Times column "The Shortlist", Stephanie Burt discussed the collection's relationship to fairy tales. The book was also included in NPR's "Books We Love: Best Books of 2023". A UK and Ireland edition of Judas Goat was published by the87press in October 2025.

Before her debut collection, Bates published the chapbook This Afternoon We are All Arachnes as a limited-edition poetry-comic accordion booklet with Book Arts in 2017. Another chapbook, Before your bed was my bed / Antes de que tu cama fuese mi cama, was published as a bilingual edition translated by Bárbara Bianchi Ceballos in 2024.

In January 2025, her essay on Brigit Pegeen Kelly's collection Song (1995), titled "The Verberating World", was published as part of West Branch's "This Long Winding Line: A Poetry Retrospective", edited by Shara Lessley. As of 2025, Bates was also a visiting writer at the University of Tennessee, Knoxville.

=== Reception ===
At the AWP 2023 conference, Bates sold out copies of Judas Goat at the Brooklyn Poets booth on the first day. The collection was also included in Electric Literature's "Best Poetry Collections of 2023" and Book Riot's "12 of the Best Poetry Collections from 2023". BuzzFeed included it in a list of new and upcoming poetry collections and wrote that the book "wrestles with motherhood and memory and the unfixed boundaries of what makes a place — or a person — feel like home."

Writing in Only Poems, Andreea Ceplinschi said the poems focus "on fragility and forced transformations" following transformative events and praised the way the collection explores betrayal from multiple angles. Shannan Mann wrote that the collection leaves the reader "wanting to re-read". An Autostraddle review stated that "Bates writes with such precision it's almost ghastly." The book was also named a "Most-Anticipated Book of Winter" by Vulture.

Bates's poem "The Dog", the opening poem of Judas Goat, first appeared in The Offing in 2019 and later appeared in Poetry Daily. Reviewers described the poem as "stunning" and "gut-punching". Bates said the poem was "difficult" to place in the book, and the Mid-American Review blog called it "shocking" for "its unforgiving portrayal of the violence we cause." Writing for Only Poems, Ceplinschi called it "[t]he highlight of th[e] collection". Anthony Domestico described Bates as Brigit Pegeen Kelly's "poetic daughter" after reading Judas Goat. Writing for the Chicago Review of Books, Mandana Chaffa called the collection "a noteworthy debut, and confirmation of Bates's talent, heart and place in contemporary poetry."

The Dawn Review praised Bates's "ability to capture seemingly uncontrollable things", noting the book as "clenched like a fist around an egg."

== Books ==
- This Afternoon We are All Arachnes (Book Arts, 2017)
- Judas Goat (US: Tin House, 2023; UK: the87press, 2025)
- Before your bed was my bed / Antes de que tu cama fuese mi cama (bilingual edition; translated by Bárbara Bianchi Ceballos) (Desperate Literature, 2024)

== Awards ==
- 2015: Gigantic Sequins Poetry Comic Contest winner, for "As When Gone Wildabouting"
- 2019: The Gregory Djanikian Scholars Program (scholar)
- 2022: Ruth Lilly and Dorothy Sargent Rosenberg Fellowship (finalist)

== Fellowships ==
- 2014: Bucknell Seminar for Younger Poets Fellowship
- 2017: June Dodge Fellowship, Mineral School Artist Residency
- 2019: Jack Straw Writers Fellowship
