= Lue Hughes =

American poet and editor

- Born: 1991 (age 34–35)
- Education: Columbia College Chicago; Washington University in St. Louis
- Occupations: Poet; editor
- Writing career
- Genre: Poetry
- Notable work: A Shiver in the Leaves

Lue Hughes (born 1991) is an American poet and editor. She is the author of the poetry collection A Shiver in the Leaves (2022). Her honors include a 2020 Ruth Lilly and Dorothy Sargent Rosenberg Poetry Fellowship and the 2020 92Y Discovery Poetry Prize.

== Early life and education ==
Hughes was born in 1991 and grew up in the Seattle area. She was raised in Skyway and attended Renton High School. Hughes earned a BA from Columbia College Chicago and an MFA from Washington University in St. Louis. After completing her MFA in 2018, she returned to Seattle.

== Career ==
While at Columbia College Chicago, Hughes started the Shade Blog, which later became the Shade Journal and Shade Literary Arts, a literary platform for queer writers of color. She has worked as an editor for Columbia Poetry Review, Frontier Poetry, YesYes Books, and The Offing. She also co-hosts The Poet Salon podcast with Gabrielle Bates and Dujie Tahat.

Hughes's chapbook Touched was published by Sibling Rivalry Press in 2018. Reviews in RHINO and wildness discussed the chapbook's treatment of touch, trauma, and the body.

BOA Editions published Hughes's first full-length poetry collection, A Shiver in the Leaves, in 2022. South Seattle Emerald described the book as set in South Seattle and concerned with queerness, Blackness, love, and depression. The New Yorker reviewed the collection in its Briefly Noted column, writing that "brutality and tenderness" run through poems about desire, depression, family, faith, violence, nature, and the body.

In 2020, Hughes created the Queer Writers of Color Relief Fund. Seattle Magazine reported in 2025 that the fund had raised $55,500 for 215 queer artists of color.

== Awards and honors ==
- 2020: 92Y Discovery Poetry Prize
- 2020: Ruth Lilly and Dorothy Sargent Rosenberg Poetry Fellowship

== Works ==
- Touched (chapbook). Sibling Rivalry Press. 2018.
- A Shiver in the Leaves. BOA Editions. 2022. ISBN 978-1-950774-67-8.
