= Allegra Hyde =

American writer

Allegra Hyde is an American writer. She is originally from Peterborough, New Hampshire. She teaches creative writing at Smith College in Northampton, Massachusetts. She has also taught at Oberlin College and Warren Wilson College.

== Early life and education ==
Born in Peterborough, New Hampshire, Hyde graduated from ConVal Regional High School. She earned a Bachelor of Arts from Williams College and Master of Fine Arts from Arizona State University. At Williams College, Hyde studied with Jim Shepard. She received a Fulbright Grant to teach in English in Bulgaria.

== Career ==
During graduate school, she published a series of short stories titled Of This New World. The collection received a positive review in The Gazette. Hyde published her debut novel, Eleutheria, in 2022. The New Yorker named Eleutheria a best book of 2022 and it also received a positive review in the Los Angeles Times. It was also shortlisted for the First Novelist Award and featured on Late Night with Seth Meyers. Her short story collection The Last Catastrophe (2023) was a New York Times editors' choice selection.

Hyde's work has been awarded the Pushcart Prize four times and has appeared in The Best American Travel Writing and The Best American Short Stories.

Hyde's influences include Octavia Butler, Julie Otsuka, and Denis Johnson. Much of Hyde's work falls into the category of climate fiction.

== Publications ==
=== Books ===
- Eleutheria (2022)

=== Short fiction ===
- "Naples". North American Review. 299 (1). 29 Apr 2014.
- Hyde, Allegra (23 September 2014). "Bury Me". The Missouri Review. 37 (3): 50–60. doi:10.1353/mis.2014.0054.
- "The Touch". Hobart Pulp. 4 Dec 2013.
- "Acid". Gulf Coast. 26 (1). 2024.
- "Syndication". Nashville Review. 1 Dec 2014.
- "Issue 36". Passages North (36). 2015.
- Hyde, Allegra (2015). "Shark Fishing". New England Review. 35 (4): 83–100. doi:10.1353/ner.2015.0003.
- "Delight®". Black Warrior Review. 42 (2). 2016.
- "The Future Consequences of Present Actions" (PDF). The Gettysburg Review. 29 (1): 21–46.
- "Endangered". American Short Fiction. 4 May 2017.
- "Loving Homes for Lost & Broken Men". Kenyon Review (Sep/Oct 2017). 2017.
- "Adjustments". TriQuarterly (155). 14 Jan 2019.
- "Afterglow". Guernica. 14 May 2020.
- "Aphorisms for the Anthropocene". The New Yorker. 24 Jun 2022.
- "The Future Is a Click Away". BOMB. 21 Nov 2022.
- Hyde, Allegra (2023). "Democracy In America" (PDF). The Massachusetts Review. 64 (1): 80–100. doi:10.1353/mar.2023.0013.
- "Mobilization". Story (16). 2023.
- "Allegra Hyde". Conjunctions (Spring 2023). 2023.
- "Labor Pains". Harper's Magazine. No. 80. 2023.

=== Non-fiction ===
- "A Year in Reading". The Millions. 2022.
- "Somewhere Over the Rainbow: A Search for Transcendence & Annihilation in New Zealand's Hippie Paradise". The Rumpus. 11 Oct 2022.
- "What Makes a Great Opening Line?". Literary Hub. 9 Mar 2022.
- "8 Utopian Books for Dystopian Times". Electric Literature. 7 Mar 2022.
- "These Walls Won't Stop Talking". Poets & Writers. 14 April 2022.
- ""The Contagious Collective Epiphany": On Climate Change, Social Change, and the Right to Vote". Kenyon Review (Mar/Apr 2021).
- "Imagine All the People: The Case for Utopian Writing in the Age of Trump". Tin House. 19 Apr 2017.
- "Let The Devil Sing". The Threepenny Review (Spring 2017). 2017.
- "Lowry Hill". The Adroit Journal (19). 2017.
