= Nightboat Books =

American nonprofit literary press

- Founded: 2004; 22 years ago
- Founders: Kazim Ali and Jennifer Chapis
- Successor: Stephen Motika
- Country of origin: United States
- Headquarters location: Brooklyn, New York
- Distribution: Consortium Book Sales and Distribution
- Publication types: Books
- Official website: www.nightboat.org

Nightboat Books is an American nonprofit literary press founded in 2004 and located in Brooklyn, New York. The press publishes poetry, fiction, essays, translations, and intergenre books.

== History ==
The press was founded in 2004 by Kazim Ali and Jennifer Chapis. In 2007, Stephen Motika became publisher. Nightboat Books publishes manuscripts accepted through general submission and annually awards a $1,000 prize and publication for a book of poems.

Nightboat Books are distributed by Consortium Book Sales and Distribution. The press has received support from the National Endowment for the Arts, the New York State Council on the Arts, the Jerome Foundation, the Fund for Poetry, and the Topanga Fund.

Notable authors published by Nightboat Books include Dawn Lundy Martin, Joanne Kyger, Cole Swensen, Daniel Borzutzky, Wayne Koestenbaum, Etel Adnan, and Fanny Howe. Brian Blanchfield's book A Several World was the 2014 recipient of the James Laughlin Award and was long-listed for the 2014 National Book Award. Brandon Som's publication, The Tribute Horse, won the Kate Tufts Discovery Award for a debut book of poetry and was selected as a finalist for the 2015 PEN Center USA Literary Award for poetry. In 2013, Nightboat published Troubling the Line: Trans and Genderqueer Poetry and Poetics, the first comprehensive poetry collection by trans and genderqueer authors, which went on to be a finalist for the 2014 Lambda Literary Award in LGBT Anthologies.

== Notable books ==
- Andrea Abi-Karam and Kay Gabriel's We Want It All: An Anthology of Radical Trans Poetics
- Andrew Durbin's Skyland
- Bernadette Mayer's The Desires of Mothers to Please Others in Letters
- Bhanu Kapil's Ban en Banlieue
- Camille Roy's Honey Mine: Collected Stories
- Dawn Lundy Martin's Discipline
- Dodie Bellamy and Kevin Killian's Writers Who Love Too Much: New Narrative Writing 1977–1997
- Édouard Glissant's Sun of Consciousness
- Etel Adnan's Shifting the Silence
- Fanny Howe's Radical Love: Five Novels
- Herve Guibert's My Manservant and Me
- Jackie Wang's The Sunflower Cast a Spell to Save Us from the Void
- Kay Gabriel's A Queen in Bucks County
- Lou Sullivan, Ellis Martin, and Zach Ozm's We Both Laughed in Pleasure: The Selected Diaries of Lou Sullivan
- Martine Syms and Rocket Caleshu's The African Desperate
- Nathanaël's Pasolini’s Our
- Wayne Koestenbaum's Ultramarine, The Pink Trance Notebooks, and Ultramarine
- Emily Luan's 回 / Return
- Yongyu Chen's Perennial Counterpart
