= Marlon Bailey =

American academic

Marlon M. Bailey is a professor of African American Studies and Women, Gender and Sexuality Studies and an affiliate professor of theater and drama at Washington University in St. Louis. He previously taught at Arizona State University.

Bailey writes and researches in the area of African-American studies. He also has written about LGBT subcultures, and in particular topics which involve both subjects.

Bailey is also a director, actor, and performance artist. The most recent play that he acted in was in 2006, The Hard Evidence of existence: a Black Gay Sex (Love Show, directed by Cedric Brown. His most recent directing was in 2002 Blackness: Perspectives in Color in the Durham Studio, UC-Berkeley.

== Publications ==
- Butch Queens Up in Pumps: Gender, Performance, and Ballroom Culture in Detroit, ISBN 9780472071968 winner of the Alan Bray Memorial book prize. Bailey writes about ballroom culture in Detroit and its role in helping the Black LGBT community overcome the challenges of racism, AIDS, homophobia, and poverty.

=== Journal articles ===
- “Engendering Space: Ballroom Culture and the Spatial Practice of Possibility in Detroit”, Gender, Place and Culture: The Journal of Feminist Geography, 2013
- “Gender/Racial Realness: Theorizing the gender system in ballroom culture,” Race and Transgender Issues: A Special Issue Feminist Studies 37.2, 2011
- “Performance as Intervention: Ballroom Culture and the Politics of HIV/AIDS in Detroit,” Special Issue of Gender and Sexuality: Souls: a Critical Journal of Black Politics, Culture and Society, 2009
- “Reflections on a Conversation with Efua Sutherland: and Artist with a Vision,” Connecticut Review, Vol.XX.1, 1998

== Awards ==
- Winner of the Alan Bray Memorial Book Prize, 2015
- Finalist for the Lambda Literary Book Award in LGBT Studies 2014
- Co-Winner of the Modern Language Association/GLQ Caucus's Compton-Noll Prize for best article in LGBTQ Studies
