= Deborah Wheeler =

American politician

Member of New Hampshire House of Representatives for Merrimack 3
- In office 2014–2016

Member of New Hampshire House of Representatives for Merrimack 6
- In office 2006–2010

Personal details
- Born: May 17, 1945 Northfield, Vermont
- Died: May 28, 2025 (aged 80) Northfield, New Hampshire
- Party: Democratic

Deborah Wheeler (May 17, 1945 – May 28, 2025) was an American politician. She represented Merrimack County on the New Hampshire House of Representatives until 2016.
