= Ana Božičević =

Ana Božičević (born 1977) is a Croatian American poet. Her 2013 collection Rise in the Fall won a Lambda Literary Award for Lesbian Poetry.

== Biography ==
Ana Božičević was born in Zagreb, Croatia, then a part of Yugoslavia, in 1977. She grew up in the coastal city of Zadar.

In 1997, she immigrated to the United States, settling in New York City. There, she obtained a master's of fine arts from Hunter College. She then pursued further studies at the CUNY Graduate Center.

In 2009, Božičević published her debut full-length poetry collection, Stars of the Night Commute. The following year, it was a finalist for the Lambda Literary Award for Lesbian Poetry. Her second collection, Rise in the Fall, came in 2013, and it won the 2014 Lambda Literary Award for Lesbian Poetry. Her subsequent books of poetry include Joy of Missing Out (2017); Povratak lišća/Return of the Leaves (2020), published in Croatia; and New Life (2023).

Her work has been described as "full of wonder and surprise, even when grounded in the ordinary moments of everyday life," with a "21st-century lyricism". Frequent themes include queerness, migration, and technology.

Božičević has taught writing at various institutions including Baruch College. She has also worked as a translator. In 2012, she was awarded a grant from PEN America and the New York State Council on the Arts for her translation from Serbian of It Was Easy to Set the Snow on Fire by Zvonko Karanović.

== Selected works ==
- Stars of the Night Commute (2009)
- Rise in the Fall (2013)
- Joy of Missing Out (2017)
- Povratak lišća/Return of the Leaves (2020)
- New Life (2023)
