= David Caleb Acevedo =

Puerto Rican writer

- Born: July 13, 1980; San Juan, Puerto Rico
- Education: University of Puerto Rico at Río Piedras
- Occupations: Writer, poet
- Writing career
- Language: Spanish, English
- Genres: Poetry, short stories, novels, memoir
- Notable works: Historia del reguetón, Beyonce: voz de un ángel, Bad Bunny: música divina, el Reguetonero empedernido

David Caleb Acevedo (now known as Eiric R. Durandal Stormcrow) is a Puerto Rican writer. He was born on July 13, 1980 in San Juan, Puerto Rico.

He grew up in the Christian of Jehovah's Witnesses ministries, and renounced it at age 14. Acevedo is openly gay.

He completed higher studies at the University of Puerto Rico in Humacao, Ponce and Río Piedras (Puerto Rico). He received his double Bachelor of Arts in Painting and Foreign Languages from the University of Puerto Rico at Río Piedras.

== Works ==
- Historia del reguetón (poetry)
- Beyonce: voz de un ángel (poetry)
- Bad Bunny: música divina (poetry)
- From Pia Zadora to Rihanna: Why "Bad" Singers Are the Best (with Charlie Vázquez);
- Wanda Rolón conoce mi alma (short stories)
- Razones de mi celibato (short stories)
- Amores de telenovela (short stories)
- el Reguetonero empedernido (novel)
- Historias para admirar an Ashley (Yo Soy La Bomba) (novel)
- Diario de una monja humilde (memoir)
