= Stacy Szymaszek =

American poet, educator, and former arts administrator

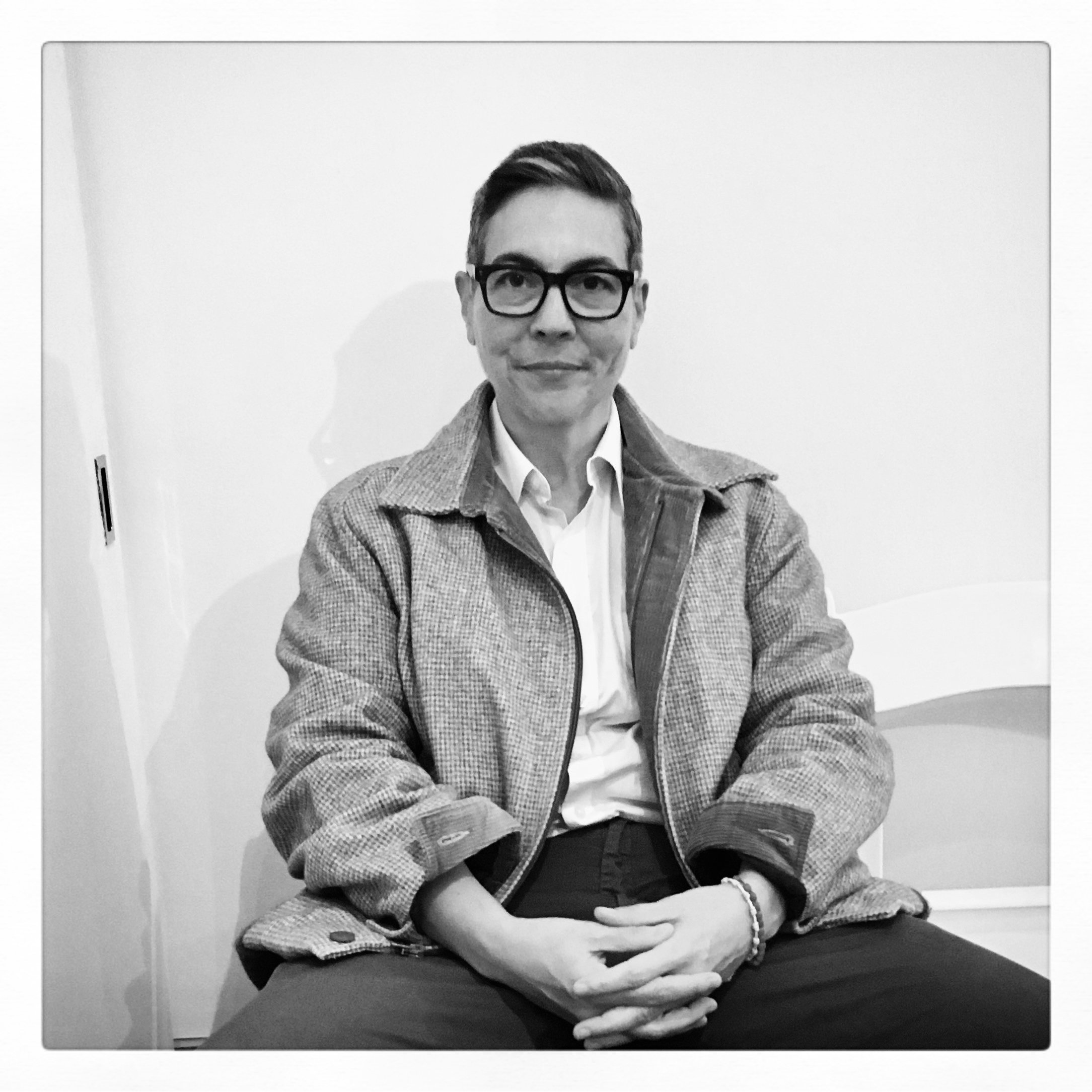
Stacy Szymaszek in 2017 after a reading for Ugly Duckling Presse on the Lower East Side, New York City

Stacy Szymaszek (born in Milwaukee, Wisconsin) is an American poet, professor, and former arts administrator. She was the executive director of the Poetry Project at St Mark's church in New York City from 2007 to 2018 and worked at Woodland Pattern Book Center in Milwaukee, WI from 1999 to 2005. She is the recipient of a 2014 New York Foundation for the Arts Fellowship in Poetry, a 2019 Foundation for Contemporary Arts grant in poetry, and a 2024 MacDowell Fellowship.

Szymaszek is the author of seven books: Famous Hermits (Archway Editions, 2023), The Pasolini Book (Golias Books, 2023), A Year from Today (Nightboat Books, 2018), hart island (Nightboat Books, 2015), Emptied of All Ships (Litmus Press, 2005) and Hyperglossia (Litmus Press, 2009), as well as Journal of Ugly Sites and Other Journals, which won the 2014 Ottoline Prize from Fence Books. Her books written between 2015 and 2019 comprise a trilogy of journal poems that record her experiences in New York City. Szymaszek's work favors the long form and takes influence from New York School poets in incorporating and engaging with the everyday. Szymaszek's poems, as writer Kay Gabriel points out, work with Frank O'Hara's "I do this, I do that" mode of writing through experience and location.

Szymaszek has also authored numerous chapbooks of poetry, including Three Novenas (auric press, 2023), The Hero Auden (Ugly Duckling Presse, 2017), austerity measures (Fewer and Further Press, 2012), Orizaba: A Voyage with Hart Crane (Faux Press, 2008), and Pasolini Poems (Cy Press, 2005). During her time in Milwaukee, she was the founder and editor of GAM, a free magazine featuring the work of poets living in the upper midwest.

Szymaszek earned a B.A. at University of Wisconsin–Milwaukee. She grew up in the Milwaukee area before moving around in her early twenties, including a summer at Kate Millett's farm in Poughkeepsie, NY. In 2018–2019, she was the Hugo Visiting Writer at the University of Montana.
