= Verónica Reyes =

American poet

- Born: 1968 (age 57–58); East Los Angeles, California, United States
- Education: California State University, Long Beach, University of Texas at El Paso
- Occupations: Poet, educator
- Writing career
- Period: Late 20th century – present
- Genre: Poetry
- Notable work: Chopper! Chopper! Poetry from Bordered Lives
- Notable awards: International Latino Book Award (2014), Golden Crown Literary Society Award (2014)

Verónica Reyes (born 1968) is a Chicana, Latina, LGBT poet from East Los Angeles, California. She is known for her book of poetry Chopper! Chopper! Poetry from Bordered Lives, which won her several awards. In 2014, she was honored with the International Latino Book Award and the Golden Crown Literary Society Award, and was also a finalist for the Lambda Literary Award for Lesbian Poetry. In 1999, she won the AWP Intro Journals Project award and was a finalist for the Andrés Montoya Poetry Prize.

== Early life and education ==
Reyes was born in the late 1960s to Natividad Avalos Reyes and Julia Socorro Hernández Reyes, "in the Maravilla area beneath the two jails and near the I-710 Freeway" in East Los Angeles, California. Reyes began writing at age 14, though she didn't know she was writing poetry. Her mother died when Reyes was 18, which she says "paved [her] road in life as a poet and educator."

Reyes was initially rejected from universities because her English-language scores were too low, though she eventually received help from the Educational Opportunity Program and passed the required language tests on her third try. She received a Bachelor of Arts from Long Beach State University in 1995 and a Master of Fine Arts in creative writing from the University of Texas at El Paso in 2000.

Though she presently lives in East Los Angeles, Reyes has lived in El Paso, Texas and Toronto.

== Career ==
Reyes has worked for El Paso Community College (Rio Grande and Valle Verde campuses), Humber College, Long Beach City College's Upward Bound program, and currently, California State University, Los Angeles

Reyes is a member of Mujeres Activas en Letras y Cambio Social and the Macondo Writers’ Workshop.

== Awards and honors ==
In 2014, Chopper! Chopper! won the 2014 International Latino Book Award and the Golden Crown Literary Society Award, and was a finalist for the Lambda Literary Award for Lesbian Poetry.

In 1999, Reyes won the AWP Intro Journals Project award and was a finalist for the Andrés Montoya Poetry Prize.

== Personal life ==
Reyes describes herself as a "Chicana feminist jota poet from East Los Angeles" and has stated,

I write for Mexicanos, Chicanas/os, for the next generation to see/read pieces that looked like us. That embodied us. I write to add the stories I know and understand and say this is us, the gente from North Sydney Drive. This was how we lived. We exist. We matter.

== Selected works ==
=== Books ===
- Chopper! Chopper! Poetry from Bordered Lives

=== Journals ===
Reyes's writing has been published in the following journals:

- New York Quarterly
- ZYZZYVA
- Calyx
- Feminist Studies
- Borderlands: Texas Poetry Review
- Canadian Woman Studies
- North American Review
- Pearl Magazine
- Rio Grande Review
- Sinister Wisdom
- Gay and Lesbian Review Worldwide
- The Minnesota Review
- Willow Springs

=== Selected Poems ===
- Desert Rain: An Anointment
- The Hawk
- Bad Flower
