= Suzanne Jill Levine =

American writer, poet, literary translator and scholar

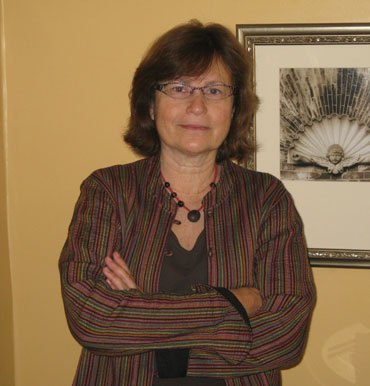
- Born: New York City, New York, USA
- Occupations: Writer, poet, literary translator, critic, scholar

Academic background
- Education: Vassar College (AB); Columbia University (MA); New York University (PhD)

Academic work
- Discipline: Latin American Literature; Translation studies

Suzanne Jill Levine is an American writer, poet, literary translator and scholar.

Levine was born in New York City where she studied piano at Juilliard and went to Music & Art High School.

She earned an AB at Vassar College in 1967, an MA at Columbia University in 1969, and a PhD at New York University in 1977. A scholar of Latin American literature, her books include one of the first studies of Gabriel García Márquez's One Hundred Years of Solitude and Adolfo Bioy Casares, both published in Spanish. She is also a leading specialist in Translation Studies and Comparative Literature. Her 1991 book, The Subversive Scribe, was influential on the development of translation theory in the United States and elsewhere. She has written two poetry chapbooks and hundreds of essays in major anthologies and journals. She is a translator of a range of writers including Silvina Ocampo, Clarice Lispector, Cecilia Vicuña, Jorge Luis Borges, Manuel Puig, Adolfo Bioy Casares, Carlos Fuentes, José Donoso, Julio Cortázar and Guillermo Cabrera Infante.

Levine is an honorary member of IAPTI. She has been recipient of numerous grants and awards from the National Endowment of the Arts (NEA) and for the Humanities (NEH).

== Awards (selection) ==
- PEN/Ralph Manheim Award for Translation for Career Commitment to Excellence
- PEN Center USA's Translation Award 2012
- John Simon Guggenheim Fellowship 1997
- PEN American Gregory Kolovakis Award in Hispanic Letters 1996
- Rockefeller Fellow, Villa Serbelloni Residency, Lake Como 1998

== Selected bibliography ==
=== Books ===
- El espejo hablado: un estudio de Cien años de soledad (1975)
- Guia de Adolfo Bioy Casares (1982)
- Manuel Puig and the Spider Woman: His Life and Fictions (Farrar Straus & Giroux, 2001; Faber & Faber, 2000; University of Wisconsin, 2001).
- The Subversive Scribe: Translating Latin American Fiction (Graywolf Press, 1991; Dalkey Archive, 2009).
- Unfaithful: A Translator's Memoir (Bloomsbury Publishing, 2025: ISBN 9798765133736)

=== Poems ===
- Reckoning (Finishing Line, 2012)

=== Translations ===
- Betrayed by Rita Hayworth, by Manuel Puig (Dutton, 1971; Avon Books; Random House; Dalkey Archive, 2009).
- Three Trapped Tigers, by Guillermo Cabrera Infante (trans. with Donald Gardner) (Harper & Row, 1971; Avon Books, 1985, Faber & Faber, 1990).
- Triple Cross, a volume of three novellas: Hell Has No Limits, by José Donoso; Holy Place, by Carlos Fuentes; From Cuba with a Song, by Severo Sarduy (1972).
- All Fires the Fire, short stories by Julio Cortázar (1973; Pantheon, 1988).
- Heartbreak Tango, by Manuel Puig (Dutton, 1973; Random House; Dalkey Archive, 2010).
- A Plan for Escape, by Adolfo Bioy Casares (Dutton, 1975; Graywolf Press, 1988).
- Cobra, by Severo Sarduy (Dutton, 1975; reissued by Dalkey Press, May 2025, ISBN 9781628975802)
- The Buenos Aires Affair, by Manuel Puig (Dutton, 1976; Random House, 1980; Faber & Faber, 1989; Dalkey Archive, 2010).
- Asleep in the Sun, by Adolfo Bioy Casares (Persea Books, 1978; Dutton, 1989).
- View of Dawn in the Tropics, by Guillermo Cabrera Infante (Harper & Row, 1978).
- A House in the Country, by José Donoso (trans. with David Pritchard) (Alfred A. Knopf, 1984; Random House, 1985).
- Infante’s Inferno, by Guillermo Cabrera Infante (Harper & Row, 1984; Avon Books; Faber & Faber, 1987).
- Maitreya, by Severo Sarduy (Ediciones del Norte, 1987).
- Adventures of a Photographer in La Plata, by Adolfo Bioy Casares (Dutton, 1989; Penguin; Bloomsbury).
- Larva, by Julián Ríos (trans. with Richard Alan Francis) (Dalkey Archive, 1990).
- Tropical Night Falling, by Manuel Puig (Simon & Schuster, 1991; Faber & Faber, 1992).
- Unravelling Words & the Weaving of Water, by Cecilia Vicuña (trans. with Eliot Weinberger) (Graywolf Press, 1991).
- A Russian Doll and Other Stories, by Adolfo Bioy Casares (New Directions, 1992).
- The Selected Stories of Adolfo Bioy Casares (New Directions, 1994).
- Christ on the Rue Jacob, by Severo Sarduy (trans. with Carol Maier) (Mercury House, 1995).
- Selected Non-Fictions by Jorge Luis Borges (edited by Eliot Weinberger; trans. with Esther Allen and Eliot Weinberger) (Viking, 1999).
- Beach Birds, by Severo Sarduy, (trans. with Carol Maier) (Otis Books/Seismicity Editions, 2007).
- The Lizard's Tale, by José Donoso (2011).
- Mundo Cruel: Stories, by Luis Negrón (2013).
- Where There’s Love, There’s Hate, by Silvina Ocampo (trans. with Jessica Powell) (Melville House, 2013).
- The Taiga Syndrome, by Cristina Rivera Garza (trans. with Aviva Kana) (Dorothy Project, 2018).
- The Promise, by Silvina Ocampo (trans. with Jessica Powell) (City Lights, 2019).
- Forgotten Journey, by Silvina Ocampo (trans. with Katie Lateef-Jan) (City Lights, 2019).
- Bezoar and Other Unsettling Stories, by Guadalupe Nettel (Seven Stories Press, 2020).
