= Arisa White =

American poet

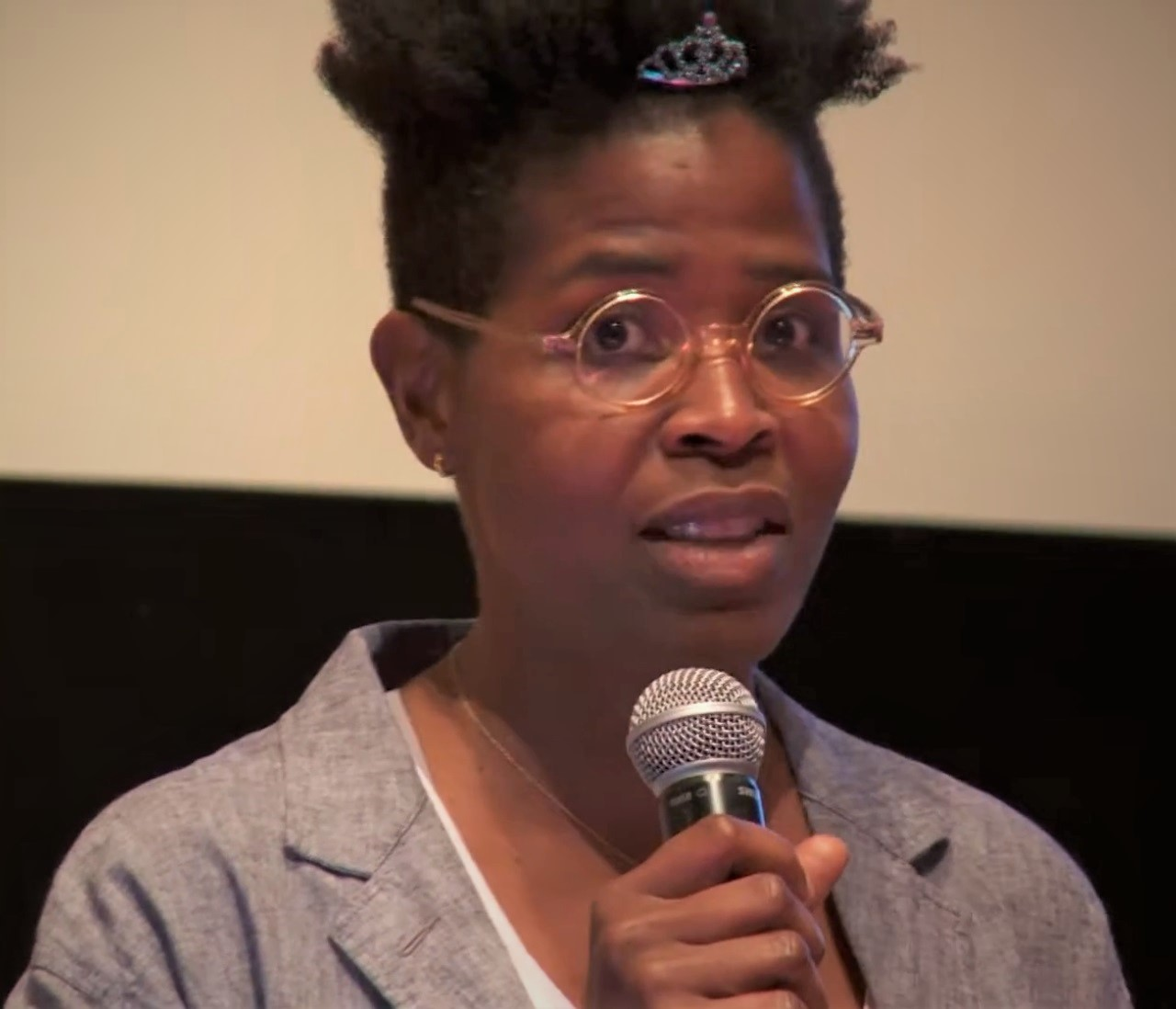
Arisa White

Arisa White is an American poet based in Oakland, California. She is a Cave Canem fellow and author of the poetry chapbooks Disposition for Shininess, Post Pardon, and Black Pearl, and the books Hurrah's Nest, A Penny Saved, and You're the Most Beautiful Thing That Happened.

== Background and education ==
Arisa White was born in Brooklyn, New York. She attended Sarah Lawrence College and received her MFA from the University of Massachusetts, Amherst.

== Work and awards ==
White's published works are books You're the Most Beautiful Thing That Happened (Augury Books, 2016), A Penny Saved (Aquarius Press/Willow Books, 2012), and Hurrah's Nest (Virtual Artists Collective, 2012); chapbooks Black Pearl (Nomadic Press, 2016), dear Gerald (self-published, 2015), Post Pardon (Mouthfeel Press, 2014), and Disposition for Shininess (Factory Hollow Press, 2008). Her work has appeared in anthologies Street Lit: Representing the Urban Landscape (Scarecrow Press, 2013); Another & Another: An Anthology From the Grind Daily Writing Series (Bull City Press, 2012); Cave Canem Anthology XII: Poems 2008-2009 (Willow Books, 2012); and The Woman I’ve Become: 37 Women Share Their Journeys from Toxic Relationships to Self Empowerment (Pixelita Press, 2012); Collective Brightness: LGBTIQ Poets on Faith, Religion & Spirituality (Sibling Rivalry Press, 2011); and Knocking at the Door: Poems for Approaching the Other (Birch Bench Press, 2011). Hurrah’s Nest was a finalist for the 2013 Wheatley Book Awards, 82nd California Book Awards, and nominated for a 44th NAACP Image Awards. You’re the Most Beautiful Thing That Happened was nominated for the 29th Lambda Literary Awards. Arisa's poetry was nominated for Pushcart Prizes in 2005, 2014, and 2016.
