= Alex Dimitrov =

American poet living in New York City

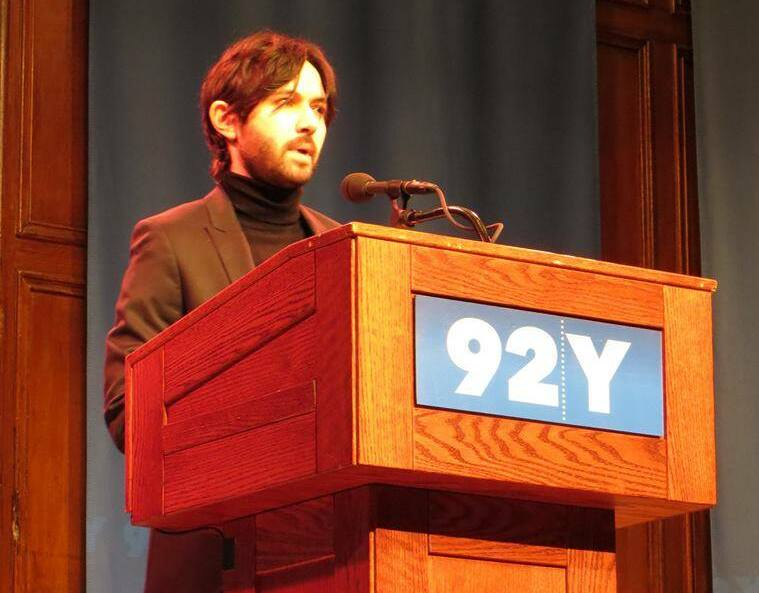
- Dimitrov reads at the 92nd Street Y

Alex Dimitrov (born November 30, 1984) is an American poet living in New York City.

== Early life ==
In 2009 he graduated from Sarah Lawrence College.

== Career ==
Dimitrov is the recipient of the Stanley Kunitz Prize from the American Poetry Review and a Pushcart Prize. He worked at the Academy of American Poets for eight years, where he was the Senior Content Editor and edited the popular online series Poem-a-Day and American Poets magazine.

He has taught writing at Princeton University, Columbia University, New York University, Barnard College, Sarah Lawrence College, Rutgers University in New Brunswick, Marymount Manhattan College, and Bennington College.

In June 2012 he published American Boys, an online chapbook from Floating Wolf Quarterly. His first book of poems, Begging for It, was published by Four Way Books in March 2013. His second book of poems, Together and by Ourselves, was published by Copper Canyon Press in April 2017.

Dimitrov published his third book, Love and Other Poems, in February 2021. The title poem, "Love," was published in the American Poetry Review in their January/February 2020 issue, which featured Dimitrov on the cover.

His poems have appeared in The New Yorker, The New York Times, The Paris Review, Poetry, The Yale Review, The Kenyon Review, American Poetry Review, Slate, Tin House, Boston Review, Poetry Daily, Verse Daily, and other publications.

In February 2014, Dimitrov launched Night Call, a multimedia poetry project through which he read poems to strangers in bed and online. Some of the components of the project included a video and a poem both titled Night Call.

On November 26, 2016, with the poet Dorothea Lasky, Dimitrov founded Astro Poets. Flatiron Books published their book, Astro Poets: Your Guides to the Zodiac in October 2019.

Dimitrov published his fifth book, Love and Other Poems, in 2021 which the New York Times book review talked of as a source of "impromptu shot(s) of delight".

=== Wilde Boys ===
On May 27, 2009, days after graduating from Sarah Lawrence College, Dimitrov founded Wilde Boys, a queer poetry salon that brought together emerging and established writers in New York City.

Dimitrov has also held salons focusing on the work of queer poets Joe Brainard, Tim Dlugos, Leland Hickman and Reginald Shepherd. A salon was also held in honor of Elizabeth Bishop, with special guests Richard Howard and Gabrielle Calvocoressi.

Wilde Boys ended on November 1, 2013.

== Bibliography ==
=== Poetry ===
Collections

- American Boys, 2012 (Floating Wolf Quarterly)
- Begging for It, 2013 (Four Way Books)
- Together and by Ourselves, 2017 (Copper Canyon Press)
- Love and Other Poems, 2021 (Copper Canyon Press)
- Ecstasy, 2025 (Knopf)

List of poems

Title	Year	First published	Reprinted/collected
The years	2022	Dimitrov, Alex (April 25 – May 2, 2022). "The years". The New Yorker. 98 (10): 51.	

=== Nonfiction ===
- Astro Poets: Your Guides to the Zodiac, with Dorothea Lasky, 2019 (Flatiron Books)
