= Robin Becker =

American poet and academic (born 1951)

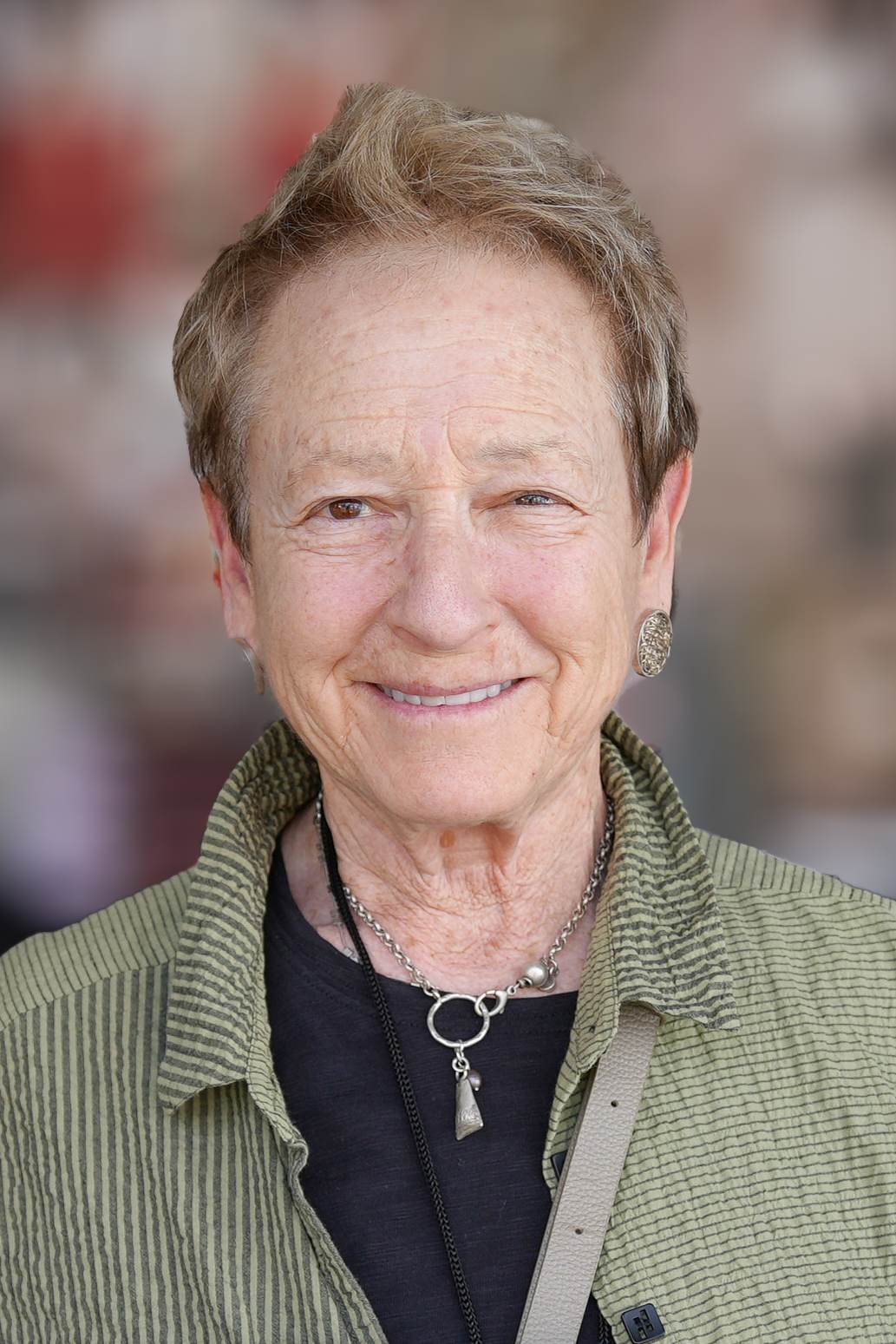
- Becker at the 2026 Tucson Festival of Books
- Born: 1951 (age 74–75); Philadelphia, Pennsylvania
- Education: Boston University
- Writing career
- Genre: Poetry

Robin Becker (born 1951) is an American poet, critic, feminist, and professor. She was born in Philadelphia, Pennsylvania, and is the author of seven collections of poetry, most recently, Tiger Heron and Domain of Perfect Affection (University of Pittsburgh Press, 2014 and 2006). Her All-American Girl (University of Pittsburgh Press), won the 1996 Lambda Literary Award in Poetry. Becker earned a B.A. in 1973 and an M.A. from Boston University in 1976. She lives in Boalsburg, Pennsylvania and spends her summers in southern New Hampshire.

== Teaching career ==
Becker taught for seventeen years at the Massachusetts Institute of Technology and is currently Professor of English and Women's Studies at Pennsylvania State University, where she has taught since 1993. She also teaches workshops such as those at the Summer Program Poetry Workshops at The Fine Arts Center in Provincetown, Massachusetts.

== Literary influences and praise ==
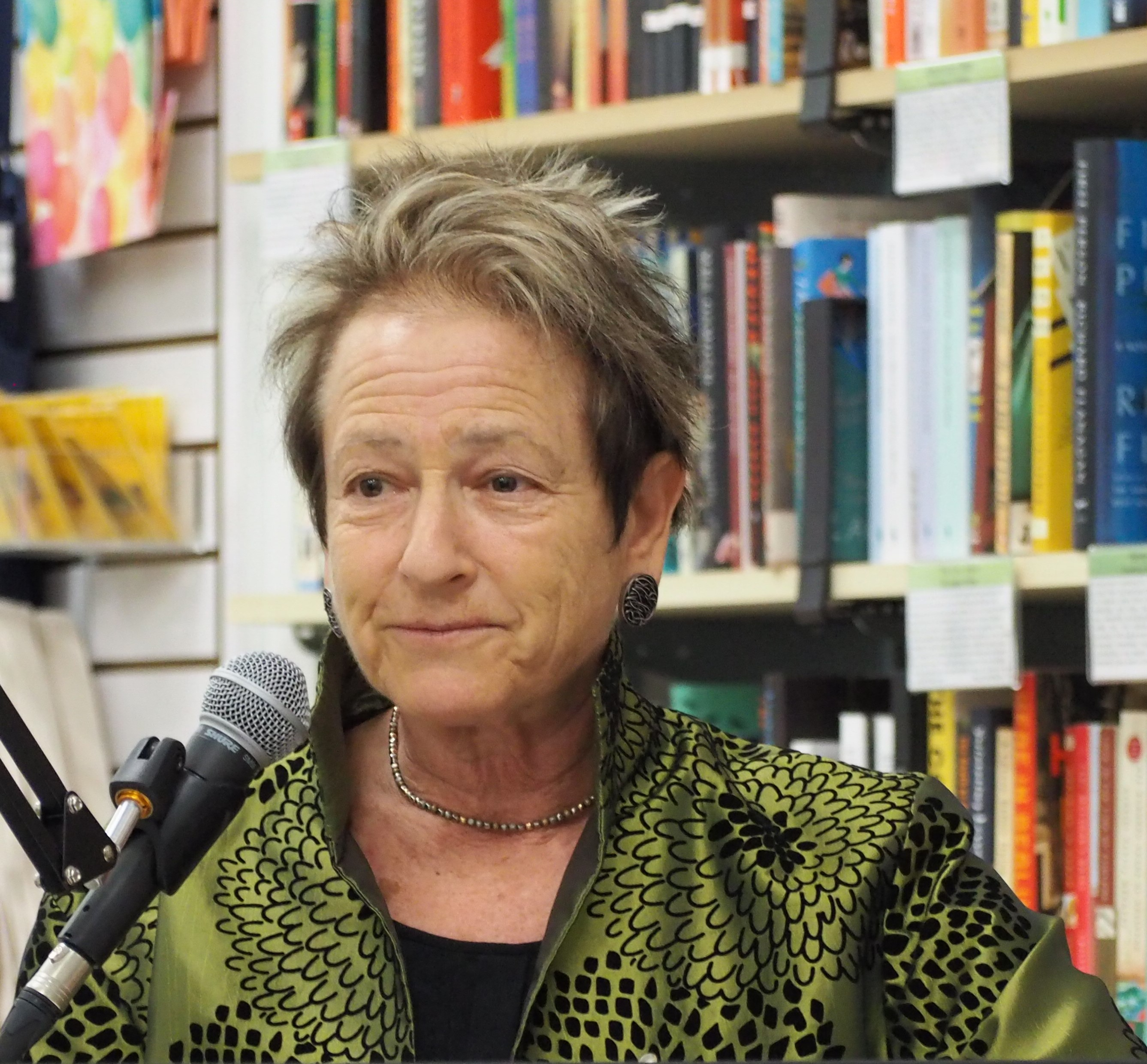
Becker in 2018

"Becker grew up listening to her grandmother's stories, learning from her the nuances of storytelling and her family's history in Ukraine. Becker was also greatly influenced by the women writers whose poetry was available in the 1970s, including Adrienne Rich, Audre Lorde, Maxine Kumin, Denise Levertov, and Susan Griffin. "

Her first two books were published by Alice James Books, the first in 1977, Personal Effects (a three-poet anthology, including Robin Becker, Helena Minton and Marilyn Zuckerman), which makes her one of the earliest cooperative members of the press, which was founded in 1973, so it seems fitting that Ed Ochester has said that "Robin is one of the most varied of the poets on the Pitt list in her style and subject matter--and the foremost feminist poet of her generation."

In her biography of Robin Becker, Heidi Ogrodnek writes, "She is known for her work in Lesbian and Gay Studies and served as a visiting scholar at the Center for Lesbian and Gay studies at the CUNY in 1998. She has said, 'Feminist scholarship and gay and lesbian poetry have provided me with the tools with which to work.' Her collections of poetry develop precise, delicate imagery and… depict her own transition from girlhood to womanhood… Maxine Kumin has also been a tremendous inspiration to Becker...[she] learned that 'woman poets could celebrate their lives and not position themselves as victims in every story.' "

Her poems, essays, and book reviews have appeared in publications including Slate The American Poetry Review, The Boston Globe, Gettysburg Review, AGNI, Ploughshares, Kenyon Review, Prairie Schooner, The New Yorker, and The Best American Poetry 2008. She has published book reviews in many venues, and writes a column on contemporary poetry called Field Notes for the Women's Review of Books, where she serves as Contributing and Poetry Editor. Her honors include fellowships from The Center for Lesbian and Gay Studies of the City University of New York, The William Steeple Davis Foundation, the Mary Bunting Institute of Radcliffe College, and the Massachusetts Artists Foundation.

== Published works ==
=== Full-length collections ===
- The Black Bear Inside Me University of Pittsburgh Press, 2018. ISBN 9780822965244, OCLC 1007925036
- Tiger Heron, University of Pittsburgh Press, 2014. ISBN 9780822962984, OCLC 863789745
- Domain of Perfect Affection, University of Pittsburgh Press, 2006. ISBN 9780822959311, OCLC 836512302
- The Horse Fair University of Pittsburgh Press, 2000. ISBN 9780822957201, OCLC 248392704
- All-American Girl (University of Pittsburgh Press, 1996)
- Giacometti's Dog University of Pittsburgh Press, 1990. ISBN 9780822936367, OCLC 246911199
- Backtalk, Alice James Books, 1982. ISBN 9780914086369, OCLC 24055332
- Personal Effects Alice James Books, 1977. ISBN 9780914086154, OCLC 2847282

=== Chapbooks ===
- Venetian Blue, Frick Art Museum, 2002. ISBN 9780970342522, OCLC 51310528

== Awards ==
- 1997: Virginia Faulkner Prize for Excellence in Writing from Prairie Schooner
- 1996: Lambda Literary Award in Lesbian Poetry
- 1989: National Endowment for the Arts - Literature Fellowship in Poetry

== See also ==
- Lesbian Poetry

== Sources ==
- The Academy of American Poets > Robin Becker
- PENN State > Pennsylvania Center for the Book > Robin Becker Biography > Prepared by Heidi Ogrodnek, Spring 2005
- PENN State Department of English > Faculty > Robin Becker
- WGBH Forum Network: Meet the Poet: Robin Becker
- The Poetry Center at Smith College > Robin Becker
- Library of Congress Online Catalog
