= Roberta Degnore =

American author

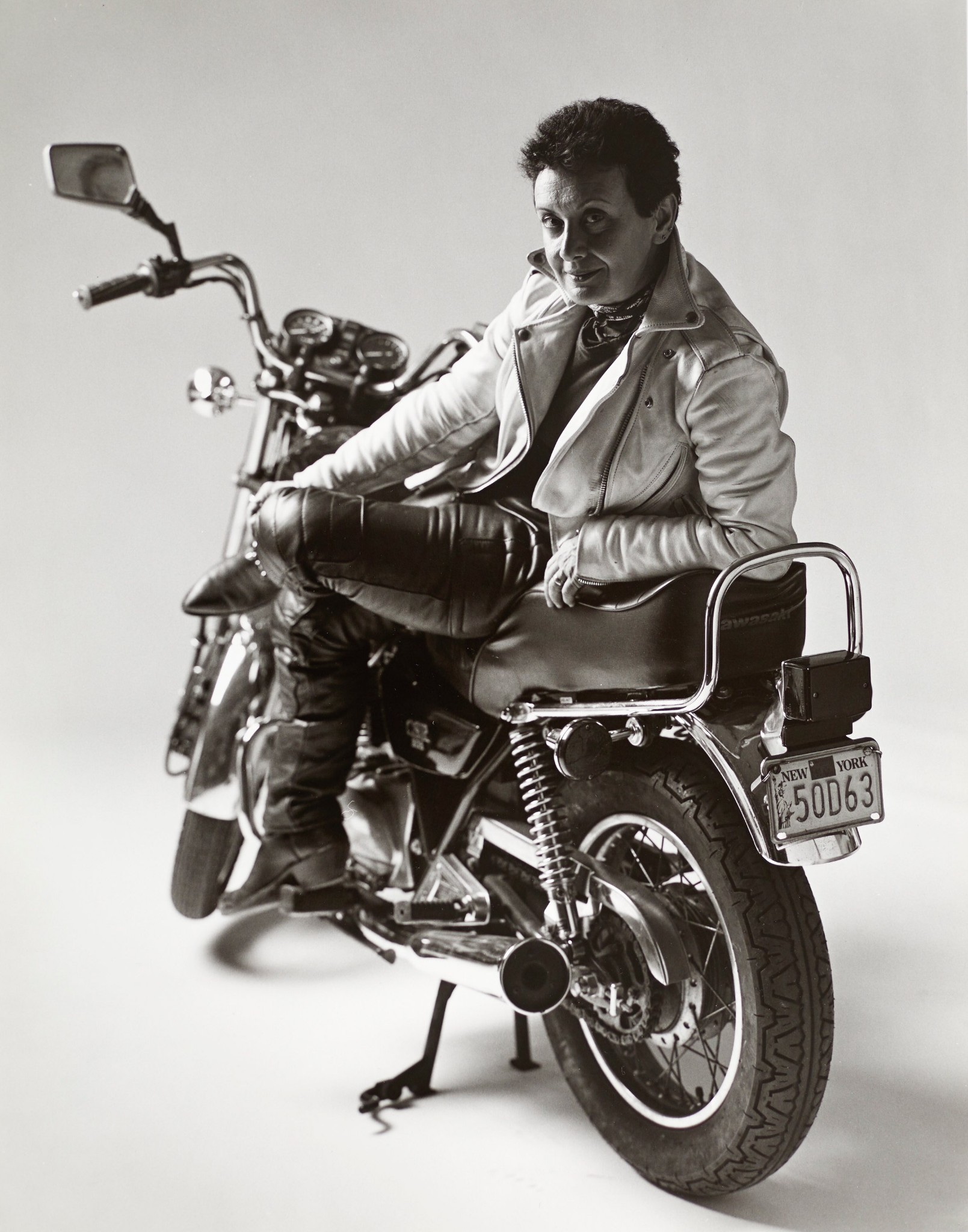
- Roberta Degnore, 1990
- Born: 1946 (age 79–80); Detroit, Michigan
- Education: Wayne State University, City University of New York
- Occupations: novelist; filmmaker; psychologist; professor
- Writing career
- Pen name: Carolyn Chase; Roslyn Dane; Rochel De Noreé; Roberta Dennis; Rachel Desmond
- Years active: 1977-
- Genres: romance; historical romance; science fiction; LGBTQ
- Notable works: Invisible Soft Return:\, 2013
- Notable awards: Finalist Lambda Literary Awards 2014
- Website: <www.robertadegnore.com

Roberta Degnore (born July 1946) is an American author, filmmaker, and psychologist. Degnore wrote novels under numerous pen names before pursuing graduate studies in psychology and filmmaking.

Degnore was a close friend and confidant to art curator and photography collector Sam Wagstaff at the time of his death from AIDS in 1987.

She currently teaches courses in psychology at the Fashion Institute of Technology. Her works include Invisible Soft Return:\, nominated for the Lambda Literary Award in 2014.

== Growing up outside Detroit ==
Degnore grew up in what she recalled as the "desperately middle class" suburbs of Detroit, just north of Eight Mile Road, with her mother and father, while her older brother, for reasons unknown to Degnore, lived not far away with their grandparents. Degnore fondly recalls her cousin, Joe Groppusso, who was about a decade older than Degnore and acted as a childhood protector and early artistic and cultural influence.

She attended Wayne State University where she received a Bachelor of Arts as well as a Master of Arts in psychology.

After her mother's discovery that Degnore was a lesbian, Degnore left Detroit for New York City.

== Early years in New York ==
Degnore arrived in New York City in 1980. With two other artists, she converted a 1500 square foot commercial loft in the Bowery District. "It was all focused on the art scene," Degnore later told a reporter. "No one had money back then. Everyone was just doing art because they loved it, and we gave each other respect because of that." In the ensuing decades, the neighborhood had changed due to gentrification, and the building's owner sought to buy out the tenants and sell the building. When he did so in 2008, he told Degnore to get ready to leave but she resisted, and was the last tenant to vacate.

Degnore says Richard Curtis was her agent when she began writing for a living: "great beginning, great mentor," she recalled.

== Writing books to pay for graduate school ==
Degnore wrote numerous novels using pseudonyms, including The Real Connection, an "as told to" autobiography of French entertainer and heroin smuggler Edmond Taillet, which was published under the pen name Rachel Desmond.

Some of her genre fiction, originally published under pseudonyms, is now available under her real name, including such romance and historical romance titles as Stuck Up, Gold Digger, and Until You See Me.

Other titles Degnore published under pseudonyms include Renegade Hearts, Between the Lines, and A Woman of New Orleans.

Degnore explains on her website that she wrote the books to pay for graduate school as she sought her doctorate in psychology, and used pseudonyms to keep her careers separate.

Degnore's early practice of psychology involved "working with artists in specialized creative block therapy". In 1987, Degnore received her doctorate in psychology from the Graduate Center at the City University of New York. She now works in the Department of Social Sciences at the Fashion Institute of Technology, teaching a course in fashion choices and gender expression, and conducting research in positive psychology, social psychology and applied psychology with a current focus on gender expression and perception in fashion.

Degnore also holds a Master of Fine Arts in screenwriting from the University of California at Los Angeles.

== Friendship with Sam Wagstaff ==
Degnore met photography collector and art curator Sam Wagstaff while she was working on her dissertation for her PhD in psychology at the City University of New York. Her artist girlfriend had taken her to his apartment and bid her not talk to "the great man", but while her girlfriend fell into conversation with Robert Mapplethorpe, Degnore and Wagstaff bonded. In spite of the difference in their ages and socio-economic backgrounds, Degnore soon became his confidant. "I shouldn't have fit into Sam's world," Degnore remembered. "But we were obstinately and ruinously close...until AIDS murdered him in 1987."

When Wagstaff died of AIDS, Degnore was entrusted with destroying a cache of Wagstaff's intimate photos, including some taken by Mapplethorpe.

When Degnore completed her doctorate in 1987, she dedicated her dissertation to Wagstaff.

Degnore read an excerpt of her memoirs about her friendship with Wagstaff at the 2019 Rainbow Book Fair in New York City.

== Later novels and short films ==
In 1989, under the pseudonym Roslyn Dane, Degnore published The Assistance of Vice, a novel about the downtown New York dyke scene in the years before AIDS that she later described in autobiographical terms. In 2004, Degnore made a short film called F*Stop based on the novel. Degnore's other film writing and directing credits include HairZ (2009), and Heatbeat (1993).

In 2013, Degnore published Invisible Soft Return:\, a feminist science fiction novel that was named as a finalist in the science fiction category of the 26th Annual Lambda Literary Awards.
