= Brynne Rebele-Henry =

American writer

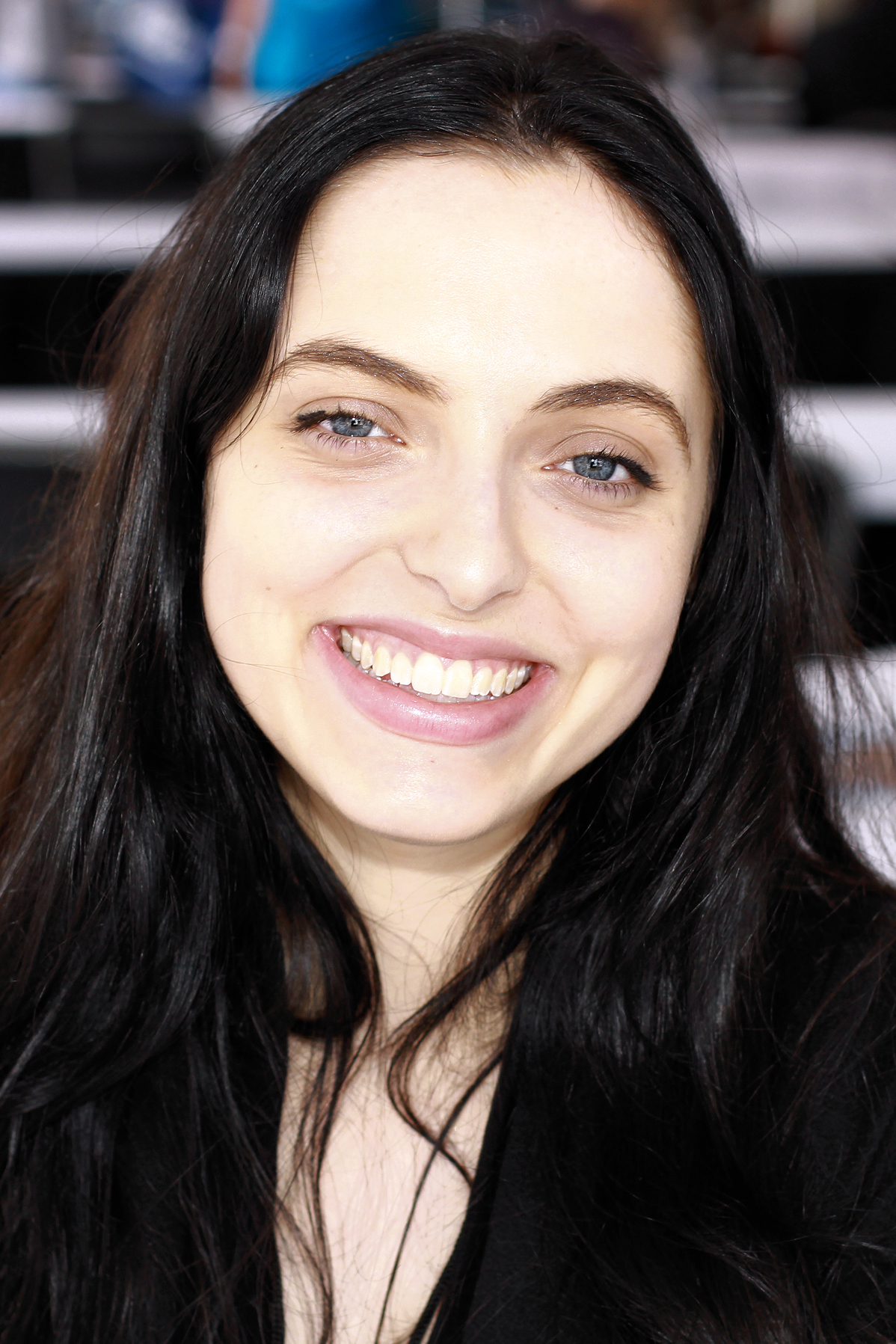
Rebele-Henry at the 2019 Texas Book Festival

Brynne Rebele-Henry (born November 1999) is an American writer of fiction, poetry, and nonfiction.

In 2016, Rebele-Henry published her first book, Fleshgraphs, with Nightboat Books. Her second book, Autobiography of a Wound, won the 2017 AWP Donald Hall Prize. She has received a 2017 Glenna Ruschei Award from Prairie Schooner for her story "The Small Elf People," the 2015 Louise Louis/Emily F. Bourne Poetry Award from the Poetry Society of America for her poem "Narwhal," and the 2016 Adroit Prize for Prose for an excerpt of her novel The Glass House.

Rebele-Henry's debut novel, Orpheus Girl, was published by Soho Press in October 2019. Her 2022 poetry collection, Prelude, was published by the University of Pittsburgh Press and was a finalist for the 2023 Lambda Literary Award for Lesbian Poetry.

Her work centers around topics like feminism, lesbianism, homophobic violence, and girlhood.

Her writing has appeared in Denver Quarterly, Dusie, Fiction International, jubilat, The Adroit Journal, and Rookie.

== Publications ==
- Fleshgraphs (New York: Nightboat Books, 2016)
- Autobiography of a Wound (Pittsburgh: University of Pittsburgh Press, 2018)
- Orpheus Girl (Soho Teen, 2021)
- Prelude (Pittsburgh: University of Pittsburgh Press, 2022)
