= Dawn Lundy Martin =

American poet and essayist

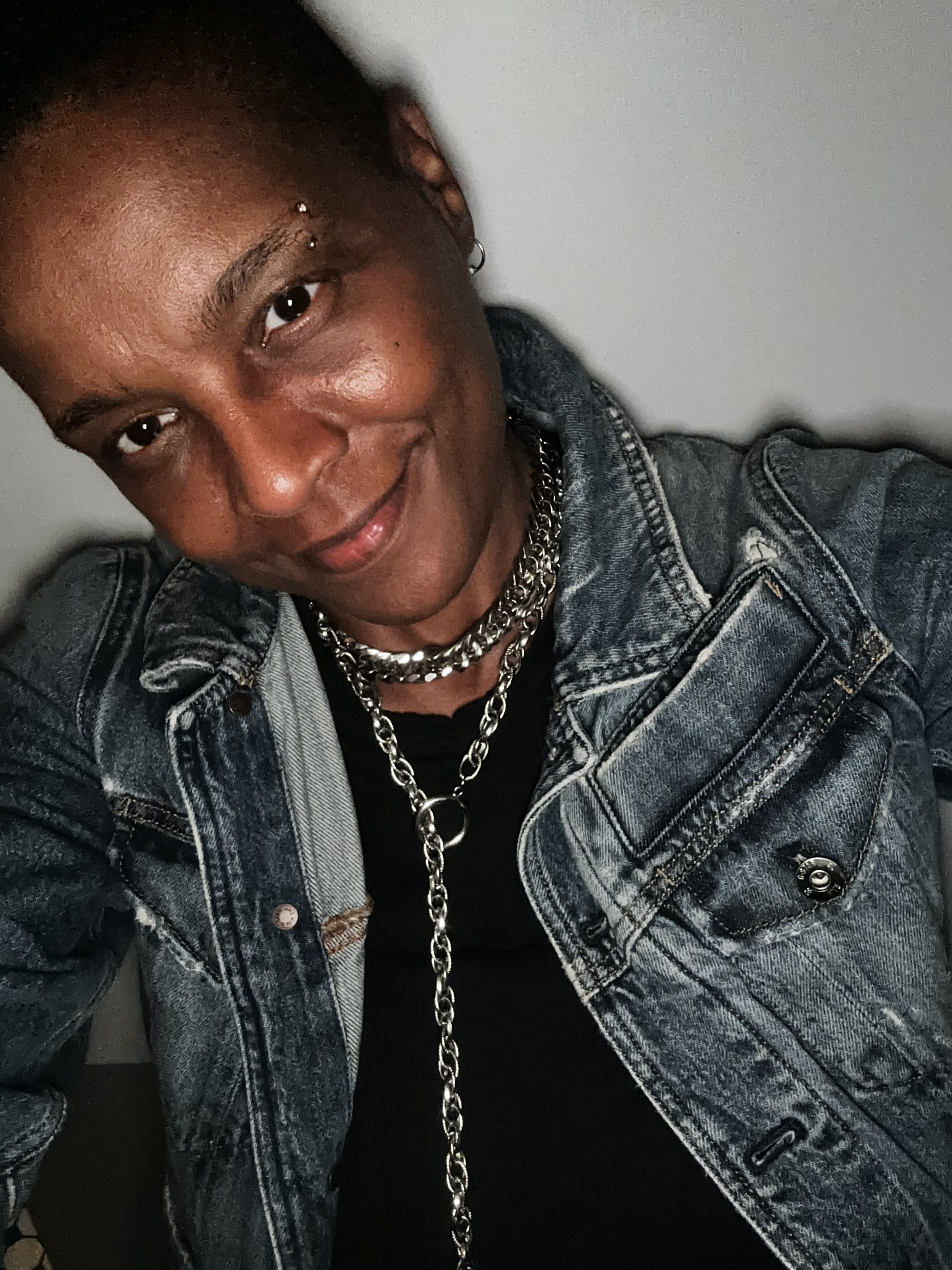
- Martin in Brooklyn, 2024
- Education: University of Connecticut (BA); San Francisco State University (MA); University of Massachusetts Amherst (PhD)
- Occupations: Poet; essayist; educator
- Writing career
- Notable works: Life in a Box Is a Pretty Life; Good Stock Strange Blood; Instructions for The Lovers
- Notable awards: Lambda Literary Award for Lesbian Poetry; Kingsley Tufts Poetry Award

Dawn Lundy Martin is an American poet and essayist. She is the author of the poetry collections A Gathering of Matter / A Matter of Gathering (2007), Discipline (2011), Life in a Box Is a Pretty Life (2015), Good Stock Strange Blood (2017), and Instructions for The Lovers (2024). Life in a Box Is a Pretty Life won the Lambda Literary Award for Lesbian Poetry, and Good Stock Strange Blood won the Kingsley Tufts Poetry Award. Instructions for The Lovers was a finalist for the 2024 National Book Critics Circle Award in poetry.

== Education and career ==
Martin earned a BA from the University of Connecticut, an MA in creative writing from San Francisco State University, and a PhD in English from the University of Massachusetts Amherst. She has taught at Montclair State University, The New School, the University of Pittsburgh, and Bard College.

Martin coedited, with Vivien Labaton, The Fire This Time: Young Activists and the New Feminism (2004), and she co-founded the Third Wave Foundation. At the University of Pittsburgh, she helped found the Center for African American Poetry and Poetics, which emerged from a 2015 planning session involving Martin, Terrance Hayes, and Yona Harvey. She is Distinguished Writer in Residence at Bard College.

Martin received the 2008 May Sarton Prize for Poetry from the American Academy of Arts and Sciences, a 2018 National Endowment for the Arts Literature Fellowship in prose, and a 2022 United States Artists Fellowship.

== Reception ==
Martin's first full-length collection, A Gathering of Matter / A Matter of Gathering, was selected by Carl Phillips for the Cave Canem Poetry Prize. Discipline was chosen by Fanny Howe for the Nightboat Books Poetry Prize.

Reviewing Life in a Box Is a Pretty Life for Ploughshares, Paul Scott Stanfield wrote that Martin's earlier books were marked by formal risk and that the collection continued that experimentation through its treatment of confinement—"a circumstance that occurs throughout her text"—and race.

In Full Stop, Aja Couchois Duncan described Good Stock Strange Blood as a work concerned with systemic racism, intergenerational trauma, and the possibility of survival through language. Reviewing Instructions for The Lovers, Evangeline Riddiford Graham wrote in Full Stop that the book reworks questions of language and knowledge, while a review in The Rumpus discussed its treatment of queer love and polyamory.

== Selected works ==
=== Poetry collections ===
- A Gathering of Matter / A Matter of Gathering (University of Georgia Press, 2007). ISBN 9780820329918
- Discipline (Nightboat Books, 2011). ISBN 9780984459841
- Life in a Box Is a Pretty Life (Nightboat Books, 2015). ISBN 9781937658281; OCLC 900011127
- Good Stock Strange Blood (Coffee House Press, 2017). ISBN 9781566894715; OCLC 959038074
- Instructions for The Lovers (Nightboat Books, 2024). ISBN 9781643622316

=== Chapbooks ===
- The Morning Hour (Poetry Society of America, 2003).
- The Undress (Belladonna*).
- Candy (Albion Books, 2011).

=== Edited volumes ===
- The Fire This Time: Young Activists and the New Feminism (with Vivien Labaton, Anchor Books, 2004)
- Letters to the Future: BLACK WOMEN / Radical WRITING (with Erica Hunt, Kore Press, 2018)
