= Syd Zolf =

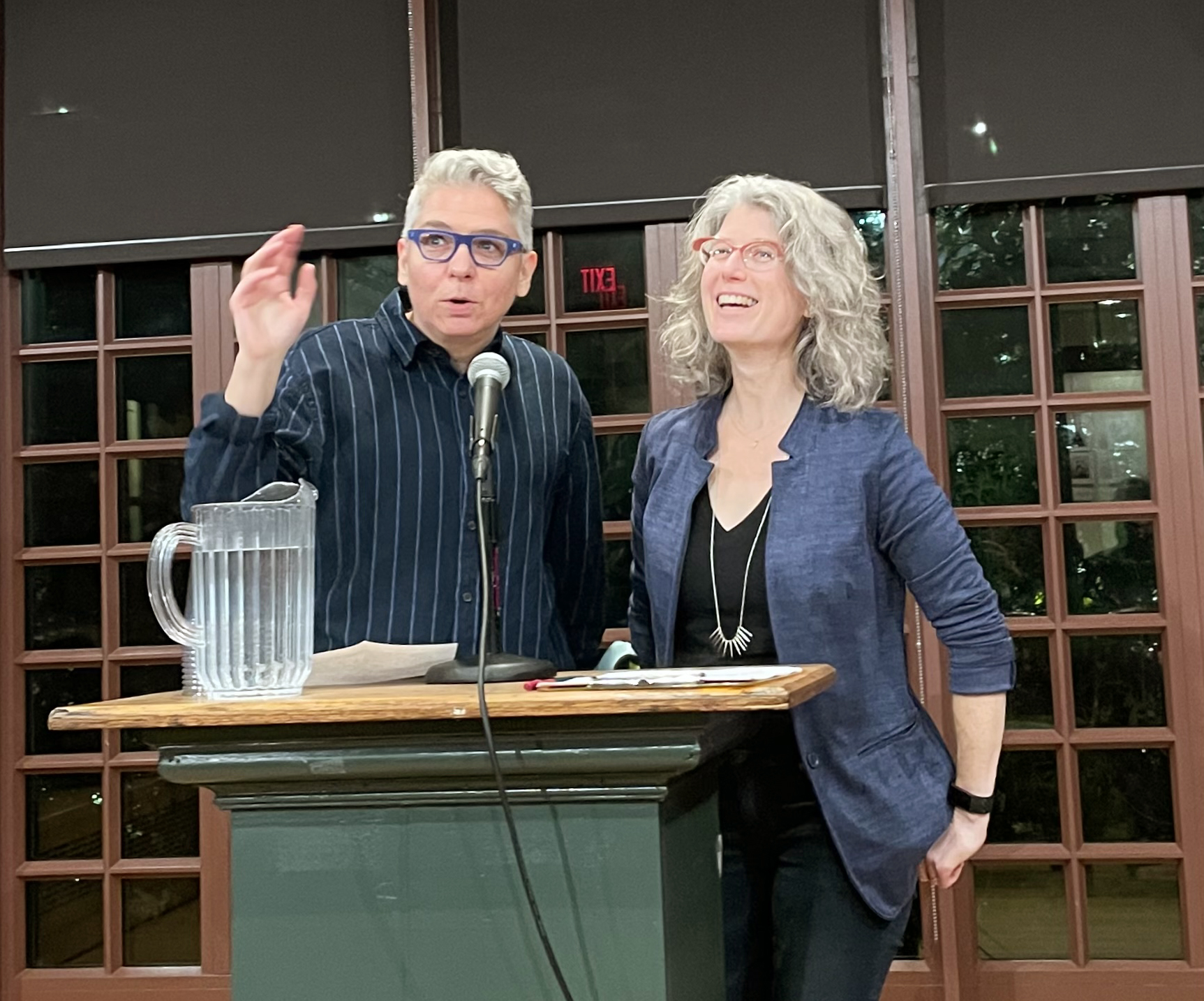
Syd Zolf (left) and Julia Bloch at Kelly Writers House. Photo by Mehrin Masud-Elias

Syd Zolf (born December 14, 1968), formerly known as Rachel Zolf, is a Canadian-American poet and theorist. They are the author of five poetry collections: Janey's Arcadia(2014), which was nominated for a Lambda Literary Award, a Raymond Souster Memorial Award, and a Vine Award; Neighbour Procedure(2010); Human Resources(2007), which won the 2008 Trillium Book Award for Poetry and was a finalist for the Lambda Literary Award; Masque(2004), which was shortlisted for the 2005 Trillium Book Award for Poetry; and Her absence, this wanderer(1999), the title poem of which was a finalist in the CBC Literary Competition. A selected poetry, Social Poesis: The Poetry of Rachel Zolf, was published in 2019. A work of poetics/theory, No One's Witness: A Monstrous Poetics, in 2021 and was a finalist for the 2022 Pegasus Award for Poetry Criticism from the Poetry Foundation. They received a Pew Fellowship in the Arts in 2018.

Zolf's art video translation of three poems from Janey’s Arcadia has shown at the International Film Festival Rotterdam, the Vancouver Art Gallery, the Dunlop Art Gallery and other venues. Among their many collaborations, Zolf wrote the film The Light Club of Vizcaya: A Women’s Picture, directed by New York artist Josiah McElheny, which premiered at Art Basel Miami and showed at the Wexner Center for the Arts, White Cube Bermondsey, Centre de Cultura Contemporània de Barcelona, and elsewhere. They also conducted the first collaborative MFA in Creative Writing ever, The Tolerance Project.

Zolf teaches at the University of Pennsylvania. They were the founding poetry editor for The Walrus magazine and have edited several books of poetry. Their archives are held at York University in Toronto, Ontario, and at Simon Fraser University's Special Collections in Burnaby, British Columbia.

They are the child of author and broadcaster Larry Zolf and Patricia Zolf.

== Works ==
- 1999: Her Absence, this Wanderer. Ottawa: BuschekBooks.
- 2004: Masque. Toronto: The Mercury Press.
- 2007: Human Resources. Toronto: Coach House Books.
- 2008: Shoot & Weep. Vancouver: Nomados.
- 2010: Neighbour Procedure. Toronto: Coach House Books.
- 2014: Janey's Arcadia. Toronto: Coach House Books.
- 2019: Social Poesis: The Poetry of Rachel Zolf: Wilfrid Laurier University Press.
- 2021: No One's Witness: A Monstrous Poetics: Duke University Press.

== Awards ==
- Pew Fellowship in the Arts, 2018

=== No One's Witness ===
- Finalist, 2022 Pegasus Award for Poetry Criticism, presented by the Poetry Foundation

=== Janey's Arcadia ===
- Finalist, Lambda Literary Award for Lesbian Poetry
- Finalist, Raymond Souster Memorial Award
- Finalist, Vine Awards (Poetry)

=== Human Resources ===
- Trillium Book Award for Poetry
- Finalist, Lambda Literary Award for Lesbian Poetry

=== Masque ===
- Finalist, Trillium Book Award for Poetry

=== Her Absence, This Wanderer ===
- Finalist, CBC Literary Competition
