= The Adroit Journal =

American literary magazine

The Adroit Journal is an American literary magazine founded in November 2010. Published five times per year by founding editor Peter LaBerge, The Adroit Journal is currently based in Philadelphia. The journal was produced with the support of the University of Pennsylvania's Kelly Writers House from 2013 to 2017 and was based in the San Francisco Bay Area and New York City from 2017-2019 and 2020-2023 respectively.

== Contributors and Staff ==
Authors featured in The Adroit Journal include Fatimah Asghar, NoViolet Bulawayo, K-Ming Chang, Chen Chen, Franny Choi, Alex Dimitrov, Mark Doty, Rita Dove, Terrance Hayes, Sarah Kay, Dorianne Laux, Lydia Millet, D. A. Powell, Diane Seuss, Danez Smith, Arthur Sze, Ned Vizzini, and Ocean Vuong.

The journal has published numerous United States Poet Laureate selectees, MacArthur Fellow honorees, Pulitzer Prize winners, and National Book Award winners, and contributors are regularly recognized by the Best American Series, the National Endowment for the Arts, the Poetry Foundation’s Ruth Lilly and Dorothy Sargent Rosenberg Fellowships, the Pushcart Prize Anthology, Stanford University’s Wallace Stegner Fellowships in Poetry and Fiction, the Whiting Foundation’s Whiting Awards, and many more organizations that offer industry-leading funding and support.

Previous or current staff members of The Adroit Journal include Anthony Veasna So, Kinsale Drake, Leila Chatti, Aria Aber, Jim Whiteside, Rhodes Scholars Russell Bogue and Aaron Robertson, and Michele Selene Ang of 13 Reasons Why.

== Anthology and Press Presence ==
Pieces from the journal have been selected for inclusion in The Best American Poetry, Best New Poets, The Best American Nonrequired Reading, Verse Daily, Poetry Daily, and Best of the Net, and have been awarded eight Pushcart Prizes.

Work first published in The Adroit Journal has also been discussed and featured in or by the New York Times, the New Yorker, the Paris Review, American Life in Poetry, the Slowdown, Teen Vogue, PBS NewsHour, NPR, and College Board.

The Adroit Journal has peaked at #3 (2026) on Clifford Garstang's annual literary magazine ranking in the poetry genre, behind the American Poetry Review and Poetry Magazine.

A video recording of Jim Parsons reading Max McDonough's poem "Egg Harbor", originally published in The Adroit Journal, was featured by The New York Times in February 2018.

Edition	Genre	Pushcart Prize Presence
2027	Poetry	Brenda Hillman, "In the Spaces of Secret Enclosure"
2026	Poetry	James Allen Hall, "Inheritance at Corresponding Periods of Life, at Corresponding Seasons of the Year, as Limited by Sex"
2026	Poetry	Melissa McKinstry, "Late Spring Epiphany After the Georgia O’Keeffe Exhibit"
2025	Poetry	Brian Gyamfi, "The Revival"
2025	Poetry	Diane Seuss, "An Aria"
2024	Poetry	James Longenbach, "Two People"
2022	Poetry	Dorianne Laux, “Midnight is a Beautiful Curse”
2017	Poetry	Alex Dimitrov, “Cocaine”

== The Adroit Journal Summer Mentorship Program ==
The Adroit Journal Summer Mentorship Program is an online program that pairs experienced writers with high school and secondary students. Mentees have been recognized through the National YoungArts Foundation & United States Presidential Scholar in the Arts designation, the National Scholastic Art & Writing Awards, and the Foyle Young Poet of the Year Awards. Participants have also been featured in Teen Vogue and NPR, among other publications.

== The Gregory Djanikian Scholars Program ==
Gregory Djanikian was born in Alexandria, Egypt, and came to the United States when he was eight years old. He has published seven poetry collections, the latest of which is Sojourners of the In-Between (CMU Press, 2020). The Djanikian Scholars Program recognizes six emerging poets each year, beginning with 2018.

Year	Gregory Djanikian Scholars
2026	Nico Amador, Ellie Black, Nina C. Peláez, Talan Tee, Prsicilla Wathington, & Ziyi Yan
2025	janan alexandra, Akhim Yuseff Cabey, Lie Ford, Brian Gyamfi, Tyler Raso, & Giovannai Rose
2024	Aliyah Cotton, Majda Gama, Melissa McKinstry, Quinton Okoro, Edythe Rodriguez, & Syd Westley
2023	Erik Jonah, Willie Lee Kinard III, Emily Lawson, Sarah Fathima Mohammed, Kelan Nee, & Gabriel Ramirez
2022	Sarah Ghazal Ali, Leyla Çolpan, Jordan Escobar, Tennessee Hill, Anni Liu, & Avia Tadmor
2021	Jari Bradley, Donte Collins, Jane Huffman, L. A. Johnson, Natasha Rao, & Brandon Thurman
2020	Bryan Byrdlong, Steven Duong, Sara Elkamel, Matthew Gellman, Ae Hee Lee, & Gabriella R. Tallmadge
2019	Gabrielle Bates, Bernard Ferguson, Aidan Forster, Dan Kraines, Alycia Pirmohamed, & Leslie Sainz
2018	K-Ming Chang, Robin Estrin, Paige Lewis, Brandon Melendez, Michael M. Weinstein, & Keith S. Wilson

== The Anthony Veasna So Scholars Program ==
Anthony Veasna So (1992-2020) was an American writer of short stories that often drew from his upbringing as a child of Cambodian immigrants. His debut short story collection, Afterparties, was published posthumously by HarperCollins in 2021 and was named a New York Times Bestseller and a winner of the National Book Critics Circle’s John Leonard Prize for Best First Book. The Veasna So Scholars Program recognizes six emerging fiction writers each year, beginning with 2023.

Year	Anthony Veasna So Scholars
2026	Adesuwa Agbonile, Courtney Bill, J. Marcelo Borromeo, Stanley Delgado, Esmé Kaplan-Kinsey, & Persimmon Tobing
2025	Mayookh Barua, Hiya Chowdhury, Andy Lopez, Elisa Luna Ady, Nur Turkmani, & Yun Wei
2024	C. Adán Cabrera, Allison Field Bell, Cristina Fries, Devon Halliday, Lu Han, & Basmah Sakrani
2023	Vincent Chavez, Ani Cooney, Kelly X. Hui, Gracie Newman, Tierney Oberhammer, & Marguerite Sheffer

== The Adroit Prizes for Poetry and Prose ==
The Adroit Prizes are awarded annually to two students of secondary or undergraduate status "whose written work inspires the masses to believe beyond feeling the work."

Year	Genre	Guest Judge	Recipient	Institution	Runner-Up	Institution
2026	Poetry	Leila Chatti	Adelaide Sendlenski	University of Pennsylvania	Morgan Zachary	Boston University
2026	Prose	Karissa Chen	Shnayjaah Valentine Jeanty	Columbia University	Ana Carpenter	Columbia University
2025	Poetry	Danez Smith	Nikhe Braimah	Yale University	Eliza Gilbert	Vassar College
2025	Prose	Aria Aber	Annie Zhu	Westwood High School	Kaya Dierks / Eliza Gilbert	Yale University / Vassar College
2024	Poetry	Ocean Vuong	Melanie Zhou	Stanford University	Kaylee Young-Eun Jeong	Columbia University
2024	Prose	Kaveh Akbar	Rosie Hong	Clements High School	Vivian DeRosa	Smith College
2023	Poetry	Natalie Diaz	Kinsale Drake	Yale University	N/A	N/A
2023	Prose	Ocean Vuong	Kelly X. Hui	University of Chicago	N/A	N/A
2022	Poetry	Arthur Sze	Ethan Luk	Princeton University	Natalie Jarrett	Northwestern University
2022	Prose	Kali Fajardo-Anstine	Nandita Naik	Stanford University	Sofia Miller	Denison University
2021	Poetry	Carl Phillips	Stephanie Chang	Kenyon College	Delilah Silberman	Bennington College
2021	Prose	Samantha Hunt	Enshia Li	Stanford University	Amal Haddad	Swarthmore College
2020	Poetry	Jericho Brown	Tariq Thompson	Kenyon College	Stephanie Chang	Kenyon College
2020	Prose	Kristen Arnett	Yasmeen Khan	Grand Oaks High School	Coral Bello-Martinez	Franklin & Marshall College
2019	Poetry	Franny Choi	Fiona Stanton	Interlochen Arts Academy	Daniel Blokh	Alabama School of Fine Arts
2019	Prose	Jamel Brinkley	Angelo Hernandez-Sias	Columbia University	Jason Lalljee	University of Chicago
2018	Poetry	Alex Dimitrov	Theis Anderson	University of Cambridge	Lauren Sanderson	Colgate University
2018	Prose	Rachel Heng	Polina Solovyeva	New York University	Sarah Feng	Pinewood School
2017	Poetry	Safiya Sinclair	Safwan Khatib	Columbia University	Christina Im	Sunset High School
2017	Prose	Allegra Hyde	Charity Young	Princeton University	Aidan Forster	SC Gov. School for Arts & Humanities
2016	Poetry	Corey Van Landingham	Rachel Cruea	Ohio Northern University	Theophilus Kwek	Oxford University
2016	Prose	Kevin Moffett	Brynne Rebele-Henry	Homeschool	Walker Caplan	Yale University
2015	Poetry	Tarfia Faizullah	Ian Burnette	Kenyon College	Brynne Rebele-Henry	Homeschool
2015	Prose	Alexander Maksik	Lydia Weintraub	Princeton University	John Stegner	University of Virginia
2014	Poetry	Richie Hofmann	Nathan Durham	Kenyon College	Ian Burnette	Kenyon College
2014	Prose	Wendy Rawlings	Isabel DeBre	Brown University	Madeleine Cravens	Oberlin College
2013	Poetry	Garth Greenwell	Shelley Whitaker	Hollins University	Jacob Oet	Swarthmore College
2013	Prose	Marlin Barton	Elizabeth Martin	Princeton University	Lily Fishman	Barnard College
2012	Poetry	Chloe Honum	Stephanie Guo	Canyon Crest Academy	Nicholas Pierce	Texas Tech University
2012	Prose	N/A	Phoebe Nir	Brown University	Flora Collins	Vassar College
