= 21st Lambda Literary Awards =

2009 literary awards ceremony

The 21st Lambda Literary Awards were held in 2009, to honour works of LGBT literature published in 2008.

== Special awards ==
Category	Winner
Pioneer Award	Leslie Feinberg, The Violet Quill

== Nominees and winners ==
Category	Winner	Nominated
Bisexual Literature	Jenny Block, Open	Lisa M. Diamond, Sexual Fluidity: Understanding Women’s Love & Desire; Honor Moore, The Bishop’s Daughter; Ron Jackson Suresha, Kinsey Zero Through Sixty: Bisexual Perspectives on Kinsey; Edmund White, Rimbaud
Gay Debut Fiction	Shawn Stewart Ruff, Finlater	Daniel Allen Cox, Shuck; Evan Fallenberg, Light Fell; Drew Ferguson, The Screwed-Up Life of Charlie the Second; Mike Hoolboom, The Steve Machine
Gay Erotica	Richard Labonté and James Lear, eds., Best Gay Erotica 2009	James Lear, The Secret Tunnel; William Maltese, Victor J. Banis, Jardonn Smith and J.P. Bowie, Hard Working Men
Gay Fiction	Scott Heim, We Disappear	David Francis, Stray Dog Winter; Thomas Glave, The Torturer’s Wife; Joseph Olshan, The Conversion; Jay Quinn, The Boomerang Kid
Gay Memoir/Biography	Sheila Rowbotham, Edward Carpenter: A Life of Liberty and Love	Aaron Cooper, Bringing Him Home; Joel Derfner, Swish; Bob Morris, Assisted Loving; Aaron Shurin, King of Shadows
Gay Mystery	Scott Sherman, First You Fall	Stephen Anable, The Fisher Boy; Anthony Bidulka, Sundowner Ubuntu; Neil Plakcy, Mahu Fire; John Morgan Wilson, Spider Season
Gay Poetry	Mark Doty, Fire to Fire; James Allen Hall, Now You're the Enemy	Rick Barot, Want; Jericho Brown, Please; Jack Spicer (Peter Gizzi and Kevin Killian, eds.), My Vocabulary Did This to Me: The Collected Poetry of Jack Spicer
Gay Romance	Larry Duplechan, Got 'til it's Gone	Laura Baumbach and Josh Lanyon, Mexican Heat; N. L. Gassert, The Protector
Lesbian Debut Fiction	Magdalena Zurawski, The Bruise	Jill Malone, Red Audrey & the Roping; Linda Villarosa, Passing for Black; Meri Weiss, Closer to Fine; Chavisa Woods, Love Does Not Make Me Gentle or Kind
Lesbian Erotica	Radclyffe and Karin Kallmaker, In Deep Waters 2: Cruising the Strip	Sacchi Green and Rakelle Valencia, Lipstick on Her Collar; Lynne Jamneck, Periphery: Erotic Lesbian Futures
Lesbian Fiction	Emma Donoghue, The Sealed Letter; Chandra Mayor, All the Pretty Girls	Ivan Coyote, The Slow Fix; Stephanie Grant, Map of Ireland; Ruth Perkinson, Breaking Spirit Bridge
Lesbian Memoir/Biography	Maureen Seaton, Sex Talks to Girls: A Memoir	Susan Griffin, Wrestling with the Angel of Democracy; Thea Hillman, Intersex (For Lack of a Better Word); Joanne Passet, Sex Variant Woman; Abbe Smith, Case of a Lifetime
Lesbian Mystery	Josie Gordon, Whacked	Diane Anderson-Minshall and Jacob Anderson-Minshall, Blind Faith; Ellen Hart, Sweet Poison; Jessica Thomas, Losers Weepers; Ali Vali, Calling the Dead
Lesbian Poetry	Judy Grahn, love belongs to those who do the feeling	Elizabeth Bradfield, Interpretive Work; Daphne Gottlieb, Kissing Dead Girls; Maureen N. McLane, Same Life; Nancy K. Pearson, Two Minutes of Light
Lesbian Romance	Karin Kallmaker, The Kiss That Counted	Georgia Beers, Finding Home; Catherine Friend, A Pirate’s Heart; JLee Meyer, Hotel Liaison; Radclyffe, The Lonely Hearts Club
LGBT Anthology	Thomas Glave, Our Caribbean	Peter Burton, ed., A Casualty of War: Gay Short Fiction; Sabrina Chapadjiev, ed., Live Through This; Chris Freeman and James J. Berg, eds., Love, West Hollywood; Raphael Kadushin, ed., Big Trips: More Good Gay Travel Writing
LGBT Children's/Young Adult	Bill Konigsberg, Out of the Pocket	Christian Burch, Hit the Road, Manny; David Levithan, How They Met & Other Stories; Pat Schmatz, Mousetraps; Martin Wilson, What They Always Tell Us; Ellen Wittlinger, Love & Lies: Marisol’s Story
LGBT Drama	Carolyn Gage, The Second Coming of Joan of Arc	Dan Bernitt, Phi Alpha Gamma; Martin Duberman, Radical Acts: Collected Political Plays; Scott Schofield, Two Truths and a Lie; Vanda, Vile Affections
LGBT Non-Fiction	Jane Rule, Loving the Difficult	Nancy Agabian, Me as Her Again; Michelle Cliff, If I Could Write This in Fire; William N. Eskridge, Jr., Dishonorable Passions: Sodomy Laws in America 1861-2003; Nancy Polikoff, Beyond (Straight & Gay) Marriage; Kai Wright, Drifting Toward Love
LGBT Science Fiction/Fantasy/Horror	Nicole Kimberling, Turnskin	Astrid Amara, The Archer’s Heart; Barth Anderson, The Magician and the Fool; Steve Berman, Wilde Stories 2008; Craig Laurance Gidney, Sea, Swallow Me and Other Stories
LGBT Studies	Regina Kunzel, Criminal Intimacy: Prison and the Uneven History of Modern American Sexuality	Michelle Ann Abate, Tomboys: A Literary & Cultural History; Amin Ghaziani, The Dividends of Dissent: How Conflict and Culture Work in Lesbian and Gay Marches on Washington; Kevin P. Murphy, Political Manhood: Red Bloods, Mollycoddles, & the Politics of Progressive Reform; Linda Williams, Screening Sex
Transgender Literature	Thea Hillman, Intersex (For Lack of a Better Word)	Marcus Ewert and Rex Ray, 10,000 Dresses; Scott Schofield, Two Truths and a Lie; Ely Shipley, Boy with Flowers; Susan Stryker, Transgender History
