= Audre Lorde Award =

Annual literary award

- Awarded for: Lesbian poetry
- Sponsored by: Publishing Triangle
- Reward: US$1,000
- Established: 2001
- Website: http://www.publishingtriangle.org/awards.asp

The Audre Lorde Award for Lesbian Poetry is an annual literary award, presented by Publishing Triangle to honour works of lesbian poetry. First presented in 2001, the award was named in memory of American poet Audre Lorde.

== Recipients ==
Award winners and finalists
Year	Author	Title	Publisher	Result	Ref.
2001	Marilyn Hacker	Squares and Courtyards	W. W. Norton	Winner	
2001	Elena Georgiou	Mercy Mercy Me	Painted Leaf Press	Finalist	
2001	Nancy Boutilier	On the Eighth Day Adam Slept Alone	Black Sparrow Press	Finalist	
2002	Gerry Gomez Pearlberg	Mr. Bluebird	Painted Leaf Press	Winner	
2002	Eileen Myles	Skies	Black Sparrow Press	Finalist	
2002	Letta Neely	Here	Wildheart Press	Finalist	
2003	Melanie Braverman	Red	Perugia Press	Winner	
2003	Eloise Klein Healy	Passing	Red Hen Press	Finalist	
2003	Martha Serpas	Côte Blanche	New Issues	Finalist	
2004	Daphne Gottlieb	Final Girl	Soft Skull Press	Winner	
2004	Marilyn Hacker	Desesperanto	W. W. Norton	Finalist	
2004	Minnie Bruce Pratt	The Dirt She Ate	University of Pittsburgh Press	Finalist	
2005	Maureen Seaton	Venus Examines Her Breast	Carnegie Mellon University Press	Winner	
2005	Adrienne Rich	The School Among the Ruins	W. W. Norton	Finalist	
2005	Lee Ann Roripaugh	Year of the Snake	Southern Illinois University Press	Finalist	
2006	Jane Miller	A Palace of Pearls	Copper Canyon Press	Winner	
2006	Djuna Barnes; edited by Philip Herring and Osias Stutman	Collected Poems with Notes Toward the Memoirs	University of Wisconsin Press	Finalist	
2006	June Jordan	Directed by Desire	Copper Canyon Press	Finalist	
2007	Jennifer Rose	Hometown for an Hour	Ohio University Press	Winner	
2007	Kate Lynn Hibbard	Sleeping Upside Down	Silverfish Review Press	Finalist	
2007	Robin Becker	The Domain of Perfect Affection	University of Pittsburgh Press	Finalist	
2008	Joan Larkin	My Body	Hanging Loose Press	Winner	
2008	Eileen Myles	Sorry, Tree	Wave Books	Finalist	
2008	Jennifer Perrine	The Body Is No Machine	New Issues	Finalist	
2009	Elizabeth Bradfield	Interpretive Work	Red Hen Press	Winner	
2009	Elaine Sexton	Causeway	New Issues	Finalist	
2009	Maureen McLane	Same Life	Farrar, Straus and Giroux	Finalist	
2010	Stacie Cassarino	Zero at the Bone	New Issues Poetry & Prose	Winner	
2010	Kristin Naca	Bird Eating Bird	HarperPerennial/HarperCollins	Finalist	
2010	Lee Ann Roripaugh	On the Cusp of a Dangerous Year	Southern Illinois University Press	Finalist	
2011	Jen Currin	The Inquisition Yours	Coach House Books	Winner	
2011	Eleanor Lerman	The Sensual World Re-emerges	Sarabande Books	Finalist	
2011	Elizabeth J. Colen	Money for Sunsets	Steel Toe Books	Finalist	
2012	Minnie Bruce Pratt	Inside the Money Machine	Carolina Wren Press	Winner	
2012	Christina Hutchins	The Stranger Dissolves	Sixteen Rivers Press	Finalist	
2012	Rae Gouirand	Open Winter	Bellday Books	Finalist	
2012	Susan Hawthorne	Cow	Spinifex Press	Finalist	
2013	Rachel Rose	Song and Spectacle	Harbour Publishing	Winner	
2013	Davida Singer	Port of Call	Plain View Press	Finalist	
2013	Marty McConnell	Wine for a Shotgun	EM Press	Finalist	
2013	Susan Sherman	The Light That Puts an End to Dreams	Wings Press	Finalist	
2014	Angie Estes	Enchantée	Oberlin College Press	Winner	
2014	Hailey Leithauser	Swoop	Graywolf Press	Finalist	
2014	Kamilah Aisha Moon	She Has a Name	Four Way Books	Finalist	
2014	Stacey Waite	Butch Geography	Tupelo Press	Finalist	
2015	Meg Day	Last Psalm at Sea Level	Barrow Street Press	Winner	
2015	Beverly Burch	How a Mirage Works	Sixteen Rivers Press	Finalist	
2015	Ellen Bass	Like a Beggar	Copper Canyon Press	Finalist	
2015	Robin Becker	Tiger Heron	University of Pittsburgh Press	Finalist	
2016	Jennifer Perrine	No Confession, No Mass	University of Nebraska Press	Winner	
2016	Dawn Lundy	Life in a Box Is a Pretty Life	Nightboat Books	Finalist	
2016	Leah Lakshmi Piepzna-Samarasinha	Bodymap	Mawenzi House/TSAR	Finalist	
2016	Nickole Brown	Fanny Says	BOA Editions	Finalist	
2017	Francine J. Harris	play dead	Alice James Books	Winner	
2017	Donika Kelly	Bestiary	Graywolf Press	Finalist	
2017	Juliet Patterson	Threnody	Nightboat Books	Finalist	
2017	Pat Parker, edited by Julie R. Enszer	The Complete Works of Pat Parker	Sinister Wisdom/A Midsummer Night's Press	Finalist	
2018	Gabrielle Calvocoressi	Rocket Fantastic	Persea Books	Winner	
2018	Cassie Pruyn	Lena	Texas Tech University Press	Finalist	
2018	Duriel E. Harris	No Dictionary of a Living Tongue	Nightboat Books	Finalist	
2018	Maureen N. McLane	Some Say	Farrar, Straus and Giroux	Finalist	
2019	Margaree Little	Rest	Four Way Books	Winner	
2019	Alicia Mountain	High Ground Coward	University of Iowa Press	Finalist	
2019	Brynne Rebele-Henry	Autobiography of a Wound	University of Pittsburgh Press	Finalist	
2019	Lisa Dordal	Mosaic of the Dark	Black Lawrence Press	Finalist	
2020	Shira Erlichman	Odes to Lithium	Alice James Books	Winner	
2020	Carmen Giménez Smith	Be Recorder	Graywolf Press	Finalist	
2020	Franny Choi	Soft Science	Alice James Books	Finalist	
2020	Leah Lakshmi Piepzna-Samarasinha	Tonguebreaker	Arsenal Pulp Press	Finalist	
2021	Natalie Diaz	Postcolonial Love Poem	Graywolf Press	Winner	
2021	Ellen Bass	Indigo	Copper Canyon Press	Finalist	
2021	Francine J. Harris	Here Is the Sweet Hand	Farrar, Straus and Giroux	Finalist	
2021	Sarah M. Sala	Devil's Lake	Tolsun Books	Finalist	
2022	Cheryl Boyce Taylor	Mama Phife Represents	Haymarket Books	Winner	
2022	Donika Kelly	The Renunciations	Graywolf Press	Finalist	
2022	Minnie Bruce Pratt	Magnified	Wesleyan University Press	Finalist	
2022	Rosie Stockton	Permanent Volta	Nightboat Books	Finalist	
2023	Irena Klepfisz	Her Birth and Later Years: New and Collected Poems, 1971-2021	Wesleyan University Press	Winner	
2023	Natalie Wee	Beast at Every Threshold	Arsenal Pulp Press	Finalist	
2023	Rage Hezekiah	Yearn	Diode Editions	Finalist	
2023	Siaara Freeman	Urbanshee	Button Poetry	Finalist	
2024	Leslie Sainz	Have You Been Long Enough at Table	Tin House	Winner	
2024	Alicia Mountain	Four in Hand	BOA Editions	Finalist	
2024	Candace Williams	I Am the Most Dangerous Thing	Alice James Books	Finalist	
2024	Destiny Hemphill	motherworld: a devotional for the alter-life	Action Books	Finalist	
2025	Cass Donish	Your Dazzling Death	Knopf	Winner	
2025	Saretta Morgan	Alt-Nature	Coffee House Press	Finalist	
2025	RK Fauth	A Dream in Which I Am Playing with Bees	Texas Tech University Press	Finalist	
2025	Omotara James	Song of My Softening	Alice James Books	Finalist	
2026	Achy Obejas	The Boy Kingdom / El reino de los varones	Beacon Press	Winner	
2026	SaraEllen Strongman (ed.)	Essential Poems by Pat Parker	Sinister Wisdom	Finalist	
2026	Ally Ang	Let the Moon Wobble	Alice James Books	Finalist	
2026	Keetje Kuipers	Lonely Women Make Good Lovers	BOA Editions	Finalist	
2026	Elizabeth Bradfield	SOFAR	Persea Books	Finalist	
