= Rone Shavers =

American novelist, reviewer, and critic

- Born: 1970 (age 55–56)
- Education: Bennington College, The New School, University of Illinois at Chicago
- Occupations: Novelist, reviewer, critic
- Writing career
- Period: Contemporary
- Genre: Fiction
- Notable work: Silverfish (2020)
- Website: www.roneshavers.com

Rone Shavers (born 1970) is an American author, literature critic, and reviewer. He is an associate professor of English at The University of Utah in Salt Lake City, Utah.

== Career ==
Shavers is an associate professor of English at The University of Utah in Salt Lake City, Utah. He previously taught at The College of Saint Rose, the New England Young Writers Conference at Bread Loaf, Northwestern University, and the University of Illinois at Chicago.

He has held the Pabst Endowed Chair for Master Writers and Mentoring Artist-in-Residence at the Atlantic Center for the Arts, a Nancy B. Negley Writer-in-Residence fellowship at the Dora Maar House in Ménerbes, France, and an Arthur T. Schwab Poet-in-Residence fellowship at MacDowell.

Shavers has also been the recipient of artist-in-residence fellowships at the Constance Saltonstall Foundation for the Arts, the Loghaven Artist Residency, Ragdale, the Virginia Center for the Creative Arts (VCCA), VCCA France, and several other locales.

Shavers is the fiction and hybrid genre editor at the award-winning journal, Obsidian: Literature and Arts in the African Diaspora, and his critical essays and reviews have appeared in such diverse publications as American Book Review, The Critical Flame, Electronic Book Review, Fiction Writers Review, and The Quarterly Conversation.

Shavers is the author of the experimental Afrofuturist novel Silverfish (Clash Books, 2020), which was a finalist for the 2021 Council of Literary Magazines and Presses (CLMP) Firecracker Award in Fiction and one of The Brooklyn Rail's "Best Books of 2020." The book is described as "hilarious" and "profound".

== Writing Style and Influence ==
Much of Shavers' short fiction is influenced by the Crônica, a Portuguese-language genre featuring short, newsy, informal writing. He describes it as "a looser form of narrative, practiced by writers like Fernando Pessoa and Clarice Lispector". Shavers' Crônicas mirror the amorphous nature of the genre, but his work engages with and explores observations about various social and political African American experiences. Author Kenning JP Garcia describes Shavers' Crônicas as satire "which pretends also to be playful but is making the reader work as the writer himself has worked." This work has appeared in numerous journals, including Action Spectacle, Another Chicago Magazine, Big Other, Black Warrior Review, BOMB Magazine, PANK, and The Vestal Review. A collection of his work, Ten Crônicas: A prose chapbook, was published by The Magnificent Field press in May 2021.

== Contributions to Afrofuturism ==
Shavers has made significant contributions to the field of Afrofuturism. In addition to writing fiction that has been widely described as Afrofuturist, Shavers co-edited the special 'Afrofuturism' issue that appeared in the journal Science Fiction Studies in 2007 along with Mark Bould. He also co-curated (with Gallery Director Judie Gilmore) and wrote the catalog for the 2019 art exhibition titled "In Place of Now: Established and Emerging Artists Explore Black Identity through an Afrofuturist Lens," which featured the artwork of Willie Cole, Renee Cox, and Alisa Sikelianos-Carter, among others, and took place at the Opalka Gallery of Sage College in Albany, NY. Russell Sage College described the exhibit as "bring[ing] together emerging and established black artists whose work engages in the politically subversive acts of picturing 'otherness,' reinventing the past, and reclaiming the future." "The exhibition...helped expand [Afrofuturism]...to include more-grounded African diaspora identity politics alongside the otherworldly."

== Bibliography ==
- Form and (Dis)Content, Volume II: Speculative and Experimental Approaches to Language by Authors of Color Introduction and editorial work by Rone Shavers. A compilation showcasing work by Krista Franklin, Kenning JP Garcia, Douglas Kearney, and Jennifer Maritza McCauley in Obsidian: Literature and Arts in the African Diaspora, Vol 46.1, Spring 2021.
- Silverfish from Clash Books, 2020.
- "Cronica of the Grand Allusion" and "Crônica del Crepúsculo" in Hairstreak Butterfly Review, Issue 5: March 6, 2023.
- "Four Crônicas" in BOMB magazine, Issue 160, Summer 2022.
- "Crônica of the Hermit" online at Pine Hills Review, May 19, 2021.
