= Les Deux Mégots =

Coffeehouse in New York City (1961–63)

Coordinates: 40°43′39″N 73°59′14″W

Les Deux Mégots was a coffeehouse in East Village, Manhattan, New York City, from 1961 to 1963. It became known as a hub for poets and artists associated with the city's emerging downtown bohemian scene. The café hosted poetry readings, attracting figures connected to the Beat Generation and the nascent Pop Art movement.

== History ==
In 1960, Mickey Ruskin opened his first venture, the Tenth Street Coffee Shop, in Manhattan's East Village. Encouraged by his friend Howard Ant, he began hosting poetry readings there, which soon attracted a lively mix of poets and artists from the New York avant-garde scene. The growing crowds quickly exceeded the small café's capacity.

Soon after, Ruskin met Bill Mackey, who shared his interest in opening a new coffeehouse. They found a renovated basement store "with a warm pine interior of a ski lodge" at 64 East 7th Street in the East Village and launched Les Deux Mégots in June 1961. They offered a wide variety of coffees—including anise, cinnamon, Romano, and cappuccino—along with steamed cider, grenadine, and Jamaican ginger beer, as well as meals.

When Ruskin and Mackey first opened the café, they worried they might have gone a bit too far east—few Village regulars ventured between First and Second Avenues. Yet Les Deux Mégots soon became the heart of the emerging artistic movement. At the time, the Lower East Side was home to many European immigrants and was beginning to see an influx of a younger generation of artists, musicians, beatniks, and later hippies. Among them were numerous poets and writers who quickly made their mark, creating their own communities within local bars and coffeehouses—places where they shared their work, exchanged ideas, and socialized.

The name "Les Deux Mégots," which is French for "two cigarette butts," was a playful nod to the famous Paris café Les Deux Magots. It reflected its casual, avant-garde atmosphere and countercultural spirit. The venue rapidly became a key gathering place for poets and artists. They held poetry readings on Monday and Wednesday evenings, continuing the tradition that had started at Ruskin's Tenth Street Coffee House. Ruskin recalled:

Allan and Don Katzman were two of the people who read there, and Allan founded the East Village Other. People like Edward Gorham, who lived out in Arizona, and LeRoi Jones. I don't know if LeRoi ever read there, but he used to come around. Denise Levertov, Red Barrett, Louis Zakowski, and Jerry Rothenberg, who's become known as a translator, he translated The Deputy horn German — all read there. Almost all of the New York Poets, with the possible exception of Allen Ginsberg, read at the coffeehouse.

In 1961, Nomad released its New York issue (#10/11), featuring many poets who were regulars at Les Deux Mégots. That same year, Hesperidian Press published Poems from Les Deux Mégots, which included not only poetry but also photographs and biographical notes on the selected writers. Meanwhile, Dan Saxon launched his monthly magazine Poets at Les Deux Mégots, reproduced from ditto masters on which poets hand-copied their work during the open readings. Other small presses, such as Hawk's Well Press and Trobar Press, also continued to publish literary magazines and chapbooks, further supporting the vibrant downtown poetry scene.

Harvey Matusow, a prominent figure in the McCarthy era, spoke about his prison experience during "Talk Out American Prisons," one of the regular informal audience discussions held at Les Deux Mégots on November 1, 1961. Matusow provided the "inside" perspective on prison life, while Donald McNamara of the New York Institute of Criminology offered the "outside" view.

Although Les Deux Mégots was a popular hangout, it wasn't profitable. They had been robbed twice, and Ruskin sold his share at the end of 1962. The poets, finding themselves at odds with the new owner, had the poetry readings organized by poet Paul Blackburn moved in February 1963 to Café Le Metro, owned by Moe and Cindy Margules. Les Deux Mégots continued to operate through much of 1963 before closing later that year. In 1964, a macrobiotic restaurant and teahouse called Paradox opened in its place.

Ruskin went on to open Max's Kansas City in 1965, the legendary nightclub that became a gathering place for leading figures of the downtown art and music scenes.

== List of poets ==
Some of the readers at Les Deux Mégots included:

- Howard Ant
- Richard Barker
- Carol Berge
- Paul Blackburn
- Jerry Bloedow
- George Economou
- Serge Gavronsky
- John Harriman
- Marguerite Harris
- David Henderson
- Calvin C. Hernton
- Denise Levertov
- Allen Katzman
- Don Katzman
- Robert Lima
- Jackson Mac Low
- Jack Micheline
- Robert Nichols
- Rochelle Owens
- Jerome Rothenberg
- Armand Schwerner
- Susan Sherman
- Diane Wakoski
