= Stacie Cassarino =

American poet, literary scholar, editor, and educator

- Born: February 15, 1975 (age 51); USA
- Education: UCLA (PhD), University of Washington (MA), Middlebury College (BA)
- Occupation: Poet
- Writing career
- Period: contemporary
- Genre: poetry
- Notable awards: Lexi Rudnitsky Editor's Choice Award, LAMBDA Literary Award, Audre Lorde Award, Astraea Foundation Writers’ Fund, 92Y "Discovery"/The Nation Prize
- Website: www.staciecassarino.com

Stacie Cassarino (born 1975) is an American poet, educator, editor, and mother. She is the author of two collections of poems, Each Luminous Thing and Zero at the Bone, and a monograph, Culinary Poetics and Edible Images in Twentieth-Century American Literature.

== Life ==
Born in Hartford, Connecticut of Italian heritage, she is a dual citizen of the United States and Italy. She is a graduate of UCLA (2014), University of Washington-Seattle (2000), and Middlebury College (1997).

She has lived in Venice, California; Brooklyn, New York; Seattle, Washington; and Portland, Oregon; as well as abroad in Italy, England, Costa Rica, and Brazil.

She lives in Vermont with her three daughters.

== Career ==
She has been on the faculty at Smith College, Mount Holyoke College, Middlebury College, UCLA, Fairfield University, and Pratt Institute.

She was formerly a Copy Editor at ELLE.com.

She has also worked as a private chef, and cooked at Babbo in New York City and Cafe Lago in Seattle.

Her most recent book of poems, Each Luminous Thing, won the 2022 Lexi Rudnitsky Editors' Choice Award and was published by Persea Books in November 2023. The collection was recommended under "Newly Published Poetry" in The New York Times Book Review (October, 2023), and was featured in Ron Charles' Book Club in The Washington Post (November 2023).

Her first collection of poetry, Zero at the Bone, was published by New Issues Press in 2009 to critical acclaim. It won a 2010 Lambda Literary Award, and the Audre Lorde Award.

In 2005, she won the 92NY "Discovery"/The Nation Joan Leiman Jacobson Poetry Prize. She also received a major award from the Astraea Foundation Writer's Fund in 2007, and was a finalist for the Rona Jaffe Writers’ Award.

Her poetry, which deals with subjects such as place, desire, loss, and motherhood, has been published in notable literary journals such as Poetry Northwest, Kenyon Review, The New Republic, Verse Daily, Gulf Coast, Crazyhorse, Iowa Review, Georgia Review, AGNI, and the Comstock Review (where she was awarded the 2003 winning poem). Her poem "Summer Solstice" was featured on Garrison Keillor's The Writers’ Almanac on NPR in 2011.

Her work has been widely commented on, by poets such as the British writer Glyn Maxwell who reviewed the collection stating: "Cassarino's voice ranges far and near, from the gasp and sigh of creaturely love to the dizzying spaces of American distance, whiteness, silence. Few poets these days can draw their lines so strongly..."

Her second book, Culinary Poetics and Edible Images in Twentieth-Century Literature, connects foodscapes to aesthetic movements, demonstrating how American writers responded to the changing tastes of the nation.

== Awards ==
- 1996 - Scholarship, Bread Loaf Writers' Conference
- 1997 - Donald Everett Axinn Annual Prize
- 2000 - Writers’ Grant Residency, Vermont Studio Center
- 2003 - Wallace-Reader’s Digest Fellowship Residency, Millay Colony
- 2003 - Friends’ Fellowship Residency, Ragdale Foundation
- 2003 - Muriel Craft Bailey Memorial Award
- 2004 - Fellowship Residency, Julia & David White Artists’ Colony
- 2005 - 92NY “Discovery”/The Nation Joan Leiman Jacobson Poetry Prize
- 2007 - Astraea Foundation, Writer’s Fund Grant
- 2010 - Publishing Triangle Audre Lorde Award
- 2010 - Lambda Literary Award
- 2011 - Shirley Dorothy Robbins Creative Writing Award, UCLA
- 2022 - Lexi Rudnitsky Editor's Choice Award

== Works ==
- Each Luminous Thing, New York: Persea Books, 2023
- Culinary Poetics and Edible Images in Twentieth-Century American Literature, Columbus: The Ohio State University Press, 2018
- Zero at the Bone, Western Michigan University: New Issues Press, 2009

== Sources ==
- Zero at the Bone (2008, New Issues Press)
- Author Biography at New Issues Press
- Discovery/The Nation 2005 Prize Winners and poem "Midwest Eclogue"
- Poem: "Goldfish are Ordinary" at Poets.org
- Review of Zero at the Bone by poet and critic Ron Slate
