= Francine J. Harris =

American poet

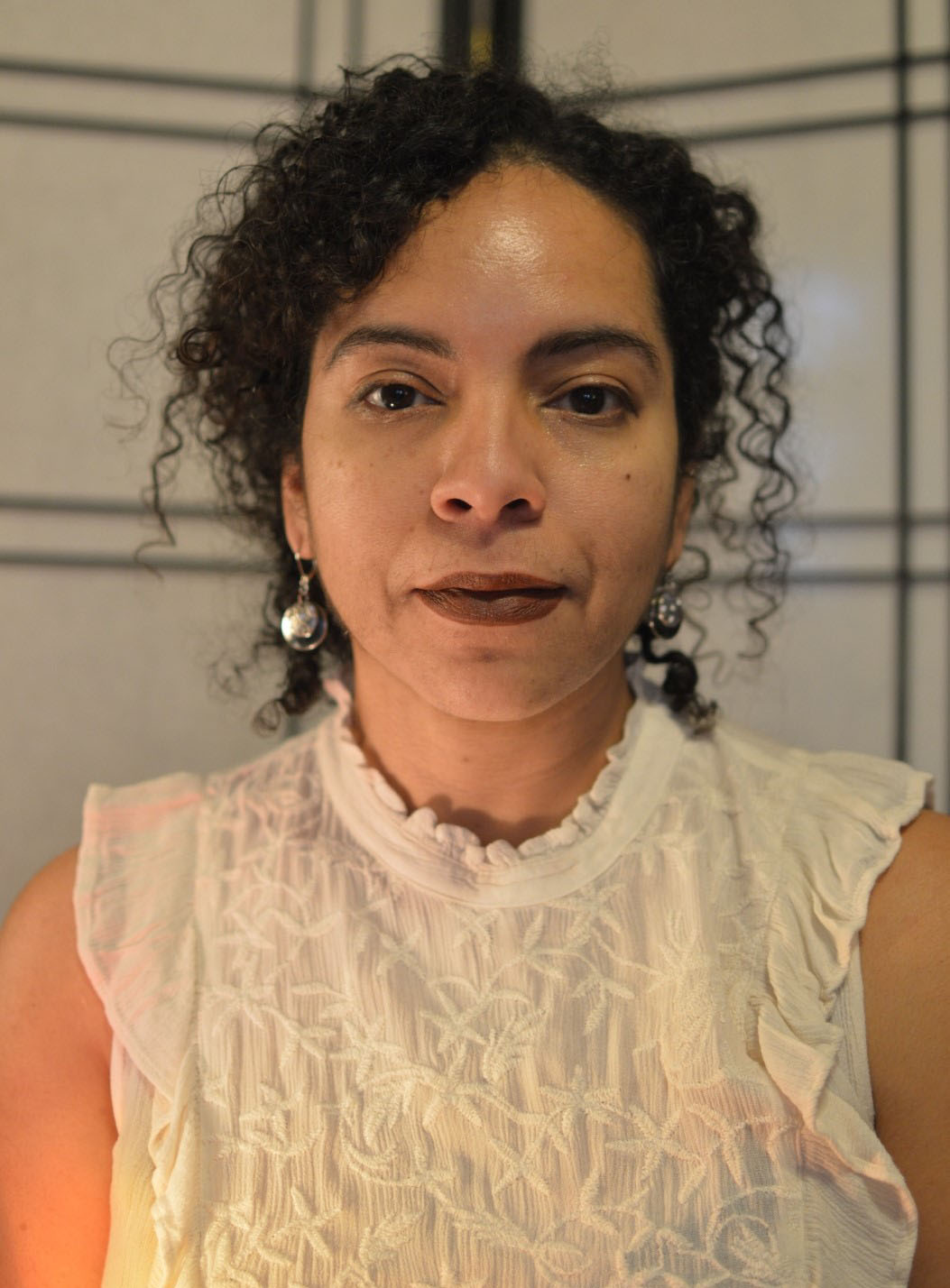
francine j. harris

francine j. harris is an American poet. She is the author of three collections of poetry: Here Is the Sweet Hand (Farrar, Straus & Giroux, 2020), play dead (2016), and allegiance (2012). harris is a 2025 John Simon Guggenheim Memorial Foundation Fellow and winner of the 2020 National Book Critics Circle Award, for Here is the Sweet Hand. Here is the Sweet Hand was also a finalist for the 2020 Kingsley Tufts Award. harris' first collection, allegiance, was a finalist for the Kate Tufts Discovery Award and the PEN Open Book Award. Her second collection, play dead, was the winner of the Lambda Literary and the Audre Lorde Awards, and was finalist for the Hurston/Wright Legacy Award.

Her work has appeared in various literary publications including American Poetry Review, New York Book Review, McSweeney’s, Ploughshares, POETRY, Academy of American Poets, Indiana Review, Callaloo, Boston Review, and elsewhere.

== Books ==
- Here Is the Sweet Hand (Farrar, Straus & Giroux, 2020)
- Play Dead (Alice James Books, 2016)
- Allegiance (Wayne State University Press, 2012)

=== Awards and honors ===
harris is a 2025 John Simon Guggenheim Memorial Foundation fellow and was the winner of the 2020 National Book Critics Circle Award, and was a finalist for the 2020 Kingsley Tufts Award.

She was winner of the 2014 Boston Review Annual Poetry Contest. She has received fellowships from the National Endowment for the Arts, the MacDowell Colony, and the Cullman Center for Scholars and Writers at the New York Public Library.

=== Reviews ===
- "A poet of ideas and emotions, of the personal and politic, harris also writes sublimely about the environment and what it represents about this nation. " "Poetry’s Power In ‘Here Is The Sweet Hand'." Chicago Review of Books, 2020.
- "allegiance touches on universal thematic areas – sexuality, brutality, faith, race – and yet francine j. harris’s vision is so specific that the concepts are rendered unique each time." Muzzle Magazine.
- "Tender is a quality of mind. It is also a quality of meat. francine j. harris’s poems are tenderized: they not only insist upon their embodiment, they punch, howl, beat, and bleed their way into being. "Playing Dead: On the poetry of francine j. harris." Boston Review, 2017.

=== Personal life ===
francine j. harris is originally from Detroit. She is Professor of English at the University of Houston, where she serves as the Consulting Faculty Editor at Gulf Coast: A Journal of Literature and Fine Arts.
