= Elizabeth Bradfield =

American poet

Elizabeth Bradfield is an American poet and naturalist. She is the author of several books, including Interpretive Work, winner of the Audre Lorde Award, and Approaching Ice. Her work has been nominated for the Lambda Literary Prize and the James Laughlin Award. In 2005, Bradfield founded a publishing house named Broadsided Press. In addition to her writing, she is active in wildlife conservation.

== Personal life ==
Bradfield grew up in Tacoma, Washington, and now lives in Cape Cod, Massachusetts. She is an associate professor in the Practice of English and co-director of Creative Writing at Brandeis University. She has also taught online workshops for Orion magazine. She obtained a Master of Fine Arts from the University of Alaska, Anchorage, and was awarded a Stegner Fellowship by Stanford University.

== Work ==
Bradfield has written five books of poems, including Interpretive Work, winner of the Audre Lorde Award and a finalist for the Lambda Literary Award, Approaching Ice, finalist for the James Laughlin Award, Once Removed, Toward Antarctica, and Theorem, a collaboration with artist Antonia Contro. Her poems and essays have appeared in The Atlantic, The New Yorker, Poetry, Orion, and other literary magazines and anthologies. She has collaborated with video artists to create short films for several of her poems, including To Find Stars in Another Language and Travel of the Light.

In 2005, Bradfield founded Broadsided Press and serves as its Editor in Chief. Broadsided Press publishes literary-visual collaborations as posters that can be printed and shared freely, and those published include Mary Jo Bang, Jericho Brown, and Camille Dungy. She also serves as a Contributing Editor to The Alaska Quarterly Review.

Her work as a naturalist has included leading local wildlife workshops and whale watches and assisting with marine mammal field work—especially seals—in the Cape Cod region.

== Critical reception ==
Poet Nicky Beer, writing for Diagram magazine, called Interpretive Work "an auspicious debut ... a testament to poetry's marvelous capacity to decontextualize human life into moments of resounding insight." According to Jordan Davis from the Constant Critic, "[Bradfield] has a touch of that sublime regret we’ve required, since forever, for how no first experience can stay fresh forever, but she has much much more of the gift for staying alive to the variations of experience. It is the gift that makes a long career, or a satisfying love." Reviewing Toward Antarctica for the Anchorage Daily News, Nancy Lord called Bradfield's language "exquisite" and commented "the world of ice and the world in general will never look the same again."

== Bibliography ==
- Interpretive Work. Red Hen Press/Arktoi Books, 2008. ISBN 978-0-9800407-1-5.
- Approaching Ice. Persea Books, 2010. ISBN 978-0-89255-355-6.
- Once Removed. Persea Books, 2015. ISBN 978-0-89255-463-8.
- Toward Antarctica. Boreal Books/Red Hen Press, 2019. ISBN 978-1-59709-886-1.
- Theorem. Poetry Northwest Editions, 2020. ISBN 978-1-949166-02-6.
