= Carol Bergé =

American writer (1928–2006)

- Born: 1928
- Died: 2006 (aged 77–78)
- Occupation: Poet

Carol Bergé (1928–2006) was an American poet, highly active in the literary, performing and visual arts renaissance of the 1960s and 1970s in New York City. In the 1980s a scandal in academia and her choice to fictionalize it in her 1984 book Secrets, Gossip and Slander cost her teaching jobs as well as support from the publishing industry. From there she championed antiquing as a profession, taking an extended sabbatical from writing until the last few years of her life, when she completed two books, both published posthumously.

== Life ==
Carol Bergé (1928-2006) received NEA, NYSCA and Pushcart awards. Active in the creative renaissance of the 1960s, Bergé performed with Paul Blackburn, Roberts Blossom, William S. Burroughs, Philip Corner, Gregory Corso, Fielding Dawson, Diane DiPrima, Allen Ginsberg, LeRoi Jones, Tuli Kupferberg, Denise Levertov, Jackson Mac Low, Taylor Mead, Rochelle Owens, Simon Perchik, Charles Plymell, Ishmael Reed, Jerome Rothenberg, Ed Sanders, Carolee Schneemann, Hubert Selby Jr., Diane Wakoski, et al. Always involved in explorations of new forms and innovative writing, Bergé moved from genre to genre and location to location.

At age 14 she bought a Longwy bowl in an antiques shop for $10; that year, her first poem was published. Her poetry was widely published; she was part of the Fluxus multimedia activities; she lists her early influences as Malinowski, Benedict, Mead, Kluckhohn, Freuchen, Twain, Dickens, Shakespeare, the Brontes, DuMaurier, Poe (the stories), Conan Doyle, Saki, Chaucer and Browning.

A second stay at the Hotel Chelsea in Manhattan got her in at Studio 54, ca. 1981. During the 1970s she taught writing and multimedia by invitation at 16 universities, keeping her antiques-laden farmhouse in Woodstock. From 1970-1984, she published & edited the literary magazine CENTER. Finally settling in Santa Fe, she started Blue Gate Art & Antiques, selling retro merch through the 1990s, gaining weight and giving up the party, only to lose the weight and crave a cigarette while tethered to an oxygen tank during her last few years. In 1960, she co-opened Five Cities Gallery in Manhattan’s East Village; next door was Tenth Street Coffeehouse, where the Light Years poets began their readings. Publishing credits include American Poetry Review, Exquisite Corpse, Gargoyle, The Nation, Triquarterly, Wood Coin, Yale Literary Review, and over 200 others.

In 1970, in Woodstock, New York, she began a teaching career and rehabbed a farmhouse more than a century old. From 1977-78, she was a PEN board member advocating for freedom of speech. After a divorce, she won custody of her son in 1960 and traveled with Makoto Oda in Europe. In 1955 she married Jack; a son, Peter, was born in 1956. She enjoyed getting “swacked” on imported pot but shied away from the hallucinogens trend. From middle-class bobby-soxer, to counterculture beatnik, to entrepreneurial antiquer... she took risks and lived by her own design. A stay at the Chelsea in 1969 put her in contact with Jim Morrison and Janis Joplin.

Her body of work consists of 23 works of fiction, nonfiction and poetry. She attended New York University and Columbia, studying social sciences and fine arts for almost a decade, dismissing the option of a degree program.

== Awards ==
- Helene Wurlitzer Foundation fellowship (1964)
- Fellowships-in-residence at the MacDowell Colony
- National Endowment fellowship for creative writing (1979).

== Work ==
Carol Berge authored 23 books of fiction, nonfiction and poetry, and her writings appeared in over 200 literary venues, including Origin, The Nation, Beatitude/East, Yale Literary Review, Triquarterly, Outburst, Seventh Street, American Poetry Review, The Plume Horn, etc.

=== Poetry ===
- Alba Genesis. Aesopus Press. 1979.
- Alba Nemesis. Amalgamated Sensitivity. 1979.
- An American Romance. Black Sparrow Press. 1969.
- The Chambers. Aylesford Review Press. 1969.
- Circles, as in the Eye. Desert Review Press. 1969.
- From a Soft Angle. Bobbs-Merrill. 1971.
- Lumina. Renegade Press. 1965.
- Poems Made of Skin. Weed/Flower Press. 1968.
- Rituals & Gargoyles. Newedi Press. 1977.
- A Song, A Chant. Amalgamated Sensitivity. 1978.
- The Unexpected. Membrane Press. 1976.
- The Vulnerable Island. Renegade Press. 1964.

=== Fiction ===
- Acts of Love: An American Novel. Bobbs-Merrill. 1973.
- Antics: Passionate Stories. AWAREing Press/Regent Press. 2007.
- A Couple Called Moebius. Bobbs-Merrill. 1972.
- The Doppler Effect. Effie's Books. 1979.
- Fierce Metronome. Window. 1981.
- Remembrance of Things to Come. Theo. 1979.
- Secrets, Gossip & Slander. Reed & Cannon. 1984.
- The Unfolding (Part I). Theo. 1969.
- Zebras. Tribal/Center. 1991.

=== Non-fiction ===
- The Vancouver Report. Fuck You Press. 1964.
- Light Years: an Anthology on Sociocultural Happenings. AWAREing Press/Spuyten Duyvil. 2010.

=== Anthologies ===
- Leroi Jones, ed. (1962). Four Young Lady Poets: Carol Bergé, Barbara Moraff, Rochelle Owens, Diane Wakoski. Totem Press-Corinth Books.
- Sascha Feinstein, Yusef Komunyakaa, ed. (1991). The Jazz Poetry Anthology. Indiana University Press. ISBN 978-0-253-20637-4.
- Kristian Carlsson, ed. (2009). Kvinnas Beat. Smockadoll Press, Sweden.

== Quote ==
"Having a poem of mine from the 1960s ('Position') chosen to appear in a college textbook in 1998... was a big payoff. I thought only square poets, far more socially acceptable than I, made it into the textbooks. There's even a Cliff's Notes type page on Internet telling students how to write an analysis of my poem, and it's inaccurate in its interpretation of my writing, to my amusement and dismay—who would imagine it would be so easy to misunderstand such a simple poem as 'Position'... It makes me chuckle. It is a poem I read at Les Deux Mégots. One among hundreds. Go figure."—excerpted from Carol Berge's memoir chapter in LIGHT YEARS (AWAREing Press/Spuyten Duyvil, 2010)
