= Jane Miller (poet) =

American poet (born 1949)

- Born: 1949 (age 76–77) New York, U.S.
- Occupation: Poet
- Notable awards: Audre Lorde Award (2006)

Jane Miller (born 1949) is an American poet.

== Life ==
Jane Miller was born in New York and lives in Tucson, Arizona. She served as a professor for many years in the Creative Writing Program at the University of Arizona—including a stint as its Director—and is currently Visiting Poet at The University of Texas Michener Center in Austin. She has published ten volumes of poetry of which The Greater Leisures was a National Poetry Series selection. Who Is Trixie the Trasher? and Other Questions (Copper Canyon Press, 2018) is her most recent book of poems.

Her numerous awards include a Western States Book Award, a Lila Wallace Reader's Digest Award, a Guggenheim fellowship and two fellowships from the National Endowment for the Arts.

== Awards ==
- National Poetry Series Selection for The Greater Leisures
- Western States Book Award for August Zero
- Two National Endowment for the Arts Fellowships
- Lila Wallace Reader’s Digest Award
- John Simon Guggenheim Memorial Foundation Fellowship
- Audre Lorde Award

== Works ==
- Who Is Trixie the Trasher? and Other Questions. Copper Canyon Press. 2018. ISBN 978-1-55659-540-0.
- "Life's Ironies," poets.org, 2014
- Thunderbird. Copper Canyon Press. July 1, 2013. ISBN 978-1-55659-441-0.
- A Palace of Pearls. Copper Canyon Press. April 1, 2005. ISBN 978-1-55659-222-5.
- Wherever You Lay Your Head. Copper Canyon Press. 1999. ISBN 978-1-55659-128-0.
- Memory at These Speeds; New and Selected Poems. Copper Canyon Press. 1996. ISBN 978-1-55659-118-1.
- August Zero. Copper Canyon Press. 1993. ISBN 978-1-55659-060-3.
- American Odalisque. Copper Canyon Press. November 1987. ISBN 978-1-55659-008-5.
- The Great Leisures (National Poetry Series). Doubleday. 1983. ISBN 978-0385184144.
- Black Holes Black Stockings
- Many Junipers. Copper Beech Press. 1980. ISBN 978-0-914278-29-0.
- Heartbeats

=== Anthologies ===
- Susan Aizenberg; Erin Belieu; Jeremy Countryman, eds. (2001). "Giants". The extraordinary tide: new poetry by American women. Columbia University Press. ISBN 978-0-231-11963-4.

=== Prose ===
- Seven Mediterraneans

=== Essays ===
- Working Time: Essays on Poetry, Culture, and Travel. University of Michigan Press. 1992. ISBN 978-0-472-06480-9.
- Albert Gelpi, ed. (1993). "From "Working Time"". Denise Levertov: selected criticism. University of Michigan Press. ISBN 978-0-472-06416-8.
- "Sea Level." Martin Lammon, ed. (1996). Written in water, written in stone: twenty years of Poets on poetry. University of Michigan Press. ISBN 978-0-472-06634-6.

=== Ploughshares ===
- "Scene", Ploughshares, Spring 1979
- "Without a Name for This", Ploughshares, Spring 1979
- "A Dream of Broken Glass ", Ploughshares, Spring 1979
- "Eavesdropping at the Swim Club, 1934 ", Ploughshares, Spring 1979
- "Blanks for New Things", Ploughshares, Winter 1990-91
- "Warrior", Ploughshares, Winter 1990-91
- "The General's Briefing", Ploughshares, Winter 1991-92
- "Parts of Speech", Ploughshares, Spring 1996
- "Humility", Ploughshares, Winter 2001-2

== Reviews ==
Poet Jane Miller collaborates with artist Beverly Pepper on a highly personal journey through the debris of the poet’s crumbling relationship, and her mother’s descent into illness. Beautifully rendered poems and short chapters of poetic prose combine with Pepper’s chalk and oil drawings to form an intimate and unique meditation on the nature of love, of heartache, of the many midnights we, each and every one of us, live through and carry with us through our lives.

A major accomplishment of Jane Miller’s Midnights is that she rescues middle-of-the-night ideas from worn-out truisms and offers them as the torturous realities they can be in experience.

Jane Miller is hardly alone in demanding that the structures of her art reflect the compulsions of consciousness, but unlike poets who allow pallid abstraction to attenuate emotion and song, Miller, as late millennium supplicant, won't relinquish extravagance, seduction, rapture, as essential elements of a poem's brash presence. Her human figure, careening through its volatile relations, "charge card in hand," indebted and reverential, makes of shatter a kind of atomized coherence, a kinetic, compassionate form.
