= Mickey Ruskin =

American restaurateur (1933-1983)

- Born: Bernard Michael Ruskin; May 8, 1933; Jersey City, New Jersey, U.S.
- Died: May 16, 1983 (aged 50); New York City, U.S.
- Education: Cornell University (B.A.); Cornell Law School (LL.B.)
- Occupations: Restaurateur; nightlife impresario; arts patron
- Known for: Owner of Max's Kansas City

Bernard Michael Ruskin (May 8, 1933 – May 16, 1983), known as Mickey Ruskin, was an American restaurateur, nightlife impresario, and arts patron. He is best known for founding and operating the influential New York City bar-restaurant-club Max's Kansas City, which opened in 1965 and became a pivotal gathering place for visual artists, poets, musicians, and the counterculture.

Ruskin originally studied to become a lawyer, but soon shifted into operating coffeehouses and bars in Manhattan's East Village and Greenwich Village — including the Tenth Street Coffeehouse, Les Deux Mégots, and the Ninth Circle — before opening Max's. He later opened a couple of other successful places like The Lower Manhattan Ocean Club and Kipling's Last Resort (later renamed Chinese Chance) before his death at 50 in 1983.

== Biography ==
=== Early life and education ===
Bernard Michael Ruskin was born on May 8, 1933, in Jersey City, New Jersey. He received a bachelor's degree from Cornell University in 1954. Ruskin was prepared to follow in his father's footsteps at a New Jersey legal office. After graduating from Cornell Law School in 1958 and passing the New York bar, he worked as a lawyer for a year while living in uptown Manhattan with Sharon, who would become his first wife. Ruskin soon realized office life wasn't for him. He then spent a year and a half in pre-med, earning strong grades and a spot at a top medical school, before deciding that another white-collar career wouldn’t make him any happier.

=== Career as a restaurateur ===
In 1960, Ruskin saw a Village Voice ad that said "Rent or Own Coffee Shop." A few weeks later, he rented the space and opened the Tenth Street Coffee Shop in the East Village. His friend, Howard Ant, suggested that he host poetry readings at the Tenth Street Coffee Shop. The coffee shop soon became a gathering place for downtown poets and their artist friends. Ruskin found he preferred the company of poets and artists to uptown lawyers and trusted his instincts about customers: "I found very quickly, from the first coffee shop I had, [that] if I followed my instincts and didn't let in the people I didn't like and only let in people I like, I could make a living, learn, and really have fun." Although the business was doing well, Ruskin and his partner Ed Kaplan were at odds. Their disagreements escalated into a dispute over who would buy the other out, and eventually, Ruskin found someone willing to buy his share.

Within three months of starting the poetry readings, the crowd had outgrown the space. Ruskin met Bill Mackey, who was interested in opening a new coffeehouse, and together they founded Les Deux Mégots at 64 East 7th Street in the East Village in 1961. Mégots means "cigarette butts" in French—a playful twist on Les Deux Magots café in Paris. The café quickly became a hub for poets and artists. Nearly every New York poet—except perhaps Allen Ginsberg—read at Les Deux Mégots. Ruskin sold his share of Les Deux Megots at the end of 1962. The place closed in 1963, and Paradox, a macrobiotic restaurant-teahouse, opened at the same location in 1964.

Ruskin connected Bobby Crivit, a childhood friend who wanted to open a jazz club. In the West Village, they established the Ninth Circle on West 10th Street in 1963. It evolved into a hangout for artists and musicians rather than a jazz club. Ruskin and Crivit later opened the Annex on the Lower East Side to handle the overflow from the Ninth Circle, giving his friends and customers a spot to gather in both the East and West Villages. After about three months, Ruskin sold both the Annex and the Ninth Circle to Crivit. The sale was amicable, and Ruskin left for a year in Europe. As part of the agreement, he included a non-compete clause preventing him from opening another place in the Village for two years.

In 1965, Ruskin opened Max's Kansas City at 213 Park Avenue South in Union Square. Andy Warhol, Roy Lichtenstein, and Robert Rauschenberg were among the prominent members of the Pop Art scene that frequented Max's, using the back room as a casual salon. Warhol, who often arrived with a group of his "superstars," called Max's the "ultimate hangout." Ruskin was an art fan, so Warhol offered artworks in exchange for dining credit, allowing his entourage to sign for their meals until the credit was depleted. Max's developed into a hub for the burgeoning glam rock and punk music movements by the 1970s, when The Velvet Underground, Iggy Pop, David Bowie, The New York Dolls, and Patti Smith performed there. In 1974, Max's filed for reorganization through voluntary bankruptcy proceedings and closed later that year. Ruskin sold the establishment in 1975, and it soon reopened under new ownership that same year.

In order to handle the overflowing crowds at Max's, Ruskin opened the Longview Country Club across the street from Max's on 19th Street and Park Avenue South in 1968. In 1969, the Longview Country Club became Levine's Restaurant. Ruskin created a menu that included traditional Irish-Jewish-Canadian dishes, including matzo ball soup, Irish lamb stew, and salmon steak Halifax, referencing artist Les Levine's multiethnic heritage. Levine accepted Ruskin's offer of $2,500 in food and 5% of future earnings for the use of his name.

His next club was The Locale on Waverly Place, which he opened with partner Richard Sanders in 1975. Sanders kept The Locale and Mickey went on to open The Lower Manhattan Ocean Club, on Chambers Street in TriBeCa in 1976.

In 1978, Ruskin and his partner Richard Sanders opened a bar and restaurant called Kipling's Last Resort (nicknamed One University Place) at 1 University Place in Greenwich Village. It was later called Chinese Chance, which Ruskin operated until his death.

=== Death ===
Ruskin died at the age of 50 in New York City on May 16, 1983. According to his friend, writer Linda Yablonsky, he had grown increasingly depressed, began using heroin, and ultimately died from a fatal drug combination. He was survived by his wife, Kathryn; three daughters, Nina, Victoria and Jessica; a son, Michael; his parents, May and Victor Ruskin, and a sister, Phyllis Hoberman.
