= Leslie Sainz =

American poet and editor

- Born: 1992 (age 33–34) Miami, Florida, U.S.
- Occupation: Poet; editor
- Genre: Poetry
- Notable works: Have You Been Long Enough at Table
- Notable awards: Audre Lorde Award

Leslie Sainz is an American poet and editor. Her debut poetry collection, Have You Been Long Enough at Table, won the 2024 Audre Lorde Award for Lesbian Poetry. In 2021, she was a NEA creative writing fellow and became the managing editor of New England Review.

== Life and career ==
Sainz was born in Miami, Florida, in 1992. She received a B.A. from Carnegie Mellon University and an M.F.A. from the University of Wisconsin–Madison.

She became managing editor of New England Review in 2021 and edits the magazine's Staging Style craft series. She has previously worked as an editor for Carnegie Mellon University Press, Bull City Press, and West Branch.

Her poems have appeared in the Academy of American Poets' Poem-a-Day, The Yale Review, Kenyon Review, and other publications.

=== Have You Been Long Enough at Table ===
Her debut poetry collection, Have You Been Long Enough at Table, was published by Tin House in 2023. Reviews of the collection discussed its treatment of Cuban American history, family, displacement, exile, and violence. The book was a finalist for the Poetry Society of America's 2024 Norma Farber First Book Award and the 2024 New England Book Award in Poetry.

== Awards and honors ==
- 2021: National Endowment for the Arts creative writing fellowship
- 2024: Audre Lorde Award for Lesbian Poetry, for Have You Been Long Enough at Table
- 2024: Poetry Society of America Norma Farber First Book Award finalist, for Have You Been Long Enough at Table
- 2024: New England Book Award in Poetry finalist, for Have You Been Long Enough at Table

== Works ==
- Have You Been Long Enough at Table. Tin House. 2023. ISBN 9781959030119.
