= Rochelle Owens =

American poet and playwright (born 1936)

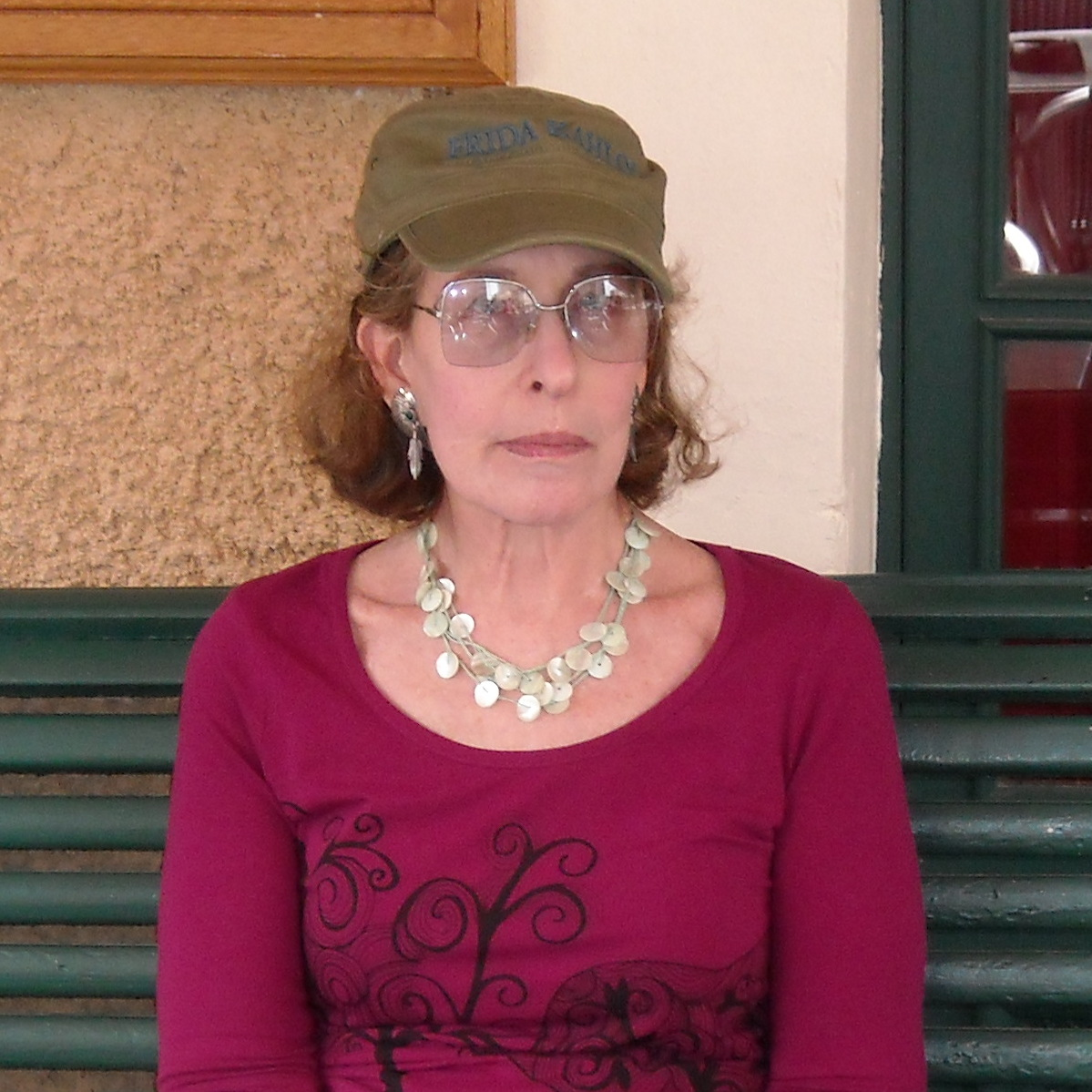
- Born: April 2, 1936 (age 90); Brooklyn, New York
- Education: New School for Social Research; University of Montreal
- Occupations: Poet; playwright

Rochelle Bass Owens (born April 2, 1936 in Brooklyn, New York) is an American poet and playwright.

== Life and career ==
Owens is the daughter of Maxwell and Molly (Adler) Bass. She was born and raised in Brooklyn, New York, then studied at the New School for Social Research and the University of Montreal.

After a brief marriage to David Owens, she married the poet George Economou on June 17, 1962. Owens has taught at Brown University, the University of California-San Diego, the University of Oklahoma, and the University of Southwestern Louisiana. As of 2018, Owens lives in Wellfleet, Massachusetts and Philadelphia. Her biography is published in Gale Research Contemporary Authors, Volume 2 (1983). In 2006, she was celebrated in La MaMa's Coffeehouse Chronicles series.

== Theatre ==
She was highly involved in the early off-off-Broadway theatre movement. As a poet, she contributed greatly to the St. Mark's Poetry Project and was a founding participant in Mickey Ruskin and Bill Mackey's Les Deux Mégots on 7th Street in the East Village. Owens was also involved in the ethnopoetics movement. Her work has influenced experimental playwrights and poets in subsequent generations.

During the 1960s and 1970s, Owens' plays premiered in New York City at the Judson Poets Theatre, La MaMa Experimental Theatre Club, Theater for the New City, and the American Place Theatre. She was a founding member of the New York Theater Strategy and the Women's Theater Council. Her play Futz was first published in 1961 and is foundational to the off-off-Broadway canon. It raised some controversy, and was banned in Toronto and called a "lust and bestiality play" by a newspaper in Edinburgh. Futz was made into a film in 1969. The cast includes Sally Kirkland and Frederic Forrest.

Owens' plays have been performed in theatre festivals in Edinburgh, Avignon, Paris, and Berlin.

== Poetry ==
Owens at the age of 19 had her poetry published in LeRoi Jones' (as Amiri Baraka was known then) and Hettie Jones’ magazine Yugen. Owens’ poems appear in the volume Jones edited in 1962 titled "Four Young Lady Poets". Owens may not refer to herself as a "Beat poet", but she was there and influential among the Beat poets and that movement in New York. She read her poems at The Poetry Project at St. Mark's Church In-the-Bowery in New York City, on the same bill that included Allen Ginsberg and Gregory Corso. Allen Ginsberg introduced her poetry to LeRoi Jones.

== Radio ==
In 1984, after relocating to Norman, Oklahoma, Owens hosted "The Writers Mind", a radio interview program from the University of Oklahoma with various artists.

== Awards and recognition ==
- 1965 - Rockefeller Foundation grant
- 1965, 1967, 1982 - Village Voice Obie Awards
- 1971 - Guggenheim Fellowship
- 1973 - ASCAP Award
- 1976 - National Endowment for the Arts grant
- 1984 - honors from the New York Drama Critics' Circle
- 1993 - Rockefeller Fellowship at Bellagio Center
- 1994 - Oklahoma Book Award finalist
- New York Creative Artists in Public Service Program

== Selected works ==
=== Plays ===
- The String Game, Judson Poets Theatre, New York City, 1965; published by Methuen: 1969
- Futz, Tyrone Guthrie Workshop Theatre, Minneapolis, 1965; Cafe La Mama, New York City, 1967; published by Hawk's Well Press: 1962, and Methuen: 1969
- Homo, Cafe La Mama, 1966; Ambiance Theater, London, 1966; published by Hawk's Well Press: 1968
- Istanboul. Hawk's Well Press. 1968. Judson Poets Theatre, 1968; Actors Playhouse, New York City, 1971
- Beclch, Theatre for the Living Arts, Philadelphia; Gate Theatre, New York City, 1968; published by Hawk's Well Press: 1968
- Futz and What Came After. Random House. 1968. produced in New York City, 1968
- Queen of Greece, La Mama E.T.C., New York City, 1969; published by Alexander Street Press: 2003
- He Wants Shih, La MaMa, New York City, 1973; published by Dutton: 1974
- The Karl Marx Play and Others. Dutton. 1974. ISBN 9780525473664. American Place Theatre, New York City, 1973
- O.K. Certaldo, published by Dutton: 1974
- Kontraption, published by Dutton: 1974; New York Theater Strategy, 1976
- Coconut Folk-Singer, published by Dutton: 1974
- Farmer's Almanac, published by Dutton: 1974
- Emma Instigated Me, New York City, 1976; published in Performance Arts Journal: 1976
- The Widow And The Colonel published in Best Short Plays 1977
- Who Do You Want, Piere Vidal?, Theatre for the New City, New York City, 1982
- Chucky's Hunch, Theatre for the New City, 1981; Harold Clurman Theatre, New York City, 1982
- Plays by Rochelle Owens: Chucky's Hunch, Futz, Kontraption, Three Front. Broadway Play Publishing Inc. 2000. ISBN 978-0-88145-172-6.
- Mountain Rites, published by Alexander Street Press: 2003
- Sweet Potatoes, published by Alexander Street Press: 2003

=== Screenplays ===
- Futz, Commonwealth United: 1969

=== Poetry ===
- Not Be Essence That Cannot Be. Trobar. 1961.
- Salt and Core. Black Sparrow Press. 1968.
- I Am the Babe of Joseph Stalin's Daughter: Poems, 1961-71. Kulchur Press. 1972.
- Poems from Joe's Garage. Burning Deck Press. 1973.
- The Joe Eighty-Two Creation Poems, Black Sparrow Press: 1974
- The Joe Chronicles II, Black Sparrow Press, 1977
- Shemuel. New Rivers Press. 1979. ISBN 978-0-89823-006-2.
- French Light. Press with the Flexible Voice. 1984.
- Constructs. Poetry Around. 1985.
- Anthropologists at a Dinner Party. Chax Press. 1985.
- W.C. Fields In French Light, Contact 2 Press: 1986
- How Much Paint Does The Painting Need, Kulchur Press 1988
- Black Chalk, Texture Press 1992
- Rubbed Stones and Other Poems, Texture Press: 1994
- New And Selected Poems 1961-1996, Junction Press 1997
- Luca, Discourse On Life And Death, Junction Press: 2000
- Triptych, Texture Press: 2006
- Solitary Workwoman, Junction Press: 2011
- Out of Ur - New & Selected Poems 1961 - 2012, Shearsman Books 2012
- Hermaphropoetics, Drifting Geometries, Singing Horse Press 2017
- The Aardvark Venus - New and Selected Poems 1961 - 2020, Texture Press: 2020
- Patterns Of Animus, Texture Press: 2022

=== Anthologies ===
- Leroi Jones, ed. (1962). Four Young Lady Poets: Carol Bergé, Barbara Moraff, Rochelle Owens, Diane Wakoski. Totem-Corinth Press.
- Paris Leary, Robert Kelly, ed. (1965). A Controversy of Poets. Doubleday.
- New American Plays (Vol. 2), Hoffman, Hill, Wang, 1968
- The New Underground Theater, Schroeder, Bantam Books: 1968
- Technicians of the Sacred, Doubleday: 1969
- Inside Outer Space, Anchor Books: 1970
- The Best Short Plays, Chilton: 1971, 1977, 1978
- The Off-Off Broadway Book, Poland, Mailman, Bobbs-Merrill: 1972
- America A Prophecy, Rothenberg, Quasha, Random House: 1973
- No More Masks, Howe, Bass, Anchor/Doubleday: 1973
- Psyche: The Feminine Poetic Consciousness, Segnitz, Rainey, Dial Press: 1973
- Rising Tides: 20th Century American Women Poets, Chester, Barba, Washington Square Press: 1973
- A Big Jewish Book, Rothenberg, Lenowitz, Doubleday: 1979
- Scenarios: Scripts to Perform, Richard Kostelanetz, Assembling Press: 1980
- A Century In Two Decades, Burning Deck Press: 1982
- Exiled In The Word, Copper Canyon Press: 1989
- Deep Down: The New Sensual Writing by Women, Faber and Faber: 1989
- Poems For The Millennium (Vol. 2): 1998
- The Columbia Granger's Index to Poetry, Kale, Granger, Columbia University Press: 2002
- North American Women's Plays from Colonial Times to the Present, Alexander Street Press: 2003
- All Poets Welcome: The Lower East Side Poetry Scene in the 60's, University of California Press: 2003
- Light Years, Spuyten Duyvil, Awareing Press: 2010

=== Radio plays ===
- The Widow And The Colonel, 1976 (commissioned by Voice of America for the bicentennial)
- Sweet Potatoes, 1977

=== Videos ===
- Oklahoma Too, 1987
- How much Paint Does The Painting Need, 1991
- Black Chalk, 1994
- Chucky's Hunch, 2024

=== Sound recordings ===
- A Shaman's Notebook, Broadside Records 1968
- The Karl Marx Play, lyrics by Owens, music by Galt MacDermot, Kilmarnock 1974
- Black Box 17
- San Francisco State University, Poetry Center and American Poetry Archives 1987

=== Translations (to English) ===
- The Passersby, trans. Owens, Henry Holt: 1993 from the French Les Passants by Liliane Atlan

=== As editor ===
- Spontaneous Combustion: Eight New American Plays, Winterhouse: 1972

=== Novels ===
- Journey To Purity, Texture Press: 2009
