= Alvin Aubert =

American poet and scholar (1930–2014)

- Born: Alvin Bernard Aubert; March 1930; Lutcher, Louisiana, U.S.
- Died: January 7, 2014 (aged 83); Trenton, New Jersey, U.S.
- Education: Southern University; University of Michigan; University of Illinois
- Occupations: Academic, poet, playwright, editor, literary critic
- Known for: Founder of Obsidian: Literature and Arts in the African Diaspora

Alvin Bernard Aubert (March 1930 – January 7, 2014) was an American academic, poet, playwright, editor, literary critic, and scholar who championed African-American culture and rural life along the southern Mississippi River.

Aubert was born and grew up in Lutcher, Louisiana, and attended Southern University, the University of Michigan, and the University of Illinois. He taught at Southern University, SUNY Fredonia, University of Oregon, and Wayne State University (WSU). At WSU, he was a professor of English, taught creative writing and Afro-American literature, while serving as Interim Chair of the Department of Africana Studies. He founded and edited the journal Obsidian, now Obsidian II, for publishing works in English by, and about, writers of African descent worldwide. He was a Woodrow Wilson Fellow in literature (1955), and a Bread Loaf Scholar in poetry (1968). His poems, articles, and reviews appeared in literary magazines and anthologies, including regular reviews of Afro-American poetry books in Cornell University's Epoch magazine. In 1986, Aubert's play Home From Harlem was staged at WSU's Bonstelle Theatre, and in 1991 he completed his play Piney Brown. He served as an advisory editor to literary magazines and served on grants panels for New York's Creative Artist Public Service Program (CAPS), the National Endowment for the Arts, the Coordinating Council for Literary Magazines (CCLM), the Kentucky Arts Council, and the Detroit City Arts Council. He was a member of the College Language Association, the Black Theatre Network, and the Langston Hughes Society.

Aubert died on January 7, 2014, in Trenton, New Jersey. An extensive collection of his personal correspondence, journals, manuscripts, awards, and publications is housed at the Xavier University of Louisiana, Archives & Special Collections.

== Early years and education ==
Aubert was born on March 12, 1930, in Lutcher, Louisiana. He attended Southern University in Baton Rouge, graduating with a bachelor's degree in English literature and a minor in French in 1959. Blyden Jackson, the chair of the English department, pushed Aubert to think about graduate school and a career in teaching when he was still an undergrad. He was awarded a Woodrow Wilson Fellowship to pursue graduate studies at the University of Michigan in Ann Arbor, where the following year he earned a master's degree in English literature. Aubert's work often reflected on his childhood and where he was from.

== Teaching career ==
Aubert first taught at Southern University in Baton Rouge, where he started as an instructor from 1960 to 1962, then became an assistant professor for the next three years. From 1965 to 1970, he was an associate professor of English. With 1970 as his last year at Southern University, he left and went to be associate professor at State University of New York College at Fredonia for four years and was then promoted to be the professor of English.

In 1975, Aubert founded Obsidian, which is a journal reviewing Black Literature. He originally funded it on his own but a few other individuals who liked the idea contributed as well. Aubert went to Wayne State University in Detroit, Michigan, in 1980, staying there for eight years. During his years there, he was a member of the board of directors of the Coordinating Council of Literary Magazines.

== Honors ==
Aubert was the recipient of honors that included two creative writing fellowship grants from the National Endowment for the Arts (1973 and 1981), an editor's fellowship grant in 1979 from the Coordinating Council of Literary Magazines for small press editing and publishing, the 1988 Callaloo Award for his contribution to Afro-American cultural expression, and the Xavier Activist for the Humanities Award.

== Works ==
- Against the Blues (1972)
- Feeling Through (1975)
- A Noisesome Music (1979)
- South Louisiana: New and Selected Poems (1985)
- If Winter Come: Collected Poems 1967–1992 (1994)
- Harlem Wrestler and Other Poems (1995)
