= Camille Dungy =

American writer

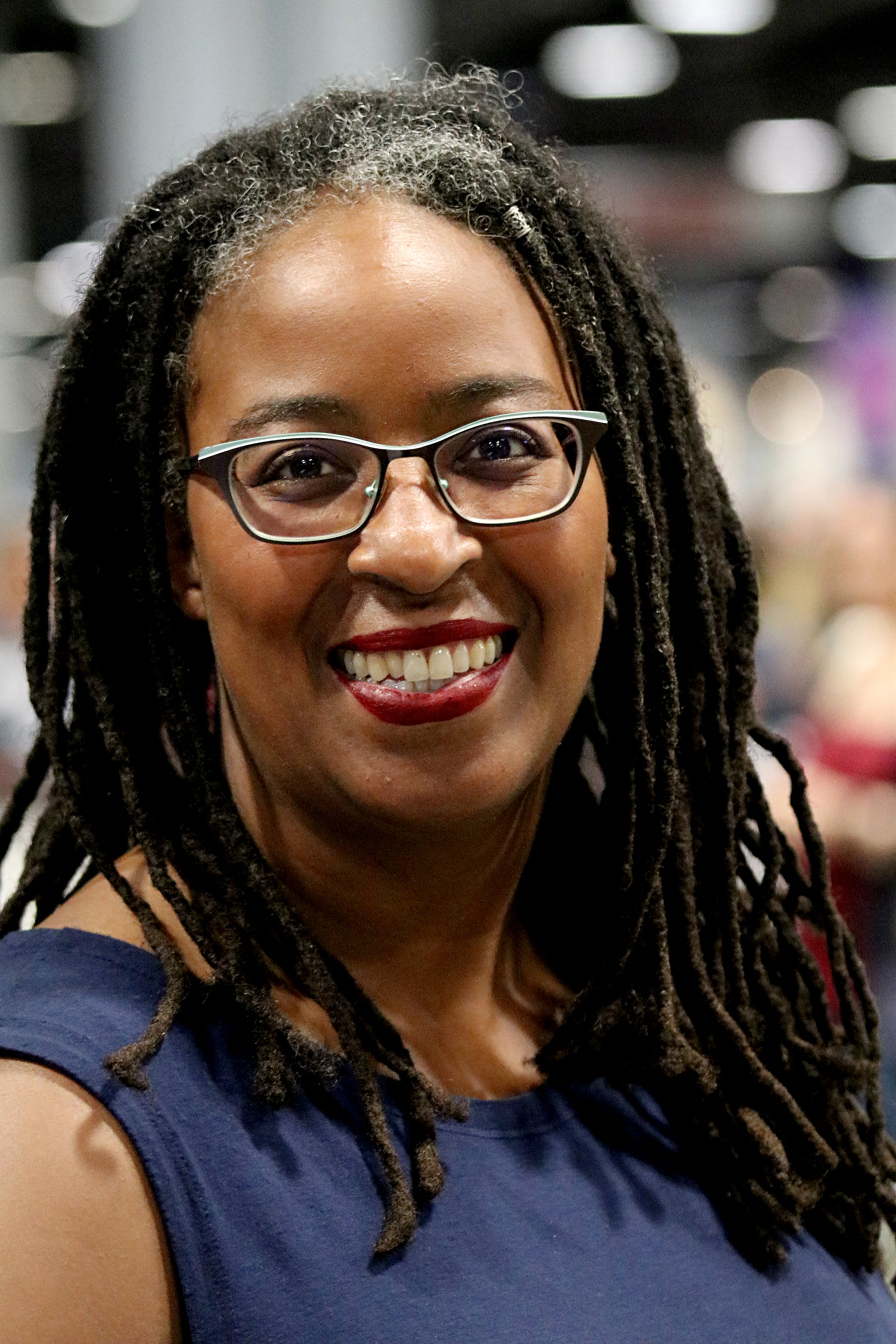
- Dungy at the 2018 U.S. National Book Festival
- Born: Camille T. Dungy; 1972 (age 53–54); Denver, Colorado, US
- Education: Stanford University; University of North Carolina, Greensboro
- Occupations: Poet and academic
- Writing career
- Genre: Poetry
- Website: camilledungy.com

Camille T. Dungy (born 1972) is an American poet and professor at Colorado State University.

== Early life ==
Born in Denver, Colorado, Dungy graduated from Stanford University (BA) and the University of North Carolina, Greensboro, where she earned her MFA.

== Career ==
She is the author of four poetry collections – Trophic Cascade (Wesleyan University Press, 2016), Smith Blue (Southern Illinois University Press, 2011), Suck on the Marrow (Red Hen Press, 2010) and What to Eat, What to Drink, What to Leave for Poison (Red Hen Press, 2006) – as well as a recent collection of essays entitled Guidebook to Relative Strangers (W.W. Norton, 2017). Dungy is editor of Black Nature: Four Centuries of African American Nature Poetry (UGA, 2009), co-editor of From the Fishouse: An Anthology of Poems that Sing, Rhyme, Resound, Syncopate, Alliterate, and Just Plain Sound Great (Persea, 2009), and assistant editor of Gathering Ground: A Reader Celebrating Cave Canem’s First Decade (University of Michigan Press, 2006). Her poems have appeared in literary journals and magazines, including The American Poetry Review, Poetry, Callaloo, The Missouri Review, Crab Orchard Review, Poetry Daily. She is also a contributor to Margaret Busby's 2019 anthology New Daughters of Africa.

Dungy's honors include fellowships from the National Endowment for the Arts, the Virginia Commission for the Arts, and the Bread Loaf Writers' Conference, Cave Canem, the American Antiquarian Society, and the Sewanee Writers' Conference, and she is the recipient of the 2011 American Book Award, a 2010 California Book Award silver medal, a two-time recipient of the Northern California Book Award, and a two-time NAACP Image Award nominee. Recently a professor in the Creative Department at San Francisco State University (2011–2013), she is currently a professor in the English Department at Colorado State University. In 2019, Dungy was awarded a Guggenheim Fellowship for her poetry.

== Awards ==
- 2024: Paul Engle Prize
- 2019: Guggenheim Fellowship
- 2013: Sustainable Arts Foundations Promise Award
- 2011: American Book Award
- 2011: California Book Award Silver Medal
- 2011: Northern California Book Award
- 2010: Crab Orchard Open Poetry Series
- 2010: Northern California Book Award
- 2007: Dana Award in Poetry
- 2003: National Endowment for the Arts Fellowship

== Published works ==
Full-length poetry collections

- Trophic Cascade, Wesleyan University Press, 2016
- Smith Blue, Southern Illinois University Press, 2011
- Suck on the Marrow, Red Hen Press, 2010
- What to Eat, What to Drink, What to Leave for Poison, Red Hen Press, 2006

Non-Fiction

- Soil: The Story of a Black Mother's Garden, Simon & Schuster, 2023
- Guidebook to Relative Strangers, W.W. Norton, 2017

Editor

- Black Nature: Four Centuries of African American Nature Poetry, University of Georgia Press, 2009
- Toi Derricotte; Cornelius Eady; Camille T. Dungy, eds. (2006). Gathering Ground: A Reader Celebrating Cave Canem's First Decade. University of Michigan Press, 2006. ISBN 978-0-472-06924-8. "Camille Dungy."
- Camille T. Dungy; Matt O'Donnell; Jeffrey Thomson, eds. (2009). From the Fishouse: An Anthology of Poems That Sing, Rhyme, Resound, Syncopate, Alliterate, and Just Plain Sound Great. Persea Books. ISBN 978-0-89255-348-8.

Anthologies

- Lucille Lang Day and Ruth Nolan (eds.), Fire and Rain: Ecopoetry of California. Scarlet Tanager Books, 2018
- Melissa Tuckey (ed.), Ghost Fishing: An Eco-Justice Poetry Anthology. University of Georgia Press, 2018
- Charles Rowell (ed.),Angles of Ascent: A Norton Anthology of Contemporary African American Poetry, New York: W. W. Norton, 2013
- Anne Fisher-Wirth and Laura-Gray Street (eds), The Ecopoetry Anthology, Trinity University Press, 2013. ISBN 978-1595341464
- Joshua Corey and G. C. Waldrep (eds), The Arcadia Project, Ahsahta Press, 2012
- New California Writing. Heyday Books, 2012
- Emily Rosko and Anton VanderZee (eds), A Broken Thing: Poets on the Line. The University of Iowa Press, 2011
- Alison Deming and Lauret Savoy (eds), The Colors of Nature: Culture, Identity, and the Natural World. Minneapolis, MN: Milkweed Editions, 2011
- Nikki Giovanni (ed.), The 100 Best African American Poems. Sourcebooks: 2010
- Julie Greicius and Elissa Bassist (eds), Rumpus Women, Vol. I, The Rumpus Book Club, 2010
- The Place That Inhabits Us: Poems from the San Francisco Bay Watershed. San Francisco, CA: Sixteen Rivers Press, 2010
- Nikky Finney, ed. (2007). "Dinah in the Box". The Ringing Ear: Black Poets Lean South. University of Georgia Press, 2007. ISBN 978-0-8203-2926-0.
- Gerry LaFemina; Chad Prevost, eds. (2006). Evensong: Contemporary American Poets on Spirituality. Bottom Dog Press, 2006. ISBN 978-1-933964-01-0.
