= Swamp Pink (magazine) =

American literary magazine

- Discipline: Literary magazine
- Language: English
- Edited by: Bret Lott, Emily Rosko, Anthony Varallo, and Jonathan Bohr Heinen

Publication details
- Former name: Crazyhorse
- History: 1960 to present
- Publisher: College of Charleston (United States)
- Frequency: Biannual

Standard abbreviations
- ISO 4: Swamp Pink

Indexing
- ISSN: 0011-0841

Links
- Journal homepage

Swamp Pink (stylized in lower case), formerly titled Crazyhorse from 1960 to 2022, is a biannual American literary magazine that publishes fiction, poetry, essays, translation and visual art. swamp pink has published literature since 1960, including the work of prominent authors such as John Updike, Raymond Carver, and Jorie Graham.

== History ==
Poet Thomas McGrath founded Crazyhorse in Los Angeles in 1960 and served as its managing editor in its early years. He named the magazine after the Lakota war leader Crazy Horse. Early issues appeared sporadically in the 1960s and early 1970s and had an anti-establishment bent. McGrath used the magazine as a platform to promote political change, calling for surrealistic poetry and unconventional writing, or “everything to help blow up the system.” At this time, the magazine used the heading "No More Cattlemen or Sheepmen—We Want Outlaws!"

By the end of the 1960s, McGrath moved the journal to New York, then to North Dakota State University and later Moorhead State University in Moorhead, Minnesota. By 1970, the magazine had moved to Murray State University in Kentucky, and McGrath resigned as editor. The journal was then helmed by a series of editors, first Philip Dacey, then Deb and Edith Wylder. A number of changes were implemented during this time. In addition to its original emphasis on poetry, the journal began publishing short fiction and critical essays. By the late 70s, Jorie Graham and James Galvin had become the journal's poetry editors, with Joe Ashby Porter serving as the fiction editor.

In 1981, Crazyhorse moved to the University of Arkansas at Little Rock, where it would stay until 2001. David Wojahn served as the poetry editor until 1986, when he was replaced by Ralph Burns, but he eventually returned after a two-year absence to work alongside poetry co-editors Lynda Hull and Dean Young. During this time, David Jauss served as fiction editor and Dennis Vannatta as criticism editor.

In 2001, after having served as sole editor of the journal for several years, Ralph Burns, through mutual friend Jauss, contacted Bret Lott at the College of Charleston to see if the College would be interested in taking over the journal due to its financial troubles at the University of Arkansas. The journal found a new home in Charleston, where the journal is currently edited by the College of Charleston Creative Writing faculty.

=== Name change ===
From 1960 to 2022 the magazine published under the name Crazyhorse after Lakota chief Crazy Horse. In 2022 the editors of the magazine issued a statement of forthcoming changes condemning the name as an act of appropriation, as the magazine was unaffiliated with the Lakota people, and announcing that the magazine would be rebranding. Since 2023, the magazine has been titled swamp pink, after a lily native to the Carolinas where the magazine is currently based.

== Publication ==
=== Publication and prizes ===
swamp pink is published twice yearly by the Department of English and the School of Humanities and Social Sciences at the College of Charleston in Charleston, South Carolina. The current editors are Bret Lott (non-fiction), Emily Rosko (poetry), Anthony Varallo (fiction), and managing editor Jonathan Bohr Heinen.

The magazine also sponsors the Lynda Hull Memorial Poetry Prize and the swamp pink Fiction Prize, awarding $2,000 and publication for a single piece of writing in each genre. Past fiction prize judges have included Joyce Carol Oates, Jaimy Gordon, Ann Patchett, Ha Jin, and Charles Baxter, and past poetry prize judges have included Carl Phillips, Billy Collins, Marvin Bell, and Mary Ruefle.

=== Accolades ===
In 1987, Library Journal ranked swamp pink among the top twenty magazines that publish poetry in the United States. In 1990, Writer's Digest named it one of the fifty most influential magazines publishing fiction. Work originally published in the magazine has been reprinted in the Best American Poetry, Best American Short Stories, Best American Nonrequired Reading, and Pushcart Prize annual anthologies.

=== Contributors ===
Contributors have included John Ashbery, Robert Bly, Ha Jin, Lee K. Abbott, Philip F. Deaver, Stacie Cassarino, W. P. Kinsella, Richard Wilbur, James Wright, Carolyn Forché, Charles Simic, Charles Wright, Billy Collins, Galway Kinnell, James Tate, and Franz Wright.

== See also ==
- List of literary magazines
