= Maureen Seaton =

American poet and professor

- Born: October 20, 1947; Elizabeth, New Jersey, U.S.
- Died: August 26, 2023 (aged 75); Longmont, Colorado, U.S.
- Education: Vermont College of Fine Arts
- Writing career
- Period: 1991-2023
- Notable awards: Lambda Literary Award, Audre Lorde Award, Pushcart Prize

Maureen Therese Seaton (October 20, 1947 – August 26, 2023) was an American lesbian poet, memoirist, and professor of creative writing. She authored fifteen solo books of poetry, co-authored an additional seventeen, and wrote one memoir, Sex Talks to Girls, which won the 2009 Lambda Literary Award for Lesbian Memoir/Biography. Seaton's writing has been described as "unusual, compressed, and surrealistic," and was frequently created in collaboration with fellow poets such as Denise Duhamel, Samuel Ace, Neil de la Flor, David Trinidad, Kristine Snodgrass, cin salach, Niki Nolin, and Mia Leonin.

== Background ==
Seaton received her MFA in Creative Writing from Vermont College of Fine Arts in 1996. She taught poetry workshops and served as Artist-in-Residence at Columbia College Chicago from 1993-2002, teaching concurrently in the MFA in Creative Writing program at the School of the Art Institute of Chicago from 1997-1999. She began teaching creative writing at the University of Miami in 2002, eventually serving as Director of the Creative Writing Program, and remained a faculty member there until her retirement in 2020. She was voted Miami’s Best Poet in 2020 by the Miami New Times.

== Publications ==
=== Solo work ===
==== Poetry ====
- The Sky is an Elephant. Redacted Books, 2023.
- Undersea. Jackleg Press, 2021.
- Sweet World. CavanKerry Press, 2019.
- Fisher. Black Lawrence Press, 2018.
- Tit, with Blue Guitar. Dancing Girl Press (chapbook), 2016.
- Fibonacci Batman: New and Selected Poems (1991-2011). Carnegie Mellon University Press, 2013.
- Genetics. Jackleg Press, 2012.
- Cave of the Yellow Volkswagen. Carnegie Mellon University Press, 2009.
- America Loves Carney. Sow's Ear (chapbook), 2009.
- Venus Examines Her Breast. Carnegie Mellon University Press, 2004.
- Little Ice Age. Invisible City Press, 2001.
- Miss Molly Rockin'. Thorngate Road (chapbook), 1998.
- Furious Cooking. University of Iowa Press, 1996.
- The Sea Among the Cupboards. New Rivers Press, 1992.
- Fear of Subways. The Eighth Mountain Press, 1991.

==== Prose ====
- Sex Talks to Girls: A Memoir. University of Wisconsin Press, 2008, 2018.

=== Co-authored poetry ===
- Tilt. Bridwell Press, 2025 (with Denise Duhamel).
- Beautiful People. Bridwell Press, 2025 (with Aaron Smith).
- Portals. Ravenna Press, 2025 (with Samuel Ace).
- How To Get Into Trouble, by Tres Abuelas y una Mamá. Anhinga Press, 2024 (chapbook, with Carolina Hospital, Nicole Hospital-Medina, and Holly Iglesias).
- A Questionnaire for Two Pussies. Extra Virgin Press, 2021 (chapbook, with Denise Duhamel).
- Zero-Zero. Hysterical Press, 2021 (chapbook, with Kristine Snodgrass).
- Myth America: Poems in Collaboration, by Tres Abuelas y una Mamá. Anhinga Press, 2020 (chapbook, with Carolina Hospital, Nicole Hospital-Medina, and Holly Iglesias).
- Road to the Multiverse. Ravenna Press (Triple Series #11), 2020 (chapbook, with Samuel Ace).
- Caprice: Collected, Uncollected, and New Collaborations. Sibling Rivalry Press, 2015 (with Denise Duhamel).
- Madame Curie’s Cookbook. Ravenna Press, 2014. (pamphlet, with Samuel Ace).
- Two Thieves & a Liar. Jackleg Press, 2012 (with Neil de la Flor & Kristine Snodgrass).
- Sinéad O'Connor and Her Coat of a Thousand Bluebirds. Firewheel Editions, 2011 (with Neil de la Flor).
- Stealth, Chax Press. 2011 (with Samuel Ace).
- Facial Geometry. NeoPepper Press, 2006 (chapbook, with Neil de la Flor & Kristine Snodgrass).
- Little Novels. Pearl Editions, 2002 (chapbook, with Denise Duhamel).
- Oyl. Pearl Editions, 2000 (chapbook, with Denise Duhamel).
- Exquisite Politics. Tia Chucha Press, 1997 (with Denise Duhamel).

=== Co-edited ===
- Reading Queer: Poetry in a Time of Chaos. Anhinga, 2018 (with Neil de la Flor).
- Saints of Hysteria: A Half-Century of Collaborative American Poetry. Soft Skull Press, 2007 (with Denise Duhamel & David Trinidad).

=== Tributes ===
- When I Was Straight: A Tribute to Maureen Seaton. Edited by Dustin Brookshire. Small Harbor Publishing, 2024.

== Awards and honors ==
- 2020 Miami New Times' Miami's Best Poet
- 2020 RHINO 2020's Editors' Prize ("4th Stage Metaphoric Breast Cancer").
- 2019 Florida Book Award for Poetry (Sweet World)
- 2015 The Best Small Fictions ("This Kind of Life Keeps Breaking")
- 2015 Fellow, U.S. National Parks, Devils Tower National Monument, Wyoming
- 2013 Best American Poetry ("Chelsea/Suicide")
- 2011 Sentence Book Award for Sinéad O'Connor and Her Coat of a Thousand Bluebirds (with Neil de la Flor)
- 2009 Winner, Sow's Ear Chapbook Competition for America Loves Carney
- 2008 Lambda Literary Award for Lesbian Memoir for Sex Talks to Girls
- 2005 Fellow, The Hermitage, Sarasota Arts Council, Manasota Key, FL
- 2005 Publishing Triangle's Audre Lorde Award for Lesbian Poetry for Venus Examines Her Breast
- 2001 Illinois Arts Council Literary Award (with Rhino) for "Toy Weather"
- 2001 Fellow, Ragdale Foundation, Lake Forest, IL
- 1998 Pushcart Prize in Poetry for "LA Dream #2"
- 1998 Illinois Arts Council Literary Award (with Spoon River Poetry Review) for "Confession"
- 1997 Fellow, Ragdale Foundation, Lake Forest, IL
- 1997 Best American Poetry ("Fiddleheads")
- 1997 Poetry Society of America & Illinois Arts Council, "A Chorus of Horizontals" appeared on Chicago subways and buses as a part of "Poetry in Motion."
- 1997 Illinois Arts Council Literary Award (with Another Chicago Magazine) for "Genetics"
- 1996 Pushcart Prize in Poetry for "Theories of Illusion"
- 1996 Lambda Literary Award for Lesbian Poetry for Furious Cooking
- 1996 Illinois Arts Council Literary Award (with Chicago Review) for "A Chorus of Horizontals"
- 1995 Iowa Poetry Prize for Furious Cooking
- 1995 Fellow, Ragdale Foundation, Lake Forest, IL
- 1994 Editors' Prize in Poetry (The Missouri Review)
- 1994 Illinois Arts Council Grant
- 1994 National Endowment of the Arts, Creative Writing Fellowship in Poetry
- 1994 Fellow, Ragdale Foundation, Lake Forest, IL
- 1993 The Society of Midland Authors Award for The Sea among the Cupboards
- 1993 Fellow, Ragdale Foundation, Lake Forest, IL
- 1992 The Capricorn Award for Poetry for The Sea among the Cupboards
- 1991 McAfee Discovery Award (The Missouri Review)
- 1990 The Eighth Mountain Press Poetry Prize for Fear of Subways
- 1987 Fellow, Ucross Foundation, Ucross, Wyoming
