= Emily Rosko =

American poet

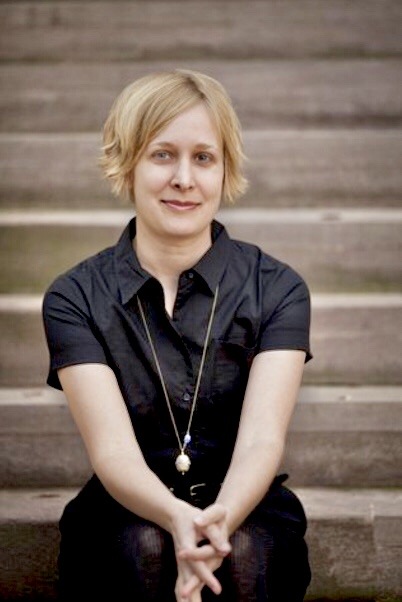

Emily Rosko (born 1979) is an American poet and is on the faculty of the College of Charleston. She is the author of Raw Goods Inventory (2006) and Prop Rockery (2012) poetry collections, both of which have won awards.

== Career ==
Rosko received her B.A. in English and Creative Writing from Purdue University where she studied with Marianne Boruch and Donald Platt. She earned her M.F.A at Cornell University under the mentorship of Alice Fulton, Ken McClane, Phyllis Janowitz, and Deborah Tall. She went on to complete a Ph.D. in English and Creative Writing working with Scott Cairns, Lynne McMahon, and Sherod Santos at the University of Missouri.

She taught previously as a Visiting Assistant Professor at Cornell University, and she is now Associate Professor at the College of Charleston in South Carolina.

Her first book Raw Goods Inventory won the 2005 Iowa Poetry Prize and her second book Prop Rockery was chosen by Natasha Saje for the 2011 Akron Poetry Prize. Her poems have appeared in New Orleans Review, Beloit Poetry Journal, New American Writing, The Denver Quarterly, and West Branch. Rosko is the poetry editor for Crazyhorse.

== Awards and fellowships ==
=== National prizes ===
- Akron Poetry Prize for a book-length collection, University of Akron Press, 2011.
- Glasgow Prize for Emerging Writers, Shenandoah, Washington and Lee University, 2007.
- Iowa Poetry Prize for a book-length collection, The University of Iowa Press, 2005.
- Dorothy Sargent Rosenberg Prize, 2004, 2006, 2011, and 2013.
- AWP Intro Journals Project Award, 2002.

=== Fellowships ===
- Wallace Stegner Writing Fellowship in Poetry, Stanford University, 2003–2005.
- Ruth Lilly Poetry Fellowship, Poetry, 2002.
- Jacob K. Javits Fellowship, U.S. Department of Education, 2001–2003.

== Bibliography ==
=== Books ===
- Rosko, Emily (2012). Prop Rockery. Akron University Press. ISBN 978-1-937378-15-8.
- Rosko, Emily (2006). Raw Goods Inventory. Iowa University Press. ISBN 9780877459804.

=== Edited collections ===
- Rosko, Emily; Vander Zee, Anton, eds. (2011). A Broken Thing: Poets on the Line. Iowa University Press. ISBN 9781609380540.

=== Essays ===
- "The Activated Voice." The Working Poet II: Fifty Writing Exercises and a Poetry Anthology. Ed. Scott Minar. DuBoos, PA: Mammoth Books (2014). 109-16. Print.
- "Recovery Project: On Visiting Rites by Phyllis Janowitz." Octopus Magazine 16. n. pg. Web. 1 Jan. 2014.
- "Mapping the Line." A Broken Thing: Poets on the Line. Emily Rosko and Anton Vander Zee, eds. Iowa City: University of Iowa Press (2011). 24-33.
- "The Complaint." Poets on Teaching. Joshua Marie Wilkinson, ed. Iowa City: University of Iowa Press (Fall 2010). 135-37.
