= Maureen N. McLane =

American poet, critic, and professor (born 1967)

- Born: December 24, 1967 (age 58)
- Occupation: Poet, critic, professor
- Education: Harvard University (BA); University of Oxford (BA); University of Chicago (PhD)

Maureen N. McLane (born December 24, 1967) is an American poet, critic, and professor. She received the 2002 National Book Critics Circle's Nona Balakian Citation for Excellence in Reviewing.

== Early life and education ==
Maureen N. McLane was raised in upstate New York. She received a BA from Harvard University in 1989, earned a Rhodes Scholarship to the University of Oxford where she received another BA in 1991, and got her PhD from the University of Chicago in 1997.

== Career ==
McLane is the author of five books of poetry. Her first full-length poetry collection, Same Life: Poems (Farrar, Straus & Giroux, 2008), was a finalist for the Lambda Literary Award for Lesbian Poetry and the Publishing Triangle Audre Lorde Award.

Her follow-up book, World Enough: Poems (Farrar, Straus & Giroux, 2010), was selected by Paul Muldoon in The New Yorker as a best poetry book of the year.

McLane achieved greater recognition with the publication of her hybrid criticism-memoir My Poets (Farrar, Straus and Giroux, 2012), which was a finalist for the 2012 National Book Critics Circle Award for Memoir and Autobiography. The Paris Review editor Lorin Stein called it "the survey course of my dreams." My Poets was lauded in The New York Times, NPR, The New York Observer, and The Boston Globe. Writing in Bookforum, Parul Sehgal remarked: "To read McLane is to be reminded that the brain may be an organ, but the mind is a muscle. Hers is a roving, amphibious intelligence; she's at home in the essay and the fragment, the polemic and the elegy."

This Blue (Farrar, Straus and Giroux, 2014) was a finalist for the National Book Award for Poetry.

She is the Henry James Professor of English and American letters at New York University. McLane has also been a contributor to Boston Review, The New York Times, Los Angeles Review of Books, Chicago Tribune, and The Washington Post. In 2023, she received the James Merrill House Fellowship.

== Awards ==
Year	Nominated Work	Award	Category	Result	Ref.
2002		National Book Critics Circle Awards	Nona Balakian Citation for Excellence in Reviewing	Winner	
2009	Same Life	Publishing Triangle Awards	Audre Lorde Award	Finalist	
2010	Same Life	Lambda Literary Awards	Lesbian Poetry	Finalist	
2012	My Poets	National Book Critics Circle Awards	Memoir and Autobiography	Finalist	
2012		New York University College of Arts and Science Golden Dozen Award		Winner	
2014	This Blue	National Book Awards	Poetry	Finalist	
2017	Some Say	The Believer Book Awards	Poetry	Shortlisted	
2018	Some Say	Publishing Triangle Awards	Audre Lorde Award	Finalist	
2021		New York University College of Arts and Science Golden Dozen Award		Winner	

== Bibliography ==
=== Poetry ===
==== Collections ====
- Same Life: Poems. Farrar, Straus & Giroux. 2008.
- World Enough: Poems. Farrar, Straus & Giroux. 2010.
- This Blue: Poems. Farrar, Straus & Giroux. 2014.
- Mz N: The Serial. Farrar, Straus & Giroux. 2016.
- Some Say: Poems. Farrar, Straus, & Giroux. 2017.
- What I'm Looking For: Selected Poems 2005-2017. Penguin. 2019.
- More Anon: Selected Poems. Farrar, Straus, & Giroux. 2021.

==== Poems ====
Title	Year	First published	Reprinted/collected
"Taking a walk in the woods after having taken a walk in the woods with you"	2013	The New Yorker. Vol. 89, no. 2. February 25, 2013.	

=== Non-fiction ===
- Romanticism and the Human Sciences: Poetry, Population, and the Discourse of the Species. Cambridge University Press. 2000.
- Balladeering, Minstrelsy, and the Making of British Romantic Poetry. Cambridge University Press. 2008.
- My Poets. Farrar, Straus & Giroux. 2012.
