= Susan Sherman =

American poet

Susan Sherman (born July 10, 1939) is an American author, poet, playwright, and a founder of IKON Magazine. Sherman's poems "convey the different voices of those who have felt the pang of suffering and burning of injustice."

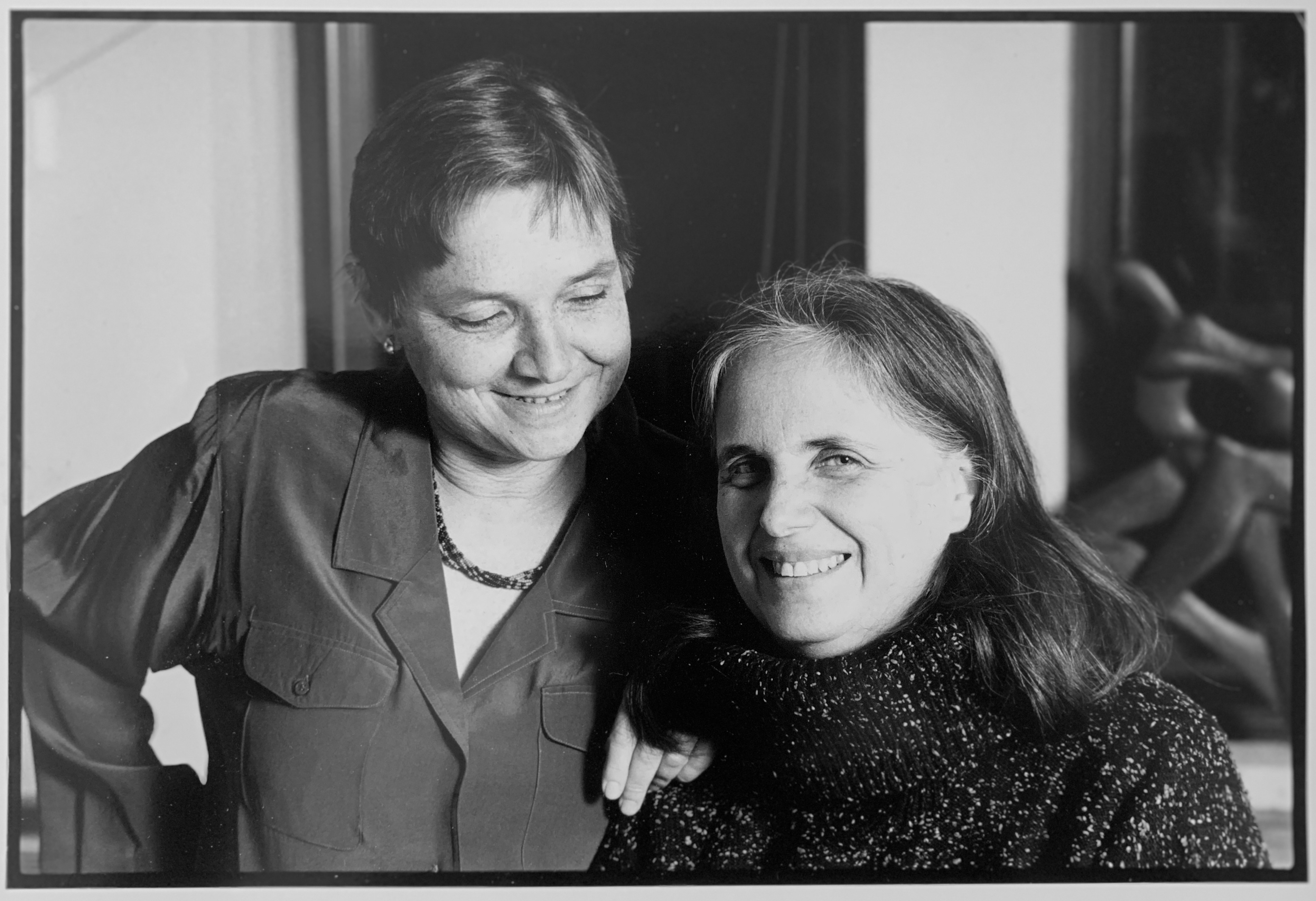
Adrienne Rich with Susan Sherman

== Biography ==
Susan Sherman was born in Philadelphia on July 10, 1939, to a first-generation Jewish American mother and father, a Russian Jewish immigrant. Sherman grew up in Los Angeles, California, and worked on her school's student newspaper in high school.

Sherman attended the University of California at Berkeley, majoring in philosophy and English and graduating with her BA in 1961. She began writing poetry at Berkeley, during the years of the San Francisco Renaissance, and won the university's Emily Chamberlain Cook Poetry Award in 1960. She also became politically active, taking part in demonstrations against the violence perpetrated on students during the House Un-American Activities police riots in San Francisco in 1960. She also received an MA from Hunter College in New York in 1967 in philosophy.

After graduating from Berkeley, Sherman moved to New York City and became active in the theater, poetry, and activist scenes of the East Village. She was involved in the literary circles at Les Deux Magots and Le Metro Café, and helped organize readings alongside Allen Katzman, Paul Blackburn, and Carol Bergé. Sherman served as the poetry editor for The Nation and The Village Voice, to which she also contributed theater reviews and classified ads. She first met writer Grace Paley while working at The Village Voice.

She continued to write reviews for many newspapers and periodicals including The Women's Review of Books, Cineaste Magazine and The New York Times Book Review. Her poetry has been featured in The Ladder, Judson Review, Intrepid, and Wormwood Review. In 1965, she taught at the opening of the Free University of New York (renamed the Free School) and later at the Alternate U.

Sherman was a founder and the editor of IKON magazine (first issue publication February, 1967), a journal devoted to the synthesis of art and political engagement, and the elimination of the authority of the critic as the arbiter of the creative process, and in the late 60s opened IKONbooks, an alternative bookstore which served as a cultural and movement center.

Starting in the early 60s, Sherman began writing plays. She has had twelve original plays produced at Hardware Poets Playhouse, La Mama ETC, Tribeca Labs, Good Shepherd Faith Presbyterian Church, and St. Clement's Space. Sections of her play "10 Lbs. of Ground" was shown on WCBS-TV, and her English adaptation from Spanish of Cuban playwright Pepe Carril's Shango de Ima, originally produced at La Mama ETC, was video-taped by Global Village for television. The Nuyorican Production won 11 AUDELCO awards in 1996.

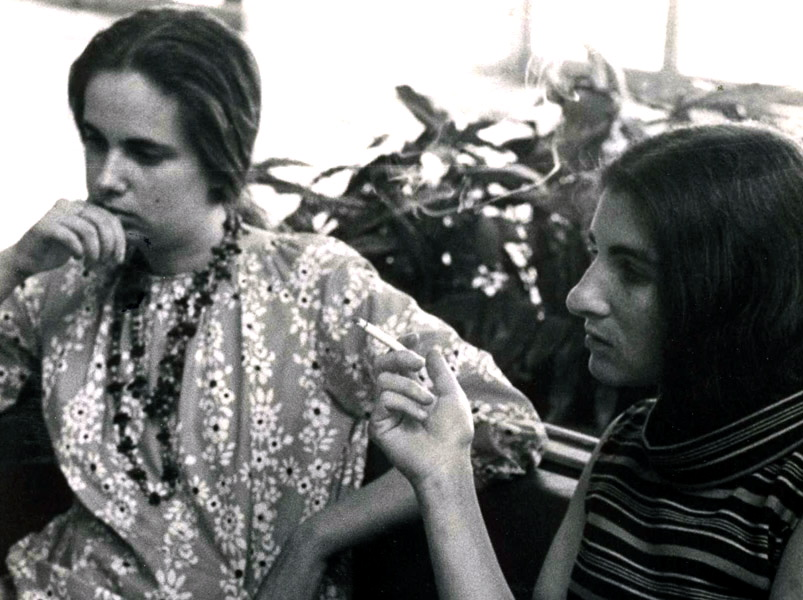
Susan Sherman and Margaret Randall at the Cultural Congress of Havana, 1968

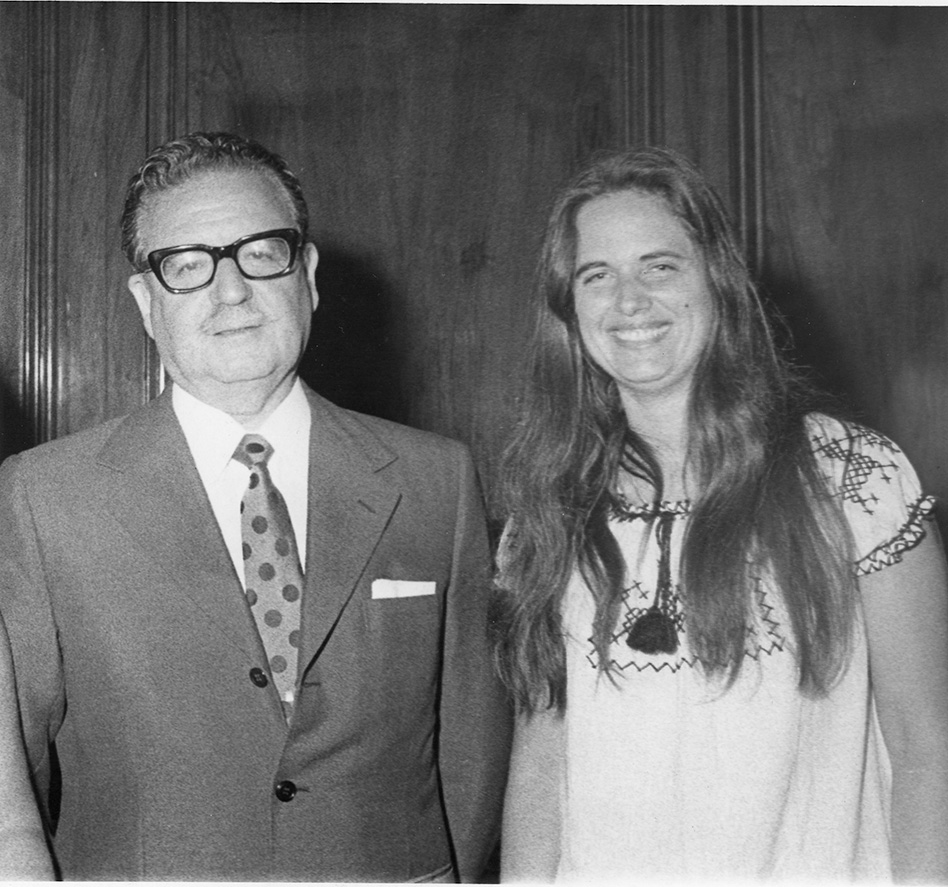
Susan Sherman and Chile President Salvador Allende

In 1967, she attended the Dialectics of Liberation conference at the Roundhouse in London where she took part in a panel with Jerome Rothenberg and was a featured reader along with poets that included Allen Ginsberg. She traveled to Cuba in 1968 to participate in the Cultural Congress of Havana and returned there for an extended stay a year later. During the Congress she gave a paper on Radical Education, and deepened what would be a life-long friendship with another Congress participant Margaret Randall, the editor of El Corno Emplumado, whose family she had stayed with in Mexico City before embarking for Cuba.

In 1970, Sherman was one of the organizers of the Fifth Street Women's Building feminist squatters action, after which she became active in the feminist movement and the Gay Liberation Movement. In the early 1970s, she also traveled to Chile while Salvador Allende was in power. In 1975, she taught at the Feminist institute Sagaris, and in 1984 she was invited to participate in a conference on Central America and traveled to Nicaragua with Adrienne Rich. In 1982, she revived IKON as a second series, this time as a feminist magazine which, like the first series, was dedicated to creativity and social change. After almost twenty years, she returned to Cuba in the 1990s as part of a feminist trip organized by Margaret Randall.

Her memoir of the Sixties, America's Child: A Woman's Journey through the Radical Sixties (Curbstone, November 2007) garnered critical acclaim from the New York Times Book Review, Booklist, Publishers Weekly and Lambda Book Review and numerous authors, including Grace Paley, Claribel Alegria and Chuck Wachtel, and in 2012, her new and selected poems, The Light that Puts an End to Dreams was a finalist for the Audre Lorde Lesbian Poetry Award.

From her early years in the 1980s as a part-time faculty member at The New School (Parsons School of Design and Eugene Lang College), she was active in union organizing, and has remained involved in the continuing struggle to speak to part-time faculty working conditions. Re-energized as ACT-UAW Local 7902, the union finally succeeded in their negotiations for a first contract in 2004.

== Publications ==
- Sherman, Susan; Martinez, Demetria (2025). Poetry in Dangerous Times: Two Women, Two Worlds. Abiquiú, NM: Casa Urraca Press. ISBN 9781956375336.
- Sherman, Susan (2014). Nirvana on Ninth Street. Framingham, MA: Wings Press. ISBN 978-1609404079. OCLC 882607542.
- Sherman, Susan (2012). The Light that Puts an End to Dreams: Selected Poems. Framingham, MA: Wings Press. ISBN 978-0916727949. OCLC 829969743.
- Sherman, Susan (2007). America's Child: A Woman's Journey through the Radical Sixties. Evanston, IL: Curbstone Press. ISBN 978-1931896351. OCLC 254027135.
- Susan Sherman Barcelona Journal, IKON 2007 0-945368-14-3, 978-945368-14-4
- Sherman, Susan (1998). Casualties of War, New Poems & Prose. Venom Press.
- Sherman, Susan (1990). The Color of the Heart: Writing from Struggle & Change 1959-1990. Evanston, IL: Curbstone Press. ISBN 0915306905. OCLC 22376289.
- Sherman, Susan; Hahn, Kimiko; Jackson, Gale (1988). We Stand Our Ground: Three Women, Their Vision, Their Poems. New York, NY: Ikon Inc. ISBN 0945368003. OCLC 17546117.
- Sherman, Susan (1975). Women Poems Love Poems. Brooklyn, NY: Two & Two Press. ASIN B001CJXO9M.
- Sherman, Susan (1974). With Anger/With Love: Selections, Poems and Prose 1963 - 1972. Mulch Press. ASIN B009NOL95O.
- Sherman, Susan (1963). Areas of Silence. Hespiridian Press/Hardware Poets Theater. OCLC 4862705.
- Susan Sherman. Shango de Ima, English adaptation of a Cuban play by Pepe Carril, Doubleday, 1969, 1970 LCCCN 78-130887

== Anthologies ==
- Art on the Line: Essays by Artists about the Point Where Their Art & Activism Intersect, (ed.) Jack Hirschman. Curbstone Press: 2001 1880684772, 978-1880684771
- Changer L'Amérique, Anthologie de la Poesie Protestataire des USA 1980-1995, Reunie par Eliot Katz et Christian Haye. Maison de la Poesie Rhone-Alpes, 1997
- Essays on the Line, ed. Jack Hirshman, Curbstone Press, 1997
- The Arc of Love, ed. Clare Coss. Scribner's, 1996 00684814469, 978-0684814469
- Poetry as Bread, ed. Martin Espada. Curbstone Press, 1994
- Lesbian Culture: An Anthology, ed. Penelope & Wolfe. Crossing Press, 1993 0895945916 978-0895945914
- Naming the Waves, ed. Christian McEwen. Crossing Press. 1988 0895943700, 978-0895943705
- An Ear to the Ground: An Anthology of Contemporary American Poetry, ed. Marie Harris and Kathleen Aguero. University of Georgia Press, 1989 0820311227, 978-0820311227
- Totem Voices: Plays from the Black World Repertory, ed. Paul Cater Harrison. Adaptation of Shango de Ima. Grove Press, 1988. 0802131263, 978-0802131263
- Ixok Amar-Go, Bilingual poetry anthology ed. Zoe Anglesey, Granite Press, 1987 0096148863, 978-0961488635

== Awards ==
- New York Foundation for the Arts Fellowship Creative Non-fiction Literature, 1997
- Puffin Foundation Grant, 1993
- Residency, Blue Mountain Center, Blue Mountain, New York, 1992
- New York Foundation for the Arts Fellowship, Poetry, 1990–1991
- New York State Council on the Arts' Editor's Award, 1986
- Coordinating Committee of Literary Magazines Editor's Grant, 1985
- Creative Artists Public Service Grant, Poetry, 1976–1977
- Emily Chamberlein Cook Poetry Prize, University of California, 1959–1960
