= Bob Morris (writer) =

American novelist (born 1950)

Robert Morris
- Born: May 25, 1950 (age 76); Orlando, Florida, U.S.
- Education: University of Florida
- Occupations: Novelist; Editor

Bob Morris (born May 25, 1950) is an American novelist who writes Caribbean-themed mysteries. He is also the author of several collections of nonfiction, including Gut Check, Short Road to Hell, The Man with the Fish on His Foot, All Over the Map, and The Whole Shebang. Morris is president of Story Farm, a custom publishing company that creates books, magazines and other publications for a wide variety of clients. He is an adjunct professor at Rollins College and teaches courses in food writing and crime fiction.

== Biography ==
Bob Morris is a fourth-generation Floridian who forsook the family farm – a fernery in Lake County – to pursue a career in journalism. The route was indirect. After failing two consecutive terms of organic chemistry, Morris decided he was not cut out to be a marine biologist and set out to travel around the world instead. His travels took him to a farming commune in Israel where his responsibilities included shoveling out the daily deposits of 12,000 chickens and 12,000 turkeys.

After graduating from the University of Florida, Morris went on to work at a number of newspapers, including the Florida Keys Free Press, the Fort Myers News-Press, the Orlando Sentinel, and the New York Times Regional Newspaper Group. Among his achievements is founding the annual Queen Kumquat Sashay, a parade in downtown Orlando founded in 1986 and discontinued in 1997. Morris and his family spent two years in Santa Barbara, California, where he created and launched AQUA, an international travel magazine for watersports enthusiasts. Upon returning to Florida in 1999, he was editor in chief of Caribbean Travel & Life magazine and Gulfshore Life magazine.

Now a freelance writer and editor, Morris continues to travel widely and contributes to a number of publications, including National Geographic Traveler, Bon Appétit, Islands, Robb Report, Latitudes and Men's Fitness. These travels have inspired his recent series of mystery novels from St. Martin's Press, each of which takes place on a different Caribbean island. The first one, Bahamarama, was released in November 2004 and was a finalist for the Edgar Allan Poe Award for Best First Mystery Novel and chosen by the Library Journal as one of the year's Top Five Mysteries. Morris's second novel, Jamaica Me Dead, was released in October 2005 and was a BookSense Pick by the American Booksellers Association. His third book, Bermuda Schwartz, a Florida Book Award bronze medal winner released in February 2007. His fourth book in the series, A Deadly Silver Sea, published in late 2008 and his fifth book in the series, Baja Florida, in January 2010.

== Bibliography ==
- Bahamarama (2004), ISBN 0-312-99747-7
- Jamaica Me Dead (2005), ISBN 0-312-99748-5
- Bermuda Schwartz (2007), ISBN 0-312-99749-3
- A Deadly Silver Sea (2008), ISBN 0-312-37725-8
- Baja Florida (2009), ISBN 0-312-37726-6
