= Thea Hillman =

American author and intersex activist

- Born: January 17, 1971 (age 55); San Francisco, California
- Education: Mills College; University of California, Santa Cruz
- Occupations: Author, Intersex activist
- Website: theahillman.com

Thea Hillman (born 1971) is an American intersex activist, poetry slam performer, and writer. Hillman was an early advocate for intersex rights in the United States and served as chair of the Intersex Society of North America board from 2002 to 2005. Her 2008 book, Intersex (For Lack of a Better Word), won the Lambda Literary Award for Transgender Literature.

== Early life and education ==
Thea Hillman was born in San Francisco, California, on January 17, 1971. She was born with congenital adrenal hyperplasia (CAH) which was treated with hormone therapy. It wasn't until age 28 that she came to the realization that CAH was an intersex condition, and she began considering her identity as an intersex person. Hillman endured invasive medical inspection of her body as a child, but also describes herself as "lucky" to have had parents who talked with her about her body, and not to have had medically unnecessary surgeries like many other intersex children.

Hillman attended the University of California, Santa Cruz and received a bachelor's degree in community studies in 1994. She earned an MFA from Mills College in 1999.

== Writing and performance ==
Hillman has performed slam poetry and participated in competitions for poetry and sudden fiction. She has been a two-time finalist in the San Francisco Poetry Slam Nationals. In 1998, she was the winner of the Tag-Team Haiku Competition at the Albuquerque Poetry Festival. She co-produced the first inclusive all-girls spoken word festival, ForWord Girls. During the 2001 National Queer Arts Festival, she produced "Intercourse: A Sex and Gender Spoken Word Recipe for Revolution," which showcased transgender and intersex writers. Hillman has toured and performed across the U.S. with artists such as Sister Spit.

She has written two books. Her first book, Depending on the Light, was rooted in her performance poetry and loosely based on her master's thesis. Sociologist and sexologist Carol Queen described it as a view "into the intricate insides of love and sex, safety and identity, the pleasures and dangers of urban life." Hillman's 2008 book, Intersex (For Lack of a Better Word), won the 2009 Lambda Literary Award for Transgender Literature. The book is a memoir in the form of short essays describing Hillman's experiences with sex, gender, family, and community.

== Activism ==
Hillman served as chair of the Intersex Society of North America board from 2002 to 2005. She was a key figure in the work of the San Francisco Human Rights Commission investigation into intersex issues, testifying during the first public hearing held on intersex issues in the United States in 2004. Hillman used her testimony to condemn the withholding of information about treatment from intersex children.

Hillman responded in essay form to the publication of the 2002 novel Middlesex by Jeffrey Eugenides after being asked about it during public speaking. She took the opportunity to highlight the voices of intersex adults, saying "We like to decide what happens to our bodies and like to be asked about our lives, rather than told. We've told our own stories in books, websites, newsletters, and videos. I can promise you they are far more moving and powerful than any fictionalized account. While the myth of Hermaphroditus has captured the imagination for ages, it traps real human beings in the painfully small confines of someone else's story."

In a report titled the "Homosexual Urban Myth," the conservative Christian organization Traditional Values Coalition referred to Hillman as a radical who "conducts erotic readings for homosexual groups" as part of the "homosexual revolution."

Hillman has said that her Jewish heritage has inspired her performance work.
