= Duriel E. Harris =

American poet, performer, and academic

Duriel E. Harris is an American poet, performer, sound artist, and scholar. She has written three poetry collections: Drag (2003), Amnesiac: Poems (2010), and No Dictionary of a Living Tongue (2017), and is known for her interdisciplinary work that integrates voice, music, visual art, and film. She is a professor of English at Illinois State University. She is editor of the literary journal Obsidian: Literature & Arts in the African Diaspora.

== Early life and education ==
Harris was born in Chicago, Illinois in 1969. She earned a bachelor's degree in Literature from Yale University, followed by a master's degree in English and American Literature from New York University. She received her Ph.D. in English from the University of Illinois Programs for Writers.

== Career ==
=== Poetry collections and recognition ===
Harris’s early work is included in Catch the Fire!!!, an anthology of contemporary African American poetry. She participated in C.C. Carter’s Black Pride Poetry Slam, covered by Windy City Times, underscoring her role in Chicago’s Black queer poetry scene.

Harris’s first collection, Drag, was published in 2003. Her poetry is also included in Bum Rush the Page, a Def Poetry Jam anthology. Her second book, Amnesiac, appeared in 2010 and explores themes of memory and trauma. In the Kenyon Review, critic Tamiko Beyer describes Drag as "a fiercely experimental and political collection" and says that "Amnesiac continues Harris’s work to make explicit the ways that linguistic, poetic experimentation can resist systems of oppression". Harris's third collection, No Dictionary of a Living Tongue, was published in 2017.

The poem “Before this dream” from No Dictionary of a Living Tongue was selected by former U.S. Poet Laureate Rita Dove for publication in The New York Times Magazine. The book has been critically praised for its use of hybrid poetic forms and its engagement with Black identity, gender, and language.

In addition to her books, Harris's individual poems have appeared in numerous literary journals. Her poem "Dream in Wartime" was published in the Kenyon Review in 2019.

In 2021, Harris contributed to Kore Press’s Postcards to the Future project, offering reflections on joy, radical self-acceptance, and resilience in a digital interview.

=== Interdisciplinary work and performance ===
Harris creates work that combines poetry, performance, sound, and visual media. She developed a solo performance piece titled Thingification, which explores the entanglements of race, capitalism, and embodiment. Critics praised its immersive, boundary-crossing approach. Windy City Times described the performance as one that “transports audiences through time and space by enacting their collective ritual participation in the struggle against Thingification,” with scenes shifting from a Deep South plantation porch to a gay dance club to underscore the oppressive force of objectification.

She also collaborated with filmmaker Scott Rankin on Speleology, a video-poetry installation. Her performance work has appeared at venues including the Chicago Jazz Festival and in collaboration with experimental musicians.

=== Projects and collaborations ===
Harris is a founding member of the Black Took Collective, an experimental performance group formed in 1999 during a Cave Canem retreat, alongside poets Dawn Lundy Martin and Ronaldo V. Wilson. The collective explores the intersections of Blackness, queerness, poetics, and performance, using hybrid forms to challenge dominant narratives and literary conventions. Their work blends critical theory, radical poetics, and embodied performance, positioning them at the forefront of Black experimental writing and performance art.

The Black Took Collective has presented its work at institutions and cultural events across the United States, including the Lannan Center for Poetics and Social Practice at Georgetown University, and California State University San Marcos, where their appearance was part of a series on race, art, and activism.

In 2022, Harris developed O|Sessions Black Listening, an Obsidian virtual performance masterclass exploring the role of listening and improvisation in Black creative practice, presented by the Poetry Foundation. The masterclass led to an online exhibition, O|Sessions Listening Room featuring participating visual artists, sound artists, and writers.

Harris contributed to the 2025 Magnitude & Bond field study on Black literary organizations, which was profiled in Nonprofit Quarterly for its underfunding of black writers and poets She is noted in Publishers Weekly as a contributor to the field study aimed at uplifting historically underresourced Black literary organizations.

=== Editorial and academic roles ===
Harris is the editor of Obsidian: Literature & Arts in the African Diaspora, a literary journal featuring work by Black writers and artists from around the world. Harris’s leadership at Obsidian: Literature & Arts in the African Diaspora was highlighted in WGLT’s 2021 report on the health and funding gaps in the Black literary arts sector.

She is a professor in the Department of English at Illinois State University, where she teaches creative writing, poetics, and African American literature. As a faculty member, Harris has been featured in university news articles, affirming her dual role as both educator and artist-scholar.

== Awards and honors ==
She was awarded the George Garrett Award for outstanding community service in literature and the Stephen E. Henderson Award for outstanding achievement in poetry.

== Selected bibliography ==
=== Books ===
- *Drag* (Elixir Press, 2003)
- *Amnesiac: Poems* (Sheep Meadow Press, 2010)
- *No Dictionary of a Living Tongue* (Nightboat Books, 2017)

=== Multimedia projects ===
- *Speleology* (video collaboration with Scott Rankin, 2011). Part of Spaces Gallery The Vault Exhibition November 2012 - January 2013
- *Thingification* (solo performance work)
