= Martha Serpas =

American poet

Martha Serpas (born 1965) is an American poet and educator. She has published a few poetry books and is a professor at the University of Houston Creative Writing Program.

== Biography ==
Serpas was born on December 10, 1965, in Galliano, Louisiana. She received her BA degree from Louisiana State University. She subsequently did graduate study at New York University (MA), Yale Divinity School (M.Div.), and the University of Houston (PhD).

Serpas formerly taught at the University of Tampa and is currently on faculty at the University of Houston Her first volume of poetry, Cote Blanche, appeared in 2002 from New Issues press at Western Michigan University; a second volume of poetry, "The Dirty Side of the Storm" was released by Norton in October 2006; and her third, "The Diener" was released by LSU Press in 2015. Her most recent volume is "Double Effect" by LSU Press. Her poems are included in Uncommonplace: An Anthology of Louisiana Poets (LSU Press); "The Art of the Sonnet" (Harvard); "Bearing the Mystery: The Best of Image"; and other anthologies. A 2005 issue of The New Yorker includes three of her poems. Additional poems are included in Harold Bloom's 2006 anthology "American Religious Poems." Two poems from "The Dirty Side of the Storm,"along with audio, are in the Winter 2006 issue of 2River.

== Bibliography ==
- Serpas, Martha (2002). Cote Blanche: Poems. First Book Series. New Issues Press / Western Michigan University. ISBN 9781930974180.
- Serpas, Martha (2007). The Dirty Side of the Storm: Poems. W. W. Norton & Company. ISBN 9780393062663.
- Serpas, Martha (2015). The Diener: Poems. Barataria Poetry. LSU Press. ISBN 9780807159224.
- Serpas, Martha (2020). Double Effect: Poems. Barataria Poetry. LSU Press. ISBN 9780807172759.
- Serpas, Martha (March 3, 2014). "The Best of Us". The New Yorker. Vol. 90, no. 2. pp. 48–49.
