= George Economou (poet) =

American poet and translator (1934–2019)

George Economou (September 24, 1934 – May 3, 2019) was an American poet and translator.

== Life ==
George Economou was born on September 24, 1934, in Great Falls, Montana, to Amelia Ananiadis Economou and Demetrios George Economou, both of whom emigrated to the United States from Greece. His father was a businessman and rancher. After primary and secondary school education in Great Falls, he attended Colgate University, where he majored in English and graduated cum laude and was elected to Phi Beta Kappa in 1956. He earned an M.A. in English Literature at Columbia University in 1957 and a Ph.D. in English and Comparative Literature in 1967, specializing in Old and Middle English and continental literature. He taught for 41 years at the Brooklyn Center of Long Island University (1961–83) and at the University of Oklahoma (1983–2000), where he served as Chair of the Department of English (1983–1990) and Director of Creative Writing (1990–2000). He was a founding editor of "The Chelsea Review" (1957–60) and co-founding editor of "Trobar" and Trobar Books (1960–64) with Robert Kelly.

He has published many books of poetry, translations, and scholarly criticism, and his work has appeared in many literary magazines and scholarly journals. He has lectured and given poetry readings at many universities and literary venues throughout the United States and abroad.

He married poet and playwright Rochelle Owens, June 17, 1962. They lived in Philadelphia and Wellfleet, Massachusetts. Mr. Economou died May 3, 2019, in Philadelphia.

His primary archive and papers are held at the Columbia University Rare Book and Manuscript Library. Smaller collections are held at the University of Michigan, Ann Arbor, and Princeton University.

== Awards ==
- American Council of Learned Societies, 1975.
- 1988 and 1999 Grant Awards: National Endowment for the Arts Creative Writing Fellowships in poetry.
- Rockefeller Bellagio Residency, May–June, 1993.

== Works ==
Poetry

- The Georgics. Black Sparrow. 1968.
- Landed Natures. Black Sparrow. 1969.
- Poems for Self-Therapy. Perishable Press. 1972.
- Ameriki: Book One, and Selected Earlier Poems. Sun. 1977. ISBN 978-0-915342-20-4.
- Voluntaries. Corycian Press Iowa City. 1984.
- harmonies & fits. Point Riders Press. 1987. ISBN 978-0-937280-19-5.
- Nashvillanelle & Other Rimes. Backwoods Broadsides Chaplets #16. 1996.
- Century Dead Center & Other Poems. Left Hand Books. 1997. ISBN 978-1-880516-23-2.
- Ananios of Kleitor. Shearsman Books. March 15, 2009. ISBN 978-1-84861-033-0.

=== Translations ===
- Euripides' "Cyclops," in The Tenth Muse: Classical Drama in Translation, ed. Charles Doria (Chicago/ Athens, Ohio: Swallow Press/ Ohio University Press, 1980), pp. 175–212.
- Philodemos, His Twenty-nine Extant Poems Translated into Contemporary American (Mount Horeb, Wisconsin: 1983).
- William Langland, "Piers Plowman, The C Version," a verse translation (Philadelphia: University of Pennsylvania Press, 1996). ISBN 0-8122-1561-3.
- Euripides' "Rhesus," in "Euripides,3," Penn Greek Drama Series, ed. David R. Slavitt and Palmer Bovie (Philadelphia: University of Pennsylvania Press, 1998), pp. 312–61. ISBN 0-8122-1650-4.
- I've Gazed So Much, poems by C. P. Cavafy (London: Stop Press, 2001). ISBN 0-9529961-9-7.
- Acts of Love, Ancient Greek Poetry from Aphrodite's Garden (New York: The Modern Library, Random House: 2006). ISBN 0-679-64328-1.
- Half an Hour & Other Poems, C. P. Cavafy (London: Stop Press, 2008). ISBN 0-9547603-1-X.

=== Editor ===
- George Economou, ed. (1978). Proensa: An Anthology of Troubadour Poetry. Translator Paul Blackburn. University of California Press. ISBN 978-0-520-02985-9.
- George Economou, ed. (1998). Poem of the Cid: a modern translation with notes. Translator Paul Blackburn. University of Oklahoma Press. ISBN 978-0-8061-3022-4.

=== Anthologies ===
- Dean Kostos (2008). Pomegranate Seeds: An Anthology of Greek-American Poetry. Somerset Hall Press. ISBN 978-0-9774610-4-2.

=== Criticism ===
- "George Economou on C.P. Cavafy Translations", Nomadics, May 10th, 2009
- George Economou (1975). Geoffrey Chaucer: a collection of original articles. McGraw-Hill. ISBN 978-0-07-018968-3.
