= Daphne Gottlieb =

San Francisco-based performance poet

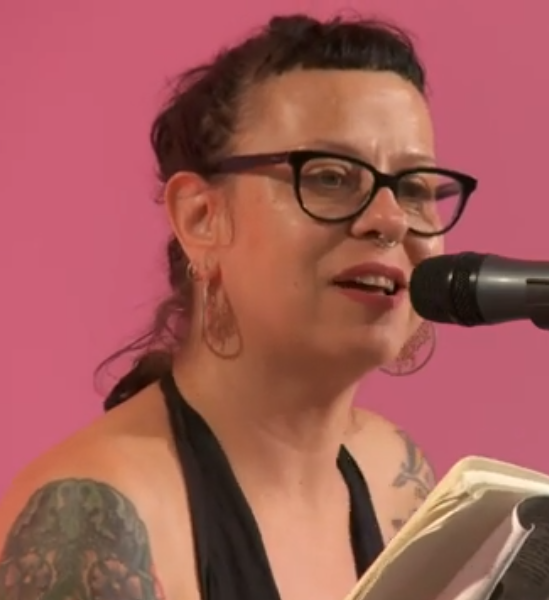
- Reading at the San Francisco Public Library in 2017
- Education: Mills College
- Occupation: Poet

Daphne Gottlieb is a San Francisco-based performance poet.

She is the winner of the Acker Award for Excellence in the Avant-Garde, the Audre Lorde Award for Poetry, the Firecracker Alternative Book Award, and a five-time finalist for the Lambda Literary Award. Critics have praised her work as "fierce," "unapologetic," "scorching" and "deliriously gutsy." Gottlieb is the author of 10 books in print: 5 books of poetry, 1 nonfiction book, 1 graphic novel, 1 book of short stories, and 2 anthologies. She has been widely published in journals including Utne Reader, Tikkun, nerve.com, McSweeney's, Exquisite Corpse and Instant City. Her work has appeared in a number of anthologies including Don't Forget to Write! (826 Valencia Books, 2005), Red Light: Saints, Sinners and Sluts (Arsenal Pulp Press, 2005), With a Rough Tongue: Femmes Write Porn (Arsenal Pulp, 2005) and Short Fuse: A Contemporary Anthology of Global Performance Poetry (Ratapallax, 2003). She is also the cover girl on San Francisco Noir (Akashic Books, 2005).

Besides anchoring three national performance poetry tours, featuring with Maggie Estep, Hal Sirowitz and Lydia Lunch, Gottlieb has also appeared across the country with the Slam America bus tour and with performance art collective Sister Spit. She has performed at festivals coast-to-coast, including South by Southwest, Bumbershoot, and Ladyfest Bay Area.

Until 2006, she served as the poetry editor of the online LGBT literary magazine Lodestar Quarterly. She was a co-organizer of ForWord Girls, the first spoken word festival for anyone who is, has been or will be a girl, which was held in September 2002.

Gottlieb has taught at Mills College, California Institute of Integral Studies, New College of California, and has also performed and taught creative writing workshops around the country, from high schools and colleges to community centers. She received her MFA from Mills College.

== Books ==
=== Author ===
- Pelt (Odd Girls Press, 1999)
- Why Things Burn (Soft Skull Press, 2001)
- Final Girl (Soft Skull Press, 2003)
- Kissing Dead Girls (Soft Skull Press, 2008)
- 15 Ways to Stay Alive (Manic D Press, 2012)
- Pretty Much Dead (Ladybox Books, 2015)

=== Editor ===
- Homewrecker: An Adultery Reader (Soft Skull Press, 2005)
- Fucking Daphne: Mostly True Stories and Fictions (Seal Press, 2008)
- Dear Dawn: Aileen Wuornos in her Own Words (Soft Skull Press, 2012)

== Awards and nominations ==
- Final Girl was the winner of the Audre Lorde Award in Poetry for 2003 from The Publishing Triangle.
- Final Girl was named one of The Village Voice's Favorite Books of 2003, and received rave reviews from Publishers Weekly, the San Francisco Chronicle and The Village Voice.
- Final Girl was nominated for a Bram Stoker Award by the Horror Writer's Association.
- Why Things Burn was the winner of a 2001 Firecracker Alternative Book Award (Special Recognition — Spoken Word) for 2001.
- Why Things Burn was a finalist for the Lambda Literary Award for 2001.
- Fucking Daphne: Mostly True Stories and Fictions was a nominee for the 2008 Lambda Literary Award
- Kissing Dead Girls was a nominee for the 2008 Lambda Literary Award

== Bibliography ==
- Pelt. Odd Girls Press, 1999.
- Why Things Burn. Soft Skull Press, 2001.
- Slut, 2003. (self-published zine)
- Destroyer of All Things #11 (or so), 2004. (self-published zine)
- Final Girl. Soft Skull Press, 2003.
- Homewrecker: An Adultery Anthology. Soft Skull Press, 2005. (editor)
- Jokes and the Unconscious: A Graphic Novel. Cleis Press, 2006. (Gottlieb, author; DiMassa, Illustrator)
- Kissing Dead Girls. Soft Skull Press, 2008.
- Fucking Daphne: Mostly True Stories and Fictions. Seal Press, 2008. (editor)
- 15 Ways to Stay Alive. Manic D Press, 2011

== See also ==
- Poetry slam
- Punk literature
