= Obsidian: Literature and Arts in the African Diaspora =

Literary magazine (founded 1975)

Obsidian
- Editor-in-chief: Duriel E. Harris
- Categories: Literary magazine
- Frequency: Biannually
- Founder: Alvin Aubert
- First issue: 1975; 51 years ago
- Company: University of Illinois Press
- Country: United States
- Website: obsidianlit.org
- ISSN: 2161-6140 (print); 0888-4412 (web)
- OCLC: 1368541089

Obsidian: Literature & Arts in the African Diaspora (sometimes referred to as Obsidian, Obsidian Lit or Obsidian: Literature and Arts in the African Diaspora) is a biannual literary magazine that was first published in 1975 by Alvin Aubert at SUNY Fredonia under the title Obsidian: Black Literature in Review. The magazine has undergone a number of name changes and publication venues over the years, before obtaining its current title in 2014 under editor-in-chief Duriel E. Harris. It is published by the Publications Unit at Illinois State University.

== History ==
The magazine was established by Alvin Aubert using his own funds and those of various benefactors. Since that time, it has published continuously through financial contributions from individuals, support from various educational institutions, and organizations including the National Endowment of the Arts. The magazine publishes new and established, emerging and contemporary work by artists across the African diaspora in artistic disciplines including literature, visual, sound, and mixed media. It is abstracted and indexed in the Modern Language Association Database.

== Awards ==
The periodical won the Parnassus Award for Significant Editorial Achievement in 2018 for volume 42, Speculating Futures: Black Imagination & the Arts.

In February 2021, it was approved for an National Endowment for the Arts Grants for Arts Projects award to support outreach to historically Black colleges and universities.

The magazine is one of the Community of Literary Magazines and Presses 2021 grant recipients of the Literary Magazine Fund, launched in 2019 with The Amazon Literary Partnership.

Obsidian was awarded the 2026 AWP Small Press Publisher Award at the AWP26 Conference and Bookfair in Baltimore.
