= 30th Lambda Literary Awards =

2018 literary awards ceremony

The 30th Lambda Literary Awards were held on June 4, 2018, to honour works of LGBT literature published in 2017. The list of nominees was released on March 6.

== Special awards ==
Category	Winner
Visionary Award	Edmund White
Judith A. Markowitz Emerging Writer Award	Jeanne Thornton, Mecca Jamilah Sullivan
Trustee Award	Roxane Gay

== Nominees and winners ==
Category	Winner	Nominated
Bisexual Fiction	Barbara Browning, The Gift	J.E. Sumerau, Homecoming Queens; Zoey Leigh Peterson, Next Year, for Sure; Andrea Lawlor, Paul Takes the Form of a Mortal Girl; Georgette Gouveia, The Penalty for Holding
Bisexual Non-Fiction	Roxane Gay, Hunger	Julene Tripp Weaver, Truth Be Bold: Serenading Life & Death in the Age of AIDS; Monica Meneghetti, What the Mouth Wants
Gay Fiction	John Rechy, After the Blue Hour	Ahmad Danny Ramadan, The Clothesline Swing; Édouard Louis, The End of Eddy; Nnanna Ikpo, Fimí Sílè Forever; John Boyne, The Heart's Invisible Furies; Andrew Sean Greer, Less; Matthew Lansburgh, Outside Is the Ocean; Joan Dempsey, This Is How It Begins
Gay Memoir/Biography	Chike Frankie Edozien, Lives of Great Men: Living and Loving as an African Gay Man	Parvez Sharma, A Sinner in Mecca: A Gay Muslim's Hajj of Defiance; Jonathan Alexander, Creep: A Life, a Theory, an Apology; José Antonio Rodríguez, House Built on Ashes; Kenny Fries, In the Province of the Gods; Alan Bennett, Keeping On Keeping On; Victor Corona, Night Class: A Downtown Memoir; Bill Goldstein, The World Broke in Two: Virginia Woolf, T.S. Eliot, D.H. Lawrence, E.M. Forster, and the Year that Changed Literature
Gay Mystery	Marshall Thornton, Night Drop	Marshall Thornton, Boystown 10: Gifts Given; Kate Sherwood, Long Shadows; Kim Fielding, Love is Heartless; C. S. Poe, The Mystery of the Curiosities; Mark Zubro, Ring of Silence; Michael Nava, Street People; Rhys Ford, Tramps and Thieves
Gay Poetry	C. A. Conrad, While Standing in Line for Death	Danez Smith, Don't Call Us Dead; Charif Shanahan, Into Each Room We Enter without Knowing; Tommy Pico, Nature Poem; Randall Mann, Proprietary; Cedar Sigo, Royals; Frederick Speers, So Far Afield; Chen Chen, When I Grow Up I Want to Be a List of Further Possibilities
Gay Romance	Laurie Loft, Love and Other Hot Beverages	L. A. Witt, At the Corner of Rock Bottom & Nowhere; Bryan T. Clark, Come to The Oaks; Audra North, Midlife Crisis; Johnny Diaz, Six Neckties; Tom Mendicino, Stealing Home; Adrienne Wilder, Wild; Christine D'Abo, Working It
Lesbian Fiction	Carmen Maria Machado, Her Body and Other Parties	Roxane Gay, Difficult Women; SJ Sindu, Marriage of a Thousand Lies; Anne Garréta, Not One Day; Leona Beasley, Something Better than Home; Chavisa Woods, Things to Do When You're Goth in the Country; Ariel Gore, We Were Witches; Patricia A. Smith, The Year of Needy Girls
Lesbian Memoir/Biography	Alexandria Marzano-Lesnevich, The Fact of a Body	Melissa Febos, Abandon Me; Eileen Myles, Afterglow, Eileen Myles; Renate Stendhal, Kiss Me Again, Paris; Anne-Christine d'Adesky, The Pox Lover: An Activist's Decade in New York and Paris
Lesbian Mystery	A. E. Radley, Huntress	Cari Hunter, A Quiet Death; Ellen Hart, Fever in the Dark; M. Redmann, The Girl on the Edge of Summer; Andrea Bramhall, The Last First Time; Kate Jessica Raphael, Murder Under the Fig Tree; Anne Holt, Odd Numbers; Jessica L. Webb, Repercussions
Lesbian Poetry	Rosamond S. King, Rock | Salt | Stone	Constance Merritt, Blind Girl Grunt; Sarah Pinder, Common Place; Dawn Lundy Martin, Good Stock Strange Blood; Ana-Maurine Lara, Kohnjehr Woman; Sina Queyras, My Ariel; Ife-Chudeni A. Oputa, Rummage; Jen Bervin, Silk Poems
Lesbian Romance	Yolanda Wallace, Tailor-Made	Rachel Spangler, Close to Home; Aurora Rey, Crescent City Confidential; Ann McMan, Goldenrod; Ann Roberts, Vagabond Heart; Yoshiyuki Ly, Venus and Lysander; Julie Cannon, Wishing on a Dream; Karis Walsh, You Make Me Tremble
LGBTQ Anthology	Juliana Delgado Lopera, ¡Cuéntamelo! Oral Histories by LGBT Latino Immigrants	Candace Walsh and Barbara Straus Lodge, Greetings from Janeland: Women Write More About Leaving Men for Women; Cat Fitzpatrick and Casey Plett, Meanwhile, Elsewhere: Science Fiction and Fantasy from Transgender Writers; Joamette Gil, Power & Magic: The Queer Witch Comics Anthology; Makhosazana Xaba and Karen Martin, Queer Africa 2: new stories; Charlie Craggs, To My Trans Sisters; Avi Ben-Zeev and Pete Bailey, Trans Homo...Gasp! Gay FTM and Cis Men on Sex and Love; Reina Gossett, Eric A. Stanley and Johanna Burton, Trap Door: Trans Cultural Production and the Politics of Visibility
LGBTQ Children's/Young Adult	Rebecca Podos, Like Water	Sarah Dooley, Ashes to Asheville; Christina Lauren, Autoboyography; April Daniels, Dreadnought: Nemesis; Nina Packebush, Girls Like Me; Kay Haring and Robert Neubecker, Keith Haring: The Boy Who Just Kept Drawing; Will Kostakis, The Sidekicks; Martin Wilson, We Now Return to Regular Life
LGBT Drama	Audrey Cefaly, The Gulf	Scott C. Sickles, Composure; Tom MacRae, Everybody's Talking About Jamie; Trey Anthony, How Black Mothers Say I Love You; Paula Vogel, Indecent
LGBTQ Erotica	Steve Berman, His Seed	L. A. Witt, The Master Will Appear; Siri Caldwell, Mistletoe Mishap; D. L. King, Unspeakably Erotic; Sacchi Green, Witches, Princesses, and Women at Arms
LGBTQ Graphic Novel	Emil Ferris, My Favorite Thing Is Monsters	Eric Kostiuk Williams, Condo Heartbreak Disco; Nicole J. Georges, Fetch: How a Bad Dog Brought Me Home; Gengoroh Tagame, My Brother's Husband, Volume 1; Tillie Walden, Spinning
LGBTQ Non-Fiction	Keeanga-Yamahtta Taylor, How We Get Free: Black Feminism and the Combahee River Collective	Avram Finkelstein, After Silence; Malik Gaines, Black Performance on the Outskirts of the Left: A History of the Impossible; Anne Elizabeth Moore, Body Horror: Capitalism, Fear, Misogyny, Jokes; Hida Viloria, Born Both: An Intersex Life; Myriam Gurba, Mean; Clayton Delery, Out for Queer Blood: The Murder of Fernando Rios and the Failure of New Orleans Justice; John Chaich and Todd Oldham, Queer Threads: Crafting Identity and Community
LGBTQ Science Fiction/Fantasy/Horror	Annalee Newitz, Autonomous	Lara Elena Donnelly, Amberlough; Maggie Shen King, An Excess Male; Rivers Solomon, An Unkindness of Ghosts; Kristen Ringman, I Stole You; Owen Keehnen, Night Visitors; Lindsey Drager, The Lost Daughter Collective; Nicky Drayden, The Prey of Gods
LGBTQ Studies	Trevor Hoppe, Punishing Disease: HIV and the Criminalization of Sickness	Alfredo Mirandé, Behind the Mask; Mari Ruti, The Ethics of Opting Out; Emily Hobson, Lavender and Red; Jaclyn Pryor, Time Slips; Ashley T. Shelden, Unmaking Love; David M. Halperin and Trevor Hoppe, The War on Sex; Julio Capó, Welcome to Fairyland
Transgender Fiction	Bogi Takács, ed., Transcendent 2: The Year's Best Transgender Speculative Fiction	Jeanne Thornton, The Black Emerald; Jennifer Finney Boylan, Long Black Veil; Tobi Hill-Meyer, ed., Nerve Endings: The New Trans Erotic; Amy Heart, Sugi Pyrrophyta and Larissa Glasser, eds., Resilience: Surviving in the Face of Everything
Transgender Non-Fiction	C. Riley Snorton, Black on Both Sides: A Racial History of Trans Identity	Rosalind Rosenberg, Jane Crow: The Life of Pauli Murray; Brice Smith, Lou Sullivan: Daring to Be a Man Among Men; Janet Mock, Surpassing Certainty; Sung Yim, What About the Rest of Your Life
Transgender Poetry	Ching-In Chen, recombinant	Kai Cheng Thom, a place called No Homeland; Juliana Huxtable, Mucus in My Pineal Gland; Julian Talamantez Brolaski, Of Mongrelitude; Kayleb Rae Candrilli, What Runs Over
