= Lambda Literary Award for Drama =

American literary award

- Awarded for: Literary Award for Drama
- Sponsored by: Lambda Literary Foundation
- Date: Annual
- Website: lambdaliterary.org/awards

The Lambda Literary Award for Drama is an annual literary award, presented by the Lambda Literary Foundation to an LGBTQ-related literary or theatrical work. Most nominees are plays, or anthologies of plays; however, non-fiction works on theatre or drama have also sometimes been nominated for the award.

== Honorees ==
Following is a list of winners and finalists of the Lambda Literary Award for Drama.

Year	Author	Title	Result	Ref.
1995	Tony Kushner	Angels in America: Perestroika	Winner	
1995	Cherrie Moraga	Heroes and Saints & Other Plays	Finalist	
1995	Paul Rudnick	Jeffrey	Finalist	
1995	Carolyn Gage	Second Coming of Joan of Arc	Finalist	
1995	David Drake	The Night Larry Kramer Kissed Me	Finalist	
1996	Tony Kushner	Slavs (Thinking About the Longstanding Problems of Virtue and Happiness)	Winner	
1996	Guinevere Turner and Rose Troche	Go Fish	Finalist	
1996	Terrence McNally	Love! Valour! Compassion!	Finalist	
1996	Michael Kearns	T-Cells and Sympathy	Finalist	
1996	Eric Lane and Nina Shengold (eds.)	The Actor's Book of Gay and Lesbian Plays	Finalist	
1997	Sue-Ellen Case	Split Britches	WInner	
1997	Michael Kearns	Acting=Life	Finalist	
1997	Rosemary Keefe Curb	Amazon All-Stars	Finalist	
1997	Holly Hughes	Clit Notes	Finalist	
1997	Mart Crowley	Three Plays by Crowley	Finalist	
1998	Moises Kaufman	Gross Indecency: The Three Trials of Oscar Wilde	Winner	
1998	Harry M. Benshoff	Monsters in the Closet	Finalist	
1998	Chay Yew	Porcelain and A Language of Their Own	Finalist	
1998	Jonathan Larson	Rent	Finalist	
1998	Lillian Schlissel	Three Plays by Mae West	Finalist	
1999	Holly Hughes	O Solo Homo	Winner	
1999	Jim Grimsley and David Roman	Mr. Universe and Other Plays	Finalist	
1999	D. A. Miller	Place For Us	Finalist	
1999	Sarah Schulman	Stagestruck: Theater, Aids, and the Marketing of Gay America	Finalist	
1999	Eve Ensler	The Vagina Monologues	Finalist	
2000	Craig Lucas	What I Meant Was	Winner	
2000	Terrence McNally	Corpus Christi	Finalist	
2000	Laurence Senelick	Lovesick	Finalist	
2000	Deb Margolin	Of All the Nerve	Finalist	
2000	Steven Watson	Prepare for Saints: Gertrude Stein, Virgil Thomson, and the Mainstreaming of American Modernism	Finalist	
2001	John Cameron Mitchell and Stephen Trask	Hedwig and the Angry Inch	Winner	
2001	Lisa Kron, Maureen Angelos, Dominique Dibbell, Peg Healey and Babs Davy	Five Lesbian Brothers	Finalist	
2001	Alina Troyano	I, Carmelita Tropicana	Finalist	
2001	Tom Donaghy	The Beginning of August	Finalist	
2001	Paul Rudnick	The Most Fabulous Story Ever Told	Finalist	
2002	No award presented			
2003	No award presented			
2004	Brian Drader	Prok	Winner	
2004	Ben Hodges	Forbidden Acts	Finalist	
2004	C. E. Gatchalian	Motifs & Repetitions & Other Plays	Finalist	
2004	Mart Crowley	The Band Plays	Finalist	
2004	Robert Schanke	Women in Turmoil: Six Plays	Finalist	
2005	Doug Wright	I Am My Own Wife	Winner	
2005	Donald Reuter	Fabulous!	Finalist	
2005	David Gere	How to Make Dances in an Epidemic	Finalist	
2005	Sharon Bridgeforth	love conjure/blues	Finalist	
2005	Claude J. Summers	The Queer Encyclopedia of Music, Dance and Musical Theater	Finalist	
2006	No award presented			
2007	Tim Miller	1001 Beds	Winner	
2007	Steven Fales	Confessions of a Mormon Boy	Finalist	
2007	Victor Bumbalo	Questa	Finalist	
2008	Steve Susoyev and George Birimisa (eds.)	Return to the Caffe Cino	Winner	
2008	Dan Bernitt	Dose: Plays & Monologues	Finalist	
2008	Victor Bumbalo	Niagara Falls	Finalist	
2009	Carolyn Gage	The Second Coming of Joan of Arc	Winner	
2009	Dan Bernitt	Phi Alpha Gamma	Finalist	
2009	Martin Duberman	Radical Acts: Collected Political Plays	Finalist	
2009	Scott Schofield	Two Truths and a Lie	Finalist	
2009	Vanda	Vile Affections	Finalist	
2010	Mart Crowley	The Collected Plays of Mart Crowley	Winner	
2010	Bonnie J. Morris	Revenge of the Women's Studies Professor	Finalist	
2010	Kate Moira Ryan and Linda S. Chapman	The Beebo Brinker Chronicles	Finalist	
2011	Maureen Angelos, Dominique Dibbell, Peg Healey and Lisa Kron	Oedipus at Palm Springs: A Five Lesbian Brothers Play	Winner	
2011	Octavio Solis	Lydia	Finalist	
2011	Daniel Talbott	Slipping	Finalist	
2011	Tarell Alvin McCraney	The Brother/Sister Plays	Finalist	
2011	Bryden MacDonald	With Bated Breath	Finalist	
2012	Peggy Shaw	A Menopausal Gentleman: The Solo Performances of Peggy Shaw	Winner	
2012	Anton Dudley	Letters to the End of the World	Finalist	
2012	Jonathan Tolins	Secrets of the Trade	Finalist	
2012	Jon Marans	The Temperamentals	Finalist	
2012	Madeleine George	The Zero Hour	Finalist	
2013	David Greenspan	The Myopia and Other Plays	Winner	
2013	Jon Marans	A Strange and Separate People	Finalist	
2013	A. Rey Pamatmat	Edith Can Shoot Things and Hit Them	Finalist	
2013	C. E. Gatchalian	Falling in Time	Finalist	
2013	A. Rey Pamatmat	Thunder Above, Deeps Below	Finalist	
2014	Michel Marc Bouchard	Tom at the Farm	Winner	
2014	Adelina Anthony	Las Hociconas: Three Locas with Big Mouths and Even Bigger Brains	Finalist	
2014	Djola Branner	sash & trim and other plays	Finalist	
2015	Robert O'Hara	Bootycandy	Winner	
2015	Daniel Pearle	A Kid Like Jake	Finalist	
2015	Adelina Anthony	The Beast of Times	Finalist	
2015	Samuel D. Hunter	The Whale	Finalist	
2015	Steve Yockey	Wolves	Finalist	
2016	Tanya Barfield	Bright Half Life	Winner	
2016	Jeanine Tesori and Lisa Kron	Fun Home	Finalist	
2016	Taylor Mac	Hir	Finalist	
2016	Deborah Salem Smith	Love Alone	Finalist	
2016	Bathsheba Doran	The Mystery of Love and Sex	Finalist	
2017	Robert O'Hara	Barbecue/Bootycandy	Winner	
2017	Lois Fine	Freda and Jem's Best of the Week	Finalist	
2017	Topher Payne	Perfect Arrangement	Finalist	
2018	Audrey Cefaly	The Gulf	Winner	
2018	Scott C. Sickles	Composure	Finalist	
2018	Tom MacRae	Everybody's Talking About Jamie	Finalist	
2018	Trey Anthony	How Black Mothers Say I Love You	Finalist	
2018	Paula Vogel	Indecent	Finalist	
2019	Mashuq Mushtaq Deen	Draw the Circle	Winner	
2019	Daniel Alexander Jones	Black Light	Finalist	
2019	Jen Silverman	Collective Rage: A Play in Five Betties	Finalist	
2019	Miranda Rose Hall	Plot Points in Our Sexual Development	Finalist	
2019	Erin Markey	Singlet	Finalist	
2020	Michael R. Jackson	A Strange Loop	Winner	
2020	Liza Birkenmeier	Dr. Ride's American Beach House	Finalist	
2020	Jordan Harrison	The Amateurs	Finalist	
2021	Yilong Liu	The Book of Mountains and Seas	Winner	
2021	Jacqueline Goldfinger	Babel	Finalist	
2021	Liza Birkenmeier and Jill Sobule	F*ck7thGrade	Finalist	
2021	Sarah Einspanier	House Plant	Finalist	
2021	R. Eric Thomas	Safe Space	Finalist	
2022	R. Eric Thomas	Mrs. Harrison	Winner	
2022	Daniel Alexander Jones	Love Like Light	Finalist	
2022	storäe michele	mama [rose.]	Finalist	
2022	Kheven LaGrone	Pillow Talk	Finalist	
2022	L M Feldman	Thrive, or What You Will {an epic}	Finalist	
2023	Ho Ka Kei (Jeff Ho)	Iphigenia and the Furies (On Taurian Land) & Antigone: 方	Winner	
2023	kai fig taddei	Duecentomila	Finalist	
2023	Sikivu Hutchinson	Rock 'n' Roll Heretic	Finalist	
2023	Tom Ford (writer) and Alex Syiek (music and lyrics)	The Show on the Roof	Finalist	
2023	Hansol Jung	Wolf Play	Finalist	
2024	James Ijames	Fat Ham	Winner	
2024	Adam Meisner	For Both Resting and Breeding	Finalist	
2024	Andrew Rincón	I Wanna Fuck Like Romeo and Juliet	Finalist	
2024	Milo Wippermann	Joan of Arkansas	Finalist	
2024	Harrison David Rivers	the bandaged place	Finalist	
2025	Makram Ayache	The Green Line (خطّ التماس)	Winner	
2025	Jesus I. Valles	Bathhouse.pptx	Finalist	
2025	Nick Green	Casey and Diana	Finalist	
2025	Karen Hartman	Goldie, Max & Milk	Finalist	
2025	Sarah Mantell	In the Amazon Warehouse Parking Lot	Finalist	
2026	Jordan E. Cooper	Ain't No Mo'	Winner	
2026	LM Feldman, translated by MoMo Holt	Another Kind of Silence	Finalist	
2026	Gina Femia	Mercutio Loves Romeo Loves Juliet Loves	Finalist	
2026	Jordan Tannahill	Prince Faggot	Finalist	
2026	Sarah Waisvisz	Heartlines: A Love Story	Finalist	
