= Carolina Actors Studio Theatre =

Theatre company in Charlotte, North Carolina, U.S.

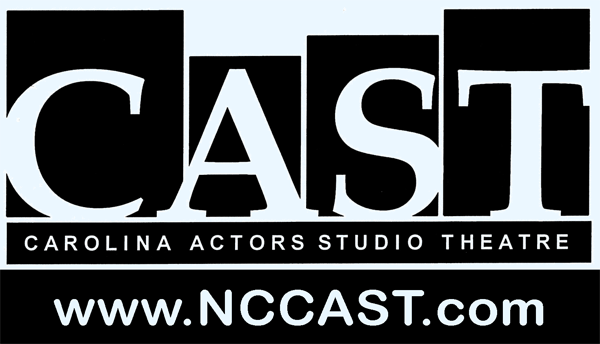
- Formation: 1992
- Type: Theatre Company
- Purpose: a culturally diverse theatre experience
- Headquarters: 2424 North Davidson, Charlotte NC 28205
- Region served: Charlotte, North Carolina
- Official language: English
- Artistic Director: Michael R. Simmons

Carolina Actors Studio Theatre (CAST) is an independent non-profit theatre company located at 2424 North Davidson Street in Charlotte, North Carolina. It was founded in 1992 by Charlotte acting instructor Ed Gilweit as an actor's teaching school. In 2000 Gilweit's company partnered with a video and stage production company run by Michael Simmons called Victory Pictures, Inc., and then with the fledgling theatre group Another Roadside Performance Company run by Robert Lee Simmons, Michael Simmons' son. Through this series of mergers, Gilweit and the Simmons' became the founders of the Carolina Actors Studio Theatre. After Gilweit's death in 2002, Michael Simmons became the Managing Artistic Director.

CAST was noted for large-scale installations and elaborate sets with the goal of complete immersion of the audience in the reality of each play. CAST always sought to obliterate the emotional distance between the actor and spectator, a technique they called "experiential theatre". When attending a CAST performance, the experience of the spectator began from the moment they entered—or even approached—the theater.

== History ==
In 2006, with the help of a board of directors recruited from Charlotte's arts community, CAST received a 501(c)(3) designation. Since 2008, CAST has also received financial support from the Arts & Science Council.

In the summer of 2010 CAST received a grant from the John S. and James L. Knight Foundation and the Arts & Science Council. This allowed the company to move out of the cramped quarters they had occupied for eight years on Clement Avenue into a space at 2424 North Davidson in the NoDa neighborhood of Charlotte where it had all begun. The new location at NoDa contained three theater spaces including a Thrust stage, and a Theatre in the round. For the first time in CAST history there was a spacious bar and lobby area, dressing rooms, storage rooms, a conference room, and a fully equipped scenery-building shop. The new theatre was officially launched in August 2011 with a production of August: Osage County, the Pulitzer Prize winning play by Tracy Letts. It was the regional premier of that play and was a great critical success.

Production history

The company in its several incarnations within Charlotte had a rather nomadic existence for the first five years of its existence. The first production (subUrbia) in 1998 had been at The Neighborhood Theatre at 501 East 36th Street. The company then moved successively to Ed Gilweit's CAST theatre at 3143 Cullman Avenue, the Matthews Community Center at 100 McDowell Street in nearby Matthews, the Hart-Witzen Gallery at 611 West 5th Street, and finally achieved a measure of geographical stability in January 2003 with a move to the CAST Theatre at 1118 Clement Ave where it would remain until June of 2011 when it moved to its final location, CAST Theatre at NoDa at 2424 North Davidson Street.

Starting with the 2011—2012 season all productions were at the CAST Theatre at NoDa.

2013—2014 Season

- Elemeno Pea by Molly Smith Metzler Aug 29—Sep 21
- Recent Tragic Events by Craig Wright Sep 12—Oct 12
- Good People by David Lindsay-Abaire Oct 17—Nov 16
- O Guru Guru Guru, or why I don't want to go to yoga class with you by Mallery Avidon Nov 22—Dec 14
- A Tuna Christmas by Jason Williams, Joe Sears, and Ed Howard Dec 04—Dec 22
- The Other Place by Sharr White Jan 09—Feb 01
- Boeing-Boeing by Marc Camoletti Jan 16—Feb 08
- Sizwe Banzi Is Dead by Athol Fugard Feb 21—Mar 15
- reasons to be pretty by Neil LaBute Mar 06—Mar 29
- The Last Days of Judas Iscariot by Stephen Adly Guirgis Apr 10—May 03
- Angels in America by Tony Kushner May 7—May 31
- Gruesome Playground Injuries by Rajiv Joseph June 5—June 21

2012—2013 Season

- Lombardi by Eric Simonson Aug 30—Sep 30
- Bengal Tiger at the Baghdad Zoo by Rajiv Joseph Oct 12—Nov 11
- 33 Variations by Moisés Kaufman Nov 23—Dec 23
- Frost/Nixon by Peter Morgan Jan 03—Jan 27
- The Elaborate Entrance of Chad Deity by Kristoffer Diaz Feb 21—Mar 23
- Miss Witherspoon by Christopher Durang Mar 28—Apr 27
- Proof by David Auburn May 09—Jun 01
- Assassins by Stephen Sondheim Jun 20—Jul 13

2011—2012 Season

- August: Osage County by Tracy Letts Aug 25—Sep 24
- Dr. Jekyll and Mr. Hyde by Jeffrey Hatcher Oct 13—Nov 05
- A Tuna Christmas by Jason Williams, Joe Sears, and Ed Howard Nov 25—Dec 24
- Jack Goes Boating by Robert Glaudini Jan 12—Feb 11
- Race by David Mamet Feb 23—Mar 24
- Floyd Collins by Adam Guettel and Tina Landau Apr 12—May 13
- The Edge of Our Bodies by Adam Rapp May 24—Jun 23

2010—2011 Season

- Steambath by Bruce Jay Friedman Sep 16—Oct 16 CAST Theatre at Clement Avenue
- The Elephant Man by Bernard Pomerance Oct 28—Nov 21 CAST Theatre at Clement Avenue
- The Day They Shot John Lennon by James McLure Dec 08—Dec 18 CAST Theatre at Clement Avenue
- When You Comin' Back, Red Ryder? by Mark Medoff Jan 27—Feb 12 CAST Theatre at Clement Avenue
- A Behanding in Spokane by Martin McDonagh Mar 03—Apr 04 CAST Theatre at Clement Avenue
- Agnes of God by John Pielmeier Apr 21—May 21 CAST Theatre at Clement Avenue
- Neon Psalms by Thomas Strelich Jun 16—Jul 16

2009—2010 Season

- Master Class by Terrence McNally Sep 10—Oct 03 CAST Theatre at Clement Avenue
- Marat/Sade by Peter Weiss Oct 22—Nov 21 CAST Theatre at Clement Avenue
- A Tuna Christmas by Jaston Williams, Joe Sears, and Ed Howard Dec 03—Dec 13 McGlohon Theatre at Spirit Square
- Our Lady of 121st Street by Stephen Adly Guirgis Jan 07—Feb 06 CAST Theatre at Clement Avenue
- Evie's Waltz by Carter Lewis Mar 04—Apr 03 CAST Theatre at Clement Avenue
- Welcome to the Monkey House by Kurt Vonnegut Apr 29—May 29 CAST Theatre at Clement Avenue
- Ice Fishing on Europa: A Festival of New Short Plays by various authors Jun 03—Jun 12 CAST Theatre at Clement Avenue
- Real Women Have Curves by Josefina Lopez Jul 15—Jul 31 CAST Theatre at Clement Avenue

2008—2009 Season

- Foxfire by Susan Cooper and Hume Cronyn Sep 11—Oct 04 CAST Theatre at Clement Avenue
- Monster: The True Story of Frankenstein by Mary Shelley—adaptation by Neal Bell Oct 30—Nov 15 CAST Theatre at Clement Avenue
- Savage In Limbo by John Patrick Shanley Dec 11—Dec 20 CAST Theatre at Clement Avenue
- A Tuna Christmas by Jaston Williams, Joe Sears, and Ed Howard Dec 19—Dec 28 McGlohon Theatre at Spirit Square
- Someone Who'll Watch Over Me by Frank McGuiness Jan 08—Jan 24 CAST Theatre at Clement Avenue
- Killer Joe by Tracy Letts Feb 12—Mar 07 CAST Theatre at Clement Avenue
- No Exit by Jean-Paul Sartre Apr 02—Apr 25 CAST Theatre at Clement Avenue
- Metamorphoses by Mary Zimmerman May 28—Jun 27 CAST Theatre at Clement Avenue

2007—2008 Season

- Autobahn by Neil LaBute Aug 09—Sep 09 CAST Theatre at Clement Avenue
- Omnium Gatherum by Theresa Rebeck and Alexandra Gersten-Vassilaros Sep 13—Sep 24 Duke Energy Theatre at Spirit Square—restaged
- Dracula by Bram Stoker—adaptation by Steven Dietz Oct 10—Nov 03 CAST Theatre at Clement Avenue
- A Tuna Christmas by Jaston Williams, Joe Sears, and Ed Howard Nov 28—Dec 09 McGlohon Theatre at Spirit Square
- Edmond by David Mamet Jan 24—Feb 23 CAST Theatre at Clement Avenue
- Dark Play by Carlos Murillo Mar 27—Apr 26 CAST Theatre at Clement Avenue
- Limbo by Glenn Hutchinson Jul 10—Jul 26 CAST Theatre at Clement Avenue

2006—2007 Season

- Neon Mirage by Liz Duffy Adams Sep 21—Oct 21 CAST Theatre at Clement Avenue
- A Tuna Christmas by Jaston Williams, Joe Sears, and Ed Howard Dec 21—Dec 31 McGlohon Theatre at Spirit Square
- Omnium Gatherum by Theresa Rebeck and Alexandra Gersten-Vassilaros Jan 11—Feb 03 CAST Theatre at Clement Avenue
- The Pavilion by Craig Wright Feb 22—Mar 09 CAST Theatre at Clement Avenue
- Some Girls by Neil LaBute Apr 12—May 12 CAST Theatre at Clement Avenue
- Topdog/Underdog by Susan-Lori Parks May 31—Jun 16 CAST Theatre at Clement Avenue
- American Buffalo by David Mamet Jun 28—Jul 28 CAST Theatre at Clement Avenue

2005—2006 Season

- A Few Good Men by Aaron Sorkin Sep 15—Oct 08 CAST Theatre at Clement Avenue
- Orange Lemon Egg Canary by Rinne Groff Oct 20—Nov 12 CAST Theatre at Clement Avenue
- Mrs. Bob Cratchit's Wild Christmas Binge by Christopher Durang Nov 24—Dec 25 CAST Theatre at Clement Avenue
- The Late Henry Moss by Sam Shepard Jan 12—Feb 04 CAST Theatre at Clement Avenue
- On the Verge by Eric Overmyer Feb 16—Mar 11 Central Avenue Playhouse on Clement Ave
- Act Without Words by Samuel Beckett, CAMERA by Jon Jory, Rembrandt's Gift by Tina Howe Jun 08—Jul 01 CAST Theatre at Clement Avenue

2004—2005 Season

- The Faculty Room by Bridget Carpenter Sep 08—Sep 28 CAST Theatre at Clement Avenue
- A Tree With Arms by James Saba, G.I. Joe by Ben Werling Oct 06—Oct 23 CAST Theatre at Clement Avenue
- Sans-Culottes in the Promised Land by Kirsten Greenidge Feb 09—Feb 26 CAST Theatre at Clement Avenue
- I'm Not Rappaport by Herb Gardner Apr 14—May 01 CAST Theatre at Clement Avenue
- Orphans by Lyle Kessler Jun 16—Jul 02 CAST Theatre at Clement Avenue
- Laughing Wild by Christopher Durang Jul 14—Jul 24 Duke Energy Theatre at Spirit Square

2003—2004 Season

- Kiss of the Spider Woman by John Kander and Fred Ebb Aug 14—Aug 23 CAST Theatre at Clement Avenue
- Finer Noble Gases by Adam Rapp Sep 10—Sep 27 Central Avenue Playhouse on Clement Ave
- Dear George: Letters to the President by Marcus Woollen Oct 28 Central Avenue Playhouse on Clement Ave
- Glengarry Glen Ross by David Mamet Jan 22—Feb 05 Central Avenue Playhouse on Clement Ave
- Laughing Wild by Christopher Durang Feb 18—Mar 06 Central Avenue Playhouse on Clement Ave
- White Man Dancing by Stephen Metcalfe May 13—May 29 Central Avenue Playhouse on Clement Ave
- Lenny's Back by Sam Bobrick and Julie Stein Jun 16—Jul 03 Central Avenue Playhouse on Clement Ave

2002—2003 Season

- Snapshot by various authors Sep 26—Oct 05 Hart Witzen Gallery
- Closet Land by Radha Bharadwaj, Twilight Zone by Rod Serling Oct 24—Nov 09 Hart Witzen Gallery
- Speed-the-Plow by David Mamet January Central Avenue Playhouse on Clement Ave
- The Colored Museum by George C. Wolfe Nov 12—Nov 23 Central Avenue Playhouse on Clement Ave
- Some Things You Need to Know Before the World Ends: A Final Evening with the Illuminati by Larry Larson and Levi Lee May 08—May 24 Central Avenue Playhouse on Clement Ave

2001—2002 Season

- One Flew Over the Cuckoo's Nest by Dale Wasserman, based on the novel by Ken Kesey Sep 06—Sep 30 Matthews Community Center
- Talking With... by Jane Martin Nov 01—Nov 17 Matthews Community Center
- The Good Doctor by Neil Simon Jan 10—Jan 27 Matthews Community Center
- Terra Nova by Ted Tally Mar 21—Apr 07 Matthews Community Center
- One Flew Over the Cuckoo's Nest by Dale Wasserman (restaged) May 16—Jun 02 McCelvey Center in York, South Carolina

2000—2001 Season

- Italian American Reconciliation by John Patrick Shanley Nov 02—Nov 19 CAST Theatre at Cullman Avenue
- The Good Doctor by Neil Simon Nov 30—Dec 17 CAST Theatre at Cullman Avenue

1999—2000 Season

- Tracers by various authors - organized by John DiFusco Nov 03—Nov 20 The Neighborhood Theatre
- Steambath by Bruce Jay Friedman Apr 19—Apr 30 The Neighborhood Theatre
- Steambath by Bruce Jay Friedman (restaged) May 04—May 07 CAST Theatre at Cullman Avenue
- Asylum by Arthur Kopit Jun 1—Jun 11 CAST Theatre at Cullman Avenue
- Oleanna by David Mamet Jul 20—Aug 6 CAST Theatre at Cullman Avenue

1998—1999 Season

- subUrbia by Eric Bogosian January 1998 The Neighborhood Theatre
- The Well of the Saints by John M. Synge May 5—May 22 The Neighborhood Theatre

On June 6, 2014 the board of directors of CAST announced that after 64 productions and eight years of operation as a non-profit theatre, the theatre would close. Reasons cited were financial pressures and dwindling attendance.

On June 21, 2014, despite winning the Charlotte Theatre of the Year award for three years running, and after a 24-year history, CAST shut its doors for what was presumed to be the last time with a final performance of Rajiv Joseph's Gruesome Playground Injuries.

== Revival ==
In 2025 Michael Simmons and CAST co-founder Dee Abdullah teamed up to revive CAST with a production of Alabaster by Audrey Cefaly at the Van Every Theatre in Charlotte. The play ran from February 27 to March 16.

A second play in the revival,The Sunset Limited by Cormac McCarthy, was presented at the JCSU Arts Factory (affiliated with Johnson C. Smith University) on September 11-25, 2025.

A third play in the revival, Maytag Virgin by Audrey Cefaly will be presented on October 16-31, 2026.

== Awards ==
Creative Loafing

Creative Loafing is a publisher of newsweeklies and their associated websites focusing on local affairs, including arts and entertainment. CAST twice won Creative Loafing's Theatre of the Year Award. CAST garnered many other awards from Creative Loafing including Best Drama and Best Director in addition to many technical awards. A complete list of Creative Loafing awards which CAST has won over the years is shown below.

Creative Loafing's Annual Charlotte Theatre Awards

2010

- Best Special Effects: Jeff Weeks and Robert Lee Simmons – Evie's Waltz
- Special Award: Project Art Aid, Rosalia Torres-Weiner, and Dulce Talvares for the Lobby Art Design of Real Women Have Curves
- 13th best play of 2010: The Elephant Man

2009

- Company of the year: for shows like Metamorphoses and Marat/Sade
- Best Drama: Metamorphoses
- Best Actor: Charles LaBorde – Metamorphoses (Bacchus, Poseidon, Philemon), Marat/Sade (Marquis de Sade)
- Best Director: Michael R. Simmons – Metamorphoses
- Best Lighting Designer: Michael R. Simmons and Camara McLaughlin – Metamorphoses
- Best Set Designer: Robert Lee Simmons and Michael R. Simmons – Metamorphoses
- Best Costume Designer: J. Dylan Stout, Maria Marciano, and Dot Marciano – Metamorphoses
- Best Sound Designer – Composer: Alex Mauldin – Marat/Sade
- Best Special Effects: Rosalyn Morris – Someone Who'll Watch Over Me (Installation Art and Middle East Artifacts)
- Best Female Cameo: Corlis Hayes – No Exit (Valet)
- 12th best play of 2009: Master Class
- 7th best play of 2009: Killer Joe
- 3rd best play of 2009: Marat/Sade
- Best play of 2009: Metamorphoses

2007

- Company of the year: for things like Topdog/Underdog, Autobahn, and Dracula – Carolina Actors Studio Theatre
- Theatreperson of the year: Robert Lee Simmons
- Actor of the year: Robert Lee Simmons
- Best Supporting Actor: Robert Lee Simmons – Omnium Gatherum (Mohammed)
- Best Lighting Designer: Michael R. Simmons – The Pavilion and Dracula
- Best Sound Designer: Red Davies – Omnium Gatherum
- 4th best play of 2007: American Buffalo
- 10th best play of 2007: Omnium Gatherum

2006

- Best Actress: Zillah Glory – On the Verge (Alexandra Cafuffle) wrong year for ours?????
- Best Actor: Tom Scott – Rembrandt's Gift (Rembrandt Van Rijn)
- Best Sound Designer: Michael R. Simmons and Natasha Parnian – Rembrandt's Gift
- 12th best play of 2006: The Late Henry Moss

2005

- Theatrepersons of the year: Michael Simmons
- Best Actor: Tom Scott – Orphans (Harold)
- Best Supporting Actor: Jonathan Ewart – Orphans (Phillip)
- 6th best play of 2005: Orphans
- 10th best play of 2005: Orange Lemon Egg Canary

2004

- Best Supporting Actor: Michael R. Simmons — Glengarry Glen Ross (Dave Moss)
- Best Sound Designer: Dean Kluesner and Michael Eld — The Faculty Room
- 15th best play of 2004: Laughing Wild

2003

- Best Director: Michael Simmons – Finer Noble Gases
- Best Supporting Actor: Michael Simmons – Speed-the-Plow (Charlie Fox)
- Newcomer of the Year: Derek Gamba – Finer Noble Gases (Chase)
- 12th best play of 2003: Kiss of the Spider Woman – Victory Pictures, Inc.

2001

- Best Actor: Alan McClintock – One Flew Over the Cuckoo's Nest (Randle P. McMurphy)
- Special Technical Effects: Ali Gharib, Dominic Demichina, and Robert Lee Simmons – One Flew Over the Cuckoo's Nest (Video Design)
- 9th best play of 2001: One Flew Over the Cuckoo's Nest – Victory Pictures, Inc.

Metrolina Theatre Association

The Metrolina Theatre Association (MTA) is a Charlotte organization which gives awards each year to support and advocate for local theatre, and these awards are the major source of public recognition for theatres, shows, and individuals. In 2009 Cast won the MTA award for Theatre Company of the Year and CAST's artistic director Michael R. Simmons won the award for Theatre Person of the Year. In 2011 CAST won the MTA awards for best show, actor, actress, and director. A complete list is shown below.

Metrolina Theatre Association awards

2012

- Theatre Company of the Year
- Outstanding Production: August: Osage County
- Outstanding Direction: Michael R. Simmons – August: Osage County
- Outstanding Lead Actor - Female: Polly Adkins (Violet Westin) – August: Osage County
- Outstanding Cameo: George Gray (Beverly Weston) – August: Osage County
- Outstanding Set Design: Dee Blackburn – August: Osage County

2011

- Outstanding Production: CAST – The Elephant Man
- Outstanding Direction: Michael Harris – The Elephant Man
- Outstanding Lead Actor - Male: Hank West (John Merrick) – The Elephant Man
- Outstanding Lead Actor - Female: Cynthia Farbman (Dr. Livingstone) – Agnes of God
- Outstanding Supporting Actor - Male: Charles LaBorde (Ross/Bishop How) – The Elephant Man
- Outstanding Supporting Actor - Female: Lauren Dortch Crozier (Sister Agnes) – Agnes of God
- Outstanding Cameo: Karina Roberts-Caporino (Cheryl) – When You Comin' Back Red Ryder
- Outstanding Set Design: Michael R. Simmons, Buddy Hanson, and Charles LaBorde – When You Comin' Back Red Ryder
- Outstanding Original Musical Composition: Matt Lavin – The Elephant Man
- Outstanding Properties Design: Buddy Hanson – When You Comin' Back Red Ryder
- Outstanding Properties Design: Buddy Hanson, Rob Simmons, and Alexis Casanova – A Behanding in Spokane

2010

- Outstanding Supporting Actor - Male: Sidney Horton (Rooftop) – Our Lady of 121st Street
- Outstanding Set Design: Robert Lee Simmons – Real Women Have Curves
- Outstanding Sound Design: Jay Thomas – Welcome to the Monkey House
- Outstanding Original Musical Composition: Alex Mauldin – Marat/Sade
- Outstanding Choreography: Amelia Hartsell and Buddy Hanson – Marat/Sade

2009

- Theatre Company of the Year
- Theatre Person of the Year: Michael R. Simmons
- Outstanding Production: Foxfire
- Outstanding Lead Actor – Male: Michael Harris (Edward) – Someone Who'll Watch Over Met
- Outstanding Lead Actor – Female: Paula Baldwin (Annie Nations) – Foxfire
- Outstanding Direction: Michael R. Simmons – Foxfire
- Outstanding Lighting Design: Michael R. Simmons and Camara McLaughlin – Metamorphoses
- Outstanding Sound Design: Alex Mauldin – Metamorphoses
- Outstanding Set Design: Mary Courtney Blake – Foxfire
- Outstanding Technical Effect: Robert L. Simmons and Michael R. Simmons for pool in the theatre – Metamorphoses
- Other Exemplary Performance/Element: The Stony Lonesome Boys – atmospheric music – Foxfire

2008

- Outstanding Special Technical Effect: Jay Thomas for driving projections on the – Autobahn
- Outstanding Exemplary Performance/Element: Michel Simmons for extended automotive design concept – Autobahn
- Outstanding Choreography: Christy Edney and Brenda Giraldo – Limbo

== Selected reviews ==
Selected Reviews
- Good People
- Recent Tragic Events
- Elemeno Pea
- Assassins
- Proof
- Miss Witherspoon
- The Elaborate Entrance of Chad Deity
- Frost/Nixon
- 33 Variations
- Bengal Tiger at the Baghdad Zoo
- Lombardi
- The Edge of Our Bodies
- Floyd Collins
- Jack Goes Boating
- Dr. Jekyll and Mr. Hyde
- August: Osage County
- Neon Psalms
- Agnes of God
- A Behanding in Spokane
- When You Comin' Back Red Ryder?
- The Day They Shot John Lennon
- The Elephant Man
- Steambath
- Real Women Have Curves
- Ice Fishing on Europa
- Welcome to the Monkey House
- Evie's Waltz
- Our Lady of 121st Street
- Marat/Sade
- Master Class
- Metamorphoses
- No Exit
- Someone Who'll Watch Over Me
- Savage In Limbo
- Monster: The True Story of Frankenstein
- Foxfire
- Limbo
- Dark Play
- Edmond
- A Tuna Christmas
- Dracula
- Omnium Gatherum
- Autobahn
- The Pavilion
- Rembrandt's Gift
- On the Verge
- The Late Henry Moss
- Mrs. Bob Cratchit's Wild Christmas Binge
- A Few Good Men
- The Faculty Room
- Lenny's Back
- White Men Dancing
- Glengarry Glen Ross
- Terra Nova
