= 10th Lambda Literary Awards =

1998 literary awards ceremony

The 10th Lambda Literary Awards were held in 1998 to honour works of LGBT literature published in 1997.

== Special awards ==
Category	Winner
Editor's Choice	Patricia Nell Warren, Billy's Boy
Pioneer Award	Ron Hanby, Bookazine
Publisher Service	Douglas Mitchell, University of Chicago Press

== Nominees and winners ==
10th Lambda Literary Awards winners and finalists
Category	Author/Editor	Title	Result
Anthologies (Fiction)	Robert Drake and Terry Wolverton (eds.)	His(2)	Winner
Anthologies (Fiction)	Brian Bouldrey (ed.)	Best American Gay Fiction 2	Finalist
Anthologies (Fiction)	Peter Burton (ed.)	The Mammoth Book of Gay Short Stories	Finalist
Anthologies (Fiction)	Christian McEwen (ed.)	Jo's Girls: Tomboy Tales of High Adventure, True Grit	Finalist
Anthologies (Fiction)	Tristan Taormino (ed.)	Best Lesbian Erotica 1997	Finalist
Anthologies (Nonfiction)	Gordon Brent Ingram, AnneMarie Bouthillette, and Yolanda Retter (eds.)	Queers in Space: Communities, Public Places, Sites of Resistance	Winner
Anthologies (Nonfiction)	Michael Lowenthal	Gay Men at the Millennium	Finalist
Anthologies (Nonfiction)	Rictor Norton	My Dear Boy: Gay Love Letters Through the Centuries	Finalist
Anthologies (Nonfiction)	Carol Queen and Lawrence Schimel (eds.)	PoMoSexuals: Challenging Assumptions About Gender and Sexuality	Finalist
Anthologies (Nonfiction)	Jess Wells	Lesbians Raising Sons	Finalist
Children's and Young Adult	Jacqueline Woodson	The House You Pass On the Way	Winner
Children's and Young Adult	Jeanne Arnold	Amy Asks a Question: Grandma, What's a Lesbian?	Finalist
Children's and Young Adult	Liza Ketchum	Blue Coyote	Finalist
Children's and Young Adult	Adam Mastoon	The Shared Heart	Finalist
Children's and Young Adult	Paul Monette	Sanctuary: a Tale of Life in the Woods	Finalist
Drama	Moises Kaufman	Gross Indecency: the Three Trials of Oscar Wilde	Winner
Drama	Harry M. Benshoff	Monsters in the Closet	Finalist
Drama	Jonathan Larson	Rent	Finalist
Drama	Lillian Schlissel	Three Plays by Mae West	Finalist
Drama	Chay Yew	Porcelain and A Language of Their Own	Finalist
Gay Memoir or Biography	Rafael Campo	The Poetry of Healing	Winner
Gay Memoir or Biography	Michael Klein	Track Conditions	Finalist
Gay Memoir or Biography	Felice Picano	A House on the Ocean, A House on the Bay	Finalist
Gay Memoir or Biography	Gary Schmidgall	Walt Whitman: a Gay Life	Finalist
Gay Memoir or Biography	Mark Thompson	Gay Body: a Journey Through Shadow	Finalist
Gay Fiction	Aryeh Lev Stollman	The Far Euphrates	Winner
Gay Fiction	Neil Bartlett	The House on Brooke Street	Finalist
Gay Fiction	Christopher Bram	Gossip	Finalist
Gay Fiction	Allan Gurganus	Plays Well With Others	Finalist
Gay Fiction	Edmund White	The Farewell Symphony	Finalist
Gay Mystery	David Hunt	The Magician's Tale	Winner
Gay Mystery	Christopher Bram	Gossip	Finalist
Gay Mystery	Michael Nava	The Burning Plain	Finalist
Gay Mystery	John Morgan Wilson	Revision of Justice	Finalist
Gay Mystery	R. D. Zimmerman	Hostage	Finalist
Gay Poetry	Cyrus Cassells	Beautiful Signor	Winner
Gay Poetry	Frank Bidart	Desire	Finalist
Gay Poetry	James Broughton, edited by Jim Cory)	Packing Up for Paradise: Selected Poems 1946-1996	Finalist
Gay Poetry	Tom Carey	Desire: Poems 1986-1996	Finalist
Gay Poetry	Justin Chin	Bite Hard	Finalist
Gay Studies	Charles Kaiser (ed.)	Gay Metropolis	Winner
Gay Studies	Martin Duberman	Queer Representations: Reading Lives, Reading Cultures	Finalist
Gay Studies	Gabriel Rotello	Sexual Ecology: AIDS and the Destiny of Gay Men	Finalist
Gay Studies	Michelangelo Signorile	Life Outside: The Signorile Report on Gay Men	Finalist
Gay Studies	Mark Thompson	Gay Body: a Journey Through Shadow to Self	Finalist
Humor	Bob Smith	Openly Bob	Winner
Humor	Alison Bechdel	Hot, Throbbing Dykes to Watch Out For	Finalist
Humor	Erika Lopez	Flaming Iguanas	Finalist
Humor	David Sedaris	Naked	Finalist
Humor	Sarah Strohmeyer	Barbie Unbound	Finalist
Lesbian Biography and Autobiography	Barbara Wilson	Blue Windows: a Christian Science Childhood	Winner
Lesbian Biography and Autobiography	Kim Chernin	My Life as a Boy	Finalist
Lesbian Biography and Autobiography	Hermione Lee	Virginia Woolf	Finalist
Lesbian Biography and Autobiography	Margaret Peters	May Sarton: a Biography	Finalist
Lesbian Biography and Autobiography	Daphne Scholinski and Jane Meredith Adams	The Last Time I Wore a Dress	Finalist
Lesbian Fiction	Elana Dykewomon	Beyond the Pale	Winner
Lesbian Fiction	Persimmon Blackbridge	Prozac Highway	Finalist
Lesbian Fiction	Blanche McCrary Boyd	Terminal Velocity	Finalist
Lesbian Fiction	Frankie Hucklenbroich	A Crystal Diary	Finalist
Lesbian Fiction	Ruthann Robson	A/K/A	Finalist
Lesbian Mystery	Randye Lordon	Father Forgive Me	Winner
Lesbian Mystery	Katherine V. Forrest	Apparition Alley	Finalist
Lesbian Mystery	Carole LaFavor	Evil Dead Center	Finalist
Lesbian Mystery	Jaye Maiman	Old Black Magic	Finalist
Lesbian Mystery	Cynthia Webb	No Daughter of the South	Finalist
Lesbian Poetry	Joan Larkin	Cold River	Winner
Lesbian Poetry	Eileen Myles	School of Fish	Winner
Lesbian Poetry	Pat Califia	Diesel Fuel	Finalist
Lesbian Poetry	Emma Donoghue	Poems Between Women	Finalist
Lesbian Poetry	Gerry Gomez Pearlberg	Queer Dog: Homo/Pup/Poetry	Finalist
Lesbian Studies	Lisa C. Moore	Does Your Mama Know?	Winner
Lesbian Studies	Susan K. Raffo	Queerly Classed	Finalist
Lesbian Studies	Catherine Reid and Holly Iglesias	Every Woman I’ve Ever Loved: Lesbian Writers on Their Mothers	Finalist
Lesbian Studies	Diana Souhami	Mrs. Keppel and Her Daughter	Finalist
Lesbian Studies	Arlene Stein	Sex and Sensibility	Finalist
Science fiction, fantasy or horror	Nicola Griffith and Stephen Pagel	Bending the Landscape	Winner
Science fiction, fantasy or horror	Harry M. Benshoff (ed.)	Monsters in the Closet	Finalist
Science fiction, fantasy or horror	Perry Brass	The Harvest	Finalist
Science fiction, fantasy or horror	William J. Mann Mann	Grave Passions	Finalist
Science fiction, fantasy or horror	Lawrence Schimel (ed.)	The Drag Queen of Elfland	Finalist
Small Press	Lisa C. Moore	Does Your Mama Know?	Winner
Small Press	Bruce Benderson	Toward the New Degeneracy	Finalist
Small Press	Justin Chin	Bite Hard	Finalist
Small Press	Elana Dykewomon	Beyond the Pale	Finalist
Small Press	Sarah Strohmeyer	Barbie Unbound	Finalist
Spirituality	Rebecca Alpert	Like Bread on the Seder Plate	Winner
Spirituality	Bruce Bawer	Stealing Jesus	Finalist
Spirituality	Randy P. Conner	Cassell's Encyclopedia of Queer Myth, Symbol, and Spirit	Finalist
Spirituality	Andrew Harvey	The Essential Gay Mystics	Finalist
Spirituality	Winston Leyland	Queer Dharma: Voices of Gay Buddhists	Finalist
Transgender	Carol Queen and Lawrence Schimel (eds.)	PoMoSexuals: Challenging Assumptions about Gender and Sexuality	Winner
Transgender	Daphne Scholinski and Jane Meredith Adams	The Last Time I Wore a Dress	Winner
Transgender	Pat Califia	Sex Changes	Finalist
Transgender	Annick Prieur	Mema's House, Mexico City: On Transvestites, Queens, and Machos	Finalist
Transgender	Riki Anne Wilchins	Read My Lips: Sexual Subversions and the End of Gender	Finalist
Visual Arts	Robert Giard	Particular Voices: Portraits of Gay and Lesbian Writers	Winner
Visual Arts	David Leddick	Naked Men: Pioneering Male Nudes 1935-1955	Winner
Visual Arts	Joani Blank	I Am My Lover: Women Pleasure Themselves	Finalist
Visual Arts	Anderson Jones and David Fields	Men Together	Finalist
Visual Arts	John Waters	John Waters: Director's Cut	Finalist
