= Autobahn (play) =

2003 play by Neil LaBute

Autobahn is a play written by Neil LaBute in 2003. It consists of seven short vignettes—each one involving just two people, and each one taking place entirely in the front seat of a car.

== Productions ==
Autobahn originally consisted of five one-act plays when it premiered as a benefit in March 2004 at the Manhattan Class Company. The cast included Kevin Bacon, Kieran Culkin, Brian Dennehy, Peter Dinklage, Philip Seymour Hoffman, Christopher Meloni, Amanda Peet, Susan Sarandon, Kyra Sedgwick, and Paul Rudd. The original five short plays were titled Bench Seat, Long Division, Road Trip, Autobahn, and Merge. Two more segments titled All Apologies and Funny were added to later productions.

Autobahn was presented in April 2008 at the Re-bar theatre in Seattle, Washington.

A production in 2009 by Theatre Jezebel at the Tron Theatre in Glasgow starred Sally Reid, Candida Benson, Alison Peebles, Johnny Austin, Lesley Hart, Ru Caddell and Angela Darcy. The Guardian called it "A masterclass in acting ... each dazzling performance seems to outshine the last"

Autobahn had its North Carolina regional premiere in August 2009 at the Carolina Actors Studio Theatre in Charlotte.

A recent production of "Autobahn" was put on by Underground Productions at the Schonell Theatre in Brisbane in 2013.
