= Anna Acton =

English actress

- Born: Anna Smith; 29 January 1977 (age 49); Marlow, Buckinghamshire, England
- Citizenship: British; American
- Occupation: Actress
- Years active: 2000–present
- Spouse: Ben Hull (m. 2007)
- Children: 2
- Relatives: Michael Acton Smith (brother)

Anna Smith (born 29 January 1977), known professionally as Anna Acton, is an English actress. She is known for her roles as Geri Evans in the Channel 5 soap opera Family Affairs, Rochelle Barratt in the ITV procedural series The Bill and DC Emma Summerhayes in the BBC soap opera EastEnders.

== Early and personal life ==
Acton was born as Anna Smith on 29 January 1977 in Marlow, Buckinghamshire. She holds both British and American citizenship. Her interest in acting began as a child in her friend's back garden, where her friend's mother held a small drama group.

Acton is married to actor and former Family Affairs co-star Ben Hull. They got married in 2007. The couple reside in Buckinghamshire and have two daughters.

== Career ==
Acton made her professional acting debut in a production of Cor, Blimey! at the Watford Palace Theatre in 2000. She continued making minor appearances in various projects, including her television debut as a guest character in the BBC soap opera EastEnders in 2001. Then, in 2002, she was cast as Geri Evans in the Channel 5 soap opera Family Affairs. She remained in the role until 2005, during which time she received a nomination for Best Actress at the British Soap Awards.

Following her role in Family Affairs, Acton was cast as Rochelle Barratt in the ITV1 procedural drama The Bill in 2005. She also appeared in two episodes of Doctors in 2006 and 2008, as well as an episode of the Channel 4 soap opera Hollyoaks. In 2007, she starred as Louise Martin in two episodes of HolbyBlue, followed by a role in Harley Street in 2008. From 2013 to 2015, Acton played the role of Joy in the CBeebies programme Topsy and Tim.

In 2014, she was cast in the BBC soap opera EastEnders, marking her second role in the soap. She portrayed DC Emma Summerhayes, a police officer investigating Lucy Beale's (Hetti Bywater) murder, until 2015 when the character was killed off. From 2015 to 2016, Acton appeared in the BBC medical series Casualty as Nikki Chisom. In 2018, she appeared in Birches, a UK-based feature based on the novel Silver Birches by Adrian Plass.

In 2018, Acton returned to theatre work, appearing in The Gulf at the Tristan Bates Theatre. A year later, she appeared in a production of The Permanent Way at the Vaults in London. In 2021, Acton appeared in an episode of the BBC soap opera Doctors as Vicki. In 2023, she returned to Casualty, this time in the guest role of Piper Fulley. A year later, she appeared in an episode of the Disney+ period series Rivals. Then in 2025, Acton appeared in a stage production of Blessings at the Riverside Studios in Hammersmith. 2026 saw her appear in the ITV1 thriller series Gone.

== Personal life ==
Her older brother Michael is an app developer.

== Filmography ==
=== Film ===
Year	Title	Role	Notes
2009	The Killers	Danielle	
2010	Little Deaths	Annabel	
2018	Degenerates	Susan Moore	
2019	Mapped	Izzy	Short film
2019	Birches	Jessica	
2020	Shapes	Ms Roberts	
2021	Smudged Smile	Laura	Short film
2025	Good Luck, Have Fun, Don't Die	Jillian	

=== Television ===
Year	Title	Role	Notes
2001	EastEnders	Jane Madden	2 episodes
2002–2005	Family Affairs	Geri Evans	Regular role
2005	The Bill	Rochelle Barratt	Main role
2006	Doctors	Rachel Cook	Episode: "Home from Home"
2006	Hollyoaks	D.C. Mullins	2 episodes
2007	HolbyBlue	Louise Martin	2 episodes
2008	Harley Street	Claudia	1 episode
2008	The Wrong Door	Various roles	Episode: "The Wizard of Office"
2008	Doctors	Kira Chesterton	Episode: "Hopelessly Devoted"
2010	The Little House	Ruth's Mother	1 episode
2011	Casualty	Alex Scotton	Episode: "The Ties That Bind"
2012	Crime Stories	Polly Andrews	1 episode
2013	Doctors	Dorothy Bale	Episode: "Goodbye Yellow Brick Road"
2013–2015	Topsy and Tim	Joy O’Dell	Main role
2014–2015	EastEnders	DC Emma Summerhayes	Regular role
2015–2016	Casualty	Nikki Chisom	Recurring role
2016	Doctors	Colette Pendleton	Episode: "Cold Facts"
2018	Doctors	Joanne Webber	Episode: "Playtime"
2019, 2023	Brassic	Lydia McCann	Recurring role
2020	Roadkill	Stella Faber	1 episode
2021	Doctors	Vicki	Episode: "This is Not a Pipe"
2023	Casualty	Piper Fulley	Episode: "The Ostrich Effect"
2024	Rivals	Mary Gordon-Lennox	1 episode
2026	Gone	Phillipa Dyce	1 episode

=== Video games ===
Year	Title	Role
2016	Hue	Hue's Mom (voice)

== Stage ==
Year	Title	Role	Venue
2000	Cor, Blimey!	Sally	Watford Palace Theatre
2007	Noises Off	Brooke Ashton	Liverpool Playhouse
2009	The Hokey Cokey Man	Jenny/Eileen	New End Theatre
2018	The Gulf	Betty	Tristan Bates Theatre
2019	The Permanent Way	Investment Banker/Second Bereaved Mother	The Vaults
2025	Blessings	Dorie	Riverside Studios

== Awards and nominations ==
Year	Award	Category	Nominated work	Result	Ref.
2002	British Soap Awards	Sexiest Female	Family Affairs	Nominated	
2003	British Soap Awards	Best Actress	Family Affairs	Nominated	
