= Robert Giard =

American photographer (1939–2002)

- Born: July 22, 1939; United States
- Died: July 16, 2002 (aged 62); United States
- Occupation: Photographer

Robert Giard (July 22, 1939 – July 16, 2002) was an American portrait, landscape, and figure photographer.

== Early life ==
Giard was a native of Hartford, Connecticut and grew up in a working-class household. He majored in English literature and received a B.A. from Yale University in 1961, then an M.A. in Comparative Literature from Boston University in 1965. For a time, he taught intermediate grades at the New Lincoln School.

== Career ==
By 1972, he began as a photographer, concentrating on landscapes of the South Fork of Long Island, portraits of friends, many of them artists and writers in the region, and the nude figure. In the beginning years of his career, Giard did much of his landscape photography during the late autumn, winter, and early spring when many of the fashionable houses of the Hamptons were boarded up for the season.

Giard continued photographing nudes, still lives, and landscapes throughout the rest of his career. The vast majority of Giard's photography was on black-and-white film. He used a twin-lens reflex Rolleicord camera on a tripod and did not use artificial lights. By the late 1970s, he started to teach photography at Southampton Community College.

=== Particular Voices ===
Ultimately, it would be in the area of the formal portrait that Giard's career made its most indelible mark. In 1985, Giard saw performances of two plays dealing with the AIDS crisis: Larry Kramer's The Normal Heart and William Hoffman's As Is. Giard felt compelled to photograph gay and lesbian writers in the face of death and societal oppression. He wanted to establish their literary history and cultural identity for the broader American public, which had refused to acknowledge either.

He documented queer figures in straightforward, unadorned, yet sometimes witty and playful portraits, focusing on a wide survey of significant gay and lesbian literary lights. The photos were taken in a wide variety of poses and settings, and often included people and pets who were close to the subjects. While some photographs were simple enough to be used as headshots for the artists, others revealed their homes or studios and highlighted important objects to them. Jameson Fitzpatrick, reviewing for Art in America, describes Giard's gaze as "dignifying and tender...what unifies Giard's portraits–single, double, and group alike–is his almost beatific vision: the silver way light graces skin."

By the time of his death, Giard had documented over 600 queer writers in this project. The majority of his subjects were white, but a significant number were writers of color. Although this project was initially named for its focus on gay and lesbian writers, it included some bisexual and trans writers as well. By the late 1990s, Giard relabeled the project as focusing on queer writers. Authors came from a variety of genres and popularity levels. He found subjects via a network of introductions, including referrals from the writers he had already photographed, until he was meeting artists well outside his original network. His portraits included such iconic figures as Edward Albee, Allen Ginsberg, and Adrienne Rich, as well as emerging novelists making their first mark, including Sapphire, David Leavitt, Shay Youngblood, and Michael Cunningham. A selection of these portraits, culled from the five hundred examples he had by then already amassed, was published by MIT Press in 1997 as the anthology Particular Voices: Portraits of Gay and Lesbian Writers, which then served as the companion volume to the New York Public Library's 1998 exhibition of the same name. The published anthology of Particular Voices won a Lambda Literary Foundation Award for Best Photography/Art Book in 1997.

Giard did much of his work by hand: carefully selecting the paper for prints, hand-printing in a small home studio, and spotting the works by hand to finish them. Before arriving at a writer's home to take their portrait, he would read their works. He then wrote them a letter to introduce himself, starting a correspondence about the authors' current works, whether they'd like to use his photos for their headshots, and whether Giard could exhibit their photos. Then he would eventually call them over the phone to arrange portraiture details, and finally travel to meet them for the image. Later, Giard added place-focused photography to his mission of documenting gay and lesbian writers. These locations included Oscar Wilde's tomb and various gay bars in San Francisco.

=== Later projects ===
In one final unfinished project, Giard was working on a portrait documentation of the grant recipients of the Thanks Be To Grandmother Winifred Foundation. Until 2001, the foundation supported projects by women 54 years and older that benefited other mature women. Grants supported research and artistic projects, as well as efforts to alleviate social, economic, and medical problems for women in a given locality. The foundation benefited 321 grant recipients from around the country and Giard, traveling the country by train, bus, and plane (he never had a driver's license) succeeded in photographing 241 of the women grantees by the time of his death. He kept a journal of his travels and documented his many visits to a richly diverse group of American women in small towns and major cities.

Queer Views was another final unfinished project: a series on early queer activists. Giard explicitly names trans activists as within its scope. He intended the series to focus on portraiture and important geographic locations, modulated by his own writings.

== Personal life and death ==
In 1974, Giard settled in Amagansett, Long Island, with his life partner, Jonathan Silin, an early childhood educator, where they remained for nearly thirty years until Giard's death. In the late 1970s and early 1980s, he participated in local organizing via the mixed-gender East End Gay Organization.

Giard died on July 16, 2002, at age 62. He was traveling from Minneapolis to Chicago by bus for a portrait session and apparently had a heart attack.

== Legacy ==
During his lifetime, Giard's work had been exhibited in solo and group exhibitions, earning awards and grants.

Some of his photographs are now in the collections of Brooklyn Museum, San Francisco Public Library, New York Public Library, and the Library of Congress. A complete archive of his work, journals, and ephemera is at the American Collection of the Beinecke Rare Book and Manuscript Library at Yale University. Jonathan Silin, Giard's life partner, donated the materials to the Beinecke.

The Robert Giard Foundation was formed in 2002 with the aim of preserving his photographic legacy, promoting his work for educational purposes, and encouraging young photographers. The annual Robert Giard Fellowship is a $10,000 grant to visual artists whose work addresses sexuality, gender, and issues of gay, lesbian, bisexual and transgender identity.
