= John Duryea =

American Roman Catholic priest

John Stillman Duryea (January 19, 1918 in San Francisco, California – July 22, 2006 in Oaxaca, Mexico), was a former priest in the Roman Catholic Church and an author of Alive into the Wilderness: An Autobiography.

== Biography ==
Duryea was trained at St. Patrick's Seminary in Menlo Park, California. He was ordained March 20, 1943 at St Mary's Cathedral in San Francisco by Archbishop John J. Mitty. He was assigned in 1943 as assistant pastor at St. Matthew in San Mateo. He served at Sacred Heart Church in Oakland from 1946 to 1950. Then assigned in 1950, as Catholic chaplain, first at San José State University and in 1961, Stanford University, where he became immensely popular and influential as the pastor of St. Ann's Chapel, Palo Alto.

According to the Palo Alto Weekly (July 25, 2006), he "became nationally famous, or infamous, for announcing on January 18, 1976, in his sermon at St. Ann's Chapel in Palo Alto that he had 'done the one thing the (Catholic Church) institution will not tolerate. I have fallen in love.'" That spring, he married artist Eve De Bona and became stepfather to her two daughters, Leslie and Ariel Gore. On the same day, he received a letter from the Archbishop of San Francisco, Joseph T. McGucken, informing him that he had been excommunicated by Pope Paul VI.

Following his dismissal from St. Ann's and excommunication from the Roman Catholic Church, Duryea founded the Angelo Roncalli Community, named for Pope John XXIII. He continued celebrating mass with that community on Sundays, for over twenty years, using University Lutheran Church in Palo Alto as its meeting place.

His autobiography, Alive into the Wilderness: An Autobiography, was published in 1985.

John Duryea retired to Oaxaca, Mexico, in 2001. He died "a self-directed death" at the age of 88 on July 22, 2006 in Oaxaca, Mexico.

== Family ==
His brother, Robert Francis Duryea, Jr (1921–2001), also a priest in the Roman Catholic Church, was excommunicated in 1971 and laicized after having disclosed a seven-year marriage (Lualan Adele O'Connor) and five-year-old child (Paul Robert Duryea).

== Qualities ==
In addition to normal priestly duties, Duryea practiced a unique "ministry of the wilderness". He led numerous hiking and backpacking trips open to all, regardless of church affiliation or outdoor experience.

Duryea was an amateur photographer of above-average talent whose subject was the wilderness he loved and the people who visited it with him. He used an old-fashioned large, heavy Rolleiflex twin-lens reflex camera that produced medium format 6 cm (2.4 in) square slides. His friends have selected a few hundred of the best of his thousands of slides, scanned them, and made the images available on the web.
