= LM Feldman =

American playwright

- Born: Lauren Feldman
- Education: Cornell University; Yale University (MFA)
- Website: www.laurenfeldman.com

LM Feldman (formerly Lauren Feldman) is an American playwright known for her (Note: Feldman uses any pronouns. For consistency, this article uses she/her pronouns.) play, Thrive, or What You Will [an epic].

== Early life and education ==
Feldman graduated from the Cornell University Department of Performing & Media Arts in 2001. She was assigned a writing assignment as part of an acting class. The teacher recommended that she take a playwriting class, which led to Feldman discovering a love for playwriting. She completed her MFA in Playwriting at the Yale University School of Drama.

== Career ==
In 2016, Feldman taught playwriting for PlayPenn.

Feldman read Glynis Ridley’s The Discovery of Jeanne Baret, and began writing Thrive, or What You Will [an epic] about the life of Jeanne Baret and inspired by Twelfth Night, Or What You Will. Thrive was the winner of the American Shakespeare Centre's Shakespeare’s New Contemporaries award in 2020 as well as a finalist for the 2022 Lambda Literary Award for Drama and an honorable mention on The Kilroys' List in 2019.

Feldman was named a 2023-25 Venturous Playwright Fellow, alongside Harmon dot aut and Jessica Huang, by The Playwrights’ Center and Venturous Theater Fund.

== Works ==
Full-length plays

- The Egg-Layers (2012)
- Grace, or the Art of Climbing (2013)
- a People [a mosaic play] (2018)
- Tropical Secrets, or All the Flutes in the Sea, adapted from the book Tropical Secrets by Margarita Engle (2021)
- S P A C E
- Scribe, or The Sisters Milton, Or Elegy for the Unwritten (formerly Amanuensis)
- Another Kind of Silence
- Thrive, or What You Will [an epic] (2022)
- hand foot hand

Devised works

- The Life and Works of JC as Told by the Heretics (formerly The Apocryphal Project) – devised with Michael Walkup, Brian Hastert, Carter Gill, and Alex Knox (2007)
- Now/Not Now {a one-woman play with trapeze} – devised with Diana Y Greiner (2011)
- Lady M – devised with director Adrienne Mackey (2011)
- And If You Lose Your Way, or A Food Odyssey – devised with Pirronne Yousefzadeh, Nick Choksi, and the ensemble (2014)
- Gumshoe (2017)
- War of the Worlds: Philadelphia – devised with Swim Pony and created in collaboration with the Drexel Entrepreneurial Game Studio (2017)

== Awards and nominations ==
Year	Award	Category	Work	Result	Ref.
2020	Shakespeare’s New Contemporaries (American Shakespeare Centre)	n/a	Thrive, or What You Will [an epic]	Won	
2022	Lambda Literary Awards	Drama	Thrive, or What You Will [an epic]	Nominated	
