= Hip Mama =

- Editor: Amanda Englund
- Frequency: Semi-quarterly
- Founder: Ariel Gore
- First issue: December 1993
- Country: United States
- Based in: Portland, Oregon
- Language: English
- Website: www.hipmamazine.com
- ISSN: 1074-195X

Hip Mama: The Parenting Zine is an American quarterly periodical covering the culture and politics of parenting. The magazine is widely credited with launching the contemporary mothers' movement. It has won the Alternative Press Award.

The first issue of Hip Mama was published in December, 1993, in Oakland, California, by the founding editor Ariel Gore as a forum for single, urban and feminist mothers. Gore edited Hip Mama for 15 years. Hip Mama relaunches in 2014 with expanded food, arts, and political coverage. The magazine is now published in the East Bay.
