= Born Both =

2017 memoir by Hida Viloria

Born Both: An Intersex Life
- Author: Hida Viloria
- Genre: Memoir
- Publisher: Hachette Book Group
- Publication date: March 14, 2017
- Pages: 352
- ISBN: 978-0-316-34784-6

Born Both: An Intersex Life is a 2017 memoir by Hida Viloria. It primarily deals with Vilora's intersex identity and activism for intersex rights.

== Summary ==
Born Both follows Viloria's life in a vignette format, from childhood to first learning about what being intersex is from a newspaper at age 26 and subsequently becoming an intersex rights activist as an adult. The book also details Viloria's non-binary and gender fluid identity and relationships within the LGBTQIA community, and Viloria uses the neopronouns "s/he" and "he/r" throughout the book.

== Reception ==
Kirkus Reviews called Born Both a "relentlessly honest and revealing memoir," further stating it "affirms the right of all intersex and nonbinary people to receive dignity and respect." Publishers Weekly, while describing the dialogue and the use of the present tense as "clunky at times" and criticizing the limited background explanation given for some of the organizations and events depicted in the book, concluded that it was a "valuable resource for those seeking first-person narratives by intersex people."

Barrie Olmstead of Library Journal wrote "this brave and empowering book deserves a wide audience." Jennifer Rothschild of School Library Journal gave particular attention to the text's discussion of pronouns and intersex terminology, and noted that despite dealing with various serious subject matter the book's tone was "hopeful."

Born Both was a finalist for the 2018 Lambda Literary Award for Nonfiction at the 30th Lambda Literary Awards.
