= Christine Montross =

American medical doctor and writer (born 1973)

Christine Elaine Montross (born 1973) is an American medical doctor and writer. First a published poet and a high school teacher, she later took up medical studies, and became an assistant professor of psychiatry and human behavior at Brown University's Alpert Medical School. She is the recipient of a 2015 Guggenheim Fellowship.

== Personal life and early career ==
Montross was born to Scott and Janice Montross. She is a sister of former NBA basketball player and sports commentator Eric Montross.

Montross grew up in Indianapolis before moving to Ann Arbor, Michigan to attend the University of Michigan. There, she received her Bachelors of Science in French literature and Bachelors of Arts in environmental science in 1996.She went on to receive a Master of Arts in poetry from the same university in 1998. She had her works published in various literary journals including Calyx, Witness, and Alligator Juniper. While a graduate student, she also met her wife, Deborah Salem Smith; the two moved to San Francisco together. Montross' experiences there as a teacher at a charter school for at-risk students led to her interest in psychiatry; after a year doing pre-medical coursework at Bryn Mawr College, she entered the Brown University School of Medicine in September 2001. While a medical student, she also pursued independent study under Carole Maso of Brown's literary arts program. She received her MD degree in 2006 and her Master of Medical Science degree in 2007, and completed her residency in 2010. She went on to be appointed to her current position of assistant professor of psychiatry and human behavior. As a practicing inpatient psychiatrist, Montross performs forensic psychiatric examinations.

== Books ==
=== Body of Work ===
Montross' first book, Body of Work: Meditations on Mortality from the Human Anatomy Lab, is a memoir of her time as a medical student. She wrote it during her first year at Brown. A major theme of Body of Work is the reactions of Montross and her student colleagues to their first dissection of a human corpse, which they nickname "Eve". More broadly, Montross also discusses the history of anatomy, including her visit to Padua to see the laboratory where Andreas Vesalius performed the dissections which led to his influential work on human anatomy, De humani corporis fabrica. Montross appeared on C-SPAN's Q&A for an interview with Brian Lamb about the book. Rachel Hartigan Shea of The Washington Post praised Body of Work as "a beautiful book" which "offers of a place off limits to anyone without Montross's clearsighted courage", while Katie Roiphe of The New York Times Book Review named it an Editor's Choice.

=== Falling Into the Fire ===
Montross received the MacColl Johnson Fellowship in 2010, using the award money to conduct research in Paris on the origins of psychiatric treatment and to begin work on a collection of poetry, tentatively titled Lunacy and Light. That project evolved into Falling Into the Fire: A Psychiatrist's Encounters with the Mind in Crisis, a nonfiction work that discusses mental disorders in a series of case studies. The profiles are interspersed with anecdotes from Montross's domestic life.

=== Waiting for an Echo: The Madness of American Incarceration ===
Montross used her 2015 Guggenheim Fellowship grant award to work on a third book about mentally ill people in United States jails and prisons, titled Waiting for an Echo: The Madness of American Incarceration. In the course of her research, she studied correctional institutions in the United States and abroad, including the Cook County Jail in Chicago and Halden Prison in Norway.
