= Sarah Pinder =

Canadian poet

Sarah Pinder is a Canadian poet.

Her debut poetry collection, Cutting Room, was published in 2012, and she followed up with Common Place in 2017. Common Place received a Lambda Literary Award nomination for Lesbian Poetry at the 30th Lambda Literary Awards in 2018.

== Works ==
- Cutting Room (2012)
- Common Place (2017)
