= We Were Witches =

2017 novel by Ariel Gore

- Author: Ariel Gore
- Language: English
- Genre: Feminist literature Contemporary literature
- Publisher: The Feminist Press
- Publication date: September 5, 2017
- Publication place: United States
- ISBN: 978-1-558-61433-8

We Were Witches is a 2017 novel by Ariel Gore. It is a first-person narrative of a fictionalized version of the author, of her life as a teen mom and budding feminist, from the birth of her daughter when she was 18 years old, to her graduation from Mills College.

== Background ==
The main character is named Ariel Gore—the author's own name, and her story closely follows a period of several years in the author's real life, covered in her earlier memoirs, Atlas of the Human Heart and End of Eve. The story begins when Gore gives birth to her daughter at the age of 18, in rural Italy, and is subjected to obstetric violence, and closes after her graduation from Mills College. However, the author said that We Were Witches is a novel and not a memoir.

== Reception ==
Kirkus Reviews calls the book "Inventive and affecting", and "a welcome addition to Gore's oeuvre". The review characterizes Gore's choice to present a protagonist with her own name and similar biography as a novel as "provocative", concluding that this provides cover for the more fantastical elements of the book (such as characters turning into animals and providing Gore with guidance); and that the author's insistence that she herself is not the protagonist Ariel Gore "makes perfect sense in a book about the construction of an identity. In choosing novel over memoir, Gore is asserting that she is giving us her art, not her self."

In her Lambda Literary review, Daphne Sidor notes both the conflict between patriarchal oppression and feminine self-determination, highlighting this passage from the book: "The voices of the men on the AM radio ranted fast about welfare queens and unfit mothers and all the ways our children would suffer, and the scarlet letter of my bad decisions seared itself into my skin like a brand, reminding me to feel dirty and afraid even when I’d woken up content, my breasts swelling with sustenance," while also acknowledging that Gore successfully addresses the internal conflicts and dualities faced by her protagonist. She enthuses: "As much as We Were Witches wanders from the traditional novel form, it’s never just an assemblage of things that happened. Gore tells her story with such verve and wit I missed my train stop reading it. Then I rode and read a little further, pausing to glance up at the station names and at the several young mothers who shared my car, in love with their babies, immersed in their thoughts."

In CraftLiterary, Melissa Benton Barker calls the We Were Witches a "feminist novel and anti-shame manifesto, [that] offers a blueprint of writing craft as both a radical disruption of the patriarchy and a powerful healing tool for those who live outside the patriarchy’s prescribed norms," noting that it is written outside the traditional narrative arc of Freytag’s pyramid, and is classified as a novel "because it straddles the narrowing space between memoir and fiction". She concludes by addressing the magic in the novel: "If magic is one of the ways that the historically marginalized have found voice and power, then here is narrative at its most primal: communicating the story of the self, an intimate communication binding the reader and the writer—the craft of writing as a magical, alchemical tool".

== Awards ==
2018 nominee for the Lambda Literary Award for Lesbian Fiction.
