= Get Loweded =

Seattle variety show

Get Loweded is a variety show, sketch comedy, cabaret, life experience, multi-media art presentation and, according to Seattle's alternative press, "alcohol soaked freakshow." The show takes place at a Seattle, Washington venue called Re-bar. Through random hookups with strangers, culinary challenges, burlesque, live music, surreal story arcs(they spent 9 months set in the post-apocalyptic future), free drinks and interactive humor, they focus on presenting a unique take on the standard variety show format. Get Loweded focuses on celebrating nightlife and lifestyle

Get Loweded was created by Seattle media producer Chas Roberts after a conversation about a Minneapolis-based lifestyle talk show called Drinking with Ian. Following the lead of that show he set out to create a more rowdy version with other influences ranging from the Upright Citizen's Brigade, the State, 3rd wall deconstructing series the Larry Sanders Show with a nod to surreal professional wrestling story arcs and game shows.

Get Loweded has a cast of somewhat notable Seattle based performers with a variety of skills including: Jackson Lowe (Chas Roberts' alter ego, emcee), Emmett Montgomery (comedian, writer, co-host), Danielle Radford (comedian, writer, host of the Are you Smarterer ... segment), Evilyn Sin Claire (burlesque performer, writer), Brandi Bratrude (journalist, acts as prize girl), Jack Portwood (video/production specialist, musician), Josh Black/Ronald McFondle (performance artist, writer). For each run (September–June), the performers don various personas as fitting.

== Original run (August 2007-August 2008) ==
Get Loweded's opening season began on August 18, 2007. The basic format included what became the Get Loweded staples: interactive games "Are you Smarterer than ... :"featuring notable local performers versus random audience members in a slightly rigged intellectual challenge and "Would you Eat That:" a culinary challenge based on foods people had told Chas Roberts they had actually eaten after a late night. Also, it featured the Hook Up Challenge where random audience members were selected to sit in a cushy area, given free drinks and provided private entertainment over the course of the show. At the show's end, they would decide to hookup(kiss in front of the audience) or split up. Generally the shows were paced to get progressively louder and rowdier to emulate a "stations of the cross for drunks."

The show would begin with a band playing a 30-minute set. An opening video would then play introducing the show. Jackson Lowe would then come out and present a monologue, during which he announces the rules of the drinking game(first rule anytime someone curses, the crowd drinks. Second rule, anytime someone wins a prize, they make a new rule) After the monolog, he would choose the Hook Up contestants. The bartender would then be introduced who would explain how to make the drink special and Jackson would buy everyone in attendance a drink. A local performer would then be introduced, usually a novelty act like a juggler, or hula hooper. Then "Are you Smarterer ...", followed by an intermission.

Post intermission would begin with a prize, then usually 3 more acts. The two final segments were usually "the Intergender Arm Wrestling Champion," which featured a Kauffman-esque performer named Matthew Brennan, IV who would inspire ire with the female fans, then challenge one to an arm wrestling competition, usually cheating to win and "Would you Eat that?"

The show ended with a curtain call and all that night's performers singing a verse of "You are my Sunshine" to the audience.

A significant plot at this time featured the prize girl, Brandi Bratrude, getting pregnant. Over the course of nine months, her belly grew in size while she continued to drink and smoke. At the end of nine months, she gave birth to a 250-pound "monster baby." She documented the experience, including reactions from those not "in-the-know" on a blog.

Each show also had an individual theme some of which included: Get Loweded Salutes the Bar Industry(industry types were admitted free), ... Salutes the Vagina (all female line up, ladies received a discount), and Get Loweded Sells Out.

== Season 2 (September 2008-May 2009) Get Apocalyptic ==
Season two featured the cast in a dystopian future as a traveling show moving from survival community to survival community. The core elements of the show remained with subtle theme changes. Drinks, prizes, videos, music, comedy and hookups became moving picture, funnies, treasures from the past, drinkers, sound playing, and making handsies with strangers. The Intergender Arm Wrestling Champion was now a single man looking for the strongest of the species with which to procreate. The set was grander, with the inside of Re-bar being made to resemble an "old timey" revival tent.

Jackson Lowe now was a gun toting minister known as the "Man with the Golden Mic." The rest of the cast had various new guises: "the Son of Hope" Emmett Montgomery "the Creator of Champions" Matthew Brennan, IV "the Tale Teller" Jack Portwood "the Mistress of Treasures" Brandi Bratrude "the Collector of History" Danielle Radford "the Erotic Temptress" Evilyn Sin Claire

The greater theater influence continued with the addition of villains to the show: roaming mutants and the King of Texas, Lyndon Herbert Walker Ewing III, played by Rat City Rollergirls announcer and BlöödHag frontman Jake Stratton who became Alex Jones' most-beloved and cuddly pet goblin in August 2017 after throwing hot coffee on the Texas talk show host during a Seattle street scuffle.

One description of a show, from the event's blog:

As events last, the need to change and grow becomes more apparent. Get Loweded feels that need.

We are proud to announce the new phase in the Northwest's best live experience:

Get Loweded GETS APOCALYPTIC!!!

Becoming the world's first post apocalyptic drinking game/variety show is no small task. Nearly all aspects of the show have been reinvented with the core ideals of drinks, prizes, videos, music, comedy and hookups remaining.

The premise: The world was a beautiful place once. Vibrant, life sustaining, plants animals and people thrived. There were flowers, trees, pandas, puppies, people and fish. Now there's just a few people. The end of the world wasn't the end of the planet, more the end of culture and civilization. What was it that caused the end? The abuse of fuels, economic crisis, the super power race, the battle for the arctic, religion, the extinction of a key species? The answer to all, a resounding "yes." But what remained? A few pockets banded together to form tightly knit communities struggling for survival. Against famine, rival communities and mutants they fight. Art, medicine and culture was seemingly lost forever. Until they came. They brought the nectar of the gods and a celebration of it. They preached hope, survival and the ability to rejoice once more. Who were they? They are a traveling team of performers, leaders, shamen of hope.

They bring the nectar of the gods ... a potent brew that will make the audience forget their woes of the poisoned lands that no longer bears fruit, the dried waters that once flowed from the peak tops to the oceanics. Get Loweded carries words from faraways. They sling distractions from Charlie Death and his flaps of peril.

It's moving picture, funnies, treasures from the past, drinkems, sound playing, and making handsies with strangers.

Get Loweded returns to the Emerald City meet place known as Re-bar. We make our presence

the third Monday of every month.

The final episode of this run included a gunfight between the King of Texas' Army and the cast of Get Loweded with everyone except for an adopted orphan dying.

== Season 3 (September 2009-June 2010) Get Loweded in the Golden Age of Television ==
For the beginning of their third run, Get Loweded is tackling the Golden Age of Television. They now are set between 1957 and 1963 supposedly airing on the DuMont Network. They are staging a "late night television show" which was unwatched at the time, but later became a favorite of a video store clerk. They produced a "mockumentary" about this show to explain the premise.

The performers don guises appropriate to this era: Jackson Lowe is a former mid level crooner and entertainer. Emmett Montgomery, Mr. Hopeful, was Jackson Lowe's partner while travelling the Borscht Belt who was later blacklisted under McCarthyism. Danielle Radford became Daniella Marie, a black entertainer who met Jackson and Emmett while working the Chitlin Circuit. She adopted the guise of a woman of Italian descent to better be able to work in television. Evilyn Sin Claire became a former showgirl whose outspoken women's lib views resulted in a lack of opportunities and arrests. Ronald McFondle became Ronny Fondlestein, a disgraced former children's show host who through a loophole in his contract was allowed to give away one more prize. He rigs his game, "the Rub" so that no one can ever win and he continues to be employed. Jack Portwood was a former big band leader and jingle writer (his character is credited with penning the Chock full o'Nuts "That Heavenly Feeling" jingle) who, after reading the writings of Jack Kerouac left behind the big band for a more "portable" method: the acoustic guitar. Prize girl Brandi Bratrude became a disgraced former beauty queen and magician's assistant who, after allegedly becoming pregnant with the child of a studio exec was banished to the late night for the extent of her contract.

The antagonists for this run are the network head, Chas Roberts, who uses Get Loweded as an embezzlement front and Joey Jacobs the much better known host of an earlier program who steals Get Loweded's ideas and footage. Joey Jacobs often appears in the audience with a notebook and pen taking notes and occasionally upstages Jackson Lowe, who is the only cast member aware of his antics.

== Closing the show ==
Preceding the start of their February 5, 2010 show, Get Loweded producer Chas Roberts announced that the current run would be the final season of Get Loweded. The last show is scheduled for June 4, 2010. This was verified on their Facebook fan page with this announcement:

I've spent all month trying to figure out the best way to say this. I've spent all month looking for some poetic epic statement to round out the feeling I, we, have. I realized after much deliberation that the best way to do it is post-show, wicked drunk. That just seems appropriate. No spell check, no paranoia, just with a love of the show.

Yes. Sounds good.

With that love, comes a heavy heart. A heavy heart because the time is now to conclude a three year endeavor into an experiment that yielded amazing creative results. They were results that were the culmination of all the ideas that made the show what it became including garnering attention for deserved talent, building a strong, devoted fan base, creating a new take on time tested concepts and building an ideal resume addition for the performers, producers, cast and crew involved.

We created acts that sucked up all expendable and non-expendable funds available for one show. We played with the dynamics of our individual and collective roles. We sucked up and teamed up to create, what began as one performer's selfish showcase, a show that none of us had ever seen or been a part of before.

There were comparisons: Pho Bang, SSP, Dina Martina ... all Re-bar originals. At the end of the day, We became something new, exciting, and dynamic which was where those comparisons came from.

All that being said, it's time to call it a day. After the aforementioned three years, Get Loweded will be concluding its three year run on June 4, 2010.

We will be concluding the current "Golden Age" Run on May 7, 2010(this ending will be amazing. TRUST ME) Our June 4 show will be a "best of the old school" show that will involve Inter-gender Arm Wrestling, a pregnant prize gal and all the golden oldies from this three year run.
