= An Excess Male =

2017 dystopian novel by Maggie Shen King

- First edition
- Author: Maggie Shen King
- Language: English
- Genre: dystopian thriller science-fiction
- Publisher: Harper Voyager
- Publication date: 2017
- Publication place: United States
- ISBN: 9780062662552 (paperback)

An Excess Male is a 2017 Chinese-American dystopian fiction novel by Maggie Shen King, which follows the four-person perspective of members of a polyandrous blended family in an authoritarian communist future China. The book was listed as one of the "best science fiction and fantasy books to read in September" by The Washington Post, and received mixed to positive critical reviews, with critics noting the exploration of a staunch communist ideology in juxtaposition with individual liberty in the areas of LGBT rights, women's rights and rights for mentally disabled people.

== Plot ==
An Excess Male is set in a near-future China ruled under authoritarian communism. There is an ongoing war between the People's Liberation Party and the Chinese Communist Party, and due to China's earlier One-Child Policy, female citizens are scarce and in high demand. They are often matched or auctioned off for a dowry, and polyamory has been sanctioned by the State. Wei-guo, a 44-year-old Chinese man who runs a training centre, is aided by his two fathers in the pursuit of a suitable female partner. They meet the enigmatic Wu Family for dinner, a peculiar group consisting of Hanh (a closeted gay man and the family patriarch), his brother Xiong-Xin (an obese man with autism who insists on being called "XX"), and May-Ling, the 22-year-old matriarch, who has an infant toddler named "BeiBei". Wei-guo immediately feels a connection with May-Ling, but he is frustrated when, after a planned date, May-Ling brings the disobedient, badly-behaved BeiBei with her, but he feigns support and May-Ling forms an even stronger liking to him. She harbours secrets of the two brothers who married her: Hanh is "Willfully Sterile" and will be reeducated and sterilized if discovered to be gay, as homosexuality and asexuality are viewed with disdain by the State; XX is a "Lost Boy" (neurodiverse) and will be branded mentally ill and institutionalized if this is discovered, despite his successful career and computer programming skills. May-Ling is unhappy in this relationship, finding scheduled sex with XX unpleasant and awkward, and disappointed that Hanh never wants to touch her. She also worries privately that BeiBei might have ADHD and that the child might be sterilized as part of the State's eugenics standards. May-Ling grew up from infancy to be married off for a dowry to the benefit of her parents, who were both gambling addicts, something that she recalls painfully after playing a romantic virtual reality game with XX. Hanh has a tenuous relationship with professional marriage broker Hero, a paunchy, overtly effeminate man who, knowing Hahn's secret sexuality, pushes Wei-guo to marry into the Wu Family.

Wei-guo investigates the family at the behest of his fathers, who suspect that Hanh is gay and that XX has autism. He meets Hanh's private sexual partners, a group of men who use badminton as a front for hooking up, and he befriends them and shows respect, questioning the State's prejudices towards gays. He is bothered by a repulsive male prostitute and local hustler named Jimmy. XX, who dreams of a simple life with the stray dogs he has adopted in the city, longs for a divorce and comes to regard Wei-guo as a true companion, hoping that he will marry May-Ling. Wei-guo invites him to a war game, a situation that ends up going very oddly when XX is mistaken for a wealthy Party official, but the train they're on is held up by teenage soldiers who insist that Wei-guo nominate a selection of innocent men in his troop for psychological evaluations (which will lead to forced institutionalization). This is the result of an earlier incident in which a group of perverted soldiers sexually harassed a 14-year-old girl and her brother beat them to death; it is hoped that psychological evaluations will weed out the chance of any further incidents. XX is able to rewire the train doors so that he and Wei-guo can escape. Wei-guo is invited to the Wu Family's house for a "Compatibility Night". May-Ling, meanwhile, discovers that Hanh has been awarded a coveted housing flat with numerous rooms, but that he neglected to tell her about it. Wei-guo visits the family to find them in chaos, with May-Ling crying and BeiBei refusing to clean up his toys. He and May-Ling have passionate sex that night when May-Ling wears a pretty emerald-green dress, but the next day, Wei-guo is met with disapproval from his fathers, who think he is marrying into a dysfunctional family. When XX applies for a divorce, he accidentally attracts State attention to his family. Hanh is harassed by Jimmy, who blackmails him with graphic sexual photos. Comrade Tang, a Party official, arrests Hanh and sends him to a "Sexual Change" facility, monitoring his conversations with implanted digital technology. He is forbidden to see BeiBei, is beaten badly in his abdominal area, and has to share a communal bathroom. Wei-guo witnesses the systematic killing of 200 soldiers as a response to his failure to nominate any of them for psychological evaluations, and he is branded the killer by the State. XX establishes sanctuary for him, and leaves his favourite dog, a butterscotch-coloured mutt named "MaMa Dog", to protect him. XX and May-Ling try to blackmail the State for Hanh's freedom, but even when he is set free, their family is still broken and Hanh is traumatized. The family members wonder if a day will come where they no longer have to hide who they are, leaving the future ambiguous.

== Publication ==
According to Maggie Shen King, being interviewed by Cheryl Wassenaar of Fansided, An Excess Male went through multiple different draft titles, including "One Wife Policy, No Country for Patriots, The Courtship of a Surplus Male, and a lot more". King stated, "we weren’t certain An Excess Male was the right one when we submitted the book, but I loved the unexpected and provocative use of the word ‘excess’ and the questions it raised". King also wrote an accompanying short story about "heihaizi or "shadow" or "ghost children", [who] are undocumented, illegal, and non-existent in the eyes of the law. They have no rights to health care, education, or legal protection. They cannot ride public transportation, marry, obtain or inherit property, or have children. The 2010 Census estimated the number of ‘nonpersons’ to be at least 13 million." She posted the short story, which was titled An Excess Male Companion Story, on her own personal website.

== Reception ==
An Excess Male received mixed to positive reviews from critics. Kirkus Reviews said, "told in alternating viewpoints, King's novel takes its cues from classic sci-fi dystopias, from The Handmaid’s Tale to Ender’s Game, to demonstrate the repressive control mechanisms already at work in everyday life. An intelligent, incisive commentary on how love survives - or doesn’t - under the heel of the State." Rachel Swirsky of Locus Magazine criticized the "contested" demographic data that Maggie Shen King claimed to have based her novel's concept on, comparing the idea of population issues to Soylent Green, but she praised the book's execution in general, stating, "I was impressed by this book’s unusual engagement with complex political issues, its complex characters, and its largely elegant plot development. In An Excess Male, King has challenged herself with particularly difficult writing gymnastics. I’m not the right person to say whether she lands it perfectly, but it’s a beautifully executed aerial."

Shannon Liao, a journalist for The Verge, noted that An Excess Male explores important real-life issues in communist countries, stating, "like ex-communist and communist countries Russia and Cuba, China currently has its fair share of homophobic policies, including censoring all queer content online. In King’s future China, queer folks have been designated as “Willfully Sterile,” which sounds relatively progressive until it's revealed that the designation means queer people are deemed unfit to be parents." Literary magazine The Quill to Live agreed, saying, "King uses numerous lenses including lifestyles, sexual orientations, and even cultural views of developmental disorders to demonstrate that regardless of gender, nobody benefits from such a societal structure."

== See also ==
- The Handmaid's Tale
- We The Living
- Soylent Green
