= Brian Bouldrey =

United States writer, editor, and professor

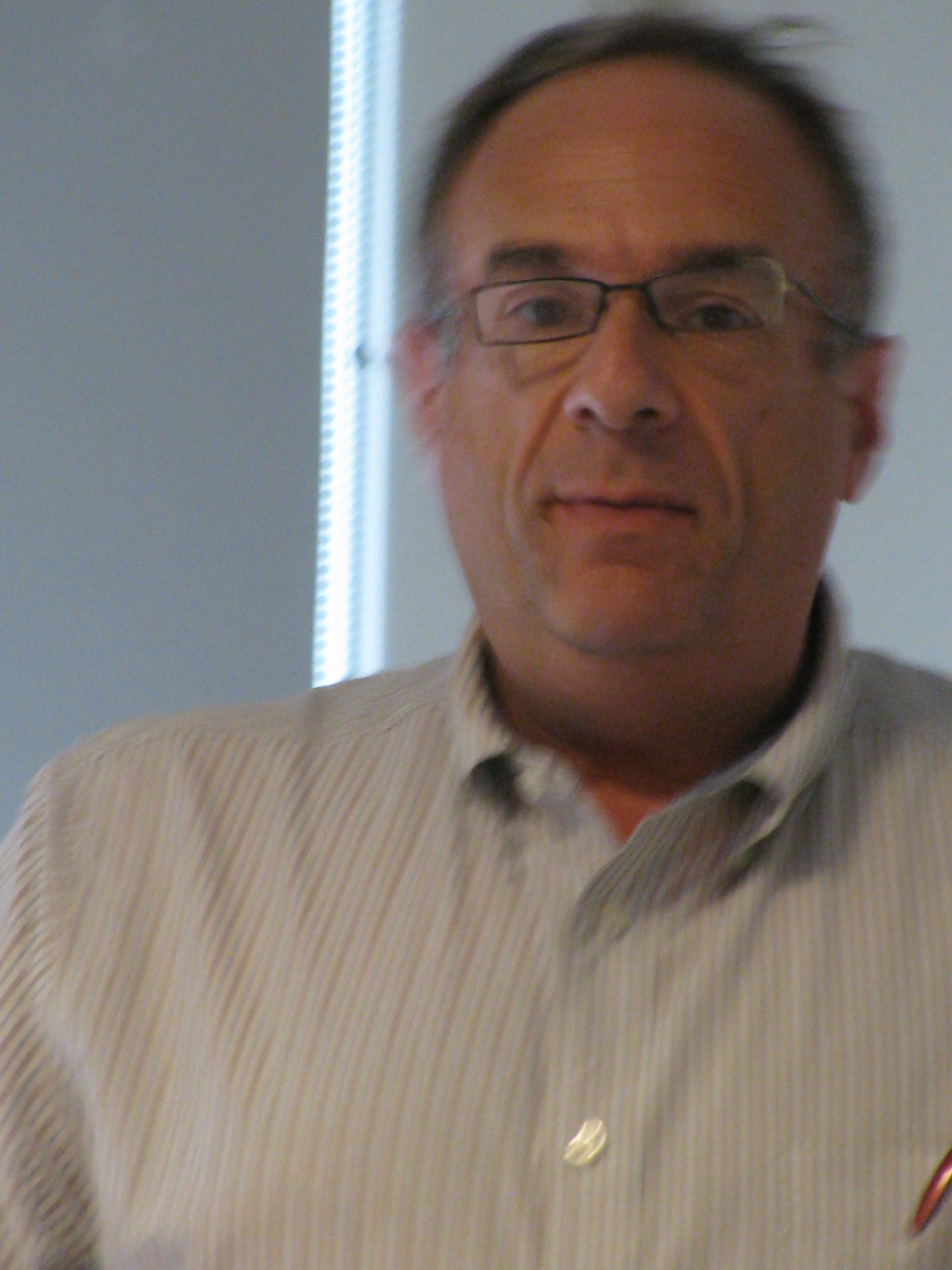
- Occupation: Professor
- Writing career
- Genres: Fiction; Editor

Brian Bouldrey is an American writer and actor.

== Life ==
He is a Senior Lecturer in Northwestern University's English Department. At Northwestern, he founded the Creative Non-Fiction writing sequence, which he currently teaches. He is also a Visiting Writer at Lesley University.

== Bibliography ==
=== Fiction ===
- The Genius of Desire, 1995
- Love, the Magician, 2000
- The Boom Economy: Or, Scenes from Clerical Life, 2003

=== Nonfiction ===
- The Autobiography Box, 1999
- Monster: Gay Adventures in American Machismo, 2001
- Honorable Bandit: A Walk Across Corsica, (2007, Terrace Books)

=== Anthologies edited ===
- Best American Gay Fiction, 1993
- Wrestling with the Angel: Faith and Religion in the Lives of Gay Men, 1995
- Best American Gay Fiction, 1996
- Best American Gay Fiction, 1998
- Traveling Souls: Contemporary Pilgrimage Stories, 1999
- Writing Home: Award-Winning Literature from the New West, 1999

== Awards ==
- Lambda Literary Award, 1996
- Joseph Henry Jackson Award, 1998
