= Metrolina Theatre Association =

The Metrolina Theatre Association (MTA) is a non-profit organization based in Charlotte, North Carolina, US, established in 1985 to strengthen arts awareness and to be an advocate of the performing arts in the Charlotte-Mecklenburg region.

MTA represents more than 70 organizations and hundreds of theatrical artists, directors and producers in the Charlotte region.

Each year MTA presents the Metrolina Theatre Awards in eight categories including drama, comedy and musical theatre.

MTA is funded in part by the National Endowment for the Arts, the North Carolina Arts Council and the Arts & Science Council. MTA is a 501(c)(3) tax-exempt organization.
