= Ariel Gore =

American writer

- Born: June 25, 1970 (age 56); Carmel, California, U.S.
- Education: Mills College; University of California, Berkeley
- Occupations: Journalist, Author
- Family: John Duryea (stepfather)
- Awards: Lambda Award

Ariel Gore (born June 25, 1970) is an American editor, author, and teacher. Gore has authored more than 13 books including novels and experimental memoirs, and is a Lambda Award-winner. Gore's fiction and nonfiction work also explores creativity, spirituality, queer culture, and positive psychology. She is the founding editor/publisher of Hip Mama, an Alternative Press Award-winning publication covering the culture and politics of motherhood. Through her work on Hip Mama, Gore is widely credited with launching maternal feminism and the contemporary mothers' movement.

Her anthology Portland Queer: Tales of the Rose City won the best "LGBT anthology" at the 22nd annual Lambda Literary Award in 2010.

== Early life and education ==
Ariel Gore was born June 25, 1970, in Carmel, California. Her mother, Eve de Bona, was the subject of her book The End of Eve (2014). Her stepfather, John Duryea, was a priest who had been excommunicated in 1976 by the Catholic Church when he confessed in a sermon that he had fallen in love with Gore's mother. Gore was raised in Palo Alto, California and attended Addison Elementary School, Jordan Middle School (renamed to Greene Middle School) and two years at Palo Alto High School. She left high school at age 15 by taking the California High School Proficiency Test. In her book Atlas of the Human Heart (2003), Gore recounts the period in her life just after leaving high school, when she traveled the world, working odd jobs and squatting in abandoned buildings.

She is a graduate of Mills College and the University of California at Berkeley Graduate School of Journalism. While attending Mills College in the 1990s, Gore was a young, single mom raising her daughter.

== Work ==
=== Hip Mama ===
The first issue of Hip Mama was published in December, 1993, in Oakland, California as part of Gore's senior project while attending Mills College. Published quarterly, the magazine relocated to Portland, Oregon in the 1990s. It was created as a forum for single, urban, and feminist mothers. Each issue had a broad theme which the content would explore via various types of writing and graphics.

In 2014, Gore moved back to Oakland and relaunched Hip Mama with expanded food, arts, and political coverage. "It's the quality of the writing that sets Hip Mama apart," noted The New Yorker.

=== Atlas of the Human Heart (1998) ===
Her memoir, Atlas of the Human Heart, recounts Gore's teenage years and her travels. This book was a 2004 finalist for the Oregon Book Award's Sarah Winnemucca Award for Creative Nonfiction.

== Teaching ==
She has taught as a faculty fellow at The Attic Institute of Arts and Letters in Portland, Oregon, University of New Mexico in Albuquerque, and at the Institute of American Indian Arts (IAIA) in Santa Fe. She currently teaches at Ariel Gore's School for Wayward Writers (or The Literary Kitchen).

== Personal life ==
Gore is openly queer and has two children, a daughter and a son. After living in Portland, Oregon for many years, Gore and her family moved to Oakland, California in approximately 2014 and lived there for 3 years before moving to New Mexico. The family moved back to Oakland in 2024.

Gore's daughter, Maia Swift, is an artist and art director. She previously worked as an art director for her mother's Hip Mama magazine and helped her co-author, Whatever, Mom: Hip Mama's Guide to Raising a Teenager (2004).

Gore was married to chef Deena Chafetz from 2013, until Chafetz's death from metastatic breast cancer in 2023.

== Bibliography ==
=== Nonfiction ===
- Gore, Ariel (1998). The Hip Mama Survival Guide: Advice from the Trenches. Hyperion. ISBN 0-7868-8232-8
- Gore, Ariel (2000). The Mother Trip. Seal Press. ISBN 1-58005-029-8
- Gore, Ariel (2003). Atlas of the Human Heart. Seal Press. ISBN 1-58005-088-3
- Gore, Ariel with Swift, Maia (2004). Whatever, Mom: Hip Mama's Guide to Raising a Teenager. Seal Press. ISBN 1-58005-089-1
- Gore, Ariel (2007). How to Become a Famous Writer Before You're Dead: Your Words in Print and Your Name in Lights. Three Rivers Press. ISBN 0-307-34648-X
- Gore, Ariel (2010). Bluebird: Women and the New Psychology of Happiness. Farrar, Straus and Giroux. ISBN 0-374-11489-7
- Gore, Ariel (2014). The End of Eve. Portland, Oregon: Hawthorne Books. ISBN 978-0986000799.
- Gore, Ariel (2019). Hexing the Patriarchy: 26 Potions, Spells, and Magical Elixirs to Embolden the Resistance. Seal Press. ISBN 978-1580058742
- Gore, Ariel (2020). F*ck Happiness. Microcosm Publishing. ISBN 978-1621069508
- Gore, Ariel (2022). The Wayward Writer: Summon Your Power to Take Back Your Story, Liberate Yourself from Capitalism, and Publish Like a Superstar. Microcosm Publishing. ISBN 978-1648411847
- Gore, Ariel (2025). Rehearsals for Dying: Digressions on Love and Cancer. Feminist Press. ISBN 978-1558613362

=== Novels ===
- Gore, Ariel (2006). The Traveling Death and Resurrection Show. HarperSanFrancisco. ISBN 0-06-085428-6
- Gore, Ariel (2017). We Were Witches. The Feminist Press. ISBN 1558614338

=== Anthologies ===
- Gore, Ariel (2004). The Essential Hip Mama: Writing from the Cutting Edge of Parenting. Seal Press. ISBN 1-58005-123-5
- Gore, Ariel, with Lavender, Bee (2001). Breeder: Real-Life Stories from the New Generation of Mothers. Seal Press ISBN 1-58005-051-4
- Gore, Ariel (2009). Portland Queer: Tales of the Rose City. Lit Star Press/Microcosm Publishing ISBN 1-934620-65-3
