= The Gulf (play) =

Play by American playwright Audrey Cefaly

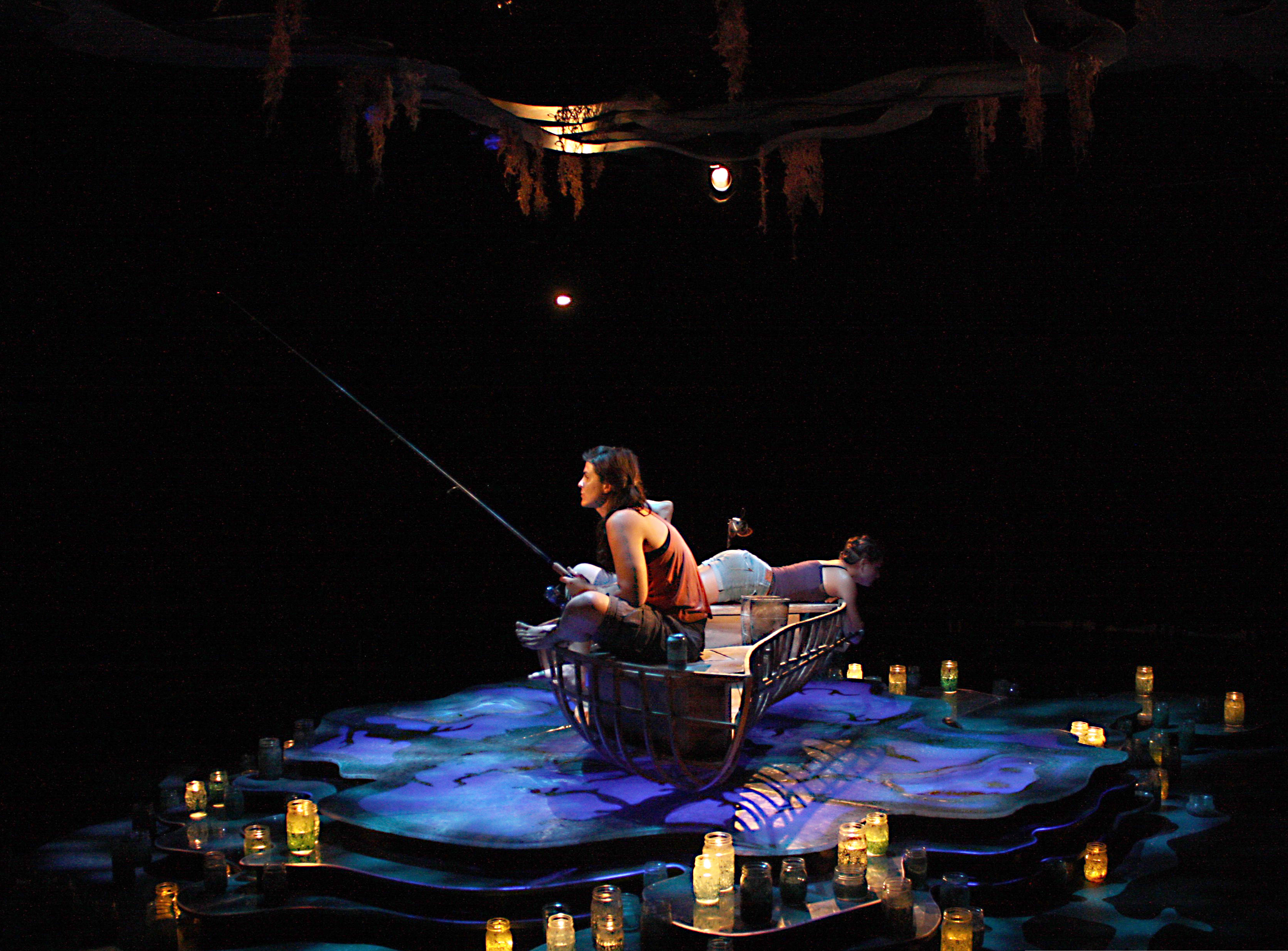
The Gulf by Audrey Cefaly at Signature Theatre (2016). Photo by Paige Hathaway.

The Gulf is a play by American playwright Audrey Cefaly. It is a recipient of the 2017 Lambda Literary Award for Drama and the 2016 Edgerton Foundation New American Play Award. The play was adapted from a one-act version, which won the 40th Annual Samuel French Off Off Broadway Short Play Festival in 2015. The play takes place on a fishing boat in the author's home state of Alabama.

== Production history ==
The Gulf had its world premiere at September 2016 at the Signature Theatre in Arlington, VA. The play had subsequent productions in Australia in August 2017 and in London in April 2018, where it featured Louisa Lytton and Anna Acton.

== Synopsis ==
The divide between Kendra and Betty mimics the very world that devours them: a vast and polarizing abyss. On a quiet summer evening, somewhere down in the Alabama Delta, Kendra and Betty troll the flats looking for red fish. After Betty begins diagnosing Kendra’s dead-end life with career picks from What Color is Your Parachute, their routine fishing excursion takes a violent turn.

== Characters ==
- Kendra: A loner. Scrappy, dark, brutish and volatile.
- Betty: An optimist. A thinker. Restless and tender Hearted.

== Awards ==
- Winner: 2017 Lambda Literary Award for Drama
- Nominated: 2017 Charles MacArthur Award for Outstanding Original New Play or Musical (Helen Hayes)
- Recipient of the 2016 Edgerton Foundation New American Play Award
- Winner of the 2015 Samuel French Off Off Broadway Short Play Festival.

== Publications ==
- Full-Length (Samuel French)
- One-Act:
  - Off Off Broadway Festival Plays, 40th Series (Samuel French)
  - Love is a Blue Tick Hound (Samuel French)
  - Best American Short Plays 2014-2015 (Hal Leonard Corporation)
