= Deborah Salem Smith =

American poet and playwright

Deborah Salem Smith is an American poet and playwright. She is the playwright-in-residence at Trinity Repertory Company in Providence, Rhode Island and is a Huntington Theatre Playwriting Fellow.

== Biography ==
Smith was born in Winston-Salem, North Carolina and grew up in Charlotte. She graduated cum laude from Princeton University with a degree in Art and Archaeology, where she wrote an additional thesis in poetry for the Creative Writing Program. She intended to become a poet or painter. During her undergraduate studies, Smith took a class with renowned South African playwright Athol Fugard, who encouraged her to merge her interests and become a playwright.

After completing her undergraduate studies, Smith ultimately decided to receive her MFA in poetry at the University of Michigan. Her thesis adviser in Michigan echoed the words of Fugard, noting Smith's theatrical use of dialogue and strong visual instincts in her poetry.

She published poems, including "Material Origins of Ethics" and "A Preface: The Diminishment of Infinity" in the Berkley Poetry Review, under the name D. Salem Smith.

In 2002, Smith's long poems evolved into her first play. She was awarded the 2004-2005 Fulbright Emerging American Artist (Playwriting) Fellowship in Dublin, Ireland, where she worked in the Abbey Theatre, and the 2004-2005 Rhode Island School of Design Humanities Travel Award to Belfast.

After returning from Ireland in 2005, Smith was commissioned by Trinity Repertory Company to write her first play, Boots on the Ground. The play premiered in 2006 and was directed by Laura Kepley. That same year, Smith was commissioned by Trinity Rep to write Some Things Are Private. The play premiered in 2008 and was named a "Critics Pick" by The Boston Globe.

Smith's 2012 play, Love Alone, received an Edgerton Foundation New American Play Award and an Honorable Mention by the Jane Chambers Playwriting Award. In addition, Love Alone was an IRNE Award finalist for Best New Play of 2013. Love Alone was also an Indy Week (North Carolina) Best Play of 2014 selection; and a National Lambda Literary Award finalist in Drama, 2016. The play is currently produced in multiple theaters across the country.

Faithful Cheaters, a comedy, premiered at Trinity Repertory Company in April, 2017.

Anna K. (new play-in-progress) had a reading in the 2016 Breaking Ground Festival at the Huntington Theatre.

Since 2007, Smith has been the playwright-in-residence at Trinity Rep. She also teaches the playwriting curriculum for the Brown/Trinity Rep MFA Program.

== Personal life ==
Deborah Salem Smith is married to Dr. Christine Montross and together they have two children.

Her brother-in-law Eric Montross was an NBA basketball player and sports commentator.

== Full-length plays ==
- Boots on the Ground
- Some Things Are Private
- Love Alone
- Faithful Cheaters
- Anna K. (new play-in-progress)
- The Getaway Driver

== Reviews ==
Louise Kennedy of The Boston Globe says of Smith's Boots on the Ground:

"Boots on the Ground" is successful precisely because it avoids polemic, on either side. It aims to show us the human cost of war, and it succeeds. Then it wisely lets us reflect on whether the cost is worth it, rather than telling us what to feel.

Kennedy also writes of Some Things Are Private, saying:

"Luminous, intelligent, provocative, and deeply moving," adding that it is also "great fun - never preachy, often humorous, and suffused throughout with a mixture of emotional warmth and intellectual engagement that's only too rare in contemporary culture."

Dr. Pauline W. Chen of The New York Times says of Love Alone:

Few plays or movies capture the emotional and professional aftermath of a medical error...Love Alone [is a] lucid, deeply nuanced and fearless work.

The Providence Journal's Channing Gray writes of Smith and Love Alone:

Smith tells a balanced tale that tells both sides of the issue, and she does so with subtlety and well-crafted dialogue..."Love Alone" is...most ambitious and most cogent...showing real maturity.

Larry O’Brien of Broadway World says of Smith’s Faithful Cheaters:

This is a screwball comedy that would have made George S. Kaufman proud.

David Christner of The Newport Daily News says:

"Faithful Cheaters" is as frantic a farce as any Frenchman ever formulated, but underlying all the good humor and physical comedy is a touching story about love. The structure of Smith’s comedy follows a formula that is centuries old, only deviating from the form when the playwright momentarily puts the hijinks aside and allows the emotional side of her characters to be exposed. It is in these small moments where Smith’s gift for exploring the fragility of the human heart through her words truly shines and makes this production so extraordinary.

Bob Abelman of The Boston Globe writes:

“The Getaway Driver” is an intense, well-paced, 90-minute memory play where Katherine (Katherine Ann Power) and Clare, as our two narrators and through direct address, guide the audience through events drawn directly from their past.
