= Some Things You Need to Know Before the World Ends =

1981 American play

Some Things You Need to Know Before the World Ends (A Final Evening with the Illuminati) is a comedy play by Larry Larson and Levi Lee of the Atlanta, Georgia-based Southern Theater Conspiracy.

The play was first performed in 1981 at the Nexus Theatre in Atlanta, directed by Rebecca Wackler and performed by Larson and Lee.

It was performed at the Actor's Theatre of Louisville's 10th Humana Festival in 1986, with the original cast and directed by Jon Jory. and subsequently published by Dramatists Play Service. It has since become popular among regional theaters. It was staged in Chicago in 2002.

== Plot ==
The play follows an evening church service with the Reverend Eddie, a Protestant minister, and his assistant, Brother Lawrence, in a dilapidated church. The audience functions as Eddie's congregation. The script draws from conspiracy theories (including the titular Illuminati, as well as the assassination of John F. Kennedy and the Freemasons), vaudeville humor, and pop culture references, such as Paul Lynde and The Seventh Seal (whereby the Reverend Eddie plays a game of basketball against Death).
