= Like Water (novel) =

2017 novel by Rebecca Podos

- Author: Rebecca Podos
- Language: English
- Genre: Young adult novel
- Publisher: Balzer + Bray
- Publication date: October 17, 2017
- Publication place: United States
- Pages: 320
- Awards: Lambda Literary Award for Children's and Young Adult Literature
- ISBN: 9-780-0623-7337-3

Like Water is a young adult novel written by Rebecca Podos and published in 2017 by Balzer + Bray. The story, which was the recipient of a Lambda Literary Award, centers on Savannah Espinoza, a teenager from New Mexico who begins discovering more about her sexuality when she becomes enamored with a genderqueer teenager, called Leigh.

Podos' book was received positively by critics, who commended the author's handling of the characters' sexuality and gender identity as well as the authentic description of living in a small town of New Mexico.

== Plot ==
Savannah Espinoza lives in a small town in New Mexico where most young adults leave in search for better opportunities in other cities. Espinoza's plan was to try applying for a scholarship based on her swimming skills, but at her final year of school, her father learns he has Huntington's disease. Espinoza decides to stay and help with the family's restaurant, instead of pursuing a degree, and she begins going out with any boy that shows interest.

Eventually, Savannah meets Lucas and his sister, Leigh, whose family had just moved in to the city. She finds herself sexually attracted to Leigh. The two teenagers begin a relationship, which causes Savannah to question her sexual identity. Although the two love each other, the relationship is filled with challenges due to Leigh's "mischievous and daring" personality.

== Development ==
The setting of Like Water is based on the period when Rebecca Podos was studying for her undergrad at an art school in Santa Fe, New Mexico. When Podos began writing the book, she was already set on having main character that is bisexual and a queer romantic relationship.

== Reception ==
Like Water was described as a "poignant coming-of-age story" in a Bulletin of the Center for Children's Books review, and "[a] strong coming-of-age story, if at times just slightly predictable for sophisticated readers" by the School Library Journal. The Bulletin review also praised the way the struggles that the main characters goes through, both in respect to her romantic and personal life.

Elisa Gershowitz, writing for The Horn Book Magazine, thought Savannah and Leigh's love to be "satisfyingly complex", as well as Savannah's relationship to her parents. While both reviews found the mix of English and Spanish in the dialogues added authenticity and made it more natural, Gershowitz called the writing, at times, "uneven". Podos' writing was also praised in the way it "perfectly captures the comforting yet cloistering feeling of living in a rural town". Although The Booklist's reviewer found Savannah to be somewhat "amorphous", she also found the protagonist's self-discovery of her bisexuality refreshing for being simply a "matter-of-fact".

Kirkus Reviews appreciated Leigh's character, but wrote the narrative was weakened by "[Savannah]'s personality", which was "hard to pin down". The reviewer still praised how the characters' sexuality and gender were handled by Podos, as well as the "richly and authentically [description of] the culture of a small New Mexico town".

The book received a Lambda Literary Award in 2018, in the Children's and Young Adult category.
