= Laughing Wild =

Play by Christopher Durang

Laughing Wild is a 1987 play written by Christopher Durang.

The show is written for one actor and one actress. The woman's character is emotional and unstable, and talks about hitting someone in the supermarket who wouldn't get out of her way when she was trying to select some tuna. The man's character is giving a speech about positive thinking, but keeps spiraling into negativity. He, it turns out, is the man the woman hit in the supermarket. The show consists of two 30-minute monologues and a 30 minute second act, some of it monologue, some of it scenes between the two characters. The characters do not have official names.

The original off-Broadway production featured Durang and E. Katherine Kerr. The Los Angeles production starred Durang and Jean Smart, later replaced by Christine Ebersole and Grant Shaud. In 2005, Boston's Huntington Theatre revived the play with Durang (again) and Debra Monk.
