= Hida Viloria =

American activist (born 1968)

- Born: May 29, 1968 (age 58); New York City, U.S.
- Education: University of California, Berkeley
- Occupations: Writer; author; intersex genderqueer activist
- Known for: Born Both: An Intersex Life
- Website: https://hidaviloria.com/

Hida Viloria (born May 29, 1968) is an American writer, author, producer, and human rights activist.

== Early life and education ==
Viloria was born in Jamaica, Queens, New York, to recently immigrated Colombian and Venezuelan parents. Viloria's father, a physician, and mother, an ex-school teacher, chose to register and raise Viloria as female without subjecting them to genital surgeries, which were generally recommended at the time as corrective procedures for infants with disorders of sexual development.

Viloria graduated from the University of California, Berkeley in 1998 with an Interdisciplinary Studies degree in Gender and Sexuality.

Viloria uses the neopronouns "s/he" and "he/r," and has also referred to themself with the singular they.

== Career ==
Viloria is author of the memoir Born Both: An Intersex Life (Hatchette Book Group, March, 2017), and co-author, with biologic sciences scholar Maria Nieto, Ph.D., The Spectrum of Sex: The Science of Male, Female, and Intersex (Jessica Kingsley Publishers - Hatchette UK, February, 2020). Meghan Daum reviewed Born Both in The New York Times, saying: "Viloria does us the even greater service (it's more of a gift, really) of showing us what it means to live not just as both a man and a woman but also as a third gender that eventually emerges as the right one." Viloria's essays have been published in venues such as The Washington Post, The Daily Beast, Huffington Post, The Advocate, Ms., The New York Times, The American Journal of Bioethics, the Global Herald, CNN.com, and more.

Viloria is also among the first in the world to speak out in the mainstream media, as an openly intersex person, against discrimination such as the use of medically unnecessary surgeries on intersex children, most notably on ABC's 20/20, and The Oprah Winfrey Show. In 2013, Viloria was the first openly intersex person to speak at the United Nations, by invitation, at the event "Sport Comes Out Against Homophobia", along with fellow "out" pioneers, tennis legend Martina Navratilova, and NBA player Jason Collins.
