= Rebecca Podos =

American author of young adult fiction

- Education: Emerson College, College of Santa Fe
- Writing career
- Years active: 2012-now
- Genres: young adult fiction, adult fiction
- Notable work: Like Water
- Notable awards: Lambda Literary Award 2018
- Website: rebeccapodos.com

Rebecca Podos is an American author of young adult fiction and adult fiction, and a literary agent.

== Career ==
Podos is a literary agent at Neighborhood Literary.

Her debut young adult novel, The Mystery of Hollow Places, is a thriller about a 17-year-old teen whose father, a best-selling mystery author, goes missing. Deciding that her father has gone to track down her mother, who abandoned them when she was a baby, she follows the clues she believes her father left behind in order to find them both. It was published by Balzer + Bray in 2016. The Mystery of Hollow Places received starred reviews from Kirkus Reviews, Booklist, and Bulletin of the Center for Children's Books.

Podos' second novel, Like Water, is about a bisexual Mexican-American teen who becomes a performing mermaid in a theme park, where she meets and falls for a genderqueer teen. It was published by Balzer + Bray in 2017 and won a Lambda Literary Award in 2018.

== Bibliography ==
Young Adult novels

- The Mystery of Hollow Places (Balzer + Bray, 2016)
- Like Water (Balzer + Bray, 2017)
- The Wise and the Wicked (Balzer + Bray, 2019)
- From Dust, a Flame (Balzer + Bray, 2022)
- Furious (Page Street, 2024)
- Homegrown Magic (Del Rey, 2025)
- What If...Kitty Pryde Stole the Phoenix Force? (Random House Worlds, 2025)

Short fiction

- "The Fourth" in Glimmer Train Stories #84, edited by Susan Burmeister-Brown and Linda B. Swanson-Davies (Glimmer Train Press, 2012)

== Awards ==
2018

- Lambda Literary Award for LGBTQ Children's/Young Adult for Like Water
