= Lillian Schlissel =

American historian, professor and author (born 1930)

Lillian Schlissel (born 22 February 1930) is an American historian, professor and author.

== Life and career ==
Schlissel was born on 22 February 1930 in New York City. She was raised in New York City. She is currently a professor emerita of English and American studies at Brooklyn College of the City University of New York.

== Bibliography ==
Some of her books are:

- Women's Diaries of the Westward Journey
- Far from Home: Families of the Westward Journey
- Black Frontiers: A History Of African American Heroes In The Old West
- Western Women: Their Land, Their Lives
- Three Plays by Mae West (Editor)
