= Audrey Cefaly =

American playwright

Audrey Cefaly is an American playwright.

== Career highlights ==
Cefaly is the recipient of the 2023 National New Play Network's Goldman Prize (Alabaster), the 2017 Lambda Literary Award ("Lammy") in the category of LGBTQ Drama (The Gulf), the 2016 Edgerton Foundation New American Play Award (The Gulf), and the 2017 David Calicchio Emerging American Playwright Prize (Alabaster). In 2020 her play Alabaster was nominated for the Pulitzer by Florida Repertory Theatre. She is the founder of Into the Woods, an annual artist's retreat in coastal Delaware, and the author of the newsletter How to Playwright.

=== Alabaster ===
Cefaly's play Alabaster won the 2017 David Calicchio Emerging American Playwright Prize from Marin Theatre Company. In January 2020 the play embarked on a record-breaking 10-city National New Play Network Rolling World Premiere, the largest in NNPN history, and was subsequently nominated for the Pulitzer by Florida Repertory Theatre. A production in February 2025 opened at Carolina Actors Studio Theatre in Charlotte, North Carolina.

Alabaster is published by Concord Theatricals.

=== The Gulf ===
Cefaly's play The Gulf won the 40th Annual Samuel French OOB Festival. Its full length adaptation received its world premiere at Signature Theatre, Arlington, VA, in September 2016 (directed by Joe Calarco). In 2017, it was nominated for the Charles MacArthur Award for Outstanding Original New Play or Musical (Helen Hayes Awards) and in 2018, the play won the Lambda Literary Award in the category of LGBTQ Drama. The play is published by Concord Theatricals.

=== Love is a Blue Tick Hound (Large-Cast Play) ===
Cefaly's collection Love is a Blue Tick Hound is a collection of four one-acts (The Gulf, Fin & Euba, Clean and Stuck). It received its world premiere at Terrific New Theatre in Birmingham, AL, in of December 2016. The play is published by Concord Theatricals.

=== Tell Me Something Good (Large-Cast Play) ===
In 2020, Cefaly collaborated with UAB Birmingham on the world premiere of her large-cast play Tell Me Something Good. The play was further developed by The Theatre Lab School of the Dramatic Arts in 2022 The play is published by TRW Plays.

=== Maytag Virgin ===
In October 2015, Cefaly directed the world premiere of what would become her most popular play, Maytag Virgin, as part of the inaugural Women's Voices Theatre Festival. The play has received dozens of productions across the U.S. and is published by Concord Theatricals.

=== The Last Wide Open ===
In February 2019, Cefaly's musical play The Last Wide Open (music by Matthew M. Nielson) received its world premiere at Cincinnati Playhouse in the Park. In 2023, Cefaly collaborated with Adirondack Theatre Company on a Spanish language translation. In 2024, Cefaly will collaborate with American Blues Theater on a Polish translation. The play is published by TRW Plays.

== Plays ==
=== Full-Length ===
- Alabaster
- The Gulf
- Maytag Virgin
- The Last Wide Open
- Trouble (at the Vista View Mobile Home Estates)

=== Large Cast Plays / Collections ===
- Love is a Blue Tick Hound (a collection of one-acts, cast size up to 8)
- Tell Me Something Good (large cast play, cast size 8-24)

== Awards ==
- Winner: 2023 National New Play Network's Goldman Prize (Alabaster)
- Nomination: 2020 Pulitzer Prize (Alabaster)
- Winner: 2018 Lammy Award: Best LGBTQ Drama (Lambda Literary Foundation) (The Gulf)
- Winner: 2017 David Calicchio Emerging American Playwright Prize (Marin Theatre Company) (Alabaster)
- Nominee: 2017 Charles MacArthur Award for Outstanding Original New Play or Musical (Helen Hayes Awards) (The Gulf)
- Recipient: 2015 Edgerton New American Play Award (Theater Communications Group) (The Gulf)

== Publications ==
=== Full-Length ===
- Alabaster (Concord Theatricals / Samuel French)
- Maytag Virgin (Concord Theatricals / Samuel French)
- The Gulf (Concord Theatricals / Samuel French)
- The Last Wide Open (TRW Plays)

=== Large Cast Plays / Collections ===
- Love is a Blue Tick Hound (a collection of one-acts, cast size up to 8) (Concord Theatricals / Samuel French) includes: The Gulf, Fin & Euba, Clean, and Stuck
- Tell Me Something Good (large cast play, cast size 8-24) (TRW Plays)

=== Shorts and One-Acts ===
- Stage It and Stream It: Plays for Virtual Theater (Applause Books)
- Off Off Broadway Festival Plays, 40th Series (Concord Theatricals / Samuel French)
- Best American Short Plays 2014-2015 (Applause Books)
- Best American Short Plays 2004-2005 (Applause Books)
