= National Book Award for Poetry =

Annual literary award in the United States

- Awarded for: Outstanding poetry work by U.S. citizens.
- Location: New York City
- Rewards: $10,000 USD (winner) $1,000 USD (finalists)
- First award: 1967–1983, 1991
- Website: National Book Foundation

The National Book Award for Poetry is one of five annual National Book Awards, which are given by the National Book Foundation to recognize outstanding literary work by US citizens. They are awards "by writers to writers". The judging panel is made up of five "writers who are known to be doing great work in their genre or field".

The category for Poetry was established in 1950 and has been awarded annually apart from the period 1984 to 1990.

The Poetry award and many others were eliminated from the program when it was revamped in 1984. It was restored in 1991, for current-year publications, with a standard five finalists announced a few weeks prior to the main event.

The award recognizes one book written by a US citizen and published in the US from December 1 of the previous year to November 30 in the award year. The National Book Foundation accepts nominations from publishers until June 15, requires mailing nominated books to the panelists by August 1, and announces five finalists in October. The winner is announced on the day of the final ceremony in November. The award is $10,000 and a bronze sculpture; other finalists receive $1000, a medal, and a citation written by the panel.

There were 148 nominations for the 2010 award. This had risen to 299 submissions by 2024.

== Winners and nominees ==
† marks winners of the Pulitzer Prize for Poetry

* marks finalists of the Pulitzer Prize for Poetry

National Book Award for Poetry winners, finalists, and longlisted entries
Year	Author	Title(s)	Result
1950	William Carlos Williams	Paterson: Book Three and Selected Poems (two books)	Winner
1951	Wallace Stevens	The Auroras of Autumn	Winner
1952	Marianne Moore	Collected Poems †	Winner
1952	W. H. Auden	Nones	Finalist
1952	William Rose Benèt	The Spirit of the Scene	Finalist
1952	Richard Eberhart	Selected Poems	Finalist
1952	Horace Gregory	Selected Poems of Horace Gregory	Finalist
1952	Randall Jarrell	The Seven-League Crutches	Finalist
1952	Theodore Roethke	Praise to the End!	Finalist
1952	Muriel Rukeyser	Selected Poems	Finalist
1952	William Carlos Williams	Paterson: Book Four	Finalist
1952	William Carlos Williams	Collected Earlier Poems	Finalist
1953	Archibald MacLeish	Collected Poems, 1917–1952 †	Winner
1953	Stanley Burnshaw	Early and Late Testament	Finalist
1953	Thomas H. Ferril	New and Selected Poems	Finalist
1953	Robert Hillyer	The Suburb by the Sea	Finalist
1953	Ernest Kroll	Cape Horns and Other Poems	Finalist
1953	W. S. Merwin	A Mask For Janus	Finalist
1953	Byron H. Reece	A Song of Joy	Finalist
1953	Naomi Replansky	Ring Song	Finalist
1953	Kenneth Rexroth	The Dragon and the Unicorn	Finalist
1953	Jesse Stuart	Kentucky is My Land	Finalist
1953	Ridgley Torrence	Poems	Finalist
1953	Peter Viereck	First Morning: First Poems	Finalist
1954	Conrad Aiken	Collected Poems	Winner
1955	Wallace Stevens	The Collected Poems of Wallace Stevens †	Winner
1955	Léonie Adams	Poems: A Selection	Finalist
1955	Louise Brogan	Collected Poems, 1923–1953	Finalist
1955	E. E. Cummings	Poems, 1923–1954	Finalist
1955	Robinson Jeffers	Hungerfield and Other Poems	Finalist
1955	Archibald MacLeish	Songs for Eve	Finalist
1955	Phyllis McGinley	The Love Letters of Phyllis McGinley	Finalist
1955	Merrill Moore	The Verse Diary of a Psychiatrist	Finalist
1955	LeRoy Smith	A Character Invented	Finalist
1955	May Swenson	Another Animal	Finalist
1955	William Carlos Williams	The Desert Music and Other Poems	Finalist
1955	Marya Zaturenska	Selected Poems	Finalist
1956	W. H. Auden	The Shield of Achilles	Winner
1956	Elizabeth Bishop	Poems, North and South†	Finalist
1956	John Ciardi	As If	Finalist
1956	Isabella Gardner	Birthdays from the Ocean	Finalist
1956	Donald Hall	Exiles and Marriages	Finalist
1956	Randall Jarrell	Selected Poems	Finalist
1956	Adrienne Rich	The Diamond Cutters	Finalist
1956	William Carlos Williams	Journey to Love	Finalist
1957	Richard Wilbur	Things of This World †	Winner
1957	Egar Bowers	The Form of Loss	Finalist
1957	Leah Bodine Drake	This Tilting Dust	Finalist
1957	Charles E. Eaton	Greenhouse in the Garden	Finalist
1957	Kenneth Fearing	New and Selected Poems	Finalist
1957	Robert Fitzgerald	In the Rose of Time: Poems, 1939–1956	Finalist
1957	Katherine Hoskins	Villa Narcisse	Finalist
1957	Rolph Humphries	Green Armor on Green Ground	Finalist
1957	Joseph Langland	Poems in POEMS OF TODAY, III	Finalist
1957	Anne Morrow Lindbergh	The Unicorn	Finalist
1957	W. S. Merwin	Green with Beasts	Finalist
1957	Marianne Moore	Like a Bulwark	Finalist
1957	Ezra Pound	Section: Rock Drill	Finalist
1957	Kenneth Rexroth	In Defense of the Earth	Finalist
1957	John Hall Wheelock	Poems of Old and New	Finalist
1958	Robert Penn Warren	Promises: Poems, 1954–1956 †	Winner
1958	Daniel Berrigan	Time without Number	Finalist
1958	Phillip Booth	Letter from a Distant Land	Finalist
1958	Edwin G. Burrows	The Arctic Tern	Finalist
1958	Hilda Doolittle	The Selected Poems of H.D.	Finalist
1958	Richard Eberhart	Great Praises	Finalist
1958	Richmond Lattimore	Poems	Finalist
1958	Howard Moss	Swimmer in the Air	Finalist
1958	May Sarton	In Time Like Air	Finalist
1958	Eli Siegel	Hot Afternoons Have Been in Montana	Finalist
1958	William Jay Smith	Poems: 1947–1957	Finalist
1958	Wallace Stevens	Opus Posthumous	Finalist
1958	James Wright	The Green Wall	Finalist
1959	Theodore Roethke	Words for the Wind: Poems of Theodore Roethke	Winner
1959	John Ciardi	I Marry You	Finalist
1959	E. E. Cummings	Selected Poems, 1923–1958	Finalist
1959	Archibald MacLeish	J.B.	Finalist
1959	Howard Nemerov	Mirrors and Windows	Finalist
1959	Theodore Roethke	Collected Poems	Finalist
1959	Karl Shapiro	Poems of a Jew	Finalist
1959	May Swenson	A Cage of Spines	Finalist
1959	William Carlos Williams	Paterson: Book Five	Finalist
1960	Robert Lowell	Life Studies	Winner
1961	Randall Jarrell	The Woman at the Washington Zoo: Poems and Translations	Winner
1961	W. H. Auden	Homage to Clio	Finalist
1961	J. V. Cunningham	The Exclusions of Rhyme	Finalist
1961	Robert Duncan	The Opening of the Field	Finalist
1961	Richard Eberhart	Collected Poems	Finalist
1961	Donald Justice	The Summer Anniversaries	Finalist
1961	Howard Nemerov	New and Selected Poems	Finalist
1961	John Frederick Nims	Knowledge of the Evening	Finalist
1961	Anne Sexton	To Bedlam and Part Way Back	Finalist
1961	George Starbuck	Bone Thoughts	Finalist
1961	Eleanor Ross Taylor	Wilderness of Ladies	Finalist
1961	Theodore Weiss	Outlanders	Finalist
1961	Yvor Winters	Collected Poems	Finalist
1962	Alan Dugan	Poems †	Winner
1962	Robert Bagg	Madonna of the Cello	Finalist
1962	Phillip Booth	The Islanders	Finalist
1962	John Ciardi	In the Stoneworks	Finalist
1962	Hilda Doolittle	Helen in Egypt	Finalist
1962	Abbie Huston Evans	Faces of Crystal	Finalist
1962	Isabella Gardner	The Looking Glass	Finalist
1962	Horace Gregory	Medusa in Gramercy Park	Finalist
1962	John Holmes	The Fortune Teller	Finalist
1962	Denise Levertov	The Jacob's Ladder	Finalist
1962	Ned O'Gorman	Adam Before His Mirror	Finalist
1962	John Hall Wheelock	The Gardner and other Poems	Finalist
1963	William Stafford	Traveling Through the Dark	Winner
1963	Robert Creeley	For Love	Finalist
1963	Donald F. Drummond	The Drawbridge	Finalist
1963	Robert Frost	In the Clearing	Finalist
1963	Kenneth Koch	Thank You and Other Poems	Finalist
1963	Howard Nemerov	The Next Room of the Dream	Finalist
1963	Winfield T. Scott	Collected Poems	Finalist
1963	Anne Sexton	All My Pretty Ones	Finalist
1963	William Carlos Williams	Pictures from Brueghel †	Finalist
1964	John Crowe Ransom	Selected Poems	Winner
1964	W. S. Merwin	The Moving Target	Finalist
1964	Louis Simpson	At the End of the Open Road †	Finalist
1964	May Swenson	To Mix With Time	Finalist
1965	Theodore Roethke	The Far Field (posth.)	Winner
1965	Ben Belitt	The Enemy Joy	Finalist
1965	John Berryman	77 Dream Songs †	Finalist
1965	James Dickey	Helmets	Finalist
1965	Galway Kinnell	Flower Herding on Mount Monadnock	Finalist
1965	Robert Lowell	For the Union Dead	Finalist
1965	William Meredith	The Wreck of the Thresher	Finalist
1966	James Dickey	Buckdancer's Choice: Poems	Winner
1966	W. H. Auden	About the House	Finalist
1966	Elizabeth Bishop	Questions of Travel	Finalist
1966	Richard Eberhart	Selected Poems (1930–1965) †	Finalist
1966	Irving Feldman	The Pripet Marshes	Finalist
1966	Randall Jarrell	The Lost World	Finalist
1966	Louis Simpson	Selected Poems	Finalist
1967	James Merrill	Nights and Days	Winner
1967	John Ashbery	Rivers and Mountains	Finalist
1967	Barbara Howes	Looking Up at the Leaves	Finalist
1967	Marianne Moore	Tell Me, Tell Me	Finalist
1967	Adrienne Rich	Necessities of Life	Finalist
1967	William Jay Smith	The Tin Can and Other Poems	Finalist
1968	Robert Bly	The Light Around the Body	Winner
1968	Theodosius Dobzhansky	The Biology of Ultimate Concern	Finalist
1968	Denise Levertov	The Sorrow Dance	Finalist
1968	W. S. Merwin	The Lice	Finalist
1968	Kenneth Rexroth	Complete Poems	Finalist
1968	Louis Zukofsky	A-12	Finalist
1969	John Berryman	His Toy, His Dream, His Rest	Winner
1969	Gwendolyn Brooks	In the Mecca	Finalist
1969	Galway Kinnell	Body Rags	Finalist
1969	John Thompson	The Talking Girl	Finalist
1969	Keith Waldrop	A Windmill Near Calvary	Finalist
1970	Elizabeth Bishop	The Complete Poems	Winner
1970	Daniel Berrigan	False Gods, Real Men	Finalist
1970	Lawrence Ferlinghetti	The Secret Meaning of Things	Finalist
1970	Robert Lowell	Notebook, 1967–68	Finalist
1970	Philip Whalen	On Bear's Head	Finalist
1971	Mona Van Duyn	To See, to Take: Poems	Winner
1971	Gregory Corso	Elegiac Feelings American	Finalist
1971	W. S. Merwin	The Carrier of Ladders †	Finalist
1971	May Swenson	Iconographs	Finalist
1972	Frank O'Hara	The Collected Poems of Frank O'Hara (posth.)	Winner (Note: The Poetry panels split the 1972, 1974, and 1983 awards. Split awards have been prohibited continuously from 1984 (and the same reform eliminated the Poetry category, restored 1992).)
1972	Howard Moss	Selected Poems	Winner
1972	A. R. Ammons	Briefings: Poems Small and Easy	Finalist
1972	Jon Anderson	Death & Friends	Finalist
1972	Robert Fitzgerald	Spring Shade: Poems, 1931–1970	Finalist
1972	Robert Hayden	Words in the Mourning Time	Finalist
1972	John Hollander	The Night Mirror	Finalist
1972	Galway Kinnell	The Book of Nightmares	Finalist
1972	David Shapiro	A Man Holding an Acoustic Panel	Finalist
1972	Allen Tate	The Swimmers and Other Selected Poems	Finalist
1972	James Wright	Collected Poems †	Finalist
1973	A. R. Ammons	Collected Poems, 1951–1971	Winner
1973	W. H. Auden	Epistle to a Godson and Other Poems	Finalist
1973	John Berryman	Delusions, Etc.	Finalist
1973	Richard Eberhart	Fields of Grace	Finalist
1973	Samuel Hazo	Once for the Last Bandit	Finalist
1973	John Hollander	Town and Country Matters	Finalist
1973	Denise Levertov	FootPrints	Finalist
1973	Archibald MacLeish	The Human Season	Finalist
1973	James Merrill	Braving the Elements	Finalist
1973	Frederick Morgan	A Book of Change	Finalist
1973	Ishmael Reed	Conjure	Finalist
1973	Louis Simpson	Adventures of the Letter I	Finalist
1974	Adrienne Rich	Diving into the Wreck: Poems 1971–1972	Winner
1974	Allen Ginsberg	The Fall of America: Poems of These States, 1965–1971	Winner
1974	Hayden Carruth	From Snow and Rock, from Chaos	Finalist
1974	Evan S. Connell Jr.	Points for a Compass Rose	Finalist
1974	Peter Everwine	Collecting the Animals	Finalist
1974	Richard Hugo	The Lady in Kicking Horse Reservoir	Finalist
1974	Donald Justice	Departures	Finalist
1974	Eleanor Lerman	Armed Love	Finalist
1974	Audre Lorde	From a Land Where Other People Live	Finalist
1974	Alice Walker	Revolutionary Petunias and Other Poems	Finalist
1974	Charles Wright	Hard Freight	Finalist
1975	Marilyn Hacker	Presentation Piece	Winner
1975	A. R. Ammons	Sphere: The Form of a Motion	Finalist
1975	John Balaban	After Our War	Finalist
1975	Albert Goldbarth	Jan 31	Finalist
1975	Richard Howard	Two-Part Inventions	Finalist
1975	Josephine Jacobsen	The Shade-Seller	Finalist
1975	Michael Ryan	Threats Instead of Trees	Finalist
1975	Susan Fromberg Schaeffer	Granite Lady	Finalist
1975	David Wagoner	Sleeping in the Woods	Finalist
1975	Reed Whittemore	The Mother's Breast and the Father's House	Finalist
1976	John Ashbery	Self-Portrait in a Convex Mirror †	Winner
1976	Richard Hugo	What Thou Lovest Well, Remains American	Finalist
1976	P.J. Laska	D.C. Images	Finalist
1976	John N. Morris	The Life Beside This One	Finalist
1976	Leonard Nathan	Returning Your Call	Finalist
1976	George Oppen	Collected Poems	Finalist
1976	Carolyn M. Rodgers	How I Got Ovah	Finalist
1976	Sherley Anne Williams	The Peacock Poems	Finalist
1977	Richard Eberhart	Collected Poems, 1930–1976: Including 43 New Poems	Winner
1977	Irving Feldman	Leaping Clear and Other Poems	Finalist
1977	Margaret Newlin	The Snow Falls Upward	Finalist
1977	Muriel Rukeyser	The Gates	Finalist
1977	David Wagoner	Collected Poems, 1956–1976	Finalist
1978	Howard Nemerov	The Collected Poems of Howard Nemerov †	Winner
1978	Marvin Bell	Stars Which See, Stars Which Do Not See	Finalist
1978	Michael S. Harper	Images of Kin	Finalist
1978	Barbara Howes	A Private Signal	Finalist
1978	Charles Simic	Charon's Cosmology	Finalist
1979	James Merrill	Mirabell: Books of Number	Winner
1979	Robert Hayden	American Journal	Finalist
1979	Sandra McPherson	The Year of Our Birth	Finalist
1979	Philip Schultz	Like Wings	Finalist
1979	May Swenson	New & Selected Things Taking Place	Finalist
1980	Philip Levine	Ashes: Poems New and Old	Winner
1980	Stanley Kunitz	The Poems of Stanley Kunitz	Finalist
1980	David Wagoner	In Broken Country	Finalist
1981	Lisel Mueller	The Need to Hold Still: Poems	Winner
1981	Philip Booth	Before Sleep	Finalist
1981	Isabella Gardner	That Was Then	Finalist
1981	Mark Strand	Selected Poems*	Finalist
1981	Robert Penn Warren	Being Here	Finalist
1982	William Bronk	Life Supports: New and Collected Poems	Winner
1982	A. R. Ammons	A Coast of Trees	Finalist
1982	John Ashbery	Shadow Train	Finalist
1982	Douglas Crase	The Revisionist	Finalist
1982	Daniel Hoffman	Brotherly Love	Finalist
1983	Galway Kinnell	Selected Poems †	Winner
1983	Charles Wright	Country Music: Selected Early Poems*	Winner
1983	Mona Van Duyn	Letters from a Father and Other Poems	Finalist
1983	Jack Gilbert	Monolithos*	Finalist
1983	Linda Pastan	PM/AM	Finalist
Not awarded 1984 – 1990
1991	Philip Levine	What Work Is	Winner
1991	Andrew Hudgins	The Never-Ending	Finalist
1991	Linda McCarriston	Eva-Mary	Finalist
1991	Adrienne Rich	An Atlas of the Difficult World: Poems 1988–1991*	Finalist
1991	Marilyn Nelson Waniek	The Homeplace: Poems	Finalist
1992	Mary Oliver	New and Selected Poems (vol. 1 of two)	Winner
1992	Hayden Carruth	Collected Shorter Poems	Finalist
1992	Louise Glück	The Wild Iris †	Finalist
1992	Susan Mitchell	Rapture	Finalist
1992	Gary Snyder	No Nature	Finalist
1993	A. R. Ammons	Garbage	Winner
1993	Mark Doty	My Alexandria	Finalist
1993	Margaret Gibson	The Vigil: A Poem in Four Voices	Finalist
1993	Donald Hall	The Museum of Clear Ideas	Finalist
1993	Lawrence Raab	What We Don't Know About Each Other	Finalist
1994	James Tate	Worshipful Company of Fletchers	Winner
1994	Richard Howard	Like Most Revelations	Finalist
1994	David St. John	A Study for the World's Body	Finalist
1994	Heather McHugh	Hinge and Sign: Poems, 1968–1993	Finalist
1994	Anne Porter	An Altogether Different Language	Finalist
1995	Stanley Kunitz	Passing Through: The Later Poems	Winner
1995	Barbara Howes	Collected Poems, 1945–1990	Finalist
1995	Josephine Jacobsen	In the Crevice of Time: New and Collected Poems	Finalist
1995	Donald Justice	New and Selected Poems*	Finalist
1995	Gary Soto	New and Selected Poems	Finalist
1996	Hayden Carruth	Scrambled Eggs & Whiskey: Poems, 1991–1995	Winner
1996	Lucille Clifton	The Terrible Stories	Finalist
1996	Robert Hass	Sun Under Wood	Finalist
1996	Alicia Suskin Ostriker	The Crack in Everything	Finalist
1996	Charles Simic	Walking the Black Cat	Finalist
1997	William Meredith	Effort at Speech: New and Selected Poems	Winner
1997	John Balaban	Locusts at the Edge of Summer: New and Selected Poems	Finalist
1997	Frank Bidart	Desire*	Finalist
1997	Sarah Lindsay	Primate Behavior	Finalist
1997	Marilyn Nelson	The Fields of Praise: New and Selected Poems	Finalist
1998	Gerald Stern	This Time: New and Selected Poems	Winner
1998	B. H. Fairchild	The Art of the Lathe	Finalist
1998	Alicia Suskin Ostriker	The Little Space: Poems Selected and New, 1968–1998	Finalist
1998	Linda Pastan	Carnival Evening: New and Selected Poems 1968–1998	Finalist
1998	Carl Phillips	From the Devotions	Finalist
1999	Ai	Vice: New and Selected Poems	Winner
1999	Louise Glück	Vita Nova	Finalist
1999	Clarence Major	Configurations: New and Selected Poems, 1958–1998	Finalist
1999	Sherod Santos	The Pilot Star Elegies	Finalist
1999	C.K. Williams	Repair†	Finalist
2000	Lucille Clifton	Blessing the Boats: New and Selected Poems 1988–2000	Winner
2000	Kim Addonizio	Tell Me	Finalist
2000	Galway Kinnell	A New Selected Poems	Finalist
2000	Kenneth Koch	New Addresses: Poems	Finalist
2000	Bruce Smith	The Other Lover*	Finalist
2001	Alan Dugan	Poems Seven: New and Complete Poetry	Winner
2001	Agha Shahid Ali	Rooms are Never Finished	Finalist
2001	Wanda Coleman	Mercurochrome	Finalist
2001	Cornelius Eady	Brutal Imagination	Finalist
2001	Gail Mazur	They Can't Take That Away from Me	Finalist
2002	Ruth Stone	In the Next Galaxy	Winner
2002	Harryette Mullen	Sleeping with the Dictionary	Finalist
2002	Sharon Olds	The Unswept Room	Finalist
2002	Alberto Rios	The Smallest Muscle in the Human Body	Finalist
2002	Ellen Bryant Voigt	Shadow of Heaven	Finalist
2003	C. K. Williams	The Singing	Winner
2003	Carol Muske-Dukes	Sparrow	Finalist
2003	Charles Simic	The Voice at 3:00 A.M.: Selected Late and New Poems	Finalist
2003	Louis Simpson	The Owner of the House: New Collected Poems 1940–2001	Finalist
2003	Kevin Young	Jelly Roll: A Blues	Finalist
2004	Jean Valentine	Door in the Mountain: New and Collected Poems, 1965–2003	Winner
2004	William Heyen	Shoah Train	Finalist
2004	Donald Justice	Collected Poems	Finalist
2004	Carl Phillips	The Rest of Love	Finalist
2004	Cole Swensen	Goest	Finalist
2005	W. S. Merwin	Migration: New and Selected Poems	Winner
2005	John Ashbery	Where Shall I Wander: New Poems	Finalist
2005	Frank Bidart	Star Dust: Poems	Finalist
2005	Brendan Galvin	Habitat: New and Selected Poems, 1965–2005	Finalist
2005	Vern Rutsala	The Moment's Equation	Finalist
2006	Nathaniel Mackey	Splay Anthem	Winner
2006	Louise Glück	Averno	Finalist
2006	H. L. Hix	Chromatic	Finalist
2006	Ben Lerner	Angle of Yaw	Finalist
2006	James L. McMichael	Capacity	Finalist
2007	Robert Hass	Time and Materials: Poems, 1997–2005†	Winner
2007	Linda Gregerson	Magnetic North	Finalist
2007	David Kirby	The House on Boulevard St.	Finalist
2007	Stanley Plumly	Old Heart	Finalist
2007	Ellen Bryant Voigt	Messenger: New and Selected Poems 1976–2006*	Finalist
2008	Mark Doty	Fire to Fire: New and Selected Poems	Winner
2008	Frank Bidart	Watching the Spring Festival*	Finalist
2008	Reginald Gibbons	Creatures of a Day	Finalist
2008	Richard Howard	Without Saying	Finalist
2008	Patricia Smith	Blood Dazzler	Finalist
2009	Keith Waldrop	Transcendental Studies: A Trilogy	Winner
2009	Rae Armantrout	Versed †	Finalist
2009	Ann Lauterbach	Or to Begin Again	Finalist
2009	Carl Phillips	Speak Low	Finalist
2009	Lyrae van Clief-Stefanon	Open Interval	Finalist
2010	Terrance Hayes	Lighthead	Winner
2010	Kathleen Graber	The Eternal City	Finalist
2010	James Richardson	By the Numbers	Finalist
2010	C.D. Wright	One with Others	Finalist
2010	Monica Youn	Ignatz	Finalist
2011	Nikky Finney	Head Off & Split: Poems	Winner
2011	Yusef Komunyakaa	The Chameleon Couch	Finalist
2011	Carl Phillips	Double Shadow	Finalist
2011	Adrienne Rich	Tonight No Poetry Will Serve: Poems: 2007–2010	Finalist
2011	Bruce Smith	Devotions	Finalist
2012	David Ferry	Bewilderment: New Poems and Translations	Winner
2012	Susan Wheeler	Meme	Finalist
2012	Cynthia Huntington	Heavenly Bodies	Finalist
2012	Tim Seibles	Fast Animal	Finalist
2012	Alan Shapiro	Night of the Republic	Finalist
2013	Mary Szybist	Incarnadine	Winner
2013	Frank Bidart	Metaphysical Dog	Finalist
2013	Lucie Brock-Broido	Stay, Illusion	Finalist
2013	Adrian Matejka	The Big Smoke*	Finalist
2013	Matt Rasmussen	Black Aperture	Finalist
2013	Roger Bonair-Agard	Bury My Clothes	Longlist
2013	Andrei Codrescu	So Recently Rent a World, New and Selected Poems: 1968–2012	Longlist
2013	Brenda Hillman	Seasonal Works with Letters on Fire	Longlist
2013	Diane Raptosh	American Amnesiac	Longlist
2013	Martha Ronk	Transfer of Qualities	Longlist
2014	Louise Glück	Faithful and Virtuous Night	Winner
2014	Fanny Howe	Second Childhood	Finalist
2014	Maureen N. McLane	This Blue	Finalist
2014	Fred Moten	The Feel Trio	Finalist
2014	Claudia Rankine	Citizen	Finalist
2014	Linda Bierds	Roget's Illusion	Longlist
2014	Brian Blanchfield	A Several World	Longlist
2014	Edward Hirsch	Gabriel: A Poem	Longlist
2014	Spencer Reece	The Road to Emmaus	Longlist
2014	Mark Strand	Collected Poems	Longlist
2015	Robin Coste Lewis	Voyage of the Sable Venus	Winner
2015	Ross Gay	Catalog of Unabashed Gratitude	Finalist
2015	Terrance Hayes	How to Be Drawn	Finalist
2015	Ada Limón	Bright Dead Things	Finalist
2015	Patrick Phillips	Elegy for a Broken Machine	Finalist
2015	Amy Gerstler	Scattered at Sea	Longlist
2015	Marilyn Hacker	A Stranger's Mirror	Longlist
2015	Jane Hirshfield	The Beauty	Longlist
2015	Lawrence Raab	Mistaking Each Other for Ghosts	Longlist
2015	Rowan Ricardo Phillips	Heaven	Longlist
2016	Daniel Borzutzky	The Performance of Becoming Human	Winner
2016	Rita Dove	Collected Poems 1974–2004	Finalist
2016	Peter Gizzi	Archeophonics	Finalist
2016	Jay Hopler	The Abridged History of Rainfall	Finalist
2016	Solmaz Sharif	Look	Finalist
2016	Donald Hall	The Selected Poems of Donald Hall	Longlist
2016	Donika Kelly	Bestiary	Longlist
2016	Jane Mead	World of Made and Unmade	Longlist
2016	Monica Youn	Blackacre	Longlist
2016	Kevin Young	Blue Laws	Longlist
2017	Frank Bidart	Half-light: Collected Poems 1965–2016 †	Winner
2017	Leslie Harrison	The Book of Endings	Finalist
2017	Layli Long Soldier	WHEREAS	Finalist
2017	Shane McCrae	In the Language of My Captor	Finalist
2017	Danez Smith	Don't Call Us Dead	Finalist
2017	Chen Chen	When I Grow Up I Want to Be a List of Further Possibilities	Longlist
2017	Mai Der Vang	Afterland	Longlist
2017	Marie Howe	Magdalene	Longlist
2017	Laura Kasischke	Where Now: New and Selected Poems	Longlist
2017	Sherod Santos	Square Inch Hours	Longlist
2018	Justin Phillip Reed	Indecency	Winner
2018	Rae Armantrout	Wobble	Finalist
2018	Terrance Hayes	American Sonnets for My Past and Future Assassin	Finalist
2018	Diana Khoi Nguyen	Ghost Of	Finalist
2018	Jenny Xie	Eye Level	Finalist
2018	Jos Charles	feeld*	Longlist
2018	Forrest Gander	Be With †	Longlist
2018	J. Michael Martinez	Museum of the Americas	Longlist
2018	Roque Salas Rivera	lo terciario / the tertiary	Longlist
2018	Natasha Trethewey	Monument: Poems New and Selected	Longlist
2019	Arthur Sze	Sight Lines	Winner
2019	Jericho Brown	The Tradition †	Finalist
2019	Toi Derricotte	"I": New and Selected Poems	Finalist
2019	Ilya Kaminsky	Deaf Republic	Finalist
2019	Carmen Giménez Smith	Be Recorder	Finalist
2019	Dan Beachy-Quick	Variations on Dawn and Dusk	Longlist
2019	Camonghne Felix	Build Yourself a Boat	Longlist
2019	Ariana Reines	A Sand Book	Longlist
2019	Mary Ruefle	Dunce*	Longlist
2019	Brian Teare	Doomstead Days	Longlist
2020	Don Mee Choi	DMZ Colony	Winner
2020	Mei-mei Berssenbrugge	A Treatise on Stars*	Finalist
2020	Tommye Blount	Fantasia for the Man in Blue	Finalist
2020	Anthony Cody	Borderland Apocrypha	Finalist
2020	Natalie Diaz	Postcolonial Love Poem †	Finalist
2020	Rick Barot	The Galleons	Longlist
2020	Lillian-Yvonne Bertram	Travesty Generator	Longlist
2020	Victoria Chang	Obit	Longlist
2020	Eduardo C. Corral	Guillotine	Longlist
2020	Honorée Fanonne Jeffers	The Age of Phillis	Longlist
2021	Martín Espada	Floaters	Winner
2021	Desiree C. Bailey	What Noise Against the Cane	Finalist
2021	Douglas Kearney	Sho	Finalist
2021	Hoa Nguyen	A Thousand Times You Lose Your Treasure	Finalist
2021	Jackie Wang	The Sunflower Cast a Spell To Save Us From The Void	Finalist
2021	Threa Almontaser	The Wild Fox of Yemen	Longlist
2021	Baba Badji	Ghost Letters	Longlist
2021	CM Burroughs	Master Suffering	Longlist
2021	Andrés Cerpa	The Vault	Longlist
2021	Forrest Gander	Twice Alive	Longlist
2022	John Keene	Punks: New & Selected Poems	Winner
2022	Allison Adelle Hedge Coke	Look at This Blue	Finalist
2022	Sharon Olds	Balladz	Finalist
2022	Roger Reeves	Best Barbarian	Finalist
2022	Jenny Xie	The Rupture Tense	Finalist
2022	Rio Cortez	Golden Ax	Longlist
2022	Jay Hopler	Still Life*	Longlist
2022	Sherry Shenoda	Mummy Eaters	Longlist
2022	Quincy Troupe	Duende	Longlist
2022	Shelley Wong	As She Appears	Longlist
2023	Craig Santos Perez	from unincorporated territory [åmot]	Winner
2023	John Lee Clark	How to Communicate	Finalist
2023	Evie Shockley	suddenly we	Finalist
2023	Brandon Som	Tripas †	Finalist
2023	Monica Youn	From From	Finalist
2023	Oliver de la Paz	The Diaspora Sonnets	Longlist
2023	Charif Shanahan	Trace Evidence	Longlist
2023	Paisley Rekdal	West: A Translation	Longlist
2023	Annelyse Gelman	Vexations	Longlist
2023	José Olivarez	Promises of Gold	Longlist
2024	Lena Khalaf Tuffaha	Something About Living	Winner
2024	Anne Carson	Wrong Norma	Finalist
2024	Fady Joudah	[...]	Finalist
2024	m.s. RedCherries	mother	Finalist
2024	Diane Seuss	Modern Poetry	Finalist
2024	Dorianne Laux	Life on Earth	Longlist
2024	Gregory Pardlo	Spectral Evidence	Longlist
2024	Octavio Quintanilla	The Book of Wounded Sparrows	Longlist
2024	Rowan Ricardo Phillips	Silver	Longlist
2024	Elizabeth Willis	Liontaming in America	Longlist
2025	Patricia Smith	The Intentions of Thunder: New and Selected Poems	Winner
2025	Gabrielle Calvocoressi	The New Economy	Finalist
2025	Cathy Linh Che	Becoming Ghost	Finalist
2025	Tiana Clark	Scorched Earth	Finalist
2025	Richard Siken	I Do Know Some Things	Finalist
2025	Gbenga Adesina	Death Does Not End at the Sea	Longlist
2025	Rickey Laurentiis	Death of the First Idea	Longlist
2025	Esther Lin	Cold Thief Place	Longlist
2025	Natalie Shapero	Stay Dead	Longlist
2025	Fargo Nissim Tbakhi	Terror Counter	Longlist
2026	Brenda Hillman	Still House in the Desert: An Eco-Contemplation	Winner
2026	Susan Stewart	Bramble	Finalist
2026	Fady Joudah	Exhibit G: Poems, Essays, and Photographs of Gaza	Finalist
2026	Carolina Ebeid	Hide	Finalist
2026	Victoria Chang	Tree of Knowledge	Finalist
2026	Richie Hoffman	The Bronze Arms	Longlist
2026	Layli Long Soldier	We	Longlist
2026	Jonah Mixon-Webster	Promise/Threat	Longlist
2026	Jake Rose	JOAN	Longlist
2026	Jake Skeets	Horses	Longlist

== Multiple wins ==
See Winners of multiple U.S. National Book Awards

The following individuals received two or more National Book Awards for Poetry:

Wins	Poet	Years
2	A. R. Ammons	1973, 1993
2	Alan Dugan	1962, 2001
2	Philip Levine	1980, 1991
2	James Merrill	1967, 1979
2	Theodore Roethke	1959, 1965
2	Wallace Stevens	1951, 1955

== See also ==
- Poetry of the United States
- List of poetry awards
- List of years in poetry
