= As She Appears =

2022 debut poetry collection by Shelley Wong

- Author: Shelley Wong
- Publication date: May 10, 2022
- Pages: 96
- Awards: Lambda Literary Award for Lesbian Poetry; YesYes Books Pamet River Prize
- ISBN: 978-1936919895

As She Appears is a 2022 debut poetry collection by Shelley Wong, published by YesYes Books. It won the 2023 Lambda Literary Award for Lesbian Poetry and was longlisted for the 2022 National Book Award for Poetry.

== Content ==
Many of the book's poems are set on Fire Island, a region of New York known for its LGBTQ community; throughout the book, in poems such as "Private Collection", Wong questions the region's representations—as well as representations in the entertainment industry—for whitewashing and centrally positions Asian American women on the island. Other locations in the book are the San Francisco Museum of Modern Art and the Marin Headlands; themes additionally include isolation and loneliness, such as in the poem "The Winter Forecast".

The book includes several pop culture references to Beyoncé, Lucy Liu, Frida Kahlo, Alice in Wonderland, and others.

== Background ==
In Frontier Poetry, Wong shared she had spent six years submitting the manuscript for publication, starting in 2014, a time that she later found "too early". She felt that the book was finally finished in 2019 when she wrote several poems during a residency at Fire Island. In 2020, during the COVID-19 pandemic and amid hate crimes suffered by Asian Americans, Wong wrote the very last piece of the book.

Wong named Incardine by Mary Szybist, Oculus by Sally Wen Mao, and Look by Solmaz Sharif as inspirations along the way of writing.

== Critical reception ==
Wong's manuscript for As She Appears won the 2019 YesYes Books Pamet River Prize, after which it was published by YesYes Books in 2022. The book was also a longlist for the 2022 Julie Suk Award and a finalist for the 2023 Northern California Book Award for Poetry.

In a starred review, Publishers Weekly called the book "incandescent" and lauded its celebration of queer and Asian American identity; it concluded: "This vivid collection sizzles with remarkable nimbleness and energy."

Critics observed the book's sense of identity. The Poetry Foundation stated "Clear-eyed about her otherness as a queer Asian American woman and about the ways in which love ironically illuminates the creative person’s need for solitude, Wong remains open to the possibility of bliss amid the world’s ongoing catastrophes." Poetry School called the book a "deeply self-aware, courageous, and lyrical collection" and appreciated Wong's blend "history, humour, and ecological metaphor" to describe the speaker's relationship to her identity and experiences. RHINO wrote that "From her vantage point as a queer Chinese American woman, Wong asks what it is to see and be seen. She realizes she must be viewer and creator, naming and inventing the world around her, a position at once powerful and lonely." Preposition analyzed the book's natural backdrops and stated "Such austere landscapes, lonely even at their most congested, serve Wong well as images for the precariousness of queer love."

Others observed Wong's relationship between self and world broadly speaking, specifically her usage of nature and environment. The Rumpus lauded Wong's longing for "a world where we are known and loved, and allowed to love who we want to love." Muzzle Magazine concluded that "Wong both invents and bears witness to a new space, a new possibility of self in a world both hostile and joyous, and always opening to new ways of being and becoming." Soapberry Review wrote: "If you're looking for a charming read about identity, self-discovery, and life, be sure to pick up Shelley Wong's debut poetry collection, As She Appears."
