= Shelley Wong =

American poet

- Education: University of California, Berkeley
- Occupation: Poet
- Writing career
- Language: English
- Notable works: As She Appears; Rare Birds
- Notable awards: Lambda Literary Award for Lesbian Poetry (2023)

Shelley Wong is an American poet. In 2022, she released her debut poetry collection, As She Appears, after winning the YesYes Books Pamet River Prize in 2019. Additionally, her poetry has appeared in the Kenyon Review, the New England Review, and other publications. Her work has been supported by the Vermont Studio Center, the Headlands Center for the Arts, the Fire Island Artist Residency, the San Francisco Arts Commission, among others.

== Early life and education ==
A fourth-generation Chinese American, Wong grew up in Southern California and later attended the University of California, Berkeley from 1998 to 2002 where she was a poetry editor for the undergraduate literary magazine, Ibid. During the 2000s, she lived in New York City and pursued careers in fashion design and journalism. Years later, she attended graduate school for creative writing at Ohio State University; there, she was a poetry editor for The Journal, the university's literary magazine.

== Career ==
Wong's poems have appeared in the Kenyon Review, the New England Review, the Academy of American Poets' Poem-A-Day segment, and others. Her Crazyhorse poem "The Spring Forecast" won a 2017 Pushcart Prize and was subsequently published in The Pushcart Prize XLI: Best of the Small Presses 2017 Edition. Wong's poetry has also appeared in the 2022 book, They Rise Like a Wave: An Anthology of Asian American Women Poets. She has additionally written essays for the Poetry Society of America, Electric Literature, and others. She has named Suji Kwock Kim, Sylvia Plath, Aracelis Girmay, Eduardo C. Corral, Brenda Shaughnessy, and Sally Wen Mao, among others, as influences on her work.

In 2017, Wong released a chapbook, titled Rare Birds, with Diode Editions, which was a "distilled" version of her thesis for Ohio State University. In 2019, Wong's manuscript, As She Appears, was selected for the YesYes Books Pamet River Prize, after which YesYes Books published it in 2022; Wong had been submitting the manuscript to various publishers since 2014. The book won the 2023 Lambda Literary Award for Lesbian Poetry, was longlisted for the 2022 National Book Award for Poetry and the 2022 Julie Suk Award, and was a finalist 2023 Northern California Book Award for Poetry. It was also given a starred review in Publishers Weekly.

Wong's work has been supported by various programs and residencies including the Vermont Studio Center and the I-Park Foundation. In 2017, Wong attended the Fire Island Artist Residency where much of her work on As She Appears culminated. The same year, she attended MacDowell for poetry. From 2019 to 2022, she was a California Writing Affiliate for the Headlands Center for the Arts. In 2022, Wong received $20,000 from the San Francisco Arts Commission to support her second poetry collection, a work "that considers early Chinese American history in the San Francisco Bay Area as a response to the anti-Asian pandemic present." In 2024, Wong was a Lucas Artists Fellow at the Montalvo Arts Center. She is also a Kundiman Fellow.
