= Split (poetry collection) =

2014 debut poetry collection by Cathy Linh Che

- Author: Cathy Linh Che
- Publisher: Alice James Books
- Publication date: May 6, 2014
- Pages: 80
- Awards: Kundiman Poetry Prize; Norma Farber First Book Award
- ISBN: 978-1938584053

Split is a 2014 debut poetry collection by American poet Cathy Linh Che, published by Alice James Books. It won the Kundiman Poetry Prize in 2012 and was named a "standout book of the year" by the Academy of American Poets. It additionally was selected by Adrian Matejka for the Norma Farber First Book Award.

== Background ==
Che wrote the book's poems based on the stories of her parents during the Vietnam War and after resettlement in the wake of the Fall of Saigon, as well as her own experiences as a survivor. In The Margins, Che stated:

My parents have been telling me their stories of Vietnam throughout my life, and it seemed to me that in movies, newspapers, literature, their voices and stories were egregiously absent. I wanted to address this absence by writing their stories—and really, my story, our Vietnamese and American and Vietnamese American story—so that they could participate in the polyphony of voices constructing the American narrative.

Of the title, Che stated that it was a reference to a litany of traumas: "geographical, sexual, psychological, emotional."

== Book tour ==
After the book's release, Che organized a nationwide book tour, with Sally Wen Mao, Michelle Chan Brown, and Eugenia Leigh, called the Honey Badgers Don't Give a B**k Tour.

== Critical reception ==
Publishers Weekly observed Che's usage of poetry to address pasts, presents, and futures of violence and trauma, which "Che navigates with brutality and tenderness, devastation and irrepressible endurance."

American Poets called Che's a "book suffused with pain—both inherited and lived-through—love is its relentless redemptive force, in all its complex and troubled forms, filial and erotic."

Los Angeles Review called the book a graceful and powerful attempt toward the "nearly impossible challenge" of tackling intergenerational trauma through poetry.

DVAN called Che's language "brave," as well as "Lucid and visceral—and brutal" with regard to its approach to Vietnamese history and the Vietnamese American diaspora.

Compulsive Reader called the book "an honest piece of literature" and stated that "What [Che] sees—including significant events that impact her personal and familial life—she puts on paper in ways that approach mastery of the art of poetry."

Soapberry Review observed the book's interrogation of silence, concluding that "Split makes it evident that the trauma to which Asian and Asian American women have been subjugated to is the trauma that displaces, dysfunctions, and demeans one’s voice."

Jet Fuel Review concluded that "Che beautifully captures the healing process the speaker undergoes after reopening personal, cultural, and historical wounds. Split is an artifact that bridges the narratives of the past, present, and future and needs to be handled with the respect it deserves."
