= Rio Cortez =

American Poet

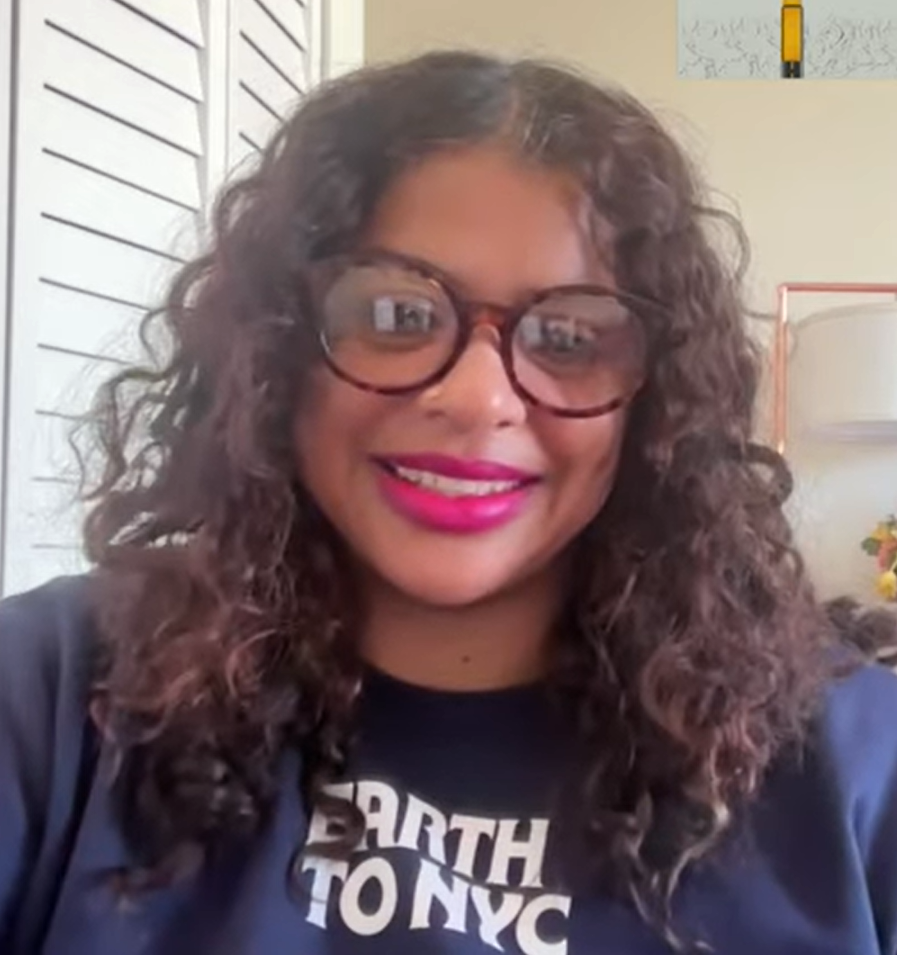
- In a 2025 interview
- Education: New York University
- Occupation: Writer

Rio Cortez is an American poet, children's book author, and essayist, best known for her children's book The ABCs of Black History (2020), and her poetry collection Golden Ax (2022), which was shortlisted for the 2022 National Book Award for Poetry, the PEN America Open Book Award, and the Norma Farber First Book Award.

== Early life and education ==
Rio Cortez was raised in Salt Lake City. Her experience growing up black, Hispanic, and non-Mormon in Utah informs much of her poetry and writing, especially Golden Ax, which explores Cortez's personal history in Salt Lake, as well as the history of African Americans in Utah.

Cortez holds an MFA in Creative Writing from New York University, and lives in Harlem, New York.

== Bibliography ==
=== Children's books ===
- The River is My Ocean. Denene Millner Books/Simon & Schuster Books for Young Readers (August 27, 2024).
- The ABCs of Black History. Workman (2020).
- The ABCS of Women's History. Workman (2025).
- The Blue Velvet Chair. Denene Millner Books/Simon & Schuster Books for Young Readers (August 19, 2025).

=== Poems and essays ===
- "Climbing Together", This Is Not a Small Voice
- "Heaven, to Leave with a Book", Prose to the People
- "The Velvet Still", Going Dark: The Contemporary Figure at the Edge of Visibility
- "Arches", Mother Tongue Magazine
- "The Idea of Ancestry", Deseret Magazine
- "Rio Cortez on Afropioneerism, Afrofrontierism, and Family Histories Real or Imagined", Literary Hub
- "Covered Wagon As Spaceship" & "Eden", Adroit Journal
- "Black Frasier Crane", The New Yorker
- "Ars Poetica with Mother and Dogs", The Atlantic
- "Emancipation Queen".
- "Black Lead in a Nancy Meyers Film".
- "I Learn to Shoot a Bow", The Atlantic
- "Driving at Night", Poets.org
- "I Want to Talk About Being Black and Pregnant", Mother Mag
- "UFO, For Instance". Poetry Society of America
- "Visiting Whitney Plantation", Buzzfeed
- "I Have Learned to Define a Field as a Space Between Mountains", Jai-Alai Magazine
- Annotated version of "Black Annie Hall", The Miami Rail
- "Bellum", The Offing
- "To Salt Lake, Letter Regarding Genealogy", The Offing
- "North Node", Cortland Review
- "Self Portrait in a Tanning Bed", Poet's House Emerging Fellows Archive
- "Havana Ghazal", Huizache
- "I'm Forced to Imagine There Are Two of Me Here", Huizache
- "Black Annie Hall", Prairie Schooner
- "Carrion", Prairie Schooner
- "It's Like That Scene in Annie Hall Where Annie Leaves Her Body", Sugar House Review
- "Salt Lake", Sugar House Review

=== Poetry collections ===
- Golden Ax

== See also ==
- Black Mormons
