= Tiana Clark =

American poet

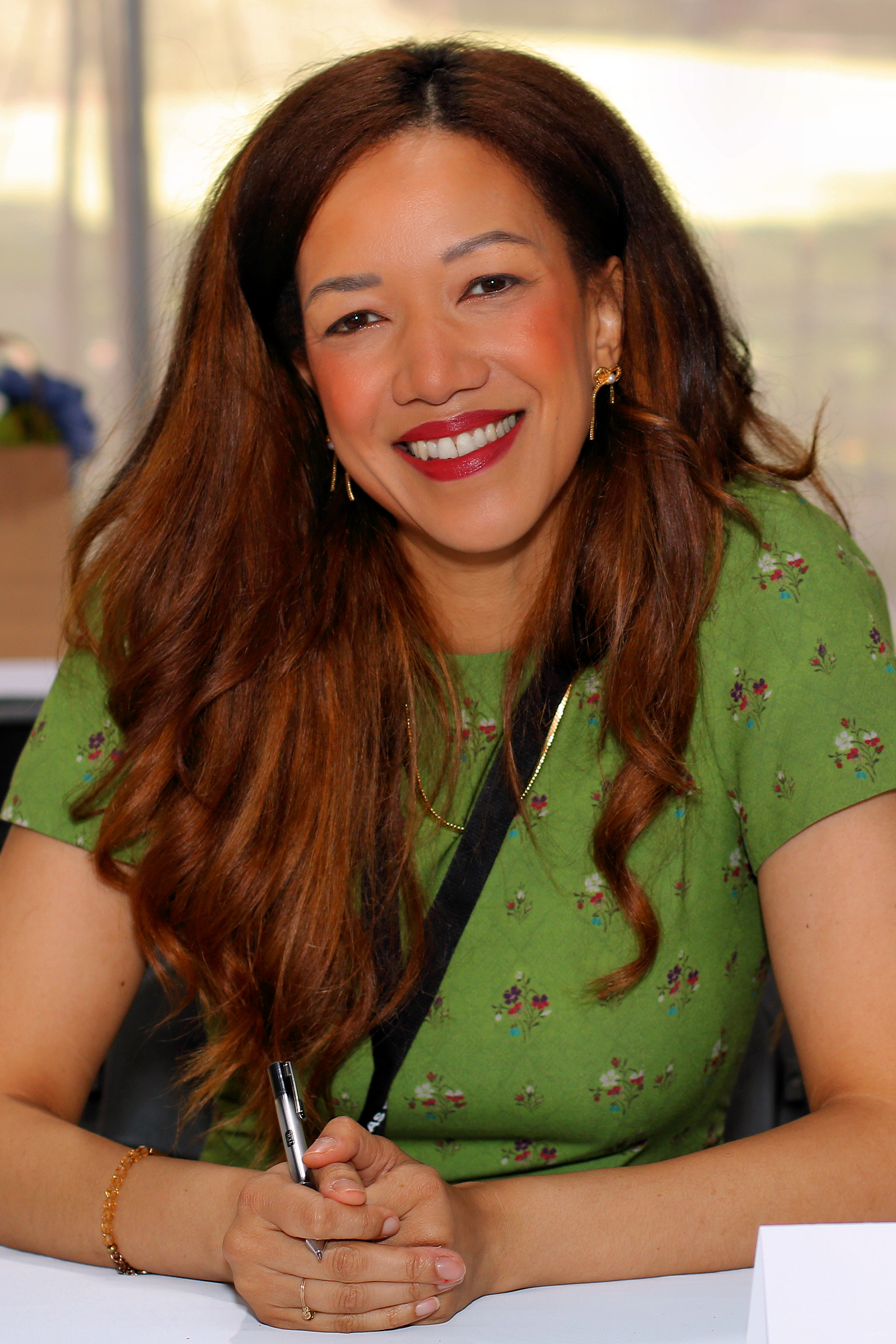
- Clark at the 2025 Texas Book Festival
- Education: Tennessee State University; Vanderbilt University
- Occupation: Poet
- Writing career
- Genre: Poetry
- Notable works: Equilibrium; I Can't Talk About the Trees Without the Blood; Scorched Earth
- Notable awards: Pushcart Prize; Kate Tufts Discovery Award
- Website: www.tianaclark.com

Tiana Clark is an American poet. She is the author of the chapbook Equilibrium (2016) and the poetry collections I Can't Talk About the Trees Without the Blood (2018) and Scorched Earth (2025). Her honors include the Rattle Poetry Prize, a Pushcart Prize, and the Kate Tufts Discovery Award, among others. In 2025, Scorched Earth was a finalist for the National Book Award for Poetry.

== Early life and education ==
Clark was raised in Nashville, Tennessee, and southern California. She earned a B.A. in Africana and Women's Studies from Tennessee State University and an M.F.A. from Vanderbilt University.

== Career ==
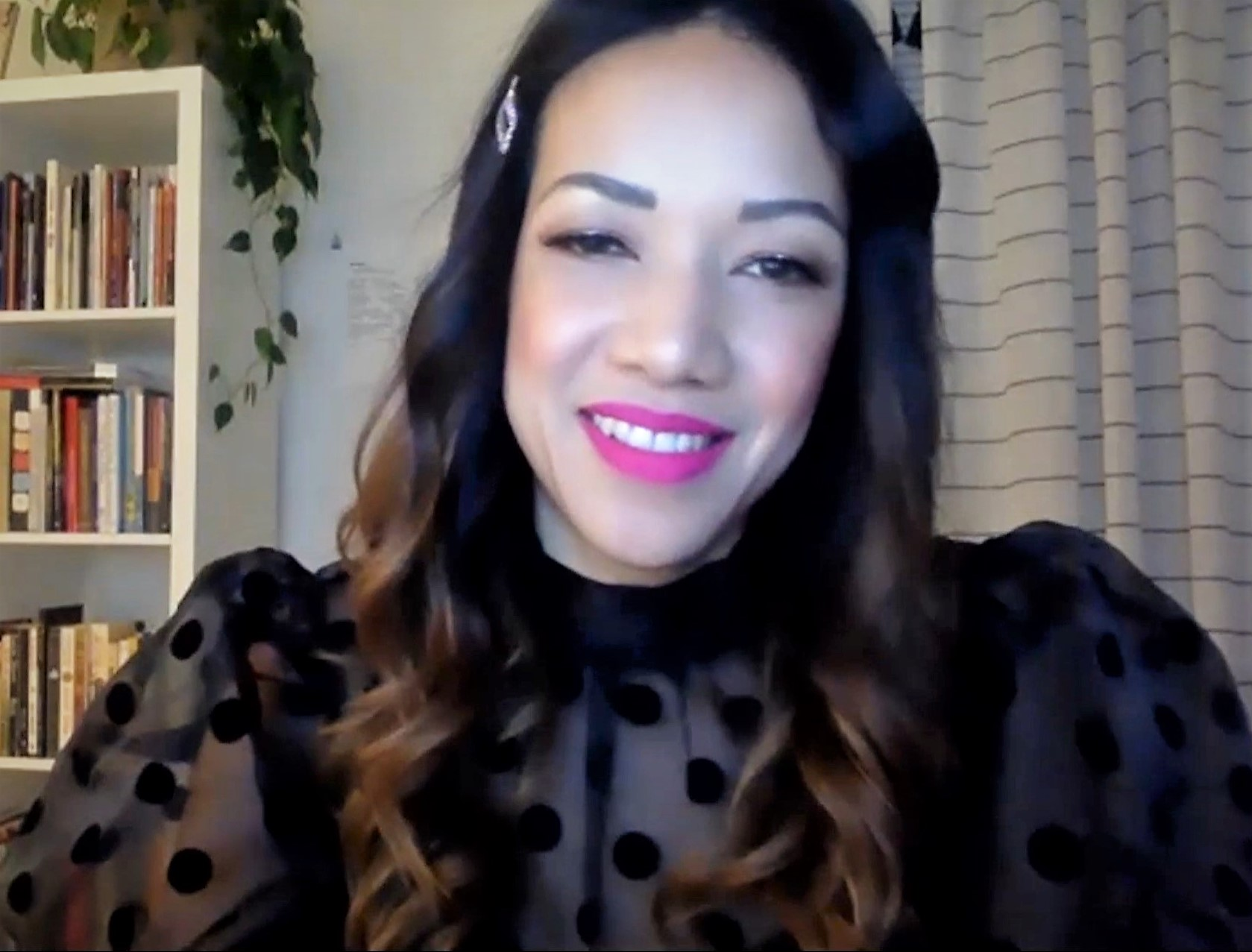
Clark reading at Franklin & Marshall College in 2021

While a student at Vanderbilt, Clark served on the staff of the Nashville Review, first as an assistant poetry editor and later as poetry editor. In 2015, she won the Rattle Poetry Prize for her poem "Equilibrium". The poem later became the title poem of her chapbook Equilibrium, which was selected by Afaa Michael Weaver for the 2016 Frost Place Chapbook Competition and published by Bull City Press.

Clark's first full-length collection, I Can't Talk About the Trees Without the Blood, was published by the University of Pittsburgh Press in 2018 after winning the 2017 Agnes Lynch Starrett Poetry Prize. The book was reviewed by The Kenyon Review, the Nashville Scene, and Full Stop. The book later received the 2020 Kate Tufts Discovery Award.

Clark's poem "The Ayes Have It" was adapted into a Motionpoems short film directed by Savanah Leaf. Her poem "BBHMM" received a 2019 Pushcart Prize. Her poetry and prose have appeared in publications including The New Yorker, Poetry, Kenyon Review, New England Review, and Best New Poets 2015.

Clark has taught creative writing at Southern Illinois University Edwardsville and the Sewanee School of Letters. She is the Grace Hazard Conkling Writer-in-Residence at Smith College.

== Scorched Earth (poetry collection) ==
Clark's second full-length collection, Scorched Earth, was published by Washington Square Press in 2025.

=== Reception ===
Scorched Earth received critical attention. In a review for Chapter 16, Emily Choate wrote that Clark "takes emotional and formal risks" in the collection. In GBH, Callie Crossley described the book as "blending history, race, gender, and grief" in intimate poems. Time included the book on its list of The 100 Must-Read Books of 2025, calling it a work of grief, Black joy, vulnerability, and survival. The collection was a finalist for the 2025 National Book Award for Poetry.

== Awards and honors ==
- 2015 Rattle Poetry Prize
- 2016 Academy of American Poets University Prize
- 2017 Furious Flower's Gwendolyn Brooks Centennial Poetry Prize
- 2019 Pushcart Prize
- 2019 National Endowment for the Arts Creative Writing Fellowship
- 2020 Kate Tufts Discovery Award
- 2025 National Book Award for Poetry finalist for Scorched Earth

== Bibliography ==
=== Chapbook ===
- Equilibrium. Bull City Press, 2016. ISBN 9781495157646

=== Poetry collections ===
- I Can't Talk About the Trees Without the Blood. University of Pittsburgh Press, 2018. ISBN 9780822965589
- Scorched Earth. Washington Square Press, 2025. ISBN 9781668052075
