= Becoming Ghost =

2025 poetry collection by Cathy Linh Che

- Author: Cathy Linh Che
- Publisher: Washington Square Press
- Publication date: April 29, 2025
- Pages: 128
- ISBN: 978-1668088920

Becoming Ghost is a 2025 poetry collection by Cathy Linh Che and published by Washington Square Press. A companion to We Were the Scenery, a short film which Che produced and wrote, its poems chronicle the experiences of Che's family members who were cast as extras in Apocalypse Now directed by Francis Ford Coppola. It was a finalist for the National Book Award for Poetry.

== Critical reception ==
Electric Literature named Becoming Ghost one of the best poetry collections of 2025, observing its "infinite, global layers of context to what might first seem like a simple family drama."

Poetry Northwest said that "Harrowing, lyrical, surprisingly restrained at times while also fiercely visceral, Becoming Ghost is, above all, courageous in its willingness to confront the conflicts within the author’s own family without letting the world off the hook."
