= Katherine Hoskins =

American poet

Katherine de Montalant Hoskins (May 25, 1909 – May 26, 1988) was an American poet, short story writer, and playwright.

== Life ==
Born in Indian Head, Maryland to Katherine Peck Lackey and U.S. Navy Rear-Admiral Henry Ellis Lackey, Katherine was home-schooled until she was eleven. She attended Smith College, graduating with honors in 1931. In 1935, she married Albert L. Hoskins, Jr., a World War I veteran who worked as a probation officer in Boston; together they had one daughter, Camilla.

Although Hoskins did not publicize herself or her work, she corresponded with many prominent contemporaries (including Robert Lowell, John Crowe Ransom, and Wallace Stevens), all of whom regarded her work highly. Louis Simpson called her carefully crafted verse "superb." Robert Lowell was effusive in his jacket-cover praise for Excursions (1967), exclaiming "How much better she is than so many poets very much more famous!" Writing in The New York Times Book Review, William Meredith sounded a somewhat prophetic note with the remark that "Katherine Hoskins' poems are so austerely excellent—and this is said without cynicism—that there is danger of their not being noticed at all." Louise Bogan, fourth United States Poet Laureate, however, was a severe critic of her work, stating, "As for style, she dispenses at will with that accepted rule of modern prosody-natural words in the natural order. Syntactical inversions abound; impenetrable and peculiar modifiers accompany equally odd nouns and verbs."

Despite her low public profile, Hoskins contributed during her lifetime to The Nation, The New Republic, The New Yorker, Poetry, The Sewanee Review and The Yale Review.

== Awards ==
Hoskins' honors include a 1957 Brandeis University Creative Writing Award and a 1958 Guggenheim fellowship. Her papers are housed at the University of Delaware.

== Poetry collections ==
- A Penitential Primer (1945)
- Villa Narcisse (1956)
- Out in the Open (1959)
- Excursions (1967)
