= Golden Axe (disambiguation) =

Golden Axe is a series of beat-em-up video games.

Golden Axe may also refer to:

- Golden Axe (video game), the first game in the series
- Golden Axe (TV series), a 2026 TV series based on the video game
- "The Golden Axe", or "The Honest Woodcutter", one of Aesop's Fables

== See also ==
- Golden Ax, a 2022 poetry collection by Rio Cortez
