= Josephine Jacobsen =

American-Canadian poet

- Born: Josephine Winder Boylan; August 19, 1908; Cobourg, Ontario, Canada
- Died: July 9, 2003 (aged 94); Cockeysville, Maryland U.S.
- Occupations: Spouse; Mother; writer
- Children: 1
- Writing career
- Genres: Poetry, short stories, reviews
- Notable works: In the Crevice of Time: New and Collected Poems (1995) won the Poets' Prize.

Josephine Jacobsen (19 August 1908 – 9 July 2003) was a Canadian-born American poet, short story writer, essayist, and critic. She was appointed the twenty-first Poet Laureate Consultant in Poetry to the Library of Congress in 1971. In 1997, she received the Poetry Society of America's highest award, the Robert Frost Medal for Lifetime Achievement in Poetry.

== Early life and education ==
Jacobsen was born Josephine Boylan on August 19, 1908, in Cobourg, Ontario, Canada. Her American parents were vacationing in Canada and anticipated her arrival several months later. The baby Jacobsen weighed only two-and-a-half pounds and was not expected to survive. However, her mother, Octavia Winder Boylan, was determined that she would survive. Jacobsen was taken to New York at age three months.

Jacobsen's father, a doctor and amateur Egyptologist, died when she was five. Her brother suffered a nervous breakdown; her mother suffered bouts of manic depression. Jacobsen found solace in reading the poetry of Robert W. Service and Rudyard Kipling and they inspired her to begin writing poetry.

After her father's death, Josephine and her mother traveled constantly, which prevented her from going to school. They did not settle in one place long enough for Josephine to go to school. Taught by private tutors, she became a voracious reader.

At age fourteen, Jacobsen moved to Maryland with her mother and lived there until her death. There she was, again, educated by private tutors at Roland Park Country School in Baltimore, graduating in 1926.

Jacobsen's mother never went to college, but like her daughter she was a "tremendous reader". Thus, it followed that when her daughter's headmistress suggested that Jacobsen go to college, her mother disagreed, so her daughter never attended college. Instead, Jacobsen "wrote, travelled, and acted with the Vagabond Players (a well-known Baltimore theatre troupe) until 1932 when she married".

== Career ==
Jacobsen's literary career began when her first poem was published in the children's St. Nicholas Magazine when she was 11 years old. Jacobsen described seeing her poem in print in St. Nicholas as the "most amazing feeling" and "a special occasion". She said that she thought, "I'm a professional poet at the age of 11." In her late teens, Jacobsen started publishing in the Junior League magazine Connected.

Jacobsen's first poetry collection, Let Each Man Remember, was published in 1940. However, she did not gain widespread recognition until her 60s. For Jacobsen, it was "the writing itself, not prizes or possible honors, that mattered the most". She also said that the "greatest thing" she can feel about one of her poems is that it has " helped another human being in a really bad time".

Her poem, 'Fiddler Crab", was written between 1950 and 1965. No exact date is available for the poem's exact publication. The poem may have been written between 1950 and 1965, but not published before its inclusion in the collection In the Crevice of Time: New and Collected Poems (1995).

Being a fan of the Baltimore Orioles baseball team, Jacobsen wrote poems on her love of baseball.

Short stories and nonfiction

Jacobsen also wrote short stories, including the collections A Walk with Raschid and Other Stories (1978), On the Island (1989), and What Goes Without Saying (1996).

Jacobsen's nonfiction writing includes reviews, lectures and essays for such publications as Commonweal, The Nation, and The Washington Post. In the late 1970s, she contributed op-ed and travel essays to the Baltimore Sun.

Much of Jacobsen's best work was done in her sixties, seventies, and eighties. Her friend William Morris Meredith, Jr. told her she was "post-cocious."

== Honors ==
In 1971, L. Quincy Mumford, the librarian of Congress, named her consultant in poetry for 1971-1973 and as honorary consultant in American letters from 1973 to 1979.

Beginning in 1973, Jacobsen received multiple grants, prizes, and awards.

- MacDowell Colony grant (1973, 1974, 1976, 1981, 1983)
- Prairie Schooner Award for fiction (1974)
- Yaddo grant (1775, 1977, 1980, 1982, 1984)
- American Academy Fellowship (1987)
- Lenore Marshall Poetry Prize (1987)

Between 1978 and 1979, Jacobsen was Vice President of the Poetry Society of America. From 1979 to 1983, she was a member of both the literature panel for the National Endowment for the Arts and of the poetry committee of the Folger Library. In 1984, Jacobsen was lecturer for the American Writers Program annual meeting in Savannah, GA.

In 1993, Jacobsen received the Shelley Memorial Award from the Poetry Society of America. In 1994 she was inducted into the American Academy of Arts and Letters.

In 1997, Jacobsen was awarded the Poets' Prize for her In the Crevice of Time: New and Collected Poems (1995). That same year, she received the Poetry Society of America's highest award, the Robert Frost Medal for Lifetime Achievement in Poetry. In part, "the medal honored her legendary generosity in helping younger, struggling poets get their work published, a quality considered rare in her profession."

Jacobsen received honorary Doctorates of Humane Letters from Goucher College, Notre Dame of Maryland University, Towson University, and Johns Hopkins University.

Recognition
Joseph Brodsky praised Jacobsen's poetry for its "reserve, stoic timbre, and its high precision". She was known for "elegant, concise phrasing on a wide range of topics and in varied forms" in which she "plumbed questions of identity, interrelatedness and isolation".

Julie Miller commented that Jacobsen's poetry "rejoices in words for their own sake, not for the sake of the objects or ideas to which they refer. Words themselves become metaphors for the inexplicable tangle of body and spirit'. . . . Through words we are identified. They allow us to recognize and name the human experience."

William Jay Smith of The New York Times Book Review praised Jacobsen's "observant eye and varied interest" and her "broad range of skillfully handled stanza forms."

Joyce Carol Oates also of The New York Times Book Review compared Jacobsen with John Crowe Ransom, Emily Dickinson, and Elizabeth Bishop, all of whose poetry is "fastidiously imagined, brilliantly pared back, miniature narrative that always yields up a small shock of wonder."

A Washington Post Book World review of her short stories wrote that Jacobsen is certain of "what is and is not important, and why. These stories, consequently, have a bracing rigor about them, a keen independence, and the clean ring of truth."

== Personal life ==
Jacobsen married Eric Jacobsen, a tea importer, in 1932, "remaining happily with her husband" for 63 years until his death in 1995.

Jacobsen's husband Eric died suddenly in December 1995. They had been living in an apartment at Broadmead, a Retirement community in Cockeysville, Maryland, outside Baltimore. After her husband's death and after several falls, Josephine moved from their apartment to assisted living at Broadmead.

Jacobsen died on July 9, 2003, at Broadmead. She was 94.

A memorial Mass was offered for Jacobsen on September 4, 2003, at the Marikle Chapel of the Annunciation at the College of Notre Dame of Maryland.
