= The Diaspora Sonnets =

2023 poetry collection by Oliver de la Paz

- Author: Oliver de la Paz
- Publisher: Liveright
- Publication date: July 18, 2023
- Pages: 112
- Awards: New England Book Award for Poetry
- ISBN: 978-1324092988
- Preceded by: The Boy in the Labyrinth

The Diaspora Sonnets is a 2023 poetry collection by Oliver de la Paz, published by Liveright. It was longlisted for the 2023 National Book Award for Poetry and won the New England Book Award for Poetry.

== Contents and background ==
De la Paz grew up in a Filipino American family in Eastern Oregon. His family had moved there following the Vietnam War; they resettled "between the Umatilla Army Depot and the Mountain Home Airforce Base", where de la Paz's mother worked as a pediatrician. There, de la Paz stated, there was no Filipino American community, and he stopped speaking Tagalog. As a response to boredom, de la Paz approached literature.

De la Paz stated in International Examiner that his poetry "arises from attempts to explain myself and my family to others, and in my failure to make initial sense of these attempts. I’d have to create metaphor so that people would understand my point of view. Essentially use of poetic expression developed as a survival mechanism for my immigrant family." Accordingly, The Diaspora Sonnets, in three sections, enlists the sonnet form but also questions de la Paz's allegiance to formalism; he intended to pose the question of "In the case of the sonnet, what does it mean when a Filipino American writes in a Western European form?"

In November 2022, the poem "Diaspora Sonnet Traveling Between Apartment Rentals" was selected by Victoria Chang for The New York Times. Chang said that "These sonnets don’t have all the elements of typical sonnets, such as rhyme and meter, but they have the usual 14 lines and a volta, or turn, in the penultimate stanza ... The final volta tightly encapsulates the immigrant experience — that of new grammar and new lands that are both alluring and tenuous."

== Critical reception ==
Electric Literature called the book one of the best poetry collections in 2023. LitHub recommended the book in a list of forthcoming poetry collections for July 2024, stating "One of Oliver de la Paz’s gifts is his sense of the book as a whole ... Amidst poems rich in details of the resulting changing natural landscapes emerge vivid portraits: we see the father in his twenties holding a hatbox, later, a gun."

Some critics observed de la Paz's technique in relation to his professed themes of diaspora. The Poetry Foundation said "De la Paz creates loops of words, actions, and images within the patterned design of poetic form, rhyme scheme, anaphoric titling, and poem ordering ... The book’s repeating motifs, the pantoum’s repeating lines, the chain migration poem’s rhyme scheme, and the sonnet’s metrical rhythms work on literary traditions to mediate readers’ relationships to diasporic dislocation and trauma."
