= Stay Dead =

2025 poetry collection by Natalie Shapero

- Author: Natalie Shepero
- Publisher: Copper Canyon Press
- Publication date: September 9, 2025
- Pages: 94
- ISBN: 978-1556597121

Stay Dead is a 2025 poetry collection by Natalie Shapero published by Copper Canyon Press. It was longlisted for the National Book Award for Poetry and the National Book Critics Circle Award for Poetry.

== Critical reception ==
Time named Stay Dead one of the 100 must-read books of 2025.

Los Angeles Review of Books pointed out that "Shapero's strength comes through her thinking on the page. Without being rote, she is careful to develop the thread of an idea from each sentence to the next" and observed her unflinching discourses around life and death.

London Review of Books said that "Shapero has the best line breaks in the business right now" and commended her technique and wit: "These poems feel chatty, associative, almost tossed off despite their sonic tightness, carefully arranged to sound improvised. Shapero aspires to replace the obvious architectonics of other poetry with her own appalled, off-the-cuff humour, the tapestry of everyday experience with a series of sharp blades."
