= Mother (poetry collection) =

2024 debut poetry collection by m.s. RedCherries

mother
- Author: m.s. RedCherries
- Publisher: Penguin Books
- Publication date: July 16, 2024
- Pages: 144
- ISBN: 978-0143137832

Mother (stylized as mother) is a 2024 debut poetry collection by m.s. RedCherries, published by Penguin Books for its Penguin Poets series. The book was a finalist for the 2024 National Book Award for Poetry.

== Content ==
The book's poems follow an indigenous child, who is adopted and subsequently raised by a non-indigenous family outside of her tribe, as she traces her genealogy back to her tribe and its reservation. Told through various formats, including poetry, prose, and other forms, the book's themes concern indigeneity, colonialism, family, and others.

== Critical reception ==
Publishers Weekly stated that "The collection celebrates this mother, who was the speaker’s connection to the Cheyenne world and was taken from her at a young age. The result is a confident and arresting account of loss and the search to rebuild community and identity." The publication also included the book in a list of new books by indigenous authors in February of 2024.

LitHub called the book an "innovative" poetry collection and recommended it in a new books list in July of 2024; Xochitl Gonzalez called it a "testimony of empowerment in lush language that feels gorgeous and fresh." The Southern Review of Books, calling it a "groundbreaking collection in the ever-evolving and increasingly visible realm of Indigenous literature", stated the book "mother arrives at a pivotal, critical time in American current events, especially as states like Oklahoma reexamine their violent and complex relationships with Indigenous peoples."
