= Annelyse Gelman =

American poet

Annelyse Gelman is an American poet. Her second poetry collection, Vexations, won the 2022 James Laughlin Award and has been longlisted for the 2023 National Book Award for Poetry.

== Education ==
Gelman studied psychology during her undergraduate degree. In 2020, she received a Master of Fine Arts from the Michener Center for Writers at the University of Texas at Austin.

== Career ==
In addition to writing, Gelman founded and directs Midst, "a digital publishing platform focused on capturing, sharing, and exploring the drafting and editing processes of contemporary poets." She also teaches writing with the Fir Acres Writing Workshop at Lewis & Clark College.

== Awards and honors ==
In 2016, Gelman studied in Berlin as part of a Fulbright Program grant.

Vexations won the 2022 James Laughlin Award and has been longlisted for the 2023 National Book Award for Poetry.

== Bibliography ==
=== Poetry ===
Collections and chapbooks

- Everyone I Love is a Stranger to Someone. Write Bloody Publishing. 2014.
- POOL. Neck Press. 2020.
- Vexations. University of Chicago Press. 2023.
