= Oculus (poetry collection) =

2019 poetry collection by Sally Wen Mao

- Author: Sally Wen Mao
- Publisher: Graywolf Press
- Publication date: January 15, 2019
- Pages: 96
- ISBN: 978-1555978259
- Preceded by: Mad Honey Symposium
- Followed by: The Kingdom of Surfaces

Oculus is a 2019 poetry collection by Sally Wen Mao, published by Graywolf Press. Mao's second poetry collection, it was a finalist for the Los Angeles Times Book Prize for Poetry.

== Contents ==
The book's poems include themes of observation, performance, technology, persona, and media forms. The first poem named "Oculus", after the book's title, concerns a 2014 incident in which a suicide in Shanghai was virally documented on an Instagram account, which Mao herself saw while scrolling on the social media platform. The second poem named "Oculus" is set during Solange Knowles' performance at the Solomon R. Guggenheim Museum.

The book also makes references to other works of media. Twelve poems are centered around a speculative reinterpretation of Anna May Wong, who is considered to be the first Chinese American film star, such as "Anna May Wong on Silent Films" and "Anna May Wong Goes Viral". "Anna May Wong Blows Out Sixteen Candles" is based on Sixteen Candles by John Hughes, and "Anna May Wong Dreams of Wong Kar-Wai" draws upon Chungking Express. "Ghost in the Shell" makes indirect reference to the cyberpunk world-building of Ghost in the Shell and names Scarlett Johansson, who once faced controversy for a role she took in a western adaptation of the series. "The Diary of Afong Moy" interrogates the life of Afong Moy as one of spectacle and performance for the western gaze.

In a conversation with Jenny Xie for The Margins, Mao noted the difficulty of writing from the perspectives of others: "Using the first person to take on the voice of a historical figure or anyone else beyond the immediate self is audacious, and it carries responsibility." She then discussed the carefulness with which she exercised when choosing between first, second, and third person perspectives for her poems.

In an interview for the Center for Asian American Media, Mao shared that she had watched several films to research for the book, including The Toll of the Sea, Shanghai Express, Limehouse Blues, and others. Once, during an event at the International Hotel for Asian American and Pacific Islander Heritage Month while she was on her book tour for Oculus, Mao dressed up as Anime Wong, Mao's alter ego. She also edited a video from several Asian American women in poetry who discussed their own possible alter egos.

== Critical reception ==
Library Journal and Bookmarks included the book on their respective lists of best poetry for 2019. Time called it a must-read for 2019. NPR included it for their Books We Love section in 2019.

The New Yorker lauded Mao's speculative take on Wong's career as a "wild creation". The Georgia Review said "these poems interrogate the relationship between technology and the body and confront the symbolic violence of the camera’s gaze ... With sharp wit and linguistic brio, these poems reanimate and revitalize historical and fictional characters—primarily women of color—whose stories have long been silenced. Mao’s re-imagining of the marginalized is an act of deep empathy and care." The Los Angeles Review of Books concluded that "Mao’s poems in Oculus ask what technologies already shape our vision of the world and how they might be disassembled in order for new lives to be forged from their parts."

Of the book, Diode Poetry Journal wrote: "Here, we don’t see a dystopic vision of the future; we have a dystopic vision of the present, one in which we are at risk of seeing but not witnessing the horrors of racism, capitalism, and other institutional disenfranchisement because our realities are mediated by technology." Columbia Journal called it a "stunning second collection". Rain Taxi said "Mao’s collection is a sensorial and emotional overload that will disturb the reader in provocative ways." Pleiades observed that "In Mao’s poetry, no single line or word is out of place. Every placement is purposeful." Hyperallergic said "It is to Mao’s credit that she never seeks refuge in the single identity, no matter what comfort it promises, because she knows it limits her in ways that she finds unacceptable." The Bind wrote: "In addition to its critical visions, much of the heart of this collection lies ... in the possibility that women of color can defy time and script to write to and for each other."

In November of 2018, The Rumpus picked the book for its Poetry Book Club.
