= Isabella Gardner (poet) =

American poet (1915-1981)

- Born: September 7, 1915; Newton, Massachusetts, U.S.
- Died: July 7, 1981 (aged 65); Manhattan, New York, U.S.
- Occupations: Poet, actress
- Spouse: Allen Tate
- Relatives: Isabella Stewart Gardner (aunt); Robert Lowell (cousin)

Isabella Gardner (September 7, 1915 – July 7, 1981) was an American poet and actress. She worked as an associate editor for Poetry from 1951 through 1955 alongside Ken Shapiro. She is the namesake of the Isabella Gardner Poetry Award.

== Early life and education ==
Gardner was born in Newton, Massachusetts on September 7, 1915. She was raised in Boston and had 5 brothers and sisters. Gardner was named for her great-aunt Isabella Stewart Gardner, an art collector and philanthropist. She was also the cousin of the poet Robert Lowell.

In 1931, Gardner attended the Foxcroft School in Virginia. Originally interested in theater, Gardner studied at the Leighton Rollins School of Acting and in 1937, enrolled in the Embassy School of Acting in London.

== Career ==
Gardner started her career in theater, acting in both New York and Boston. She was later encouraged by the poet Oscar Williams to focus on her own poetry, eventually having poems published in Poetry. In 1951, Gardner started as an associate editor at Poetry, working under the poet Karl Shapiro. In this role, Gardner was responsible for reviewing submissions for publication, passing them up to Shapiro for final selection. Shapiro helped introduce Gardner to a larger audience, including the poet Edith Sitwell, who described Gardner as "a most talented young woman poet".

Gardner published her first collection of poems, Birthdays from the Ocean, in 1955. The book was a critical success and a runner-up for the National Book Award for Poetry. In 1954, Gardner became a sponsor for the poet Gregory Corso and briefly provided him with financial support. In her role as associate editor, she liked his poems but was unable to get them published in Poetry under Shapiro.

Gardner married poet Allen Tate in August 1959. Unlike Corso, Tate was described as "viscerally anti-Beat" by Marian Janssen in her biography of Isabella Gardner. Tate later left her for one of his younger students, and Gardner went to live in the Hotel Chelsea. Gardner and Tate divorced in 1966.

In 1961, she published The Looking Glass, which was also a finalist for the National Book Award. In 1980, she published her final book, That Was Then: New and Selected Poems, which was described as offering "a lifetime of experience--whole but maturing". That Was Then was nominated for an American Book Award.

== Death and legacy ==
Gardner died in Manhattan on July 7, 1981.

Janssen described Gardner's poetry as traditional, saying she was a "master of poetic forms from villanelle to triolet".

In 1982, she was posthumously awarded the Walt Whitman Citation of Merit for poetry.

Publishing house BOA Editions presents the Isabella Gardner Poetry Award, a biennial award for "mid-career poet[s] of exceptional merit".

== Works ==
- Birthdays from the Ocean (1955)
- The Looking Glass (1961)
- West of Childhood (1965)
- That Was Then: New and Selected Poems (1980)
