= Fargo Tbakhi =

Palestinian American writer and performance artist

- Born: 1997 (age 28–29); Riverside, California, U.S.
- Education: Arizona State University
- Occupations: Writer; poet; performance artist
- Writing career
- Genres: Poetry; short fiction; essay
- Notable work: TERROR COUNTER
- Notable awards: National Book Award for Poetry longlist (2025)

Fargo Tbakhi (born 1997) is a Palestinian American writer, poet, and performance artist. His debut poetry collection, TERROR COUNTER (2025), was longlisted for the National Book Award for Poetry.

== Career and reception ==
Tbakhi moved to Phoenix, Arizona, when he was 12, and later studied theater at Arizona State University. His one-person show My Father, My Martyr, and Me grew out of his thesis project and was profiled by ASU News in 2020. The performance was later staged at the Capital Fringe Festival in 2022 and at Rhizome DC in 2023.

His short fiction has appeared in Strange Horizons and Apex Magazine, and his essays and criticism have appeared in the Los Angeles Review of Books and Protean. He is a recipient of the Ghassan Kanafani Resistance Arts Prize.

Deep Vellum published Tbakhi's debut poetry collection, TERROR COUNTER, in 2025. The book was longlisted for the 2025 National Book Award for Poetry. In its summer 2025 books preview, Vulture highlighted the collection's formal experimentation, including the "Gazan tunnel", and described the poems as seeking a lyric mode beyond reductive political narratives while holding together survival, care, and collective liberation.

Tbakhi's short story "Root Rot" has received critical attention. It was included in The Best American Science Fiction and Fantasy 2022, edited by Rebecca Roanhorse with series editor John Joseph Adams, and a Strange Horizons review of the anthology called it "the single best piece on offer".

== Works ==
=== Poetry collections ===
- TERROR COUNTER (Deep Vellum, 2025)
- ANTIGONE. VELOCITY. SALT. (Deep Vellum, forthcoming 2027)

=== Selected short fiction and essays ===
- "12 Worlds Interrupted by the Drone" (Strange Horizons, 2020)
- "Root Rot" (Apex Magazine, 2021)
- Dispatches from an Unoccupied Future: Reflections on the Palestine Writes Festival (Los Angeles Review of Books, 2021)
- "Notes on Craft: Writing in the Hour of Genocide" (Protean, 2023)
