= M.s. RedCherries =

Native American poet

m.s. RedCherries
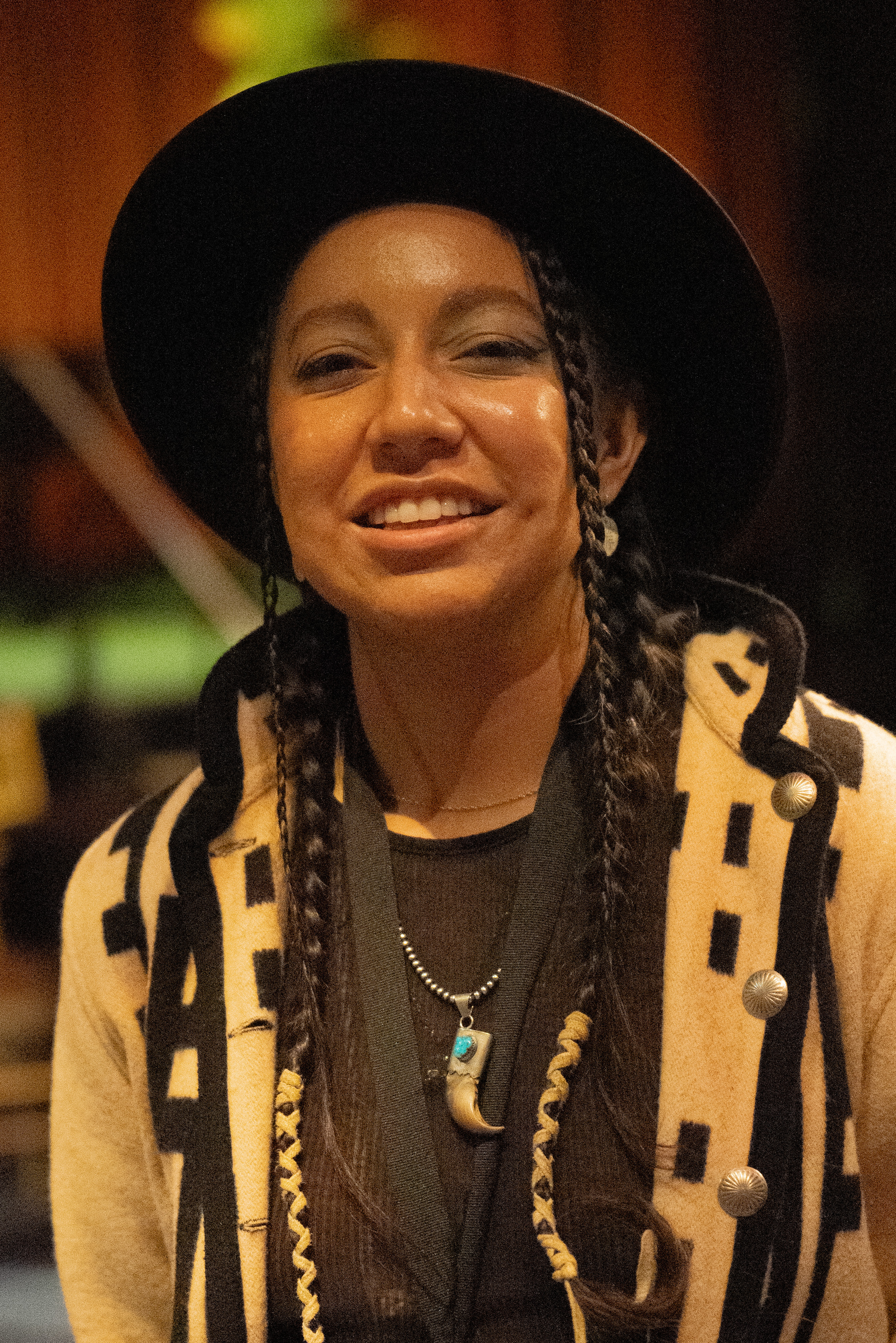
- RedCherries in 2024
- Education: Arizona State University (JD); University of Iowa (MFA)
- Notable work: mother
- Website: www.msredcherries.com

m.s. RedCherries is a writer from the Northern Cheyenne Nation. Her debut poetry collection, mother, was a finalist for the National Book Award for Poetry in 2024.

== Early life and education ==
RedCherries is a citizen of the Northern Cheyenne Nation. In an interview with Chapter House, the magazine of the Institute of American Indian Arts, RedCherries stated that she grew up with her birth parents but was later adopted by a family in Texas, a decision made "because of my mother’s love to want a better life for me."

Growing up, RedCherries often expressed herself through writing even before she formally considered herself to be a writer. Later in life, RedCherries graduated from Arizona State University with a Juris Doctor degree. There, she had taken a creative writing course in her very last semester of law school called "Creative Writing in the Law" taught by writer Gary Stuart; the class was interested in how to make briefs more narratively legible and interesting.

Deciding to continue with her writing practice, RedCherries subsequently attended the Iowa Writers' Workshop and graduated with an MFA in 2021. There, she began working on the pieces for her debut poetry collection, mother, which later became her thesis; Lan Samantha Chang would serve as her thesis advisor. By her final semester, RedCherries found a sense of organization for the poems she wrote.

== Career ==
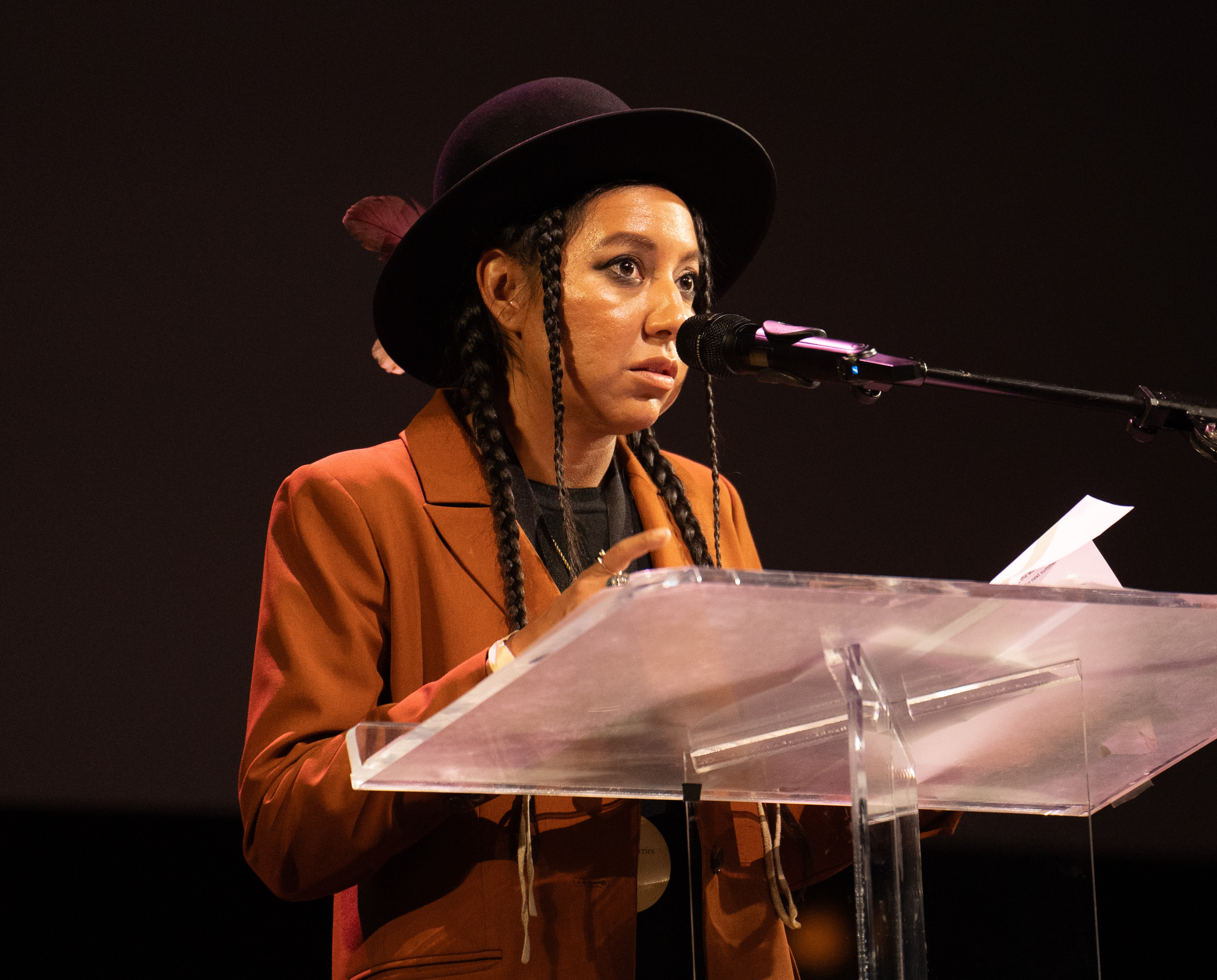
RedCherries reading at the 2024 National Book Awards finalist reading in the Skirball Center for the Performing Arts

RedCherries' debut poetry collection, mother, was published by Penguin Books for its Penguin Poets series in 2024 and subsequently designated a finalist for the National Book Award for Poetry. The book, somewhat based on RedCherries' own experiences, follows an indigenous child adopted and raised by a non-indigenous family outside of her reservation. After its publication, the book was well-reviewed by several outlets including Publishers Weekly, which stated that it was "a confident and arresting account of loss and the search to rebuild community and identity" and recommended it in a list of books by Indigenous authors. RedCherries' debut was also featured in LitHub and Electric Literature.
