= Vexations (poetry collection) =

2023 poetry collection by Annelyse Gelman

- Author: Annelyse Gelman
- Publisher: University of Chicago Press
- Publication date: March 31, 2023
- Pages: 54
- ISBN: 978-0226826110
- Preceded by: Pool

Vexations is a 2023 poetry collection by Annelyse Gelman. It was published by University of Chicago Press for its Phoenix Poets series after Gelman's manuscript won the 2022 James Laughlin Award. A singular poem the length of a book, Vexations was longlisted for the 2023 National Book Award for Poetry.

== Content ==
The book is a single poem, following a pregnant speaker as she traverses the destruction of the world—a time described as "the year the hurricanes began" amid other disasters, including human-induced turmoil. In such a setting, the poem addresses issues like climate change, gun violence, reproductive rights, and others.

== Background ==
The book is titled and structured after the Erik Satie composition of the same name which bore an inscription to perform its motif 840 times. Gelman, at age 16, had seen a 24-hour performance of the Satie piece at the California Institute of the Arts which later propelled her to write the book:

"I had a sleeping bag and lay on the floor, listening and not listening, eventually entering into this psychedelic mental space brought about by the tension between repetition and variation, boredom and surprise."

Other influences for the book were pieces of "durational art" along the likes of James Turrell, Walter De Maria's The Lightning Field, and drone music. Gelman also cited her studies in psychology as a student at Reed College and her participation in slam poetry at University of California, Berkeley as important to her realization of the poem. She said in The Adroit Journal that she had wanted to create an "ambient poem" or "something modular and rearrangeable, that would go on and on and never repeat the same sequences."

== Critical reception ==
Critics observed the apocalyptic, violent setting of Gelman's poem. The Poetry Foundation called the book a "dystopic poem" and said "Rather than repeating text in full, Gelman's Vexations moves in organized disjunction through a winding narrative that insists and compels." The Los Angeles Review of Books compared the book to Cormac McCarthy's The Road and stated "The skeletal plot, polyvocal at times, proceeds not by logic but through the dislocations we all feel in a time of sociopolitical turmoil, and it is Gelman's surreal touches and command of a highly nuanced language that propel us". 4Columns wrote that "Rarely punctuated, [Gelman's] oracular lines make meaning in their steady, glittery, toxic accumulation. She delineates a dying Earth—as dry report, as creamy choral litany—while a daughter grows up and futures close down." The New York Review of Books said "The poem makes a sound as terrifying as it is familiar: the nervous patter of a world at the end of its days."
