= Bull City Press =

American independent small press publisher

- Status: Active
- Founded: 2006
- Founder: Ross White, Bill Ferris, Jeremy Griffin
- Country of origin: United States
- Headquarters location: Durham, North Carolina
- Publication types: Chapbooks, poetry, fiction, creative nonfiction, literary journal (Inch)
- Official website: bullcitypress.com

Bull City Press is an American independent small press publisher headquartered in Durham, North Carolina. Founded in 2006, the press specializes in chapbooks and compact collections of poetry, fiction, and creative nonfiction, as well as the quarterly pocket-sized literary journal Inch and literary events.

== History ==
Bull City Press was established in 2006 by writers Ross White, Bill Ferris, and Jeremy Griffin in Durham, North Carolina (colloquially known as the "Bull City"). The press began as a publisher of a literary journal devoted to concise verse and micro-fiction, Inch, before adding chapbooks to their publishing program.

In 2015, Bull City Press acquired several titles from Origami Zoo Press, expanding its catalog to include fiction and creative nonfiction chapbooks. Bull City Press operates as a volunteer-run independent publisher, with staff members receiving no salary so that proceeds directly fund production costs and author royalties. The press makes select titles available on a "pay what you want" basis. Formerly distributed by Small Press Distribution (SPD) prior to SPD's abrupt closure in 2024, the press later shifted distribution to Independent Publishers Group (IPG).

== Publications and programs ==
=== Inch magazine ===
The press publishes Inch, a quarterly print journal measuring 4.25 by 5.5 inches. Originally styled as a literary journal, each issue now features a micro-chapbook by a single author.

=== Book series and contests ===
- The Frost Place Chapbook Competition: From 2013 to 2022, Bull City Press partnered with The Frost Place (the former home of Robert Frost) to publish the annual winner of its chapbook fellowship.
- Acquisitions and imprints: The press has occasionally acquired backlists and titles from defunct small presses, including selections from Origami Zoo Press, Backbone Press, and Southeast Missouri State University Press.

== Notable authors ==
Writers who have had collections or chapbooks published by Bull City Press include:

- Tommye Blount
- Anders Carlson-Wee
- K-Ming Chang
- Leila Chatti
- Armen Davoudian
- B.J. Hollars
- Michael McFee
- Michael Martone
- Jill Osier
- Michael Parker
- Emilia Phillips
- Laura van den Berg
- Daniel Wallace
