= Cathy Linh Che =

American poet

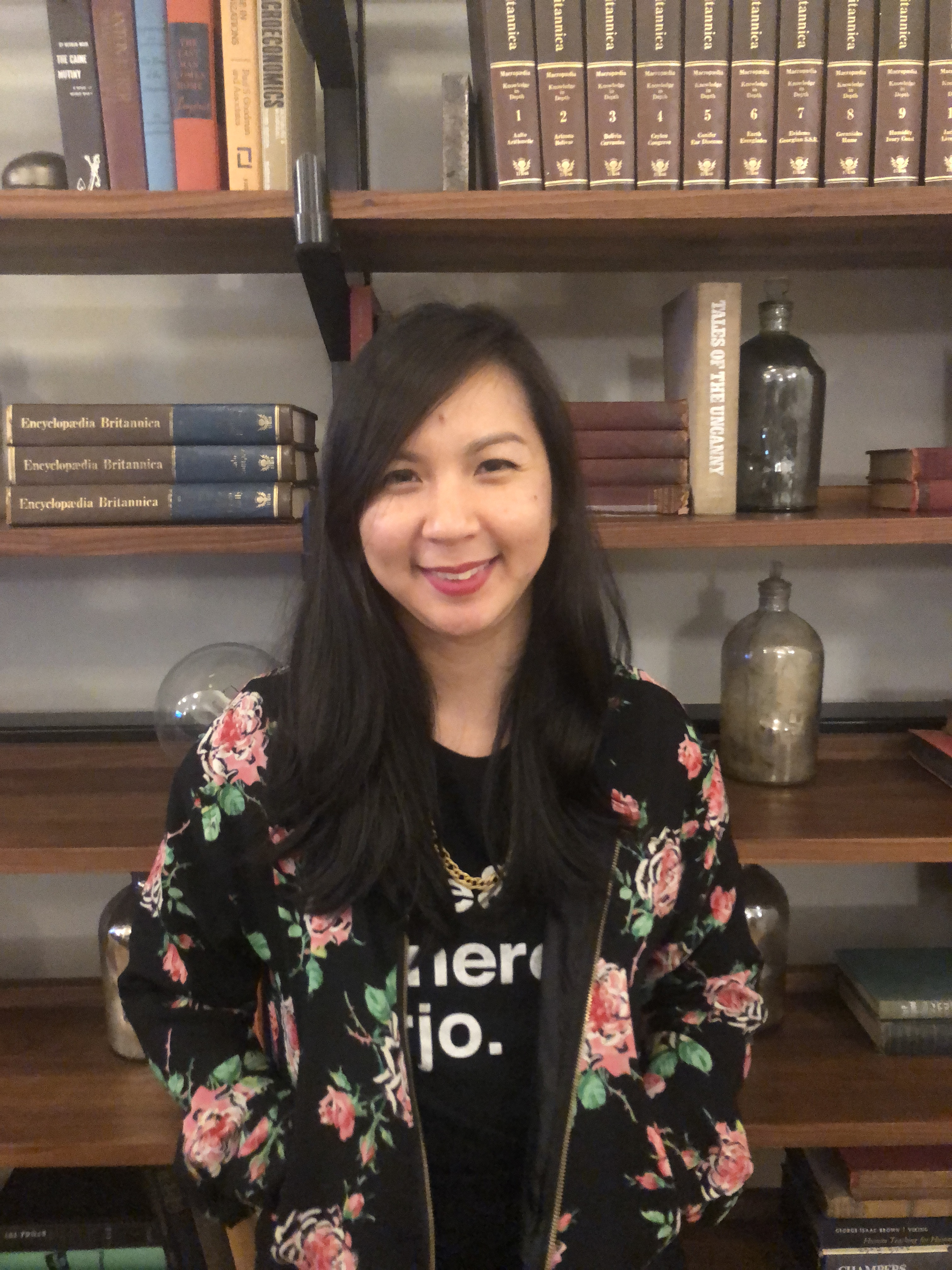
- Che at The Ace Hotel, May 2019
- Education: New York University
- Writing career
- Genre: Poetry
- Notable awards: Kundiman Poetry Prize; National Book Award for Poetry finalist (2025)

Cathy Linh Che is a Vietnamese American poet from Los Angeles. She won the Kundiman Poetry Prize, the Norma Farber First Book Award from the Poetry Society of America, and the Best Poetry Book Award from the Association for Asian American Studies for her book Split. Che's poetry collection Becoming Ghost (Washington Square Press, 2025) was a finalist for the National Book Award for Poetry.

== Life ==
Cathy Linh Che attended Reed College and New York University where she received her Bachelor of Arts and Master of Fine Arts degrees. In an interview done by Emerson College, Che states, "I was raised in Highland Park in a working class Asian and Latinx immigrant community. So, while there were plenty of clashes between my parents and me, it was something that everyone around me experienced so I never felt different or alone until going away to college."

In 2018, she helped organize the Kundiman "Because We Come From Everything" project. She participated in the digital project the "Poetics of Haunting," curated by Jane Wong.

== Writing career ==
When asked in an interview at Emerson College of what brought Cathy Linh Che to poetry, Che responded saying: "I would have to say that my parents brought me to poetry. Though neither one is a poet, my upbringing was filled with their stories. While sitting at the dinner table, my parents would tell me about their lives during the Vietnam War, the year in a refugee camp, their first years in the U.S. When I began writing, their voices demanded to be told. I couldn't help but see their stories as fundamentally part of my own."

Che is currently the executive director at Kundiman.

Che's most recognized work comes from a book called Split, "which contains poems on the psychological, sexual, and abusive effects of war."

== Awards ==
Throughout Cathy Linh Che's career, several awards have been pinned to her name, such as The Kundiman Poetry Prize, the Norma Farber First Book Award from the Poetry Society of America, and The Best Poetry Book Award from the Association of Asian American Studies.

- 2025 National Book Award for Poetry, finalist for Becoming Ghost.

== Works ==
- Split, Alice James Books, 2014.
- Hair : poems: a collection of cuts and ties, Reed College, 2002. OCLC 268892934
- Split, Chestertown, Maryland: Literary House Press, 2016. OCLC 993260020
- Becoming Ghost. Washington Square Press. April 29, 2025. ISBN 9781668088920.

Anthologies

- Laren McClung; Yusef Komunyakaa (eds) Inheriting the war : poetry and prose by descendants of Vietnam veterans and refugees, New York : W.W. Norton & Company, 2018. ISBN 9780393354287, OCLC 1009717493
