= The Kingdom of Surfaces =

2023 poetry collection by Sally Wen Mao

- Author: Sally Wen Mao
- Publisher: Graywolf Press
- Publication date: August 1, 2023
- Pages: 112
- ISBN: 978-1644452370
- Preceded by: Oculus

The Kingdom of Surfaces is a 2023 poetry collection by American poet Sally Wen Mao, published by Graywolf Press. Mao's third poetry collection, it was a finalist for the Maya Angelou Book Award.

== Content ==
Separated into four sections, the book's poems concern many themes including aesthetics, imperialism, the COVID-19 pandemic, and the American Dream.

In the Los Angeles Review of Books, Mao cited Anne Anlin Cheng's notion of ornamentalism as integral to her understanding of objects in the book, stating that beauty can be simultaneously critiqued and marveled at: "the objects themselves can be beautiful, but it’s the human practices surrounding them that may suggest exploitation as soon as you begin to unspool the history of that object."

Some poems invoke forms of craft, such as "On Silk" and sericulture, "On Porcelain" and ceramics, "Haibun: Kintsugi" and kintsugi, and others, which Mao had learned about through her artist friends and through galleries she visited. The poem with the same name as the book is set in the 2015 Met Gala which was themed "China: Through the Looking Glass" and retells the Lewis Carroll book with a similar name. Mao stated in Electric Literature that she had written it after visiting the Met exhibition herself and feeling that it was both "sublimely beautful" and "really disturbing". "American Loneliness" was written in early 2022 after Mao heard about various incidents of hate crimes against Asian Americans.

== Critical reception ==
Publishers Weekly wrote that Mao had a "tenacious imagination" and, with it, explored "the politics of beauty and the ironies inherent in culture and civilization under the sign of empire."

The Poetry Foundation lauded Mao's approach to "historical hurt" and her revisiting of topics from Oculus. Electric Literature said called it "a truly brilliant collection which takes us on a deep, fantastic journey and awakens a profound yearning to not only learn more about the ancient crafts she interweaves throughout, but to question all you’ve ever internalized or learned about Chinese culture, especially in these current times when the pandemic fueled life into a frenzy of violent anti-Asian hate throughout the country." The Columbia Journal of Literary Criticism called the book " an ambitious historical examination of the treatment of Asian people in the West, written in the wings of the Coronavirus pandemic." The Los Angeles Review of Books wrote that "The poems, sometimes in the shape of vessels curving down the page, take the history of art and make it strange, rendering new the craft of protest". The New York Journal of Books said the book was "mesmerizing, gorgeous for its attention to language and image, and equally horrifying for what it holds before our gaze and how it challenges that gaze."

Electric Literature included the book in their top 4 poetry collections for 2023. NPR included it in a list of "poetry collections taking the pulse of the times". Book Riot named it in a list of summer poetry.
