= Tommye Blount =

American poet

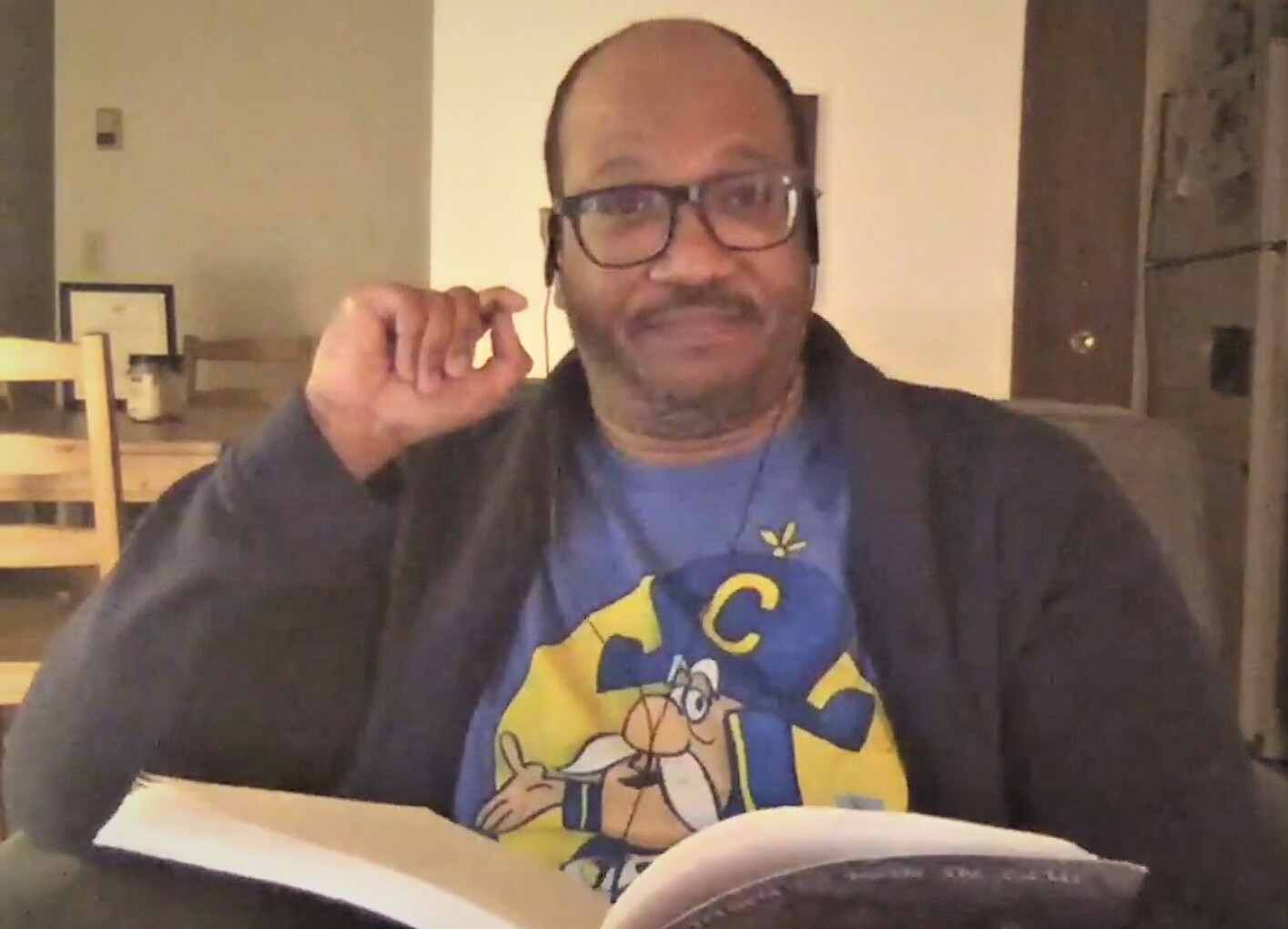
- Blount reads Fantasia for the Man in Blue for the National Book Foundation in 2020
- Born: Detroit, Michigan, United States
- Education: Michigan State University (B.A.); Warren Wilson College (M.F.A.)
- Writing career
- Genre: Poetry

Tommye Blount is a Black, queer poet from Detroit, Michigan. He is the author of the poetry collection Fantasia for the Man in Blue and the chapbook What Are We Not For. Fantasia for the Man in Blue was a finalist for the 2020 National Book Award for Poetry.

== Personal life ==
Blount was born in Detroit, Michigan. Blount attended Michigan State University for his undergraduate degree and earned an MFA from Warren Wilson College, graduating in 2013. He lives in Novi, Michigan.

== Career ==
Blount is the author of the book Fantasia for the Man in Blue which was a finalist for the 2020 National Book Award for Poetry. He is also the author of the chapbook What Are We Not For.

Blount is a Cave Canem Fellow, a 2017 Literary Arts Fellow at Kresge Arts in Detroit, and a fellow of Bread Loaf Writer's Conference

== Works ==
=== Poems ===
- "The Pedestrian" (Academy of American Poets)
- "The Bug" (Poetry, January 2015)
- "The Tongue" (Poetry, January 2015)

=== Chapbooks ===
- What Are We Not For (2016, Bull City Press) ISBN 978-1495157639

=== Books ===
- Fantasia for the Man in Blue (2020, Four Way Books) ISBN 978-1945588495

== Awards ==
- 2020 – National Book Award for Poetry, Finalist
