= Barbara Howes =

American writer

- Born: May 1, 1914; New York City, New York, U.S.
- Died: February 24, 1996 (aged 81); Bennington, Vermont, U.S.
- Education: Bennington College
- Writing career
- Genre: poetry

Barbara Howes (May 1, 1914 – February 24, 1996) was an American poet.

== Life ==
She was adopted and raised in Chestnut Hill, attending Beaver Country Day School. She graduated from Bennington College in 1937. She edited the literary magazine Chimera from 1943 to 1947 and lived in Greenwich Village. In 1947 she married the poet William Jay Smith and had two sons, David and Gregory. After divorcing in "the mid-1960s", she lived in Pownal, Vermont.

In 1971, she signed a letter protesting proposed cuts to the School of the Arts, Columbia University.

Her work was published in: Atlantic, Chicago Review, New Directions, New Republic, New Yorker, New York Times Book Review, Saturday Review, Southern Review, University of Kansas Review, Virginia Quarterly Review, and Yale Review.

== Awards ==
- Golden Rose Award
- nominated for the 1995 National Book Award for The Collected Poems of Barbara Howes, 1945-1990

== Works ==
- "The Nuns Assist at Childbirth". Poetry. February 1949.
- "A Few Days Ago". Poetry Foundation.
- "In the Cold Country". Poetry. February 1949.
- "Light and Dark". Poetry Foundation. 31 May 2022.
- "The Lonely Pipefish". Poetry Foundation. 31 May 2022.
- "The Nuns Assist at Childbirth". Poetry. February 1949.

=== Poetry ===
- The Undersea Farmer. Pawlet, VT: Banyan Press. 1948.
- In the Cold Country. New York City: Bonacio & Saul/Grove Press. 1954.
- Light and Dark. Middletown, CT: Wesleyan University Press. 1959. ISBN 978-0-8195-1001-3.
- Looking Up at Leaves. New York, NY: Knopf. 1966.
- The Blue Garden. Wesleyan University Press. 1972. ISBN 978-0-8195-2062-3.
- A Private Signal: Poems New and Selected. Wesleyan University Press. 1977. ISBN 978-0-8195-5013-2.
- Moving, Elysian Press (New York, NY), 1983.
- The Collected Poems of Barbara Howes, 1945-1990. Fayetteville: University of Arkansas Press. 1995. ISBN 978-1-55728-336-8.

=== Fiction ===
- 23 Modern Stories. Vintage. 1963.
- Gregory Jay Smith (1970). The Sea-Green Horse. Macmillan.

=== Editor ===
- From the Green Antilles: Writings of the Caribbean. New York, NY: Macmillan. 1966.
- The Eye of the Heart: Short Stories from Latin America. Indianapolis, Indiana: Bobbs-Merrill. 1973. ISBN 9780672516375.
- The Road Commissioner and Other Stories, illustrated by Gregory Smith, Stinehour Press, 1983.

=== Anthologies ===
- New Poems by American Poets, Ballantine (New York, NY), 1957
- Modern Verse in English, Macmillan, 1958
- Modern American Poetry, Harcourt (New York, NY), 1962
- Poet's Choice, Dial (New York, NY), 1962
- Modern Poets, McGraw (New York City), 1963
- Of Poetry and Power, Basic Books (New York City), 1964
- The Girl in the Black Raincoat, edited by George Garrett, Duell, Sloane & Pierce, 1966
- The Marvelous Light, edited by Helen Plotz, Crowell (New York, NY), 1970
- Inside Outer Space, edited by Robert Vas Dias, Anchor Books (New York, NY), 1970.

== Reviews ==
Reading the Collected Poems, one sees Howes very clearly as a woman writing in one of the oddest but most important traditions of American poetry. Howes stands with Marianne Moore, Elizabeth Bishop, and ultimately Emily Dickinson in a lineage of women writers passionately committed to the independence and singularity of the poetic imagination. (To this group one might also add Louise Bogan, Julia Randall, May Swenson, and Josephine Miles). They form an eccentric but eminent sorority.
