= Oliver de la Paz =

American poet and educator

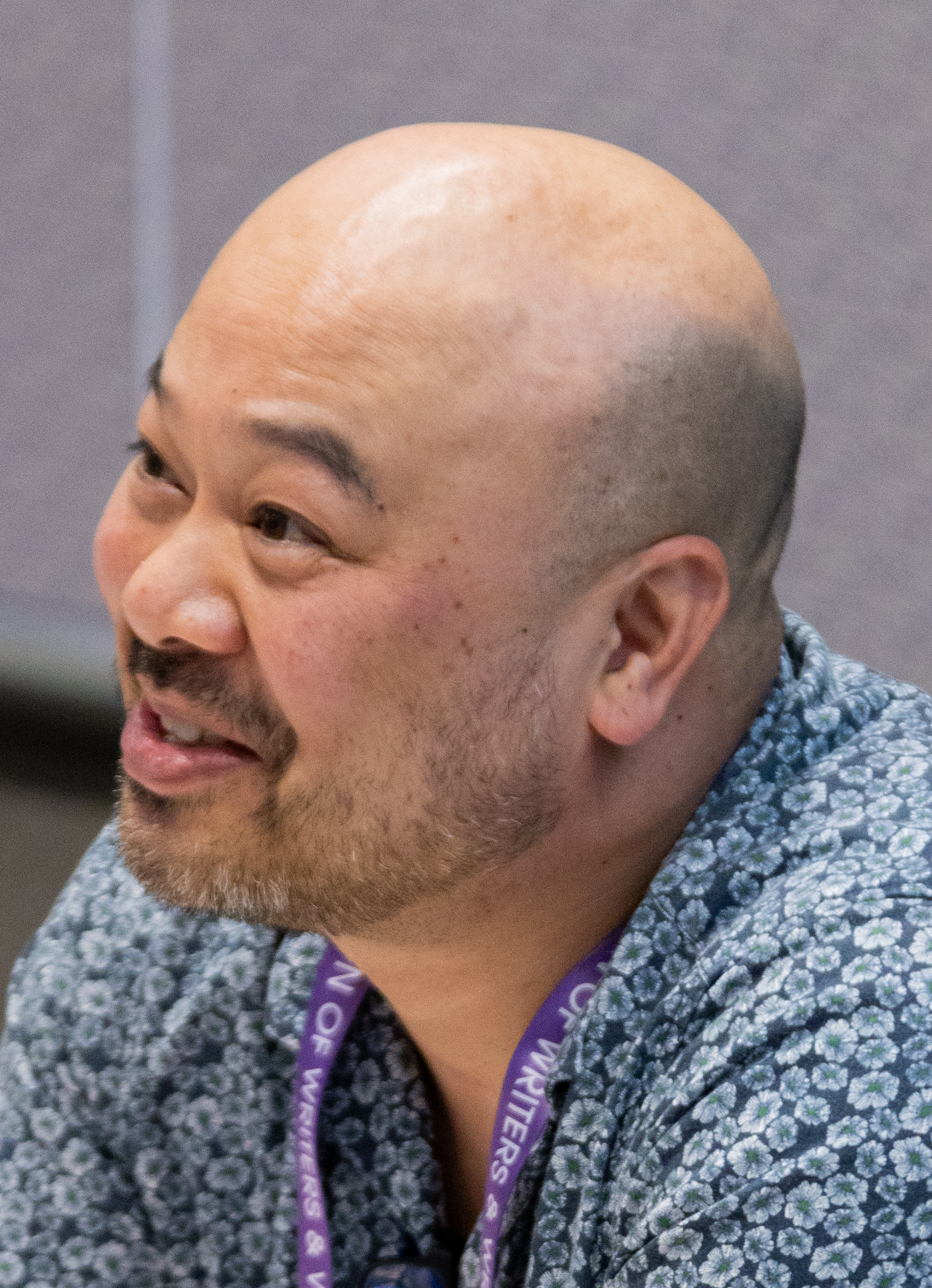
- de la Paz at AWP 2025
- Education: Loyola Marymount University (BA, BS); Arizona State University (MFA)

Oliver de la Paz is an American poet and educator. He is the author of five collections of poetry, including Requiem for the Orchard (University of Akron Press, 2010), winner of the Akron Prize for Poetry. His honors include a 2005 New York Foundation for the Arts Fellowship Award and a 2009 GAP Grant from Artist Trust. His work has appeared in literary journals and magazines including Virginia Quarterly Review, North American Review, Tin House, Chattahoochee Review, and in anthologies such as Asian American Poetry: The Next Generation (University of Illinois Press, 2004).

De la Paz was born in Manila, Philippines, and raised in Ontario, Oregon. He earned a B.S. in biology and a B.A. in English from Loyola Marymount University, and an M.F.A. in creative writing from Arizona State University. He teaches at College of the Holy Cross, and co-chairs the advisory board of Kundiman, a not-for-profit organization dedicated to the promotion of Asian American Poetry.

== Published works ==
- The Diaspora Sonnets (Liveright, 2023)
- The Boy in the Labyrinth (University of Akron Press, 2019)
- Requiem for the Orchard (University of Akron Press, 2010)
- Furious Lullaby (Southern Illinois University Press, 2007)
- Names Above Houses (Southern Illinois University Press, 2001)
