= Reginald Gibbons =

American poet (born 1947)

- Born: 1947 (age 78–79); Houston, Texas, U.S.
- Education: Princeton University (AB); Stanford University (MA, PhD)
- Occupations: Poet; writer; translator; literary critic
- Writing career
- Genre: Fiction
- Notable awards: Anisfield-Wolf Book Award (1995)
- Website: www.reginaldgibbons.northwestern.edu

Reginald Gibbons (born 1947) is an American poet, fiction writer, translator, and literary critic. He is the Frances Hooper Professor of Arts and Humanities, emeritus, at Northwestern University. Gibbons has published numerous books, including 11 volumes of poems, translations of poetry from ancient Greek, Spanish, and co-translations from Russian. He has published short stories, essays, reviews and art in journals and magazines, has held Guggenheim Foundation and NEA fellowships in poetry and a research fellowship from the Center for Hellenic Studies in Washington D.C. For his novel, Sweetbitter, he won the Anisfield-Wolf Book Award; for his book of poems, Maybe It Was So, he won the Carl Sandburg Prize. He has won the Folger Shakespeare Library's O. B. Hardison, Jr. Poetry Prize, and other honors, among them the inclusion of his work in Best American Poetry and Pushcart Prize anthologies. His book Creatures of a Day was a Finalist for the 2008 National Book Award for poetry. His other poetry books include Sparrow: New and Selected Poems (Balcones Prize), Last Lake and Renditions, his eleventh book of poems. Two books of poems are forthcoming: Three Poems in 2024 and Young Woman With a Cane in 2025. He has also published two collections of very short fiction, Five Pears or Peaches and An Orchard in the Street.

Gibbons was born in Houston, Texas, and first attended public school in Houston before entering the Spring Branch independent school district (at that time, outside Houston; now inside Houston's boundaries). He received an AB in Spanish and Portuguese from Princeton University, and an MA in English and creative writing and a PhD in comparative literature from Stanford University. Before moving to Northwestern University to direct TriQuarterly Magazine, he taught Spanish at Rutgers and creative writing at Princeton and Columbia University.

At Northwestern, he was the editor of TriQuarterly magazine from 1981 to 1997, and co-founded TriQuarterly Books (after 1997, an imprint of Northwestern University Press). As the editor of TriQuarterly, he edited or co-edited the special issues Chicago (1984), From South Africa: New Writing, Photography and Art (1987), A Window on Poland (1983), Prose from Spain (1983), The Writer in Our World (a symposium of writers including Derek Walcott, Grace Paley, Robert Stone, C. K. Williams, Gloria Emerson, Carolyn Forche, Michael S. Harper, Mary Lee Settle, Ward Just, and others) (1986), Thomas McGrath: Life and the Poem (1987), Writing and Well-Being (1989), New Writing from Mexico (1992), and others, as well as many general issues of the magazine.

As the executor of the literary estate of William Goyen (1915–1983), Gibbons edited four works of Goyen: a posthumous volume of short stories, Had I a Hundred Mouths: New & Selected Stories 1947-1983 (Clarkson Potter, 1985; Persea Books, 1986); Goyen's posthumously published second novel, Half a Look of Cain (Northwestern University Press, 1998); a 50th-Anniversary restored edition of The House of Breath (Northwestern University Press, 2000); and a collection of nonfiction prose, Goyen: Autobiographical Essays, Notebooks, Evocations, Interviews (University of Texas Press / Harry Ransom Humanities Research Center Imprint Series, 2007).

In 1989, Gibbons was one of a group of co-founders of the Guild Literary Complex (Chicago), a literary presenting organization (as of 2019 he is an emeritus board member). He was also a member of the Content Leadership Team that helped create the American Writers Museum (Chicago), and he remains on the national advisory board of the museum. With colleagues in the Guild Literary Complex, he also founded BrooksDay, an annual public reading in Chicago of the poetry of Gwendolyn Brooks.

At Northwestern University, he was director of the Center for the Writing Arts; a faculty member of the Department of English (which he chaired in 2002–2005); a faculty member of the Dept. of Classics; a former member of the Department of Spanish and Portuguese; the founder of the part-time MFA in Creative Writing within the School of Professional Studies at Northwestern University; a former director of graduate studies of the full-time Litowitz Graduate Creative Writing Program (MFA+MA); and a member of the Core Faculty of the Program in Comparative Literary Studies.

== Career ==
- Frances Hooper Professor of Arts and Humanities, emeritus Northwestern University
- Formerly lecturer in Spanish, Livingston College, Rutgers University, 1975–76; lecturer in creative writing, Princeton University, 1976–1980; lecturer in creative writing, Columbia University School of General Studies, 1980–81; lecturer then professor of English, Northwestern University, 1981-
- Editor of TriQuarterly magazine, 1981–1997
- Core faculty member of MFA Program for Writers, Warren Wilson College (Asheville, North Carolina), 1989–2011
- Co-founder and member of the board of directors, Guild Complex, 1989–2019
- Member, National Advisory Council and Content Leadership Team, American Writers Museum, 2012–

== Poetry ==
- Roofs Voices Roads (Quarterly Review of Literature, 1979).
- The Ruined Motel (Houghton Mifflin, 1981).
- Saints (Persea Books, 1986).
- Maybe It Was So (University of Chicago Press, 1991). ISBN 978-0-226-29056-0.
- Sparrow: New and Selected Poems (LSU Press, 1997). ISBN 978-0-8071-2232-7.
- Homage to Longshot O'Leary: Poems (Holy Cow! Press, 1999).
- It's Time: Poems (LSU Press, 2002) ISBN 978-0-8071-2815-2.
- Creatures of a Day: Poems (LSU Press, 2008) ISBN 978-0-8071-3318-7.
- Desde una barca de papel (Poemas 1981-2008) (Littera Libros (Villanueva de la Serena, SPAIN), 2009, bilingual edition, English and Spanish).
- Slow Trains Overhead: Chicago Poems and Stories (University of Chicago Press, 2010) ISBN 978-0-226-29058-4.
- L'abitino blue (Gattomerlino (Rome, ITALY, 2012, bilingual edition, English and Italian).
- Last Lake (University of Chicago Press, 2016 ISBN 978-0-226-41745-5.
- Renditions (Four Way Books, 2021).

== Fiction ==
- Sweetbitter: A Novel a fourth reprint in paperback in 2023 by JackLeg Press (after previous editions by Broken Moon Press, Penguin Books, LSU University Press).
- Five Pears or Peaches. (Broken Moon Press, 1991).
- An Orchard in the Street. (BOA Editions, Ltd, 2017).

== Other books ==
(Incomplete - to be updated)

- Sophocles, Selected Poems: Odes and Fragments (Princeton University Press, 2008.) Translated and Introduced by Reginald Gibbons. ISBN 978-0-691-13024-8
- How Poems Think (University of Chicago Press, 2015). ISBN 978-0-226-27800-1
- Sophocles, Antigone (Oxford University Press, 2007). Translated by Reginald Gibbons and Charles Segal. ISBN 978-0-19514310-2
- Goyen: Autobiographical Essays, Notesbooks, Evocations, Interviews, by William Goyen (University of Texas Press, 2007. ISBN 978-0-292-72225-5
- The Complete Sophocles, Volume I: The Theban Plays (Oxford University Press, 2011.) Antigone translated by Reginald Gibbons and Charles Segal. ISBN 978-0-19-538880-0
- The Complete Euripides, Volume IV: Bacchae and Other Plays (Oxford University Press, 2009.) Bacchae translated by Reginald Gibbons and Charles Segal. ISBN 978-0-19-537340-0
- New Writing from Mexico, edited by Reginald Gibbons. TriQuarterly Books, 1992.
- Thomas McGrath: Life and the Poem, edited by Reginald Gibbons and Terrence Des Press. (University of Illinois Press, 1992. ISBN 0-252-06177-2
