= Golden Ax =

2022 poetry collection by Rio Cortez

- Author: Rio Cortez
- Publisher: Penguin Books
- Publication date: August 30, 2022
- Pages: 80
- ISBN: 978-0143137139

Golden Ax is a 2022 poetry collection by Rio Cortez, published by Penguin Books for its Penguin Poets series. It was longlisted for the 2022 National Book Award for Poetry.

== Content ==
A black woman, Cortez grew up in Salt Lake City and went to Catholic school; there, in addition to the isolation of being one of the few black children around, Cortez "felt marginalized" as someone who wasn't brought up as a Mormon. One of her family members, however, was a Black Mormon leader named Abner Howell. Cortez's poems in Golden Ax thus consider the history of the Great Salt Lake region through the lens of race. Some of her poems reimagine popular culture characters like Annie Hall and Frasier Crane with blackness as part of her project to understand the "Black West."

Cortez uses the terms "Afrofrontierism" and "Afropioneerism" to describe the history of African Americans in the American West. In an interview with the Poetry Foundation, Cortez said she had derived the terms from the prevalence of "pioneering" in Utah's self-described history—"pioneer parades, pioneer parks, pioneer museums"—as well as the decision for Cortez's ancestors to pursue the frontier after freedom. Cortez also drew inspiration from Afrofuturism, specifically Octavia E. Butler's Kindred, which is referenced in the book: "I think frontier and future—these places that aren't here, places that are somewhere else, somewhere where you're not subjugated, where there's maximum freedom—are extremely compelling to people who have come from a history of enslavement."

To research the book, Cortez consulted numerous materials and sources, including her second great-aunt's book, Utah and the Early Black Settlers, as well as The Story of the Negro Pioneer, a 1965 pamphlet from the Daughters of Utah Pioneers Memorial Museum. In Shondaland, Cortez said that "In this collection, a lot of it is oral history, family stories that are retold."

== Critical reception ==
The book was longlisted for the 2022 National Book Award for Poetry and the 2023 PEN Open Book Award.

In a starred review, Publishers Weekly called the book an "exquisite debut" and concluded that "Unflinching and generous, this bold collection opens new vistas in contemporary Black poetry."

Many critics were drawn to Cortez's poetic approach to identity and history. Diego Báez for the Poetry Foundation observed the "chilling" lines and the "haunting, bucolic imagery" of Cortez's poems. Hayden's Ferry Review said "Cortez’s own recollection of girlhood, family, and identity is deeply affecting and endears us to the extraordinary and mundane parts of her characters’ lives. These poems not only acknowledge but also celebrate aging, femininity, and motherhood." MudRoom wrote that "Golden Ax is laden with history, memory, and want: want of a future, want of a full and documented past, and most importantly, want of understanding." Washington Independent Review of Books said:

"Cortez, like many other writers from the African diaspora, strives not only to imagine that future but to recreate an ancestral past that has been stolen—due to the erasure of colonization and slavery—while celebrating the known migrations of her family to what was once the ultimate wild, dangerous, and racially romanticized as almost exclusively white frontier: the West."

The book was placed on NPR's list of Books We Love for 2022. Houston Chronicle called it one of the best books of 2022.
