= Creatures of a Day =

align

Creatures of a Day is the eighth book of poetry by Reginald Gibbons (b. 1947). It was published in 2008 and was a finalist for the National Book Award for Poetry in that year.
