= William Morris Meredith Jr. =

American poet (1919-2007)

William Meredith
- Born: William Morris Meredith Jr. January 9, 1919; New York City, New York, U.S.
- Died: May 30, 2007 (aged 88); New London, Connecticut, U.S.
- Burial place: West Laurel Hill Cemetery, Bala Cynwyd, Pennsylvania, U.S.
- Education: Princeton University (BA)
- Occupations: Author; poet; professor
- Partner: Richard Harteis (1970s–2007)
- Writing career
- Notable awards: National Book Award (1997); Pulitzer Prize (1988)

William Morris Meredith Jr. (January 9, 1919 – May 30, 2007) was an American poet and educator. He served as a naval aviator during World War II and the Korean War. He taught at Princeton University, Middlebury College, University of Hawaiʻi, and Connecticut College from 1955 until 1983.

In 1963, he was appointed chancellor of the Academy of American Poets. He was Poet Laureate Consultant in Poetry to the Library of Congress from 1978 to 1980 and received the Pulitzer Prize for Poetry in 1988. He received a Senior Fellowship at the National Endowment for the Arts, a Los Angeles Times Book Award, the National Book Award for Poetry, and a Guggenheim Fellowship in poetry.

== Early life and education ==
Meredith was born January 9, 1919, in New York City to William Morris Meredith Sr. and Nelley Keyser. He graduated in 1936 from Lenox School in Massachusetts. He began writing poetry while a college student at Princeton University. He graduated magna cum laude from Princeton in 1940. He wrote his senior thesis on Robert Frost who was an influence throughout Meredith's career.

== Career ==
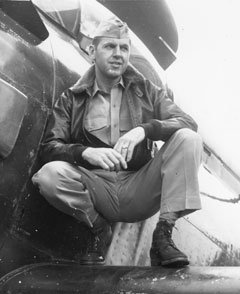
Meredith on the wing of his aircraft circa 1952/1954

Meredith worked briefly for the New York Times as a copy boy and reporter before joining the United States Army Air Force in 1941. The next year, he transferred to the United States Navy as a carrier pilot. He served in the Aleutian Islands and Pacific Theater and reached the rank of lieutenant. He continued his service in the United States Navy Reserve until 1952, when he reenlisted to serve in the Korean War. He ultimately attained the rank of lieutenant commander and was awarded two Air Medals.

His first volume of poetry, Love Letter from an Impossible Land, was published in 1944 and received critical acclaim. Archibald MacLeish selected it for publication as part of the Yale Series of Younger Poets Competition.

He taught English and was Woodrow Wilson Fellow in Writing, and Resident Fellow in Creative Writing at Princeton University for four years. He was an associate professor at the University of Hawaii (1950–51). In 1955, he was hired as an associate professor of English at Connecticut College, where he taught until 1983. He taught at the Bread Loaf School of English at Middlebury College for four years. He was also an instructor at the Bread Loaf Writers' Conference from 1964 to 1971.

In 1963, Meredith was appointed chancellor of the Academy of American Poets. From 1978 to 1980, he was Consultant in Poetry to the Library of Congress.

In 1983, Meredith suffered a stroke which affected his ability to speak and use language.

He translated the works of several Bulgarian poets and introduced them to the English speaking poetry world through his publication of Poets of Bulgaria in 1986 and Window on the Black Sea in 1992. He translated several of the works of Guillaume Apollinaire including Alcools in 1964.

He received one of first Senior Fellowships of the National Endowment for the Arts in 1984. In 1988, Meredith was awarded the Pulitzer Prize for Poetry and a Los Angeles Times Book Award for Partial Accounts: New and Selected Poems. In 1997, he won the National Book Award for Poetry for Effort at Speech. Meredith also received a Guggenheim Fellowship in poetry, the Harriet Monroe Memorial Prize, and the International Vaptsarov Prize in Poetry.

Meredith died May 30, 2007, in New London, Connecticut, and was interred at West Laurel Hill Cemetery in Bala Cynwyd, Pennsylvania.

== Personal life ==
He lived in Uncasville, Connecticut, with his partner of 36 years, the poet and fiction writer Richard Harteis. He also spent significant time in Bulgaria where he was awarded honorary citizenship in 1996.

== Legacy ==
The William Meredith Foundation and William Meredith Center for the Arts were established in his honor and support residency programs and poetry readings. A film about his life, Marathon, premiered on November 19, 2008, in Mystic, Connecticut.

== Bibliography ==
=== Poetry ===
- Love Letter from an Impossible Land (Yale University Press, 1944)
- Ships and Other Figures (Princeton University Press, 1948)
- The Open Sea and Other Poems (Alfred A. Knopf, 1957)
- The Wreck of the Thresher and Other Poems (Knopf, 1964) —finalist for the National Book Award
- Winter Verse (privately printed, 1964)
- Earth Walk: New and Selected Poems (Knopf, 1970)
- Hazard the Painter (Knopf, 1975) ISBN 978-0-394-49634-4
- The Cheer (Knopf, 1980)
- Partial Accounts: New and Selected Poems (Knopf, 1987) ISBN 978-0-394-75191-7 —winner of the Pulitzer Prize
- Effort at Speech: New and Selected Poems. Northwestern University Press. 1997. ISBN 978-0-8101-5070-6. "William Meredith." —winner of the National Book Award

=== Essays ===
- Reasons for Poetry, and The Reason for Criticism (1982)
- Poems Are Hard to Read, University of Michigan Press, 1991, ISBN 978-0-472-09427-1

=== Translation and Anthology ===
- Guillaume Apollinaire, Alcools: Poems, 1898-1913, Translator (Doubleday, 1964)
- Poets of Bulgaria, Editor (Unicorn Press, 1985) ISBN 978-0-87775-190-8

== Awards ==
- 1988 Pulitzer Prize for Poetry – Partial Accounts
- 1997 National Book Award for Poetry – Effort at Speech
- 1975 Guggenheim Fellowship
