= William Jay Smith =

American poet (1918–2015)

- Born: April 22, 1918 Winnfield, Louisiana, U.S.
- Died: August 18, 2015 (aged 97) Lenox, Massachusetts, U.S.
- Education: Washington University (AB, MA); Columbia University; Wadham College, Oxford; University of Florence
- Notable awards: American Academy of Arts and Letters (1975)

William Jay Smith (April 22, 1918 – August 18, 2015) was an American poet. He was appointed the nineteenth Poet Laureate Consultant in Poetry to the Library of Congress from 1968 to 1970.

== Life ==
William Jay Smith was born in Winnfield, Louisiana. He was brought up at Jefferson Barracks, Missouri, south of St. Louis. Smith received his A.B. and M.A. from Washington University in St. Louis and continued his studies at Columbia University. Smith later attended Wadham College, Oxford as a Rhodes Scholar and continued his education at the University of Florence.

In 1947 he married the poet Barbara Howes and they lived for a time in England and Italy. They had two sons, David Smith and Gregory. They divorced in the mid-1960s.

Smith was a poet in residence at Williams College from 1959 to 1967 and taught at Columbia University from 1973 until 1975. He served as the Professor Emeritus of English literature at Hollins University. He was the first Native American named to the position of Poet Laureate in the United States.

As of 2008, he lived in houses located in both Cummington, Massachusetts, and Paris, France.

Smith was the author of ten collections of poetry of which two were finalists for the National Book Award.

He had been a member of the American Academy of Arts and Letters since 1975.

His work appeared in Harper's Magazine, The New York Review of Books,

== Works ==
=== Poetry ===
- Poems. Banyan Press. 1947.
- Celebration at Dark. Farrar, Straus. 1950.
- The Tin Can and Other Poems. Delacorte Press. 1966.
- His Collected Poems: 1939–1989. C. Scribner's Sons. 1990. ISBN 978-0-684-19167-6.
- The World Below the Window: Poems, 1937–1997. Johns Hopkins University Press. 1998. ISBN 978-0-8018-6783-5. reprint 2002
- The Cherokee Lottery: A Sequence of Poems. Curbstone Press (original from the University of Michigan). 2000.

=== Poems for children ===
- Laughing Time. Delacorte Press/Seymour Lawrence. 1955. ISBN 978-0-440-05534-1. reprint 1980
- Boy Blue's Book of Beasts. Little, Brown. 1957.
- Typewriter Town. Dutton. 1960. ISBN 0-620-11193-3.
- Ho for a Hat!. Joy Street Books. 1964. ISBN 978-0-316-80120-1. rev. ed., 1989
- Laughing Time: Collected Nonsense. Delacorte Press/Seymour Lawrence. 1980. ISBN 978-0-440-05534-1.
- Around My Room. Farrar, Straus and Giroux. 2000. ISBN 978-0-374-30406-5.

=== Translations ===
- Alain Bosquet (July 1995). "Alain Bosquet: Three poems translated by William Jay Smith". The American Poetry Review. Archived from the original on April 13, 2005.
- Poems of a Multimillionaire by Valéry Larbaud (1955)
- Selected Writings of Jules Laforgue. Greenwood Press. 1956. ISBN 978-0-8371-0520-8. reprint 1972
- Two Plays by Charles Bertin : "Christopher Columbus" and "Don Juan" (1970)
- Songs of C, Federico García Lorca (1994).

=== Non-fiction ===
- The streaks of the tulip: selected criticism. Delacorte Press. 1972.
- Army brat: a memoir. Persea Books. 1980. ISBN 978-0-89255-047-0.
- My Friend Tom: The Poet-Playwright Tennessee Williams. University Press of Mississippi. 2012. ISBN 978-1-61703-175-5.

=== Editor ===
- James S. Holmes, William Jay Smith, ed. (1984). Dutch interior. Columbia University Press. ISBN 978-0-231-05746-2.
- Dana Gioia, William Jay Smith, ed. (1985). Poems From Italy. New Rivers Press.

=== Plays ===
- "The Straw Market". Blackbird. Virginia Commonwealth University. Spring 2006.

== Awards ==
- 1945 Young Poets prize, Poetry
- 1964 Ford fellowship for drama
- 1970 Henry Bellamann Major award
- 1972 Loines award
- 1972, 1995 National Endowment for the Arts grant
- 1975, 1989 National Endowment for the Humanities grant
- 1978 Gold Medal of Labor (Hungary)
- 1980 New England Poetry Club Golden Rose Award
- 1982 Ingram Merrill Foundation grant
- 1990 California Children's Book and Video Awards recognition for excellence (pre-school and toddlers category), for Ho for a Hat!
- 1991 medal (médaille de vermeil) for service to the French language, French Academy
- 1993 Pro Cultura Hungarica medal
- twice a nominee for the National Book Award in poetry
- 1997 René Vásquez Díaz prize, Swedish Academy
