= Louis Simpson =

Jamaican poet

- Born: Louis Aston Marantz Simpson; March 27, 1923; Colony of Jamaica
- Died: September 14, 2012 (aged 89); Stony Brook, New York
- Education: Columbia University (BA, MA, PhD)
- Occupation: Poet
- Known for: 1964 Pulitzer Prize for Poetry for his work At the End of the Open Road

Louis Aston Marantz Simpson (March 27, 1923 – September 14, 2012) was an American poet born in Jamaica. He won the 1964 Pulitzer Prize for Poetry for his work At the End of the Open Road.

== Life and career ==
Simpson was born in Jamaica, the son of Rosalind (née Marantz) and Aston Simpson, a lawyer. His father was of Scottish and African ancestry. His mother was born in Russia (Simpson did not find out that he was of Jewish descent until his teenage years). At the age of 17, he emigrated to the United States and began attending Columbia University, where he was a member of the Philolexian Society, and studied under Mark Van Doren. During World War II, from 1943 to 1945 he was a member of the elite 101st Airborne Division and would fight in France, the Netherlands, Belgium, and Germany. Simpson was a runner for the company captain, which involved transporting orders from company headquarters to officers on the front line. His company was involved in a very bloody battle with German forces on the west bank of what is now the Carentan France Marina - Simpson wrote his poem "Carentan O Carentan" about the experience of US troops being ambushed there. In the Netherlands, he was involved in Market Garden and Opheusden fighting. At Veghel his company suffered 21 killed in a brutal shelling while in the local church yard. At Bastogne bitterly cold temperatures had to be endured while the 101st Division was surrounded by enemy forces for days. After the end of the war he attended the University of Paris. Subsequently, he returned to the US and worked as an editor in New York. He later completed his B.A. at Columbia University's School of General Studies in 1948, and completed his M.A. and Ph.D. at Columbia University in 1950 and 1959, respectively.

His first book was The Arrivistes, published in 1949. It was hailed for its strong formal verse, but Simpson later moved away from the style of his early successes and embraced a spare brand of free verse.

He taught at universities including Columbia, the University of California-Berkeley, and the State University of New York at Stony Brook. He also briefly taught at The Stony Brook School prior to his retirement. Simpson's lifelong expatriate status has influenced his poetry, and he often uses the lives of ordinary Americans in order to critically investigate the myths the country tells itself. Although he occasionally revisits the West Indies of his childhood, he always keeps one foot in his adopted country. The outsider's perspective allows him to confront "the terror and beauty of life with a wry sense of humor and a mysterious sense of fate," wrote Edward Hirsch of The Washington Post. Elsewhere Hirsch described Simpson's Pulitzer Prize–winning collection, At the End of the Open Road, as "a sustained meditation on the American character," noting, "The moral genius of this book is that it traverses the open road of American mythology and brings us back to ourselves; it sees us not as we wish to be but as we are." Collected Poems (1988) and There You Are (1995) focus on the lives of everyday citizens, using simple diction and narratives to expose the bewildering reality of the American dream. Poet Mark Jarman hailed Simpson as "a poet of the American character and vernacular."

Simpson lived on the North Shore of Long Island, near Stony Brook, New York. He died on September 14, 2012.

== Awards ==
- 1962 Guggenheim Fellowship
- 1964 Pulitzer Prize
- Rome Prize
- 1998 Harold Morton Landon Translation Award
- 2004 Finalist, Griffin Poetry Prize (International)

== Selected works ==
=== Novels ===
- Riverside Drive. Publisher, Atheneum, 1962

=== Poetry ===
- The Arrivistes: Poems, 1940–1949. Fine Editions Press. 1949.
- Good News of Death. Poets of Today. Vol. 2. Charles Scribner's Sons. 1955.
- A Dream of Governors: Poems. Wesleyan University Press. 1959.
- At the End of the Open Road, Poems. Wesleyan University Press. 1963. ISBN 978-0-8195-2020-3.
- Selected Poems. Harcourt, Brace & World. 1965.
- Adventures of the Letter I. Harper & Row. 1971. ISBN 9780060138844.
- Searching for the Ox. Oxford University Press. 1976. ISBN 978-0-19-211860-8.
- Armidale. The Book Bus. 1979.
- Caviare at the Funeral. F. Watts. 1980. ISBN 978-0-531-09937-7.
- The Best Hour of the Night. Ticknor & Fields. 1983. ISBN 978-0-89919-203-1.
- People Live Here: Selected Poems 1949–83. BOA Editions. 1983. ISBN 978-0-918526-43-4.
- Collected Poems. Paragon House. 1988. ISBN 978-1-55778-047-8.
- In the Room We Share. Paragon House. 1990. ISBN 978-1-55778-261-8.
- There You Are: Poems. Story Line Press. 1995. ISBN 978-1-885266-15-6.
- The Owner of the House: New Collected Poems, 1940–2001. BOA Editions, Ltd. 2003. ISBN 978-1-929918-39-3. "Louis Aston Marantz Simpson."
- Struggling Times. BOA Editions, Ltd. 2009. ISBN 9781934414194.
- Voices in the Distance: Selected Poems. Bloodaxe Books. 2010. ISBN 978-1-85224-861-1.

Translations

- Louis Aston Marantz, ed. (1997). Modern Poets of France: a bilingual anthology. Story Line Press. ISBN 978-1-885266-44-6.

=== Non-fiction ===
- James Hogg: A Critical study. St. Martin's Press. 1962.
- Louis Aston Marantz Simpson, ed. (1968). An Introduction to Poetry. Macmillan.
- Air with Armed Men. London Magazine Editions. 1972.
- North of Jamaica. New York Harper and Row. 1972.
- Three on the Tower. Morrow. 1975. ISBN 978-0-688-02899-2.
- A Revolution in Taste: Studies of Dylan Thomas, Allen Ginsberg, Sylvia Plath, and Robert Lowell. MacMillan. 1978. ISBN 978-0-02-611320-5.
- A Company of Poets. University of Michigan Press. 1981. ISBN 978-0-472-06326-0.
- The Character of the Poet. University of Michigan Press. 1986. ISBN 978-0-472-09369-4.
- Selected Prose. Paragon House. 1989. ISBN 978-1-55778-048-5.
- Ships Going Into the Blue: Essays and Notes on Poetry. University of Michigan Press. 1994. ISBN 978-0-472-09559-9.
- The King My Father's Wreck. Story Line Press. 1994. ISBN 978-0-934257-09-1.
