= Sally Wen Mao =

American poet

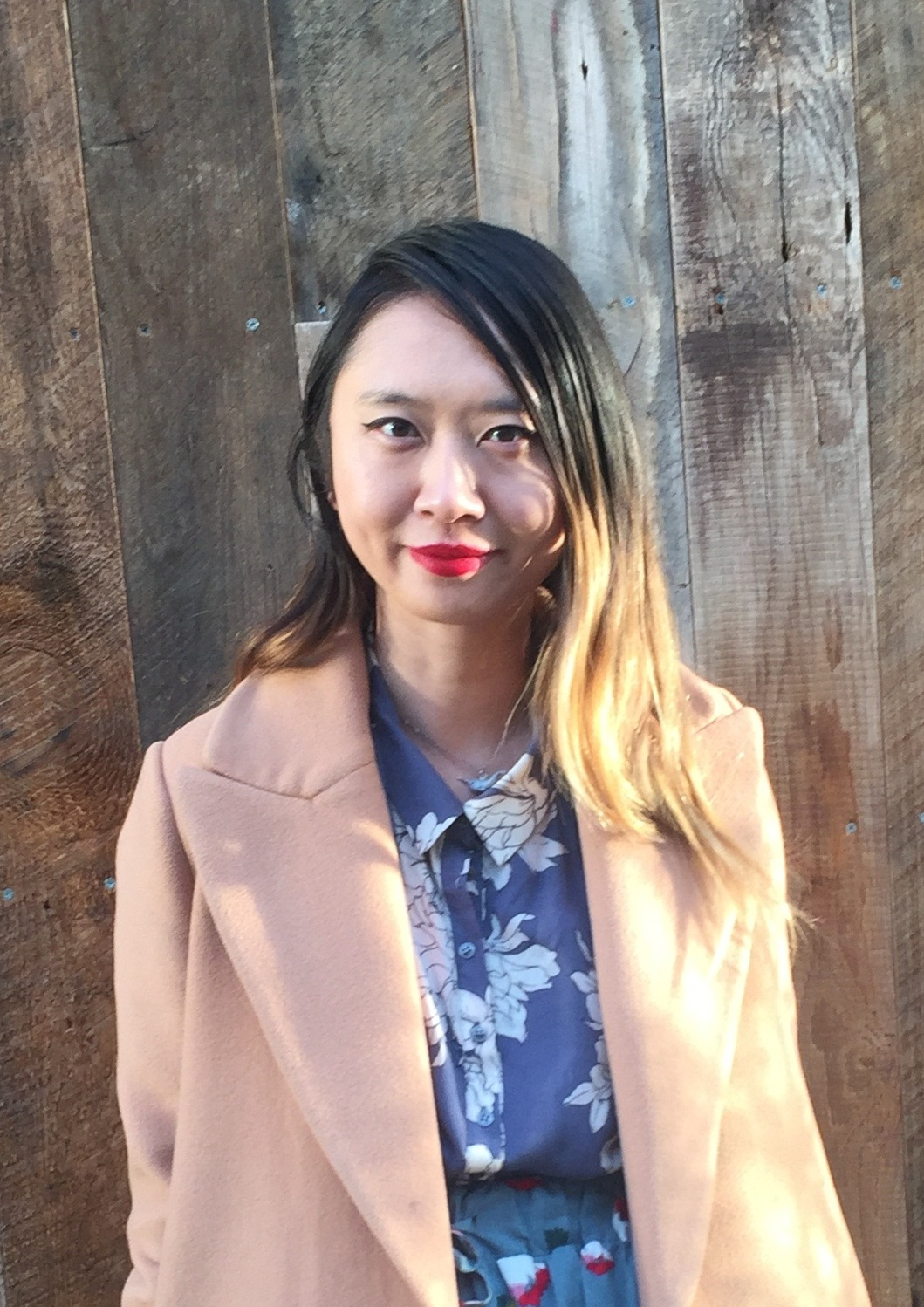
Sally Wen Mao, in 2017.

Sally Wen Mao (born in Wuhan, China) is an American poet. She won a 2017 Pushcart Prize.

== Life ==
She grew up in Boston and the Bay Area. She graduated from Carnegie Mellon University with a BFA and Cornell University, with an MFA.

Her work has appeared in A Public Space, Poetry Magazine, Bomb, Diagram, Four Way Review, Indiana Review, Kenyon Review, Missouri Review, Muzzle, Superstitution, and Washington Square Review. Her first book of poems, Mad Honey Symposium, was published by Alice James Books in 2014, and her second book, Oculus, was published by Graywolf Press in 2019. Oculus has been reviewed by The New Yorker.

From 2016 to 2017, she was a fellow at the Cullman Center for Writers and Scholars at The New York Public Library.

From 2017 to 2018, she was Jenny McKean Moore Writer-in-Residence at George Washington University.

Sally is a Kundiman fellow.

== Works ==
- Mad Honey Symposium Alice James Books, 2014. ISBN 978-1938584060
- Oculus, Graywolf Press, 2019. ISBN 9781555978259, OCLC 1036096587
- The Kingdom of Surfaces, Graywolf Press, 2023. ISBN 9781644452370, OCLC 1345220012
