= Hydra Medusa =

2023 poetry collection by Brandon Shimoda

- Author: Brandon Shimoda
- Publisher: Nightboat Books
- Publication date: June 27, 2023
- Pages: 144
- ISBN: 978-1643621715
- Preceded by: The Grave on the Wall
- Followed by: The Afterlife Is Letting Go

Hydra Medusa is a 2023 poetry collection by Brandon Shimoda, published by Nightboat Books.

== Contents and background ==
A hybrid book, Hydra Medusa features both poems and essays. Similar to Shimoda's previous works, the book concerns Japanese American incarceration during World War II. The book took three years to write and was born in response to certain events in Shimoda's family life, including his ongoing reflection of the death of his grandfather, Midori Shimoda. It also concerns the desert, a place of importance to Shimoda's own life, his loved ones, and his artistic influences.

When asked about his reason for always pursuing hybrid forms in his work, Shimoda stated, "Hybridity, for me, is, less about form, more about emotions and the process of learning. These things (emotions, learning) are related ... When thinking about JA incarceration I become angry, bewildered, bored, depressed, inflamed, empowered, in love; each inspires a different approach to writing, form following affection."

The book's cover art is a grass mantis drawing by Manabu Ikeda, an artist whose art was also featured on Shimoda's previous poetry collection, O Bon, from 2011. Shimoda stated "The mantis is an important figure in my life. For many years, especially in the desert, whenever I was struggling through a depressive episode, a praying mantis would appear, often on a threshold: a door, doorway, doorstep, windowsill, window."

== Critical reception ==
Publishers Weekly wrote that "This politically and philosophically meditative outing is a timely and memorable exploration of history and place."

Los Angeles Review of Books compared Shimoda's work to the visual art of Cory Feder in that they both concern "the unlikely physics of dreams, emanating a flummoxing, mythical quality." The reviewer concluded that "Historical violence has a way of scattering narratives and people across time, space, and consciousness. Brandon Shimoda's work acknowledges this and does something about it." The Poetry Foundation observed an airy quality about Shimoda's work, calling it "titanium-light" but still sensing "the gathered emotion" which "vibrates beneath each line".

The Brooklyn Rail called the book a transformative experience to read, stating that it moves through different realms: life, death, and the interstitial, haunted spaces in between, "around you, below you, through you, behind." The reviewer also noted Shimoda's typical themes throughout his other works, namely that of the grave and its memory. Similarly, Los Angeles Review of Books, in reviewing the book alongside Eleni Sikelianos' Your Kingdom, stated lauded the book for how it "seeks to illuminate the hybridity of living through the evolving terrors of the United States—in which the traumas of internment camps and border policies, and the systemic dismissal of such traumas, are co-animating forces hybridizing the same society."

Cleveland Review of Books observed the way Shimoda used language in order to move backwards and forwards in history, connecting himself to the lineages of his grandfather, Midori Shimoda, as well as his other ancestors. Building upon Shimoda's existing body of work on the matter, the reviewer said: "The place from which Midori could not escape is that to which Shimoda labors to return, and within this inversion, Japanese American Incarceration becomes an almost paradoxical site of desire, even worship, into which the next generation dreams."

Heavy Feather Review began with an observation of the prose elements in the book: "The essays of Hydra Medusa do what Shimoda always does well: write clearly and cogently, but with turns that take us somewhere we recognize but didn't anticipate." Later, the reviewer noted the poetry's insistence on the desert, a place which Shimoda has lived in—specifically near Tucson, Arizona—as well as a place which has been written about in his previous poetry collection, The Desert. Of it, the reviewer said that, to Shimoda, the desert must be a place "of memory and survival" but also a place with "poisoned land and thoughts."

Northwest Review remarked on Shimoda's approach to the perennial topic of life and death through his dreamy, hauntological passages, concluding: "Every line of Shimoda's poetry, in my mind, represents the fruit of his diligent work unpacking this idea, such that each stanza is a brief flicker of clarity, and every space between words a deep breath intended to make room in time for his readers to savor that clarity." Similarly, Alta Journal wrote that "In Hydra Medusa, then, reality is its own sort of dreamscape, in which time and space are less important than our connection and responsibility to one another, even across the great divide of death." Poetry Northwest said "Memory, dream, witness, living and dead—all these elements become confused in Hydra Medusa. It is as if the world were being fed into dreams or the dreams fed outward."
