= PEN Open Book Award =

Award to foster racial and ethnic diversity

The PEN Open Book Award (known as the Beyond Margins Award through 2009) is an award intended to foster racial and ethnic diversity within the literary and publishing communities, and works to establish access for diverse literary groups to the publishing industry. Created in 1991 by the PEN American Center (today PEN America), the award ensures custodians of language and literature are representative of the American people.

The Committee discusses mutual concerns and strategies for advancing writing and professional activities, and coordinates Open Book events. While multiple awards were presented in previous years, the PEN Open Book Award now presents one award every year to books published in the United States (but without citizenship or residency requirements) by "authors of color who have not received wide media coverage".

The award is one of many PEN awards sponsored by International PEN affiliates in over 145 PEN centers around the world. The PEN American Center awards have been characterized as being among the "major" American literary prizes.

== Honorees ==
=== PEN Open Book Award ===
After 2010, the Beyond Margins Award was renamed the PEN Open Book Award.

PEN Open Book Award winners and finalists
Year	Author	Title	Result	Ref.
2011	Manu Joseph	Serious Men	Winner	
2011	John Murillo	Up Jump the Boogie	Runner Up	
2012	Siddhartha Deb	The Beautiful and the Damned: A Portrait of the New India	Winner	
2012	Helon Habila	Oil on Water	Finalist	
2012	Quan Barry	Water Puppets	Finalist	
2013	Gina Apostol	Gun Dealers' Daughter	Winner (tie)	
2013	Kevin Young	The Grey Album	Winner (tie)	
2013	Francine J. Harris	Allegiance	Finalist	
2013	Brenda Shaughnessy	Our Andromeda	Finalist	
2013	Natalie Diaz	When My Brother Was an Aztec	Finalist	
2014	Nina McConigley	Cowboys and East Indians	Winner (tie)	
2014	Ruth Ellen Kocher	domina Un/blued	Winner (tie)	
2014	Kwame Dawes	Duppy Conqueror	Finalist	
2014	Taiye Selasi	Ghana Must Go	Finalist	
2014	Jennifer Foerster	Leaving Tulsa	Finalist	
2015	Claudia Rankine	Citizen: An American Lyric	Winner	
2015	Rabih Alameddine	An Unnecessary Woman	Finalist	
2015	Roxane Gay	An Untamed State	Finalist	
2015	Teju Cole	Every Day Is for the Thief	Finalist	
2015	Samrat Upadhyay	The City Son	Finalist	
2016	Rick Barot	Chord	Winner	
2016	Reginald Dwayne Betts	Bastards of the Reagan Era	Finalist	
2016	Vievee Francis	Forest Primeval: Poems	Finalist	
2016	Lauret Savoy	Trace: Memory, History, Race, and the American Landscape	Finalist	
2016	Marie Mutsuki Mockett	Where the Dead Pause, and the Japanese Say Goodbye: A Journey	Finalist	
2017	Helen Oyeyemi	What Is Not Yours Is Not Yours	Winner	
2017	Monica Youn	Blackacre	Finalist	
2017	Solmaz Sharif	Look	Finalist	
2017	Jamaal May	The Big Book of Exit Strategies	Finalist	
2017	Petina Gappah	The Book of Memory	Finalist	
2018	Alexis Okeowo	A Moonless, Starless Sky: Ordinary Women and Men Fighting Extremism in Africa	Winner	
2018	Kei Miller	Augustown	Finalist	
2018	Erika L. Sánchez	Lessons on Expulsion: Poems	Finalist	
2018	Jessica B. Harris	My Soul Looks Back: A Memoir	Finalist	
2018	Nicole Sealey	Ordinary Beast: Poems	Finalist	
2019	Nafissa Thompson-Spires	Heads of the Colored People	Winner	
2019	Shauna Barbosa	Cape Verdean Blues	Finalist	
2019	Jenny Xie	Eye Level	Finalist	
2019	Tyrese Coleman	How to Sit: A Memoir in Stories and Essays	Finalist	
2019	Ángel García	Teeth Never Sleep	Finalist	
2020	Brandon Shimoda	The Grave on the Wall	Winner	
2020	Camonghne Felix	Build Yourself a Boat	Finalist	
2020	Carmen Giménez Smith	Be Recorder	Finalist	
2020	Maya Phillips	Erou	Finalist	
2020	Maurice Carlos Ruffin	We Cast a Shadow	Finalist	
2021	Asako Serizawa	Inheritors	Winner	
2021	Mei-mei Berssenbrugge	A Treatise on Stars	Finalist	
2021	Souvankham Thammavongsa	How to Pronounce Knife: Stories	Finalist	
2021	Hafizah Geter	Un-American	Finalist	
2021	S*an D. Henry-Smith	Wild Peach	Finalist	
2022	Divya Victor	Curb	Winner	
2022	Rebecca Hall	Wake: The Hidden History of Women-Led Slave Revolts	Finalist	
2022	Rajiv Mohabir	Antiman: A Hybrid Memoir	Finalist	
2022	Thirii Myo Kyaw Myint	Names for Light: A Family History	Finalist	
2022	Elissa Washuta	White Magic	Finalist	
2023	Hafizah Augustus Geter	The Black Period	Winner	
2023	Ramona Emerson	Shutter	Finalist	
2023	Casey Rocheteau	Gorgoneion	Finalist	
2023	Paul Tran	All The Flowers Kneeling	Finalist	
2023	Toya Wolfe	Last Summer on State Street	Finalist	
2024	Jacqueline Crooks	Fire Rush	Winner	
2024	Ava Chin	Mott Street: A Chinese American Family’s Story of Exclusion and Homecoming	Finalist	
2024	Soraya Palmer	The Human Origins of Beatrice Porter and Other Essential Ghosts	Finalist	
2024	Parini Shroff	The Bandit Queens	Finalist	
2025	Kali Nicole Gross	Vengeance Feminism: The Power of Black Women’s Fury in Lawless Times	Winner	
2025	James B. Haile III	The Dark Delight of Being Strange: Black Stories of Freedom	Finalist	
2025	Jenn M. Jackson	Black Women Taught Us: An Intimate History of Black Feminism	Finalist	
2025	Rae Giana Rashad	The Blueprint	Finalist	
2026	Rickey Fayne	The Devil Three Times	Finalist	
2026	Justin Haynes	Ibis	Finalist	
2026	Kilbourne Brandon	Natural History	Finalist	
2026	Samyak Shertok	No Rhododendrons	Finalist	
2026	Mary Annette Pember	Medicine River: A Story of Survival and the Legacy of Indian Boarding Schools	Finalist	

=== Beyond Margins Award ===
Prior to 2010, the PEN Open Book Award was referred to as the Beyond Margins Award, and several books were selected per year as joint winners.

Beyond Margins Award winners
Year	Author	Title
Earlier winners	Giannina Braschi	Yo-Yo Boing!
Earlier winners	Timothy Liu	Say Goodnight
Earlier winners	Bino Realuyo (ed.)	The NuyorAsian Anthology
Earlier winners	April Robinson	
2002	Meena Alexander	Illiterate Heart
2002	Luis Francia	Eye of the Fish
2002	Joy Harjo	A Map to the Next World: Poetry and Tales
2002	Victor LaValle	Slapboxing with Jesus: Stories
2002	Nelly Rosario	Song of the Water Saints
2004	Laila Halaby	West of the Jordan: A Novel
2004	Suki Kim	The Interpreter
2004	Nasdijj	The Boy and the Dog Are Sleeping
2004	Willie Perdomo	Smoking Lovely
2004	April Reynolds	Knee-Deep in Wonder: A Novel
2005	Faith Adiele	Meeting Faith: The Forest Journals of a Black Buddhist Nun
2005	Raquel Cepeda (ed.)	And It Don’t Stop: The Best American Hip-Hop Journalism of the Last 25 Years
2005	Lan Samantha Chang	Inheritance
2005	Lolita Hernandez	Autopsy of an Engine, and Other Stories from the Cadillac Plant
2005	Ishle Yi Park	The Temperature of This Water
2006	Richard Blanco	Directions to the Beach of the Dead
2006	Andrew Lam	Perfume Dreams: Reflections on the Vietnamese Diaspora
2006	Ed Bok Lee	Real Karaoke People
2006	Caryl Phillips	Dancing in the Dark
2006	Jennifer Tseng	The Man with My Face
2007	Chimamanda Ngozi Adichie	Half of a Yellow Sun
2007	Ernest Hardy	Blood Beats, Vol. 1
2007	Harryette Mullen	Recyclopedia
2007	Alberto Ríos	Theater of Night
2008	Chris Abani	Song for Night
2008	Amiri Baraka	Tales of the Out and the Gone
2008	Frances Hwang	Transparency
2008	Naeem Murr	The Perfect Man
2008	Joseph M. Marshall III	The Day the World Ended at Little Big Horn
2009	Uwem Akpan	Say You're One of Them
2009	Juan Felipe Herrera	Half of the World in Light: New and Selected Poems
2009	Lily Hoang	Changing
2010	Sherwin Bitsui	Flood Song
2010	Robin D. G. Kelley	Thelonious Monk: The Life and Times of an American Original
2010	Canyon Sam	Sky Train: Tibetan Women on the Edge of History
