= PEN America =

American association of writers

- Formation: 1922; 104 years ago
- Type: Literary society, human rights organization
- Legal status: 501(c)(3) nonprofit organization
- Purpose: Publication, advocacy, literary awards
- Headquarters: New York City, US
- Coordinates: 40.724920°N 73.997163°W
- Members: Private
- Official language: English
- President: Phil Klay
- Key people: Board of Trustees
- Parent organization: PEN International
- Affiliations: International Freedom of Expression Exchange
- Website: pen.org

PEN America (formerly PEN American Center), founded in 1922, and headquartered in New York City, is a 501(c)(3) nonprofit organization whose goal is to raise awareness for the protection of free expression in the United States and worldwide through the advancement of literature and human rights. PEN America is the largest of the more than 100 PEN centers worldwide that together compose PEN International. PEN America has offices in New York City, Los Angeles, Washington, D.C., and since late 2023 also in Florida.

PEN America's advocacy includes work on educational censorship, press freedom and the safety of writers, campus free speech, online harassment, artistic freedom, and support to regions of the world with challenges to freedom of expression. PEN America also campaigns for individual writers and journalists who have been imprisoned or come under threat for their work and annually presents the PEN/Barbey Freedom to Write Award.

PEN America hosts public programming and events on literature and human rights, including the PEN World Voices Festival of International Literature and the annual PEN America Literary Awards, sometimes referred to as the "Oscars of Books." PEN America also works to amplify underrepresented voices, including emerging authors and writers who are undocumented, incarcerated, or face obstacles in reaching audiences.

The organization's name was conceived as an acronym for "Poets, Essayists, Novelists" (later broadened to "Poets, Playwrights, Editors, Essayists, Novelists"). As its membership expanded to include a more diverse range of people involved in literature and freedom of expression, the United States branch of the organization decided it would no longer treat PEN as an acronym.

== History ==
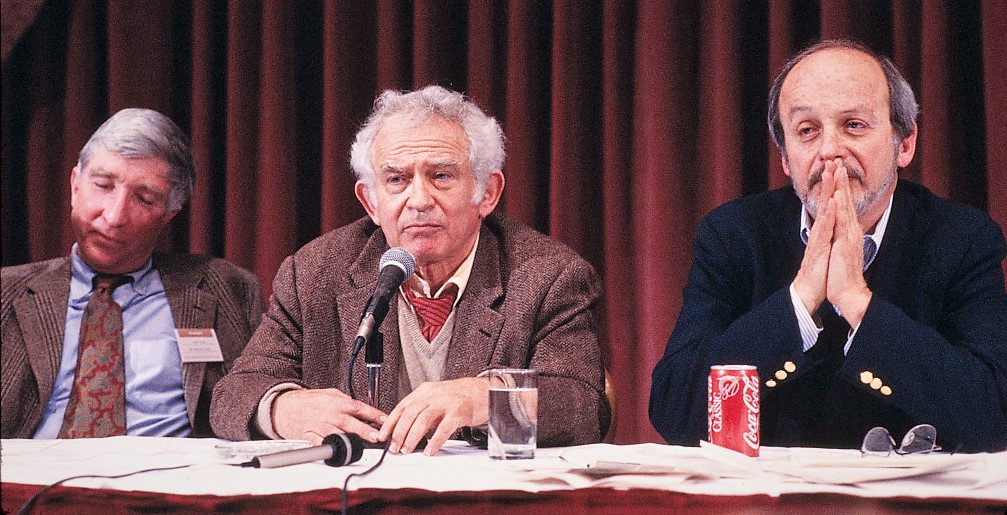
The 1986 PEN congress: (left to right) John Updike, Norman Mailer, E. L. Doctorow

PEN America was formed on April 19, 1922, in New York City, and included among its initial members writers such as Willa Cather, Eugene O'Neill, Robert Frost, Ellen Glasgow, Edwin Arlington Robinson, and Robert Benchley. Booth Tarkington served as the organization's first president.

PEN America's founding came after the launch of PEN International in 1921 in London by Catherine Amy Dawson-Scott, a British poet, playwright, and peace activist, who enlisted John Galsworthy as PEN International's first president. The intent of PEN International was to foster international literary fellowship among writers that would transcend national and ethnic divides in the wake of World War I. PEN America subscribes to the principles outlined in the PEN International Charter.

PEN America presidents have included Jennifer Finney Boylan, Ayad Akhtar, Kwame Anthony Appiah, Louis Begley, Ron Chernow, Joel Conarroe, Jennifer Egan, Frances FitzGerald, Peter Godwin, Francine Prose, Salman Rushdie, Michael Scammell, and Andrew Solomon.

In 2018, the organization filed suit against President Trump for allegedly using the powers of his office to retaliate against unfavorable reporting. In 2023, it filed suit against the school district in Escambia County, Florida, over book bans, joined by publisher Penguin Random House, several banned authors, and parents in the district.

As of June 2022, PEN America staff announced their intention to unionize. The Los Angeles Times reported that workers unionized with Unit of Work, a venture capitalist startup to help workers unionize, and that PEN America recognized the union the day after it was announced.

PEN America celebrated its centenary in 2022 with an event featuring authors Chimamanda Ngozi Adichie, Margaret Atwood, Jennifer Finney Boylan, and Dave Eggers; an exhibition at the New York Historical Society; and a large light-projection by the artist Jenny Holzer at the Rockefeller Center.

== PEN Board of Trustees ==
The PEN America Board of Trustees is composed of writers, artists, and leaders in the fields of publishing, media, technology, law, finance, human rights, and philanthropy.

As of 17 September 2026, novelist Phil Klay was selected as president of PEN America. He replaces novelist Dinaw Mengestu who was elected president of PEN America on Dec. 17, 2025, taking over from Jennifer Finney Boylan, author and LGBTQ rights advocate, who became president of PEN America on December 11, 2023. She succeeded Ayad Akhtar, a recipient of the Pulitzer Prize who was named president December 2, 2020, and Jennifer Egan, a recipient of the Pulitzer Prize and the 2018 Carnegie Medal for literary excellence, who became president in 2018. Other members of the Board of Trustees Executive Committee are: Executive Vice President Tracy Higgins, Treasurer Markus Dohle, Secretary Marie Arana, Vice President Marvin S. Putnam, and Executive Committee Members Peter Barbey, Patricia Fili-Krushel, and Michael Pietsch.

Additional trustees are: David Shelley, Morwin Schmookler, Phil Klay Luis Alberto Urrea, Ipek S. Burnett, John Chao, Roxanne Donovan, Patricia Duff,Tom Healy, Jennifer Finney Boylan, Scott Frank, Jeannie Suk Gersen, Elizabeth Hemmerdinger, Linda E. Johnson, Zachary Karabell, Amitava Kumar, Allison Markin Powell, Ken Miller, Paul Muldoon, Lynn Nottage, George Packer, Jodi Picoult, Krystyna Poray Goddu, Alix Ritchie, Anya Salama, Esmeralda Santiago, Andrew Solomon, Suzy Wahba, Tara Westover, and Jamie Wolf.

== Literature ==
PEN America holds multiple events in the United States throughout the year with the goal of celebrating literature in multiple forms. Many feature prominent authors who appear at festivals and on panel discussions, give lectures, and are featured at PEN America's Authors' Evenings. As a part of its work, PEN America also gives recognition to emerging writers, recognizing them through PEN America's Literary Awards or bringing them to new audiences at public events. Among them are: Hermione Hoby, Morgan Jerkins, Crystal Hana Kim, Alice Sola Kim, Lisa Ko, Layli Long Soldier, Carmen Maria Machado, Darnell L. Moore, Alexis Okeowo, Helen Oyeyemi, Tommy Pico, Jenny Zhang, and Ibi Zoboi.

=== PEN World Voices Festival ===
The PEN World Voices Festival is a week-long series of events in New York City hosted by PEN America each spring. It is the largest international literary festival in the United States, and the only one with a human rights focus. The festival was founded by Salman Rushdie in the aftermath of September 11 Attacks, with the aim of broadening channels of dialogue between the United States and the world.

Notable guests have included: Chimamanda Ngozi Adichie, Margaret Atwood, Paul Auster, Samantha Bee, Giannina Braschi, Carrie Brownstein, Ron Chernow, Hillary Rodham Clinton, Ta-Nehisi Coates, Teju Cole, E. L. Doctorow, Dave Eggers, Roxane Gay, Masha Gessen, John Irving, Marlon James, Saeed Jones, Jhumpa Lahiri, Ottessa Moshfegh, Hasan Minaj, Sean Penn, Cecile Richards, Salman Rushdie, Gabourey Sidibe, Patti Smith, Zadie Smith, Andrew Solomon, Pia Tafdrup, Ngugi wa Thiong'o, Colm Toibin, Amor Towles, and Colson Whitehead.

=== PEN America Literary Awards ===
The PEN America Literary Awards annually honor outstanding voices in literature across genres, including fiction, poetry, drama, science and writing, essays, biography, and children's literature. PEN America confers 11 awards, fellowships, grants, and prizes each year, presenting nearly US$350,000 to writers and translators.

As of 2018, the US$75,000 PEN/Jean Stein Book Award is the top award given by PEN America, and among the largest literary prizes in the United States. Among other awards conferred are the $25,000 PEN/Hemingway Award for a Debut Novel, the $25,000 PEN/Bingham Award for a Debut Short Story Collection, and the $10,000 PEN Open Book Award for new books by writers of color.

=== PEN America Literary Gala and PEN America Los Angeles Gala ===
The PEN America Literary Gala in New York and PEN America Los Angeles Gala are annual events celebrating free expression and the literary arts. These events include tributes and calls to action to audiences of authors, screenwriters, producers, executives, philanthropists, actors, and other devotees of the written word. Honorees have included Salman Rushdie, Stephen King, J. K. Rowling, Toni Morrison, and Margaret Atwood. Celebrated writers serve as Literary Hosts for the events.

=== PEN America Prison and Justice Writing Program ===
Founded in 1971, the PEN Prison Writing Program provides hundreds of inmates across the country with writing resources and audiences for their work. The program sponsors an annual writing contest, publishes a free writing handbook for prisoners, provides one-on-one mentoring to inmates whose writing shows promise, and seeks to bring inmates' work to the public through literary events, readings and publications. PEN America also provides assistance to other prison writing initiatives around the country and offers a Writing for Justice Fellowship for writers inside and outside of prison seeking to advance the conversation around the challenges of mass incarceration through creative expression.

=== Support to writers ===
The PEN Writers' Emergency Fund assists professional writers in acute, emergency financial crisis. PEN America Membership committees focus on the interests of literary professionals in different fields and include the Translation Committee and the Children and Young Adult Book Authors Committee. The Emerging Voices Fellowship is a literary mentorship that aims to provide new writers who are isolated from the literary establishment with the tools, skills, and knowledge they need to launch a professional writing career. The DREAMing Out Loud program helps aspiring migrant writers. PEN America also has offered workshops that nurture the writing skills of domestic workers, taxi drivers, street vendors, and others wage earners.

=== Publications ===
PEN America has several periodic publications. They include the Prison Writing Awards Anthology featuring winning entries from the annual contest for incarcerated authors, and PEN America Best Debut Short Stories, a yearly anthology of fiction by the recipients of the PEN/Robert J. Dau Short Story Prize for Emerging Writers.

== Free expression ==
PEN America's free expression programs defend writers and journalists and protect free expression rights in the United States and around the world. This work includes research and reports on topical issues, advocacy internationally and in the United States, and campaigns on policy issues and on behalf of individual writers and journalists under threat.

=== Education and Legal Advocacy ===
After 2020, PEN America increasingly focused on tracking book bans, including with its annual Banned in the USA report and educational censorship in public schools and higher education, including "educational gag order" bills. In 2023, PEN America, along with publisher Penguin Random House and several banned authors, and parents, filed suit against the Escambia County School District, claiming that book bans violate Constitutional rights to free speech and equal protection under the law. Pen America has since continued this legal battle in other states. In April 2025, the American Civil Liberties Union of Tennessee sued Rutherford County School District on Behalf of PEN America. The complaint questioned the constitutionality of a Tennessee state law. The state law allowed the school board to evaluate any book brought to their attention and determine is suitability for students. The complaint named approximately 61 titles that were either restricted or fully banned. The organization also hosts regular Free Speech Advocacy Institutes to train young people to advocate for free speech.

=== Writers at risk ===
PEN America's work is sustained advocacy on behalf of individual writers and journalists who are being persecuted because of their work. With help from its members and supporters, PEN America carries out campaigns to ensure the freedom, safety, and ability to write and publish without constraint. Advocacy is conducted from PEN America's Washington, D.C., office, as well as through national and international campaigns, events, reports, and delegations. The organization publishes an index of threats to writers and gives out an annual Freedom to Write award. PEN America also focuses on countries and regions where free expression is under particular challenge, including China, Myanmar, Russia, Belarus, Ukraine, and Central Asia.

=== Press freedom and disinformation ===
PEN America monitors the freedom of the press and safety of journalists in the United States and internationally. PEN America also focuses on issues of fraudulent news and media literacy, and has produced an in-depth report, "Faking News: Fraudulent News and the Fight for Truth", alongside its "News Consumers Bill of Rights and Responsibilities." Recent work focuses on how to fight disinformation ahead of the 2024 presidential election, with particular focus on Florida, Texas, and Arizona.

=== Campus free speech ===
PEN America has a focus on issues surrounding free speech at colleges and universities and seeks to raise awareness of the First Amendment and foster constructive dialogue that upholds the free speech rights of all on campus. This work includes the "PEN America Principles on Campus Free Speech", and the report "And Campus for All: Diversity, Inclusion, and Freedom of Speech at U.S. Universities".

=== Digital safety and online abuse ===
In April 2018, PEN America launched the Online Harassment Field Manual in an effort to aid writers and journalists who must navigate online spaces by providing resources, tools, and tips to help them respond safely and effectively to incidents of online harassment and hateful speech. PEN America also leads workshops to equip writers, journalists, and all those active online with tools and tactics to defend against hateful speech and trolling.

== Controversies ==
=== War in Gaza ===
Several authors requested that their names be removed from PEN referring to dissatisfaction with the organization's position regarding the Gaza war; among them were Camonghne Felix, nominated for the Jean Stein award, Eugenia Leigh, a poetry finalist and Ghassan Zeineddine, nominated for a short story. A letter signed by Naomi Klein, Lorrie Moore, and dozens of others protested that PEN had not “launched any substantial coordinated support” for Palestinians.

Chris Hedges reports in his The Chris Hedges Report website in March 2024, "[PEN's] refusal to condemn the deaths in Gaza and Israel’s targeted killings of writers, academics and journalists, has seen numerous writers withdraw from the annual PEN World Voices Festival in New York and Los Angeles, scheduled for April and May." PEN America canceled the 2024 World Voices festival and Literary Awards after 28 of the 61 nominated authors withdrew their books from consideration in the annual ceremony as they condemned the organization for failing to strongly condemn the genocide in Palestine.

The organization spoke out on a wide range of topics related to the war and its reverberations for free expression and pledged significant support to Palestinian writers, including a dedicated fund initially set at $100,000, to be administered by the PEN Emergency Fund, to support writers affected by the war. In September 2025, it released its report All That Is Lost: The Cultural Destruction of Gaza, which condemned the Gaza genocide.

In October 2024, longtime CEO Suzanne Nossel announced that she would take a new position, and the organization appointed Summer Lopez and Clarisse Rosaz Shariyf as interim co-CEOs. Writers Against the War on Gaza took credit for her departure, saying in a statement that "Nossel lost her job because her commitment to Zionism made her a liability to PEN America."

In 2026, the president of PEN America, Dinaw Mengestu, resigned in protest of a report on boycotts targeting Jewish and Israeli authors. In its report, published on its blog, PEN described “Jewish and Israeli writers who feel that the mainstream literary world is increasingly shutting them out because of their identity, nationality, or views". The writers "reported event disinvitations and cancellations, and new and growing barriers to publication. They also recounted being harassed on social media, review-bombed on Goodreads, and subjected to online calls not to be read, platformed, or engaged with if they had ever shown support for Israel or Zionism. Some writers described being ignored by agents, publishers, literary journals, and magazines. Many requested anonymity to protect their safety and careers."

=== Labor ===
Alex N. Press reports in Jacobin, May 1, 2024, "'PEN America management’s recent actions reflect what is becoming an appalling pattern of blatant disrespect towards its unionized staff,' said the union in a statement." And "The union has also filed two unfair labor practices (ULP) against PEN America with the National Labor Relations Board (NLRB). The ULPs concern workers’ just-cause and labor-management committee proposals: workers say the company engaged in 'regressive bargaining' with both proposals, meaning they offered less than they had previously, after bringing on Tanya Khan from Kauff McGuire & Margolis, a union-busting law firm, late last year."

The following month, PEN America reached an agreement with its union.

== See also ==
- PEN International
- English PEN
- PEN Center USA
- PEN Canada
- Sydney PEN
- PEN Open Book Award
- PEN World Voices
