= Eye Level (poetry collection) =

2018 debut poetry collection by Jenny Xie

Eye Level: Poems
- Author: Jenny Xie
- Publisher: Graywolf Press
- Publication date: April 3, 2018
- Pages: 80
- Awards: Walt Whitman Award; Holmes Poetry Prize; Levis Reading Prize
- ISBN: 978-1555978020
- Followed by: The Rupture Tense

Eye Level: Poems is a 2018 debut poetry collection by Jenny Xie. It was published by Graywolf Press after Juan Felipe Herrera selected Xie's manuscript for the Walt Whitman Award in 2017. After publication, the book was nominated for several awards and won a few prizes including the Levis Reading Prize.

== Content ==
The book follows a speaker and their travels through the world as they arrive in destinations like Phnom Penh, Hanoi, and Corfu. The poem's themes include selfhood; isolation; borders; and racial, ethnic, and national identities, among others.

== Critical reception ==
The book won the 22nd Levis Reading Prize and the Holmes Poetry Prize. The book also was a finalist for the National Book Award for Poetry and the PEN Open Book Award.

Publishers Weekly said "The work exhibits much promise conceptually and is rife with feelings of loneliness, disorientation, desire, and complicity" but observed that "Yet, rather than build tension and a sense of urgency, the observations continue to multiply as the speaker disappears among the work's shifting perspectives."

Some critics lauded the nature of diaspora and dispossession throughout Xie's poems. The New Yorker analyzed "The ironies of [Xie's] shifting positions, as a Chinese immigrant in America and as a Chinese-American travelling through Asia". The Poetry Project said "Xie's poems travel Cambodia, Southern Europe, China and the US, while, like vagabonds, the people in the poems feel uprooted and excluded from their surroundings" and compared Xie's project to that of Natalie Diaz, Suji Kwock Kim, Cathy Park Hong, and other writers who "have shown that the private is always public for the disenfranchised citizen." Hong Kong Review of Books compared her writing to Ocean Vuong and Hieu Minh Nguyen.

Other critics observed Xie's approach to individual matters of self, observation, and isolation. The Michigan Quarterly Review said "Xie's ability to invite us along, witness to both beauty and mystery, is astonishing. At times she keeps her distance, but rightfully so. After all, we're inside her world because she has invited us, not because, as a poet, it's required." The Manchester Review concluded "there is a fine, 'crystalline' quality to the poems in Eye Level; both the realism and the mysticism of its themes and music feel warm and achieved." Heavy Feather Review wrote that "Eye Level is refreshing and restorative, spiritual and physical, as great art is. Xie writes into and out from the heart of things. Xie makes the messy look easy, like a light wash." Blackbird said "Whether because of its vivid imagery, sustained meditations, or deft language making, Eye Level continues to resonate well after one finishes the book". Tupelo Quarterly wrote that the book "reveals the prowess of a new contemporary literary great."

The Millions mentioned the book in a list of must-read poetry in April 2018.
