= Suki Kim =

Korean American journalist and writer

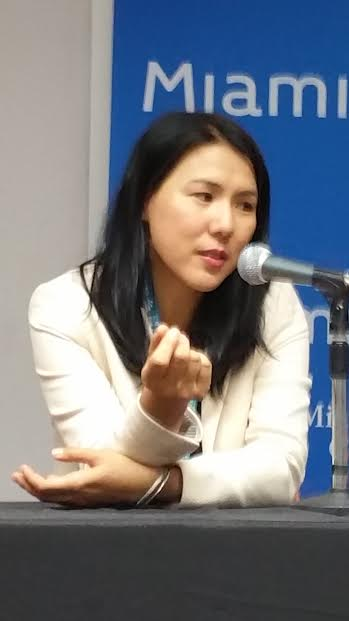
- At Miami Book Fair International, Nov. 2015
- Born: 1970 (age 55–56); Seoul, South Korea
- Education: Barnard College
- Writing career
- Genres: novel, essay
- Notable works: The Interpreter, Without You, There is No Us
- Notable awards: PEN Beyond Margins Award; Gustavus Myers Outstanding Book Award
- Website: SukiKim.com

Suki Kim (born 1970) is a Korean American journalist and writer. She is the author of the novel The Interpreter and the book Without You, There Is No Us: Undercover Among the Sons of North Korea's Elite, about her time teaching English in Pyongyang. Kim is the only writer to have lived undercover in North Korea to conduct immersive journalism. She is a contributing editor at The New Republic.

== Early life ==
Kim was born in Seoul, South Korea, and immigrated to the United States with her family at thirteen. She is a naturalized American citizen.

Kim graduated from Barnard College with a Bachelor of Arts degree in English. Kim also studied East Asian Literature at the School of Oriental and African Studies in London. She has received a Fulbright Research Grant, a Guggenheim Fellowship, and an Open Society Foundations Fellowship. Kim was also a Ferris Journalism Fellow at Princeton University, where she was a visiting lecturer.

== Work ==
=== The Interpreter ===
Kim's debut novel, The Interpreter, published by Farrar, Straus & Giroux in 2003, is a murder mystery about a young Korean-American woman, Suzy Park, living in New York City and searching for answers as to why her shopkeeper parents were murdered. To search the novel, Kim took a job as an interpreter in New York City.l The book received positive reviews and won several awards. The Interpreter was translated into Dutch, French, Korean, Italian, and Japanese.

=== North Korea ===
Kim visited North Korea in February 2002 to participate in the 60th birthday celebration of Kim Jong-il. She documented this experience in a February 2003 cover essay for The New York Review of Books.

Kim accompanied the New York Philharmonic in February 2008, when they traveled to Pyongyang for the historical cultural visit to North Korea from the United States. Her article, "A Really Big Show: The New York Philharmonic's fantasia in North Korea", was published in Harper's Magazine in December 2008.

Kim's second book, Without You, There Is No Us: Undercover Among the Sons of North Korea's Elite, documents her three and a half months in Pyongyang, where she taught English at the Pyongyang University of Science and Technology in 2011. Kim posed as a Christian, as the university is largely funded by Christian evangelicals, and secretly took notes. She obscured the identities of her students to protect them from the authorities. The staff accused Kim of falsely claiming they were missionaries, which Kim dismissed, saying their long-term goal was to convert North Koreans to Christianity.

In a 2016 essay in The New Republic, Kim wrote that she had been criticized for using deception to enter North Korea and accused of endangering her students, lying about her experience or for writing the book for profit. She disagreed with the publisher's marketing of Without You, There Is No Us as a memoir, as it was taken less seriously as a work of investigative journalism. She argued that coverage of North Korea was colored by orientalism as it was dominated by the work of white authors who had only entered North Korea on supervised tours.

=== Later work ===
In 2017, Suki Kim broke a sexual harassment scandal against the journalist John Hockenberry at WNYC in an article in The Cut. Her investigation led to the firing of two longterm WNYC hosts, Leonard Lopate and Jonathan Schwartz, and the resignation of its CEO, Laura Walker, and Chief Content officer, Dean Cappello. Her article was voted the Best Investigative Reporting of 2017 by Longreads.

In 2020, Kim published an investigative feature in The New Yorker on Free Joseon, a group that has declared itself a provisional government for North Korea. She was the first to interview the group's leader, Adrian Hong, while he was on the run from the Department of Justice.

== Bibliography ==
=== Books ===
Year	Title
2003	The Interpreter
2014	Without You, There Is No Us; My Time with the Sons of North Korea's Elite

=== Anthologies ===
Year	Title	Ref
2005	New York Stories: The Best of the City Section of the New York Times	
2017	The Moth Presents All These Wonders	
2018	The Best American Essays 2018	

=== Essays and op-eds ===
==== About North Korea and South Korea ====
Year	Title	Publication	Ref
2003	A Visit to North Korea	The New York Review of Books	
2003	Korea's New Wave	The New York Times	
2003	Strange Centennial	The Boston Globe	
2005	Die Ahnen und die Wasser (The Anticipation of the Water)	Neue Zurcher Zeitung	
2005	Hwang, Drawn and Quartered?	The Wall Street Journal	
2006	Great Leadership	The Wall Street Journal	
2007	Asia's Apostles	The Washington Post	
2007	Globalizing Grief	The Wall Street Journal	
2008	A Really Big Show: The New York Philharmonic’s Fantasia in North Korea	Harper's	
2009	Notes from Another Credit Card Crisis	The New York Times	
2010	The System of Defecting	Harper's	
2010	North Korean Fans Attend the World Cup	Newsweek	
2013	The Shared Wound in Korea	The New York Times	
2013	The Dear Leader's Heinous Act	The New York Times	
2014	The Good Student in North Korea	The New York Times Magazine	
2014	My Time at an Elite Pyongyang Boarding School	Foreign Affairs	
2014	Teaching Essay Writing in Pyongyang	Slate	
2014	The Sony Hack Is North Korea's Biggest Victory in a Long Time	Slate	
2014	Dear Leader's Great Victory	The National Post	
2014	The Secret Shame of North Korea's Slave Workers	Newsweek	
2015	What ‘The Interview’ Gets Right and Wrong about US Policy Toward North Korea	The Nation	
2016	Is it Time to Intervene in North Korea?	The New Republic	
2016	Republic of Disappointment.	Slate	
2016	Across the Broken Bridge	The New Republic	
2016	Korean Reporters Got Fired, Got Active, and Got The President	Foreign Policy	
2017	The Meaning of Kim Jong Nam's Murder	The Atlantic	
2017	An Extraordinary Statement from a North Korean Prince	The New Yorker	
2017	Is Christian Evangelicals’ Money Helping to Prop Up North Korea’s Regime?	The Washington Post	
2017	Tourism to North Korea isn’t about engagement. It’s torture porn.	The Washington Post	
2017	My two messed-up countries: an immigrant’s dilemma	The Guardian	
2017	South Korea Is More Worried About Donald Trump Than Kim Jong Un	Foreign Policy	
2018	The Dealmaker	The New Republic	
2018	Covering the North Korea Summit While Trapped in a Warehouse in Singapore	The New Yorker	
2018	North Korea’s Lipstick Diplomacy	The New York Times	
2020	How South Korea Lost Control of Its Coronavirus Outbreak	The New Yorker	
2020	The Underground Movement Trying To Topple the North Korean Regime	The New Yorker	

==== Other work ====
Year	Title	Publication	Ref
2003	Translating Poverty and Pain	The New York Times	
2003	Marriage of Inconvenience?	The New York Times	
2003	North Ride Home	Gourmet	
2004	Facing Poverty with a Rich Girl's Habits	The New York Times	
2006	Our Affair Was One Long Lesson in How to Break Up	The New York Times	
2010	Forced from Home and Yet Never Free of it	The New York Times	
2015	Love Stories: Why I Flew to Beijing in Search of the Perfect Dress	Vogue	
2016	Mr Rubio's Neighborhood	The New Republic	
2016	The Reluctant Memoirist	The New Republic	
2016	What Happened in Brisbane	The New Republic	
2017	Land of Darkness	Lapham's Quarterly	
2017	Public-Radio Icon John Hockenberry Accused of Harassing Female Colleagues	The Cut	

== Awards ==
Year	Title	Notes	Ref
2003	Gustavus Myers Outstanding Book Award	The Interpreter, winner	
2004	Ernest Hemingway Foundation Award	The Interpreter, nominee	
2004	PEN Openbook Award	The Interpreter, winner	
2019	Berlin Prize	Winner	

== Fellowships ==
Year	Title	Ref
1998	Millay Colony for the Arts	
1998	Ucross Foundation	
1999	Ragdale Foundation	
1999	The Edward F. Albee Foundation Fellowship	
2001	MacDowell Fellowship	
2002	MacDowell Fellowship	
2003	MacDowell Fellowship	
2003	Santa Maddalena Foundation Fellowship	
2005	Ucross Foundation	
2006	Guggenheim Fellowship	
2006	MacDowell Fellowship	
2007	Bogliasco Foundation Fellowship	
2010	MacDowell Fellowship	
2012	George Soros's Open Society Foundations Fellowship	
2014	New York Foundation for the Arts Fellowship	
2017	Ferris Journalism Fellowship at Princeton University	
2018	Ucross Foundation	
2019	Arizona State University's Center on the Future of War Fellowship	
2019	New America Foundation Fellowship	
2019	MacDowell Fellowship	
2020	Schloss Wiepersdorf Fellowship	

== See also ==
- List of Asian American writers
