= The Grave on the Wall =

2019 memoir by Brandon Shimoda

- Author: Brandon Shimoda
- Publisher: City Lights
- Publication date: July 30, 2019
- Pages: 222
- Awards: PEN Open Book Award
- ISBN: 978-0872867901
- Preceded by: The Desert
- Followed by: Hydra Medusa

The Grave on the Wall is a 2019 memoir by Brandon Shimoda, published by City Lights. It won the PEN Open Book Award.

== Content ==
The book follows Shimoda's journeys through Japan after his grandfather, Midori Shimoda, passed away. Shimoda said it's ultimately "a book of people, plants, and ghosts (among other things). They are the books inhabitants, and are equal to each other." Shimoda also stated that the book's writing happened concurrently to the writing of the poems in Evening Oracle; he said working through his experiences in Japan through poetry first helped him access the same ideas in prose later. In The Adroit Journal, Shimoda stated that the nature of the book transformed as Shimoda experienced more and met more people abroad:

"Instead of being about my grandfather, the book is about what happens when you try to write a book about something. What happens is that, if you’re lucky, you enter into all these social relationships that fill in the subject that become surrogates of the subject and then, in a way, make that subject more transcendent because it makes it about these living relationships, these living engagements."

With the inclusion of images, the book makes direct references to works by Akira Kurosawa and Theresa Hak Kyung Cha. It also interrogates an FBI file regarding Shimoda's grandfather which his aunt, Risa, shared with him: "It is less a compilation of facts about my grandfather, and more a compilation of the ways the FBI (therefore the U.S.) shined a light through my grandfather’s body and life and into the abyss of its own demented subconsciousness."

== Critical reception ==
Kirkus Reviews called the book "A memoir of sorts that blurs the boundary between the personal and the universal" and observed Shimoda's skillful weaving of his family history starting with the immigration of Shimoda's grandfather, Midori Shimoda, from Japan to Seattle, as well as his later incarceration during World War II.

Los Angeles Review observed Shimoda's inherent critique against memorialization, instead pointing out that "His collaging of the historical document with the personal, the folkloric, and the frustrating silences and absences he faces along the way, creates a text that pushes against commemoration." The reviewer also lauded Shimoda's ability to harness poetry from film stills pulled from Kurosawa and Cha.

Full Stop applauded Shimoda's decision to write prose, stating his prose work still possessed the inquisitive explorations into death and memory as his poetry. The reviewer stated: "The Grave among other things reads as a feat to me, as if something truly massive were fit into two hundred pages, without compromise or shortcut or disassembly or surgery."
