= Naeem Murr =

British writer (born 1965)

Naeem Murr (born March 1965) is a British-born novelist and short story writer of Irish and Palestinian descent. He is the author of four novels acclaimed for their dark portraiture and stark, original prose. He currently lives in Chicago with his wife, poet Averill Curdy .

== Biography ==
Born in London, Murr moved to the United States in his early twenties and has been a writer-in-residence at numerous universities, including Western Michigan University, the University of Missouri, and Northwestern University and was a Stanford University Creative Writing Fellow. His first novel, The Boy, concerns a father's search for a strange orphan he adopted into his family who has fled to live in a slum as a prostitute. It was a New York Times Notable Book. A second novel, The Genius of the Sea, explores the fears and failures of a social-worker coming to terms with his life by talking with a man who now occupies his dead mother's apartment. His third novel, The Perfect Man was published in 2007 to critical acclaim. The novel was awarded The Commonwealth Writers' Prize for the Best Book of Europe/South Asia, and was long-listed for the Man Booker Prize. Set in the 1950s, The Perfect Man details the life of an unwanted boy sent first from India to London, and then to small-town Missouri, and the complex web of relationships he develops as he matures.

His most recent novel is "Every Exit Brings You Home," published by Norton in 2026.

Murr has received many awards for his writing, including a Lambda Literary Award, a Lannan Residency Fellowship, a Guggenheim Fellowship, a PEN Beyond Margins Award and a Stegner Fellowship.

== Bibliography ==
- The Boy (1998)
- The Genius of the Sea (2003)
- The Perfect Man (2007) (UK publication in 2006)
- Every Exit Brings You Home (2026)
