= Jenny Xie =

American poet and educator

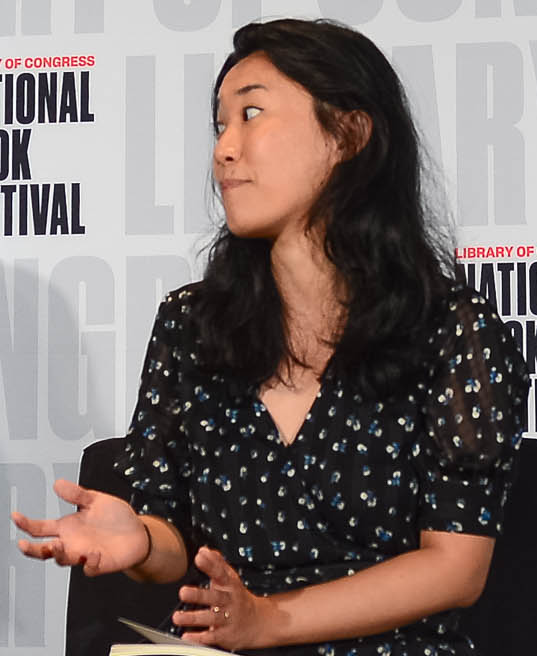
- Xie at the 2019 National Book Festival
- Born: Hefei, Anhui, China
- Education: Princeton University; New York University
- Occupations: Poet, teacher
- Writing career
- Notable work: Eye Level
- Notable awards: Walt Whitman award (2018), Vilcek Prize for Creative Promise in Literature (2020)
- Website: jennymxie.com

Jenny Xie is an American poet and educator. She is the author of Eye Level, winner of the 2018 Walt Whitman Award of the Academy of American Poets and a finalist for the National Book Award in 2018, and of The Rupture Tense, a finalist for the National Book Award in 2022.

== Biography ==
Jenny Xie was born in Anhui, China. She was raised in North Brunswick, New Jersey, and graduated from North Brunswick Township High School. She received an undergraduate degree at Princeton University and earned a graduate degree from New York University. Xie's chapbook, Nowhere to Arrive, was published by Northwestern University Press in 2017 and won the 2016 Drinking Gourd Chapbook Poetry Prize.

Xie's poetry collection, Eye Level, was published by Graywolf Press in 2018. Xie was named winner of the Walt Whitman award given by the Academy of American Poets in 2018. The book was also named a finalist for the National Book Award for Poetry in 2018. In June 2018, Xie was named winner of the Holmes National Poetry Prize, as a "poet of special merit", selected by the Creative Writing faculty of Princeton University.

Xie was awarded a Vilcek Prize for Creative Promise in Literature by the Vilcek Foundation in 2020.

Xie's second poetry collection, The Rupture Tense, was published by Graywolf Press in 2022. The Rupture Tense was a finalist for the National Book Award for Poetry in 2022.

Xie lives in New York City. She teaches at Bard College and previously taught at New York University.

== Awards ==
- Winner of the Walt Whitman award, Eye Level, (2017)
- Shortlisted for the 2018 National Book Award for Eye Level
- Winner of the 2016 Drinking Gourd Chapbook Poetry Prize
- Winner of the Holmes National Poetry Prize in 2018
- Longlisted for the 2019 Dylan Thomas Prize for Eye Level
- Shortlisted for the 2019 PEN Open Book Award for Eye Level
- 2020 Vilcek Prize for Creative Promise in Literature
- Shortlisted for the 2022 National Book Award for The Rupture Tense
- Winner of a 2023 PEN Oakland/Josephine Miles Literary Award for The Rupture Tense.
