= The Interpreter (Kim novel) =

2003 novel by Suki Kim

- Author: Suki Kim
- Language: English
- Genre: Novel
- Publisher: Farrar, Straus & Giroux
- Publication date: 2003
- Publication place: United States
- Media type: Print (Paperback)
- Pages: 464 pp (first edition, paperback)
- ISBN: 978-0-312-42224-0
- OCLC: 606927844

The Interpreter is a 2003 murder mystery novel by Suki Kim. A twenty-nine-year-old Korean American court interpreter, Suzy Park, is startled to discover during a case that her parents' homicide was not random.

== Summary ==
Korean American Suzy Park works as a court interpreter for the New York City courts. She has had two rocky relationships with married men, worked a series of unsatisfying jobs, and cut ties with her family before her parents were shot in an unsolved double murder. During a court case, she discovers that her parents were not murdered by random violence, as the police had indicated, but instead had been shot by political enemies. The discovery motivates Park to investigate what really happened.

== Awards and nomination ==
- PEN/Beyond Margins Award
- Gustavus Myers Outstanding Book Award
- Runner-up for the PEN/Hemingway Prize

== Translations ==
- Dutch: Thera Idema [translator] (2003), De tolk, Amsterdam: Contact, ISBN 978-90-254-1446-7, OCLC 66763484
- French: Marie Boudewyn [translator] (2004), L'interprète : roman, Paris: Calmann-Lévy, ISBN 978-2-7021-3495-5, OCLC 470148483
- Korean: Yi Eum-seon [이은선, translator] (2005), 통역사 [Tongyeoksa], 황금가지 [Hwanggeum Gaji], ISBN 978-89-8273-635-3, OCLC 62162491
- Japanese: Kunishige Junji [國重純二, translator] (2007), Tsūyaku/Intāpuritā 通訳/インタープリター, 英社 [Shūeisha], ISBN 978-4-08-773414-0, OCLC 675929390

== Sources ==
- Interview: Suki Kim and the Interpreter
