= Jennifer Foerster =

Native American poet from California

- Born: Jennifer Elise Foerster
- Citizenship: Muscogee (Creek) Nation • American
- Education: Institute of American Indian Arts (BFA), Vermont College of Fine Arts (MFA), University of Denver (PhD)
- Writing career
- Genre: Poetry
- Notable work: Leaving Tulsa (2013)
- Website: jenniferfoerster.com

Jennifer Elise Foerster is a poet, writer, and teacher based in San Francisco, California. She has published three poetry books and served as associate editor for When the Light of the World Was Subdued Our Songs Came Through, A Norton Anthology of Native Nations Poetry (2020) and co-editor of Janice Gould: A Record of a Poet Becoming (2026), and has been published in numerous journal publications and anthologies. Her 2013 book Leaving Tulsa was a finalist for the shortlist of the 2014 PEN Open Book Award.

== Early life and family ==
Foerster's father was in the U.S. Air Force, so she grew up living in many cities in the U.S. and Europe. Foerster is an enrolled citizen of the Muscogee Nation, a federally recognized Native American tribe based in Oklahoma. In addition to her Mvskoke relatives, she is of German and Dutch heritage.

== Education ==
Foerster earned her Bachelor of Fine Arts from the Institute of American Indian Arts, Master of Fine Arts from Vermont College of Fine Arts, and PhD in Literary Arts from the University of Denver. She also has received fellowships, including the NEA Creative Writing Fellowship (2017), a Lannan Foundation Writing Residency Fellowship (2014), a Robert Frost Fellow in Poetry at Breadloaf (2017), a Wallace Stegner Fellow in Poetry at Stanford (2008–2010), and is a recipient of a 2026 Grants for Artists Award in Poetry from the Foundation for Contemporary Arts.

== Works ==
Her poetry works are:

- Leaving Tulsa (University of Arizona Press, 2013)
- Bright Raft in the Afterweather (University of Arizona Press, 2018)
- The Maybe-Bird (The Song Cave, 2022)
