= Insurrecto =

2018 Philippine novel by Gina Apostol

- First edition
- Author: Gina Apostol
- Language: English
- Publisher: Soho Press
- Publication date: November 15, 2018
- Media type: Print (hardback & paperback)
- Pages: 336 pp.
- ISBN: 978-1-61695-945-6
- Preceded by: Gun Dealer's Daughter
- Followed by: La Tercera

Insurrecto is a 2018 Philippine novel published by Gina Apostol. It explores an incident in Balangiga, Eastern Samar in 1901, when Filipino revolutionaries attacked an American garrison, the role of Casiana Nacionales, and the retaliation of the American soldiers, which created a "howling wilderness" of the surrounding countryside. It was shortlisted for the 2019 Dayton Literary Peace Prize.

== Synopsis ==
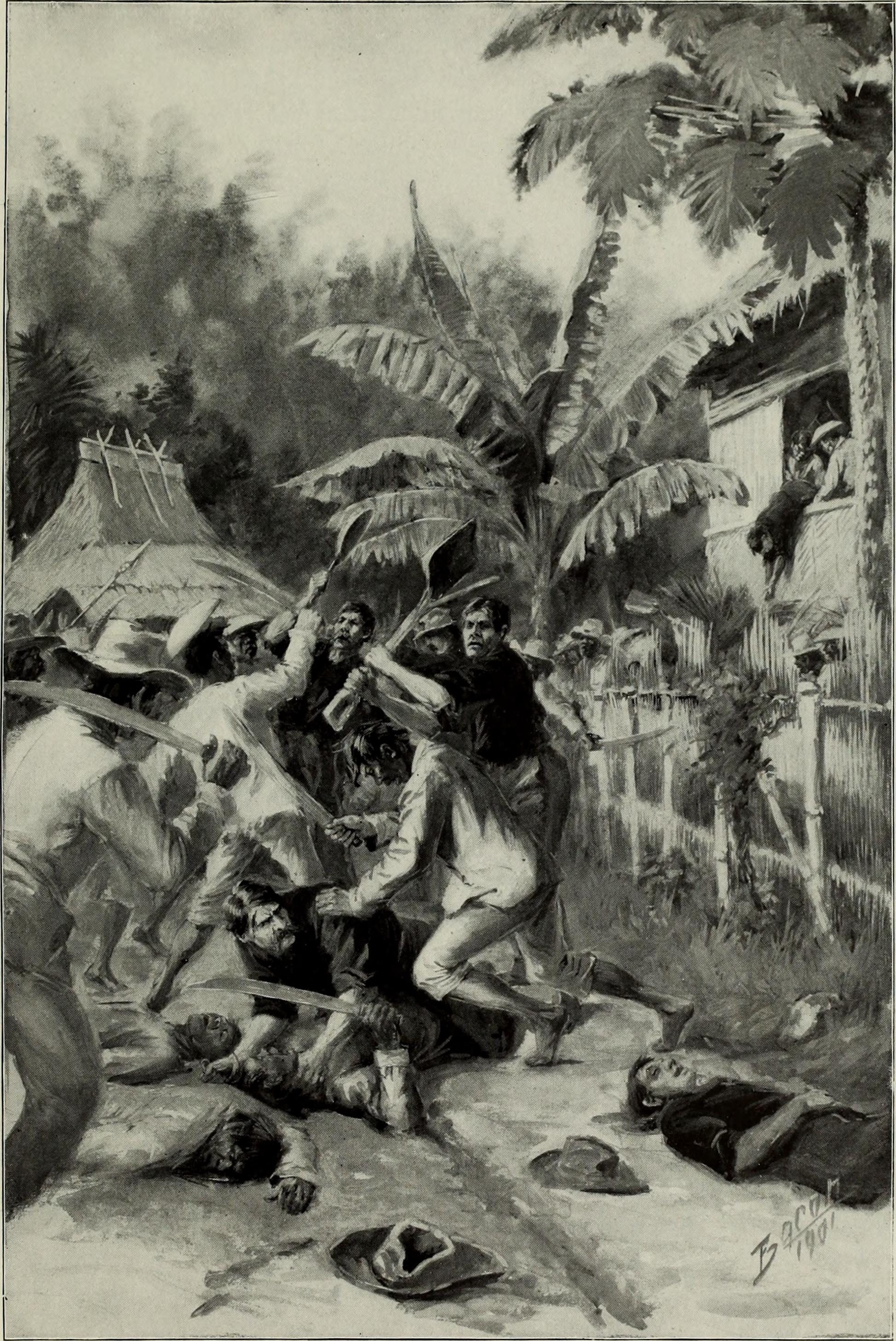
The novel heavily explores the dramas of the historic Balangiga massacre.

While traveling around the Philippines under Duterte's regime, two women — Magsalin, a Filipino translator, and Chiara, an American filmmaker — collaborate and argue over a screenplay they are writing about a massacre that occurred during the Philippine-American War. Chiara is producing a movie on the 1901 events in Balangiga, Samar, where Filipino revolutionaries stormed an American post and American forces turned the surrounding region into "a howling wilderness" in response. After reading Chiara's screenplay, Magsalin drafts her own adaptation. Two competing scripts — one about a white photographer and the other about a Filipino schoolteacher — that the director and translator worked on are included into the dramatic action of Insurrecto.

== Reviews ==
It received starred reviews from Booklist and Publishers Weekly.

Publishers Weekly called the novel "complex and aptly vertiginous" and highlighted how it "deconstructs how humans tell stories and decide which versions of events are remembered". Similarly, Kirkus Reviews concluded that the novel includes "dazzling, interlocking narratives on history, truth, and storytelling." Malaysian writer Tash Aw shared his review in The Guardian, calling the novel a "thrillingly imagined and provocative inquiry into the nature of stories and the unfolding of history in our collective consciousness". Aw noted that while Insurrecto "is tackling the issue of cultural appropriation, [...] it never ventures close to anything like a crass attempt at resolution, instead using the complexity of its narrative and thematic structure to hint at the difficulty in understanding the confluence of history, power and the individual."

Multiple reviewers discussed Apostol's writing style in both praising and criticizing manners. According to Publishers Weekly, the "layers of narrative, pop culture references, and blurring of history and fiction make for a profound and unforgettable journey into the past and present of the Philippines." Booklist's Terry Hong indicated that the novel's "multilayered challenge, enhanced by the presences of Elvis, Muhammad Ali, various Coppolas, and a sprawling cast of characters both historical and imagined, proves exceptionally rewarding". Jen McDonald, writing for The New York Times, referred to Apostol as "a magician with language", comparing her skill to Jorge Luis Borges and Vladimir Nabokov as she "can swing from slang and mockery to the stodgy argot of critical theory. She puns with gusto, potently and unabashedly, until one begins reading double meanings, allusions and ulterior motives into everything." Given some of the novel's complexity, Kirkus Reviews recommended revisiting "the cast of characters and the out-of-order system of numbering chapters [...] after finishing the book". The Financial Times's Nilanjana Roy argued that if the novel had been "told conventionally, Insurrecto might have easily won readers over". Comparing Apostol's writing to Borges and Julio Cortázar, Roy highlighted how Apostol "expect[s] the reader to trust her as the story hopscotches through time and space", which can be "destabilizing". She concluded, however, that "for readers accustomed to the jump-cuts and montages of cinema, Insurrecto doesn't present a challenge so much as a cascade of pleasures and possibilities ... Perhaps Insurrecto’s greatest weakness is that it is too much of a polemical argument, but when it returns to what you can experience, it has much to offer."

Tadzio Koelb, writing for The Times Literary Supplement, found that the novel's shifts between historical events, including historical figures, and fiction caused friction in the narrative. He found the novel's dialogue to be "unnatural, [...] presumably because character here is entirely subservient to plot: it is not personal psychology that drives events, it is history. The Balangiga massacre happened and therefore will happen, has already killed whomever Apostol/Chiara/Magsalin might invent. This prolepsis extends to all the novel's characters." Koelb concluded, "The game-playing that makes up so much of Insurrecto suggests that Apostol trusts Brechtian alienation to force readers into a rational critical stance. But highlighting fictionality in these many ways is risky. It is an approach that threatens to undermine – and in Apostol's hands indeed does undermine – the one vital truth at the heart of the story: the injustice of the massacre in Balangiga."
