= Evening Oracle =

2015 poetry collection by Brandon Shimoda

- Author: Brandon Shimoda
- Publisher: Letter Machine Editions
- Publication date: October 1, 2015
- Pages: 148
- Awards: William Carlos Williams Award
- ISBN: 978-0988713758
- Preceded by: Portuguese
- Followed by: The Desert

Evening Oracle is a 2015 poetry collection by Brandon Shimoda, published by Letter Machine Editions. It won the William Carlos Williams Award.

== Contents and background ==
In three sections, the books contents include a mix of poetry as well as prose, in the form of letters from Shimoda to others; Shimoda's pieces address themes like death, specifically the death of Shimoda's grandfather, Midori Shimoda. Shimoda stated that he began all of his book's poems in Japan from 2011 to 2012, later writing and revising them over the course of two years. The title comes from a poem by Prince Niu.

== Critical reception ==
The Colorado Review observed the center of gravity in the book through its "large blocks of prose—personal communications to and from friends, family, other poets and artists", among them Etel Adnan and Mary Ruefle. The reviewer specifically pointed out their utility in exposing broader questions of aging, elders, family, and the divide between life and death which permeates much of Shimoda's work as a whole. Ultimately, the reviewer stated that through Shimoda's poems which are themselves liminal, "We see the largeness that extends from any one human life."

Full Stop called the book "beautiful ... elegantly wandering but not lost" and observed the book's mysterious, cryptic qualities, likely due to its writing "in the hazy-blue hours before sleep". The reviewer stated the book was certainly in conversation with O Bon, Shimoda's previous poetry collection, and lauded Shimoda's questioning: "How do we find family—how do we know family—we've only met in stories and genetics? How are we part of a lineage when we are writers, traveling without biological children but holding deep love anyway?"

Cha similarly observed Shimoda's "mode of bedtime writing—he casts a dreamy gauze over a poem's emotional centre, obscures the view by eschewing punctuation and mixing vague language and syntax among his concrete images." The reviewer also saw Shimoda's unique relationship to death: "This collection too feels obliquely elegiac. It enacts or performs a protestation common to elegy—that of the recognition that death is ineffable, and that the inexpressibility of the depth of one's sincerity makes elegy often seem trite to its writer."
