= Surgical Outcomes Analysis and Research =

Medical research program

Surgical Outcomes Analysis & Research (SOAR)
- Type: Research
- Founded: Worcester, Massachusetts, 2007
- Founder: Jennifer F. Tseng, MD, MPH
- Headquarters: Boston, Massachusetts, United States
- Key people: Jennifer F. Tseng MD, MPH (Co-Director)

Surgical Outcomes Analysis & Research, SOAR, is a research laboratory of the Department of Surgery at Boston University School of Medicine and Boston Medical Center with expertise in outcomes research. SOAR investigates surgical diseases and perioperative outcomes. The group focuses on pancreatic cancer, other gastrointestinal and hepatobiliary malignancies, vascular disease, and transplant surgery. SOAR's goal is to examine quality, delivery, and financing of care in order to have an immediate impact on patient care and system improvements. The group members utilize national health services and administrative databases, as well as institutional databases, to investigate and to address factors contributing to disease outcomes and healthcare disparities.

The work in SOAR incorporates advanced statistical techniques, including logistic regression, prediction score, and decision analysis modeling.

== About Outcomes Research ==
Outcomes Research evaluates the impact of health care on the health outcomes of patients and populations. This research may also include the evaluation of economic impacts linked to health outcomes, such as cost effectiveness and cost utility. An emphasis is placed on disease-oriented evaluations of care delivered in general, real-world settings. There are a wide range of outcomes to study including mortality, morbidity, functional status, mental well-being, and other aspects of health-related quality of life. Outcomes research is a multidisciplinary field of inquiry that examines the use, quality, delivery, and financing of health care services to increase knowledge and understanding of the structure, processes, and effects of health services for individuals and populations. Outcomes research provides the data to help solve critical problems that are faced in everyday clinical practice. The information learned can have an immediate impact on patient care and system improvement.

== About SOAR ==
SOAR was founded in 2007 at UMass Medical School and relocated to Beth Israel Deaconess Medical Center and Harvard Medical School, Boston, Massachusetts, in 2012.

The mission of SOAR is to decrease perioperative morbidity and mortality, address health care disparities, and increase overall patient survival and quality of life. SOAR members hope, as part of the surgical outcomes research community, to improve overall outcomes for patients with surgical diseases.

=== Research Goals ===
- Pancreatic cancer and pancreatic disease
- Other gastrointestinal and hepatobiliary malignancies
- Vascular disease
- Transplant surgery and transplant psychology
- Investigating factors that affect surgical outcomes for diverse specialties including colorectal, cardiovascular, transplant, plastic and reconstructive, and minimally invasive surgery

=== About Boston Medical Center ===
Boston Medical Center (BMC) in Boston, Massachusetts is a teaching hospital of Boston University School of Medicine. Situated in Boston's South End neighborhood, BMC is the largest safety-net hospital in New England and caters to a diverse patient population from around the world.

== Ongoing Research ==
SOAR researchers use national health services and administrative databases as well as prospective institutional tissue-linked databases to investigate factors contributing to disease outcomes for pancreatic cancer, hepato biliary disease, vascular disease, colorectal disease, plastic and reconstructive surgery, and transplant medicine. These projects are under development with the use of the following databases:

- AHRQ Nationwide Inpatient Sample (NIS)
- National Surgical Quality Improvement Program (NSQIP)
- Surveillance, Epidemiology, and End Results (SEER)
- SEER Medicare
- National Cancer Database

Additionally, individual research groups have access to and have expertise in disease- and specialty-specific databases. These include:

- Vascular Study Group of New England (VSGNE), a regional vascular surgery database.
- Vascular Quality Initiative (VQI), a national vascular surgery database.
- American Society of Thoracic Surgery (ASTS) database
- National Trauma Data Bank (NTDB)
- Scientific Registry of Transplant Recipients

Also, SOAR researchers are conducting patient-centered outcomes research designed to:

- Measure health-related, functional, and other outcomes from the perspective of patients and their families
- Develop decision aid tools and strategies to assist patients in making complex choices about their healthcare
- Compare the effectiveness of surgical interventions on patient-reported outcomes

== Personnel ==
- Jennifer F. Tseng, MD, MPH - SOAR Founder and Co-Director; Surgeon-in-Chief, Boston Medical Center; James Utley Professor and Chair of Surgery, Boston University School of Medicine
- James R. Rodrigue, PhD - SOAR Co-Director; Director, Behavioral Health Services and Research, The Transplant Center, Beth Israel Deaconess Medical Center; Professor, Psychiatry, Harvard Medical School
- Marc L. Schermerhorn, MD - SOAR Co-Director; Chief, Vascular and Endovascular Surgery, Beth Israel Deaconess Medical Center; Associate Professor, Harvard Medical School

== Publications ==
=== Publications 2014 ===
- Arous EJ, McDade TP, Smith JK, Ng SC, Sullivan ME, Zottola RJ, Ranauro PJ, Shah SA, Whalen GF, Tseng JF (Apr 2014). "Electronic medical record: research tool for pancreatic cancer?". J Surg Res. 187 (2): 466–70. doi:10.1016/j.jss.2013.10.036. PMID 24326179.
- Bliss LA, Yang CJ, Chau Z, Ng SC, McFadden DW, Kent TS, Moser AJ, Callery MP, Tseng JF. "Patient selection and the volume effect in pancreatic surgery: unequal benefits? HPB (Oxford) 2014 Jun 6.
- Buck DB, van Herwaarden JA, Schermerhorn ML, Moll FL (Feb 2014). "Endovascular treatment of abdominal aortic aneurysms". Nat Rev Cardiol. 11 (2): 112–23. doi:10.1038/nrcardio.2013.196. PMC 4128641. PMID 24343568.
- Chau Z, West JK, Zhou Z, McDade T, Smith JK, Ng SC, Kent TS, Callery MP, Moser AJ, Tseng JF (Jun 2014). "Rankings versus reality in pancreatic cancer surgery: a real-world comparison". HPB (Oxford). 16 (6): 528–33. doi:10.1111/hpb.12171. PMC 4048074. PMID 24245953.
- Fokkema M, de Borst GJ, Nolan BW, Indes J, Buck DB, Lo RC, Moll FL, Schermerhorn ML (Jan 2014). "Clinical relevance of cranial nerve injury following carotid endarterectomy". Eur J Vasc Endovasc Surg. 47 (1): 2–7. doi:10.1016/j.ejvs.2013.09.022. PMC 4096657. PMID 24157257.
- Fokkema M, de Borst GJ, Nolan BW, Lo RC, Cambria RA, Powell RJ, Moll FL, Schermerhorn ML (Jan 2014). "Carotid stenting versus endarterectomy in patients undergoing reintervention after prior carotid endarterectomy". J Vasc Surg. 59 (1): 8–15. doi:10.1016/j.jvs.2013.06.070. PMC 3852203. PMID 23972527.
- Fokkema M, Hurks R, Curran T, Bensley RP, Hamdan AD, Wyers MC, Moll FL, Schermerhorn ML (Jan 2014). "The impact of the present on admission indicator on the accuracy of administrative data for carotid endarterectomy and stenting". J Vasc Surg. 59 (1): 32–8. doi:10.1016/j.jvs.2013.07.006. PMC 3874266. PMID 23993438.
- Fokkema Margriet; et al. (2014). "Carotid stenting versus endarterectomy in patients undergoing reintervention after prior carotid endarterectomy". Journal of Vascular Surgery. 59 (1): 8–15. doi:10.1016/j.jvs.2013.06.070. PMC 3852203. PMID 23972527.
- Fokkema Margriet; et al. (2014). "The impact of the present on admission indicator on the accuracy of administrative data for carotid endarterectomy and stenting". Journal of Vascular Surgery. 59 (1): 32–38. doi:10.1016/j.jvs.2013.07.006. PMC 3874266. PMID 23993438.
- Gilmore D; et al. (2014). "Endovascular Management of Critical Limb Ischemia in Renal Transplant Patients". Annals of Vascular Surgery. 28 (1): 159–163. doi:10.1016/j.avsg.2012.12.007. PMID 24011817.
- Glazier AK, Heffernan K, Rodrigue JR. "A framework for conducting deceased donor research in the U.S." Transplantation. In Press.
- Kazley AS, Jordan J, Simpson KN, Chavin K, Rodrigue J, Baliga P (2014). "Development and testing of a disease-specific health literacy measure in kidney transplant patients". Prog Transplant. 24 (3): 263–70. doi:10.7182/pit2014958. PMID 25193727. S2CID 207535320.
- LaPointe Rudow D, Hays R, Baliga P, Cohen DJ, Cooper M, Danovitch GM, Dew MA, Gordon EJ, Mandelbrot DA, McGuire S, Milton J, Moore DR, Morgieivich M, Schold JD, Segev DL, Serur D, Steiner RW, Tan JC, Waterman AD, Zavala E, Rodrigue JR. "Consensus Conference on Best Practices in Live Kidney Donation: Recommendations to optimize education, access, and care". Am J Transplant.
- Lo RC, Bensley RP, Dahlberg SE, Matyal R, Hamdan AD, Wyers M, Chaikof EL, Schermerhorn ML (Feb 2014). "Presentation, treatment, and outcome differences between men and women undergoing revascularization or amputation for lower extremity peripheral arterial disease". J Vasc Surg. 59 (2): 409–418. doi:10.1016/j.jvs.2013.07.114. PMC 3946884. PMID 24080134.
- Lo RC, Lu B, Fokkema MT, Conrad M, Patel VI, Fillinger M, Matyal R, Schermerhorn ML (May 2014). "Relative importance of aneurysm diameter and body size for predicting abdominal aortic aneurysm rupture in men and women". J Vasc Surg. 59 (5): 1209–16. doi:10.1016/j.jvs.2013.10.104. PMC 4004688. PMID 24388278.
- Ragulin-Coyne E, Witkowski ER, Chau Z, Wemple D, Ng SC, Santry HP, Shah SA, Tseng JF (Mar 2014). "National trends in pancreaticoduodenal trauma: interventions and outcomes". HPB (Oxford). 16 (3): 275–81. doi:10.1111/hpb.12125. PMC 3945854. PMID 23869407.
- Rodrigue JR, Fleishman A, Vishnevsky T, Whiting J, Vella J, Garrison K, Moore D, Kayler L, Baliga P, Chavin K, Karp S, Mandelbrot DA (2014). "Development and validation of a questionnaire to assess fear of kidney failure following living donation". Transpl. Int. 27 (6): 570–5. doi:10.1111/tri.12299. PMC 4028402. PMID 24606048.
- Rodrigue JR, Paek M, Whiting J, Vella J, Garrison K, Pavlakis M, Mandelbrot DA (2014). "Trajectories of perceived benefits in living kidney donors: Association with donor characteristics and recipient outcomes". Transplantation. 97 (7): 762–8. doi:10.1097/01.tp.0000437560.23588.ef. PMID 24342981. S2CID 12873097.
- Rodrigue JR, Paek M, Egbuna O, Waterman AD, Schold JD, Pavlakis M, Mandelbrot DA (2014). "Readiness of wait-listed black patients to pursue live donor kidney transplantation". Prog Transplant. 24 (4): 355–361. doi:10.7182/pit2014337. PMC 4516085. PMID 25488559.
- Rodrigue JR, Fleishman A, Vishnevsky T, Fitzpatrick S, Boger M (2014). "Organ donation video messaging: Differential appeal, emotional valence, and behavioral intention". Clinical Transplantation. 28 (10): 1184–92. doi:10.1111/ctr.12449. PMID 25125237. S2CID 21256294.
- Rodrigue JR, Fleishman A, Fitzpatrick S, Boger M (2014). "Organ donation knowledge, willingness, and beliefs of motor vehicle clerks". Transplantation. 98 (10): 1025–28. doi:10.1097/tp.0000000000000424. PMID 25222015. S2CID 22705741.
- Rodrigue JR, Paek M, Egbuna O, Waterman AD, Schold JD, Pavlakis M, Mandelbrot DA (2014). "Making house calls increases living donor inquiries and evaluations for blacks on the kidney transplant waiting list". Transplantation. 98 (9): 979–86. doi:10.1097/tp.0000000000000165. PMC 4218873. PMID 24825528.
- Rodrigue JR, Leishman R, Vishnevsky T, Evenson AR, Mandelbrot DA. "Concerns of ABO incompatible and crossmatch-positive potential donors and recipients about participating in kidney exchanges." Clin Transplant. In Press.
- Rodrigue JR, Schold JD, Morrissey J, Whiting J, Vella J, Kayler L, Katz D, Jones J, Kaplan B, Fleishman A, Pavlakis M, Mandelbrot DA. "Pre-donation direct and indirect costs incurred by adults who donated a kidney: Findings from the KDOC study." Am J Transplant. In Press.
- Schold JD, Goldfarb DA, Buccini LD, Rodrigue JR, Mandelbrot DA, Heaphy EL, Fatica R, Poggio ED (2014). "Hospitalizations following living donor nephrectomy in the United States". Clin J Am Soc Nephrol. 9 (2): 355–65. doi:10.2215/CJN.03820413. PMC 3913232. PMID 24458071.
- Schold JD, Buccini LB, Rodrigue JR, Mandelbrot D, Goldfarb DA, Flechner SM, Kayler LK, Poggio ED. "Critical factors associated with missing follow-up data for living kidney donors in the United States." Am J Transplant. In Press.
- Yang CJ, Bliss LA, Schapira EF, Freedman SD, Ng SC, Windsor JA, Tseng JF. "Systematic Review of Early Surgery for Chronic Pancreatitis: Impact on Pain, Pancreatic Function, and Re-intervention. J Gastrointest Surg. 2014 Jun 19.
- Zhang JQ, Curran T, McCallum JC, Wang L, Wyers MC, Hamdan AD, Guzman RJ, Schermerhorn ML (May 2014). "Risk factors for readmission after lower extremity bypass in the American College of Surgeons National Surgery Quality Improvement Program". J Vasc Surg. 59 (5): 1331–9. doi:10.1016/j.jvs.2013.12.032. PMC 4004644. PMID 24491239.

=== Publications 2013 ===
- Arous, Edward J., et al. "Electronic medical record: research tool for pancreatic cancer?." Journal of Surgical Research (2013).
- Bayliss George P, et al. (2013). "Immunosuppression after renal allograft failure: a survey of US practices". Clinical Transplantation. 27 (6): 895–900. doi:10.1111/ctr.12254. PMID 24118389. S2CID 9547616.
- Bensley, Rodney P., et al. "Accuracy of administrative data versus clinical data to evaluate carotid endarterectomy and carotid stenting." Journal of Vascular Surgery (2013).
- Bensley, Rodney P., et al. "Risk of late-onset adhesions and incisional hernia repairs after surgery." Journal of the American College of Surgeons (2013).
- Bensley, Rodney P., et al. "Open repair of intact thoracoabdominal aortic aneurysms in the American College of Surgeons National Surgical Quality Improvement Program." Journal of Vascular Surgery (2013).
- Buck Dominique B., et al. "Endovascular treatment of abdominal aortic aneurysms." National Review of Cardiology (2013).
- Chau, Zeling, et al. "Rankings versus reality in pancreatic cancer surgery: a real‐world comparison." HPB (2013).
- Edwards, Samuel T., et al. "Comparative effectiveness of endovascular versus open repair of ruptured abdominal aortic aneurysm in the Medicare population." Journal of Vascular Surgery (2013).
- Fokkema, M., et al. "Clinical Relevance of Cranial Nerve Injury following Carotid Endarterectomy." European Journal of Vascular and Endovascular Surgery (2013).
- Fokkema, Margriet, et al. "In-hospital vs postdischarge adverse events following carotid endarterectomy." Journal of Vascular Surgery (2013).
- Fokkema, Margriet, et al. "Selective external endarterectomy in patients with ipsilateral symptomatic internal carotid artery occlusion." Journal of Vascular Surgery (2013).
- Glaser JD; et al. (2013). "Fate of the contralateral limb after lower extremity amputation". Journal of Vascular Surgery. 58 (6): 1571–1577. doi:10.1016/j.jvs.2013.06.055. PMC 3844063. PMID 23921246.
- Kalish, Brian T., et al. "Quality Assessment in Pancreatic Surgery: What Might Tomorrow Require?." Journal of Gastrointestinal Surgery 17.1 (2013): 86-93.
- Khoynezhad A., et al. "Results of a multicenter, prospective trial of thoracic endovascular aortic repair for blunt thoracic aortic injury (RESCUE trial)." Journal of Vascular Surgery (2013).
- Lo, Ruby C., et al. "Gender differences in abdominal aortic aneurysm presentation, repair, and mortality in the Vascular Study Group of New England." Journal of Vascular Surgery (2013).
- Lo, Ruby C., et al. "Outcomes following infrapopliteal angioplasty for critical limb ischemia." Journal of Vascular Surgery (2013).
- Lo, Ruby C., et al. "Presentation, treatment, and outcome differences between men and women undergoing revascularization or amputation for lower extremity peripheral arterial disease." Journal of Vascular Surgery (2013).
- Lo Ruby C., et al. "Relative importance of aneurysm diameter and body size for predicting abdominal aortic aneurysm rupture in men and women." Journal of Vascular Surgery (2013).
- Ragulin-Coyne E; et al. (2013). "Is Routine Intraoperative Cholangiogram Necessary in the Twenty-First Century? A National View". Journal of Gastrointestinal Surgery. 17 (3): 434–442. doi:10.1007/s11605-012-2119-8. PMC 4570242. PMID 23292460.
- Ragulin‐Coyne, Elizaveta, et al. "National trends in pancreaticoduodenal trauma: interventions and outcomes." HPB (2013).
- Rodrigue JR, Hanto DW, Curry MP (2013). "Substance abuse treatment and its association with relapse to alcohol use after liver transplantation". Liver Transplantation. 19 (12): 1387–1395. doi:10.1002/lt.23747. PMID 24123780.
- Rodrigue JR, Hanto DW, Curry MP (2013). "The Alcohol Relapse Risk Assessment: a scoring system to predict the risk of relapse to any alcohol use after liver transplant". Progress in Transplantation. 23 (4): 310–318. doi:10.7182/pit2013604. PMID 24311394. S2CID 207535298.
- Rodrigue JR; et al. (2013). "Patient-reported immunosuppression nonadherence 6 to 24 months after liver transplant: association with pretransplant psychosocial factors and perceptions of health status change". Progress in Transplantation. 23 (4): 319–328. doi:10.7182/pit2013501. PMC 4127806. PMID 24311395.
- Rodrigue, James R., et al. "Trajectories of Perceived Benefits in Living Kidney Donors: Association With Donor Characteristics and Recipient Outcomes." Transplantation (2013).
- Rodrigue JR; et al. (2013). "Willingness to Pursue Live-Donor Kidney Transplantation Among Waitlisted Patients Infected With Human Immunodeficiency Virus (HIV): A Preliminary Investigation". Transplantation. 95 (6): 787–790. doi:10.1097/tp.0b013e318282f282. PMC 3604048. PMID 23388735.
- Rodrigue, James R., Jesse D. Schold, and Didier A. Mandelbrot. "The Decline in Living Kidney Donation in the United States: Random Variation or Cause for Concern?." Transplantation (2013).
- Schermerhorn, Marc L., et al. "The impact of Centers for Medicare and Medicaid Services high-risk criteria on outcome after carotid endarterectomy and carotid artery stenting in the SVS Vascular Registry." Journal of Vascular Surgery (2013).
- Schold JD; et al. (2013). "Comorbidity burden and perioperative complications for living kidney donors in the United States". Clinical Journal of the American Society of Nephrology. 8 (10): 1773–1782. doi:10.2215/cjn.12311212. PMC 3789355. PMID 24071651.
- Siracuse, Jeffrey J., et al. "Prosthetic graft infections involving the femoral artery." Journal of Vascular Surgery (2013).
- Smith, Jillian K., et al. "Does increasing insurance improve outcomes for US cancer patients?." Journal of Surgical Research (2013).
- Yoshida, Shunsuke, et al. "The current national criteria for carotid artery stenting overestimate its efficacy in patients who are symptomatic and at high risk." Journal of Vascular Surgery (2013).

=== Publications 2012 ===
- Bensley Rodney P, et al. (2012). "Ultrasound-guided percutaneous endovascular aneurysm repair success is predicted by access vessel diameter". Journal of Vascular Surgery. 55 (6): 1554–1561. doi:10.1016/j.jvs.2011.12.042. PMC 3358509. PMID 22360918.
- Garg Jalaj; et al. (2012). "Social adaptability index predicts kidney transplant outcome: a single-center retrospective analysis". Nephrology Dialysis Transplantation. 27 (3): 1239–1245. doi:10.1093/ndt/gfr445. PMID 22036942.
- Goldfarb-Rumyantzev Alexander; et al. (2011). "New social adaptability index predicts overall mortality". Arch Med Sci. 7 (4): 720–727. doi:10.5114/aoms.2011.24145. PMC 3258768. PMID 22291811.
- Johnson Scott R, et al. (2012). "Liver transplant center risk tolerance". Clinical Transplantation. 26 (3): E269–E276. doi:10.1111/j.1399-0012.2012.01658.x. PMID 22686950. S2CID 5527138.
- Kher Ajay; et al. (2012). "Reimbursement for Living Kidney Donor Follow-Up Care: How Often Does Donor Insurance Pay?". Transplantation. 94 (10): 1049–1051. doi:10.1097/tp.0b013e31826cc9a1. PMC 3934112. PMID 23060280.
- Macomber Christopher W, et al. (2012). "Centre volume and resource consumption in liver transplantation". HPB. 14 (8): 554–559. doi:10.1111/j.1477-2574.2012.00503.x. PMC 3406353. PMID 22762404.
- Nedeau April E, et al. (2012). "Endovascular vs open repair for ruptured abdominal aortic aneurysm". Journal of Vascular Surgery. 56 (1): 15–20. doi:10.1016/j.jvs.2011.12.067. PMC 4032073. PMID 22626871.
- Psoinos Charles M, et al. (2012). "The dangers of being a "weekend warrior": A new call for injury prevention efforts". The Journal of Trauma and Acute Care Surgery. 73 (2): 469–473. doi:10.1097/ta.0b013e318258437c. PMC 3586599. PMID 22846958.
- Ragulin-Coyne, Elizaveta, et al. "Perioperative mortality after pancreatectomy: a risk score to aid decision-making." Surgery (2012).
- Rodrigue James R, et al. (2012). "A Department of Motor Vehicles intervention yields moderate increases in donor designation rates". Progress in Transplantation. 22 (1): 18–24. doi:10.7182/pit2012436. PMID 22489439. S2CID 12500162.
- Rodrigue James R, et al. (2012). "The "House Calls" trial: a randomized controlled trial to reduce racial disparities in live donor kidney transplantation: rationale and design". Contemporary Clinical Trials. 33 (4): 811–818. doi:10.1016/j.cct.2012.03.015. PMC 3361563. PMID 22510472.
- Siracuse Jeffrey J, et al. (2012). "Results for primary bypass versus primary angioplasty/stent for intermittent claudication due to superficial femoral artery occlusive disease". Journal of Vascular Surgery. 55 (4): 1001–1007. doi:10.1016/j.jvs.2011.10.128. PMC 3319263. PMID 22301210.
- Schermerhorn Marc L, et al. (2012). "Changes in abdominal aortic aneurysm rupture and short-term mortality, 1995–2008: a retrospective observational study". Annals of Surgery. 256 (4): 651–658. doi:10.1097/sla.0b013e31826b4f91. PMC 3507435. PMID 22964737.
- Tseng, Jennifer F. "Proceed with Caution: Vascular Resection at Pancreaticoduodenectomy." Annals of Surgical Oncology (2012): 1-2.
- Witkowski Elan R, et al. (2012). "Is it worth looking? Abdominal imaging after pancreatic cancer resection: a national study". Journal of Gastrointestinal Surgery. 16 (1): 121–128. doi:10.1007/s11605-011-1699-z. PMID 21972054. S2CID 29724717.

=== Publications 2011 ===
- Burr AT, Csikesz NG, Gonzales E, Tseng JF, Saidi RF, Bozorgzadeh A, Shah SA (Jun 2011). "Comparison of Right Lobe Donor Hepatectomy with Elective Right Hepatectomy for Other Causes in New York". Dig Dis Sci. 56 (6): 1869–75. doi:10.1007/s10620-010-1489-6. PMID 21113662. S2CID 2396915.
- Burr AT, Li Y, Tseng JF, Saidi RF, Bozorgzadeh A, Shah SA (2011). "Survival After Liver Transplantation Using Hepatitis C Virus-Positive Donor Allografts: Case-Controlled Analysis of the UNOS Database". World J. Surg. 35 (7): 1590–1595. doi:10.1007/s00268-011-1019-5. PMID 21384242. S2CID 96561.
- Clark Emma; Hanto Ruthanne; Rodrigue James R (2010). "Barriers to implementing protocols for kidney paired donation and desensitization: survey of US transplant programs". Progress in Transplantation. 20 (4): 357–365. doi:10.7182/prtr.20.4.b0p721850xm52087. PMID 21265289.
- Giles Kristina A, et al. (2011). "Thirty-day mortality and late survival with reinterventions and readmissions after open and endovascular aortic aneurysm repair in Medicare beneficiaries". Journal of Vascular Surgery. 53 (1): 6–13. doi:10.1016/j.jvs.2010.08.051. PMC 3010445. PMID 21030195.
- Manasanch EE, Smith JK, Bodnari A, McKinney J, Gray C, McDade TP, Tseng JF (Mar 2011). "Tumor registry versus physician medical record review: a direct comparison of patients with pancreatic neuroendocrine tumors". J Oncol Pract. 7 (2): 111–6. doi:10.1200/jop.2010.000097. PMC 3051856. PMID 21731519.
- O'Malley A. James; et al. (2011). "Improving Observational Study Estimates of Treatment Effects Using Joint Modeling of Selection Effects and Outcomes: The Case of AAA Repair". Medical Care. 49 (12): 1126–1132. doi:10.1097/mlr.0b013e3182363d64. PMC 3979312. PMID 22011709.
- Ozhathil DK, Li Y, Smith JK, Tseng JF, Saidi RF, Bozorgzadeh A, Shah SA (Jul 2011). "Effect of centre volume and high donor risk index on liver allograft survival". HPB (Oxford). 13 (7): 447–53. doi:10.1111/j.1477-2574.2011.00320.x. PMC 3133710. PMID 21689227.
- Ozhathil DK, Li Y, Smith JK, Tseng JF, Saidi RF, Bozorgzadeh A, Shah SA (2011). "Impact of center volume on increased risk liver transplant outcomes". Liver Transpl. 17 (10): 1191–1199. doi:10.1002/lt.22343. PMID 21604357. S2CID 2077054.
- Rodrigue James R, et al. (2011). "Altruistic kidney donation to a stranger: psychosocial and functional outcomes at two US transplant centers". Transplantation. 91 (7): 772–778. doi:10.1097/tp.0b013e31820dd2bd. PMID 21285916. S2CID 22412373.
- Rodrigue JR; et al. (2011). "Peginterferon with or without ribavirin has minimal effect on quality of life, behavioral/emotional, and cognitive outcomes in children". Hepatology. 53 (5): 1468–1475. doi:10.1002/hep.24248. PMC 3082614. PMID 21351116.
- Rodrigue James R, et al. (2010). "Spouse caregivers of kidney transplant patients: quality of life and psychosocial outcomes". Progress in Transplantation. 20 (4): 335–343. doi:10.7182/prtr.20.4.g65r17525j278251. PMID 21265286.
- Rodrigue James R.; Hanto Douglas W.; Curry Michael P. (2011). "Patients' expectations and success criteria for liver transplantation". Liver Transplantation. 17 (11): 1309–1317. doi:10.1002/lt.22355. PMID 21656656.
- Shah SA, Smith JK, Li Y, Ng SC, Carroll JE, Tseng JF (Mar 2011). "Underutilization of therapy for hepatocellular carcinoma in the medicare population". Cancer. 117 (5): 1019–26. doi:10.1002/cncr.25683. PMID 20945363. S2CID 9127917.
- Sachs Teviah; et al. (2011). "Resident and fellow experiences after the introduction of endovascular aneurysm repair for abdominal aortic aneurysm". Journal of Vascular Surgery. 54 (3): 881–888. doi:10.1016/j.jvs.2011.03.008. PMC 4385217. PMID 21620615.
- Sachs Teviah; et al. (2011). "Trends in the national outcomes and costs for claudication and limb threatening ischemia: angioplasty vs bypass graft". Journal of Vascular Surgery. 54 (4): 1021–1031. doi:10.1016/j.jvs.2011.03.281. PMID 21880457.
- Schermerhorn Marc L, et al. (2011). "Defining perioperative mortality after open and endovascular aortic aneurysm repair in the US Medicare population". Journal of the American College of Surgeons. 212 (3): 349–355. doi:10.1016/j.jamcollsurg.2010.12.003. PMC 3051838. PMID 21296011.
- Singla A, Hart JL, Li Y, Tseng JF, Shah SA (Feb 2011). "Hospitalization for Complications of Cirrhosis: Does Volume Matter?". J Gastrointest Surg. 15 (2): 330–5. doi:10.1007/s11605-010-1398-1. PMID 21108014. S2CID 21450789.
- Witkowski Elan R, et al. (2012). "Is it worth looking? Abdominal imaging after pancreatic cancer resection: a national study". Journal of Gastrointestinal Surgery. 16 (1): 121–128. doi:10.1007/s11605-011-1699-z. PMID 21972054. S2CID 29724717.

=== Publications 2010 ===
- Al-Refaie WB, Gay G, Virnig BA, Tseng JF, Stewart A, Vickers SM, Tuttle TM, Feig BW (Jan 2010). "Variations in gastric cancer care: a trend beyond racial disparities". Cancer. 116 (2): 465–75. doi:10.1002/cncr.24772. PMID 19950130. S2CID 25598183.
- Burr AT, Csikesz NG, Gonzales E, Tseng JF, Saidi RF, Bozorgzadeh A, Shah SA (2010). "Comparison of Right Lobe Donor Hepatectomy with Elective Right Hepatectomy for Other Casuses in New york". Dig Dis Sci. 56 (6): 1869–1875. doi:10.1007/s10620-010-1489-6. PMID 21113662. S2CID 2396915.
- Burr AT, Shah SA (Apr 2010). "Disparities in Organ Allocation and Access to Liver Transplantation in the United States". Expert Review of Gastroenterology & Hepatology. 4 (2): 133–40. doi:10.1586/egh.10.10. PMID 20350260. S2CID 38576124.
- Carroll JE, Hurwitz ZM, Simons JP, McPhee JT, Ng SC, Shah SA, Al-Refaie WB, Tseng JF (Feb 2010). "In-hospital mortality after resection of biliary tract cancer in the United States". HPB (Oxford). 12 (1): 62–67. doi:10.1111/j.1477-2574.2009.00129.x. PMC 2814406. PMID 20495647.
- Carroll JE, Smith JK, Simons JP, Murphy MM, Ng SC, Shah SA, Zhou Z, Tseng JF (Nov 2010). "Redefining mortality after pancreatic cancer resection". J Gastrointest Surg. 14 (11): 1701–8. doi:10.1007/s11605-010-1326-4. PMID 20844977. S2CID 7124619.
- Colombo B, Singla A, Li Y, Tseng JF, Saidi RF, Bozorgzadeh A, Shah SA (Dec 2010). "Current trends and short-term outcomes of live donor nephrectomy: a population-based analysis of the nationwide inpatient sample". World J. Surg. 34 (12): 2985–90. doi:10.1007/s00268-010-0770-3. PMID 20811748. S2CID 9958285.
- Csikesz NG, Singla A, Murphy MM, Tseng JF, Shah SA (Aug 2010). "Surgeon volume metrics in laparoscopic cholesystectomy". Dig Dis Sci. 55 (8): 2398–405. doi:10.1007/s10620-009-1035-6. PMID 19911275. S2CID 12785952.
- Giles Kristina A, et al. (2010). "Stroke and death after carotid endarterectomy and carotid artery stenting with and without high risk criteria". Journal of Vascular Surgery. 52 (6): 1497–1504. doi:10.1016/j.jvs.2010.06.174. PMC 3005797. PMID 20864299.
- Hill JS, Zhou Z, Simons JP, Ng SC, McDade TP, Whalen GF, Tseng JF (Jul 2010). "A Simple Risk Score to Predict In-Hospital Mortality after Pancreatic Resection for Cancer". Ann Surg Oncol. 17 (7): 1802–1807. doi:10.1245/s10434-010-0947-x. PMID 20155401. S2CID 12857618.
- Manasanch EE, Smith JK, Bodnari A, McKinney J, Gray C, McDade TP, Tseng JF. "Tumor registry versus physician medical record review: A head-tohead comparison of pancreatic neuroendocrine tumor cases. In press, Journal of Oncology Practice.
- McDade TP, Hill JS, Simons JP, Piperdi B, Ng SC, Zhou Z, Kadish SP, Fitzgerald TJ, Tseng JF (Jul 2010). "A National Propensity-Adjusted Analysis of adjuvant radiotherapy in the treatment of resected pancreatic adenocarcinoma". Cancer. 116 (13): 3257–66. doi:10.1002/cncr.25069. PMID 20564625.
- Murphy MM, Ng SC, Simons JP, Csikesz NG, Shah SA, Tseng JF (Jul 2010). "Predictors of Major Complications after Laparoscopic Cholecystectomy:Surgeon, Hospital, or Patient?". J Am Coll Surg. 211 (1): 73–80. doi:10.1016/j.jamcollsurg.2010.02.050. PMID 20610252.
- Murphy MM, Tseng JF, Shah SA (May 2010). "Disparities in Cancer Care: An Operative Perspective". Surgery. 147 (5): 733–7. doi:10.1016/j.surg.2009.10.050. PMID 19962161.
- Murphy MM, Witkowski ER, Ng SC, McDade TP, Hill JS, Larkin AC, Whalen GF, Litwin DE, Tseng JF (2010). "Trends in adrenalectomy: a recent national review". Surg Endosc. 24 (10): 2518–2526. doi:10.1007/s00464-010-0996-z. PMID 20336320. S2CID 2979551.
- Nath B, Li YF, Carroll JE, Szabo G, Tseng JF, Shah SA. "Alcohol exposure as a risk factor for adverse outcomes in elective surgery. J Gastrointest Surg. 210 Nov;14(11)1732-41.
- Piperdi M, McDade TP, Shim JK, Piperdi B, Kadish SP, Sullivan ME, Whalen GF, Tseng JF (Apr 2010). "A neoadjuvant strategy for pancreatic adenocarcinoma increases the likelihood of receiving all components of care: Lessons from a single institution database". HPB (Oxford). 12 (3): 204–210. doi:10.1111/j.1477-2574.2009.00150.x. PMC 2889273. PMID 20590888.
- Schermerhorn ML (Dec 2010). "Current management of selected vascular emergencies". Semin Vasc Surg. 23 (4): 199. doi:10.1053/j.semvascsurg.2010.11.002. PMID 21194635.
- Shah SA, Smith JK, Li Y, Ng SC, Carroll JE, Tseng JF (Oct 2010). "Underutilization of therapy for hepatocellular carcinoma in the medicare population". Cancer. 117 (5): 1019–1026. doi:10.1002/cncr.25683. PMID 20945363. S2CID 9127917.
- Simons JP, Ng SC, Hill JS, Shah SA, Zhou Z, Tseng JF (Apr 2010). "In-hospital mortality from liver resection for hepatocellular carcinoma: a simple risk score". Cancer. 116 (7): 1733–1738. doi:10.1002/cncr.24904. PMID 20143433.
- Simons JP, Ng SC, McDade TP, Zhou Z, Shah SA, Earle CC, Tseng JF (Apr 2010). "Progress for resectable cancer? A population-based assessment of US practices". Cancer. 116 (7): 1681–1690. doi:10.1002/cncr.24918. PMID 20143432.
- Singla A, Hart JL, Li Y, Tseng JF, Shah SA (2010). "Hospitalization for Complications of Cirrhosis: Does Volume Matter?". J Gastrointest Surg. 15 (2): 330–335. doi:10.1007/s11605-010-1398-1. PMID 21108014. S2CID 21450789.
- Singla A, Simons JP, Carroll JE, Li YF, Ng SC, Tseng JF, Shah SA (Mar 2010). "Hospital Volume as a Surrogate for Laparoscopic-Assisted Colectomy". Surg Endosc. 24 (3): 662–9. doi:10.1007/s00464-009-0665-2. PMID 19688386. S2CID 34810373.
- Smith JK, Hill JS, Ng SC, McDade TP, Shah SA, Tseng JF (Nov 2010). "Potential benefit of resection for stage IV gastric cancer: A national survey". J Gastrointest Surg. 14 (11): 1660–8. doi:10.1007/s11605-010-1351-3. PMID 20827576. S2CID 1291778.
- Smith JK, Ng SC, Hill JS, Simons JP, Arous EJ, Shah SA, Tseng JF, McDade TP (Sep 2010). "Complications after pancreatectomy for neuroendocrine tumors: A national study". J Surg Res. 163 (1): 63–8. doi:10.1016/j.jss.2010.04.017. PMID 20599224.
- Wiseman JT, Sharuk MN, Singla A, Cahan M, Litwin DE, Tseng JF, Shah SA (May 2010). "Surgical Management of Acute Cholecystitis at a Tertiary Care Center in the Modern Era". Arch. Surg. 145 (5): 439–44. doi:10.1001/archsurg.2010.54. PMID 20479341.
- Zhou Z, McDade TP, Simons JP, Ng SC, Lambert LA, Whalen GF, Shah SA, Tseng JF (2010). "Surgery and radio therapy for retroperitoneal and abdominal sarcoma: both necessary and sufficient?". Arch Surg. 145 (5): 426–431. doi:10.1001/archsurg.2010.70. PMID 20479339.

=== Publications 2009 ===
- Cooley EK, McPhee JT, Simons JP, Sweeney WB, Tseng JF, Alavi K. Colorectal neoplasia screening before age 50? "Current epidemiologic trends in the United States. Dis Colon Rectum 2009 Feb; 52(2):222-9.
- Csikesz NG, Nguyen LN, Tseng JF, Shah SA (Jan 2009). "Nationwide Volume and Mortality After Elective Surgery in Cirrhotic Patients". J Am Coll Surg. 208 (1): 96–103. doi:10.1016/j.jamcollsurg.2008.09.006. PMID 19228510.
- Csikesz NG, Singla A, Simons JP, Tseng JF, Shah SA (Nov 2009). "The impact of socioeconomic status on presentation and treatment of diverticular disease". J Gastrointest Surg. 13 (11): 1993–2001. doi:10.1007/s11605-009-1031-3. PMID 19760302. S2CID 38073393.
- Eppsteiner RW, Csikesz NG, McPhee JT, Tseng JF, Shah SA (Apr 2009). "Surgeon Volume Impacts Hospital Mortality for Pancreatic Resection". Ann Surg. 249 (4): 635–40. doi:10.1097/sla.0b013e31819ed958. PMID 19300225. S2CID 21302051.
- Hill JS, McPhee JT, McDade TP, Zhou Z, Sullivan ME, Whalen GF, Tseng JF (2009). "Pancreatic Neuroendocrine tumors: the impact of surgical resection on survival". Cancer. 115 (4): 741–751. doi:10.1002/cncr.24065. PMID 19130464.
- Hill JS, McPhee JT, Whalen GF, Sullivan ME, Warshaw AL, Tseng JF (Oct 2009). "In-Hospital Mortality after Pancreatic Resection for Chronic Pancreatitis: Population Based Estimates from the Nationwide Inpatient Sample". J Am Coll Surg. 209 (4): 468–76. doi:10.1016/j.jamcollsurg.2009.05.030. PMID 19801320.
- McPhee JT, Eslami MH, Arous EJ, Messina LM, Schanzer A (Apr 2009). "Endovascular Treatment of Ruptured Abdominal Aortic Aneurysms in the United States (2001-2006) A Significant Survival Benefit Over Open Repair is Independently Associated with Increased Institutional Volume". Journal of Vascular Surgery. 49 (4): 817–26. doi:10.1016/j.jvs.2008.11.002. PMID 19147323.
- Murphy MM, Knaus WJ, Ng SC, Hill JS, McPhee JT, Shah SA, Tseng JT (Sep 2009). "Total Pancreatectomy: A National Study". HPB (Oxford). 11 (6): 476–482. doi:10.1111/j.1477-2574.2009.00076.x. PMC 2756634. PMID 19816611.
- Murphy MM, Shah SA, Simons JP, Csikesz NG, McDade TP, Bodnari A, Ng SC, Zhou Z, Tseng JF (Nov 2009). "Predicting Major Complications after Laparoscopic Cholecystectomy: A Simple Risk Score". Journal of Gastrointestinal Surgery. 13 (11): 1929–1936. doi:10.1007/s11605-009-0979-3. PMID 19672665. S2CID 19466099.
- Murphy MM, Simons JP, Hill JS, McDade TP, Ng SC, Whalen GF, Shah SA, Harrison LH, Tseng JF (Sep 2009). "Pancreatic Resection: A Key Component to Reducing Racial Disparities in Pancreatic Adenocarcinoma". Cancer. 115 (17): 3979–90. doi:10.1002/cncr.24433. PMID 19514091.
- Murphy MM, Simons JP, Ng SC, McDade TP, Smith JK, Shah SA, Zhou Z, Earle CC, Tseng JF (Nov 2009). "Racial Differences in Cancer Specialist Consultation, Treatment, and Outcomes for Locoregional Pancreatic Adenocarcinoma". Ann Surg Oncol. 16 (11): 2968–77. doi:10.1245/s10434-009-0656-5. PMID 19669839. S2CID 35362706.
- Simons JP, Hill JS, Ng SC, Shah SA, Zhou Z, Whalen GF, Tseng JF (Dec 2009). "Perioperative Mortality for Management of Hepatic Neoplasm: A Simple Risk Score". Ann Surg. 250 (6): 929–934. doi:10.1097/sla.0b013e3181bc9c2f. PMID 19855257. S2CID 28334621.
- Simons JP, Ng SC, Hill JS, Shah SA, Bodnari A, Zhou Z, Tseng JF (Sep 2009). "In-hospital mortality for liver resection for metastatic disease: a simple risk score". J Surg Res. 156 (1): 21–25. doi:10.1016/j.jss.2009.03.073. PMID 19577250.
- Simons JP, Ng SC, Shah SA, McDade TP, Whalen GF, Tseng JF (2009). "Malignant Intraductal Papillary Mucinous Neoplasm: Are We Doing the Right Thing?". Journal of Surgical Research. 167 (2): 251–257. doi:10.1016/j.jss.2009.05.035. PMID 19765732.
- Simons JP, Shah SA, Ng SC, Whalen GF, Tseng JF (Oct 2009). "National Complication Rates after Pancreatectomy: Beyond Mere Mortality". J Gastrointest Surg. 13 (10): 1798–805. doi:10.1007/s11605-009-0936-1. PMID 19506975. S2CID 31779087.
- Singla A, Csikesz NG, Simons JP, Li YF, Ng SC, Tseng JF, Shah SA (Aug 2009). "National Hospital Volume in Acute Pancreatitis: Analysis of the Nationwide Inpatient Sample 1998-2006". HPB (Oxford). 11 (5): 391–7. doi:10.1111/j.1477-2574.2009.00072.x. PMC 2742608. PMID 19768143.
- Singla A, Li Y, Ng SC, Csikesz NG, Tseng JF, Shah SA (2009). "Is the growth in laparoscipic surgery reproducible with more complex procedures?". Surgery. 146 (2): 367–74. doi:10.1016/j.surg.2009.06.006. PMID 19628097.
- Singla A, Simons JP, Li Y, Csikesz NG, Ng SC, Tseng JF, Shah SA (Dec 2009). "Admission volume determines outcome for patients with acute pancreatitis: a case-controlled analysis". Gastroenterology. 137 (6): 1995–2001. doi:10.1053/j.gastro.2009.08.056. PMID 19733570.

=== Publications 2008 ===
- Al-Refaie WB, Tseng JF, Gay G, et al. (August 2008). "The impact of ethnicity on the presentation and prognosis of patients with gastric adenocarcinoma. Results from the National Cancer Data Base". Cancer. 113 (3): 461–9. doi:10.1002/cncr.23572. PMID 18553367.
- Hill JS, McPhee JT, Messina LM, Ciocca RG, Eslami MH (July 2008). "Regionalization of abdominal aortic aneurysm repair: evidence of a shift to high-volume centers in the endovascular era". J. Vasc. Surg. 48 (1): 29–36. doi:10.1016/j.jvs.2008.02.048. PMID 18589227.
- Csikesz N, Ricciardi R, Tseng JF, Shah SA (October 2008). "Current status of surgical management of acute cholecystitis in the United States". World J Surg. 32 (10): 2230–6. doi:10.1007/s00268-008-9679-5. PMID 18668287. S2CID 7956846.
- Csikesz NG, Simons JP, Tseng JF, Shah SA (September 2008). "Surgical specialization and operative mortality in hepato-pancreatico-biliary (HPB) surgery". J. Gastrointest. Surg. 12 (9): 1534–9. doi:10.1007/s11605-008-0566-z. PMID 18612710. S2CID 557379.
- Csikesz NG, Tseng JF, Shah SA (August 2008). "Trends in surgical management for acute cholecystitis". Surgery. 144 (2): 283–9. doi:10.1016/j.surg.2008.03.033. PMID 18656637.
- Eppsteiner RW, Csikesz NG, Simons JP, Tseng JF, Shah SA (October 2008). "High volume and outcome after liver resection: surgeon or center?". J. Gastrointest. Surg. 12 (10): 1709–16, discussion 1716. doi:10.1007/s11605-008-0627-3. PMID 18704600. S2CID 21790010.
- McPhee JT, Schanzer A, Messina LM, Eslami MH (December 2008). "Carotid artery stenting has increased rates of postprocedure stroke, death, and resource utilization than does carotid endarterectomy in the United States, 2005". J. Vasc. Surg. 48 (6): 1442–50, 1450.e1. doi:10.1016/j.jvs.2008.07.017. PMID 18829236.
- Murphy MM, Simons JP, Hill JS, et al. (September 2009). "Pancreatic resection: a key component to reducing racial disparities in pancreatic adenocarcinoma". Cancer. 115 (17): 3979–90. doi:10.1002/cncr.24433. PMID 19514091.
- Tseng JF (March 2008). "Management of serous cystadenoma of the pancreas". J. Gastrointest. Surg. 12 (3): 408–10. doi:10.1007/s11605-007-0360-3. PMID 17963014. S2CID 24830805.
- Tseng JF, Fernández-del Castillo C, Warshaw AL. Survival after medical and surgical treatment of pancreatic adenocarcinoma. In: Beger HG, Matsuno S, Cameron JL, eds. Diseases of the Pancreas: Current Surgical Therapy. Heidelberg: Springer Inc, 2008;61:695-704

=== Publications 2007 ===
- Hill JS, Shankar S, Evans DB, Tseng JF. "Control of bleeding from the portal/superior mesenteric vein. Operative Techniques in General Surgery 2007 Dec;(9)4:152-159
- McPhee JT, Hill JS, Ciocca RG, Messina LM, Eslami MH (December 2007). "Carotid endarterectomy was performed with lower stroke and death rates than carotid artery stenting in the United States in 2003 and 2004". J. Vasc. Surg. 46 (6): 1112–1118. doi:10.1016/j.jvs.2007.08.030. PMID 18154987.
- McPhee JT, Hill JS, Eslami MH (May 2007). "The impact of gender on presentation, therapy, and mortality of abdominal aortic aneurysm in the United States, 2001–2004". J. Vasc. Surg. 45 (5): 891–9. doi:10.1016/j.jvs.2007.01.043. PMID 17391899.
- McPhee JT, Asham EH, Rohrer MJ, et al. (April 2007). "The midterm results of stent graft treatment of thoracic aortic injuries". J. Surg. Res. 138 (2): 181–8. doi:10.1016/j.jss.2006.09.039. PMID 17292414.
- McPhee JT, Hill JS, Whalen GF, et al. (August 2007). "Perioperative mortality for pancreatectomy: a national perspective". Ann. Surg. 246 (2): 246–53. doi:10.1097/01.sla.0000259993.17350.3a. PMC 1933570. PMID 17667503.
- Smith JK, McPhee JT, Hill JS, et al. (April 2007). "National outcomes after gastric resection for neoplasm". Arch Surg. 142 (4): 387–93. doi:10.1001/archsurg.142.4.387. PMID 17441293.
- Tseng JF, Fernández-del Castillo C, Warshaw AL. The cystic tumors of the pancreas. In: Blumgart LH, ed. Surgery of the Liver, Biliary Tract and Pancreas. Philadelphia: Elsevier Inc, 2007
- Tseng JF, Pisters PW, Lee JE, et al. (April 2007). "The learning curve in pancreatic surgery". Surgery. 141 (4): 456–63. doi:10.1016/j.surg.2006.09.013. PMID 17383522.

== See also ==
- Surgery
- Cardiac surgery
- Hypnosurgery
- Surgical sieve
