= Marie Mutsuki Mockett =

Asian-American novelist and memoirist

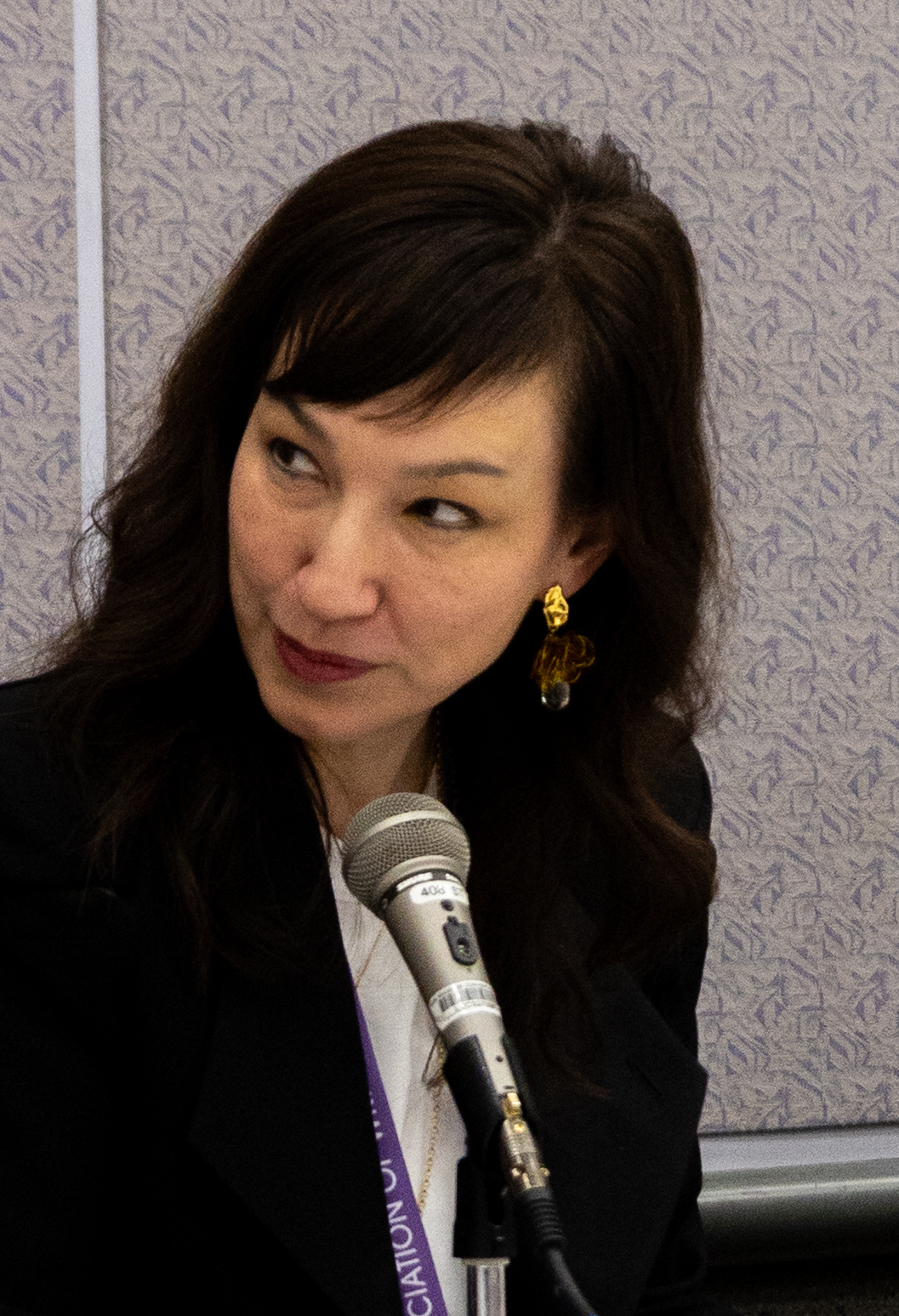
- Mockett at AWP 2025
- Education: Columbia University
- Occupations: Novelist, memoirist

Marie Mutsuki Mockett is an American novelist and memoirist.

== Life ==
Mockett was born to a Japanese mother and an American father and grew up speaking English, German and Japanese. Her mother's family owns a Buddhist temple in Tōhoku Japan, 25 miles from the Fukushima Daichi nuclear power reactor. Her father's family owns a wheat farm in Nebraska. Mockett graduated from the Robert Louis Stevenson School in Pebble Beach, California and Columbia University in 1992. Her debut novel, Picking Bones from Ash, was published in 2009 and shortlisted for the Paterson Prize.

An op-ed published in The New York Times about the effects of the 2011 Great East Japan Earthquake in Japan ultimately led to the publication of Mockett's memoir, Where the Dead Pause and the Japanese Say Goodbye, which was shortlisted for the PEN Open Book Award and the Northern California Book Award. It was also a Barnes & Noble Discover Pick. American Harvest, her third book, follows her travels through the American heartland in the company of evangelical harvesters and examines the rural and urban divide. This book won the 2020 Northern California Book Award for General Nonfiction. Calling on her own biracial, bicultural identity, Mockett strove to see the "other" in a divided America.

In 2022, she was awarded a Fulbright Scholarship to live and conduct research at Waseda University in Tokyo. Her most recent book, a novel titled The Tree Doctor, was published by Graywolf Press in 2024 to critical acclaim. This contemporary post-pandemic novel was a most-anticipated book according to The Washington Post and Oprah and features a coming of middle age heroine who reinvents herself, through an affair with a mysterious arborist, against the backdrop of the Japanese classic The Tale of Genji. Mockett's essays have appeared in Elle, The New York Times, and Salon. She has taught at Saint Mary's College MFA and the Rainier Writing Workshop and is currently on the faculty of the Bennington Writing Seminars. With Kiese Laymon, she is also a series editor of the new nonfiction imprint, Great Circle Books, published by University of North Carolina Press.

== Works ==
=== Fiction ===
- Picking Bones from Ash, Graywolf Press, 2009. ISBN 9781555975418
- The Tree Doctor, Graywolf Press, 2024. ISBN 9781644452776

=== Nonfiction ===
- Where the Dead Pause, and the Japanese Say Goodbye, W. W. Norton, 2015. ISBN 9780393063011
- American Harvest: God, Country, and Farming in the Heartland, Graywolf Press, 2020. ISBN 9781644450178
