= Gina Apostol =

Filipino-born writer

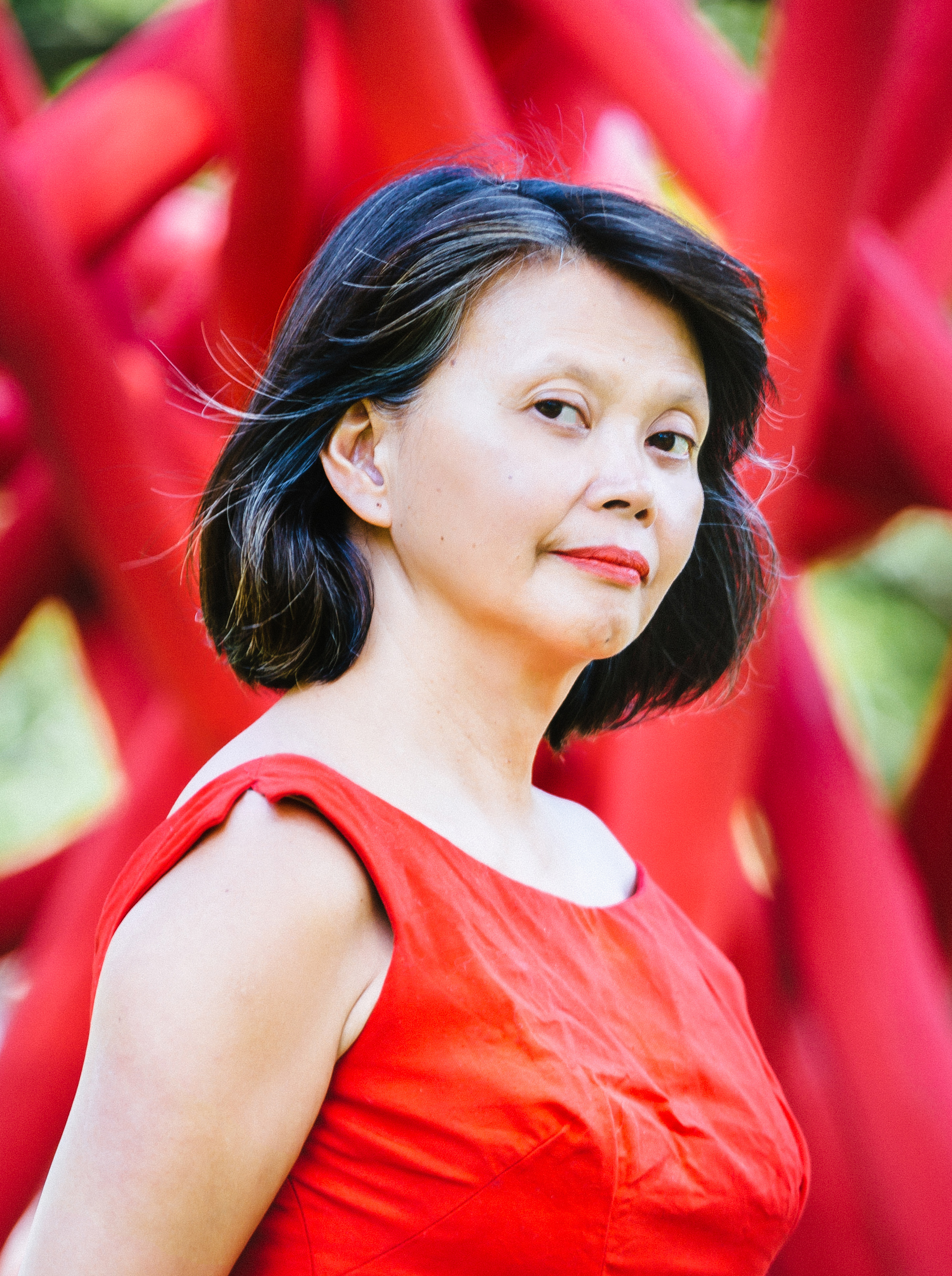
- Photo by Margarita Corporan
- Born: Gina Lourdes Delgado Apostol; Manila, Philippines
- Education: University of the Philippines Diliman (BA); Johns Hopkins University (MA)
- Spouse: Arne Tangherlini (died 1998)
- Writing career
- Notable works: Gun Dealers' Daughter (2013); Insurrecto (2018)
- Notable awards: Philippine National Book Awards (1997, 2010); PEN/Open Book (2013)
- Website: ginaapostol.com

Gina Lourdes Delgado Apostol (born 1963) is a Filipino-born writer based in the United States. She won the 2023 Rome Prize in Literature for her proposed novel, The Treatment of Paz.

== Biography ==
=== Early life and education ===
Gina Lourdes Delgado Apostol was born in Manila the second child of her mother, Virginia. She grew up in Tacloban, Leyte, where she studied at Divine World College. Afterwards, she earned a bachelor's degree from the University of the Philippines, Diliman, and a master's degree in creative writing from Johns Hopkins University.

=== Literary career ===
Apostol's debut novel Bibliolepsy, published by the University of the Philippines Press, won the 1997 Philippine National Book Award for Fiction. The novel is set in Manila in the 1980s, during the dictatorship of Ferdinand Marcos up to the 1986 People Power Revolution. On its first run, the novel sold out and went out of print. It was republished in the United States by Soho Press in 2022.

Her second novel, The Revolution According to Raymundo Mata won the 2010 Philippine National Book Award for Fiction, as well as the biannual Gintong Aklat Award. It was republished in the United States by Soho Press in 2021.

Her American debut, Gun Dealers' Daughter, won the 2013 PEN Open Book Award and was shortlisted for the 2014 Saroyan International Prize.

Her 2018 novel, Insurrecto, was one of Publishers Weekly's 2018 Ten Best Books, and was shortlisted for the Dayton Literary Peace Prize. Portions of her short story, "The Unintended," which was published in the Manila Noir anthology edited by Jessica Hagedorn, appear in the novel.

She has contributed to the Los Angeles Review of Books, The New York Times, and Foreign Policy.

In a 2019 interview, Apostol said that her current favorite novelist was Elena Ferrante.

The Nobel Library of the Swedish Academy owns two of her novels, Insurrecto and Gun Dealer's Daughter.

=== Personal life ===
In 1998, Apostol's husband, Arne Tangherlini, died. In 2013, Apostol was diagnosed with breast cancer. She subsequently underwent a bilateral mastectomy and chemotherapy.

== Awards and honors ==
=== Winner ===
- 1997: Philippine National Book Awards – Bibliolepsy
- 2010: Philippine National Book Awards – The Revolution According to Raymundo Mata
- 2010: Gintong Aklat Award – The Revolution According to Raymundo Mata
- 2013: PEN Open Book Award – Gun Dealers' Daughter
- 2023: Rome Prize in Literature – The Treatment of Paz

=== Shortlists ===
- 2014: Saroyan International Prize – Gun Dealers' Daughter
- 2019: Dayton Literary Peace Prize – Insurrecto

== Bibliography ==
=== Novels ===
- —— (1997). Bibliolepsy. University of the Philippines Press.
- —— (2009). The Revolution According to Raymundo Mata. Anvil Publishing.
- —— (2010). Gun Dealer's Daughter. Anvil Publishing.
- —— (2018). Insurrecto. Soho Press.
- —— (2023). La Tercera. Soho Press.

=== Short stories ===
- "The Mistress" published in Babaylan (2000)
- "Fredo Avila" published in Bold Worlds (2001)
- "Cunanan's Wake" published in Charlie Chan Is Dead 2 (2004)
- "The Unintended" published in Manila Noir (2013)

=== Non-fiction ===
- "In the Philippines, Haunted by History." The New York Times. April 28, 2012.
- "Borges, Politics, and the Postcolonial." Los Angeles Review of Books. August 18, 2013.
- "Surrender, Oblivion, Survival." The New York Times. November 14, 2013.
- "Transparency: Relieving the Body Despair." ABS-CBN. January 17, 2014.
- "Why Benedict Anderson Counts." Los Angeles Review of Books. March 4, 2014.
- "Imperialism 2.0." Foreign Policy. April 29, 2014.
- "Rodrigo Duterte: Strongman, jokerman." CNN Philippines. May 9, 2016.
- "President Duterte and our revolutionary history." CNN Philippines. October 14, 2016.
- "Speaker in Fascism's Tongues." The New York Times. May 19, 2017.
- "Who Hits Golf Balls Into the Sea?" The New York Times. January 12, 2018.
- "Francine Prose's Problem." Los Angeles Review of Books. January 17, 2018.
