= Alexis Okeowo =

American journalist

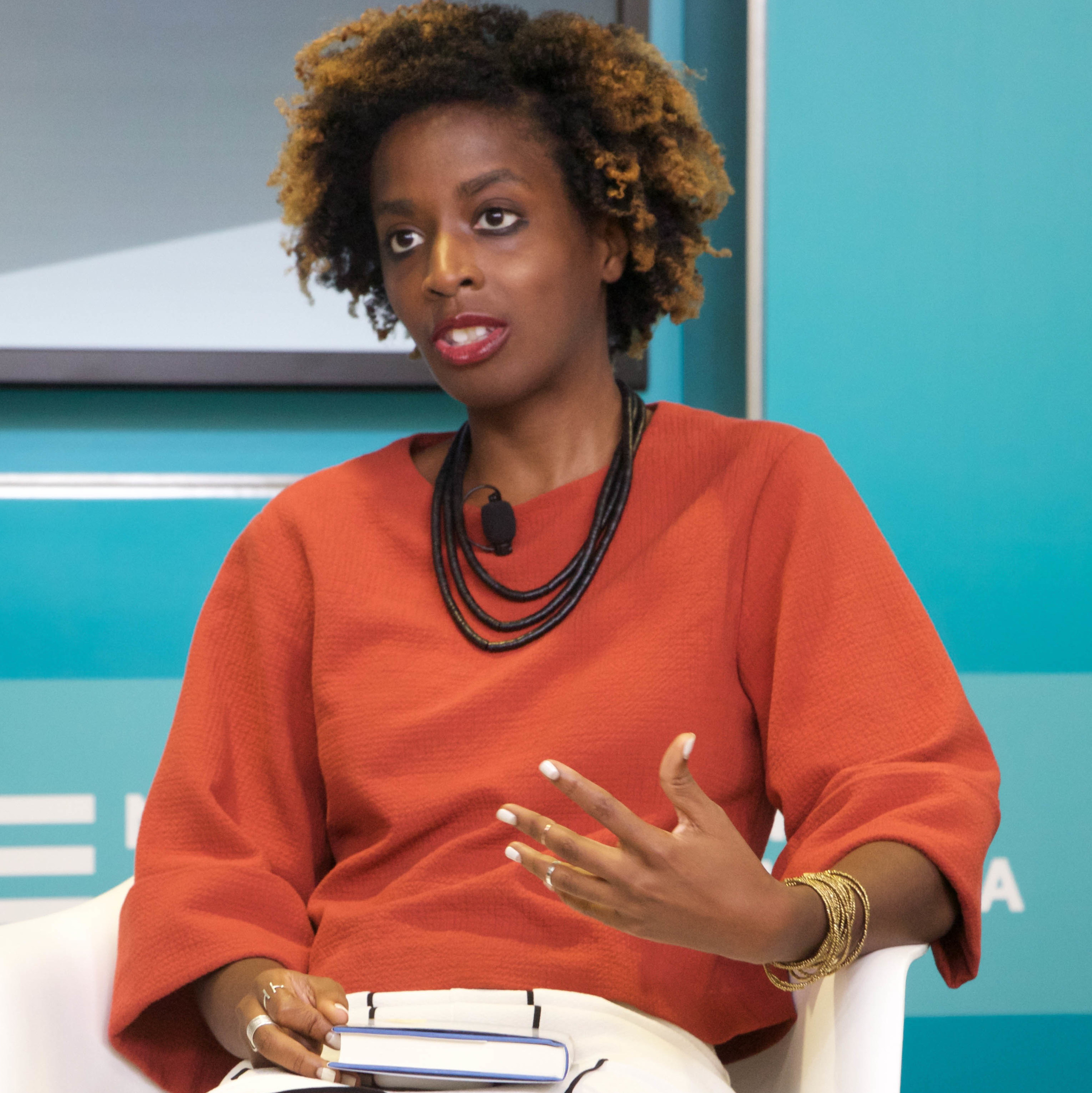
- Okeowo in 2017
- Education: Princeton University
- Occupation: Journalist
- Employer: The New Yorker
- Notable work: A Moonless, Starless Sky: Ordinary Women and Men Fighting Extremism in Africa (2017)
- Awards: PEN Open Book Award (2018); Front Page Award (2020)

Alexis Okeowo is an American journalist and a staff writer at The New Yorker. They are the author of A Moonless, Starless Sky: Ordinary Women and Men Fighting Extremism in Africa (2017).

== Early life ==
Okeowo grew up in Alabama, the child of Nigerian parents. They attended Princeton University, graduating in 2006.

== Career ==
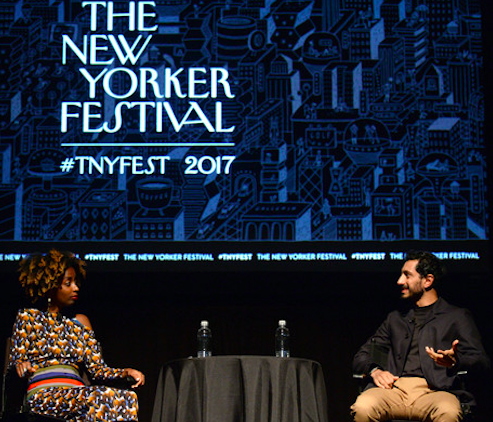
Okeowo with Riz Ahmed at The New Yorker Festival in 2017

From 2006 to 2007, Okeowo was a Princeton in Africa Fellow working at the New Vision newspaper in Uganda. In 2012, they won an Alicia Patterson Foundation Fellowship to write about gay rights in Africa. They became a staff writer at the New Yorker in 2015 and are working on a book about people standing up to extremism in Africa at the New America Foundation. Their 2017 book A Moonless, Starless Sky: Ordinary Women and Men Fighting Extremism in Africa was reviewed favorably.

Their work has appeared in the anthologies Best American Travel Writing 2017 and Best American Sports Writing 2017.

The Christian Science Monitor called Okeowo one of the "finest war and foreign correspondents" at The New Yorker: "Alexis Okeowo, who was named a staff writer in late 2015, is continuing the tradition of the foreign correspondent who takes considerable personal risks driven by the conviction that all stories deserve to be told, particularly those that require a great deal of courage to uncover in the first place."

== Awards and honors ==
- 2014: Kurt Schork Memorial Award finalist
- 2015: Livingston Award for international reporting, finalist.
- 2017: Elle magazine's 27 "best books", for A Moonless, Starless Sky
- 2018: PEN Open Book Award, winner for A Moonless, Starless Sky
- 2020: The Front Page Award for Journalist of the Year from the Newswomen's Club of New York

== Bibliography ==
=== Books ===
- Okeowo, Alexis (2017). A Moonless, Starless Sky: ordinary women and men fighting extremism in Africa. New York: Hachette Books.

=== Essays and reporting ===
- Okeowo, Alexis (January 25, 2016). "Trending". The Talk of the Town. Up Life's Ladder. The New Yorker. 91 (45): 22. (Note: Title in the online table of contents is "LaQuan Smith's conspicuous couture".)

———————
