= Brandon Shimoda =

American poet

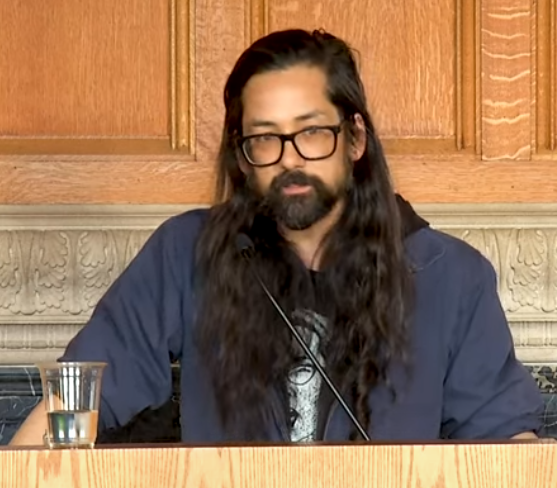
- At UC Berkeley's Lunch Poems in 2024
- Occupations: Poet, professor
- Employer: Colorado College

Brandon Shimoda is an American poet. He is the author of several poetry collections, including O Bon and Evening Oracle, as well as the memoir The Grave on the Wall. A professor at Colorado College, Shimoda is also the creator of the Hiroshima Library.

== Early life and education ==
Shimoda was born in Tarzana, California. His mother, Karen McAlister Shimoda, is an artist. His father, Midori Shimoda, lives in Thailand. In high school, Shimoda played in a band. Some of his bandmates published poems at the time. During his undergraduate years in the nineties, Shimoda took an Asian American history class and learned about Japanese American incarceration during World War II while reading Strangers from a Different Shore by Ronald Takaki. Afterward, he interviewed his grandmother about it: "The learning and the questions have, since then, not stopped."

== Career ==
In 2019, Shimoda created the Hiroshima Library, a collection of books, documents, archival materials, testimonies, and other ephemera regarding the atomic bombings of Hiroshima and Nagasaki. It has since traveled from Marfa, Texas to Bellingham, Washington to the Japanese American National Museum where it remained through building closures during the COVID-19 pandemic. In 2022, it moved to Denver, Colorado for a brief stay through the summer of that year. Shimoda said the library unofficially started on his 10th birthday when he was given a book by Keiji Nakazawa; the book, I Saw It: The Atomic Bombing of Hiroshima: A Survivor’s True Story, is still kept in Shimoda's library.

Shimoda is an assistant professor of creative writing at Colorado College.

== Publications ==
Shimoda released his debut poetry collection The Alps and the poetry chapbook The Inland Sea in 2008. Three years later, in 2011, he released two poetry collections: The Girl Without Arms with Black Ocean and O Bon with Litmus Press.

In 2013, Shimoda published a poetry collection called Portuguese with Tin House and Octopus Books. A book about the fluidity and simultaneity of racial identity, it concerns a moment in Shimoda's childhood when a boy on the school bus called him Portuguese.

In 2014, Shimoda and co-editor Thom Donovan published an edited Etel Adnan anthology, To look at the sea is to become what one is, with Nightboat Books. The Rumpus called it "a groundbreaking roll call stridently feminist and anti-war to its core" with most if not all of Adnan's essential work.

In 2015, Shimoda released his poetry collection, Evening Oracle, with Letter Machine Editions. It won the William Carlos Williams Award. The Colorado Review appreciated the "liminality" of Shimoda's poems as they, with a diversity of speakers, confronted questions of lineage and history.

In 2018, Shimoda published a two-volume work, The Desert, with The Song Cave. Publishers Weekly called it a "marathon-length elegy" within which Shimoda contends with the history of his Japanese and Japanese American ancestors, specifically with regard to the internment of Japanese Americans which affected his grandfather Midori Shimoda.

In 2019, Shimoda released a hybrid book of poetry and prose, called The Grave on the Wall, published by City Lights. The book was written after Midori Shimoda's death and follows Shimoda's own journey across the United States and Japan as he mourns but also continues his usual inquiries into lineage and history. Kirkus Reviews called it "A memoir of sorts that blurs the boundary between the personal and the universal."

In 2023, Shimoda released another poetry collection, Hydra Medusa, with Nightboat Books. The Poetry Foundation lauded the cohesiveness and strength of Shimoda's voice and composition, calling the book "at once a memorial to the past and a survey of its aftermath."

Shimoda's book, The Afterlife Is Letting Go, is forthcoming from City Lights in December of 2024. In 2020, Shimoda had gotten grant support from the Whiting Foundation for its researching and writing. A book about internment, it seeks to question the politics of memory and memorialization. Another anthology by Shimoda, titled The Gate of Memory: Poems by Descendants of Nikkei Wartime Incarceration, co-edited with Brynn Saito is forthcoming from Haymarket Books in 2025.

== Personal life ==
Shimoda's partner is the poet Dot Devota. Together, they have a daughter. In 2022, Shimoda published an article with LitHub about reading books about Japanese American incarceration with her.

Shimoda has stated that his mother originally wanted to name him Kenji, but his father ultimately insisted on the name Brandon.
