= Jennifer F. Tseng =

American surgical oncologist and gastrointestinal surgeon

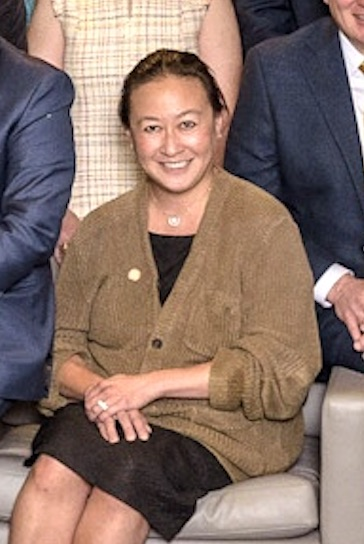
- Born: Berkeley, California, USA
- Spouse: Marc Sabatine (m. 2000)

Academic background
- Education: BS, biology and English, Stanford University; MD, University of California, San Francisco; MPH, Harvard T.H. Chan School of Public Health

Jennifer Fan-Yu Tseng is an American surgical oncologist and gastrointestinal surgeon. In 2017, she became the first woman in Boston to lead surgical units at a medical school and teaching hospital.

== Early life and education ==
Tseng was born to Rose Yun-Li Tseng and Raymond Chi-Jen Tseng. Her father was an engineer and her mother a nutritionist and educator whose last position was Chancellor of University of Hawaiʻi at Hilo. She was born into a medical family as her grandfather was a general and thoracic surgeon and her grandmother was an OB-GYN and primary care doctor in China and Taiwan.

Born and raised in Berkeley, California to immigrant parents, Tseng started preschool without speaking English. She learned English in preschool and also through her parents RCA black-and-white TV set. During high school and college, Tseng worked as a medical receptionist at the Palo Alto Medical Center before switching to Valley Medical Center, a county hospital in San Jose. Tseng attended Stanford University for her undergraduate's degree in biology and English and enrolled at the University of California, San Francisco for her medical degree. She then moved to Boston, Massachusetts, and completed her Master's degree at Harvard T.H. Chan School of Public Health. She completed a general surgery residency at Massachusetts General Hospital and a research fellowship in molecular medicine at Harvard Medical School/Boston Children’s Hospital, followed by a clinical fellowship in surgical oncology at the University of Texas MD Anderson Cancer Center.

== Career ==
Upon completing her residency and fellowship, Tseng joined the faculty at the University of Massachusetts Medical School. In April 2006, Tseng was named the first research scholar of the Pancreatic Cancer Alliance and later won a Howard Hughes Medical Institute Physician-Scientist Early Career Award. The following year, she was the Founding Director of SOAR (Surgical Outcomes Analysis and Research), a research initiative to improve treatment strategies for surgical conditions and to develop tools to assess and reduce risk. In 2017, Tseng continued her research into oncologic surgery and was granted appointments to various leadership positions across Boston. In March, she was named to the Board of Directors for Mauna Kea Technologies as an Independent Director. She completed her term and resigned from the Board of Mauna Kea December 2020. She later became the first woman in Boston to lead surgical units at a medical school and teaching hospital when she was appointed Chief and Chair of Surgery at Boston Medical Center (BMC). During 2019, Tseng was selected as a Director of the American Board of Surgery and recipient of the 2020 Pinnacle Award in the "Achievements in the Professions" category by the Greater Boston Chamber of Commerce Women’s Network.

As a result of her research, Tseng was also named to various editorial boards of several journals including the Deputy Editor of JAMA Surgery. She is also an active member of numerous surgical societies, including the American Surgical Association, the Society of University Surgeons, and the Society of Surgical Oncology. In 2021, she was named President-Elect of the Society for Surgery of the Alimentary Tract and is a founder and past president of the Society of Asian Academic Surgeons.

== Personal life ==
Tseng married Marc Sabatine in 2000. They have two children and live in greater Boston.
