= The Rupture Tense =

2022 poetry collection by Jenny Xie

- Author: Jenny Xie
- Publisher: Graywolf Press
- Publication date: September 20, 2022
- Pages: 120
- Awards: PEN Oakland/Josephine Miles Literary Award
- ISBN: 978-1644452011
- Preceded by: Eye Level
- Followed by: Holding Pattern

The Rupture Tense is a 2022 poetry collection by Jenny Xie, published by Graywolf Press. Motivated by Xie's visit to China in 2019, the book's poem discusses her Chinese American identity alongside the broader history of the Cultural Revolution. It was nominated for several prizes and won a PEN Oakland/Josephine Miles Literary Award.

== Contents and background ==
Xie was born in Hefei, China. At age four, she immigrated to the United States with her mother to settle down in Piscataway, New Jersey, as her father was a doctoral student in mathematics at Rutgers University. Later, in 2018, Xie released her debut poetry collection, Eye Level.

The next year, in 2019, Xie would return to China, visiting Hefei as well as Wuhu in the Anhui province for the first time after having moved away around 30 years before. During her visit, she would begin writing the poems that would appear in The Rupture Tense; she would also encounter Li Zhensheng's photographs in a library at New York University Shanghai and "devoured it in one sitting." Xie then returned to the United States, ending up back in New York City right before the onset of the COVID-19 pandemic. Li would pass shortly after in 2020; Xie would then wrote a poem after him.

The Rupture Tense, Xie's second poetry collection, tackles her identity as an Asian American by partly interrogating the Cultural Revolution and other aspects of modern Chinese history, with poems that interface with photographs by Li, while also reflecting on her own estrangement and linguistic alienation as someone who grew up in the United States. Xie told The Yale Review that writing some of its poems during the pandemic proved challenging at first but more possible later:

"In all honesty, I struggled to write and 'work' during stretches of the pandemic. Initially, my faith in the moral significance of writing weakened in the face of everything. But as the weeks and months passed, I also had a bit more time in my days, and some of what I’d been generating before gave welcome relief from the immediate, rapid-fire developments of the news. I returned to writing because it afforded a kind of immersion in something that wasn’t just the loop of pandemic-news reactivity and fear."

== Critical reception ==
The book was a finalist for the 2022 National Book Award for Poetry and the 2022 CLMP Firecracker Award.

In a starred review, Publishers Weekly said "Xie’s detached and precise language in the earlier poems echoes the oppressive climate of the Revolution and makes the more emotionally charged poems hit harder. This is a devastating master class in subtlety."

Some critics observed Xie's approach to Chinese American diaspora. The New York Times said "Xie ingeniously leverages Western prosody to expose the fracture between the 'Asian' and 'American' aspects of Asian American identity." The Poetry Foundation called the book "Mesmerizingly detailed" and said Xie's writing avoided "hackneyed epiphanies about ancestral identity". Similarly, The Times Literary Supplement said Xie's writing evaded known pitfalls in some Chinese American writing—trauma porn, self-Orientalizing, among others—"through self-interrogation, historical awareness, and a poetic rendering of cultural theory." RHINO said "With extraordinary tenderness, the collection pushes us to consider every possible sensation surrounding remembrance and collective memory."

Other critics paid attention to Xie's form and style. Victoria Chang, speaking on the book with Dean Rader for The Los Angeles Review of Books, said "When we met to discuss this book, we talked about how we admired Xie’s desire to play around with how the poems looked on the page." The Hong Kong Review, comparing the book to Xie's debut, wrote that "Although there are differences between the two books, Xie's language is impeccable, and she brings to the new book the same perfect diction and precision she did in Eye Level, with lines that could slice flesh and cut glass." Qiu Xiaolong told The New York Times that "In poetics, [Xie] chooses a uniquely working form, controlled language, to mold these inhuman experiences into an organic whole." Washington Square Review concluded "Amidst retention and erasure, Xie’s collection configures its own capacity for considering all manner of dissolutions, the trajectories endured by the body, the space created by the twists of language, and the eternity held within the collapsing measure of the tense."
