= O Bon =

2011 poetry collection by Brandon Shimoda

- Author: Brandon Shimoda
- Publisher: Litmus Press
- Pages: 92
- ISBN: 978-1-933959-13-9
- Preceded by: The Girl Without Arms
- Followed by: Portuguese

O Bon is a 2011 poetry collection by Brandon Shimoda, published by Litmus Press. It is his third book of poetry.

== Content ==
A Japanese American, Shimoda's family members experienced incarceration during World War II; many of his ancestors suffered from the atomic bombings of Hiroshima and Nagasaki. As such, many of the book's poems concern Shimoda's reflections on grief faced by the violence of the twentieth century. Some of the poem's modes include lyric poetry and elegy.

The book's title partially refers to Obon, a Buddhist practice of honoring ancestors through various practices including the Bon Odori dance.

== Critical reception ==
Boston Review observed Shimoda's relationship to various sacred forms—including elegy, lyric, and invocation—with his own familial loss, grief, and mourning. The reviewer concluded: "In short, O Bon is a plaintive, beautifully written collection. Shimoda offers readers a graceful synthesis of form and content, of autobiography and history, and of the personal and the divine."

CutBank similarly found that "Within this book, history laces together with dreams of history, life with projected lives, death with what happens after, sensory perception with extra-sense." The reviewer stated that the book's poetry was inextricable from the broader history of the atomic bombings of Hiroshima and Nagasaki and the subsequent Obon rituals concerning them. However, the reviewer resisted the impulse to romanticize Shimoda's grief, instead paying more attention to the movement of Shimoda's language.

The Academy of American Poets called the poems "spare, gorgeously crafted ... within and out of chilling landscapes", specifically observing Shimoda's relationship between his poetics and the broader history of both the atomics bombs and of the internment of Japanese Americans.
