= Long =

Long may refer to:

== Measurement ==
- Long, characteristic of something of great duration
- Long, characteristic of something of great length
- Longitude (abbreviation: long.), a geographic coordinate
- Longa (music), note value in early music mensural notation

== Places ==
=== Asia ===
- Long District, Laos
- Long District, Phrae, Thailand
- Longjiang (disambiguation) or River Long (lit. "dragon river"), one of several rivers in China
- Yangtze River or Changjiang (lit. "Long River"), China

=== Elsewhere ===
- Long, Somme, France

== People ==
- Long (Chinese surname)
- Long (Western surname)

=== Fictional characters ===
- Long (Bloody Roar), in the video game series
- Long, Aeon of Permanence in Honkai: Star Rail

== Sports ==
- Long, a fielding term in cricket
- Long, in tennis and similar games, beyond the service line during a serve and beyond the baseline during play
- Annalong F.C., a football club in Northern Ireland nicknamed 'The Long'

== Other uses ==
- USS Long, a U.S. Navy ship name
- Long (finance), a position in finance, especially stock markets
- Lòng, name for a laneway in Shanghai
- Long integer, a computer data type denoted by long in many programming languages
- Lóng, pinyin transliteration of 龍 or 龙, the Chinese characters for "Chinese dragon"

== See also ==
- Length (disambiguation)
- Long County (disambiguation)
- Long Island (disambiguation)
- Long Lake (disambiguation)
- Long Mountain (disambiguation)
- Justice Long (disambiguation)
- "Long, Long, Long", a 1968 song by The Beatles
- Long long, a type of integer data type in computing
- Longleng a district of Phom people in Nagaland, India
- Short (disambiguation)
