= How to Communicate =

2022 debut poetry collection by John Lee Clark

How to Communicate: Poems
- Author: John Lee Clark
- Publisher: W. W. Norton & Company
- Publication date: December 6, 2022
- ISBN: 978-1324035343
- Followed by: Touch the Future: A Manifesto in Essays

How to Communicate: Poems is a debut 2022 poetry collection by John Lee Clark, published by W. W. Norton & Company. It won the 2023 Minnesota Book Award for Poetry and was designated as a finalist for the 2023 National Book Award for Poetry.

== Contents and background ==
Clark is a DeafBlind person who lost his vision during his adolescent years and an advocate of the Protactile language, a touch-based language. Clark writes extensively on Protactile in his other book, Touch the Future: A Manifesto in Essays.

Clark's debut poetry collection, in six parts, similarly addresses DeafBlind identity, linguistics, family, and community through its poems. It also includes translated poetry from Protactile and American Sign Language.

== Critical reception ==
Many critics lauded Clark's approach to touch. For the Canadian Journal of Disability Studies, Kristin Snoddon said "How to Communicate is full of such surprises and revelations. It pulses with life. I recommend it for all scholars of disability, language and literature, and anyone seeking to draw inspiration and understanding from alternate ways of engaging with the world." RHINO wrote that "Clark depicts the importance of touch in communicating with people and his surroundings. He does this both through his own experiences and by showing the power of an often-undervalued sense." Wordgathering stated "In his stunning, freeing, and riveting debut poetry collection, the reader immediately encounters the bold and vivid juxtaposition of Clark’s aesthetics and politics."

Other critics said Clark's work was pushing the boundary of poetry's possibilities. The Los Angeles Review of Books observed Clark's "poetics rooted in DeafBlind sensibility" and said "Many of the poems in How to Communicate are reimaginings of problematic and ableist poems about Deaf and blind people from earlier eras; in one section of the book, Clark offers translations in English of poems originally composed in Protactile or American Sign Language." Long River Review said "All in all, I think that poets like John Lee Clark are completely changing the genre of poetry– and they should be more highly recognized because of it." Rain Taxi concluded that "Clark hasn’t just put his life into verse and prose poems; he’s felt and manipulated and explored and expanded what poetry in English—in print, to the ear, on the fingertip—can do."
