= Long Island (disambiguation) =

Long Island is a densely populated island in the southeastern geographical area of the State of New York.

Long Island may also refer to:

== Australia ==
- Long Island (New South Wales), an island in the Hawkesbury River north of Sydney, New South Wales
- Long Island (Broad Sound Islands), Queensland
- Long Island (Whitsunday Islands), Queensland
- Long Island (Tasmania), an island in eastern Bass Strait
- Long Islet (Tasmania), an islet in northern Bass Strait
- Long Island (Western Australia), an island in King Sound, Kimberley region
- Long Island, an island in the River Murray in South Australia
  - Long Island Recreation Park, South Australia

== Bahamas ==
- Long Island, Bahamas, an island and a district of the Bahamas
- Long Island (Bahamas Parliament constituency)

== Canada ==
- Long Island (British Columbia), on Harrison Lake
- Long Island (Frobisher Bay, Nunavut), off the coast of Baffin Island
- Long Island (Gull Lake), near Gravenhurst, Ontario
- Long Island (Hermitage Bay, Newfoundland)
- Long Island (Hudson Bay, Nunavut), off the coast of Quebec
- Long Island (Kings County), in the Kennebecasis River near Rothesay, New Brunswick
- Long Island (Nova Scotia)
- Long Island (Placentia Bay, Newfoundland and Labrador)
- Long Island, in Rice Lake (Ontario)
- Long Island, in the Rideau River, Ontario

== New Zealand ==
- Long Island, Marlborough
- Long Island, Southland

== United Kingdom ==
- Long Island (Dorset), Poole Harbour, Dorset, England
- Long Island (Hampshire), England
- Outer Hebrides, sometimes referred to as "The Long Island" in Scotland
- Long Island, County Down, a townland in County Down, Northern Ireland
- Long Island, County Fermanagh, a townland in County Fermanagh, Northern Ireland

== United States ==
- Long Island, Alabama, a community
- Long Island (Alaska), an island in the Alexander Archipelago
- Long Island (California), an island in the Sacramento–San Joaquin River Delta
- Long Island (Connecticut), an island in the Housatonic River
- Long Island, Florida, a barrier island
- Long Island, Kansas, a city
- Long Island, Maine, a town and island
- Long Island (Maryland), an island in Chesapeake Bay
- Long Island (Cecil County, Maryland), an island in Maryland
- Long Island (Massachusetts), the longest island in Boston Harbor
- Long Island, the largest island in New Hampshire, located on Lake Winnipesaukee
- Long Island, New York, an island and geographical area
  - Long Island AVA, a New York wine region
  - Long Island City, an area of Queens County, New York
  - Long Island (proposed state), various proposals for a new American state on the island
  - Long Island Sound, tidal estuary on the North Shore of Long Island
- Long Island, North Carolina, a community
- Long Island Beach, a former amusement park in Whitewater Township, Ohio
- Isle of Palms, South Carolina, formerly known as Long Island
- Long Island (Tennessee), an island in the Holston River
- Long Island, Virginia, a town
- Long Island (Washington), in Willapa Bay
- Long Island (Wisconsin), one of the Apostle Islands in Lake Superior

== Elsewhere ==
- Long Island (Antarctica)
- Long Island, Antigua
- Long Island, Bermuda
- Bleaker Island, Falkland Islands, also called Long Island
- Long Island, Andaman, India, an island and county in the Andaman Archipelago
- Long Island, County Cork, Ireland
- Long Island, an island in Jamaica
- North Long Island and South Long Island, two islands of the Penguin Islands, Namibia
- Long Island (Papua New Guinea)
- Long Island, Seychelles
- Long Island, Sri Lanka

== Other uses ==
- Long Island iced tea, an alcoholic mixed drink
- USS Long Island, three United States Navy ships
- Long Island Ducks (disambiguation), several sports teams
- Long Island Military Reservation (disambiguation)
- Long Island Railroad (disambiguation)
- Long Island, 2024 novel by Colm Tóibín

== See also ==
- Ile Longue (Peros Banhos) ("Long Island"), an island in the Chagos Archipelago, British Indian Ocean Territory
- Changdao County (Chinese:长岛县, literally translated as "Long Island" County), in Shandong Province, China
- Dugi Otok ("Long Island"), Croatia, in the Adriatic Sea
- Makronisos ("Long Island"), Greece, in the Aegean Sea
- Île Longue (French for "Long Island")
- Lang Island, Indonesia
- Lon Gisland, an EP by Beirut
