= Île Longue (disambiguation) =

Île Longue is peninsula in France

Île Longue (French for "Long Island") may also refer to:

- Ile Longue (Peros Banhos)
- Île Longue (Kerguelen Islands)

== See also ==
- Long Island (disambiguation)
