= Long River =

Long River may refer to:

- The Yangtze River, from the literal translation of its usual Chinese name Changjiang (长江)
- Any of several rivers named Long (龍江, meaning "Dragon River")
- Long Island River (Minnesota), a river of Minnesota, US
- Long River (Guangxi), a river system in Guangxi Province, China
- Long River, Prince Edward Island, a community in Canada

== See also ==
- List of rivers by length
- Long River Review, an American literary magazine
