= Longjiang =

Longjiang is the atonal pinyin romanization of various Chinese names, particularly 龍江 or 龙江, meaning "Dragon River". The same name also sometimes occurs as Lung Chiang, Keang, or Kiang. It may refer to:

== Places ==
=== Rivers ===
- Long River (Guangxi)
- Long River (Fujian)
- Jiulong River, a river in southern Fujian formerly known as the Longjiang

=== Provinces ===
- Longjiang Province, a former province in Heilongjiang

=== Counties ===
- Longjiang County in Qiqihar Prefecture, Heilongjiang

=== Subdistricts ===
- Longjiang Subdistrict, Fuqing, Fujian
- Longjiang Subdistrict, Linghe District, in the city of Jinzhou

=== Towns ===
- Longjiang, Huilai County (隆江镇), Huilai County, Guangdong
- Longjiang, Shunde, Foshan, Guangdong
- Longjiang, Qionghai, Hainan
- Longjiang, Yongfu County, Guangxi

=== Villages ===
- Longjiang, Zhejiang, a former village renamed Longgang

== Other ==
- Longjiang-1 and Longjiang-2, two Chinese microsatellites launched in May 2018 with the Queqiao satellite
- Lung Chiang, a US built patrol boat of the Republic of China Navy
- Longjiang Formation, Lower Cretaceous Formation in Inner Mongolia.

== See also ==
- Long River (disambiguation)
- Long Jiang
- Long (disambiguation)
- Jiang (disambiguation)
- The dictionary definition of 龍 at Wiktionary
- The dictionary definition of 龙 at Wiktionary
- The dictionary definition of 江 at Wiktionary
