= Haikou, Fujian =

Haikou 海口镇
- Town
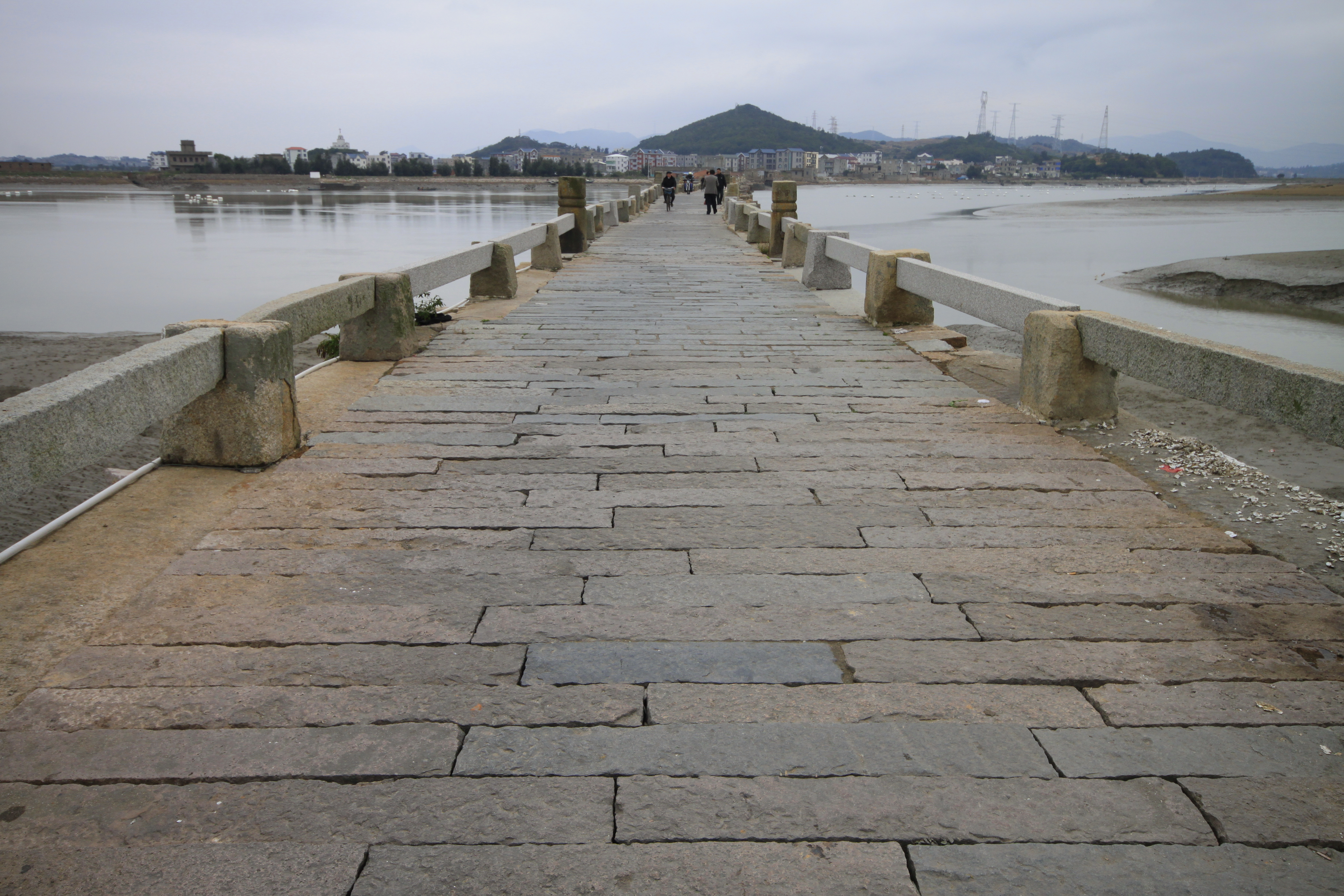
- Longjiang Bridge over the estuary of the Long River in Haikou

- Location in Fujian Haikou (China)
- Coordinates (Haikou Town government): 25°41′50″N 119°27′55″E
- Country: People's Republic of China
- Province: Fujian
- Prefecture-level city: Fuzhou
- County-level city: Fuqing

Area
  - Total: 52.64 km^{2} (20.32 sq mi)

Population (2018)
  - Total: 78,882
  - Density: 1,499/km^{2} (3,881/sq mi)
- Time zone: UTC+8 (China Standard)
- Postal code: 350300
- Area code: 0591

Haikou (Chinese: 海口镇; pinyin: Hǎikǒu Zhèn) is a town in Fuqing, Fuzhou, Fujian Province, China. The town is located in the eastern portion of the city of Fuqing, covering 52.64 square kilometres (20.32 sq mi), and has a hukou population of 78,882 as of 2018.

== Administrative divisions ==
The town has jurisdiction over 1 residential community (Chinese: 社区) and 19 administrative villages (Chinese: 行政村).

The town's sole residential community is Haikou Community (海口社区), which serves as its administrative center.

The town's administrative villages are Yunguang (云光村), Niuzhai (牛宅村), Qian (前村), Chengli (城里村), Douyuan (斗垣村), Haikou Village (海口村), Houlu (后路村), Chenguang (晨光村), Lixin (立新村), Dongjiao (东峤村), Dongqi (东岐村), Wuyu (梧屿村), Licuo (李厝村), Nancuo (南厝村), Dongge (东阁村), Cendou (岑兜村), Yangban (洋坂村), Shixi (石溪村), and Gongnong (工农村).

== Demographics ==
Haikou was home to 78,888 residents as of 2012.

== See also ==
- List of township-level divisions of Fujian
