= Long River (Fujian) =

River in Fujian, China

Coordinates: 26.0494°N 119.635°E

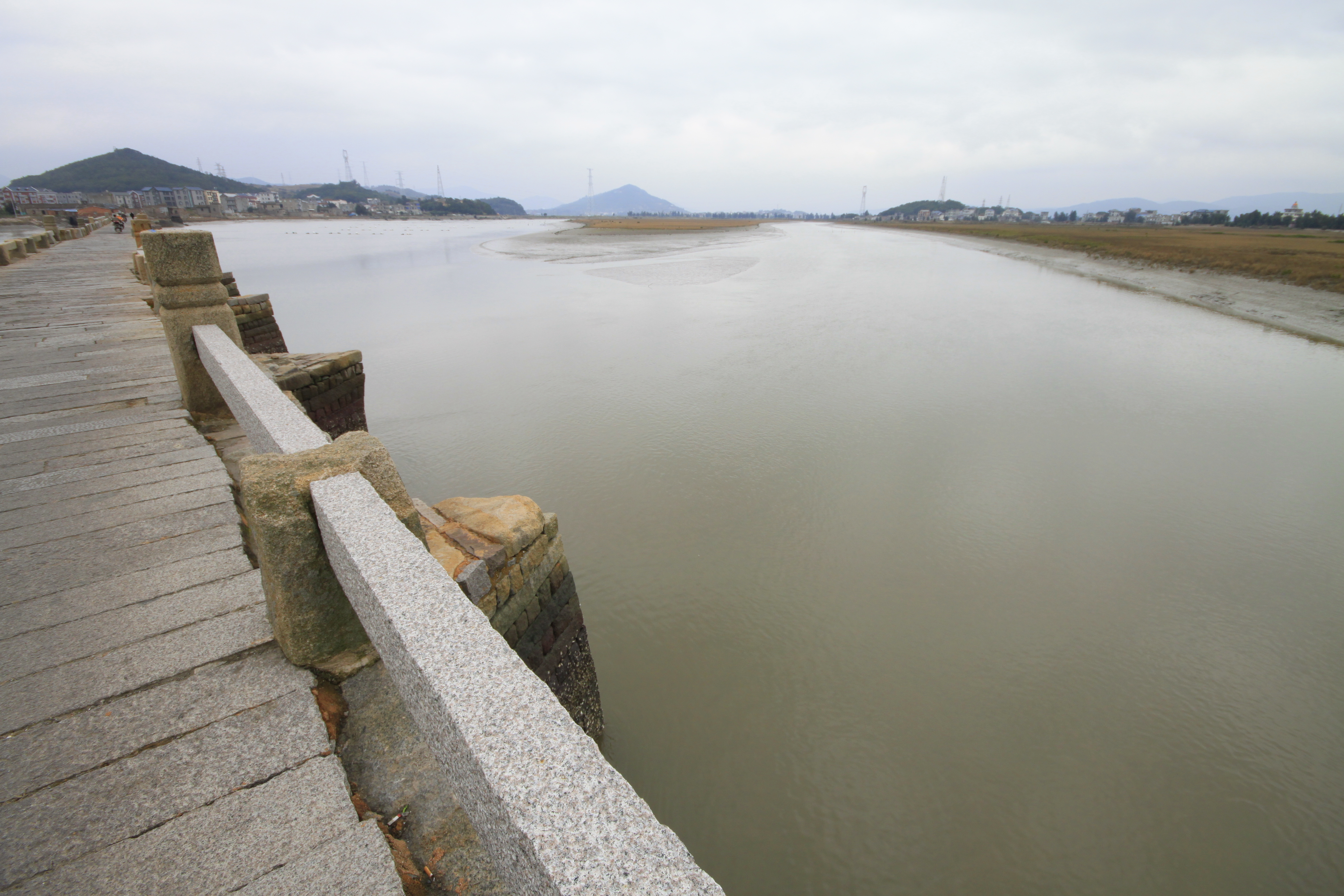
- The Long River estuary at Haikou, spanned by the Longjiang Bridge
- Traditional Chinese: 龍江
- Simplified Chinese: 龙江
- Literal meaning: Dragon River
Transcriptions
Standard Mandarin
- Hanyu Pinyin: Lóngjiāng

The Long River or Longjiang is a river in Fujian Province, China. It starts in Putian's Hanjiang District and crosses into neighboring Fuqing in Fuzhou, where it flows into the Taiwan Strait at Haikou.

The river is dammed upstream of Honglu. The dam forms the Dongzhang Reservoir, on the northern shore of which Dongzhang is located.

The Longjiang Bridge, one in the chain of famous Song bridges on the Fujian coastal road, spans the river near its mouth.

== See also ==
- List of rivers in China
- Other Longjiangs
