= John Lee Clark =

American poet

- Born: 1978 (age 47–48); Minnesota, U.S.
- Education: Minnesota State Academy for the Deaf; Gallaudet University
- Occupations: Poet; writer; activist; Protactile educator
- Spouse: Adrean Clark
- Children: 3
- Writing career
- Language: American Sign Language; English
- Genres: Poetry; Essays
- Notable works: How to Communicate (2022); Touch the Future: A Manifesto in Essays (2023)
- Notable awards: National Magazine Award (2020); National Book Award for Poetry Finalist (2023); Minnesota Book Award for Poetry (2023)
- Movement: Protactile
- Website: johnleeclark.com

John Lee Clark (born 1978) is an American deafblind poet, essayist, and activist from Minnesota. He is the author of Suddenly Slow (2008), Where I Stand: On the Signing Community and My DeafBlind Experience (2014), How to Communicate (2022), and Touch the Future: A Manifesto in Essays (2023), and the editor of the anthologies Deaf American Poetry (2009) and Deaf Lit Extravaganza (2013). He is a prominent activist in the Protactile movement.

== Early life and education ==
Clark was born into a Deaf and signing family and became blind later in life. His native language is American Sign Language, and he did not learn to read English until he was twelve years old. He started to become blind as an adolescent. He is a second-generation DeafBlind person.

Clark graduated from the Minnesota State Academy for the Deaf and attended Gallaudet University.

== Career ==
Clark is a Braille and ProTactile instructor. In 2024, he moved to Montreal to pursue a Ph.D. at Concordia University and has continued his advocacy for the Protactile movement there.

== Works ==
Clark is the author of two books of poems, Suddenly Slow (2008) and How to Communicate (2022), and two collections of essays, Where I Stand: On the Signing Community and My DeafBlind Experience (Handtype Press, 2014) and Touch the Future: A Manifesto in Essays (Norton, 2023). He is the editor of anthologies Deaf American Poetry (Gallaudet University Press, 2009) and Deaf Lit Extravaganza (Handtype Press, 2013). His work is included in the anthologies Beauty Is a Verb: The New Poetry of Disability, Deaf American Prose, St. Paul Almanac, and The Nodin Anthology of Poetry.

Clark gave a performative demonstration of protactile poetry at the April 2019 festival I wanna be with you everywhere at Performance Space New York. Using protactile language, he delivered poetry on stage alongside fellow DeafBlind poets Rhonda Voight-Campbell and Hayley Broadway.

Clark is a frequent contributor to Poetry magazine and maintains a blog on his website, where he frequently writes short essays on DeafBlind subjects.

== Activism and views ==
Clark has expressed frustrations with the limited range of literature available in Braille. He advocates for shorter copyright terms after authors' deaths in order for texts to be accessible in more formats. Clark says reading mostly older literature, due to that being the main thing he has been able to access, has influenced his writing and style.

Clark wrote an article for The Chronicle of Higher Education in 2010 critical of the failure of colleges to accommodate blind and DeafBlind students.

Clark is an activist for the advancement of Protactile, a fully kinesthetic language.

== Recognition and awards ==
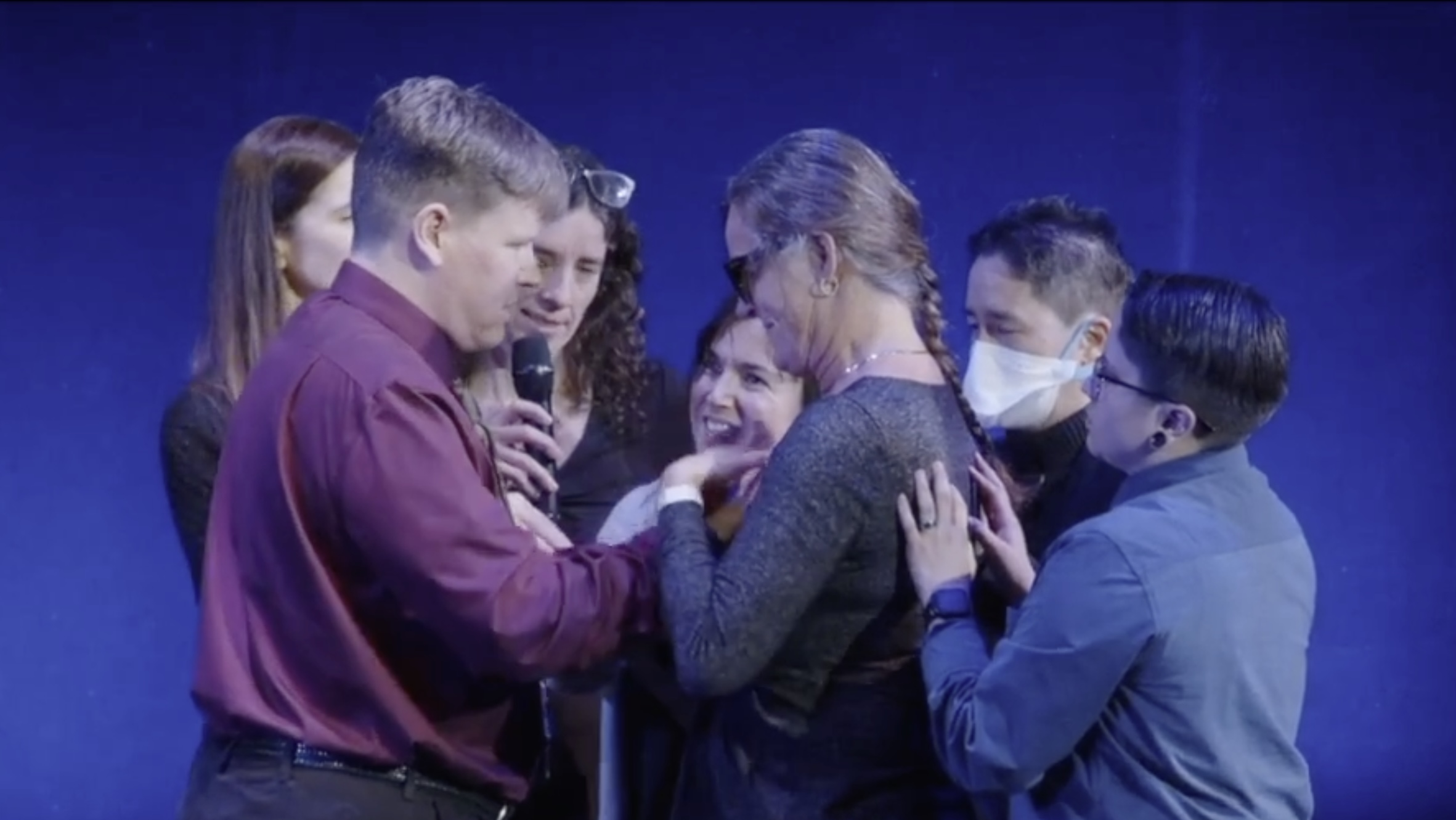
Clark, left, at the 2023 National Book Awards Finalist Reading with Protactile interpreters Ahyicodae, Halene Anderson, Maria Becerra, Cristina Hartmann, and Jelica Nuccio.

Clark has won grants and fellowships from the Minnesota State Arts Board, VSA Minnesota, the Laurent Clerc Cultural Fund, Intermedia Arts Center, and The Loft Literary Center. He was a featured writer at the Deaf Way II International Cultural Arts Festival, and was a finalist for the 2016 Split This Rock Freedom Plow Award for Poetry and Activism.

Clark's essay "Tactile Art" appeared in Poetry magazine in October 2019 and won the 2020 National Magazine Award for Essays and Criticism.

Clark's poetry collection How to Communicate (2022) was a finalist for the 2023 National Book Award for Poetry. It won the 2023 Minnesota Book Award for Poetry.

== Personal life ==
Clark has Usher syndrome. He is married to the artist Adrean Clark and they have three sons.
