= Fuqing =

City in Fujian, China

Fuqing 福清市 Futsing
- County-level city
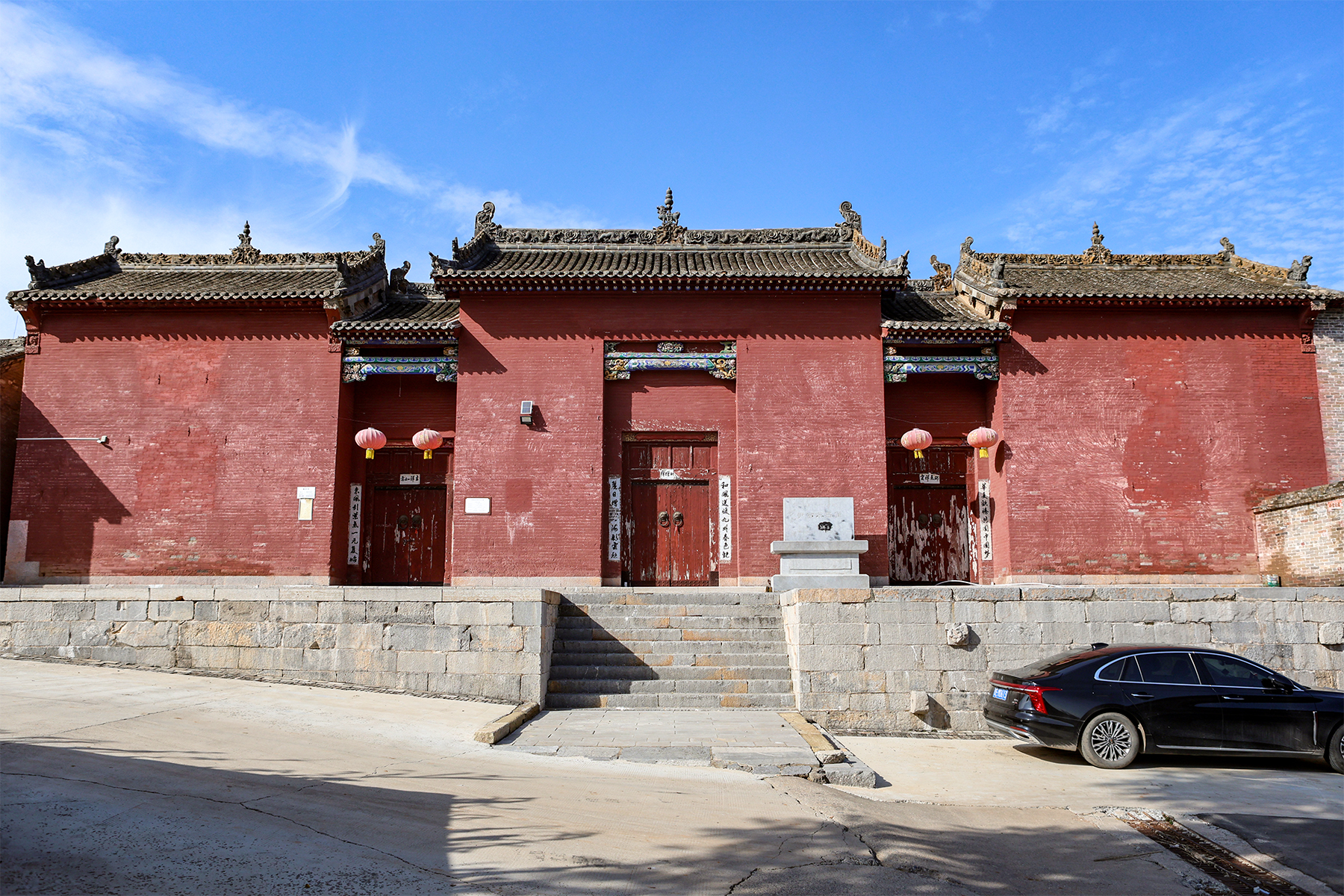
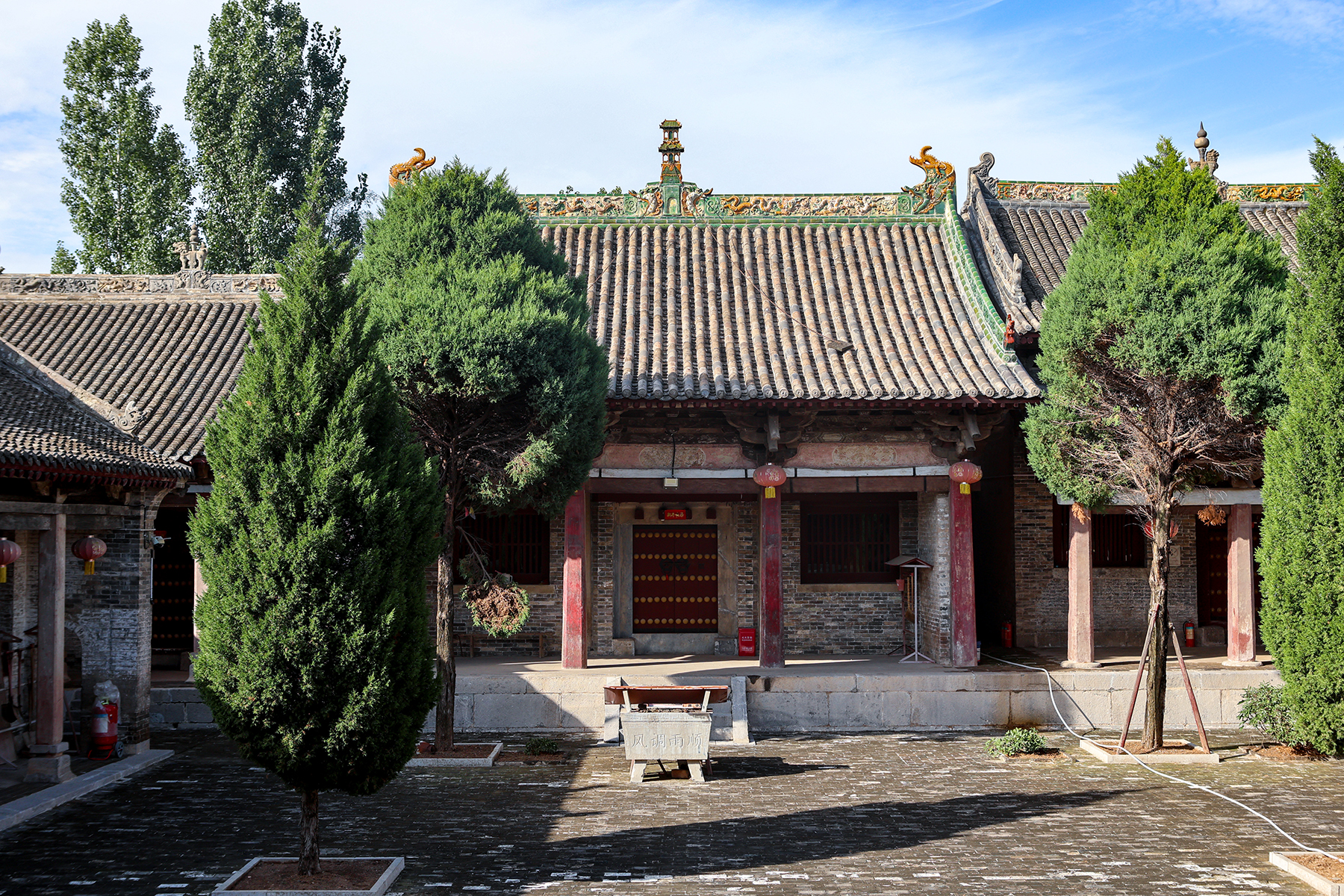
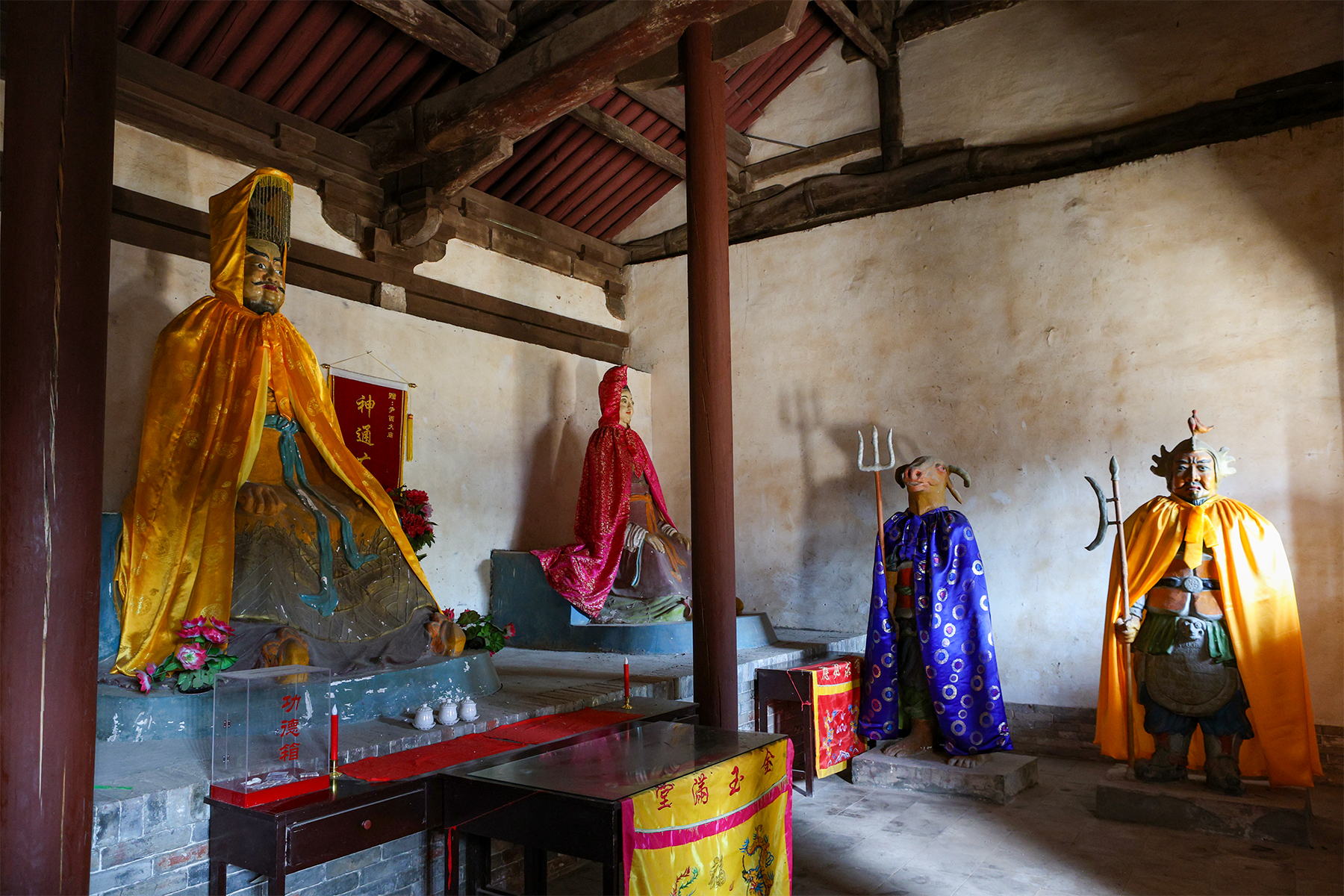
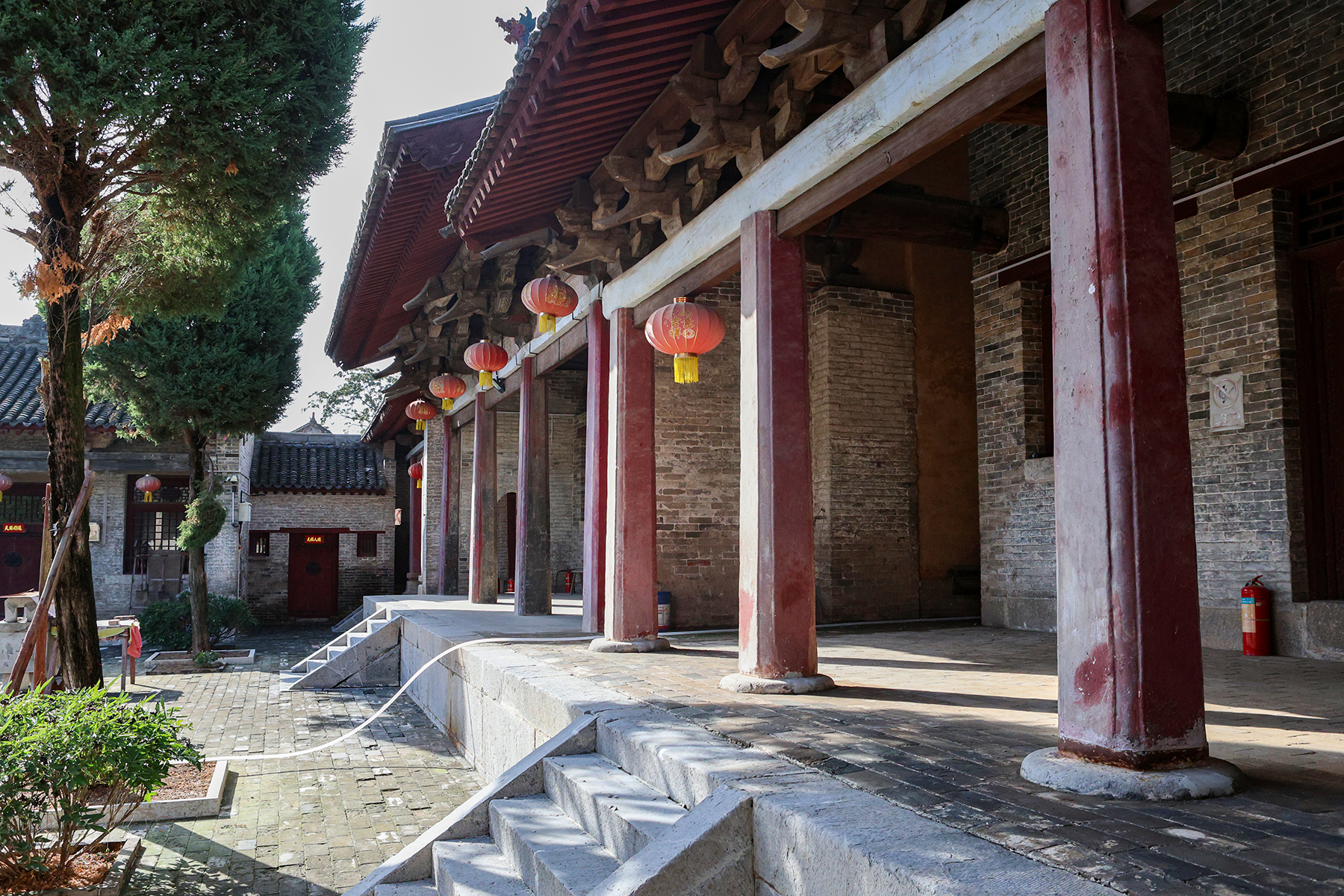
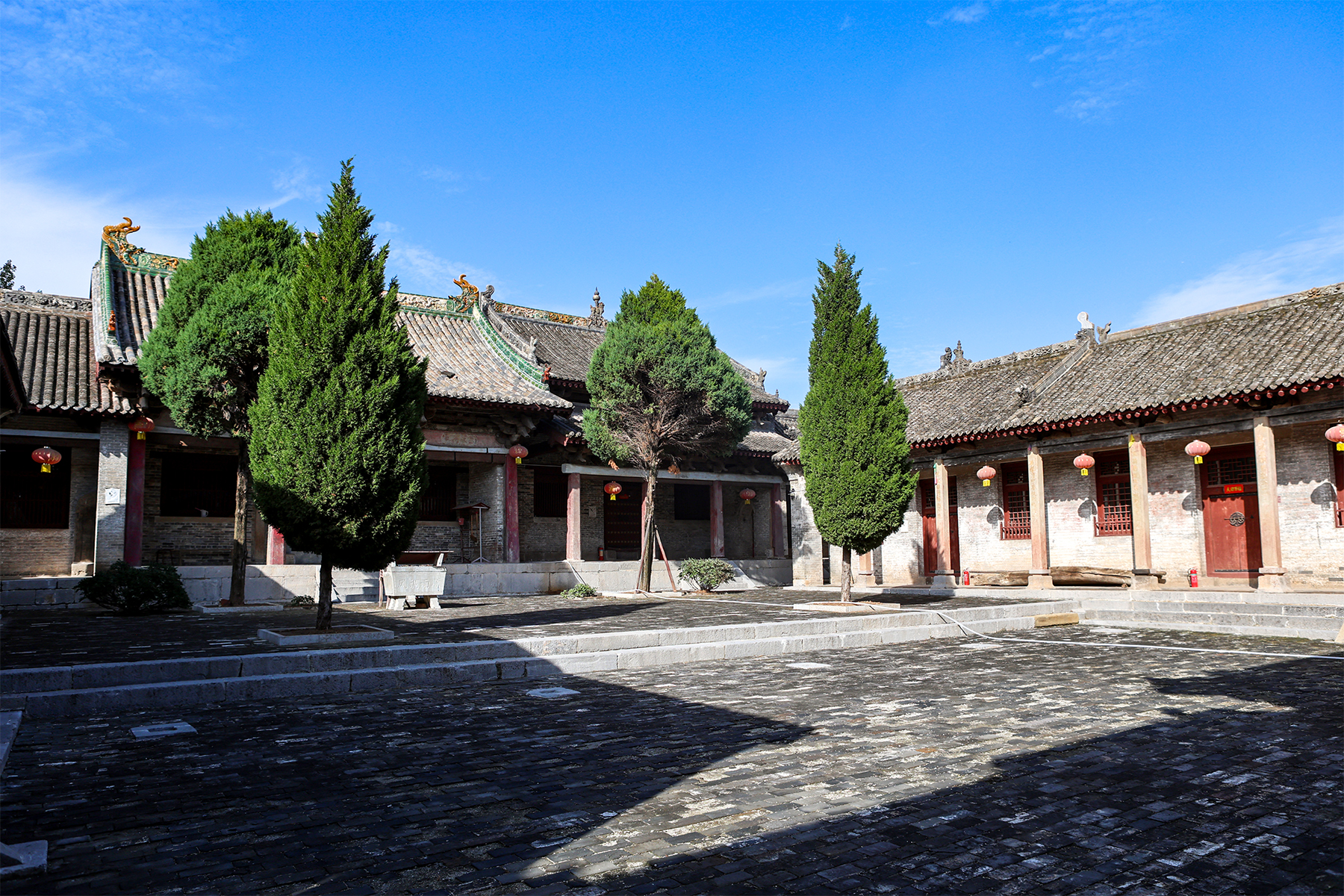
- On the Longjiang River in Downtown Fuqing

- Location of the city centre in Fujian
- Coordinates: 25°43′N 119°23′E
- Country: People's Republic of China
- Province: Fujian
- Prefecture-level city: Fuzhou

Population (2020)
  - County-level city: 1,390,487
  - Urban: 744,774
  - Rural: 645,713
- Time zone: UTC+8 (CST)
- Postal code: 350181
- GDP (nominal): 2018
- Total: ¥110.21 billion ($16 billion)
  - Per capita: ¥84,105 ($12,709)
  - Growth: ▲9.6%
- Website: www.fuqing.gov.cn

Fuqing (Chinese: 福清; pinyin: Fúqīng; Wade–Giles: Fu^{2}-ch'ing^{1}; Foochow Romanized: Hók-chiăng; also romanized as Hokchia) is a county-level city of Fujian Province, China. It is under the administration of the prefecture-level city of Fuzhou.

== Geography ==
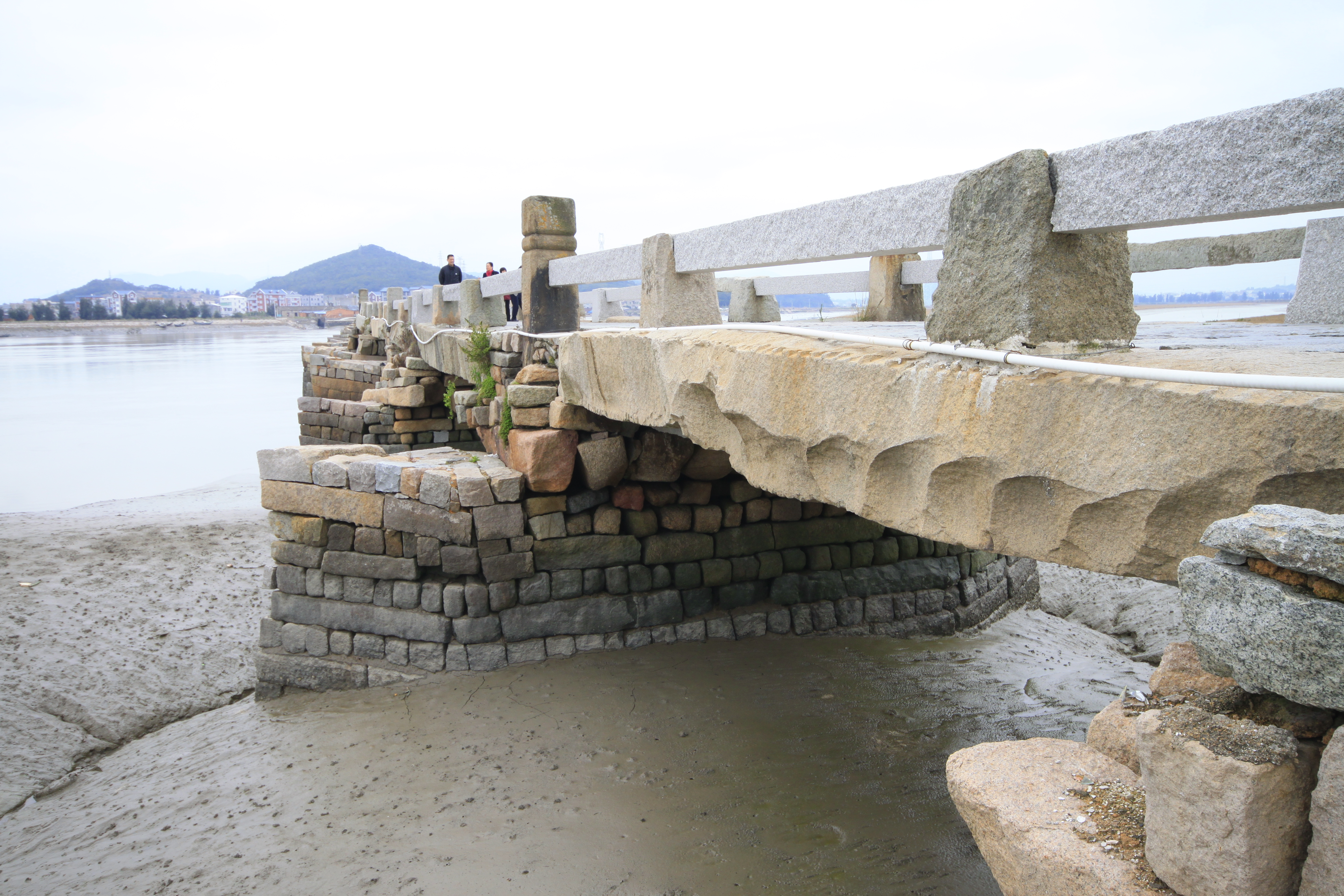
The Lóng River Bridge near the river mouth of the eponymous river in Haikou, dating from the Song dynasty.

Fuqing is located on the north-central section of the coast of Fujian, south of the urban area of Fuzhou and north of Putian. It is the southernmost administrative division of Fuzhou on the mainland and is the only county-level city under the administration of Fuzhou. To the northwest of Fuqing lies Yongtai County, on its northern border is Minhou County, and to its northeast is the district of Changle. The entire southwestern land border is shared with Hanjiang, Putian. The territory of Fuqing also includes over 100 islands, and is connected by road to the major islands of Pingtan County.

The highest point of Fuqing is Guya Peak (Chinese: 古崖山尾; pinyin: Gǔyá Shānwěi), which is situated on its border with Minhou County to the north, and has a height of 1,003 metres (3,291 ft) above sea level. The northern part of the county-level city is situated in the valley of the Long River (simplified Chinese: 龙江; traditional Chinese: 龍江; pinyin: Lóngjiāng; trans. "Dragon River"), which includes the city's central urban area.

Fuqing has a long indented coastline on the Taiwan Strait, mostly consisting of rocky shores. A prominent part of its territory is the Longgao Peninsula (龙高半岛; 龍高半島; Lóng-Gāo Bàndǎo), named for two of its major towns, Longtian and Gaoshan. This peninsula also forms two major bays: Fuqing Bay (福清湾; 福清灣; Fúqīng Wān) to its north, and Xinghua Bay (兴化湾; 興化灣; Xīnghuà Wān) to its south. The jagged coastline has given rise to a multitude of harbors and ports, including Haikou, situated at the mouth of the Lóng.

== Climate ==
Climate data for Fuqing, elevation 75 m (246 ft), (1991–2020 normals, extremes 1981–present)
| Month | Jan | Feb | Mar | Apr | May | Jun | Jul | Aug | Sep | Oct | Nov | Dec | Year |
|---|---|---|---|---|---|---|---|---|---|---|---|---|---|
| Record high °C (°F) | 27.0 (80.6) | 29.3 (84.7) | 30.2 (86.4) | 31.2 (88.2) | 33.0 (91.4) | 35.1 (95.2) | 36.4 (97.5) | 37.2 (99.0) | 37.1 (98.8) | 33.7 (92.7) | 30.8 (87.4) | 27.6 (81.7) | 37.2 (99.0) |
| Mean daily maximum °C (°F) | 15.3 (59.5) | 15.8 (60.4) | 18.4 (65.1) | 22.9 (73.2) | 26.7 (80.1) | 29.8 (85.6) | 32.6 (90.7) | 32.4 (90.3) | 30.2 (86.4) | 26.1 (79.0) | 22.1 (71.8) | 17.5 (63.5) | 24.2 (75.5) |
| Daily mean °C (°F) | 11.7 (53.1) | 12.0 (53.6) | 14.3 (57.7) | 18.8 (65.8) | 23.0 (73.4) | 26.4 (79.5) | 28.9 (84.0) | 28.6 (83.5) | 26.7 (80.1) | 22.8 (73.0) | 18.9 (66.0) | 14.1 (57.4) | 20.5 (68.9) |
| Mean daily minimum °C (°F) | 9.4 (48.9) | 9.5 (49.1) | 11.6 (52.9) | 15.9 (60.6) | 20.3 (68.5) | 24.1 (75.4) | 26.2 (79.2) | 26.0 (78.8) | 24.2 (75.6) | 20.4 (68.7) | 16.6 (61.9) | 11.7 (53.1) | 18.0 (64.4) |
| Record low °C (°F) | 0.5 (32.9) | 1.3 (34.3) | 0.3 (32.5) | 6.7 (44.1) | 11.0 (51.8) | 15.9 (60.6) | 20.5 (68.9) | 21.5 (70.7) | 16.0 (60.8) | 10.9 (51.6) | 6.2 (43.2) | −0.3 (31.5) | −0.3 (31.5) |
| Average precipitation mm (inches) | 47.0 (1.85) | 75.9 (2.99) | 113.2 (4.46) | 126.4 (4.98) | 169.4 (6.67) | 296.8 (11.69) | 177.2 (6.98) | 252.7 (9.95) | 157.7 (6.21) | 53.5 (2.11) | 41.7 (1.64) | 37.8 (1.49) | 1,549.3 (61.02) |
| Average precipitation days (≥ 0.1 mm) | 7.8 | 10.9 | 15.1 | 14.3 | 16.0 | 15.5 | 10.3 | 13.0 | 11.5 | 6.5 | 7.0 | 7.2 | 135.1 |
| Average snowy days | 0.1 | 0.1 | 0 | 0 | 0 | 0 | 0 | 0 | 0 | 0 | 0 | 0 | 0.2 |
| Average relative humidity (%) | 71 | 74 | 75 | 76 | 78 | 81 | 77 | 77 | 74 | 69 | 70 | 68 | 74 |
| Mean monthly sunshine hours | 103.2 | 91.0 | 103.2 | 117.8 | 127.1 | 143.6 | 233.3 | 208.9 | 170.7 | 159.0 | 115.2 | 113.9 | 1,686.9 |
| Percentage possible sunshine | 31 | 29 | 28 | 31 | 31 | 35 | 56 | 52 | 47 | 45 | 36 | 35 | 38 |
Source: China Meteorological Administration

== Administrative divisions ==
Subdistricts

- Yuping Subdistrict (玉屏街道) - city center, and location of the city government
- Longshan Subdistrict (龙山街道)
- Longjiang Subdistrict (龙江街道)
- Yinxi Subdistrict (音西街道) - western part of the main urban area
- Honglu Subdistrict (宏路街道)
- Shizhu Subdistrict (石竹街道)
- Yangxia Subdistrict (阳下街道)

Towns

- Haikou (海口镇),
- Chengtou (城头镇),
- Nanling (南岭镇),
- Longtian (龙田镇),
- Jiangjing (江镜镇),
- Gangtou (港头镇),
- Gaoshan (高山镇),
- Shabu (沙埔镇),
- Sanshan (三山镇),
- Donghan (东瀚镇),
- Yuxi (Yuki) (渔溪镇),
- Shangjing (上迳镇),
- Xincuo (新厝镇),
- Jiangyin (江阴镇),
- Dongzhang (东张镇),
- Jingyang (镜洋镇),
- Yidu (一都镇)

== Economy ==
As of 2022, Fuqing's Nominal GDP was US$24.6 billion (CN¥160 billion), ranked 4th among county-level administrative units in Fujian province; its Nominal GDP per capita was US$17,702 (CN¥115,067).

Industries that contribute to GDP for 2017:

| Industry | GDP percentage |
|---|---|
| IT manufacturing (Monitor, TV, and related) | 20.4% |
| Food processing (Grilled Eel, Seafood etc.) | 13.4% |
| Pipe and Conduit material | 8.5% |
| Chemical materials | 7.9% |
| Power plant | 4.3% |
| Auto & construction Glass | 3.4% |
| Textile | 3.2% |
| Medicine manufacturing | 1.6% |
| Retail & others | 34.6% |

Total GDP:

| YEAR | GDP Amount |
|---|---|
| 2022 | 160B CNY (about 24.6 billion in USD) |
| 2021 | 141.4B CNY (about 21.7 billion in USD) |
| 2020 | 122.854B CNY (about 18.9 billion in USD) |
| 2019 | 115B CNY (about 17.6 billion in USD) |
| 2018 | 110.21B CNY (about $16 billion in USD) |
| 2017 | 99.661B CNY |
| 2016 | 85.921B CNY |

== Overseas migration ==
Fuqing, a long-established Qiaoxiang (侨乡: Hometown of Overseas Chinese), is together with most of Fujian, known for its large number of emigrants, or huaqiao. The first wave of emigration started in late 19th century; the most common destinations during that time were Indonesia, Singapore, and East Malaysia. Some became among the richest men in Southeast Asia, e.g. Sudono Salim (Salim Group), Hendra Rahardja, Rachman Halim (Gudang Garam), Henry Kwee Hian Liong (Pontiac Land Group).

Overseas Fuqingese assembled into associations for mutual support, including the International Association of Fuqing, Perkumpulan Fuqing (Indonesia), and Singapore Futsing Association.

== Local dialect ==
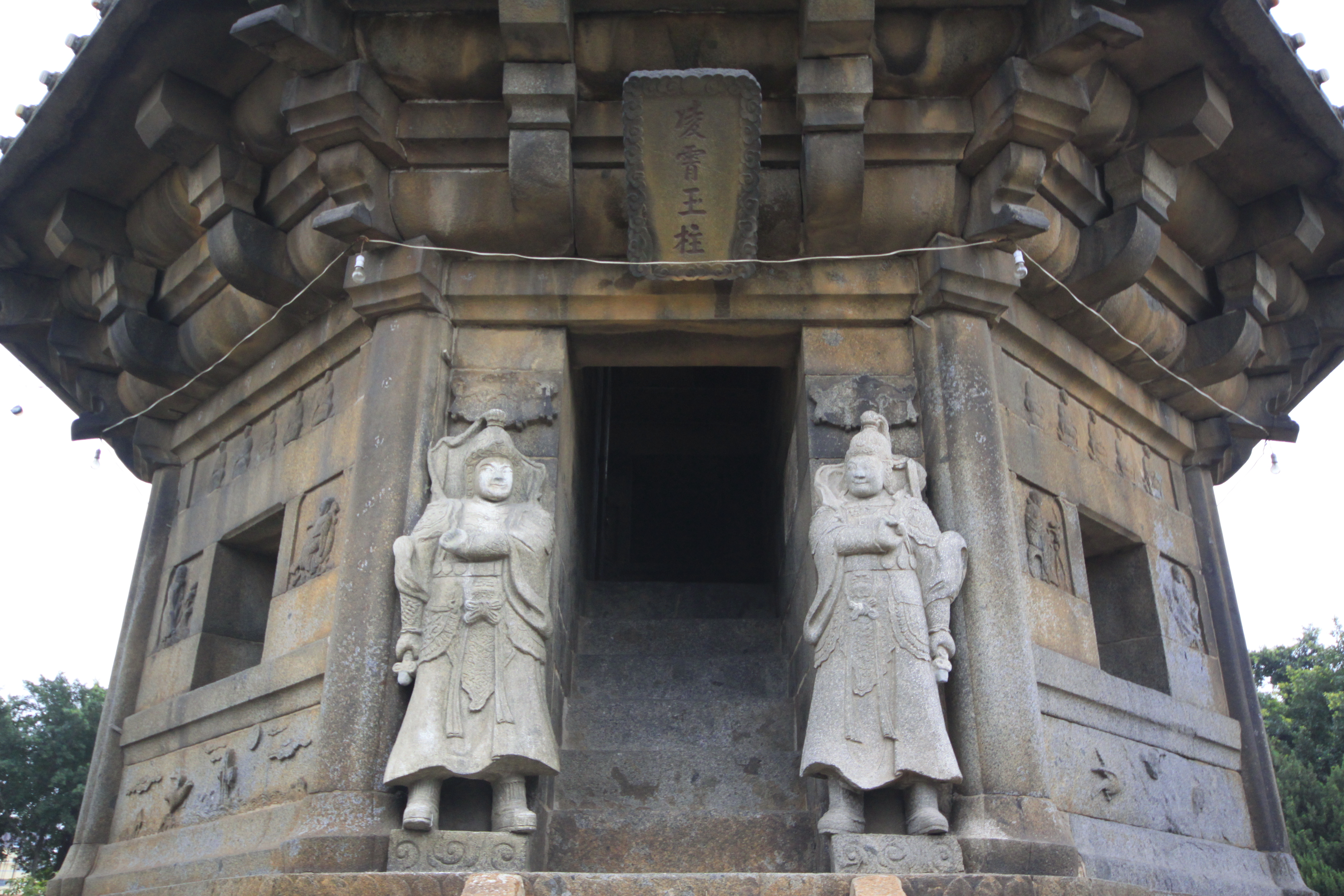
Guardian figures, Ruiyun Pagoda (zh:瑞云塔). Late Ming Dynasty

Fuqing has its own dialect (simplified Chinese: 福清话; traditional Chinese: 福清話; pinyin: Fúqīnghuà, Bàng-uâ-cê: Hók-chiăng-uâ, IPA in the local dialect: /huʔ˥ tsʰiaŋ˥ ŋuɑ˦˨/), classified as part of the Houguan branch of Eastern Min. It is closely related to the Fuzhou dialect, and the two are mutually intelligible to quite a high extent, although not completely. Notably, the Fuqing dialect uses the final /yoŋ/ where Fuzhou generally uses /uoŋ/; most of Fuqing uses the interdental fricative /θ/ where most of Fuzhou uses /s/; and there are differences in the pitch values of the tones. Due to the hilly terrain and the isolation between villages, there is also a large amount of internal dialectal variation.

Most of its people can also speak Mandarin, which is used in schools, businesses, and to communicate with people from different parts of the province and of the country.

There are also scattered villages that speak predominantly Southern Min varieties, with their populations coming from the Jinjiang, Zhangpu and Hui'an, among other areas of southern Fujian. However, their dialects have diverged significantly from the mainstream Hokkien varieties, such as in the use of /y/ as a phoneme, and the use of vocabulary items closer to that of the Eastern Min varieties, such as 俊 (BUC: cóng, IPA: /tsoŋ/) instead of 媠 (POJ: súi) for "beautiful, good-looking".

In addition, there are villages that speak a form of Putian dialect, mostly near the border with Putian, with the distinctive use of /ɬ/ instead of /s/ or /θ/ more common in the Fuqing dialect.

== Regional foods ==
Fuqing is located in the coastal hills, subtropical climate, warm and rainy, but the river is short and shallow. Rich in species while not rich in harvest. Therefore, the important staple food in Fuqing is sweet potato. Non-staple food is dominated by various marine food. Many traditional snacks are made from sweet potato and seafood.

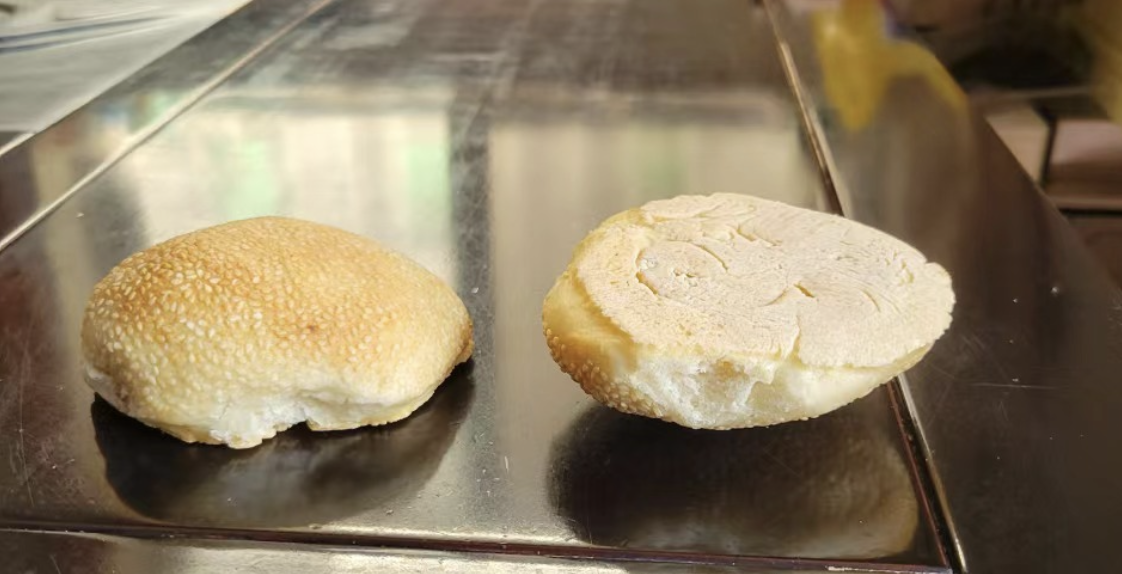
Fuqing Guangbing picture

Guangbing (光饼): Guangbing is a bread product that is baked and shaped like a sesame-seeded burger bun top. In 1562, the Japanese invaded Fujian province. General Qi Jiguang was charged to drive the invaders out of Fujian. In order not to let the meal time slow down their marching speed, General Qi invented a kind of bread which was shaped into a ring at that time, so his soldiers could wear a string of those breads around their neck. After the victory, the recipe of this bread product was spread throughout the province and named Guangbing after General Qi. Nowadays, there is no longer a hole in the center of a Guangbing, and there are various kinds of Guangbing developed in different areas in Fujian province, which don't look the same. Fuqing Guangbing is made of the flour, sugar and salt which are all locally produced, as well as the excellent Fuqing sesame seeds, which are very big and taste better than ordinary small sesame seeds. Guangbing was handed down by people to commemorate Qi Jiguang's achievements, which has been used and developed to this day. The people of Fuqing not only passed down the making method of Guangbing, but also passed down the culture to make ritual offerings, Guangbing, to their ancestors.

Oyster Patties (海蛎饼): Oyster patties are a fried snack made of rice flour (pulp), soya bean powder (pulp), oyster, pork, cabbage and seaweed.

Fish Ball (鱼丸): Fuqing fish balls are balls of fish mince made from eels, mackerel or freshwater fish, and sweet potato flour mixed evenly to make its wrappers. Inside, they contain the mince of pork or shrimp.

Sweet Potato Ball (番薯丸): Sweet potato balls have a wrapper made of starch and sweet potato flour. The mince is made of oyster, seaweed and pork. Sweet potato balls represent family reunion.

Seaweed Cake (紫菜饼): Seaweed cakes are made of flour and seaweed, traditionally using a stone oven.

== Festival and special customs ==
Fuqing has some special customs different from other areas in China, which reflects the local history and culture. Fuqing customs have four obvious influences:

(1) the legacy of ancient Yue; (2) ancient Central Plains culture; (3) religion, especially Buddhism and Taoism; (4) in modern times, foreign culture

=== Spring Festival ===
Unlike other areas of China, the top part of the couplets traditionally put up during the Chinese New Year are white, not red. It is said that in 1562 on New Year's Eve, when the Japanese invaded Fuqing, people had to escape shortly after putting up the Spring Festival couplets. Upon returning after General Qi Jiguang's victory, people changed the couplets from red, which represents joy and celebration, into green or added white on the top to mourn for their family and friends who had died in the conflict.

On the first day of the new year, people in Fuqing like many across the Eastern Fujian region commonly eat xianmian (Chinese: 线面; pinyin: xiànmiàn), an extra-thin wheat noodle, with the addition of two duck eggs to represent longevity. In the local language, the term for "duck egg" (Chinese: 鸭卵, BUC: ák-lâung) has a pronunciation similar or the same as that of "suppress chaos" (Chinese: 压乱, BUC: ák-lâung); thus the eggs represent peace and stability. The dish is often given the name 'peace noodles' (Chinese: 太平面; pinyin: tàipíng miàn). A similar combination is also commonly eaten on birthdays, where it is dubbed 'longevity noodles' (Chinese: 长寿面; pinyin: chángshòu miàn).

The second day of the new year is the day to visit and comfort the family that have lost their family members in the previous year (Chinese: 拜初二; pinyin: bài chū'èr, alternatively in Chinese: 拜新座; pinyin: bài xīnzuò). On that day, people thus avoid visiting families where nobody died in the previous year, regarding such a visit as unlucky.

=== Lantern Festival ===
The main customs of the Lantern Festival include eating yuanxiao, dragon and lion dance, Shehuo, lantern riddles, stilt, boat, row, and walking on the Li Bridge.

=== Winter Solstice Festival ===
The most important part of the winter solstice festival is making glutinous rice balls and preparing the red-orange and ten pairs of chopsticks. The red-orange stands for blessing and the ten pairs of chopsticks stand for family reunion. People also light a pair of red candles to represent prosperity.

=== Tomb-sweeping Day ===
The essential part of the Qingming Festival is to offer sacrifices that are often made from paper, as well as fire incense and firecrackers in front of the tomb. After sweeping the tomb, people take some pine branches or flowers back home for good luck.

== Transportation ==
Fuqing has two railway stations. Fuqing railway station was opened on April 26, 2010, on the Fuzhou–Xiamen railway, and is situated south of the urban area. A second railway station, Fuqing West railway station on the Fuzhou–Xiamen high-speed railway, was opened to the public on September 28, 2023.

The principal means of public transportation within the city is the bus system, with most of the towns of the peninsula also being served.

== Notable people from Fuqing ==
- Sudono Salim/Liem Sioe Liong (1916–2012), Indonesian businessman, billionaire. Founder of Salim Group
- Sutanto Djuhar/ Liem Oen Kian (1928–2018), Indonesian and Chinese businessman. President of RongQiao Group
- Cao Dewang (1946-), billionaire businessman, chairman of Fuyao Group, winner of Ernst & Young World Entrepreneur of the Year 2009
- Chen Zhangliang (1961-), Former President of China Agricultural University, vice-governor of Guangxi Province
- Tjoa Ing Hwie (1925-1985), Indonesian businessman, billionaire. Founder of Gudang Garam tbk.
- Oei Wie Gwan, Indonesian Businessman, Founder of Djarum Clove Cigarette
- Ye Xianggao (1559–1627), Senior Grand Secretary of the Ming dynasty.
- Hou Jianguo (born 1959), president of the Chinese Academy of Sciences
- Wu Gan (born 1972), human rights activist
- Zheng Xingjuan (born 1989), high jumper
- Xu Yunli (born 1987), Chinese volleyball player, Olympic gold medalist at Rio 2016
- Lin Li (born 1992), Chinese volleyball player, Olympic gold medalist at Rio 2016
