= Long Island Military Reservation =

Long Island Military Reservation may refer to:

- Long Island Military Reservation (Massachusetts), later named Fort Strong
- Long Island Military Reservation (Maine), a former military reservation in Maine
