= Long County =

Long County may refer to:

- Long County, Shaanxi (陇县), China
- Long County, Georgia, United States
