= Shehuo =

Celebration tradition in China

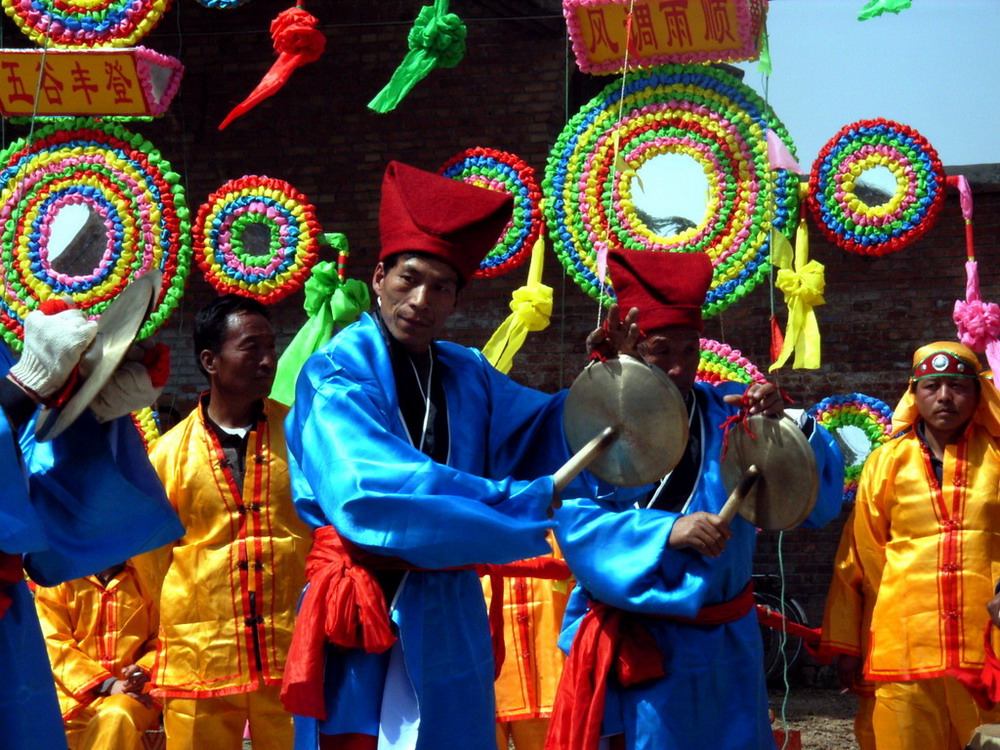
- Shehuo in Changzhi, Shanxi, 2006
- Chinese: 社火
- Literal meaning: community fire
Transcriptions
Standard Mandarin
- Hanyu Pinyin: shè huǒ

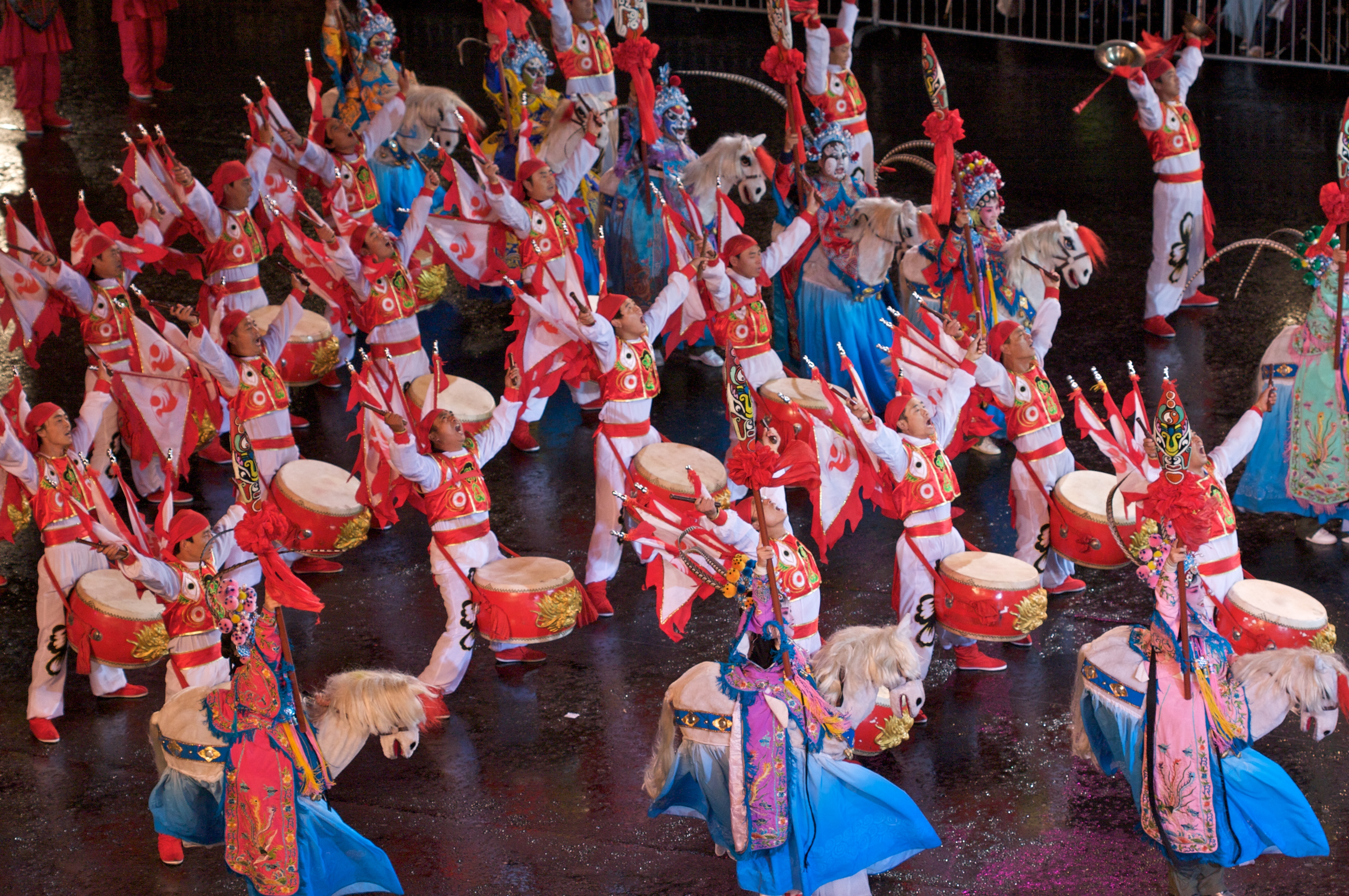
A Shehuo cultural troupe performs at 2009 Edinburgh Military Tattoo

Shehuo (Chinese: 社火; pinyin: Shèhuǒ; lit. 'community fire'), also known as earth and fire, is a Chinese traditional carnival-like folk celebration prevailing mainly in the countryside of Northern China during the Chinese New Year, featuring dragon dance, lion dance, Yangko dance, traditional Chinese opera, stilt walkers, fire breathing, drumming and other folk arts. The roles in Shehuo encompass hundreds of character figures, including traditional deities and immortals, buddhas, sages, heroes, and various mythical creatures from ancient mythology, historical tales, and folklore.

With a long history, these festive affairs are rooted in primitive sacrificial activities in which ancient people prayed for harvest and affluence with their songs and dances from "She" (the God of Earth) and "Huo" (literally meaning fire). Over time, it gradually evolved into a folk custom staged during the Spring Festival and Lantern Festival, believed to ward off bad luck and usher in a fresh start for the new year. Shehuo has been inscribed on the official intangible cultural heritage lists of Shaanxi, Qinghai, Gansu, and related regions; in 2006, it was inscribed into China's National Intangible Cultural Heritage list.

== History ==
Shehuo traces its history back to ancient sacrificial ceremonies held to pray for good harvests about 2,000 years ago. Known as Saishe (Chinese: 塞社; lit. 'offering sacrifices in gratitude to deities') in early Chinese texts, it originated from an ancient community ritual known as Chunqi Qiubao (Chinese: 春祈秋報; lit. 'spring prayer and autumn thanksgiving'), which itself developed from the earlier "Three Big Sacrifices", meaning the rain-seeking ritual of yu (雩), the year-end thanksgiving ritual of zha/la (蜡/臘) and particularly the exorcism ritual of nuo (儺). The first Shehuo event dates back to the Qin and Han dynasties. Combining "Hundred Dramas" with other acrobatics in the ancient sacrifices to the Earth God and the Valley God, it was also known as "Shooting Tiger" (射虎) and gradually evolved into an entertainment activity to welcome the Spring Festival. Shehuo traditions further developed in the Tang and Song dynasties and flourished in the Ming and Qing dynasties. Starting from the late Qing and Republican eras, Shehuo increasingly incorporated elements of regional opera, folk dance, and Buddhist ritual gestures, resulting in a rich cultural syncretism. In 2026, a traditional Shehuo performance in Haidong, Qinghai, was recognized by Guinness World Records as the "largest Shehuo performance".

== Practices ==
2026 Henan Shehuo filmed by CNS

There are two major types of Shehuo, Pose Shehuo and Performance Shehuo. Pose Shehuo includes forms such as Cloth Shehuo, Carrying Shehuo, Horse Shehuo, Car Shehuo, Xinzi (Note: The xinzi is a special form of performance in which children and adults dressed as various characters are held at a certain height by a special iron frame.) Shehuo, Mountain Shehuo, and Masked Shehuo, which are performed in processions and primarily showcase character displays and craftsmanship. Performance Shehuo includes forms such as Floor Shehuo and Stilt-walking Shehuo, which are mainly performed in open spaces and involve martial arts-style combat. Most of the performances are inspired by myths, legends, and historical stories. Ancient Chinese literary classics, such as Romance of the Three Kingdoms, The Investiture of the Gods, and Journey to the West, are often adapted.

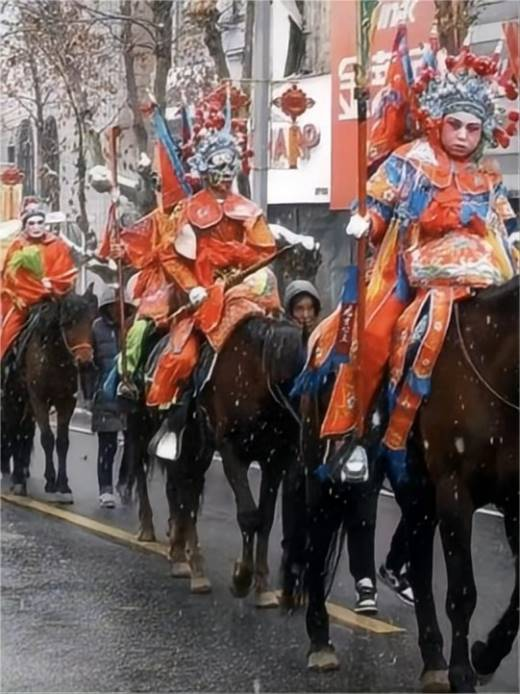
Horse Shehuo

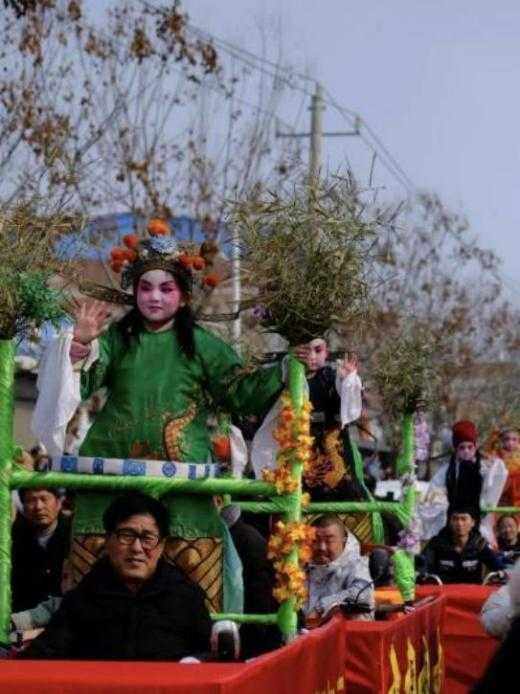
Car Shehuo

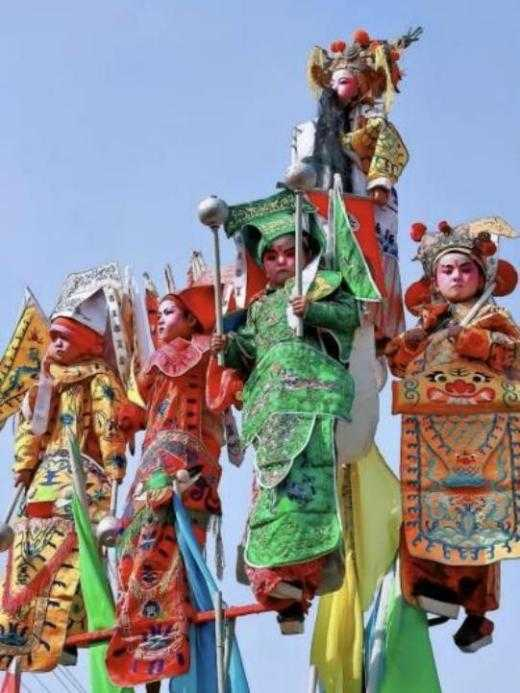
Carrying Shehuo

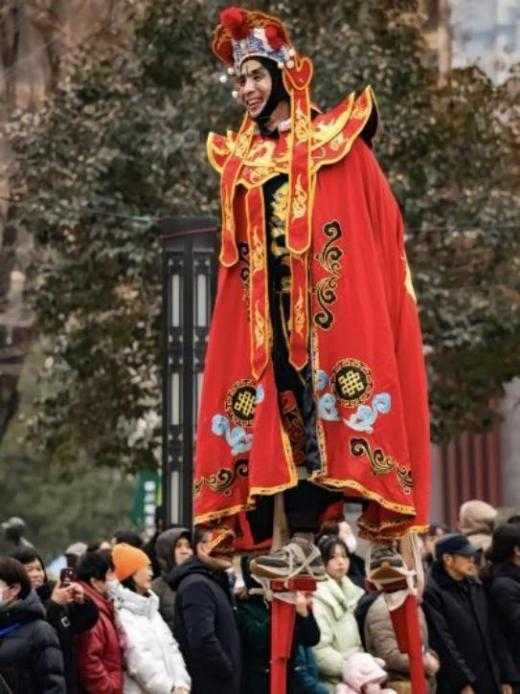
Stilt-walking Shehuo

=== Masks ===
Shehuo masks are props worn by performers during Shehuo practice to disguise themselves as gods or righteous figures that are said to have magic powers in folktales or legends. A painted wooden ladle mask, known as Mashao facial makeup, is often used on Shehuo, and people hang them on doors to protect their houses and ward off evil during the festival.

== Regional variations ==
=== Shanxi ===
According to local officials, Shanxi is famous for its Shehuo performance because the flourishing of merchants during the Ming and Qing dynasties brought prosperity to the province, giving more importance to festive celebrations. "Wen Shehuo" and "Wu Shehuo" are two main types. The "Wen Shehuo" includes rice-planting songs, opera, and small-flower operas, while the "Wu Shehuo" includes stilts, martial arts, and gongs and drums. Known as the "Home to Chinese Folk Arts", Zuoquan's Shehuo performances have three major forms: Opera, martial arts and clown. Opera Shehuo is "classy", Kung Fu Shehuo is "fierce" and the Clown Shehuo is "hilarious". The Jiacun temple festival of Shangdang is widely acclaimed as the "number one folk Shehuo in North China".

Shehuo performance of Shangdang
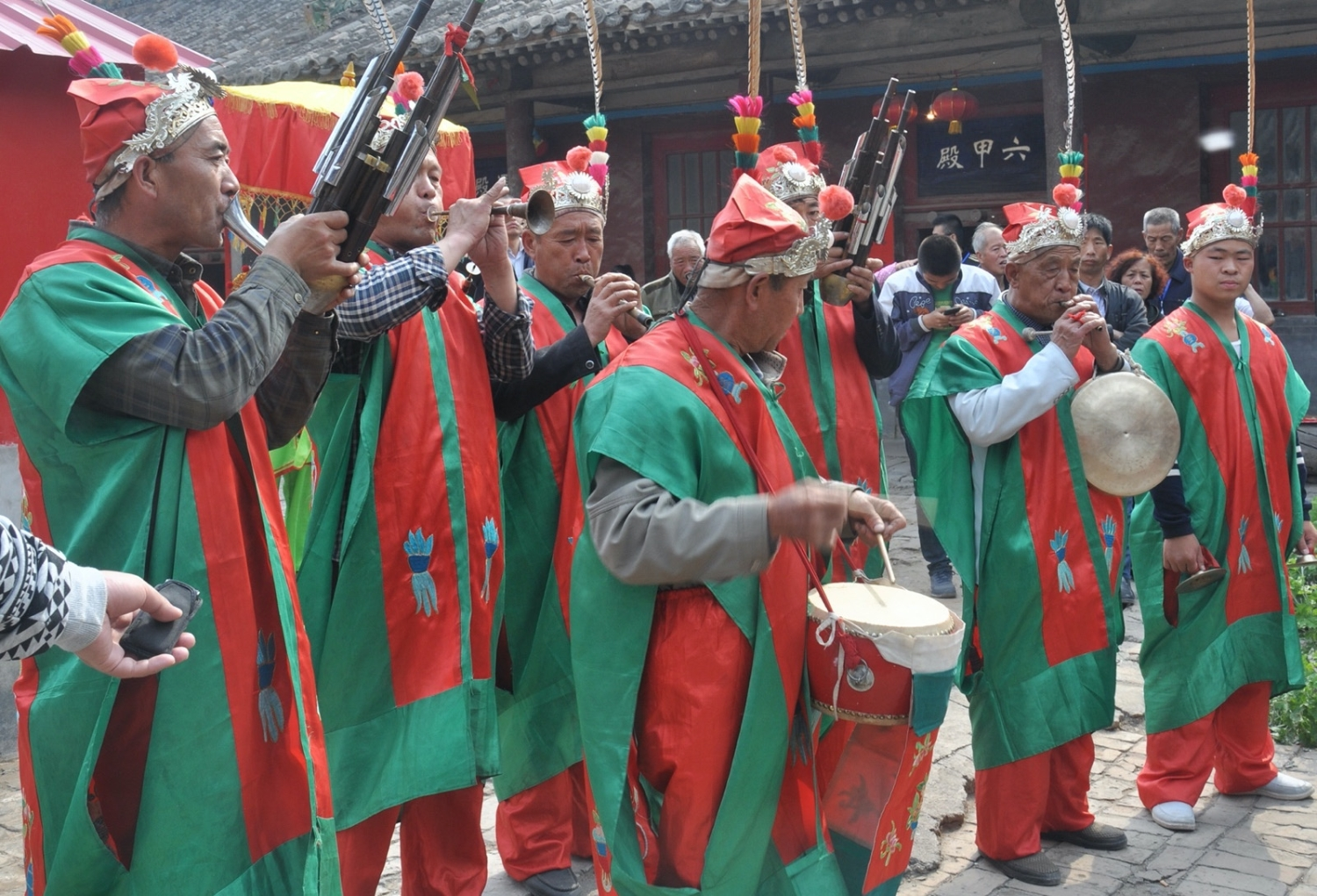
The musical performance of "Fetching the Deities"

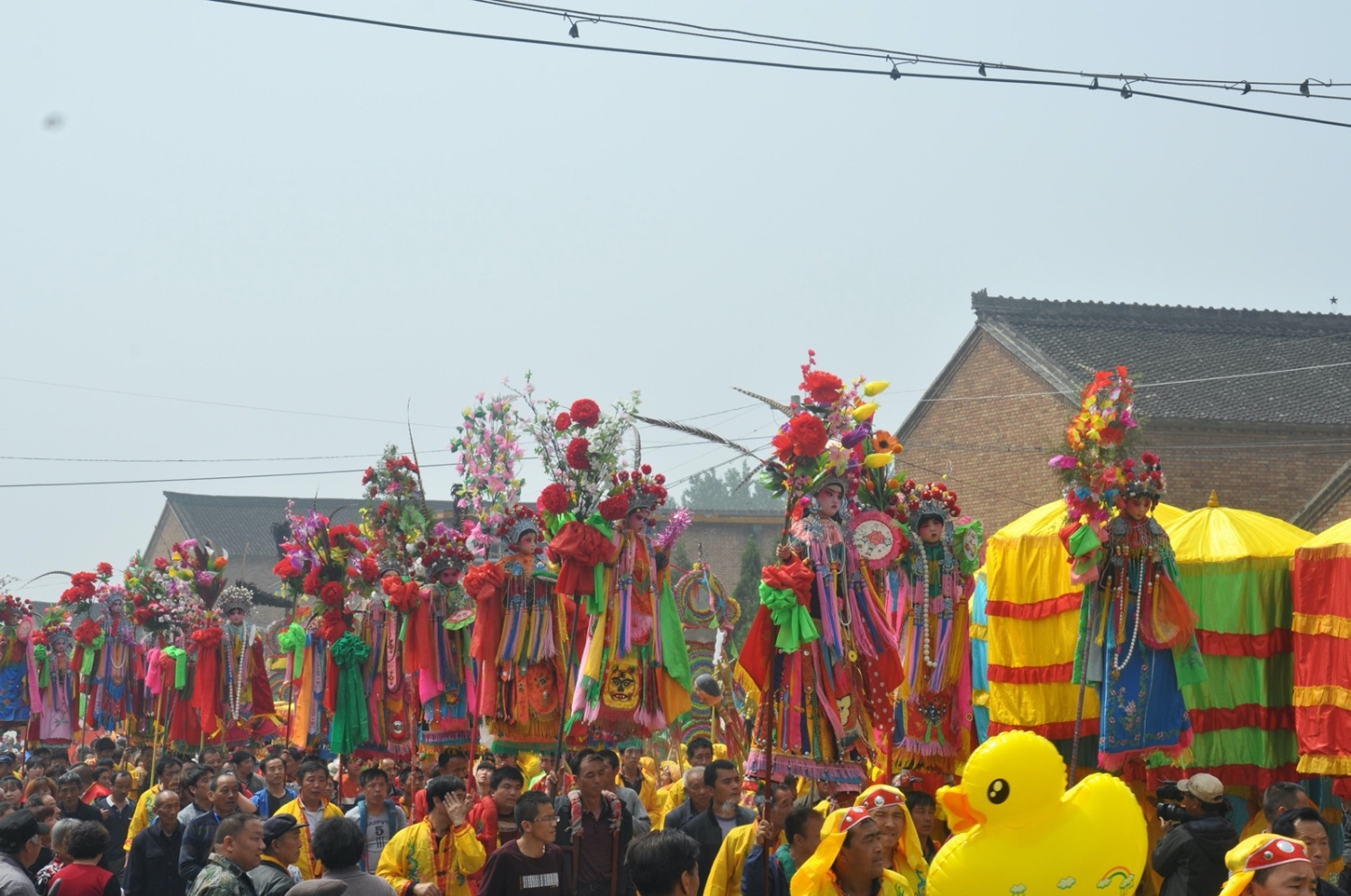
Shehuo-parade

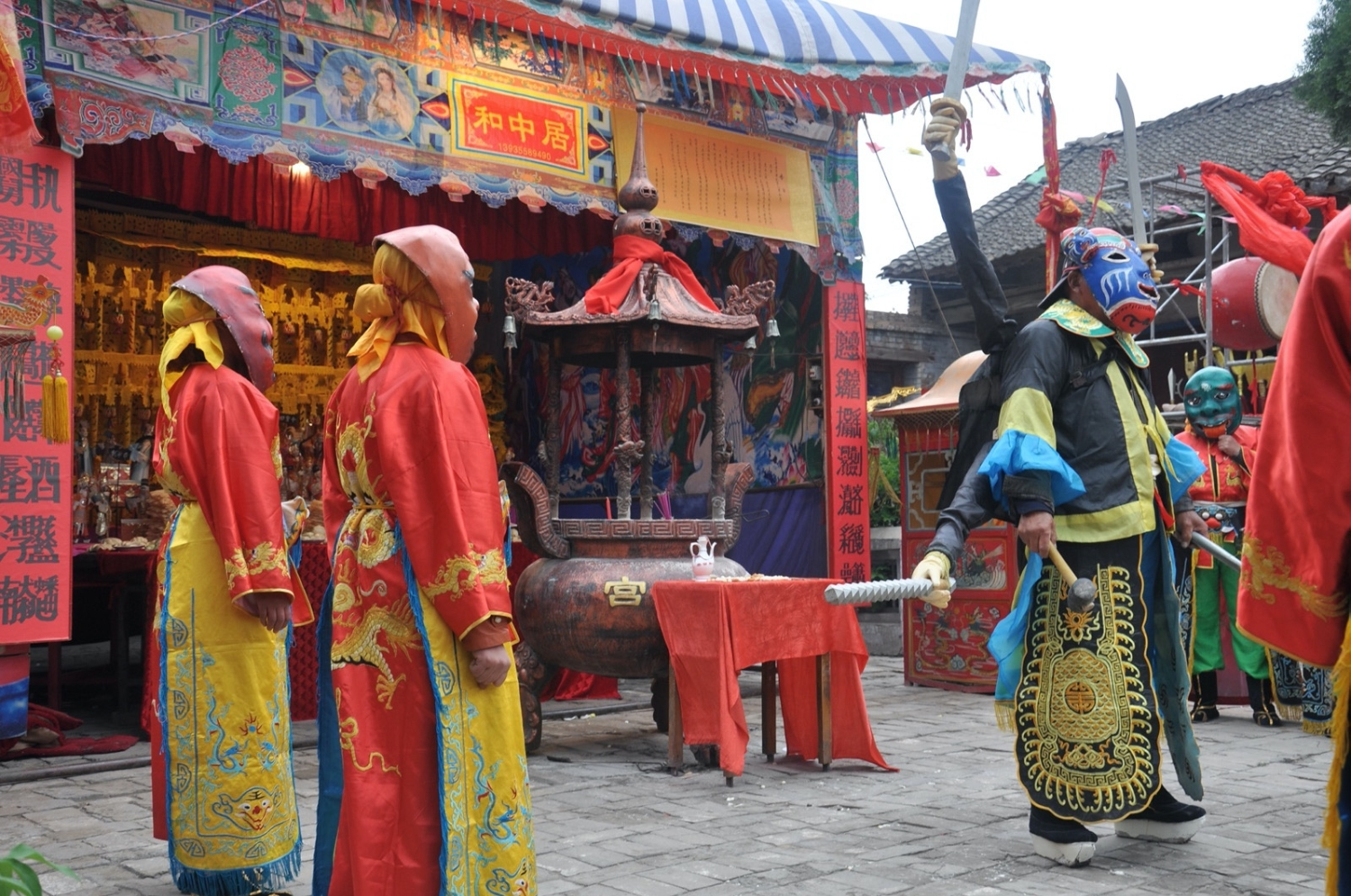
Masked group dance performance

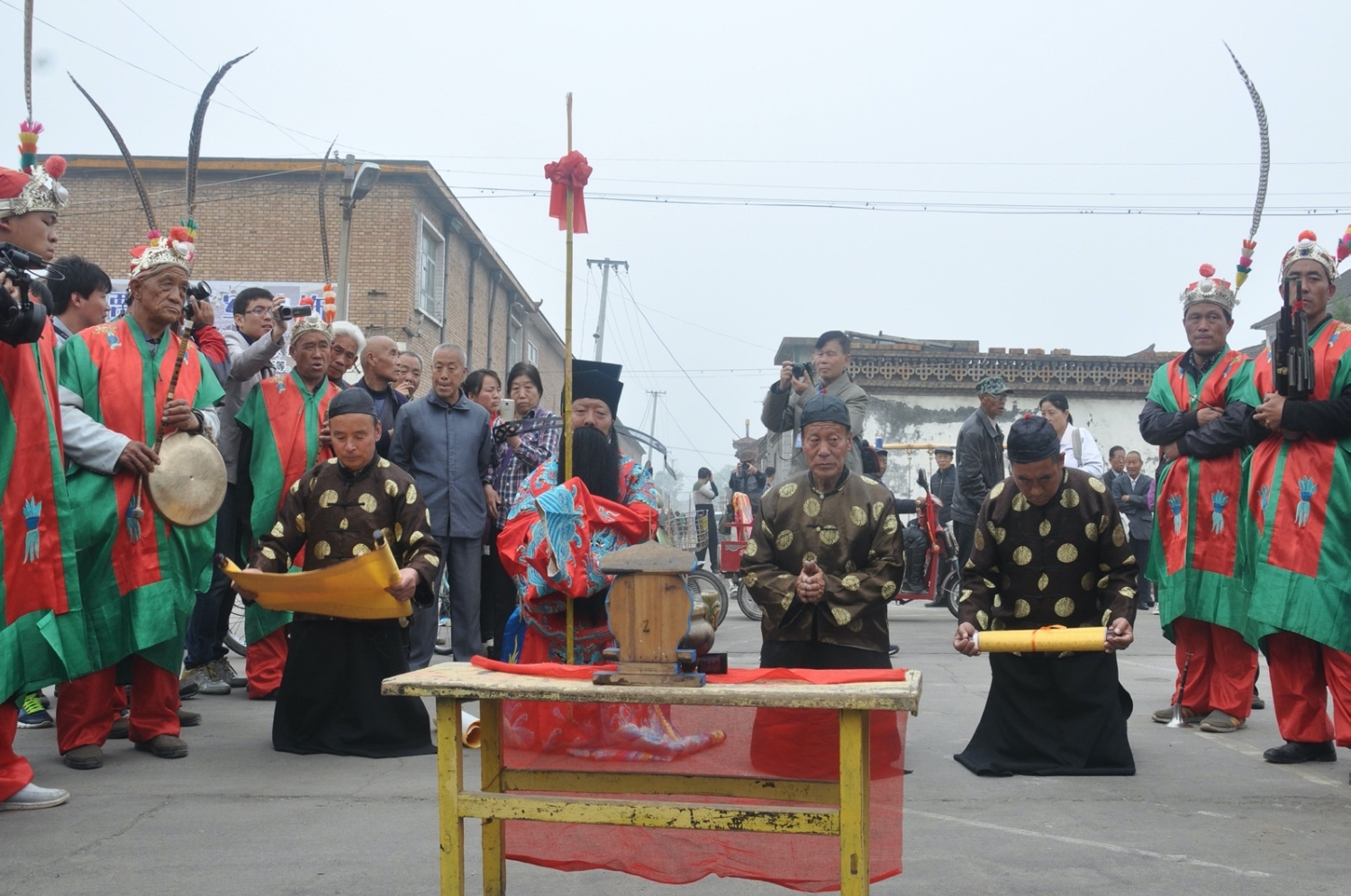
Offering sacrifices to wind

=== Shaanxi ===
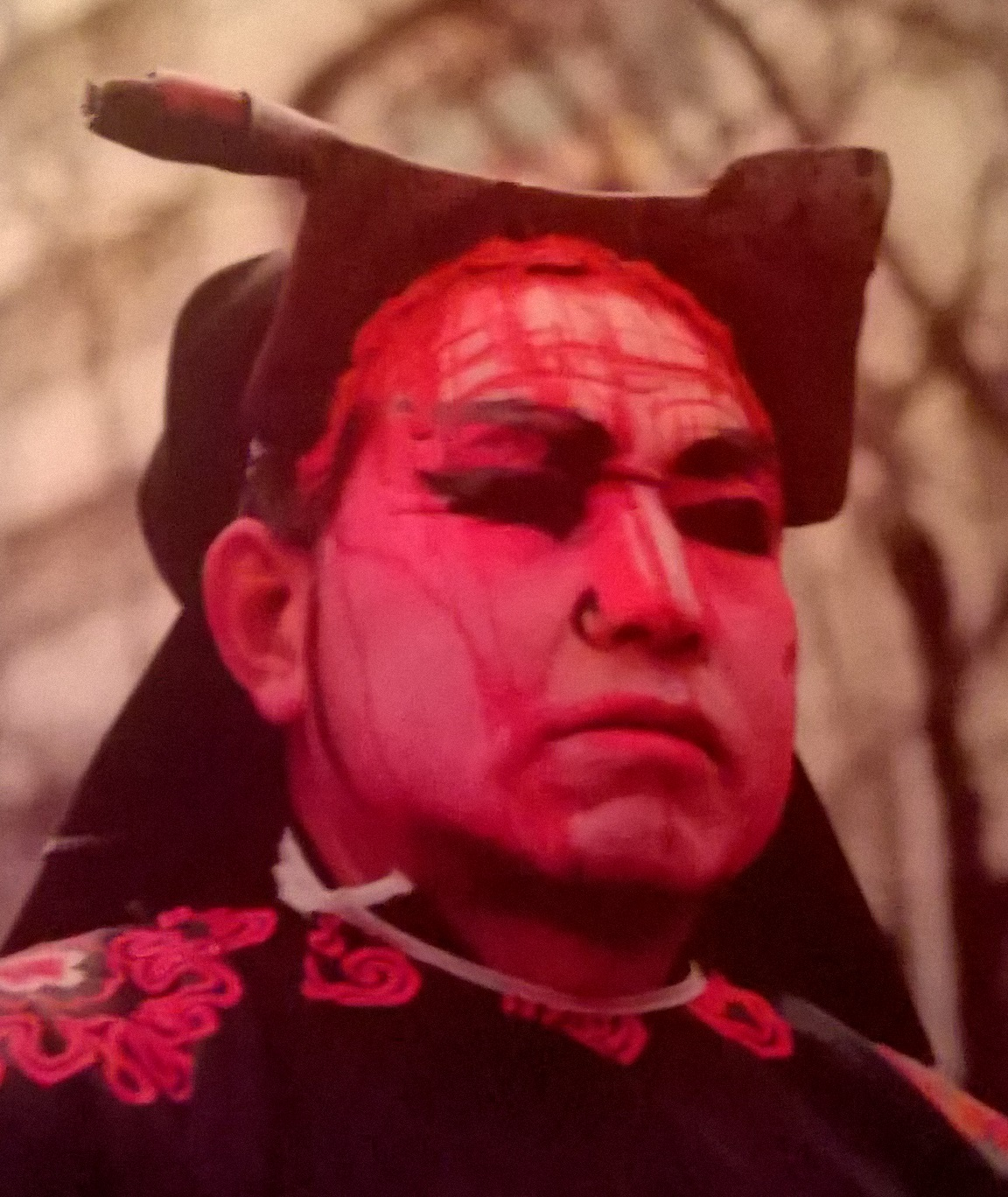
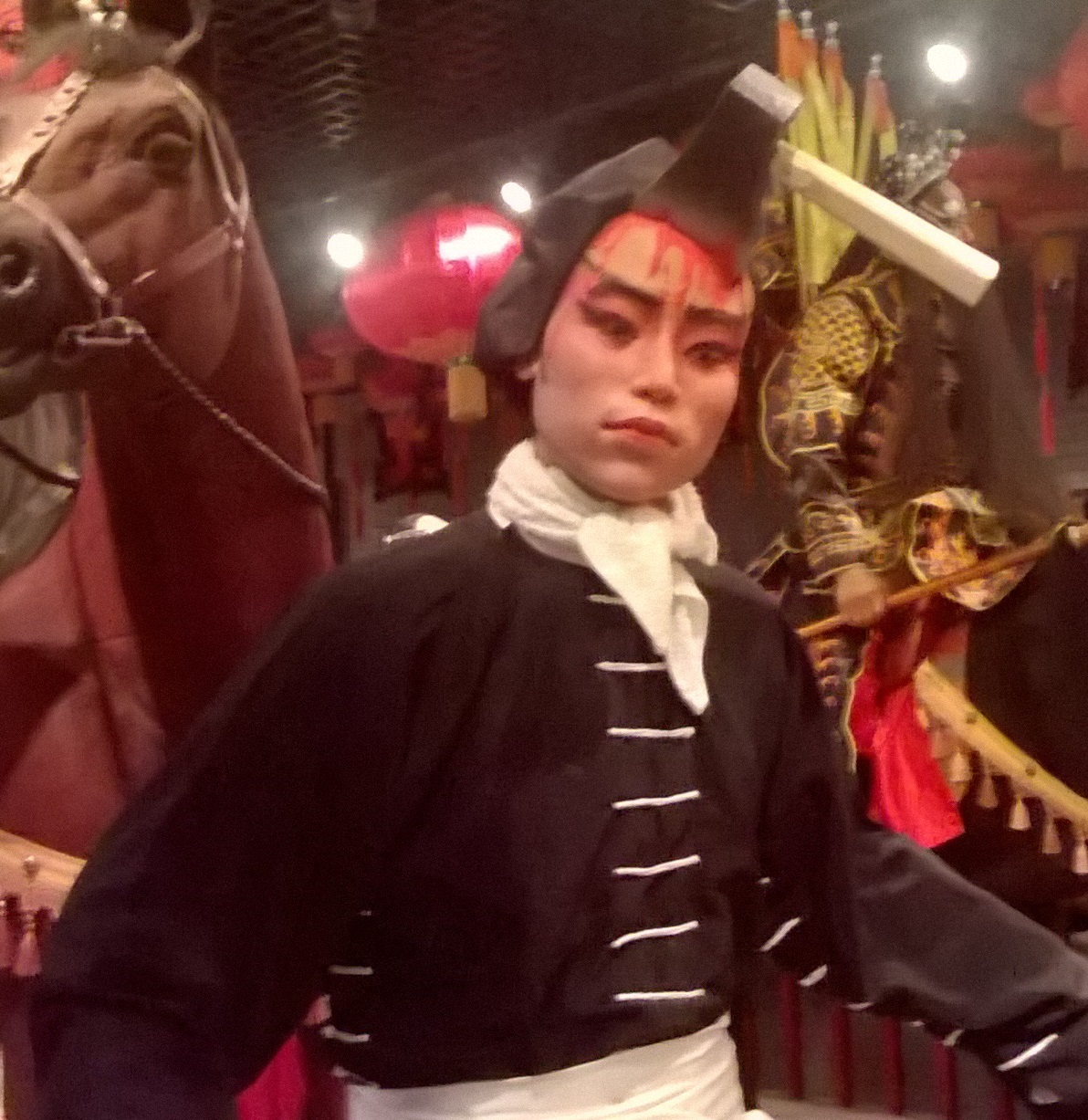
Wax Figures of Blood Shehuo on Display at Baoji Folk Museum

The unique feature of Shaanxi Shehuo is that each performance is led by Zhao Gongming to clear the way, accompanied by a grand gong and drum team that plays with intense and powerful rhythms. With a wide variety of Shehuo genres prevailing in the region, the most famous kind is the Water Margin-influenced Blood Shehuo in Chisha Village of Baoji. Focusing on the theme of punishing evil and promoting goodness, performers use facepaint and props to make it look like they have been violently attacked with axes, scissors, arrows and other objects. The stunt skill of Blood Shehuo, which is "only passed on to sons but not daughters", remains unknown to outsiders.

=== Ethnic Minorities ===
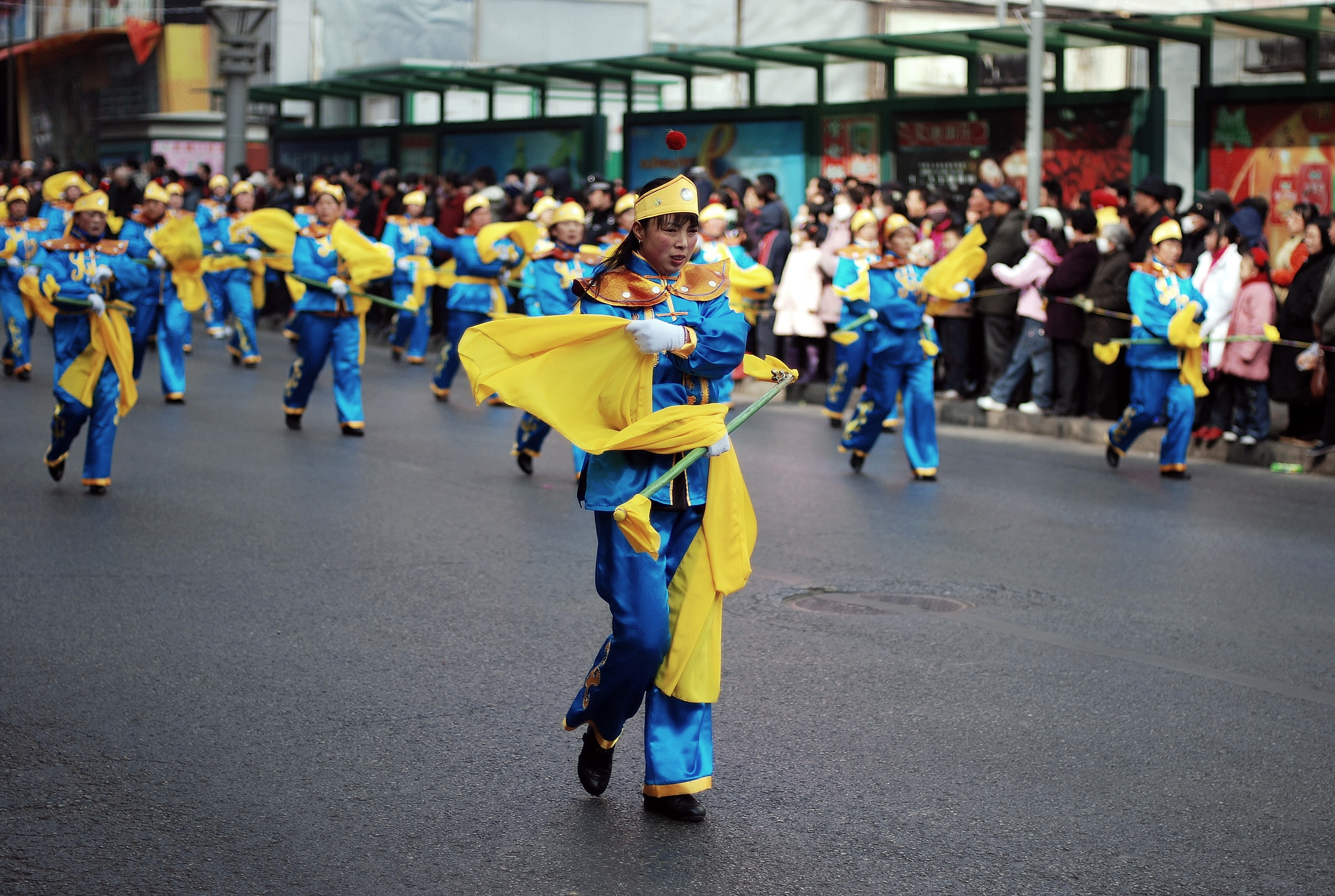
Shehuo in Xining on the 12th day of the first lunar month, 2008

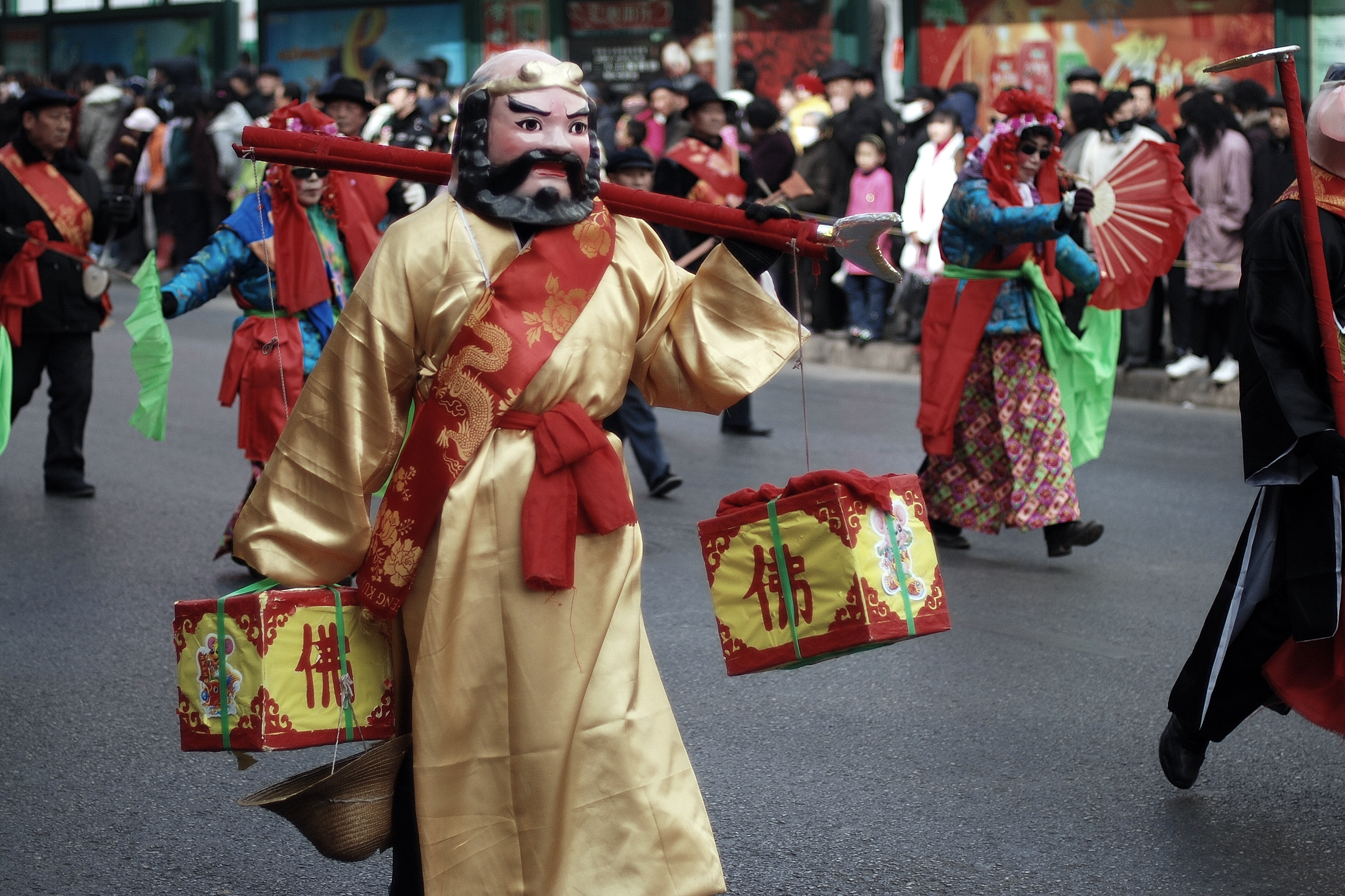
A performer dressed as Sha Wujing from Journey to the West

The Qinghai Shehuo incorporates the traditional dances and banquet songs of the Hui ethnic group. Gansu's Shehuo absorbed diverse cultural elements from the Silk Road, along with multi-ethnic integration, and diverged into regional styles such as Hexi, Longdong, and Gannan. In Xinjiang, local Shehuo blends traditional folk customs with regional ethnic minority arts, such as black horse running, song, and dance. Benxi shehuo, popular in Benxi Manchu Autonomous County, of Liaoning, is believed to have originated either from Fengxiang, Shaanxi, the cradle of Western Zhou culture, or from the ancient shamanistic beliefs and rituals of the Manchu ethnic group.
