= Length (disambiguation) =

Length in its basic meaning is the long dimension of an object.

Length may also refer to:

== Mathematics ==
- Arc length, the distance between two points along a section of a curve.
- Length of a sequence or tuple, the number of terms. (The length of an n-tuple is n)
- Length of a module, in abstract algebra
- Length of a polynomial, the sum of the magnitudes of the coefficients of a polynomial
- Length of a vector, the size of a vector

== Other uses ==
- Length (phonetics), in phonetics
  - Vowel length, the perceived duration of a vowel sound
  - Geminate consonant, the articulation of a consonant for a longer period of time than that of a single instance
- Line and length, the direction and point of bouncing on the pitch of a delivery in cricket
- Horse length, the length of a horse in equestrianism
- Length overall, the maximum length of a vessel's hull measured parallel to the waterline
