= Long Mountain =

Long Mountain may refer to:

== Geography ==
=== China ===
- Mount Long (陇山), the southern section of Mount Liupan within Shaanxi province, which defines the western end of the Guanzhong region

=== Jamaica ===
- Long Mountain (Jamaica), a mountain in the Kingston area

=== United Kingdom ===
- Long Mountain (Powys), on the borders of Powys, Wales and Shropshire, England

=== United States ===
- Long Mountain (Hampshire County, Massachusetts)
- Long Mountain, just west of Tuxedo, North Carolina
- Long Mountain in Hardy County, West Virginia

== Other ==
- Long Mountain (radar), Taiwanese air defense and BMD radar

== See also ==
- De Long Mountains, Alaska, United States
- Langeberg, a mountain range in South Africa
- Long Mynd, Shropshire, England
- Long Range Mountains, Newfoundland, Canada
