= Long Island Ducks (disambiguation) =

Long Island Ducks may refer to:

- The Long Island Ducks of the Atlantic League of Professional Baseball
- The former Long Island Ducks (basketball) of the Eastern Basketball Association
- The former Long Island Ducks (ice hockey) of the Eastern Hockey League

== See also ==
- Long Island Duck, a colloquial name for the American Pekin, a breed of domestic duck
