= Long Island Railroad (disambiguation) =

Articles on Long Island Railroad include:

- Long Island Rail Road
- History of the Long Island Rail Road
- List of Long Island Rail Road stations
