= Justice Long =

Justice Long may refer to:

- Charles D. Long (1841–1902), associate justice of the Michigan Supreme Court
- Virginia Long (born 1942), associate justice of the Supreme Court of New Jersey
