= Long River Review =

American literary magazine

- Categories: Literary magazine
- Frequency: Annual
- Publisher: University of Connecticut
- First issue: 1997
- Country: United States
- Website: longriverreview.com
- OCLC: 49745855

Long River Review is the University of Connecticut's annual literary magazine run by undergraduate students with the assistance of faculty staff. It is currently coordinated by Professor Ellen Litman. Each year a selection and interview process is held to find the most qualified students to join the LRR staff. The Long River Review class is only offered once a year, for the production of the magazine in the springtime.

The class itself is divided into groups of panelists and specific position roles. Panelists comb through the multitude of submissions received every year to pick pieces in fiction, poetry, creative non-fiction, or translations to publish. Students with position roles help run the magazine, overseeing various areas including editing, fundraising, copy editing, and social media. The class works together to produce a magazine for sale. The process of creating this magazine helps students understand more about the literary publishing industry and get practical experience working in a publishing setting.

Along with written submissions, the Long River Review also accepts art submissions for publication in the magazine, accepting photographs, drawings, illustrations, comics, mixed media designs, and more.

Long River Review replaced Writing UConn : fiction, essays, poetry (OCLC 19407118) run by the Department of English from 1983–1997.

== Prizes ==
The following prizes are awarded each year by the magazine:

- Edward R. & Frances Schreiber Collins Poetry Award
- Jennie Hackman Memorial Award for Short Fiction
- Wallace Stevens Poetry Prize

== Editors ==
The following people have been the Editor-in-Chief of the magazine:

- 2027 – Elijah Polance & Liam Smith
- 2026 – Ryan Krishna & Sofia Tas-Castro
- 2025 – Sky Cummings
- 2024 – Ally LeMaster
- 2023 – Rylee Thomas
- 2022 – Nicole Catarino
- 2021 – Alexander Mika
- 2020 – Anna Zarra Aldrich
- 2019 – Siobhan Dale & Brianna McNish
- 2018 – Rebecca Hill
- 2017 – Stephanie Koo
- 2016 – Shannon Hearn
- 2015 – Lauren Silverio
- 2014 – Krisela Karaja
- 2013 – Alyssa Palazzo
- 2012 – Ryan Wiltzius
- 2011 – Joe Welch
- 2010 – Annie Brooks
- 2009 – Michael Pontacoloni
- 2008 – Nathan Harold
- 2007 – Jaclyn Allard
- 2006 – Christopher Venter
- 2005 – Jacob Overdurff
- 2004 – Ashley Linden
- 2003 – Sarah Breckenridge
- 2002 – Julie Wernau
- 2001 – Nathan Fisher & Jessica Francassini
- 2000 – Stephani M. Dion
- 1999 – Marla Gelman & Tracey Lander
- 1998 – Michael Gore & Michael Schiavo
