= Diode Poetry Journal =

English-language poetry journal and small press

- Editor-in-chief: Patty Paine
- Categories: Poetry
- Format: Online
- First issue: 2007
- Country: Qatar and the United States
- Based in: Doha and Richmond, Virginia
- Language: English

Diode Poetry Journal (stylized in all lowercase) is an English-language online poetry magazine founded in 2007 by poet and editor Patty Paine. The journal was established while Paine was teaching at Virginia Commonwealth University School of the Arts in Qatar, and early coverage described it as partially supported by Virginia Commonwealth University at Qatar. Its affiliated small press, Diode Editions, was founded in 2012 as an offshoot of the journal and publishes poetry collections, chapbooks, and poetry-related nonfiction.

== History and VCUarts Qatar connection ==
Virginia Commonwealth University School of the Arts in Qatar, known as VCUarts Qatar, is the Doha campus of Virginia Commonwealth University School of the Arts. It was founded in 1998 through a collaboration between the Qatar Foundation and VCU's School of the Arts, and serves as a branch of the Richmond campus through exchanges, courses, conferences, programming, and arts research.

Paine founded Diode Poetry Journal in 2007. In 2008, Diode was described as a triannual journal of American experimental poetry that was "partially supported by Virginia Commonwealth University at Qatar". The VCU-based literary journal Blackbird later identified Paine as the founding editor of both Diode Poetry Journal and Diode Editions, and as an assistant professor of English at VCUarts Qatar. Diode Editions' staff page describes the press as based in Doha and Richmond, and lists editor and art director Law Alsobrook as an associate professor of graphic design at VCUarts Qatar.

== Journal ==
Diode Poetry Journal publishes poetry online. In 2007, poet Rigoberto González listed the journal in a Poetry Foundation essay on online journals as one of the online outlets in which he had placed poems. Early issues included poetry and reviews; later issues included poetry, chapbooks, interviews, and reviews. In 2017, NewPages reported that the journal's tenth-anniversary issue included work by more than 40 poets, two full-length collections, chapbooks, interviews, and reviews. NewPages also reviewed volume 12, number 2 of the journal in 2019 and noted poems in the issue that drew from music, medical documentation, and other poets.

In March 2026, Duotrope marked its listing for the journal as inactive, stating that the journal's website was undergoing a redesign and was no longer functioning. A March 9, 2026 post on Diode Editions' official Instagram account similarly said the Diode website was down, would need to be rebuilt from its archive, and that a planned redesign for the journal's 20th anniversary would begin earlier than expected.

== Diode Editions ==
Diode Editions was founded in 2012 as an offshoot of Diode Poetry Journal. The press publishes poetry, chapbooks, and poetry-related nonfiction and runs annual book and chapbook contests. Poets & Writers lists Diode Editions as an independent press publishing poetry collections and chapbooks, with subgenres including cross-genre, experimental, formal poetry, graphic or illustrated work, prose poetry, and translation. In a 2022 contest listing, Poets & Writers described Diode Editions as an extension of Diode Poetry Journal and said its book contest awarded publication, a cash prize, and author copies.

The press's representative authors listed by Poets & Writers include Traci Brimhall, Dorothy Chan, Paul Guest, Nathalie Handal, Lena Khalaf Tuffaha, Jason Koo, Randall Mann, Philip Metres, sam sax, Tyler Mills, Seema Yasmin, and Rewa Zeinati, among others.

== Selected books and reception ==
Several books and chapbooks published by Diode Editions have received literary award recognition. Philip Metres's A Concordance of Leaves won the 2014 Arab American Book Award for poetry. Remica Bingham-Risher's Starlight & Error, published by Diode in 2017, won the Diode Editions Book Award and was a finalist for the Library of Virginia Book Award. Shanta Lee's GHETTOCLAUSTROPHOBIA: Dreamin of Mama While Trying to Speak Woman in Woke Tongues, published by Diode Editions in 2021, won the 2021 Vermont Book Award and the 2020 Diode Press full-length book prize.

Dorothy Chan's Revenge of the Asian Woman was listed by the Poetry Foundation among the 2020 Lambda Literary Award finalists in Bisexual Poetry. Koss's Dancing Backwards Towards Pluperfect was a 2025 Lambda Literary Award finalist in Lesbian Poetry. Jason Koo's No Rest, published by Diode Editions in 2024, won the Eugene Paul Nassar Poetry Prize and the Diode Editions Book Contest and was a finalist for the Association of Writers & Writing Programs' Donald Hall Prize for Poetry.

Other Diode Editions titles have received review coverage in literary journals and magazines. Colorado Review reviewed Rage Hezekiah's Yearn, a Diode Editions Book Contest winner and finalist for the Lambda Literary Award, the Vermont Book Award, and the Audre Lorde Award for Lesbian Poetry. Reviews also appeared for Kendra DeColo and Tyler Mills's Low Budget Movie in ZYZZYVA, Rosanna Young Oh's The Corrected Version in Colorado Review, and Rosa Castellano's All Is the Telling in Southern Review of Books.

Poetry Foundation author pages also list other Diode Editions books and chapbooks, including Paul Guest's Because Everything is Terrible, Hazem Fahmy's Red//Jild//Prayer, and Rosanna Young Oh's The Corrected Version.

== See also ==
- List of literary magazines
- Small press
- Virginia Commonwealth University School of the Arts in Qatar
