= Akron Poetry Prize =

Poetry award

The Akron Poetry Prize is an annual contest held by The University of Akron Press. The competition is open to all poets writing in English. The winning poet receives an honorarium of $1,500 and publication of his or her book in the Akron Series in Poetry. The final selection is made by a nationally prominent poet. The final judge for 2025 was Eduardo C. Corral. Other manuscripts may also be considered for publication by the Series Editor. Past editor's choice selections have included books by John Gallaher, David Dodd Lee, and Sarah Perrier.

== Winners ==
Source.

- 1995: Susan Yuzna, Her Slender Dress, Judge: Charles Wright
- 1996: Clare Rossini, Winter Morning with Crow, Judge: Donald Justice
- 1997: Jeanne E. Clark, Ohio Blue Tips, Judge: Alice Fulton
- 1998: Beckian Fritz Goldberg, Never Be the Horse, Judge: Thomas Lux
- 1999: Dennis Hinrichsen, Detail from the Garden of Earthly Delights, Judge: Yusef Komunyakaa
- 2000: John Minczeski, Circle Routes, Judge: Mary Oliver
- 2001: George Bilgere, The Good Kiss, Judge: Billy Collins
- 2002: Roger Mitchell, Delicate Bait, Judge: Charles Simic
- 2003: Sharmila Voorakkara, Fire Wheel, Judge: Maxine Kumin
- 2004: Vern Rutsala, How We Spent Our Time, Judge: Robert Wrigley
- 2005: Ashley Capps, Mistaking the Sea for Green Fields, Judge: Gerald Stern
- 2006: Alison Pelegrin, Big Muddy River of Stars, Judge: B. H. Fairchild
- 2007: Brian Brodeur, Other Latitudes, Judge: Stephen Dunn
- 2008: Rachel Dilworth, The Wild Rose Asylum: Poems of the Magdalen Laundries of Ireland, Judge: Rita Dove
- 2009: Oliver de la Paz, Requiem for the Orchard, Judge: Martín Espada
- 2010: Joshua Harmon, Le Spleen de Poughkeepsie, Judge: G.C. Waldrep
- 2011: Emily Rosko, Prop Rockery, Judge: Natasha Sajé
- 2012: Seth Abramson, Thievery, Judge: Dara Wier
- 2013: John Repp, Fat Jersey Blues, Judge: David Kirby
- 2014: Philip Metres, Pictures at an Exhibition, Judge: Maxine Chernoff
- 2015: Sandra Simonds, Further Problems with Pleasure, Judge: Carmen Giménez Smith
- 2016: Aimée Baker, Doe, Judge: Allison Joseph
- 2017: Tyler Mills, Hawk Parable, Judge: Oliver de la Paz
- 2018: Kimberly Quiogue Andrews, A Brief History of Fruit, Judge: Diane Seuss
- 2019: Sean Shearer, Red Lemons, Judge: Victoria Chang
- 2020: Aimee Seu, Velvet Hounds, Judge: Philip Metres
- 2021: Carrie Oeding, If I Could Give You a Line, Judge: Erika Meitner
- 2022: Lena Khalaf Tuffaha, Something About Living, Judge: Adrian Matejka
- 2023: Jess Smith, Lady Smith, Judge: Sandra Beasley
- 2024: Ryan Teitman, Paperweight, Judge: Matthew Olzmann
- 2025: Alfredo Aguilar, My North County, Judge: Eduardo C. Corral
- 2026: Emma Trelles, Courage and the Clock, Judge: Brenda Shaughnessy
