= Something About Living =

2024 poetry collection by Lena Khalaf Tuffaha

- Author: Lena Khalaf Tuffaha
- Publisher: University of Akron Press
- Publication date: April 2, 2024
- Pages: 81
- Awards: Akron Poetry Prize
- ISBN: 978-1629222738
- Preceded by: Kaan and Her Sisters

Something About Living is a 2024 poetry collection by Lena Khalaf Tuffaha. Among other things, the book concerns the history of Palestine and the experiences of the Palestinian diaspora. It was published by University of Akron Press for the Akron Series in Poetry after Adrian Matejka selected Tuffaha's manuscript for the 2022 Akron Poetry Prize. It won the 2024 National Book Award for Poetry and was shortlisted for the 2025 PEN Heaney Prize.

== Content ==
The book involves "Tuffaha’s own Palestinian heritage, the often-erased humanity of the Palestinian people, and themes of love, violence, family and home."

== Background ==
In TriQuarterly, Tuffaha stated that the book's poems were written while she was finished with the manuscript for Kaan and Her Sisters and subsequently circulating it for publication. She considered Something About Living to be an "explicitly Palestinian American book" whereas Kaan and Her Sisters was "more Arab and Arabic."

Some of the book's poems initially appeared in Tahoma Literary Review, The Nation, Mizna. The book's title is a reference to June Jordan, and the book includes Tuffaha's 2022 The Nation poem, "Letter to June Jordan in September". A launch event for the book was hosted at the Palestinian Film Festival in September of 2024.

== Critical reception ==
Publishers Weekly called the book "brilliant" and said "This superb volume sings of those determined to fight for a fairer future."

Electric Literature listed the book in a recommendation list titled "7 Poetry Collections that Transform the Personal Into Portals". George Abraham, who featured some of the book's poems in the Mizna magazine, called them "incredible".

It was selected by the American Library Association as a Notable Book in 2025.
