= Atopia (disambiguation) =

Atopia is a Canadian production company and film distributor.

Atopia may also refer to:

- Atopia, a 2001 book by Helmut Willke
- Atopia, a 2019 book of poetry by Sandra Simonds

== See also ==
- The Atopia Chronicles, a 2012 novel by Matthew Mather
- Atopy (philosophy), the ineffability of things or emotions that are rarely experienced
