= Institute for Middle East Understanding =

Non-profit organisation in the US

- Formation: Tax-exempt since November 2005; 20 years ago
- Type: 501(c)(3)
- Tax ID no.: 202389388
- Headquarters: Tustin, California
- Revenue: 3,074,585 USD (2023)
- Expenses: 2,475,493 USD (2023)
- Website: imeu.org

The Institute for Middle East Understanding (IMEU) is an American pro-Palestinian advocacy group.

The organization states that it "works to increase and enhance the public’s understanding about Palestine, Palestinians, and Palestinian Americans through media."

Founded in 2005, it received a grant from the Washington-based Jerusalem Fund for Education and Community Development in 2006 for Education and Community Development, which was used to undertake the first compilation of profiles of Palestinian-Americans in the fields of the arts, literature, academia, business and community service, which were then disseminated to news media and on the Internet. As an example, the IMEU sent a letter to news outlets in November 2007 that provided the names and profiles of Palestinian-Americans who could be contacted to discuss the upcoming Annapolis Conference. The names included Samar Assad, Executive Director of The Jerusalem Fund, Diana Buttu, a Ramallah-based attorney and former advisor to Palestinian negotiators, Omar Dajani, a San Francisco-based law professor and former legal advisor to United Nations Special Envoy Terje Rød-Larsen, and Nadia Hijab, a Senior Fellow at the Washington-based Institute for Palestine Studies.

One of the organization's co-founders is Lena Khalaf Tuffaha, who is also a member of the American-Arab Anti-Discrimination Committee (ADC) Seattle chapter. As Secretary and Treasurer of the IMEU, she and the organization were featured in the Non-Profit Spotlight of the e-magazine The Mideast Connect. Its board of directors consists of chairman Khaldoun Baghdadi, treasurer Zahira Dahdul, secretary Nadia Tommalieh, Jeanmarie Condon and Isam Salah.

Since 2006, the IMEU has also published Letters from Palestine, a collection of first-hand testimonies from Palestinians about their daily lives.
