= Patty Paine =

American poet

Patty Paine (born May 17, 1965) is an American poet, author, and scholar. She is the author of five poetry collections and the co-editor of two anthologies of Arabian literature. In 2007, Paine established Diode Poetry Journal and founded the small press Diode Editions in 2012. Paine is a Professor of English and Director of Liberal Arts and Sciences at Virginia Commonwealth University - Qatar.

Raised in Vernon Township, New Jersey, she attended Vernon Township High School.

== Published works ==
=== Authored works ===
==== Books ====
- Grief & Other Animals. Accents Publishing. 2015 ISBN 978-1-936628-37-7
- The Sounding Machine. Accents Publishing. 2012. ISBN 978-1-936628-11-7

==== Chapbooks ====
- City of Small Fires. Hysterical Books. 2018.
- Feral. Imaginary Friend Press. 2012.
- Elegy & Collapse. Finishing Line Press. 2006.

==== Select poems ====
- "The Taxidermist Takes on an Apprentice," Verse Daily, 7 July 2018.
- "Call and Response," The Adroit Journal, Issue 13.
- "what we made by looking," Waxwing, Issue 12, 2017.
- "a place that bears no scar," Thrush, July 2017.
- "Memento Mori" and "Vanishing [the window’s lament]," Muse/A Journal, 2016.
- "What Light Does," Blackbird v14n2, 2015.
- "Dogs," Umbrella Journal, 2007.
- "Notes On Mirrors, Already Lost ||| OCHO #16," The Literary Review.
- "Purple, A Morphology" and "i don't want," pioneertown.
- "this is the nature of that country," AMP Magazine Issue 2.

==== Select prose ====
===== Nonfiction =====
- "Review | The View from Zero Bridge, by Lynn Aarti Chandhok." Blackbird v8n1. 2016

==== Interviews ====
- Abani, C. "A Conversation with Chris Abani." Blackbird v8n1. 2009.

=== Edited works ===
==== Anthologies ====
- Paine, Patty, and Samia Touati, eds. Gathering the Tide: An Anthology of Contemporary Arabian Gulf Poetry. Garnet Publishing & Ithaca Press. 2012. ISBN 978-0863723759
- Paine, Patty, Jesse Ulmer, and Michael Hersrud, eds. The Donkey Lady and Other Tales from the Arabian Gulf. Berkshire Academic Press. 2013. ISBN 978-1907784125

==== Select translations ====
- Al Kuwari, Soad. "The Flood." Trans. Fatima Mostafawi with Patty Paine. Blackbird v9n2, 2010.
- Al Kuwari, Soad. "Modernity in the Desert." Trans. Sara Al Qatami with Patty Paine. Blackbird v9n2, 2010.
- Al Sindi, Fawzia. "from Less Than Ink." Trans. Bahaa-eddin M. Mazid with Patty Paine. Blackbird v9n2, 2010.
- Mufarreh, Saadia. "Soon She Will Leave." Trans. Hend Mubarek Aleidan with Patty Paine. Blackbird v9n2, 2010.
- Tarkovsky, Arseny. "Here, a house once stood." Trans. Philip Metres and Dimitri Psurtsev. Ed. Patty Paine. Diode Poetry Journal v7n3, 2014.

== Awards and honors ==
- 2015 INDIEFAB Book of the Year Award Finalist for Grief & Other Animals (Accents Publishing, 2015)
- 2014 THE WARDROBE’S BEST DRESSED: PATTY PAINE’S “FERAL”
- 2013 Distinguished Achievement for Service Award, VCUarts Qatar
- 2011 Winner of the Accents Publishing International Poetry Book Contest for The Sounding Machine (Accents Publishing, 2012)
- 2010 Distinguished Achievement in Research Awards, VCUarts Qatar
- 2007 AWP Intro Journal Award
- 2007 Catherine and Joane Byrne Poetry Prize

== Select reviews ==
- "Chapbook Reviews II: Patty Paine, Cecily Parks, Barbara Tran, Catherine Pierce, and John Allman." Anna Journey. Blackbird v5n2. 2006.
- "Review | The Sounding Machine, by Patty Paine." Catherine MacDonald. Blackbird v11n2. 2012.
- "Review | Feral, by Patty Paine." Emilia Phillips. Blackbird v11n1. 2012.
- "Review | Grief & Other Animals, by Patty Paine." Laura Van Prooyen. Blackbird v12n2. 2016.

== Interviews ==
- Doallas, Maureen and Patty Paine. "Interview with Poet Patty Paine (Part 1): Write Fearlessly." tweetspeak: the best in poetry & poetic things. 2014.
- Duotrope and Patty Paine. "Editor Interview: diode poetry journal." Duotrope. 12 January 2012.
- McCurry, Christopher and Patty Paine. "Patty Paine on Grief & Other Animals." Accents Publishing Blog. 28 September 2015.
- McCurry, Christopher and Patty Paine. "Plunging into the Depths to Measure." Public Republic. 6 May 2013.
- Montesano, Keith and Patty Paine. "#63 - Patty Paine." First Book Interviews: Continuing the Tradition of Kate Greenstreet. 25 January 2013.
- Schubert, Karen and Patty Paine. "Meet the Press: Karen Schubert in Conversation with Patty Paine, Editor of Diode Editions." Best American Poetry Blog. 13 December 2014.

== Panels ==
- Mattawa, Khaled, Patty Paine, and Jeff Lodge. "A Conversation with Khaled Mattawa." Blackbird v6n2. 2007.
