= Simone Person =

Simone Person is a multi-genre author, poet and scholar based in Indiana from Adrian, Michigan. In 2018, Person became the Prose Editor for Honeysuckle Press and was named a Pink Door Writing Retreat Fellow in 2019. Her writing has appeared or is forthcoming in The Conium Review, The Rumpus, Thrush, Atticus Review, and elsewhere. Person's first chapbook collection Dislocate won the 2017 Honeysuckle Press Chapbook Contest. Bhanu Kapil, who judged the 2017 contest, praised the collection for "its figural imaginary," and described it as "a work of abject longing, set in temperatures that don't easily regulate or normalize." Person's second chapbook collection Smoke Girl won the 2018 Diode Editions Chapbook Contest, judged by Founding Editor Patty Paine. About Person's latest collection, Rachel Wiley said, Smoke Girl "will look you in the eye and exhale thick truth that will either warm you or choke you."

== Awards ==
- 2018 Diode Editions Chapbook Prize
- 2017 Honeysuckle Press Chapbook Award
