= Century of genocide =

Century of genocide may refer to:

- The 20th century, during which several genocides occurred
- Century of Genocide: Critical Essays and Eyewitness Accounts, a book of essays edited by Samuel Totten, William S. Parsons, and Israel Charny
- A Century of Genocide: Utopias of Race and Nation, book by Eric D. Weitz
- Centuries of Genocide: Essays and Eyewitness Accounts, a book of essays edited by Samuel Totten and William S. Parsons

== See also ==
- Age of Extremes, another label for the 20th century from the 1994 book by Eric Hobsbawm
