= Janaka Stucky =

Poet

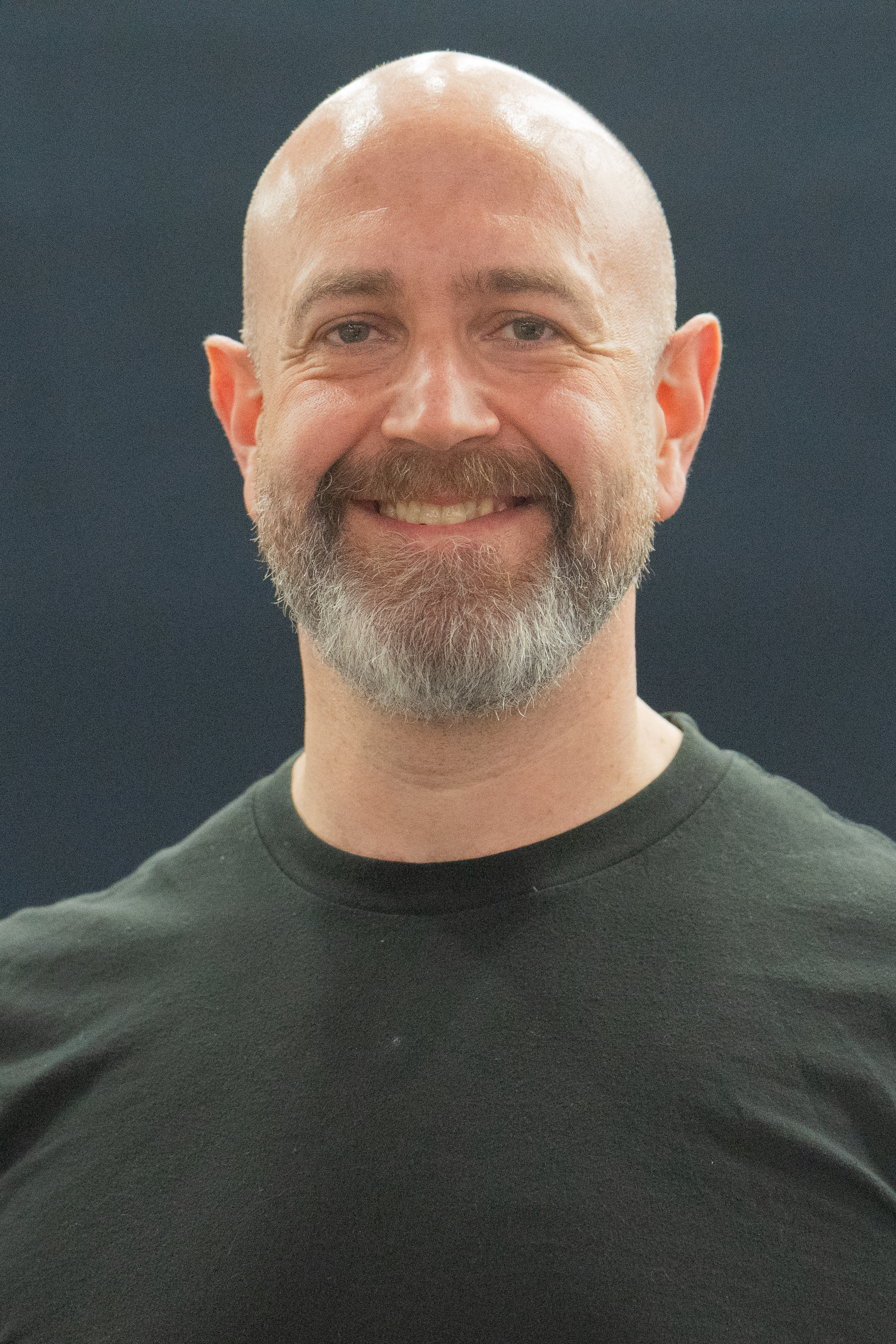
- Stucky at AWP 2026
- Born: 23 March 1978; Boston, Massachusetts, U.S.
- Occupation: Poet
- Website: janakastucky.com

Janaka Stucky (born March 23, 1978) is an American poet, performer, independent-press publisher, and impresario, based in Boston, Massachusetts. The founder of Black Ocean, an independent press, and publisher of its journal Handsome, he is also the author of three collections of his poetry: Your Name Is The Only Freedom (Brave Men Press, 2009), The World Will Deny It For You (Ahsahta Press, 2012), and The Truth Is We Are Perfect (Third Man Books, 2015). His articles have been published by The Huffington Post and The Poetry Foundation. In 2010, he was awarded the title Best Poet by The Boston Phoenix in its annual "Boston's Best" reader's poll.

== Personal life ==
Janaka Stucky was born in Boston, Massachusetts, and spent much of his childhood in an ashram. He was originally named Jonathan, but "when he was eight months old, his parents' guru suggested they christen him Janaka", after the ancient king of Mithila, a spiritual leader whose philosophy is chronicled in the Ashtavakra Gita and whose attainment of perfection is mentioned in the Bhagavad Gita (III,20,25). Stucky received a BFA degree from Emerson College, where he co-founded the street poetry collective The Guerilla Poets. He received his MFA degree in Poetry from Vermont College in 2003.

From 2002 to 2009, he worked as an undertaker, which, he says, "influenced and informed my work a great deal. ... I came to understand the poem as a ritual, a funeral for the constant death of language."

He is also interested in boxing.

== Writing and career ==
=== The Guerilla Poets ===
During his senior year at Emerson College, Stucky co-founded The Guerilla Poets, a group which gave spontaneous public poetry performances in non-traditional locations, such as streetcorners, malls, fast-food restaurants, and subways. The group appeared at the People's Poetry Gathering in New York City, where Stucky won a head-to-head haiku competition against established Vermont poet Marc Awodey, impressing Awodey so much that he published a selection of the group's poems, Speak These Words: A Guerilla Poets Anthology (2001), edited by Stucky. The group subsequently toured in a van across the United States three times, at one point performing as many as thirty shows in twenty days and selling more than nine hundred copies of their book, a large number for a book of poems by unestablished poets. The Guerilla Poets disbanded in 2002.

=== Black Cat Burlesque, Feast of Flesh, Black Ocean ===
In 2003, he co-founded the Boston-based horror-themed neo-burlesque troupe "Black Cat Burlesque", performing and emceeing under the name J. Cannibal and becoming known as the "King of Horror Burlesque". As J. Cannibal, Stucky initiated what grew into a popular semi-annual horror-movie and entertainment night called J. Cannibal's Feast of Flesh. In 2010, for its tenth occurrence, he expanded it into a nine-day horror-film festival, Terrorthon. As of October, 2014, however, he terminated the Feast of Flesh evenings to concentrate more on organizing poetry readings and other literary events.

In 2004, Stucky founded Black Ocean, an independent press publishing mostly poetry, with staff in Boston, Chicago, and Detroit, which he continues to run. He is also the publisher of Handsome, the press's annual literary magazine. Black Ocean has published books by Zachary Schomburg, Aase Berg, Brandon Shimoda, and Joshua Harmon, among others. For some time Black Ocean produced Black Cat Burlesque events and J. Cannibal's Feast of Flesh, although as of 2014 it no longer does.

Stucky's poems have appeared in Cannibal, Denver Quarterly, Fence, Free Verse, No Tell Motel, North American Review, redivider, The Equalizer, and VOLT. He wrote the introduction to Marc Awodey's 2008 collection of poems and artwork, Senryu & Nudes. In November 2009, Brave Men Press published a chapbook of his poems entitled Your Name Is The Only Freedom.

In April 2010, readers of the Boston Phoenix named Stucky "Best Poet" in the paper's annual Boston's Best poll. He was a write-in candidate, competing against Sam Cornish, Robert Pinsky, Louise Gluck, Rosanna Warren, Margo Lockwood, and Frank Bidart. In November 2010, he contributed a literary postcard to the silent auction for Grub Street, Inc.'s "From The Desk Of" series.

=== "How to Survive in the Age of Amazon" ===
In January 2012 on the web site of the Poetry Foundation, home of Poetry magazine, Stucky published an essay, "How to Survive in the Age of Amazon," directed at independent bookstores whose existence is threatened by massive online retailers. The essay was reprinted by The Huffington Post and widely discussed by literary blogs and bloggers such as Bound: A Blog About Books & Libraries, Diana Dilworth, and Austin Allen, who declared the essay's recommendations "The Stucky Plan." Allen summarizes his sense of Stucky's essay:

Bravo to Janaka Stucky, whose new article in Poetry on struggling independent bookstores is both the most sensible and inspiring thing I've read on the subject. Stucky concedes what everyone in the industry knows, that a price war with Amazon is one small bookstores cannot win. Reasoning that these stores must therefore fight on different turf, he offers some concrete suggestions: establish a lively Web presence, feature expertly curated staff selections, and above all, host more events—that is, become a hub not just for reading material but for readings.

Following his own advice, Stucky himself has been hosting the monthly BASH poetry reading series since 2011 at the Brookline Booksmith, an independent bookstore in Brookline, Massachusetts. Poets reading in the series have included Joshua Harmon, Eileen Myles, and Stephanie Burt.

=== The World Will Deny It For You ===
In February 2012, Stucky's second chapbook, The World Will Deny It For You, was released. It was selected by Catherine Wagner to win the first Ahsahta Press chapbook contest. Randolph Pfaff reviewed the book for apt, the literary journal of Aforementioned Productions:

There are reminders here of the imagery of Paul Celan and Mina Loy, certainly, but Stucky's consistency of thought creates a throughline of loss and reconciliation—and more than anything else, the vast space in between the two—that is all his own. The emotion here is raw as a fresh cut and Stucky's thoughtfulness and lucid diction give The World Will Deny It For You a resonance that is often absent from contemporary poetry. This book will force you to acknowledge the fluidity of stasis, the permanence of the in-between, and the realization that when our lives seem most ambiguous, we are perhaps, most clearly our true selves.

In July 2014, Jack White's record label Third Man Records launched a spin off book-publishing arm called Third Man Books, whose first commercially available book, Language Lessons, Volume I, co-edited by Chet Weise and Ben Swank, contains poems by Stucky, along with works by many other contemporary writers. In conjunction with the release of this book, Stucky and several other poets gave readings that year under the rubric "Language Lessons" at the Newport Folk Festival.

== Bibliography ==
- Speak These Words: a Guerilla Poets anthology (ed.), Writers Pub Cooperative (2001) ISBN 978-1930149083
- Your Name Is The Only Freedom, Brave Men Press, 2009
- The World Will Deny It For You, Ahsahta Press, 2012. ISBN 9781934103333
- The Truth Is We Are Perfect, Third Man Books, 2015 ISBN 978-0-9913361-1-1
