= Sam Sax (poet) =

American poet and novelist

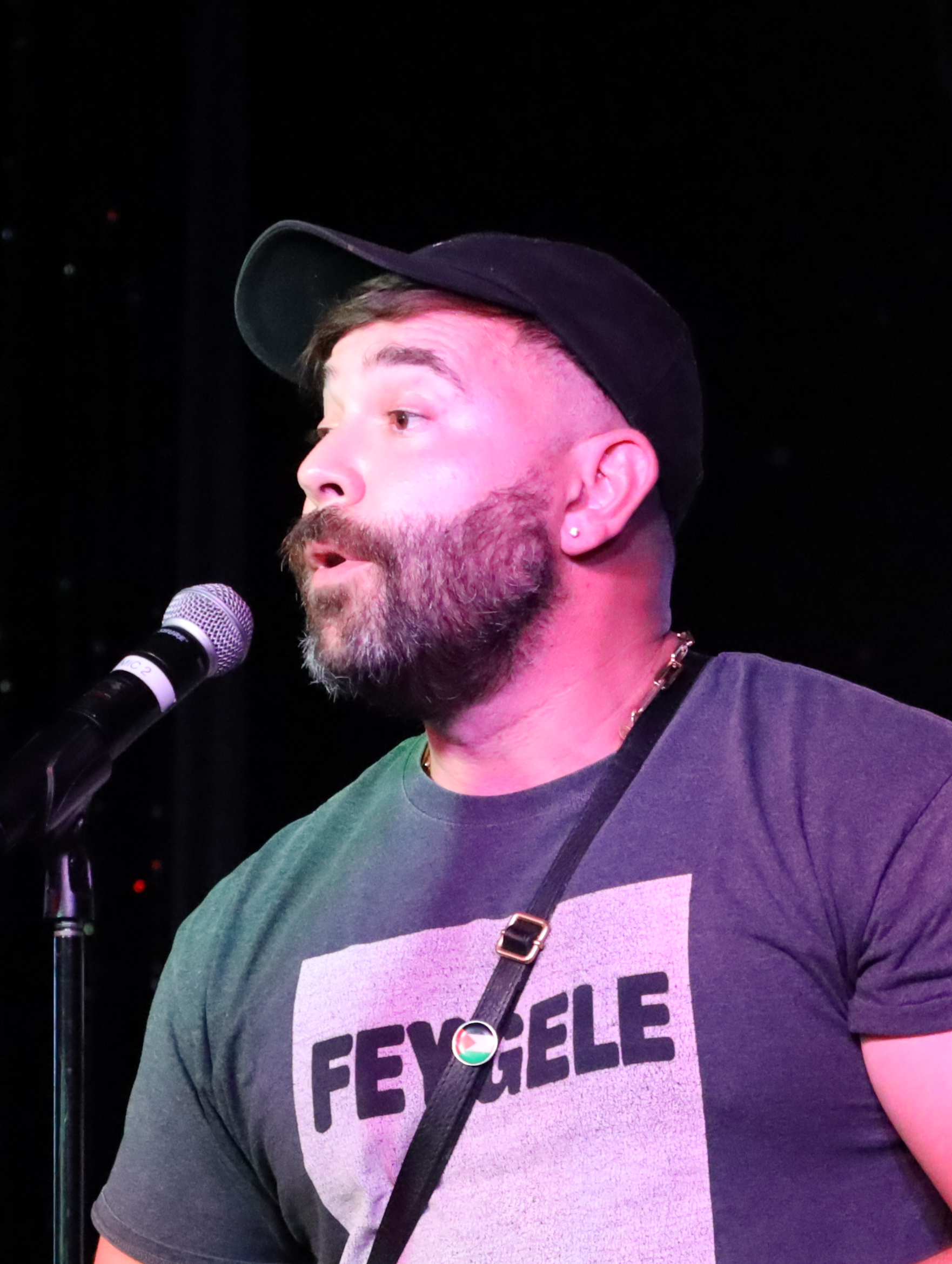
- Sax at the 2025 AWP Conference
- Education: Oberlin College (BA); University of Texas at Austin (MFA)
- Occupations: Poet; novelist; educator
- Writing career
- Notable works: bury it; Yr Dead
- Notable awards: National Poetry Series; James Laughlin Award

Sam Sax (stylized in all lowercase) is a queer Jewish American poet and novelist. They are the author of three poetry collections, Madness, bury it, and Pig, and the novel Yr Dead. bury it received the James Laughlin Award, and Yr Dead was longlisted for the 2024 National Book Award for Fiction.

== Education and career ==
Sax earned a BA from Oberlin College and an MFA in poetry from the University of Texas at Austin. In 2015, they received a creative writing fellowship in poetry from the National Endowment for the Arts. In 2018, Sax was named a recipient of the Ruth Lilly and Dorothy Sargent Rosenberg Poetry Fellowship. Sax is a former Stegner Fellow and has been a lecturer in the ITALIC program at Stanford University.

== Poetry ==
Before publishing a full-length collection, Sax published several chapbooks, including A Guide to Undressing Your Monsters, Sad Boy / Detective, Straight, and All the Rage.

Sax's first full-length collection, Madness, was published by Penguin Books in 2017 after it was selected by Terrance Hayes for the National Poetry Series. Publishers Weekly described the collection as addressing mental health, family, the Holocaust, and the AIDS crisis, while noting that some poems could lose focus. In the San Francisco Chronicle, Diana Whitney wrote that the collection uses the Diagnostic and Statistical Manual of Mental Disorders to examine medical and social classifications of sexuality and sanity.

Sax's second collection, bury it, was published by Wesleyan University Press in 2018. The collection received the 2017 James Laughlin Award from the Academy of American Poets. Maya Phillips, reviewing the collection for the Academy of American Poets, discussed its treatment of queerness, violence, grief, and recurring bridge imagery. Publishers Weekly noted the book's attention to sound and wordplay.

Sax's third collection, Pig, was published by Scribner in 2023. Publishers Weekly described the book as using the pig as both subject and object while addressing queerness, beauty, capitalism, and the body. Vulture included Pig in its list of the best books of 2023. Pig was a finalist for the 2024 Lambda Literary Award for LGBTQ+ Poetry.

== Fiction ==
Sax's debut novel, Yr Dead, was published by McSweeney's in 2024. The novel was longlisted for the 2024 National Book Award for Fiction.

Kirkus Reviews described Yr Dead as a language- and image-driven novel. In The Observer, Miriam Balanescu wrote that the novel is a non-chronological account of its protagonist's life and that its formal experimentation was one of its strengths, while also finding that the book sometimes tried to cover too much. In The New Yorker, Doreen St. Félix discussed the novel in an essay on self-immolation in contemporary culture.

== Works ==
=== Poetry collections ===
- Madness. Penguin Books. 2017. ISBN 9780143131700.
- bury it. Wesleyan University Press. 2018. ISBN 9780819577313.
- Pig. Scribner. 2023. ISBN 9781668019993.

=== Poetry chapbooks ===
- A Guide to Undressing Your Monsters. Button Poetry. 2014.
- Sad Boy / Detective. Black Lawrence Press. 2015.
- Straight. Diode Editions. 2016. ISBN 9781939728074.
- All the Rage. Sibling Rivalry Press. 2016. ISBN 9781943977178.

=== Fiction ===
- Yr Dead. McSweeney's. 2024. ISBN 9781952119996.
