= Joshua Harmon (poet) =

American poet

- Born: 1971 (age 54–55); Massachusetts, U.S.
- Education: Marlboro College; Cornell University (MFA)
- Occupations: Poet; novelist; short story writer; essayist
- Writing career
- Notable awards: Akron Poetry Prize (2010)

Joshua Harmon (born 1971) is an American poet, novelist, short story writer, and essayist. He has authored six books, including The Soft Path (poems, 2019), The Annotated Mixtape (nonfiction, 2014), History of Cold Seasons (short stories, 2014), Le Spleen de Poughkeepsie (poems, 2011), Scape (poems, 2009), and Quinnehtukqut (novel, 2007).

== Life and work ==
Harmon was born and raised in Massachusetts. He was educated at Marlboro College and at Cornell University, where he earned an MFA in fiction.

Quinnehtukqut, excerpts of which were awarded a 2004 National Endowment for the Arts fellowship in prose, was short-listed for the 2008 VCU Cabell First Novelist Award. Of this novel, Open Letters Monthly wrote that "Quinnehtukqut is the most impressive debut I can remember," while The Village Voice wrote that "Harmon...concerns himself with formal innovation at the expense of a coherent narrative."

Le Spleen de Poughkeepsie was awarded the 2010 Akron Poetry Prize by judge G.C. Waldrep and published in the Akron Series in Poetry. The Rumpus called the book "Part love song, part ethnography, part cry for help." Reviewing Le Spleen de Poughkeepsie in Rain Taxi, poet Donna Stonecipher wrote that "in both free-verse and prose poem forms, [Harmon] uses lyric’s heightened capacity for beauty to detail Poughkeepsie’s ugliness in defiantly beautiful formulations." In West Branch, Ellen Wehle writes "Though I’m tempted to call it an elegy, Spleen is really more a love song, immersing me in the sights and sounds and sadnesses of a place I’ve never known but feel as if I do. … As he moves from page to page, Harmon just keeps turning his theme like a prism, finding ever subtler variations."

The Annotated Mixtape was considered "an essay collection on the nature of obsession" by The Rumpus. The Normal School called it "a journey into the mind of a true music junkie. [Harmon's] essays invite you into his musical obsessions through personal narrative, social criticism, and beautifully precise language, making you care about bands you’ve never heard of before." Kirkus Reviews described History of Cold Seasons as "a dozen stories that mash up poetic, dreamlike observations with the caustic, inbred hardiness of New Englanders," and the BBC called the book "a remarkably assured and poetic first collection."

Harmon's second volume in the Akron Series in Poetry, The Soft Path was called "intricate, intelligent, and complex," "an at times daunting though persistently rewarding collection of sound and landscape, of fragmented language and tenacious poetic cycles, of meaning-making and of diving into our political and environmental quagmires" by The Rumpus. Harmon described it as "a book composed on the move, in fragments … but also a book about how commuting (among many other forces) often keeps us from anything but a superficial relationship with places." Poetry Northwest, in a review of the book, noted "That some anti-capitalist sentiment would accompany close attention to sets of fraught and fraying systems should not come as any surprise, and the book’s dual epigraphs—a few lines from Ed Roberson’s Atmosphere Conditions and an excerpt from Amory B. Lovins’s prepared testimony to the U.S. Senate in 1976—do plenty to announce these poems’ incoming concerns with respect to economy and ecology. But there is a refreshing sense of possibility to The Soft Path’s treatment of this familiar set of problems, a freeness in its rendering that reminds us of the decadent fields of perception that language can open onto, even in application to our lamest of worldly conundrums."

Harmon's writing has appeared in various periodicals, including AGNI, Antioch Review, The Believer, Black Warrior Review, BOMB (magazine), New England Review, The Rumpus, TriQuarterly, and Verse. His chapbook Outtakes, B-Sides, & Demos was awarded the 2019 Paul Bowles Award and published as the first title from Five Points Editions.

Harmon has taught at Bucknell University, Clark University, Worcester Polytechnic Institute, and Vassar College, where he was also the 2013 Writer-in-Residence.

== Bibliography ==
- Quinnehtukqut (Starcherone Books, 2007)
- Scape (Black Ocean, 2009)
- Le Spleen de Poughkeepsie (University of Akron Press, 2011)
- History of Cold Seasons (Dzanc Books, 2014)
- The Annotated Mixtape (Dzanc Books, 2014)
- The Soft Path (University of Akron Press, 2019)
- Outtakes, B-Sides, & Demos Five Points: A Journal of Literature and Art, 2019)
