= Diana Buttu =

Canadian-Palestinian lawyer

- Born: Canada
- Education: University of Toronto; Queen's University; Stanford University; Northwestern University
- Occupations: Activist; Negotiator; Lawyer; Lecturer
- Years active: 2000–present

Diana Buttu is a Palestinian-Canadian lawyer and a former spokesperson for the Palestine Liberation Organization. Best known for her work as a legal adviser and a participant in peace negotiations between Israeli and Palestinian organizations, she has since been associated with Stanford University, Harvard University, and the Institute for Middle East Understanding (IMEU).

== Early life and education ==
Buttu was born in Canada to Palestinian Arab parents. According to a brief biography of Buttu at the Institute for Middle East Understanding, her parents "did not discuss their Palestinian identity." Buttu said that they tried "to insulate me," having left Israel "because of the sheer discrimination."

She received a B.A. in Middle East and Islamic Studies and an LL.M. from the University of Toronto, a J.D. from Queen's University Faculty of Law, a J.S.M. from Stanford Law School, and an M.B.A. from the Kellogg School of Management at Northwestern University.

== Negotiator and analyst ==
Buttu began her work as negotiator in 2000, shortly after the outbreak of the Second Intifada, by serving as a spokesperson for the Negotiations Support Unit of the Palestine Liberation Organization. The Economist described her in 2005 as being part of the closest thing to a Palestinian makeover. Al-Ahram Weekly ran an op-ed piece in 2005 in which she was lauded for projecting an image that was the opposite of the stereotype of Palestinians as villains.

Buttu has since gone on to work as a political analyst at the Institute for Middle East Understanding, "an independent non-profit organization that provides journalists with quick access to information about Palestine and the Palestinians, as well as expert sources, both in the United States and in the Middle East."

== Academic activities ==
Buttu has held a fellowship at the Stanford Center for Conflict Resolution and Negotiation and is currently listed as an instructor at Harvard Extension School. She taught a Harvard course entitled "Negotiations Skills: Strategies for Increased Effectiveness" as part of the September 2013 program and the 2014 March, July, and October programs.

== Views ==
In an NPR interview given early in her tenure as a PLO adviser, Buttu posited that the U.S. should not be "allowing the Ariel Sharon government to do whatever it wants to do", as it currently was, in her view. She also stated that both the U.S. and the international community should be enforcing international law against Israel's policy of establishing illegal settlements in the Occupied territories of Palestine and its violations of Palestinian human rights.

"I had mixed feelings about negotiating," Buttu has said. "There is a structural problem when Palestinians negotiate with Israelis. It's like negotiating with a gun to your head; where the people under occupation have to negotiate their own release."

In a 2008 CNN interview, Buttu said that Palestinian rockets do not have explosive warheads, and expressed the opinion that Hamas is a result of the 41-year long Israeli occupation and the failure of negotiations with Israel to deliver results, which had led to radicalization.

Buttu proposed in a 2010 article that the U.S. make its aid to Israel contingent on its withdrawal from West Bank settlements.

In 2011, after the Palestine Papers were made public, Buttu called for the resignation of Saeb Erekat, the Palestinian chief negotiator, saying that the documents revealed how "out of touch and unrepresentative" the Palestinian negotiators were. In a 2011 interview, Buttu said that she was aware that the Palestinians had been willing to give up West Bank territory to the Israelis as part of a peace agreement.

Buttu maintained in a 2012 op-ed that Palestinian-Israeli negotiations are "futile" given the power imbalance between the two parties. "Every Israeli proposal, and later the underlying premise of the negotiations," she additionally argued, "sought to accommodate Israel’s illegal behavior."

In a CNN interview in November 2012, Buttu said that conflict between the Palestinians and Israel would not end until Israel was held "to account under international law." This, she explained, meant forcing Israel to "completely withdraw from the West Bank and from the Gaza Strip," thus allowing "all Palestinians to live in freedom."

In a November 2012 op-ed for the Globe and Mail, Buttu called Gaza "an open-air prison" and charged that "Israel's latest bombing campaign...does not distinguish civilian from combatant, adult from child." She accused Israel of setting "policies on the minimum number of calories needed to prevent malnutrition" and of strictly limiting Gaza's access to the sea.

Buttu reiterated in a January 2013 interview that the Palestinian-Israeli negotiations, both before, during, and after her involvement, had failed "primarily because we had two very unequal parties." In the same interview she expressed the desire that Mahmoud Abbas would "sign on to the International Criminal Court," "hold Israel accountable for the settlement construction and expansion," and "declare this apartheid."

In a July 2014 interview with CNN, Buttu denied Hamas's alleged use of human shields, said it would be a war crime if it was, and argued it was racist to assume many Palestinians would act as human shields.

In a July 2014 debate about the 2014 Gaza War, Buttu responded to Hillel Neuer's request that Buttu should condemn Hamas because it is "anti-woman, anti-gay, anti-human rights" with "if you want me to renounce Hamas because they are anti-woman, anti-everything then I'm also going to sit and renounce Israel which is also anti-woman, anti-free speech, anti-gay, anti-everything." She also accused Hillel of deflecting from what they really should be discussing, namely the "war crimes that Israel continues to commit against the Palestinians" and that she was refusing to "go down [Hillel's] pinkwashing line of discussion".

In 2018, in an opinion piece in the Israeli newspaper Haaretz, Buttu stated that she regretted being part of the Palestinian negotiating team. "It is repugnant that the world demands that Palestinians negotiate their freedom, while Israel continues to steal Palestinian land."

In an NPR interview in January 2025, Buttu expressed concerns regarding the fragility of the ceasefire between Israel and Hamas. She criticized the Trump administration's approach, claiming it prioritized Israeli interests by lifting sanctions on Israeli settlers and resuming arms shipments, while neglecting provisions related to Palestinian prisoners and humanitarian aid. She further criticized the administration, saying that Trump's inner circle includes people who "want to ethnically cleanse Palestine, and they're going to do whatever it takes to ethnically cleanse Palestine. The fact that we're now seeing these people who are ideological and actually believe in ethnic cleansing, is terrifying as a Palestinian".

== See also ==
- Palestinian territories
