= Lena Khalaf Tuffaha =

Palestinian American poet

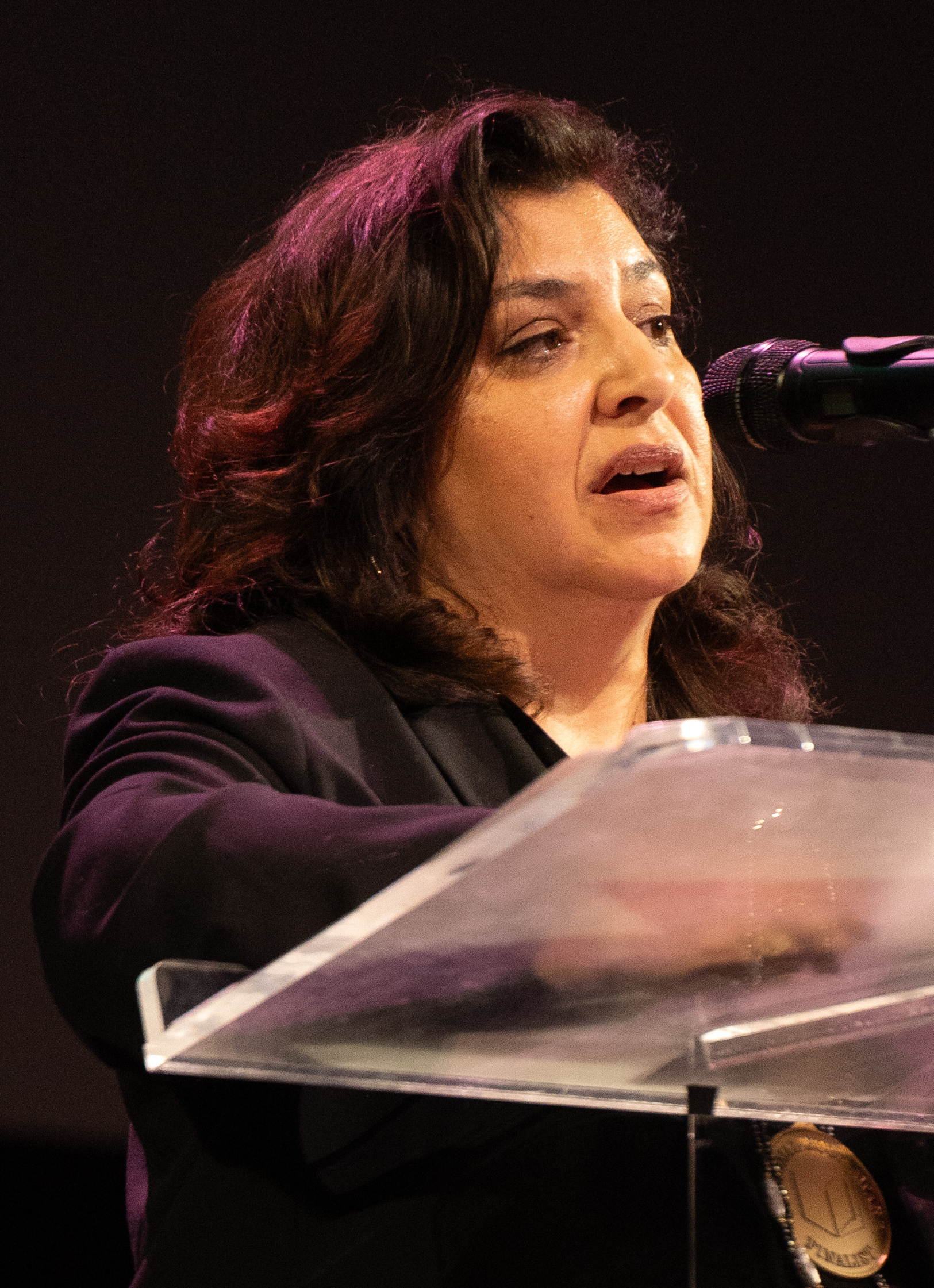
- Tuffaha reading at the 2024 National Book Awards
- Born: 1975 (age 50–51); Seattle, Washington, U.S.
- Education: University of Washington (BA); Pacific Lutheran University (MFA)
- Occupations: Poet; essayist; translator
- Writing career
- Notable work: Something About Living
- Notable awards: National Book Award for Poetry (2024); Washington State Book Award for Poetry (2018, 2025); George Ellenbogen Poetry Award (2025)
- Website: lenakhalaftuffaha.com

Lena Khalaf Tuffaha (born 1975) is a Palestinian American poet, essayist, and translator. She is the author of three poetry collections and two chapbooks, including Something About Living, which won the 2024 National Book Award for Poetry.

Her first collection, Water & Salt, won the 2018 Washington State Book Award for Poetry. Something About Living won the same award in 2025, as well as the 2025 George Ellenbogen Poetry Award.

== Early life and education ==
Tuffaha was born in Seattle in 1975. She grew up in Jordan, Saudi Arabia, and Kuwait before returning to the United States in September 1990. University of Washington Magazine described her heritage as Palestinian, Jordanian, and Syrian.

She earned a BA in comparative literature from the University of Washington and an MFA in poetry from Pacific Lutheran University's Rainier Writing Workshop.

== Career ==
In 2002, The Seattle Times quoted Tuffaha as an outreach worker for the Seattle chapter of the American-Arab Anti-Discrimination Committee. In 2005, she co-founded the Institute for Middle East Understanding.

Tuffaha's chapbook Arab in Newsland won the 2016 Two Sylvias Press Chapbook Prize and was published by Two Sylvias Press in 2017. Her debut full-length collection, Water & Salt, was published by Red Hen Press in 2017 and won the 2018 Washington State Book Award for Poetry.

In 2017, Tuffaha was named the inaugural poet-in-residence at Open Books: A Poem Emporium in Seattle. Her chapbook Letters from the Interior was published by Diode Editions in 2019. She received a 2019 Washington State Artist Trust Fellowship.

Her second full-length collection, Kaan and Her Sisters, was published by Trio House Press in 2023. It was a finalist for the 2024 Firecracker Award in poetry.

Tuffaha's third full-length collection, Something About Living, was published by the University of Akron Press in 2024. It won the 2022 Akron Poetry Prize and the 2024 National Book Award for Poetry. The book was selected for the 2025 American Library Association Notable Books List in poetry and shortlisted for the 2025 PEN Heaney Prize. In 2025, it won the Washington State Book Award for Poetry and the George Ellenbogen Poetry Award at the Arab American Book Awards.

Tuffaha's writing has appeared in journals including the Los Angeles Review of Books, The Nation, Prairie Schooner, and TriQuarterly. As a translator and editor, she was the translator and curator of the 2022 series Poems from Palestine at The Baffler and later curated the Words Without Borders series Against Silence: Palestinian Writing in English.

== Reception ==
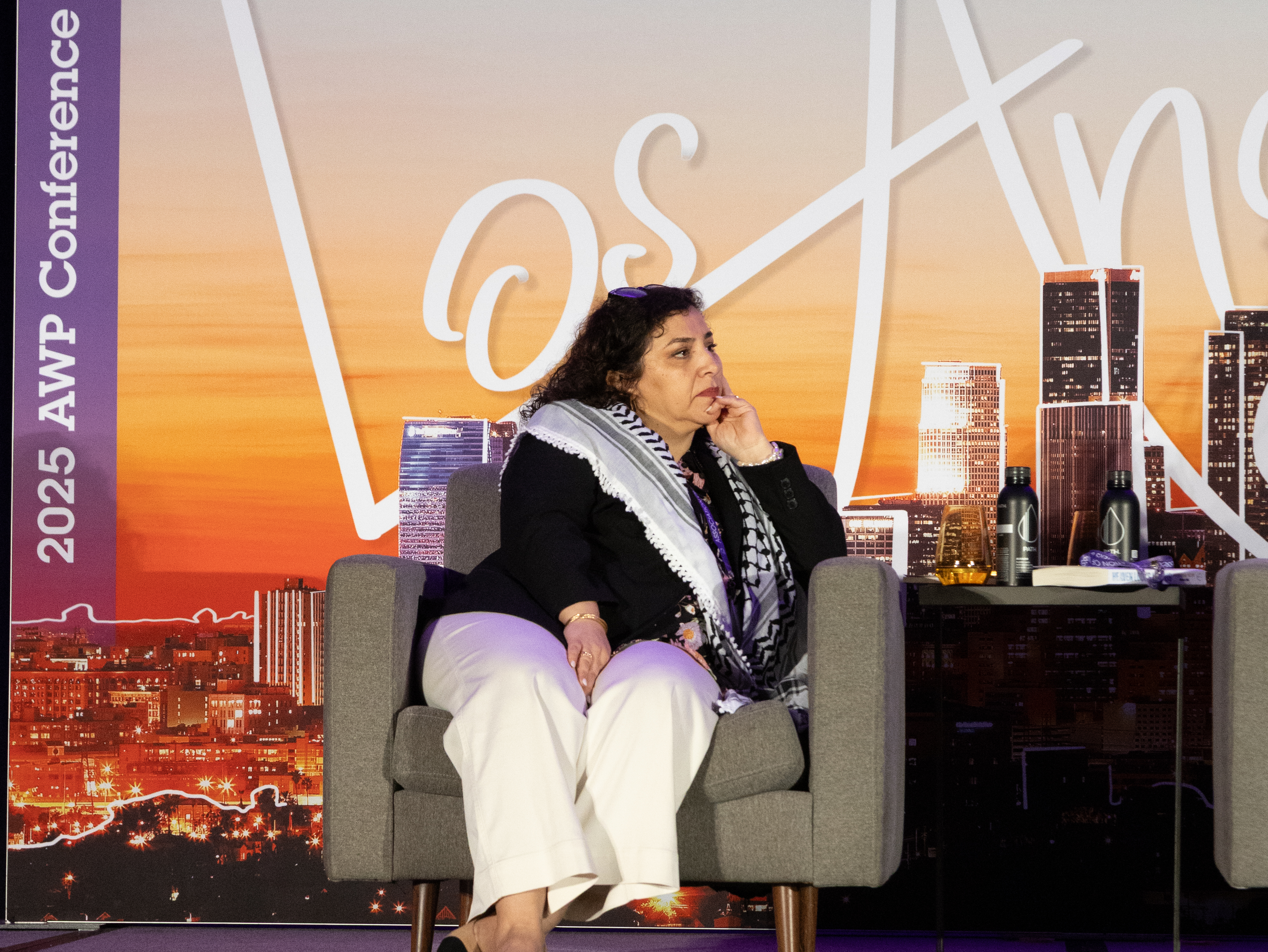
Tuffaha at the 2025 AWP Conference

In The Rumpus, Jenna Lê reviewed Water & Salt as a debut collection concerned with the capacity of language to convey "both beauty and horror". Lê also wrote that Tuffaha's verse was "rich with subtle verbal maneuvers" and discussed the collection's use of anaphora and multilingual experience.

Publishers Weekly called Kaan and Her Sisters an "imaginative and searching collection" and wrote that it uses intergenerational memory to examine survival, violence, family, and displacement. Reviewing Something About Living, the same magazine described Tuffaha's collection as a "superb volume" about homeland, heritage, and a "fairer future". In Poetry Northwest, Robin Myers wrote that there is "no consolation" in Something About Living and analyzed the book's repetition and documentary modes in relation to Palestinian dispossession.

== Works ==
=== Poetry collections ===
- Arab in Newsland. Two Sylvias Press. 2017. ISBN 978-0-9986314-9-3.
- Water & Salt. Red Hen Press. 2017. ISBN 978-1-59709-029-2.
- Letters from the Interior. Diode Editions. 2019. ISBN 978-1-939728-33-3.
- Kaan and Her Sisters. Trio House Press. 2023. ISBN 978-1-949487-14-5.
- Something About Living. University of Akron Press. 2024. ISBN 978-1-62922-273-8.
