= David Dodd Lee =

American poet, editor, and educator (born 1959)

- Born: 1959 (age 66–67)
- Occupations: Author; poet; editor; professor
- Website: seventeenfingeredpoetrybird.blogspot.com

David Dodd Lee (born 1959) is an American poet, editor, and educator.

== Biography ==
David Dodd Lee grew up in Michigan. He earned his undergraduate degree in painting and art history in 1986 and the MFA degree in creative writing in 1993, both from Western Michigan University. He is also a painter and collage artist. He is currently a professor of creative writing at Indiana University at South Bend and lives on the banks of the St. Joseph River in northern Indiana.

== Poetry and editing ==
Lee is the author of eleven full-length books of poems and a chapbook. He has published poems in many literary journals, including The Nation, Field, Denver Quarterly, CutBank, Gulf Coast, Green Mountains Review, Barrow Street, Cimarron Review, Pleiades, Chattahoochee Review, Diagram, Sycamore Review, Willow Springs, Quarterly West, Prairie Schooner, and American Literary Review. Also a fiction writer, he has published stories in Sou’wester, Green Mountains Review, and West Branch.

Lee is the director of 42 Miles Press, which is based in the Department of English at Indiana University South Bend. He serves as the judge for the annual 42 Miles Press Poetry Award. Winners of the book award include Mary Ann Samyn, Carrie Oeding, Erica Bernheim, Bill Rasmovicz, Tracey Knapp, Betsy Andrews, Kimberly Lambright, and Nate Pritts. Lee has twice served as the editor of SHADE, an annual anthology published by Four Way Books, and the former poetry editor of Passages North and Third Coast. In addition, he has guest edited recent editions of The Laurel Review (where he is an active contributing editor) and Passages North. He is also the editor of The Other Life, The Selected Poems of Herbert Scott (Carnegie Mellon University Press, 2010). Together with Donna Munro, he was editor of Half Moon Bay poetry chapbooks, which published titles by Franz Wright and Hugh Seidman, among others.

David Dodd Lee has published two books of erasure poems derived from the poetry of John Ashbery. Ashbery was receptive to this venture and wrote a blurb for the second book, And Others, Vaguer Presences (2017).

== Bibliography ==
=== Poetry ===
- Downsides of Fish Culture (New Issues Press 1997)
- Wilderness (March Street Press 2000)
- Arrow Pointing North (Four Way Books 2002)
- Abrupt Rural (New Issues Press 2004)
- The Nervous Filaments (Four Way Books 2010)
- Orphan, Indiana (University of Akron Press 2010)
- Sky Booths in the Breath Somewhere,: the Ashbery Erasure Poems (BlazeVOX 2010) ISBN 978-1-935-40287-9
- The Coldest Winter On Earth (Marick Press 2012)
- Animalities (Four Way Books 2014) ISBN 978-1-935-53648-2
- And Others, Vaguer Presences: A Book of Ashbery Erasure Poems (BlazeVOX 2017) ISBN 978-1-609-64259-4
- Unlucky Animals, Erasures, Dictionary Sonnets, and Collages (Wolfson Press, 2018)

=== Anthologies ===
- Shade 2004, Editor (Four Way Books, 2004)
- Shade 2006, Editor (Four Way Books, 2006)
- The Other Life: Selected Poems of Herbert Scott, Editor (Carnegie Mellon, 2010)
