= Michael Andregg =

American activist

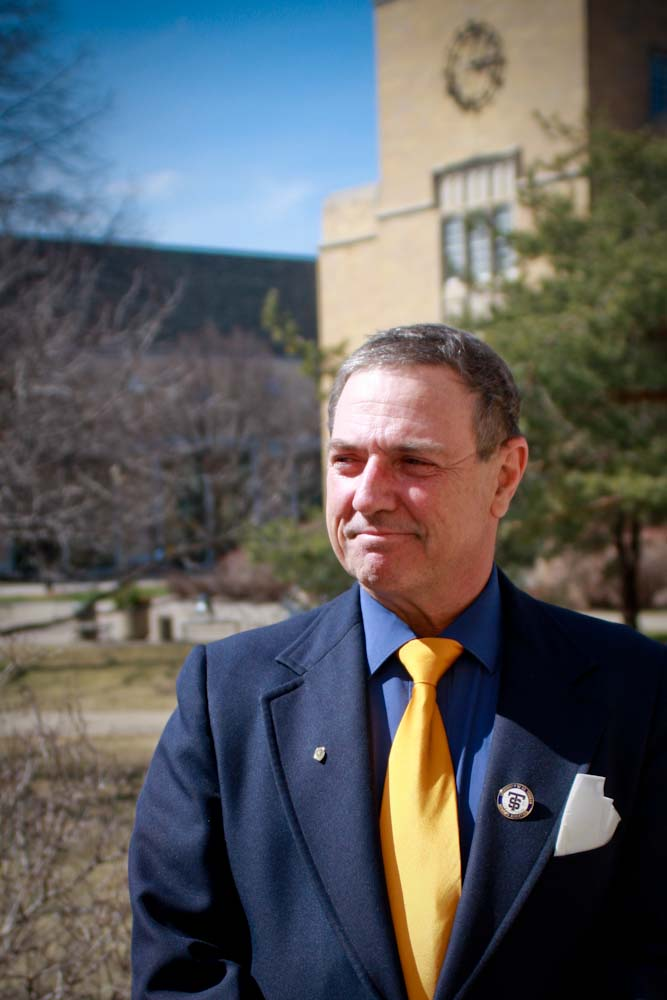
- Born: Michael Murphy Andregg; 1951 (age 74–75)
- Education: University of California, Davis
- Occupations: Educator, peace activist, author, documentarian
- Known for: Studies of the causes of war, human demographics, Peace and Conflict Studies

Michael Murphy Andregg (born 1951) is an American biologist, educator, researcher, and author known for his study of the causes of war, global problems related to war, sustainable development, intelligence ethics and his peace activism. He founded and directed for 30 years a non-profit organization called Ground Zero Minnesota dedicated to "top-quality, non-partisan education for informed democracy and human survival." Andregg has published numerous articles, study guides, documentaries and papers on biology, genetics, technology and contemporary social problems related to armed conflict. He has produced over 50 educational videos on wide-ranging subjects and his national award-winning book, On the Causes of War, was released in November 1997.

== Education ==
Andregg earned a Ph.D. in behavior genetics (1977) from the University of California, Davis after completing a triple-major B.S. in genetics, zoology and physical anthropology (1973). He studied under Theodosius Dobzhansky a prominent geneticist, evolutionary biologist and National Medal of Science recipient. During his university career, Andregg conducted field research on the behaviors of Barbary Apes (Macaca sylvanus) in the Atlas Mountains of Morocco and co-authored several articles with his mentor Dobzhansky, including "Distribution Among the Chromosomes of Drosophila pseudoobscura of the Genes Governing the Response to Light". and "Ecological Variables Affecting the Dispersal Behavior of Drosophila pseudoobscura and its Relatives." After completing two years of postdoctoral research at the University of Minnesota, he came to believe that war was a much greater public health hazard than rare diseases or abstract theories, and began to dedicate his life to the study of contemporary social problems, especially causes of war and sustainable development.

== Career ==
Andregg's study of global armed conflict and genocide resulted in his book, On the Causes of War, which won the International PeaceWriting Award in 1999, was reprinted twice, republished in Canada and translated into Italian. He taught undergraduate and graduate courses for 35 years as an adjunct at the University of Minnesota, with brief stints at Macalester and Gustavus Adolphus Colleges. He joined the Justice and Peace Studies faculty at the University of St. Thomas in 1993 and taught in the Aquinas Scholars program there until 2017. Andregg has lectured four times in South Korea and Japan on sustainable development, WMD and causes of wars, five times at Romania’s National Intelligence Academy, and at many other European conferences on intelligence reform, and human survival issues. He still lectures occasionally at American war and intelligence colleges, like the National Intelligence University, Army Command and General Staff College, and the Naval Postgraduate School.

In 1982, Andregg founded an educational, non-profit organization called Ground Zero Minnesota, which produced over 50 public television programs and sponsored about 5,000 educational programs in schools, churches, and civic groups on issues of peace and justice, many on the status and implications of weapons of mass destruction.

Andregg began studying the craft of intelligence-gathering, analysis, espionage and action focusing on intelligence reform. He has arranged and moderated over twenty panels for intelligence-related conferences around the world, and presented at dozens more. He wrote a chapter on intelligence ethics for a textbook on intelligence studies, a Handbook on Intelligence Ethics, and a similar chapter for The Oxford Handbook of National Security Intelligence in 2009.

His 2007 edited reader on intelligence ethics includes essays from 14 professionals from six countries. In 2008, Andregg released a documentary, Rethinking 9/11: Why Truth and Reconciliation are Better Strategies Than Global War, which examines certain unanswered questions of who was behind the September 11, 2001 attacks and calls for a full, impartial examination of the evidence.

Andregg is a frequent public speaker, lecturer, media commentator and mediator who has briefed Minnesota police, fire and public health officials on the effects of weapons of mass destruction.

In 2008, he acted as a liaison between peace activists and the local police department during the Republican National Convention, held in Saint Paul, Minnesota.

== Publications ==
- "Ultimate Causes of Wars (long-term, strategic causes) and Differing Roles for Intelligence Practitioners, Academics, and Policy Makers", in the Romanian Intelligence Studies Review, Nr. 19-20, pp. 237-256, 2018. https://animv.ro/revista-romana-de-studii-de-intelligence/
- "How to Escape Thucydides's Trap: A Dialogue among Sages", in Comparative Civilizations Review No. 79, Fall, 2018, pp. 114–128. http://hdl.handle.net/11299/208778
- Book Reviews of Graham Allison's Destined for War: Can America and China Escape Thucidydies's Trap?, 2017, John Pomfret's The Beautiful Country and the Middle Kingdom: America and China, 1776 to the Present, 2016, and Howard W. French's Everything Under the Heavens: How the Past Helps Shape China's Push for Global Power, 2017. Delivered at the 48th annual ISCSC Conference in Suzhou, China and published in Comparative Civilizations Review, No. 79, Fall, 2018, pp. 178-183. https://scholarsarchive.byu.edu/ccr/vol79/iss79/9/
- "Birth Rates Determine Life Expectancy in Theoretical Equilibrium Populations: Implications for Political Demography and Conflict Early Warning", in the American Intelligence Journal, Vol. 35, No. 2, 2018. http://hdl.handle.net/11299/208814
- "Intelligence Ethics: An Uncompleted Project", delivered at ISA in San Francisco, April 5, 2018 and accessible at: http://hdl.handle.net/11299/210174
- "The Developing Global Crisis: A Strategic Paradigm for Understanding Global Conflicts Today", delivered at ISA in Baltimore, February 25, 2017 and accessible at: http://hdl.handle.net/11299/210171
- "Ethical Implications of the Snowden Revelations", International Journal of Intelligence, Security and Public Affairs, Vol. 18, No. 2, pp. 110–131, 2016. http://www.tandfonline.com/doi/abs/10.1080/23800992.2016.1196942?journalCode=usip20
- "Intelligence and Migration: Cases from North America", for the Sixth "Need to Know" conference, at Karlskrona, Sweden, November 17–18, 2016. Published in proceedings by the Polish Institute of National Remembrance. http://hdl.handle.net/11299/208819
- "Some Comparisons with End Times Thinking Elsewhere and a Theory", in Comparative Civilizations Review, Vol. 75, No. 75, 2016. http://scholarsarchive.byu.edu/ccr/vol75/iss75/8/
- "The Developing Global Crisis and the Current Wave of Migrant/Refugees Heading for Europe" delivered to the 21st "Intelligence in the Knowledge Society" conference of the National Intelligence Academy of Romania "Mihai Viteazul", October 16, 2016. http://hdl.handle.net/11299/210225
- "Why Fight? An Essay on the Morality of Wars: When to Start them, How to Fight them, and When Not to". Presented in October, 2016 at the 21st IKS conference, published by Editura Academiei Nationale de Informatii, "Mihai Viteazul," Bucharest, Romania, 2016, pp. 21 – 40. http://iksconference.ro/wp-content/uploads/2017/04/Proceedings-IKS-2015-1.pdf
- "Why Fight? An Essay on the Morality of Wars: When to Start them, How to Fight them, and When Not to". Presented to the US Army Command and General Staff College 2016 Ethics Symposium, April 20, 2016. http://www.cgscfoundation.org/wp-content/uploads/2016/04/Andregg-Why-Fight.pdf
- "Demographics and Conflict" in the American Intelligence Journal of the National Military Intelligence Association, Vol. 33, No. 1, 2016, pp. 74–78. http://hdl.handle.net/11299/208813
- "The US Decision to Invade Iraq in March, 2003, Chasing Phantom WMDs: How Human Intelligence was Used, Abused and Politicized to "fix the facts around the policy". Published in the Proceedings of the Fifth "Need to Know" conference sponsored by the Institute of National Remembrance of Poland, in Greifswald, Germany, November 5–6, 2015. https://geschichte.uni-greifswald.de/arbeitsbereiche/lehrstuehle/ng/ng-tag/need-to-know-v/
- "Community Policing and Ideal Security Officers in Best Practice Intelligence Organizations", in the Proceedings of the 2015 Intelligence in the Knowledge Society conference of the National Intelligence Academy of Romania, Oct. 9, 2015. http://animv.ro/en/volum-iks-2015/
- Editors Peter Gill and Michael Andregg, "Democratization of Intelligence", March 19, 2015, Routledge. https://www.amazon.com/Democratization-Intelligence-Peter-Gill/dp/1138855316
- "Intelligence Ethics: A Key to Much Bigger Issues", a paper delivered to a conference of the US Army Command and General Staff College, Ft. Leavenworth, Kansas, USA, April 2015. http://www.cgscfoundation.org/wp-content/uploads/2015/04/Andregg-IntelligenceEthics.pdf
- The Developing Global Crisis, a video for youth about that huge problem, BOMEProductions, April 2015. https://www.youtube.com/watch?v=RLyMB3KGWck
- Seven Billion and Counting, a textbook for young readers, Twenty First Century Books, an imprint of Lerner Press, Minneapolis, MN, January 2014. https://www.amazon.com/Seven-Billion-Counting-Crisis-Population/dp/0761367152/ref=sr_1_1?ie=UTF8&qid=1388779014&sr=8-1&keywords=michael+andregg
- "Religion for a Sustainable Civilization", pp. 215–228, http://hdl.handle.net/11299/212112 and "Corruption of Institutions and the Decay of Civilizations", pp. 251–262, http://hdl.handle.net/11299/212113 in Spirituality and Civilization Sustainability in the 21st Century, edited by Andrew Targowski and Marek J. Celinsky, New York, NY: Nova Science Publishers, 2013.
- Editors Peter Gill and Michael Andregg, "Democratization of Intelligence", March 19, 2015, Routledge. https://www.amazon.com/Democratization-Intelligence-Peter-Gill/dp/1138855316
- "Religion for Sustainable Civilization", pp. 41–54 in Dialogue and Universalism, 2-2012, published in Warsaw, Poland by the Polish section of the SOCIÉTÉ EUROPÉENNE DE CULTURE, October 2012. http://dialogueanduniversalism.eu/wp-content/uploads/2012/11/2012-2.pdf
- Interview on "Ethics for Intelligence Analysts" in Foreknowledge, Vol. 5, pg. 10, South Africa, October 2012. https://web.archive.org/web/20131008024028/http://www.foreknowledge.info/ForeknowledgeIssue5.pdf
- “A Critical Lesson not yet Learned in America: Intelligence Ethics Matter”, delivered to a conference on lessons learned from the Cold War at Syddansk University in Odense, Denmark, October 16, 2012, published in proceedings by the Polish Institute of National Remembrance. http://hdl.handle.net/11299/208816 http://www.sdu.dk/da/om_sdu/institutter_centre/c_koldkrig/aktiviteter/need+to+know/need+to+know+ii
- "Why Real Ethics and True Wisdom are Keys to Keeping Intelligence Agencies Guardians of the People, Instead of Persecutors of the People", delivered to a conference on “Intelligence in the Knowledge Society” at the Mihai Viteazul National Intelligence Academy in Bucharest, Romania, on October 19, 2012. Published in the Proceedings of IKS 2012, by Editura Academiei Nationale de Informatii, “Mihai Viteazul” editors Teodoru Stefan and Irena Dumitru, pp. 203-216, in Bucharest, 2013. https://iksconference.ro/wp-content/uploads/2017/04/IKS_2013_PDF.pdf
- “Do Intelligence Bureaucracies Fear Ethics?” in the International Journal of Intelligence Ethics, Vol. 3, No. 2, Fall 2012, http://hdl.handle.net/11299/208853 .
- “Clashes of Civilizations gave Rise to Martial Arts, but Enlightened Martial Philosophies Reveal the Better Way,” in the Proceedings of the 2012 ISCSC Conference, DeVry University, Washington D.C., June 6–9, 2012. http://hdl.handle.net/11299/208779 . Published by the Civilizations Press, Kalamazoo, MI, 2013.
- “The Moral Crisis in U.S. Security,” pp. 26-28 in the Proceedings of the 2011 ISCSC Conference, Tulane University, New Orleans, LA, USA, June 2011. Published by the Civilizations Press, Kalamazoo, MI, 2012, http://hdl.handle.net/11299/211678 .
- "The Mountain Meadows Massacre of 1857: A Civilizational Encounter With Lessons for Us All", in Comparative Civilizations Review, No. 64, pp 38 – 52, spring 2011. http://hdl.handle.net/11299/208780 https://scholarsarchive.byu.edu/ccr/vol64/iss64/5/
- “The Birth of Professional Ethos: Some Comparisons among Medicine, Law and Intelligence Communities” in the American Intelligence Journal, pp. 82–92, Vol. 28, No. 1, 2010, http://hdl.handle.net/11299/208758 .
- "Ethics for Intelligence Professionals", Chapter 44 in The Oxford Handbook for National Security Intelligence. Oxford University Press, 2009. https://www.oxfordhandbooks.com/view/10.1093/oxfordhb/9780195375886.001.0001/oxfordhb-9780195375886-e-0044
- "A Symposium on Intelligence Ethics" in Intelligence and National Security, Vol. 24, No. 3, pp. 366–386, June 2009. https://www.tandfonline.com/doi/abs/10.1080/02684520903036958?needAccess=true&journalCode=fint20
- "Why Population Pressure and Militant Religion are the Most Important Causes of the Developing Global Crisis," in Comparative Civilizations Review, No. 61, Fall 2009, pp 65–86, http://hdl.handle.net/11299/208781 .
- "Dakota Land in 1862, a Genocide Forgotten: How Civilizational Transformation can get lost in the Fading Rate of History", in Comparative Civilizations Review, No. 59, Fall 2008, pp 73–98, http://hdl.handle.net/11299/208773 https://scholarsarchive.byu.edu/ccr/vol59/iss59/6/ .
- "Intelligence Ethics: the definitive work of 2007", *editor, with contributions from 14 intelligence professionals from six countries, 2007. Published by Ground Zero Minnesota, St. Paul, MN, USA. http://hdl.handle.net/11299/46979 or https://static1.squarespace.com/static/5750629760b5e9d6697be6cd/t/59963a81d482e9edaffa67ed/1503017604395/On+the+Causes+of+War.pdf
- "Intelligence Ethics: Laying a Foundation for the Second Oldest Profession", Chapter 4 in the Handbook for Intelligence Studies, Routledge Press, 2007, 2009 edited by Loch Johnson. https://www.taylorfrancis.com/books/e/9780203089323/chapters/10.4324%2F9780203089323-12dchild=1&keywords=Handbook+of+intelligence+studies&qid=1587036989&s=books&sr=1-2
- "Sustainable Development" http://hdl.handle.net/11299/210222 and "Debating to Win" http://hdl.handle.net/11299/210161 published by Busan National University in South Korea in support of lectures for their masters of business administration, graduate and undergraduate economics students, 2007.
- Book Review of “Glimpses of Igbo Culture and Civilization” edited by Okolie Animba, published by Computer Edge Publications, Lagos, Nigeria, 2000. In Comparative Civilizations Review, No. 53, Fall 2005, pp. 125–127. https://scholarsarchive.byu.edu/ccr/vol53/iss53/11/
- "Why the Intelligence Community (IC) System Drives you Crazy, and How to Come in from the Cold", in Proceedings of the 12th annual conference on Intelligence Reform sponsored by Open Source Solutions, Washington D.C., April 12, 2004. 22 pages text. http://www.oss.net/dynamaster/file_archive/040318/0a0242e77745663dabeb1c496a08dbc7/OSS2003-01-17.pdf
- Book review of "Instant Nirvana: Americanization of Mysticism and Meditation" by Ashok Kumar Malhotra. In Comparative Civilizations Review, No. 50, Spring 2004, pp. 118–120. https://scholarsarchive.byu.edu/ccr/vol50/iss50/11/
- How 'Wisdom' Differs from Intelligence and Knowledge in the Context of National Intelligence Systems, ISA, 2003. http://hdl.handle.net/11299/208759 or https://static1.squarespace.com/static/5750629760b5e9d6697be6cd/t/5996406ae4fcb50cf88f4646/1503019115521/ISA+paper+2003+How+Wisdom+differs+from+knowledge+in+Intel+context.pdf
- "The State of the Academic Tribe in 2003 as it Relates to Understanding the State of the World", in Proceedings of the 11th annual conference on Intelligence Reform sponsored by Open Source Solutions, Washington D.C., September 17, 2003. 4 pages text with 16 power point slides. http://www.oss.net/dynamaster/file_archive/040318/0a0242e77745663dabeb1c496a08dbc7/OSS2003-01-17.pdf
- "Building Bridges Between Cultures", March 2002, 13 pp., published by Pusan National University, in Pusan, South Korea. http://hdl.handle.net/11299/208815 Republished in the Journal of International and Area Studies, Vol. 20 No. 1, 2002, pp. 89–105.
- "Ethical Dilemmas in War and Peace," April 2002, published by Pusan National University, in Pusan, South Korea. http://hdl.handle.net/11299/212376
- "Invasions and Border Disputes" a chapter in The Encyclopedia of Conflicts Since World War Two, Vol. 2, pp. 44 – 59, published by M.E. Sharp Inc., Armonk, NY: March 1999. https://www.vitalsource.com/products/encyclopedia-of-conflicts-since-world-war-ii-james-ciment-v9781136596216?duration=90
- On the Causes of War, 288 pages, October 1997, revised and republished, October 1999 after winning the International PeaceWriting Award in May, 1999. This book was also reprinted in abridged form (102 pp) by the Canadian Peace Research Institute in Dundas, Ontario, Canada, and has been translated into Italian. http://hdl.handle.net/11299/209893
- "U.S. Covert Actions: Blowback Exemplified," in Viewpoints on War, Peace and Global Cooperation, 1996-97 edition, pp. 12–24. The Wisconsin Institute, University of Wisconsin, Stevens Point.
- "Low Intensity Conflict at the Hubert H. Humphrey Institute: a report about spies and related problems." 32 pages, January 1990, Ground Zero MN.
- "How to Survive War", February 1989, 21 pages, Ground Zero MN.
- "Nuclear War and National Security Study Guide", September 1984, 80 pages. Endorsed and distributed by the Minnesota Department of Education.
- "The Larger Implications of Personal Rapid Transit". Spring 1983 edition of Minnesota Technolog, Institute of Technology, University of Minnesota.
- "The Biological Bases of War", In Behavior Genetics 9:5, September 1979.
- "Identity as a Causal Factor Influencing Complex Behavioral Phenotypes: a Model". In Behavior Genetics 8:6, November 1978.
- "Learning in Drosophila? Experimental Evidence for Response Perseveration and Theoretical Implications". In Behavior Genetics, 8:1, 1978.
- "An Interdemic Selection Model for the Evolution of Altruistic Traits". In Genetics, 86:2, s2, 1977.
- "Interdemic Selection via Frequency Dependent Group Mortality.” In Behavior Genetics, 7:1, 1977.
- "Distribution of Geotaxis Genes Among the Chromosomes of Selected Populations of Drosophila pseudoobscura.” In Genetics, 83:3, 1976.
- Dobzhansky, Theodosius, J.R. Powell, C. Taylor and M. Andregg. "Ecological Variables Affecting the Dispersal Behavior of Drosophila pseudoobscura and its Relatives". In Genetics, 83:2, 1976.
- Powell, J.R., C. Taylor, R. Lock, and M. Andregg. "Habitat Preferences in Natural Populations of Drosophila". In Nature, March, 1976.
- Dobzhansky, Theodosius, Olga Pavlovski and Michael Andregg. "Distribution Among the Chromosomes of Drosophila pseudoobscura of the Genes Governing the Response to Light". In Genetics, 81:2, 1975.

== Awards ==
- January 17, 2006, recipient of a “Golden Candle Award” from OSS Inc. for “bringing light to dark corners of the intelligence community” for published work on mental illness among spies and on organizational obstacles to reform of dysfunctions in the American intelligence community.
- In May, 1999, “On the Causes of War” (first published in 1997, reprinted in 1999 and 2007) won the International PeaceWriting Award administered by the English Department of the University of Arkansas, Fayetteville, for "the outstanding work on peace in North America" that year. https://static1.squarespace.com/static/5750629760b5e9d6697be6cd/t/59963a81d482e9edaffa67ed/1503017604395/On+the+Causes+of+War.pdf
- In 1998, he was included in the International Who's Who of Intellectuals, and the Dictionary of International Biography.
- One of 43 academics invited to the first, and then second Open Sources Conferences sponsored by the office of the then new Director of National Intelligence, Washington D.C., July 16–17, 2007, and in September 2008.
- Stony Award, Fridley Community Cable, Public-access television, for best independent video documentary production, 1992. Title: "A Crisis for Democracy, Corruption in Government".
- Peter J. Shields Fellow, University of California, Davis, 1975-76.
- Field Research on Macaca sylvanus, Morocco (grant), 1973, under D. Taub, UCD anthropology
- National Merit Scholarship Finalist, 1968.
