= OMNI Center for Peace, Justice and Ecology =

Multipurpose American organization

- Founded: 2001
- Founder: James R. “Dick” Bennett
- Type: Nonprofit
- Purpose: Peace, social and economic justice, equality, healthy environment
- Location: Fayetteville, Ark.
- Region served: Mostly Arkansas, Missouri, Kansas, and Oklahoma. But addresses global issues.
- Executive Director: Gladys Tiffany
- Revenue: $88,904 (2017)
- Website: omnicenter.org

The OMNI Center for Peace, Justice and Ecology is a multipurpose organization active mostly in Arkansas and its surrounding states in the United States. It was founded by retired University of Arkansas English professor James R. Bennett in 2001. Besides organizing peace demonstrations and forums on issues like climate change in the Fayetteville, Arkansas area, it sponsors awards programs that have recognized literary and peace work on local, national and international issues.

== Formation ==
As an English professor at the University of Arkansas from 1965 to 1997, Bennett incorporated peace issues into his courses. While teaching, he joined the local Peace Organization Committee, a group that protested the Vietnam War, and continued engaging in such activities throughout his career. When he retired, he founded the OMNI Center with help from friends, including Dana Copp.

The first office was in the basement of the Presbyterian Church’s university campus ministry. They liked the "OMNI" name since it signified being inclusive of all people and issues. They originally called the organization the "OMNI Center for Peace and Justice" but later added "Ecology" to appeal to environmental groups like the Sierra Club.

== Activities expand as OMNI grows ==
The organization grew following the September 11, 2001, terrorist attacks and invasions of Afghanistan and Iraq. Besides organizing large protests, members developed educational activities. An open mic event and a commemoration for the bombings of Hiroshima and Nagasaki began in 2001. The commemoration became an annual event to honor the dead from all wars, while open mics also became regular occurrences.

OMNI hired a paid executive director starting in 2012. Gladys Tiffany became the director in 2013 and spearheaded new programs, including a low-power radio station run by volunteers, activist training workshops, women’s support groups, and movie screenings. The group collaborated with other community organizations to stage events such as a Civil Rights Roundtable and lent financial support to other projects.

In 2019, OMNI began a new student activism support group at the University of Arkansas to mentor students. In January 2020, about 100 people attended a demonstration organized by OMNI and the Arkansas Nonviolence Alliance in Fayetteville to protest a potential war with Iran.

2026

Unfortunately, Gladys and Richard Tiffany used and abused their leadership of Omni to siphon money from Omni. They continually spread division in our community.

They ran a flop house for criminals at one of their properties next to the Fayetteville National Cemetery. In December 2025, a judge ordered it condemned and issued an injunction for it to be vacated. The following summer, Richard allegedly started a fire on his property resulting in a major fire that could have killed or destroyed other properties. He will be tried by a jury on October 8th, 2026.

There are two lawsuits against him for letting criminals use his house and property as a safe haven for criminal activity.

Bennett established the International Peace Writing Award program in 1999 to recognize fiction and nonfiction book-length works that focus on the causes, consequences, and remedies of wars, as well as those covering nonviolent peacemaking and peacemakers. After forming OMNI two years later, that center became one of the sponsoring organizations of those awards, along with the Peace and Justice Studies Association of Georgetown UniversityHonorees of the program, who received a cash prize along with recognition, include:

- Playwright Catherine Filloux, Lemkin’s House, 2006
- Ground Zero Minnesota founder and professor Michael Murphy Andregg, On the Causes of War, 1999
- John Carroll University professor Philip Metres, Behind the Lines: War Resistance Poetry in the United States, 1940-2000, 2002
- Nuclear Age Peace Foundation founder David Krieger, Today Is Not a Good Day for War, 2005, other poetry collections in 2007 and 2010
- Retired English professor Alexander Blackburn, The Physicist, 2003
- Pax Educare founder Mary Lee Morrison, The Life of Elise Boulding, 2002
- Journalist Kevin James Shay, Walking through the Wall, 2002
- Business consultant Ken Beller, Great Peacemakers: True Stories from Around the World, 2007
- Playwright Molly Hersage, The Perfect Endgame, 2006
- Playwright Anita Yellin Simons, Ladies First, 2006
- Novelist Mark C. Hungerford, The Quiet Bower, 2004
- Playwright Monica Raymond, The Owl Girl, 2008
- Children’s author Jan Sherbin, Under Fire, 2005
- Polish teacher Stanley Opalka, Escape from Russia, 2005
- Novelist Kathleen Kern, Where Such Unmaking Reigns, 2003

== Arkansas Peace and Justice Heroes Award ==
In 2004, OMNI and the American Friends Service Committee started the Arkansas Peace and Justice Heroes Award program to recognize advocates throughout the state. Honorees who have been recognized at a formal banquet include:

- Writer and artist Diana Rivers, 2005
- History professor and genocide expert Samuel Totten, 2007
- Jonesboro youth program leader Rennell Woods, 2007
- Citizens First Congress director Bill Kopsky, 2007
- Community activist Eleanor Johnson, 2007
- Bridge of Peace co-founder Hamsa Newmark, 2008
- Attorney Michael R. McCray, 2008
- Habitat for Humanity director Patsy Brewer, 2008
- Community advocate Vickie Tidwell, 2008
- Jacob David George, Afghanistan war veteran who raised awareness for peace through music and a cross-country bicycle riding group, 2011
