= Jason Koo =

American poet, editor, and teacher

- Born: New York City, U.S.
- Education: Yale University (BA); University of Houston (MFA); University of Missouri (PhD)
- Occupations: Poet; editor; teacher
- Writing career
- Years active: 2009–present
- Genre: Poetry
- Notable works: Man on Extremely Small Island; America's Favorite Poem; More Than Mere Light; No Rest
- Notable awards: De Novo Poetry Prize; Yes Poetry Poet of the Month (2021); Connecticut Poetry Circuit Poet (2024)

Jason Koo is an American poet, editor, and teacher. He is the author of four poetry collections, including the debut poetry collection Man on Extremely Small Island from 2009; his poetry has appeared in Poetry Northwest, Diode Poetry Journal, and other publications. He is a professor and director of creative writing at Quinnipiac University and is the founder and as of 2024, former executive director of the nonprofit Brooklyn Poets.

== Early life and education ==
Koo, a second-generation Korean American, was born in New York City but grew up in Cleveland; many of his poems concern the latter city as well as its natives such as LeBron James. Koo later graduated from Yale University with a BA in English. Afterward, he attended the MFA program at the University of Houston and learned under Edward Hirsch and others. He also holds a PhD in English and creative writing from the University of Missouri-Columbia.

== Poetry ==
Koo's poetry has appeared in Poetry Northwest, Jet Fuel Review, Diode Poetry Journal, and others. His influences throughout his life have been "Proust, Melville, Cervantes, DeLillo, etc. ... Ashbery, Levis, Crane, Stevens, Koch, Whitman, Byron (in Don Juan), Wordsworth, Bidart, Lynda Hull ... the list goes on."

In 2009, Koo published his debut poetry collection, Man on Extremely Small Island. It had been published by C&R Press after Denise Duhamel selected it for the De Novo Poetry Prize. In 2014, Koo released his second poetry collection, America's Favorite Poem, with C&R Press. Later, in 2018, he released his third, More Than Mere Light, with Prelude Books. It was a semi-finalist for the Cleveland State University Poetry Center's Open Book Poetry Competition. Several of Koo's books were reissued in 2020 by Brooklyn Arts Press. In 2024, Koo released No Rest with Diode Editions after winning the Diode Editions Poetry Contest.

== Teaching and directing ==
On May 31, 2012—the same day as Walt Whitman's birthday—Koo founded Brooklyn Poets, a nonprofit for the literary arts in New York City. Previously he had taught and directed the English MA program at Lehman College; near the end of his contract, Koo thought to himself, "why not try to design my ideal poetry curriculum and see if I can teach students privately and make ends meet that way, rather than getting paid next to nothing as an adjunct teaching composition?" Shortly after founding Brooklyn Poets, Koo was hired to teach in the English department at Quinnipiac University. Later, he became the director of its creative writing program.

Brooklyn Poet's programming includes workshops, mentorship through a network called The Bridge, monthly events, writer's retreats, and a reading series. Some of the first poets Koo hired for workshops were Dorothea Lasky, Bianca Stone, and J. Scott Brownlee. In 2017, Brooklyn Poets released an anthology co-edited by Koo and Joe Pan. Koo is currently on leave from Brooklyn Poets.

== Accolades ==
In March 2016, Koo was named 21st in Brooklyn Magazine's list of the 100 most influential people in Brooklyn culture. In June 2021, Koo was Yes Poetry's poet of the month. In October 2024, Koo was selected as a Connecticut Poetry Circuit Poet.
