= Tyler Mills =

American poet

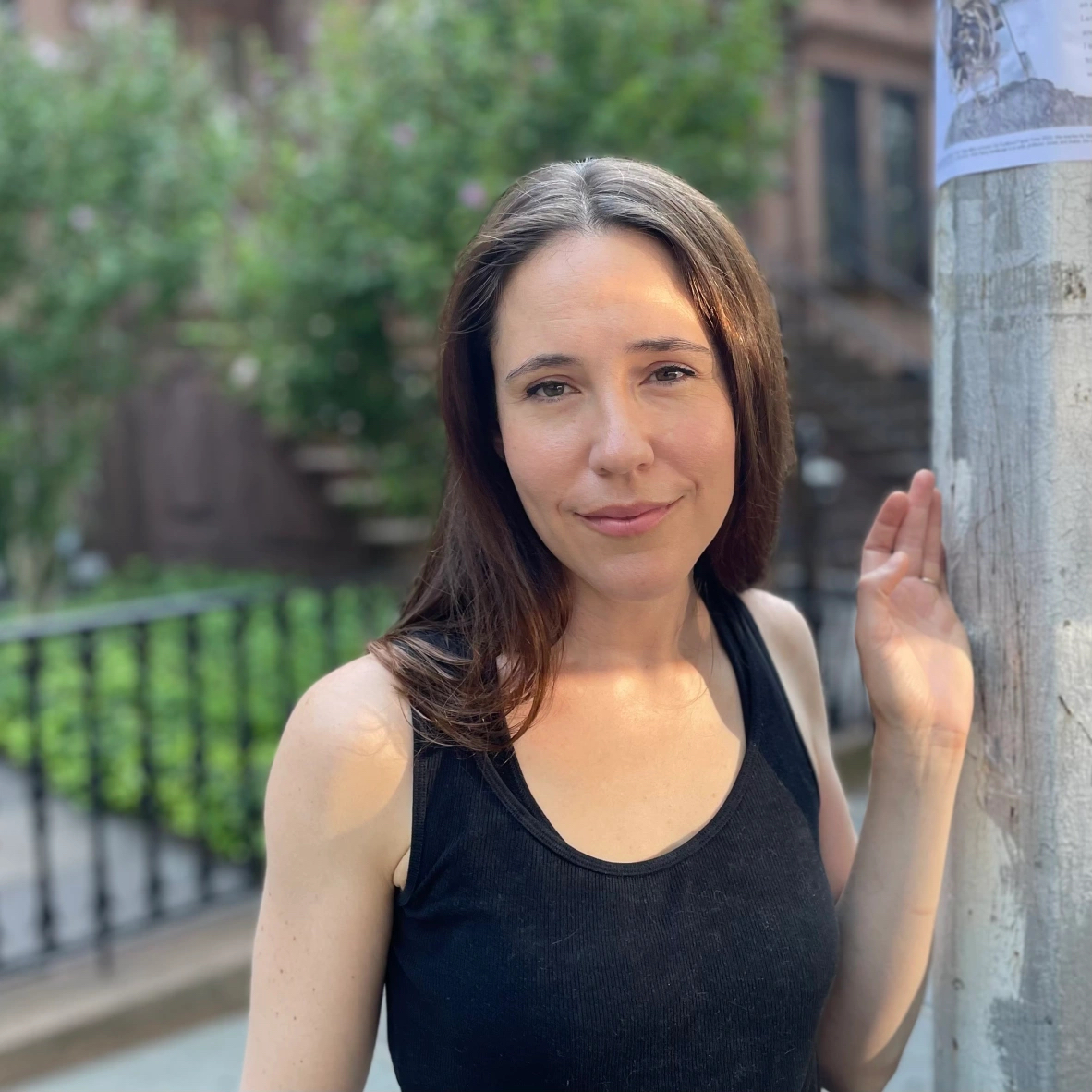
- Occupations: Writer and educator

Tyler Mills is an American poet, essayist, editor, and scholar. She is editor-in-chief of The Account, an assistant professor of English at New Mexico Highlands University and the author of Hawk Parable, winner of the 2017 Akron Poetry Prize (University of Akron Press 2019) and Tongue Lyre, winner of the 2011 Crab Orchard Series in Poetry First Book Award (Southern Illinois University Press 2013). She is also an editor and teacher and lives in Brooklyn, NY.

== Work ==
Hawk Parable was included in The Millions must-read poetry April 2019. Tongue Lyre was fourth on the Believer's "Readers Favorite Works of Poetry in 2013" list. Her poetry publications include The New Yorker, The Believer (magazine), the Boston Review, and Blackbird (journal)

== Awards ==
- 2017 Akron Poetry Prize
- 2015 Copper Nickel Editor's Prize in Prose
- 2011 Crab Orchard Series in Poetry First Book Award
- 2009 Richard Peterson Poetry Prize, Crab Orchard Review
- 2008 Third Coast prize
- Best New Poets 2007 anthology.
- 2006 Gulf Coast Poetry Prize

== Bibliography ==
=== Collections ===
- Mills, Tyler (2019). Hawk Parable. Akron, OH: The University of Akron Press.
- Mills, Tyler (2013). Tongue Lyre. Carbondale, IL: Crab Orchard Review & Southern Illinois University Press.

=== Anthologies ===
- Best new poets 2007. Trethewey, Natasha D., 1966-, Livingood, Jeb. Charlottesville, Va: Samovar Press. 2007. ISBN 0976629623. OCLC 154793308.
- Women Write Resistance : poets resist gender violence. Wiseman, Laura Madeline. Pittsburgh, Penn.: Hyacinth Girl Press. 2013. ISBN 978-0615772783. OCLC 829936662.
- Bax : best American experimental writing. 2015. Abramson, Seth, 1976-, Damiani, Jesse, Kearney, Douglas,. Middletown, Connecticut. ISBN 0819576085. OCLC 944156411.
- Still life with poem : contemporary natures mortes in verse. Dubrow, Jehanne,, Lusby, Lindsay. Chestertown, Maryland. 2016. ISBN 978-0937692233. OCLC 958799538.
- The manifesto project. Hazelton, Rebecca, 1978-, Parker, Alan Michael, 1961- (First ed.). Akron, Ohio. 2017. ISBN 978-1629220499. OCLC 974132446.
- Peter., Kahn (2017-01-15). The golden shovel anthology : new poems honoring Gwendolyn Brooks. Shankar, Ravi., Smith, Patricia. [Place of publication not identified]. ISBN 978-1682260241. OCLC 966359984.

=== List of poems ===
Title	Year	First published	Reprinted/collected
The sun rising, Pacific Theatre	2015	Mills, Tyler (May 4, 2015). "The sun rising, Pacific Theatre". The New Yorker. Vol. 91, no. 11. p. 31.	
