= Khaldoun Baghdadi =

American attorney

Khaldoun Baghdadi is a prominent Palestinian-American attorney and former chairman of the San Francisco Human Rights Commission. He was born in Amman, Jordan, but grew up in Orange County, California.

Baghdadi received his undergraduate degree from the University of California Irvine, and also received a fellowship to study at Bir Zeit University, in Ramallah, West Bank. He later earned his law degree from UC Hastings College of the Law, in 1997.

Baghdadi is a UC Law, San Francisco Game Changer known for his sincerity in the courtroom. His early life experience as a first-generation Palestinian American drew him to advocacy and the importance of understanding law so that he can better represent those who need help.

In 2016, Baghdadi was a part of the Pinnacle hip implant litigation trial team which resulted in a total verdict of more than $1 billion.

He is a partner with Walkup, Melodia, Kelly, and Schoenberger in San Francisco, California. In 2003, he was appointed to the San Francisco Human Rights Commission, and in 2006 was elected its chairman.
