= Helmut Willke =

German sociologist (1945–2024)

Helmut Willke (30 May 1945 – 15 January 2024) was a German sociologist who studied the effect of globalization on modern society. He coined the term Atopia to denote a society that exists without borders, with no national identity. He was professor at Zeppelin University in Friedrichshafen, Germany. Helmut Willke has been teaching planning and decision theory since 1983 in the Bielefeld University's department of sociology, and state theory and global governance since 2002. He also held visiting professorships in Washington, D.C., Geneva and Vienna. His main areas of interest and praxis are in systems theory, state theory, global governance and global regime building; organizational development, systems dynamics and systems guidance; and knowledge management (introduction, instruments, strategies). He participated in Social Trends Institute's Experts Meeting "Family Policies in the Western Countries". Willke was born in Tailfingen on 30 May 1945, and died in Cologne on 15 January 2024, at the age of 78.

== Works ==
- Systemtheorie I. Eine Einführung in die Grundprobleme. 7th Edition, Stuttgart 2004 (UTB)
- Systemtheorie II: Interventionstheorie. 3rd Edition, Stuttgart 1999 (UTB)
- Systemtheorie III: Steuerungstheorie. 3rd Edition, Stuttgart 1995 (UTB)
- Ironie des Staates, Frankfurt 1992 (Suhrkamp)
- Supervision des Staates, Frankfurt 1997 (Suhrkamp)
- Systemisches Wissensmanagement, Stuttgart 1998 (UTB)
- Atopia – Studien zur atopischen Gesellschaft, Suhrkamp, 2001
- Dystopia, Frankfurt 2002 (Suhrkamp)
- Heterotopia, Frankfurt 2003 (Suhrkamp).
