= Sandra Simonds =

American poet

- Born: 1977 (age 48–49); Washington, D.C.
- Citizenship: American
- Education: University of Montana; University of California, Los Angeles; Florida State University
- Writing career
- Genres: Poetry, Fiction
- Notable awards: Cleveland State Poetry Prize, Akron Poetry Prize

Sandra Simonds is an American poet, critic and novelist. The author of eight books of poetry, her poems have been included in Best American Poetry and have appeared in literary journals including Poetry, The New Yorker, The New York Times, American Poetry Review, Ploughshares, Granta, Boston Review, and Fence. In 2013, she won a Readers’ Choice Award for her sonnet “Red Wand.” Her poetry reviews have been featured on the Poetry Foundation Website, the New York Times, the Harvard Review and the Kenyon Review. She is the 2023 winner of the Vermont Book Award in fiction.

Simonds earned her Ph.D. in English and Poetry from Florida State University. She lives in Tallahassee, Florida, and is a full professor of English and Humanities at Thomas University in Thomasville, Georgia.

== Honors and awards ==
- Vermont Book Award in Fiction, 2023
- Akron Poetry Prize, 2015
- Best American Poetry 2015
- Best American Poetry 2014
- Cleveland State University Poetry Center Open Competition Prize 2012

== Books ==
- Assia (Noemi Press, 2023) ISBN 9781934819920
- Triptychs (Wave Books, 2022) ISBN 1950268691
- Atopia (Wesleyan University Press, 2019) ISBN 0-8195-7904-1
- Orlando (Wave Books, 2018) ISBN 1-9406-9660-7
- Further Problems with Pleasure (University of Akron Press, 2017) ISBN 1-6292-2057-4
- Steal It Back (Saturnalia Books, 2015) ISBN 0-9915-4549-4
- The Sonnets (Bloof Books, 2014)
- Mother Was a Tragic Girl (Cleveland State University Poetry Center, 2012) ISBN 1-8808-3496-0
- Warsaw Bikini (Bloof Books, 2009) ISBN 0-6152-5623-6

== Criticism ==
- Moving From Elegy to Ecstasy, a Poet Pushes Against the Canon. Review of Roger Reeves, April, 2023.
- A Poet Whose Calling Is Doubt Celebrates Language’s Uncertainty. Review of Heather McHugh, June, 2020.
- In *Protest or Celebration, Four Poets Evoke a Sense of Endings. Review of Four Poets. May, 2020.
- Review of Ariana Reines's A Sand Book. Jan, 2020.
- Riot Girl: Chelsey Minnis’s Unladylike Poetry. April, 2019.
