= Samuel Totten =

American historian

Samuel Totten is an American professor of history noted for his scholarship on genocide. Totten was a distinguished professor at the University of Arkansas, Fayetteville where he taught from 1987 to 2012 and served as the chief editor of the journal Genocide Studies and Prevention. He is a Member of the Council of the Institute on the Holocaust and Genocide, Jerusalem.

== Early life and education ==
Totten was raised in Laguna Beach, California. He earned a B.A. in English from California State University, Long Beach. Following a master's degree in English from California State University, Sacramento, Totten earned another master's degree (1982) and his doctorate (1985) from Teachers College, Columbia University.

== Career ==
Totten took a faculty position with the College of Education and Health Professions at the University of Arkansas in 1987 and taught there until retiring from teaching in 2012. He served as an investigator on the U.S. State Department's Darfur Atrocities Documentation Project (2004). In 2005 he became one of the chief co-editors of Genocide Studies and Prevention, the official journal of the International Association of Genocide Scholars (IAGS). He received a Fulbright Scholarship at the Centre for Conflict Management, National University of Rwanda. Between 2004 and 2011, he conducted research along the Chad/Darfur, Sudan border into the genocide perpetrated by the Government of Sudan in Darfur. He conducted research into the genocidal actions of the Government of Sudan in the Nuba Mountains that began in the late 1980s to mid-1990s, and continued through his work in 2012. During the 2009-2010 academic year Totten served as the Ida King Distinguished Visiting Professor of Holocaust and Education at The Richard Stockton College of New Jersey.

== Awards ==
- Giraffe Hero Award, 2016.
- Distinguished Alumni Award, Teachers College, Columbia University, 2011.
- Faculty Career Award, College of Education and Health Professions, University of Arkansas, 2011
- Arkansas Peace & Justice Heroes Award. Awarded by the OMNI Center for Peace, Justice and Ecology, Fayetteville, Arkansas, 2007.

== Personal life ==
Totten is married to Professor of Nursing Kathleen Barta.

== Publications ==
- Totten, Samuel, and Parsons, William S. (Eds.) (2022). Centuries of Genocide: Critical Essays and Eyewitness Testimony. Fifth Edition. New York: Routledge (732 pages).
- Totten, Samuel, and Parsons, William S. (Eds.) (2012). Centuries of Genocide: Critical Essays and Eyewitness Testimony. Fourth Edition. New York: Routledge (616 pages).
- Totten, Samuel (2012). Genocide by Attrition: The Nuba Mountains in the Sudan. New Brunswick, NJ: Transaction Publishers.
- Totten, Samuel, and Ubaldo, Rafiki (2011). We Cannot Forget: Interviews with Survivors of the Genocide in Rwanda. New Brunswick, NJ: Rutgers University Press.
- Totten, Samuel (2010). An Oral and Documentary History of the Darfur Genocide. Santa Barbara, CA: Praeger Security International.
- Totten, S. and Parsons, William (Eds.) (2009). Century of Genocide: Critical Essays and Eyewitness Testimony. Third Edition. New York: Routledge (672 pages).
- Totten, S. & Markusen, E. (Eds.) (2006). Genocide in Darfur: Investigating Atrocities in the Sudan. New York: Routledge.
- Totten S. (2006). The Prevention and Intervention of Genocide: An Annotated Bibliography. New York: Routledge.
- Totten, S. (Ed.) (2005). Genocide at the Millennium. New Brunswick, NJ: Transaction Publishers.
- Totten, S., Parsons, W.S., & Charny, I.W. (Eds.) (2004). Century of Genocide: Critical Essays and Eyewitness Testimony. Second Edition. New York: Routledge
- Totten, S. (Ed.) (2004). Teaching About Genocide. Greenwich, CT: Information Age.
- Totten, S. & Jacobs, S. (Eds.) (2002). Pioneers of Genocide Studies. New Brunswick, NJ: Transaction Publishers.
- Charny, I.W. (Chief Editor), Adalian, R., Jacobs, S., Markusen, E. & Totten, S. (Associate Editors) (1999). Encyclopedia of Genocide. Santa Barbara, CA: ABC CLIO Press.
- Totten, S., Parsons, W.S. & Charny, I.W. (Eds.) (1997). Century of Genocide: Eyewitness Accounts and Critical Views. New York: Garland Publishing, Inc. (532 pages) Expanded, paperback version of Genocide in the Twentieth Century.
- Totten, S., Parsons, W.S. & Charny, I.W. (Eds.) (1995). Genocide in the Twentieth Century: Critical Essays and Eyewitness Testimony. New York: Garland Publishing, Inc.
- Totten, S. (1991). First Person Accounts of Genocidal Acts Committed in the Twentieth Century: A Critical Annotated Bibliography. Westport, CT: Greenwood Press.
- Totten, S., Hitchcock, R. (Ed.). (2011). Genocide of Indigenous Peoples: A Critical Bibliographic Review (1st ed.). Routledge. https://doi.org/10.4324/9780203790830
