= Carrie Oeding =

American poet (born 1978)

Carrie Oeding (born 1978) is an American poet.

== Life ==
She was born and raised in Luverne, in southwestern Minnesota. She earned an MFA in Creative Writing from Eastern Washington University and a PhD in Creative Writing from Ohio University. She has taught at Ohio University, University of Houston, and is currently teaching at Bridgewater State University in East Bridgewater, Massachusetts.

Oeding's first poetry collection, Our List of Solutions (2011), won the Lester M. Wolfson Prize. Her work features in the anthologies Best New Poets 2005 and Privacy Policy: The Anthology of Surveillance Poetics (2014). In 2021, Akron University chose her book "If I Could Give You a Line" as their 2021 Akron Poetry Prize winner. Her work has also appeared in Colorado Review, Laurel Review and Greensboro Review, and has been featured in PBS NewsHour and Verse Daily.

== Publications ==
- If I Could Give You at Line (2023). Akron, OH: University of Akron Press. ISBN 978-1629222417
- Our List of Solutions (2011). South Bend, IN: 42 Miles Press. ISBN 978-0983074717
