= Virginia Commonwealth University School of the Arts in Qatar =

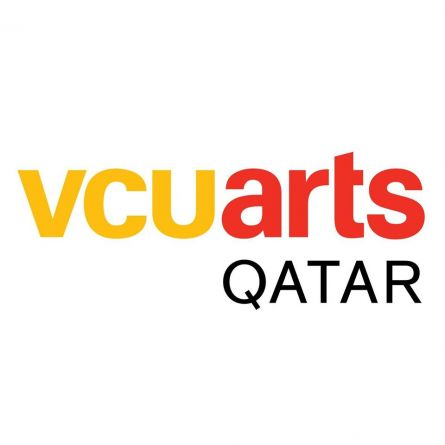
- Motto: Eam Realem (Latin)
- Type: Private
- Established: 1998; 28 years ago
- Parent institution: Virginia Commonwealth University
- Endowment: $2.72 billion (2021)
- President: Michael Rao
- Dean: Amir Berbić
- Faculty: 82
- Administrative staff: 73
- Undergraduates: 300
- Location: Doha, Qatar; 25°18′53.24″N 51°25′58.69″E
- Campus: Urban
- Colors: Black and gold
- Nickname: Rams
- Mascot: Rodney the Ram
- Website: qatar.vcu.edu

The Virginia Commonwealth University School of the Arts in Qatar (VCUarts Qatar) is the Qatari Education City campus of the School of the Arts of Virginia Commonwealth University, a public university in Richmond, Virginia, United States. VCUarts Qatar is accredited by the United States National Association of Schools of Art and Design, the Southern Association of Colleges and Schools, and the Council for Interior Design Accreditation.

== History ==
VCUarts Qatar was the first campus established in Education City in 1998. It has since been joined by Georgetown University School of Foreign Service, Weill Cornell Medical College, Texas A&M, Carnegie Mellon University, Northwestern University, HEC Paris, and University College London.

== Funding ==
VCUarts Qatar is funded by Qatar Foundation for Education, Science, and Community Development, a semi-private non-profit organization founded by then-emir Sheikh Hamad bin Khalifa Al Thani and his second wife and mother of current emir, Moza bint Nasser.

Aside from funding of the campus in Qatar and the management fee that the university receives as profit, universities who agree to open branches in Qatar are often the recipients of endowed chairs at the U.S. campuses.

In 2014, the estimated budget of VCUarts Qatar provided to VCU by Qatar Foundation was nearly $42 million. On top of that, undergraduate tuition was almost $25,000.

== Degrees offered ==
VCUarts Qatar offers Bachelor of Fine Arts degrees in graphic design, interior design, kinetic imaging, and painting & printmaking, a Bachelor of Arts degree in art history, and a Master of Fine Arts degree in design.

The university also offers a minor in Islamic art history and a joint minor with Northwestern University in Qatar in film and design.

Transcripts from VCUarts Qatar indicate that the courses were completed in Qatar, but the diploma is issued by VCU in Richmond, Virginia.

== Student life ==
VCUarts Qatar has over 300 undergraduate students representing 32 nationalities and over 1,000 alumni representing 55 different nationalities.

The university was originally opened for women, but in 2008 began also accepting men.

As part of the Education City ecosystem, VCUarts Qatar students are able to cross-register for courses at other universities within Education City. These include Georgetown University in Qatar, Weill Cornell Medicine – Qatar, Texas A&M University at Qatar, Carnegie Mellon University in Qatar, and Northwestern University in Qatar. Conversely, students from other Education City universities are able to cross-register for courses at VCUarts Qatar.

== Research ==
VCUarts Qatar established the Institute for Creative Research in 2022 to foster research amongst its faculty, students, and alumni. It is the first institute in Qatar and the Southwest Asia and North Africa (SWANA) region dedicated to advancing discourse across creative domains.

The university participated in London Design Biennale 2025 through its '‘Matter Diplopia - ازدواجية المواد’ pavilion that explored materiality, cultural constructs and societal impact in Qatar.

== Partnerships ==
VCUarts Qatar has partnerships and collaborations with industry and government organization across various sectors. These partners include Doha Design District, Arab Engineering Bureau, and Qatar Museums.

== Facilities ==
The main entrance of VCUarts Qatar. This is part of the new building, which was completed in 2010.

In 2010, a major expansion project allowed VCUarts Qatar to more than double its facilities, integrating its undergraduate and graduate programs under one roof. The expansion also extended the technical spaces to include a media lab, digital fabrication lab, printmaking studios, a photography studio, an expanded library and the region's first materials library.

== Leadership ==
The school is advised by a Joint Advisory Board, which per the agreement with Qatar Foundation must be composed of three members appointed by each VCU and Qatar Foundation and three independent members which are jointly appointed by VCU and Qatar Foundation.
