= Philip Metres =

American writer (born 1970)

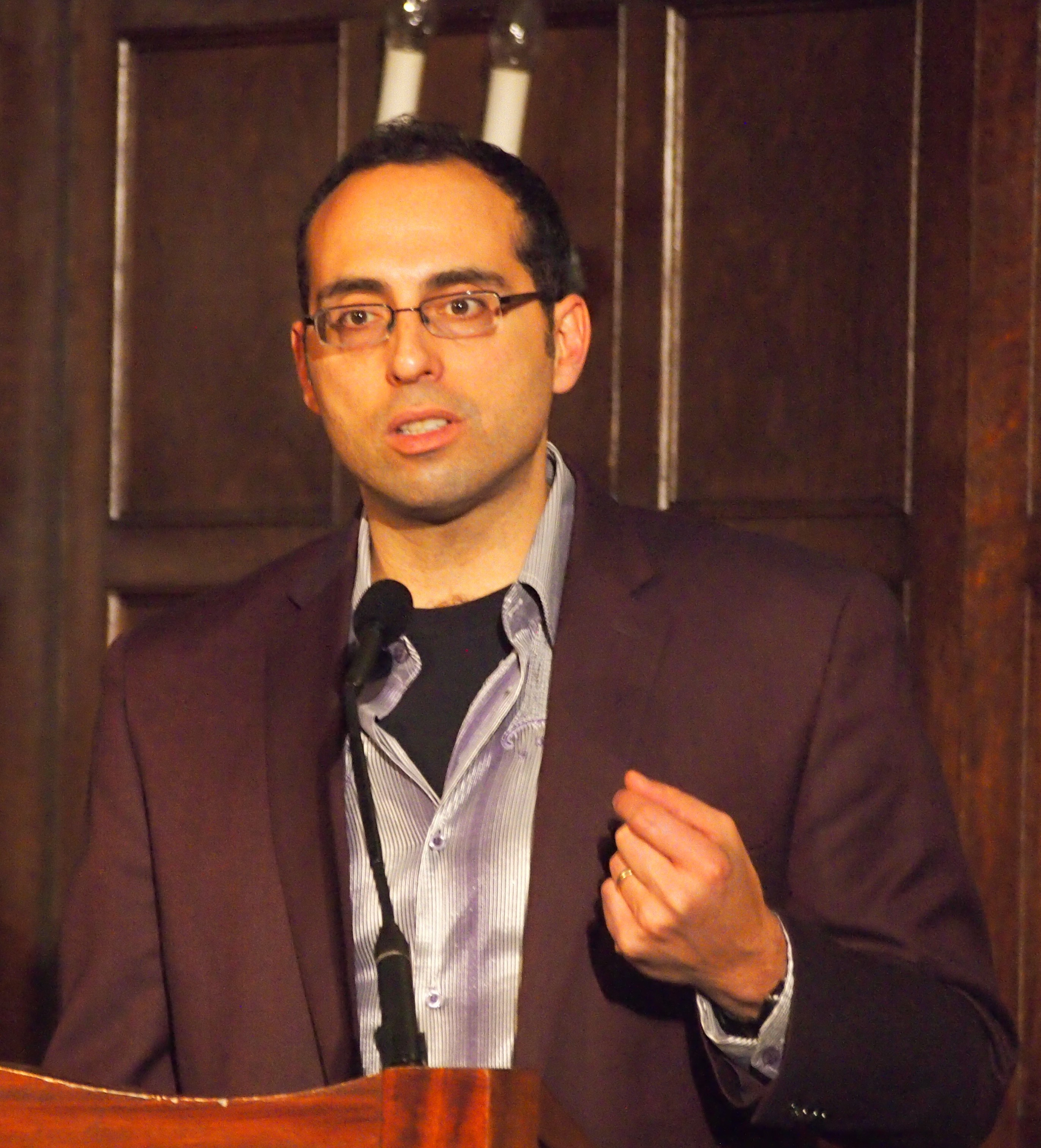
- Metres in 2016
- Born: July 4, 1970 (age 56); San Diego, California, U.S.
- Education: College of the Holy Cross (BA); Indiana University Bloomington (MA, MFA, PhD)
- Spouse: Amy Breau
- Writing career
- Genre: Poetry

Philip Metres (born July 4, 1970) is an American writer, poet, translator, scholar, and essayist.

His poetry books include Fugitive/Refuge, Shrapnel Maps, Pictures at an Exhibition, and Sand Opera. He has published poems, essays, and reviews in literary journals and magazines including Poetry, American Poetry Review, New England Review, Tin House, Ploughshares, New American Writing, Massachusetts Review, and others. His work has been anthologized in Best American Poetry; The New American Poetry of Engagement; With Our Eyes Wide Open: Poems of the New American Century; A Face to Meet the Faces: An Anthology of Contemporary Persona Poetry (2011); I Go to the Ruined Place: Contemporary Poems in Defense of Global Human Rights (2009); and Inclined to Speak: Contemporary Arab American Poetry (2008).

== Biography ==
Metres was born on July 4, 1970, in San Diego and grew up in Chicago. He graduated from the College of the Holy Cross in Worcester, Massachusetts, with a Bachelor of Arts, magna cum laude, in English literature. He then earned an M.A. in English, an M.F.A. in poetry, and his Ph.D. in English literature from Indiana University at Bloomington.

He is currently a professor of English and Director of the Peace, Justice, and Human Rights program at John Carroll University and is core faculty at the Vermont College of Fine Arts M.F.A. program.

In 2019, Metres was a faculty member at the 2019 Conference on Poetry at The Frost Place. He teaches issues related to nonviolent resistance and peacebuilding in the United States, Middle East, and Northern Ireland. Of Lebanese descent on his father's side, Metres plays a role in the Arab-American literary scene. Metres currently resides in Cleveland, Ohio with his wife, the writer Amy Breau, and their two daughters. His family of origin includes psychologists Kay Dannemann Metres (mother) and Phil Metres Jr. (father), entrepreneur Katherine Metres (sister), and attorney David Metres (brother).

== Honors ==
Metres' honors include a Guggenheim Fellowship, Lannan Literary Fellowship, two National Endowment for the Arts Fellowships, three Arab American Book Awards in poetry, the William Carlos Williams Award, a Pushcart Prize, the George W. Hunt, S.J., Prize, a Creative Workforce Fellowship, eight Ohio Arts Council Individual Excellence Awards, the Beatrice Hawley Award, the Adrienne Rich Award for Poetry (2019), the Lyric Poetry Prize (2016), the Anne Halley Prize for best poem by Massachusetts Review (2012), the Cleveland Arts Prize (Emerging Artist) (2010), Jury Prize for To See the Earth (Lit's Literary Showcase, 2008), Twin Cranes Peace Poem Prize; "For the Fifty Who Formed PEACE with Their Bodies," and a National Endowment of the Arts fellowship (2001).

His first book, Behind the Lines, received the International PeaceWriting Award. During his Thomas J. Watson Fellowship (1992–93), he began to translate contemporary Russian poetry, and he has since published numerous translations of the poetry of Sergey Gandlevsky, Lev Rubinstein, and Arseny Tarkovsky.

== Published works ==
=== Full-Length Poetry Collections (Original Poems and Translations) ===
- Fugitive/Refuge. Copper Canyon Press, 2024.
- Ochre & Rust: New Selected Poems of Sergey Gandlevsky. Green Linden. 2023.
- Shrapnel Maps. Copper Canyon Press, 2020. ISBN 9781556595639
- Pictures at an Exhibition. Akron Poetry Series, 2016. ISBN 9781629220246, OCLC 915496761
- Sand Opera. Alice James Books, 2015. ISBN 9781938584091, OCLC 879370638
- I Burned at the Feast: Selected Poems of Arseny Tarkovsky. Cleveland State University Poetry Center, 2015. ISBN 9780996316705, OCLC 903473794
- Compleat Catalogue of Comedic Novelties: Poems by Lev Rubinstein. Translation by Philip Metres and Tatiana Tulchinsky. Ugly Duckling Press, 2014.
- To See the Earth. Cleveland State University Poetry Center, 2008. ISBN 9781880834817, OCLC 183926612
- Catalogue of Comedic Novelties: Selected Poems of Lev Rubinstein. Translation by Philip Metres and Tatiana Tulchinsky. New York: Ugly Duckling Presse, 2004. ISBN 9780972768443, OCLC 56018819
- A Kindred Orphanhood: Selected Poems of Sergey Gandlevsky. Translation by Philip Metres. Boston, MA: Zephyr Press, 2003. ISBN 9780939010752, OCLC 54022686

=== Criticism ===
- The Sound of Listening: Poetry as Refuge and Resistance. Essays on Poetry. Ann Arbor, MI: University of Michigan Press. 2018. ISBN 978-0472037285
- "Beyond Grief and Grievance: The poetry of 9/11 and its aftermath." Poetry Foundation website.
- "Poems for Peace." Poetry Foundation website.
- "By Ambush and Stratagem: Poems of War and Peace in the Age of Pure War." Oxford Handbook of Modern and Contemporary Poetry. Ed. Cary Nelson. New York: Oxford UP, 2011.
- "From Reznikoff to Public Enemy." Poetry Foundation website.
- Behind the Lines: War Resistance Poetry on the American Homefront Since 1941. Poetry Criticism and Social History. Iowa City: University of Iowa Press, 2007. ISBN 9780877459989, OCLC 470679294

=== Poetry Chapbooks ===
- Returning to Jaffa. Doha, Qatar: Diode Editions, 2019.
- A Concordance of Leaves. Doha, Qatar: Diode Editions, 2013. ISBN 9781939728012, OCLC 852795874 Winner of 2014 Arab American Book Award.
- abu ghraib arias. Denver, CO: Flying Guillotine Press, 2011. ISBN 9781467532990, OCLC 809202989 Winner of 2012 Arab American Book Award.
- Thirty-Five New Pages. Translation. Lev Rubinstein. New York: Ugly Duckling Presse, 2011. OCLC 772000786
- Ode to Oil. Cleveland Heights, OH: Kattywompus Press, 2011. ISBN 9781936715015, OCLC 719239864
- Instants. New York: Ugly Duckling Presse, 2006
- Primer for Non-Native Speakers. Kent, OH: Wick Poetry Series, 2004.

=== Anthologies Edited ===
- Come Together: Imagine Peace: An Anthology of Peace Poems. Introduction by Philip Metres. Ed. Philip Metres, Ann Smith, and Larry Smith. Huron, OH: Bottom Dog Press, 2008. ISBN 9781933964225, OCLC 276888361

=== In Anthology ===
- Ghost Fishing: An Eco-Justice Poetry Anthology. Ed. Melissa Tuckey. University of Georgia Press, 2008. ISBN 978-0820353159, OCLC 1004957170

== List of honors and awards ==
- William Carlos Williams Award for Fugitive/Refuge, 2025
- Pushcart Prize, 2024
- Stephen Mitchell Prize for translation, 2022
- Guggenheim Fellowship, Poetry, 2020
- Arab American Book Award, Non-Fiction, 2019
- Adrienne Rich Award for Poetry, 2019
- Ohio Arts Council Individual Excellence Award, Poetry, 2016
- Lyric Poetry Award, Poetry Society of America, 2016
- Lannan Literary Fellowship, 2015.
- George W. Hunt, S.J., Prize, 2015
- PEN/Heim Translation Fund Grant, 2014
- Creative Workforce Fellowship, 2014
- Ohio Arts Council Individual Excellence Award, Poetry, 2014
- National Endowment for the Arts Fellowship, 2013
- Ohio Arts Council Individual Excellence Award, Poetry, 2012
- Ohio Arts Council Individual Excellence Award, Criticism, 2012
- Massachusetts Review Anne Halley Prize for Best Poem, 2012
- Cleveland Arts Prize, Emerging Artist Award, 2010
- Ohio Arts Council Individual Excellence Award Grant, Criticism, 2009
- To See the Earth, Jury Prize for the Lit's Literary Showcase, September 2008
- "For the Fifty Who Formed PEACE With Their Bodies," First Place, Twin Cranes Peace Poem contest, 2004
- "The Doors of Vereshchagin," First Place, New Words/Akron Art Museum contest, 2004
- Ohio Arts Council Individual Excellence Award, Poetry, 2004
- Behind the Lines, International PeaceWriting Award 2002
- "Ashberries," The Best American Poetry, 2002
- National Endowment of the Arts Individual Artist Fellowship, 2001
- Ross Lockridge Jr. Award for Creative Writing, Indiana University, 2001
- Guy Lemmon Prize for Professional Writing, Indiana University, 2000
- QALAM (Arab-American Literature) Contest, First Prize, Poetry, 1999
- Thomas J. Watson Fellowship, 1992-3
