= University of Akron Press =

American university press

- Parent company: University of Akron
- Founded: 1988
- Country of origin: United States
- Headquarters location: Akron, Ohio
- Distribution: Baker & Taylor Publisher Services
- Publication types: Books
- Official website: www.uakron.edu/uapress/

The University of Akron Press is a nonprofit university press that is a part of The University of Akron. Founded in 1988, the Press is currently directed by Jon Miller and is a member of Association of University Presses.

The University of Akron Press publishes scholarly, academic, regional and literary titles in several series, including: Ohio History and Culture; Akron Series in Poetry; Contemporary Poetics; The Center for the History of Psychology Series; The Bliss Institute Series; The NCCAkron Series in Dance.

The Press also distributes the works of psychologist Jacob Robert Kantor (1888–1984) under the imprint Principia Press.

Each year, the Press offers the Akron Poetry Prize, a competition open to all poets writing in English. The winning manuscript is published in the Akron Series in Poetry. The current Series Editor of the Akron Series in Poetry is Mary Biddinger.

== See also ==
- List of English-language book publishing companies
- List of university presses
