= October 1979 =

Month of 1979

<<	October 1979					>>
Su	Mo	Tu	We	Th	Fr	Sa
	1	2	3	4	5	6
7	8	9	10	11	12	13
14	15	16	17	18	19	20
21	22	23	24	25	26	27
28	29	30	31

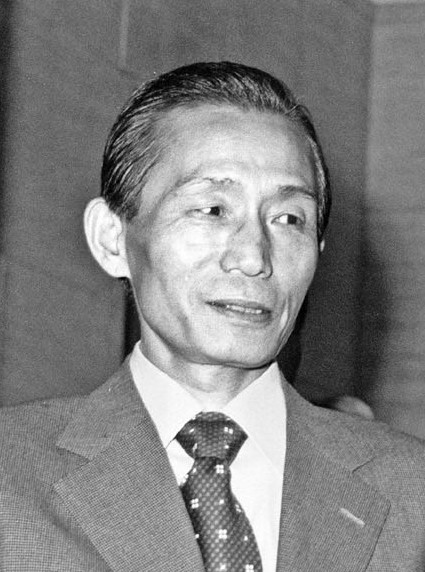
October 26, 1979: South Korean President Park Chung Hee assassinated

The following events occurred in October 1979:

== October 1, 1979 (Monday) ==
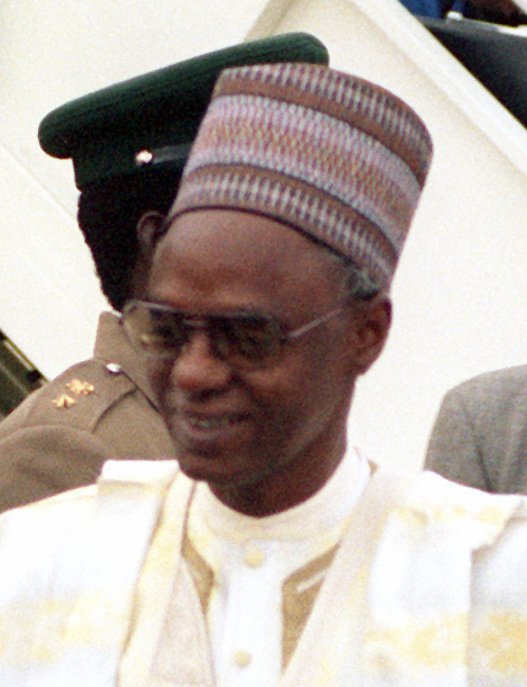
Nigeria's President Shagari

- Nigeria terminated military rule, and the Second Nigerian Republic was established, ending 13 years of military rule. Shehu Shagari, a former Finance Minister who had won a presidential election in 1978, succeeded Nigerian General Olusegun Obasanjo. After being sworn in, Shagari surprised observers by asking his political opponents to submit nominations for his Cabinet. On the same day, an "American-style" Senate and House of Representatives was inaugurated, and a federal system of governors for the African nation's 19 states took office.
- The Panama Canal Zone ceased to exist as a United States territory and reverted to control of the Republic of Panama after more than 75 years. From its creation on May 4, 1904, until its termination, the territory of 553 square miles (1,430 km^{2}) was part of the U.S.
- Pope John Paul II arrived in Boston, described by one reporter as the "keystone city of American Roman Catholicism" for his first visit to the United States as part of an eight-day tour of the U.S., and held a Mass at Boston Common before 100,000 worshipers.
- U.S. President Jimmy Carter announced in a televised speech that he would order a moderate response to the discovery of a presence of Soviet Union troops in Cuba, backing away from a previous statement that the presence of Red Army soldiers in the Western Hemisphere was unacceptable. "My fellow Americans," Carter said, "the greatest danger to American security tonight is certainly not the two or three thousand Soviet troops in Cuba. The greatest danger to all nations of the world... is the breakdown of a common effort to preserve the peace and the ultimate threat of nuclear war." Carter stated that the U.S. response would be to increase surveillance of Cuba, establish a "Caribbean Task Force" in Key West, Florida, and conduct a landing exercise of 1,500 U.S. Marines at the Guantanamo Bay Naval Base in Cuba that had been under a perpetual lease for decades.
- The MTR, the rapid transit railway system in Hong Kong, opened.
- The new United States Bankruptcy Code went to effect, superseding the first Code that had been created in 1898.
- Market Daily, the official economic newspaper of the People's Republic of China, published its first issue after having received approval from the Chinese Communist Party.
- James Eppolito, a gangster in the Gambino crime family, was murdered along with his son, shot and killed by Gambino enforcers Roy DeMeo and Anthony Gaggi with the approval of Gambino boss Paul Castellano. Gaggi was wounded and then arrested, while fleeing the scene, by an off-duty NYPD officer who had been alerted to the killings by a witness.
- Died:
  - Dorothy Arzner, 82, American film director from 1927 to 1943 and, at one time, the only female director in Hollywood
  - Nikolay Glazkov, 60, Soviet Russian poet
  - Alfred Leland Crabb, American historical novelist

== October 2, 1979 (Tuesday) ==
- The use of home video recorders to record television broadcasts was ruled lawful by U.S. District Judge Warren J. Ferguson in Los Angeles, who declared that the "such recording is permissible under the copyright acts of 1909 and 1976" and rejected a request by Universal Studios and Walt Disney Productions seeking to stop the Sony and RCA corporations from selling VCRs. Ferguson's ruling would be reversed by the 9th Circuit Court of Appeals, but reinstated by the U.S. Supreme Court in its ruling in Sony Corp. of America v. Universal City Studios, Inc. on January 17, 1984.

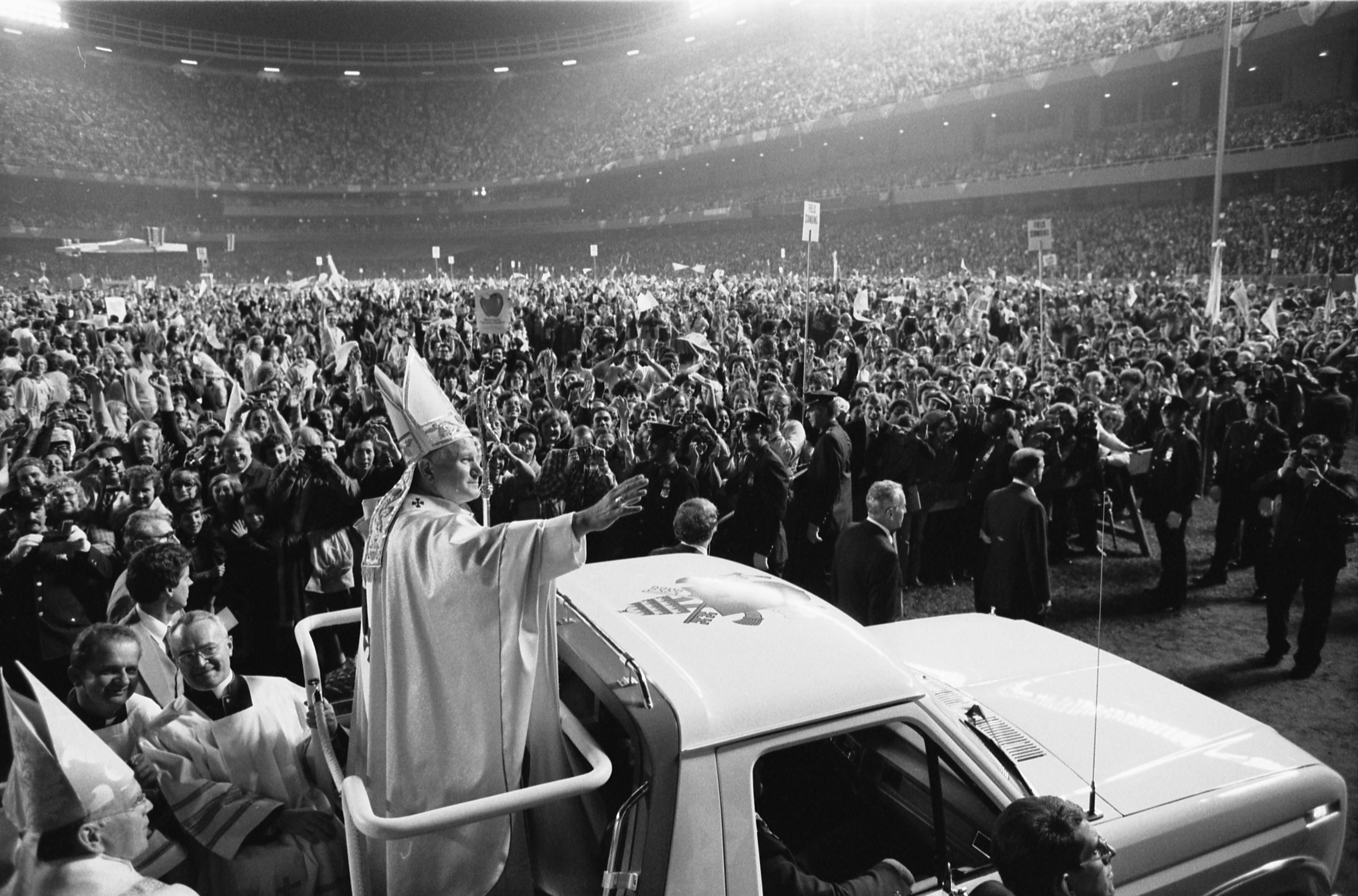
The Pope at Yankee Stadium

- Pope John Paul II addressed the United Nations General Assembly in New York City on human rights and spoke out against all forms of concentration camps and torture, then conducted mass at Yankee Stadium in front of 80,000 faithful.
- Died: Hannelore Schmatz, 39, West German mountaineer, and Ray Genet, 48, Swiss-born American mountaineer, both died of hypothermia after stopping to rest during their descent of Mount Everest. Their Nepalese guide, Sungdare Sherpa, who remained with Schmatz, lost most of his fingers and toes due to frostbite.

== October 3, 1979 (Wednesday) ==
- Dith Pran, whose experience during the aftermath of the Khmer Rouge takeover of Cambodia would be dramatized in the film The Killing Fields, was able to escape to Thailand and reunite with his colleague Sydney Schanberg, whom he served as a translator.
- Pope John Paul II concluded his tour of New York City with a Mass at Shea Stadium and at Madison Square Garden, then traveled to Philadelphia.
- The Cardenal Caro Province was created in central Chile from the southern portion of the San Antonio Province.
- A ban against serving alcohol in airplanes flying over the U.S. state of Kansas was reversed after six years by the state's Attorney General, Robert Stephan. The ban had been in place since 1973 based on an opinion by Stephan's predecessor, Vern Miller, that the sale of alcohol on flights taking off from or landing in the state of Kansas violated state liquor laws if the sale took place in Kansas airspace. The ban did not affect airliners flying over Kansas from one state to another. Stephan concluded that federal aviation laws pre-empted Kansas state regulation of navigable airspace.
- The National Stoolball Association was founded in the town of Haywards Heath, West Sussex England to oversee the game of stoolball a cricket-like sport.
- Born:
  - Josh Klinghoffer, American guitarist for the Red Hot Chili Peppers; in Santa Monica, California
  - Benji Hillman, English-born Israel Defense Forces officer who posthumously became the namesake of the Benji Hillman Foundation to aid "lone soldiers" immigrants to Israel who are serving their mandatory term in the Israeli Army; in London (killed 2006)

== October 4, 1979 (Thursday) ==
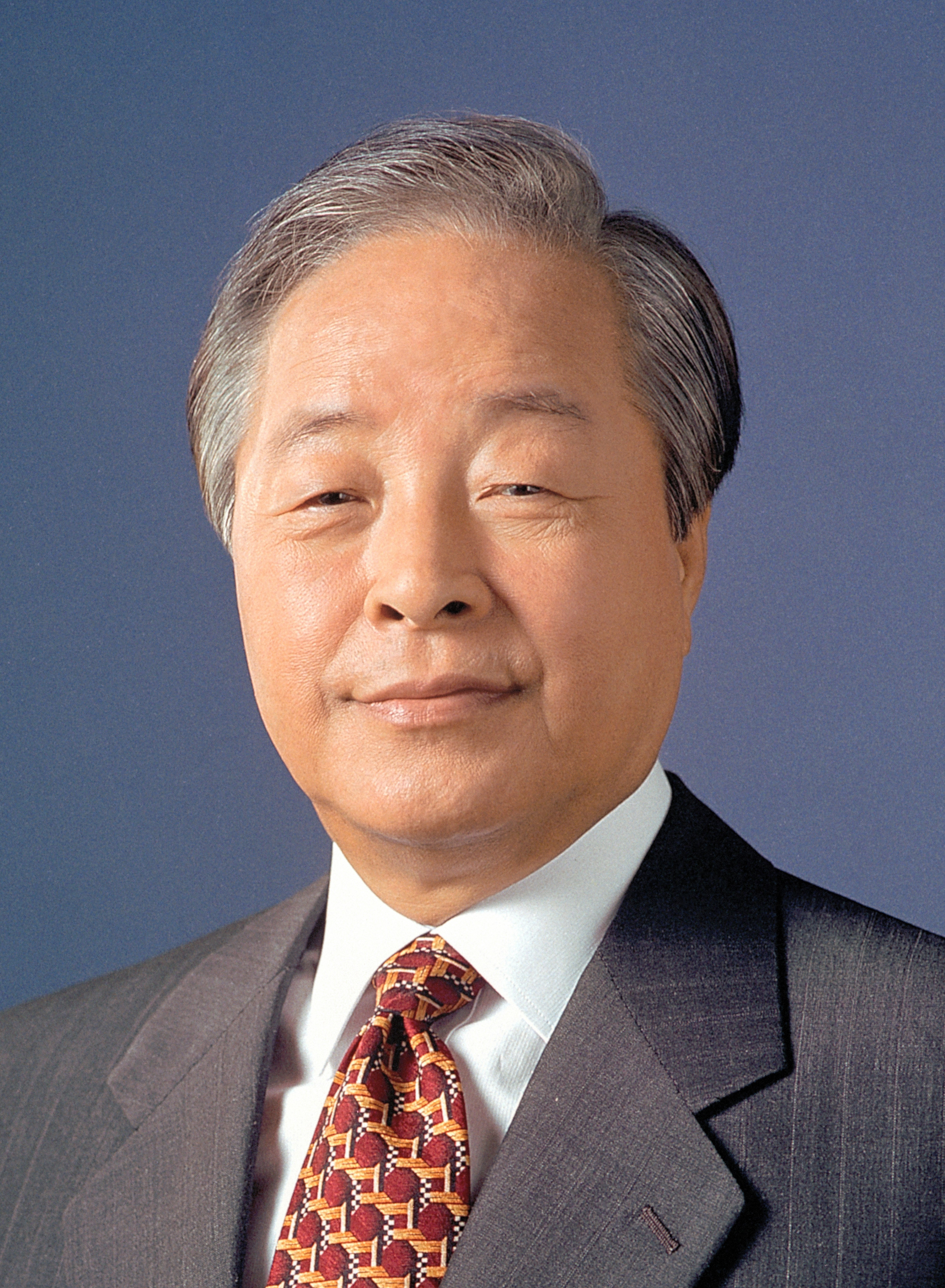
Kim Young-sam

- South Korea's National Assembly voted to expel Kim Young-sam, the leader of the New Democratic Party, the primary opposition to President Park Chung Hee's Democratic Republican Party, based on President Park's "Emergency Decree 9" of 1975, which made public criticism of the President a criminal offense. The 159 Democratic Republican Party members of the 233-seat National Assembly were the only legislators to participate in the vote, which was boycotted by other parties. Kim Young-sam would later serve as President of South Korea from 1993 to 1998.
- Pope John Paul II departed Philadelphia and traveled to Des Moines, Iowa. In Iowa, he held mass at St. Patrick's Church near the small town of Cumming, then at Living History Farms and at Buccaneer Arena in the Des Moines suburb of Urbandale, before traveling to Chicago.
- Born:
  - Caitríona Balfe, Irish TV and film actress; in Dublin
  - Adam Voges, Australian cricketer and batsman for the national team; in Subiaco, Western Australia

== October 5, 1979 (Friday) ==
- The Soviet Union and East Germany signed a 10-year mutual support treaty on the occasion of a meeting between the leaders of the Communist parties of their respective nations, as Erich Honecker hosted the visiting Soviet leader, Leonid Brezhnev. Brezhnev pledged to withdraw up to 20,000 of its 400,000 troops in East Germany over 12 months.
- Born: Gao Yuanyuan, Chinese actress and model; in Beijing
- Died: Charlie Smith, 100 to 105 years old, African-American centenarian who claimed to have been born in 1842 and to be 137 years old at the time of his death.

== October 6, 1979 (Saturday) ==
- The Federal Reserve System changed from an interest rate target policy to a money supply target policy. The announcement was made in a news conference by Fed Chairman Paul A. Volcker and came in conjunction with a statement that the Federal Reserve Board had voted, 7 to 0, to raise the "discount rate" (the interest rate for banks to borrow from the Fed) from 11% to a record-high of 12%. In addition, banks would be required to maintain a reserve of 8% on future borrowings from the Fed by requiring the banks to purchase certificates of deposit.
- The constitution of the Muscogee Nation (also known as the Creek Nation), located on the American Indian reservation in east central Oklahoma, was ratified by Muscogee tribal citizens in 12 Oklahoma counties, with a capital at Okmulgee, Oklahoma.
- Pope John Paul II was received as a guest of U.S. President Jimmy Carter at the White House on the last day of his first visit to the United States.
- Died:
  - Elizabeth Bishop, 68, American poet and short-story writer, Pulitzer Prize and National Book Award winner
  - Anastasios Orlandos, 91, Greek architect and historian
  - Konstantinos Papaioannou, 80, Greek physicist and mathematician

== October 7, 1979 (Sunday) ==
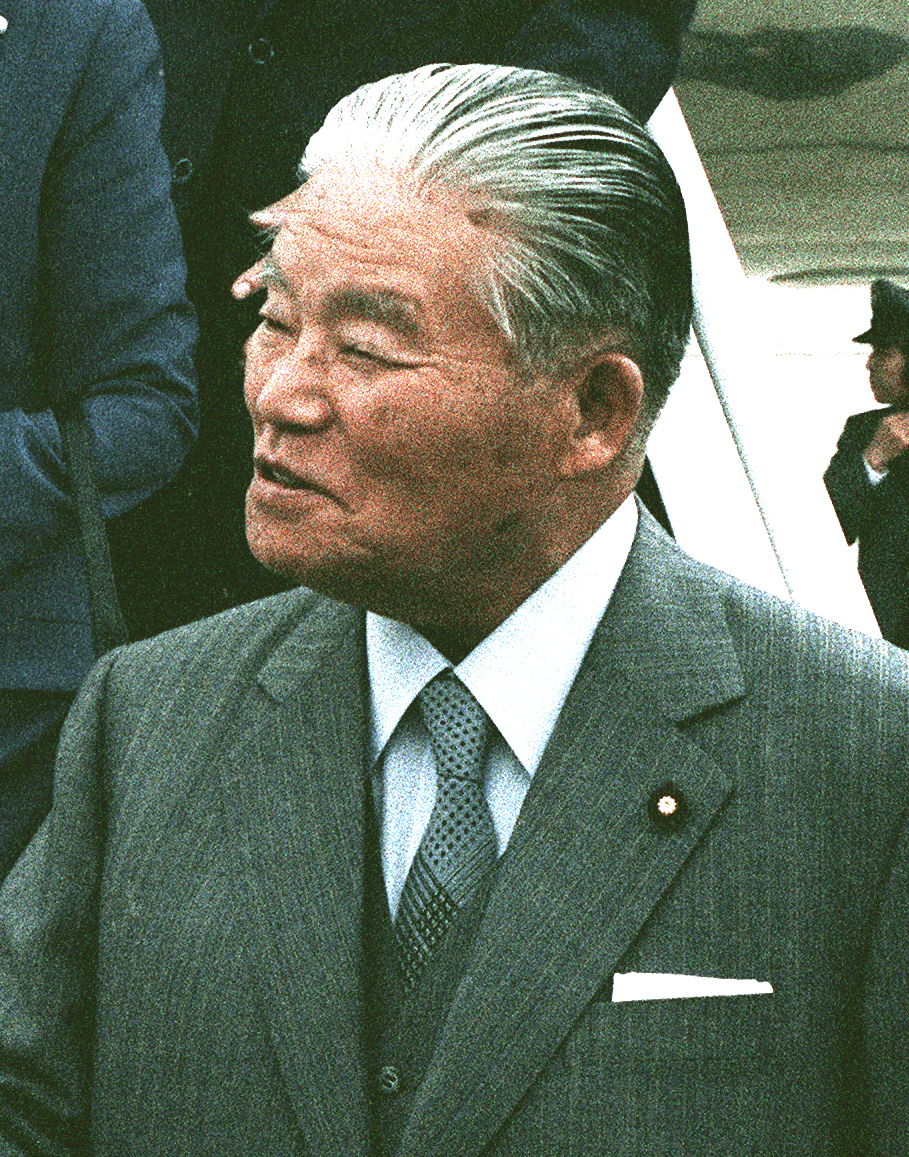
Premier Ohira

- Elections were held in Japan for the 511 seats of the Shūgiin, Japan's House of Representatives and lower house of its national parliament, the Kokkai. The Liberal Democratic Party of Prime Minister Masayoshi Ohira again failed to achieve a majority but maintained control after winning 248 seats
- A column of 64 soldiers and officers of Iran's Revolutionary Guards was "almost wiped out" by Kurdish rebels near Iran's border with Iraq, with 22 confirmed dead and the other 42 listed as missing in action. The incident was disclosed by the Guards Chief of Staff, Major General Hossein Shaker, in a radio interview.
- Swissair Flight 316 from Geneva caught fire after a hard landing at Athens, killing 14 of the 142 passengers on board when it overran the runway.

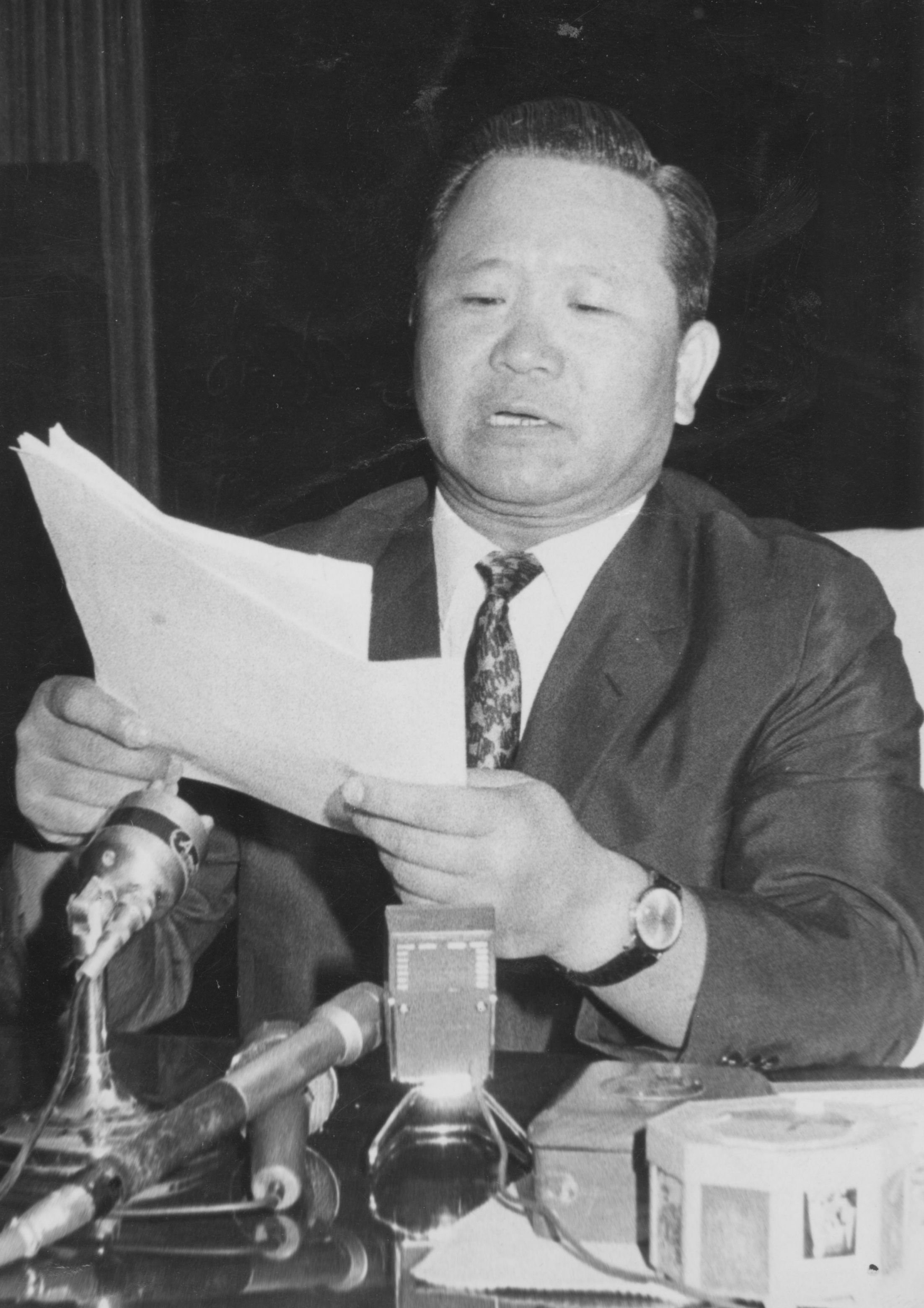
Former KCIA Director Kim

- Kim Hyong-uk, the former director of South Korea's Central Intelligence Agency (KCIA), disappeared in Paris after he refused to stop working on a book exposing the inner workings of the agency, which he directed from 1963 to 1969. Kim, 54 at the time that he vanished, was never seen in public again.
- Born:
  - Simona Amânar, Romanian gymnast and gold medalist in two Olympics; in Constanța
  - Shawn Ashmore, Canadian film and TV actor known for the X-Men film series, and his identical twin brother Aaron Ashmore, Canadian TV actor; in Richmond, British Columbia
  - Tang Wei, Chinese film actress; in Wenzhou, Zhejiang province

== October 8, 1979 (Monday) ==
- The popular Broadway musical revue Sugar Babies was performed for the first time, as film actor Mickey Rooney made a successful comeback in his Broadway theatre debut and co-starred with Ann Miller. The show would run for 1,208 performances at the Mark Hellinger Theatre and close on August 28, 1982.
- Comair Flight 444, a Piper Navajo, crashed shortly after takeoff from the Greater Cincinnati Airport near Covington, Kentucky, killing all eight people aboard. The twin-engine propeller plane was scheduled to fly to Nashville but lost power in one engine and plunged 200 feet (61 m) onto farmland.
- Died:
  - J. P. Narayan, 74, India revolutionary and independence activist
  - Nur Muhammad Taraki, 62, President of Afghanistan and General Secretary of the nation's Communist Party.

== October 9, 1979 (Tuesday) ==
- The Khmer People's National Liberation Armed Forces, with 2,000 guerrillas, was formed by Son Sann, a former prime minister of Cambodia, and General Dien Del, who had formerly served in the army of the pre-Communist Khmer Republic, in order to fight against the Vietnamese-installed People's Republic of Kampuchea.
- Born:
  - Brandon Routh, American film and TV actor known for portraying Superman in Superman Returns, and in a recurring role as The Atom on the TV series Arrow; in Des Moines, Iowa
  - Chris O'Dowd, Irish comedian and TV actor; in Boyle, County Roscommon

== October 10, 1979 (Wednesday) ==
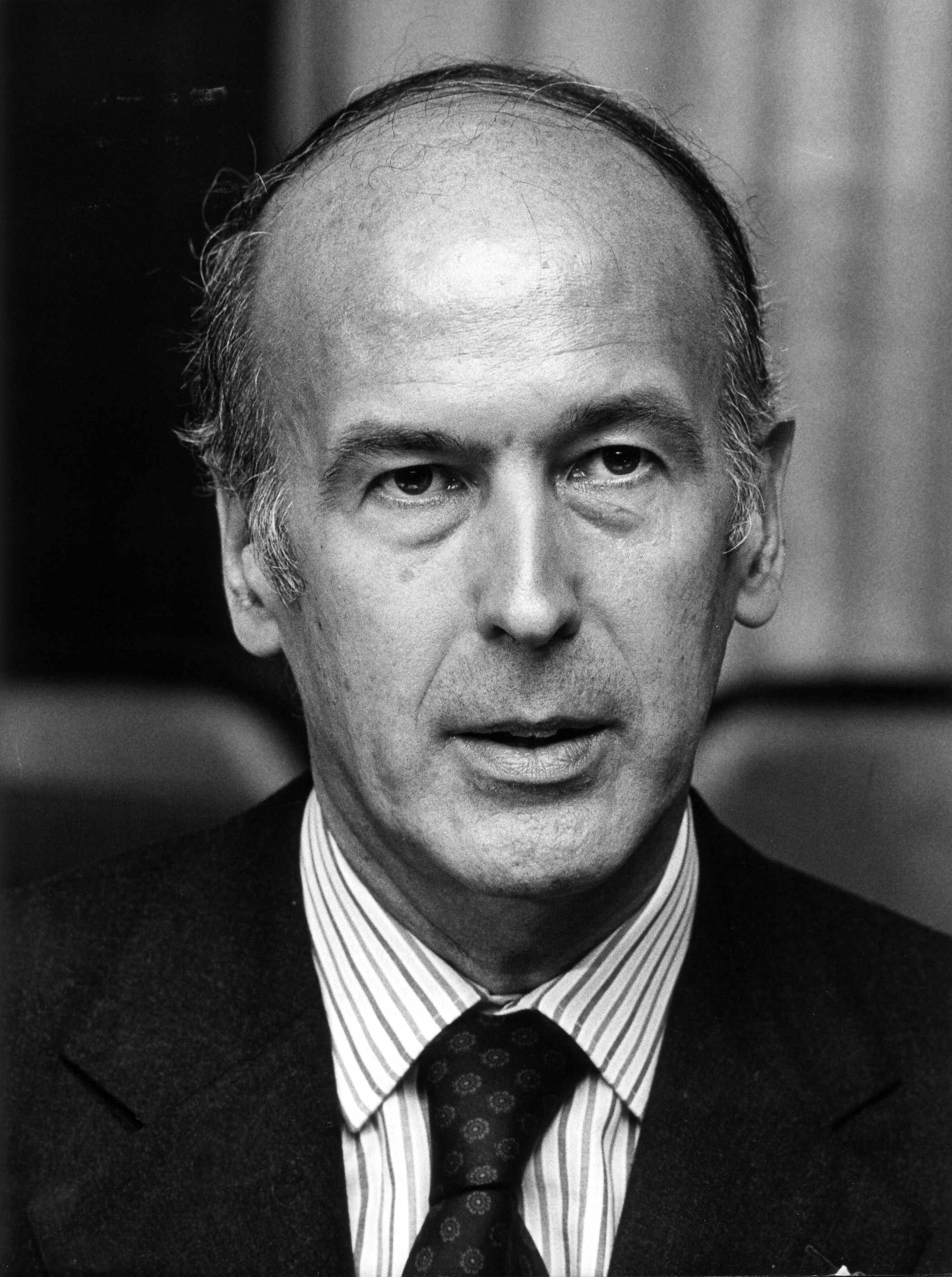
French President Giscard

- France's President Valéry Giscard d'Estaing, 18 months away from facing re-election to a second term, was implicated in a political scandal with the publication of a report in the weekly newspaper Le Canard enchaîné. The newspaper revealed that in 1973, Giscard had accepted a bribe of 30 carats of diamonds, worth $250,000, from the dictator of the Central African Republic, Jean-Bédel Bokassa. The report was supported by a photostat of the 1973 order signed by Bokassa to deliver the diamonds to Giscard, who at the time was the Minister of Finance for President Georges Pompidou. Le Canard also accused Giscard of attempting to cover up the incident by the seizure of Bokassa's files seized by French paratroopers.
- The government of Indonesia freed 2,000 political prisoners who had been incarcerated since a failed coup d'état attempt 14 years earlier, allowing them to leave the "prison island" of Buru. A government spokesman said that it would release 4,000 other persons, still detained on Buru, by the end of the year. The prisoners were transferred to the island of Java and then released after an official ceremony in the city of Semarang.
- President Jaime Roldós Aguilera of Ecuador signed a decree limiting the length of the regular work week from 42 hours to 40 hours.
- The Olkiluoto Nuclear Power Plant began operations in Eurajoki, Satakunta, Finland.
- Born:
  - Mýa (stage name for Mya Marie Harrison), Grammy Award-winning American singer; in Washington, D.C.
  - Nicolás Massú, Chilean professional tennis player and Olympic gold medalist; in Viña del Mar
  - Wu Chun (stage name for Goh Kiat Chun), Bruneian actor and pop singer; in Bandar Seri Begawan

== October 11, 1979 (Thursday) ==
- The U.S. Senate voted, 81 to 15, to censure longtime incumbent Senator Herman Talmadge (D.-Georgia) for improper financial conduct for more than five years before he had been caught. The vote took place after an investigation by the Senate of allegations that he had diverted more than $43,000 of campaign funds to his personal use for reimbursement of expenses that he had never incurred. Talmadge, in his fourth six-year term in the Senate, was defeated for re-election in 1980.
- The Nobel Prize in Physiology or Medicine was awarded to British electronics engineer Godfrey Hounsfield and South African-born physicist Allan MacLeod Cormack of the United States for their invention (each independently of the other) of computed axial tomography, the basis for the CT scan. The award by the Nobel Assembly of the Karolinska Institute was described as "one of the most unusual in the 78-year history of the prizes" because neither Hounsfield or Cormack had "a doctoral degree in medicine or any field of science."
- Sclerocactus wrightiae, known as Wright's fishhook cactus, was added to the federal endangered species list.

== October 12, 1979 (Friday) ==
- Near Guam, Typhoon Tip, also known as Typhoon Warling became the most powerful tropical cyclone in recorded history as measured by the lowest barometric pressure ever noted, 870 millibars (hPa) (25.69 inches mercury or inHg). Tip was also the largest cyclone on record, with a diameter of 1,380 miles (2,220 km) at its greatest size, and its winds reached 190 miles per hour (310 km/h). It caused 99 deaths as it swept over Japan.

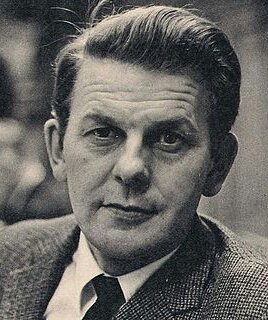
Sweden's PM Fälldin

- Thorbjörn Fälldin of the Centre Party became Prime Minister of Sweden for the second time, after forming a government from his coalition of three non-Socialist parties had won a 175 to 174 majority in the Riksdag on September 16. He replaced Ola Ullsten of the outgoing Liberal People's Party, who was named Minister of Foreign Affairs.
- The 1979–80 NBA season opened with a new rule adopting the three-point field goal for any scores made from more than 23 feet 9 inches (7.24 meters) from the center of the basket. Chris Ford of the Boston Celtics made the first NBA "three-pointer" in a game that also featured the professional debut of his teammate, Larry Bird.

- After 26 years of construction, Interstate 5 of the United States interstate highway system was completed with the opening of the final section of the 1,380 mi (2,220 km) long four-lane road that runs from the U.S. border with Canada to the U.S. border with Mexico. The final 4.6 mile span of highway, north of Stockton, California, was opened in ceremonies and described by California's Transportation Secretary Adriana Gianturco as "comparable to the driving of the golden spike in the Transcontinental Railway." Gianturco and the consuls of Canada and Mexico cut a gold-colored chain to signal the opening of I-5.
- Died: Katharine Burr Blodgett, 81, American physicist and chemist known for her invention of non-reflective "invisible" glass and the color gauge

== October 13, 1979 (Saturday) ==
- In the wake of the expulsion of Kim Young-sam from South Korea's National Assembly, all 66 members of Kim's New Democratic Party, and three members of the other opposition party, resigned in protest, marking the first time in the history of South Korea that all members of the opposition had resigned from the nation's parliament.
- Born: Mamadou Niang, Senegalese professional soccer football striker; in Matam
- Died: Archibald Roosevelt, 85, U.S. stockbroker, conservative activist and author, son of U.S. President Theodore Roosevelt, and founder of the Veritas Foundation.

== October 14, 1979 (Sunday) ==
- At least 75,000 people participated in the first National March on Washington for Lesbian and Gay Rights, held in Washington, D.C.
- Elections were held in Turkey for one-third of the seats of the Senate of the Republic, and five vacant seats in the 450 member House of Deputies. Prime Minister Bülent Ecevit's Republican People's Party lost all five of the Deputy elections and 38 of the 50 Senate elections.
- As many as 100,000 protesters in Bonn, the capital of West Germany, marched in protest of that nation's use of nuclear power.
- The Southern Africa Non-aggression Pact was signed by the presidents of Angola, Zaire and Zambia after Cuban troops had invaded Zaire from Angola.
- In Salt Lake City, Utah, Arthur Gary Bishop committed the first of five kidnappings and murders of young boys. He would be arrested in 1983 after his fifth murder and would be executed in 1988.
- Born: Stacy Keibler, American actress, dancer and professional wrestler for World Wrestling Entertainment; in Rosedale, Maryland

== October 15, 1979 (Monday) ==
- El Salvador's President Carlos Humberto Romero was overthrown in a bloodless coup d'état, prompting the beginning of the 12-year-long Salvadoran Civil War. Romero was replaced by a five-member junta chaired by Salvadoran Army Colonel Adolfo Arnoldo Majano and consisting of Majano, Colonel Jaime Abdul Gutiérrez, and three civilians
- U.S. intelligence officer George W. Cave met secretly with Iran's Foreign Minister Ebrahim Yazdi, and briefed him about Iraq's plans to go to war with Iran. The meeting was the last between U.S. and Iranian government officials prior to the seizure of the U.S. Embassy in Tehran 20 days later.
- "Black Monday", the sacking of a newspaper office by a political group, took place in the Mediterranean island nation of Malta.
- Born: Jaci Velasquez, bestselling American singer of Contemporary Christian music, 8-time winner of the GMA Dove Award; in Houston
- Died: U.S. Army General Jacob L. Devers, 92, U.S. military officer who oversaw the development of improved military weapons, including the M16 rifle, and the Sherman and Pershing tanks

== October 16, 1979 (Tuesday) ==
- A pair of tsunamis killed 23 people in the cities of Nice and Antibes after striking the French Riviera, with waves as high as 10 feet (3.0 m).
- Pakistan's President Muhammad Zia-ul-Haq canceled parliamentary elections scheduled for November 17, banned political parties and meetings, outlawed labor strikes and imposed censorship on all newspapers and magazines.
- Bülent Ecevit announced his resignation as Prime Minister of Turkey, along with the other cabinet ministers from his Republican People's Party (CHP) after the party's candidates lost most of the races in the elections two days earlier." Former Prime Minister Süleyman Demirel, whose Justice Party gained seats, formed a new government on November 12.
- Died: Johan Borgen, 77, Norwegian novelist

== October 17, 1979 (Wednesday) ==
- Major League Baseball's World Series was won by the Pittsburgh Pirates in Game 7 of the best 4-of-7 series, when the Pirates defeated the Baltimore Orioles, 4 to 1, in Baltimore. The Pirates had overcome a 3 games to 1 deficit by winning Games 5 and 6.
- U.S. President Jimmy Carter signed the Department of Education Organization Act into law, separating the United States Department of Education from the Department of Health, Education, and Welfare (HEW). The House of Representatives had approved the creation of the new cabinet-level department, 215 to 201, after the Senate had approved, 69 to 22. HEW was renamed the Department of Health and Human Services (HHS).

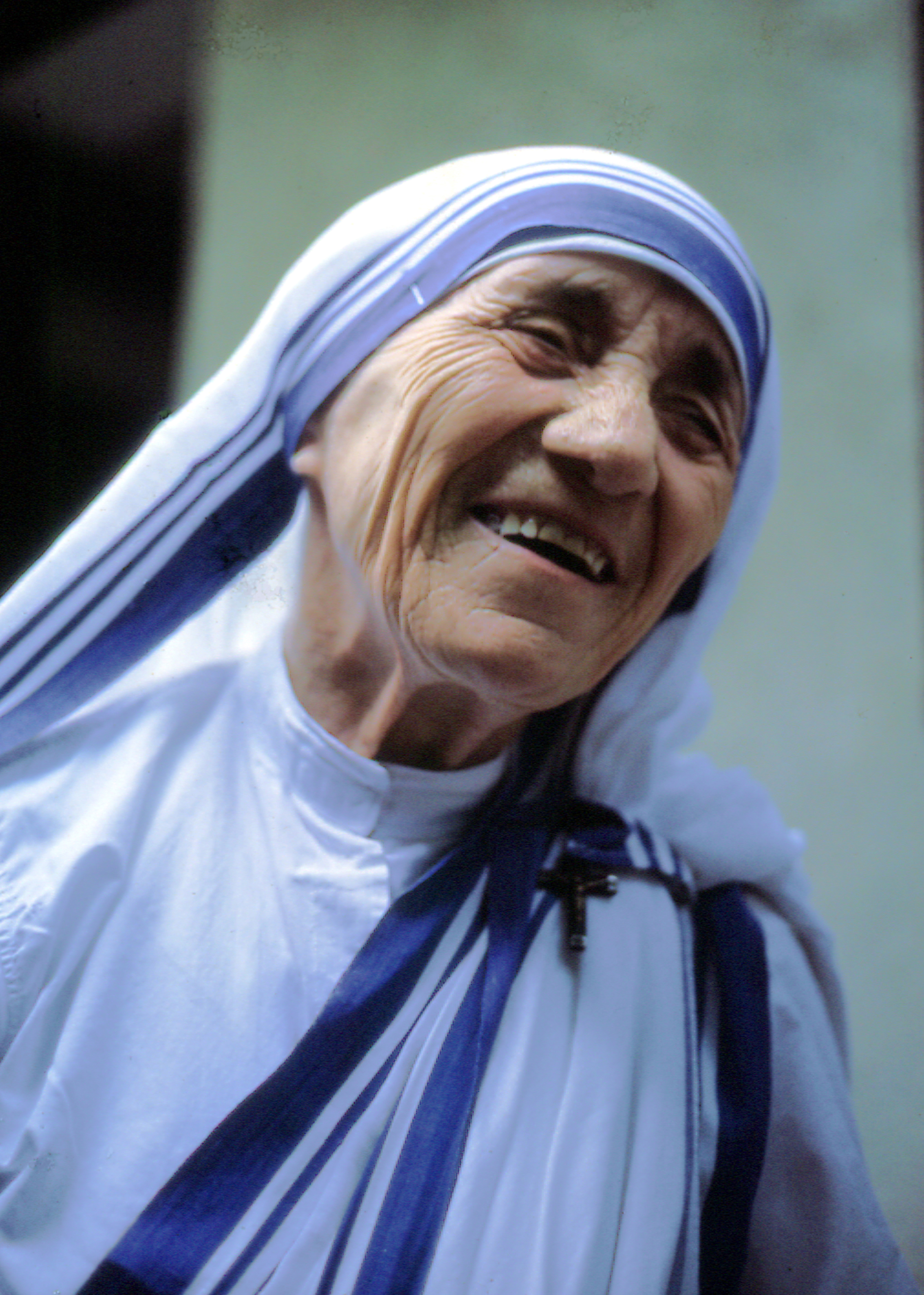
Mother Teresa

- Mother Teresa, an Albanian-born nun who cared for impoverished people in India, was awarded the Nobel Peace Prize. Upon learning of the award, she announced that she would use the prize money of 800,000 Swedish krona (equivalent at the time to USD $190,000) to build more homes in Calcutta. Mother Teresa would be posthumously canonized in 2016, making her the only Roman Catholic saint to have ever been awarded the Nobel Prize.
- Born: Kimi Räikkönen, Finnish race car driver nicknamed "The Iceman", winner of the 2007 Formula One World Championship; in Espoo
- Died:
  - S. J. Perelman, 75, American humorist and Academy Award-winning screenwriter
  - Lil Milagro Ramírez, 34, Salvadoran poet and rebel leader, was murdered in prison after having been captured in 1976 by El Salvador's Guardia Nacional state police.

== October 18, 1979 (Thursday) ==
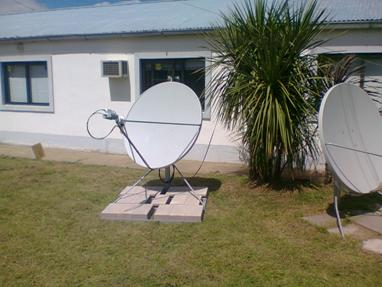
An early home satellite dish

- In the U.S., the Federal Communications Commission changed its rules to allow private individuals to own "satellite earth stations" (and receive transmissions relayed from geostationary orbiting satellites) without requiring a federal government license. The first parabolic antennas ("satellite dishes") for home use were 20 feet (6.1 m) in diameter.
- The McDonnell Douglas MD-80 made its first flight.
- The new leftist government of Nicaragua entered into diplomatic relations with the Soviet Union, with each opening diplomatic missions in the other's capital.
- Born: Ne-Yo (stage name for Shaffer C. Smith), bestselling American hip-hop music artist, three-time Grammy Award winner; in Camden, Arkansas
- Died: Virgilio Piñera, 67, Cuban playwright and dissident

== October 19, 1979 (Friday) ==
- A tripartite agreement on the Itaipu Dam was signed between representatives of Brazil, Paraguay and Argentina and established the allowed river levels and how much they could change as a result of the various hydroelectrical undertakings in the watershed that was shared by the three countries.
- A fire at the U.S. Marine Corps' Camp Fuji in Japan killed 13 servicemen after a 5,000 gallon storage tank of gasoline "inexplicably ruptured and ignited". The flames were spread quickly by winds from Typhoon Tip. Another 29 injured survivors were transferred to the burn center at the Brooke Army Medical Center in San Antonio, Texas.

== October 20, 1979 (Saturday) ==
- The John F. Kennedy Presidential Library and Museum was dedicated in Boston almost 16 years after President Kennedy's assassination.
- An urgent diplomatic cable was sent by the U.S. Department of State to Bruce Laingen, the chargé d'affaires of the U.S. Embassy in Iran and the acting ambassador to the Islamic Republic. Laingen was informed that U.S. President Carter and Secretary of State Cyrus Vance had decided to allow the Shah of Iran to enter the U.S. for emergency treatment for gallstones and cancer. Laingen met the next day with Iran's Prime Minister Mehdi Bazargan and Foreign Minister Ebrahim Yazdi, who gave assurances that the Iranian government would protect the U.S. Embassy but "expressed astonishment and misgivings over the American decision."
- John Tate of the United States defeated Gerrie Coetzee of South Africa to win the World Boxing Association (WBA) heavyweight boxing title that had been vacated by Muhammad Ali. Tate, a black American from Knoxville, Tennessee, outpointed Coetzee, a white South African in 15 rounds. The fight took place outdoors at Loftus Versfeld Stadium in Pretoria before a crowd of 81,000, the largest attendance at a boxing bout since the Dempsey and Tunney fight of 1927. Despite the apartheid laws of South Africa, racial segregation of the spectators was not allowed by agreement of the promoters of the bout.
- The first McDonald's in Singapore opened, with a restaurant at Liat Towers in Orchard Road.
- Parliamentary elections were held in the southern African nation of Botswana, with the Botswana Democratic Party of President Seretse Khama continuing its majority. The Reuters news agency noted that "No other party has put up enough candidates to form a majority in Parliament."
- Twenty-one people were killed and 32 injured in France when the bus they were traveling in was struck by a train near the city of Tarbes. The group from Spain had been on its way back to the city of Bilbao after making the pilgrimage to the Sanctuary of Our Lady of Lourdes when the bus became stuck on the railroad tracks.
- Born:
  - John Krasinski, American film director and TV actor; in Boston
  - Paul O'Connell, Irish rugby union player with 108 appearances for the Ireland National Team; in Limerick

== October 21, 1979 (Sunday) ==
- Elections were held in Switzerland for the 200 seats of the National Council and the 46 seats of the Council of States.
- Huber Matos, who had fought alongside Fidel Castro in 1959 but was imprisoned later in the year on charges of sedition, was released from prison after completing the entirety of his 20-year sentence. He was then allowed to leave and moved to Costa Rica, then to the United States.
- Norway's soccer football championship, the Norgesmesterskapet i fotball, was won in Oslo by Viking FK of Stavanger, which beat SK Haugar of Haugesund, 2 to 1.
- In an effort to minimize black market trading and to nullify the effect of bank notes taken by its former dictator and his followers, the government of Uganda announced that it would require the exchange of the African nation's currency (the Ugandan shilling) with newly minted shillings. Uganda closed its borders with its five neighbors, restricted entry and exit, and declared that after October 27, the old shillings (which bore the image of deposed president Idi Amin) would no longer be legal tender if not exchanged for new versions before the deadline. When Amin and other members of the old regime had fled in April, they had taken millions of old shilling notes with them, all of which were made worthless by the changeover.

== October 22, 1979 (Monday) ==
- U.S. President Jimmy Carter and the U.S. Department of State permitted the deposed Shah of Iran, Mohammad Reza Pahlavi, to enter the United States for treatment for suspected cancer at Cornell Medical Center in New York City. The Shah arrived at LaGuardia Airport at 10:00 p.m. after a flight from Mexico, a decision which would outrage Iran and prompt the seizure of the U.S. Embassy in Tehran and the taking of its employees as hostages.
- Died: Jesse Bishop, 46, became the first U.S. prison inmate to be put to death in the gas chamber in the U.S. since 1967, and only the third person to be legally executed in the U.S. since 1976. Bishop, who had shot and killed David Ballard in 1977 during the robbery of a Las Vegas casino, died at the Nevada State Prison in Carson City. Before being put to death, Bishop told detectives that he had committed 18 "murders for hire".

== October 23, 1979 (Tuesday) ==
- Elections took place in Denmark for the 179 seats in the Folketing, the nation's unicameral parliament. The results "produced no major change in the alignment of the nation's 12 parties,". The Socialdemokraterne party of Prime Minister Anker Jørgensen won 68 seats, 20 short of a majority, and retained control of the government.
- Thirty people were killed by a landslide that buried a "makeshift fishermen's camp" near Puerto Montt in Chile under thousands of tons of mud, after heavy rains had loosened a hillside.
- A trial court in Czechoslovakia convicted six human rights activists of "subversion of the republic", including playwright Václav Havel Freed in 1983, Havel would become President of Czechoslovakia at the end of 1989 with the fall of the Communist Party of Czechoslovakia and would later become the first President of the Czech Republic in 1992 when Slovakia and the Czech Republic became separate nations.
- The Chinese Society of Astronautics was founded in Beijing by aerospace engineers Qian Xuesen and Ren Xinmin, and General Zhang Zhenhuan.
- Born: Prabhas (stage name for Uppalapati Venkata Suryanarayana Prabhas Raju), Indian Telugu cinema film star; in Madras, Tamil Nadu state
- Died:
  - Nadia Boulanger, 92, French orchestra conductor and classical music composer
  - Antonio Caggiano, 90, Argentine Roman Catholic Cardinal believed to have facilitated the welcoming and resettlement of Nazi war criminals to Argentina

== October 24, 1979 (Wednesday) ==
- The long-running BBC sitcom Terry and June, starring the English comedy team of Terry Scott and June Whitfield as a husband and wife, Terry and June Medford, broadcast its first episode. The series, which would run until 1987, came after their sitcom Happy Ever After (in which they played a husband and wife, Terry and June Fletcher) had gone off the air on April 25 after five years.
- Died: Eleanor Robson Belmont, 99, English-born American actress and philanthropist

== October 25, 1979 (Thursday) ==
Catalonian flag

Basque flag

- Voters in the Spanish regions of Catalonia (provinces of Barcelona, Girona, Lleida, and Tarragona) and the Basque Country (provinces of Alava, Guipuzcoa and Vizcaya) overwhelmingly approved statutes that would allow them autonomy and limited self-government after more than 40 years of direct rule from Spain's central government. The vote in Catalonia was almost 92% for the statute of autonomy while the vote in the Basque region was almost 95% in favor.
- The Andean Parliament, with 25 members, was created to serve the five-nation trade bloc in South America, the Comunidad Andina (CAN) with the signing of a Constitutive Treaty at the capital of Bolivia, La Paz. Each of the member nations (Bolivia, Colombia, Ecuador, Peru and Venezuela) contributed five representatives who met initially in at the CAN headquarters in the capital of Peru, Lima.
- The People's Republic of China announced its return to participation in the Olympic Games for the first time since 1958. The Communist nation's Olympic committee agreed to renew its membership in the International Olympic Committee and plans to participate in the 1980 Winter Olympics.
- The Communist governments of the Soviet Union and of South Yemen signed a 20-year treaty of friendship that would become a moot point a little more than 12 years later when both nations ceased to exist. The Union of Soviet Socialist Republics would breakup at the end of 1991, while South Yemen, officially the "People's Democratic Republic of Yemen" and the only Communist nation in the Middle East, would cease to exist with the completion of its merger with the Yemen Arab Republic (North Yemen) in 1992.
- Vincent Teekah, the Minister of Education for the South American nation of Guyana was assassinated while his car was stopped at a traffic light in a suburb of Georgetown.
- Died:
  - Sir Gerald Templer, 81, British Army Field Marshal and former Chief of the Imperial General Staff
  - Maphevu Dlamini, 57, Prime Minister of Swaziland since 1976

== October 26, 1979 (Friday) ==
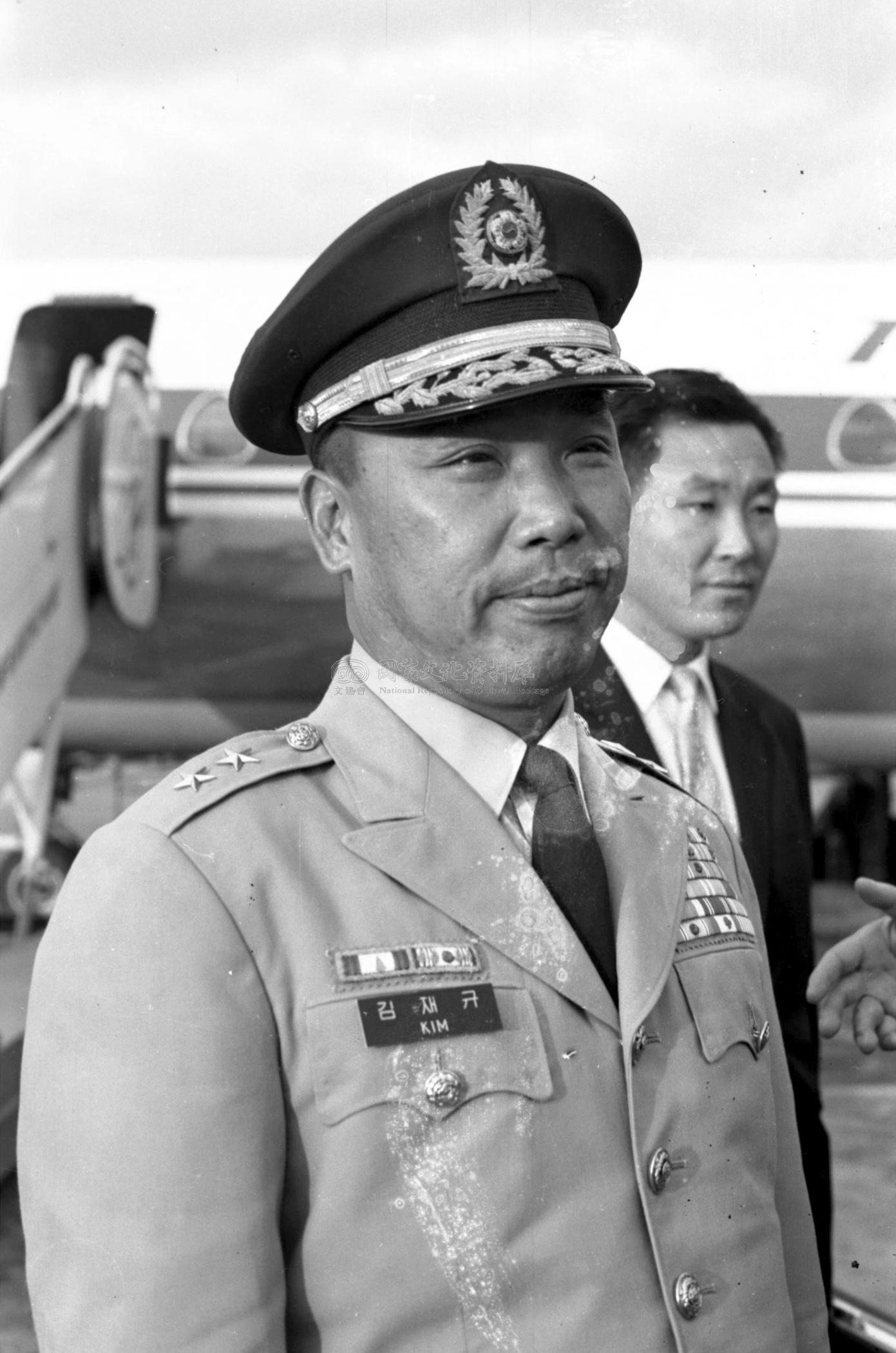
KCIA Director and assassin Kim Jae-gyu

- South Korea's President Park Chung Hee was assassinated at a dinner party by the Director of his Korean Central Intelligence Agency, Kim Jae-gyu. At 7:35 in the evening in Seoul, Kim Jae-gyu's first shot killed Park's bodyguard, Cha Chi-choi, because of Cha's reputation as "a superb marksman" and "a tough former paratrooper detested by a section of the military and by top men in the K.C.I.A." Park, who had been President of an oppressive government since 1961, was shot to death along with four of his bodyguards and his chauffeur during an argument that started after Park had berated Kim for being ineffective in suppressing student uprisings. In an emergency meeting three hours after the incident, the Cabinet of Ministers named Prime Minister Choi Kyu Hah as the acting president and imposed martial law over most of the nation and closed all airports under its jurisdiction.

== October 27, 1979 (Saturday) ==
Saint Vincent and the Grenadines flag

- The Caribbean nation of Saint Vincent and the Grenadines was granted independence from the United Kingdom after 352 years of British rule. Milton Cato continued as Prime Minister of the nation
- An explosion in a coal mine in Mungyeong in South Korea killed 43 miners.
- Died: Father Charles Coughlin, 88, controversial American Roman Catholic priest known for his conservative political radio program during the 1930s.

== October 28, 1979 (Sunday) ==
- Ten people were killed during a prisoner exchange program when a Mexican government plane, a twin-engine Otter turboprop, crashed in the United States as it approached the airport in San Diego. The dead included four American prisoners who were being transported back to the U.S. under a 1977 agreement between the U.S. and Mexico.
- The first annual "Tbilisoba", an October festival to celebrate the history of the Eastern European nation of Georgia, was held it Tbilisi, capital of the Soviet Union's Georgian SSR, at the initiative of Eduard Shevardnadze, the First Secretary of the Georgian SSR's Communist Party.
- Allegheny Airlines, originally a regional airline in the eastern United States from Pittsburgh, changed its name to USAir and expanded its itinerary. Rebranded in 1997 as US Airways, it would be acquired by American Airlines in 2013.
- Born:
  - Jawed Karim, East German-born Bengali-American software engineer and co-founder of YouTube; in Merseburg, Saxony-Anhalt
  - Martin Škoula, Czech ice hockey defenceman with 16 seasons in the National Hockey League; in Litoměřice, Czechoslovakia

== October 29, 1979 (Monday) ==
- Robert Boulin, 59, French Minister of Labor, disappeared after having had lunch with his son. Boulin, who had recently been accused of corruption, was found dead the next day in a pond near the forest of Rambouillet, and an empty bottle of barbiturates was found in his car, along with several suicide notes.

== October 30, 1979 (Tuesday) ==
- Fifty people were killed and 30 injured in the derailment of a train that was traveling to Addis Ababa in Ethiopia from Djibouti (in the northeast African nation of the same name). The accident occurred as the train was approaching Djibouti's second-largest city, Ali Sabieh.
- An Air France Concorde jetliner came within 10 feet (3.0 m) of colliding with a formation of five United States Air Force F-15 fighters at an altitude of 28,000 feet (8,500 m) after F-15 jets had descended into its path. The Concorde had taken off from Washington's Dulles International Airport with 16 passengers and a crew of five and was over the Atlantic Ocean about 50 miles (80 km) southeast of New Jersey when the near-collision happened at 2:30 in the afternoon. Information about the close call was not publicly released until five weeks later on December 7.
- Magsat, the Magnetic Field Satellite, was launched by the United States from Vandenberg Air Force base in California in order to map Earth's magnetic field.
- A mob of 300 leftist protesters in San Salvador attacked the U.S. Embassy to El Salvador, firing guns and attempting to break into the building before being turned back by guards of the U.S. Marines, who were supplemented shortly afterward by the Salvadoran Army.
- The U.S. city of Birmingham, Alabama, at one time newsworthy for its racial segregation, elected its first African-American Mayor, as Richard Arrington defeated white challenger Frank Parsons.
- Born: Yukie Nakama, Japanese idol and actress; in Urasoe, Okinawa
- Died:
  - Sir Barnes Wallis, 92, English inventor and engineer known for creating the first "bouncing bomb", the Upkeep, during World War II.
  - Rachele Mussolini, 89, Italian political figure known for her 30-year marriage to Benito Mussolini

== October 31, 1979 (Wednesday) ==
- Western Airlines Flight 2605 crashed when the DC-10 landed on a closed runway at Mexico City at the end of its flight from Los Angeles, killing 72 of the 89 people on board, along with one person on the ground.
- Midway Airlines, created to draw flights to Chicago's Midway International Airport, began its first flight, with three Douglas DC-9 jets making low-cost flights from Midway to Cleveland, Kansas City and Detroit. It would go bankrupt in 1991.
- The government of the Philippines created the Gintong Alay ("Golden Harvest") program for the Ministry of Youth and Sports Development to increase Philippine success in track and field athletics.
- Died:
  - Eddie Bentz, 85, American bank robber who was incarcerated at Alcatraz federal prison from 1936 to 1948.
  - Shirley Lynette Ledford, 16, the fifth and final victim of the serial murder team of Lawrence Bittaker and Roy Norris, was kidnapped while hitchhiking home from a party in Los Angeles, then tortured and strangled to death. The pair of killers was arrested three weeks later.
