= Hillman Foundation =

Hillman Foundation may refer to:

- The Benji Hillman Foundation, an Israeli foundation that helps soldiers
- Elsie H. Hillman Foundation of the Hillman Family Foundations, 18 named foundations
- The Sidney Hillman Foundation, awards prizes to journalists
