= September 1979 =

Month of 1979

<<	September 1979					>>
Su	Mo	Tu	We	Th	Fr	Sa
						1
2	3	4	5	6	7	8
9	10	11	12	13	14	15
16	17	18	19	20	21	22
23	24	25	26	27	28	29
30

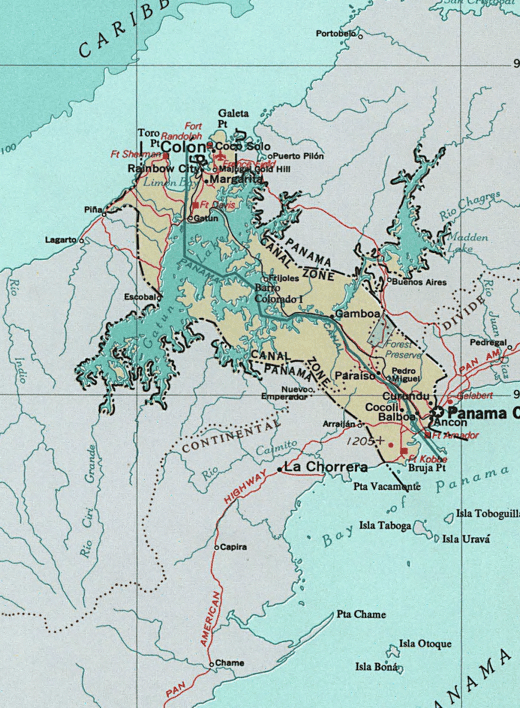
September 30, 1979: The U.S. Canal Zone territory of Panama goes out of existence

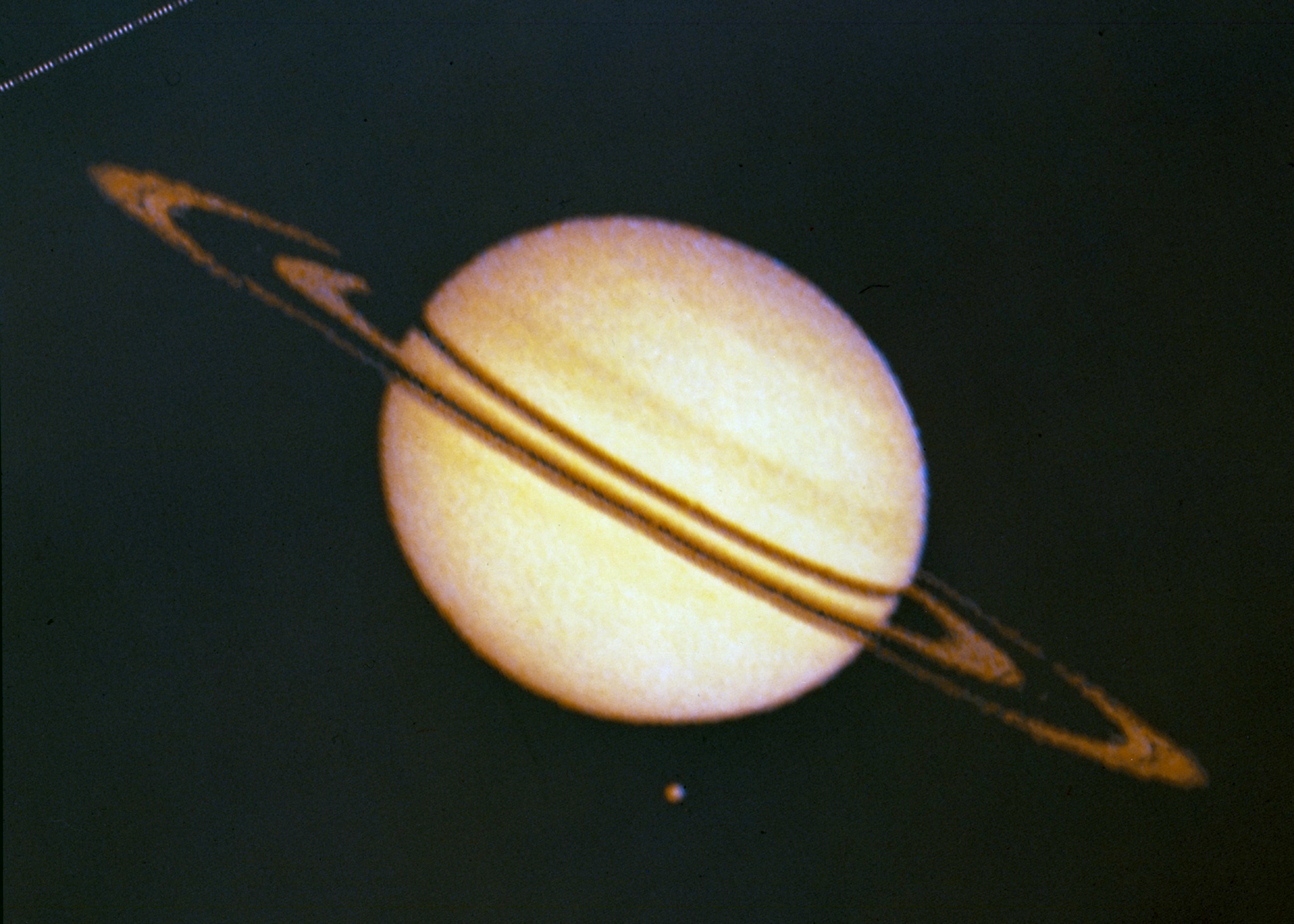
September 1, 1979: Pioneer 11 becomes the first Earth spacecraft to visit the planet Saturn

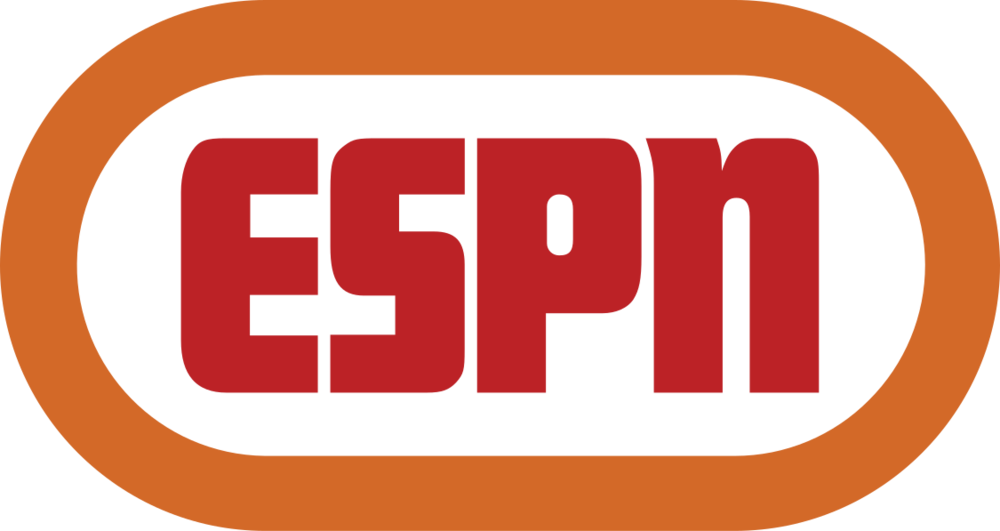
September 7, 1979: The Entertainment and Sports Programming Network first appears on cable television

The following events occurred in September 1979:

== September 1, 1979 (Saturday) ==
- The U.S. interplanetary probe Pioneer 11 became the first Earth spacecraft to visit Saturn when it passed the planet at a distance of less than 13,000 miles (21,000 km). At 16:29:34 UTC it came within 20,591 km (12,795 mi) of Saturn. Less than two hours earlier, it had come within 6,676 kilometres (4,148 mi) of the moon Epimethus.
- Hurricane David swept through the Dominican Republic as a Category 5 storm, devastating much of the western side of the island of Hispaniola and killing at least 2,000 people there. Neighboring Haiti, on the eastern side of Hispaniola, was not affected.
- A 33-year old woman, Jessie Thomas, became the first person to receive an artificial spine, following a successful 19-hour surgery at the University of Maryland in Baltimore during which a metal device took the place of four vertebrae of her lower back. Dr. Charles Edwards designed the metal spinal prosthesis and led the surgical team in performing the surgery.
- Color television was introduced to Indonesia as the TVRI (Televisi Republik Indonesia) network began color broadcasting.
- The Australian rock band INXS performed its first concert under that name, after having been formed on August 16, 1977 by Andrew, Jon and Tim Farriss as "The Farriss Brothers". After briefly performing as "The Vegetables" in 1978, the group adopted its current name shortly before playing at the Ocean Beach Hotel in Umina, New South Wales.
- Died:
  - Doris Kenyon, 81, American film and TV actress
  - Aaron Rosenberg, 67, American college athlete and film producer

== September 2, 1979 (Sunday) ==
- The Transglobe Expedition, the first trip around the world from south to north to both poles, began as Ranulph Fiennes, Charles R. Burton, and Oliver Shepard departed London. They would reach the South Pole on December 15, 1980 and the North Pole on April 11, 1982, before returning to London on August 29, 1982.
- The championship game of the Gaelic Athletic Association's hurling competition was played at Croke Park in Dublin before a crowd of over 53,000 between Kilkenny GAA of Leinster, and Galway GAA of Connacht. Kilkenny won 2-12 (two three-point goals and 12 points) to 1-8, equivalent to an 18 to 11 win.

Zimbabwe Rhodesia flag

- The first, and only, flag of Zimbabwe Rhodesia was approved by the transitional government of the southern African nation.
- The Palace of Gold of the International Society for Krishna Consciousness was dedicated in the relatively new, unincorporated community of New Vrindaban, West Virginia, near Moundsville in Marshall County.
- Born: Ron Ng (Ron Ng Cheuk-hei), Hong Kong TV actor Iten, Kenya
- Died: Felix Aylmer, 90, English character actor

== September 3, 1979 (Monday) ==
- The U.S. Navy combat supply ship USS White Plains rescued 154 Vietnamese refugees in the South China Sea, the largest number saved by the U.S. since it had started its search for "boat people" in July. A U.S. Navy Lockheed P-3 Orion patrol plane had spotted two overloaded boats 285 miles (459 km) from the Philippines.
- Aeroflot Flight 513 crashed in the Soviet Union as it was approaching the airport in Amderma, after having taken off from Arkhangelsk on a 650 mi (1,050 km) trip. Only three of the 43 people on board survived when the plane crashed on a hillside.
- Born: Júlio César (Júlio César Soares de Espíndola), Brazilian soccer football goalkeeper with 87 caps for the Brazil national football team; in Duque de Caxias, Rio de Janeiro

== September 4, 1979 (Tuesday) ==
- The United States banned the importation of tuna from Canada in retaliation for the seizure of 19 American tuna fishing boats by the Canadian Coast Guard on charges of fishing in Canada's territorial waters, defined by Canadian law as within 200 miles (320 km) of Canada's coastline. The cargo of each of the 19 boats had been confiscated, and a company was required to post a $5,000 bond for the release of a boat pending criminal action. At the time, the amount of Canada's exports of tuna to the U.S. was worth only $130,000.
- Died:
  - Alberto di Jorio, 95, Italian Roman Catholic Cardinal and Vatican Bank advisor
  - Guy Bolton, 96, English screenwriter and playwright

== September 5, 1979 (Wednesday) ==
- Ann Meyers became the first woman to be signed to a National Basketball Association (NBA) player's contract, receiving $50,000 by the Indiana Pacers and an opportunity to try to make the team. At 5'9" (1.75 m) and weighing 134 pounds (61 kg), Meyers had led the U.S. national team in the 1979 FIBA women's basketball world championship and had chosen not to play in the first season of the Women's Professional Basketball League (WPBL). While she would be cut from the Pacers on September 12, Meyers would sign with the WPBL's New Jersey Gems and become that league's most valuable player. She would later be inducted to the Basketball Hall of Fame.
- Computer manufacturer International Business Machines (IBM) and recorded music manufacturer MCA announced a joint venture, Disco-Vision Associates, to manufacture a less expensive system for videodiscs and players, a forerunner of the smaller-diameter and larger capacity DVD.
- Born: John Carew, Norwegian soccer football striker with 91 caps for the Norway national team; in Lørenskog

== September 6, 1979 (Thursday) ==
- U.S. President Jimmy Carter commuted the long prison sentences given to four Puerto Rican nationalists in the 1950s who had been convicted of attempted assassinations, including that of Oscar Collazo, who had attempted to kill U.S. President Harry S Truman. Collazo had been incarcerated for almost 29 years, since his attempt to kill President Truman on November 1, 1950. Clemency was also granted to three nationalists who had wounded five U.S. Representatives on March 1, 1954, when they shot from the gallery during an attack on the U.S. Capitol. Lolita Lebrón, Irvin Flores Rodriguez and Rafael Cancel Miranda had served 25 years of sentences of up to 75 years. Carter had previously freed a fourth defendant from the 1954 attack, Andres Figueroa Cordero, in 1977.

== September 7, 1979 (Friday) ==
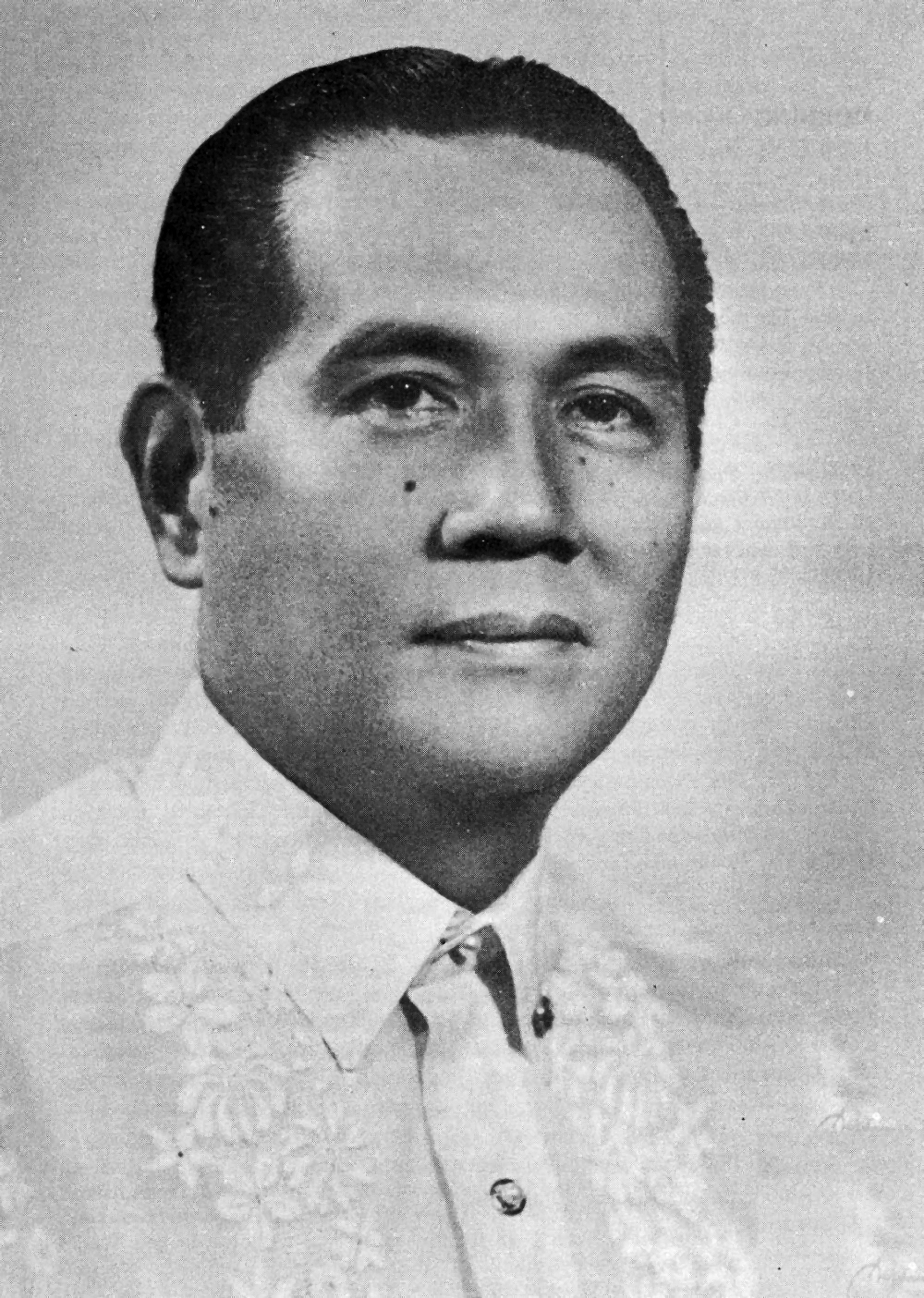
former President Macapagal

- The first cable sports channel, the Entertainment and Sports Programming Network (better known as ESPN), was launched in the United States at 7:00 p.m. Eastern Time on participating cable television systems. The first program was a half-hour segment called "ESPN Premiere", followed by a preview of the 1979 college football season.
- Diosdado Macapagal, the former President of the Philippines, was charged with sedition and arrested in Manila by the government of his successor, President Ferdinand Marcos. The charges arose from Macapagal's criticism of martial law while at a birthday dinner. In 1976, Macapagal had published a book, Democracy in the Philippines, which called upon the nation's armed forces to overthrow the Marcos government "to free the people from dictatorship".
- Born: Nathan Hindmarsh, Australian National Rugby League player and five-time winner of the Provan-Summons Medal; in Bowral, New South Wales

== September 8, 1979 (Saturday) ==
- Soccer Bowl '79, the championship game of the North American Soccer League (NASL) was played before a crowd of 50,699 at Giants Stadium in New Jersey. The Vancouver Whitecaps defeated the Tampa Bay Rowdies, 2 to 1, with both goals scored by Trevor Whymark of England.
- Born: P!nk (stage name for Alecia Beth Moore), American R&B singer; in Doylestown, Pennsylvania

== September 9, 1979 (Sunday) ==
- As part of its campaign to eliminate the Baháʼí Faith in Iran, the government of the Islamic Republic of Iran demolished the House of the Báb in Shiraz, the 19th century home of the founder of Bábism, Sayyed `Alí Muḥammad Shírází.
- Tracy Austin, a 16-year old professional tennis star, became the youngest person to win the U.S. Open when she defeated Chris Evert Lloyd in straight sets, 6-4 and 6-3. 20-year old John McEnroe then became the youngest man to win the tournament when he beat Vitas Gerulaitis in straight sets, 7-5, 6-3 and 6-3.
- Died:
  - Norrie Paramor, 65, British record producer
  - Mahmoud Taleghani, 68, Iranian Shi'a Muslim theologian and member of the Council of the Islamic Revolution

== September 10, 1979 (Monday) ==
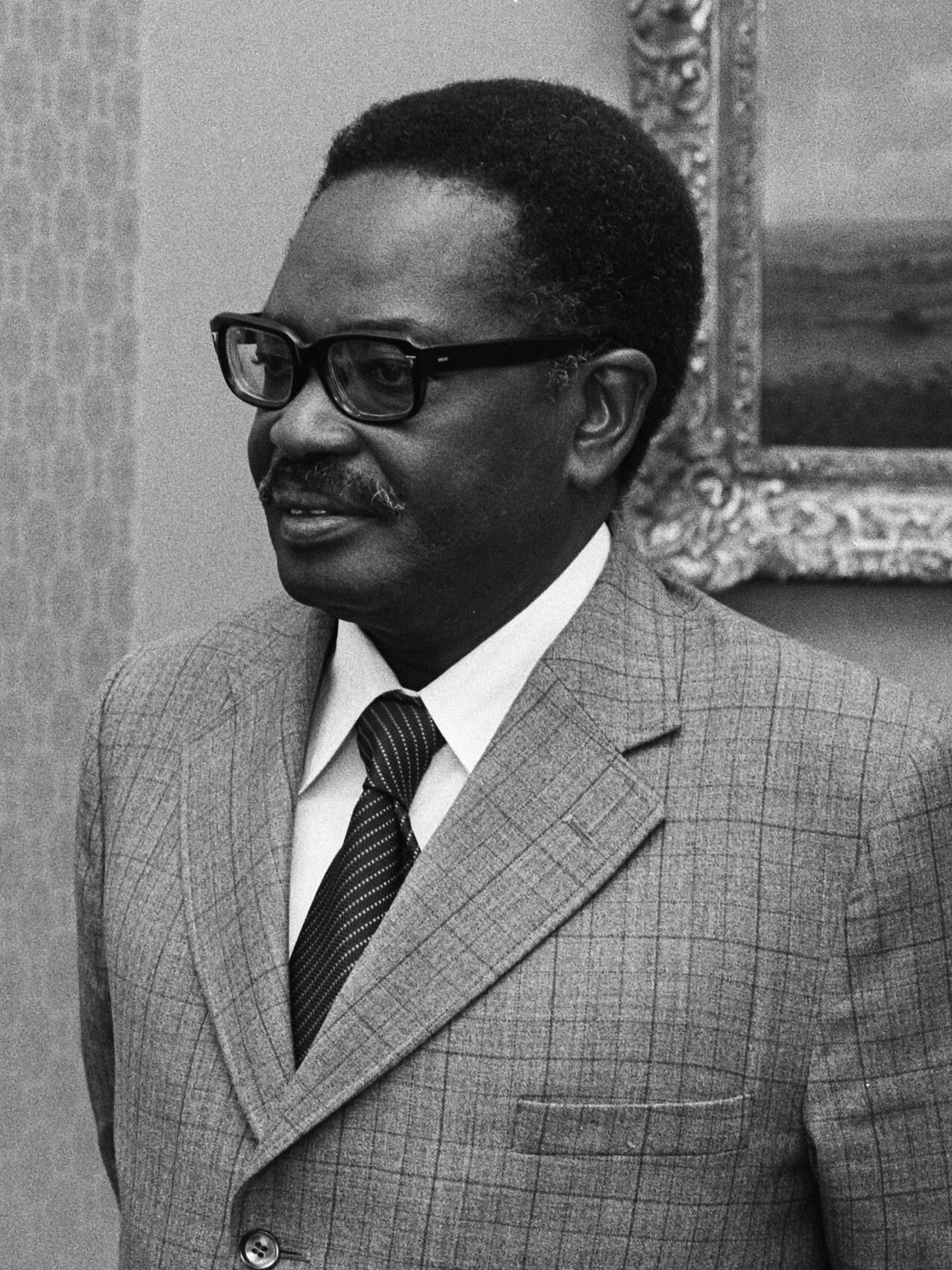
Angola's President Neto

- Agostinho Neto, President of Angola since its independence in 1975, died while undergoing surgery for cancer at a hospital in Moscow. Lúcio Lara, the General Secretary for the ruling MPLA (Movimento Popular de Libertação de Angola), took over briefly as acting president until Vice President José Eduardo dos Santos could be approved to take over from Neto.
- The long-running comic strip For Better or For Worse, by Canadian cartoonist Lynn Johnston, made its first appearance in newspapers in the United States and Canada.
- Died: Stanyslav Lyudkevych, 100, Ukrainian composer and musicologist named People's Artist of the USSR

== September 11, 1979 (Tuesday) ==
- Portugal's President António Ramalho Eanes signed a decree dissolving the 250-seat Assembleia da República and scheduled new elections to take place on December 2.
- For the first time in the history of the United States Navy, women were deployed overseas on a warship when about 50 female sailors and six officers were sent to patrol the Mediterranean Sea on the 730-member repair ship USS Vulcan.
- Afghanistan's leader Nur Muhammad Taraki, who had traveled to a summit, in Cuba, of the leaders of Communist nations, returned to Kabul, with instructions from the Soviets to dismiss Defense Minister Hafizullah Amin. Instead of accepting a transfer to an overseas job, Amin confronted Taraki at a cabinet meeting and told Taraki to step down.
- U.S. Representative Raymond Lederer (D-Pennsylvania) met with two representatives of an Arab sheik and accepted a $50,000 bribe in exchange for his pledge to help the men's client obtain entry into the United States. Despite being re-elected overwhelmingly in 1980 while under indictment, Lederer would resign from the House of Representatives on April 29, 1981, a day after a House Committee voted in favor of expelling him. Lederer would later serve 10 months in a minimum security prison near Allenwood, Pennsylvania.
- Born:
  - Ariana Richards, American actress and Young Artist Award winner; in Healdsburg, California
  - Eric Abidal, French soccer football defender with 67 caps for the France national team, 2004 to 2013; in Saint-Genis-Laval
- Died: Stephen Hemsley Longrigg, 86, British colonial administrator and negotiator for the Iraq Petroleum Company who obtained oil rights for IPC in the Gulf States.

== September 12, 1979 (Wednesday) ==
- The eruption of the Mount Etna volcano in Italy killed at least nine tourists, and severely injured 12 others who required amputation of limbs because of burns. A rescue official reported that the death toll from the explosion of Etna was probably higher because "based on what we've seen so far, some victims must literally have been blown to pieces" while others were buried under large rocks.
- Hurricane Frederic struck the U.S. Gulf Coast with winds of 130 miles per hour (210 km/h) and caused heavy damage to a stretch of coast along the U.S. states of Florida, Alabama and Mississippi. Because of advance warning, the death toll was only nine people, compared to 250 killed when Hurricane Camille struck the same area in August 1969.
- Born: Michelle Dorrance, American choreographer and tap dancer, 2015 MacArthur Grant winner; in Chapel Hill, North Carolina
- Died: Les Clark, 71, American animator with the Walt Disney Studios

== September 13, 1979 (Thursday) ==
Venda

- South Africa granted nominal independence to the "tribal homeland" or Bantustan of Venda. The impoverished nation, located in northeast South Africa along the border with Zimbabwe, was recognized as sovereign only by South Africa, Zimbabwe Rhodesia, and Botswana. With a population of 320,000 and a capital at Thohoyandou, it was the third of a planned 10 black-ruled nations (after Transkei and Bophuthatswana), established by the white-minority government, which had set aside 13 percent of South Africa's land for relocation of much of its black population. Chief Patrick Mphephu was sworn in as the first President of the Republic of Venda.
- At least 50 people were killed in Yugoslavia when a heavily-loaded freight train crashed into the back of an express train transporting newly-recruited soldiers of the Yugoslavian Army. The accident happened outside of the railway station at the Serbian village of Stalać, when the freight train engineer went through a stop signal.
- The American television show Benson, a situation comedy starring Robert Guillaume, began a seven-season run as one of the few successful fall premieres of the 1979-1980 U.S. television season.

== September 14, 1979 (Friday) ==
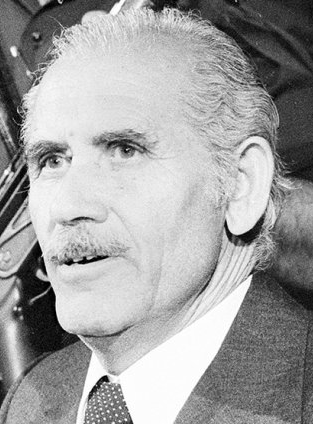
Afghanistan's President Taraki, arrested for murder

- Afghanistan's leader Nur Muhammad Taraki was arrested after instructing his bodyguards to shoot and kill Defense Minister Hafizullah Amin. Later in the day, Amin was chosen by the ruling People's Democratic Party of Afghanistan to replace Taraki as the new General Secretary and as the new head of state for Afghanistan as Chairman of the Presidium of the Revolutionary Council.
- All 31 people aboard ATI Flight 12 were killed when an Italian DC-9 jetliner crashed into a mountainside on the island of Sardinia at 2,000 feet (610 m), while approaching Cagliari. The multi-stop flight, with a final scheduled destination of Rome, had taken off from Alghero only 15 minutes earlier.
- All 12 firefighters aboard a DC-7 air tanker were killed when the airplane crashed into a mountain after dropping flame retardant on a fire at the Winema National Forest in the U.S. state of Oregon.
- Born:
  - Chris "The Dragon" John (Yohannes Christian John), Indonesian professional boxer and WBA Super Featherweight champion 2004 to 2013; in Banjarnegara, Central Java
  - Stuart Fielden, English professional rugby league prop forward, and English and British team member

== September 15, 1979 (Saturday) ==
- The popular video game Galaxian was introduced by the Namco corporation, initially in Japan before being marketed in the United States by Midway Manufacturing on February 2, 1980.
- U.S. President Jimmy Carter, the first to run in a ten-kilometre footrace while in office, almost collapsed from heat exhaustion while participating in a 10K run at Catoctin Mountain Park in Maryland. President Carter, a regular jogger at 54 years old, became ill about two-thirds of the way during the 6.2 mile race and required immediate medical attention from the White House physician, U.S. Navy Rear Admiral William M. Lukash, including an intravenous saline solution while lying on the ground. When his condition stabilized, he was driven to Camp David for more treatment, and had recovered by the next day.
- An unsuccessful TV show whose stars would go on to greater fame, Working Stiffs premiered on CBS. Starring Jim Belushi and Michael Keaton as a pair of brothers who were janitors, Working Stiffs was canceled after its fourth episode on October 20.
- Born:
  - Edna Kiplagat, Kenyan long-distance runner and winner of the women's division of the Boston Marathon (2017), the New York Marathon (2010) and the London Marathon (2014); in Iten
  - Dave Annable, American TV actor; in Suffern, New York
  - Amy Davidson, American TV actress; in Phoenix, Arizona
- Fiction: In the British TV series Still Game, Pete the Jakey claims to have invented the Beefy Bake on this date.

== September 16, 1979 (Sunday) ==
- Elections were held in Sweden for the 349-seat Riksdag, in a race that was not decided until the counting of mail-in ballots three days later. Although results from polling places initially indicated that a Socialist coalition of the Social Democrats and the Vänsterpartiet ("Left" party) would return to control the Riksdag for the first time since 1976, the final results showed that the non-Socialist parties (the People's Party, the Centre Party and the Moderate Party) were able to combine for 175 while the Social Democrats and Leftists had 174. The margin of difference was the examination of the mailed ballots, that showed that in one of the 310 elected constituencies, the Moderate Party had won a seat initially thought to have been won by the Social Democrats.
- Two families fled in a homemade hot-air balloon from East Germany to West Germany, crossing 23 miles (37 km) of the heavily-guarded border of the then-Communist nation and landing in the west after running out of fuel. Led by an aircraft mechanic, Hans-Peter Strelzik of Pössneck, the group of four adults and four children departed from a forest near Ziegenrück at 2:40 in the morning, and landed in Naila 20 minutes later.
- The Sugarhill Gang released Rapper's Delight in the United States, the first rap single to become a Top 40 hit on the Billboard Hot 100.
- Born:
  - Flo Rida (stage name for Tramar Lacel Dillard), American rapper and singer; in Carol City, Florida
  - Soo Ae (Park Soo-ae), South Korean film and TV actress
- Died:
  - Giovanni "Gio" Ponti, 87, Italian architect and furniture designer
  - Rob Slotemaker, 50, Dutch race car driver, was killed during a race at Circuit Zandvoort

== September 17, 1979 (Monday) ==
- Leonid Koslov and Valentina Koslova, principal dancers with Russia's Bolshoi Ballet, were given political asylum by the United States while the ballet company was in Los Angeles. Mr. and Mrs. Koslov had contacted the Los Angeles Police Department the day before, and the LAPD contacted federal agents. The defection came at the end of the company's U.S. tour, and almost four weeks after the August 22 defection of Alexander Godunov. The rest of the company flew back to the Soviet Union.

== September 18, 1979 (Tuesday) ==
- The Soviet husband-and-wife figure skating team of Lyudmilla Belousova and Oleg Protopopov, winners of Winter Olympic gold medals in 1964 and 1968, defected to the West a day before they were scheduled to fly from Geneva back to Moscow, after a four week tour of West Germany and Switzerland.
- In response to continuing price inflation in the United States, the Federal Reserve Board of the U.S. voted, 4 to 3, to raise the discount rate for commercial banks to a then-record high of 11 percent as a way of limiting the amount of money available to lenders. Chairman Paul A. Volcker cast the deciding vote to break a disagreement between the other six directors.
- Born: Junichi Inamoto, Japanese soccer football midfielder with 82 caps for the Japan national team; in Kagoshima

== September 19, 1979 (Wednesday) ==
- A mountain climber in France found the bodies of two U.S. Army Air Force fliers and the remnants of their warplane, believed to have crashed more than 34 years earlier in late 1944 or early 1945. The discovery was made at a glacier on a 9,200 foot (2,800 m) high Alpine peak above the town of Bourg-Saint-Maurice.
- Struck by Lightning, one of the least successful shows of the 1979 U.S. television season, premiered on the CBS network. A fantasy comedy featuring Frankenstein's monster, it was canceled two weeks later, after its third episode on October 3.

== September 20, 1979 (Thursday) ==
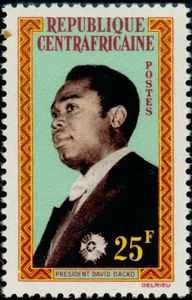
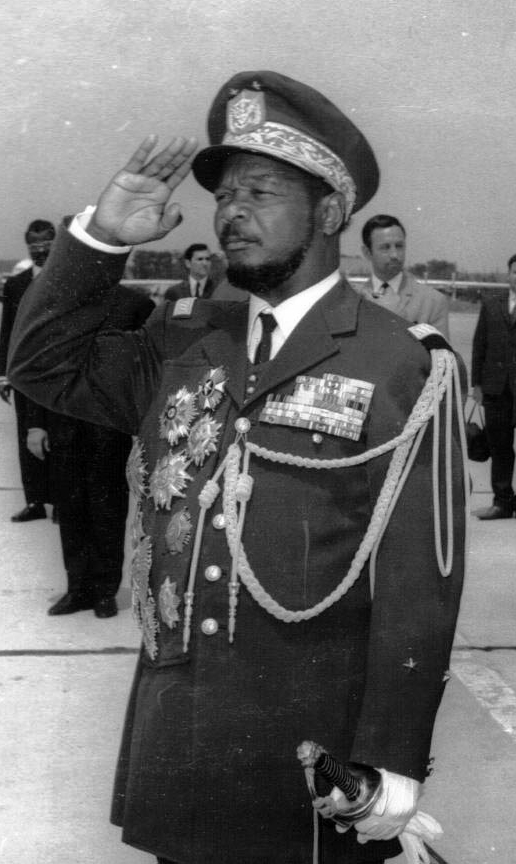
President Dacko replaces Emperor Bokassa I as Central African Empire comes to an end
- French paratroopers helped David Dacko to overthrow Emperor Bokassa in the Central African Empire. Bokassa was out of the country out of the time, visiting Libya. Dacko, a former president immediately restored the name of the nation to Central African Republic and became its president for a second time.
- Five people were killed by an earthquake in Italy, and more than 500 injured, and various ancient monuments in Rome sustained damage. The fatalities occurred in the villages of San Marco di Norcia and in Chiavano di Cascia. The Colosseum, the Arch of Constantine and the Column of Marcus Aurelius all were found to have "superficial" cracks after the quake and multiple aftershocks.
- The Treaty of Tarawa was signed between representatives of the United States and the newly-independent Republic of Kiribati as a "treaty of friendship and territorial sovereignty", acknowledging Kiribati's sovereignty of 14 islands in the South Pacific Ocean in return for being able to maintain military bases on the islands of Kanton, Enderbury and Hull.
- Ola Ullsten submitted his resignation as Prime Minister of Sweden four days after elections for the Riksdag, the lower house of Sweden's parliament.
- Theunis de Klerk, one of the white members of the Zimbabwe Rhodesia House of Assembly, was assassinated by a rocket attack on his home. His death was the second of an Assembly member, four days after Terrence Mashambanhaka was murdered by guerrillas who attacked him with axes on September 16.
- Died:
  - Ludvik Svoboda, 83, President of Czechoslovakia from 1968 to 1975
  - Ismail Nasiruddin of Terengganu, 72, former elected King (Yang di-Pertuan Agong) of Malaysia who reigned from 1965 to 1970
  - Pierre Goldman, 35, French leftist terrorist, was shot at point-blank range by a right-wing terrorist group.

== September 21, 1979 (Friday) ==
- A series of murders that would claim the lives of 12 women in its first year began in the U.S. state of Michigan in Detroit and its suburbs. Another 14 would be murdered in the two years that followed until the arrest of Carl Eugene Watts on May 23, 1982. The headless body of 34-year-old Mimi Haddad was found in Allen Park, Michigan. In the first year, women were murdered in Taylor, Detroit, Grosse Pointe Farms, Ann Arbor, Braeburn, and Southgate.
- The collision of two Royal Air Force Harrier jets, at an altitude of 8,000 feet (2,400 m), killed two men and a young boy on the ground in the village of Wisbech, Cambridgeshire, in England.
- The Cabinet of India voted to declare the Jewels of the Nizams of Hyderabad to be an Indian national treasure and ruled that it was not in the national interest to allow the jewelry collection to be taken out of the country. The ruling effectively ended a proposed auction of the collection. Both Stavros Niarchos, the Greek shipping magnate, and banker Abdul Wahab E. Galadari of Dubai had deposited $26 million with the auction house as an opening bid for the jewels.

== September 22, 1979 (Saturday) ==
- The "South Atlantic Flash" was observed near the Prince Edward Islands in the Indian Ocean, thought to be a nuclear weapons test conducted by Israel with assistance from South Africa.
- The University of Boyacá began operations in the city of Tunja in Colombia.
- Three members of a six-team Japanese mountain climbing team, led by Kenji Hirasawa, became the first persons to climb to the summit of Devi Mukut, at 21,811 feet (6,648 m) the 59th highest mountain in the world
- Born:
  - Peggy Flanagan, American politician and Native American activist, Senator-elect of Minnesota, in St. Louis Park, Minnesota
  - Koxa (Rodrigo ‘Koxa’ Augusto do Espírito Santo), Brazilian surfer who holds the world record for the highest wave successfully surfed, an 80 foot (24 m) high wave off of the coast of Portugal on November 8, 2017; in Jundiaí, São Paulo state
  - Rattanaballang Tohssawat, Thailand film and TV actor; in Bangkok
- Died:
  - Abul A'la Maududi, 75, Pakistani Islamic theologian and founder of the Jamaat-e-Islami
  - Otto Robert Frisch, 74, Austrian-born British nuclear physicist who coined the term "nuclear fission"
  - Edwin A. Keeble, 74, American architect

== September 23, 1979 (Sunday) ==
- Basque separatists assassinated Spain's military governor of the province of Guipuzcoa (now Gipuzkoa), Brigadier General Lorenzo Gonzales-Valles Sanchez, as he and his wife were walking through the Basque seaside resort of San Sebastián.
- The CBS medical drama television series Trapper John, M.D. premiered for the first of seven seasons on CBS, with actor Pernell Roberts continuing the role of the title character, who had been played in the film M.A.S.H. by Elliott Gould and then by Wayne Rogers in the TV series M*A*S*H.
- Born: Lote Tuqiri, Fijian rugby league and rugby union player for Australia's national teams; in Korolevu
- Died: Frederick Piper, 76, prolific English film and TV actor

== September 24, 1979 (Monday) ==
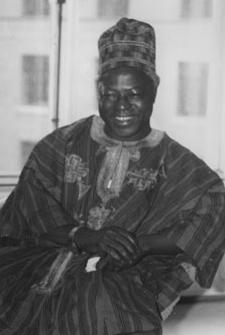
President Limann

- After more than seven years of military rule in the West African nation of Ghana, an elected civilian president and 140-member parliament were inaugurated. Hilla Limann, an economist and a former diplomat, was sworn into office. The leader of the Armed Forces Revolutionary Council, Flight Lieutenant Jerry J. Rawlings, told listeners in a radio broadcast that he was handing over power three months after overthrowing the previous government and that his fellow council members would "return to the barracks" and warned that "if people in power use their offices to pursue self-interest, they will be resisted and unseated, no matter how unshakeable their opposition may seem to be."
- Born:
  - Julia Clarete (stage name for Edda Nuñez Clarette), Filipino actress and co-host of Eat Bulaga! from 2005 to 2016; in Makati
  - Erin Chambers, American soap opera TV actress; in Portland, Oregon
  - Justin Bruening, American TV actor; in St. Helena, Nebraska
- Died: Carl Laemmle Jr., head of production of Universal Studios from 1928 to 1936

== September 25, 1979 (Tuesday) ==
- The government of Argentina released former newspaper publisher Jacobo Timerman, who had been held under house arrest since April 1977 without being charged with a crime. Timerman, who had founded the opposition newspaper La Opinión in Buenos Aires in 1971, was taken to an airport and placed on an Aerolineas Argentinas flight to Rome as part of an order expelling him from Argentina. Timerman would later publish a bestselling memoir of his experience, Prisoner Without a Name, Cell Without a Number.
- The Montreal Star, which had published for 111 years, announced that it had published its last issue.
- U.S. President Jimmy Carter signed legislation permitting the completion of the Tellico Dam hydroelectric project in Tennessee, almost three years after construction had been halted because of its threat to a species of fish on the Little Tennessee River, the snail darter (Percina tanasi). The project had stopped on January 31, 1977, because of a lawsuit brought under the Endangered Species Act (ESA), and the bill passed by Congress exempted the Tellico Dam project from the ESA. The dam was completed on November 29 and the Tellico Reservoir began forming.
- Born:
  - Michele Scarponi, Italian professional bicycle racer, 2011 Giro d'Italia winner; in Jesi, Marche region (killed 2017)
  - Rashad Evans, American mixed martial artist and UFC Light Heavyweight Champion; in Niagara Falls, New York

== September 26, 1979 (Wednesday) ==
- Under orders from Arizona Governor Bruce Babbitt, troops of the Arizona National Guard took over a chemical plant of the American Atomics Corporation in Tucson and seized 1,000 gallons of the radioactive hydrogen isotope tritium. The plant had been closed since July because of leaks of tritium that had been found to have contaminated food in a preparation facility that supplied all of Tucson's elementary schools, as well as a swimming pool and a senior citizen's center.
- Born: Taavi Rõivas, Prime Minister of Estonia 2014-2016; in Tallinn, Soviet-occupied Estonia
- Died:
  - John Cromwell, 92, American stage and film actor and director, 1952 Tony Award winner
  - Arthur Hunnicutt, 69, American character actor in film and TV

== September 27, 1979 (Thursday) ==
- The U.S. House of Representatives voted, 215 to 201, to approve the creation of a 13th Cabinet Level Unit in the federal government, the U.S. Department of Education, to be split off from the U.S. Department of Health, Education and Welfare (HEW). The Senate had approved the bill on September 24, 69 to 22.
- President Ferdinand Marcos of the Philippines granted amnesty to 1,602 people who had been arrested during the nation's period of martial law since 1972. The amnesty followed the amnesty already given to 705 people.
- Born:
  - Nathan Foley, Australian singer-songwriter and original member of the children's music show Hi-5; in Liverpool, New South Wales
  - Shinji Ono, Japanese soccer football midfielder with 56 caps for the Japan national team; in Numazu, Shizuoka Prefecture
- Died:
  - Gracie Fields, 81, British singer, comedienne and actress
  - Jimmy McCulloch, 26, Scottish former lead guitarist for the band Paul McCartney and Wings, died of heart failure from alcohol poisoning

== September 28, 1979 (Friday) ==
- A fire at the Am Augarten Hotel in Vienna killed 25 people after apparently having been started in a wastebasket in the hotel's reception area and then spreading up the elevator shafts of the four-story building.
- Born:
  - Bam Margera (Brandon Cole Margera) American skateboarder and stunt performer; in West Chester, Pennsylvania
  - Anndi McAfee, American voice actress for cartoons, particularly videos for The Land Before Time and Recess; in Los Angeles

== September 29, 1979 (Saturday) ==
- Pope John Paul II began his visit to the Republic of Ireland, arriving at Dublin to celebrate mass at Phoenix Park, then to the town of Drogheda before returning to Dublin. On the second day of his visit, he flew to Galway and then to Knock, County Mayo. On Monday, he flew to the seminary at Maynooth, then to Limerick before traveling back to Shannon Airport in County Clare, where he departed from Ireland to fly to the United States.
- General Roberto Viola, commander of the Army of Argentina, suppressed a revolt in Córdoba by the Argentine Third Army Corps after 30-hours, without bloodshed, after the intervention of 4,000 paratroopers. Major General Luciano Menendez was fired by General Viola, who would later become the South American nation's president.

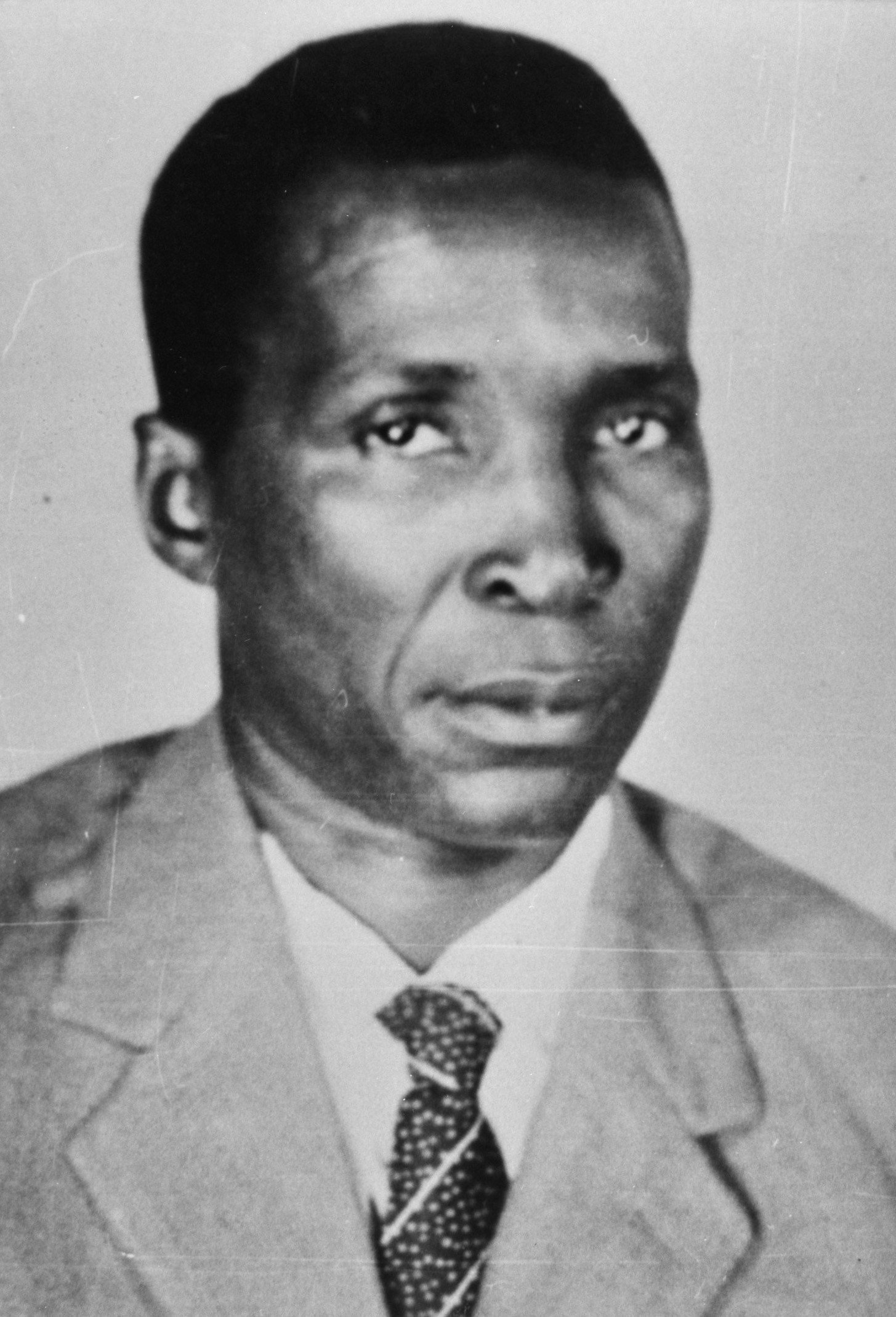
Executed former dictator Macias Nguema

- The overthrown dictator Francisco Macías Nguema of Equatorial Guinea was convicted of genocide and executed by firing squad.
- Born: Artika Sari Devi, Indonesian model and actress; in Pangkal Pinang, Bangka Belitung Islands
- Died: Ivan Wyschnegradsky, 86, Russian-born musical composer

== September 30, 1979 (Sunday) ==
- The Panama Canal Zone marked its last day of existence after 76 years of operation as a United States territory. The 533 sq mi (1,380 km^{2}) enclave, with a population of 12,000 Americans who described themselves as "Zonians", came under the control of Panama at the end of the day as the October 1 date of the U.S. and Panamanian treaty took effect. The U.S. would continued to control the Panama Canal itself until December 31, 1999.
- Alpha Ethniki began play as the first fully professional soccer football league in Greece, with 18 teams playing a 34-game schedule after decades as an amateur league.
- The NSL Cup of Australia's National Soccer League (NSL), a 32-team single-elimination tournament, was won by the NSL's Adelaide City FC, 3 to 2, over the semi-professional St George Saints of Sydney.
- The first annual Warsaw Marathon took place in Poland, after being organized privately as the Maraton Pokoju ("Marathon of Peace").
