= November 1979 =

Month of 1979

<<	November 1979					>>
Su	Mo	Tu	We	Th	Fr	Sa
				1	2	3
4	5	6	7	8	9	10
11	12	13	14	15	16	17
18	19	20	21	22	23	24
25	26	27	28	29	30

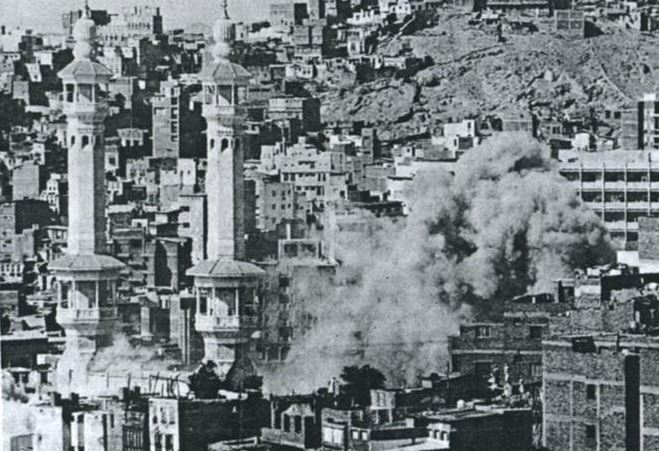
November 20, 1979: Extremists set fire to the holiest shrine in Islam, the Grand Mosque in Mecca.

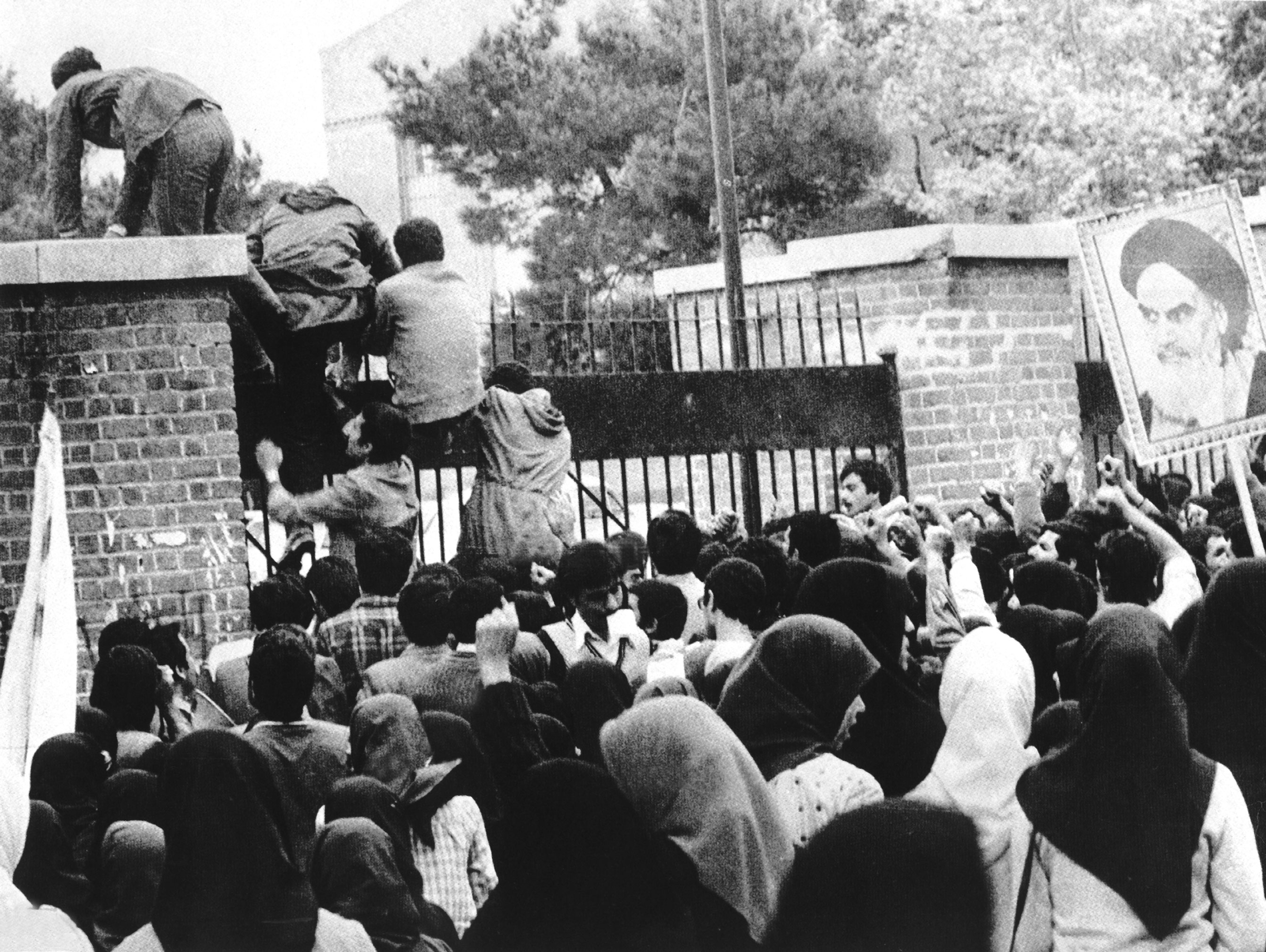
November 4, 1979: Iranian students seize U.S. Embassy in Tehran, take diplomatic personnel hostage

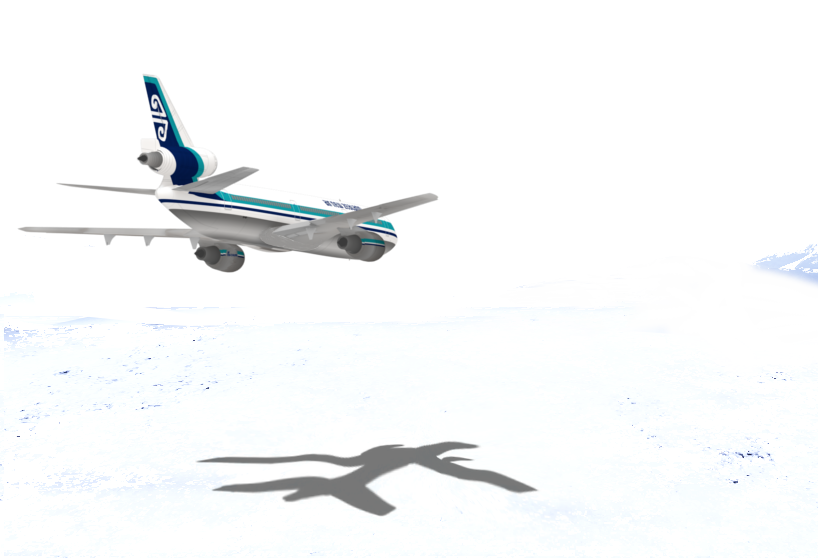
November 28, 1979: Air New Zealand Flight 901, a sightseeing flight over Antarctica crashed into Mount Erebus, killing all 257 people on board

The following events occurred in November 1979:

== November 1, 1979 (Thursday) ==
- A military coup led by Bolivian Army Colonel Alberto Natusch overthrew the government of Bolivian President Wálter Guevara. Soon after the takeover of the presidential residence in La Paz, the Palacio Quemado, rebel soldiers fired into a crowd of protesters, killing six of them after Natusch went on the radio and proclaimed himself the new President of Bolivia. The coup, and Colonel Natusch's presidency, ended after 16 days with the selection by the Bolivian Congress of a new civilian president to replace Guevara.
- Thirty-one people on board the oil tanker Burmah Agate were killed when the ship was rammed by the Mimosa, an abandoned, drifting freighter, about 5 mi (8.0 km) offshore from Galveston, Texas.
- In the United States, the United Auto Workers called a strike against the International Harvester Company as 35,000 employees walked off the job following a breakdown in negotiations, shutting down plants in eight states. The action came a day after chief executive officer Archie McCardell was given a $1,800,000 bonus by the company after the layoff of numerous IH employees. The strike would ultimately cost IH $600 million.
- Iran's Ayatollah Khomeini delivered a radio address and urged Iranian students to assemble for a massive protest in Tehran, to take place on Sunday, November 4 to observe the first anniversary of the massacre of 56 Tehran University students by the Army of the Shah of Iran. Khomeini urged students to "expand with all their might their attacks against the United States and Israel, so they may force the United States to return the deposed and cruel Shah", who was in the U.S. for medical treatment. The Iranian government provided security for the Embassy that day in response to rumors of a planned rally at the U.S. Embassy, but would fail to do the same on November 4.
- Video Concert Hall, the first music video program on television, was launched at 11:00 o'clock p.m. as an offering of cable's Madison Square Garden Sports Network (renamed in 1980 as the USA Network) and described as a show that would run on weeknights, featuring "well-known popular artists performing music ranging from rock to middle-of-the-road".
- Died:
  - Mamie Eisenhower (Mamie Geneva Doud Eisenhower), 82, First Lady of the United States from 1953 to 1961 as the wife of U.S. President Dwight D. Eisenhower
  - Albert Préjean, 85, French film actor

== November 2, 1979 (Friday) ==
- A team of gendarmes tracked down and killed France's most-wanted fugitive, Jacques Mesrine, wanted for murder, kidnapping and bank robbery, after following him to Porte de Clignancourt on the outskirts of Paris. Mesrine, nicknamed l'homme aux mille visages (the man of a thousand faces) for his many disguises, was hit by 15 bullets and died at the scene.
- Ecuador's President Jaime Roldós Aguilera signed a decree raising the national minimum wage from 2,000 to 4,000 sucres per month, the equivalent of $160 in 1979
- Assata Shakur (née Joanne Chesimard), a former member of the Black Panther Party and Black Liberation Army, escaped from the New Jersey State Prison for Women near Clinton after three African-American men came for a visit, seized two guards as hostages at gunpoint, and then commandeered a prison van for their escape. Chesimard/Shakur fled to Cuba and would remain there more than 40 years.

== November 3, 1979 (Saturday) ==
- In Greensboro, North Carolina, five members of the Communist Workers Party were shot to death and seven were wounded by a group of Klansmen and neo-Nazis, during a "Death to the Klan" rally.
- Pro football defensive end Ed "Too Tall" Jones of the Dallas Cowboys made his debut in a new sport, professional boxing, and won his first pro heavyweight bout, going against Abraham Yaqui Meneses in Las Cruces, New Mexico. After six bouts and a 6–0 record, he would retire from boxing and return to the Dallas Cowboys for the 1980 season.
- Born: Pablo Aimar, Argentine soccer football midfielder and national team member; in Río Cuarto, Córdoba

== November 4, 1979 (Sunday) ==
- The Iran hostage crisis began as several hundred Iranian radicals, mostly students, invaded the U.S. Embassy in Tehran and took 90 hostages (53 of whom were American). They demanded that the United States send the former Shah of Iran back to stand trial.
- Roger Mudd's interview with U.S. Senator Ted Kennedy was aired on a CBS Reports special, seen before Senator Kennedy's expected declaration of his candidacy and his challenge to U.S. President Jimmy Carter for the 1980 Democratic presidential nomination. In addition to questioning Kennedy about the Chappaquiddick incident, Mudd asked, "Senator, why do you want to be President?" Kennedy's stammering answer, which has been described as "incoherent and repetitive", as well as "vague, unprepared" raised serious questions about his motivation in seeking the office, and marked the beginning of the sharp decline in Kennedy's poll numbers. One commentator, Anthony Lewis of The New York Times, wrote that Kennedy's answers were "stumbling, inarticulate, unconvincing" and "in general seemed to be those of a man unsure of the why's and where's in his life... unsure of who he was." Kennedy said "The reasons that I would run are because I have great belief in this country, that it is— there's more natural resources than any nation of the world, there's the greatest educated population in the world... and the greatest political system in the world," and closed by saying "And I would basically feel that, that it's imperative for this country to either move forward — that it can't stand still — or otherwise it moves backward." Analyst James R. Dickerson of the Washington Star quoted Kennedy and said that Kennedy "came to his interview... prepared to answer questions about Chappaquiddick and his marital problems but not about why he wants to be president and what he would do if elected."

== November 5, 1979 (Monday) ==
- Troops supporting Colonel Alberto Natusch's junta in Bolivia initiated a violent crack-down on protesters, firing at them in downtown La Paz with guns and heavy artillery, then pursuing them into the poorer sections of the nation's capital and killing at least 15 in one day. General David Padilla, who had handed over control of the country to a civilian president in August, urged Bolivians to keep fighting against Natusch, saying in a statement "Never more than now, the armed forces, because of some ambitious, disloyal and unpatriotic men, are acting irresponsibly like criminals."
- The radio news program Morning Edition premiered on National Public Radio in the United States at six o'clock in the morning Eastern Time, with updated versions for stations located in other time zones.
- The Ayatollah Khomeini first referred to the United States as "The Great Satan".
- Born: Leonardo Nam, Argentine-born Australian actor; in Buenos Aires
- Died:
  - Al Capp (Alfred Caplin), 70, American comic strip cartoonist known for creating Li'l Abner
  - Amedeo Nazzari, 71, Italian film star of the 1940s and 1950s

== November 6, 1979 (Tuesday) ==
- A month after Japanese parliamentary elections had failed to restore the absolute majority that the Liberal Democratic Party (LDP) had once held in Japan's House of Representatives, Prime Minister Masayoshi Ohira was challenged for leadership of the LDP (and by extension, leadership of the Japanese government) by his predecessor, Takeo Fukuda. In a vote among the 256 LDP members of the House, Ohira defeated Fukuda, 138 to 121 on the second ballot, after failing to receive a majority of votes from a field of candidates.
- The civilian government of Iran's Prime Minister Mehdi Bazargan resigned abruptly, ending hopes of a quick resolution to the Iran hostage crisis and leaving the fate of the imprisoned American Embassy employees under the control of the Ayatollah Khomeini.
- For the first time ever, the Roman Catholic College of Cardinals was provided information about the details of the financing of the Roman Catholic Church, kept secret by the Pope and his advisers for centuries. A group of 120 cardinals assembled at Vatican City in closed session, under condition that the data not be revealed to the public, and at the direction of Pope John Paul II, heard reports from the Pope's economic advisers, headed by Giuseppe Caprio, Egidio Vagnozzi and Agostino Casaroli.
- Canada's Prime Minister Joe Clark narrowly overcame a vote of no confidence by only two votes (140 to 138), and only after his Progressive Conservative Party members of the House of Commons were joined by five members of the Social Credit Party.
- Died: Charles "Chick" Evans, 89, American golfer who won the U.S. Open in 1916 as an amateur.

== November 7, 1979 (Wednesday) ==
- In Boston, U.S. Senator Ted Kennedy announced that he would challenge President Jimmy Carter for the 1980 Democratic presidential nomination.
- Born: Samin Nosrat, American chef, newspaper columnist and author of the best-selling cookbook Salt Fat Acid Heat; in San Diego

== November 8, 1979 (Thursday) ==
- Retired Coca-Cola chairman Robert W. Woodruff made "the largest single donation in the history of American philanthropy" by transferring three million shares of participating interest in The Coca-Cola Company (about $150 million at the time) to Emory University in Atlanta. Adjusting for six stock splits to almost 300 million shares, the value of the original donation was 24 billion dollars forty years later.
- The ABC television network in the U.S. began the first regular late night news program, with a special report at 11:30 p.m. Eastern time, The Iran Crisis–America Held Hostage. The news feature would be renamed ABC News Nightline on March 24, 1980, and has now been on ABC for more than 40 years.
- Elections were held in the central African nation of Kenya for the unicameral National Assembly, with 742 candidates of the sole political party, the Kenya African National Union (KANU), vying for the 158 elected seats in the 170-member parliament. The election, the first since the death of President Jomo Kenyatta the year before, saw roughly half of the incumbents (including seven cabinet ministers) voted out of office, and the first white Kenyan representative (Philip Leakey) to be elected since the nation's independence.
- Los Angeles Lakers head coach Jack McKinney suffered a near-fatal head injury after crashing while riding a bicycle, and after only 13 games as an NBA head coach. Assistant Coach Paul Westhead took over as acting coach while McKinney recovered, and led the Lakers to the NBA championship. McKinney himself would be fired on May 13, having never returned to the job.
- Dick Vitale was fired from his job as head coach of the NBA Detroit Pistons after only 12 games, and would never coach basketball again. Vitale, who was hired by ESPN after being fired, would go on to greater fame and fortune as a sports commentator.
- Born:
  - Aaron Hughes, Northern Irish soccer football defender; in Cookstown, County Tyrone
  - Salvatore Cascio, Italian child actor who won a BAFTA Award for best supporting actor at the age of 8 for the film Cinema Paradiso; in Palazzo Adriano, Sicily
- Died: Yvonne de Gaulle, 79, widow of French President Charles de Gaulle, Première dame during his presidency from 1959 to 1969

== November 9, 1979 (Friday) ==
- NORAD computers and the Alternate National Military Command Center in Fort Ritchie, Maryland, detected, in what proved to be a false alarm, an apparent massive nuclear strike from the Soviet Union. The alert lasted six minutes and U.S. Department of Defense officials said that if the alert had "lasted even another minute, the information would have been passed to President Carter and Secretary of Defense Brown." According to The New York Times two days later, "at 10:50 A.M. Friday, a 'war game' tape was loaded into the NORAD computer in Colorado Springs, Colo., as part of a computer test." After a review of the raw data from satellites and early-warning radars, the alert was canceled.
- The trial in the murder of 13-year-old newspaper carrier Carl Bridgewater ended after five weeks, with a guilty verdict against all four defendants. Carl had been shot to death on September 19, 1978, after stumbling upon the robbery of a house on his route in Wordsley, Staffordshire in England. James Robinson Vincent Hickey was sentenced to life imprisonment for murder, with no parole prior to 2004. Michael Hickey was found guilty of murder and sentenced to indefinite detention. Patrick Molloy was found guilty on a lesser charge of manslaughter and sentenced to 12 years in prison.
- Born: Caroline Flack, English television host and presenter; in Enfield, London (d. 2020)

== November 10, 1979 (Saturday) ==
- The derailment of a 106-car Canadian Pacific freight train in Mississauga, Ontario, west of Toronto, caused a massive explosion and the release of chlorine gas. The accident happened at 11:53 p.m. local time and was initially reported as having happened in the early morning hours of Sunday, when the evacuation began. It forced the evacuation of 223,000 people, the largest in Canadian history, and the largest in North American history at the time. Residents were allowed to return to their homes three days later.
- The first "German Bowl", championship of the new American-Football-Bundesliga (AFB) was played between the teams with the two best records, the Frankfurter Löwen (Frankfurt Lions) and the Ansbach Grizzlies, with Frankfurt winning, 14 to 8, before a home crowd of 5,000 fans.

== November 11, 1979 (Sunday) ==
- Bassam Shakaa, the Palestinian mayor of the city of Nablus on Israel's occupied West Bank, was arrested by Israeli military authorities after the government filed a motion for a court order to have him deported to Jordan, Shakaa was seized when he arrived for a scheduled appointment with the military governor and taken to Ramla Prison near Tel Aviv. Nablus had been accused of expressing sympathy for terrorists, prompting the filing of criminal charges against him. The arrest of Mayor Shakaa began a 24-day crisis of civil disobedience against the Israeli occupation, beginning with the resignation of the entire city council and a general strike in the largest Palestinian municipality. Three days later, the mayors of the other 25 Palestinian cities in occupied territory announced their resignations. After 24 days, the Israeli government relented and released Shakaa from incarceration.
- Fourteen women, 13 of them residents of "a boarding home for the elderly and retarded" in Pioneer, Ohio and the other being the owner of the house, were killed in a fire. Another 13 survived, and the owner, 62 years old, died after she "had run back into the burning building to rescue residents." According to the owner's call to her son-in-law, the Pioneer police chief, a visiting four-year-old boy who had been playing with matches had accidentally set fire to a couch in the home's living room. Another 18 people, including the child, escaped unharmed.
- Dr. Ali Murad Davudi, a professor of philosophy at Iran's Tehran University and a member of the minority Baháʼí Faith in the Islamic republic, was kidnapped while walking by himself in a city park near his home, and was never seen in public again.
- Died: Dimitri Tiomkin, 85, Russian-born American film score composer known for composing the music for numerous classic westerns, including "The Ballad of High Noon", winner of four Academy Awards

== November 12, 1979 (Monday) ==
- In response to the hostage situation in Tehran, U.S. President Jimmy Carter ordered a halt to all oil imports from Iran.
- Süleyman Demirel, of the Justice Party became the new Turkish prime minister and formed a new cabinet of 28 ministers for the government from legislators of his political party.
- Born:
  - Cote de Pablo (María José de Pablo), Chilean-born American television actress best known as "Ziva David" in NCIS; in Santiago
  - Matt Stevic, Australian rules football field umpire; in Leongatha, Victoria

== November 13, 1979 (Tuesday) ==
- Sixteen people were killed by the government of Nepal in the Chhintang massacre.
- Former California Governor and film star Ronald Reagan announced that he was a candidate for the Republican Party nomination for the U.S. president for the 1980 election. Reagan would be elected the 40th President of the United States 357 days later.
- Professional basketball player Darryl Dawkins of the Philadelphia 76ers surprised NBA fans when he shattered the glass backboard while making a slam dunk of the ball against the host Kansas City Kings shortly after the beginning of the second half in the 76ers 110 to 103 loss. Dawkins and Kansas City's Bill Robinzine were both struck by the shards of glass, which cut Robinzine's hand; the crowd gave Dawkins a standing ovation for the feat. Although there were previous incidents of breaking the goal, Dawkins's feat, duplicated on December 3 when he shattered another board, led to the NBA modifying its equipment rules to make the rim collapsible.
- Born: Ron Artest, American professional basketball forward and former NBA Defensive Player of the Year; later known as "Metta World Peace" during the end of his career and as "Metta Sandiford-Artest" since 2020; in Queens, New York City

== November 14, 1979 (Wednesday) ==
- In response to the lack of any sign of the release of U.S. Embassy hostages from Iran, U.S. President Jimmy Carter issued Executive Order 12170, freezing all Iranian assets in the United States and U.S. banks. The action affected eight billion dollars of funds deposited in American banks and their foreign branches, all of which were prohibited from allowing the withdrawal of money that had been deposited in accounts prior to the overthrow of the Shah of Iran, as well as the sale of any real estate in the U.S. owned by the Iranian government. The freeze would remain in place after the release of the hostages in 1981; as of 2015, the amount of money alone was 1.973 billion dollars, and the real estate was valued at over 800 million dollars.
- Born: Mpule Kwelagobe, Botswana-born beauty pageant contestant who was Miss Universe in 1999, later a human rights activist; in Gaborone
- Died: Oliver Garrett, 84, American law enforcement officer during the Prohibition Era who was later convicted of extortion.

== November 15, 1979 (Thursday) ==
- American Airlines Flight 444, a Boeing 727 airliner flying from Chicago to Washington, made an emergency landing after a bomb exploded in its cargo hold, puncturing a hole in the fuselage and causing a quick loss of air pressure and a fire that produced smoke that injured 12 passengers. The 72 passengers and six crew were uninjured and the plane made an emergency landing at Dulles International Airport. The incident, along with other bombs that had been placed in packages, would lead to the FBI's search, for more than 16 years, for the identity of a suspect identified initially as "The Unabomber" and later found to be Ted Kaczynski. Kaczynski would eventually be arrested on April 4, 1996.
- Sir Anthony Blunt, British art historian and former Surveyor of the Queen's Pictures, was revealed to be the long-sought "fourth man" of the "Cambridge Five" that had served as double agents for the Soviet Union's spy agency, the NKVD, during World War II. The revelation came in a speech by Prime Minister Margaret Thatcher in the House of Commons. Blunt's knighthood, conferred upon him in 1954, was canceled, the first time a revocation of the honor had taken place since Sir Roger Casement was convicted of treason in 1916. Mrs. Thatcher told Commons that Blunt had been granted immunity from prosecution in 1964 because "Both at the time of his confession and subsequently, Blunt provided useful information about Russian intelligence activities and about his association with [Guy] Burgess, [Donald] Maclean and [Kim] Philby." She provided further details on November 21.
- The Romanian crude oil tanker Independența and the Greek freighter Evriali collided, causing an explosion that killed 43 crew members and ignited a fire that burned for 27 days to December.

== November 16, 1979 (Friday) ==
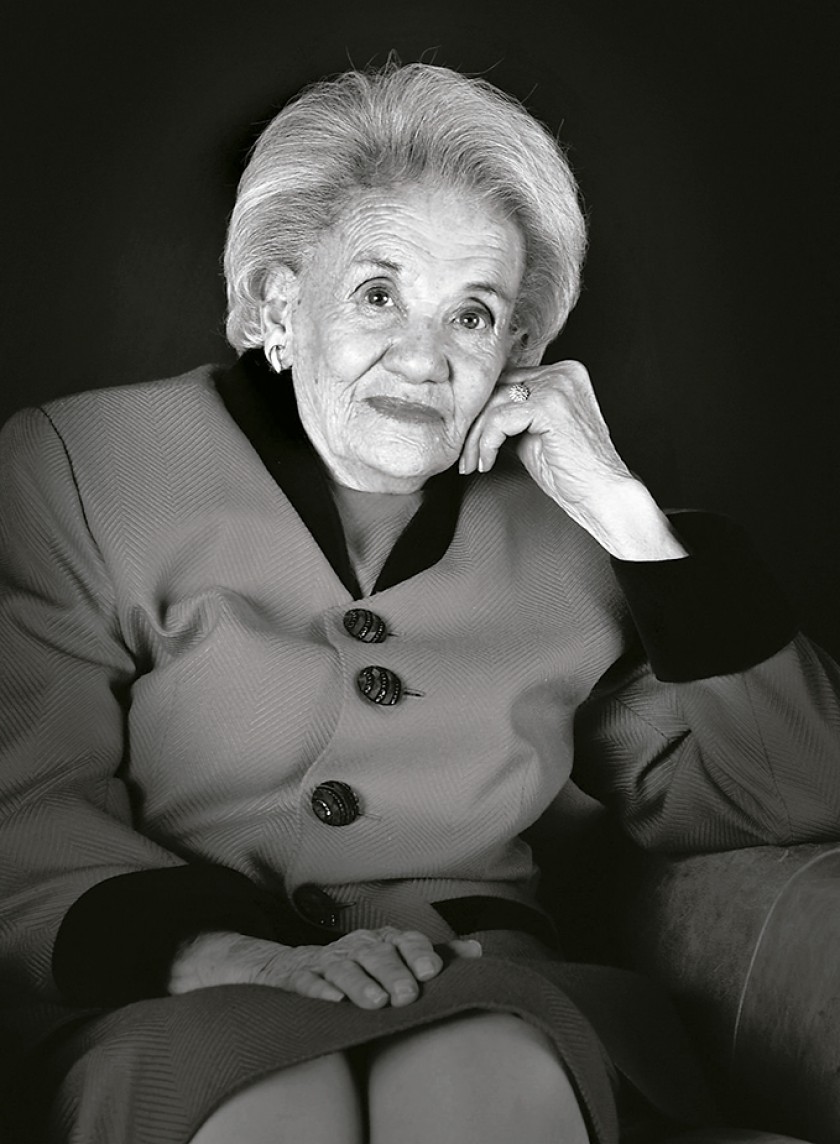
"La Presidenta de Bolivia", Lidia Gueiler Tejada

- Lidia Gueiler Tejada became the first female president of Bolivia, after being elected by the Bolivian Congress. Gueiler's selection came after "four days of lengthy secret negotiations between congressional and military leaders", nationwide strikes by the Bolivian Workers Confederation, and a proclamation signed by 250 military officers asking Colonel Alberto Natusch Busch to resign. Under the terms of the resolution electing her, Gueiler would serve until a new presidential election could be held in May. At the end of Colonel Natusch's 15 days as President of Bolivia after a November 1 coup d'état, 208 civilian protesters were killed, 207 injured and 124 were missing.
- The first subway in Romania, the Bucharest Metro, began service with trains running on an 8.63 km (5.36 mi) stretch of underground track in Bucharest between the Timpuri Noi and Semanatoarea stations.
- Sam Church became the new president of the United Mine Workers of America after the resignation of Arnold Miller, for whom Church had served as UMWA Vice President since 1972. Miller, who had suffered a stroke on March 29, 1978, had had a heart attack on November 12, a few days before resigning for health reasons.
- Nevada Airlines Flight 2504, chartered to fly tourists from Las Vegas to the Grand Canyon National Park, crashed on takeoff during its return flight, but the pilot was able to find a clearing during the forced landing. Despite a collision with trees and a subsequent fire, all 41 passengers and three crew were able to escape the Martin 4-0-4 airliner, with only six sustaining minor injuries. The passengers were all French nationals employed by the Coca-Cola Company in France.

== November 17, 1979 (Saturday) ==
- The Ayatollah Khomeini ordered the release of five women and eight African American men who were being held as hostages at the U.S. Embassy in Tehran. According to a reporter, the Ayatollah "had ordered the women hostages released because Islam held women in high regard, and the blacks because they had been oppressed in American society." Kathy Gross, who was a typist, and two black U.S. Marines were released on November 19, driven to the airport at Mehrabad, and placed on an SAS airliner for a flight to Copenhagen. The other 10 were released the next day. Two other women working at the embassy, Elizabeth Ann Swift and Kathryn L. Koob, remained captive.
- Died: Immanuel Velikovsky, 84, Russian-born pseudoscience author known for 1950's best-selling Worlds in Collision

== November 18, 1979 (Sunday) ==
- An American L-188 Electra turboprop airliner, manufactured by Lockheed Corporation and owned by Transamerica Airlines, lost all electrical power at an altitude of 12,000 feet (3,700 m). The plane had taken off without passengers, to haul cargo from Hill Air Force Base, near Ogden, Utah, to Las Vegas, then disintegrated in midair while plunging at a high rate of descent, killing the three crew members aboard. The doomed aircraft had first flown in 1960 and had been operating for almost 20 years.

== November 19, 1979 (Monday) ==
- All 16 people aboard an Ecuadorian Army helicopter were killed, including Ecuador's Minister of Defense, General Rafael Rodríques Palacios, along with his wife and daughter.
- Born:
  - Ryan Howard, American baseball player; in St. Louis
  - Barry Jenkins, American film screenwriter, director and producer, Academy Award-winner in 2017 for Moonlight; in Miami

== November 20, 1979 (Tuesday) ==
- The holiest shrine of Islam, Mecca's Grand Mosque (the Masjid al-Haram), was seized by a group of 200 Juhayman al-Otaybi militants on the first day of the new Islamic year (1 Muharram 1400 A.H.). The militants were driven out on December 4 by Saudi forces assisted by French commandos who were allowed into the city under these special circumstances, despite their being non-Muslims, after bloody fighting left 250 people dead and 600 wounded. Sixty-three of those convicted of the uprising would be beheaded in an execution which was televised live on Saudi Arabian television, on January 9, 1980.
- The first identified lunar meteorite on Earth, Yamato 791197, was discovered in Antarctica. Analysis of the mineral composition of the 52.4 gram rock determined in 1984 that Y-791197 had once been part of the lunar highlands on the far side of the Moon, ejected from the Moon by impact from another meteor. Subsequently, fragments of a meteorite that had been found earlier than Y-791197 would be determined in 1990 to have been of lunar origin.

== November 21, 1979 (Wednesday) ==
- Four people were killed in Pakistan when the U.S. Embassy in Islamabad was attacked by a mob and set afire, after false radio reports from the Iranian radio that the United States had caused the seizure of the Grand Mosque the day before. The Pakistani Army stormed the building and repelled the attack.
- Died: T. C. Chao (Tzu-ch'en Chao), 91, Chinese Protestant theologian

== November 22, 1979 (Thursday) ==
- South Africa's Prime Minister P.W. Botha convened the historic Carlton Conference at the Carlton Hotel in Johannesburg, appearing before a group of 300 business leaders, directors of government agencies, and Botha's entire cabinet of ministers.

== November 23, 1979 (Friday) ==
- Terrorist Thomas McMahon of the Provisional Irish Republican Army was sentenced to life imprisonment in the Republic of Ireland for the August assassination of Lord Mountbatten of Burma and the murder of several other people. In 1998, after serving 18 years in prison, he would be released on August 6, 1999, as part of the Good Friday Agreement between the United Kingdom and the IRA.
- Born:
  - Yashar Ali, American journalist, as Yashar Ali Hedayat in Chicago
  - Ivica Kostelić, Croatian alpine skier and gold medalist in the slalom at the 2003 World Championships; in Zagreb, SR Croatia, Yugoslavia
- Died: Merle Oberon, 68, British film and television actress, Academy Award winner for The Dark Angel

== November 24, 1979 (Saturday) ==
- After consulting with Islamic religious leaders, the Saudi Arabian National Guard made a counterattack to drive out radicals who had seized the Grand Mosque in Mecca four days earlier.

== November 25, 1979 (Sunday) ==
- The relatively new "California roll" was first referred to in the press, in a review by Los Angeles Times food critic Dick Roraback of Niikura, a Japanese restaurant in Tarzana, California. Created by Masayuki "Nick" Niikura, the California roll was a seaweed wrap "of shrimp, avocado, rice rolled in sesame seeds, [and] a cucumber 'flower' sprouting from the middle".
- Born: Joel Kinnaman, Swedish-born American film and television actor; in Stockholm

== November 26, 1979 (Monday) ==
- All 156 people on board Pakistan International Airlines Flight 740 were killed shortly after the Boeing 707 took off from Jeddah in Saudi Arabia, bound for Karachi. Fifteen minutes after takeoff, when the jet was at 37,000 feet (11,000 m), a fire broke out in the rear of the plane and Flight 740 was cleared to descend to 4,000 feet (1,200 m) for an emergency landing. After a mayday call at 2:03 a.m. local time, no further communications were heard. The burned wreckage of the jet was found on a level hillside 48 miles (77 km) north of Ta'if.
- The International Olympic Committee approved the Nagoya Resolution, to assure China's return to Olympic Games. The resolution also allowed Taiwan Olympic and sports teams to participate in future Olympic Games and qualifying tournaments and championships on condition that they use the name Chinese Taipei.
- Died: Marcel L'Herbier, 91, French film director

== November 27, 1979 (Tuesday) ==
- During the absence of Alexei Kosygin, the Premier of the Soviet Union (as Chairman of the Council of Ministers), First Deputy Premier Nikolai Tikhonov was promoted to full membership in the Soviet Communist Party's Politburo, which controlled most of the policies of the Soviet government. Tikhonov's promotion raised the number of voting members of the Politburo to 14. Tikhonov would replace Kosygin as Premier less than a year later, two months before Kosygin's death.
- For the first time in its history, the United States Postal Service reported that the agency had a surplus of assets. The last time the agency charged with delivering the mail, the USPS and its predecessor, the U.S. Post Office, had operated without a deficit had been in 1945.
- Born: Ricky Carmichael, American AMA Motocross, seven-time AMA Motocross Championship and five-time AMA Supercross Championship winner; in Clearwater, Florida

== November 28, 1979 (Wednesday) ==
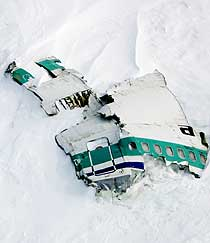
Wreckage of Flight 901 on the mountainside

- In the first-ever airline crash in Antarctica, all 257 people on Air New Zealand Flight 901 were killed when the DC-10 jumbo jet crashed into Mount Erebus during a sightseeing trip. The crash happened on Ross Island rather than on the Antarctic continent, but still within Antarctic territory. The last message sent from the pilot to the control tower in Auckland, was that he was descending to an altitude of 2,000 feet (610 m), apparently to give the sightseers a closer view of Mount Erebus.
- Goalie Billy Smith of the National Hockey League's New York Islanders was the first NHL goaltender to be credited with scoring a goal, although Smith had not made the scoring shot. In the 7 to 4 loss at Denver against the NHL's Colorado Rockies, Colorado's goalie Bill McKenzie had been pulled to allow a sixth person on offense, "but an errant pass by Colorado's Rob Ramage sailed the length of the ice and into the Rockies' goal. The goal was initially credited to the Islanders' Dave Lewis, but a determination was made that Smith had been the last Islanders player to touch the puck. On December 8, 1987, Ron Hextall of the Philadelphia Flyers would become the first NHL goalie to actually score a goal in an NHL game.
- Born:
  - Chamillionaire (stage name for Hakeem Temidayo Seriki), American hip-hop artist known for the platinum-selling The Sound of Revenge, 2007 Grammy Award winner; in Washington, D.C.
  - Jamie Korab, Canadian Winter Olympics gold medalist and lead for the national curling team; in Harbour Grace, Newfoundland
  - Daniel Henney, American film and TV actor; in Carson City, Michigan

== November 29, 1979 (Thursday) ==
- The historic case of Brown v. Board of Education was reopened by U.S. District Judge Richard D. Rogers in Topeka, Kansas, more than 25 years after 1954 U.S. Supreme Court decision that mandated the end of racial segregation in public schools. The motion to reopen was filed by Linda Brown Smith, on whose behalf the Topeka case had been filed when she was a child, and who had standing as the mother of two pupils in the Topeka school system. In the reopened case, referred to as Brown III, the plaintiffs challenged Topeka's policy of open enrollment on the basis that the desegregation order had not been fully carried out, noting that one school's student population was 74% black while another one was 97% white. By 1999, Topeka's reforms (including redefining the districts and creating magnet schools) would be accepted and the matter closed.
- The controversial Tellico Dam in east Tennessee, interrupted during its construction by the discovery of an endangered species of fish, the snail darter in the Little Tennessee River, was finished as the gates were opened to begin filling the 25 sq mi (65 km^{2}) Tellico Lake.
- Born: The Game (stage name for Jayceon Taylor, bestselling American West Coast hip-hop artist known for his album The Documentary; in Compton, California
- Died:
  - Saint Philoumenos of Jacob's Well (Sophocles Hasapis), 66, Eastern Orthodox priest who guarded the Biblical site of Jacob's Well on the West Bank of Israel, was hacked to death with an axe by a mentally ill resident of Tel Aviv after being forced outside of the monastery by a hand grenade. Philoumenos would be recognized in 2009 as a martyr of the Eastern Orthodox Church.]
  - Jean-Mohammed Abd-el-Jalil, 75, Moroccan Roman Catholic priest and Islamic scholar

== November 30, 1979 (Friday) ==
- Patriarch Demetrios I, the spiritual leader of Eastern Orthodox Christians as Ecumenical Patriarch of Constantinople, and visiting Pope John Paul II, the spiritual leader of the Roman Catholic Church, met in Istanbul, where John Paul became the first Roman Catholic Pope in more than 900 years to attend an Orthodox Mass. The Mass was celebrated at St. George's Cathedral as the two religious leaders pledged in a joint declaration to "hasten the day of full communion between the Catholic Church and the Orthodox Church" to heal the "Great Schism" that had split the two churches in the year 1054.
- The French National Assembly voted, 271 to 201, to make the legalization of abortion, within the first 10 weeks of pregnancy, permanent. Approval in the French Senate was expected to happen without debate. The vote came days before the scheduled expiration of a five-year period that had been approved for test purposes in 1974.
- The Wall, a rock opera and concept album by Pink Floyd, went on sale for the first time.
- Sugar Ray Leonard won the World Boxing Council (WBC) welterweight championship by knocking out title holder Wilfred Benítez only six seconds before the final bell of the 15th round in their bout in Las Vegas. The last moment knockout was a moot point, in that all three judges keeping score had Leonard ahead of Benitez on points.
- Born:
  - Diego Klattenhoff Canadian TV actor known for The Blacklist
  - Andrés Nocioni, Argentine-born professional basketball player; in Santa Fe, Argentina
- Died: Zeppo Marx (stage name for Herbert M. Marx), 78, the last surviving member of the Marx Brothers comedy team.
