= Market Daily =

Economic newspaper in Beijing, China

- Format: Broadsheet
- Owner: People's Daily
- Publisher: People's Daily
- Founded: October 1, 1979
- Ceased publication: April 2009 (print)
- Language: Chinese
- Headquarters: Beijing
- Website: www.marketdaily.com.cn

The Market Daily (simplified Chinese: 市场报; traditional Chinese: 市場報), also translated into English as Market Newspaper or Market News or is an economic newspaper based in Beijing, sponsored and owned by the People's Daily.

Market Daily was launched on October 1, 1979, after receiving approval from the Secretariat of the Chinese Communist Party. It is the first economic newspaper launched after the reform and opening up.

In April 2009, print version of Market Daily was discontinued. On June 1, its digital edition was launched. Currently, the newspaper is only available in digital newsletter format.
