= The Benji Hillman Foundation =

Charity supporting lone soldiers in Israel

- Abbreviation: BHF
- Formation: August 2006; 19 years ago
- Founded at: Israel
- Type: Charitable organization
- Purpose: Support for lone soldiers in the Israel Defense Forces and helping young immigrants integrate into Israeli society
- Headquarters: Ra'anana, Israel
- Services: Housing, guidance, and support for lone soldiers and assistance to young immigrant adults

The Benji Hillman Foundation (BHF) was founded in August 2006, in memory of Major Benji Hillman, who was killed in action during the 2006 Lebanon War. The Foundation's aims are to help lone soldiers and soldiers from deprived backgrounds in the Israel Defense Force, both during and after their army service. The foundation also helps young adults who are immigrants to integrate into society.

The foundation is named after the late Major Benji Hillman (1979–2006), a company commander in the elite Egoz Reconnaissance Unit, who was killed in Maroun al-Ras on 20 July leading his troops into battle. Hillman was regarded as having an unstinting sense of responsibility toward the soldiers under his command, particularly to lone soldiers.

Benji was born on 3 October 1979 in North West London to Judith and Danny Hillman. He had an older sister, Abigail and younger brother Shimon. His family emigrated to Israel in 1983 to Ra'anana. He attended the local primary school and then went to the Mechina in Kfar Saba and subsequently to the Midrashiya in Pardes Hanna. He also spent a year at Bnei David, the pre-military Yeshiva in Eli.

In 1998, he entered the army and was accepted to the Egoz Reconnaissance Unit. He was named outstanding soldier in basic training and in combat courses following. In 2000, he graduated from the officers' course with distinction and held positions in both Egoz and in the Golani Brigade's 51st Battalion. In June 2006, less than a month before he was killed, he married his long-time girlfriend Ayala Borger.

== Projects ==
The Foundation, managed by Benji's family and friends, is implementing a number of projects to make the lives of lone soldiers more comfortable during their service, and to help young immigrants integrate into Israeli society.

"Lone soldiers" are young men and women, usually recent immigrants to Israel who are undertaking their mandatory service in the Israeli army. Lone soldiers often have no family in Israel, may barely speak the Hebrew language and in most cases have no place of their own to go when on leave from their army service.

The Foundation's flagship project, HaBayit Shel Benji (Benji's Home), was opened in February 2013 in Raanana to provide general assistance, their own room, good food, a surrogate family (from members of local community - Raanana) and all the comforts of home for 50 lone soldiers (male and female). In 2016 a fourth floor with additional rooms was added to the Home.

The second project, opened in 2014 is a Guidance Center for young people after their service and beginning their lives in Israel. Each participant is given a guidance program based on their specific needs. In 2025 the center helped over 500 young people integrate into Israeli society.
