= Philip Monaghan =

American painter

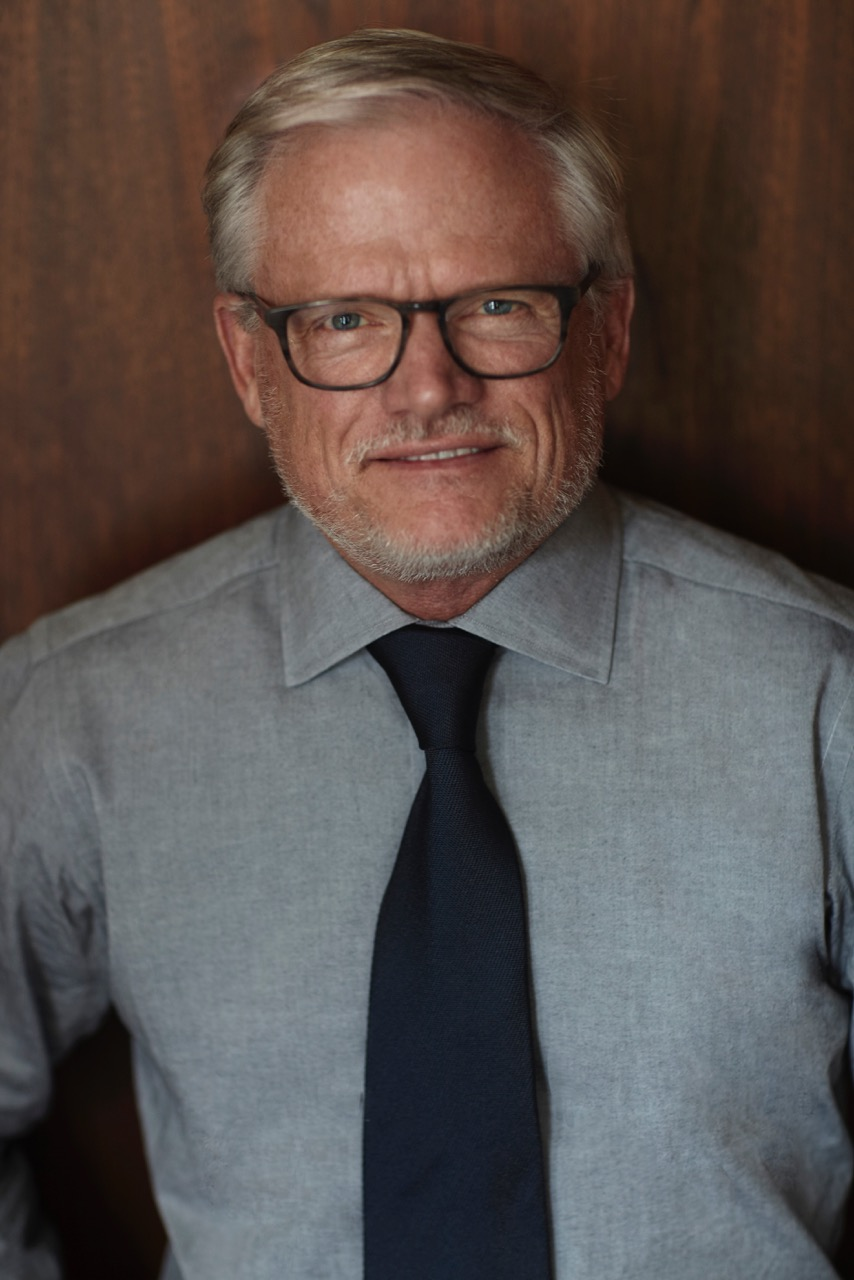
July 2015

Philip Monaghan (born September 27, 1954) is a visual artist and branding executive living in New York City. He is noted for his visual collaborations with poets. Part of the 1980s East Village fashion and art scene, Monaghan was friendly with artists including Andy Warhol. Concurrently, Monaghan worked as an art director and branding expert for various retail companies. In 2007, he dedicated himself to a fine arts practice.

== Early life and college ==
Philip Monaghan was born in Rockville Centre, New York and raised in the suburbs of New York City and Houston, Texas. He attended Memorial High School in Houston and Texas Tech University in Lubbock, Texas, receiving a BFA in Studio Art in 1976. In 1977, he moved to New York City to attend Pratt Institute in Brooklyn where he received an MFA in Studio Art in 1979.

== Professional career ==
Monaghan worked as a freelance art director in New York and Milan. He was Art Director for Fiorucci where he collaborated with Antonio Lopez, Francesco Scavullo and Andy Warhol on live windows and events in-store. During this time, he was in a relationship and later a friendship with poet Tim Dlugos. It was also during this time that he performed at various venues with Joey Arias and Ann Magnuson. From 1986, Monaghan held a variety of posts at L Brands, involved in brand positioning and creative direction for Express, Bath & Body Works, Henri Bendel and New York & Company. He retired in 2001.

== Painting career ==
In 2011, Fales Library at New York University mounted an exhibition of Monaghan's paintings titled "At Moments Like These He Feels Farthest Away," a visual response to Tim Dlugos's poem "Gilligan's Island." The exhibition was reviewed by Holland Cotter of The New York Times. In 2015, Landmark Arts at Texas Tech University Lubbock mounted an exhibition of Monaghan's paintings titled “Why Are You Doing This To Me?” which is a visual response to David Trinidad's poem "The Late Show". The exhibition traveled to Fales Library at New York University in 2016.

In June 2013, Monaghan's Andrew Geller-designed beach house in Fire Island Pines was published by Elle Decoration UK and in 2014 in Mid Century Modern Complete by Dominic Bradbury. Monaghan also appears in Modern Tide: Mid-Century Architecture On Long Island, 2013.
