= June 1979 =

Month of 1979

<<	June 1979					>>
Su	Mo	Tu	We	Th	Fr	Sa
					1	2
3	4	5	6	7	8	9
10	11	12	13	14	15	16
17	18	19	20	21	22	23
24	25	26	27	28	29	30

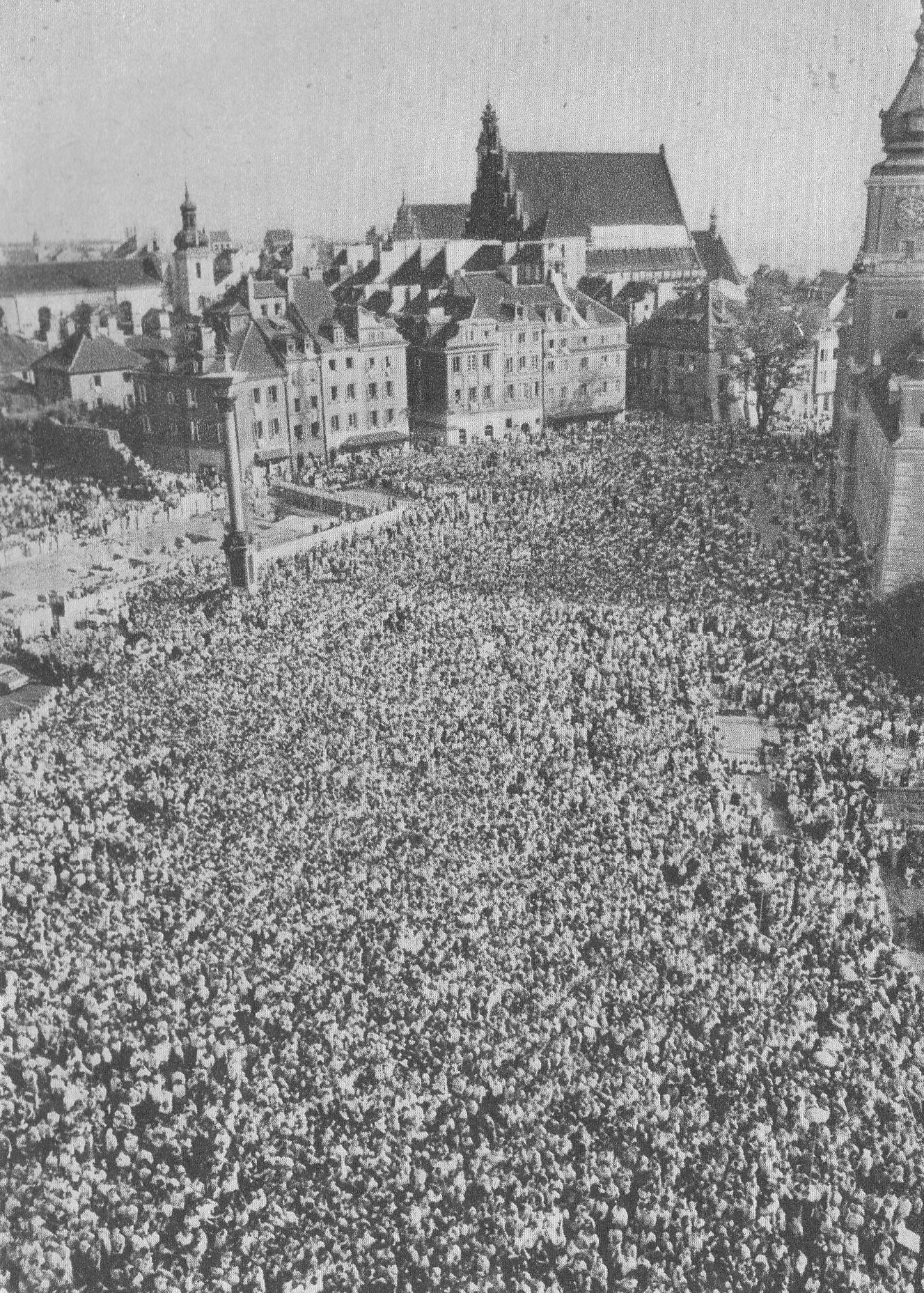
June 3, 1979: Pope John Paul II holds first Mass in a Communist nation

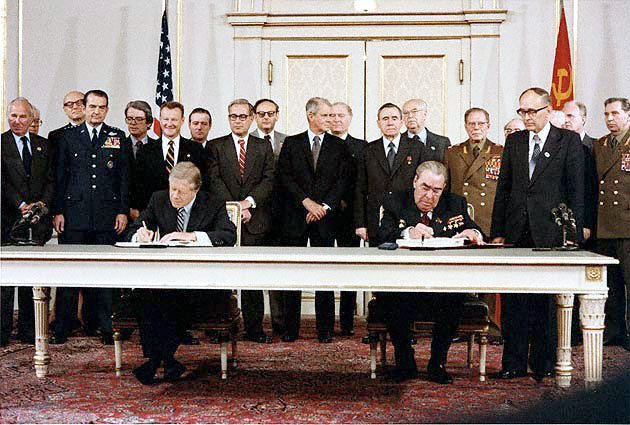
June 18, 1979: U.S. President Carter and Soviet leader Brezhnev sign the SALT II treaty in Vienna

The following events occurred in June 1979:

== June 1, 1979 (Friday) ==
Rhodesia flag (1965–1979)

Zimbabwe Rhodesia flag (1979)

Zimbabwe (1980–present)

- The Republic of "Zimbabwe Rhodesia" was proclaimed, with the first black-led government of the former Rhodesia, which had been ruled by the white minority for 90 years. Abel Muzorewa, a Methodist Bishop and black African, became the Prime Minister while the white Rhodesian former Prime Minister, Ian Smith, served as the third most senior official as Minister of Portfolio.
- The Seattle SuperSonics won the NBA Championship against the Washington Bullets, winning 97 to 93 to win the best-4-of-7 series, four games to one.
- Born:
  - Markus Persson, Swedish video game programmer and co-creator of the Minecraft game; in Stockholm
  - Rhea Santos, Philippine and Canadian TV news anchor; in San Mateo, Rizal
- Died:
  - Werner Forssmann, 74, German physician and 1956 Nobel Prize in Medicine winner who developed the cardiac catheterization procedure
  - Ján Kadár, 61, Slovak filmmaker and Academy Award winner
  - Jack Mulhall, 91, American film actor who appeared in 430 films over fifty years
  - Eric Partridge, 85, New Zealand-born British lexicographer and expert on slang.

== June 2, 1979 (Saturday) ==
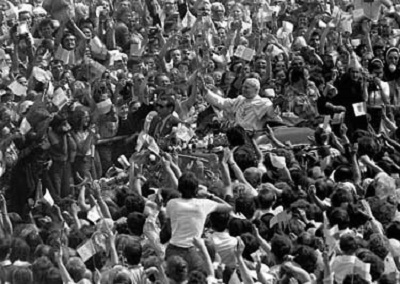
The Pope at Warsaw's Victory Square

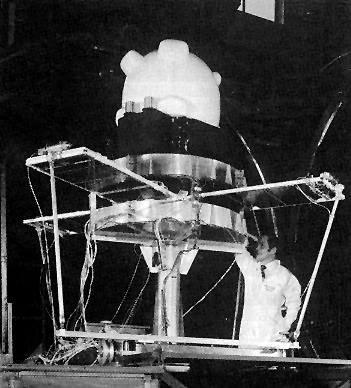
Last of the UK's Ariel satellites

- Pope John Paul II arrived in his native Poland on his first official, nine-day stay, becoming the first Pope to visit a Communist country. The former Archbishop of Krakow landed at the Warsaw airport at 10:05 a.m. where he was welcomed by a crowd of 20,000 and was cheered by hundreds of thousands of supporters who lined the route of his motorcade, before holding a nationally televised mass at Victory Square before a crowd of 200,000. Officially, the occasion for the visit by Karol Wojtyla, who had become Pope less than a year earlier, was the 900th anniversary of the martyrdom of Saint Stanislaus of Szczepanów, who had been killed by King Boleslaw II of Poland on April 11, 1079. The visit, later known as "nine days that changed the world", would bring about the solidarity of the Polish people against Communism, ultimately leading to the rise of the Solidarity movement.
- Ariel 6, the last of the British Ariel satellite program, was launched from the United States Wallops Island launch site. On April 26, 1962, Ariel 1 had been the first British satellite.
- Twenty people were killed near Samcheok in South Korea, and more were injured, after the bus they were in toppled over a cliff after colliding with a truck.
- Born:
  - Choirul Huda, Indonesian soccer football goalkeeper known for being fatally injured during a Liga 1 game; in Lamongan, East Java (d. 2017)
  - Morena Baccarin, Brazilian-born U.S. TV actress and Emmy Award nominee; in Rio de Janeiro
- Died:
  - Jim Hutton, 45, American film and television actor known for the title role in the Ellery Queen, TV detective series
  - P. V. H. Weems, 90, U.S. Navy officer, inventor and navigational expert who invented the Weems Plotter and the Second Setting Watch, and founded the Weems School of Navigation.

== June 3, 1979 (Sunday) ==
- A blowout at the Ixtoc I oil well in the southern Gulf of Mexico caused at least 600,000 tons (130 million U.S. gallons) of oil to be spilled into the waters until it was brought under control on March 23, 1980. The disaster would be the largest accidental oil spill in history until it was surpassed by the Deepwater Horizon oil spill in 2010.
- Parliamentary voting was held in Italy for the 630-seat Chamber of Deputies and the 315-seat Senate of the Republic. The Democrazia Cristiana Party continued its plurality in both houses (262 in the Chamber and 138 in the Senate) and Prime Minister Giulio Andreotti formed a new government.
- The Uganda–Tanzania War, which had started on October 9, 1978, came to an end as the Tanzania People's Defence Force secured Uganda's western border to prevent the supporters of Idi Amin from attempting a counterinvasion.
- Mohamed Mahmoud Ould Louly became the new President of Mauritania after the ruling Military Committee for National Salvation decided to replace President Mustafa Ould Salek. A former Mauritanian Army officer, Colonel Salek had led the bloodless coup that had overthrown President Moktar Ould Daddah on July 10, 1978.
- Fifty-two people were burned to death in Thailand, and 11 seriously injured, when a bus crowded with 68 partygoers collided head-on with a fully loaded gasoline truck on a mountain road in Phang Nga Province
- Born:
  - Pierre Poilievre, Canadian politician, Leader of the Opposition, in Calgary
  - Tábata Jalil, Mexican TV hostess; in Mexico City
- Died: Arno Schmidt, 65, German author

== June 4, 1979 (Monday) ==
- Flight Lieutenant Jerry Rawlings took power in the West African nation of Ghana in a military coup d'état, overthrowing General Fred Akuffo and ending the rule of the Supreme Military Council. Ghana Army Major General Neville Alexander Odartey-Wellington, Chief of Staff of the Army, died during the defense of the Council headquarters. Most of the members of the council, including four former heads of state, would be executed in the next few weeks.
- South Africa's State President and former Prime Minister, John Vorster, resigned after being accused by a government board of inquiry of attempting to cover up the "Muldergate" scandal and perjury in his testimony to the board. Vorster was replaced in the largely ceremonial position by Marais Viljoen, the president of the South African Senate.
- Joe Clark took office as Canada's 16th and youngest Prime Minister at the age 39, the day before his 40th birthday.
- Iran reversed its agreement to receive a new U.S. Ambassador, rejecting career diplomat Walter L. Cutler. The post had been vacant since the April 6 resignation of William H. Sullivan. With Cutler's rejection by the Iranian government, and the refusal by the U.S. Department of State to nominate a different diplomat, U.S. Embassy chargé d'affaires Bruce Laingen remained the senior U.S. official in Iran. The Iranian Foreign Minister later stated that Cutler had been refused because of American intervention in African politics when Cutler had been the Ambassador to Zaire.
- The roof of Kemper Arena, the 19,500 sports facility for the NBA's Kansas City Kings and the site of the 1976 Republican National Convention less than three years earlier, collapsed in a storm at 6:45 p.m. Fortunately, no events were scheduled at the time, and the most recent event had been a week earlier, a Memorial Day concert by the Village People. Coincidentally, the American Institute of Architects was holding its national convention in Kansas City the same day, at Bartle Hall at the Kansas City Convention Center half a mile away.
- The song "Tusk" was recorded by Fleetwood Mac along with the 112-member University of Southern California Marching Band, setting a record for the most musicians on a rock music single.
- Born: Hanieh Tavassoli, Iranian film actress, in Hamedan
- Died:
  - Hans Mauch, 60, Swiss ice skater and slapstick comedian who was "Frack" in the famous Ice Follies duo of Frick and Frack.
  - Gilda de Abreu, 74, Brazilian actress and film director
  - Seamus O'Donovan, 82, Irish Republican Army explosives expert and Nazi collaborator.

== June 5, 1979 (Tuesday) ==
- Sandinista National Liberation Front guerrillas captured León, Nicaragua's second-largest city as the Guardia Nacional abandoned the barracks. More provinces fell to the Sandinist National Liberation Front as Nicaraguan President Anastasio Somoza Debayle declared a national siege, with rebel rule in the departamentos of Matagalpa, Ocotal and Chichigalpa in the north, Diriamba and Granada in the south, and Masaya near the capital.
- The University of Rio de Janeiro was founded. Officially referred to as the "Federal University of the State of Rio de Janeiro", it is commonly known as "Unirio".
- Died: Heinz Erhardt, 70, West German comedian and radio and TV actor

== June 6, 1979 (Wednesday) ==
- The Kola Superdeep Borehole broke the world record for greatest depth drilled into the Earth, reaching 31,441 feet (9,583 m) to break the mark set in the U.S. in 1974 by the "Bertha Rogers hole" in Washita County, Oklahoma. Drilling would cease in 1989 at a depth of 40,230 feet (12,260 m) which has not been exceeded since.
- Twelve days after the May 25 crash of American Airlines Flight 191, a McDonnell Douglas DC-10 jumbo jet, had killed all 271 people on board in the worst single airplane crash in U.S. history, the Federal Aviation Administration suspended the flight certification of all 138 of the McDonnell-Douglas DC-10 jumbo jets operating in the United States. An inspection of other DC-10s after the disaster had shown that a large number of the DC-10s had the same defect in their engine mountings that had led one of the three jet engines of Flight 191 to drop from the aircraft during takeoff. While there were 143 more DC-10 jets being operated by airlines outside the U.S., virtually all had been grounded voluntarily by foreign airlines. On June 19, the DC-10 jets began returning to the air in most European nations, as a Martinair DC-10 departed Zurich to take vacationers to Mallorca, followed by a Swissair flight to Tel Aviv
- The 200th annual Epsom Derby, the horse race with the largest purse, at the time, in Europe and in the United Kingdom, took place at Epsom Downs in Surrey. With a prize of £153,980 the race won by the Irish-bred and British-trained thoroughbred Troy, ridden by Willie Carson.
- The 20,030 foot (6,110 m) high Kalabaland Dhura mountain in the Himalayas, located in India, was climbed for the first time. The ascent of the Chiring We peak was made by a team of three mountaineers, Harish Kapadia, Vijay Kothari and Lakhpa Tsering.
- Born:
  - Randa Abdel-Fattah, prolific Australian novelist; in Sydney
  - Shanda Sharer, American murder victim, known for her brutal murder by fellow students; in Pineville, Kentucky (d. 1992)

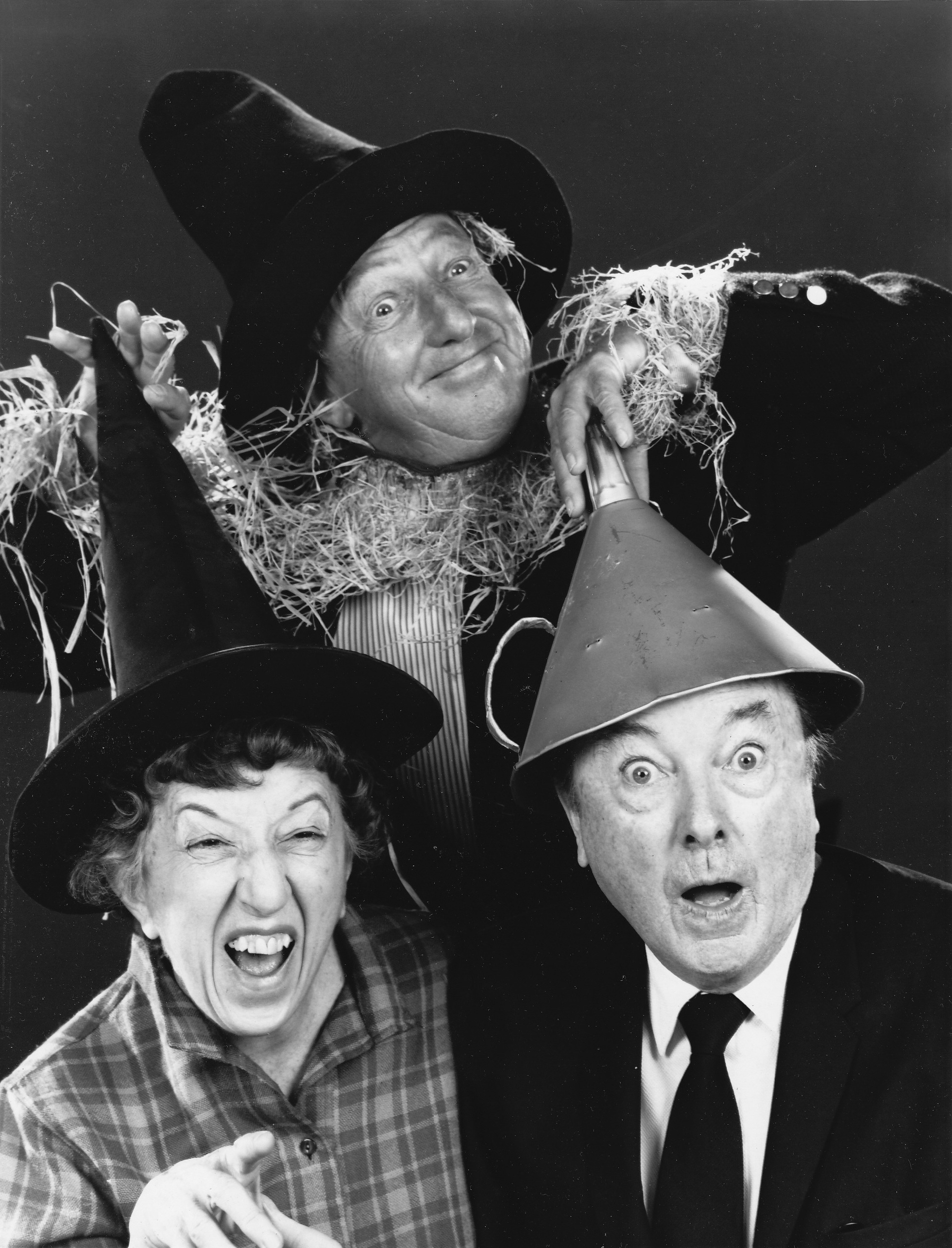
Haley, with Ray Bolger and Margaret Hamilton 30 years after 'Oz'

- Died:
  - Jack Haley, 81, American film actor best known for portraying the Tin Woodman in The Wizard of Oz
  - Ion Idriess, 89, prolific Australian novelist
  - Babu Rajab Ali, 84, Pakistani poet notable for his compositions and performance of the Kavishari sung verse.

== June 7, 1979 (Thursday) ==
- The first direct elections to the European Parliament began, allowing citizens from across all nine (at that time) member states of the European Union to elect 410 MEPs in the first international election in history. Voting in the nine European Community nations was staggered over four days, based on national preference for the day of the week for voting, and the first votes took place in Ireland, the Netherlands and the United Kingdom.
- India's second orbiting satellite, Bhaskara-I, was launched from the Soviet Union as part of its Intercosmos program to gather Earth observation data. The Indian Space Research Organisation (ISRO) had launched the first satellite designed and built in India, Aryabhata, on April 19, 1975; Bhaskara-I orbited earth for 10 years and re-entered the atmosphere in 1989.
- Egypt conducted its first multiparty parliamentary elections since 1952, when the monarchy was abolished and a republic was established. President Anwar Sadat's ruling National Democratic Party won all but 45 of the 392 seats.
- Born: Anna Torv, award-winning Australian TV actress; in Melbourne
- Died:
  - Yehudit Harari, 93, Belarusan-born Israeli educator and one of the co-founders (in 1909) of Tel Aviv
  - Forrest Carter, 53, American white supremacist and Western novelist best known for Gone to Texas, which became the basis for the film The Outlaw Josey Wales; from a heart attack Weeks later, a newspaper reporter's story that was picked up by the Associated Press concluded that Forrest Carter was Asa Carter, a fervent Alabama segregationist who had last been in the news in 1972, and that Carter's death had been ruled by a coroner as having been caused by choking to death "after being in a fistfight at a relative's home".

== June 8, 1979 (Friday) ==
- Motorcycle speedway competitor Vic Harding of the Hackney Hawks was killed, and Steve Weatherley of the Eastbourne Eagles was permanently paralyzed, when the two collided during a competition at the Hackney Wick Stadium in greater London.
- Died:
  - Wehrmacht Lieutenant General Reinhard Gehlen, 77, German military officer, founder of the Gehlen Organization intelligence agency after World War II that eventually became West Germany's Bundesnachrichtendienst (BRD) spy agency.
  - C. S. Bull, 83, American unit still photographer who created most of the publicity photos for the MGM studios from the 1920s thorough the 1950s.

== June 9, 1979 (Saturday) ==
- Six students and one adult were killed in a fire at Luna Park in Sydney, Australia, while riding one of the attractions, the "Ghost Train". The ride had gone into a tunnel with 35 people on board, and came out with only 28.
- The Rhodesian Security Forces invaded neighboring Mozambique to attack an encampment of the Zimbabwe African National Liberation Army guerrillas, killing 30 of the ZANLA forces in their first military engagement since majority black African rule began in Zimbabwe Rhodesia.
- The Dobani Peak mountain in Pakistan, 20,154 feet (6,143 m) high, was climbed for the first time in history, conquered by Japanese mountaineers Isao Ikeuchi and Masaru Hashimoto.
- Hamburger SV won the championship of the 1978–79 Bundesliga on the final day of the season, finishing one point ahead of VfB Stuttgart on the strength of 21 wins and 7 draws to the 20 wins and 8 draws of Stuttgart.
- Sepp Maier, goalkeeper for Bayern Munich and for the West German national team, appeared in his 442nd consecutive soccer football match, closing out a 17-season career on the final day of the 1978-79 Bundesliga season. In all, Maier played in 599 matches, and had not missed a game since August 20, 1966. Maier was seriously injured in an auto accident the following month.
- The Canada national cricket team, founded in 1968, played its first ever One Day International match, as part of the 1979 ICC Trophy competition, facing Pakistan at the Headingley Cricket Ground in England.
- Panionios F.C. won the Greek Cup in soccer football, 3 to 1, over AEK Athens before 20,000 fans at Piraeus.
- Died:
  - Frederick "Cyclone" Taylor, 94, Canadian ice hockey star and inductee to the Hockey Hall of Fame
  - Scott Garland, 27, Canadian NHL ice hockey centre for the Los Angeles Kings, was killed in a single car accident in Montreal.

== June 10, 1979 (Sunday) ==
- Voting concluded in the 10 nations participating in the first direct elections for the European Parliament as voters in France, Italy, West Germany, Belgium and Luxembourg cast their ballots; previously, each nation's parliaments selected the representatives. The Christian Democrat parties in Germany, Italy, the Netherlands and Belgium won 108 of the 410 seats, and Britain's Conservative Party was the largest single vote-getter with 60 seats. Among the representatives elected was the former Crown Prince of Austria-Hungary, Otto von Hapsburg.
- The first championship of Australia's professional basketball association, the National Basketball League (NBL), was won by the St Kilda Saints of Melbourne, who defeated the Canberra Cannons by a single point in NBL Grand Final game at Melbourne, 94 to 93.
- Born: Lee Brice (Kenneth Mobley Brice Jr.), American country music singer; in Sumter, South Carolina

== June 11, 1979 (Monday) ==
- The most distant volcanic eruption ever observed by humans took place on Io, one of the moons of the planet Jupiter, as the Surt volcano was photographed by the Voyager 1 space probe as it displaced lava and sent the images back to the planet Earth.
- In what was only the third successful hijacking of an American airliner since strict security measures had been enacted at the end of 1972, Delta Air Lines Flight 1061, a jet with 195 passengers and a crew of 12 was seized while en route to Fort Lauderdale, Florida from New York City. The Lockheed L-1011 TriStar jet was diverted at 7:07 in the evening about 90 miles east of Charleston, South Carolina and landed in Cuba at the Havana airport at 8:34. The hijacker, former Cuban Air Force pilot Eduardo Guerra Jimenez, had defected to the U.S. on October 5, 1969, when he landed a MiG-17 at Homestead Air Force Base near Miami.

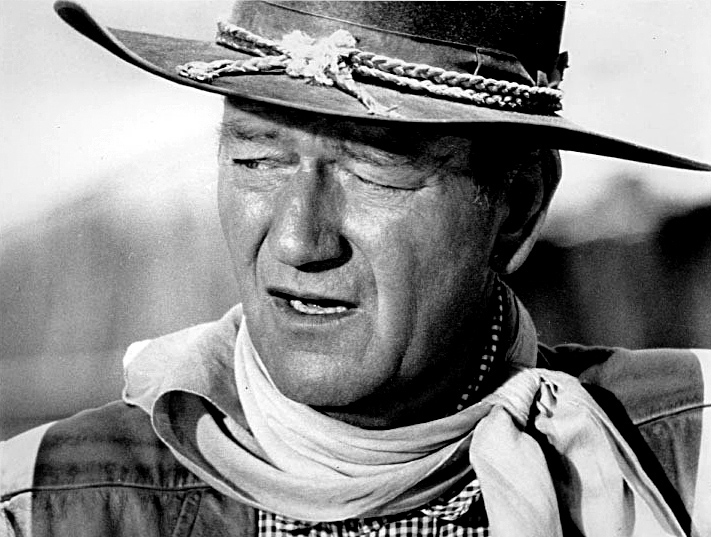
John Wayne

- Born: Olaf Schmid, British Army bomb defuser; in Truro (killed 2009)
- Died:
  - John Wayne, 72, (stage name for Marion Morrison), popular American film actor, died of stomach cancer
  - Loren Murchison, 80, American Olympic athlete and member of the 4 × 100 m relay team that won gold medals in 1920 and 1924

== June 12, 1979 (Tuesday) ==
- The Army of Thailand forcibly repatriated 42,000 refugees who had fled from Cambodia during the 1978 invasion by the Vietnamese Army and who were being held at the Nong Chan Refugee Camp. On orders of General Kriangsak Chomanan, the embassies of the United States, France and Australia were given three hours to select 1,200 refugees for their own countries, and the remaining Cambodians were then taken by bus to the Buddhist temple at Preah Vihear, located on a 1,720 foot (520 m) high cliff overlooking the border with Cambodia, and forced to make their way down the mountain side and across a minefield. According to the United Nations High Commissioner for Refugees, at least 3,000 Cambodians died as they were being forced out of Thailand.
- Using the Gossamer Albatross, Bryan Allen became the first person to fly a pedal-powered aircraft across the English Channel, winning the £100,000 ($205,000 at the time) Kremer prize. Allen departed Folkestone in England at 5:50 in the morning local time and landed 25 miles (40 km) away at Cap Griz-Nez in France at 8:45. The plane itself weighed only 70 pounds (32 kg) and the pilot weighed 137 pounds (62 kg).
- Born: Robyn (stage name for Robin Miriam Carlsson), Swedish pop music star and Grammy Award nominee; in Stockholm
- Died:
  - David Sibeko, 40, South African political activist and official of the Pan Africanist Congress of Azania, was shot and killed at his home in Dar es Salaam in Tanzania after getting into an argument in a dispute with members of the Second Azanian People's Liberation Army
  - Ernesto Lomasti, 19, Italian mountaineer and specialist in the sport of climbing (ascension of a peak without equipment), was killed while training with his infantry unit within the Italian armed services as a member of the Alpini. Lomasti was reportedly struck by lightning while making an ascent.

== June 13, 1979 (Wednesday) ==
- Solar One, the first crewed solar-powered aircraft, made its maiden flight, piloted by Ken Stewart after the solar cells had charged. Stewart flew the aircraft at Lasham Airfield near Hampshire in England for 1.1 kilometres (0.68 mi) at a height of 10 metres (33 ft)
- Born: Ágnes Csomor, Hungarian TV actress; in Budapest
- Died:
  - Darla Hood, 47, American child actress best known of the Our Gang film comedies, died of complications from routine surgery.
  - Sunshine Sue (stage name for Mary Higdon Workman), 66, American country music singer and one of the first women to host a national network radio program, the Old Dominion Barn Dance.

== June 14, 1979 (Thursday) ==
- Air France Flight 54, a Concorde airliner with 81 people aboard, suffered a blowout of two tires while attempting a takeoff from Dulles International Airport in Washington, DC and shrapnel damaged one of the four engines, punctured fuel tanks and severed hydraulic lines and wires. After the control tower informed Flight 54 that two of its tires on the left main landing gear had blown, the pilot made a safe landing 20 minutes later on another runway that had been prepared by fire trucks.
- Jerome Robbins's ballet Opus 19/The Dreamer, performed by the New York City Ballet company to the music of the late Sergei Prokofiev, had its world premiere, and starred Mikhail Baryshnikov and Patricia McBride as the principal dancers.
- Died: Ahmad Zahir, 33, popular Afghan singer and songwriter, was killed in an auto accident while traveling through the Salang Tunnel.

== June 15, 1979 (Friday) ==
- McDonald's introduced the Happy Meal in the United States in a nationwide advertising campaign after testing the product since February in franchises in the U.S. state of Missouri. Anticipating the June release, the Burger Chef restaurant chain had filed a lawsuit in a federal court in St. Louis, alleging that the Happy Meal was an unfair copy of Burger Chef's "Funmeal", which it had introduced for children in 1973.
- U.S. President Jimmy Carter and Soviet Communist Party First Secretary Leonid Brezhnev met for the first time after both had arrived in the Austrian capital of Vienna to sign the SALT II treaty to reduce the number of nuclear weapons to be deployed by both nations. In the afternoon, Austria's President Rudolf Kirchschläger hosted the first meeting, at the presidential residence, the Hofburg. The two leaders then attended a presentation at the Austrian State Opera of the Mozart opera Die Entführung aus dem Serail (The Abduction from the Seraglio).
- Arriba, the official daily newspaper in Spain of Francisco Franco's Falangist Party, published its final issue after an existence of 44 years.
- The ecological monster movie Prophecy, the first to establish Vancouver, British Columbia, as "Hollywood North", was released, starring Robert Foxworth and Talia Shire.
- Born:
  - Yulia Nestsiarenka, Belaursan sprinter and 2004 Olympic gold medalist in the women's 100m dash; in Brest, Byelorussian SSR, Soviet Union
  - Paradorn Srichaphan, Thailand professional tennis player and the first Asian player to be ranked in the ATP Top 10; in Khon Kaen
- Died: Teruo Nakamura, 59, Taiwanese-born Imperial Japanese Army who, in 1974, became the last soldier of World War II to surrender

== June 16, 1979 (Saturday) ==
- At least 32 Syrian Army cadets were killed and 54 wounded in a shooting attack by the Muslim Brotherhood at Aleppo. The cadets, like President Hafez al-Assad, were member of the Alawite sect of Shi'ite Muslims while the Brotherhood was composed of Sunni Muslims.
- General Ignatius K. Acheampong, who had served as President of Ghana from 1972 to 1978, was executed by a firing squad 12 days after a coup d'état led by Jerry Rawlings had overthrown General Acheampong's successor, Frederick Akuffo, and arrested most of the Ghanaian military leaders. Acheampong and the former Ghanaian Border Guard chief, Major General E. K. Utuka, were the first to be put on trial by a designated revolutionary court in the capital at Accra and both were executed after being convicted of "using their positions to amass wealth while in office and recklessly dissipating state funds to the detriment of the country."
- FC Nantes defeated AJ Auxerre, 4 to 1, to win the Coupe de France soccer football championship.
- Born: Emmanuel Moire, French singer-songwriter, in Le Mans
- Died:
  - Nicholas Ray, 67, American film director known for Rebel Without a Cause
  - Liselotte Welskopf-Henrich, 77, West German novelist

== June 17, 1979 (Sunday) ==
- The government of Malaysia forcibly expelled 2,500 Vietnamese refugees by loading them onto five boats, none considered seaworthy, towed them out to international waters and abandoned them.
- Hale Irwin won golf's U.S. Open tournament at Toledo, Ohio, finishing two strokes ahead of Gary Player and Jerry Pate. A sportswriter for The New York Times commented that, although the final day was "one of the sloppiest final rounds they had played in recent years... everyone else played as poorly as he did.
- At Rochester, New York, golfer Jane Blalock won the Ladies Professional Golf Association title.
- The sport of truck racing began in the United States at an event held at the Atlanta International Raceway by ATRA, the American Truck Racing Association, founded by promoter Jim Donoho. The inaugural race condemned by the National Highway Traffic Safety Administration (NHTSA), which had sent a telegram urging Donahoo to call off the race, as well as by Goodyear Tire, General Motors, Cooper Tires, the American Trucking Association, the Motor Vehicle Manufacturers Association, and by Heavy Duty Trucking magazine, because none of the competitors had racing experience, the use of non-racing tires, and the size of the vehicles. Mike "Ro-HoA" Adams finished first among 30 competitors in the inaugural 200 miles (320 km) race (billed as the "Bobtail 200") in his rebuilt, 20-wheel, 1965 GMC truck, in front of 18,500 spectators.

== June 18, 1979 (Monday) ==
- U.S. President Jimmy Carter and U.S.S.R. leader Leonid Brezhnev signed the SALT II agreement in Vienna. According to U.S. officials, Communist Party leader Brezhnev, "leader of a country where atheism is the rule," surprised Carter by telling him "God will not forgive us if we fail." A Soviet spokesman, Leonid Zamyatin, told a press conference that Brezhnev had actually said 'Future generations will not forgive us if we fail.' After the invasion of Afghanistan by the Soviet Union in December, Carter would halt further proceedings on Senate ratification of the treaty on January 3, 1980, and SALT II would never take effect.
- The first round of voting was held in presidential and parliamentary elections in Ghana that took place as scheduled even after Jerry Rawlings had overthrown the government of the West African nation. Hilla Limann and Victor Owusu were the top two finishers in the first round of presidential voting, with 35% and 30% of the vote, respectively, and since neither had a majority, a runoff election was held on July 9. Voting was also held for the 140 seats of the Parliament of Ghana, with candidates of Limann's People's National Party taking an early lead in the first round.
- Under the leadership of the Conservative government of Prime Minister Thatcher, the United Kingdom revised the Value Added Tax on sales of classified goods, setting a single rate of 15% on all sales.

== June 19, 1979 (Tuesday) ==
- Voting along party lines, a joint session of the Parliament of South Africa elected Senate President (and National Party nominee) Marais Viljoen to the ceremonial position of State President of South Africa. Viljoens, by a margin of 155 to 23, defeated United Party leader De Villiers Graaff.
- Yes-no voting was held in the West African nation of Mali for President Moussa Traoré and for the 82 candidates of the Democratic Union of the Malian People, the nation's lone legal political party.

== June 20, 1979 (Wednesday) ==
- A Nicaraguan National Guard soldier killed ABC TV news correspondent Bill Stewart and his interpreter Juan Espinosa. Both Stewart and Espinosa complied with orders from a guardsman to lie face down, and then both were shot by a rifle at point-blank range. Other members of the news crew captured the murder on tape. Corporal Lorenzo Brenes was arrested the next day after being identified as the gunman, but the killing of the American newsman ended any chance of U.S. support of the regime of Anastasio Somoza Debayle as Secretary of State Cyrus Vance called for Somoza to step down and for the Organization of American States (OAS) to send an international peace force to maintain order.
- Ugandan President Yusufu Lule resigned after less than 10 weeks in office after a vote of no confidence by the National Consultative Council that had been installed as the new government following the Uganda-Tanzania War. Former Ugandan Attorney General Godfrey Binaisa was appointed as the new President of Uganda and would serve until May 12, 1980.
- American Airlines Flight 293, a Boeing 727 flight from New York to Chicago, was hijacked by a Serbian Yugoslavian terrorist, Nikola Kavaja, who was out on bail during the appeal of his conviction for bombing the home of the Yugoslav consul in Chicago. Kavaja released the passengers and most of the crew, forced the jet to return to New York City, and then successfully demanded a Boeing 707 to fly him to Ireland, where he surrendered.

== June 21, 1979 (Thursday) ==
- The first Prime Minister of Dominica, Patrick John, was removed from office by vote of the House of Assembly after only seven months in office. He was replaced by Communications Minister Oliver Seraphin. Prime Minister John refused to step down, in that the Assembly had not followed the procedure of first having a vote of no confidence in the government but yielded by the end of the month.
- The U.S. Consumer Products Safety Commission voted to turn down a petition to ban the further manufacture and sale of skateboards after a consumer safety advocacy group cited 140,000 skateboard accidents reported by physicians during 1977. At the time, there were an estimated 20 million skateboards in use in the U.S.; the commission's Chairman, Susan B. King, said in a statement that the injuries "had resulted mainly because of how skateboards were used, rather than how manufacturers built them."
- The gravesite of Korean Christian evangelist Yi Byeok, founder of Korea's Roman Catholic community, was discovered by chance in Gyeonggi Province almost 200 years after his martyrdom.
- The cricket teams of Sri Lanka and Canada met in the final of the first-ever ICC Trophy, sponsored by the International Cricket Conference to qualify the best two of the ICC's 16 associate members for the Cricket World Cup. The other six spots in the 8-team tournament were occupied by the ICC's full members (Australia, England, India, New Zealand, Pakistan and the West Indies). At the final played in England at Worcester, Sri Lanka won by scoring 324 runs against Canada's 264. Both teams qualified for the seventh and eighth seed of the World Cup tournament.
- Born: Chris Pratt, American TV actor; in Virginia, Minnesota
- Died: Elias IV of Antioch, 64, Patriarch of the Greek Orthodox Church of Antioch and All The East since 1970

== June 22, 1979 (Friday) ==
- The Home Depot chain of superstores for home improvement, began operations with the opening of two stores near Atlanta, in Doraville, Georgia and Decatur, Georgia.
- The Soviet Union's Baikal–Amur Mainline (BAM) neared completion as two railroad construction crews, one working from the east and the other from the west, met to join the two segments of the original 2,000 mi (3,200 km) long railway designed to cross most of the Russian SFSR and relieve traffic on the existing Trans-Siberian Railway.
- Jeremy Thorpe, the former leader of the United Kingdom's Liberal Party, which had the third highest number of MPs in the House of Commons, was acquitted by a jury along with three other defendants on all charges of conspiring to attempt the assassination of a former friend, Norman Scott. The "Thorpe affair", however, ended his career as a Member of Parliament and as Liberal Party leader, after Scott testified in detail about a homosexual relationship he had had with Thorpe in the early 1960s.
- The Professional Football Researchers Association, football's counterpart to the Society for American Baseball Research (SABR), was founded.
- Born: Joey Cheek, American speed skater and 2006 Olympic gold medalist; in Greensboro, North Carolina
- Died: G. S. Adair, 82, British biochemist

== June 23, 1979 (Saturday) ==
- Thousands of protesters in Afghanistan rioted in an insurrection against the pro-Communist government of Nur Mohammad Taraki. The rebellion began in Kabul's Chindawol District after the arrest of Shia Muslim leaders, captured the police precinct station and its arsenal of weapons. The rebellion was suppressed by the next day, and people in Chindawol were arrested, and an unknown number executed. In the first 20 months of rule by Taraki and his successor, Hafizullah Amin, at least 4,785 arrestees were killed.
- Fortuna Düsseldorf defeated Hertha BSC, 1 to 0, in extra time to win the DFB-Pokal West German championship at Hanover. Wolfgang Seel scored in the 116th minute for the winning goal.
- Born:
  - LaDainian Tomlinson, American NFL football running back and Pro Football Hall of Fame enshrinee; in Rosebud, Texas
  - Yosvani Ramos, Cuban-born ballet dancer and principal dancer for four ballet companies; in Camagüey
  - Marilyn Agliotti, South African-born Netherlands field hockey player and Olympic gold medalist; in Boksburg

== June 24, 1979 (Sunday) ==
- The Permanent Peoples' Tribunal, an international opinion tribunal, was founded in Italy in Bologna at the initiative of the late Senator Lelio Basso (who had died six months earlier), with Francois Rigaux of Belgium as its first President.
- The Thalay Sagar mountain peak, located in India and 22,651 feet (6,904 m) high was climbed for the first time. The British-American team of Roy Kligfield, John Thackray, and Pete Thexton made the historic first ascent.
- Born:
  - Craig Shergold, English cancer patient known for receiving more greeting cards than any person in the world and subject of a persistent urban legend; in Carshalton, Surrey (d. 2020)
  - Mindy Kaling (stage name for Vera Mindy Chokalingam), American TV actress; in Cambridge, Massachusetts

== June 25, 1979 (Monday) ==
- In Casteau, located in Belgium and the location of Supreme Headquarters Allied Powers Europe (SHAPE), U.S. Army General Alexander Haig, the NATO Supreme Allied Commander, escaped an assassination attempt by the Baader-Meinhof terrorist organization. At 8:30 in the morning, General Haig was being driven to work when a remotely controlled bomb exploded underneath the street an instant after his limousine had passed the location. Haig and the three other occupants of the limo were unhurt, but three security guards in the "chase vehicle" assigned to follow Haig' car were slightly injured. At a press conference, the SHAPE commander said that it was likely that he would have been killed if the explosion of the bomb, which had the force of up to 300 pounds (140 kg) of TNT, had happened a split second sooner.
- Oliver "O. J." Seraphin was sworn in as the new Prime Minister of Dominica, to replace the recently deposed Patrick John. Seraphin, formerly the Minister of Communication, would serve for 13 months before his Labour Party's loss of control of parliament in 1980.
- Born:
  - Busy Philipps (Elizabeth Jean Philipps), American TV actress and Critics Choice award winner; in Oak Park, Illinois
  - La La Anthony, American television reality show host; as Alani Nicole Vazquez in New York City.
- Died: Dave Fleischer, 84, American animator known as the co-creator of Popeye, Betty Boop and Koko the Clown.

== June 26, 1979 (Tuesday) ==
- Twenty-eight crewmembers of the French freighter Emanuel Delmas were burned to death after the ship collided with an Italian oil tanker, the Vera Berlingieri, off of Italy's west coast.
- Pol Le Gourrierec, France's Ambassador to Pakistan was arrested and charged with espionage after attempting to enter Pakistan's nuclear facilities at the Kahuta Research Laboratories, along with the Embassy's First Secretary, Jean Forlot. The two men were beaten up after reaching a roadblock leading up to the site, with Forlot suffering a skull fracture and Ambassador Le Gourrierec having a tooth broken.
- The longest trial in South Africa's history ended after 19 months with the conviction of 16 of 18 members of the Pan Africanist Congress were convicted of attempting to overthrow the white South African government.
- An assault force of five helicopters, sent by the black African government of Zimbabwe Rhodesia, attacked suburbs of Lusaka, capital of neighboring Zambia, killing 22 people in suspected Zimbabwe African People's Union (ZAPU) houses in effort to kill ZAPU leader Joshua Nkomo.
- The James Bond film Moonraker, adapted from Ian Fleming's 1955 novel of the same name, and starring Roger Moore as Bond, had its world premiere at the Odeon Leicester Square cinema in London, with a general release in the UK the next day and in North America on Friday.
- The longest passenger liner in the world up to that time, SS France, was sold to the Norwegian shipowner Knut Utstein Kloster, who would rename it the SS Norway. The 1,132 foot (345 m) length ship had sailed from 1962 until 1974 and had been sitting in port at Le Havre.
- Born:
  - Luka (stage name for Luciana Santos de Lima), popular Brazilian singer; in Porto Alegre
  - Nanuka Zhorzholiani, Georgian TV journalist; in Tbilisi, Georgian SSR, Soviet Union
  - Ryan Tedder, American music producer and vocalist for OneRepublic; in Colorado Springs, Colorado
- Died:
  - Ghanaian Army Lieutenant Generals Fred Akuffo, 42, and Akwasi Amankwaa Afrifa, 43, both former heads of state of the West African nation of Ghana as Chairman of the National Liberation Council, were executed by a firing squad three weeks after the coup d'état led by Flight Lieutenant Jerry Rawlings, after being tried and found guilty of corruption. Afrifa ruled Ghana for 15 months from 1969 to 1970, and Akuffo for 11 months from 1978 to 1979. Afrifa had won election eight days earlier as a member of the Ghanaian Parliament. The former leaders and four cabinet members, convicted of corruption by a military tribunal, were taken to a military firing range at a beach outside of Accra for their execution.
  - Major General Robert Kotei, 43, Chief of Staff of the Ghanaian Armed Forces until June 4.
  - Colonel Roger Felli, 38, Foreign Minister of Ghana until June 5
  - Rear Admiral Joy Amedume, Chief of Staff of the Ghanaian Navy until his arrest on June 4, was shot by a firing squad.
  - Colonel George Boakye, 41, Commander of the Ghanaian Air Force until June 4.

== June 27, 1979 (Wednesday) ==
- In the first aerial combat between the air forces of Israel and Syria since the 1973 Yom Kippur War, several formations of Syrian Air Force MiG-21 jet fighters challenged Israeli Air Force (IAF) F-15 jets that were striking Palestinian camps in Lebanon near Damour and Sidon, Israel reported that it had shot down at least five Syrian jets and although Syria conceded losing four, it asserted that it had downed four IAF fighters. The last clash between the two nations had been on April 29, 1974, when six Syrian planes were downed in the Golan Heights.
- Born: Kim Gyu-ri, South Korean film and television actress; in Seoul

== June 28, 1979 (Thursday) ==
- Greece became the tenth member of the European Economic Community (EEC) as the Hellenic Parliament voted to ratify the Treaty of Accession 1979. The treaty, signed on May 28, made Greece the first new member since 1973 of the "Common Market", a predecessor to the European Union. Of 300 deputies of the Boule, 193 voted in favor, three abstained, and the other 104 declined to attend the session at all.
- At a meeting in Geneva of the Organization of Petroleum Exporting Countries (OPEC), the representatives of the 13 OPEC nations voted to increase the price of a barrel of oil by 16 percent, to as high as $23.50 a barrel. Since the beginning of 1979, the price of oil had increased by almost 50 percent from $15.50.
- East Germany's Deputy Prime Minister, Kurt Fichtner was fired along with the Minister for Coal and Energy, Klaus Siebold, in a move approved by the nation's ruling Socialist Unity Party. Their dismissals came days after the government announced that the prices to be charged for energy would be increased by 30 percent for the 1980 winter. Siebold had signed off on shutdowns of electrical power plants for maintenance during one of the coldest winters in the Communist nation's history, and Fichtner's purchasing decisions had left the large power stations with only a one-day reserve of coal on the day before the cold wave struck.
- Died: Philippe Cousteau, 37, French oceanographer, cinematographer and co-producer of sea expedition documentary films with his father Jacques Cousteau, was killed in the crash of a seaplane near Lisbon, where the Cousteaus were on a filming expedition.

== June 29, 1979 (Friday) ==
- The Inter-American Court of Human Rights, located within the Organization of American States in Washington, D.C., began operations with seven judges, led by Chief Justice Rodolfo E. Piza Escalante of Costa Rica.
- The Panamanian-registered freighter Skyluck, which had housed more than 2,000 refugees from Vietnam and some from the People's Republic of China for more than four months after arriving in Hong Kong and refusing to leave, drifted out of the harbor after some of the refugees cut the anchor chain. The ship slowly sank after striking rocks on Lamma Island, and police arrested the remaining refugees.
- Brazilian mass murderer Luiz Gonzaga Pereira dos Santos killed a family of seven in the town of Princesa Isabel in the Paraíba state.
- Born:
  - Abz Love (stage name for Richard Breen), bestselling English rapper and lead vocalist for the boy band Five; in London.
  - Marleen Veldhuis, Netherlands swimmer, Olympic and world championship gold medalist who set the world record for fastest time in the 50 metre women's freestyle swim; in Borne, Overijssel
  - Artur Avila, Brazilian mathematician; in Rio de Janeiro
- Died:
  - Lowell George, 34, American musician, died of a heart attack caused by an adverse reaction to cocaine.
  - Jane Rose, 66, American comedienne and character actress

== June 30, 1979 (Saturday) ==
- CSD Berlin, the first annual LGBT Pride parade in Germany, took place, inspired by the annual "Christopher Street Day" celebration that started in 1970 to commemorate the first anniversary of the Stonewall riots that took place on the street of the same name in 1969.
- At 11:12 in the morning Atlanta's first subway, the Metropolitan Atlanta Rapid Transit Authority (MARTA) rapid transit train system, began operations after four years of construction.
- U.S. businessman William F. Niehous, the general manager of the Owens-Illinois Venezuela glass manufacturing factory, was rescued after more than three years as the hostage of leftist guerrillas, when city police from Ciudad Bolívar fought a gunbattle with his captors. Niehouse had been kidnapped from his home near Caracas on February 27, 1976, by masked guerrillas of a group that identified itself as the Argimiro Gabaldon Revolutionary Command.
- Valencia CF won Spain's Copa del Rey, defeating Real Madrid, 2 to 0.
- Baseball's four nation Inter-American League, founded as a high-level Triple-A minor league, played its final games, and the league folded 13 days after two of its six teams went out of business. The league had begun play on April 11 and the Miami Amigos was ahead of the second place Caracas Metropolitanos by 10 games, finishing with a record of 51 wins and 21 losses.
- Born:
  - Rick Gonzalez, American film and TV actor; in New York City
  - Matisyahu (stage name for Matthew Paul Miller), American-born Israeli rap music artist; in West Chester, Pennsylvania
  - Faisal Shahzad, Pakistani-born American terrorist convicted of a thwarted attempt to bomb Times Square in New York in 2010; in Karachi
