= July 1979 =

Month of 1979

<<	July 1979					>>
Su	Mo	Tu	We	Th	Fr	Sa
1	2	3	4	5	6	7
8	9	10	11	12	13	14
15	16	17	18	19	20	21
22	23	24	25	26	27	28
29	30	31

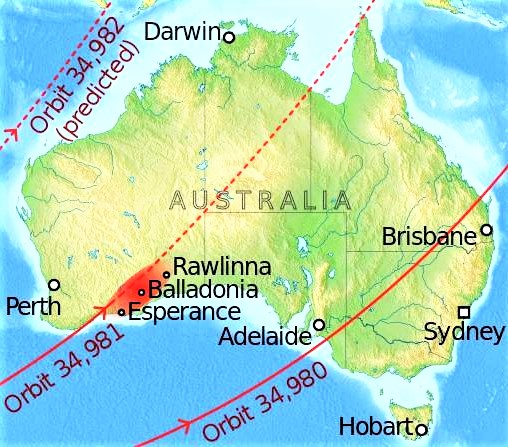
July 11, 1979: Skylab space station falls in Australian outback on 34,981st orbit

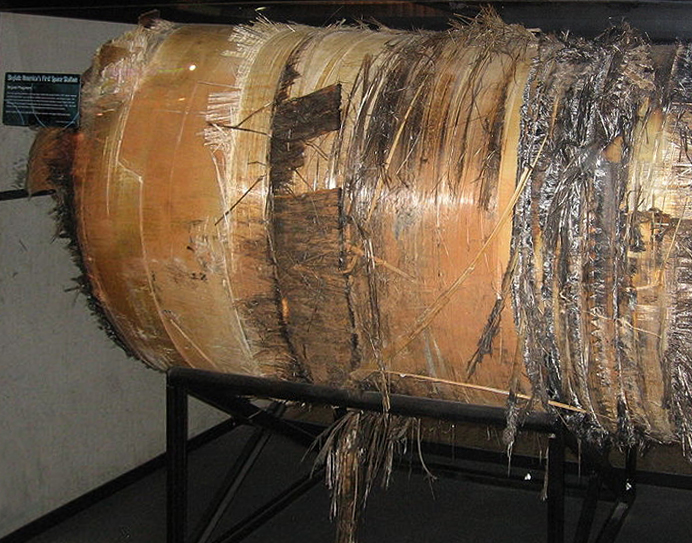
The largest piece of Skylab debris, an oxygen tank recovered in the state of Western Australia

July 12, 1979: Gilbert Islands independent as Republic of Kiribati

The following events occurred in July 1979:

== July 1, 1979 (Sunday) ==
- Sweden outlawed corporal punishment in the home. Sweden became the world's first nation to explicitly ban corporal punishment through an amendment to the Parenthood and Guardianship Code which stated: "Children are entitled to care, security and a good upbringing. Children are to be treated with respect for their person and individuality and may not be subjected to corporal punishment or any other humiliating treatment.".

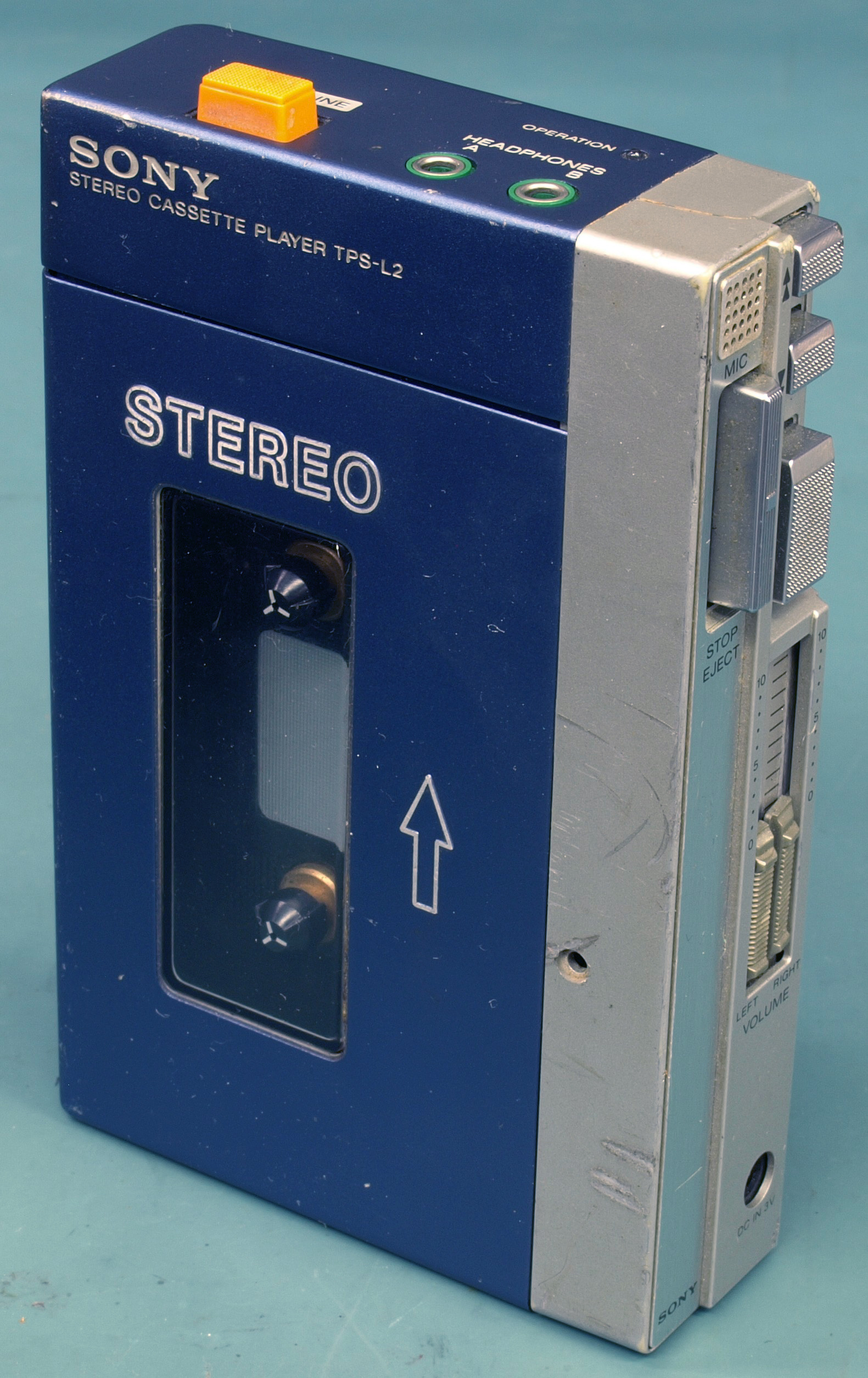
The first version of the Walkman

- The Sony Walkman, a pocket-sized cassette tape player, went on sale for the first time in Japan and would become a bestselling item in the 1980s
- Elections were held in Mexico and the Institutional Revolutionary Party won 296 of the 400 seats in the Chamber of Deputies.
- Elections were held in Bolivia for a new president, with nominees from eight political parties receiving votes. Three former Bolivian presidents received more votes than the remaining five candidates, with Hernán Siles Zuazo (president 1956 to 1960) finishing first, Víctor Paz Estenssoro (1952-1956 and 1960–1964) was second and Hugo Banzer (1971-1978) third. Since no candidate received at least 50 percent of the vote the Bolivian constitution provided for the Congress to select the winner. Elections were also held for the Chamber of Deputies and for the Bolivian Senate, with the MNRA (Revolutionary Nationalist Movement–Alliance) party of Paz Estenssoro electing a majority of 16 of the 27 Senators, and 48 of the 117 deputies.
- Republic Airlines was formed by the merger of North Central Airlines and Southern Airways.
- CITIC Group, a worldwide conglomerate and financial and investment service, founded by Rong Yiren in China.
- Born: Forrest Griffin, American retired mixed martial artist and former UFC Light Heavyweight Champion; in Columbus, Ohio

== July 2, 1979 (Monday) ==
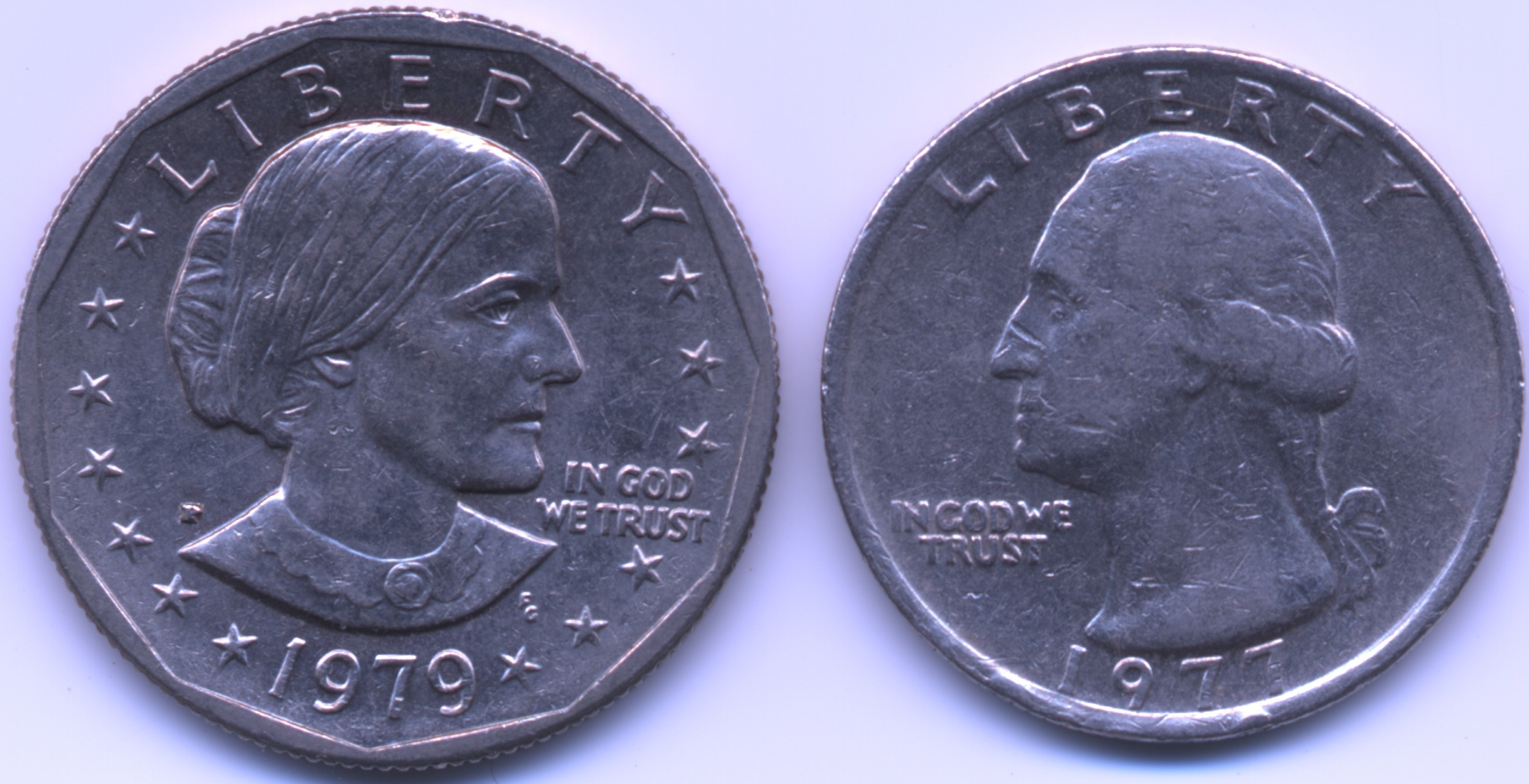
The Susan B. Anthony dollar (left) was similar in size to a quarter (right)..

- The Susan B. Anthony dollar coin was released to the general public, with deliveries to banks throughout the United States. Reaction to the coin was unfavorable because its diameter (26.5 mm) was only slightly larger than that of an American quarter (24.26 mm).
- In elections for the legislature in Saint Lucia, the Saint Lucia Labour Party, led by Allan Louisy, won 12 of the 17 seats and the United Workers Party won the other five. Louisy replaced Sir John Compton as Prime Minister.
- Ignatius IV of Antioch became the new Patriarch of the Greek Orthodox Church.
- The "CIA invert" one dollar postage stamp was issued.
- Died: Carlyle Smith Beals, 80, Canadian astronomer

== July 3, 1979 (Tuesday) ==
- U.S. President Jimmy Carter signed the first directive for secret aid to the opponents of the pro-Soviet regime in Afghanistan, with $500,000 of "non-lethal assistance" by the U.S. Central Intelligence Agency to the Mujahideen.
- All 49 people on the Indian ore carrier MV Kairali disappeared, along with the ship, when the vessel apparently sank after its last transmission to the Kerala Shipping Company. The ship had departed Margao at the Goa state three days earlier with a load of iron ore and was on its way to Djibouti in northeast Africa and was traversing the Indian Ocean when it was last heard from.
- The Bundestag, the lower house of the parliament of West Germany, voted, 255 to 222 to abolish the statute of limitations for war crimes committed during World War II, rather than to allow it to expire on December 31. Fiercely debated in the lower house, the bill was already expected to pass in the upper house, the Bundesrat, without difficulty.
- Born: Ludivine Sagnier, French film actress and model; in La Celle-Saint-Cloud
- Died:
  - Louis Durey, 91, French classical music composer
  - Alam Lohar, 51, Pakistani folk singer, was killed in an auto accident when a truck crashed into him while he was driving.

== July 4, 1979 (Wednesday) ==
- The AutoZone chain of automotive parts and accessories was founded with the opening of its first location, a store in Forrest City, Arkansas. Originally called "Auto Shack", the company, which now has more than 6,000 franchises, would change its name to AutoZone after being sued for trademark infringement by the Tandy Corporation, owner of the Radio Shack chain of electronic stores.
- The house arrest of Ahmed Ben Bella, the first President of Algeria, was partially lifted after more than 14 years in conjunction with the 17th anniversary of Algeria's independence. Ben Bella had been confined to a house in the city of M'Sila after being deposed on June 14, 1965.
- Died:
  - Mendy Rudolph, 53, American professional basketball referee from 1973 to 1975, and inductee into the Basketball Hall of Fame, died of a heart attack.
  - Theodora Kroeber, 82, American anthropologist

== July 5, 1979 (Thursday) ==
- The millennial anniversary of the founding of the parliament of the world's oldest continuously operated parliament, the High Court of Tynwald (Ard-whaiyl Tinvaal), was celebrated on the Isle of Man in the United Kingdom. Queen Elizabeth II came to the island's capital, Douglas, to open the Tynwald Day ceremonies. The millennial date appeared to have been picked arbitrarily, with no evidence of the founding of Tynwald in the year 979 nor of an assembly earlier than the 15th century.
- Japan banned the importation of whale meat from any nation that was not a member of the International Whaling Commission.
- Angola's President Agostinho Neto issued a decree requiring all Angolan citizens 18 or older to serve in the military for three years.
- Born:
  - Amélie Mauresmo, Swiss-born French professional tennis player, former ATP No. 1 for five weeks in 2005, and winner of the Australian Open and Wimbledon' in Geneva
  - Shane Filan, Irish singer and songwriter; in Sligo
- Died: Rachel Sherwood, 45, American poet, was killed in an automobile accident.

== July 6, 1979 (Friday) ==
- Ahmad Shah Massoud launched the first insurrection in Afghanistan against the Soviet-backed communist government, attempting to start an insurrection in the Panjshir Province.
- Martina Navratilova of Czechoslovakia, who had defected to the U.S. in 1975, won the women's singles tennis title at Wimbledon, defeating Chris Evert of the U.S. in straight sets, 6–4, 6–4.
- Born:
  - Nic Cester, Australian singer and musician, in Melbourne
  - Kevin Hart, American comedian, in Philadelphia
- Died:
  - Elizabeth Ryan, 87, American-born British professional tennis player who won 19 doubles titles in Grand Slam events (including 12 women's doubles and seven mixed doubles at Wimbledon between 1914 and 1934), and three singles titles at Wimbledon and the U.S. Open. Ms. Ryan was at Wimbledon to watch the final of the men's doubles, and collapsed after walking to the women's restroom.
  - Van McCoy, 39, American songwriter known for The Hustle, died from a heart attack
  - Dr. Luisa Guidotti Mistrali, 47, Italian physician and Roman Catholic missionary, was shot to death by police in Zimbabwe Rhodesia when she turned her car as she was approaching a roadblock.

== July 7, 1979 (Saturday) ==
- The 'Agreement on Trade Relations' was signed which established reciprocal Most-Favored-Nation (MFN) status between the United States and China.
- The first round of parliamentary elections in Nigeria was conducted for the 95-member Nigerian Senate and the 449 member Nigerian House of Representatives, with runoff elections held on July 14 for any seats where no candidate obtained a majority. The elections were the first since 1964 and the first under the new constitution for the transition to civilian rule. The National Party of Nigeria, led by Shehu Shagari won a plurality of seats in both houses, though far short of a majority and entered into a coalition government with the third-place Nigerian People's Party. Shagari was elected President of Nigeria on August 11.
- Björn Borg of Sweden defeated Roscoe Tanner of the U.S. for Borg's fourth consecutive men's singles title in tennis at Wimbledon, winning in the 10th game of the fifth set, 6–7, 6–1, 3–6, 6-3 and 6–4.
- Born:
  - Douglas Hondo, Zimbabwean cricket bowler and national team member; in Bulawayo, Zimbabwe Rhodesia
  - Amanda Françozo, Brazilian television host; in Ibaté, São Paulo
  - Pat Barry, American mixed martial artist and kickboxer; in New Orleans
- Died: Ian Mackintosh, 38, British novelist and naval officer, disappeared along with two other people while on a flight over the Gulf of Alaska. The airplane, a Rallye 235-G was approaching its destination of Kodiak after taking off from Anchorage. Neither wreckage of the plane, nor its occupants, was ever found.

== July 8, 1979 (Sunday) ==
- The People's Republic of China gave permission for foreign investment for the first time since the 1949 Communist revolution, promulgating a 15-article code that would provide rules for foreign corporations to invest capital as part of joint ventures and for the companies to keep their profits.
- A crowd of 10,000 spectators at the Elstree stadium at Hertfordshire, near London, witnessed the death of motorcycle stunt rider Robin Winter-Smith as he was attempting to jump over a 212-foot (65 m) row of Rolls-Royce automobiles. Winter-Smith, a 27-year-old Englishman, had gotten over all 28 of the Rolls-Royces after attaining a speed of 100 miles per hour (160 km/h) at takeoff from a ramp, but his motorcycle struck the edge of the landing ramp, throwing him into the scaffolding.
- Died:
  - Shin'ichirō Tomonaga, 73, Japanese physicist and 1965 Nobel laureate known for the Schwinger–Tomonaga equation
  - Michael Wilding, 66, English stage, film and television actor
  - Robert Burns Woodward, 62, American organic chemist and 1965 Nobel laureate for whom the Woodward–Hoffmann rules and the Woodward cis-hydroxylation chemical reaction are named

== July 9, 1979 (Monday) ==
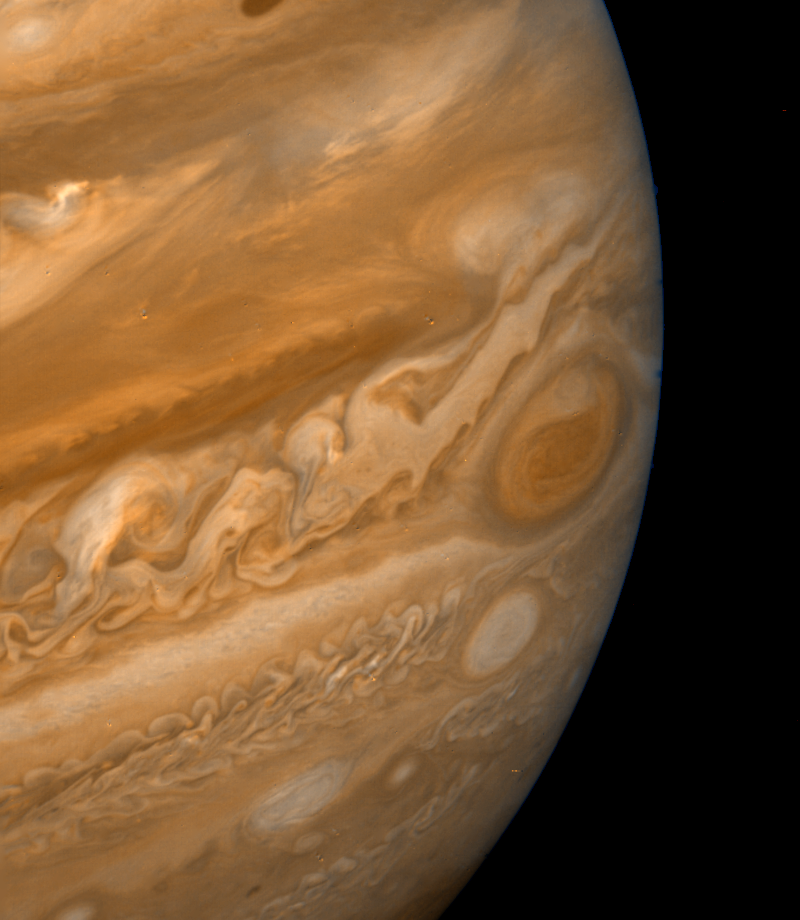
Voyager 2's picture of Jupiter's Great Red Spot

- The U.S. interplanetary probe Voyager 2 made its closest approach to the planet Jupiter at 22:29 UTC at a range of 400,785 miles (645,001 km). It transmitted new data on the planet's clouds, its newly discovered four moons, and ring system as well as 17,000 new pictures.
- The second round of the presidential election in Ghana took place as a runoff between the two highest receiver of votes in the June 18 primary. Hilla Limann of the People's National Party won 62 percent of the vote over Victor Owusu of the Popular Front Party.
- In Iran, the Ayatollah Khomeini proclaimed a general amnesty for "all people who committed offenses under the past regime" during the reign of the Shah of Iran, with the exception of persons involved in murder or torture.
- A car bomb destroyed a Renault owned by Nazi hunters Serge Klarsfeld and Beate Klarsfeld at their home in France. The Klarsfelds were not in or near the car when the explosion took place, and there was no second incident. An anonymous claim of responsibility was made by individuals who said they were with ODESSA, a group founded after World War II by former SS officers to assist fellow Nazis in escaping from Germany.
- Born: Gary Chaw, Malaysian singer-songwriter and star in Taiwan; as Chaw Pak Haw in Kota Belud, Sabah

== July 10, 1979 (Tuesday) ==
- President Jimmy Carter of the United States issued an order for all federal buildings to limit their use of air conditioning to no lower than 78 °F (26 °C) during hot months, and no warmer than 65 °F (18 °C) during cold weather.
- Thirteen people were killed and 60 injured in the collision of two trains in Italy near Mount Vesuvius and the village of Santa Caterina.
- American gangster Anthony Provenzano, convicted of racketeering on May 25, was sentenced to prison for 20 years. He would die less than 10 years later on December 12, 1988.
- Died:
  - Arthur Fiedler, 84, American orchestra conductor for the Boston Pops and the Boston Symphony.
  - U.S. Air Force Major General John D. Lavelle, 62, controversial military officer demoted to lesser rank and forcibly retired
  - Adrianus Djajasepoetra, 85, Indonesian Roman Catholic priest and former Archbishop of Jakarta

== July 11, 1979 (Wednesday) ==
- NASA's first orbiting space station, Skylab, began falling back Earth as its orbit decayed after more than six years. The debris landed in Australia's Outback, with the largest surviving piece found 6 miles (9.7 km) south of Rawlinna, Western Australia.
- All 61 people aboard a Garuda Airlines jetliner were killed when the Fokker F28 crashed into the side of 7,200 foot (2,200 m) Mount Sibayak at an altitude of 5,560 feet (1,690 m). The plane was en route from Palembang to Medan.
- The European Parliament held its first session after direct elections of its members, and Simone Veil of France was elected as its first President
- Born: Im Soo-jung, South Korean film and TV actress; in Seoul
- Died:
  - Uroob (pen name for Parutholli Chalappurathu Kuttikrishnan), 64, Indian writer and Malayalam language author.
  - Giorgio Ambrosoli, 45, Italian prosecutor who was investigating criminal activities of banker Michele Sindona, was shot to death outside of his home in Milan

== July 12, 1979 (Thursday) ==
- The Gilbert Islands became fully independent of the United Kingdom as Kiribati. Ieremia Tabai, the 29-year-old Chief Minister of the Gilbert Islands, was sworn in as the first President of Kiribati, after accepting the independence documents brought by Princess Anne, the daughter of Queen Elizabeth II.
- In Spain, a fire at the Hotel Corona de Aragón, in Zaragoza killed 72 people, and injured 46 others. The blaze started in the kitchen hotel's coffee shop on the ground floor during the frying of cooking oil.
- Disco Demolition Night, a publicity stunt at Chicago's Comiskey Park that featured a bonfire for fans to destroy their disco music records, went awry, forcing the Chicago White Sox to forfeit their game against the Detroit Tigers.
- Carmine Galante, boss of the Bonanno crime family, was shot to death along with his bodyguard and the owner of the restaurant where he was dining. Galante was at a patio table of the Joe and Mary Italian-American Restaurant on Knickerbocker Avenue in Brooklyn when three gunmen, wearing ski masks, shot him at point-blank range. Killed as well were bodyguard Leonardo Coppolla and restaurateur Giuseppe Turano. The Galante family was subsequently refused a Roman Catholic funeral mass by the Archbishop of New York City, Terence Cardinal Cooke.
- A new constitution was promulgated in Peru, bringing an end to 10 years of military rule and replacing the suspended 1933 Constitution. It became effective in 1980 with the re-election of deposed President Fernando Belaúnde Terry. It limited the president to a single five-year term and established a bicameral legislature consisting of a 60-member Senate (upper house) and a 180-member Chamber of Deputies (lower house). It also eliminated the literacy requirement for voting and extended suffrage to all adults 18 or older.
- Died: Minnie Riperton, 31, American singer known for "Lovin' You", died from metastatic breast cancer

== July 13, 1979 (Friday) ==
- In Taiwan, at least 15 people in Taipei were killed and 61 injured when chemicals in the basement of a building exploded during a fire.
- President António Ramalho Eanes of Portugal announced the dissolution of the nation's parliament, the Assembleia da República, and that he would schedule a date for new elections.
- After suing the estate of their mother, film actress Joan Crawford, who had excluded them from her will, Christina Crawford and her brother Christopher settled for $55,000. Christina had written a "tell-all" book the year before, Mommie Dearest.
- Born:
  - Ladyhawke (stage name for Phillipa Brown), New Zealand singer songwriter; in Masterton
  - Daniel Galera, Brazilian novelist; in São Paulo
  - Dejan Ćirjaković, Serbian TV actor and comedian; in Novi Sad, SR Serbia, Yugoslavia
- Died:
  - Corinne Griffith, 84, American silent film actress
  - Bob Lane, 32, Australian rules footballer and Victoria Police detective, was shot and killed in the line of duty.

== July 14, 1979 (Saturday) ==
- The second of two rounds of elections in Nigeria for the 449-seat Nigerian House of Representatives was completed, with the National Party winning 168 seats, followed by 111 for the United Party and three other parties gaining the remaining 170 seats.
- Born: Frederik Siouen, Belgian singer and songwriter; in Ghent
- Died:
  - Bernard Darke, 54. Guyanese journalist and Jesuit priest, was stabbed to death by supporters of Prime Minister Forbes Burnham while taking pictures of a riot in the South American nation's capital, Georgetown.
  - Billy McCrary, 32, American professional wrestler who, with his identical twin brother, was part of a tag team wrestling duo called "The McGuire Twins", was killed in a motorcycle accident. At 723 lb (328 kg), McCrary and his 745 lb (338 kg) brother Benny were listed by Guinness World Records as the "World's Heaviest Twins".

== July 15, 1979 (Sunday) ==
- U.S. President Jimmy Carter addressed the nation on television, talking about the "crisis of confidence" in America at that time as part of measures to respond to the shortage of oil and gasoline, in what would be remembered as the "national malaise" speech. Although the word "malaise" was never actually used, the speech was one of the more pessimistic given by an American president as he told listeners that "I want to talk to you right now about a fundamental threat to American democracy," which he identified as a "crisis of confidence". Among Carter's statements were that "For the first time in the history of our country a majority of our people believe that the next 5 years will be worse than the past 5 years," and "there is a growing disrespect for government and for churches and for schools, the news media, and other institutions."
- Morarji Desai announced his resignation as Prime Minister of India, one day before he was facing a vote of no confidence in India's lower house of parliament, the Lok Sabha. Earlier in the day, 18 members of parliament announced that they were leaving Desai's Janata Party that formed the largest part of his coalition government.
- Soviet cosmonauts Vladimir Lyakhov and Valery Ryumin set a new record for space flight endurance as they completed their 140th day in orbit aboard the Salyut 6 space station. Lyakhov and Ryumin had arrived at the station on February 25 after being launched aboard Soyuz 32, and broke the record of 139 days, 14 hours and 48 minutes set in November by cosmonauts Vladimir Kovalyonok and Aleksandr Ivanchenkov of Soyuz 29.
- Born:
  - Laura Benanti, American stage actor and Tony Award-winner for Gypsy; in New York City
  - Amanda Downum, American fantasy fiction author; in Virginia Beach, Virginia
  - Travis Fimmel, Australian-born U.S. TV actor; in Echuca, Victoria
- Died:
  - Gustavo Díaz Ordaz, 68, President of Mexico from 1964 to 1970
  - Juana de Ibarbourou, 87, Uruguayan poet

== July 16, 1979 (Monday) ==
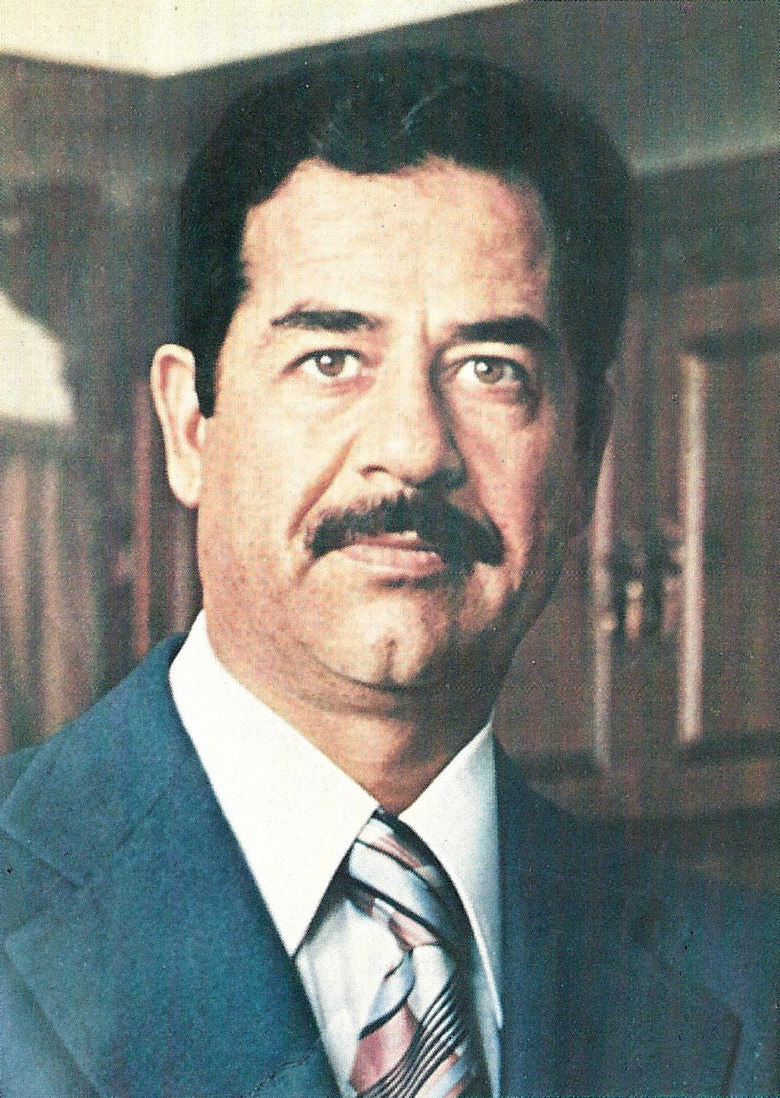
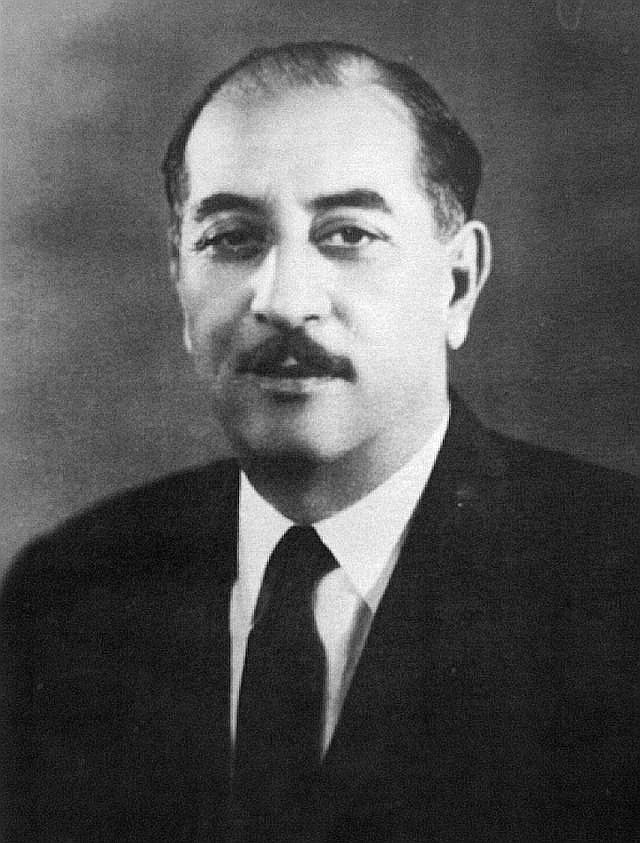
Saddam Hussein and Hasan al-Bakr
- Iraqi President Hasan al-Bakr resigned after almost 11 years in power. Vice President Saddam al-Tikriti, more commonly referred to in the Western press as "Saddam Hussein", replaced him.
- The largest release of radioactive material in U.S. history, the Church Rock uranium mill spill, took place near Church Rock, New Mexico when a dam was breached, releasing the contents of a disposal pond maintained by United Nuclear Corporation. From the pond, 94 million U.S. gallons of acidic solution and 1,000 tons of solid radioactive mill waste flowed into the Puerco River and then into the Little Colorado River. The spill contaminated the water supply of much of McKinley County, New Mexico and Navajo County, Arizona within the Navajo Nation territory.
- Born:
  - Kim Rhode, American double trap shooter and skeet shooter and three time Olympic gold medalist in 1996, 2004 and 2012; in Whittier, California
  - Jayma Mays, American film and TV actress; in Bristol, Tennessee
- Died: Alfred Deller, 67, English Baroque music singer

== July 17, 1979 (Tuesday) ==
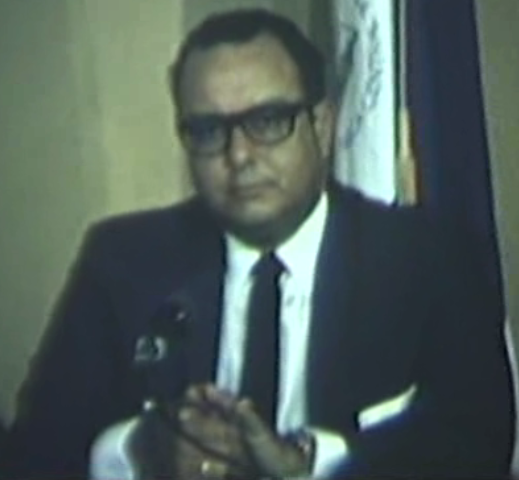
Anastasio Somoza

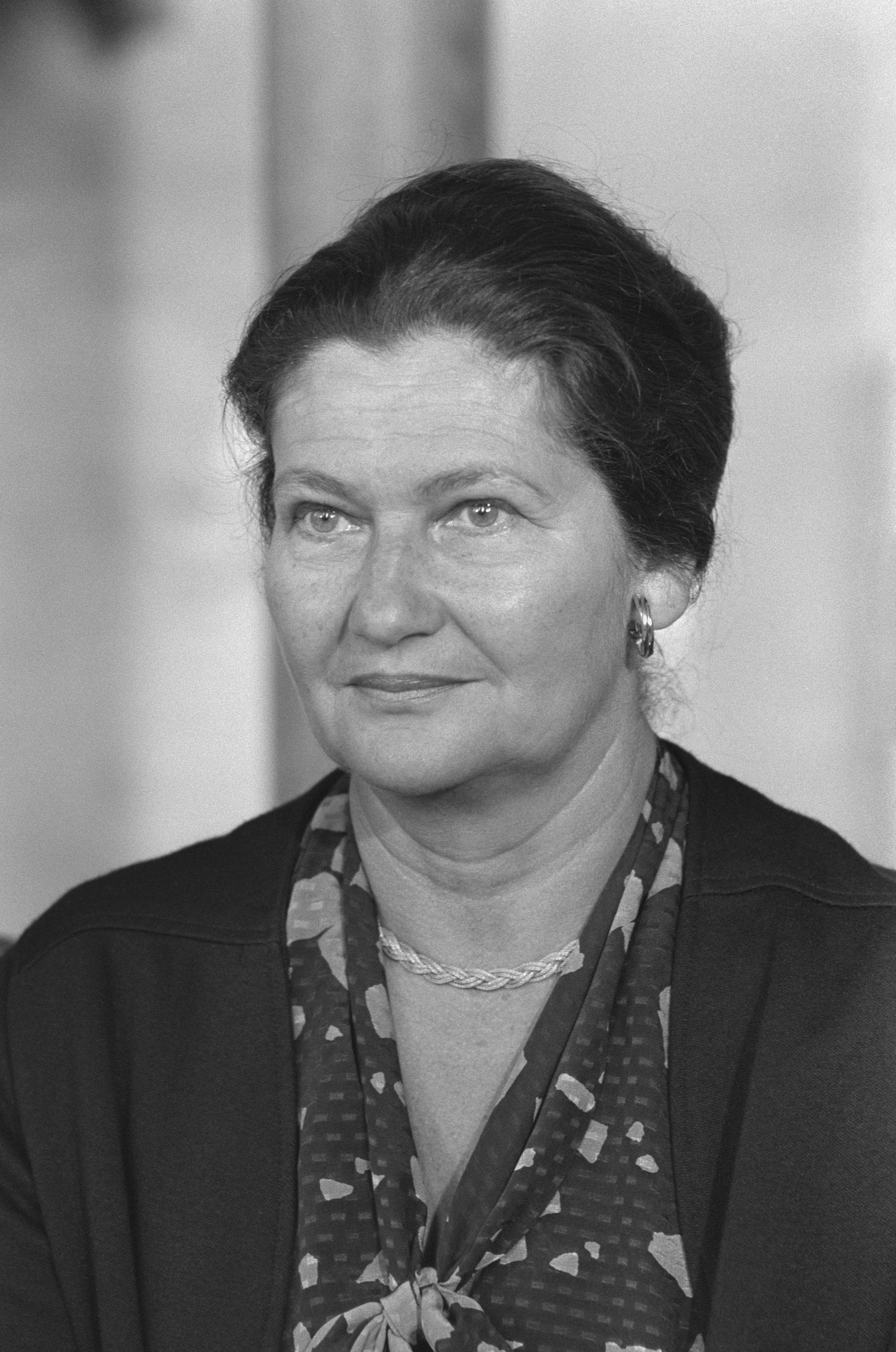
European Parliament president Veil

- Nicaraguan president General Anastasio Somoza Debayle resigned and fled to Miami as the Sandinista guerrillas approached the capital at Managua. Nicaragua's Congress accepted Somoza's resignation at 1:50 in the morning and named Chamber of Deputies leader Francisco Urcuyo as the new president during negotiations for transition of government to a Sandinista-backed junta. Somoza and 45 aides boarded an airplane and departed Managua at 5:10 in the morning, bringing an end to 46 years of rule by the Somoza family.
- Simone Veil, a concentration camp survivor and the former Minister of Health of France, was elected President of the European Parliament. Voting for the presiding officer of the 410-member body took place in Strasbourg, and Ms. Veil defeated Mario Zagari of Italy on the second ballot.
- At the request of U.S. President Jimmy Carter, all 34 members of his Cabinet and senior staff of advisers offered their resignations as part of a plan by Carter to reorganize his government, giving him the option to replace any person whose offer he accepted. Among those replaced by Carter were Treasury Secretary W. Michael Blumenthal, Attorney General Griffin Bell and Health, Education and Welfare (HEW) Secretary Joseph A. Califano, Jr. by G. William Miller, Benjamin R. Civiletti and Patricia Roberts Harris, respectively.
- Sebastian Coe of England set the new world record for the shortest time for running one mile (1,609.34m), covering the distance at Oslo's Bislet Stadium in Norway in 3 minutes, 48.95 seconds. Coe, who had broken the world record for fastest time in running 1500 meters (0.932 miles) on July 5, broke the mile record, set by New Zealand's John Walker on August 12, 1975, of 3 minutes, 49.4 seconds.
- Born: Mike Vogel, American film actor and male model; in Abington, Pennsylvania
- Died: Edward Akufo-Addo, 73, President of Ghana, 1970 to 1972, died from natural causes a month after three other former presidents of Ghana had been executed.

== July 18, 1979 (Wednesday) ==
- More than 500 people were killed by a tsunami that struck the island of Lembata in Indonesia. The tidal wave resulted from massive landslides from a nearby summit, Mount Werung. The waters of the Flores Sea swept inward 450 feet (140 m) in the middle of the night when most of its victims were asleep, washing away houses, trees and farms. The estimate of 539 deaths was made based on the recovery of 175 bodies and the failure to find 364 people who had been missing since the wave had destroyed four villages on the island.
- Less than 24 hours after being made the acting President of Nicaragua, Francisco Urcuyo boarded an airplane at the airport in Managua and fled to Guatemala.
- Born: Jason Weaver, American comedian and TV actor, and (as "J-Weav"), American rap artist; in Chicago

== July 19, 1979 (Thursday) ==
- Twenty-six of the crew of the Greek oil tanker SS Atlantic Empress were killed when the ship collided with another oil tanker, SS Aegean Captain, which lost one crewman. After being set ablaze, Atlantic Empress burned for two weeks and sank on August 4 in the Caribbean Sea 33 kilometres (21 mi) away from the island of Tobago, spilling 287,000 metric tonnes of crude oil, the largest spill ever from a tanker.
- Maria de Lourdes Pintasilgo became prime minister of Portugal.
- A motion in the British House of Commons, to restore capital punishment as the maximum penalty for crimes, overwhelmingly failed to pass with 243 in favor and 362 against.
- Died: Jack Filmer, 83, Australian-born New Zealand agricultural scientist

== July 20, 1979 (Friday) ==
- The Sandinista National Liberation Front concluded a successful revolutionary campaign against the Somoza dynasty and assumed power in Nicaragua. Escorted by hundreds of armed Sandinista guerrillas, the five-member Junta of National Reconstruction arrived in Managua before a cheering crowd. Led by Daniel Ortega, the junta was completed by two left-wing activists, Sergio Ramírez and Moisés Hassan Morales, and two right-wing representatives, Alfonso Robelo and Violeta Barrios de Chamorro.
- Executive Order 12148 was issued by U.S. President Carter to transfer and reassign duties to the newly formed Federal Emergency Management Agency (FEMA), which had been created by his Executive Order 12127.
- Born:
  - Amr Shabana, Egyptian professional squash player and world champion in 2003, 2005, 2007 and 2009; in Cairo
  - Claudine Barretto, Philippine TV actress; in Manila
- Died: Herbert Butterfield, 78, British historian

== July 21, 1979 (Saturday) ==
- Maritza Sayalero of Venezuela won the Miss Universe pageant. The stage collapsed after contestants and news photographers rushed to see her.
- The disco music genre dominated and peaks on the Billboard Hot 100 chart, with the first six spots (beginning with Donna Summer's Bad Girls), and seven of the chart's top ten songs ending that week.
- Died:
  - Boris Giuliano, 48, Italian law enforcement official who led the Squadre Volanti special police unit in Palermo, was shot to death by a Mafia contract killer while at a coffee house.
  - Wayne Souza, 21, American college football player, drowned in Lake Monona, Wisconsin
  - Rexford Tugwell, 88, American economic adviser to U.S. President Franklin Roosevelt who developed the recovery plan in the New Deal

== July 22, 1979 (Sunday) ==
- Six days after taking office as President of Iraq, Saddam Hussein ordered a purge of the leadership of the Ba’ath Party with the arrest and later execution of nearly 70 members of the Party. The government confirmed on July 29 that arrests had been taking place since July 20 of government officials accused of "conspiracy against the party and revolution" and that a seven-member special court of the Revolutionary Command Council was conducting hearings on people accused of treason.
- A two-hour battle between the Navy of South Korea and an armed spy ship from North Korea took place off of the southern coastal port of Tongyeong in South Korea. Two South Koreans were killed, and the North Korean vessel was sunk. Five bodies were recovered from the sea around the ship, which went down with an unknown number of crew.
- The new Sandinista government of Nicaragua promulgated the Law of National Emergency allowing all media in the Central American nation to be placed under government control.
- The first ascent of Mount Demaria, located in Antarctica, was made by four British explorers.
- Died: Sándor Kocsis, 49, Hungarian soccer footballer with 68 caps for the Hungary national team, fell to his death from his hospital room in Barcelona

== July 23, 1979 (Monday) ==
- In the Australian state of Victoria, farmer Thomas Barnes declared his property to be the "Independent State of Rainbow Creek" in protest over the state government's failure to control flooding.
- In Beirut, the crash of a TMA Cargo Boeing 707 jet killed all six people aboard the Lebanese freight-carrying airplane during a test flight that was part of the qualification procedure for four co-pilots to be promoted to the job of airline captain.
- Born: Michelle Williams, American singer and member of Destiny's Child; in Rockford, Illinois

== July 24, 1979 (Tuesday) ==
- Withdrawal of United Nations peacekeeping forces, from the Sinai Peninsula between Egypt and Israel, was approved by the United Nations Security Council, but the Security Council voted to maintain a corps of observers to monitor Israel's agreement to pull back its own troops.
- The United States effectively granted recognition of the new, leftist government of Nicaragua by agreeing to continue diplomatic relations with the Central American nation and the news Sandinista regime.
- In Iran, the Ayatollah Ruhollah Khomeini ordered a ban of all music on radio and television, declaring that music was "no different from opium" and would not be tolerated in the Islamic Republic of Iran.
- Serial murderer Ted Bundy was convicted for the 1978 murder of two Florida State University students. The jury recommended one week later that Bundy be sentenced to death. He would die in the electric chair at the Florida State Prison on January 24, 1989.
- Serial murderer Rodney Alcala was arrested at his mother's house in Monterey Park, California, for the murder of his final victim, Robin Samsoe, who had disappeared on June 20. He would be convicted of five murders in California, and later of two more in New York, and sentenced to be executed, but would die on July 24, 2021 at the age of 77, exactly 39 years after his arrest.
- Eight of the 21 people aboard Prinair Flight 610 were killed when the overloaded de Havilland Heron turboprop crashed on takeoff from St. Croix in the Virgin Islands.
- Born:
  - Rose Byrne, Australian film and TV actor; in Balmain, New South Wales
  - Stat Quo (stage name for Stanley Benton), American rapper, in Atlanta
- Died: Edward Stachura, 41, Polish poet and writer, hanged himself

== July 25, 1979 (Wednesday) ==
- A major accident occurred at Moruroa Atoll during a nuclear test by France. A test was conducted at half the usual depth because the nuclear weapon being used got stuck halfway down the 800 m (2,600 ft) shaft. After engineers were unable to move the device to its proper level, the decision was made to leave it in place for detonation. The blast caused a large submarine landslide on the southwest rim of the atoll, causing a significant chunk of the outer slope of the atoll to break loose, causing a tsunami affecting Mururoa and injuring workers. The blast caused a 2 kilometre long and 40 cm wide crack to appear on the atoll.
- Israel transferred control of 2,500 square miles (6,500 km^{2}) of territory in the Sinai Peninsula, around the populated oasis of Bir Nasseb, back to Egypt, 12 years after the land had been captured in the Six-Day War in 1967.
- Born: Allister "Ali" Carter, English professional snooker player and runner-up in the 2008 and 2012 world championships; in Colchester, Essex

== July 26, 1979 (Thursday) ==
- Dr. George F. Andreasen, an orthodontist and mechanical engineer working at the University of Iowa, received the patent for his creation of the first shape-memory alloy, Nitinol, allowing for wire that could be manipulated as necessary, then returned to its original configuration after the application of heat. Dr. Andreasen's alloy of nickel (Ni) and titanium (Ti) received U.S. Patent No. 4,037,324.
- The new government of Nicaragua announced it would allow 199 of 271 refugees to leave the Central American nation, and provide for safe passage, after the group had been given sanctuary at the Salvadoran embassy in Managua. The Sandinista government, however, demanded that El Salvador turn over 72 other former Guardia Nacional members and government officials who were suspected of war crimes.
- India's President N. Sanjiva Reddy asked Deputy Prime Minister Charan Singh to form a new coalition government after Singh had garnered the support of 280 of the 538 members of the Lok Sabha, the lower house of India's parliament from various parties.
- Born:
  - Johnson Beharry, Grenadian-born British Army officer and Victoria Cross recipient; in St. George's, Grenada
  - Derek Paravicini, English autistic savant and musical prodigy; in Reading, Berkshire

== July 27, 1979 (Friday) ==
- Morarji Desai, who had already resigned as Prime Minister of India, announced that he was also quitting as leader of the ruling Janata Party. The move came after former Janata Party member and Deputy Prime Minister Charan Singh had challenged Desai's leadership and left the party.
- One of the highest-grossing independent films in history, The Amityville Horror, premiered in North America. The horror film was based on the bestselling book of the same name, written by Jay Anson and based on the experiences of the Lutz family at 112 Ocean Avenue in the Long Island suburb of Amityville, New York.
- The Australian heavy metal band AC/DC released its breakthrough album, Highway to Hell, bringing the group to prominence with American audiences.
- Born: Jorge Arce, Mexican professional boxer and world flyweight champion, light flyweight, super flyweight, junior featherweight and bantamweight champion for the World Boxing Organization (WBO) and the WBA, WBC and IBF between 1998 and 2010; in Los Mochis, Sinaloa state
- Died:
  - Zuheir Mohsen, 43, Palestinian and Jordanian politician, was assassinated in France, shot multiple times while walking towards his apartment in Cannes after leaving a casino. No group claimed responsibility, and the motive for his killing was never identified.
  - Shirley Mason (stage name for Leonie Flugrath), 78, American silent film actress

== July 28, 1979 (Saturday) ==
- Chaudhary Charan Singh became the new Prime Minister of India by forming a government to replace Morarji Desai, who had resigned earlier in the month. Singh organized a coalition government from three political parties and was sworn in by President N. S. Reddy at Ashoka Hall in the presidential mansion in New Delhi.
- Born: Shahzoda, Uzbek singer, in Fergana
- Died: George Seaton, 68, American film director and screenwriter who won an Academy Award in 1947 for Miracle on 34th Street

== July 29, 1979 (Sunday) ==
- Seventy-three people were killed in a fire at the Lakshimki Talkies Cinema in the city of Tuticorin in Tamil Nadu state in India. According to the Press Trust of India, the fire began when the movie screen caught fire and the flames spread upward to the cinema's thatched roof, and the burning debris then collapsed upon people still within the building.
- Seven people were killed and over 100 injured when three terrorist bombs exploded within 15 minutes of each other in Spain at the Madrid international airport and in train stations in the cities of Bilbao and San Sebastián. The bombs, set by the Basque separatist group ETA, exploded at 1:01, 1:10 and 1:15 in the afternoon.
- Died:
  - Herbert Marcuse, 81, German-born American political theorist
  - David Campbell, 84, English poet
  - Bill Todman, 63, American TV game show producer and partner with Mark Goodson.

== July 30, 1979 (Monday) ==
- Carless days in New Zealand were introduced by the national government of New Zealand, going into effect at 2:00 in the morning. The first person fined was Gordon Marks of Christchurch, stopped at 3:45 a.m. after a post-party nap in his car. He was fined $50 for the first offense rather than the $400 maximum fine.
- The government of Israel's Prime Minister Menahem Begin survived a vote of no confidence in the Knesset, with 48 in favor of the motion and 58 against. The motion followed a July 15 cabinet meeting that failed to reach an agreement on resolving an economic crisis of inflation of prices.
- The long-running Philippine daytime variety show Eat ... Bulaga! premiered.
- Born:
  - Graeme McDowell, Northern Irish professional golfer and 2010 U.S. Open winner; in Portrush County Antrim
  - Carlos Arroyo, Puerto Rican pro basketball point guard in the NBA and pro leagues in Israel, Tukey and Spain; in Fajardo, Puerto Rico, U.S.
  - Show Lo (stage name for Luó Zhìxiáng), Taiwanese pop singer; in Keelung City
  - Maya Nasser, Syrian TV journalist; in Damascus (d. 2012)

== July 31, 1979 (Tuesday) ==
- Fifteen of the 44 passengers on Dan-Air Flight 34 and both of its pilots were killed when the turboprop crashed into the sea after its takeoff from Scotland's Shetland Islands on a flight to Aberdeen.
- The U.S. Court of Claims awarded the Sioux Indian nation $17.5 million damages, with interest at five percent dating back to 1877, for the seizure of the Black Hills (Pahá Sápa) territory in South Dakota.
- The Wendy's Milk Bar chain of ice cream stores in Australia was founded with the opening of its first location, at Adelaide in South Australia.
- Shapour Bakhtiar, the last Prime Minister for the Shah of Iran, appeared in public for the first time since he had gone into hiding on February 12, appearing at a press conference in Paris.
- The city of Lahn, created in the West German state of Hesse on January 1, 1977, by the unpopular merger of the cities of Giessen and Wetzlar, was dissolved and the two municipalities became independent of each other.
- Ten people were killed, and 77 injured, in an arson fire set at the Holiday Inn hotel in Cambridge, Ohio.
- The U.S. House of Representatives voted unanimously, 414 to 0, to censure U.S. Representative Charles Diggs of Michigan following his conviction of 11 counts of mail fraud.
- U.S. Army Air Corps Private D. B. Benson, who had been in hiding in Oklahoma for 36 years after going AWOL (absent without leave) from the air base in Amarillo, Texas, returned to normal life four weeks after turning himself in to authorities. Private Benson was given an other-than-honorable discharge after having signed papers on July 3.
- Born:
  - B. J. Novak, American comedian and TV producer; in Newton, Massachusetts
  - Jade Kwan (Kwan Wai-man), Chinese pop singer; in Hong Kong
