= Wolfgang Mitzinger =

German politician (born 1932)

Minister for Coal and Energy
- In office 28 June 1979 – 18 November 1989
- Chairman of the Council of Ministers: Willi Stoph
- Preceded by: Klaus Siebold
- Succeeded by: Position abolished

Personal details
- Born: Wolfgang Mitzinger; 18 February 1932 (age 94) Lichtenstein-Callnberg, Free State of Saxony, Weimar Republic (now Germany)
- Party: Socialist Unity Party
- Education: Bergingenieurschule Zwickau; "Karl Marx" Party Academy
- Occupation: Politician; Civil Servant; Electrician
- Awards: Patriotic Order of Merit, 3rd class; Banner of Labor
- Central institution membership: 1967–1968: Full member, Bezirk Cottbus SED leadership; Other offices held: 1989–1990: Deputy Minister, Ministry for Heavy Industries; 1972–1979: State Secretary, Ministry for Coal and Energy; 1968–1971: First Deputy Minister, Ministry for Basic Industries; 1964–1968: General Director, VVB Kraftwerke Cottbus

Wolfgang Mitzinger (born 18 February 1932) is a former German civil servant and politician of the Socialist Unity Party (SED).

An electrician by trade, Mitzinger notably served as Energy Minister of the raw material deprived GDR in the 1980s.

== Life and career ==
=== Early career ===
Mitzinger, the son of a worker, completed training as an electrician in Espenhain from 1946 to 1949 and subsequently worked there as an industrial electrician. After attending the Mining Engineering School in Zwickau for three years, he became an electrical engineer and chief energy specialist in Geiseltal.

A member of the ruling Socialist Unity Party (SED), Mitzinger became an employee of the State Planning Commission in 1960. From 1962 to 1964, he served as Deputy Head of the Coal Industry Department in the People's Economic Council, and then until 1968 as General Director of the VVB Power Plants Cottbus. In 1967/1968, he was also a member of the Bezirk Cottbus legislature and a full member of the Bezirk SED leadership.

From 1968 to 1971, he served as State Secretary and First Deputy Minister in the Ministry for Basic Industries. After attending the SED's "Karl Marx" Party Academy, he returned to the now renamed Ministry for Coal and Energy as State Secretary in 1972.

=== Minister for Coal and Energy ===
After the collapse of continuous coal and electricity supplies during the heavy snowfall of the winter of 1978/1979, Energy Minister Klaus Siebold was removed from office as a scapegoat.

December 1978 was predominantly wet and mild in the GDR, the opencast mines there were soft, so that lignite mining in that month was only 75% of the plan. Mitzinger was solely responsible in the ministry on December 29. While the temperature was still almost 10 °C, he received weather warnings and explosive reports from the Meteorological Service. However, instead of the appropriate highest level of operation III, which would have required an immediate call-up of an operational staff, he initially only declared level II, because it was impossible to imagine such an onset of winter and he had been accused of acting overly cautiously in the past.

Despite this, Mitzinger succeeded Siebold, serving as Minister for Coal and Energy of the GDR from June 1979 to November 1989.

Mitzinger was awarded the Patriotic Order of Merit in Bronze in 1970 and the Banner of Labor in 1982.

=== Peaceful Revolution ===
During the Peaceful Revolution, the Ministry for Coal and Energy was abolished in the transitional Modrow government. Mitzinger served as Deputy Minister responsible for energy in its successor, the Ministry for Heavy Industries, until April 1990.

=== Reunified Germany ===
Mitzinger came out of retirement in 2023, writing letters to Chancellor Olaf Scholz and Robert Habeck, Federal Minister for Economic Affairs and Climate Action and thus his successor as Energy Minister, criticizing their energy policy, in particular the transition away from coal power and Russian gas. Mitzinger's letters were left unanswered, but his criticisms were picked up by conservative outlets including Tichys Einblick, the Berliner Zeitung and the Junge Freiheit, to whom he gave an interview.

Mitzinger was however ridiculed by other outlets for his involvement in the SED's dictatorship, the taz accusing him of romanticizing the GDR.
