= Tim Dlugos =

American poet (1950–1990)

Tim Dlugos (born Francis Timothy Dlugos) (August 5, 1950 – December 3, 1990) was an American poet. Early in his career, Dlugos was celebrated for his energetic, openly gay, pop culture-infused poems. Later, he became widely known for the poems he wrote as he was dying of AIDS.

== Early life and college ==
Tim Dlugos was born in Springfield, Massachusetts, and raised by adopted parents in East Longmeadow, Massachusetts, and Arlington, Virginia. In 1968, he joined the Christian Brothers, a Catholic religious order, and entered their college, La Salle College, in Philadelphia, the following year. At La Salle, Dlugos became involved in the anti-Vietnam War movement and started writing poetry. He left the Brothers in 1971 to openly embrace a politically active, gay lifestyle. Less and less motivated by academic life, he dropped out of La Salle in his senior year, eventually moving to Washington, D.C.

== Washington, D.C. ==
Dlugos immersed himself in the Mass Transit poetry scene in Washington, regularly attending readings at the Community Book Shop in Dupont Circle. His friends during this period included Ed Cox, Tina Darragh, Michael Lally, Bernard Welt, and Terence Winch. His first chapbook, High There, was published by Some of Us Press in 1973. Dlugos worked on Ralph Nader's Public Citizen newspaper, which led to a successful career as a fundraising consultant and copywriter for liberal and charitable organizations.

== Years in New York ==
In 1976, Dlugos moved to Manhattan, where he became a prominent younger poet in the downtown literary scene centered around the Poetry Project at St. Mark's Church. His poems were praised for their innovation and wit, their appropriation of popular culture (as in his crowd-pleasing "Gilligan's Island"), and their openly gay subject matter. Dlugos's friends during his New York years included Joe Brainard, Donald Britton, Jane DeLynn, Brad Gooch, and Eileen Myles. In 1977, he began a correspondence and friendship with Dennis Cooper, then based in Los Angeles. Dlugos published two books with Cooper's Little Caesar Press: Je Suis Ein Americano (1979) and Entre Nous (1982). Of the latter, critic Marjorie Perloff wrote, "This is poetry of extraordinary speed and energy that fuses fact and fantasy, dream and documentary. Tim Dlugos' every nerve seems to vibrate." Dlugos also edited and contributed to such magazines as Christopher Street, New York Native, and The Poetry Project Newsletter.

== AIDS and death ==
Dlugos tested positive for HIV in 1987, and was diagnosed with AIDS in 1989. In 1988, he moved to New Haven, Connecticut, where he was enrolled in Yale Divinity School. His intention was to become a priest in the Episcopal Church. He died of complications due to AIDS on December 3, 1990, at the age of forty.

Dlugos is widely known for the poems he wrote while hospitalized in G-9, the AIDS ward at Roosevelt Hospital in Manhattan, and is considered a seminal poet of the AIDS epidemic. His long poem "G-9," in which Dlugos celebrates life while accepting his mortality and impending death, was published in The Paris Review only months before Dlugos died.

== Legacy ==
Two decades after Dlugos's death, his friend David Trinidad edited A Fast Life: The Collected Poems of Tim Dlugos, which won a Lambda Literary Award.

In 2011, "At Moments Like These He Feels Farthest Away," an exhibition of paintings by artist Philip Monaghan based on Dlugos's poem "Gilligan's Island," was held at Fales Library at New York University, where Dlugos's literary papers are archived.

== Books ==
- High There (Some of Us Press, 1973)
- For Years (Jawbone, 1977)
- Je Suis Ein Americano (Little Caesar Press, 1979)
- A Fast Life (Sherwood Press, 1982)
- Entre Nous (Little Caesar Press, 1982)
- Strong Place (Amethyst Press, 1992)
- Powerless: Selected Poems 1973-1990 (edited by David Trinidad; High Risk Books/Serpent's Tail, 1996)
- A Fast Life: The Collected Poems of Tim Dlugos (edited by David Trinidad; Nightboat Books, 2011)
- New York Diary (edited by David Trinidad; Sibling Rivalry Press, 2021)
