= Klaus Siebold =

German politician (1930–1995)

Minister for Coal and Energy (Note: Minister for Basic Industries from 1965 to 1971)
- In office 22 December 1965 – 28 June 1979
- Chairman of the Council of Ministers: Willi Stoph; Horst Sindermann; Willi Stoph
- Preceded by: Richard Goschütz (1958)
- Succeeded by: Wolfgang Mitzinger

Personal details
- Born: 12 September 1930 Laubusch, Saxony, Weimar Republic
- Died: 23 June 1995 (aged 64) Spremberg, Saxony, Germany
- Party: Party of Democratic Socialism
- Other political affiliations: Socialist Unity Party (1952–1989)
- Education: "Karl Marx" Party Academy (Dipl.-Ges.-Wiss.)
- Occupation: Politician; Party Functionary; Industrial Chemist
- Awards: Patriotic Order of Merit, 1st class

Klaus Siebold (12 September 1930 in Laubusch (Lauta) – 23 June 1995 in Spremberg) was a German politician.

== Life ==
=== Early years ===
He was Minister for Coal and Energy in the German Democratic Republic (East Germany) in the 1970s. He hit the headlines in 1979 in connection with his perceived role in exacerbating the consequences of the country's weather/energy crisis during the winter of 1978/79.

In 1930 Klaus Siebold was born in Laubusch, a small new town in eastern Saxony. Laubusch, originally named "Kolonie Erika" had been built ten years earlier to a plan by the architect/town planner Ewald Kleffel: it had taken on the name "Laubusch" from a nearby settlement that had been removed to make way for a lignite mine. Kleffel, who designed the town, had been much influenced by the English town planner Ebenezer Howard, but whereas Howard designed pleasant dormitory towns for London commuters, Kleffel's towns were built to support the rapidly expanding Lignite (brown coal) mining industry, and Laubusch was built to accommodate workers of the Ilse Bergbau AG mining company. Klaus Siebold's education and later life were in several respects shaped by mining. He trained as a miner. He then studied at a technical college dedicated to mining engineering, where he became a qualified Mining Engineer. Siebel was also selected for higher education at the prestigious Karl Marx Academy just outside Berlin, and here he gained a degree in Social Sciences.

=== Career ===
In 1952 Siebold took a job as a full-time official of East Germany's ruling Socialist Unity Party (SED/ Sozialistische Einheitspartei Deutschlands). Between 1957 and 1959 he served as director of a lignite-fueled power plant. He then became head of the Coal Industry section, both at the People's Economic Council (VWR / Volkswirtschaftsrat), and with the National Planning and Development Commission. Between 1963 and 1965 he was Deputy Chairman with responsibility for Coal and Energy with the VWR.

He entered government in December 1965 as Minister for Primary sector industry and was then switched in November 1971 to become Minister for Coal and Energy, a position he retained till 1979.

In April 1978 he traveled to Maputo where he signed an agreement to send more East German mining experts to Mozambique. Since January 1978 East Germans had been working in the Bituminous coal mine at Moatize, following a firedamp explosion that had taken the lives of more than 100 Mozambican miners. As head of the East German side in the joint East German/Mozambique Economic Committee, Siebold visited Mozambique two more times in 1978, and was on each occasion received by President Samora Machel.

Klaus Siebold lost his ministerial position because of the Energy Crisis that followed the exceptional winter weather in 1978/79. He had sanctioned maintenance shut downs of power plant in January 1979 at a time when sustained heavy snow falls imperiled East German power supplies. The pumps serving numerous district heating systems failed and families had to be evacuated from their frozen apartments. In cold barns young cattle were frozen to death, as were hens in their battery cages. Shortly before the snow storms, on 13/14 December 1978, at the 9th conference of the SED Central Committee, Siebold was on the receiving end of the conventional lavish praise, here from a candidate for Politburo membership called Werner Walde. In contrast, at the party's tenth conference, on 27 April 1979, criticism came from the party leader, Erich Honecker, who asked that for a decisive improvement in leadership from the Ministry of Coal and Energy. "Sudden power outages should on no account become necessary in the first place." („Plötzliche Abschaltungen dürfen gar nicht erst notwendig werden.“) On 28 June 1979 Siebold was sacked by the Chairman of the Council of State, Willi Stoph. His dismissal came without official plaudits, in eloquent contrast to the treatment afforded to Kurt Fichtner, the other minister dismissed at the same time: Fichter was fulsomely thanked for his work.

After this Siebold was sent back to work in industry. Among other things, he worked as Director of lignite-fueled power plant.

=== Democratic politics ===
In the first, and as it turned out last, free national election held in East Germany, in March 1990, Klaus Siebold stood for election in the Cottbus electoral district, but he was not elected.

== Awards ==
- 1964 Patriotic Order of Merit in Bronze
- 1971 Patriotic Order of Merit in Silver
- 1974 Patriotic Order of Merit in Gold
- 1977 Order of Merit of the People's Republic of Poland, 2nd class
