= Rachel Sherwood =

American poet

Rachel Sherwood (January 4, 1954–July 5, 1979) was an American poet.

== Early life and education ==
Rachel Sherwood was born in Washington, D.C., and grew up in Southern California. She attended California State University, Northridge, where she co-founded the literary journal Angel’s Flight and worked on The Wallace Stevens Journal. In 1978, her poem “Mysteries of Afternoon and Evening” won the Academy of American Poets Award. Sherwood published poems in Angel’s Flight, Beyond Baroque, and Foreign Exchange, and gave several poetry readings in the Los Angeles area.

== Death and legacy ==
Sherwood died in an automobile accident on July 5, 1979, at the age of twenty-five. To preserve Sherwood's memory, her friends established the Rachel Sherwood Poetry Prize at Cal State Northridge; the award is given annually to a student poet. Poet David Trinidad also created Sherwood Press in her honor and published (in collaboration with Greg Boyd's Yarmouth Press) a book of Sherwood's poems, Mysteries of Afternoon and Evening, in 1981.

Reviewing Mysteries of Afternoon and Evening in the Los Angeles Times Book Review, Peter Clothier praised Sherwood's “attentive eye and sharp ear for language” and pointed out that, given the circumstance of her death, “the prescience of her vision is disquietingly accurate in several of these poems.” One such poem, “The Usual,” concludes: “it’s the usual: spilt liquor, / broken dishes, wrecked cars.”

In his introduction to Mysteries of Afternoon and Evening, Arthur Lane noted that Sherwood's “wit was mordant—properly so, given the time and place of her maturing, Los Angeles in the 1970’s. Her appetite for life was fit for any Regency circle, though it was protected by an irony as vigilant as it was sharp-edged.” Lane also wrote that “below the balancing act that these poems carry off so well wait serious nightmares: madness, horror, the systematic brutality of the late twentieth century. Sherwood didn’t slip. As a matter of record, she did so well that people didn’t even notice she was working without a net. None of us knew how often she looked down.”

Writing about Sherwood's work in 2024, poet Sean Singer says, "Sherwood’s poems are the expression of youth in its most tender and developing state. Still, her poems show a potential that is rare and important. The poems’ unfinished quality belies what important discoveries her poems could have shown us, and show the raw material of something special."

== Published works ==
- Mysteries of Afternoon and Evening (1981)
