= David Trinidad =

American poet (born 1953)

- Born: 1953 (age 72–73); Los Angeles, California, United States
- Education: Brooklyn College (MFA)

David Trinidad (born 1953) is an American poet.

David Trinidad was born in Los Angeles, California, and raised in the San Fernando Valley. He attended California State University, Northridge, where he studied poetry with Ann Stanford and edited the literary journal Angel’s Flight. While at Northridge, he became friends with the poet Rachel Sherwood, a fellow student. On July 5, 1979, Sherwood and Trinidad were involved in an automobile accident in which Sherwood was killed and Trinidad severely injured. Later, Trinidad published a book of Rachel Sherwood's poems and established Sherwood Press in her honor.

His first book of poems, Pavane, was published in 1981. The Los Angeles Times Book Review noted that Trinidad’s "voice has assurance and integrity.” In the early 1980s, Trinidad was one of a group of poets who were active at the Beyond Baroque Literary Arts Center in Venice, California. Other members of this group included Dennis Cooper, Bob Flanagan, Amy Gerstler, Jack Skelley, and Ed Smith. As editor of Sherwood Press, he published books by Cooper, Flanagan, Gerstler, Tim Dlugos, Alice Notley, and others. In 1988, Trinidad relocated to New York City. He received his Master of Fine Arts from Brooklyn College in 1990. He taught at Rutgers University and The New School. In 2002, Trinidad moved to Chicago to teach at Columbia College. His personal papers are archived at Fales Library at New York University.

Trinidad’s numerous books include Plasticville, The Late Show, and Dear Prudence: New and Selected Poems. Amy Gerstler writes that Plasticville “provides readers with a model train tour of a fastidiously kept alternative world where fixation provides temporary relief from the pain and confusion of growing up human.” In her review of The Late Show in the Los Angeles Times, Lizzie Skurnick praises Trinidad as “a meticulous curator of pop-culture flotsam—silver-screen sirens, Barbie, '60s-era lip gloss—and his autobiographical verse is a graceful, merry wink to gay culture.” Assessing Dear Prudence in Bookforum, poet Ange Mlinko states, “How Trinidad molds fanboy longings into sophisticated forms, dousing them with liberal California light and his own temperamental sweetness, is his secret and his achievement.” Both Plasticville and Dear Prudence were nominated for the Lambda Literary Award in Poetry, and Plasticville was a finalist for the Lenore Marshall Poetry Prize.

In addition to his own books, Trinidad has edited several volumes of poetry, including A Fast Life: The Collected Poems of Tim Dlugos (2011), which won a Lambda Literary Award. Publishers Weekly writes, "This ambitious collection, with Trinidad's foreword and chronology, might elevate from cult status a poet who did much more than respond to his times." Trinidad's latest edited volume, Punk Rock Is Cool for the End of the World: Poems and Notebooks of Ed Smith, was published in June 2019. David L. Ulin, reviewing the book for the Los Angeles Times, describes it as "a back-and-forth between despair and aspiration, ecstasy and degradation: a lens (or set of lenses) on the shards that make a life."

With Arielle Greenberg and Tony Trigilio, Trinidad co-founded the poetry magazine Court Green in 2004. From 2004 to 2015, Court Green was published in conjunction with Columbia College, and twelve issues of the magazine appeared during that time. In 2017, Trigilio and Trinidad revived Court Green as an independent online poetry journal. Aaron Smith joined Court Green as a co-editor in 2020.

Trinidad is known for his masterful use of popular culture in his poems. The poet James Schuyler wrote, “Trinidad turns the paste jewels of pop art into the real thing.” His work is also associated with the innovative formalism of the New York School. Alice Notley has written, “There is an unwavering light in all of Trinidad’s work that turns individual words into objects, new facts.” About The Late Show (2007), The New York Times Book Review wrote that Trinidad’s “most impressive gift is an ability to dignify the dross of American life, to honor both the shrink-wrapped sentiment of the cultural artifacts he writes about and his own much more complicated emotional response to them.”

== Published works ==
- Pavane (1981)
- Monday, Monday (1985)
- Living Doll (1986)
- November (1987)
- Three Stories (1988)
- Hand Over Heart: Poems 1981–1988 (1991)
- Answer Song (1994)
- Essay with Movable Parts (1998)
- Plasticville (2000)
- Tiny Moon Notebook (2007)
- The Late Show (2007)
- Dear Prudence: New and Selected Poems (2011)
- Peyton Place: A Haiku Soap Opera (2013)
- Notes on a Past Life (2016)
- Swinging on a Star (2017)
- Coteries and Gossip: Naropa Diary, June 13–20, 2010 (2019)
- Digging to Wonderland: Memory Pieces (2022)
- Sleeping with Bashō (2024)
- Hollywood Cemetery (2025)
- New Playlist (2025)

== Collaborations ==
- A Taste of Honey (with Bob Flanagan, 1990)
- Chain Chain Chain (with Jeffery Conway and Lynn Crosbie, 2000)
- Phoebe 2002: An Essay in Verse (with Jeffery Conway and Lynn Crosbie, 2003)
- By Myself: An Autobiography (with D. A. Powell, 2009)
- Descent of the Dolls, Part I (with Jeffery Conway and Gillian McCain, 2017)

== Editor ==
- Mysteries of Afternoon and Evening by Rachel Sherwood (1981)
- Powerless: Selected Poems 1973-1990 by Tim Dlugos (1996)
- Holding Our Own: The Selected Poems of Ann Stanford (with Maxine Scates, 2001)
- Saints of Hysteria: A Half-Century of Collaborative American Poetry (with Denise Duhamel and Maureen Seaton, 2007)
- A Fast Life: The Collected Poems of Tim Dlugos (2011)
- Punk Rock Is Cool for the End of the World: Poems and Notebooks of Ed Smith (2019)
- Divining Poets: Dickinson (Emily Dickinson divination deck, 2019)
- New York Diary by Tim Dlugos (2021)

== Essays, studies ==
- Hidden in Plain Sight: On Sylvia Plath's Missing Journals (2010)
- So Much Depends: On the Particular, the Personal, & the Political (2017)
