= August 1979 =

Month of 1979

<<	August 1979					>>
Su	Mo	Tu	We	Th	Fr	Sa
			1	2	3	4
5	6	7	8	9	10	11
12	13	14	15	16	17	18
19	20	21	22	23	24	25
26	27	28	29	30	31

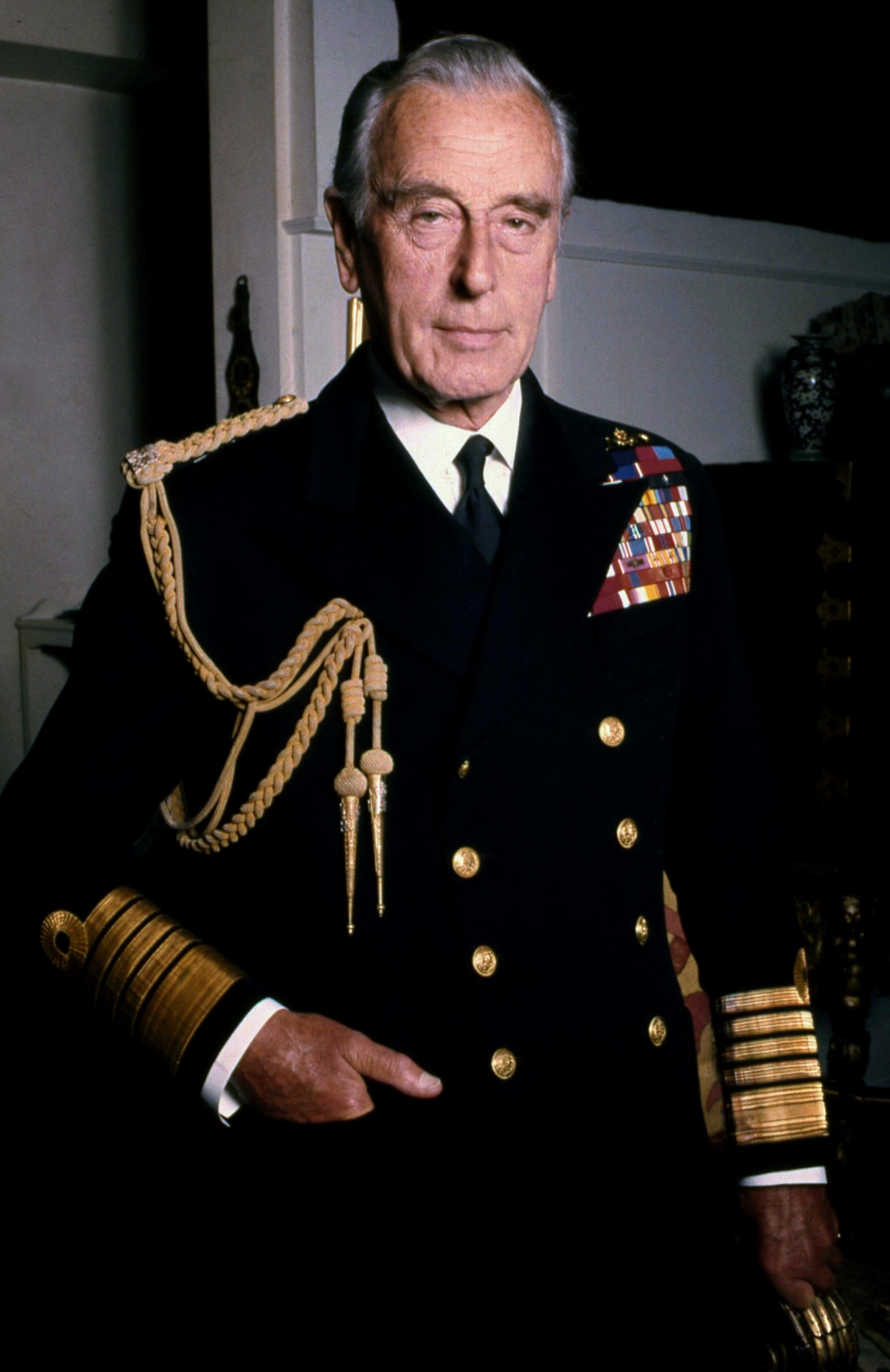
August 27, 1979: Irish terrorists assassinate Lord Mountbatten

The following events occurred in August 1979:

== August 1, 1979 (Wednesday) ==
- Maria de Lourdes Pintasilgo was sworn into office as the first female Prime Minister of Portugal, after forming a cabinet of ministers at the request of President António Ramalho Eanes.
- The government of Romania's President Nicolae Ceausescu issued an order requiring all foreign visitors to purchase gasoline using only Western European or North American currency, something unavailable to most vacationers who came to or passed through Romania to stay at beach resorts on the Black Sea. Until then, Eastern Europeans were able to use their own currencies in Romania, which would then exchange the monies with the issuing nations. In response, the neighboring Eastern European nations of Hungary and Czechoslovakia immediately barred travel to Romania. Ceaucescu reversed the order two days later.
- Italian Minister of the Treasury Filippo Maria Pandolfi, designated to become Prime Minister of Italy by President Sandro Pertini if Pandolfi could form a coalition government, announced his failure to put together a cabinet. The Italian Socialist Party had withdrawn its earlier agreement to help Pandolfi's Christian Democracy party.
- The South American nation of Bolivia swore in members of an elected Congress for the first time in more than a decade, administering the oath of office to 27 senators and 117 deputies who had won seats in the July 1 election. The new Bolivian Congress was tasked with selecting a civilian president as none of the 8 presidential candidates on July 1 had received a majority of the vote. At the time, Víctor Paz Estenssoro had the support of 64 of the 144 members of the Congress, nine short of the required 73 needed to be elected president.
- Born: Jason Momoa, American film and TV actor known for his portrayal of Aquaman; in Honolulu

== August 2, 1979 (Thursday) ==
- Major League Baseball star Thurman Munson was killed during a day off from playing for the New York Yankees, while practicing takeoffs and landings with his private jet, a Cessna Citation I. At 3:02 p.m. local time, Munson, his business partner, Jerry Anderson, and flight instructor Dave Hall were on approach for his fourth landing at the Akron-Canton Regional Airport in Ohio, had glided in too low as he approached a runway, causing his plane to strike the top of a tree and then hit a tree stump. Hall and Anderson survived the impact and a subsequent fire, while Munson broke his neck and died from smoke inhalation when the plane caught on fire. In Munson's last game, a 9 to 1 win over the Chicago White Sox the night before, he had one run after reaching first base in his lone at bat, then struck out and slightly injured his knee at his next at bat.
- The supertanker SS Atlantic Empress, insured for $85 million, sank in the Caribbean Sea along with its cargo of 275,000 tons of crude oil. The ship had been burning since July 19, when it collided with another tanker, the Aegean Captain, 20 miles (32 km) east of the island of Tobago.
- The Baltimore Orioles baseball team, controlled by Jerold Hoffberger since 1965, was purchased from Hoffberger by lawyer Edward Bennett Williams for $12,000,000.
- Died: Víctor Raúl Haya de la Torre, 84, Peruvian politician and President of the Constituent Assembly that drafted the South American republic's constitution weeks earlier.

== August 3, 1979 (Friday) ==
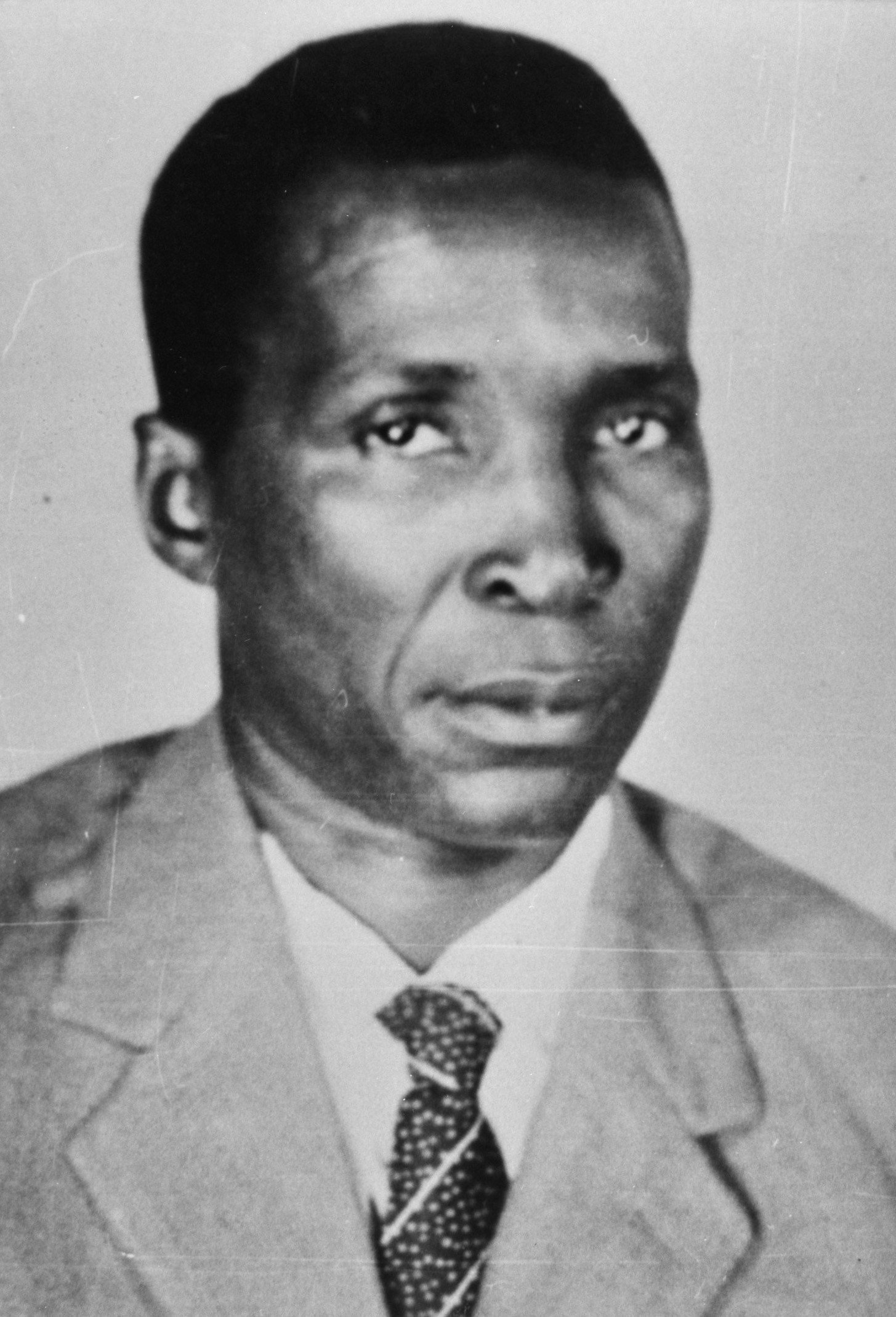
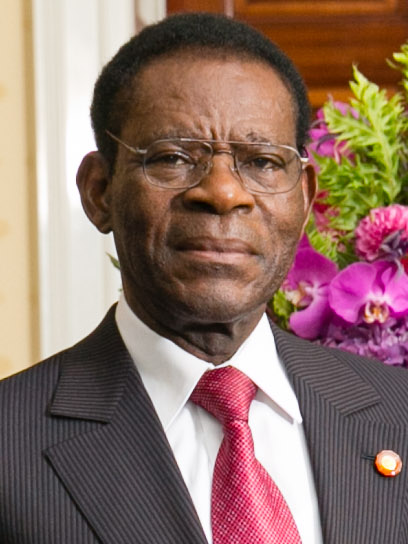
Macias and nephew Obiang
- Dictator Francisco Macías Nguema of Equatorial Guinea was overthrown in a bloody coup d'état led by his nephew, Teodoro Obiang who would begin his 42nd year in office in 2020. Macías fled the capital with forces loyal to him, but was abandoned within two weeks and captured on August 18 near his home village of Mongomo. On September 29, he and six other defendants were convicted of genocide, embezzlement and treason, and were executed by a firing squad.
- The first voting for candidates in a nationwide election in Iran since the Islamic Revolution began to choose a 73-member assembly to draft a constitution for the Islamic Republic of Iran. Candidates of the ruling Islamic Republican Party captured 55 of the 73 seats, while a number of political groups called for a boycott of the voting on the grounds that the election was "neither free nor fair".
- Born: Evangeline Lilly, Canadian TV and film actor, Screen Actors Guild award-winner for her role in the TV series Lost; in Fort Saskatchewan, Alberta
- Died:
  - Bertil Ohlin, 80, Swedish economist and recipient of the 1977 Nobel Prize in Economics
  - Alfredo Ottaviani, 88, Italian Roman Catholic cardinal and Pro-Prefect of the Congregation for the Doctrine of the Faith

== August 4, 1979 (Saturday) ==
- All 49 people on an Indian Airlines flight were killed when the turboprop airplane crashed while approaching a landing in Mumbai. The HS 748 had taken off from Pune and was flying in bad weather within the Maharashtra state when it impacted the Kiroli Hills and burst into flame.
- In the U.S. territory of Guam, a proposed new constitution was overwhelmingly rejected by voters, with almost 82% of the voters opposed to it.
- The first-ever game of the six-team American Football Bundesliga, the first German league of American football (as opposed to soccer football), was played between the Frankfurter Löwen and the Düsseldorf Panther. Playing in front of 4,000 spectators in Düsseldorf, Frankfurt won, 38 to 0. The six original teams, each of whom was scheduled to play each other twice, were the Löwen (Frankfurt Lions), the Panther (Dusseldorf Panthers), the Ansbach Grizzlies, the Berliner Bären (Berlin Bears), the Bremerhaven Seahawks and the Munich Cowboys.

== August 5, 1979 (Sunday) ==
- The Polisario Front signed a peace treaty with Mauritania. Mauritania withdrew from the Western Sahara territory it had occupied, and ceded it to the independence activists and residents who had been fighting for an independent Sahrawi Arab Democratic Republic. The victory was short-lived, however, when Morocco continued to fight the Polisario guerrillas and annexed the part of the Western Sahara vacated by Mauritania.
- An uprising by insurgents and rebels in Afghanistan against the Communist government there, began at the Bala Hissar fortress in Kabul. The rebellion and the occupation of the fortress were suppressed the same day by the Afghan military, which used aerial bombing and artillery shells to kill many of the Afghanistan Liberation Organization fighters.
- The unsuccessful Broadway musical But Never Jam Today, based on the books Alice's Adventures in Wonderland and Through the Looking-Glass children's novels by Lewis Carroll, closed five days after its first performance. The show itself was performed only eight times.
- Born:
  - Anne Polinario, Cuban-born Canadian swimmer and three-time Paralympic Games gold medalist; in Havana
  - David Healy, Northern Ireland soccer football striker and national team member; in Killyleagh, County Down
- Died:
  - Homero Hidrobo, 39, Ecuadorian musician and classical guitarist, from liver failure.
  - Christine Böhm, 25, Austrian actress, was killed in an accident while hiking near Lake Maggiore in Italy.

== August 6, 1979 (Monday) ==
- American economist Paul Volcker was sworn into office as the Chairman of the Federal Reserve Board, and would guide U.S. economic planning for more than eight years.
- Bolivia's Congress, faced with selecting a civilian president after no candidate in the July 1 popular election had received a majority of the vote, voted for Walter Guevara Arze as the nation's interim president for a one-year term until new general elections could be held.
- Died: Feodor Lynen, 68, German biochemist and recipient of the 1964 Nobel Prize in Physiology or Medicine

== August 7, 1979 (Tuesday) ==
- Author and illustrator Kit Williams buried a piece of gold jewelry, in the shape of a hare, at a public park somewhere in Great Britain, then published clues to its location in a best-selling children's book, Masquerade. Hundreds of thousands of copies of Masquerade were sold as readers went on a treasure hunt that required them to describe precisely where they believed the treasure to be located. The location was later revealed to be Ampthill Park in Ampthill, Bedfordshire in England.
- At least 22 people in Spain, including four children, were killed by a fire that swept through a set of vacation cottages at a forest near the town of Lloret de Mar in Catalonia.
- A previously undocumented species of bat, Taphozous hilli (Hill's sheath-tailed bat) was discovered in the state of Western Australia by two collectors, A. Bayness and C. G. Dawe, and confirmed in 1980 as a new species by Darrell Kitchener, who named the bat in honor of mammologist John Edwards Hill of the British Museum.
- The Ayatollah Khomeini, leader of the Islamic Republic of Iran and its highest-ranking Shia Muslim cleric, declared that the last Friday of the Muslim calendar month of Ramadan would be celebrated as the International Day of Quds to support the Palestinians of the city of Jerusalem, historically referred to as Al-Quds (literally "The Holy City") among Arabs. The unofficial holiday was instituted as a response to Israel's celebration of Jerusalem Day, observed on the 28th day of the Jewish calendar month of Iyar. The first Quds Day was observed on Friday, the 24th day of Ramadan 1399 A.H. (August 17, 1979 on the Christian calendar). The most recent Israeli Jerusalem Day had been observed on Friday, May 25, 1979.
- Roman Catholic Archbishop Raymond-Marie Tchidimbo of the west African nation of Guinea was released from prison after being incarcerated at Camp Boiro for more than eight years. The commutation of Tchidimbo's life sentence was the result of negotiations between the Vatican and the government of Guinean President Sekou Toure. Archbishop Tchidimbo resigned from his position as Archbishop of Conakry on August 13 after having flown to Rome.
- The Commonwealth Heads of Government Meeting 1979 closed in Lusaka, the capital of Zambia, at the end of seven days of discussions between the leaders of 39 nations that were members of the British Commonwealth (the United Kingdom and independent nations that had once been part of the British Empire). The leaders issued the Lusaka Declaration of the Commonwealth on Racism and Racial Prejudice
- Born:
  - Benjamin Wallfisch, British composer of film scores; in London
  - Abigail Spanberger, former U.S. CIA agent and current U.S. Representative (D-Va.); in Red Bank, New Jersey

== August 8, 1979 (Wednesday) ==
- Two American commercial divers, Richard Walker and Victor Guiel, died of hypothermia after their diving bell became stranded at a depth of over 160 metres (520 ft) in the East Shetland Basin. The legal repercussions of the accident would lead to important safety changes in the diving industry.
- A landslide destroyed 69 of the roughly 400 houses in Abbotsford, New Zealand, a suburb of Dunedin. Heavy rains had been causing a nearby hillside to begin shifting and, at 9:07 in the evening, the hill gave way. Some of the homes were buried, while others were damaged beyond repair and later torn down. While hundreds of residents were displaced, there were only minor injuries.
- Wálter Guevara was sworn in as the caretaker President of Bolivia after the Bolivian Congress was unable to come to an agreement on a winner of the 1979 presidential election. Guevara, president of the Bolivian Senate, would remain in office for less than three months until being overthrown on November 1 in a military coup d'etat.
- Died:
  - Nicholas Monsarrat, 69, British novelist
  - Dr. Musa Mirmammad oglu Abdullayev, 51, Soviet dissident and Azerbaijani hematologist
  - David J. McDonald, 76, American labor leader who was president of the United Steelworkers of America from 1952 to 1965

== August 9, 1979 (Thursday) ==
- King Hassan II of Morocco ordered the removal of all Moroccan Army troops from Mauritania, where they had been offering protection from the Polisario Front guerrillas during the annexation of the Western Sahara by Mauritania and Morocco.
- The American Federal Bureau of Investigation suffered its worst loss of life in its 71-year history as three FBI agents were shot in two unrelated incidents. Johnnie L. Oliver, one of six agents sent to a housing project to arrest a fugitive, was killed in Cleveland, Ohio. Ninety minutes later, in El Centro, California, a former federal employee walked into the local FBI office, shot J. Robert Porter and Charles W. Elmore, and then killed himself.
- In fiction, the climactic events of the 1980 film The Blues Brothers take place on this date.
- Raymond Washington, co-founder of the Crips, today one of the largest, most notorious gangs in the United States, was killed in a drive-by shooting in Los Angeles. The killers were never identified.
- Died: Walter O'Malley, 75, American sports executive who moved the Brooklyn Dodgers to Los Angeles in 1958 to bring Major League Baseball to the U.S. west coast

== August 10, 1979 (Friday) ==
- The Indian Space Research Organisation made its first satellite launch from its own space facility in Italy, the Satish Dhawan Space Centre in Sriharikota in the state of Andhra Pradesh. Rohini 1A was launched by an ISRO Satellite Launch Vehicle but its orbit decayed after nine days and it re-entered the Earth's atmosphere on August 19.
- Jaime Roldós Aguilera took office as the new President of Ecuador. Roldós would be killed in an airplane crash less than two years later.
- Michael Jackson released his breakthrough album Off the Wall. It sold 7 million copies in the United States alone, making it a 7-time platinum album.
- Born:
  - JoAnna Garcia, American TV actress; in Tampa, Florida
  - Shabir Ahluwalia, Indian TV actor; in Mumbai
  - Ted Geoghegan, American filmmaker; in Beaverton, Oregon
  - Hwang Woo-seul-hye, South Korean film and TV actress; in Seoul
- Died: Dick Foran, 69, American film and TV actor

== August 11, 1979 (Saturday) ==
- The collapse of the Machchu-2 dam killed at least 1,800 people in the Indian state of Gujarat as the Machchu River rushed down on the city of Morbi, destroying or irreparably damaging more than half of the buildings with a 20 foot (6.1 m) high wall of water. Some estimates placed the number of deaths at as much as 25,000.
- The mid-air collision of two Soviet Tu-134A jet airliners killed all 178 people on both planes. Aeroflot Flight 7628, a Tu-134 passenger jet with 88 passengers and six crew was flying southwest from Voronezh in the Russian SFSR to the Moldavian SSR city of Kishinev (now Chișinău in Moldova), while Aeroflot Flight 7880 was flying northwest from Donetsk in the Ukrainian SSR to Minsk in the Byelorussian SSR when the two planes collided at an altitude of 8,400 metres (27,600 ft) after a mistake by an air traffic controller. The wreckage came down on the Dnipropetrovsk Oblast of the Ukrainian SSR. Killed in the crash of the plane from Donetsk was Tashkent's Pakhtakor soccer football team, which had been scheduled to play against the team at Minsk; the government newspaper Izvestia reported on August 14 that the game was postponed, without mentioning the plane crash. Four days after the disaster, the official Soviet news agency TASS reported it nationwide, with the statement that the two airliners "suffered a catastrophe" and that there were no survivors.
- Mauritania, which had taken split control of the Western Sahara with Morocco in 1975 and named the southern portion Tiris al-Gharbiyya, ceded control of the former Spanish colony to Morocco.
- Shehu Shagari finished first among five candidates in the first presidential election in Nigeria, with almost 5.7 million votes and more than one third of those cast. Obafemi Awolowo finished second with 4.9 million votes.
- The FA Charity Shield, an annual soccer football match in England between the most recent winners of the regular season championship of The Football League and the FA Cup winner, was held at Wembley Stadium before a crowd of 92,800. Liverpool, the League champion, defeated Cup winner Arsenal, 3 to 1.
- Dinamo Tbilisi won the Soviet Cup soccer football competition, defeating Dynamo Moscow on a penalty shoot-out after the match had finished on a 0 to 0 draw after extra time. Tbilisi made all five of its penalty kicks, while Dynamo Moscow had missed one.
- Born: Drew Nelson, Canadian TV actor; in Etobicoke, Ontario
- Died:
  - Antonina Makarova, 59, Soviet Russian war criminal and collaborator with Germany, was executed by a firing squad three years after she had been located by the KGB after more than 30 years of eluding discovery. Makarova was only the third woman to be legally executed in the Soviet Union after the end of the Stalin era.
  - Robert Martinson, 52, American sociologist and prison reform advisor, killed himself by jumping from the 15th floor of the apartment building where he lived.

== August 12, 1979 (Sunday) ==
- The government of Italy's Prime Minister Francesco Cossiga won a vote of confidence in the Italian Senate, 153 to 118, a day after winning the vote in the Chamber of Deputies, 287 to 242. Cossiga's formation of a three-party coalition of his Christian Democracy party, Social Democrats and Liberals and its approval by both houses of Parliament ended more than six months after the resignation of Giulio Andreotti and his cabinet on January 31.
- Sugar Ray Leonard won his first professional boxing title, the North American Boxing Federation (NABF) welterweight championship, by knocking out NABF champion Pete Ranzany in the fourth round of a bout at Caesars Palace in Las Vegas. The win made Leonard eligible to compete for the World Boxing Council welterweight title, which he would win three months later on November 30 by defeating previously unbeaten WBC champion Wilfred Benítez in a 15th round TKO.
- Born:
  - Cindy Klassen, Canadian speed skater and Olympic gold medalist; in Winnipeg
  - Boris "Bobi" Tsankov, Bulgarian journalist and writer of true crime books; in Sofia (shot to death 2010)
- Died: Ernst Chain, 73, German-born British biochemist and co-recipient of the 1945 Nobel Prize in Physiology or Medicine

== August 13, 1979 (Monday) ==
- The collapse of the wood frame roof of the Rosemont Horizon arena in the Chicago suburb of Rosemont, Illinois killed five construction workers and injured 16 others. At 8:30 in the morning, the roof broke apart while 26 workers were on top of it. A subsequent investigation determined that less than half of the connection bolts necessary for the frame had been in place, and of 944 girder bolts required for the connections, 500 had not been put in place and another 106 were not properly fastened.
- American smugglers who had been paid to transport 18 refugees from Haiti to Florida in the United States, ordered all the passengers off of the boat at gunpoint roughly 450 yards (410 m) from shore, and threw others overboard. Five children and a young mother drowned, and 12 others survived and were rescued. Deputies of the sheriff's department of Palm Beach County, Florida witnessed the incident and arrested the two boat operators on charges of six counts of murder.
- Mehdi Araghi, director of the Qasr Prison in Iran for the Ayatollah Khomeini, was assassinated.
- South African Prime Minister P. W. Botha signed a proclamation granting legislative powers to the National Assembly of South-West Africa for partial self-government of the future nation of Namibia, at the time under the control of the white minority government of South Africa under a United Nations mandate.

== August 14, 1979 (Tuesday) ==
- A freak storm killed 15 sailors who were competing in the Fastnet Race in the United Kingdom. More than 300 boats were in the English Channel and the Irish Sea to compete in the race, organized by the Royal Ocean Racing Club when unexpected gale-force winds arose on the fourth day of the race, which had started on August 12 from the Isle of Wight on a 605 mi (974 km) course to Plymouth at Cornwall.
- Died: Abuna Theophilos, 69, former Patriarch of the Ethiopian Orthodox Church, was executed by strangulation carried out on orders of the Ethiopian government.

== August 15, 1979 (Wednesday) ==
- James Dallas Egbert III, a 16-year old prodigy at Michigan State University and enthusiast of the fantasy role-playing game Dungeons & Dragons, disappeared mysteriously after last being seen entering the steam tunnels that ran underground beneath the MSU campus. Although Egbert's whereabouts were discovered after a month, the press coverage of the mystery captured national attention in the U.S. and would later be the basis for a book, The Dungeon Master.
- Apocalypse Now, Francis Ford Coppola's Oscar-winning film set during the Vietnam War, premiered nationwide in the United States and Canada.
- The popular Telugu language action film Judagadu premiered in India.
- Born:
  - Carl Edwards, American stock car race driver and 2007 NASCAR Busch Series champion; in Columbia, Missouri
  - Zelimkhan Khangoshvili, Chechen nationalist who fought against Russia during the Second Chechen War; in Duisi, Georgian SSR, Soviet Union (assassinated 2019)
  - Peter Shukoff, American musician and internet personality; in Rochester, New York
- Died: David Rein, 65, American defense attorney for victims of McCarthyism.

== August 16, 1979 (Thursday) ==
- The first confirmed birth of octuplets with infants surviving long enough to be taken home took place in Naples. Pasqualina Chianese gave birth to eight babies, two of whom survived. Six of the children died within two weeks of their birth, but Silvania Chianese was released on November 2 at age 11 weeks. Her sister Anna Chianese was released later in November.
- Shehu Shagari of the Great Nigeria People's Party was certified as the winner of the 1979 Nigerian presidential election, over the protests of the other three candidates in the election, despite early returns that showed Chief Obafemi Awolowo of the Unity Party to have the lead. Under the rules set by the electoral commission established by the military, the winning candidate was required to receive at least 25 percent of the vote in at least 13 of the 19 states of Nigeria and to have received the most votes overall, and the other candidates asserted that Shagari had at least 25 percent in only 12 states, falling short in Kano. Oyeleye Oyediran, The Nigerian 1979 Elections (Macmillan Nigeria, 1981). Awolowo filed a lawsuit after the national Election Tribunal dismissed his objections, and the Supreme Court of Nigeria would rule in Shagari's favor on September 26.
- Died:
  - John G. Diefenbaker, 83, Prime Minister of Canada from 1957 to 1963
  - Dr. Walter Schultze, 85, physician and Nazi German government official who set the policies of German universities from 1935 to 1943 as Reichsdozentenführer and was later convicted of war crimes for his participation in the Aktion T4 involuntary euthanasia of people in mental institutions.

== August 17, 1979 (Friday) ==
- The controversial film Monty Python's Life of Brian, a satire of the Christian religion, premiered in the United States. It would make its British debut on November 8.
- Orlando Serrell, a 10-year-old African-American boy, was struck on the left side of his head by a baseball while playing and became an acquired savant, gaining the ability to retain memories of every day since the accident.
- The last issue of the British weekly tabloid Reveille was published.
- Died: Vivian Vance (stage name for Vivian Roberta Jones), 70, American TV actress and Emmy Award winner for her portrayal of Ethel Mertz on I Love Lucy

== August 18, 1979 (Saturday) ==
- In Iran, the Ayatollah Khomeini declared himself commander-in-chief of Iran's military and ordered the nation's armed forces to crush the Kurdish rebellion within 24 hours.
- Six teenagers, ranging in age from 15 to 18, were killed after being run over by another car while watching a drag race near Orlando, Florida.

== August 19, 1979 (Sunday) ==
- The People's Revolutionary Tribunal of Cambodia reached a verdict, in absentia, convicting former Khmer Rouge leaders Pol Pot and Ieng Sary of genocide, and sentenced them to death. The sentences were never carried out and Pol Pot and Ieng Sary would die of natural causes in 1998 and 2013, respectively.
- Soviet cosmonauts Valery Ryumin and Vladimir Lyakhov returned to Earth after a record 175 days in outer space. Ryumin and Lyakhov had been on the Salyut 6 space station since February 25 after being launched on Soyuz 32, and had been scheduled to return on April 11, but the replacement crew on Soyuz 33 had been unable to dock with the station. Soyuz 34, an unmanned craft, was then sent to bring them home.
- Died:
  - Friedrich Wilhelm Bautz, 72, German Protestant theologian and writer
  - Saad Jumaa, 63, Prime Minister of Jordan during the Six-Day War in 1967 when Jordan lost the West Bank and East Jerusalem to Israel in fighting.
  - Mary Millington, 33, English model and pornographic film actress, committed suicide.
  - Joel Teitelbaum, 92, Austrian-born American Hasidic Jewish Grand Rebbe of the Satmar dynasty
  - Vladimir Tretyakov, 26, Soviet Russian serial killer who murdered seven women in Arkhangelsk, was executed by a firing squad.

== August 20, 1979 (Monday) ==
- The Iranian Army began its siege of the Kurdish city of Mahabad to combat Kurdish nationalists and surrounded the city within 10 days. The city would fall on September 3 after the failure of negotiations.
- Born:
  - Jamie Cullum, British jazz singer, in Rochford, Essex
  - Tavito Nanao, Japanese singer-songwriter; in Kōchi, Kōchi Prefecture, Shikoku island
  - Kimberly Stewart, American fashion designer and model, daughter of Rod Stewart and Alana Stewart; in Los Angeles

== August 21, 1979 (Tuesday) ==
- The Lagos Accord was signed in the capital of Nigeria, by representatives of 11 warring factions to bring an end to the civil war in the African nation of Chad after 14 years of fighting. Under the accord, the parties agreed to a Transitional Government of National Unity (Gouvernement d'Union Nationale de Transition or GUNT) with Goukouni Oueddei as President, Wadel Abdelkader Kamougué as Vice President and former Prime Minister Hissène Habré as Defense Minister. A peacekeeping force was supplied by the Organisation of African Unity from three neighboring nations to enforce the Accord, but fighting between the forces of Habré and Oueddei would break out five months later.
- Alexander Godunov, the principal male dancer with the Soviet Union's Bolshoi Ballet, defected to the United States while the ballet troupe was in New York City. His wife Lyudmila Vlasova was placed on Aeroflot Flight 316 to Moscow, which was stopped from taking off until U.S. authorities determined after three days that Vlasova was sincere in her wish to return to the USSR. Vlasova and the 52 other passengers and crew had remained on the jetliner for 72 hours, refusing to get back out of the plane after boarding. The Soviet press agency TASS did not acknowledge Godunov's defection and informed Soviet citizens that Godunov had "disappeared under circumstances which are not yet clear."
- The head-on collision of a freight train and a passenger train in Thailand killed almost 50 people and injured more than 100, near the Taling Chan railway station on the other side of the Chao Phraya River from Bangkok.
- A group of 17 men and six women arrived in Cairo as part of the first tour group from Israel to visit Egypt. Although people with Israeli passports had been allowed to visit for business purposes since December, 1977, the Tourolam Ltd. agency of Tel Aviv was the first to bring Israelis to Egypt for a vacation.

== August 22, 1979 (Wednesday) ==
- An annular solar eclipse was visible from Antarctica, south Pacific.
- United States Representative Michael "Ozzie" Myers, a Democrat from Pennsylvania, traveled to a room in the TraveLodge hotel near the Kennedy Airport in New York, where he met with two representatives of a company called Abdul Enterprises which was seeking to obtain a license to open a casino. Myers accepted a bribe of $50,000 in cash from one of the representatives, Tony DeVito, in return for introducing the sheikhs to influential friends, then made the statement "Money talks in this business and bullshit walks," adding "and it works the same way down in Washington." On February 2, 1980, Myers would learn that DeVito was actually an undercover FBI agent, Anthony Amoroso, who was participating in the FBI's Abscam investigation of political corruption. Myers was expelled from the House of Representatives later in 1980 after being convicted of bribery.
- India's President Neelam Sanjiva Reddy dissolved the Lok Sabha, lower house of India's parliament, and announced that new elections would be held in November.
- Died: James T. Farrell, 75, American novelist known for his series of books that created the character Studs Lonigan

== August 23, 1979 (Thursday) ==
- The Baltic Appeal, a petition to the leaders of the Soviet Union from residents the three republics of the USSR that had been created from the annexation of the independent nations of Latvia, Lithuania and Estonia, was sent the Soviet Communist Party leadership, with copies to the leaders of the United Nations, East Germany, West Germany, the United Kingdom and the United States. Signed by 45 independence activists led by Latvian Ints Cālītis, Lithuanian Vytautas Bogušis and Estonian Enn Tarto, the document sought the independence of the Baltic states and a public disclosure and annulment of the Molotov–Ribbentrop pact signed by the foreign ministers of the USSR and Nazi Germany in 1939.

== August 24, 1979 (Friday) ==
- Polisario Front guerrillas in the Moroccan-occupied Western Sahara captured a desert outpost of the Army of Morocco and killed 230 Moroccan soldiers in a surprise attack on the garrison of Labyar (formerly Lebuirate). The garrison was recaptured by reinforcements from Morocco the next day.
- The Facts of Life began a nine-season run on U.S. television as a situation comedy set at an all-girls boarding school. The show, starring Charlotte Rae, was a spin-off from NBC's successful Diff'rent Strokes.
- The B-52s new wave band performed a concert in Boston that would be recorded as a live album and released as Live! 8-24-1979.
- Born: Elva Hsiao (Xiao Ya-chih), Taiwanese pop music star; in Taoyuan City
- Died:
  - Hanna Reitsch, 67, German aviator and test pilot who was the first woman to pilot a rocket plane (the Me 163) and the first woman to pilot a jet aircraft (the Me 262 and the He 162)
  - Ahmad Daouk, 87, Prime Minister of Lebanon during the French Mandate in World War II and then for eight weeks in 1960

== August 25, 1979 (Saturday) ==
- The new Sandinista government of Nicaragua issued an order banning anyone from entering the Central American nation and another order voiding the value of the higher denominations of the currency, the córdoba. Citizens were given Saturday and Sunday to turn in any notes, valued at 50 córdobas or 100 córdobas, in exchange for special certificates that could be exchanged for newly printed notes within six months, along with 8 percent interest. The action was taken after the new government discovered that 200 million córdobas worth of notes had been stolen from Nicaragua's central bank by officials of the regime of Anastasio Somoza Debayle prior to their departure from the country. Under the order, Nicaragua reopened its borders and allowed incoming flights and ships on Monday and forbade any further exchange of the old notes.
- Voters in the African nation of Somalia overwhelmingly approved a new constitution with a reported result of 3,597,592 out of 3,605,490 voters in favor.
- Prime Minister Abel T. Muzorewa of Zimbabwe Rhodesia announced in a speech that the former white-ruled nation of Rhodesia would be known exclusively as Zimbabwe in time for his travel to London to represent the nation in constitutional negotiations. A Reuters press release commented "The announcement means that for the first time since 1890, all reference to Cecil John Rhodes, the British explorer who organized the first white settlements, will be eradicated from the region's name.
- The romance/mystery television series Hart to Hart, starring Robert Wagner and Stefanie Powers as a husband and wife pair of detectives, premiered on the ABC television network in the U.S. and began a five-season run.
- Died:
  - Stan Kenton, 67, American jazz musician and orchestra leader
  - Ray Eberle, 60, American big band music singer for the Glenn Miller Orchestra
  - Alberto Ruz Lhuillier, 73, Mexican archaeologist
  - Maria Bird, 88, South African-born British TV producer and founder of BBC Children's Television

== August 26, 1979 (Sunday) ==
- The first four special economic zones (SEZs) in the People's Republic of China were officially established with the approval of the Chinese Communist Party to allow flexible free market policies rather than a planned economy in areas to attract domestic and foreign investment, along with tax incentives. The special zones were located in the port cities of Shenzhen, Shantou and Zhuhai in Guangdong Province, and the city of Xiamen in Fujian Province.
- Died:
  - Alvin Karpis (Albin Karpavicius), 72, Canadian-American gangster who led the Barker–Karpis gang in the 1930s
  - Mika Waltari, 70, Finnish novelist and screenwriter
  - U.S. Army Air Corps Colonel Philip G. Cochran, 69, American war hero known as the inspiration for two comic strip characters in the Milton Caniff features. Cochran was reimagined in Terry and the Pirates as pilot "Flip Corkin" and in Steve Canyon as "General Philerie".

== August 27, 1979 (Monday) ==
- Lord Mountbatten, who was a retired admiral in the Royal Navy and the uncle of Prince Philip of the United Kingdom, was assassinated along with his grandson and another teenager when the Provisional Irish Republican Army exploded a bomb underneath the boat they had boarded. Lord Mountbatten was on holiday at his summer home in Mullaghmore, County Sligo in the Republic of Ireland. He had been the last British Governor-General of India during its transition to independence, and had later been the First Sea Lord and the Chief of the Defence Staff. Mountbatten was aboard his fishing boat, Shadow V, along with six other people, unaware that IRA member Thomas McMahon had planted a radio-controlled explosive onboard the night before. Mountbatten, along with his 14-year-old grandson Nicholas Knatchbull and a 15-year-old Irish boy, Paul Maxwell, were killed instantly. Doreen Knatchbull, Baroness Brabourne, died the next day from her injuries. Injured were Mountbatten's daughter (and Nicholas's mother), Patricia; her husband John Knatchbull, Lord Brabourne; and her other son, Timothy Knatchbull. The IRA took responsibility for the act, stating that it "was a discriminate act to bring to the attention of the English people the continuing occupation of our country," and adding that the British Army "cannot defeat us, but yet it continues with the oppression of our people and torture of our comrades in H Block. Well, for this we will tear out their sentimental imperialist hearts." McMahon and Francis McGirl had been arrested by Irish police at a roadblock east of Mullaghmore, two hours before the assassination, "by a constable making a routine antiterrorist check" and were charged two days later while still in police custody.
- The Warrenpoint ambush was carried out by the Provisional IRA, killing 18 British soldiers in two separate attacks in County Down in Northern Ireland. At 4:40 in the afternoon, a convoy of soldiers of the 2nd Battalion of the Parachute Regiment was passing the Narrow Water Castle on the A2 road near Warrenpoint. An 800 lb (360 kg) roadside bomb was detonated as the last truck in the line passed it, killing six paratroopers and the driver. Half an hour later, at 5:12 in the evening, a second bomb was set off at a command station set up by the British Army to respond to the first blast. The second explosion killed 10 paratroopers and Lt. Col. David Blair and one of his subordinates of the Queen's Own Highlanders.
- In advance of transforming his Atlanta UHF television station into the nucleus of a worldwide cable television network, Ted Turner changed the call letters of WTCG Channel 17 to WTBS, for Turner Broadcasting System, transmitted by satellite communication at low cost to U.S. cable television providers.
- Rolando Cubela Secades was released from a prison in Cuba after serving 13 1/2 years of a 25-year prison sentence for his role in working with the Central Intelligence Agency of the U.S. in a plot to assassinate Cuban premier Fidel Castro. Cubela, who had fought alongside Castro in the Cuban Revolution and then become disenchanted with the establishment of a dictatorship, was pardoned by Castro and went into exile in Spain.
- Born:
  - Aaron Paul (stage name for Aaron Paul Sturtevant) Emmy-award winning TV actor; in Emmett, Idaho
  - Justine Pasek, Ukrainian-born model who represented Panama and was crowned Miss Universe in 2002; in Kharkov, Ukrainian SSR, Soviet Union
  - Tian Liang, Chinese diver, Olympic gold medalist (2000 and 2004) and three-time world champion; in Chongqing

== August 28, 1979 (Tuesday) ==
- President João Figueiredo of Brazil signed an amnesty law to forgive the convictions of everyone convicted in the South American nation for political crimes during the military dictatorship between 1961 and 1978. The law cleared the way for as many as 5,000 exiles to come back home.
- A train wreck in the Netherlands killed seven passengers and the driver of Train 4635 at Nijmegen, and injured 36 others.
- A concert by a British Army band, in Grand-Place of Brussels, capital of Belgium, was the target of the explosion of a terrorist bomb that injured seven band members and 11 spectators. The bomb, planted beneath a makeshift stage, exploded at 3:00 in the afternoon, before the concert was scheduled to start. Most members of the band had stepped off the stage so that they could change into their uniforms. The Irish Republican Army took credit for the act.
- The Makaton computer programming language was trademarked in the United Kingdom as part of its introduction to the market as a form of communication for people with disabilities. The word was derived from the names of the developers, Margaret Walker, Katherine Johnston and Tony Cornforth.
- Died: Konstantin Simonov, 63, Soviet Russian novelist and playwright

== August 29, 1979 (Wednesday) ==
- All 63 people aboard Aeroflot Flight 5484 were killed as the Tupolev Tu-124 jet went out of control and disintegrated while flying from Kiev in the Ukrainian SSR to Kazan in the Russian SFSR. One hour after takeoff, the airplane tumbled from 27,000 feet (8,200 m) to less than 10,000 feet (3,000 m) and fell apart, causing the debris to scatter over a large area near Inokovka.
- U.S. Army Captain Jeffrey R. MacDonald was convicted of the February 17, 1970 murder of his wife and two young daughters four years after his indictment by a federal grand jury in North Carolina.
- A national referendum was held in Somalia to approve a new liberal constitution, promulgated by President Siad Barre.
- Born: Juthavachara Vivacharawongse, eldest son of King Vajiralongkorn of Thailand; in Bangkok

== August 30, 1979 (Thursday) ==
- In the first known instance of a comet colliding with the Sun, Comet Howard–Koomen–Michels made impact after being last observed approaching the Sun at 9:14 p.m. UTC (1979 08 30.885).
- Born:
  - Ulukbek Maripov, Prime Minister of Kyrgyzstan, February to May 2021, Chairman of the Cabinet of Ministers of Kyrgyzstan) after the Prime Minister position was abolished from May to October 2021; in Kyrgyz-Ata, Kirghiz SSR, Soviet Union
  - Tavia Yeung (Yeung Sin-yiu), Hong Kong TV actress and TVB Award-winner
  - Niki Chow, Hong Kong TV actress and singer
  - Girish Khatiwada, Nepalese radio and TV personality; in Biratnagar
  - Lisa Lynch, British journalist who wrote a daily report of her bout with cancer from 2008 until her death; in Derby, Derbyshire (d. 2013)
- Died: Jean Seberg, 40, American film actress, vanished after telling friends that she was going to watch a movie. Her body was discovered on September 8 in the back of her car, along with a bottle of barbiturates and a suicide note.

== August 31, 1979 (Friday) ==
- The United States opened its Consulate in Guangzhou (Canton), almost 30 years after the previous American consulate in Canton had closed in 1949 after the Communist Revolution in the People's Republic of China. Richard L. Williams, who had served in the consulate in Hong Kong, became the new American consul in the offices, which occupied the 11th floor of the Dongfeng Hotel. A second American consulate would open in Shanghai in 1980.
- The Australian Defence Force activated its first permanent Tactical Assault Group (TAG), a special forces unit within the Special Air Service Regiment trained to respond to incidents of terrorism.
- Spokesman Hodding Carter III of the U.S. Department of State announced that the U.S. had discovered the presence of at least 2,000 Soviet combat troops in Cuba, commenting that "This is the first time we have been able to confirm the presence of a Soviet ground forces unit on the island," but added that the presence "poses no threat to the United States" and was not a violation of any agreement to ban offensive weapons from Cuba.
- For the first time, a leader of South Africa's white-minority government visited Soweto, the impoverished and massive black ghetto in Johannesburg. Prime Minister P. W. Botha toured the area along with six members of his cabinet, and spoke to a black audience as a guest of the Soweto township council.
- Born: Yuvan Shankar Raja, award-winning Indian film score composer and songwriter; in Madras (now Chennai), Tamil Nadu state
- Died: Sally Rand, 75, American actress and burlesque dancer famous in the 1920s and 1930s for her suggestive fan dance and, later, the bubble dance.
