= Kyrgyz-Ata Nature Park =

National park in Kyrgyzstan

- Kyrgyz: Кыргыз-Ата мамлекеттик жаратылыш паркы
- IUCN category II (national park)
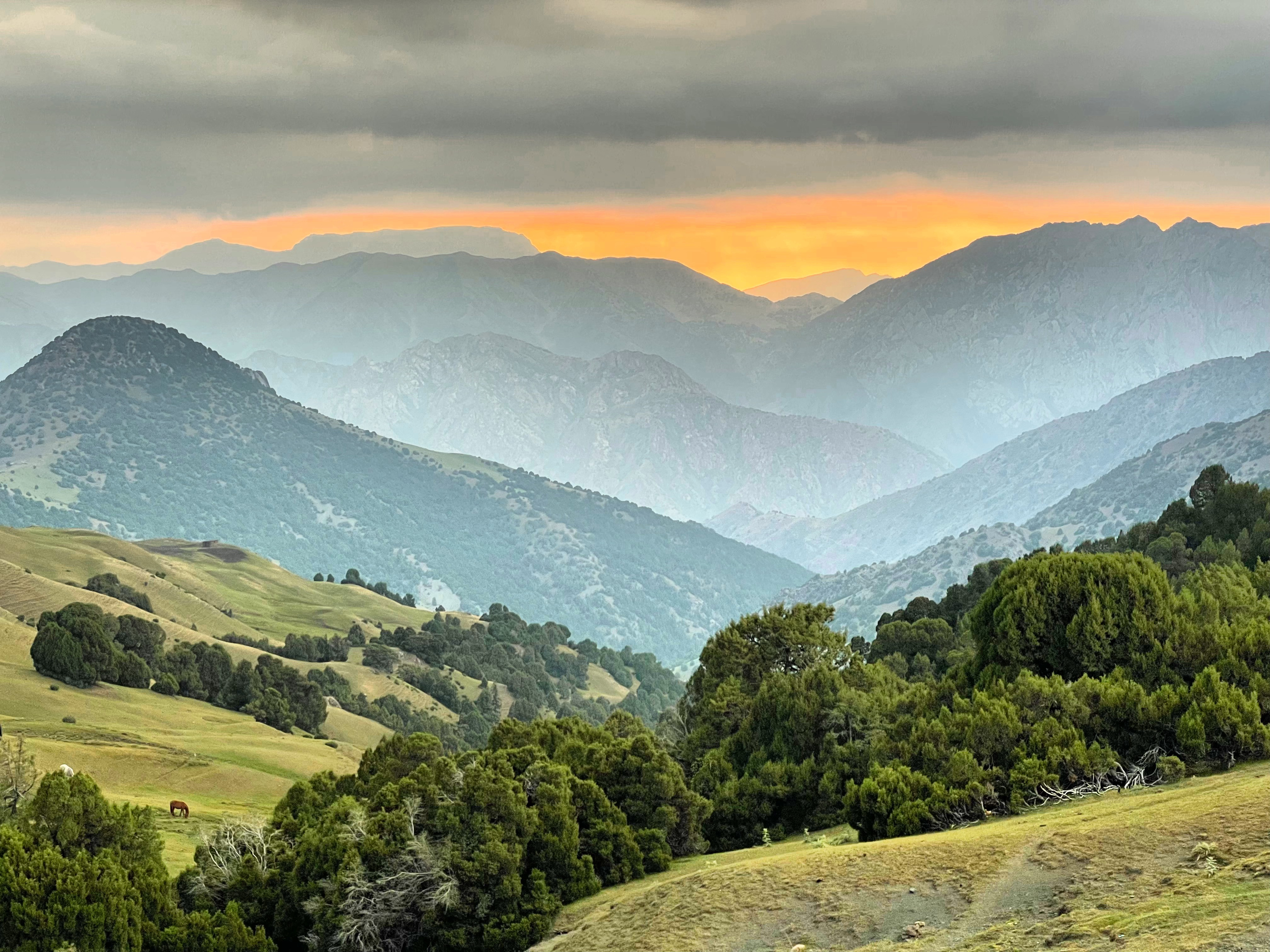

- Location within Kyrgyzstan
- Location: Nookat District, Osh Region, Kyrgyzstan
- Coordinates: 40°03′N 72°36′E
- Area: 11,172 ha (27,610 acres)
- Established: 1992

Kyrgyz-Ata Nature Park (Kyrgyz: Кыргыз-Ата мамлекеттик жаратылыш паркы) is a national park in Nookat District of Osh Region of Kyrgyzstan, established in March 1992. It covers 11,172 hectares. The purpose of the park is conservation of the valuable unique nature complex of juniper forests of special ecological, aesthetic, geobotanical and faunal value, as well as recreation.

The park is located 40 km from Osh, on the northern slopes of the Alay Range and in the basin of the river Kyrgyz-Ata (a tributary of the Aravansay), which flows from the northern slope of the Kichik-Alay ridge, whose rocks are composed of limestone with outcrops of multicolored marble.
