= Musa Mirmammad oglu Abdullayev =

Azerbaijani medical doctor (1927–1979)

Musa Abdullayev
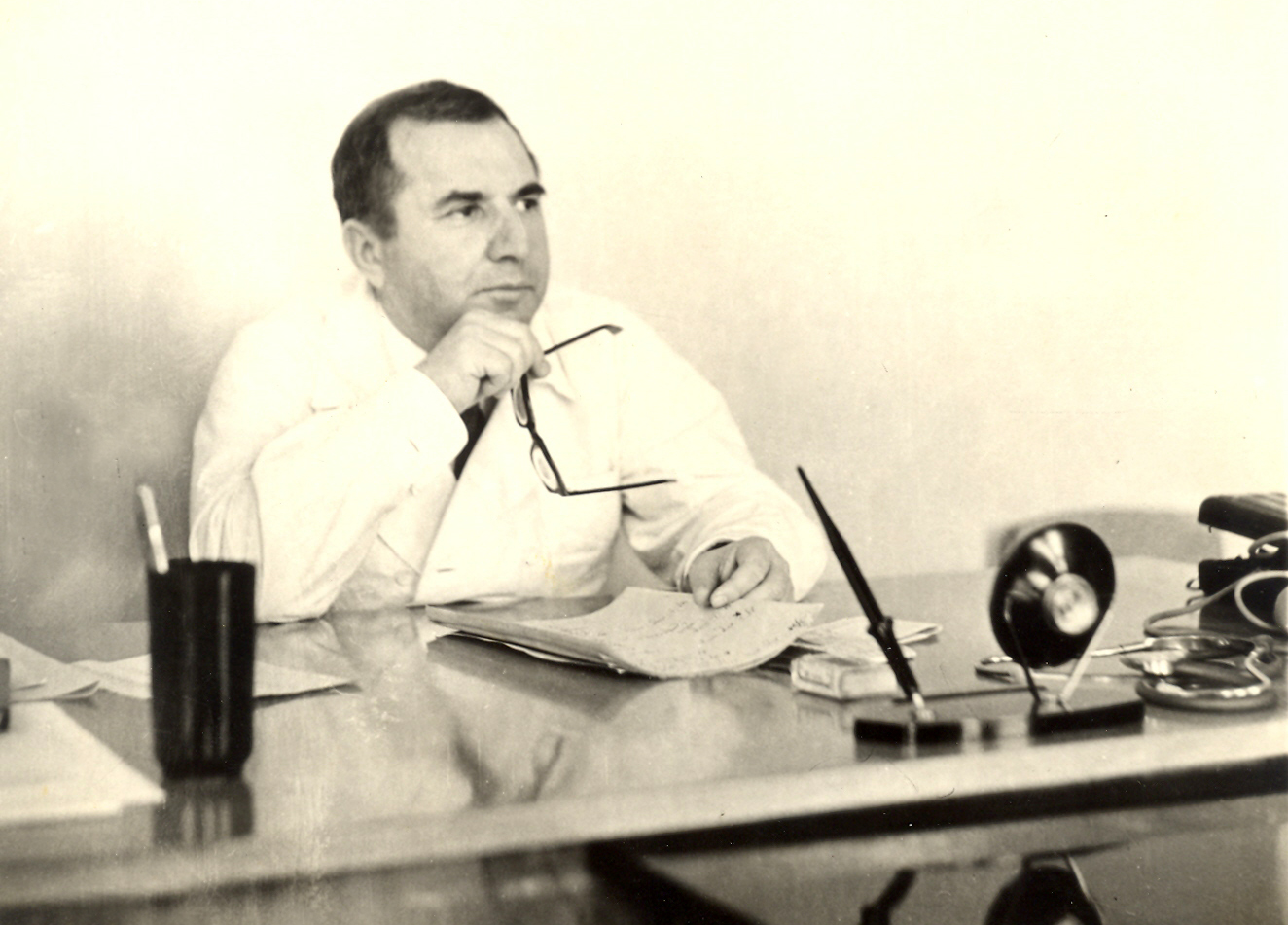
- Born: 27 November 1927; Masalli district, Azerbaijan SSR, Soviet Union
- Died: 8 August 1979 (aged 51); Baku, Azerbaijan SSR, Soviet Union
- Citizenship: Soviet Union
- Education: Azerbaijan State Medical Institute, Azerbaijan State Pedagogical Institute of Foreign Languages
- Scientific career
- Fields: Hematology, Cardiology
- Doctoral advisor: Fuad Efendiyev

Musa Mirmammad oglu Abdullayev (27 November 1927, Masallı district, Azerbaijan SSR, USSR — 8 August 1979, Baku, Azerbaijan SSR) was a prominent Azerbaijani hematologist, doctor of medicine, professor, and philologist-translator. He was one of the eight members of the anti-Soviet nationalist student-youth political organization "Lightning" (İldırım), formed for the independence of Azerbaijan within 1942–1944.

== Life ==
Musa Mirmammad oglu Abdullayev was born on 27 November 1927, in Gizilagaj village of Masalli region in an intellectual family. His English and Russian were fluent even since high school. The fact that he took a lesson in English from Zinin, a prominent German physician of the time, living in the village of Slavyanka in Gadabay district was a great stimulus for him to understand events more deeply and an important condition for the radiance of his talent as a translator. When he was a schoolboy, his father, Mirmammad Abdullayev, moved to Baku with his family due to civil service. After graduating from high school with honors, he graduated from the treatment and prevention faculty of the Azerbaijan State Medical Institute, as well as the English language faculty of the Azerbaijan State Pedagogical Institute of Foreign Languages (present Azerbaijan University of Languages)

From 1958 he worked at the Azerbaijan Scientific Research Institute of Hematology and Blood Transfusion, studied the blood clotting system. In 1963–66 he worked as a scientific secretary at the Azerbaijan State Medical Institute, defended his PhD and doctoral dissertations for ten years, and obtained the academic title of professor. (1967–68)

In 1967 he published a monograph: "Several issues of blood clotting in the norm and pathology.",

With this monograph, the prominent hematologist laid the foundation of the scientific theory of blood clotting. This monograph attracted the attention of hematologists of the former USSR. The invention contained in this monograph was approved in 25 April 1967 issue of the Medichinskaya Gazeta, published in the USSR. Innovative scientist Musa Abdullayev, who attracted the attention of hematologists abroad, was invited to the 12th International Conference of Hematologists held in 1969 in the Federal Republic of Germany but was not admitted to the international conference by the former USSR government. Despite his acquittal in 1956 for his political activities in "Lightning"(İldırım), the prominent scientist was invited to international scientific conferences held by foreign countries, but the Soviet regime blocked him each time. Although these people, including Musa Abdullayev, were acquitted, the Soviet government was still afraid of their political views. In 1967, an invitation from Austria was also banned. In fact, the young scientist at the time boldly said, without hiding the reason:

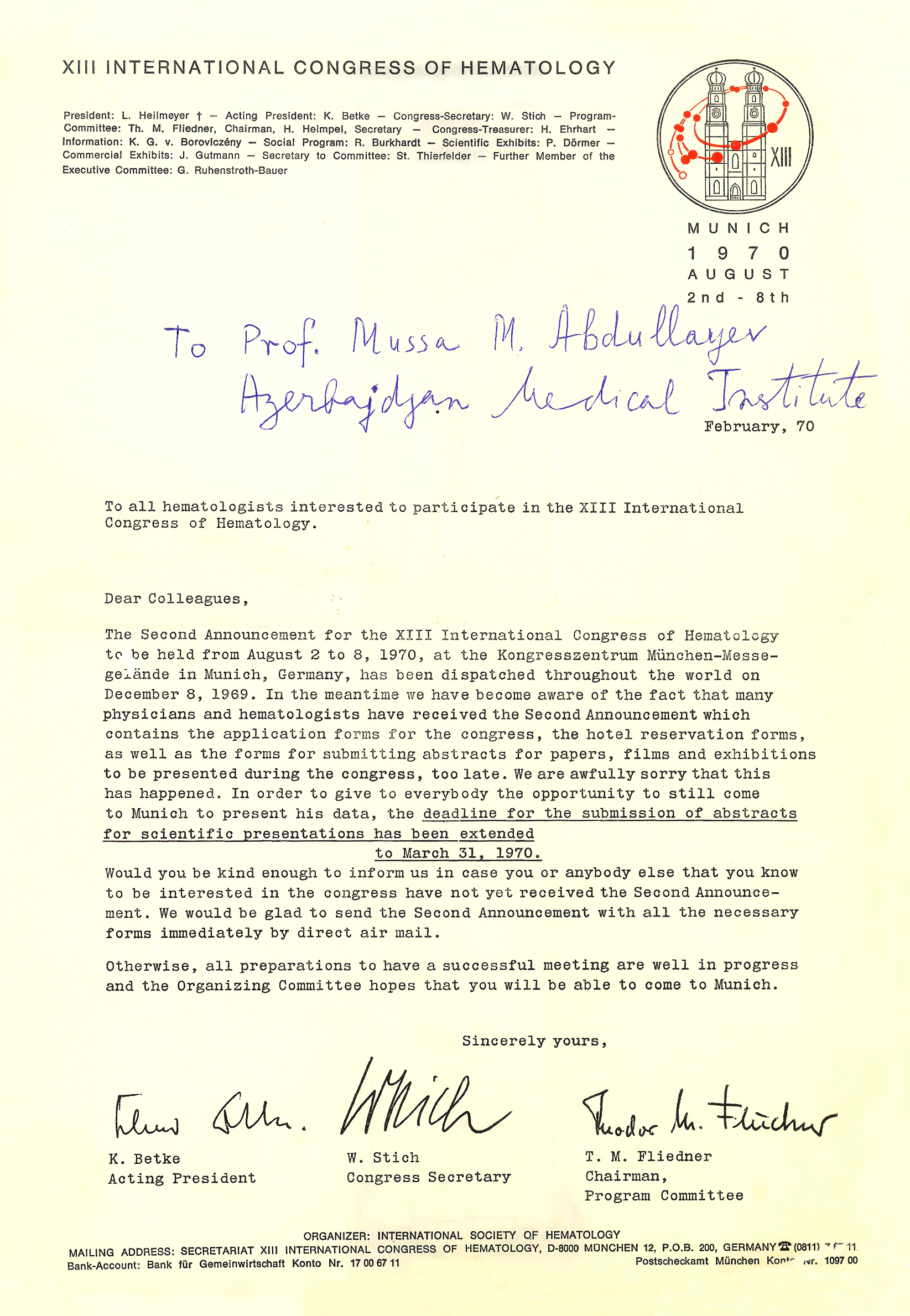
Invitation from the Federal Republic of Germany

"I am well known in foreign countries, but unfortunately, political circles do not want to let me there."

In the article "Study of the hemostatic properties of Ekmolin", published in 1964, the researcher-scientist introduced the use of a new drug in medical science to prevent thromboembolic complications to the wider medical community. Until then, heparin was used in the medical world to prevent thromboembolic complications. In some cases, procaine sulfate was used to remove heparin from the body. Namely, Professor Musa Abdullayev was the first to use ekmolin instead of procaine sulfate. Until then, ekmolin was used by professors Yermolov and Valentinskaya in the treatment of viral influenza. Musa Abdullayev, on the other hand, discovered a new feature of ekmolin to reduce the effects of heparin. According to this discovery, the scientist conducted 32 experiments on 10 dogs. Ekmolin has been shown to act as a procaine sulfate. It is interesting that in 1969, Mustafa Topchubashov, a full member of the USSR Academy of Medical Sciences, world-famous scientist, and politician, mentioned the name of his student in the article "Outstanding Surgeon" dedicated to the 60th anniversary of Fuad Efendiyev in the "Communist" newspaper. Musa Abdullayev worked at the Republican Institute of Hematology and Blood Transfusion since 1958; in 1970–79 he was the head of the second department of propaedeutics of internal diseases of the Azerbaijan State Medical Institute. Prominent hematologist Musa Abdullayev, while leading the second department of propaedeutics of internal diseases of the Medical Institute, implemented the method of cardiac defibrillation in 1974–75, an innovation in the history of medical science in Azerbaijan. Professor Musa Abdullayev wrote the first two-volume English-Azerbaijani medical dictionary in 1979.

The incurable blows inflicted on the human destiny by the Stalin regime, the years of exile, from time to time endangered the health of every member of the "Lightning", including Musa Abdullayev. Musa Abdullayev laid the foundation of hundreds of scientific theories and textbooks with his articles. The fact that the cold, cruel death did not allow the self-sacrifice of science deprived Musa Abdullayev of many scientific inventions and fundamental works.

Prominent scientist Musa Abdullayev died on 8 August 1979, at the age of 51 in Baku. He was married. He has 4 children and grandchildren. He spoke English, Russian, Persian, and Arabic.

== Scientific activity ==
In addition to the publication of scientific papers having great importance for medicine and met with interest by the medical community in the magazine "Problems of Hematology and Blood Transfusion". Musa Abdullayev wrote fundamental works on the problems of cardiology and allergology as well. For the first time in the USSR, in 1979, he compiled an "English-Azerbaijani medical dictionary". His books "Notes on Military Field Therapy" and "Methods of Teaching the Internal Medicine Propaedeutics", as well as "Clinical Interpretation of Laboratory Tests", "Bronchial Asthma is an Allergic Disease", "Some Diseases of the Blood System" are still valuable for medical students. The prominent scientist studied the epidemiology of hemophilia, electron microscopy of platelets, the role of calcium in the process of blood clotting, donation issues, etc. conducted scientific research on other topics presenting great scientific importance. His scientific paper presented to the attention of the general medical community at the International Congress against Cancer held in 1962, concerning the problems of blood clotting process caused detailed discussion and was accepted as a product of a deep research in this field.

Proceedings of the VII Congress of the International Society of Hematologists, held in Rome, Italy on 18 September 1958, were translated from English into Russian by Musa Abdullayev. The editor of the translation was a corresponding member of the Azerbaijan National Academy of Sciences, doctor of medical sciences, professor Fuad Afendiyev. 3 articles of M.Abdullayev was included in the materials of the first conference held in 1960 between the Transcaucasian Institutes of Hematologists and Blood Transfusion. The first article called "The coagulation system in the blood of patients with various splenomegaly and the state of its fibrogenic activity"was prepared in collaboration with Professors F. Afendiyev and A. Akhundov. This article was devoted to the study of a very important topic for that period. The research work "Changes in the blood clotting system during surgery" has not lost its relevance today in terms of important innovations for medical science. Musa Abdullayev's scientific articles were regularly published in the journal "Hematology and blood transfusion" published in the USSR. One of his articles, entitled "Changes in the blood clotting system during blood donation in donors" attracted attention at the level of the former Soviet Union. Musa Abdullayev's article "Modified dried-sterile thrombin at the Azerbaijan Institute of Blood Transfusion and its application in the clinic" co-authored with Professor Huseynov, is also fundamental research work in terms of its style and innovation spirit. For this reason, the results of the scientific inventions of eminent scientists are still used in the medical world today for diseases of the nose, ears, and throat.

In 1962, he defended his thesis on "Fibrinolytic activity of the blood system and changes in coagulation factors in patients before and after surgery" under the supervision of a corresponding member of the Azerbaijan National Academy of Sciences, Honored Scientist Fuad Efendiyev. In 1967, Musa Abdullayev defended his doctoral thesis on "Blood clotting in normal and some pathological conditions."

4 doctoral and 8 PhD theses were defended under the supervision of Professor Musa Abdullayev.

In 1972, he authored a textbook for medical students titled Clinical Interpretation of Laboratory Tests, which has been used in medical education. In the same year, he co-authored the scientific work Military Field Therapy with Abbasov I.T. His publications have contributed to the development of medical science in Azerbaijan, including articles in the Azerbaijan Medical Journal, particularly in the field of hematology. He also contributed to the section on "Blood Diseases" in the manual Clinical Surgery. His academic work and supervision played a role in the training of medical specialists in Azerbaijan.

== Scientific works ==
- "Blood coagulation system in the blood of patients with various spelnomegaly and the state of its fibrinolytic activity." The first -republican conference of Transcaucasian Hematology and Blood Transfusion Institutes. Baku, 1960 .
- "Dry thrombin of the Azerbaijan Scientific-Research Institute of Hematology and Blood Transfusion" First Republican Conference of Transcaucasian Hematology and Blood Transfusion Institutes. Baku, 1960.
- "The state of the coagulation system and fibrinolytic activity of the blood in patients with splenomegaly of various etiology." The first inter-republican conference of the Institute of Hematology of the Transcaucasian republics, 1960 p. 50–51. Abstracts
- "Changes in indicators of the blood coagulation system during surgery". The same source, pp. 60–61.
- "Changes in the factors of the blood coagulation system and its fibrinolytic activity in leukemia." Problems of hematology and blood transfusion, N10, 1961, pp. 19–23.
- Problems of hematology and blood transfusion, 1960.
- Problems of hematology and blood transfusion, 1964.
- Problems of hematology and blood transfusion, 1968.
- "Changes in blood clotting system parameters and fibrinolytic activity during surgical interventions." Azerbaijan Medical Journal, N2, 1961, p26-32
- "Changes in the fibrinolytic activity of blood in surgical patients with various interventions." Collection of scientific papers Azerbaijan Research Institute of Hematology and Blood Transfusion, Baku, 1962. pp. 87–91
- The state of the coagulation system and fibrinolytic activity of the blood in patients with splenomegaly of various etiology. "Surgery", No. 2, 1962. pp. 3–8.
- "Modified dry sterile thrombin of the Azerbaijan Institute of Blood Transfusion and its use in ENT clinic." Azerbaijan medical journal. No. 1, 1962, pp. 17–20
- "The state of fibrinolytic activity of blood in patients with hemophilia." Clinical Medicine, No. 1, 1963, pp. 122–125
- "Change in the hemostatic properties of ekomolin ." Materials of the II annual scientific session dedicated to the 55th anniversary of the birth of Professor F.A. Afendiev 1964, pp. 16–17
- "Splenectomy for Werlhof's disease." Materials of the II Annual Scientific Session dedicated to the 55th anniversary of the birth of Professor F.A. Afendiev, 1964, pp. 146–148
- "The efficiency of spelenectomy in some diseases of the blood system". Problems of hematology and blood transfusion, No. 3,1964 pp. 11–15
- "Blindness in myocardial infarction. Scientific notes, volume XVIII 1965, pp. 119–123
- "The effect of vitamin B12 on the state of the blood coagulation system in patients with hemophilia. " Scientific Notes, Volume XV, 1965, pp. 91–96.
- "The state of the coagulation system and fibrinolytic activity of the blood in patients with congenital microspherocytic hemolytic anemia." Proceedings of the conference on the problems of blood coagulation "1966, pp. 340–342
- Electron microscopic study of the process of blood coagulation in normal conditions and under certain pathological conditions. Scientific Notes, Volume XVIII, 1966, pp. 80–88
- "Influence of spelenectomy on the state of the coagulation system and fibirinolytic activity of the blood in patients with congenital microspherical hemolytic anemia". Problems of hematology and blood transfusion. No. 4, 1968, pp. 18–20.
- "Study of indicators of blood coagulation system in donors, depending on the number of blood donations." Problems of Hematology and Blood Transfusion, N9, 1969, pp. 46–49.
- "Haemophlia in Azerbaijan" XII international Congress on Blood Transfusion, Moscow, 1969
- "Activity of blood carbonic anhydrase in hypertension. Scientific conference of the Preventive Medicine Faculty of the Medical Institute, 1970, pp. 5–6
- "Influence of reserpine on the prothrombin index in patients with essential hypertension." The same conference. 1970, pp. 199–200.
- "Features of the clinic of rheumatism in old and senile age." Bulletin of the Academy of Sciences of the Azerbaijan SSR, 1971, pp. 118–122.
- "Changes in the prothrombin index in hypertensive patients before after treatment with reserpine." Azerbaijan Medical Journal, 1971, No. 8, pp. 6–11
- "The value of additional ECG-leads in clinical rehabilitation of patients with transient ischemic heart disease". 2nd All-Union Congress of Cardiologists, 1973, pp. 17–19
- "Influence of meteorological factors on the clinical course of bronchial asthma." Azerbaijan Medical Journal, No. 7, 1973, p. 51–56.
- "The level of serotonin in patients with bronchial asthma in connection with treatment with histaglobulin and corticosteroids." Clinical Medicine, No. 12, 1974, pp. 83–86
- "Importance of specific diagnostic signals in some allergic diseases and hypertension". Azerbaijan Medical Journal. No.9, 1974, pp. 6–10.
- "Infarction-like clinic in acute pancreatitis." I Rep. Scientific conference of cardiologists. 1975, pp. 32–34
- "Some cardiovascular disorders in pathological menopause in men." The same source. P. 35-37
- «Significance of new additional leads for early and differential electrocardiographic diagnostics of focal ischemic heart disease forms » Theoretical and practical problems of medicine, 1975 / 83–84.
- "On the issue of rheumatic lesions of the lungs." Azerbaijan Medical Journal, N6, 1977, p. 30–32

== Filmography ==
1. https://www.youtube.com/watch?v=ZiOGLSsVs1I&ab_channel=SpaceTV
2. Мusa Abdullaev, CBC ТV https://www.youtube.com/watch?v=PUhrO4scrYg
3. Мusa Abdullaev, АТV ТV https://www.youtube.com/watch?v=JkjKYQ74fp8

== Books ==
- "Questions of blood coagulation in norm and pathology" Azerbaijan State Publishing House, Baku, 1967, 200 p.
- "Clinical interpretation of laboratory tests". Printing house of Azerbaijan State Medical Institute, Baku, 1972, 93 p.
- "Military-field therapy" Printing House of Azerbaijan State Medical Institute, Baku, 1972, 155 p.
- "Clinical Surgery", Publishing House "Maarif", Baku, 1974, 410 p.
- "Theoretical and practical problems of medicine" Azerneshr publisher, 1976
- "Notes from military-field therapy". Publishing House of Azerbaijan State Medical Institute, Baku, 1976, 130 p.
- "Bronchial asthma is an allergic disease." Publishing House "Genjlik", Baku, 1976, 16 p.
- "English-Azerbaijani medical dictionary". Publishing House "Maarif", Baku, 1979, Volume I, 200 p.
- "English-Azerbaijani medical dictionary". Baku, 1983, II volume. 180 s.

== Gallery ==
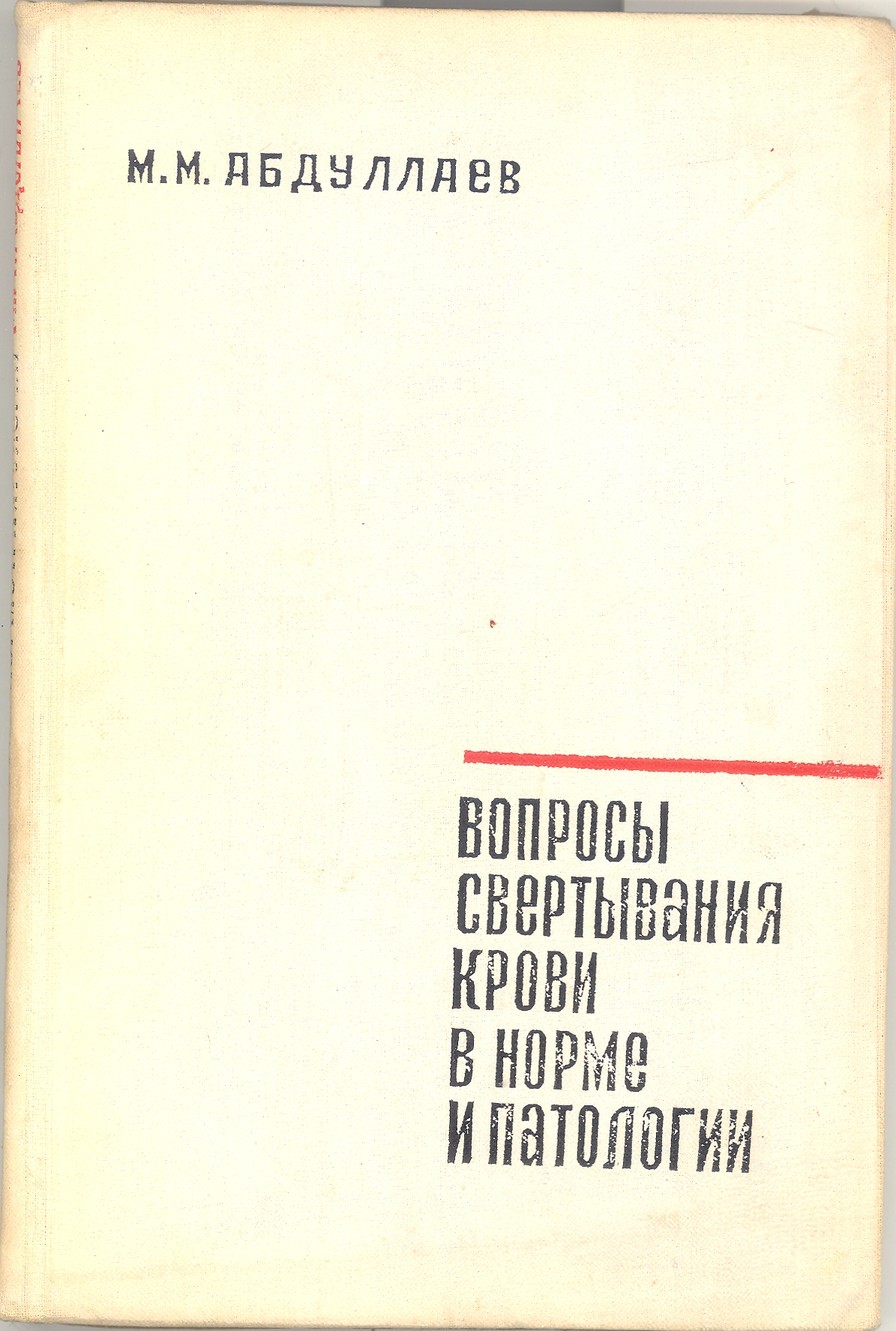

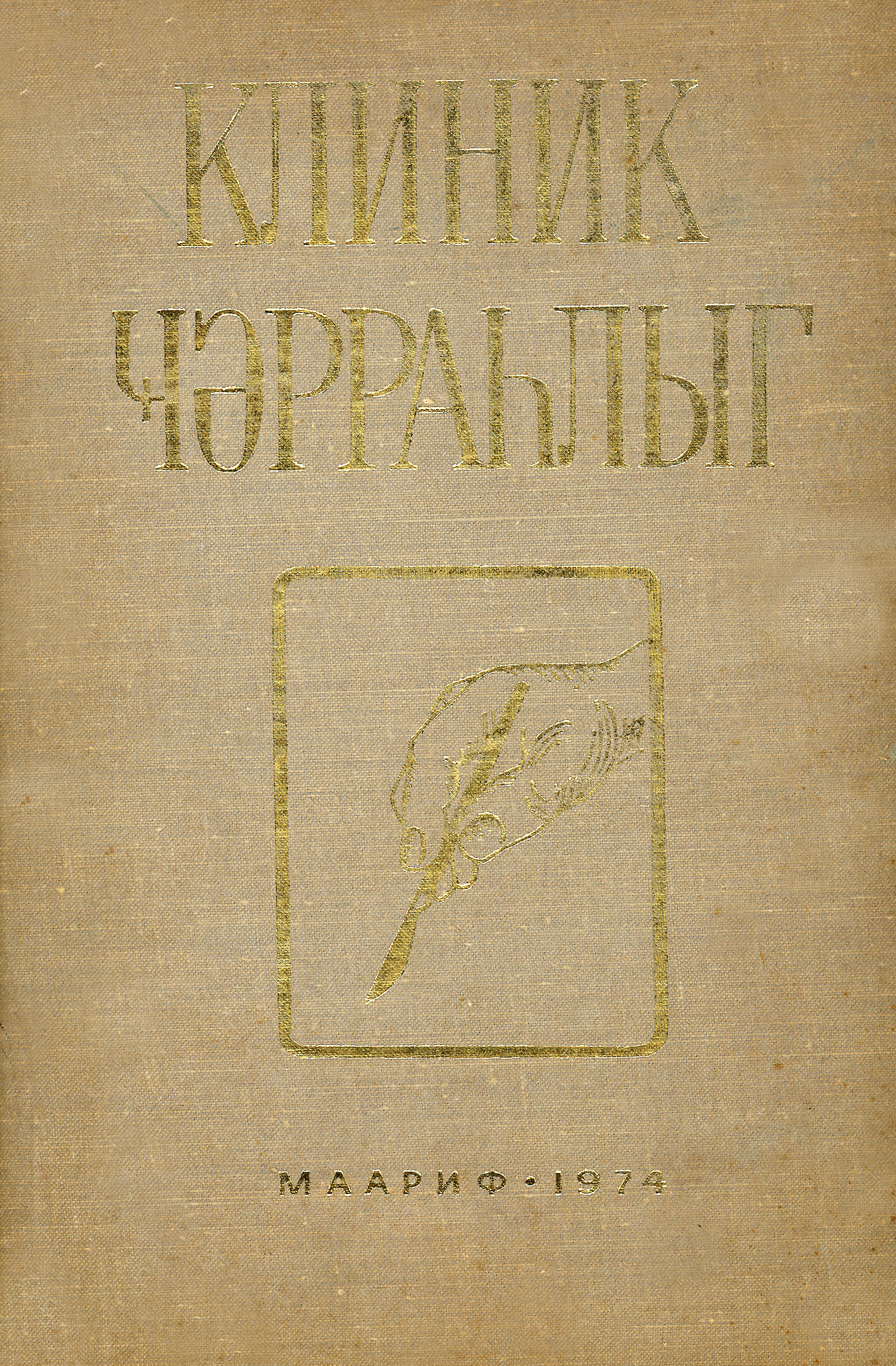

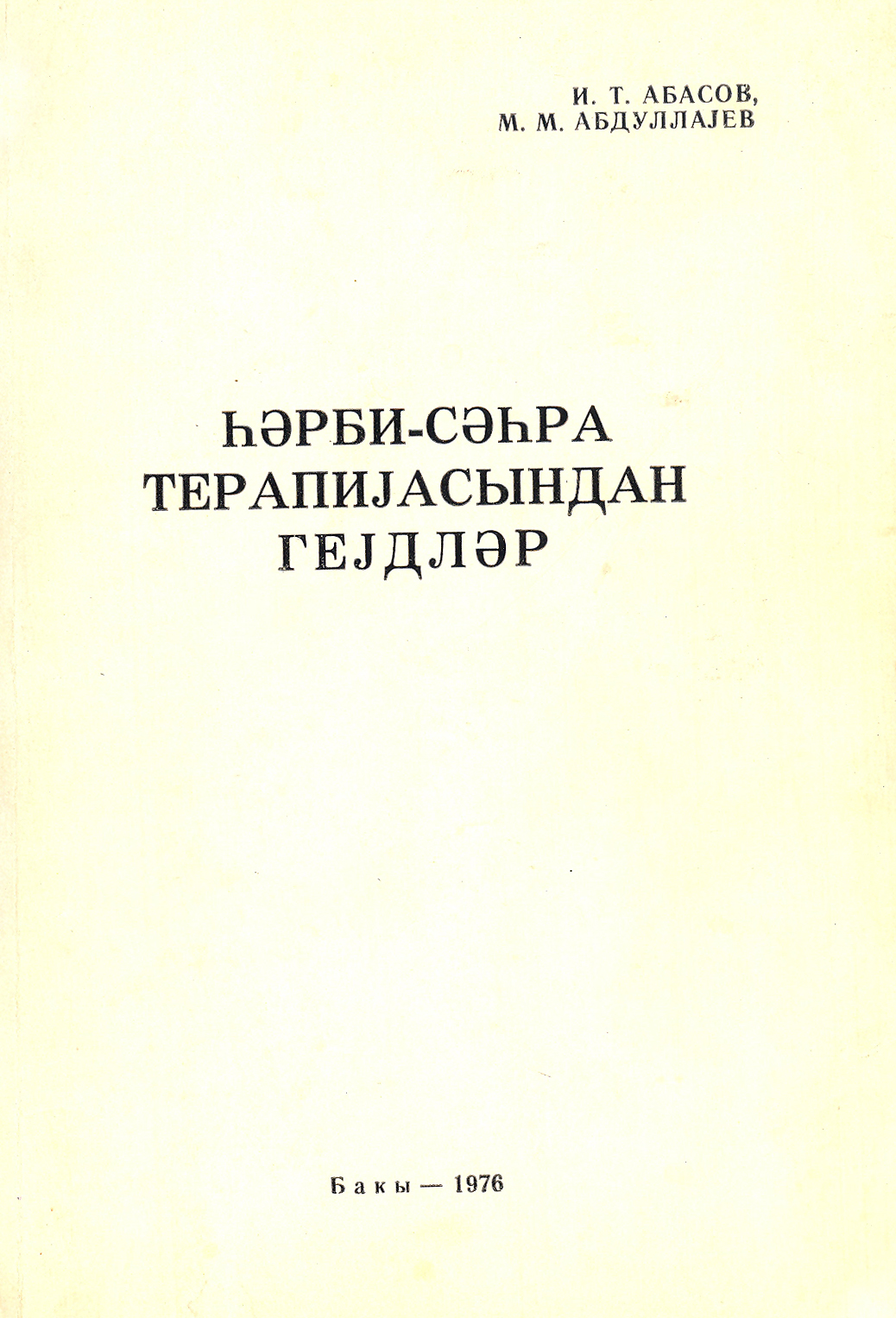

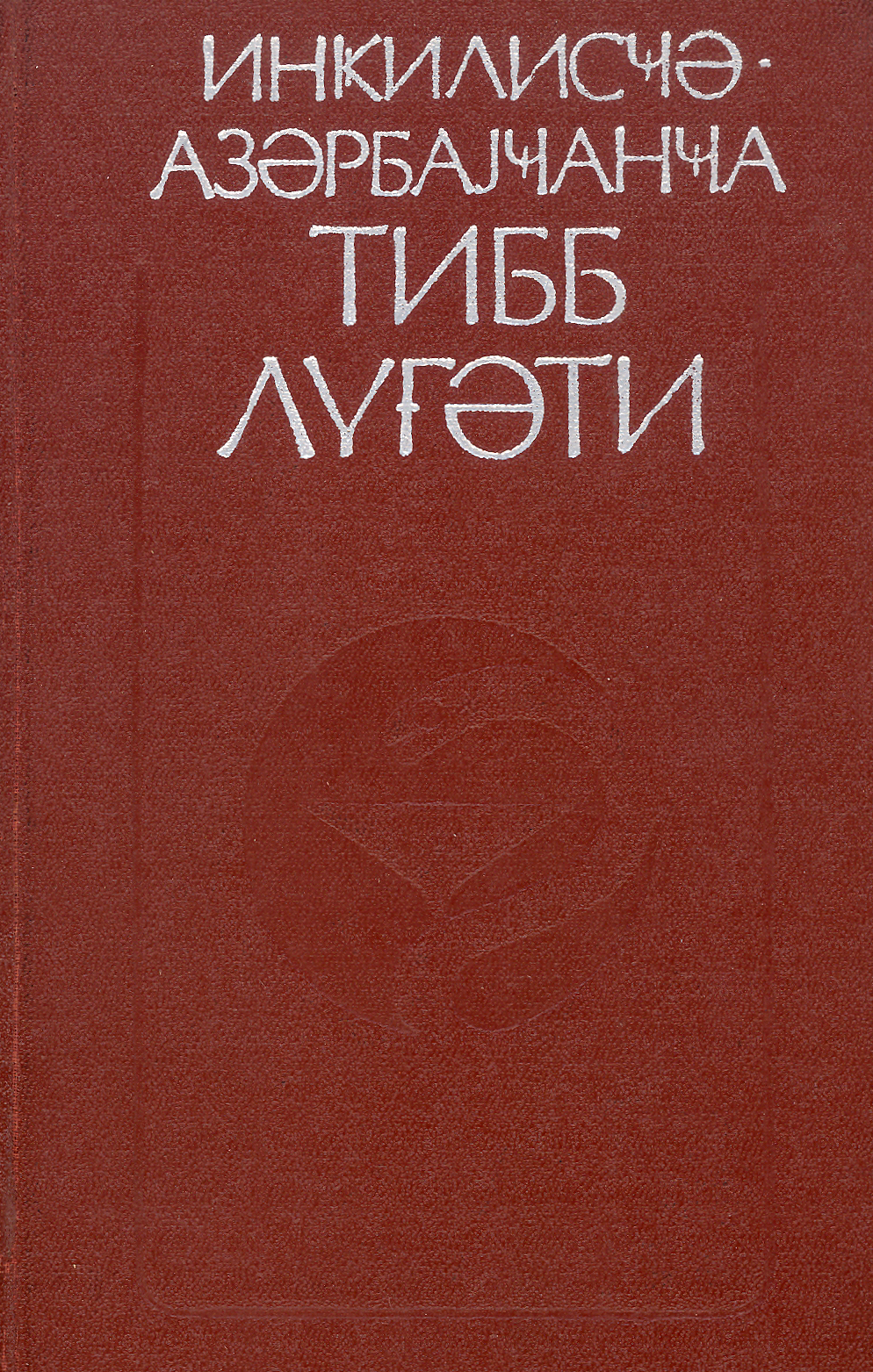

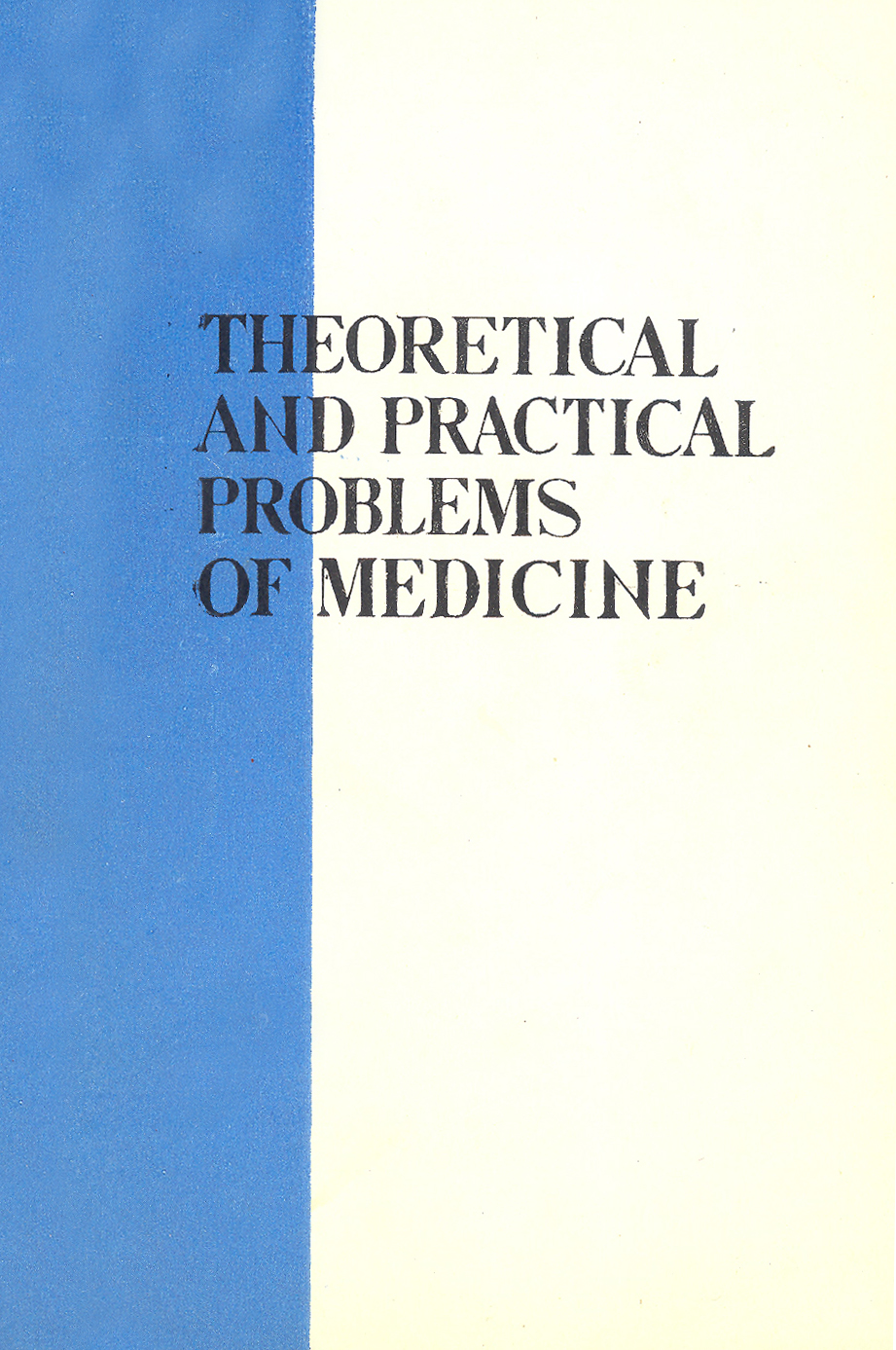

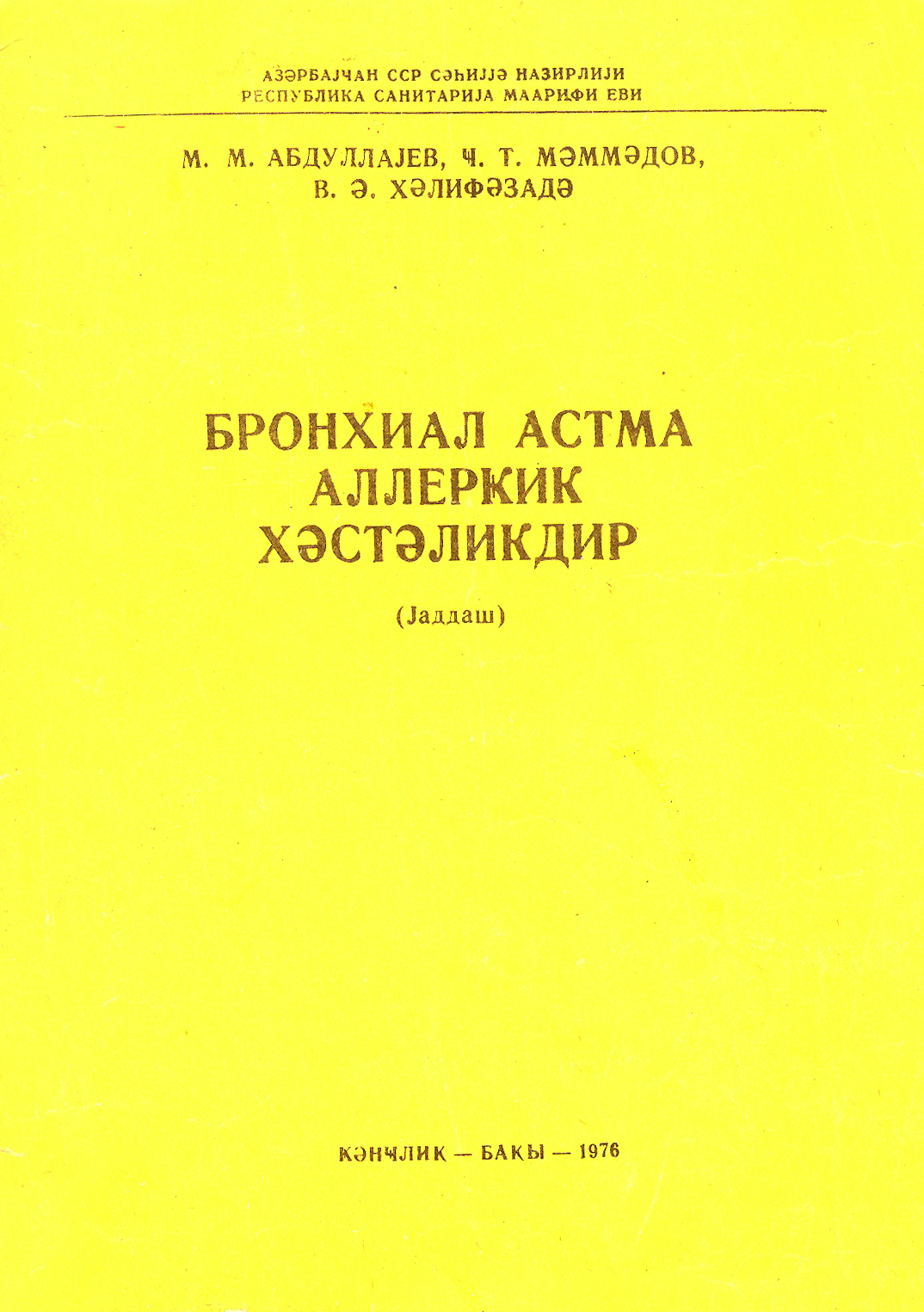

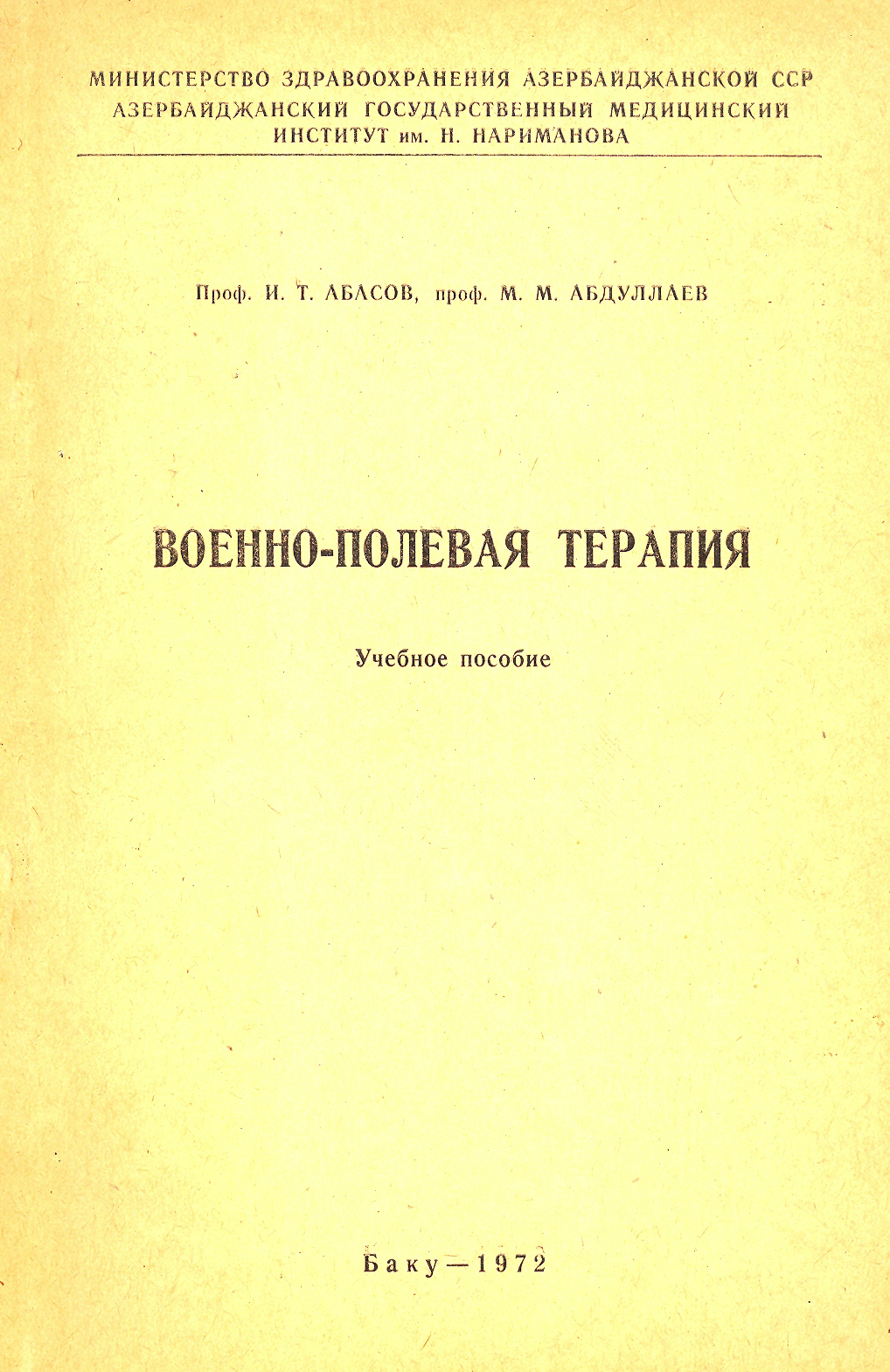

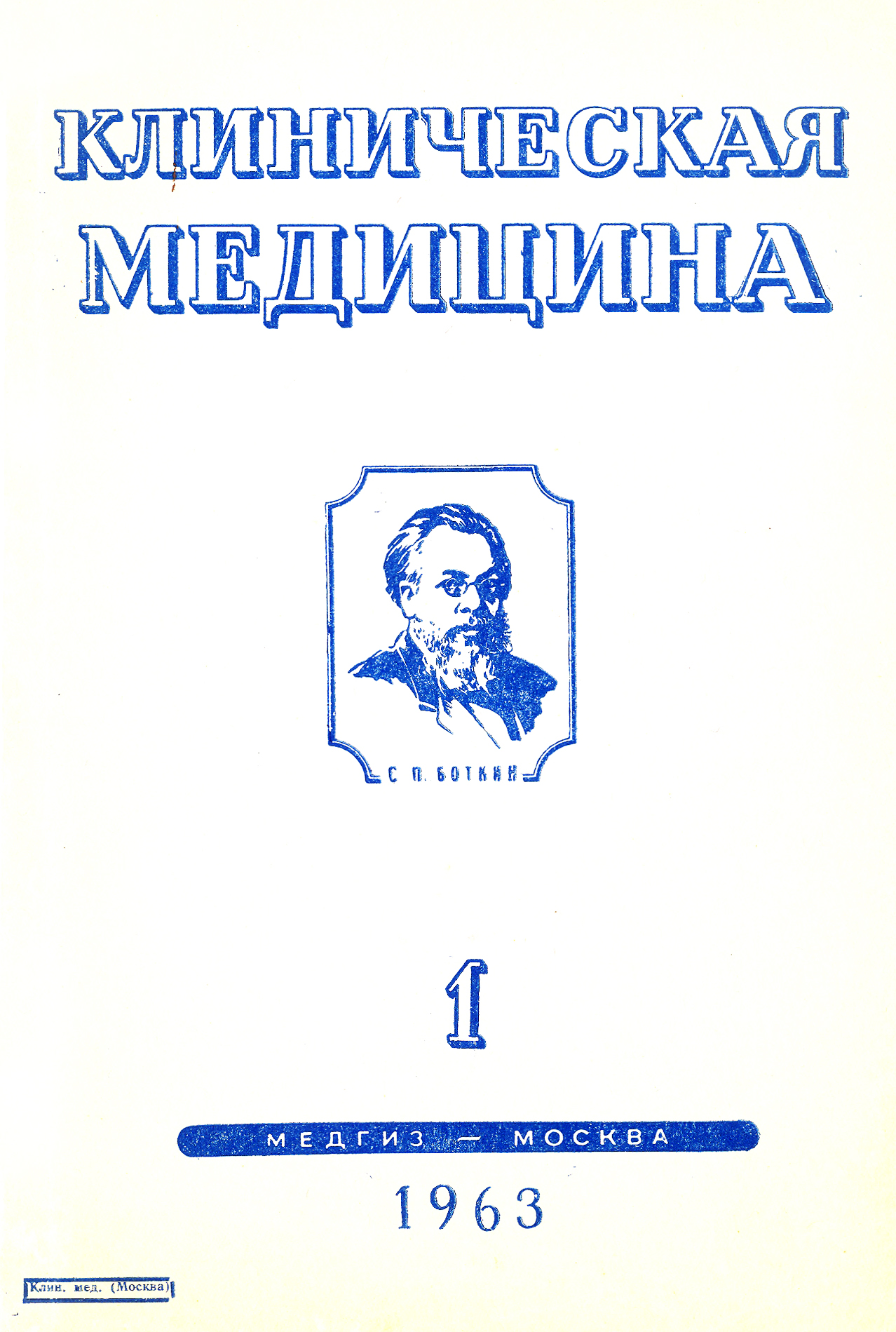

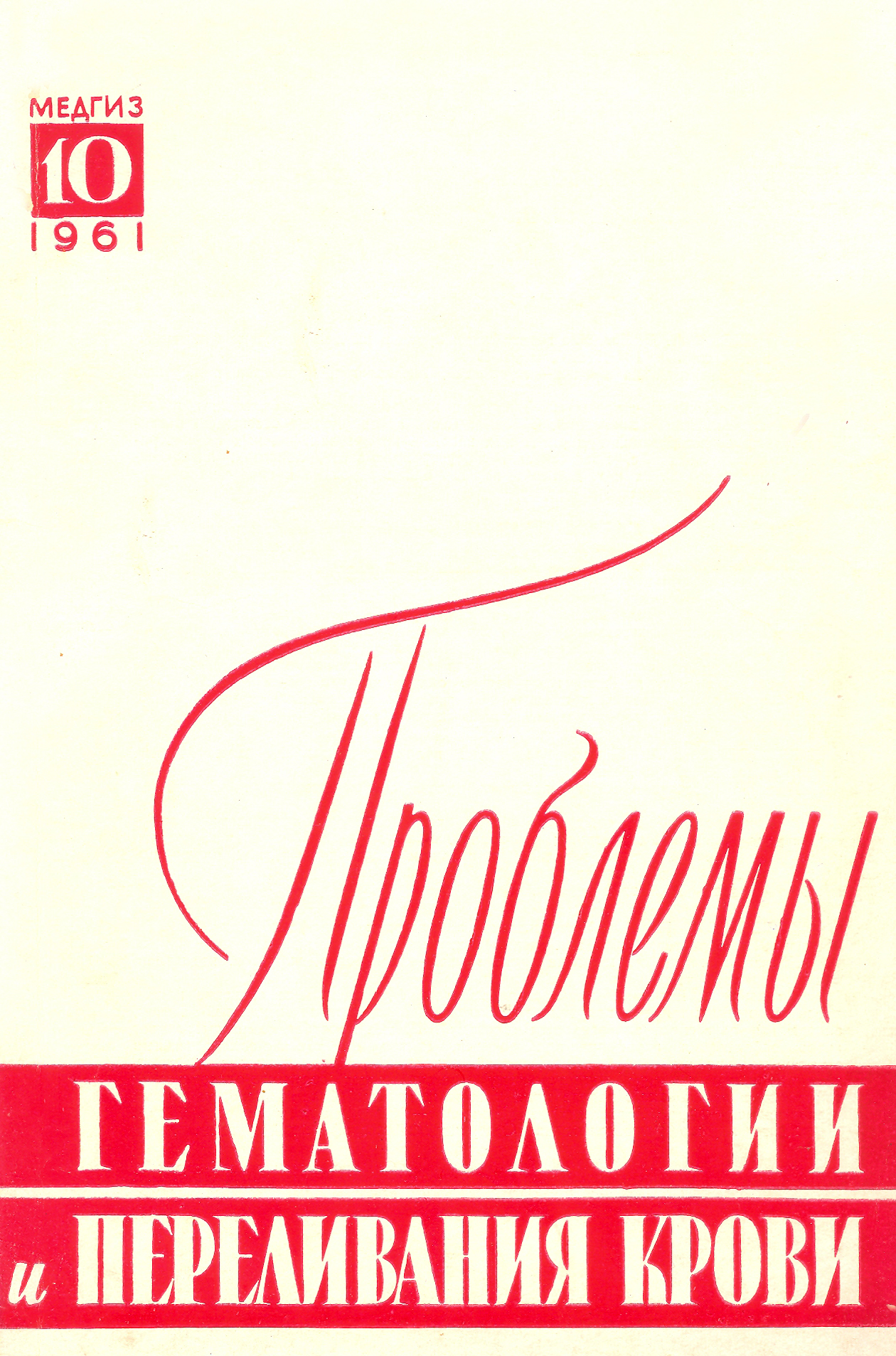

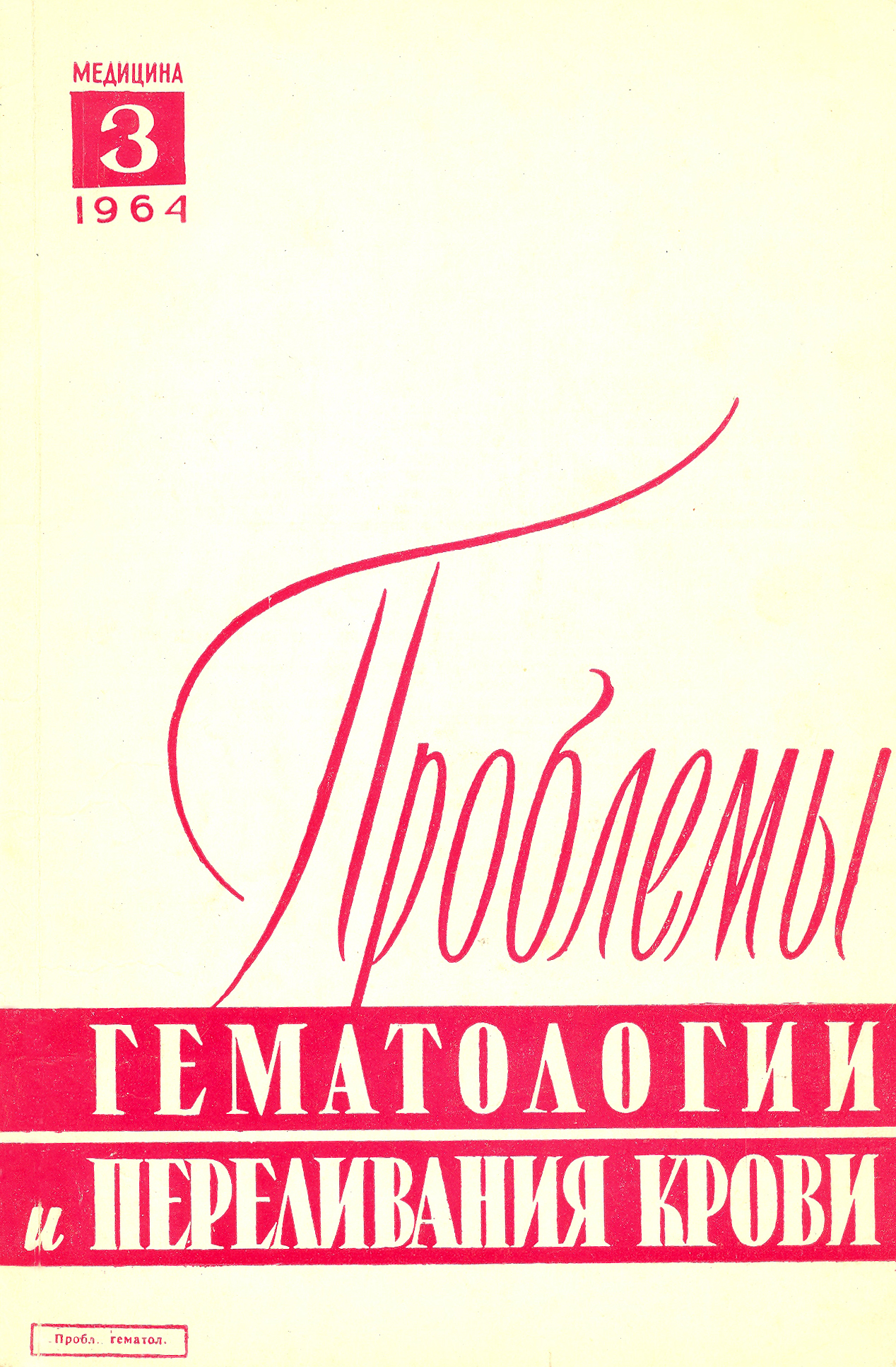

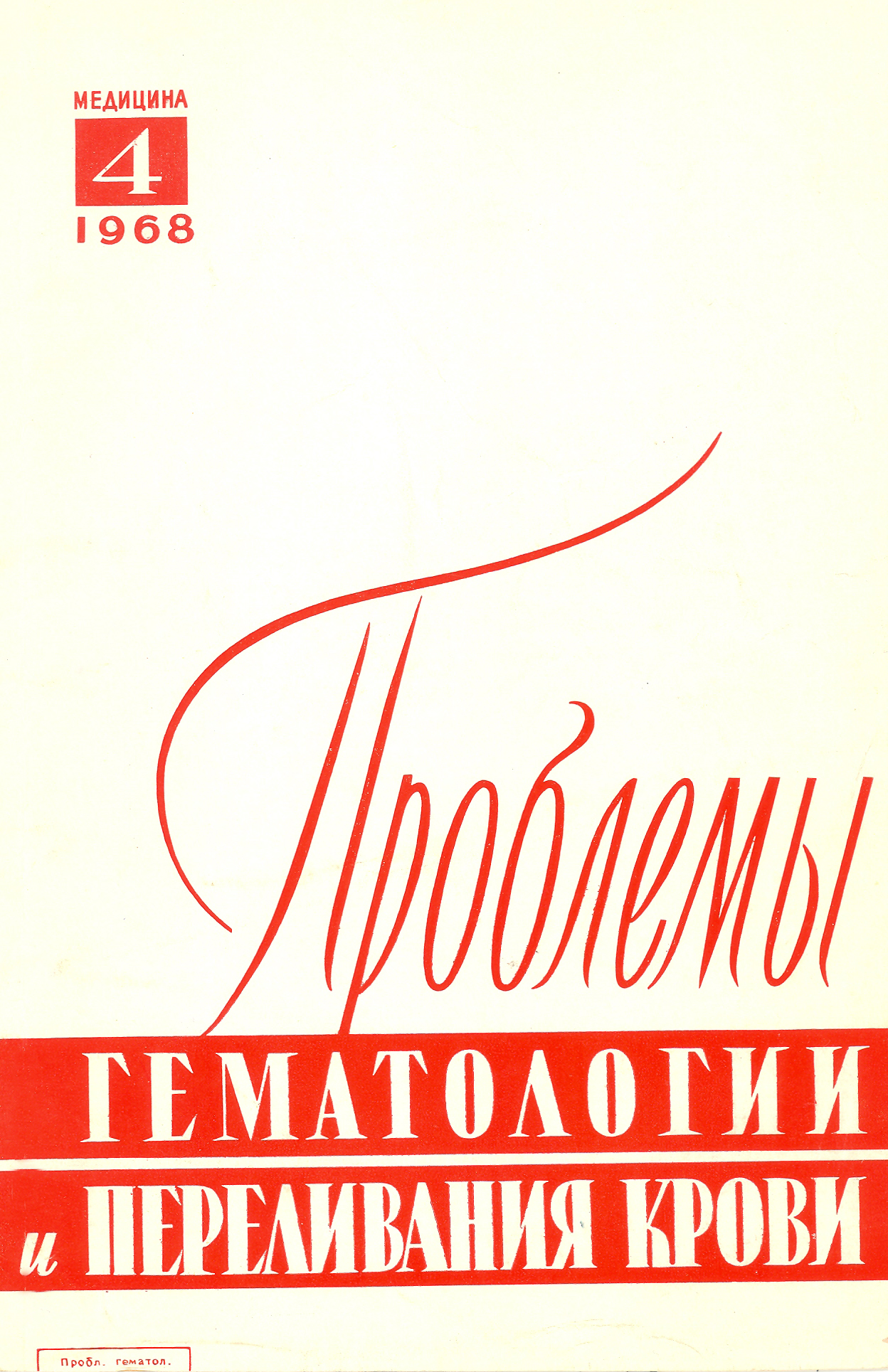

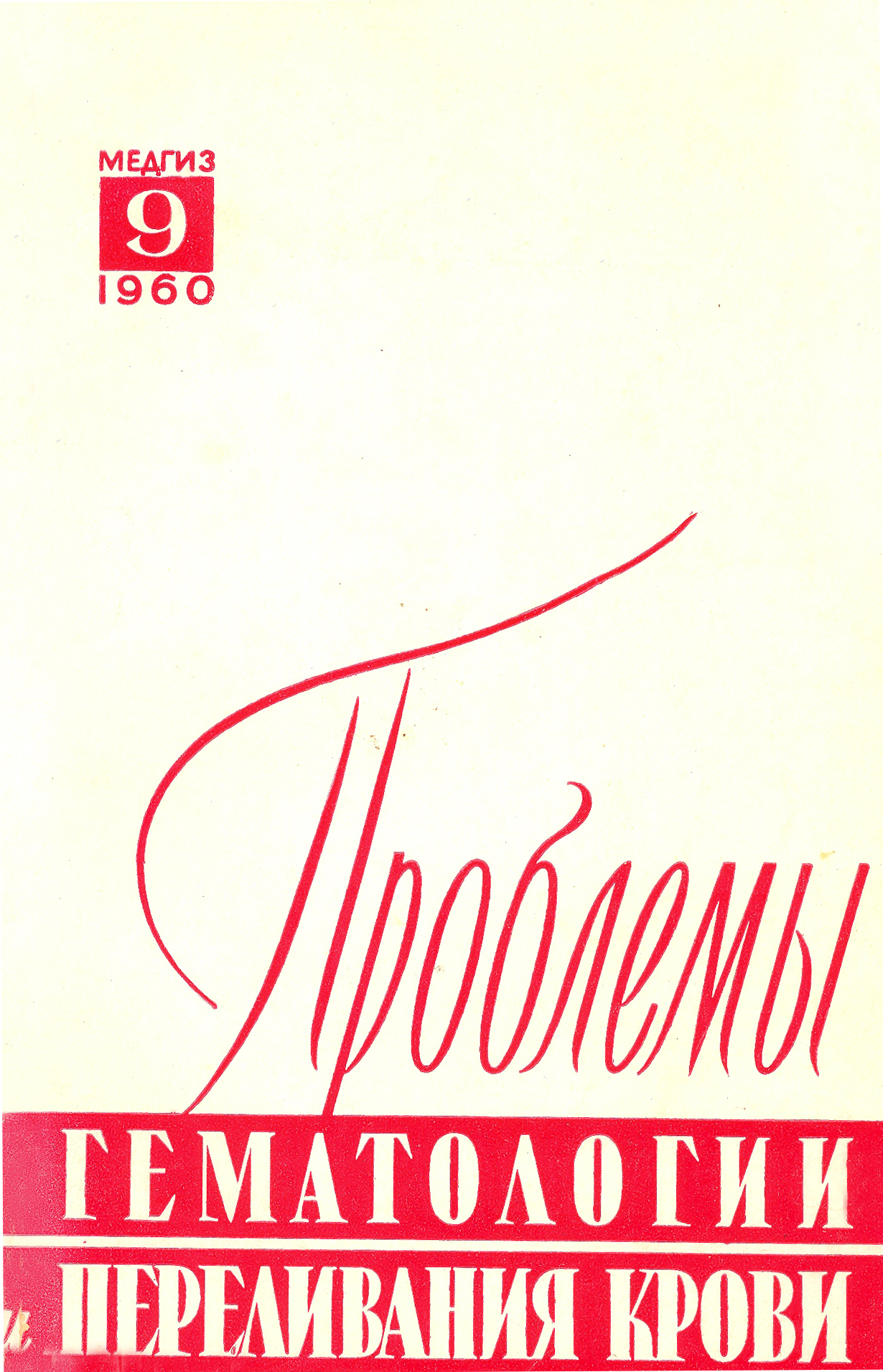

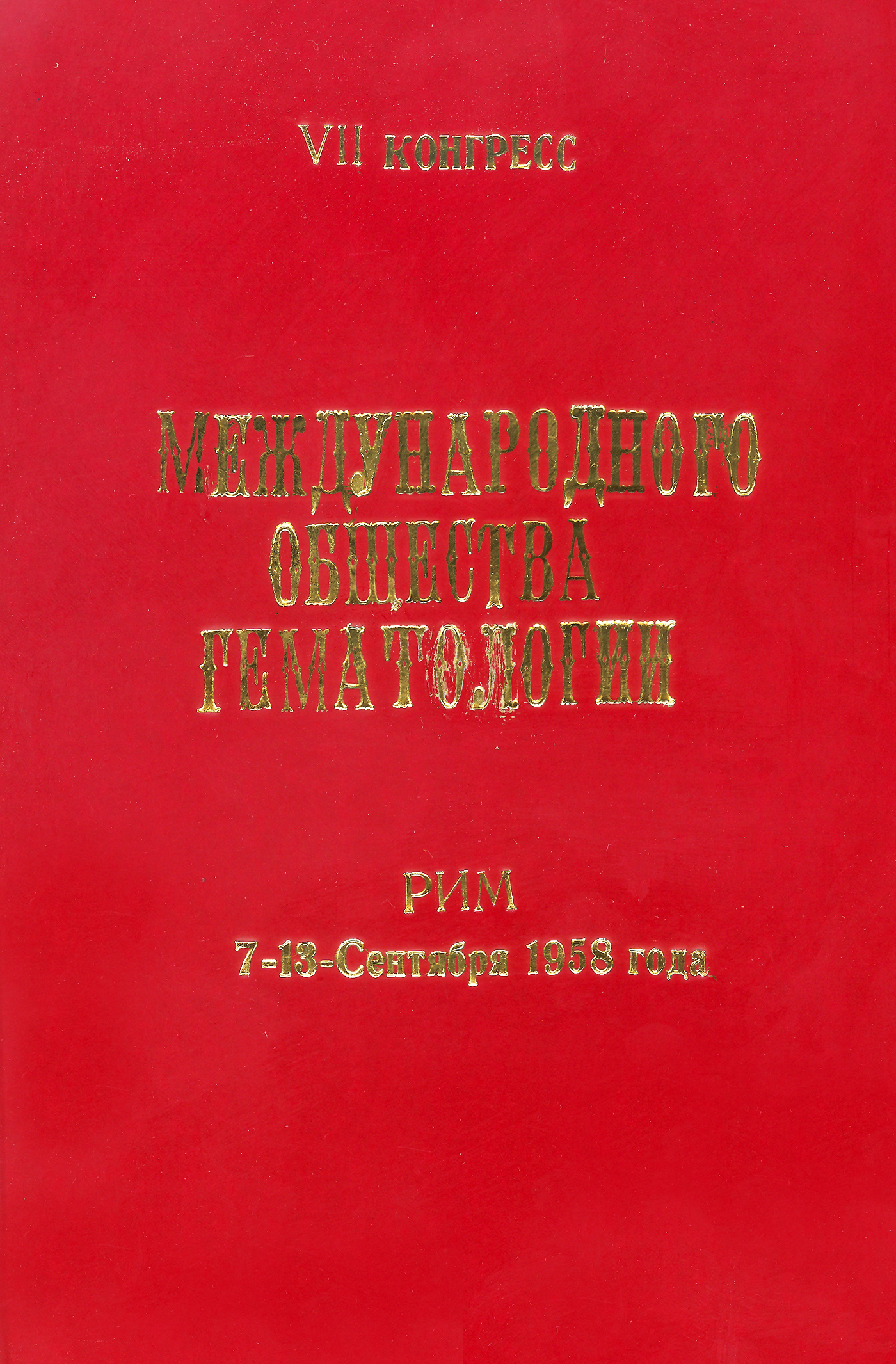

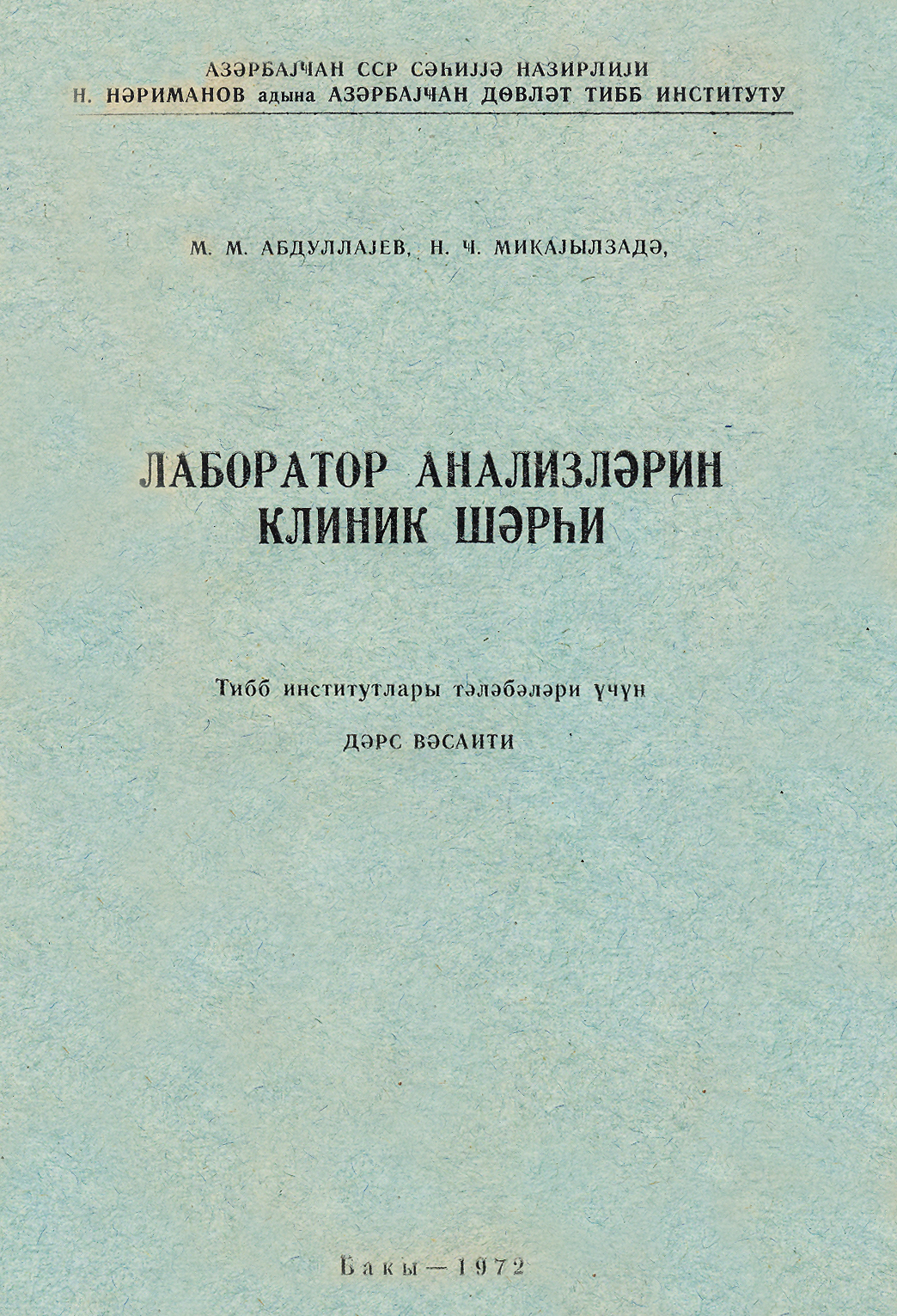
