= Vladimir Tretyakov (serial killer) =

Soviet serial killer

- Влади́мир Никола́евич Третьяко́в
- Born: Vladimir Nikolaevich Tretyakov; 1953; Arkhangelsk, RSFSR
- Died: 19 August 1979 (aged 25–26); RSFSR
- Cause of death: Execution by shooting
- Other names: "The Arkhangelsk Butcher" "The Arkhangelsk Maniac" "Nurseman of Arkhangelsk"
- Conviction: Murder
- Penalty: Death

Details
- Victims: 7
- Span of crimes: 1977–1978
- Country: Soviet Union
- State: Arkhangelsk

Vladimir Nikolaevich Tretyakov (Russian: Влади́мир Никола́евич Третьяко́в; 1953 – 19 August 1979), known as The Arkhangelsk Butcher (Russian: Архангельский мясник), was a Soviet serial killer who killed seven women in his hometown between 1977 and 1978.

== Biography ==
Vladimir Tretyakov was born in 1953. His father left the family before his birth, and Tretyakov grew up with his alcoholic mother, who often beat him. His grandmother managed to get him a general education, leaving him to study in Tashkent. Since then he hated drinking and women. After school, Tretyakov joined the army, then graduated from a vocational school. For several years he lived in Kemerovo Oblast, where he learned to cut up cattle, which proved useful later on. After returning from the army he married, and began work as a railway repairman. Tretyakov also began to argue with his wife because she, according to Tretyakov, drank too much. At some point, his wife, tired from all this, kicked him out of the apartment.

In the mid-1970s, Tretyakov worked as a railroad engineer in Arkhangelsk, was an udarnik, a member of the Voluntary People's Druzhina, and more than once detained hooligans and alcoholics. As an excellent worker, in 1977 he received a separate apartment in one of the new buildings in Arkhangelsk. He also met with Angelina Koroleva, with whom he had a serious relationship. Soon, Tretyakov became annoyed that the woman often consumed alcohol. On these grounds, the pair often quarrelled, eventually leading up to the killer's first murder.

On 9 December 1977, after returning to his apartment and seeing Koroleva in a drunken state, Tretyakov strangled her. Realizing she had died, he used a knife and axe to dismember her corpse, put it in a backpack, and then disposed of the remains in a vacant lot near the train station in Arkhangelsk at night. Tretyakov decided to fight female drunkenness and began to kill women whom he saw on the streets in a drunken state. On 13 December, he murdered a woman named Petrova in her apartment. All of the subsequent murders he committed had the same modus operandi. In addition to the two above, in December 1977 Tretyakov killed and dismembered two more women (Anna Popova and Ekaterina Marchenko). He killed another one, Maria Gerasimova, on 13 January 1978.

Panic ensued in Arkhangelsk. There were rumours that the killer sold meat from the victims on the market, but during the investigation, no such thing could be confirmed. The radio broadcast "Voice of America" reported that cases of cannibalism were noted in the city. On 25 January, Tretyakov killed two girls (Inna Ignakhina and Sveta Eremeeva), who were invited to his home and offered a drink. In his own words,

If they are already at this age and so easily agree to come to a stranger's home and drink with them, then what will come of them next?

=== Arrest, trial and sentence ===
After killing and dismembering the girls, Tretyakov left the bodies lying on the balcony of his apartment. The neighbours soon reported the disappearance of his girlfriend. The head of the criminal investigation department Donat Popov, who conducted the investigation, went alone to him. When he was offered to go to the police station, Tretyakov decided to kill the policeman in the elevator. Popov realised this and lied to Tretyakov that several colleagues had come with him. Tretyakov was taken to the police and questioned about Koroleva's disappearance, explaining that she had drunk and then disappeared. His apartment was searched, and according to those who searched it,

The apartment was small. There was a peculiar smell of blood in it. When the witness came in, Tretyakov's neighbor, he fainted, then he was hospitalized with a heart attack.

During the interrogations, Tretyakov soon confessed to the seven victims and then showed the authorities all the burial places which had not been discovered. Tretyakov's investigative experiments, fearing revenge from the Arkhangelsk residents, were carried under heavy guard with dogs. He was recognized as sane. Psychiatrists diagnosed him with psychopathy. On 11 August 1978, the Arkhangelsk Regional Court sentenced Vladimir Tretyakov to death. The convict tried to appeal the verdict, referring to his hard childhood and useful work as an udarnik. However, the Supreme Court of Russia left the verdict unchanged, stating:

Considering that he killed seven people, we reject the petition for pardon of Vladimir Nikolaevich Tretyakov.

On 19 August 1979, Vladimir Tretyakov was executed by firing squad.

== See also ==
- List of Russian serial killers
