= Sex segregation in Afghanistan =

Sex segregation refers to the physical and spatial separation of humans by sex in public or private places. In public places, women are forced to wear the burqa at all times, because, according to one Taliban spokesman, "the face of a woman is a source of corruption" for men not related to them (Non-Mahram).

== Mughal Empire (1526–1857) ==
ِDuring Babur ruling, Bagh e Zanana (Persian: باغ زنانه) was founded in Kabul by one of royal women called Shahrbanoo (Persian: شهربانو). The garden was reconstructed by Abdur Rahman Khan in 19th century.

== Taliban (1996–2001) ==
During the rule of the first Islamic Emirate of Afghanistan (1996–2001), the Taliban issued edicts which forbade Afghan women from being educated beyond the age of eight, such edicts forced girls and women to leave schools and colleges. The Golden Needle Sewing School was an underground school for women in Herat, Afghanistan, during the first rule of the Taliban. Because women above the age of eight were not allowed to be educated under the strict interpretation of Islamic law which was introduced by the Taliban, women writers who were members of the Herat Literary Circle set up a group which it called the Sewing Circles of Herat, which founded the Golden Needle Sewing School in or around 1996.

== Islamic Republic of Afghanistan (2001–2021) ==
During Islamic Republic of Afghanistan (2004-2021), a huge number of Afghan men didn't have any contact with females other than their own family until going to university. This caused that men not look women as their friends thus usually tended to show impolite behaviours from themselves. So that each day thousands of women suffered from insults in streets all over Afghanistan. During this period, gender segregation in Afghanistan’s schools forced the strained Ministry of Education, which was already short on supplies, funding, and teachers, to recreate the system for each gender.

Baghe-Sharara (Persian: باغ شهرآرا) was a women-only park in Kabul during Islamic Republic of Afghanistan. It is the ancient garden constructed by Babur. No men was allowed to enter because it was a women-only space. This garden was reconstructed by financial supports from US, Italy and Switzerland and yearly on March 8 programs specific to women were held there. As well as, women specific markets were held inside the garden. There were English and sewing classes. The shops selling products, the counselling center, the classes, etc. were all run by women.

== Second Taliban rule (2021–present) ==
Immediately after 2021 Taliban offensive all universities became sex-segregated all over the country. The last time the Taliban was in power, girls and women were forbidden from pursuing an education.

Since March 2022, Taliban started to segregate all amusement parks and resorts by sex. Ministry for the Propagation of Virtue and the Prevention of Vice (Afghanistan) stated that in Kabul males can go to amusement parks on Wednesdays, Thursdays, Fridays and Saturdays while females can go to amusement parks on Sundays, Mondays and Tuesdays. This ministry added no one is allowed to complain emphasizing that men are not allowed to enter parks on women's days.

Following Taliban ruling, since 2023 men are not permitted to dine with family members in family restaurants in Herat province.

== See also ==
- Sex segregation in Iran
- Sex segregation in Saudi Arabia
- 2021 Taliban offensive
- Women-only space
- Golden Needle Sewing School
- Sharia
