= Nadia Anjuman =

Afghan poet

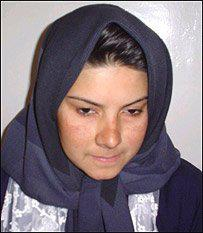
- Born: December 27, 1980; Herat, Afghanistan
- Died: November 4, 2005 (aged 24); Herat, Afghanistan
- Occupation: Writer

Nadia Anjuman (Dari: نادیا انجمن; December 27, 1980 – November 4, 2005) was a poet from Afghanistan.

== Life ==
Nadia Anjuman Herawi was born in Herat in northwestern Afghanistan in 1980; but he was originally from adraskan district.She was one of six children, raised during one of Afghanistan's more recent periods of tumult. In September 1995, the Taliban captured Herat and ousted the then-Governor of the Province, Ismail Khan. With the new Taliban government in power, women had their liberties drastically restrained. A gifted student in her tenth year of schooling, Anjuman now faced a future with no hope for education, as the Taliban shut down girls' schools and forbade private instruction for girls.

In 1996, Anjuman rallied with other local women and began attending an underground educational circle called the Golden Needle Sewing School, organized by the young women and mentored by Herat University Professor Muhammad Naser Rahyab. Members of the Golden Needle Sewing School would gather three times a week under the guise of learning how to sew (a practice approved by the Taliban government), while in actuality the meetings were lectures by Herat University professors with discussions on literature. The project was dangerous; if caught, the likely punishment was imprisonment, torture, and possibly hanging. In order to protect themselves, the attendees had their children play outside the building and act as lookouts. They would alert the women of approaching religious police, at which point the students would hide their books and take up needlework. The program continued through the entirety of the Taliban's rule during this period.

Professor Rahyab became a mentor to Anjuman in writing and literature. In a time when women were not permitted to leave their homes by themselves, Rahyab tutored the sixteen-year-old Anjuman and helped her to develop a distinctive writing voice. He also introduced her to many writers that would greatly influence her work including Hafiz Shirazi, Bidel Dehlavi, Forough Farrokhzad, and others.

Anjuman was 21 when the Taliban regime was ousted in 2001. Now free to pursue a formal education, she was accepted to Herat University to study literature and graduated in 2002. While earning her degree in literature, Anjuman published a book of poetry entitled “Gul-e-dodi” (“Flower of Smoke”) which proved popular in Afghanistan, Pakistan and Iran.

Anjuman married Farid Ahmad Majid Neia, a graduate of Herat University with a degree in literature who became the head of the library there. Neia and his family believed that because she was a woman, Anjuman's writing was a disgrace to their reputation; despite this, Anjuman continued to write poetry. The couple had one son together shortly before Anjuman's murder when she was 25-years-old.

== Work ==
Anjuman published her first volume of poetry in 2005, titled Gule Dudi, or "Flower of Smoke." She was set to publish a second volume of poetry in 2006 entitled Yek sàbad délhore (“An Abundance of Worry”) which included poems expressing her isolation and sadness in her marriage.

== Death ==
On November 4, 2005, Anjuman and her husband had an altercation. According to Neia, Anjuman wanted to go out and visit family and friends, a common practice during Eid al-Fitr (the final day of the holy month of Ramadan). Neia said he would not allow her to visit her sister. Anjuman protested, and they began to fight. That night, Neia beat Anjuman until she was unconscious, severely bruised, and her head cut. Hours later, with Anjuman apparently still unconscious, Neia took her to a hospital by rickshaw; the driver later told authorities that Anjuman was already dead when Neia placed her body in his carriage. Soon afterward, a senior police officer, Nisar Ahmad Paikar, stated that her husband had confessed to battering her following a row, but not to killing her; instead, Neia alleged that Anjuman took poison and confessed to doing so before she died.

Anjuman is said to have vomited blood after having lost consciousness, which doctors later believed was the most likely cause of death. Neia claimed that Anjuman had taken poison after their row and had asked him to tell family and friends that she had died of a heart attack. Neia and his family barred doctors from carrying out an autopsy, so no definitive evidence of the actual cause of death was found. Neia and his mother were both arrested for the possible murder of Anjuman.

The United Nations condemned the killing soon afterwards. Their spokesperson, Adrian Edwards, said that "[t]he death of Nadia Anjuman, as reported, is indeed tragic and a great loss to Afghanistan....It needs to be investigated and anyone found responsible needs to be dealt with in a proper court of law."

Neia was convicted of having murdered Anjuman, for which he then was incarcerated. Tribal elders in Herat began to press Anjuman's ailing father to forgive Neia for her death, in order to shorten Neia's prison sentence. With the promise that Neia would remain in prison for five years, Anjuman's father relented, Anjuman's death was officially deemed a suicide by the Afghan courts, and Neia was released just one month later. Anjuman's father died shortly thereafter from the shock, according to Anjuman's brother.

Anjuman was survived by her six-month-old son, who is now in Neia's custody.

Both Gole Doudi and Yek Sabad Delhoreh were first published in Afghanistan. Gole Doudi has been reprinted in Afghanistan three times and has sold over 3,000 copies.

== Poetry in translation ==
Diana Arterian and Marina Omar co-translated a selection of Nadia Anjuman's poetry into English, entitled Smoke Drifts, which was published by World Poetry Books in 2025. Aria Aber wrote an introduction, and Arterian edited the collection. Excerpts have been published widely, including in the Hair on Fire: Afghan Women Poets anthology published by Two Lines Press.

Flor de Fumo, a Portuguese translation by Regina Guimarães based on Arterian and Omar's co-translations, was published by Exclamação in 2023.

A selection of Anjuman's poetry in English translation appears in the book, Load Poems Like Guns: Women's Poetry from Herat, Afghanistan (Holy Cow! Press, 2015), edited and translated by Farzana Marie. The book includes both Farsi and English versions of the poetry of eight female Afghan poets, including work by Anjuman. The introduction also tells the story of Anjuman's life and death in detail, based on interviews with the poet's family, friends, classmates, and professors and research on the ground in Herat.

Cristina Contilli, Ines Scarpolo, and M. Badihian Amir translated Anjuman's work into Italian in a volume entitled Elegia per Nadia Anjuman, published in 2006.

== Additional sources ==
- A Nation Challenged: Afghan Poets Revive a Literary Tradition (The New York Times report, December 16, 2001)
- Afghan woman poet Nadia Anjuman remembered two years on (AFP (via The Embassy of Afghanistan in Tokyo, Japan), November 6, 2007)
- R M Chopra, "Eminent Poetesses of Persian", Iran Society, Kolkata, 2010
