= Diana Arterian =

American poet

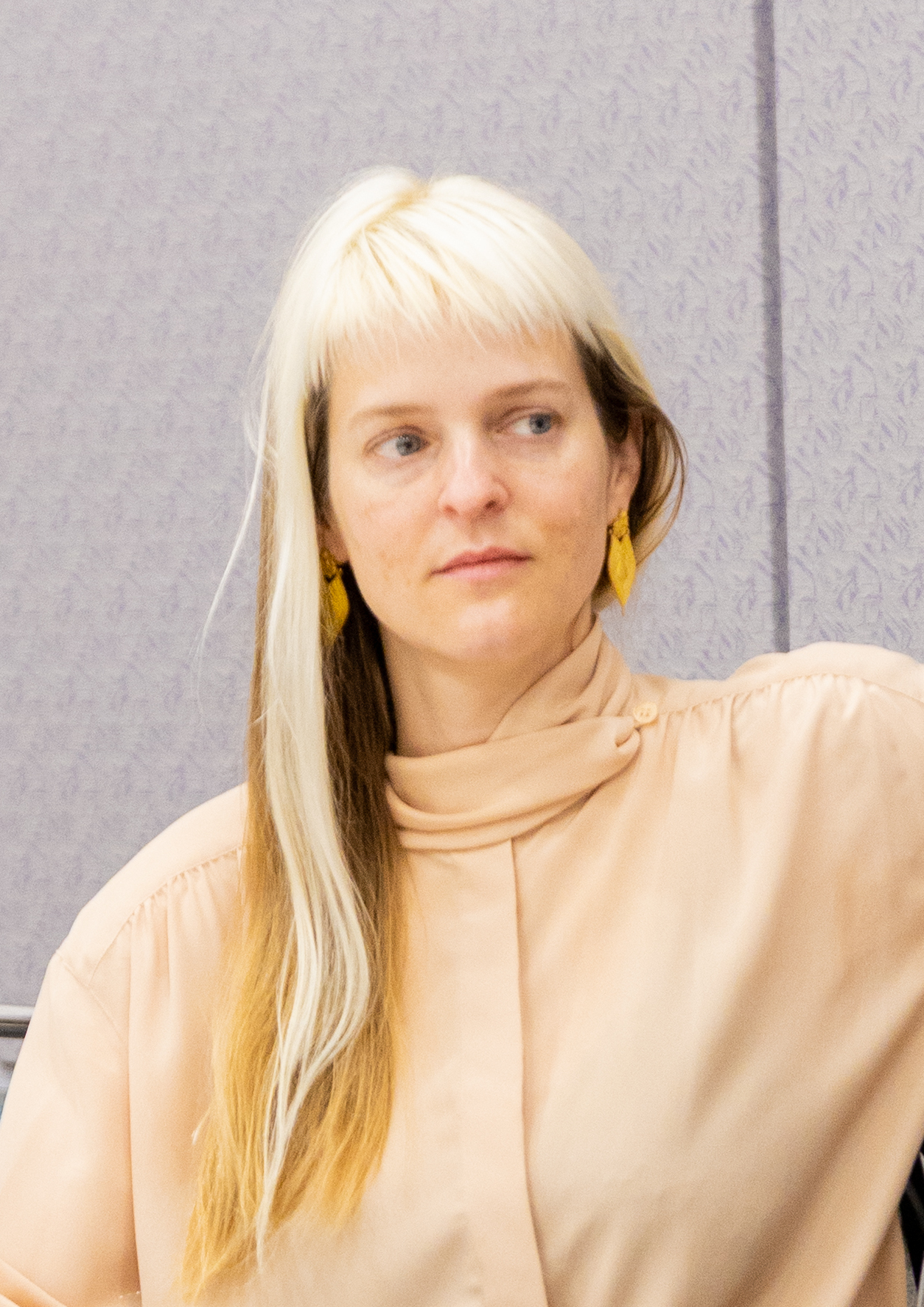
- Arterian at the Association of Writers & Writing Programs 2025
- Born: 1985 (age 40–41) United States
- Occupation: Writer, critic, editor, professor
- Education: California Institute of the Arts (M.F.A.); University of Southern California (Ph.D.)
- Genre: Poetry, essay, criticism

Diana Arterian (born 1985) is an American poet, writer, critic, editor, and translator.

== Life ==
Arterian was born and raised in Arizona. She attended California Institute of the Arts, where she obtained her MFA and was mentored by Maggie Nelson. She earned her PhD in Literature and Creative Writing at the University of Southern California. She lives in Los Angeles.

Arterian has had fellowships and residencies at Banff Centre, Millay Arts, Vermont Studio Center, and Yaddo.

She is a poetry editor for Noemi Press, and curates and writes the "Annotated Nightstand" column at Literary Hub.

== Work ==
=== Agrippina the Younger ===
Arterian's second poetry collection, described as "hybrid," was published by Northwestern University Press' imprint Curbstone in 2025. and received the 2026 William Carlos Williams Award from the Poetry Society of America. Alice Notley prodded Arterian to write the book when they met in 2014. Arterian explains in an interview with David Naimon on Between the Covers, that Notley, upon reading Arterian's initial poems about Agrippina's death, asked "Who is this person? What was in her childhood, essentially, that would provoke her desire for power?" Arterian goes on to state, "I feel like she did this really beautiful thing of gently making me understand that I was doing the same thing that people had been doing for centuries, where they just focused on this dramatic, violent moment in this person’s life." Arterian explains in an interview with Diana Khoi Nguyen in BOMB about the collection about the Ancient Roman noblewoman that "I desperately wanted to see, hear, smell, touch what existed during Agrippina’s lifetime and hold that information in my mind. I learned that such absolute knowledge wasn’t only impossible, it wasn’t all that significant...I had to sit in the discomfort that there are some things we can never know." Arterian has also written about how obsession is a key theme of the collection.

In his judge's citation for the William Carlos Williams Award, Alan Gilbert writes, "Narrating a history of early dynastic Rome in a mix of poetry and prose, Agrippina the Younger makes it clear, without being didactically explicit, how much this violence is still with us and how insane a ruler can be." Agrippina the Younger was listed by Poetry Northwest staff in their "2025 Summer Favorites," where they called it a "The grand and beguiling collection." Emily Van Duyne in the Los Angeles Review of Books writes, "Arterian is a fine storyteller, moving the reader deftly between Agrippina’s real and imagined histories and the poet’s present-day search for her. The book is cleverly paced, arranged so that Arterian’s quests seem to reveal Agrippina’s secrets. Before long, I felt infected with the loving obsession that drove the writing of this book." The book received praise from Robin Coste Lewis and Brandon Som,, and was a finalist for the Big Other Readers' Choice Awards and winner of the Eric Hoffer Medal Provocateur Award.

=== Playing Monster :: Seiche ===
Arterian's first book of poetry, Playing Monster :: Seiche, received a starred review in Publishers Weekly, which states, "Arterian weaves a family narrative of devastating clarity from letters, found text, memories, and more in her striking debut...The post-traumatic stress of a family is a complex subject that Arterian skillfully describes in plain language, achieving deep emotionality." Allie Rowbottom writes in her review, "At once ambitious and restrained, [Playing Monster :: Seiche] demonstrates not only Arterian’s lyrical range and knack for producing work with a certain epic energy, but also her ability to pair delicate content (in this case the trauma of domestic abuse), with a form expressive of its deeper energetic truth. The result is a portrait of anxiety and fear that is both detailed, sweeping and evocative."

The collection moves between two narratives to create a book-length poem describing Arterian's childhood experiences with abusive father in the "Playing Monster" portion, and her mother more recently having a stalker in the "Seiche" portion. In a conversation in the Los Angeles Review of Books, Arterian mentions some uncertainty about publishing a book that is emotionally difficult to read. She explains, "After some years of hand-wringing I decided it felt important to publish predominantly because the stability of the home is often a false facade — the home of the educated, white, middle-class family, in particular." A "seiche" is a standing wave that moves across a body of water, which Arterian mentions embodies the feeling of dread in an abusive situation. In an essay for the Poetry Foundation, she notes, "I recently came upon a piece of knowledge that links these two manuscripts in my mind more tightly than ever before. A seiche can produce a single ripple so large and strange to those who see it from afar it registers as unknown, as danger, as animal—as monster," as seiches at times convince viewers they see the Loch Ness Monster.

=== Criticism ===
Arterian's criticism has appeared widely, including in New York Times Book Review, The Rumpus, Los Angeles Review of Books, Boston Review, and she writes the "Annotated Nightstand" column at Literary Hub.

=== Translation ===
Arterian co-translated of the work of the late Afghan poet Nadia Anjuman with Marina Omar. Arterian edited the subsequent volume, entitled Smoke Drifts, which was published by World Poetry Books in 2025 with an introduction by Aria Aber. "She wrote fiercely,” writes Aber of Anjuman, “with a formal deftness that bears witness to a profound respect for the canon and the ambition to reinvent tradition.” Some of these co-translations were published in a variety of journals including North American Review, and Poet Lore., and were anthologized in Hair on Fire: Afghan Women Poets, published my Two Lines Press.

The composer Reena Esmail set some of Arterian and Omar's co-translations to music, the performances of which have received positive reviews. Flor de Fumo, a Portuguese translation by Regina Guimarães based on Arterian and Omar's co-translations, was published by Exclamação in 2023.

== Bibliography ==
=== Collections ===
- Agrippina the Younger: Poems (Northwestern University Press/Curbstone, 2025). OCLC 1484906188
- Smoke Drifts: Collected Poems, co-translation of Nadia Anjuman edited by Arterian (World Poetry Books, 2025). OCLC 1548127059
- Playing Monster: Seiche (1913 Press, 2017). OCLC 780002302

=== Edited anthologies ===
- TK: Noemi 25th Anniversary Anthology (Noemi Press, 2027).
- Among Margins: Critical & Lyrical Writing on Aesthetics (Ricochet Editions, 2016). OCLC 956693921

=== Chapbooks ===
- Songs of Innorience (Argos Books, 2018). OCLC 1099278340
- With Lightness & Darkness and Other Brief Pieces (Essay Press, 2017).
- Death Centos (Ugly Duckling Presse, 2014). OCLC 858816486
