= Islam and gender segregation =

Gender segregation in Islamic law

Gender segregation in Islamic law, custom, law, and traditions refers to the practices and requirements in Islamic countries and communities for the separation of men and boys from women and girls in social and other settings. In terms of actual practice, the degree of adherence to these rules depends on local laws and cultural norms. In some Muslim-majority countries, men and women who are unrelated may be forbidden to interact closely or participate in the same social spaces. In other Muslim countries, these practices may be partly or completely unobserved. These rules are generally more relaxed in the media and business settings and more strictly observed in religious or formal settings.

== Views ==
There have been fatwas that forbid free mixing between men and women (known as Ikhtilat) when alone. The objective of the restrictions is to keep such interaction at a modest level. According to some, men are not permitted to touch any part of the body of the women, whether she is Muslim or non-Muslim. Others have ruled that Muslim men and women who are not immediate relatives may not, for instance, socialize in order to know each other with a handshake or any form of contact that involves physical contact.

A number of Muslim intellectuals and Muslim scholars have challenged this view and claim that certain physical contact is permissible as long as there is no obscenity, inappropriate touching (other than a simple handshake), secret meetings or flirting, according to the general rules of interaction between the genders.

In some parts of the Muslim world, preventing women from being seen by men is closely linked to the concept of Namus. Namus is an ethical category, a virtue, in Middle Eastern Muslim patriarchal character. It is a strongly gender-specific category of relations within a family described in terms of honor, attention, respect/respectability, and modesty. The term is often translated as "honor".

In some Turkish Sufi interpretations of Islam, including Alevism, gender segregation does not exist in any aspects including religious rituals and clergy. For example; Cemalnur Sargut, a woman who does not veil, currently leads the Turkish branch of the Rifaʽi order. The Bektashi order allows women to fill in religious roles or become dervishes as well. The incumbent head of the 'Alevi/Bektashi Culture Presidency' under the Ministry of Culture and Tourism of Turkey is also a woman, Esma Ersin.

== Sources ==
The Qur'anic verses which address the interaction of men and women in the social context include:

Tell the believing men to lower their gaze and to be mindful of their chastity: this will be most conducive to their purity – (and,) verily, Allah is aware of all that they do. And tell the believing women to lower their gaze and to be mindful of their chastity, and not to display their charms beyond what may be apparent thereof; hence let them draw their veils over their bosoms and do not show their adornments except to their husbands or their fathers or their husbands' fathers or their sons or their husbands' sons or their brothers or their brothers' sons or their sisters' sons or their women or what their right hands possess or male servants free of sexual desires or those children who never knows the private things of women; and do not stamp their feet so that it may show their hidden adornments; and repent towards God collectively O believers so that you may succeed.

— Qur'an, Sura 24 (An-Nur), ayat 30–31

However, he forbade men from stopping their wives from going to the Mosque:

The Messenger of God said, "Do not prevent the maid-servants of God from going to the mosque."

— Muslim, No.888 (See also Nos. 884–891 and Bukhari Vol.1, Nos. 824, 832)

== Early Islam ==
=== Umayyad and Abbasid caliphates ===
The roots of gender segregation in Islam have been investigated by many historians. Leila Ahmed said that the harem arose in the Umayyad and Abbasid dynasties and was not an institution from the time of Muhammad. Leor Halevi wrote in an article about women and mourning laments that a "novel and unprecedented concern with the segregation of the sexes" took place in Kufa, Iraq, in the eighth century. In time, this became normative. Everett K. Rowson discovered that gender nonconforming men in eighth century Medina could move freely between the sexes. Known as Mukhannath, these men were freely able to move between men and women due to beliefs that they were not sexually attracted to women. This changed during the times of the Early Caliphs in order to further keep women in private.

Gender segregation did not exist for female slaves. Female slaves were visible in public; while free Muslim women were expected to veil in public to signal their modesty and status as free women, slave women were expected to appear unveiled in public to differentiate them from free and modest women, and the awrah of slave women defined as being only between her navel and her knee, which meant they were not veiled. The famous qiyan-slave artists were not secluded from men in harem, but in contrast performed for male guests.

== Ottoman Empire ==
=== The Imperial Harem ===
The Ottoman Empire kept genders segregated in the harems and concubines were not allowed to leave the harem. Men, aside from the male head of the household, were forbidden to enter the harem. However, eunuchs were allowed to move freely inside and outside the harem and acted as protectors of the women. This position gave eunuchs the ability to have access to the ruler's living quarters. A common consequence of this segregation of the ruler from the rest of the house while in the harem, gave eunuchs the role of message bearers. During the course of the Harem, racial segregation became common between eunuchs. Slave traders of white Circassian slaves enjoyed more business clout due to the inflated value of whiteness that existed during the Ottoman Empire.

However, contrary to restrictions; some concubines, mothers, sisters and grandmothers of the sultans of the Ottoman Empire exerted extraordinary political influence in a period called 'Sultanate of Women'. Their presence among the men and their power was not challenged by the ulema clergy.

=== Bathhouses ===
Segregation between men and women was strictly enforced in 18th-century Ottoman bathhouses. The rules on bathhouse segregation also restricted Muslim women from sharing a bathhouse with non-Muslim women, while Muslim men could share bathhouses with non-Muslim men. Shari'a courts held this up to preserve Muslim women's sanctity and prevent their violation.

== In Islamic countries ==
=== Afghanistan ===
Afghanistan, under Taliban religious leadership, was characterized by feminist groups and others as a "gender apartheid" system where women are segregated from men in public and do not enjoy legal equality or equal access to employment or education. In Islam, women have the right to equal access to employment and education, although their first priority should be that of the family. Also, Men are said to be actively involved in child rearing and household chores. Muhammad helped his wives in the house.

During Islamic Republic of Afghanistan (2004–2021), a huge number of Afghan men did not have any contact with females other than their own family until going to university. This caused men to not see women as their colleagues. Thus, they usually tended to show impolite behaviour to women, so thousands of women suffered from insults in the streets all over Afghanistan. During this period, gender segregation in Afghanistan's schools forced the strained Ministry of Education, which was already short on supplies, funding, and teachers, to recreate the system for each gender.

Baghe-Sharara (Persian: باغ شهرآرا) was a women-only park in Kabul during the Islamic Republic of Afghanistan. It is the ancient garden constructed by Babur. No men were allowed to enter because it was a women-only space. This garden was reconstructed by financial support from US, Italy and Switzerland and yearly, on March 8, programs specific to women were held there. Women-specific markets were held inside the garden as well. English and sewing classes, shops selling products, a counselling center, other classes, were all run by women.

Immediately after 2021 Taliban offensive all universities became sex-segregated nationwide. Since March 2022, Taliban started to segregate all amusement parks and resorts by sex. Ministry for the Propagation of Virtue and the Prevention of Vice (Afghanistan) stated that in Kabul, males can go to amusement parks on Wednesdays, Thursdays, Fridays and Saturdays, while females can go to amusement parks on Sundays, Mondays and Tuesdays. This ministry added that no one is allowed to complain, emphasizing that men are not allowed to enter parks on women's days.

=== Egypt ===
During the mid-20th century, movements in Egypt implemented laws regarding public sex segregation. This included the segregation of women on trains, organized by the Muslim Brotherhood. Before this new era, gender segregation was only applied to areas of religious ceremony.

The idea of a "Pink taxi" in Egypt emerged after numerous women demanded women-only cabs. Advocates of the idea claimed that the taxis would help shield women against possible harassment and sexual assault.

=== Iran ===
When Ruhollah Khomeini called for women to attend public demonstrations and ignore the night curfew, millions of women who would otherwise not have left their homes without their husbands' and fathers' permission or presence, took to the streets. After the Islamic revolution, however, Khomeini publicly announced his disapproval of mixing between the sexes. During Khomeini's rule, limits would be placed on what jobs a woman could possess, these laws would also uphold gender segregation in the workplace. Many women would not be given access to positions of political power without ties to male political elites or ties with religious leaders, movements, or activism. Prevention of women candidates is upheld by male-dominated political parties who have rejected women from being represented as their recommended candidates. All women who have run as candidates for president have been rejected with no reason given.

Critics have argued that the restriction of women's rights under Islamic law has led to the segregation of public and private spaces, which they must then attempt to resolve through politics and by creating their own spaces. Gender segregation also impacts the company that people keep; researcher Ziba Mir-Hosseini noted that during her field work, she spent most of her time around women and that in some instances she never met the male relatives of some of these women due to the strict regulation of gender segregation. These restrictions may also impact travel, as some rules state that married women are forbidden from traveling without their husband's permission. In some cases, women must be segregated from male passengers. Despite ongoing gender segregation efforts, women make up as much as 55 percent of the first year undergraduate student body. In pre-college level education, gender segregation has conflicted with religious laws. Article 13 of the Islamic Republic of Iran allows Christians, Jews, and Zoroastrians to educate their followers in whatever way their religion instructs them. Regardless of this law, boys and girls have been segregated from being in the same classroom. Boys and girls would also get different textbooks. These regulations on gender have moved the ceremonies and events of religious minorities, such as funerals and weddings, out of view from the public due to laws against the public mixture of sexes.

=== Iraq ===
Gender-isolated education is conducted through higher education due to religious ideas of sex segregation. Hotels and motels all have strict rules for sex segregation.

Historically, sex segregation was one of the reasons given by conservatives who opposed women's suffrage and political participation. When women's suffrage in Syria was introduced in 1949, MP Farhan al-Irs of al-Amara commented: "Women are shameful. How could they possibly sit with men?"

In 1951, a motion to include women in the Electoral Law was rejected in the Chamber of Deputies. During the discussion to change the electoral law to include women's suffrage in March–April 1951, the MP Abd al-Abbas of Diwaniyya opposed suffrage as this would contradict Islamic sex segregation, as elected women MP would then sit among male MPs in the Chamber of Deputies: "Is this not forbidden? Are we not all of Islam?"

A week of Women's Rights was launched in October 1953 by Iraqi Women's Union, who arranged a symposium and voiced their demand in radio programs and articles in the press to campaign for women's suffrage. As a response, the Islamic clergy launched a Week of Virtue and called for a general strike against women's suffrage and called for women to "stay at home" since women's suffrage was against Islam. During the Week of Virtue, the Sunni Nihal al-Zahawi, daughter of Amjad al-Zahawi, head of the Muslim Sisters Society (Jamiyyat al-Aukht al-Muslima), spoke on the radio against women's suffrage: she described the suffragists as women who revolted against the very Islam that gave them rights, and that women's suffrage was lamentable since it broke sex segregation and resulted in gender mixing, which was an unrestricted liberty that broke the rules of against Islam.

Women's suffrage was finally introduced in 1980.

=== Saudi Arabia ===
In Saudi Arabia, male doctors were previously not allowed to treat female patients unless there were no female specialists available; it was also not permissible for women to treat men. This has changed, however, and now it is not uncommon for men and women to visit doctors of the opposite sex.

Critics have argued that the restriction of women's rights under Saudi Arabia law, which is based on sharia law, has led to the separation of gender, since women and men are separated in almost all areas, from women-only fast food lines to women-only offices. These laws and policies are enforced by the Islamic religious police, which has prompted some to find ways to evade policing. Gender segregation also impacts the Saudi education system, as there are more opportunities for men to graduate with a career and find employment. Women do not share in these opportunities and have a more difficult time finding employment as there are only a small number of locations that permit men and women to mix. Gender segregation also impacts the participation of women in religion by encouraging women to pray at home and not in the mosque. Scholars have stated that despite these restrictions, changes brought about with the new generations have allowed women more freedom to choose whether they pray at the mosque or in their homes.

=== Syria ===
Historically, sex segregation played an important role in the conservative opposition toward women's choice to not wear the hijab. During the interwar period, there was an intense campaign in Syria about women's rights to choose to not wear a hijab if they did not wish to do so. Since the hijab was a form of sex segregation, to stop wearing it met with great opposition by conservatives who viewed it as a form of ending of sex segregation. The right for women to unveil was also a part of the progressive ending of sex segregation and women's right to participate in society, as well as the question of women's suffrage.

During the visit of the King–Crane Commission in Damascus in 1919, women's rights activists (of the Nur al-Fayha organization) attended unveiled to demonstrate the progressive modernist ambitions of the Faisal Government. During a nationalist demonstration in Damascus during a visit of Lord Balfour, the women demanded the abolition of the veil, which created tension with their male counterparts. When a petition on women's suffrage was discussed in the Syrian Congress in 1920, Shaykh Abd al-Qadir al-Kaylani stated that to give women the right to vote would be the same thing as abolishing sex segregation and allowing women to appear unveiled.

Women's rights activists in the modernist interwar period viewed the veil as a hindrance to women's participation in society as productive citizens, preventing them from benefiting a successful independent nation, and combined their criticism against hijab with their criticism against colonialism. In 1922, during a women's march in protest of the imprisonment of Shahbandar by the French, the participating women removed their veils.

In the 1920s, the feminist women's press in Lebanon and Syria published images of unveiled Turkish women and gave room to women's voices when the indigenous press normally avoided mentioning or showing images of women. The modernization reform program of Atatürk in Turkey abolished sex segregation and encouraged women to unveil as a part of a social revolution in order to make Turkey a modern state. The social revolution in Turkey created a debate in Syria, where Turkish postcards displayed modern unveiled Turkish women, and according to the US Consul in Damascus in 1922: "I am informed that they attract considerable attention in local feminine circles", and the women's magazine Dimashqiya (The New Woman) celebrated Ataturk for his reforms and published photographs of unveiled Turkish woman.

During the 1920s, upper-class women in Syria started to appear unveiled in public, which caused great opposition from religious conservatives, who sometimes attacked unveiled women with acid. When the conservative Shaykh Taj became Prime minister in Damascus in 1928, a campaign started by preachers in the mosques who called upon believers to attack unveiled women, which was followed by men attacking unveiled women on the street with acid; and a women's march against the hijab, which was held in Hamidiya was attacked by a mob.

The fact that women started to appear unveiled in public during the interwar era created great opposition; Islamic conservatives debated on whether women should be allowed to appear in public, and unveiled women were harassed in order to frighten women from accessing the public space. The Islamist group al-gharra demanded that all women be forced to veil completely from head to toe, while the French colonial press condemned the men who made unveiled women afraid to leave their home in fear of violence. As a reaction to the progressive unveiling trend among women, the League of Modesty was founded by conservative women in 1934, whose members patrolled the streets in white shrouds and attacked unveiled women armed with scissors and bottles of acid.

In the 1940s, Thuraya Al-Hafez campaigned for women's right to choose if she wished to veil or not. In the summer of 1943, Thuraya Al-Hafez headed a women's march of 100 women to the Marja Square in Damascus demonstrating against hijab, with the claim that the Quran did not demand for women to veil. In 1944, Islamic groups in Syria demanded sex segregation in schools and public transport, to prohibit women from visiting the cinema, and that women be forced to wear hijab by a morality police. To appease the Islamic groups, the government introduced sex segregation on public transportation in Damascus during religious holidays in 1944. In May 1944, a rumour was spread that a ball attended by unveiled Muslim women was to take place at Nuqtar al-halib. As a response, the Islamic al-ghurra group launched a campaign in the mosques with the demanded that the government stop the ball, and riots occurred in Damascus, Aleppo, Homs and Hamah. In response, Adila Bayyhum, a member of the Nuqtat al-halib, stopped her philanthropic distribution of milk to the poor until the government threatened to stop their own grain distribution if the Islamic riot campaign did not stop.

During the Ba'athist regime (1963–2024), women were legally free to veil or unveil, and sex segregation was not imposed.

=== Mandate Palestine ===
On the late 19th and early 20th century European Jewish immigration to Palestine, Norman Rose writes that secular "Zionist mores" were "often at odds with Arab convention, threatening the customs and moral assumptions that lent cohesion to a socially conservative, traditional Palestinian society." The active political role of the women of the Yishuv and their lack of segregation was judged as particularly offensive.

=== Malaysia ===
The policy on gender segregation in Kelantan, Malaysia, is drawn based on Islamic teachings as interpreted by the state government leaders. It does not allow only men spectators at sports tournaments involving female players. Another example of sex segregation in Kelantan, Malaysia, is gender-specific counters in supermarkets.

=== United States ===
In the United States, Muslim couples may opt for gender-segregated wedding celebrations so that men and women sit separately during the ceremony and celebrate in different rooms. Men and women, who are guests, do not sit together at the wedding ceremony, because it is seen as a 'time out' from the usual mixing of the sexes.

== In mosques ==
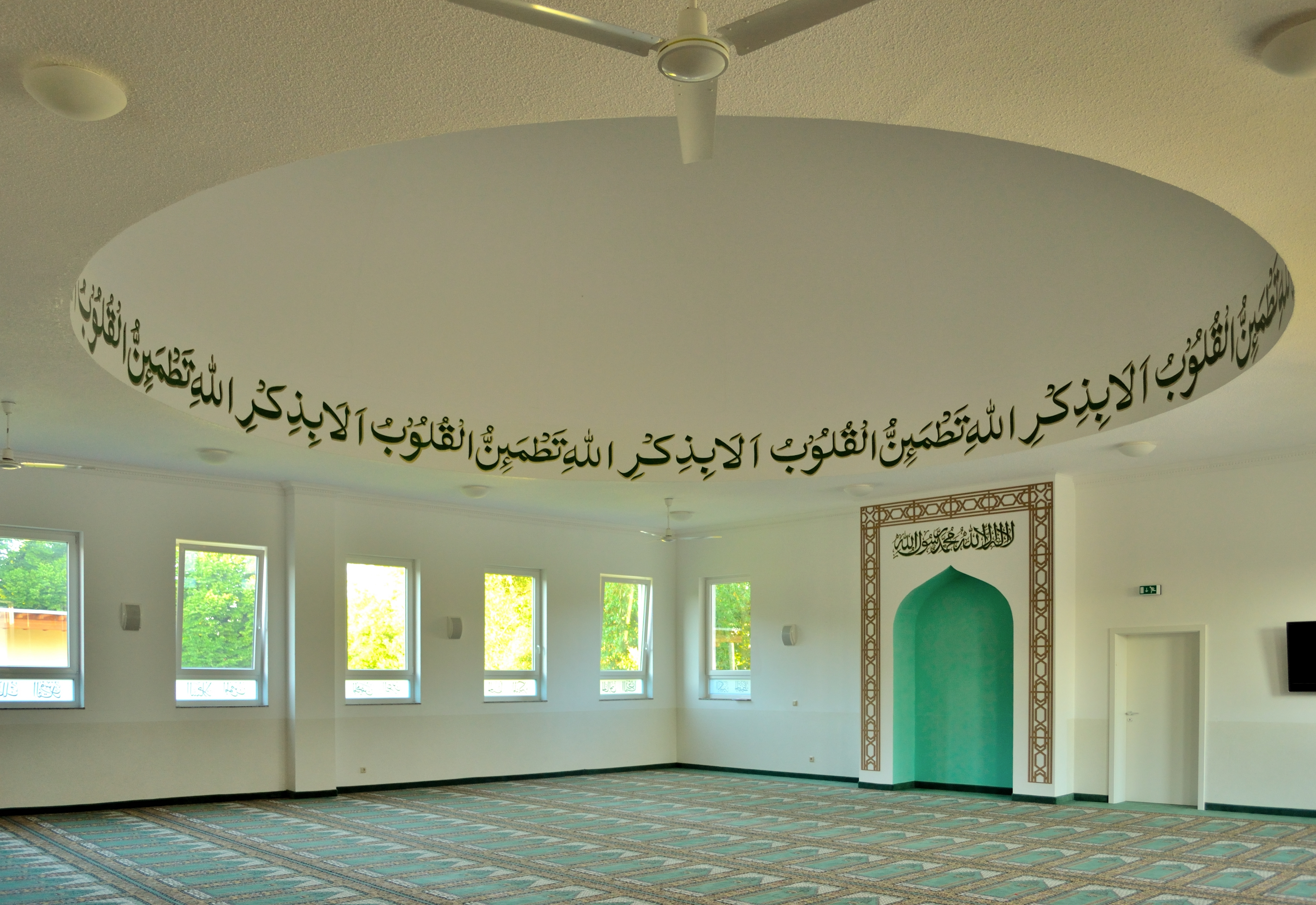
The ladies' prayer hall in the Khadija Mosque in Berlin; upper part reads: Only in the remembrance of Allah will your hearts find peace (in Arabic)

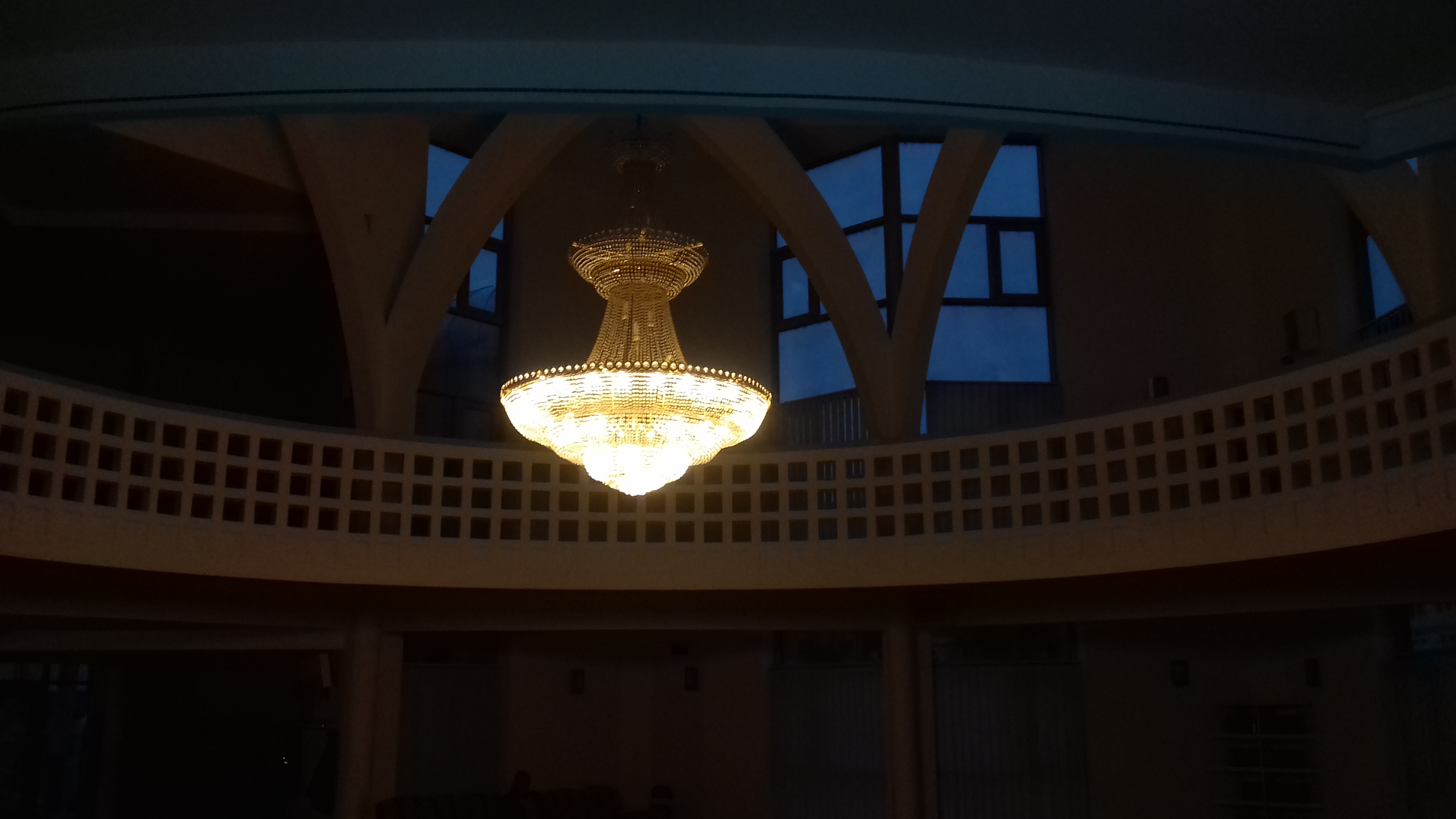
Makhphil (makfil), upper gallery plateau part of Bosnian mosques reserved only for women (except when Jumu'ah) who climb to it by stairs at side(s) of entrance; White/Nasser's mosque in Zenica

Some schools of thought say that women should be encouraged to pray at home rather than in a mosque. However, other schools prefer to look at the context of the sayings, which, they suggest, were given at a time when women were in danger when leaving their homes, and consider mosques to be as welcome for women as their homes. Muhammad did not forbid women from entering his mosque in Medina. In fact, he told Muslims "not to prevent their women from going to mosque when they ask for permission".

Muhammad specifically admonished the men not to keep their wives from going to the mosques:

The Messenger of God said, "Do not prevent the maid-servants of God from going to the mosque."

— Muslim, No.888 (See also Nos. 884–891 and Bukhari Vol.1, Nos. 824, 832)

The segregation of sexes in mosques and prayer spaces is reported in a hadith in Sahih Muslim, one of the two most authentic Hadith books in Islam. It says that the best rows for men are the first rows, and the worst ones the last ones, and the best rows for women are the last ones and the worst ones for them are the first ones.

It is also recorded that Muhammad ordered that mosques have separate doors for women and men so that men and women would not be obliged to go and come through the same door. He also commanded that after the Isha' evening prayer, women be allowed to leave the mosque first so that they would not have to mix with men.

After Muhammad's death, many of his followers began to forbid women under their control from going to the mosque. Aisha bint Abi Bakr, a wife of Muhammad, once said, "If the Prophet had lived now and if he saw what we see of women today, he would have forbidden women to go to the mosque even as the Children of Israel forbade their women."

The second caliph Umar also prohibited women from attending mosques, especially at night, because he feared there might be occasions of harassment by men, so he asked them to pray at home.

As Islam spread, it became unusual for women to worship in mosques because of male fear of immorality between sexes.

Sometimes, a special part of the mosque was railed off for women. For example, the governor of Mecca in 870 had ropes tied between the columns to make a separate place for women.

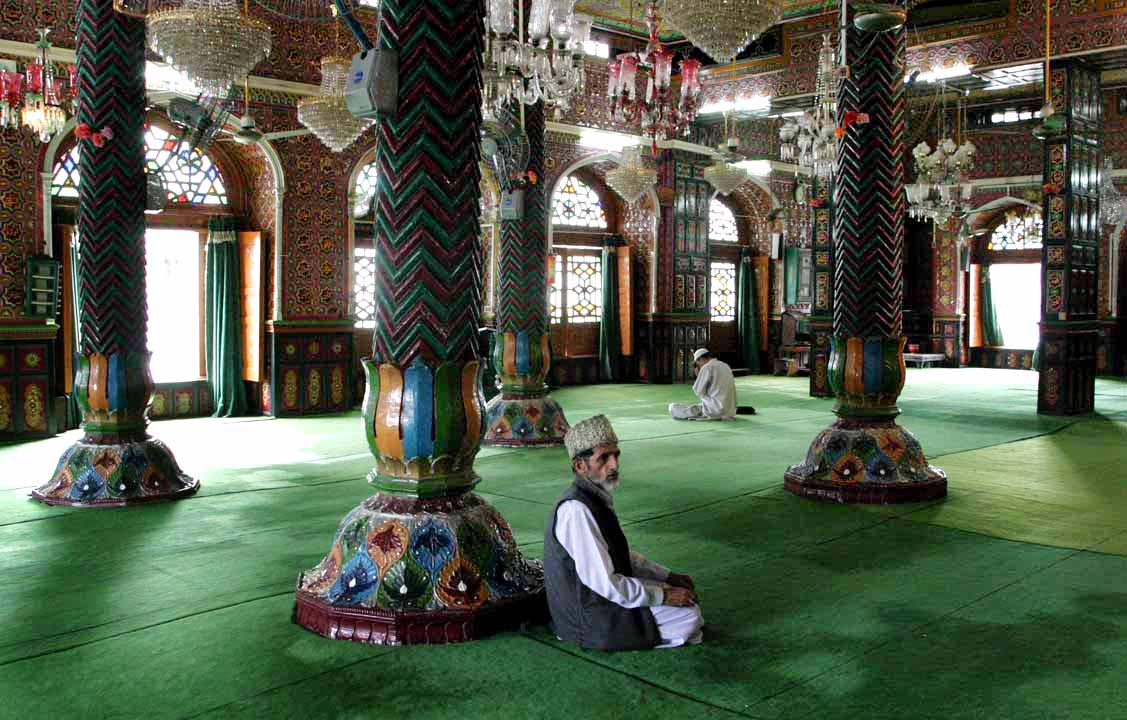
The male section of a mosque in Srinagar, Jammu and Kashmir, India

Many mosques today put the women behind a barrier or partition or in another room. Mosques in South and Southeast Asia put men and women in separate rooms, as the divisions were built into them centuries ago. In nearly two-thirds of American mosques, women pray behind partitions or in separate areas, not in the main prayer hall. Some mosques do not admit women at all due to the "lack of space" and the fact that some prayers, such as the Friday Jumuʻah, are mandatory for men but optional for women, although there are sections exclusively for women and children. The Grand Mosque in Mecca is desegregated.

There is a growing women's movement led by figures such as Asra Nomani who protest against what they regard as their second-class status and facilities.

Justifications for segregation include the need to avoid distraction during prayer, although the primary reason cited is that this was the tradition (sunnah) of worshipers in the time of Muhammad.

== See also ==
- Gender separation in Judaism
- Harem
- Women-only park
- Islamic Bill of Rights for Women in the Mosque
- Marriage in Islam
- Namus, virtue, used in a gender-specific way
- Purdah, a physically separate area for women
- Women's mosques
- Negiah

Case studies:

- Golden Needle Sewing School
- Mechitza, barrier that separates men and women in Jewish synagogues
