= William Carlos Williams Award =

American poetry award

The William Carlos Williams Award is given out by the Poetry Society of America for a poetry book published by a small press, non-profit, or university press.

The award is endowed by the family and friends of Geraldine Clinton Little, a poet and author of short stories and former vice-president of the society. The award is a prize of $500.

== Winners ==
- 2026 Diana Arterian Agrippina the Younger, Judge: Alan Gilbert
- 2025 Philip Metres, Fugitive/Refuge, Judge: David Baker
- 2024 Elizabeth Arnold, Wave House, Brian Teare, Poem Bitten by a Man, Judge: Daisy Fried
- 2023 Kathy Fagan, Bad Hobby, Judge: Craig Morgan
- 2022 Patrick Rosal, The Last Thing: New & Selected Poems, Judge: Erika Meitner
- 2021 Khadijah Queen, Anodyne, Judge: Dara Barrois/Dixon
- 2020 Martha Collins, Because What Else Could I Do, Judge: Alice Fulton
- 2019 G. C. Waldrep, feast gently, Judge: Laura Kasischke
- 2018 Jennifer Chang, Some Say the Lark, Judge: Paisley Rekdal
- 2017 Monica Youn, Blackacre, Judge: Robin Coste Lewis
- 2016 Brandon Shimoda, Evening Oracle, Judge: Katie Peterson
- 2015 Jennifer Moxley, The Open Secret, Judge: Ange Mlinko
- 2014 Ron Padgett, Collected Poems, Judge: Thomas Lux
- 2013 Naomi Replansky, Collected Poems, Judge: B. H. Fairchild
- 2012 Bruce Smith, Devotions, Judge: Elizabeth Macklin
- 2011 Mary Ruefle, Selected Poems, Judge: Rodney Jones
- 2010 Eleanor Ross Taylor, Captive Voices, Judge: Lynn Emanuel
- 2009 Linda Gregg, All of It Singing: New and Selected Poems, Judge: James Longenbach
- 2008 Aram Saroyan, Complete Minimal Poems, Judge: Ron Silliman
- 2007 Matthew Zapruder, The Pajamaist, Judge: Tony Hoagland
- 2006 Brenda Hillman, Pieces of Air in the Epic, Judge: Marjorie Welish
- 2004 Anthony Butts, Little Low Heaven, Judge: Lucie Brock-Broido
- 2003 Gary Young, No Other Life, Judge: Angela Jackson
- 2002 Li-Young Lee, Book of My Nights (American Poets Continuum), Judge: Carolyn Kizer
- 2001 Ralph J. Mills, Grasses Standing: Selected Poems, Judge: Fanny Howe
- 2000 Kathleen Peirce, The Oval Hour Judge: Jean Valentine
- 1999 B.H. Fairchild, The Art of the Lathe, Judge: Garrett Hongo
- 1998 John Balaban, Locusts at the Edge of Summer: New and Selected Poems, Judge: Robert Phillips
- 1995 Cyrus Cassells, Soul Make a Path Through Shouting
- 1994 David Ray, Wool Highways
- 1992 Louise Glück, The Wild Iris
- 1990 Safiya Henderson-Holmes, Madness and a Bit of Hope
- 1989 Diane Wakoski, Emerald Ice: Selected Poems 1962-1987
- 1987 Alan Shapiro, Happy Hour
- 1980 Robert Hass, Praise
- 1979 David Ray, The Tramp's Cup
- 1978 David Lincoln Fisher, Teachings, Judges: Josephine Miles, Louis Simpson, and Reed Whittemore

== See also ==
- American poetry
- List of poetry awards
- List of literary awards
- List of years in poetry
- List of years in literature
