= Texas State University MFA =

Educational program

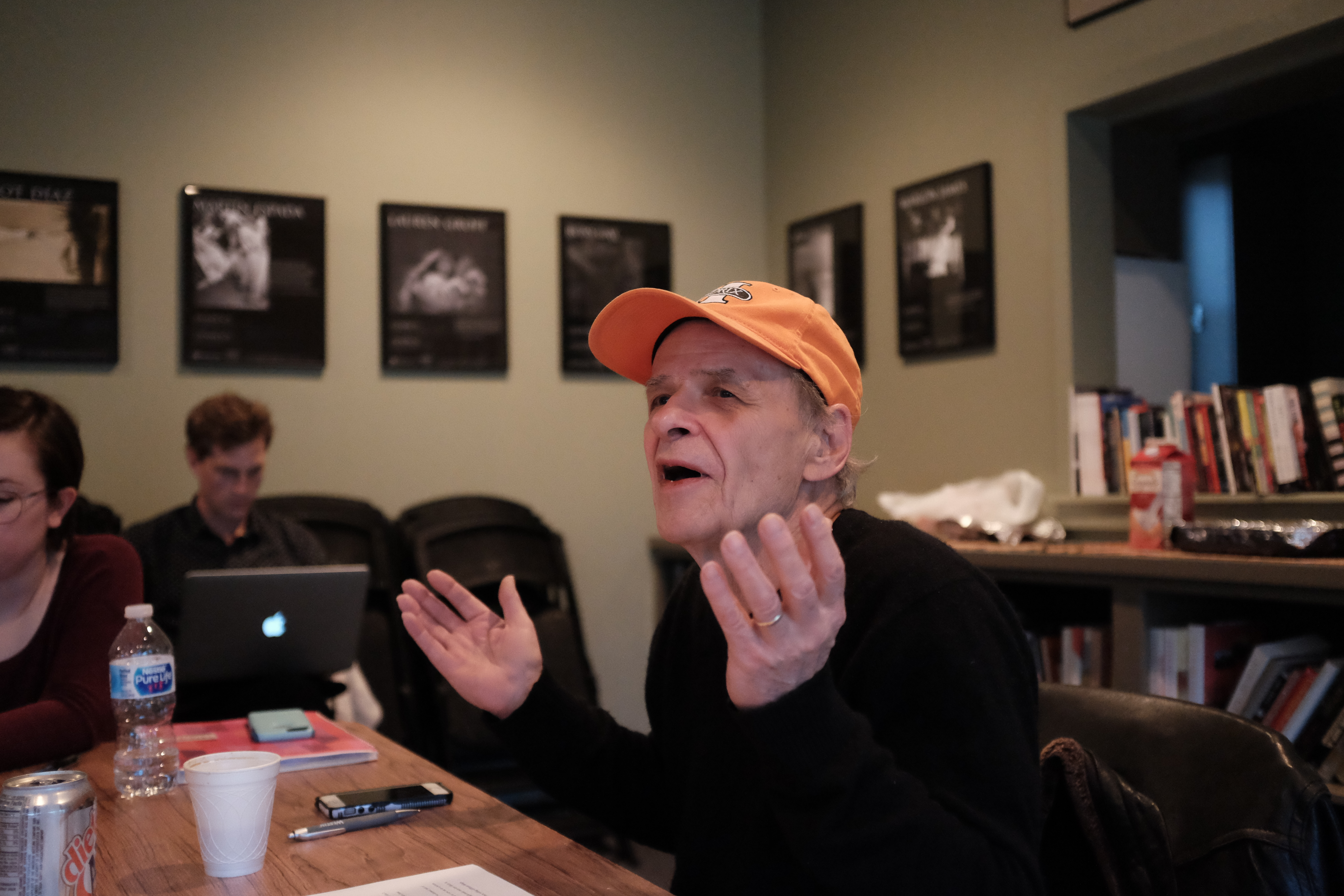
Tim O'Brien holds workshop at Texas State's Katherine Anne Porter House

The Texas State University Master of Fine Arts in Creative Writing is a three-year graduate program at Texas State University in San Marcos, Texas, USA. Fiction writer Doug Dorst is the current director of the program.

Texas State's MFA program ranked 45th out of 131 full-residency graduate writing programs in the Poets & Writers survey for the application year 2012, the final year the rankings were released. The program was also cited by The New York Times as having the vision "to build a program that might rival the famed Iowa Writers' Workshop."

As of Fall 2018, 90% of Texas State MFA students received full funding through a combination of scholarships and assistantships.

MFA students staff Porter House Review, the program's online literary journal. The publication features work by established and emerging writers from around the world. Working for the journal allows students to gain experience as editors, work with visiting instructors from across the publishing industry, and earn up to six credit hours for their work. Porter House Review was preceded as the program's literary journal by Front Porch Journal, which ran from 2006 to 2018.

== Faculty ==
- Cyrus Cassells, Poetry
- Doug Dorst, Fiction/Program Director
- Jennifer duBois, Fiction
- Tom Grimes, Fiction
- Roger Jones, Poetry
- Debra Monroe, Fiction
- Tim O'Brien, Professor of Creative Writing
- Cecily Parks, Poetry
- Kathleen Peirce, Poetry
- Steve Wilson, Poetry
- Naomi Shihab Nye, Poetry

== Endowed Chair in Creative Writing ==
Each year, the Endowed Chair in Creative Writing teaches one graduate MFA workshop. The Chair holder also visits classes and gives two readings. MFA students may take a workshop with only one Endowed Chair holder.

National Book Award Winner Tim O'Brien held the Chair every other year from 2003 through 2012. Now, as Professor of Creative Writing, he teaches six MFA workshops annually. Every workshop is open to every student.

Endowed Chairs in Creative Writing:

- Ai, 2002-2003
- Tim O'Brien, 2003-2004
- Barry Hannah, 2004-2005
- Tim O'Brien, 2005-2006
- Denis Johnson, 2006-2007
- Tim O'Brien, 2007-2008
- Li-Young Lee, 2008-2009
- Tim O'Brien, 2009-2010
- Robert Stone, 2010-2011
- Tim O'Brien, 2011-2012
- Cristina García, 2012-2014
- Ben Fountain, 2014-2016
- Karen Russell, 2016-2020
- Téa Obreht, 2020-2022
- Kali Fajardo-Anstine, 2022-2024

== Adjunct Thesis Faculty ==
Texas State's adjunct thesis faculty is composed of nationally recognized writers who will read students' entire thesis manuscripts and then send written personal comments, offering one-to-one readings of the books students write during their time in the program.

Fiction faculty includes:

- Rick Bass
- Kevin Brockmeier
- Maxine Chernoff
- Catherine Chung
- John Dufresne
- Fernando Flores
- Amy Hempel
- Antonya Nelson
- Idra Novey
- Karen Olsson
- Alberto Ríos
- Elissa Schappell
- Bennett Sims
- Kevin Wilson

Poetry faculty:

- Hala Alyan
- Catherine Barnett
- Victoria Chang
- Jennifer Chang
- Natalie Diaz
- Carolyn Forché
- Laurie Ann Guerrero
- Joanna Klink
- Ada Limón
- Alessandra Lynch
- Khadijah Queen
- Spencer Reece
- Sam Sax
- Charif Shanahan
- Brian Turner
- Monica Youn

== Visiting Writers Series ==
Since Fall 2016, Texas State's MFA Visiting Writers Series has hosted twenty esteemed writers. Among the writers are five Pulitzer Prize winners, five MacArthur Fellows, four National Book Award winners, eight Guggenheim Fellows, eight NEA Fellows, two LA Times Book Prize winners, one Man Booker Prize winner, seven NBCC Award finalists, three PEN/Faulkner Award finalists and two Stegner Fellows. On average, the Texas State visiting writers spend six hours more with the MFA students in comparison to any other MFA program around the country. The series are held on Thursdays at the Wittliff Collections in Texas State's Alkek Library, and on Fridays at the Katherine Anne Porter Literary Center in the nearby town of Kyle. The literary center is maintained by the MFA program, and was the childhood home of Pulitzer Prize and National Book Award winner Katherine Anne Porter. It was added to the National Register of Historic Places in 2006.

== Writer-in-Residence ==
Every spring, a writer-in-residence joins the MFA program for a series of readings, master classes, workshops, manuscript consultations, and other collaborative events.

The Spring 2019 writer-in-residence was Ada Limón.

== Clark Prize ==
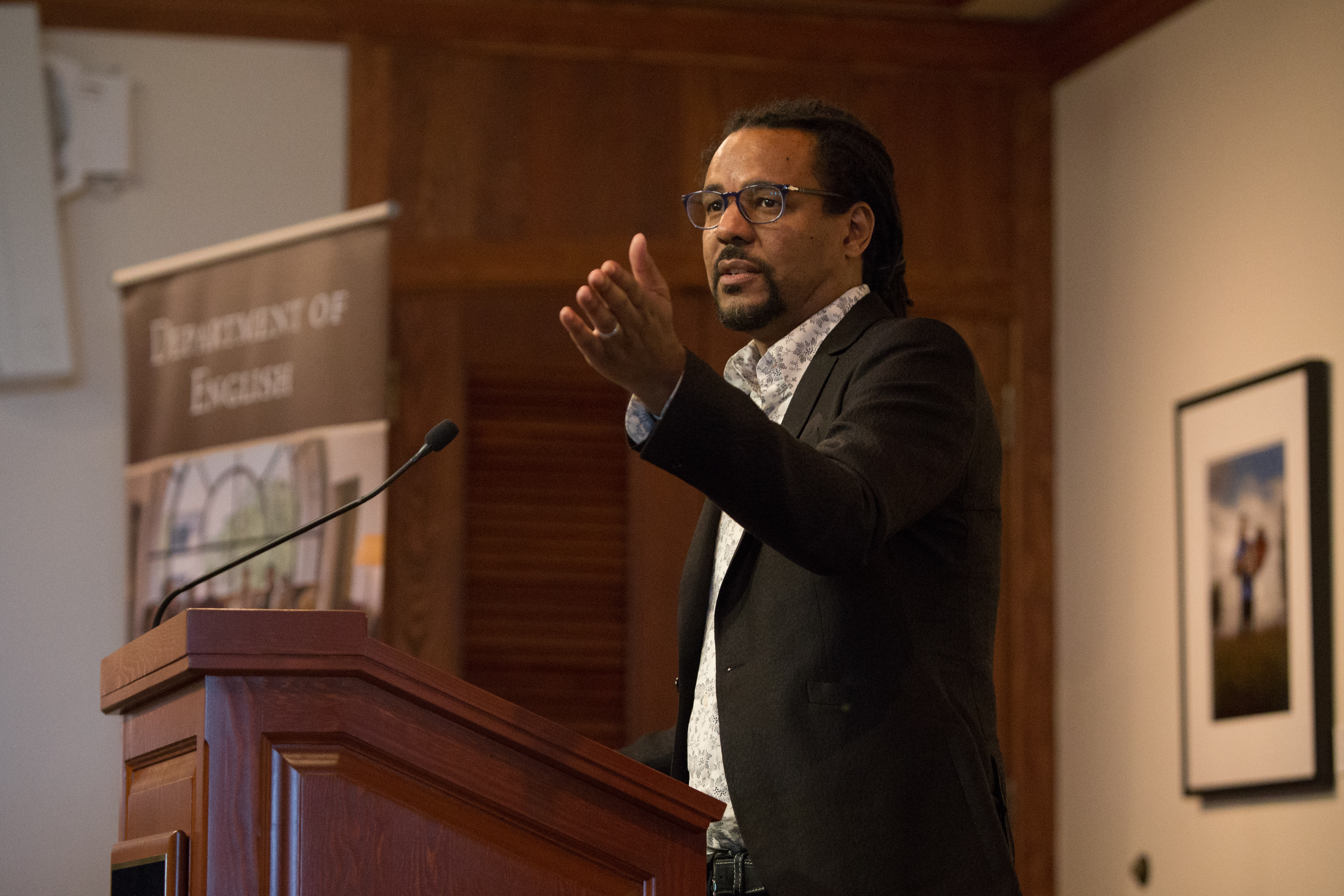
Colson Whitehead gives a reading at Texas State

The L.D. and LaVerne Harrell Clark Fiction Prize is a $25,000 award recognizing an exceptional recently-published book-length work of fiction. The Clark Fiction Prize is awarded annually by the Texas State University English Department.

- Jim Shepard, The Book of Aron, 2016
- Colson Whitehead, The Underground Railroad, 2017
- Daniel Alarcón, The King is Always Above the People, 2018
- Rebecca Makkai, The Great Believers, 2019
- Chia-Chia Lin, The Unpassing, 2020
