= Sex segregation in Saudi Arabia =

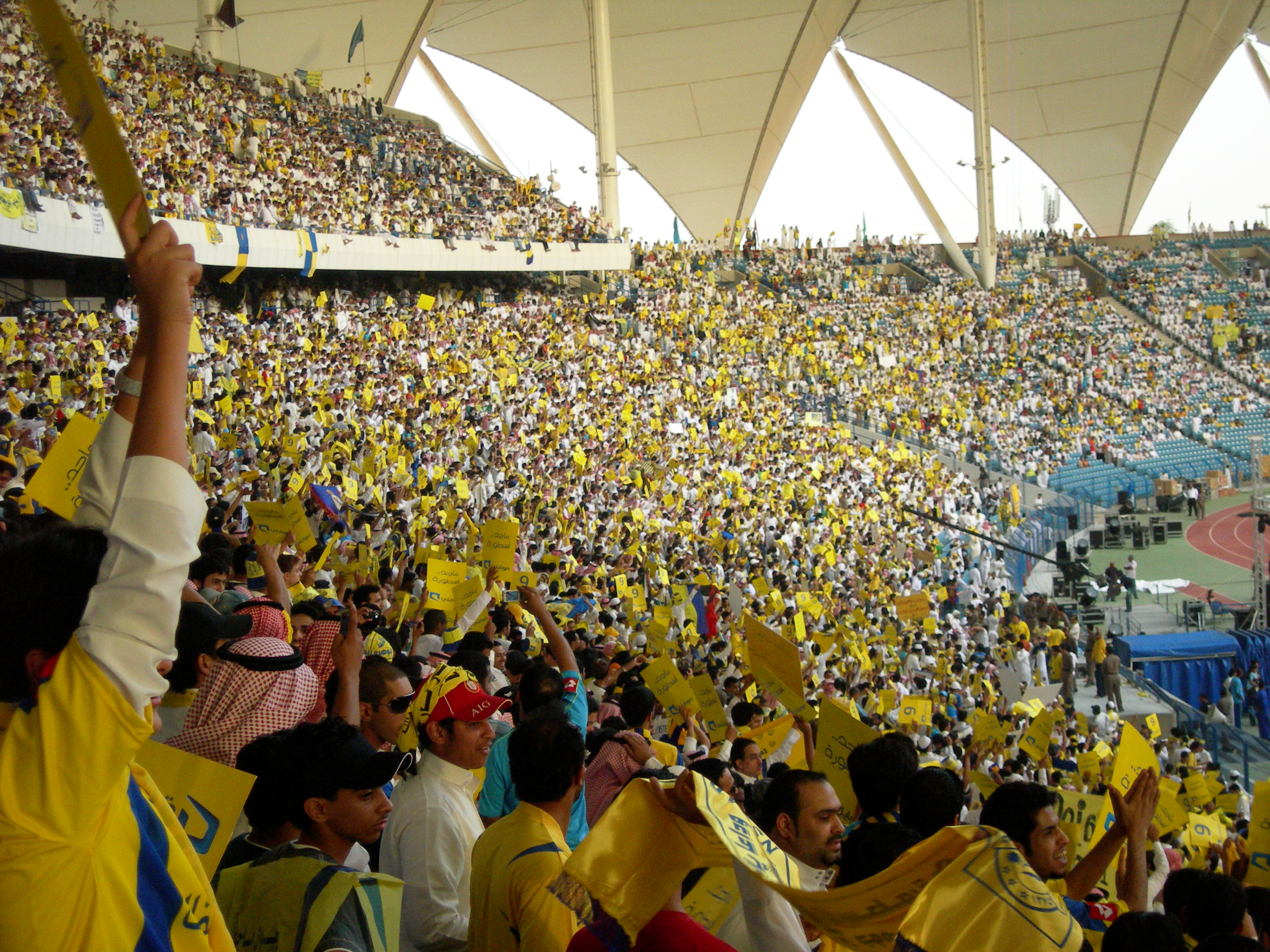
A full stadium in Saudi Arabia with no women in the crowd. There are many female-only and male-only places in Saudi Arabia.

Sexual segregation in Saudi Arabia is a cultural practice and government policy which keeps Saudi wives, sisters and daughters away from contact with male strangers (non-mahram) and vice versa. However, since Mohammed bin Salman was appointed Crown Prince in 2017, a series of social reforms have been witnessed that created cultural changes, which included putting an end to the sex (gender) segregation enforcement. The Saudi sex segregation originated from an extreme concern for female purity and family honour. Social events used to be largely predicated on the separation of men and women; the mixing of non-related (in technical terms, non-mahram) men and women at parties and other social gatherings were extremely rare and limited to some of the modern Western-educated families.

== Foundation of sex segregation ==
Saudi Arabia has been called an epicenter of sex segregation, stemming partially from its conservative Sunni Islamic practices and partially from its monarchy's legal constraints. Sex segregation in Saudi Arabia is not inherent to the country's culture, but was promoted in the 1980s and 1990s by the government, the Sahwa movement, and conservative and religious behavioral enforcers (i.e. police, government officers, etc.).

Currently, Saudi Arabia is the most profoundly sex-segregated nation on Earth.

== Punishments of mingling with opposite sex ==
Anyone who is seen socializing with someone of the opposite sex who is not a relative, can be harassed by the mutaween (in Arabic: مطوعون), even charged with committing adultery, fornication or prostitution. However, since 2016 the Saudi cabinet has barred the religious police from arresting, questioning, or pursuing anyone.

== Sex segregation in homes and public places ==
=== Sex segregation in home architecture ===
Many Saudi traditional homes have one entrance for men and another for women. For non-related males to enter the female sections of a Saudi home is a violation of family honour. The Arab word for the secluded section of the house is harim which means at once 'forbidden' and 'sacred'. Private space is associated with women while the public space, such as the living room, is reserved for men. Traditional house designs also use high walls, compartmentalized inner rooms, and curtains to protect the family and particularly women from the public.

Moreover, sex segregation was expected in public. In restaurants, banks and other public places in Saudi Arabia, men and women are required to enter and exit through separate doors. However, since 2019, Saudi Arabia no longer enforces sex segregation in restaurants and some other places.

=== Sex segregation in public places ===
Since the public sphere of life is the domain of men, women are expected to be veiled outside the secluded areas of their homes. Non-mahram women and men must minimize social interaction. Companies traditionally have been expected to create all-female areas if they hire women. Public transportation is segregated all over the country. Public places such as beaches and amusement parks are also segregated, sometimes by time, so that boys and men, and girls and women attend at different hours. Special amusement parks for women, so-called "women parks" have been created. Violation of the principles of sex segregation is known as khilwa. Western companies often enforce Saudi religious regulations, which has prompted some Western activists to criticise those companies. McDonald's, Pizza Hut, Starbucks, and other US firms, for instance, maintain segregated eating zones in their restaurants. The facilities in the families' section are usually lower in quality. Men and women may, sometimes, mix in restaurants of Western luxury hotels that cater primarily to noncitizens.

Segregation was particularly strict in restaurants, since eating requires removal of the veil. Most restaurants in Saudi Arabia used to have "family" and "bachelor" sections, the latter for unmarried men or men without a family to accompany. Women or men with their families have to sit in the family section. In the families section, diners are usually seated in separate rooms or behind screens and curtains. Waiters are expected to give time for women to cover up before entering, although this practice is not always followed. Restaurants typically have an entrance for women who come without their husbands or mahram [casually their brothers], although if they are allowed in, they will be guided to the family section. Women are barred from waitressing, except at a few women-only restaurants.

There are many women parks in Saudi Arabia. The first female-only Trampoline park was established in 2018 in country's capital by Bounce.

Typical examples of segregation include:

Establishment	Segregation
Banks	Separate branches for men and women, but when a women's section is not available at a branch, women are allowed in the male branch. Some banks are female-only (see Women-only banks).
Coffeeshops	Mostly men only, although a few have family sections.
Hospitals	Both male and female physicians may treat male and female patients. Most nurses are female and mix freely. Appointment waiting rooms are usually segregated.
Hotels	Single women no longer require written permission to be allowed to check in, provided they have their own ID cards.
Pools	Gyms, pools and spas are generally restricted to men only, but some female facilities are available.
Museums	Separate opening hours for families and men ("families" typically include single women).
Restaurants	Separate sections for families and men. The vast majority will allow single women into the family section.
Shopping malls	Allow all visitors, but often with evenings and weekends reserved for families and single women only.
Shops	Usually allow all visitors.
Waiting areas	Often segregated. Even in mixed waiting areas, non-mahram men and women should sit at a distance from each other, such as in different rows or clusters of seats.

=== Sex segregation in academic institutions ===
Universities are male-only or female-only. Saudi Arabia is home to the largest female-only university in the world, Princess Nourah Bint Abdul Rahman University, but Effat University was the most well-known until 2022. King Saud University Girls Campus has different colleges only for females.

The King Abdullah University of Science and Technology, which opened in September 2009, is a coeducational campus where men and women study alongside each other. It was the first Saudi university to run a mixed class.

All schools are sex segregated, there are only boy or girl schools. The first private formal school for girls, the Madrasat AlBanat AlAhliah was established in 1941.

=== Hotels ===
The Luthan hotel was the first Saudi women's only hotel, acting more as a vacation spot for women than a mandated segregated institution. Upon entering the hotel, women are allowed to remove their headscarves and abayas and the hotel employs only women, calling their bellhops the world's first bellgirls, providing opportunities for Saudi women in IT and engineering jobs where, outside the Luthan, are quite scarce.

== Public reception ==
Even though the removal of certain religious and government heads has made way for liberal agendas to promote desegregation, the public largely still subscribes to the idea of a segregated society, while institutions and the government itself still technically remain under the control of Wahhabism. Reform is small in size, since there is no constitution to back up policy changes concerning sex segregation. The Saudi people refer to this segregation as khilwa and violation of the separation is punishable by law. This separation is tangibly manifested in the recently erected wall in places that employ both men and women, a feat possible by a law passed in 2011 allowing Saudi women to work in lingerie shops in order to lower female unemployment rates. The public views the 1.6 meter wall favorably, saying that it will lead to less instances of harassment by men visiting the expatriate women in the shops.

The United Nations and Western countries have encouraged Saudi kings to end strict segregation of institutions such as schools, government institutions, hospitals, and other public spaces.

== Recent attempts to remove sex segregation ==
Sex segregation is practiced since old times in Saudi Arabia. However, on 8 December 2019, a new rule was announced to reduce gender segregation in restaurants and cafes as they will no longer be required to have separate areas for families and bachelors.

Exceptions to segregation rules sometimes include hospitals, medical colleges, and banks. The number of mixed-gender workplaces has increased since King Abdullah was crowned, although they are still not common. Several newspaper publishers have desegregated their offices.

As a practical matter, gender mixing is going to become fairly common in parts of daily life. Nowadays, women customarily take taxis driven by men and they can drive by themselves while in the past they were not allowed to drive and were chauffeured by males. Many households have maids, who mix with the unrelated men of the households. Maids, taxi drivers, and waiters tend to be foreigners, which is sometimes used as a reason to be less strict about segregation.

As part of its reform drive, the kingdom lifted the prohibition of women entering sports stadiums. Saudi women were allowed to watch a football match in a stadium for the first time in January 2018. The women were segregated from the male-only sections, and were seated in the "family section".

== Opposition to mixing between the two sexes ==
Gender segregation in the public domain has become a cornerstone of the Saudi interpretation of Islam. This obligation to hide the female form from men who are not family, so perplexing and unsettling to outsiders, can be complicated for Saudis too.

The opening of the first co-educational university in 2009 caused a debate over segregation. A prominent cleric argued that segregation cannot be grounded in Sharia. He suggested those who advocate it are hypocrites:

Mixing was part of normal life for the Ummah (Muslim world) and its societies ... Those who prohibit the mixing of the genders actually live it in their real lives, which is an objectionable contradiction as every fair-minded Muslim should follow Shariah judgments without excess or negligence. In many Muslim houses—even those of Muslims who say mixing is haram (forbidden)—you can find female servants working around unrelated males.

In 2008 Khamisa Mohammad Sawadi, a 75-year-old woman, was sentenced to 40 lashes and imprisonment for allowing a man to deliver bread to her directly in her home, and then, as she was a non-citizen, was deported.

In 2010, a clerical adviser to the Royal court and Ministry of Justice issued a fatwa suggesting that women should provide breast milk to their employed drivers thereby making them relatives (a concept known as Rada). The driver could then be trusted to be alone with the woman. The fatwa was ridiculed by women campaigners.

Shaikh Abdul-Rahman al-Barrak said in a fatwa the mixing of genders at the workplace or in education “as advocated by modernisers” is prohibited because it allows “sight of what is forbidden, and forbidden talk between men and women”.

== See also ==
- Women park
- Single-sex education
- Committee for the Promotion of Virtue and the Prevention of Vice (Saudi Arabia)
- non-mahram
