= Sex segregation in Iran =

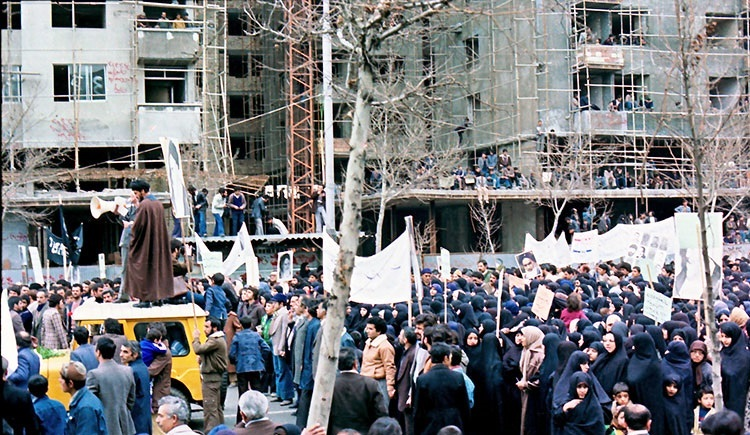
The presence of segregated men and women in the Iranian Revolution, 1978

Sex segregation in Iran encompasses practices derived from the doctrine of Shia Islam predominant in Iran. Sex segregation is strictly enforced. In many cities, there are women-only parks. Sex segregation prohibits males from viewing females, and age of consent laws do not exist, as all sexual activity outside marriage is illegal.

After the Islamic Revolution in 1979, there began a sex-based segregation of public places. All schools are segregated by sex for students and teachers. Beaches and pools are segregated by sex as required under national Iranian law. Pre-marital relationships between boys and girls are strictly banned. However, certain parts of Iranian society, primarily in wealthy urban neighborhoods, have accepted relationships between unmarried individuals despite it being illegal.

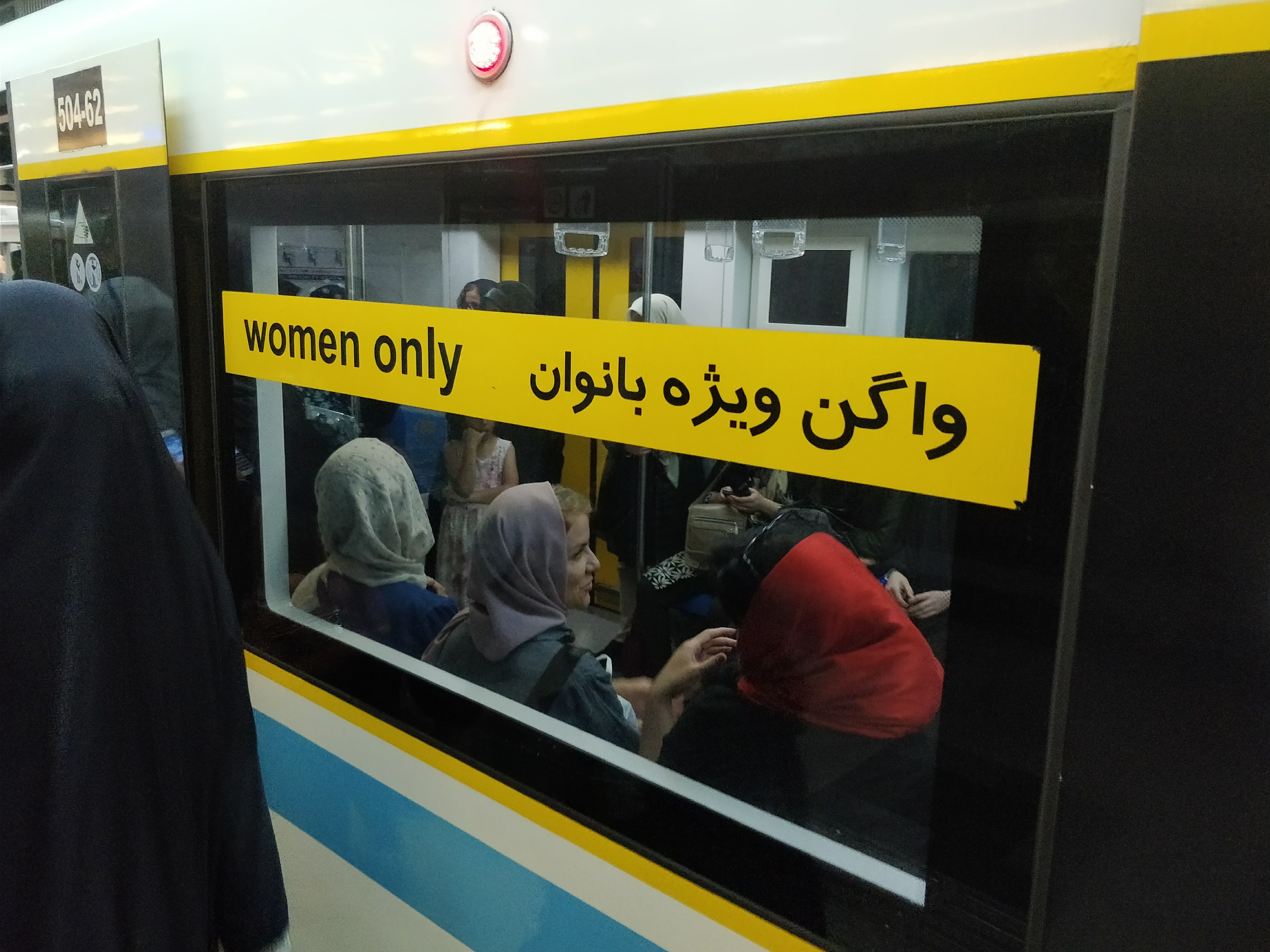
Women-only wagon in the Tehran Metro

The Tehran Metro has wagons specifically designated for females only. In recent years males have often attempted to break the law, and in present times there have been cases of men entering the female-only wagons. There are many women-only parks all over the country and all beauty salons prohibit the entry of men and boys. Due to extreme sex segregation in the past, Iranian mothers typically chose a wife for their son, and largely continue to do so.

== Historical evolution of sex segregation in Iran ==
=== Qajar era (1789–1925) ===
During Qajar dynasty, sex segregation was severe all over Iran. Men and women were not allowed to walk with each other in streets. There were always wardens on Laleh-Zar Street to separate men and women. The officers monitored sidewalks to make sure that men or women don't exit their designated areas.

According to biographies, during Naser al-Din Shah Qajar era, adolescent boys and girls were not allowed to meet each other and all marriages were formed through interference of their parents.

=== Reza Shah era (1925-1941) ===
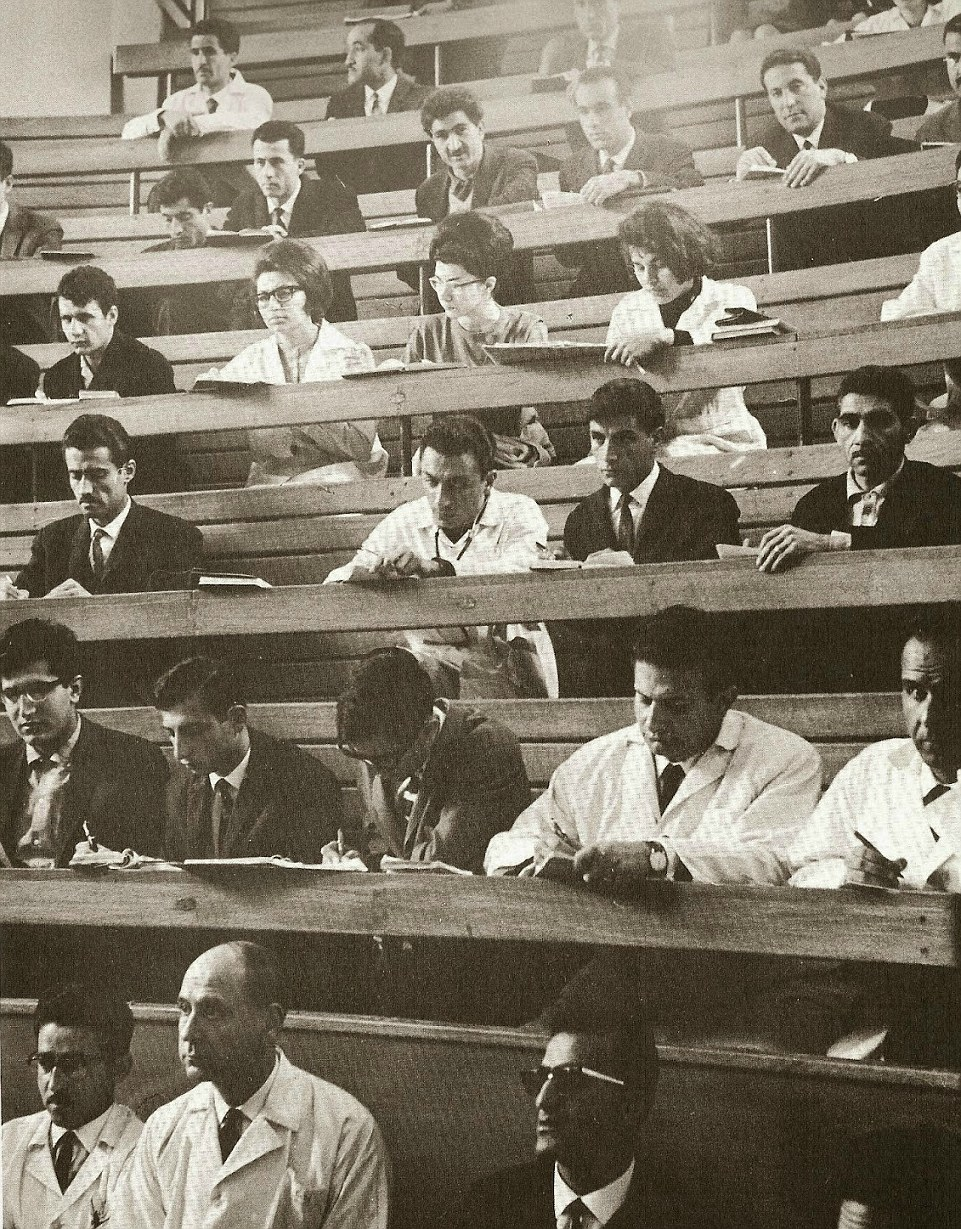
The first university in Iran without sex segregated classes in 1960s.

Reza Shah Pahlavi initiated sweeping modernization policies. In 1928, Reza Shah's regime issued a law known as the Uniform Dress Law. This law required men to wear European-style clothing as part of a broader modernization campaign. The Shah extended these reforms to include “Kashf-e hijab” (meaning unveiling), which resulted in a 1936 decree requiring women to appear in public without traditional veils and in European dress. This policy was introduced at a ceremony known as Women's Emancipation Day. This event became an important aspect of the state's modernization project. A significant number of women from the middle class considered the abolishment of veils as freedom from oppression. However, for others, the veil was not considered oppressive but protection from the eyes of strangers.

Reza Shah attempted to challenge the patriarchal structure of Iran by increasing visibility and mobility of women and to emancipate them from what he viewed as oppressive traditional practices. This included a repudiation of sex-segregation with an order made in 1936 that the Tehran University enroll its first woman.

=== Mohammad Reza Shah era (1941–1979) ===
After Reza Shah’s abdication in 1941 , his son Mohammad Reza Shah Pahlavi initiated reforms that expanded women’s rights, especially during the White Revolution, which he launched in 1963. As part of this modernization campaign, women gained the right to vote and run for office, a significant shift from earlier laws such as the 1925 Electoral Law, which excluded women alongside minors and the criminally insane.

In 1967, the government passed the Family Protection Law (FPL), replacing traditional Sharia-based family codes. It restricted polygamy, required judicial approval for divorce, and allowed women to seek divorce on specific grounds. The 1975 amendment to the FPL raised the minimum marriage age to 18 for women and expanded custody rights and legal protections.

By 1969, women were appointed as judges for the first time, marking a legal turning point, although this was still controversial among conservative religious figures.

During this era, sex segregation policies were relaxed in cities. Co-education expanded, and veiling became optional, especially among the middle class. These changes, however, provoked strong backlash from clerical institutions, which considered the reforms incompatible with Islamic legal theory. This opposition contributed to the Islamic Revolution of 1979, which led to the overthrow of the Shah and resulted in the establishment of a new Islamic government. This new government, the Islamic Republic of Iran, reinstated sex segregation across many areas of public life.

=== After the 1979 Islamic Revolution ===
After the 1979 revolution, sex segregation is introduced into different dimensions of life in Iranian society.

== Gender segregation in public life ==
Gender segregation is a defining feature of public policy in Iran. It is enforced in educational institutions, public spaces, public transportation, parks, and cultural institutions.

Educational institutions are segregated by gender beginning at the primary level. In higher education, women have faced bans from enrolling in specific academic programs. By 2012, over 70 university fields, including engineering and political science, were closed to female applicants at public institutions.

Although these policies are presented as preserving Islamic values, many women resist them in practice. Some challenge dress codes, attend men's sporting events, or assert their right to use public spaces. These acts of resistance reflect the tension between legal restrictions and women's agency in navigating public life.

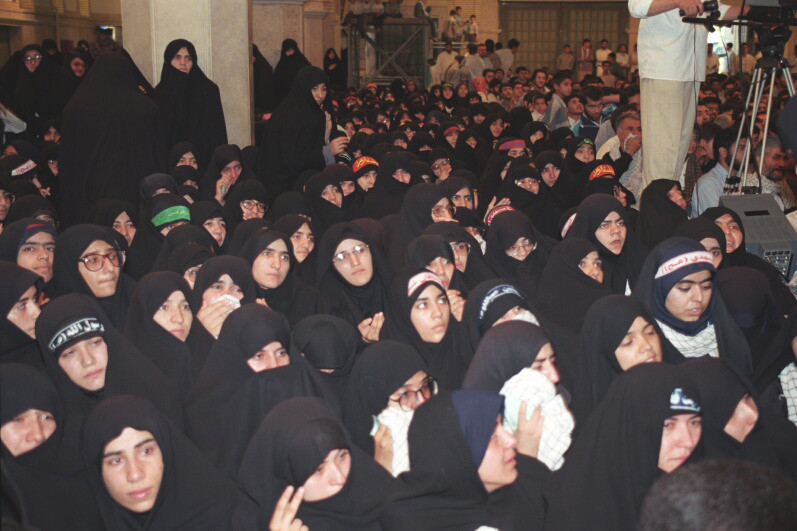
Basiji Students meeting with Ali Khamenei, 1999

When Ruhollah Khomeini called for women to attend public demonstration and ignore the night curfew, millions of women who would otherwise not have dreamt of leaving their homes without their husbands' and fathers' permission or presence, took to the streets. Khomeini's call to rise up against Mohammad Reza Shah took away any doubt in the minds of many devoted Muslim women about the propriety of taking to the streets during the day or at night. After the Iranian revolution, however, Khomeini publicly announced his disapproval of mixing between the sexes.

Khomeini favored single-sex schools in his speech at the anniversary of the birth of Fatimah bint Muhammad, saying:

As the religious leaders have influence and power in this country, they will not permit girls to study in the same school with boys. They will not permit women to teach at boys' schools. They will not permit men to teach at girls' schools. They will not allow corruption in this country.

Sex segregation of public places such as beaches or swimming pools was ordered and legally introduced.

After the Iranian revolution, many guardian groups were in charge for controlling social subjects which were important to the new government like women's clothing and sex segregation of youth. Some of these groups were Islamic Revolution Committees (1979–1991) and Iranian Gendarmerie Jondolla which were converted to newer forms like Guidance Patrol (2005-now) after several years.

Adult males are not permitted to be in contact with females except under the presence of parents. They must intend to marry and until marriage are under parent control.

=== Kindergarten and schools ===
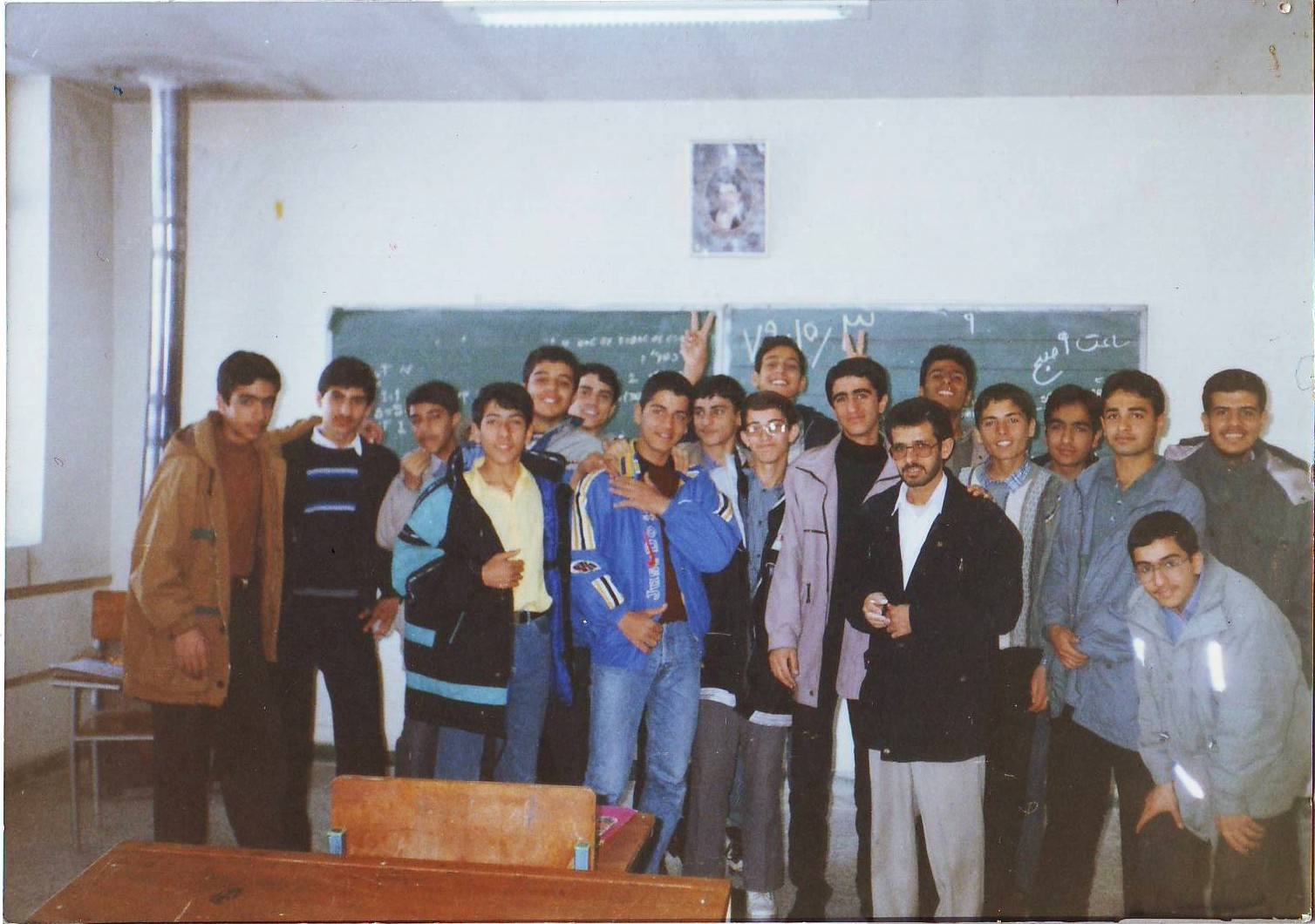
Male high school students in Iran in 2001. All Iranian schools are segregated by sex.

The education system is single-sex so that boys and girls go to different schools. Governmental rules don't allow the mingling of boys and girls in kindergarten.

=== University campus and dormitories ===
Even though most universities are technically co-educational, university students must sit apart from each other by their sexes. All areas in university campuses are segregated by sex; such as restaurants, libraries, study rooms, etc.

Entrance doors of Sharif University of Technology in Tehran are segregated by sex since 2022.

All university dormitories are single-sex with exception of married students dormitories. Single-sex dormitories (for either single or married students) can be male-only or female-only. As an example, Hafez university dormitory is one of the dormitories belonging to male students of University of Tehran while Fatemieh dormitory is one the dormitories belonging to female students of University of Tehran.

=== Urban buses ===
Buses are divided in two parts. Men are required to get on and off through the front door, while the back section and back doors are intended for women. Although bus services in Iran are sex-segregated, women are required to remain fully covered while inside the bus. In other cities such as in Mashhad, males and females were prevented from traveling on the same bus. Traditionally it is not acceptable in Iran for a man to sit or stand beside a non-mahram woman in public places.

In 2021, Tehran municipality announced that it has introduced female-only buses and minibuses inside the city. All the drivers are female and all the passengers should be female, no man is allowed to get on the bus.

=== Metro ===
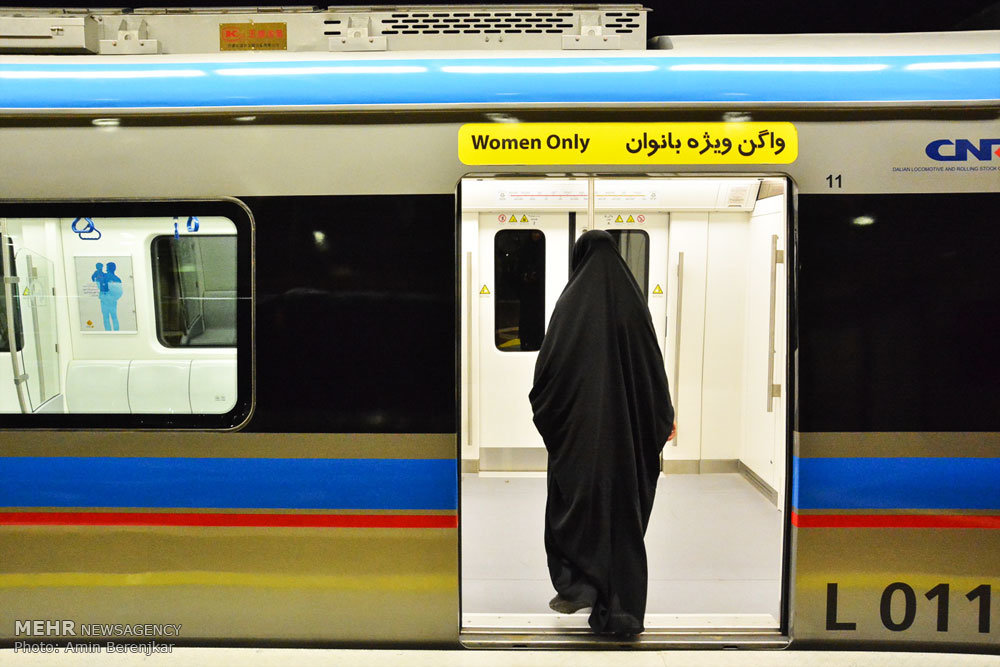
Women-only wagon in the Shiraz Metro

There are special wagons specific to women and, according to Metro laws, entrance of men in these wagons is illegal. Also according to Islamic penal codes, if a woman has an objection against a man, this is considered as female violence and has legal punishment.

=== Beaches ===
In 1979, officials calling the current situation of beaches as "idolatry" started to segregate beaches by sex. By the Caspian coasts, beaches were divided by sex. In the port of Bandare Anzali protesters continued to object for 3 months, but the governor Abolghasem Hosseinjani neglected them and divided the beach by 200 m segments named for men, for women and not suitable for swimming.

=== Bakeries ===
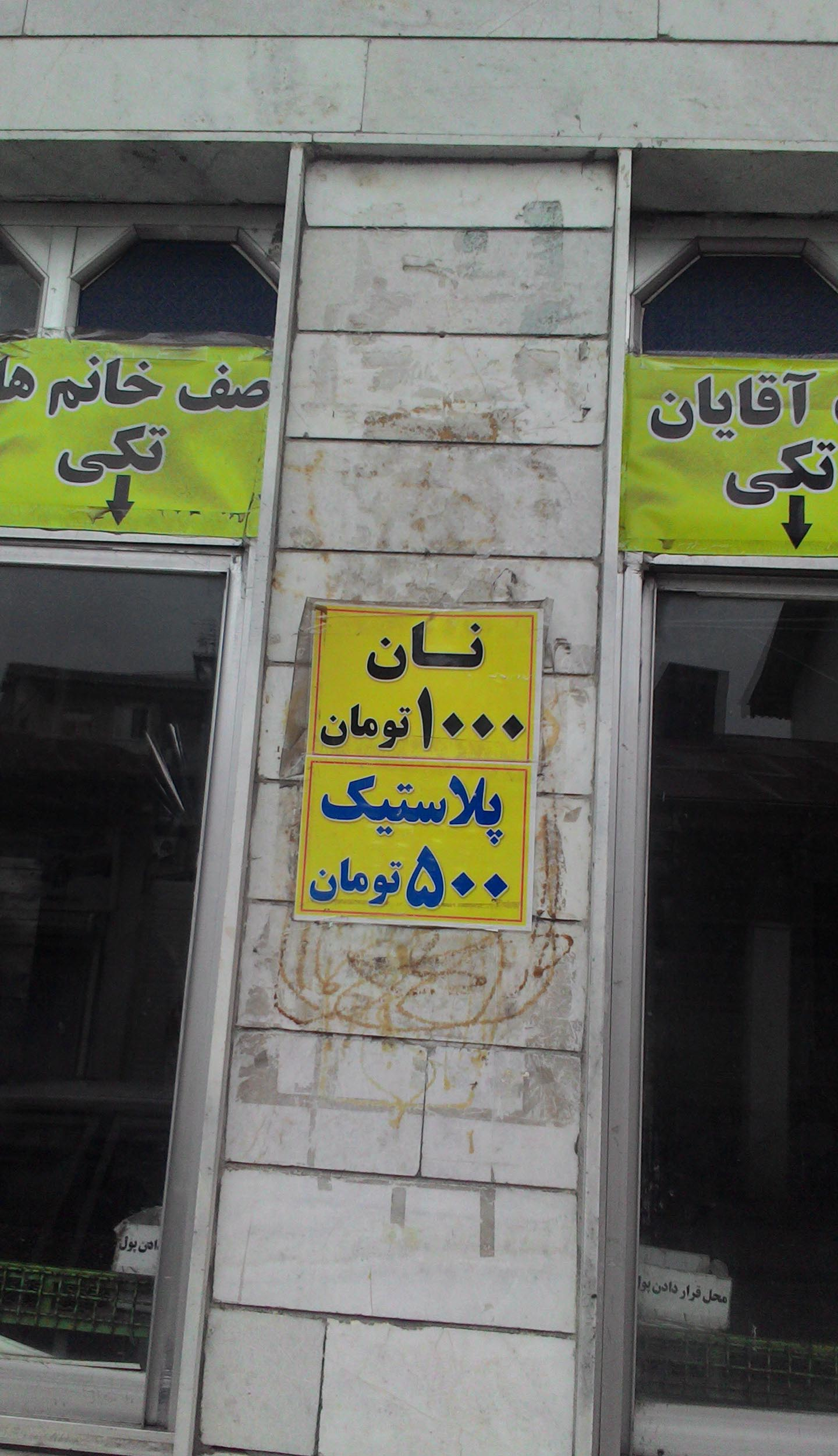
A bakery with two windows to separate male and female customers, Iran, 2020s. In this bakery the right side queue for men and left side queue for women. In Iran; Apart from bakeries, mosques, schools, libraries, music concerts, public transport and many other places are sex segregated.

In bakeries across Iran, men and women must stand in separate lines when buying bread. This is for prevention of touching or looking at Non-mahrams. According to Islamic rules (basis of the constitution) in Iran, looking at Non-mahram women is haram (religiously forbidden) whether they are real or on TV (live-broadcast). Looking at a Non-Mahram is likened to a poisonous bullet shot from Satan in Islamic Sharia.

=== Music concerts ===
Some concerts have been canceled in Iran because of mixed-gender seating during performance. For instance, in August 2014, a concert in Urmia was canceled because men and women were scheduled to attend on the same day. The officials mandated separate attendance days for each gender.

=== Amusement parks ===
In different cities there are amusement parks where men are not allowed to enter. These women-only parks are protected spaces where women can remain out of reach of men.

=== Sport events ===
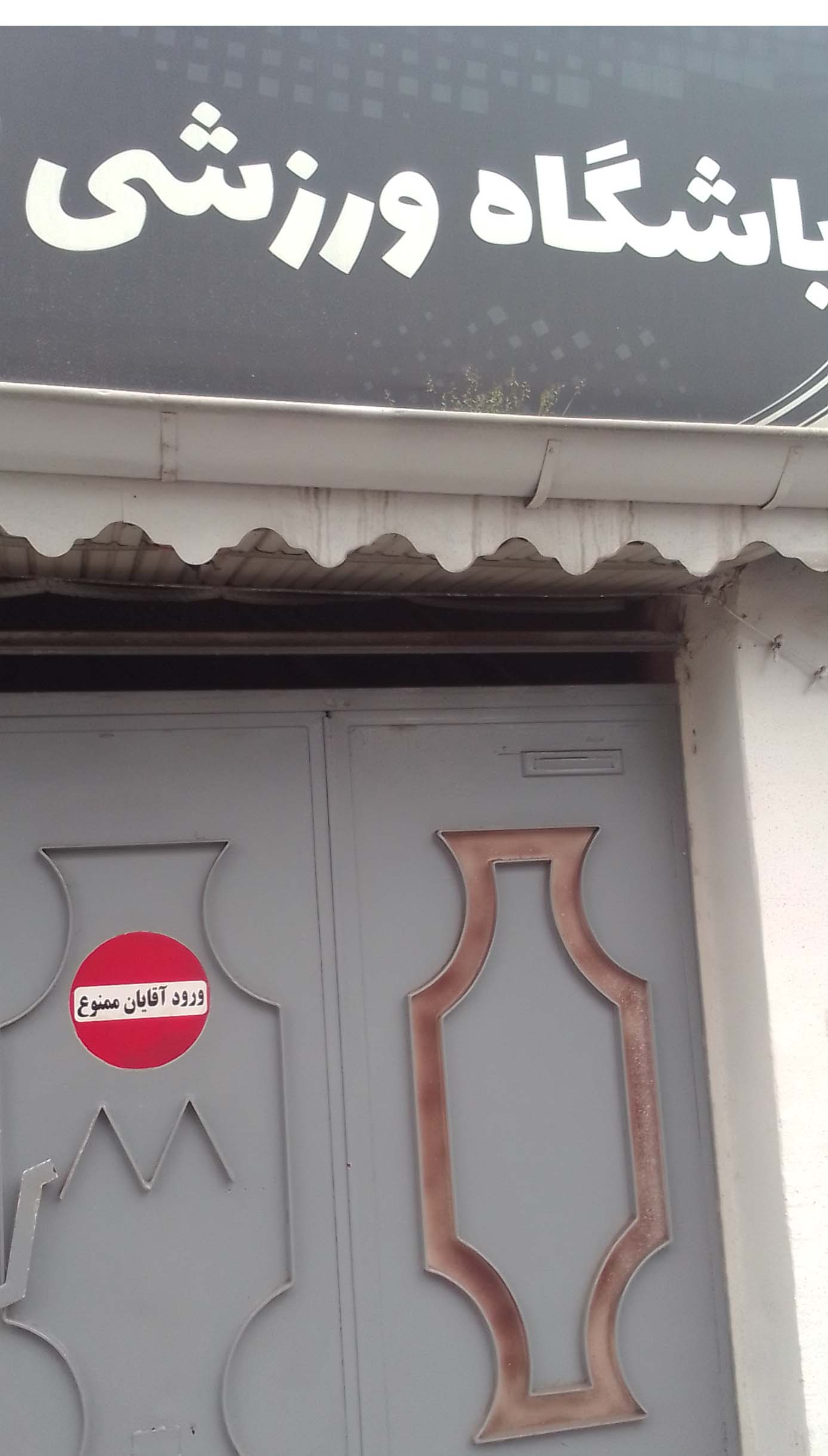
"No entrance for men" sign on a gym in Iran, 2022

Men are not allowed to see women's sport events and vice versa. Hosein Fekri, an official in sports affairs, in early years of Islamic revolution said: "We will create walls in any place women are doing sports in order to prevent men from watching even if it's a tennis yard".

The 2006 movie Offside is about the prohibition of women from the male-played sport of association football.

In 2019, after the death of Sahar Khodayari, Iranian authorities finally allowed select Iranian women to attend a football match in Iran's record 14–0 win against Cambodia for the first time since the Iranian Revolution. However, in March 2022, Iranian women were again banned from attending a World Cup qualifier.

Handshakes between opposite sexes during sport events has resulted in conflicts in Iran. In 2023, an Iranian media objected Hassan Yazdani a famous wrestler for shaking hands with a non-Mahram woman at the game, the scene which was censored by national TV channels.

=== Mosques and religious events ===
Mosques are sex-segregated and have different doors for each sex. As well as, religious committees for Muharram Mourning are sex-segregated.

=== Hospitals ===
Unsuccessful efforts have been made to run sex segregation in hospitals. Some women-only hospitals were constructed but were not successful. Men are prohibited to study in Obstetrics and Gynecology since Masoud Pezeshkian became Minister of Health.

In 2023, the issue was reopened by Gholamabas Torki (in Persian: غلامعباس ترکی) vice attorney-general of the country who said "male physicians don't have to examine female patients."

=== Ski reserves ===
General Hosein Sajedi-nia said police officers will prevent skiers in Tehran ski reserves from immoral behaviours. Police are involved in enhancing sex segregation between male and female skiers.

=== Banks ===
Some women-only banks were constructed in different cities with women employees. In 2010, Bank Melli, a state-owned financial institution in Iran, launched a women-only branch with the stated aim of facilitating financial transactions for women in a gender-exclusive environment. Such state-sponsored initiatives were part of a broader effort to institutionalize gender segregation in public spaces, including the banking sector. After a period, men comprised most of the customers at these banks.

=== Other public places ===
After the 1979 Islamic Revolution, all swimming pools are segregated by sex legally. During early years after the revolution, Komiteh morality police used to prevent wedding ceremonies with gender mingling in outdoor gardens.

Supporters of sex segregation generally claim that experience has shown that presence of women and girls in public places and parks has caused much harassment for them while female-only places result in safety of girls and women and protects them from sexual harassment.

== Police interference and punishing minglers ==
Since the revolution it has been considered a duty of civil police to enforce Sharia law throughout Iran. In 2012, Ahmadi-Moghaddam, current chief police, stated that "sex segregation is not our policy but when a man and woman are dancing in a garden the police interferes because the garden proprietor has plighted not to allow sexes to mingle in a public place". In 2022 images of Sardar Talaie, ex-police chief of Tehran in social media were issued showing him exercising in a mixed gym. A turmoil started among Iranian people when the ex-commander of civil police was responsible for confronting and punishing mingling of sexes doing sports in a mixed gym in Canada.

In 2002, Mojahed Khaziravi was excluded from the Iranian national football team and his club team for several years for attending a mixed party. Upon his arrest, he was set to receive a punishment of 99 lashes and was handed a five-year suspension from playing with the national team, and a three-year suspension from playing with his club, Esteghlal. His suspension was later reduced, and he was not lashed either.

Many cases of police action against sex mingling have been recorded. In 2015, police stopped a bus of tourists heading to the Maranjab Desert. All 32 passengers were arrested for sex mingling.

In 2012, Sharia police arrested a group including 45 boys and girls going mountain climbing in the suburb of Mashhad. In 2016, police arrested 25 men and women with the average age of 25-35 who didn't have any familiar relationship and were together in a garden villa in Pardis County (around Tehran). The prosecutor convicted them of premarital sex and ordered to punish them.

== Objections ==
Some consider sex segregation a positive thing. For example, ex-parliament representative Seyyed Mahmood Hoseini Dolatabadi said, "University is a place for education not for finding a partner. University is supposed to be a place for catharsis and learning. We have such successful places for this aim like Islamic Hawzas. Furthermore sex-segregated universities are successful."

On the other hand, some authorities and sociologists in Iran are against sex segregation. Saeed Moeedfar, an Iranian sociologist, said in an interview with Fararu press: "Sex segregation policy forms negative reaction in the society. The attitudes of previous policy makers have caused abnormalities in our society and people no longer pay attention to moral and ethical norms which were obeyed before sex segregation."

Ali Jannati, ex-minister of culture, said in 2014: "We don't enforce sex-segregation of live concerts. The governmental cultural group doesn't agree with this idea and won't enforce it because we consider it inappropriate for families."

During Mahsa Amini protests in 2022, in some universities like University of Tehran and Allameh Tabataba'i University, male and female students chose to eat in the same place while mingling with each other as a demonstration of civil disobedience.

== See also ==
- Transgender rights in Iran
- Women's rights in Iran
- Sex segregation and Islam
- Homosexuality in Iran
