= Roger Jones (poet) =

American poet

Roger Jones (born 1954) is an American poet.

== Life ==
Roger Jones received his B.A. and M.A. at Sam Houston State University, before earning his Ph.D. from Oklahoma State University in 1986. He has had a wide publication record over the past thirty years that includes poetry in traditional western forms as well as haiku, tanka and haibun. Jones currently teaches at Texas State University in San Marcos, Texas, for the Texas State University MFA. He lives in San Marcos, Texas with his wife and two children.

== Awards ==
- Texas Review Poetry Chapbook Prize, 1980
- Academy of American Poets Prize, 1984
- Texas Review Southern/Southwestern Breakthrough competition award, 1993
- Texas Review Press Poetry Prize, 2008

== Works ==
- Remembering New London (Texas Review Press, 1981)
- Strata (Texas Review Press, 1993)
- Are We There Yet? (Texas Review Press, 2006)
