= David Ray (poet) =

American poet (1932–2024)

David Ray (May 20, 1932 – August 8, 2024) was an American poet and author of fiction, essays, and memoir. He was particularly noted for poems that, while being rooted in the personal, also show a strong social concern.

Ray was the author of twenty-two volumes of poetry, including "Hemingway: A Desperate Life" (2011), "When" (2007), "Music of Time: Selected and New Poems" (2006) and The Death of Sardanapalus and Other Poems of the Iraq Wars (2004). "After Tagore: Poems Inspired by Rabindranath Tagore" was published in India in 2008.

Ray taught at several colleges in the United States, including Cornell University, Reed College, the University of Iowa Writers' Workshop, and the University of Missouri-Kansas City, where he was professor emeritus. He also taught in India, New Zealand, and Australia, and published books inspired by the cultures of each country.

Among other prizes, including an N.E.A. fellowship for fiction and five P.E.N. Newspaper Syndicate Awards for short stories, David Ray was a two-time winner of the William Carlos Williams Award from the Poetry Society of America. Ray died on August 8, 2024, at the age of 92.

== Biography ==
Ray was born in Sapulpa, Oklahoma in 1932. The family lived on "Grampa Ray's" share-cropped farm until David's father became a barber and they moved to small towns. Ray came from a broken home that was thrown into upheaval when his father left the family by hopping on the back of a watermelon truck headed to California. After his mother's next failed marriage ended in the suicide of Ray's stepfather, he and his sister Mary Ellen were placed into foster care—a system that wasn't kind to young children in the late 1930s and early 1940s. Ray's classic "Mulberries of Mingo" steeps from memories of he and his sister being thrown out of a foster families home at dinner time—to fend for themselves eating the mulberries from a neighbor's tree. The years that followed were dark and tragic as he and his sister were separated to face their separate nightmares of abuse.

First in Kansas City and then in Tucson, David became a member of the Society of Friends (Quakers).

He is a distinguished award winner, and has lectured at over 100 Universities in England, Canada, and the US. He received a B.A. and M.A. from the University of Chicago. During the 1960s he co-founded, with Robert Bly, American Writers Against the Vietnam War.

Ray's poetry varies from short, three to four lines pieces, to longer 30 lines poems. His work is also often autobiographical, providing unique context and insight to scenes of childhood, love, fear, sex, and travel. "Communication is important to him, and he has the courage, working with a genre in which simplicity is suspect, to say plainly what he means."

Some of his awards include the Nuclear Age Peace Foundation Poetry Prize (2001), the Allen Ginsberg Poetry Award (1997), the Maurice English Poetry Award (1988) for Sams Book, and he has been a two-time winner of the William Carlos Williams prize from the Poetry Society of America (1979, 1994) for "The Tramp's Cup" and Wool Highways. Ray's poetry is individual yet strongly social, allowing him freedom to relate to a wide demographic. With Robert Bly, David co-founded American Writers Against the Vietnam War in 1966 and they co-edited A POETRY READING AGAINST THE VIETNAM WAR, a collection of relevant readings from the classics as well as contemporary sources.

He is the founding editor of New Letters Magazine and New Letters on the Air. His work has appeared in Harper's, The Paris Review, The New Yorker, The Iowa Review, and many others. He has also held faculty positions at Cornell, University of Missouri-Kansas City, University of Iowa, and Reed, as well as visiting positions at Syracuse, and universities in India, Australia, and New Zealand.

The David Ray Poetry Award: Named in his honor, this award was sponsored by the now defunct journal Potpourri; A Magazine of the Literary Arts. Recipients have included poets Lee Price, Carol Hamilton, and David Beard.

== Selected bibliography ==
- X-Rays (1965)
- "Dragging the Main" (1968)
- Gathering Firewood: New Poems and Selected (1974)
- Elysium in the Halls of Hell (1989)
- Kangaroo Paws: Poems Written in Australia (1994)
- The Endless Search: A Memoir (2003)
- The Death of Sardanapalus and Other Poems of the Iraq Wars (2004)
- One Thousand Years: Poems about the Holocaust. Timberline Press, 2004
- Demons in the Diner. Ashland Poetry Press, 1998.
- Wool Highways. Helicon Nine Editions, 1993.
- Not Far From the River. Copper Canyon Press, 1990.
- The Maharani's New Wall. Wesleyan Univ. Press, 1989.
- Sam's Book. Wesleyan Univ. Press, 1987.
- The Touched Life. Scarecrow Press, 1989.
- The Tramp's Cup. Chariton Review Press, 1978.
- "Music of Time: Selected and New Poems". Backwaters Press, 2006.
- "When". (Howling Dog Press/Omega Editions, 2007)
- "After Tagore: Poems Inspired by Rabindranath Tagore". (Nirala Editions, 2008)
- "Hemingway: A Desperate Life" (Whirlybird Press, 2011)

== Reviews ==
-Seanna Oakley (Ph.D. English, University of Wisconsin-Madison), on The Endless Search: A Memoir: "How can the quiet ache of poet David Ray's memoir, The Endless Search, compete in a market voracious for what reviewer Chris Leman calls the 'extreme-memoir' genre of current best-selling memoirs in the United States?... Ray's search for reconciliation with a childhood of abuse and neglect assumes a modesty that runs counter to expectations shaped by contemporary memoir bestsellers. From disclosures of sexual abuse to 'peeping tom' voyeurism, Ray recounts shameful episodes from the past no less candidly than other memoirists. Yet the restraint that governs his evaluation of the multitude of parents and their proxies, relatives, guardians, and orphanage officials whose collective actions unambiguously disavow his value as a human being is striking enough to capture readers disenchanted by the prolix confessionals of the last two decades...."

-F.D. Reeve (Professor of Russian, Wesleyan University), on The Death of Sardanapalus): "There is nothing like this book in American poetry today, for it is the skilled work of a craftsman whose fine ear and deft control distinguish every poem, all of which cry out against the barbarism of war and the stupid cruelties of those who make it. From the clever metaphoric transition of "The Tomb of the Unknown Soldier" to the deeply moving elegy to Wilfred Owen, this collection of intense lyrics shines with intelligence and passion."

-Anslem Hollo (Professor of writing and poetics, Naropa University), on The Death of Sardanapalus: "In a time of imperial wars abroad and religious wars at home, David Ray's eloquent meditations speak to all who hope and work for change."

-Philip Schultz (Director of writers studio in NYC), on The Death of Sardanapalus: "Zbigniew Herbert uses irony to mask his great vulnerability in the face of oppression. David Ray uses a detached classicism to distance himself (and us) from the present horror. But the outrage is there, and the great sadness. I admire these poems, and his courage in writing them."

-Kirkus Review, on The Endless Search: A Memoir: "Two-time winner of the William Carlos Williams Award from the Poetry Society of America, Ray (English Emeritus/Univ. of Missouri) is one of only a handful of poets to garner a following among nonacademics. While selections of his poetry, eloquent and intensely personal, are scattered throughout the present volume, the topic at hand concerns a boy ever in search of his missing father, or a surrogate. After growing up in Oklahoma during the Depression, son of a dirt-poor sharecropper and an obsessive mother who hated dirt in all its forms, Ray was shuffled among relatives and foster homes, later spending time on an Arizona ranch. He became self-supporting as a teenager and won a scholarship to the University of Chicago. A stint in that city as a social worker gave him insights into his own childhood and the generations of American men who grew up without a male role model. Ray describes the string of "uncles" with whom his mother sought security and a proper home life, as well as the wealthy guardian who both tormented and sexually abused him during a childhood comprising parts of Great Expectations and Oliver Twist. The author's frank account, unlike many in the current canon of victimology, is almost lyrical, while remaining unglamorized and unsentimental throughout. Ray's quest is alternately heartbreaking and chilling, yet he never lapses into narcissism or self-pity. He goes astray only when drawing broader conclusions, suggesting, for instance, that it is homophobia that drives the pedophile and the sadist. The personal conclusions Ray draws, however, and the triumph of spirit his life demonstrates are much more important. A riveting and well-written narrative of abuse."

== See also ==
- List of poetry awards
