= Safiya Henderson-Holmes =

American poet

- Born: Sharon E. Henderson; December 30, 1950; The Bronx, New York City, U.S.
- Died: April 8, 2001 (aged 50)
- Education: New York University (BA); City College of New York (MFA)
- Occupations: Poet, university faculty member
- Spouse: Preston Holmes
- Children: 1
- Awards: William Carlos Williams Award, MacDowell Fellowship, Northstar Grant, New York CAPS Poetry Fellowship, Goodman City College Award

Sharon "Safiya" Henderson-Holmes (December 30, 1950 – April 8, 2001) was an American poet from New York. She published two collections of poetry, had her work included in multiple anthologies, and received the William Carlos Williams Award from the Poetry Society of America. She was an assistant professor at Syracuse University at the time of her death.

== Early life and education ==
Sharon "Safiya" E. Henderson (later Henderson-Holmes) was born December 30, 1950, in the Bronx, New York City.

She completed a BA from New York University, followed by a Master of Fine Arts with a concentration in creative writing from City College. Henderson-Holmes later pursued post-graduate studies at Columbia University's Teacher College.

== Career ==
For some time, she worked as a physical therapist at Harlem Hospital, and also assisted pregnant women with a natural birthing practice. Henderson-Holmes later held a number of teaching posts, including positions at Marymount College, Touro College, Eugene Lang College, the College of New Rochelle, and Sarah Lawrence College. She became poet-in-residence at the University Heights High School, and was appointed assistant professor at Syracuse University from 1990 until her death in 2001.

Henderson-Holmes was actively involved in initiatives such as Poets and Writers, Art Against Apartheid, and the National Council of American-Soviet Friendship.

Between 1982 and 1992, she received two Goodman City College Awards and a MacDowell Fellowship. In 1983, she was recipient of a Northstar Grant and a New York CAPS Poetry Fellowship. In 1990, Henderson-Holmes received the William Carlos Williams Award for her first collection of poems, titled Madness and a Bit of Hope. The collection, like much of Henderson-Holmes' work, focused on exploring "the political realities in the lives of women". She published her second book of poetry in 1994, called Daily Bread.

In 1999, Henderson-Holmes received a fellowship from the New York Foundation of the Arts, but this award was followed soon after by a diagnosis of cancer. She developed a series of poetic narratives about her diagnosis and subsequent treatment, calling this poetic cycle "C-ing Colors". Henderson-Holmes said that cancer made her feel "diminished", and that "in order to outlive this disease, I needed more of me—not less—more weight, more desire", which prompted her to write more poetry.

Henderson-Holmes died on April 8, 2001, aged 50.

== Reception ==
Despite attracting few critical analyses, Henderson-Holmes was popular in the New York poetry community, and her work has been published in multiple anthologies and editions. One critic from the Amsterdam News described Henderson-Holmes as "positive, fiery, revolutionary", commenting that her "eloquent, yet stinging, poignant poetic words pierce souls". Writer and poet June Jordan wrote that Henderson-Holmes gave readers "spine and joy and the grace of laughter – with a surety of craft that cannot fail".

== Personal life ==
Henderson-Holmes married film producer Preston Holmes, and the couple had one daughter named Naimah.
