= Kathleen Peirce =

American poet (born 1956)

Kathleen Peirce (born 1956, Moline, Illinois, United States) is an American poet. She graduated from the Iowa Writer's Workshop in 1988. She currently teaches at Texas State University in San Marcos, Texas, for the Texas State University MFA. She lives in Wimberley, TX and has one son.

== Awards ==
- 1990 Association of Writers & Writing Programs Award for Mercy
- 1993 Whiting Award
- 1998 Iowa Poetry Prize for The Oval Hour
- 2000 William Carlos Williams Award for The Oval Hour
- 2005 National Endowment for the Arts Fellowship
- 2007 Guggenheim Fellowship

== Works ==
- "Anima Forma Corporis"; "Confession 3.10.18"; "Apart", Reading Between A&B
- "Measure", Blackbird
- "Redbird", Nothing to Say and Saying It
- "Anima Forma Corporis", courtland Review

=== Bibliography ===
- Mercy, Pittsburgh, University of Pittsburgh Press, 1991, ISBN 978-0-8229-5457-6
- Divided Touch, Divided Color, Windhover, 1995
- The Oval Hour University of Iowa Press, 1999, ISBN 9780877456643
- The Ardors, Ausable Press, 2004, ISBN 978-1-931337-19-9
- Vault: A Poem New Michigan Press, 2017, ISBN 9781934832615
- Lion's Paw Miami University Press, 2021, ISBN 9781881163688
