= Khadijah Queen =

American poet

- Born: 1975 (age 50–51); Wayne, Michigan, U.S.
- Education: Antioch University (MFA); University of Denver (PhD)
- Occupation: Poet
- Notable work: Anodyne; I'm So Fine: A List of Famous Men & What I Had On
- Awards: William Carlos Williams Award (2021)

Khadijah Queen (born 1975) is an American poet. She is the author of several poetry collections, including Anodyne (2020), which won the William Carlos Williams Award, I'm So Fine: A List of Famous Men & What I Had On (2017), and the memoir Between the Devil and the Deep Blue Sea (2025).

== Early life and education ==
Queen was born in Wayne, Michigan, in 1975, and grew up primarily in Los Angeles, California. In a 2025 interview with The Offing, she said that her mother's family had migrated to Michigan from Alabama in the 1920s after her great-grandfather was lynched.

A Kirkus Reviews review of her memoir Between the Devil and the Deep Blue Sea states that her family later moved back from LA to Michigan; soon after, Queen joined the U.S. Navy in 1998 at age 22. She later earned a PhD in English and Literary Arts from the University of Denver.

== Career ==
Queen is the author of the full-length poetry collections Conduit (2008), Black Peculiar (2011), Fearful Beloved (2015), I'm So Fine: A List of Famous Men & What I Had On (2017), and Anodyne (2020). Her 2015 book Non-Sequitur is a verse play; it won the Leslie Scalapino Award for Innovative Women's Performance Writing in 2014 and was later produced in New York City in 2015.

In The New Yorker, Hanif Abdurraqib called I'm So Fine "an investigation of celebrity culture and toxic masculinity that moves at a lyrical sprint".

Fearful Beloved was reviewed in Kenyon Review by Abby Minor, who discussed its themes of violence, healing, and survival.

In 2021, Anodyne won the William Carlos Williams Award from the Poetry Society of America. In a review for Harvard Review, Hanna Andrews called the collection "riveting" and described it as concerned with "apocalypse and beauty; suffering and persistence; love and its attendant exhaustion".

In 2025, Queen received the Cy Twombly Award for Poetry from the Foundation for Contemporary Arts.

Her memoir Between the Devil and the Deep Blue Sea was published by Legacy Lit in 2025. Asked in a 2026 interview with WKAR how her experiences shaped her as a writer, including a Navy boot-camp episode described in the memoir in which she lost her security clearance, Queen connected such experiences to her commitment to speaking openly and telling “authentic stories.”

== Bibliography ==
=== Poetry ===
- Conduit (2008, Akashic Books)
- Black Peculiar (2011, Noemi Press)
- Fearful Beloved (2015, Argos Books)
- I'm So Fine: A List of Famous Men & What I Had On (2017, YesYes Books)
- Anodyne (2020, Tin House)

=== Plays ===
- Non-Sequitur (2015, Litmus Press)

=== Memoir ===
- Between the Devil and the Deep Blue Sea (2025, Legacy Lit)
