= Regina Guimarães =

Regina Guimarães (born 1957, in Porto), also known as Corbe, is a Portuguese poet, playwright, stage director and lyricist. She lives and works with her partner, Sergei Saguenail Abramovici a.k.a. Saguenail, since 1975. The couple founded the publishing house Hélastre.

Regina Guimarães is a member of the band Três Tristes Tigres, writing all music lyrics. Her poetry has also been sung by the band Clã.

Guimarães' first book came out in 1979, and, despite an irregular publishing pace, she is revered as one of the most important living artists in Porto.

== Works ==
=== Poetry ===
- 1979 – A Repetição (ed. Hélastre)
- 1980 – Abaixo da Banalidade, Abastança (ed. Hélastre)
- 1985 – Anelar, Mínimo (ed. &etc.)
- 1990 – O Extra-Celeste (ed. AEFLUP)
- 1990 – Múmia (ed. Hélastre)
- 1992 – Uma Árvore como se Fosse Uma Rainha (ed. author, Afrontamento)
- 1994 – Tutta (ed. Felício & Cabral)
- 2001 – Algum(ns) Texto(s) Avesso(s) à Ideia de Obra (in the anthology Vozes e Olhares no Feminino)
- 2002 – 9 Histórias a 4 Mãos e 7 Pés (ed. Campo Alegre)
- 2009 – Orbe (ed. Hélastre)
- 2009 – Lady Boom: As Raínhas/ Cantigas de Amigo (ed. Hélastre)
- 2010 – Caderno do Regresso (ed. Hélastre)
