= Alan Gilbert =

Alan Gilbert may refer to:

- Alan Gilbert (conductor) (born 1967), American conductor and violinist
- Alan Gilbert (Australian academic) (1944–2010), Australian historian and academic administrator
- Alan Gilbert (American academic), American professor
- Charles Allan Gilbert (1873–1929), American illustrator
