= Golden Needle Sewing School =

- Herat; Afghanistan

Information
- School type: Girls' School
- Established: c.1996
- Affiliation: Herat Literary Circle

The Golden Needle Sewing School was an underground school for women in Herat, Afghanistan, during the First Islamic Emirate of Afghanistan. Because women above the age of eight were not allowed to be educated under the strict interpretation of Islamic law introduced by the Taliban, women writers belonging to the Herat Literary Circle set up a group called the Sewing Circles of Herat, which founded the Golden Needle Sewing School in or around 1996.

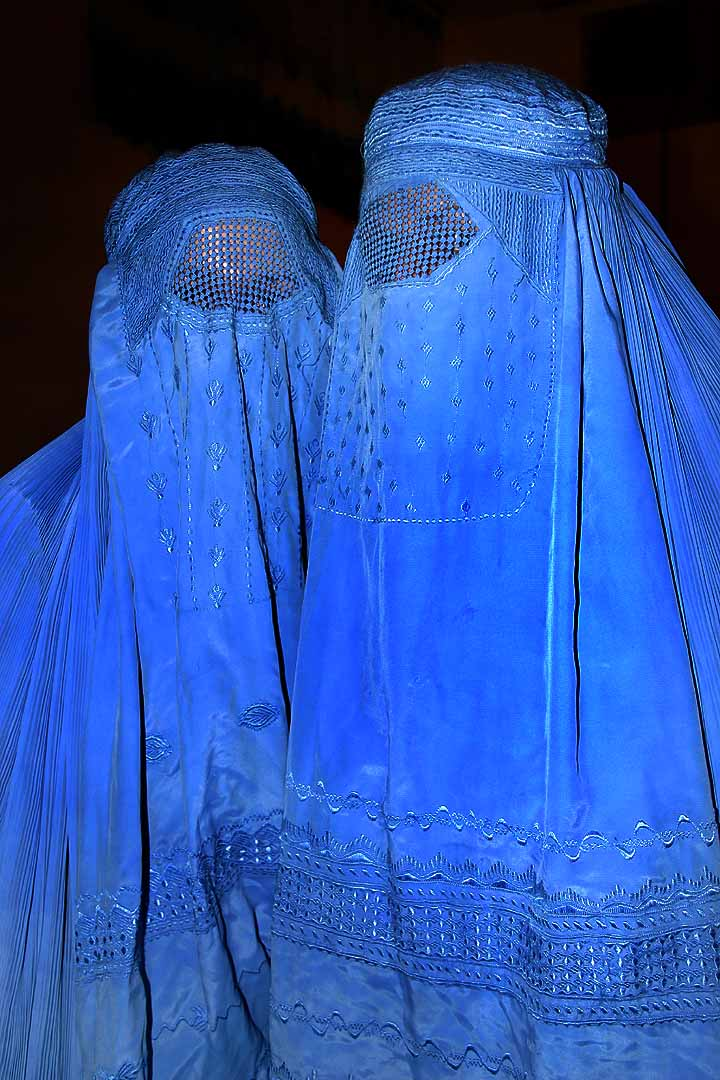
Women wearing the burqa in northern Afghanistan

Women would visit the school three times a week, ostensibly to sew, but would instead hear lectures given by professors of literature from Herat University. Children playing outside would alert the group if the religious police approached, giving them time to hide their books and pick up sewing equipment. Herat may have been the most oppressed area under the Taliban, according to Christina Lamb, author of The Sewing Circles of Herat, because it was a cultured city and mostly Shi'a, both of which the Taliban opposed. She told Radio Free Europe:

They would arrive in their burqas with their bags full of material and scissors. Underneath they would have notebooks and pens. And once they got inside, instead of learning to sew, they would actually be talking about Shakespeare and James Joyce, Dostoyevsky and their own writing. It was a tremendous risk they were taking. If they had been caught, they would have been, at the very least, imprisoned and tortured. Maybe hanged.

== See also ==
- Afghanistan
- The Guernsey Literary and Potato Peel Pie Society
- Islamic feminism
- Revolutionary Association of the Women of Afghanistan
- Sewing circle
- Sharia
- Treatment of women by the Taliban
- Women in Islam
