= Women-only park =

Sex-segregated park; prominent in Islamic cities

Women parks are women-only amusement parks. These are sites prominent in Islamic cities. These parks well show that there is sex segregation in a society because men and boys are not allowed to enter. This is usually written on a sign in the entrance or there is a guardian who prevents males from entering the park.

== History ==
The first women park was established in Helena, Montana in 1913, the first one in Iran was established in Borujerd in 2000s.

== By country ==
=== Iran ===
In different cities there are amusement parks where men are not allowed to enter with the aim of sex segregation. Masoumeh Ebtekar has said that establishing these parks is a national essential. These parks are in many big and small cities in the country, such as:

- Tehran (5 women parks; namely, Behesht-e-madran, Pardis-e-Banovan, Boostan-e-Narges, Shahrbanoo Complex, Reyhane park)
- Shiraz
- Esfahan
- Mashhad
- Tabriz
- Nowshahr
- Bandar Abbas
- Rasht
- Kerman
- Marand

Founded in 2008, Behesht-e-madran is the first women-only park of Tehran. Shahrbanoo Complex (also called Velayat) is another women-only park in Tehran. It includes recreation and sport facilities just for females. Reyhane park is in fact part of Chitgar Park separated only for women including 18 ha.

=== Pakistan ===
In 2012 a women's park called Fatima Jinnah was established in Lahore with walls 7 feet in height. Authorities have promised to establish 10 more others.

=== Saudi Arabia ===
The first female-only trampoline park was established by Bounce in the capital of Saudi Arabia, in 2018.

=== India ===
The Delhi Municipal Corporation announced that it will create 250 of its own 'Pink Parks' Such a Pink Park was already built in Chandni Mahal.

== Dubai ==
In September 2020, Loopagoon, the world's first water park just for women, launched in Dana Bay, Saudi Arabia. This park is a partnership between Prologic First Dubai and Gateway Ticketing Systems' Galaxy Ticketing and Guest Experience solution. It's also the first major water park in the Eastern Province of Saudi Arabia.
