= Women-only space =

Exclusive area for women

A women-only space is an area where only women (and in some cases children) are allowed, thus providing a place where they do not have to interact with men. Historically and globally, many cultures had, and many still have, some form of female seclusion. These spaces refer to physical or digital environments created to serve the social, cultural, educational, health, and safety needs of women.

== History of women-only spaces ==
The emergence of first wave feminism in the 19th and early 20th centuries, especially the struggle for women's suffrage (the right to vote) and access to education and professions in English-speaking societies, led to the creation of various women-only spaces intended to support their autonomy, safety, and social participation.

One of the earliest examples was the "Ladies' ordinary" a women-only dining space that began appearing in North American hotels and restaurants around the 1830s. At a time when it was considered socially improper for women to dine alone or without a male escort, these separate dining rooms provided women with greater freedom of movement in public settings.

In 1903, British activists Emmeline Pankhurst and her daughter Christabel Pankhurst founded the Women's Social and Political Union (WSPU), a militant organization focused on securing voting rights for women. Membership in the WSPU was exclusively open to women, reflecting the founders' belief in autonomous political organization free from male influence. Women involved in this movement were called suffragettes, as opposed to the law-abiding suffragists of the National Union of Women's Suffrage Societies, membership of which was open to men as well.

By the 1910s and 1920s, women-only lounges and rest rooms became more common in the United States, particularly in rural areas. These spaces were designed to accommodate women traveling into towns to shop or conduct business and often included areas to rest, nurse children, or socialize. The Ladies Rest Room in Lewisburg, Tennessee, is believed to be one of the last remaining free-standing examples in the state still in use.

In 1929, Virginia Woolf published the influential essay A Room of One's Own, in which she argued that women needed literal and figurative private space along with financial independence to write and express themselves freely. Her work became foundational in feminist thought and offered a powerful justification for the creation of women-only spaces in intellectual and artistic spheres.

In Ghana, women-led markets were historically governed by market queens, who played key roles in local governance and commerce. Notably, Agnes Oforiwa Tagoe-Quarcoopome, a market queen in Accra, mobilized women to support Ghana's independence movement by organizing the Makola Women Association.

Among the Igbo people of Nigeria, the Umuada, a collective of women born into a particular lineage, functioned as a powerful institution. These women returned to their paternal homes to resolve communal disputes, advocate for justice, and lead ceremonial and social activities.

In Sierra Leone and Liberia, the Sande society is a women's initiation institution that provides girls with rites of passage into adulthood. These women-only spaces serve as centers for spiritual education, leadership training, and the transmission of cultural values. The society promotes women's solidarity and counters male-dominated structures such as the Poro society.

In South Africa, several women-only organizations emerged during the Apartheid era. The Black Sash, founded in 1955 by white women, operated as a resistance organization advocating for civil rights through silent vigils and legal aid. The Federation of South African Women (FEDSAW), established in 1954, brought together women across racial lines to challenge pass laws and demand sexual equality.

== Purpose and background ==
Women-only spaces are a form of sex segregation, often designed to provide physical safety, social support, or opportunities for empowerment. These spaces may include women-only public toilets, passenger cars on public transport or women's parking spaces, gyms, educational institutions, or cultural associations. They are sometimes referred to as "safe spaces", particularly when created to shield women from harassment, discrimination, or sex-based violence.

Historically, women-only spaces have emerged in response to unequal access to public and private domains. In western contexts, feminist movements of the 19th and 20th centuries advocated for the establishment of areas where women could gather, educate, and organize autonomously.

In African societies, women-only associations have deep cultural roots. Examples include Ghana's market queen networks, Nigeria's Umuada Kinship group, and Liberia and Sierra Leone's Sande society: a female initiation and leadership organization. These institutions have historically functioned as centers of communal decision-making, spiritual teaching, and female solidarity.

Women-only spaces also exist in professional, academic, and religious contexts. In some regions, women-only mosques, prayer rooms, or religious schools are designed to ensure spiritual participation within sex segregated faith systems. Similarly, women's colleges, for example Seven Sisters (colleges), have career workshops and STEM-focused mentorship programs that provide support in male-dominated environments.

These spaces do not go without challenge. While many view such spaces as empowering and necessary, others have critiqued them for reinforcing binary gender norms or excluding trans and non-binary individuals, example: men's rights activists have launched lawsuits to gain access to female-only spaces, for example Stopps v Just Ladies Fitness (Metrotown) Ltd, regarding a gym in Canada. Trans women's access to these spaces, regardless of their legal gender, is also sometimes contentious, both from an ethical and a legal perspective. In some cases, questions have been raised about the value and legitimacy of particular spaces being reserved for women.

== Examples of women-only spaces ==
=== Businesses and services ===
Women-only banks, such as the Kenya Women Microfinance Bank, support female entrepreneur by providing access to financial services. The Women's Building in San Francisco is a community center for women, offering legal aid, healthcare services, and leadership training.

=== Transportation ===
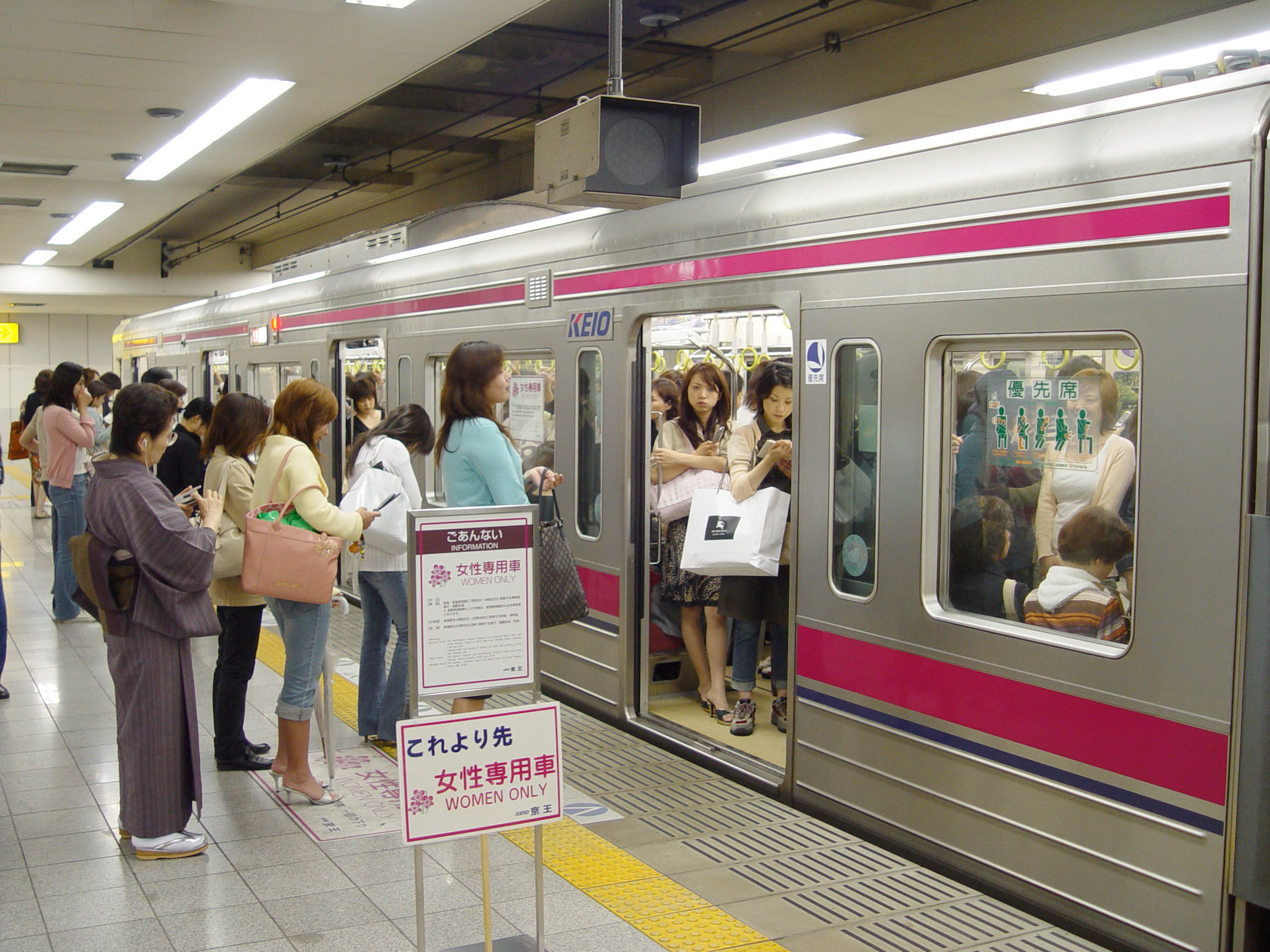
Women boarding a seclusive train car

To promote women's safety in urban areas, pink rickshaw services have been introduced in countries like South Africa, as well as Egypt.

=== Clubs and digital platforms ===
The National Association of Colored Women's Clubs (NACWC) in the United States founded in 1896, remains a prominent example. In Africa, organizations like African women in business in Ethiopia offer platforms for female entrepreneurs. Platforms such as She Leads Africa create virtual women-centered communities for career and business advancement.

=== Celebrations and cultural events ===
Celebrations include International Women's Day. Movements like Take Back the Night, which originated in the West, advocate for women's safety. Afro-feminist events include the Nyansapo Festival in Paris.

=== Education ===
Girls' schools and women's colleges have played important roles in education. Examples include: Girls' schools in Sierra Leone and Spelman College in the United States, a historically Women's colleges in the Southern United States. In conflict-affected areas such as Afghanistan and northern Nigeria, informal underground schools for girls have emerged to continue education under restrictive conditions.

=== Land and shelter ===
Women's shelters provide safe spaces for women fleeing violence. Rosie's Place in Boston, US founded in 1974, is a women-only shelter. In Kenya, Umoja Village was established as a refuge for women escaping domestic abuse and early forced marriages. Other examples include Nkosi's Haven in South Africa, caring for mothers and children affected by HIV/AIDS.

=== Health care ===
Feminist health center such as those initiated by the Boston Women's Health Book Collective, pioneered women's healthcare activism during the Second-wave feminism. Fistula Foundation operate clinics focusing on maternal health. Native American Women's Health Education Resource Center offer culturally specific services.

=== Religion ===
In Nigeria and parts of North Africa, Women's mosques provide separate worship spaces.

=== Sports ===
The African Women Cup of Nations is the premier women's football tournament in Africa, while in North America, the Women's National Basketball Association (WNBA) showcase professional women's sports.

=== Toilets and changing rooms ===
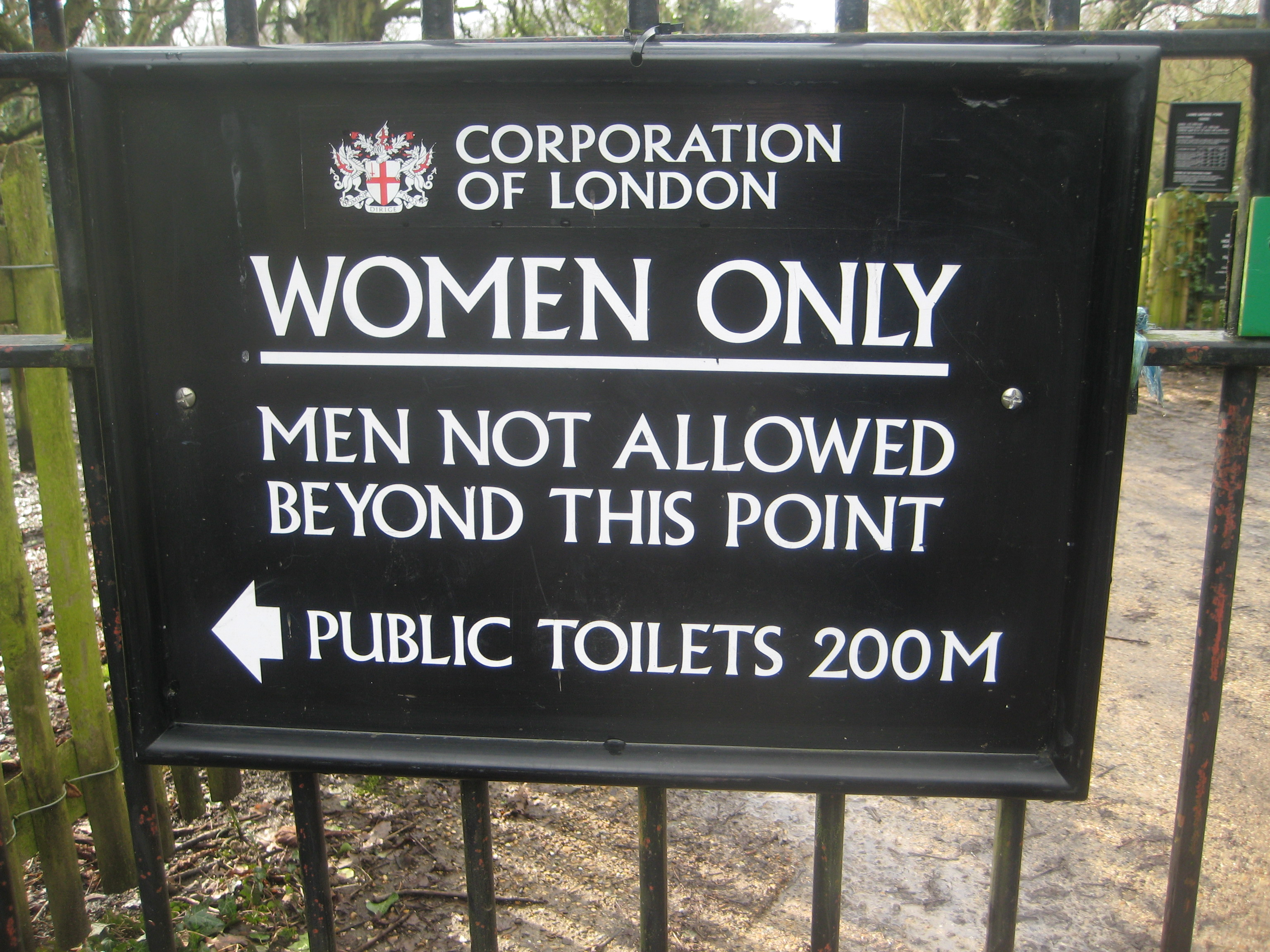
Women-only toilets

In public spaces toilet and changing rooms are commonly sex segregates to provide privacy and safety. Efforts have also emerged to create gender-inclusive facilities in line with evolving discussions around gender identity.

=== Menstruation ===
Cultural attitudes toward menstruation vary widely. In parts of rural Africa, such as Malawi and Uganda, girls may be secluded because of cultural taboos related to menstruation.
