= Women-only bank =

A women-only bank is a financial institution catering exclusively to women. They are mostly based in Islamic countries to allow women to bank without being chaperoned.

== Development ==
Women-only banks arose out of a need for single women to be able to bank without a male chaperone due to gender segregation laws within Saudi Arabia. The first women-only branches were opened in the country by National Commercial Bank, who opened them in 1980 in Jeddah and Riyadh for the purposes of attracting female customers to bank with them. Often banks would open women only branches in the 1990s, but these branches would often only provide a limited service with low ATM withdrawal limits and more complex financial transactions needing to be referred to the men's branch of the bank. By the 2000s, women-only banks were attributed to a fourfold increase in the number of women working in the banking sector within Saudi Arabia. In 2001, Dubai Islamic Bank opened a women-only bank branch.

By the mid-2010s, companies were often investing in women-only banks due to gradual liberalisation of women's rights in the country. In Saudi Arabia, most banks have some sort of women-only branch within the main branch. In 2016, following the Saudi government granting women the right to drive, women only banks started underpinning car finance arrangements for car showrooms.

Iran opened such a bank in Mashhad on 7 June 2010. The bank's director stated, "the aim is not sex segregation but respect for women." The government-owned bank is Bank Melli. In 2013, India launched its first public sector bank for women only, Bharatiya Mahila Bank, in Mumbai, aimed at economically empowering millions of women in India.

== See also ==
- Women's rights
- Women's World Banking
- Women-only space
