= Ladies Rest Room =

- U.S. National Register of Historic Places
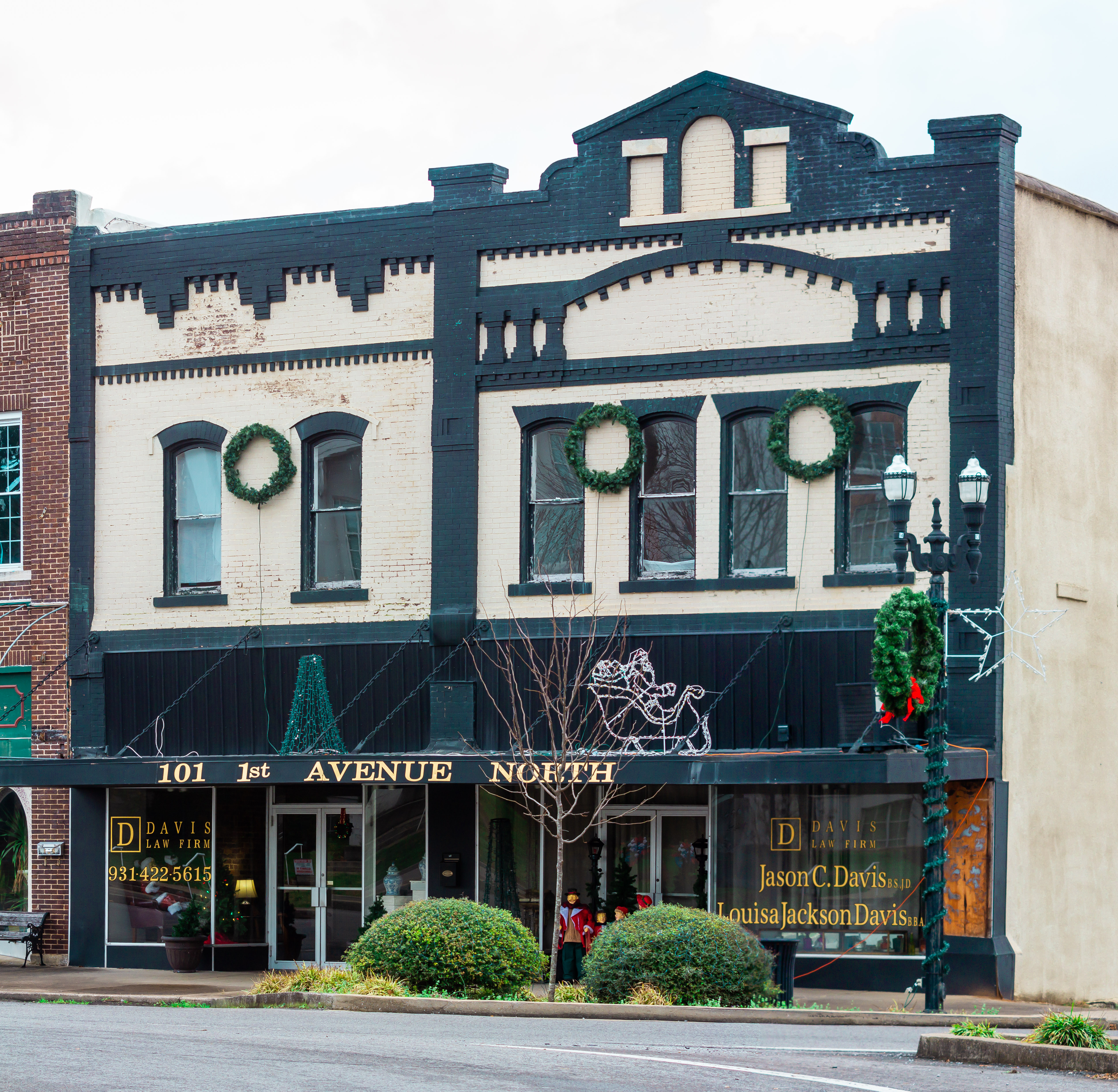
- The Ladies Rest Room as of January 2022

- Location within Tennessee Location within the United States
- Location: 105 1st Ave. N., Lewisburg, Tennessee
- Coordinates: 35°27′1″N 86°47′15″W
- Area: less than one acre
- Built: 1924
- Built by: J. L. Sanders
- Architect: A. C. Colley
- Architectural style: Colonial Revival
- NRHP reference No.: 95001380
- Added to NRHP: November 29, 1995

The Ladies Rest Room is a historic building in Lewisburg, Tennessee, that is listed on the National Register of Historic Places.

The Ladies Rest Room was built by the Marshall County court in 1924 as a place for rural women to relax, rest, and eat during their visits to Lewisburg, the county seat. During the 1910s and 1920s, there was widespread encouragement in the United States for the establishment of ladies' lounges and rest rooms to accommodate rural women who traveled into county seats and market towns to conduct business. It was suggested that if country women had comfortable in-town accommodations for themselves and their young children, they would visit town more frequently and would buy more consumer products from local stores. Also, agricultural reformers perceived that ladies' rest rooms would provide increased opportunities for agricultural extension workers and home demonstration agents to reach farm women. By 1917, the U.S. Department of Agriculture reported that there were about 200 rest rooms for rural women around the country, largely in the West and Midwest; it was not until the 1920s that the concept was widely adopted in Tennessee. Most ladies' rest room facilities were rooms inside stores, courthouses, or other civic buildings; the Ladies Rest Room in Lewisburg is unusual for being housed in its own separate building. It is thought to be the first and possibly the only stand-alone ladies' rest room in Tennessee.

The building is a one-story rectangular red brick structure with a basement, built in the Colonial Revival style. It was designed by A. C. Colley, a Nashville architect, and constructed by local builder J. L. Sanders. Exterior features include a covered porch that wraps around the front of the building and part of one side, wooden columns on brick pilasters, a parapet roof with a wooden cornice, and wooden trellises. The building interior includes a large reception room in the front, a bathroom and hall in the building's midsection, and a private bedroom in the rear (provided for the live-in matron who was hired by the county to maintain the facility and supervise its operation). The basement houses a kitchen and dining area.

The Ladies Rest Room proved popular. Shortly after it opened in 1924, the county's home demonstration agent reported that "constant use is being made of it by the country people." It became customary for farm families to travel into Lewisburg on Saturdays and important court days, with the men gathering in the county courthouse and their wives congregating in the Ladies Rest Room.

The Ladies Rest Room building was listed on the National Register of Historic Places in 1995. At the time of its listing, it was still being used for its original purpose.

== See also ==
- Public toilet
- Women-only space
