= Tremont House (Boston) =

Former hotel in Boston, 1829–1895

Coordinates: 42°21′28.08″N 71°3′38.39″W

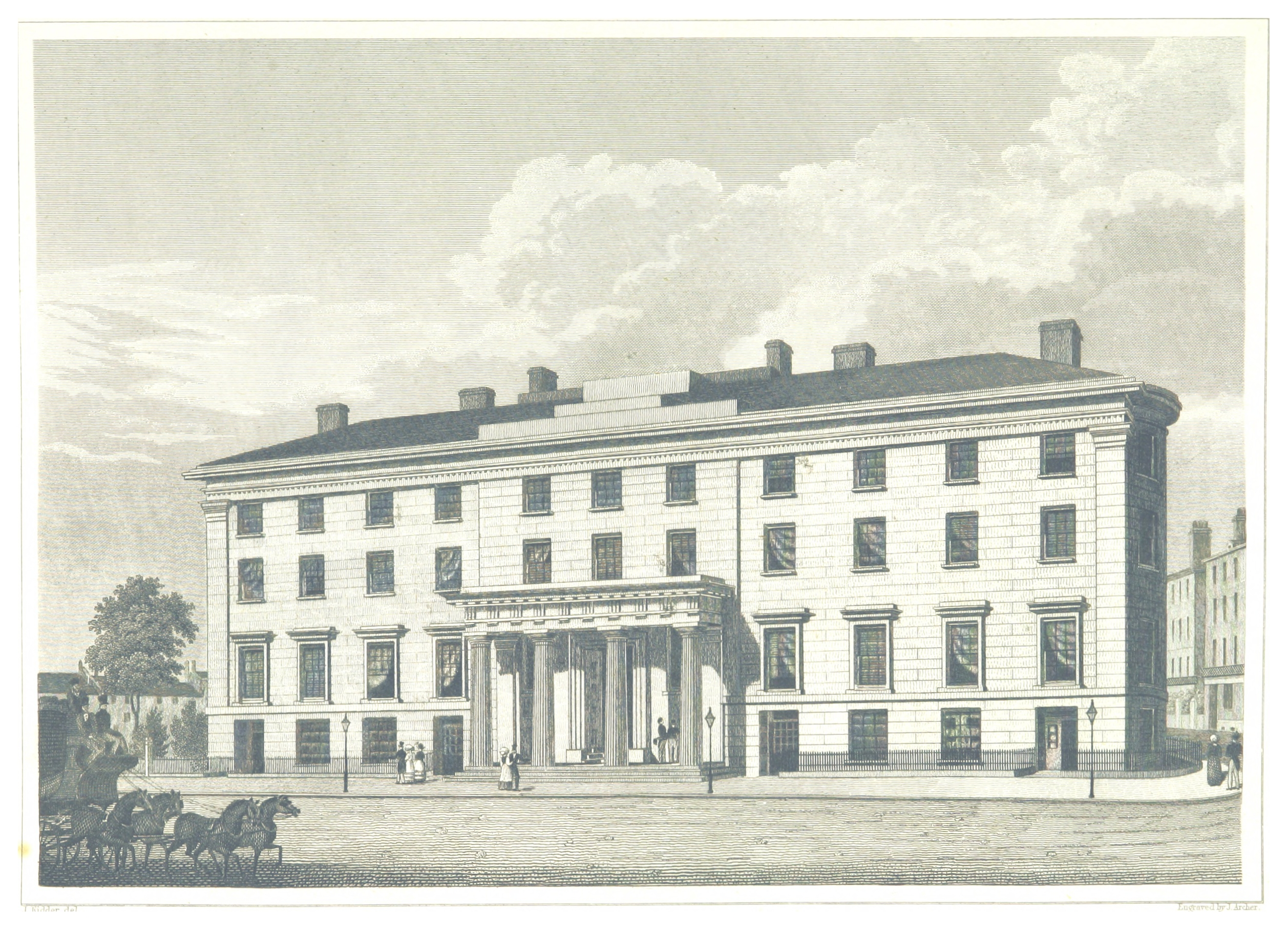
Tremont House in 1834 rendering

Tremont House (1829 – c.1900), sometimes called the Tremont Hotel, was a hotel designed in 1829 by Isaiah Rogers in Boston, Massachusetts. Notable guests included Davy Crockett and Charles Dickens.

== History ==
=== Opening ===
Tremont House was a first-class hotel in Boston designed by Isaiah Rogers. Located on Tremont Street, construction began on July 4, 1828 and the hotel opened on October 16, 1829. For the grand opening, the hotel hosted a banquet for important local guests, charging just $1 per person. The architecture of Tremont House established a reputation for Rogers, who later accepted commissions for many other first-class hotels, including Astor House in New York, Battle House in Mobile, Alabama, Burnet House in Cincinnati, the Charleston Hotel in Charleston, South Carolina, Galt House in Louisville, Kentucky, and the St. Charles Hotel in New Orleans.

Tremont House opened on October 16, 1829 with a dinner attended by Josiah Quincy III, Daniel Webster, several members of Congress and local merchants.

== Description ==
The Tremont House was located at the corner of Tremont and Beacon Streets (Common Street on the old maps). The main entrance on Tremont was accentuated with a tetrastyle Doric portico. The frontage was 205-feet long and faced in white granite. The Greek temple design resembled bank buildings of the day.

Among its innovations for a tavern or hotel:

- Indoor plumbing
- Indoor toilets and baths
- Reception area
- Locked rooms
- Free soap for each room
- Bowl and pitcher for each room
- Gaslight illumination for each room
- Remote call bell system

Among this long list of innovations, it is probably best known as the first hotel with indoor plumbing and running water. The hotel's water was raised by steam-powered pump to a storage tank on its roof, where it fed by gravity to the taps. Eight water closets (toilets) were provided on the ground floor. Bathrooms for bathing were located in the basement, and served by cold running water. Bathtubs were copper or tin, with local gas heating for the tub's water. Running water was also provided to the kitchen and laundry. A simple system removed the waste water to the sewage system.

Tremont House in the mid-1800s

During the 19th century it was socially unacceptable for women to dine alone in the public rooms of hotels. The hotel was among the first urban establishments to open a women-only dining room, referred to as a 'Ladies' ordinary'.

The Tremont House set the standard for luxury accommodations and was the model for many hotels built in major cities at this time. One of the most notable, also designed by Isaiah Rogers, was the Astor House (1836) in New York City.

From 1895-1900 Tremont House was owned by the Stranahan family and was managed by Frank D. Stranhan who later co-founded the Champion spark plug manufacturing company in Boston in 1908.

== Notable guests ==
- Daniel Webster

== Bibliography ==
- Berger, Molly W. (2011). Hotel Dreams: Luxury, Technology, and Urban Ambition in America, 1829−1929. Baltimore: Johns Hopkins University Press. ISBN 978-0-8018-9987-4.
- Klimasmith, Betsy. At Home in the City: Urban Domesticity in American Literature and Culture, 1850−1930. Durham, NH: University of New Hampshire Press. ISBN 1-58465-497-X.
- Sandoval-Strausz, A. K. (2007). Hotel: An American Story. New Haven: Johns Hopkins University Press. ISBN 978-0-300-14202-0.
- Williamson, Jefferson (1930). The American Hotel: An Anecdotal History. New York: Alfred A. Knopf.

== Images ==
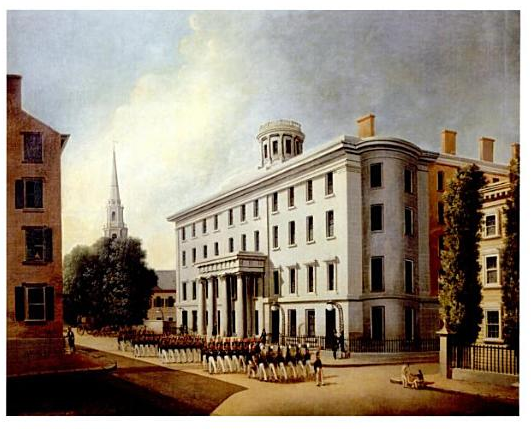
Painting by James Bennett, c. 1830s

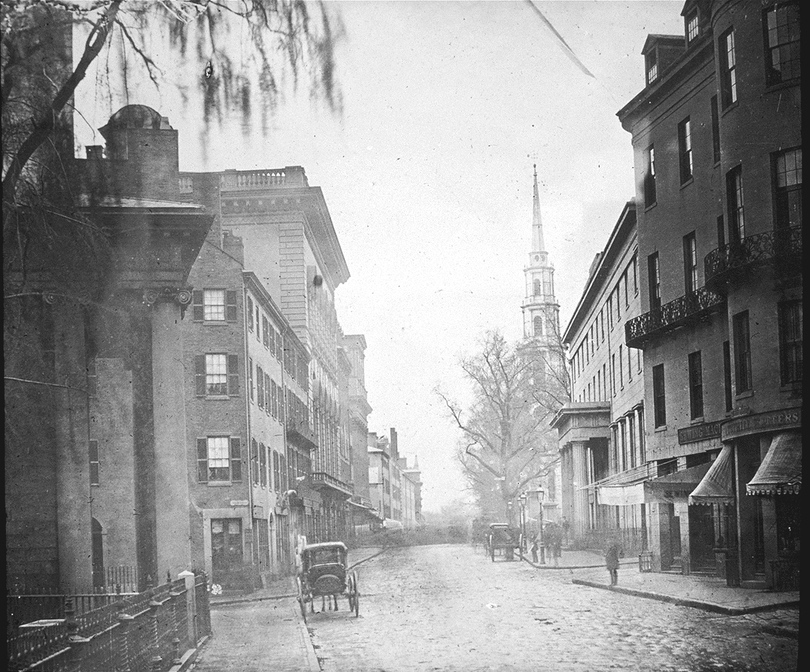
Tremont Street, 1860s; Tremont House at right, Park St. Church in distance

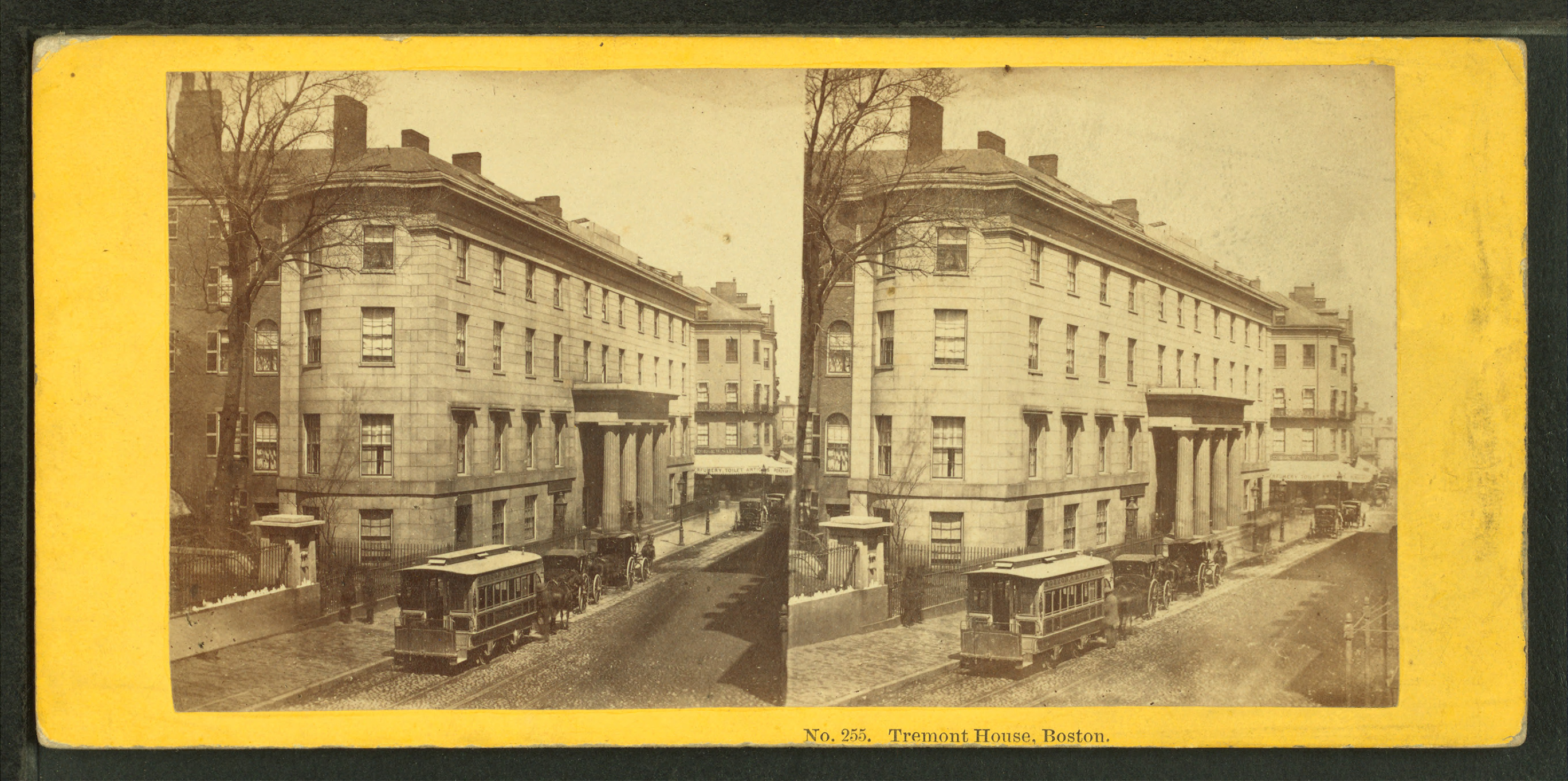
19th-century photo by John P. Soule

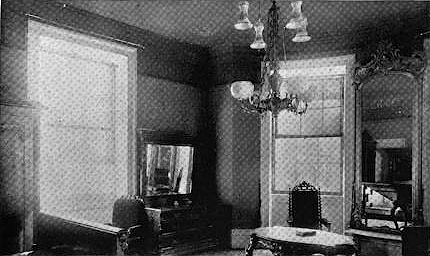
Room No.29, occupied by Charles Dickens and others.

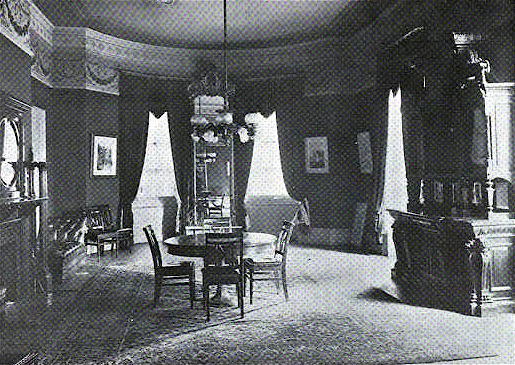
Interior, 1894

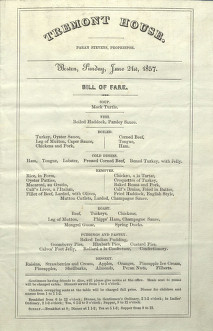
Tremont House menu on June 21, 1857
