= Sex segregation =

Physical, legal, and cultural separation of people according to their gender or sex

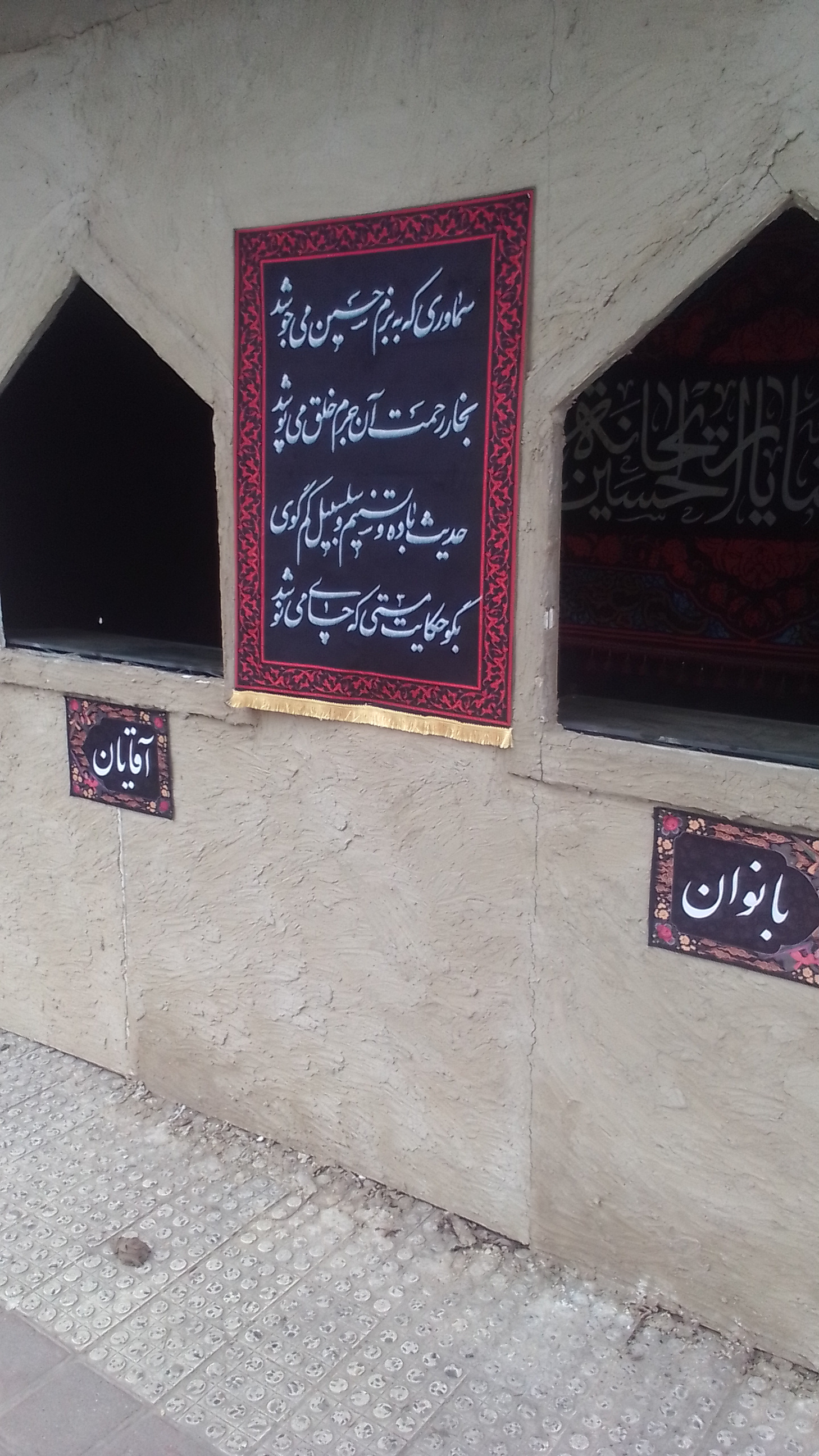
Sex segregation in a religious ceremony in Iran; the window on the left is for men, and the window on the right is for women.

Sex separation is common for public toilets and is often indicated by stick-figure gender symbols on the toilet doors.

Sex segregation is the physical and sometimes legal separation of people according to their gender or sex at any age. Sex segregation can simply refer to the physical and spatial separation by sex without any connotation of illegal discrimination. In other circumstances, sex segregation can be controversial. Depending on the circumstances, it can be a violation of capabilities and human rights and can create economic inefficiencies; on the other hand, some supporters argue that it is central to certain religious laws and social and cultural histories and traditions. Other terms used for sex segregation include sex separation, sex partition, gender segregation, gender separation, or gender partition

Sex segregation is a global phenomenon manifested differently in varying localities. Sex segregation and integration considered harmless or normal in one country can be considered radical or illegal in others. At the same time, many laws and policies promoting segregation or desegregation recur across multiple national contexts. Safety and privacy concerns, traditional values and cultural norms, and belief that sex segregation can produce positive educational and overall social outcomes all shape public policy regarding sex segregation.

== Definitions ==
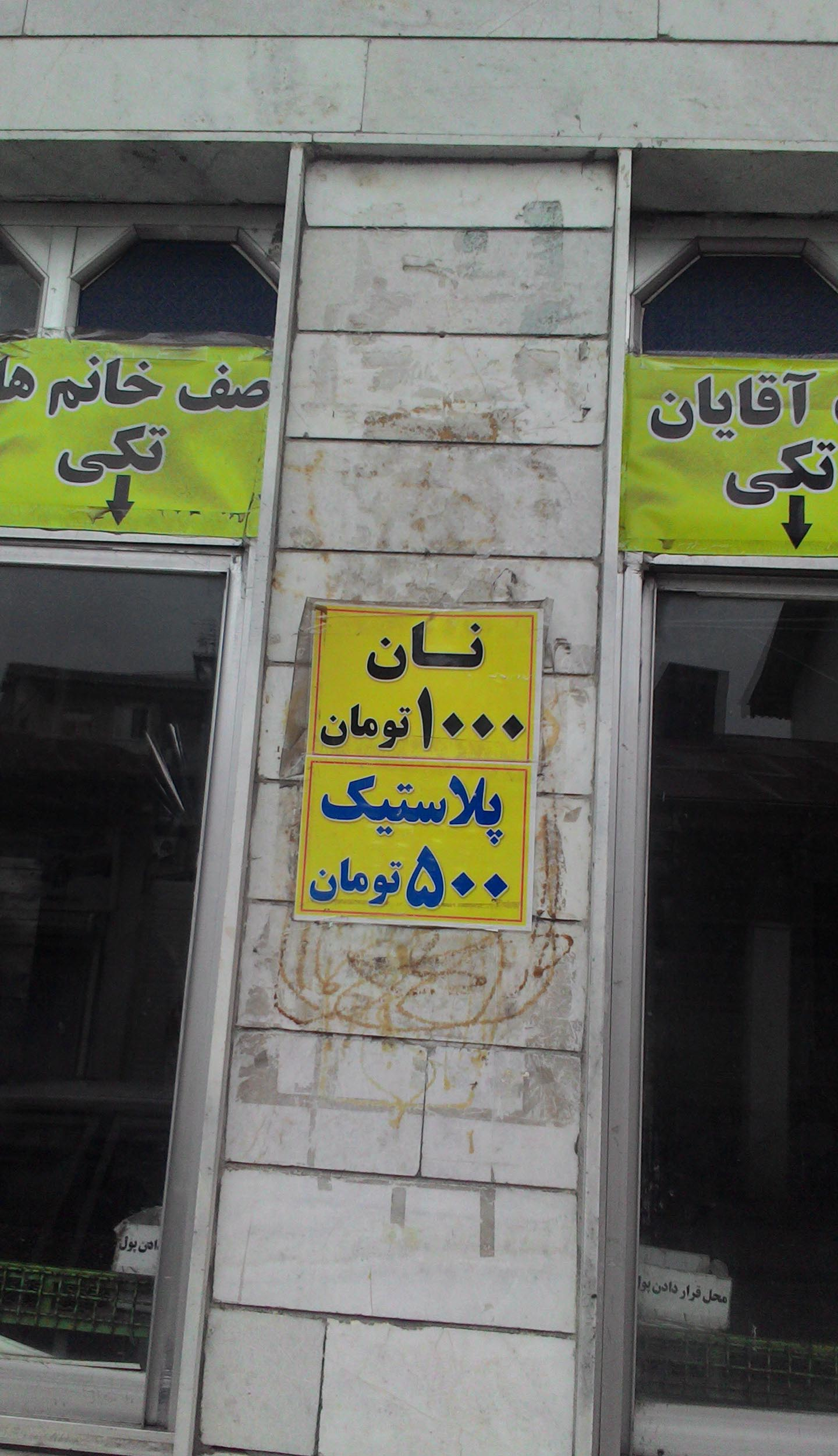
A bakery with two windows to separate male and female customers, Iran, 2021. In this bakery the right side window is for men and left window for women. In Iran; Apart from bakeries, mosques, schools, libraries, music concerts, public transport and many other places are sex segregated.

The term "sex" in "sex segregation" refers to the biological distinctions between men and women, used in contrast to "gender". The term "segregation" refers to separation of the sexes, which can be enforced by rules, laws, and policies, or be a de facto outcome in which people are separated by sex. Even as a de facto outcome, sex segregation taken as a whole can be caused by societal pressures, historical practices, socialized preferences and “fundamental biological differences”. Sex segregation can refer to literal physical and spatial separation by sex. The term is also used for the exclusion of one sex from participation in an occupation, institution, or group. Sex segregation can be complete or partial, as when members of one sex predominate within, but do not exclusively constitute, a group or organization.

In the United States some scholars use the term sex separation and not sex segregation.

The term gender apartheid (or sexual apartheid) also has been applied to segregation of people by gender, implying that it is sexual discrimination. If sex segregation is a form of sex discrimination, its effects have important consequences for gender equality and equity.

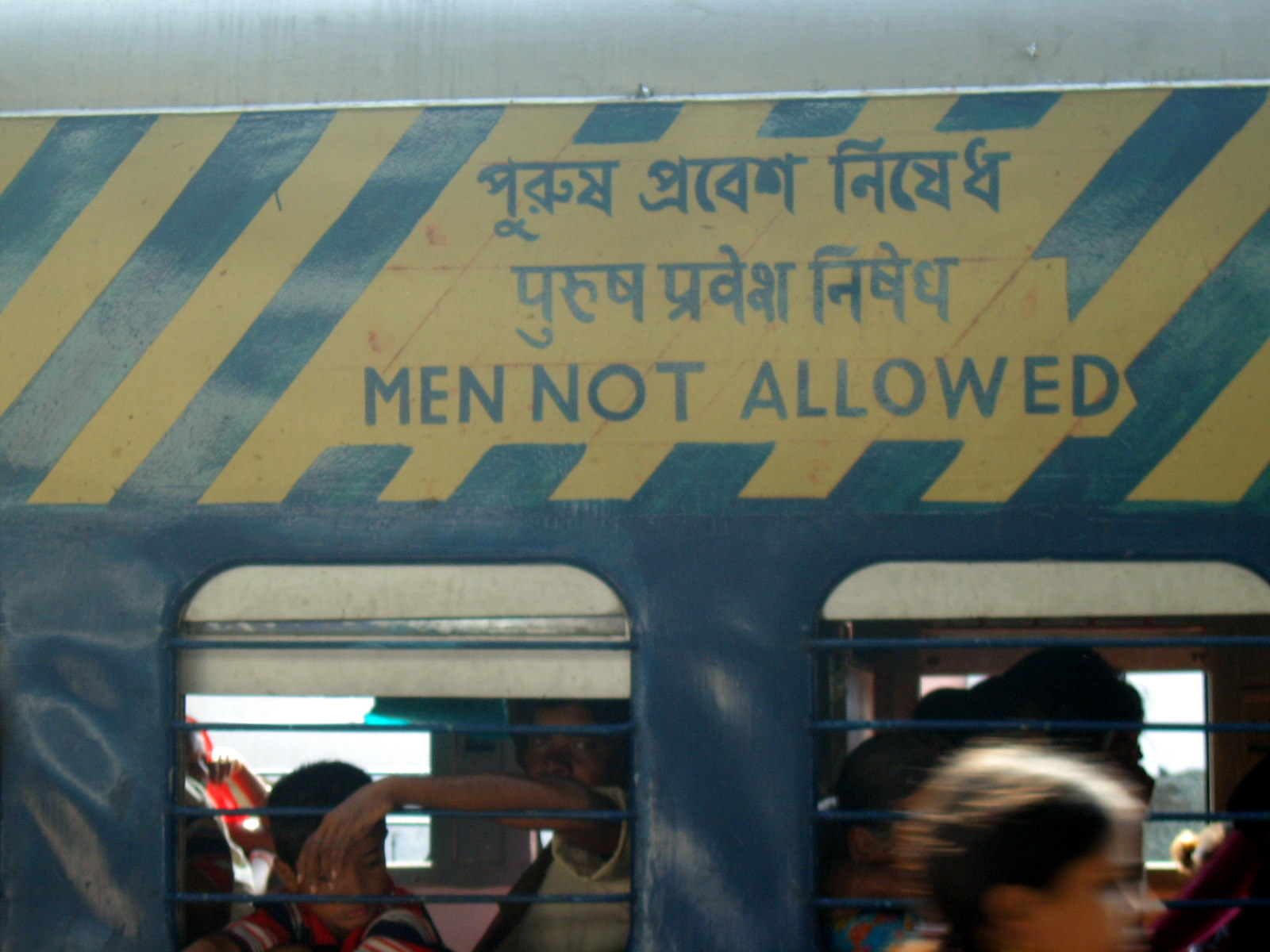
A sign mandating sex segregation on a women's only train car in India

== Types ==
Sex segregation can occur in both public and private contexts, and be classified in many ways. It is the practice of separating people based on their gender and can take a variety of forms in different contexts. Legal and gender studies scholar David S. Cohen offers one taxonomy in categorizing sex segregation as mandatory, administrative, permissive, or voluntary. Mandatory and administrative sex segregation are required and enforced by governments in public environments, while permissive and voluntary sex segregation are stances chosen by public or private institutions, but within the capacity of the law. Examples: Separate restrooms and locker rooms for men and women in public buildings, sex-segregated prisons or detention centers, sex-specific sports competitions, especially where physical differences are considered important.

=== Mandatory ===
Mandatory sex segregation is legally required and enforces separation based on sex. Examples include separation of men and women in prisons, law enforcement, military service, public toilets, and housing. These mandatory rules can be nuanced, as in military service, where sexes are often separated in laws about conscription, in housing, and in regulations on which sexes can participate in certain roles, like frontline infantry. Mandatory sex segregation also includes less obvious cases of separation, as when men and women are required to have same-sex attendants for body searches. Mandatory sex segregation can thus dictate parameters for employment in sex segregated spaces, including medical and care work contexts, and can be a form of occupational segregation. For example, a government may mandate that clinics hire female nurses to care for female patients.

=== Administrative ===
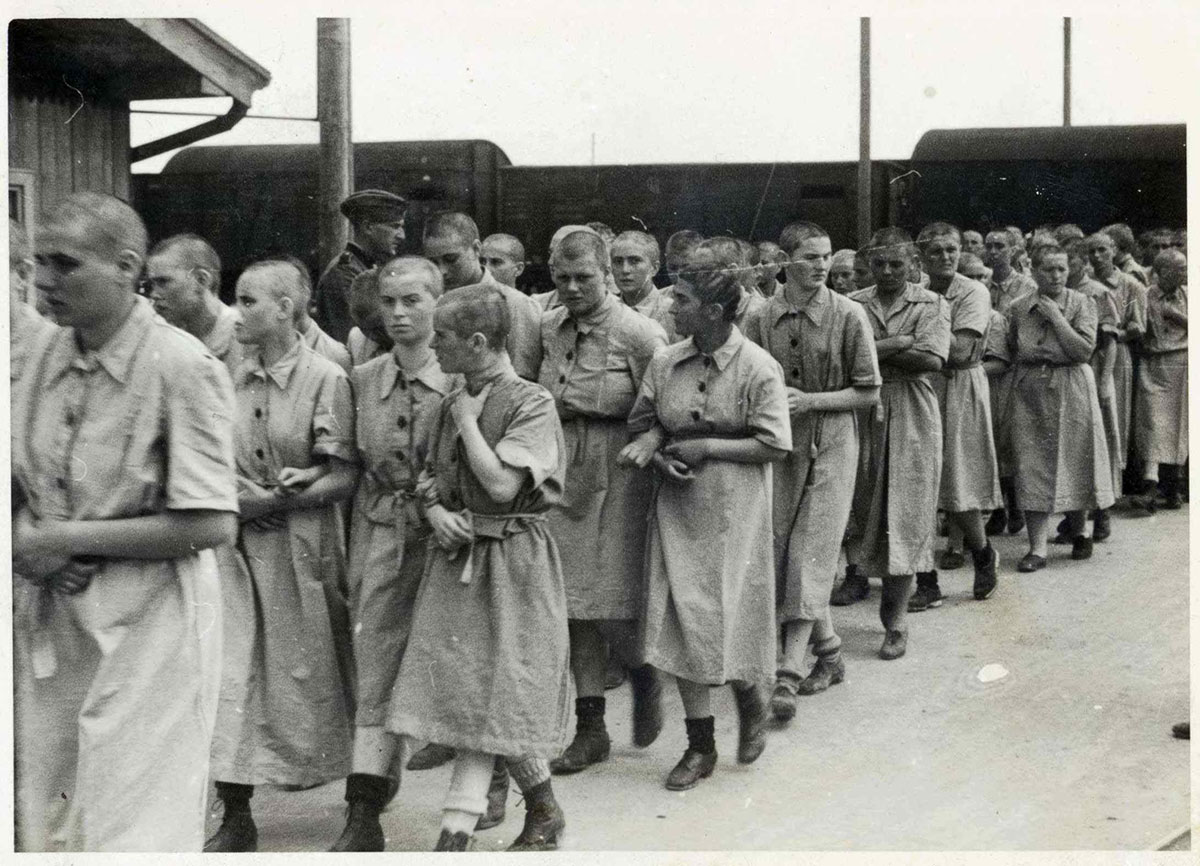
Segregation of women inmates in Auschwitz concentration camp during the Holocaust

Administrative sex segregation involves public and government institutions segregating by sex in their operating capacity, rather than as the result of a formal mandate. This segregation often stems from practical considerations, organizational norms, or social expectations, rather than formal legal requirements. Examples of administrative sex segregation include sex segregation in government sponsored medical research, sports leagues, public hospitals with shared rooms, rehabilitation programs, and some public education facilities. Administrative sex segregation can occur in these environments simply as through the provisioning of sex segregated public toilets despite limited explicit legal requirements to do so.

=== Permissive ===
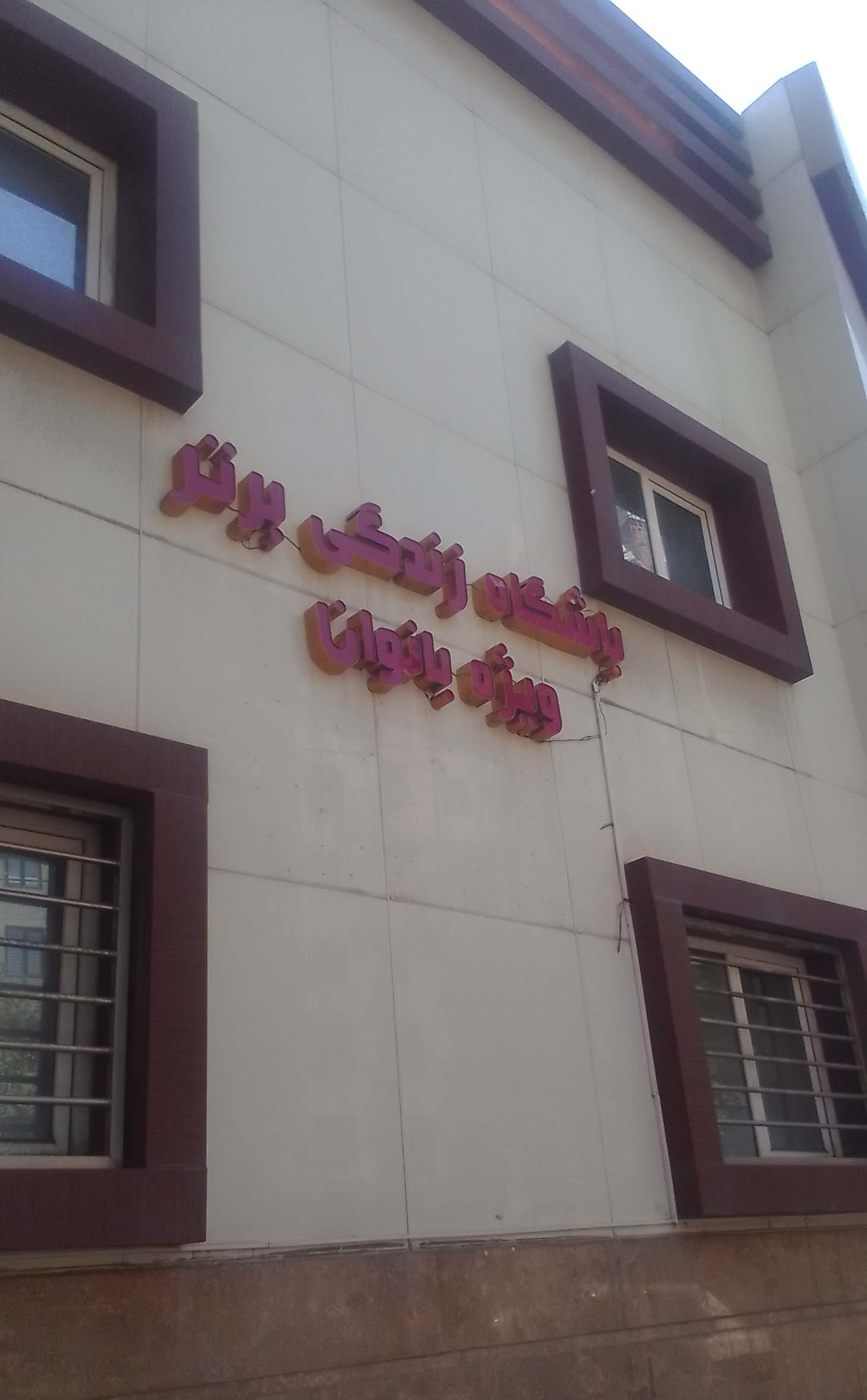
A women-only sports club in Iran, 2023

Permissive sex segregation is segregation which is explicitly permitted by law, i.e. affirmatively authorized, but not necessarily legally required or encouraged. Permissive sex segregation exempts certain things from anti-sex-discrimination laws, often allowing for, among others, segregation of religious and military schools, undergraduate schools that have traditionally admitted based on sex, health clubs, athletic teams, social fraternities and sororities, choirs and choruses, voluntary youth service organizations such as the Girl Scouts and Boy Scouts, father/son and mother/daughter activities, and sex-exclusive beauty pageants and scholarships.

=== Voluntary ===
Sex segregation that is neither legally mandated, nor enacted in an administrative capacity, nor explicitly permitted by law, is recognized as voluntary sex segregation. Voluntary sex segregation refers to lack of explicit legal prescriptions; it does not necessarily indicate the free choice of either the segregated or the segregators, and it may be imposed by social and cultural norms. Voluntary sex segregation takes place in numerous national professional and interest-based membership organizations, local and larger clubs, professional sports teams, private recreational facilities, religious institutions, performing arts, and more.

== Theory ==
=== Libertarianism ===
Briefly Libertarian feminist theory says that legal and governmental institutions should not regulate choices and should allow people's free will to govern their life trajectories. Libertarianism takes a free market approach to sex segregation saying that women have a natural right and are the most informed to make decisions for themselves but rejects special protections specifically for women.

Libertarianism most directly relates to voluntary sex segregation as it maintains that the government should not regulate private institutions or entities' segregation by sex and should not regulate how individuals privately group themselves. Libertarian feminist David Berstein argues that while sex segregation can cause harm, guarding the freedom of choice for men and women is more important than preventing such sex segregation since methods of prevention can often cause more harm than good for both sexes. Women's health clubs are an example of how sex segregation benefits women since desegregation would interfere with women's abilities to exercise without the distraction of men and 'ogling' without any direct benefit to allowing men a membership. Additionally, libertarians would allow for permissive sex segregation since it allows people to choose how to organize their interactions and relationships with others. Libertarian feminists acknowledge that there is legal precedence for sex segregation laws, but argue for such parameters to ensure equal treatment of similarly situated men and women. As such, libertarianism could allow or reject specific forms of sex segregation created to account for natural or biological differences between the sexes.

=== Equal treatment ===
Equal treatment theory or formal equity often works in tandem with libertarianism in that equal treatment theorists believe governments should treat men and women similarly when their situations are similar. In countries whose governments have taken to legislation eliminating sex segregation, equal treatment theory is most frequently used as support for such rules and regulation. For example, equal treatment theory was adopted by many feminists during the United States' feminist movement in the 1970s. This utilization of equal treatment theory led to the adoption of intermediate scrutiny as a standard for sex discrimination on the basis that men and women should be treated equally when in similar situations. While equal treatment theory provides a sound framework for equality, application is quite tricky, as many critics question the standards by which men and women should be treated similarly or differently. In this manner, libertarianism and equal treatment theory provide good foundations for their agendas in sex segregation, but conceptually do not prevent it, leaving room for mandatory and administrative sex segregation to remain as long as separation is based on celebrated differences between men and women. Some forms of mandatory and administrative segregation may perpetuate sex segregation by depicting a difference between male and female employees where there is no such difference, as in combat exclusion policies.

=== Difference feminism ===
Difference feminism arose from libertarianism and equal treatment theories' perceived failure to create systemic equality for women. Difference feminism celebrates biological, psychological, moral differences between men and women, accusing laws concerning sex segregation of diluting these important differences. Difference feminists believe that such laws not only ignore these important differences, but also can exclude participation of women in the world. Difference feminism's goal is to bring about a consciousness of women's femininity and to cause the revaluation of women's attributes in a more respectful, reverent manner.
Difference feminism and equal treatment theory are quite contrasting feminist theories of sex segregation. Difference feminism often justifies sex segregation through women's and men's differences while equal treatment theory does not support separation because of differences in sex. Difference feminism, however, argues against segregation that stems from societal and "old-fashioned" differences between men and women, but believes that segregation that takes women's differences into account and promotes equality is acceptable, even going so far as to say that some forms of sex segregation are necessary to ensure equality, such as athletics and education, and policies such as Title IX.

=== Anti-subordination ===
Anti-subordination feminist theory examines sex segregation of power to determine whether women are treated or placed subordinately compared to men in a law or situation. The theory focuses on male dominance and female subordination and promotes destroying a sex-based hierarchy in legal and social institutions and preventing future hierarchies from arising. Anti-subordination also supports laws that promote the status of women even if they lower men's status as a consequence. Controversial applications of anti-subordination that can either perpetuate the subordination of women or create the subordination of men include sex segregation in education and in the military.

=== Critical race feminism ===
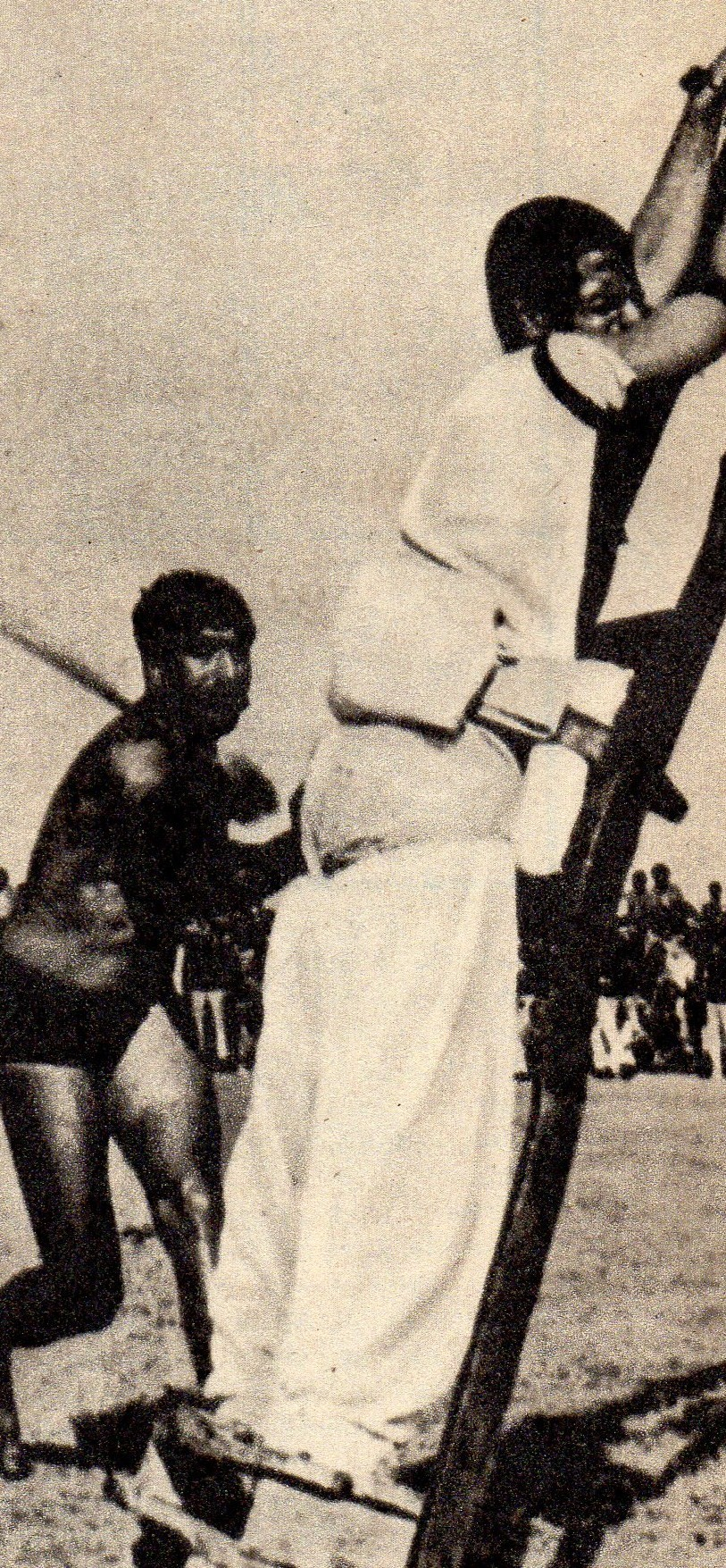
Mingling between people of opposite sex is forbidden in Pakistan. Flogging of a man who seduced a woman in Islamabad, Pakistan (1970s)

Critical race feminism developed due to the lack of racial inclusivity of feminist theories and lack of gender inclusivity of racial theories. This theory is more global than the others, attempting to take into account the intersectionality of gender and race. Critical race feminism demands that theorists reexamine surface-level segregation and focus on how sex segregation stems from different histories, causing different effects based on race, especially for women of color. This segregation is evident in many racially divided countries, especially in the relationship between the end of race-segregated schools and sex segregation. Critical race feminism critiques other theories' failure to take into account their different applications once race, class, sexual orientation, or other identity factors are included in a segregated situation. It creates the need to examine mandatory and administrative sex segregation to determine whether or if they sustain racial stereotypes, particularly towards women of color. Additionally, critical race feminists wonder whether permissive and voluntary sex segregation are socially acceptable manners by which to separate races and sexes or whether they maintain and perpetuate inequalities. Critical race feminism is a form of anti-essentialism (below).

=== Anti-essentialism ===
Anti-essentialists maintain that sex and gender categories are limiting and fail to include the unlimited variety of difference in human identity and impose identities rather than simply note their differences. Theorists believe that there is variation in what it means to be a man and what it means to be a woman, and by promoting the differences through sex segregation, people are confined to categories, limiting freedom. Anti-essentialists examine how society imposes specific identities within the sex dichotomy and how subsequently sex and gender hierarchies are created, perpetuated, and normalized. This theory requires that there is a specific disentanglement between sex and gender. Anti-essentialists believe that there should not be an idea of what constitutes masculinity or femininity, but that individual characteristics should be fluid to eliminate sex and gender-based stereotypes. No specific types of sex segregation are outwardly promoted or supported by anti-essentialists since mandatory and administrative sex segregation reinforce power struggles between the sexes and genders while permissive or voluntary forms of sex segregation allow institutions and society to sort individuals into categories with differential access to power, and supporting the government's elimination of such permission for certain institutions and norms to continue to exist.

== Motivations for applying sex segregation ==
=== Motivated by safety or privacy ===
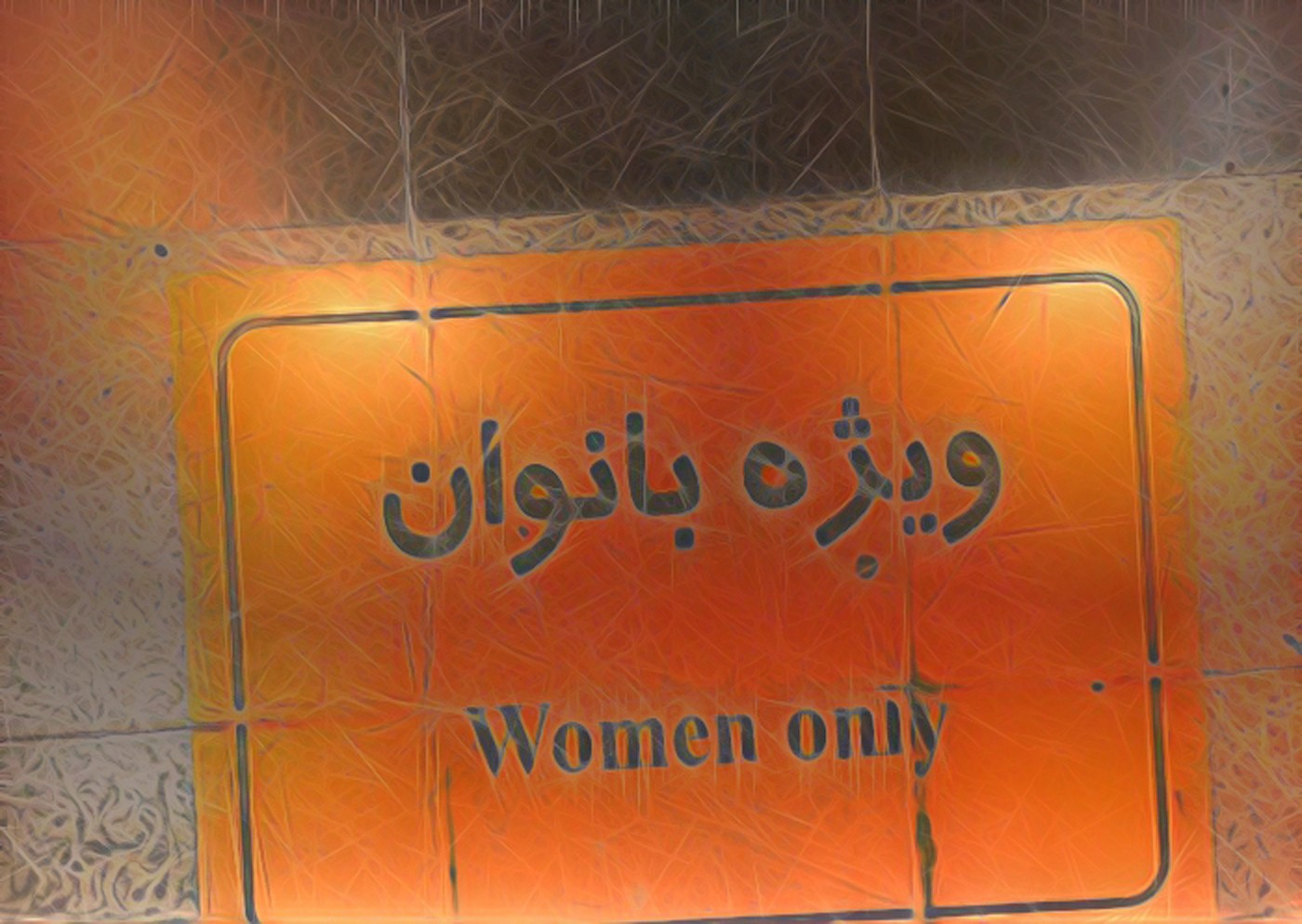
Women-only announcement, Tehran Subway

Some sex segregation occurs for reasons of safety and privacy. Worldwide, laws often mandate sex segregation in public toilets, changing rooms, showers, and similar spaces, based on a common perceived need for privacy. This type of segregation policy can protect against sexual harassment and sexual abuse. To combat groping, street harassment, and what in India is called 'eve teasing', of women in crowded public places, some countries have also designated women-only spaces. For example, sex-segregated buses, women-only passenger cars, and compartments on trains have been introduced in Mexico, Japan, the Philippines, the UAE and other countries to reduce sexual harassment.

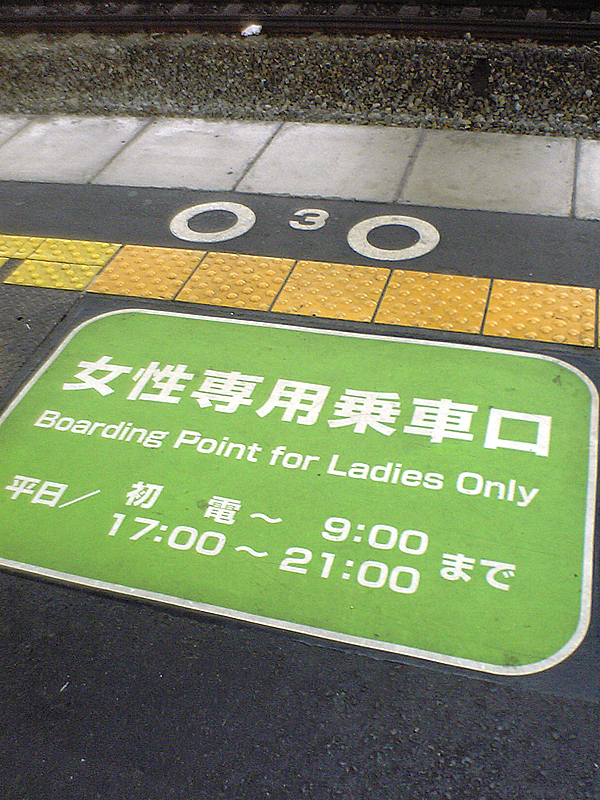
A sign on a station platform in Osaka, Japan, showing the boarding point for a ladies-only car

Some places in Germany, Korea, and China all have women's parking spaces, often for related safety issues. Many more countries, including Canada, the United States, Italy, Japan, and the United Kingdom also grant parking privileges to pregnant women for safety or access reasons.

Sex segregation rooted in safety considerations can furthermore extend beyond the physical to the psychological and emotional as well. A refuge for battered mothers or wives may refuse to admit men, even those who are themselves the victims of domestic violence, both to exclude those who might commit or threaten violence to women and because women who have been subjected to abuse by a male might feel threatened by the presence of any man. Women's health clinics and women's resource centers, whether in Africa or North America, are further examples of spaces where sex segregation may facilitate private and highly personal decisions. Women-only banks may be similarly intended to provide autonomy to women's decision making.

=== Feminist separatism ===
Feminist separatism or separatist feminism is the theory that feminist opposition to patriarchy can be achieved through women's sex segregation from men. Much of the theorising is based on lesbian feminism.

=== Motivated by religion ===
Sex segregation can also be motivated by religious or cultural ideas about men and women. Such cultural assumptions may even exist in the aforementioned policies enacted under the pretenses of safety or privacy concerns. Gender separation in Judaism and gender segregation in Islam reflect religiously motivated sex segregation. In Buddhism, Christianity, and Hinduism, monastic orders, prayer spaces, and leadership roles have also been segregated by sex.

From a policy perspective, theocracies and countries with a state religion have sometimes made sex segregation laws based partially in religious traditions. Even when not legally enforced, such traditions can be reinforced by social institutions and in turn result in sex segregation. In the South Asian context, one institution conducive to sex segregation, sometimes but not always rooted in national law, is purdah.

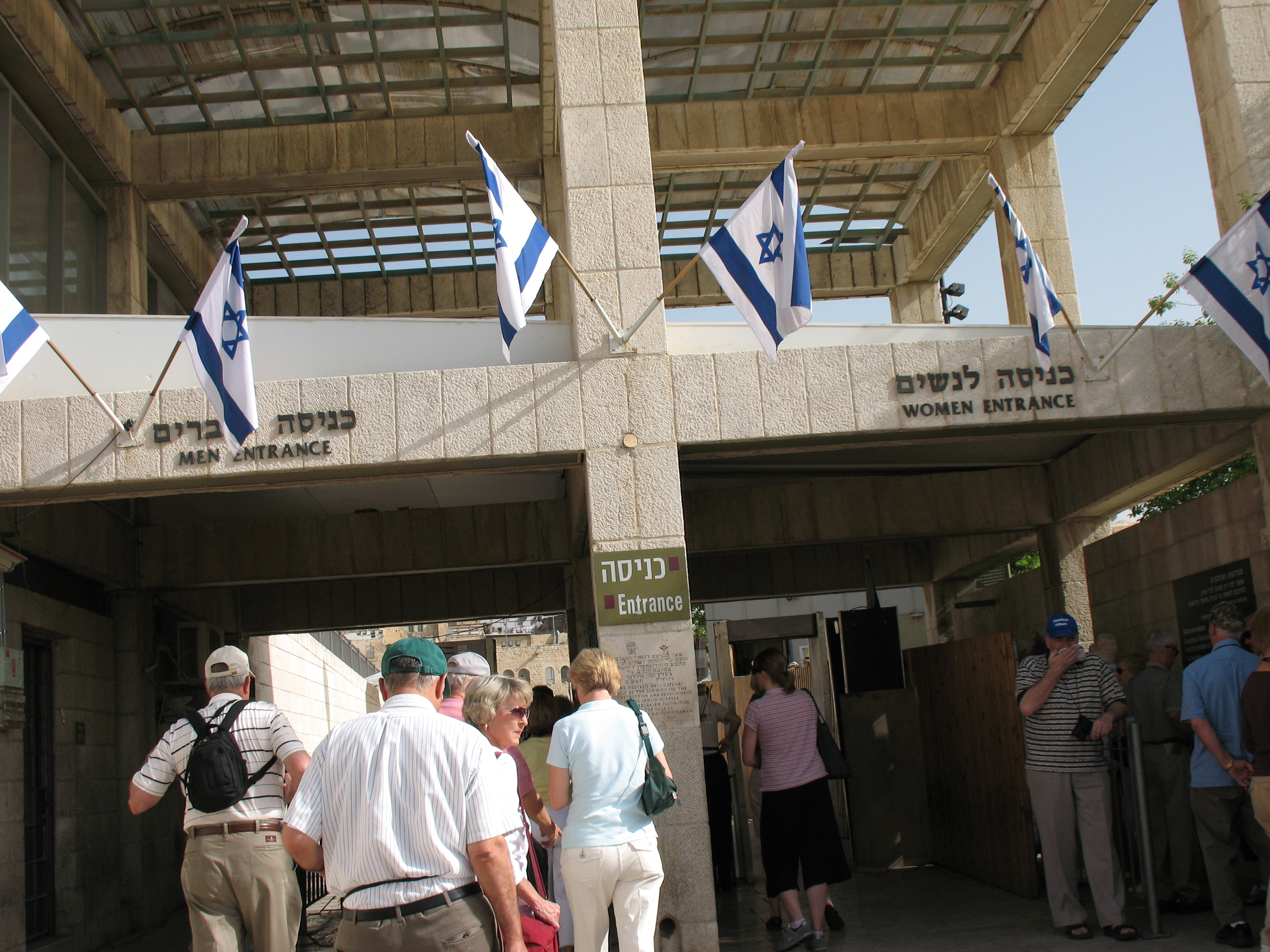
A sex-segregated entrance to the Western Wall, a religious site in Jerusalem

The Muslim world and the Middle East have been particularly scrutinized by scholars analyzing sex segregation resulting from the consequences of Sharia, the moral and religious code of Islam that, in the strictest version, Muslims hold to be the perfect law created by God. Saudi Arabia has been called an epicenter of sex segregation, stemming partially from its conservative Sunni Islamic practices and partially from its monarchy's legal constraints. Sex segregation in Saudi Arabia is not inherent to the country's culture, but was promoted in the 1980s and 1990s by the government, the Sahwa movement, and conservative and religious behavioral enforcers (i.e. police, government officers, etc.).

Israel has also been noted both for its military draft of both sexes and its sex-segregated Mehadrin bus lines.

== Sex segregation in practice ==
=== In education ===
Sex segregation is sometimes pursued through policy because it is thought to produce better educational outcomes. In some parts of the world, especially in Europe, where education is available to girls as well as boys, educational establishments were frequently single-gender. Such single-sex schools are still found in many countries, including but not limited to, Australia, the United Kingdom, and the United States.

In the United States in particular, two federal laws give public and private entities permission to segregate based on sex: Title VII of the Civil Rights Act of 1964 and Title IX of the Educational Amendments of 1972. These laws permit sex segregation of contact sports, choruses, sex education, and in areas such as math and reading, within public schools.

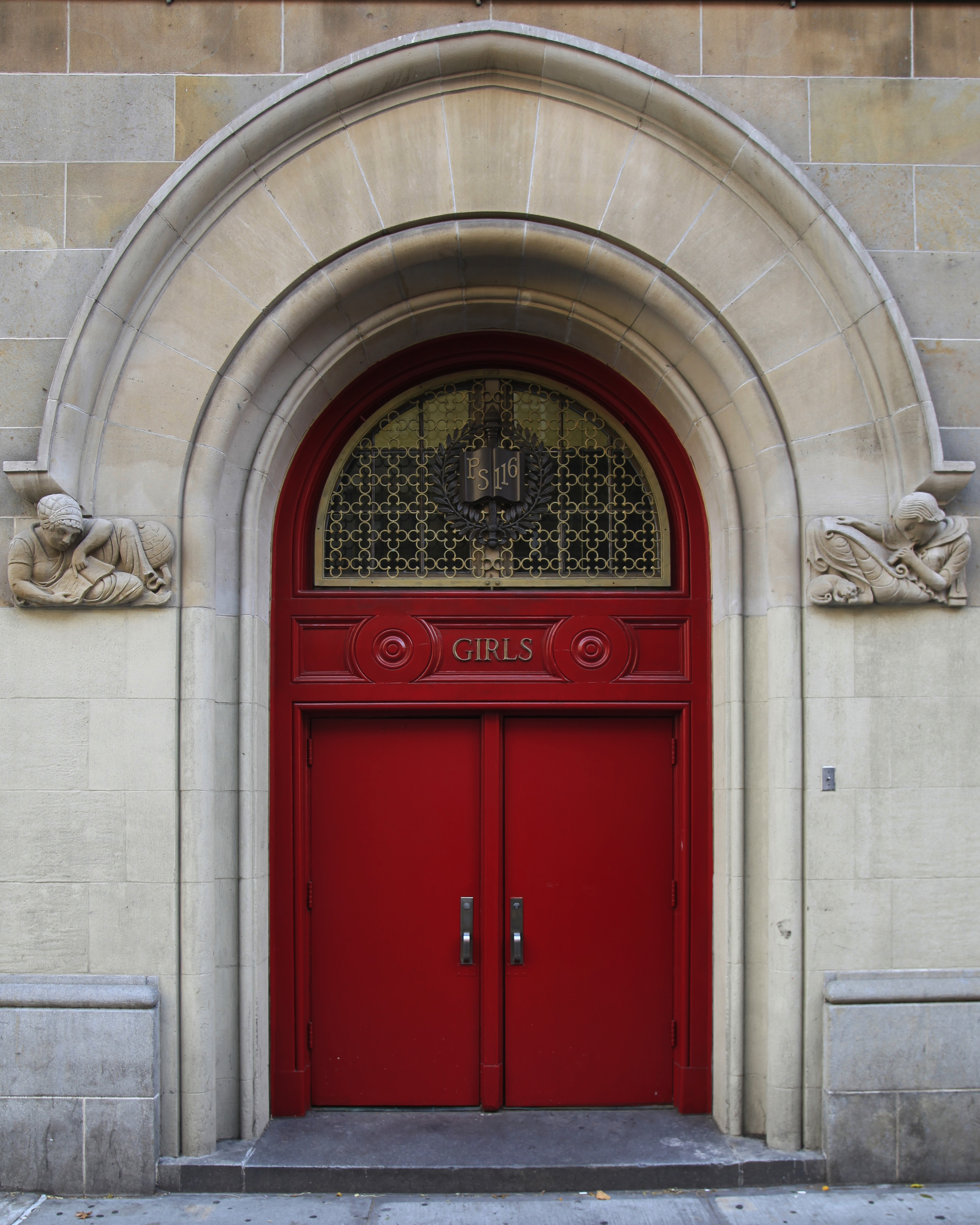
The former girls' entrance to PS 116 in New York City

Studies have analyzed whether single-sex or co-ed schools produce better educational outcomes. Teachers and school environments tend to be more conducive to girls' learning habits and participation rates improve in single-sex schools. In developing countries, single-sex education provides women and girls an opportunity to increase female education and future labor force participation. Girls in single-sex schools outperform their counterparts in co-educational schools in math, average class scores for girls are higher, girls in single-sex math and science classes are more likely to continue to take math and science classes in higher education, and in case studies, boys and girls have reported that single-sex classes and single-sex teachers create a better environment for learning for both sexes.

Critics of single-sex schools and classes claim that single-sex schooling is inherently unequal and that its physical separation contributes to gender bias on an academic and social basis. Single-sex schooling also allegedly limits the socialization between sexes that co-educational schools provide. Coeducational school settings have been shown to foster less anxiety, have happier classrooms, and enable students to participate in a simulated social environment with the tools to maneuver, network, and succeed in the world outside of school. Even in co-ed schools, certain classes, such as sex education, are sometimes segregated on the basis of sex. Parallel education occurs in some schools, when administrators decide to segregate students only in core subjects. Segregation by specialization is also evident in higher education and actually increases with economic development of a country. Cambodia, Laos, Morocco, and Namibia are countries with the least amount of gender segregation in tertiary studies while Croatia, Finland, Japan, and Lithuania have the most.

=== In workplace ===
Physical sex separation is popular in many institutions on a tertiary level (between types of institutions), while fields of study or majors are not highly gendered, such as later life decisions such as work/care work conflicts. Men tend to occupy engineering, manufacturing, science, and construction fields while women dominate education, humanities and arts, social sciences, business, law, and health and welfare fields. However, important life decisions as occupations can yield other instances of sex segregation by impacting occupational sex imbalances and further male and female socialization. Vicki Schultz (1990) indicates that although Title VII of the Civil Rights Act of 1964 prohibits sex discrimination in employment and promised working women change, "most women continue to work in low paying, low status, and traditionally female jobs." Schultz (1990) states that "employers have argued that women lack interest in male-dominated jobs, which are highly rewarded and nontraditional for women." According to Schultz, the courts have accepted this argument, subsequently not holding employers liable. Schultz contends that "the courts have failed to recognize the role of employers in shaping women's work aspirations." (Schultz, 1990:1750,1756) Schultz states that the judicial framework that has been established by the courts "has created an unduly narrow definition of sex discrimination and an overly restrictive role for the law in dismantling sex segregation." (Schultz, 1990:1757) Schultz concludes by saying, "courts can acknowledge their own constructive power and use it to help create a work world in which women are empowered to choose the more highly rewarded occupations that Title VII has long promised." (Schultz, 1990:1843) Even at psychological levels, socialized preferences for or against sex segregation can also have significant effects. In one study, women in male-dominated work settings were the most satisfied psychologically with their jobs while women in occupational settings with only 15-30% men were less satisfied due to favored treatment of the male minority in such a segregated atmosphere. Stark segregation by occupation can lead to a sexual division of labor, influencing the access and control men and women have over inputs and outputs required for labor. Additionally, occupational sex segregation has certain health and safety hazards for each sex, since employment conditions, type of work, and contract and domestic responsibilities vary for types of employment. In many areas of work, women tend to dominate the production line jobs while men occupy managerial and technical jobs. These types of workplace factors and interactions between work and family have been cited by social stratification research as key causes for social inequality. Family roles are especially influential for predicting significant differences in earnings between married couples. Men benefit financially from family roles such as a husband and a father, while women's incomes are lowered when becoming a wife and mother.

Other gender disparities via sex segregation between men and women include differential asset ownership, house and care work responsibilities, and agency in public and private spheres for each sex. These segregations have persisted because of governmental policy, blocked access for a sex, and/or the existence of sex-based societal gender roles and norms. Perpetuation of gender segregation, especially in economic spheres, creates market and institutional failures. For example, women often occupy jobs with flexible working environments in order to take on care work as well as job responsibilities, but since part-time, flexible hourly jobs pay less and have lower levels of benefits, large numbers of women in these lower income jobs lowers incentives to participate in the same market work as their male counterparts, perpetuating occupational gender lines in societies and within households. Schultz (1990) article indicates that "working-class women have made it a priority to end job segregation for they want opportunities that enable them to support them and their families." (Schultz, 1990:1755) Additionally, economic development in countries is positively correlated with female workers in wage employment occupations and negatively correlated with female workers in unpaid or part-time work, self-employment, or entrepreneurship, job sectors often seen occupied by women in developing countries. Many critics of sex segregation see globalization processes as having the potential to promote systemic equality among the sexes.

=== In sports ===
Even outside of educational and occupational settings women's sports are sex segregated from men's sports.

=== In prisons ===
Sex segregation is very prevalent in the administration of prisons. Radical feminist Catharine MacKinnon says that the policy is in place for ease of management and not for protecting women, exemplified by the fact that women's prisons put women who have been convicted of rape or murder in the same wards as women who have been convicted of prostitution, or killing their batterers.

=== In home architecture ===
Many Saudi traditional homes have one entrance for men and another for women. For non-related males to enter the female sections of a Saudi home is a violation of family honour. The Arab word for the secluded section of the house is harim which means at once 'forbidden' and 'sacred'. Private space is associated with women while the public space, such as the living room, is reserved for men. Traditional house designs also use high walls, compartmentalized inner rooms, and curtains to protect the family and particularly women from the public.

Moreover, sex segregation was expected in public. In restaurants, banks and other public places in Saudi Arabia, men and women are required to enter and exit through separate doors. However, since 2019, Saudi Arabia no longer enforces sex segregation in restaurants and some other places.

=== In transport ===
On all Cairo Metro trains, the middle two cars (4th and 5th) and the foremost car in all Alexandrian trams are reserved for women (the 5th car in the Cairo Metro becomes mixed use after 21:00). These cars are used as an option for women who do not wish to ride with men in the same car; however, women can still ride other cars freely. This policy was introduced for protection of women from sexual harassment by men.

== Sex segregation in culture ==
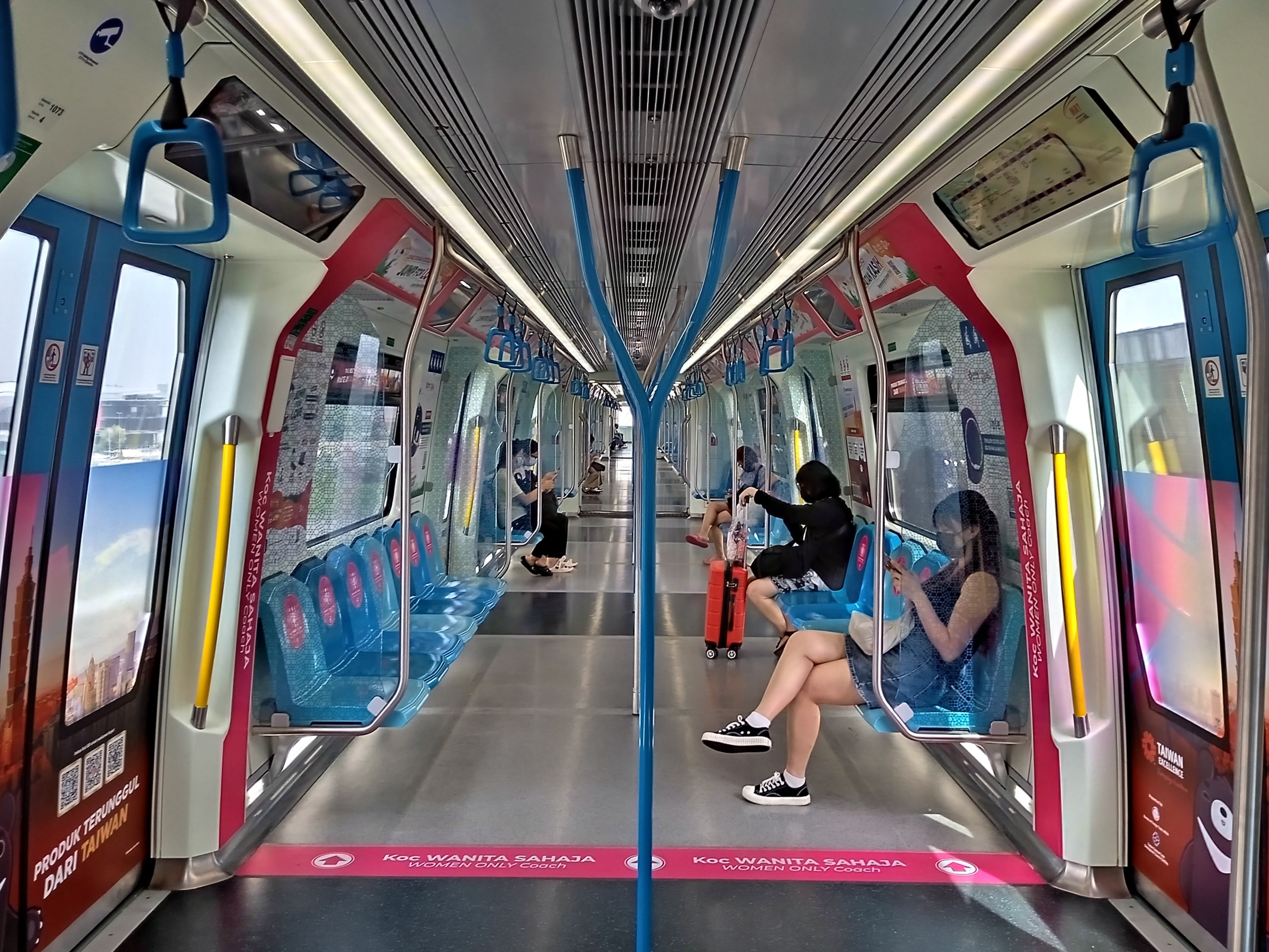
Women-only passenger car, Malaysia

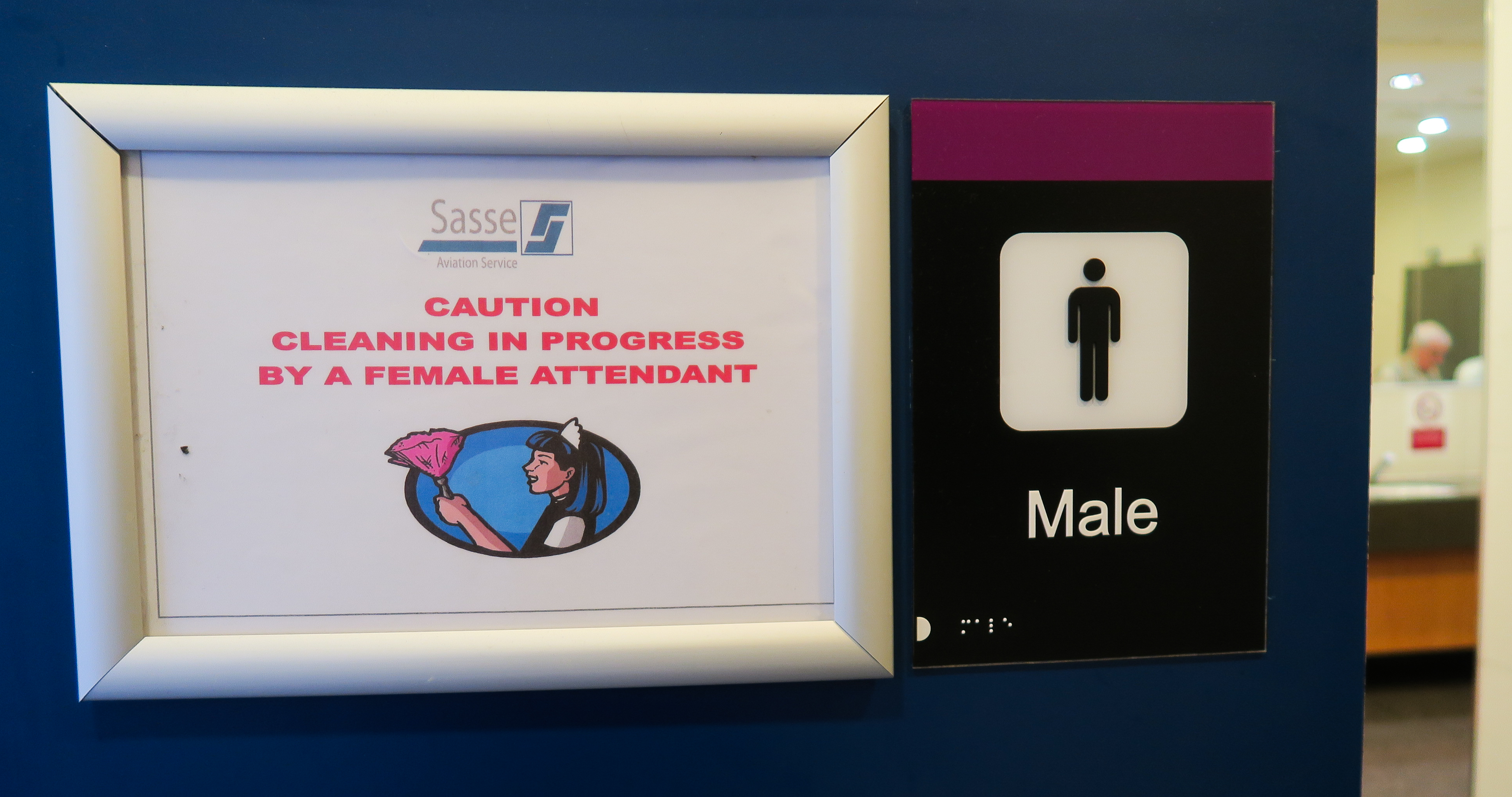
A note at the male public toilet in Edinburgh Airport about the fact that female cleaners might work there

For most children, sex segregation manifests itself early in the socialization process via group socialization theory, where children are expected to behave in certain sex-typed manners and form sex in and out-groups. In pre-school classrooms, for example, making gender more salient to children has been shown to lead to stronger gender stereotypes and inter-group biases between sex groups. These evident tendencies were also manifested in decreased playtime with children of the opposite sex, or a kind of early, selective sex segregation based on preconceived social norms. While specifically segregating by sex for playtime has not been linked to any long-lasting effects on women's rights compared to men, these different manners of socialization often lead to communication and power struggles between men and women and to differential life decisions by each sex based on these long-established gendered identities.

In elementary and secondary education, sex segregation sometimes yields and perpetuates gender bias in the form of treatment by teachers and peers that perpetuates traditional gender roles and sex bias, underrepresentation of girls in upper level math, science, and computer classes, fewer opportunities for girls to learn and solve problems, girls receiving less attention compared to the boys in their classes, and significantly different performance levels between boys and girls in reading and math classes. Sometimes in elementary schools teachers force the students to sit boy, girl, boy girl. Sex segregation in educational settings can also lead to negative outcomes for boys such as boys in co-educational classrooms having academic scores higher than boys in single-sex classrooms. On the contrary, girls in single-sex classrooms have academic scores higher than girls in co-educational classrooms. Boys academically benefit from a coeducational environment while girls do from a single-sex environment, so critics and proponents of both types of education argue that either single-sex or coeducational classrooms create a comparative disadvantage for either sex. Athletic participation and physical education are examples where appeals to differences in biological sex may encourage segregation within education systems. These differences can impact access to competition, gender identity construction, and external as well as internalized perceptions of capabilities, especially among young girls.

Separation of public toilets by sex is very common around the world. In certain settings the sex separation can be critical to ensure the safety of females, in particular schoolgirls, from male abuse. At the same time, sex segregated public toilets may promote a gender binary that excludes transgender people. Unisex public toilets can be a suitable alternative and/or addition to sex-segregated toilets in many cases.

A special case presents with choirs and choruses, especially in the tradition of the choir school which uses ensemble and musical discipline to ground academic discipline. Male and female voices are distinctive both solo and in ensemble, and segregated singing has an evolved and established aesthetic. Male voices, unlike female voices, break in early adolescence, and accommodating this break in an educational program is challenging in a coed environment. Coeducation tends to stigmatize males, as is often the case in expressive arts, unlike athletics.

During the Taiping Rebellion (1851–64) against the Qing dynasty, areas controlled by the Taiping Heavenly Kingdom had strict sex separation enforced. Even married couples were not allowed to live together until 1858. Okinoshima is a Japanese island where women are not allowed. Athos is a Greek peninsula where women are not allowed.

The preference of same-sex friendships (homosociality) compared to cross-sex friendships differs by country and is associated with sex segregation.

=== Sex segregation in fiction ===
Some literary works of social science fiction and gender, sex and sexuality in speculative fiction that consider sex segregation are the books Swastika Night and The Handmaid's Tale (later converted into a TV series).

== Sex segregation around the world ==
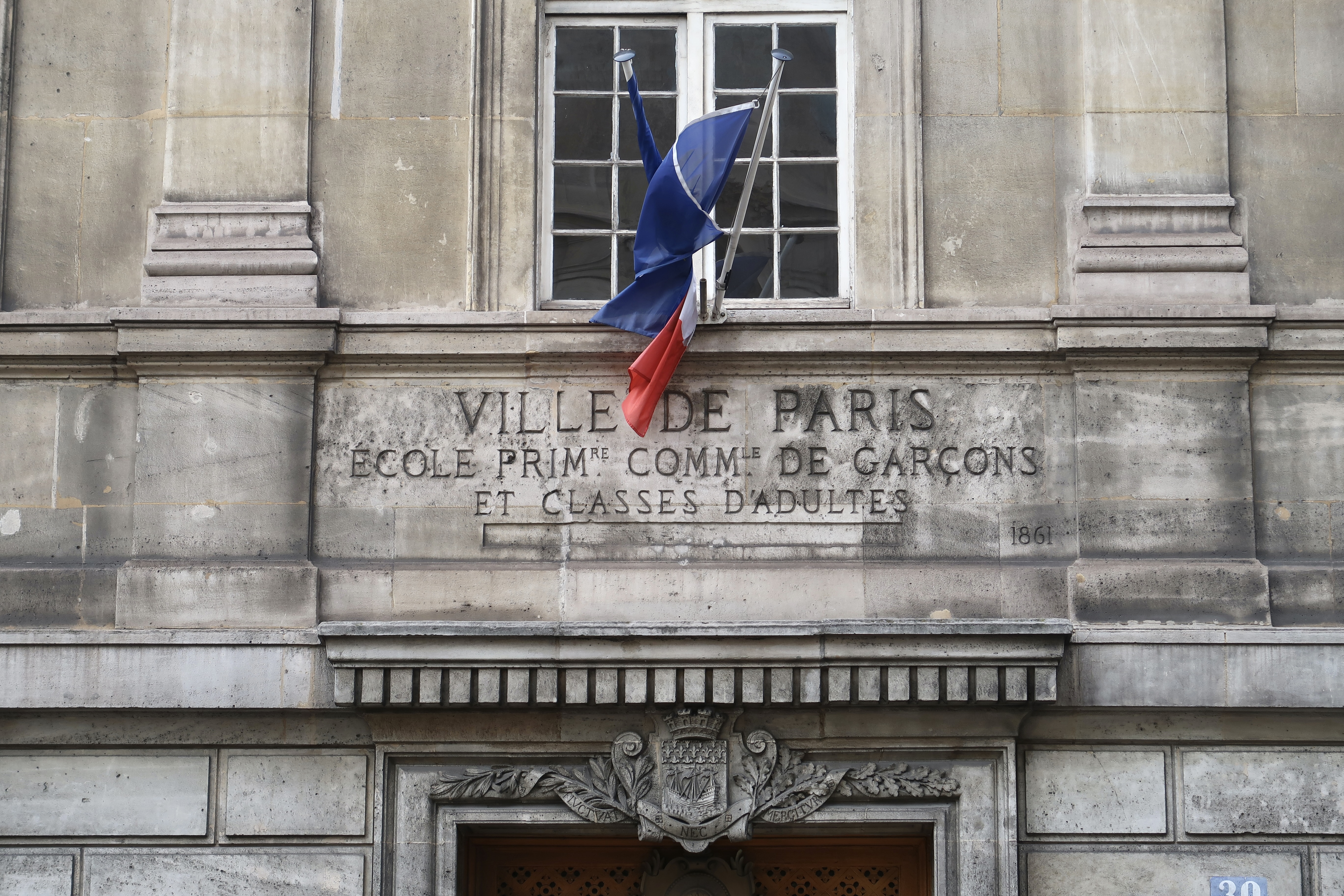
A single sex school in France

The Saudi sex segregation originated from an extreme concern for female purity and family honour. Social events used to be largely predicated on the separation of men and women; the mixing of non-related (non-mahram) men and women at parties and other social gatherings were extremely rare and limited to some of the modern Western-educated families. Sex segregation in Saudi Arabia is not inherent to the country's culture, but was promoted in the 1980s and 1990s by the government, the Sahwa movement, and conservative and religious behavioral enforcers (i.e. police, government officers, etc.).

In Saudi Arabia, universities are male-only or female-only. Saudi Arabia is home to the largest female-only university in the world, Princess Nourah Bint Abdul Rahman University, but Effat University was the most well-known until 2022.

During the rule of the first Islamic Emirate of Afghanistan (1996–2001), the Taliban issued edicts which forbade Afghan women from being educated, such edicts forced girls and women to leave schools and colleges. Many men had no contact with women outside of their family until they attended university. This caused men to not view women as their friends and treat them impolitely. Thousands of women suffered from insults daily in streets all over Afghanistan. During this period, gender segregation in Afghanistan's schools forced the strained Ministry of Education, which was already short on supplies, funding, and teachers, to recreate the system for each gender.

Sex segregation is a challenge in Israel and there is a struggle between a secular majority and an ultra-Orthodox minority over lifestyle in the country. The holy places in Israel are segregated by sex. For example men and women are separated from each other at Western Wall.

== Desegregation ==
Desegregation policies often seek to prevent sex discrimination, or alleviate occupational segregation. These policies encourage women and men to participate in environments typically predominated by the opposite sex. Examples include government quotas, gender-specific scholarships, co-ed recreational leagues, or programming designed to change social norms.

In China, deputies to the National People's Congress and members of the Chinese People's Political Consultative Conference National Committee proposed that the public should be more attentive to widespread instances of occupational segregation in China. Often employers reject specifically women applicants or create sex requirements in order to apply. The Labour Contract Law of the People's Republic of China and Law of the People's Republic of China on the Protection of Rights and Interests of Women state that no employer can refuse to employ women based on sex or raise application standards for women specifically, but also do not currently have clear sanctions for those who do segregate based on sex. China has also begun to encourage women in rural villages to take up positions of management in their committees. Specifically, China's Village Committee Organization Law mandates that women should make up one third or more of the members of village committees. The Dunhuang Women's Federation of Dunhuang City, in China's Gansu Province, provided training for their village's women in order to build political knowledge.

In March 2013 in the European Union, a resolution was passed to invest in training and professional development for women, promote women-run businesses, and include women on company boards. In Israel, the Minister of Religious Services, Yaakov Margi Shas, has recently supported removal of signs at cemeteries segregating women and men for eulogies and funerals, prohibiting women from taking part in the services. The Minister agreed with academic and politician, Yesh Atid MK Aliza Lavie, who questioned him about segregation policies enacted by rabbis and burial officials, that governmental opposition to sex segregation was necessary to combat these practices not supported by Jewish or Israeli law.

In other cases, sex segregation in one arena can be pursued to enable sex desegregation in another. For example, separation of boys and girls for early math and science education may be part of an effort to increase the representation of women in engineering or women in science.

Sometimes, countries will also argue that segregation in other nations violates human rights. For example, the United Nations and Western countries have encouraged kings of Saudi Arabia to end its strict segregation of institutions such as schools, government institutions, hospitals, and other public spaces in order to secure women's rights in Saudi Arabia Even though the removal of certain religious and government heads has made way for liberal agendas to promote desegregation, the public largely still subscribes to the idea of a segregated society, while institutions and the government itself still technically remain under the control of Wahhabism. Reform is small in size, since there is no constitution to back up policy changes concerning sex segregation. The Saudi people refer to this segregation as Khilwa and violation of the separation is punishable by law. This separation is tangibly manifested in the recently erected wall in places that employ both men and women, a feat possible by a law passed in 2011 allowing Saudi women to work in lingerie shops in order to lower female unemployment rates. The public views the 1.6 meter wall favorably, saying that it will lead to less instances of harassment by men visiting the expatriate women in the shops. The Luthan hotel in Saudi Arabia was the country's first women's only hotel, acting more as a vacation spot for women than a mandated segregated institution. Upon entering the hotel, women are allowed to remove their headscarves and abayas and the hotel employs only women, calling their bellhops the world's first bellgirls, providing opportunities for Saudi women in IT and engineering jobs where, outside the Luthan, are quite scarce.

== See also ==
- Age segregation
- Discrimination against non-binary people
- Discrimination against transgender men
- Discrimination against transgender women
- Gender-blind
- Gender inequality
- Gender polarization
- Geographical segregation
- Mixed-sex sports
- Occupational inequality
- Racial segregation
- Religious segregation
- School segregation
- Sexism
- Transgender discrimination
- Transgender inequality
- Transmisogyny
- Transphobia
- Unisex changing rooms
- Unisex public toilet
- Women and children first
