= Nyansapo Festival =

The Nyansapo Festival was a French fête to honor and create space for Black, brown, mixed, and diasporic women. Organized by the Afro-feminist group the Mwasi Collectif, the festival's purpose was to educate, celebrate, and empower Black feminism.

The festival ran in Paris, France, for four years: 2017, 2019, 2022, 2024 and 2026. The 2017 edition, held at La Général, Political and Social Artistic Laboratory, was the first festival organized by the Mwasi Collectif. It was the first Black feminist festival in France. Black and brown people of all genders and nationalities gathered in Paris for these historic festivals.

Afro-feminism in France stems from a violent and extensive history of French colonialism. Founded in 2014, the Mwasi Afro feminist Collectif is a French political organization that fights for Black liberation. The Mwasi Collectif released their manifesto, Afrofem, in 2018, articulating radical change. Specifically, they focused on diasporic women of all genders and backgrounds with African and Caribbean descent. The Mwasi Collectif has a variety of goals, demands, and propositions but is ultimately rooted in Black feminism as a political practice that requires the dissolution of hegemonic systems like anti-blackness, capitalism, and heteronormativity.

== Etymology ==
The term Nyansapo is derived from a West African group of people named the Akan. Presently, the Akan people live in Ghana and the Gyaman of the Ivory Coast. Nyansapo is a symbol, or Adinkra, for a wisdom knot. This term and symbol represent intelligence, creativity, and patience.

The term Mwasi has two meanings in two different native African languages: Lingala and Swahili. Lingala is a West African language existing in former French colonies. In Lingala, a Bantu language of the Congo, Mwasi means daughter, wife, or female. T One of the national languages is French. The term Mwasi means rebel or ‘to rebel’ in Swahili, which is the national language for many countries across the African continent.

Both words, Nyansapo and Mwasi, originate from countries that have been privy to or experienced French colonialism and imperialism.

== Festival Programs ==
The Nyansapo Festival editions in 2017, 2019, 2022 and 2026. All festival editions included various events educating and discussing Black experiences and empowerment. The programs included discourses about Black queerness, capitalism, histories, futures, and more.

- Opening Round Tables
- Guest Speakers
- Showcases
- Discussion Forums
- Educational Workshops
- Virtual Training and Workshops
- Book Clubs and Discussions
- Training
- Protests
- Dance Classes
- Performances
  - Puppet Shows
  - Dance Performances
  - Concerts
  - DJ sets
- Theatrical Readings
- Author Book Readings and Signings
- Brunch
- Children Shows
- Yoga
- Panels

== Controversies ==
The 2017 edition of the Nyansapo Festival, held on July 28-20th, caused sociopolitical uproar locally and globally. The Parisian Government accused both the Mwasi Collectif and the Nyansapo festival of being discriminatory. Eighty percent of the festival restricted White people and men from attendance but was open to Black women of all nationalities. Although the festival was public, many private events, workshops, and festival programs only allowed Black women to attend. These restrictions were to promote safe spaces for Black women to discuss intersectional topics, free from oppression.

The Mayor of Paris, Anne Hidalgo, attempted to ban the festival because the festival was thought to be held on public property. In a collection of tweets, Mayor Hidalgo condemned the festival and threatened legal action to terminate the festival. This sparked social discourse across platforms, including Twitter, news outlets, Afro-feminist blogs, and academic articles.

Other social justice groups and conservative groups, like SOS Racisme, the International League of Racism and Anti-Semitism (LIRCA), and the National Front, shared the same public critiques of the Nyansapo Festival. Negative media circulated about the festival and the Mwasi Collectif with the goal of condemnation.

Mayor Hidalgo claimed that she "found a solution" with the Mwasi Collectif, but they never met at any point in the organisation of the festival.

Mayor Hidalgo announced that public spaces were open to all people, regardless of race, and Black spaces and program events that restricted non-Black women were held on private property. However, the Mwasi Collectif publicly claimed that they were victims of discrimination, misinformation, and the fake news cycle. The founders announced that nothing had been changed from the original organization. According to the Mwasi Collectif, the festival had always planned for Black-only spaces to be organized on private property, and all public areas were open to everyone.

The Mwasi Collectif posted a response on their website titled “NYANSAPO Festival: To Have the Nerve to be a Political and Autonomous Afro-Descendant Organization” (2017). The article details the accusations and negative media that the festival and organization received. The article critiques the French government for its perpetuation of systemic racism and sexism.

The Nyansapo Festival of 2017 was ultimately successful despite the political and social controversies. The 2019 and 2022 editions of the festival were also successful received no major, negative media attention.

== Academic Implications ==
French, American, and other Western scholars examine global race relations to explore and create discourse about intersectional identities. While the controversies of the Nyansapo Festival in 2017 were isolated, it has become a point of evidence in both global studies and African/a studies. Scholars use the events of the festival to discuss racist, exclusionary, and discriminatory actions and beliefs. Specifically, the 2017 Nyansapo festival has been used as evidence to evaluate some of the following academic areas of research:

- Global Activism
- Afro Feminisms
- Violence and Oppression Against Black Women
- Anti-racism
- Parisian Politics on Race
- French Policies on Race
- Black Activism and Justice

== Future Events ==
The Mwasi Collectif is still an active social justice organization. Although they have been less active on technological platforms but are still organizing and educating communities about and for Afro-feminism. The organization decided to step back from its public-facing networks and limit responses about current events. There is no evidence to suggest this decision stemmed from their experience before and during the 2017 edition of the Nyansapo Festival. Mwasi Collectif is training, organizing, and mobilizing for future education and activism for Black liberation in France and abroad.

Currently, there is no information suggesting that there won't be a sixth Nyansapo Festival.

== See also ==
- Racism in France
- Discrimination in Europe
- Afrofeminism
