= Ladies' ordinary =

Historical women's-only dining space

A ladies' ordinary was a women-only dining space which started to appear in North American hotels and restaurants in the early 19th century. At the time, women were not permitted to dine alone or unaccompanied by a male escort in restaurants and the public rooms of luxury, mainly urban hotels. A ladies' ordinary provided a socially acceptable venue where respectable women could dine alone or with other women. It also protected women from the unwanted gazes and advances of men, a common fear in the male-dominated environment of the restaurant.

The first hotel to have housed a ladies' ordinary is thought to be Tremont House, Boston. On November 2, 1833, a restaurant for women referred to as a ladies' ordinary opened in New York City, by the proprietors of a neighbouring establishment called the Clinton Lunch. Isabella Lucy Bird, while travelling in the United States in the mid-19th century, wrote that the American House, a hotel in Boston, had an upstairs room separate from the main dining room called 'The Ladies' Ordinary', "where families, ladies and their invited guests take their meals".
